= 14th Maharashtra Assembly =

Legislature of Maharashtra, India (2019–2024)

←	13th Maharashtra Assembly	15th Maharashtra Assembly	→
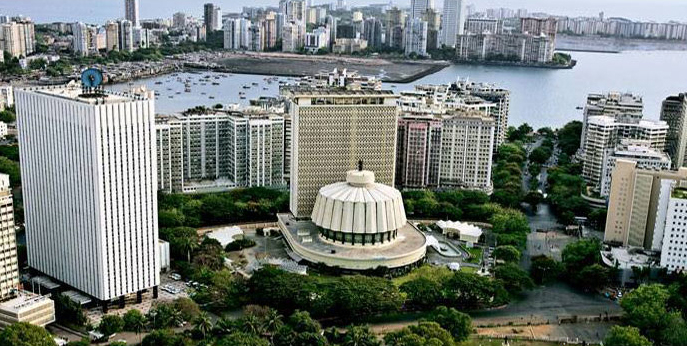
- Maharashtra Vidhan Sabha Mumbai

Overview
- Legislative body: Maharashtra Legislative Assembly
- Term: 27 November 2019 – 26 November 2024
- Election: 2019 Maharashtra Legislative Assembly election
- Government: Second Fadnavis ministry (2019 - 2019); Thackeray ministry (2019–2022); Eknath Shinde ministry(2022–2024)

Sovereign
- Governor: Bhagat Singh Koshyari (2019-2023); Ramesh Bais (2023-2024); C.P. Radhakrishnan (2024-2024)

House of the People
- Members: 288
- Speaker of the House: Nana Patole (2019-2021); Narhari Sitaram Zirwal (Acting) (2021-2022); Rahul Narwekar(2022-2024)
- Chief Minister: Devendra Fadnavis (2019-2019); Uddhav Thackeray (2019-2022); Eknath Shinde(2022-2024)
- Deputy Chief Minister: Ajit Pawar (2019-2019); Ajit Pawar (2019-2022); Devendra Fadnavis(2022-2024); Ajit Pawar (2023-2024)
- Leader of the House: Devendra Fadnavis (2019-2019); Uddhav Thackeray (2019-2022); Eknath Shinde (2022-2024)
- Leader of the Opposition: Dilip Walse-Patil (Acting) (2019-2019); Devendra Fadnavis (2019-2022); Ajit Pawar (2022-2023); Jitendra Awhad (Acting) (2023 - 2023); Balasaheb Thorat (Additional Charge) (2023 -2023); Vijay Namdevrao Wadettiwar (2023-2024)
- Party control: BJP+NCP (2019-2019); Maha Vikas Aghadi (2019-2022); National Democratic Alliance (2022-2024)

The Members of 14th Legislative Assembly of Maharashtra were elected in the 2019 Maharashtra Legislative Assembly election, with results announced on 24 October 2019.

The majority needed to form the government is 145 seats in the assembly of 288 MLAs. The incumbent BJP Shiv Sena alliance crossed the majority of 145 seats needed in the assembly by winning a total of 161 seats in the alliance. Individually BJP won 105 and SHS won 56 seats. The Opposition INC-NCP Alliance with 106 seats did not reach the majority mark. Individually INC won 44 and NCP won 54 seats. Due to differences in power sharing arrangement, 2019 Maharashtra political crisis ensued and Shiv Sena refused to support the newly sworned BJP CM. BJP did not prove majority in assembly. Shivsena and BJP split from their alliance.

Shiv Sena formed post-poll alliance with the Congress-NCP thus gaining majority of 172. The new alliance was named Maha Vikas Aghadi. Shiv Sena President Uddhav Thackeray was sworn is as the 19th Chief Minister of Maharashtra. BJP became the principal opposition party in Maharashtra.

On 21 June 2022, Eknath Shinde, a senior Shiv Sena leader, along with several other MLAs of the Maha Vikas Aghadi moved to Surat, Gujarat throwing the coalition into a crisis. Following the crisis, a BJP led National Democratic Alliance came into power.

== Office bearers ==
Post	Name	Party	Term
Governor	C. P. Radhakrishnan	BJP	
Speaker	Rahul Narwekar	BJP	
Deputy Speaker	Narhari Zirwal	NCP	
Chief minister	Eknath Shinde	SS	
First Deputy Chief Minister	Devendra Fadnavis	BJP	
Second Deputy Chief Minister	Ajit Pawar	NCP	
Leader of the House	Eknath Shinde	SS	
First Deputy Leader of the House	Devendra Fadnavis	BJP	
Second Deputy Leader of the House	Ajit Pawar	NCP	
Leader of Opposition	Vijay Wadettiwar	INC	
First Deputy Leaders of Opposition	Jitendra Awhad	NCP-SP	
Second Deputy Leaders of the Opposition	Ajay Choudhari	SS(UBT)	

== Members of Legislative Assembly ==
List-

District	No.	Constituency	Name	Party	Alliance	Remarks
Nandurbar	1	Akkalkuwa (ST)	Adv. K. C. Padavi	Indian National Congress	MVA	
Nandurbar	2	Shahada (ST)	Rajesh Padvi	Bharatiya Janata Party	NDA	
Nandurbar	3	Nandurbar (ST)	Vijaykumar Krishnarao Gavit	Bharatiya Janata Party	NDA	Cabinet Minister
Nandurbar	4	Navapur (ST)	Shirishkumar Surupsing Naik	Indian National Congress	MVA	
Dhule	5	Sakri (ST)	Manjula Gavit	Independent	NDA	
Dhule	6	Dhule Rural	Kunal Rohidas Patil	Indian National Congress	MVA	
Dhule	7	Dhule City	Shah Faruk Anwar	All India Majlis-E-Ittehadul Muslimeen	No Alliance	
Dhule	8	Sindkheda	Jayakumar Jitendrasinh Rawal	Bharatiya Janata Party	NDA	
Dhule	9	Shirpur (ST)	Kashiram Vechan Pawara	Bharatiya Janata Party	NDA	
Jalgaon	10	Chopda (ST)	Latabai Sonawane	Shiv Sena	NDA	
Jalgaon	11	Raver	Shirish Madhukarrao Chaudhari	Indian National Congress	MVA	
Jalgaon	12	Bhusawal (SC)	Sanjay Waman Sawakare	Bharatiya Janata Party	NDA	
Jalgaon	13	Jalgaon City	Suresh Damu Bhole (Rajumama)	Bharatiya Janata Party	NDA	
Jalgaon	14	Jalgaon Rural	Gulabrao Patil	Shiv Sena	NDA	Cabinet Minister
Jalgaon	15	Amalner	Anil Bhaidas Patil	Nationalist Congress Party	NDA	Cabinet Minister; Chief Whip of Legislative Assembly NCP
Jalgaon	16	Erandol	Chimanrao Patil	Shiv Sena	NDA	
Jalgaon	17	Chalisgaon	Mangesh Chavan	Bharatiya Janata Party	NDA	
Jalgaon	18	Pachora	Kishor Appa Patil	Shiv Sena	NDA	
Jalgaon	19	Jamner	Girish Mahajan	Bharatiya Janata Party	NDA	Cabinet Minister
Jalgaon	20	Muktainagar	Chandrakant Nimba Patil	Independent	NDA	
Buldana	21	Malkapur	Rajesh Panditrao Ekade	Indian National Congress	MVA	
Buldana	22	Buldhana	Sanjay Gaikwad	Shiv Sena	NDA	
Buldana	23	Chikhali	Shweta Mahale	Bharatiya Janata Party	NDA	
Buldana	24	Sindkhed Raja	Rajendra Shingne	Nationalist Congress Party	NDA	
Buldana	25	Mehkar (SC)	Sanjay Bhashkar Raimulkar	Shiv Sena	NDA	
Buldana	26	Khamgaon	Akash Pandurang Fundkar	Bharatiya Janata Party	NDA	
Buldana	27	Jalgaon (Jamod)	Sanjay Shriram Kute	Bharatiya Janata Party	NDA	
Akola	28	Akot	Prakash Gunvantrao Bharsakale	Bharatiya Janata Party	NDA	
Akola	29	Balapur	Nitin Deshmukh	Shiv Sena (Uddhav Balasaheb Thackeray)	MVA	
Akola	30	Akola West	Vacant			Death of Govardhan Mangilal Sharma
Akola	31	Akola East	Randhir Pralhadrao Sawarkar	Bharatiya Janata Party	NDA	
Akola	32	Murtizapur (SC)	Harish Marotiappa Pimple	Bharatiya Janata Party	NDA	
Washim	33	Risod	Amit Subhashrao Zanak	Indian National Congress	MVA	
Washim	34	Washim (SC)	Lakhan Sahadeo Malik	Bharatiya Janata Party	NDA	
Washim	35	Karanja	Vacant			Death of Rajendra Patni
Amravati	36	Dhamangaon Railway	Pratap Adsad	Bharatiya Janata Party	NDA	
Amravati	37	Badnera	Ravi Rana	Independent	NDA	
Amravati	38	Amravati	Sulbha Sanjay Khodke	Indian National Congress	MVA	
Amravati	39	Teosa	Yashomati Chandrakant Thakur	Indian National Congress	MVA	
Amravati	40	Daryapur (SC)	Vacant			Resignation of Balwant Baswant Wankhade
Amravati	41	Melghat (ST)	Rajkumar Dayaram Patel	Prahar Janshakti Party	NDA	
Amravati	42	Achalpur	Bachchu Kadu	Prahar Janshakti Party	NDA	Group Leader Legislative Assembly PJP Party
Amravati	43	Morshi	Devendra Mahadevrao Bhuyar	Independent	NDA	
Wardha	44	Arvi	Dadarao Keche	Bharatiya Janata Party	NDA	
Wardha	45	Deoli	Ranjit Prataprao Kamble	Indian National Congress	MVA	
Wardha	46	Hinganghat	Samir Trimbakrao Kunawar	Bharatiya Janata Party	NDA	
Wardha	47	Wardha	Pankaj Rajesh Bhoyar	Bharatiya Janata Party	NDA	
Nagpur	48	Katol	Anil Deshmukh	Nationalist Congress Party (Sharadchandra Pawar)	MVA	
Nagpur	49	Savner	Vacant			Disqualification of Sunil Chhatrapal Kedar
Nagpur	50	Hingna	Sameer Meghe	Bharatiya Janata Party	NDA	
Nagpur	51	Umred (SC)	Vacant			Resignation of Raju Parwe
Nagpur	52	Nagpur South West	Devendra Fadnavis	Bharatiya Janata Party	NDA	Deputy Chief Minister; Deputy Leader of the House; Leader Legislature BJP Party; Group Leader Legislative Assembly BJP Party
Nagpur	53	Nagpur South	Mohan Mate	Bharatiya Janata Party	NDA	
Nagpur	54	Nagpur East	Krishna Khopde	Bharatiya Janata Party	NDA	
Nagpur	55	Nagpur Central	Vikas Kumbhare	Bharatiya Janata Party	NDA	
Nagpur	56	Nagpur West	Vikas Pandurang Thakre	Indian National Congress	MVA	
Nagpur	57	Nagpur North (SC)	Nitin Raut	Indian National Congress	MVA	
Nagpur	58	Kamthi	Tekchand Sawarkar	Bharatiya Janata Party	NDA	
Nagpur	59	Ramtek	Ashish Jaiswal	Independent	NDA	
Bhandara	60	Tumsar	Raju Manikrao Karemore	Nationalist Congress Party	NDA	
Bhandara	61	Bhandara (SC)	Narendra Bhondekar	Independent	NDA	
Bhandara	62	Sakoli	Nana Patole	Indian National Congress	MVA	
Gondia	63	Arjuni Morgaon (SC)	Manohar Chandrikapure	Nationalist Congress Party	NDA	
Gondia	64	Tirora	Vijay Bharatlal Rahangdale	Bharatiya Janata Party	NDA	
Gondia	65	Gondiya	Vinod Agrawal	Independent	NDA	
Gondia	66	Amgaon (ST)	Korote Sahasram Maroti	Indian National Congress	MVA	
Gadchiroli	67	Armori (ST)	Krushna Gajbe	Bharatiya Janata Party	NDA	
Gadchiroli	68	Gadchiroli (ST)	Dr.Deorao Madguji Holi	Bharatiya Janata Party	NDA	
Gadchiroli	69	Aheri (ST)	Dharamraobaba Bhagwantrao Aatram	Nationalist Congress Party	NDA	Cabinet Minister
Chandrapur	70	Rajura	Subhash Dhote	Indian National Congress	MVA	
Chandrapur	71	Chandrapur (SC)	Kishor Jorgewar	Independent	NDA	
Chandrapur	72	Ballarpur	Sudhir Mungantiwar	Bharatiya Janata Party	NDA	Cabinet Minister
Chandrapur	73	Bramhapuri	Vijay Namdevrao Wadettiwar	Indian National Congress	MVA	Leader of the Opposition
Chandrapur	74	Chimur	Bunty Bhangdiya	Bharatiya Janata Party	NDA	
Chandrapur	75	Warora	Vacant			Resignation of Pratibha Dhanorkar
Yavatmal	76	Wani	Sanjivreddi Bapurao Bodkurwar	Bharatiya Janata Party	NDA	
Yavatmal	77	Ralegaon (ST)	Ashok Uike	Bharatiya Janata Party	NDA	
Yavatmal	78	Yavatmal	Madan Madhukarrao Yerawar	Bharatiya Janata Party	NDA	
Yavatmal	79	Digras	Sanjay Rathod	Shiv Sena	NDA	Cabinet Minister
Yavatmal	80	Arni (ST)	Sandeep Dhurve	Bharatiya Janata Party	NDA	
Yavatmal	81	Pusad	Indranil Naik	Nationalist Congress Party	NDA	
Yavatmal	82	Umarkhed (SC)	Namdev Sasane	Bharatiya Janata Party	NDA	
Nanded	83	Kinwat	Bhimrao Keram	Bharatiya Janata Party	NDA	
Nanded	84	Hadgaon	Jawalgaonkar Madhavrao Nivruttirao Patil	Indian National Congress	MVA	
Nanded	85	Bhokar	Vacant			Resignation of Ashok Chavan
Nanded	86	Nanded North	Balaji Kalyankar	Shiv Sena	NDA	
Nanded	87	Nanded South	Mohanrao Marotrao Hambarde	Indian National Congress	MVA	
Nanded	88	Loha	Shyamsundar Dagdoji Shinde	Peasants And Workers Party of India	MVA	Group Leader Legislative Assembly PWPI Party
Nanded	89	Naigaon	Rajesh Pawar	Bharatiya Janata Party	NDA	
Nanded	90	Deglur (SC)	Jitesh Antapurkar	Indian National Congress	MVA	Won in 2021 bypoll necessitated after the death of Raosaheb Antapurkar
Nanded	91	Mukhed	Tushar Rathod	Bharatiya Janata Party	NDA	
Hingoli	92	Basmath	Chandrakant Nawghare	Nationalist Congress Party	NDA	
Hingoli	93	Kalamnuri	Santosh Bangar	Shiv Sena	NDA	
Hingoli	94	Hingoli	Tanaji Sakharamji Mutkule	Bharatiya Janata Party	NDA	
Parbhani	95	Jintur	Meghna Sakore Bordikar	Bharatiya Janata Party	NDA	
Parbhani	96	Parbhani	Rahul Vedprakash Patil	Shiv Sena (Uddhav Balasaheb Thackeray)	MVA	
Parbhani	97	Gangakhed	Ratnakar Gutte	Rashtriya Samaj Paksha	NDA	Group Leader Legislative Assembly RSP Party
Parbhani	98	Pathri	Suresh Warpudkar	Indian National Congress	MVA	
Jalna	99	Partur	Babanrao Lonikar	Bharatiya Janata Party	NDA	
Jalna	100	Ghansawangi	Rajesh Tope	Nationalist Congress Party (Sharadchandra Pawar)	MVA	
Jalna	101	Jalna	Kailas Gorantyal	Indian National Congress	MVA	
Jalna	102	Badnapur (SC)	Narayan Tilakchand Kuche	Bharatiya Janata Party	NDA	
Jalna	103	Bhokardan	Santosh Danve	Bharatiya Janata Party	NDA	
Chhatrapati Sambhaji Nagar	104	Sillod	Abdul Sattar Abdul Nabi	Shiv Sena	NDA	Cabinet Minister
Chhatrapati Sambhaji Nagar	105	Kannad	Udaysingh Rajput	Shiv Sena (Uddhav Balasaheb Thackeray)	MVA	
Chhatrapati Sambhaji Nagar	106	Phulambri	Vacant			Resignation of Haribhau Bagde
Chhatrapati Sambhaji Nagar	107	Aurangabad Central	Pradeep Jaiswal	Shiv Sena	NDA	
Chhatrapati Sambhaji Nagar	108	Aurangabad West (SC)	Sanjay Shirsat	Shiv Sena	NDA	
Chhatrapati Sambhaji Nagar	109	Aurangabad East	Atul Moreshwar Save	Bharatiya Janata Party	NDA	Cabinet Minister
Chhatrapati Sambhaji Nagar	110	Paithan	Vacant			Resignation of Sandipanrao Bhumre
Chhatrapati Sambhaji Nagar	111	Gangapur	Prashant Bamb	Bharatiya Janata Party	NDA	
Chhatrapati Sambhaji Nagar	112	Vaijapur	Ramesh Bornare	Shiv Sena	NDA	
Nashik	113	Nandgaon	Suhas Kande	Shiv Sena	NDA	
Nashik	114	Malegaon Central	Mohammed Ismail Abdul Khalique	All India Majlis-E-Ittehadul Muslimeen	No Alliance	Group Leader Legislative Assembly AIMIM Party
Nashik	115	Malegaon Outer	Dadaji Bhuse	Shiv Sena	NDA	Cabinet Minister
Nashik	116	Baglan (ST)	Dilip Manglu Borse	Bharatiya Janata Party	NDA	
Nashik	117	Kalwan (ST)	Nitin Arjun Pawar	Nationalist Congress Party	NDA	
Nashik	118	Chandwad	Adv. Rahul Daulatrao Aher	Bharatiya Janata Party	NDA	
Nashik	119	Yevla	Chaggan Bhujbal	Nationalist Congress Party	NDA	Cabinet Minister
Nashik	120	Sinnar	Manikrao Kokate	Nationalist Congress Party	NDA	
Nashik	121	Niphad	Diliprao Shankarrao Bankar	Nationalist Congress Party	NDA	
Nashik	122	Dindori (ST)	Narhari Sitaram Zirwal	Nationalist Congress Party	NDA	Deputy Speaker of the House
Nashik	123	Nashik East	Rahul Uttamrao Dhikale	Bharatiya Janata Party	NDA	
Nashik	124	Nashik Central	Devayani Farande	Bharatiya Janata Party	NDA	
Nashik	125	Nashik West	Seema Mahesh Hiray	Bharatiya Janata Party	NDA	
Nashik	126	Deolali (SC)	Saroj Ahire	Nationalist Congress Party	NDA	
Nashik	127	Igatpuri (ST)	Hiraman Khoskar	Indian National Congress	MVA	
Palghar	128	Dahanu (ST)	Vinod Bhiva Nikole	Communist Party of India (Marxist)	Unallied	Group Leader Legislative Assembly CPI(M) Party
Palghar	129	Vikramgad (ST)	Sunil Chandrakant Bhuasara	Nationalist Congress Party (Sharadchandra Pawar)	MVA	
Palghar	130	Palghar (ST)	Shrinivas Vanga	Shiv Sena	NDA	
Palghar	131	Boisar (ST)	Rajesh Raghunath Patil	Bahujan Vikas Aghadi	None	
Palghar	132	Nalasopara	Kshitij Thakur	Bahujan Vikas Aghadi	None	
Palghar	133	Vasai	Hitendra Thakur	Bahujan Vikas Aghadi	None	Group Leader Legislative Assembly BVA Party
Thane	134	Bhiwandi Rural (ST)	Shantaram Tukaram More	Shiv Sena	NDA	
Thane	135	Shahapur (ST)	Daulat Bhika Daroda	Nationalist Congress Party	NDA	
Thane	136	Bhiwandi West	Mahesh Prabhakar Choughule	Bharatiya Janata Party	NDA	
Thane	137	Bhiwandi East	Rais Shaikh	Samajwadi Party	MVA	
Thane	138	Kalyan West	Vishwanath Bhoir	Shiv Sena	NDA	
Thane	139	Murbad	Kisan Kathore	Bharatiya Janata Party	NDA	
Thane	140	Ambernath (SC)	Balaji Kinikar	Shiv Sena	NDA	
Thane	141	Ulhasnagar	Kumar Ailani	Bharatiya Janata Party	NDA	
Thane	142	Kalyan East	Ganpat Gaikwad	Bharatiya Janata Party	NDA	
Thane	143	Dombivli	Ravindra Chavan	Bharatiya Janata Party	NDA	Cabinet Minister
Thane	144	Kalyan Rural	Pramod Ratan Patil	Maharashtra Navnirman Sena	NDA	Group Leader Legislative Assembly MNS Party
Thane	145	Mira Bhayandar	Geeta Bharat Jain	Independent	NDA	
Thane	146	Ovala-Majiwada	Pratap Sarnaik	Shiv Sena	NDA	
Thane	147	Kopri-Pachpakhadi	Eknath Shinde	Shiv Sena	NDA	Chief Minister; Leader of the House; Leader Legislature SHS Party; Group Leader Legislative Assembly SHS Party
Thane	148	Thane	Sanjay Mukund Kelkar	Bharatiya Janata Party	NDA	
Thane	149	Mumbra-Kalwa	Jitendra Awhad	Nationalist Congress Party (Sharadchandra Pawar)	MVA	Deputy Leader of The Opposition (First); Chief Whip of Legislative Assembly NCP
Thane	150	Airoli	Ganesh Naik	Bharatiya Janata Party	NDA	
Thane	151	Belapur	Manda Vijay Mhatre	Bharatiya Janata Party	NDA	
Mumbai Suburban	152	Borivali	Sunil Rane	Bharatiya Janata Party	NDA	
Mumbai Suburban	153	Dahisar	Manisha Chaudhary	Bharatiya Janata Party	NDA	
Mumbai Suburban	154	Magathane	Prakash Surve	Shiv Sena	NDA	
Mumbai Suburban	155	Mulund	Mihir Kotecha	Bharatiya Janata Party	NDA	
Mumbai Suburban	156	Vikhroli	Sunil Raut	Shiv Sena (Uddhav Balasaheb Thackeray)	MVA	
Mumbai Suburban	157	Bhandup West	Ramesh Korgaonkar	Shiv Sena (Uddhav Balasaheb Thackeray)	MVA	
Mumbai Suburban	158	Jogeshwari East	Vacant			Resignation of Ravindra Waikar
Mumbai Suburban	159	Dindoshi	Sunil Prabhu	Shiv Sena (Uddhav Balasaheb Thackeray)	MVA	Chief Whip of Legislative Assembly SHS(UBT)
Mumbai Suburban	160	Kandivali East	Atul Bhatkhalkar	Bharatiya Janata Party	NDA	
Mumbai Suburban	161	Charkop	Yogesh Sagar	Bharatiya Janata Party	NDA	
Mumbai Suburban	162	Malad West	Aslam Shaikh	Indian National Congress	MVA	
Mumbai Suburban	163	Goregaon	Vidya Thakur	Bharatiya Janata Party	NDA	
Mumbai Suburban	164	Versova	Bharati Hemant Lavekar	Bharatiya Janata Party	NDA	
Mumbai Suburban	165	Andheri West	Ameet Bhaskar Satam	Bharatiya Janata Party	NDA	
Mumbai Suburban	166	Andheri East	Rutuja Ramesh Latke	Shiv Sena (Uddhav Balasaheb Thackeray)	MVA	Won in 2022 bypoll necessitated after the death of Ramesh Latke
Mumbai Suburban	167	Vile Parle	Parag Alavani	Bharatiya Janata Party	NDA	
Mumbai Suburban	168	Chandivali	Dilip Lande	Shiv Sena	NDA	
Mumbai Suburban	169	Ghatkopar West	Ram Kadam	Bharatiya Janata Party	NDA	
Mumbai Suburban	170	Ghatkopar East	Parag Shah	Bharatiya Janata Party	NDA	
Mumbai Suburban	171	Mankhurd Shivaji Nagar	Abu Asim Azmi	Samajwadi Party	MVA	Group Leader Legislative Assembly SP Party
Mumbai Suburban	172	Anushakti Nagar	Nawab Malik	Nationalist Congress Party (Sharadchandra Pawar)	MVA	
Mumbai Suburban	173	Chembur	Prakash Phaterpekar	Shiv Sena (Uddhav Balasaheb Thackeray)	MVA	
Mumbai Suburban	174	Kurla(SC)	Mangesh Kudalkar	Shiv Sena	NDA	
Mumbai Suburban	175	Kalina	Sanjay Potnis	Shiv Sena (Uddhav Balasaheb Thackeray)	MVA	
Mumbai Suburban	176	Vandre East	Zeeshan Siddique	Nationalist Congress Party	NDA	
Mumbai Suburban	177	Vandre West	Ashish Shelar	Bharatiya Janata Party	NDA	Chief Whip of Legislative Assembly BJP
Mumbai City	178	Dharavi (SC)	Vacant			Resignation of Varsha Gaikwad
Mumbai City	179	Sion Koliwada	Captain R. Tamil Selvan	Bharatiya Janata Party	NDA	
Mumbai City	180	Wadala	Kalidas Kolambkar	Bharatiya Janata Party	NDA	
Mumbai City	181	Mahim	Sada Sarvankar	Shiv Sena	NDA	
Mumbai City	182	Worli	Aditya Thackeray	Shiv Sena (Uddhav Balasaheb Thackeray)	MVA	
Mumbai City	183	Shivadi	Ajay Choudhari	Shiv Sena (Uddhav Balasaheb Thackeray)	MVA	Deputy Leader of The Opposition (Second); Leader Legislature SHS(UBT) Party; Group Leader Legislative Assembly SHS(UBT) Party
Mumbai City	184	Byculla	Yamini Jadhav	Shiv Sena	NDA	
Mumbai City	185	Malabar Hill	Mangal Prabhat Lodha	Bharatiya Janata Party	NDA	Cabinet Minister
Mumbai City	186	Mumbadevi	Amin Patel	Indian National Congress	MVA	
Mumbai City	187	Colaba	Rahul Narwekar	Bharatiya Janata Party	NDA	Speaker of the House
Raigad	188	Panvel	Prashant Thakur	Bharatiya Janata Party	NDA	
Raigad	189	Karjat	Mahendra Sadashiv Thorve	Shiv Sena	NDA	
Raigad	190	Uran	Mahesh Baldi	Independent	NDA	
Raigad	191	Pen	Ravisheth Patil	Bharatiya Janata Party	NDA	
Raigad	192	Alibag	Mahendra Dalvi	Shiv Sena	NDA	
Raigad	193	Shrivardhan	Aditi Sunil Tatkare	Nationalist Congress Party	NDA	Cabinet Minister
Raigad	194	Mahad	Bharat Gogawale	Shiv Sena	NDA	Chief Whip of Legislative Assembly SHS
Pune	195	Junnar	Atul Vallabh Benke	Nationalist Congress Party	NDA	
Pune	196	Ambegaon	Dilip Walse-Patil	Nationalist Congress Party	NDA	Cabinet Minister
Pune	197	Khed Alandi	Dilip Mohite	Nationalist Congress Party	NDA	
Pune	198	Shirur	Ashok Raosaheb Pawar	Nationalist Congress Party	NDA	
Pune	199	Daund	Rahul Kul	Bharatiya Janata Party	NDA	
Pune	200	Indapur	Dattatray Vithoba Bharne	Nationalist Congress Party	NDA	
Pune	201	Baramati	Ajit Pawar	Nationalist Congress Party	NDA	Deputy CM of Maharastra
Pune	202	Purandar	Sanjay Jagtap	Indian National Congress	MVA	
Pune	203	Bhor	Sangram Anantrao Thopate	Indian National Congress	MVA	
Pune	204	Maval	Sunil Shelke	Nationalist Congress Party	NDA	
Pune	205	Chinchwad	Ashwini Jagtap	Bharatiya Janata Party	NDA	Won in 2023 by poll necessitated after the death of Laxman Jagtap
Pune	206	Pimpri (SC)	Anna Bansode	Nationalist Congress Party	NDA	
Pune	207	Bhosari	Mahesh Landge	Bharatiya Janata Party	NDA	
Pune	208	Vadgaon Sheri	Sunil Tingre	Nationalist Congress Party	NDA	
Pune	209	Shivajinagar	Siddharth Shirole	Bharatiya Janata Party	NDA	
Pune	210	Kothrud	Chandrakant Bacchu Patil	Bharatiya Janata Party	NDA	Cabinet Minister
Pune	211	Khadakwasala	Bhimrao Tapkir	Bharatiya Janata Party	NDA	
Pune	212	Parvati	Madhuri Misal	Bharatiya Janata Party	NDA	
Pune	213	Hadapsar	Chetan Tupe	Nationalist Congress Party	NDA	
Pune	214	Pune Cantonment	Sunil Kamble	Bharatiya Janata Party	NDA	
Pune	215	Kasba Peth	Ravindra Dhangekar	Indian National Congress	MVA	Won in 2023 by poll necessitated after the death of Mukta Tilak
Ahmednagar	216	Akole (ST)	Kiran Lahamate	Nationalist Congress Party	NDA	
Ahmednagar	217	Sangamner	Balasaheb Thorat	Indian National Congress	MVA	Leader Legislature Congress Party; Group Leader Legislative Assembly Congress Party
Ahmednagar	218	Shirdi	Radhakrishna Vikhe Patil	Bharatiya Janata Party	NDA	Cabinet Minister
Ahmednagar	219	Kopargaon	Ashutosh Ashokrao Kale	Nationalist Congress Party	NDA	
Ahmednagar	220	Shrirampur (SC)	Lahu Kanade	Indian National Congress	MVA	
Ahmednagar	221	Nevasa	Shankarrao Gadakh	Shiv Sena (Uddhav Balasaheb Thackeray)	MVA	Switched from KSP to SHS
Ahmednagar	222	Shevgaon	Monika Rajale	Bharatiya Janata Party	NDA	
Ahmednagar	223	Rahuri	Prajakt Tanpure	Nationalist Congress Party (Sharadchandra Pawar)	MVA	
Ahmednagar	224	Parner	Vacant			Resignation of Nilesh Lanke
Ahmednagar	225	Ahmednagar City	Sangram Jagtap	Nationalist Congress Party	NDA	
Ahmednagar	226	Shrigonda	Babanrao Pachpute	Bharatiya Janata Party	NDA	
Ahmednagar	227	Karjat Jamkhed	Rohit Pawar	Nationalist Congress Party (Sharadchandra Pawar)	MVA	
Beed	228	Georai(SC)	Laxman Pawar	Bharatiya Janata Party	NDA	
Beed	229	Majalgaon	Prakashdada Solanke	Nationalist Congress Party	NDA	
Beed	230	Beed	Sandeep Kshirsagar	Nationalist Congress Party (Sharadchandra Pawar)	MVA	
Beed	231	Ashti	Balasaheb Ajabe	Nationalist Congress Party	NDA	
Beed	232	Kaij (SC)	Namita Mundada	Bharatiya Janata Party	NDA	
Beed	233	Parli	Dhananjay Munde	Nationalist Congress Party	NDA	Cabinet Minister
Latur	234	Latur Rural	Dhiraj Deshmukh	Indian National Congress	MVA	
Latur	235	Latur City	Amit Deshmukh	Indian National Congress	MVA	
Latur	236	Ahmadpur	Babasaheb Patil	Nationalist Congress Party (Sharadchandra Pawar)	MVA	
Latur	237	Udgir (SC)	Sanjay Bansode	Nationalist Congress Party	NDA	Cabinet Minister
Latur	238	Nilanga	Sambhaji Patil Nilangekar	Bharatiya Janata Party	NDA	
Latur	239	Ausa	Abhimanyu Dattatray Pawar	Bharatiya Janata Party	NDA	
Dharashiv	240	Umarga (SC)	Dnyanraj Chougule	Shiv Sena	NDA	
Dharashiv	241	Tuljapur	Ranajagjitsinha Patil	Bharatiya Janata Party	NDA	
Dharashiv	242	Dharashiv	Kailas Ghadge Patil	Shiv Sena (Uddhav Balasaheb Thackeray)	MVA	
Dharashiv	243	Paranda	Tanaji Sawant	Shiv Sena	NDA	Cabinet Minister
Solapur	244	Karmala	Sanjay Shinde	Independent	NDA	
Solapur	245	Madha	Babanrao Shinde	Nationalist Congress Party	NDA	
Solapur	246	Barshi	Rajendra Raut	Independent	NDA	
Solapur	247	Mohol (SC)	Yashwant Mane	Nationalist Congress Party	NDA	
Solapur	248	Solapur City North	Vijay Deshmukh	Bharatiya Janata Party	NDA	
Solapur	249	Solapur City Central	Vacant			Resignation of Praniti Shinde
Solapur	250	Akkalkot	Sachin Kalyanshetti	Bharatiya Janata Party	NDA	
Solapur	251	Solapur South	Subhash Sureshchandra Deshmukh	Bharatiya Janata Party	NDA	
Solapur	252	Pandharpur	Samadhan Autade	Bharatiya Janata Party	NDA	Won in 2021 by poll necessitated after the death of Bharat Bhalke
Solapur	253	Sangola	Adv. Shahajibapu Rajaram Patil	Shiv Sena	NDA	
Solapur	254	Malshiras (SC)	Ram Satpute	Bharatiya Janata Party	NDA	
Satara	255	Phaltan (SC)	Dipak Pralhad Chavan	Nationalist Congress Party	NDA	
Satara	256	Wai	Makrand Jadhav - Patil	Nationalist Congress Party	NDA	
Satara	257	Koregaon	Mahesh Sambhajiraje Shinde	Shiv Sena	NDA	
Satara	258	Man	Jaykumar Gore	Bharatiya Janata Party	NDA	
Satara	259	Karad North	Shamrao Pandurang Patil	Nationalist Congress Party	NDA	
Satara	260	Karad South	Prithviraj Chavan	Indian National Congress	MVA	
Satara	261	Patan	Shambhuraj Desai	Shiv Sena	NDA	Cabinet Minister
Satara	262	Satara	Shivendra Raje Bhosale	Bharatiya Janata Party	NDA	
Ratnagiri	263	Dapoli	Yogesh Kadam	Shiv Sena	NDA	
Ratnagiri	264	Guhagar	Bhaskar Jadhav	Shiv Sena (Uddhav Balasaheb Thackeray)	MVA	
Ratnagiri	265	Chiplun	Shekhar Govindrao Nikam	Nationalist Congress Party	NDA	
Ratnagiri	266	Ratnagiri	Uday Samant	Shiv Sena	NDA	Cabinet Minister
Ratnagiri	267	Rajapur	Rajan Salvi	Shiv Sena (Uddhav Balasaheb Thackeray)	MVA	
Sindhudurg	268	Kankavli	Nitesh Narayan Rane	Bharatiya Janata Party	NDA	
Sindhudurg	269	Kudal	Vaibhav Naik	Shiv Sena (Uddhav Balasaheb Thackeray)	MVA	
Sindhudurg	270	Sawantwadi	Deepak Vasant Kesarkar	Shiv Sena	NDA	Cabinet Minister
Kolhapur	271	Chandgad	Rajesh Narasingrao Patil	Nationalist Congress Party	NDA	
Kolhapur	272	Radhanagari	Prakashrao Abitkar	Shiv Sena	NDA	
Kolhapur	273	Kagal	Hasan Mushrif	Nationalist Congress Party	NDA	Cabinet Minister
Kolhapur	274	Kolhapur South	Ruturaj Sanjay Patil	Indian National Congress	MVA	
Kolhapur	275	Karvir	Vacant			Death of PN Patil
Kolhapur	276	Kolhapur North	Jayshri Jadhav	Indian National Congress	MVA	Won in 2022 by-poll necessitated after the death of Chandrakant Jadhav
Kolhapur	277	Shahuwadi	Vinay Kore	Jan Surajya Shakti	NDA	Group Leader Legislative Assembly JSS Party
Kolhapur	278	Hatkanangle (SC)	Raju Awale	Indian National Congress	MVA	
Kolhapur	279	Ichalkaranji	Prakashanna Awade	Bharatiya Janata Party	NDA	
Kolhapur	280	Shirol	Rajendra Patil	Independent	NDA	
Sangli	281	Miraj (SC)	Suresh Khade	Bharatiya Janata Party	NDA	Cabinet Minister
Sangli	282	Sangli	Sudhir Gadgil	Bharatiya Janata Party	NDA	
Sangli	283	Islampur	Jayant Patil	Nationalist Congress Party (Sharadchandra Pawar)	MVA	Leader Legislature NCP(SP) Party; Group Leader Legislative Assembly NCP(SP) Party
Sangli	284	Shirala	Mansing Fattesingrao Naik	Nationalist Congress Party (Sharadchandra Pawar)	MVA	
Sangli	285	Palus-Kadegaon	Vishwajeet Kadam	Indian National Congress	MVA	
Sangli	286	Khanapur	Vacant			Death of Anil Babar
Sangli	287	Tasgaon-Kavathe Mahankal	Suman Patil	Nationalist Congress Party (Sharadchandra Pawar)	MVA	
Sangli	288	Jat	Vikramsinh Balasaheb Sawant	Indian National Congress	MVA	
