= 12th Maharashtra Assembly =

←	11th Maharashtra Assembly	13th Maharashtra Assembly	→
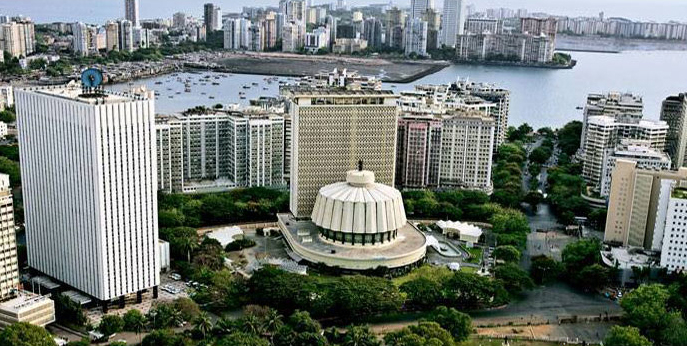
- Maharashtra Vidhan Sabha Mumbai

Overview
- Legislative body: Maharashtra Legislature
- Term: 8 November 2009 – 28 September 2014
- Election: 2009 Maharashtra Legislative Assembly election
- Government: Second Ashok Chavan ministry; Prithviraj Chavan ministry

Sovereign
- Governor: S. C. Jamir; K. Sankaranarayanan; Om Prakash Kohli (additional charge); C. Vidyasagar Rao

House of the People
- Members: 288
- Speaker of the House: Dilip Walse-Patil
- Deputy Speaker of the House: Madhukarrao Chavan
- Chief Minister: Ashok Chavan; Prithviraj Chavan
- Deputy Chief Minister: Chhagan Bhujbal; Ajit Anantrao Pawar
- Leader of the House: Ashok Chavan; Prithviraj Chavan
- Leader of the Opposition: Eknath Khadse
- Party control: Maha Aghadi

The Members of 12th Legislative Assembly of Maharashtra were elected during the 2009 Maharashtra Legislative Assembly election, with results announced on 22 October 2009.

The ruling INC-NCP(Democratic Front) won the elections gaining 82 and 62 Seats respectively and winning 175 seats in alliance with support of independents and smaller parties. The opposition Shiv Sena-Bharatiya Janata Party lost the election gaining 45 and 46 seats respectively and winning 91 seats in alliance. Incumbent CM Ashok Chavan was again sworn in as the Chief minister of Maharashtra with Ajit Pawar of NCP as his Deputy.

Due to scam allegations on Ashok Chavan, The Congress replaced him with senior Congress leader Prithviraj Chavan as the Chief minister of Maharashtra.

== Members ==
- Speaker:

Dilip Walse-Patil, NCP

- Deputy Speaker:
- Madhukarrao Chavan, INC

(10 December 2009- 18 November 2010)

- Vasant Chinduji Purke, INC

(4 December 2010 - 8 November 2014)

- Chief minister:
- Ashok Chavan, INC

(7 November 2009 - 9 November 2010)

- Prithviraj Chavan, INC

(11 November 2010 - 26 September 2014)

- Deputy Chief Minister:
- Chhagan Bhujbal, NCP

(7 November 2009 - 9 November 2010)

Ajit Pawar, NCP

(11 November 2010 - 26 September 2014)

- Leaders of The House:
- Ashok Chavan, INC

(7 November 2009 - 9 November 2010)

- Prithviraj Chavan, INC

(11 November 2010 - 26 September 2014)

- Leader of Opposition:

Eknath Khadse, BJP

=== Party-wise seats ===
Parties and Coalitions	Seats	Leader
Indian National Congress 82 / 288 (28%)	82	Ashok Chavan (7 Nov 2009 – 9 November 2010) Prithviraj Chavan
Nationalist Congress Party 62 / 288 (22%)	62	Ajit Pawar
Bharatiya Janata Party 46 / 288 (16%)	46	Eknath Khadse
Shiv Sena 45 / 288 (16%)	45	Subhash Desai
Maharashtra Navnirman Sena 13 / 288 (5%)	13	Pravin Darekar
Peasants and Workers Party of India 4 / 288 (1%)	4	Vivek Patil
Samajwadi Party 4 / 288 (1%)	4	Abu Azmi
Jan Surajya Shakti 2 / 288 (0.7%)	2	Vinay Kore
Bahujan Vikas Aaghadi 2 / 288 (0.7%)	2	Babasaheb Patil
Bharipa Bahujan Mahasangh 1 / 288 (0.3%)	1	Haridas Bhade
Communist Party of India (Marxist) 1 / 288 (0.3%)	1	Rajaram Ozare
Rashtriya Samaj Paksha 1 / 288 (0.3%)	1	Balasaheb Patil
Swabhimani Paksha 1 / 288 (0.3%)	1	Bharat Bhalke
Lok Sangram 1 / 288 (0.3%)	1	Anil Anna Gote
Independents 24 / 288 (8%)	24	

== Members of Legislative Assembly ==
Results
#	Constituency Name	Elected MLA	Party
Nandurbar District
1	Akkalkuwa	K. C. Padavi	Indian National Congress
2	Shahada	Padmakar Vijaysing Valvi	Indian National Congress
3	Nandurbar	Vijaykumar Krishnarao Gavit	Nationalist Congress Party
4	Navapur	Sharad Gavit	Samajwadi Party
Dhule District
5	Sakri	Yogendra Bhoye	Indian National Congress
6	Dhule Rural	Shard Patil	Shiv Sena
7	Dhule City	Anil Anna Gote	Loksangram
8	Sindkheda	Jayakumar Jitendrasinh Rawal	Bharatiya Janata Party
9	Shirpur	Kashiram Vechan Pawara	Indian National Congress
Jalgaon District
10	Chopda	Jagdishchandra Valvi	Nationalist Congress Party
11	Raver	Shirish Chaudhari	Independent
12	Bhusawal	Sanjay Waman Sawakare	Nationalist Congress Party
13	Jalgaon City	Suresh Jain	Shiv Sena
14	Jalgaon Rural	Gulabrao Baburao Deokar	Nationalist Congress Party
15	Amalner	Krushibhushan Sahebrao Patil	Independent
16	Erandol	Chimanrao Patil	Shiv Sena
17	Chalisgaon	Rajiv Anil Deshmukh	Nationalist Congress Party
18	Pachora	Dilip Wagh	Nationalist Congress Party
19	Jamner	Girish Mahajan	Bharatiya Janata Party
20	Muktainagar	Eknath Khadse	Bharatiya Janata Party
Buldhana District
21	Malkapur	Chainsukh Madanlal Sancheti	Bharatiya Janata Party
22	Buldhana	Vijayraj Shinde	Shiv Sena
23	Chikhli	Rahul Siddhvinayak Bondre	Indian National Congress
24	Sindkhed Raja	Rajendra Shingne	Nationalist Congress Party
25	Mehkar	Sanjay Raimulkar	Shiv Sena
26	Khamgaon	Dilipkumar Sananda	Indian National Congress
27	Jalgaon (Jamod)	Sanjay Shriram Kute	Bharatiya Janata Party
Akola District
28	Akot	Sanjay Gawande	Shiv Sena
29	Balapur	Baliram Sirskar	Independent
30	Akola West	Govardhan Mangilal Sharma	Bharatiya Janata Party
31	Akola East	Haridas Bhade	Bharipa Bahujan Mahasangh
32	Murtizapur	Harish Marotiappa Pimple	Bharatiya Janata Party
Washim District
33	Risod	Subhash Zanak	Indian National Congress
34	Washim	Lakhan Sahadeo Malik	Bharatiya Janata Party
35	Karanja	Prakash Dahake	Nationalist Congress Party
Amravati District
36	Dhamamgaon Railway	Virendra Jagtap	Indian National Congress
37	Badnera	Ravi Rana	Independent
38	Amravati	Raosaheb Shekhawat	Indian National Congress
39	Teosa	Yashomati Chandrakant Thakur	Indian National Congress
40	Daryapur	Abhijit Adsul	Shiv Sena
41	Melghat	Kewalram Kale	Indian National Congress
42	Achalpur	Omprakash Babarao Kadu	Independent
43	Morshi	Anil Bonde	Independent
Wardha District
44	Arvi	Dadarao Keche	Bharatiya Janata Party
45	Deoli	Ranjit Prataprao Kamble	Indian National Congress
46	Hinganghat	Ashok Shinde	Shiv Sena
47	Wardha	Suresh Deshmukh	Independent
Nagpur District
48	Katol	Anil Deshmukh	Nationalist Congress Party
49	Savner	Sunil Chhatrapal Kedar	Indian National Congress
50	Hingna	Vijaybabu Ghodmare	Bharatiya Janata Party
51	Umred	Sudhir Laxmanrao Parwe	Bharatiya Janata Party
52	Nagpur South West	Devendra Fadnavis	Bharatiya Janata Party
53	Nagpur South	Dinanath Padole	Indian National Congress
54	Nagpur East	Krishna Pancham Khopde	Bharatiya Janata Party
55	Nagpur Central	Vikas Shankarrao Kumbhare	Bharatiya Janata Party
56	Nagpur West	Sudhakar Shamrao Deshmukh	Bharatiya Janata Party
57	Nagpur North	Nitin Raut	Indian National Congress
58	Kamthi	Chandrashekhar Bawankule	Bharatiya Janata Party
59	Ramtek	Ashish Jaiswal	Shiv Sena
Bhandara District
60	Tumsar	Anil Bawankar	Indian National Congress
61	Bhandara	Narendra Bhondekar	Shiv Sena
62	Sakoli	Nana Patole	Bharatiya Janata Party
Gondiya District
63	Arjuni Morgaon	Rajkumar Badole	Bharatiya Janata Party
64	Tirora	Khushal Bopche	Bharatiya Janata Party
65	Gondiya	Gopaldas Shankarlal Agrawal	Indian National Congress
66	Amgaon	Ramrtanbapu Bhartrajbapu Raut	Indian National Congress
Gadchiroli District
67	Armori	Anandrao Gedam	Indian National Congress
68	Gadchiroli	Namdeo Usendi	Indian National Congress
69	Aheri	Dipak Atram	Independent
Chandrapur District
70	Rajura	Subhash Dhote	Indian National Congress
71	Chandrapur	Nanaji Sitaram Shamkule	Bharatiya Janata Party
72	Ballarpur	Sudhir Mungantiwar	Bharatiya Janata Party
73	Brahmapuri	Atul Devidas Deshkar	Bharatiya Janata Party
74	Chimur	Vijay Namdevrao Wadettiwar	Indian National Congress
75	Warora	Sanjay Deotale	Indian National Congress
Yavatmal District
76	Wani	Wamanrao Kasawar	Indian National Congress
77	Ralegaon	Vasant Chindhuji Purake	Indian National Congress
78	Yavatmal	Nilesh Deshmukh Parwekar	Indian National Congress
79	Digras	Sanjay Rathod	Shiv Sena
80	Arni	Shivajirao Moghe	Indian National Congress
81	Pusad	Manohar Naik	Nationalist Congress Party
82	Umarkhed	Vijayrao Yadavrao Khadse	Indian National Congress
Nanded District
83	Kinwat	Pradeep Jadhav	Nationalist Congress Party
84	Hadgaon	Madhavrao Patil	Indian National Congress
85	Bhokar	Ashok Chavan	Indian National Congress
86	Nanded North	D. P. Sawant	Indian National Congress
87	Nanded South	Omprakash Pokarna	Indian National Congress
88	Loha	Shankar Dhondge	Nationalist Congress Party
89	Naigaon	Vasantrao Balwantrao Chavan	Independent
90	Deglur	Raosaheb Antapurkar	Indian National Congress
91	Mukhed	Hanmanthrao Patil	Indian National Congress
Hingoli District
92	Basmath	Jayprakash Raosaheb Dandegaonkar	Nationalist Congress Party
93	Kalamnuri	Rajeev Satav	Indian National Congress
94	Hingoli	Bhaurao Patil	Indian National Congress
Parbhani District
95	Jintur	Ramprasad Wamanrao Kadam	Indian National Congress
96	Parbhani	Sanjay Jadhav	Shiv Sena
97	Gangakhed	Sitaram Ghandat	Independent
98	Pathri	Mira Renge	Shiv Sena
Jalna District
99	Partur	Sureshkumar Jethaliya	Independent
100	Ghansawangi	Rajesh Tope	Nationalist Congress Party
101	Jalna	Kailas Kisanrao Gorantyal	Indian National Congress
102	Badnapur	Santosh Sambre	Shiv Sena
103	Bhokardan	Chandrakant Pundlikrao Danve	Nationalist Congress Party
Aurangabad District
104	Sillod	Abdul Sattar	Indian National Congress
105	Kannad	Harshvardhan Jadhav	Maharashtra Navnirman Sena
106	Phulambri	Kalyan Vaijinathrao Kale	Indian National Congress
107	Aurangabad Central	Pradeep Jaiswal	Independent
108	Aurangabad West	Sanjay Shirsat	Shiv Sena
109	Aurangabad East	Rajendra Darda	Indian National Congress
110	Paithan	Sanjay Waghchaure	Nationalist Congress Party
111	Gangapur	Prashant Bamb	Independent
112	Vaijapur	RM Wani	Shiv Sena
Nashik District
113	Nandgaon	Pankaj Bhujbal	Nationalist Congress Party
114	Malegaon Central	Mohammed Ismail Abdul Khalique	Jan Surajya Shakti
115	Malegaon Outer	Dadaji Bhuse	Shiv Sena
116	Baglan	Umaji Borse	Bharatiya Janata Party
117	Kalwan	Arjun Pawar	Nationalist Congress Party
118	Chandvad	Shirishkumar Kotwal	Independent
119	Yewla	Chhagan Bhujbal	Nationalist Congress Party
120	Sinnar	Manikrao Kokate	Indian National Congress
121	Niphad	Anil Kadam	Shiv Sena
122	Dindori	Dhanraj Mahale	Shiv Sena
123	Nashik East	Uttamrao Dhikale	Maharashtra Navnirman Sena
124	Nashik Central	Vasantrao Gite	Maharashtra Navnirman Sena
125	Nashik West	Nitin Bhosale	Maharashtra Navnirman Sena
126	Devlali	Baban Gholap	Shiv Sena
127	Igatpuri	Nirmala Gavit	Indian National Congress
Palghar District
128	Dahanu	Rajaram Ozare	Communist Party of India (Marxist)
129	Vikramgad	Chintaman Vanaga	Bharatiya Janata Party
130	Palghar	Rajendra Gavit	Indian National Congress
131	Boisar	Vilas Tare	Bahujan Vikas Aaghadi
132	Nalasopara	Kshitij Thakur	Bahujan Vikas Aaghadi
133	Vasai	Vivek Raghunath Pandit	Independent
Thane District
134	Bhiwandi Rural	Vishnu Savara	Bharatiya Janata Party
135	Shahapur	Daulat Daroda	Shiv Sena
136	Bhiwandi West	Rashid Tahir Momin	Samajwadi Party
137	Bhiwandi East	Abu Azmi	Samajwadi Party
138	Kalyan West	Prakash Bhoir	Maharashtra Navnirman Sena
139	Murbad	Kisan Shankar Kathore	Nationalist Congress Party
140	Ambernath	Balaji Kinikar	Shiv Sena
141	Ulhasnagar	Kumar Ailani	Bharatiya Janata Party
142	Kalyan East	Ganpat Gaikwad	Independent
143	Dombivali	Ravindra Chavan	Bharatiya Janata Party
144	Kalyan Rural	Ramesh Ratan Patil	Maharashtra Navnirman Sena
145	Mira Bhayandar	Gilbert Mendonca	Nationalist Congress Party
146	Ovala-Majiwada	Pratap Sarnaik	Shiv Sena
147	Kopri-Pachpakhadi	Eknath Shinde	Shiv Sena
148	Thane	Rajan Vichare	Shiv Sena
149	Mumbra-Kalwa	Jitendra Awhad	Nationalist Congress Party
150	Airoli	Sandeep Naik	Nationalist Congress Party
151	Belapur	Ganesh Naik	Nationalist Congress Party
Mumbai Suburban
152	Borivali	Gopal Shetty	Bharatiya Janata Party
153	Dahisar	Vinod Ghosalkar	Shiv Sena
154	Magathane	Pravin Darekar	Maharashtra Navnirman Sena
155	Mulund	Sardar Tara Singh	Bharatiya Janata Party
156	Vikhroli	Mangesh Sangle	Maharashtra Navnirman Sena
157	Bhandup West	Shishir Shinde	Maharashtra Navnirman Sena
158	Jogeshwari East	Ravindra Waikar	Shiv Sena
159	Dindoshi	Rajhans Singh	Indian National Congress
160	Kandivali East	Thakur Ramesh Singh	Indian National Congress
161	Charkop	Yogesh Sagar	Bharatiya Janata Party
162	Malad West	Aslam Shaikh	Indian National Congress
163	Goregaon	Subhash Desai	Shiv Sena
164	Versova	Baldev Khosa	Indian National Congress
165	Andheri West	Ashok Jadhav	Indian National Congress
166	Andheri East	Suresh Shetty	Indian National Congress
167	Vile Parle	Krishna Hegde	Indian National Congress
168	Chandivali	Mohammed Arif (Naseem) Khan	Indian National Congress
169	Ghatkopar West	Ram Kadam	Maharashtra Navnirman Sena
170	Ghatkopar East	Prakash Mehta	Bharatiya Janata Party
171	Mankhurd Shivaji Nagar	Abu Azmi	Samajwadi Party
172	Anushakti Nagar	Nawab Malik	Nationalist Congress Party
173	Chembur	Chandrakant Handore	Indian National Congress
174	Kurla	Milind Anna Kamble	Nationalist Congress Party
175	Kalina	Kripashankar Singh	Indian National Congress
176	Vandre East	Bala Sawant	Shiv Sena
177	Vandre West	Baba Siddique	Indian National Congress
Mumbai City District
178	Dharavi	Varsha Gaikwad	Indian National Congress
179	Sion Koliwada	Jagannath Shetty	Indian National Congress
180	Wadala	Kalidas Kolambkar	Indian National Congress
181	Mahim	Nitin Sardesai	Maharashtra Navnirman Sena
182	Worli	Sachin Ahir	Nationalist Congress Party
183	Shivadi	Bala Nandgaonkar	Maharashtra Navnirman Sena
184	Byculla	Madhukar Chavan	Indian National Congress
185	Malabar Hill	Mangal Lodha	Bharatiya Janata Party
186	Mumbadevi	Amin Patel	Indian National Congress
187	Colaba	Annie Shekhar	Indian National Congress
Raigad District
188	Panvel	Prashant Thakur	Indian National Congress
189	Karjat	Suresh Narayan Lad	Nationalist Congress Party
190	Uran	Vivek Patil	Peasants And Workers Party of India
191	Pen	Dhairyashil Patil	Peasants And Workers Party of India
192	Alibag	Meenakshi Patil	Peasants And Workers Party of India
193	Shrivardhan	Sunil Tatkare	Nationalist Congress Party
194	Mahad	Bharatshet Gogawale	Shiv Sena
Pune District
195	Junnar	Vallabh Benke	Nationalist Congress Party
196	Ambegaon	Dilip Walse-Patil	Nationalist Congress Party
197	Khed Alandi	Dilip Mohite	Nationalist Congress Party
198	Shirur	Ashok Raosaheb Pawar	Nationalist Congress Party
199	Daund	Ramesh Thorat	Independent
200	Indapur	Harshvardhan Patil	Indian National Congress
201	Baramati	Ajit Pawar	Nationalist Congress Party
202	Purandar	Vijay Shivtare	Shiv Sena
203	Bhor	Sangram Anantrao Thopate	Indian National Congress
204	Maval	Sanjay (Bala) Vishwanath Bhegade	Bharatiya Janata Party
205	Chinchwad	Laxman Pandurang Jagtap	Independent
206	Pimpri	Anna Bansode	Nationalist Congress Party
207	Bhosari	Vilas Lande	Independent
208	Vadgaon Sheri	Bapusaheb Pathare	Nationalist Congress Party
209	Shivajinagar	Vinayak Nimhan	Indian National Congress
210	Kothrud	Chandrakant Mokate	Shiv Sena
211	Khadakwasla	Ramesh Wanjale	Maharashtra Navnirman Sena
212	Parvati	Madhuri Misal	Bharatiya Janata Party
213	Hadapsar	Mahadeo Babar	Shiv Sena
214	Pune Cantonment	Ramesh Bagwe	Indian National Congress
215	Kasba Peth	Girish Bapat	Bharatiya Janata Party
Ahmednagar District
216	Akole	Vaibhav Madhukar Pichad	Nationalist Congress Party
217	Sangamner	Balasaheb Thorat	Indian National Congress
218	Shirdi	Radhakrishna Vikhe Patil	Indian National Congress
219	Kopargaon	Ashok Kale	Shiv Sena
220	Shrirampur	Bhausaheb Malhari Kamble	Indian National Congress
221	Nevasa	Shankarrao Gadakh	Nationalist Congress Party
222	Shevgaon	Chandrashekhar Ghule	Nationalist Congress Party
223	Rahuri	Shivaji Bhanudas Kardile	Bharatiya Janata Party
224	Parner	Vijayrao Bhaskarrao Auti	Shiv Sena
225	Ahmednagar City	Anil Rathod	Shiv Sena
226	Shrigonda	Babanrao Pachpute	Nationalist Congress Party
227	Karjat Jamkhed	Ram Shinde	Bharatiya Janata Party
Beed District
228	Georai	Badamrao Pandit	Nationalist Congress Party
229	Majalgaon	Prakashdada Solanke	Nationalist Congress Party
230	Beed	Jaidatta Kshirsagar	Nationalist Congress Party
231	Ashti	Suresh Dhas	Nationalist Congress Party
232	Kaij	Vimal Mundada	Nationalist Congress Party
233	Parli	Pankaja Munde	Bharatiya Janata Party
Latur District
234	Latur Rural	Vaijanath Shinde	Indian National Congress
235	Latur City	Amit Deshmukh	Indian National Congress
236	Ahmadpur	Babasaheb Patil	Rashtriya Samaj Paksha
237	Udgir	Sudhakar Bhalerao	Bharatiya Janata Party
238	Nilanga	Shivajirao Patil Nilangekar	Indian National Congress
239	Ausa	Basavraj Patil	Indian National Congress
Osmanabad District
240	Umarga	Dnyanraj Chougule	Shiv Sena
241	Tuljapur	Madhukarrao Chavan	Indian National Congress
242	Osmanabad	Omprakash Rajenimbalkar	Shiv Sena
243	Paranda	Rahul Mote	Nationalist Congress Party
Solapur District
244	Karmala	Digambar Bagal	Nationalist Congress Party
245	Madha	Babanrao Shinde	Nationalist Congress Party
246	Barshi	Dilip Sopal	Independent
247	Mohol	Laxman Dhobale	Nationalist Congress Party
248	Solapur City North	Vijay Deshmukh	Bharatiya Janata Party
249	Solapur City Central	Praniti Shinde	Indian National Congress
250	Akkalkot	Sidramappa Patil	Bharatiya Janata Party
251	Solapur South	Dilip Mane	Indian National Congress
252	Pandharpur	Bharat Bhalke	Swabhimani Paksha
253	Sangola	Ganpatrao Deshmukh	Peasants And Workers Party of India
254	Malsiras	Hanumant Dolas	Nationalist Congress Party
Satara District
255	Phaltan	Dipak Pralhad Chavan	Nationalist Congress Party
256	Wai	Makarand Jadhav Patil	Independent
257	Koregaon	Shashikant Shinde	Nationalist Congress Party
258	Man	Jaykumar Gore	Independent
259	Karad North	Shamrao Pandurang Patil	Independent
260	Karad South	Vilasrao Patil	Indian National Congress
261	Patan	Satyajit Patankar	Nationalist Congress Party
262	Satara	Shivendra Raje Bhosale	Nationalist Congress Party
Ratnagiri District
263	Dapoli	Suryakant Dalvi	Shiv Sena
264	Guhagar	Bhaskar Jadhav	Nationalist Congress Party
265	Chiplun	Sadanand Chavan	Shiv Sena
266	Ratnagiri	Uday Samant	Nationalist Congress Party
267	Rajapur	Rajan Salvi	Shiv Sena
Sindhudurg District
268	Kankavli	Pramod Jathar	Bharatiya Janata Party
269	Kudal	Narayan Rane	Indian National Congress
270	Sawantwadi	Deepak Vasant Kesarkar	Nationalist Congress Party
Kolhapur District
271	Chandgad	Babasaheb Kupekar	Nationalist Congress Party
272	Radhanagari	K P Patil	Nationalist Congress Party
273	Kagal	Hasan Mushrif	Nationalist Congress Party
274	Kolhapur South	Satej Patil	Indian National Congress
275	Karvir	Chandradip Narke	Shiv Sena
276	Kolhapur North	Rajesh Vinayakrao Kshirsagar	Shiv Sena
277	Shahuwadi	Vinay Kore	Jan Surajya Shakti
278	Hatkanangale	Sujit Minchekar	Shiv Sena
279	Ichalkaranji	Suresh Ganpati Halvankar	Bharatiya Janata Party
280	Shirol	S.R. Patil	Indian National Congress
Sangli District
281	Miraj	Suresh Khade	Bharatiya Janata Party
282	Sangli	Sambhaji Pawar	Bharatiya Janata Party
283	Islampur	Jayant Patil	Nationalist Congress Party
284	Shirala	Mansing Naik	Independent
285	Palus-Kadegaon	Patangrao Kadam	Indian National Congress
286	Khanapur	Sadashivrao Patil	Indian National Congress
287	Tasgaon-Kavathe Mahankal	R. R. Patil	Nationalist Congress Party
288	Jat	Prakash Shendge	Bharatiya Janata Party
