= 13th Maharashtra Assembly =

Legislature of Maharashtra, 2014–2019

←	12th Maharashtra Assembly	14th Maharashtra Assembly	→
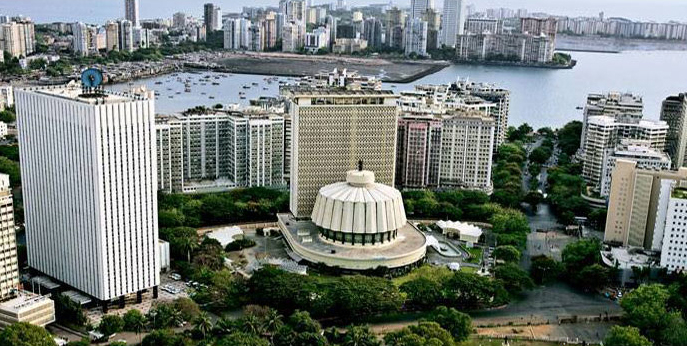
- Maharashtra Vidhan Sabha Mumbai

Overview
- Legislative body: Maharashtra Legislature
- Term: 9 November 2014 – 8 November 2019
- Election: 2014 Maharashtra Legislative Assembly election
- Government: First Fadnavis ministry

Sovereign
- Governor: C. Vidyasagar Rao; Bhagat Singh Koshyari

House of the People
- Members: 288
- Speaker of the House: Haribhau Bagade(BJP)
- Duputy Speaker of the House: Vijayrao Bhaskarrao Auti(Shiv Sena)
- Chief Minister: Devendra Fadnavis
- Leader of the House: Devendra Fadnavis
- Leader of the Opposition: Eknath Shinde(Shivsena); Radhakrishna Vikhe Patil(INC); Vijay Namdevrao Wadettiwar(INC)
- Party control: National Democratic Alliance

The Members of 13th Legislative Assembly of Maharashtra were elected during the 2014 Maharashtra Legislative Assembly election, with results announced on 19 October 2014.

The Bharatiya Janata Party was elected as the largest party in the election with 122 seats out of 288 seats, 76 more than their previous 46 seats. The Shiv Sena was elected as the second largest party in the election with 63 seats out of 288 seats, 18 more than their previous 45 seats. Devendra Fadnavis took oath as the Chief minister of Maharashtra with outside support from the Nationalist Congress Party in the beginning and then Shiv Sena direct support after 1 month.

== Members ==
Members	Name	Political Party	Alliance	Term start	Term end
Speaker	Haribhau Bagade	Bharatiya Janata Party	NDA	15 October 2014	21 October 2019
Deputy Speaker	Vijayrao Bhaskarrao Auti	Shiv Sena	NDA	5 December 2014	21 October 2019
Chief Minister	Devendra Fadnavis	Bharatiya Janata Party	NDA	15 October 2014	21 October 2019
Leader of House	Devendra Fadnavis	Bharatiya Janata Party	NDA	15 October 2014	21 October 2019
Leader of Opposition	Eknath Shinde	Shiv Sena	SS+	12 November 2014	5 December 2014
Leader of Opposition	Radhakrishna Vikhe Patil	Indian National Congress	UPA	23 December 2014	4 June 2019
Leader of Opposition	Vijay Namdevrao Wadettiwar	Indian National Congress	UPA	24 June 2019	9 November 2019

=== Party-wise Seats ===
Party	Seats	Leader
Bharatiya Janata Party 122 / 288 (42%)	122	Devendra Fadnavis
Shiv Sena 63 / 288 (22%)	63	Eknath Shinde
Indian National Congress 42 / 288 (15%)	42	Vijay Namdevrao Wadettiwar
Nationalist Congress Party 41 / 288 (14%)	41	Ajit Pawar
Peasants and Workers Party of India 3 / 288 (1%)	3	Ganpatrao Deshmukh
Bahujan Vikas Aaghadi 3 / 288 (1%)	3	Kshitij Thakur
All India Majlis-e-Ittehadul Muslimeen 2 / 288 (0.7%)	2	Waris Pathan
Maharashtra Navnirman Sena 1 / 288 (0.3%)	1	Sharaddada Bhimaji Sonavane
Bharipa Bahujan Mahasangh 1 / 288 (0.3%)	1	Baliram Sirskar
Rashtriya Samaj Paksha 1 / 288 (0.3%)	1	Rahul Kul
Communist Party of India (Marxist) 1 / 288 (0.3%)	1	Jiva Pandu Gavit
Samajwadi Party 1 / 288 (0.3%)	1	Abu Azmi
Independents 7 / 288 (2%)	7	
None of the above		

== Members of Legislative Assembly ==
MLA list
#	Assembly Constituency	Member	Party
	Nandurbar District		
1	Akkalkuwa	K. C. Padavi	INC
2	Shahada	Udesingh Kocharu Padvi	BJP
3	Nandurbar	Vijaykumar Krishnarao Gavit	BJP
4	Navapur	Surupsingh Hirya Naik	INC
Dhule District
5	Sakri	Dhanaji Sitaram Ahire	INC
6	Dhule Rural	Kunal Rohidas Patil	INC
7	Dhule City	Anil Anna Gote	BJP
8	Sindkheda	Jayakumar Jitendrasinh Rawal	BJP
9	Shirpur	Kashiram Vechan Pawara	INC
Jalgaon District
10	Chopda	Chandrakant Baliram Sonawane	SS
11	Raver	Haribhau Jawale	BJP
12	Bhusawal	Sanjay Waman Sawakare	BJP
13	Jalgaon City	Suresh Damu Bhole	BJP
14	Jalgaon Rural	Gulab Raghunath Patil	SS
15	Amalner	Shirish Hiralal Chaudhari	Ind
16	Erandol	Satish Bhaskarrao Patil	NCP
17	Chalisgaon	Unmesh Bhaiyyasaheb Patil	BJP
18	Pachora	Kishor Appa Patil	SS
19	Jamner	Girish Mahajan	BJP
20	Muktainagar	Eknath Khadse	BJP
21	Malkapur	Chainsukh Madanlal Sancheti	BJP
Buldhana District
22	Buldhana	Harshwardhan Vasantrao Sapkal	INC
23	Chikhli	Rahul Siddhvinayak Bondre	INC
24	Sindkhed Raja	Shashikant Narsingrao Khedekar	SS
25	Mehkar	Sanjay Bhashkar Raimulkar	SS
26	Khamgaon	Akash Pandurang Fundkar	BJP
27	Jalgaon (Jamod)	Sanjay Shriram Kute	BJP
Akola District
28	Akot	Prakash Gunvantrao Bharsakale	BJP
29	Balapur	Baliram Sirskar	BBM
30	Akola West	Govardhan Mangilal Sharma	BJP
31	Akola East	Randhir Pralhadrao Savarkar	BJP
32	Murtizapur	Harish Marotiappa Pimple	BJP
Washim District
33	Risod	Amit Subhashrao Zanak	INC
34	Washim	Lakhan Sahadeo Malik	BJP
35	Karanja	Rajendra Sukhanad Patni	BJP
Amravati District
36	Dhamamgaon Railway	Virendra Jagtap	INC
37	Badnera	Ravi Rana	Ind
38	Amravati	Sunil Deshmukh	BJP
39	Teosa	Yashomati Chandrakant Thakur	INC
40	Daryapur	Ramesh Ganpatrao Bundile	BJP
41	Melghat	Prabhudas Babulal Bhilawekar	BJP
42	Achalpur	Omprakash Babarao Kadu	Ind
43	Morshi	Anil Sukhdevrao Bonde	BJP
Wardha District
44	Arvi	Amar Sharadrao Kale	INC
45	Deoli	Ranjit Prataprao Kamble	INC
46	Hinganghat	Samir Trambakrao Kunawar	BJP
47	Wardha	Pankaj Rajesh Bhoyar	BJP
Nagpur District
48	Katol	Ashish Deshmukh	BJP
49	Savner	Sunil Chhatrapal Kedar	INC
50	Hingna	Sameer Meghe	BJP
51	Umred	Sudhir Laxmanrao Parwe	BJP
52	Nagpur South West	Devendra Fadnavis	BJP
53	Nagpur South	Sudhakar Vitthalrao Kohale	BJP
54	Nagpur East	Krishna Pancham Khopde	BJP
55	Nagpur Central	Vikas Shankarrao Kumbhare	BJP
56	Nagpur West	Sudhakar Shamrao Deshmukh	BJP
57	Nagpur North	Milind Mane	BJP
58	Kamthi	Chandrashekhar Bawankule	BJP
59	Ramtek	Dwaram Mallikarjun Reddy	BJP
Bhandara District
60	Tumsar	Charan Waghmare	BJP
61	Bhandara	Ramchandra Punaji Avsare	BJP
62	Sakoli	Rajesh Lahanu Kashiwar	BJP
Gondiya District
63	Arjuni Morgaon	Rajkumar Badole	BJP
64	Tirora	Vijay Bharatlal Rahangdale	BJP
65	Gondiya	Gopaldas Shankarlal Agrawal	INC
66	Amgaon	Sanjay Hanmantrao Puram	BJP
Gadchiroli District
67	Armori	Krishna Damaji Gajbe	BJP
68	Gadchiroli	Deorao Madguji Holi	BJP
69	Aheri	Ambrishrao Satyavanrao Atram	BJP
Chandrapur District
70	Rajura	Sanjay Yadaorao Dhote	BJP
71	Chandrapur	Nanaji Sitaram Shamkule	BJP
72	Ballarpur	Sudhir Mungantiwar	BJP
73	Brahmapuri	Vijay Namdevrao Wadettiwar	INC
74	Chimur	Bunty Bhangdiya	BJP
75	Warora	Suresh Dhanorkar	SS
Yavatmal District
76	Wani	Sanjivreddi Bapurao Bodkurwar	BJP
77	Ralegaon	Ashok Uike	BJP
78	Yavatmal	Madan Madhukarrao Yerawar	BJP
79	Digras	Sanjay Rathod	SS
80	Arni	Raju Narayan Todsam	BJP
81	Pusad	Manohar Naik	NCP
82	Umarkhed	Rajendra Waman Najardhane	BJP
Nanded District
83	Kinwat	Pradeep Jadhav	NCP
84	Hadgaon	Nagesh Patil	SS
85	Bhokar	Ameeta Chavan	INC
86	Nanded North	D. P. Sawant	INC
87	Nanded South	Hemant Patil	SS
88	Loha	Prataprao Chikhalikar	SS
89	Naigaon	Vasantrao Balwantrao Chavan	INC
90	Deglur	Subhash Piraji Sabne	SS
91	Mukhed	Govind Mukkaji Rathod	BJP
Hingoli District
92	Basmath	Jaiprakash Mundada	SS
93	Kalamnuri	Santosh Kautika Tarfe	INC
94	Hingoli	Tanaji Sakharamji Mutkule	BJP
Parbhani District
95	Jintur	Vijay Manikrao Bhamale	NCP
96	Parbhani	Rahul Vedprakash Patil	SS
97	Gangakhed	Madhusudan Kendre	NCP
98	Pathri	Mohan Fad	Ind
Jalna District
99	Partur	Babanrao Lonikar	BJP
100	Ghansawangi	Rajesh Tope	NCP
101	Jalna	Arjun Khotkar	SS
102	Badnapur	Narayan Tilakchand Kuche	BJP
103	Bhokardan	Santosh Danve	BJP
Aurangabad District
104	Sillod	Abdul Sattar	INC
105	Kannad	Harshvardhan Jadhav	SS
106	Phulambri	Haribhau Bagade	BJP
107	Aurangabad Central	Imtiyaz Jaleel	AIMIM
108	Aurangabad West	Sanjay Shirsat	SS
109	Aurangabad East	Atul Moreshwar Save	BJP
110	Paithan	Sandipanrao Bhumre	SS
111	Gangapur	Prashant Bamb	BJP
112	Vaijapur	Bhausaheb Patil Chikatgaonkar	NCP
Nashik District
113	Nandgaon	Pankaj Bhujbal	NCP
114	Malegaon Central	Shaikh Aasif Shaikh Rashid	INC
115	Malegaon Outer	Dadaji Bhuse	SS
116	Baglan	Dipika Sanjay Chavan	NCP
117	Kalwan	Jiva Pandu Gavit	CPI(M)
118	Chandvad	Rahul Aher	BJP
119	Yewla	Chhagan Bhujbal	NCP
120	Sinnar	Rajabhau Waje	SS
121	Niphad	Anil Kadam	SS
122	Dindori	Zirwal Narhari Sitaram	NCP
123	Nashik East	Balasaheb Mahadu Sanap	BJP
124	Nashik Central	Devayani Farande	BJP
125	Nashik West	Seema Mahesh Hiray	BJP
126	Devlali	Yogesh Gholap	SS
127	Igatpuri	Nirmala Gavit	INC
Palghar District
128	Dahanu	Dhanare Paskal Janya	BJP
129	Vikramgad	Vishnu Savara	BJP
130	Palghar	Krushna Ghoda	SS
131	Boisar	Vilas Tare	BVA
132	Nalasopara	Kshitij Thakur	BVA
133	Vasai	Hitendra Thakur	BVA
Thane District
134	Bhiwandi Rural	Shantaram More	SS
135	Shahapur	Pandurang Barora	NCP
136	Bhiwandi West	Mahesh Prabhakar Choughule	BJP
137	Bhiwandi East	Rupesh Mhatre	SS
138	Kalyan West	Narendra Pawar	BJP
139	Murbad	Kisan Shankar Kathore	BJP
140	Ambernath	Balaji Kinikar	SS
141	Ulhasnagar	Jyoti Kalani	NCP
142	Kalyan East	Ganpat Kalu Gaikwad	Ind
143	Dombivali	Ravindra Chavan	BJP
144	Kalyan Rural	Subhash Bhoir	SS
145	Mira Bhayandar	Narendra Mehta	BJP
146	Ovala-Majiwada	Pratap Sarnaik	SS
147	Kopri-Pachpakhadi	Eknath Shinde	SS
148	Thane	Sanjay Kelkar	BJP
149	Mumbra-Kalwa	Jitendra Awhad	NCP
150	Airoli	Sandeep Naik	NCP
151	Belapur	Manda Mhatre	BJP
Mumbai Suburban
152	Borivali	Vinod Tawde	BJP
153	Dahisar	Manisha Choudhary	BJP
154	Magathane	Prakash Surve	SS
155	Mulund	Sardar Tara Singh	BJP
156	Vikhroli	Sunil Raut	SS
157	Bhandup West	Ashok Patil	SS
158	Jogeshwari East	Ravindra Waikar	SS
159	Dindoshi	Sunil Prabhu	SS
160	Kandivali East	Atul Bhatkhalkar	BJP
161	Charkop	Yogesh Sagar	BJP
162	Malad West	Aslam Shaikh	INC
163	Goregaon	Vidya Thakur	BJP
164	Versova	Bharati Hemant Lavekar	BJP
165	Andheri West	Ameet Bhaskar Satam	BJP
166	Andheri East	Ramesh Latke	SS
167	Vile Parle	Parag Alavani	BJP
168	Chandivali	Naseem Khan	INC
169	Ghatkopar West	Ram Kadam	BJP
170	Ghatkopar East	Prakash Mehta	BJP
171	Mankhurd Shivaji Nagar	Abu Azmi	SP
172	Anushakti Nagar	Tukaram Ramkrishna Kate	SS
173	Chembur	Prakash Phaterpekar	SS
174	Kurla	Mangesh Kudalkar	SS
175	Kalina	Sanjay Potnis	SS
176	Vandre East	Bala Sawant	SS
177	Vandre West	Ashish Shelar	BJP
Mumbai City District
178	Dharavi	Varsha Gaikwad	INC
179	Sion Koliwada	Captain R. Tamil Selvan	BJP
180	Wadala	Kalidas Kolambkar	INC
181	Mahim	Sada Sarvankar	SS
182	Worli	Sunil Shinde	SS
183	Shivadi	Ajay Choudhari	SS
184	Byculla	Waris Pathan	AIMIM
185	Malabar Hill	Mangal Lodha	BJP
186	Mumbadevi	Amin Patel	INC
187	Colaba	Raj K. Purohit	BJP
Raigad District
188	Panvel	Prashant Thakur	BJP
189	Karjat	Suresh Narayan Lad	NCP
190	Uran	Manohar Bhoir	SS
191	Pen	Dhairyashil Patil	PWPI
192	Alibag	Panditshet Patil	PWPI
193	Shrivardhan	Avdhoot Tatkare	NCP
194	Mahad	Bharatshet Gogawale	SS
Pune District
195	Junnar	Atul Vallabh Benke	NCP
196	Ambegaon	Dilip Walse-Patil	NCP
197	Khed Alandi	Dilip Dattatray Mohite	NCP
198	Shirur	Ashok Raosaheb Pawar	NCP
199	Daund	Rahul Kul	RSP
200	Indapur	Dattatray Bharne	NCP
201	Baramati	Ajit Pawar	NCP
202	Purandar	Sanjay Chandukaka Jagtap	INC
203	Bhor	Sangram Thopate	INC
204	Maval	Sunil Shankarrao Shelke	BJP
205	Chinchwad	Laxman Pandurang Jagtap	BJP
206	Pimpri	Anna Dadu Bansode	NCP
207	Bhosari	Mahesh Landge	Ind
208	Vadgaon Sheri	Sunil Anna Tingre	NCP
209	Shivajinagar	Siddharth Anil Shirole	BJP
210	Kothrud	Chandrakant (Dada) BACHHU PATIL	BJP
211	Khadakwasla	Bhimrao Tapkir	BJP
212	Parvati	Madhuri Misal	BJP
213	Hadapsar	Chetan Vitthal Tupe	NCP
214	Pune Cantonment	Kamble Sunil Dnyandev	BJP
215	Kasba Peth	Mukta Shailesh Tilak	BJP
Ahmednagar District
216	Akole	Vaibhav Pichad	NCP
217	Sangamner	Balasaheb Thorat	INC
218	Shirdi	Radhakrishna Vikhe Patil	INC
219	Kopargaon	Snehalata Kolhe	BJP
220	Shrirampur	Bhausaheb Kamble	INC
221	Nevasa	Balasaheb Murkute	BJP
222	Shevgaon	Monika Rajiv Rajale	BJP
223	Rahuri	Shivaji Kardile	BJP
224	Parner	Vijayrao Auti	SS
225	Ahmednagar City	Sangram Jagtap	NCP
226	Shrigonda	Rahul Jagtap	NCP
227	Karjat Jamkhed	Ram Shinde	BJP
Beed District
228	Georai	Laxman Pawar	BJP
229	Majalgaon	R.T. Deshmukh	BJP
230	Beed	Jaidatta Kshirsagar	NCP
231	Ashti	Bhimrao Dhonde	BJP
232	Kaij	Sangita Thombare	BJP
233	Parli	Pankaja Munde	BJP
Latur District
234	Latur Rural	Trimbakrao Bhise	INC
235	Latur City	Amit Deshmukh	INC
236	Ahmadpur	Vinayakrao Jadhav	Ind
237	Udgir	Sudhakar Bhalerao	BJP
238	Nilanga	Sambhaji Patil Nilangekar	BJP
239	Ausa	Basavraj Patil	INC
Osmanabad District
240	Umarga	Dnyanraj Chougule	SS
241	Tuljapur	Madhukarrao Chavan	INC
242	Osmanabad	Rana Jagjit Sinha Patil	NCP
243	Paranda	Rahul Mote	NCP
Solapur District
244	Karmala	Narayan Patil	SS
245	Madha	Babanrao Shinde	NCP
246	Barshi	Dilip Sopal	NCP
247	Mohol	Ramesh Kadam	NCP
248	Solapur City North	Vijay Deshmukh	BJP
249	Solapur City Central	Praniti Shinde	INC
250	Akkalkot	Siddharam Mhetre	INC
251	Solapur South	Subhash Sureshchandra Deshmukh	BJP
252	Pandharpur	Bharat Bhalke	INC
253	Sangola	Ganpatrao Deshmukh	PWPI
254	Malsiras	Hanumant Dolas	NCP
Satara District
255	Phaltan	Dipak Pralhad Chavan	NCP
256	Wai	Makarand Laxmanrao Jadhav Patil	NCP
257	Koregaon	Shashikant Shinde	NCP
258	Man	Jaykumar Gore	INC
259	Karad North	Shamrao Pandurang Patil	NCP
260	Karad South	Prithviraj Chavan	INC
261	Patan	Shambhuraj Desai	SS
262	Satara	Shivendra Raje Bhosale	NCP
Ratnagiri District
263	Dapoli	Sanjay Kadam	NCP
264	Guhagar	Bhaskar Jadhav	NCP
265	Chiplun	Sadanand Chavan	SS
266	Ratnagiri	Uday Samant	SS
267	Rajapur	Rajan Salvi	SS
Sindhudurg District
268	Kankavli	Nitesh Rane	INC
269	Kudal	Vaibhav Naik	SS
270	Sawantwadi	Deepak Kesarkar	SS
Kolhapur District
271	Chandgad	Sandhyadevi Desai	NCP
272	Radhanagari	Prakashrao Abitkar	SS
273	Kagal	Hasan Mushrif	NCP
274	Kolhapur South	Amal Mahadik	BJP
275	Karvir	Chandradip Narke	SS
276	Kolhapur North	Rajesh Vinayakrao Kshirsagar	SS
277	Shahuwadi	Satyajeet Patil	SS
278	Hatkanangale	Sujit Minchekar	SS
279	Ichalkaranji	Suresh Ganpati Halvankar	BJP
280	Shirol	Ulhas Patil	SS
Sangli District
281	Miraj	Suresh Khade	BJP
282	Sangli	Sudhir Gadgil	BJP
283	Islampur	Jayant Patil	NCP
284	Shirala	Shivajirao Naik	BJP
285	Palus-Kadegaon	Patangrao Kadam	INC
286	Khanapur	Anil Babar	SS
287	Tasgaon-Kavathe Mahankal	R. R. Patil	NCP
288	Jat	Vilasrao Jagtap	BJP
