= 11th Maharashtra Assembly =

←	10th Maharashtra Assembly	12th Maharashtra Assembly	→
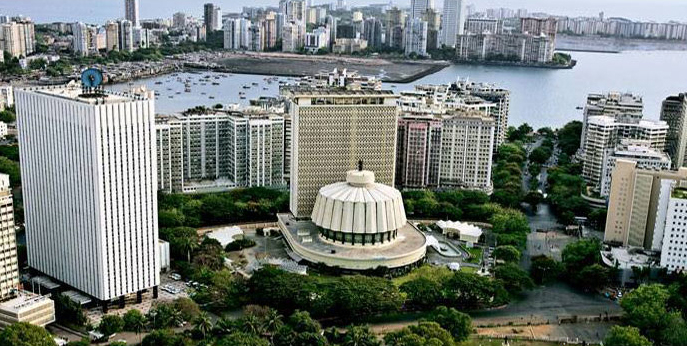
- Maharashtra Vidhan Sabha Mumbai

Overview
- Legislative body: Maharashtra Legislature
- Term: 13 October 2004 – 7 November 2009
- Election: 2004 Maharashtra Legislative Assembly election
- Government: Second Deshmukh ministry; First Ashok Chavan ministry

Sovereign
- Governor: Mohammed Fazal; S. M. Krishna; S. C. Jamir

House of the People
- Members: 288
- Speaker of the House: Babasaheb Kupekar
- Duputy Speaker of the House: Pramod Bhaurao Shende
- Chief Minister: Vilasrao Deshmukh; Ashok Chavan
- Deputy Chief Minister: R R Patil; Chhagan Bhujbal
- Leader of the House: Vilasrao Deshmukh; Ashok Chavan
- Leader of the Opposition: Ramdas Kadam
- Party control: Democratic Front (India)

The Members of 11th Legislative Assembly of Maharashtra were elected during the 2004 Maharashtra Legislative Assembly election, with results announced on 17 October 2004.

The ruling INC-NCP(Democratic Front) won the elections gaining 69 and 71 Seats respectively and winning 152 seats in alliance with support of independents and smaller parties. The Nationalist Congress Party emerged as the single largest party winning 71 seats. The opposition Shiv Sena-Bharatiya Janata Party lost the election gaining 62 and 54 seats respectively and winning 116 seats in alliance. Incumbent CM Vilasrao Deshmukh of the Indian National Congress was again sworn in as the Chief minister of Maharashtra with Chhagan Bhujbal of the Nationalist Congress Party as the Deputy Chief Minister of Maharashtra.

== Members ==
- Speaker:
  - Babasaheb Kupekar, NCP
- Deputy Speaker:
  - Pramod Bhaurao Shende, INC
- Chief minister:
  - Vilasrao Deshmukh, INC

(1 November 2004 – 5 December 2008)

  - Ashok Chavan, INC

(8 December 2008 – 15 October 2009)

- Deputy Chief Minister:
  - R R Patil, NCP

(1 November 2004 – 5 December 2008)

  - Chhagan Bhujbal, NCP

(8 December 2008 – 10 November 2010)

- Leaders of The House:
  - Vilasrao Deshmukh, INC

(1 November 2004 – 5 December 2008)

  - Ashok Chavan, INC

(8 December 2008 – 15 October 2009)

- Leader of Opposition:
  - Narayan Rane, SHS

(1 November 2004 - 12 July 2005)

  - Ramdas Kadam, SHS

(1 October 2005 - 3 November 2009)

=== Party-wise seats ===
Parties and Coalitions	Seats	Leader
Nationalist Congress Party 71 / 288 (25%)	71	Chhagan Bhujbal
Indian National Congress 69 / 288 (24%)	69	Vilasrao Deshmukh
Shiv Sena 62 / 288 (22%)	62	Ramdas Kadam
Bharatiya Janata Party 54 / 288 (19%)	54	Gopinath Munde
Independents/Others 32 / 288 (11%)	32	
