= Sanjay Kute =

Indian politician

Dr. Sanjay Kute

Minister of Labour Government of Maharashtra
- In office 16 June 2019 – 8 November 2019
- Chief Minister: Devendra Fadnavis
- Preceded by: Sambhaji Patil Nilangekar
- Succeeded by: Dilip Walse-Patil

Member of the Maharashtra Legislative Assembly
- Incumbent
- Assumed office 2009
- Preceded by: Constituency Created
- Constituency: Jalgaon (Jamod)
- In office 2004–2009
- Preceded by: Krushnrao Ingle
- Succeeded by: Constituency Abolished
- Constituency: Jalamb

Personal details
- Born: 9 March 1969 (age 57) Madakhed, Tq. Jalgaon Jamod, Buldhana District
- Party: Bharatiya Janata Party
- Spouse: Aparna Kute
- Children: Abhishek Kute; Shantanu Kute
- Parent: Shreeram Kute (father)
- Education: B.A.M.S
- Alma mater: Amravati University
- Occupation: Politician

Dr. Sanjay Kute is a member of 11th, 12th, 13th, 14th, 15th Maharashtra Legislative Assembly. He represents the Jalgaon (Jamod) Assembly constituency. He belongs to the Bharatiya Janata Party. Kute was a member of the 11th and 12th Assemblies too, and has been president of Buldhana district Bharatiya Janata Party. In July, 2007, Kute was arrested during an agitation for compensation to rain hit farmers.

== Political career ==
Sanjay kute is a member of the Rashtriya Swayamsevak Sangh (RSS), a far-right Hindu nationalist paramilitary volunteer organisation.

- General Secretary, Maharashtra State BJP (2014)
- District President, Jalgaon Jamod, BJP (2003-2006)
- President BJP Buldhana District (Since 2010)
- Vice President of BJP Maharashtra (2020)
