= List of leaders of the house in the Maharashtra Legislative Assembly =

Caucus head of the majority party in the lower house in Maharashtra

Leader of the House of the Maharashtra Legislative Assembly
- सभागृह नेते महाराष्ट्र विधानसभा
- Seal of the state of Maharashtra

- Flag of India

- Incumbent; Devendra Fadnavis since 05 December 2024; Bharatiya Janata Party
- Maharashtra Legislative Assembly
- Style: The Honourable
- Member of: Council of ministers; Cabinet; Maharashtra Legislative Assembly
- Reports to: Government of Maharashtra
- Residence: Varsha Bungalow, South Mumbai, Mumbai, Maharashtra, India
- Seat: Maharashtra Legislature
- Nominator: Chief Minister of Maharashtra & Cabinet
- Appointer: Speaker of the Maharashtra Legislative Assembly
- Term length: During the life of the vidhan Sabha (five years maximum)
- Constituting instrument: -
- Precursor: Eknath Shinde, SS (2022 - 2024)
- Inaugural holder: Yashwantrao Chavan INC (1960 - 1962)
- Formation: 1 May 1960
- Deputy: Eknath Shinde; Sunetra Ajit Pawar
- Salary: ₹ - approximately
- Website: -

Devendra Fadnavis is the current Leader of the House of the Maharashtra Legislative Assembly.

== Leader of the House ==
The Assembly has a Leader of the House, who heads the government caucus. The office is provided for in the Legislative Council Rules, which defines it as "Chief Minister or any other Minister appointed by Chief Minister". The Rules further mandate that the chairperson should conduct parliamentary business in consultation with the Leader.

No.	Portrait	Name	Constituency	Term of office			Assembly (Election)	Party	Deputy Leader of the House	Speaker of the House	Ministry	Chief Minister
1		Yashwantrao Chavan यशवंतराव चव्हाण (Chief Minister)	(MLA for Karad North Constituency No. 259- Satara District) (Legislative Assembly)	1 May 1960	8 March 1962	1 year, 311 days	1st (1960*)	Indian National Congress	Marotrao Kannamwar (Cabinet Minister)	S. L. Silam	First Yashwantrao Chavan ministry (Maharashtra)	Self
2		Yashwantrao Chavan यशवंतराव चव्हाण (Chief Minister)	(MLA for Karad North Constituency No. 259- Satara District) (Legislative Assembly)	8 March 1962	19 November 1962	256 days	2nd (1962)	Indian National Congress	Marotrao Kannamwar (Cabinet Minister)	S. L. Silam; Balasaheb Bharde	Second Yashwantrao Chavan ministry	Self
3	-	Marotrao Kannamwar मारोतराव कन्नमवार (Chief Minister)	(MLA for Saoli Constituency No. 73- Chandrapur District) (Legislative Assembly)	20 November 1962	24 November 1963	1 year, 4 days	2nd (1962)	Indian National Congress	Vasantrao Naik (Cabinet Minister)	Balasaheb Bharde	Kannamwar ministry	Self
4	-	P. K. Sawant पी. के. सावंत (Chief Minister)	(MLA for Chiplun Constituency No. 265- Ratnagiri District) (Legislative Assembly)	25 November 1963	4 December 1963	9 days	2nd (1962)	Indian National Congress	Keshavrao Sonawane (Cabinet Minister)	Balasaheb Bharde	P. K. Sawant ministry	Self
5		Vasantrao Naik वसंतराव नाईक (Chief Minister)	(MLA for Pusad Constituency No. 81- Yavatmal District) (Legislative Assembly)	5 December 1963	1 March 1967	3 years, 86 days	2nd (1962)	Indian National Congress	A. R. Antulay (Cabinet Minister)	Balasaheb Bharde	First Vasantrao Naik ministry	Self
6		Vasantrao Naik वसंतराव नाईक (Chief Minister)	(MLA for Pusad Constituency No. 81- Yavatmal District) (Legislative Assembly)	1 March 1967	13 March 1972	5 years, 12 days	3rd (1967)	Indian National Congress	Shankarrao Chavan (Cabinet Minister)	Balasaheb Bharde	Second Vasantrao Naik ministry	Self
7		Vasantrao Naik वसंतराव नाईक (Chief Minister)	(MLA for Pusad Constituency No. 81- Yavatmal District) (Legislative Assembly)	13 March 1972	20 February 1975	2 years, 344 days	4th (1972)	Indian National Congress	Pratibha Patil (Cabinet Minister)	S. K. Wankhede	Third Vasantrao Naik ministry	Self
8		Shankarrao Chavan शंकरराव चव्हाण (Chief Minister)	(MLA for Bhokar Constituency No. 85- Nanded District) (Legislative Assembly)	21 February 1975	16 May 1977	2 years, 84 days	4th (1972)	Indian National Congress	Vasantdada Patil (Cabinet Minister)	S. K. Wankhede; Balasaheb Desai	First Shankarrao Chavan ministry	Self
9	-	S. K. Wankhede शेषराव कृष्णराव वानखेडे (Industries Minister)	(MLA for Sawargoan Constituency No. 49- Nagpur District) (Legislative Assembly)	17 May 1977	5 March 1978	292 days	4th (1972)	Indian National Congress	Sundarrao Solanke (Cabinet Minister)	Balasaheb Desai	First Vasantdada Patil ministry	Vasantdada Patil
10		Vasantdada Patil वसंतदादा पाटील (Chief Minister)	(MLA for Sangli Constituency No. 282- Sangli District) (Legislative Assembly)	5 March 1978	18 July 1978	76 days	5th (1978)	Indian National Congress	Nashikrao Tirpude (Deputy Chief Minister)	Balasaheb Desai; Shivraj Patil	Second Vasantdada Patil ministry	Self
11		Sharad Pawar शरद पवार (Chief Minister)	(MLA for Baramati Constituency No. 201- Pune District) (Legislative Assembly)	18 July 1978	18 February 1980	1 year, 215 days	5th (1978)	Indian Congress (Socialist)	Sundarrao Solanke (Deputy Chief Minister)	Shivraj Patil; Pranlal Vora	First Pawar ministry	Self
12		A. R. Antulay अब्दुल रहमान अंतुले (Chief Minister)	(MLA for Shrivardhan Constituency No. 193- Raigad District) (Legislative Assembly)	9 June 1980	12 January 1982	1 year, 217 days	6th (1980)	Indian National Congress	Jawaharlal Darda (Cabinet Minister)	Pranlal Vora; Sharad Dighe	Antulay ministry	Self
13		Babasaheb Bhosale बाबासाहेब भोसले (Chief Minister)	(MLA for Nehrunagar Constituency No. 172- Mumbai Suburban District) (Legislative Assembly)	13 January 1982	1 February 1983	1 year, 19 days	6th (1980)	Indian National Congress	Shalini Patil (Cabinet Minister)	Sharad Dighe	Bhosale ministry	Self
14		Vasantdada Patil वसंतदादा पाटील (Chief Minister)	(MLA for Sangli Constituency No. 282- Sangli District) (Legislative Assembly)	7 February 1983	5 March 1985	2 years, 26 days	6th (1980)	Indian National Congress	Ramrao Adik (Deputy Chief Minister)	Sharad Dighe; Shankarrao Jagtap	Third Vasantdada Patil ministry	Self
15	-	Surupsingh Hirya Naik सुरुपसिंग हिर्या नाईक (Forest Department Minister)	(MLA for Navapur Constituency No. 04- Nandurbar District) (Legislative Assembly)	12 March 1985	1 June 1985	81 days	6th (1980)	Indian National Congress	Sudhakarrao Naik (Cabinet Minister)	Shankarrao Jagtap	Fourth Vasantdada Patil ministry	Vasantdada Patil
16	-	Shivajirao Patil Nilangekar शिवाजीराव पाटील निलंगेकर (Chief Minister)	(MLA for Nilanga Constituency No. 238- Latur District) (Legislative Assembly)	4 June 1985	6 March 1986	275 days	7th (1985)	Indian National Congress	V. Subramaniam (Cabinet Minister)	Shankarrao Jagtap	Nilangekar ministry	Self
17	-	V. Subramanian व्ही. सुब्रमण्यम (Urban Development Minister)	(MLA for South Mumbai Constituency No. 121- Mumbai City District) (Legislative Assembly)	12 March 1986	26 June 1988	2 years, 106 days	7th (1985)	Indian National Congress	Bhagwantrao Gaikwad (Cabinet Minister)	Shankarrao Jagtap	Second Shankarrao Chavan ministry	Shankarrao Chavan
18		Sharad Pawar शरद पवार (Chief Minister)	(MLA for Baramati Constituency No. 201- Pune District) (Legislative Assembly)	26 June 1988	3 March 1990	1 year, 222 days	7th (1985)	Indian National Congress	Sushilkumar Shinde (Cabinet Minister)	Shankarrao Jagtap	Second Pawar ministry	Self
19		Sharad Pawar शरद पवार (Chief Minister)	(MLA for Baramati Constituency No. 201- Pune District) (Legislative Assembly)	4 March 1990	25 June 1991	1 year, 113 days	8th (1990)	Indian National Congress	Padamsinh Bajirao Patil (Cabinet Minister)	Madhukarrao Chaudhari	Third Pawar ministry	Self
20	-	Sudhakarrao Naik सुधाकरराव नाईक (Chief Minister)	(MLA for Pusad Constituency No. 81- Yavatmal District) (Legislative Assembly)	25 June 1991	22 February 1993	1 year, 242 days	8th (1990)	Indian National Congress	Ramrao Adik (Cabinet Minister)	Madhukarrao Chaudhari	Sudhakarrao Naik ministry	Self
21		Sharad Pawar शरद पवार (Chief Minister)	(MLA for Baramati Constituency No. 201- Pune District) (Legislative Assembly)	6 March 1993	14 March 1995	2 years, 8 days	8th (1990)	Indian National Congress	Vilasrao Deshmukh (Cabinet Minister)	Madhukarrao Chaudhari	Fourth Pawar ministry	Self
22		Manohar Joshi मनोहर जोशी (Chief Minister)	(MLA for Dadar Constituency No. 181- Mumbai City District) (Legislative Assembly)	14 March 1995	1 February 1999	3 years, 324 days	9th (1995)	Shiv Sena	Gopinath Munde (Deputy Chief Minister)	Dattaji Nalawade	Manohar Joshi ministry	Self
23		Narayan Rane नारायण राणे (Chief Minister)	(MLA for Malvan Constituency No. 269- Sindhudurg District) (Legislative Assembly)	1 February 1999	17 October 1999	258 days	9th (1995)	Shiv Sena	Gopinath Munde (Deputy Chief Minister)	Dattaji Nalawade	Narayan Rane ministry	Self
24		Vilasrao Deshmukh विलासराव देशमुख (Chief Minister)	(MLA for Latur City Constituency No. 235- Latur District) (Legislative Assembly)	18 October 1999	16 January 2003	3 years, 92 days	10th (1999)	Indian National Congress	Chhagan Bhujbal (Deputy Chief Minister)	Arun Gujarathi	First Deshmukh ministry	Self
25		Sushil Kumar Shinde सुशील कुमार शिंदे (Chief Minister)	(MLA for Solapur South Constituency No. 251- Solapur District) (Legislative Assembly)	18 January 2003	30 October 2004	1 year, 286 days	10th (1999)	Indian National Congress	Chhagan Bhujbal (Deputy Chief Minister) (2003 - 2003); Vijaysingh Mohite-Patil (Deputy Chief Minister) (2003 - 2004)	Arun Gujarathi	Sushilkumar Shinde ministry	Self
26		Vilasrao Deshmukh विलासराव देशमुख (Chief Minister)	(MLA for Latur City Constituency No. 235- Latur District) (Legislative Assembly)	1 November 2004	8 December 2008	4 years, 37 days	11th (2004)	Indian National Congress	R. R. Patil (Deputy Chief Minister)	Babasaheb Kupekar	Second Deshmukh ministry	Self
27		Ashok Chavan अशोक चव्हाण (Chief Minister)	(MLA for Bhokar Constituency No. 85- Nanded District) (Legislative Assembly)	8 December 2008	7 November 2009	334 days	11th (2004)	Indian National Congress	Chhagan Bhujbal (Deputy Chief Minister)	Babasaheb Kupekar	First Ashok Chavan ministry	Self
28		Ashok Chavan अशोक चव्हाण (Chief Minister)	(MLA for Bhokar Constituency No. 85- Nanded District) (Legislative Assembly)	7 November 2009	10 November 2010	1 year, 3 days	12th (2009)	Indian National Congress	Chhagan Bhujbal (Deputy Chief Minister)	Dilip Walse-Patil.	Second Ashok Chavan ministry	Self
29		Prithviraj Chavan पृथ्वीराज चव्हाण (Chief Minister)	(MLC for Elected by MLAs Constituency No. 19 - Satara District) (Legislative Council)	11 November 2010	26 September 2014	3 years, 349 days	12th (2009)	Indian National Congress	Ajit Pawar (Deputy Chief Minister); Chhagan Bhujbal (Cabinet Minister); Ajit Pawar (Deputy Chief Minister)	Dilip Walse-Patil	Prithviraj Chavan ministry	Self
30		Devendra Fadnavis देवेंद्र फडणवीस (Chief Minister)	(MLA for Nagpur South West Constituency No. 52- Nagpur District) (Legislative Assembly)	31 October 2014	12 November 2019	5 years, 12 days	13th (2014)	Bharatiya Janata Party	Eknath Khadse (Cabinet Minister) (2014 - 2016); Girish Mahajan (Cabinet Minister) (2016 - 2019)	Haribhau Bagade	First Fadnavis ministry	Self
31		Devendra Fadnavis देवेंद्र फडणवीस (Chief Minister)	(MLA for Nagpur South West Constituency No. 52- Nagpur District) (Legislative Assembly)	23 November 2019	26 November 2019	3 days	14th (2019)	Bharatiya Janata Party	Ajit Pawar (Deputy Chief Minister)	Kalidas Kolambkar; (Pro Tem Speaker)	Second Fadnavis ministry	Self
32		Uddhav Thackeray उद्धव ठाकरे (Chief Minister)	(MLC for Elected by MLAs Constituency No. 25 - Mumbai Suburban District) (Legislative Council)	28 November 2019	29 June 2022	2 years, 213 days	14th (2019)	Shiv Sena	Eknath Shinde (Cabinet Minister) (2019 - 2019); Ajit Pawar (Deputy Chief Minister) (2019 - 2022)	Nana Patole; Narhari Sitaram Zirwal (Acting)	Thackeray ministry	Self
33		Eknath Shinde एकनाथ शिंदे (Chief Minister)	(MLA for Kopri-Pachpakhadi Constituency No. 147- Thane District) (Legislative Assembly)	3 July 2022	26 November 2024	2 years, 146 days	14th (2019)	Shiv Sena (Shinde Group)	Devendra Fadnavis (Deputy Chief Minister) (2022 - 2024); Ajit Pawar (Deputy Chief Minister) (2023 - 2024)	Narhari Sitaram Zirwal (Acting); Rahul Narwekar	Eknath Shinde ministry	Self
34		Devendra Fadnavis देवेंद्र फडणवीस (Chief Minister)	(MLA for Nagpur South West Constituency No. 52- Nagpur District) (Legislative Assembly)	5 December 2024	Incumbent	1 year, 276 days	15th (2024)	Bharatiya Janata Party	Eknath Shinde (Deputy Chief Minister); (2024–Present): Ajit Pawar (Deputy Chief Minister); (2024–2026): Sunetra Ajit Pawar (Deputy Chief Minister); (2026–Present)	Rahul Narwekar	Third Fadnavis ministry	Self

== Deputy Leader of the House ==
The Assembly has a Deputy Leader of the House, who heads the government caucus. The office is provided for in the Legislative Assembly Rules, which defines it as "Deputy Chief Minister or any other Minister appointed by Chief Minister". The Rules further mandate that the Chairperson should conduct parliamentary business in consultation with the Leader.

Name Deputy Leader of the House	Constituency	Ministerial offices held	Term			Party	Assembly (Election)	Leader of the House	Speaker of the House	Ministry	Chief Minister
Jawaharlal Darda जवाहरलाल दर्डा	(MLC for Elected by MLAs Constituency No. 19 - Yavatmal District) (Legislative Council)	Cabinet Minister	09 June 1980	12 January 1982	1 year, 217 days	Indian National Congress	07th Assembly (1980 election)	Abdul Rahman Antulay	Sharad Dighe	Antulay ministry	Abdul Rahman Antulay
Shalini Patil शालिनी पाटील	(MLA for Koregaon Constituency No. 257- Satara District) (Legislative Assembly)	Cabinet Minister	13 January 1982	1 February 1983	1 year, 19 days	Indian National Congress	07th Assembly (1980 election)	Babasaheb Bhosale	Sharad Dighe	Bhosale ministry	Babasaheb Bhosale
Ramrao Adik रामराव आदिक	(MLC for Elected by MLAs Constituency No. 05 - Ahmednagar District) (Legislative Council)	Deputy Chief Minister	07 February 1983	05 March 1985	2 years, 26 days	Indian National Congress	07th Assembly (1980 election)	Vasantdada Patil	Sharad Dighe	Third Vasantdada Patil ministry	Vasantdada Patil
Sudhakarrao Naik सुधाकरराव नाईक	(MLA for Pusad Constituency No. 81- Yavatmal District) (Legislative Assembly)	Cabinet Minister	12 March 1985	01 June 1985	81 days	Indian National Congress	07th Assembly (1980 election)	Surupsingh Hirya Naik (Cabinet Minister)	Sharad Dighe	Fourth Vasantdada Patil ministry	Vasantdada Patil
V. Subramaniam व्ही. सुब्रमण्यम	(MLA for South Mumbai Constituency No. 121- Mumbai City District) (Legislative Assembly)	Cabinet Minister	04 June 1985	06 March 1986	275 days	Indian National Congress	08th Assembly (1985 election)	Shivajirao Patil Nilangekar	Shankarrao Jagtap	Nilangekar ministry	Shivajirao Patil Nilangekar
Bhagwantrao Gaikwad भगवंतराव गायकवाड	(MLC for Elected by MLAs Constituency No. 05 - Ahmednagar District) (Legislative Council)	Cabinet Minister	12 March 1986	26 June 1988	2 years, 106 days	Indian National Congress	08th Assembly (1985 election)	V. Subramaniam (Cabinet Minister)	Shankarrao Jagtap	Second Shankarrao Chavan ministry	Shankarrao Chavan
Sushilkumar Shinde सुशीलकुमार शिंदे	(MLA for Solapur City Central Constituency No. 249- Solapur District) (Legislative Assembly)	Cabinet Minister	26 June 1988	03 March 1990	1 year, 250 days	Indian National Congress	08th Assembly (1985 election)	Sharad Pawar	Shankarrao Jagtap	Second Pawar ministry	Sharad Pawar
Padamsinh Bajirao Patil पद्मसिंह बाजीराव पाटील	(MLA for Osmanabad Constituency No. 242- Osmanabad District (Legislative Assembly)	Cabinet Minister	04 March 1990	25 June 1991	1 year, 113 days	Indian National Congress	09th Assembly (1990 election)	Sharad Pawar	Madhukarrao Chaudhari	Third Pawar ministry	Sharad Pawar
Ramrao Adik रामराव आदिक	(MLC for Elected by MLAs Constituency No. 05 - Ahmednagar District) (Legislative Council)	Cabinet Minister	25 June 1991	22 February 1993	1 year, 245 days	Indian National Congress	09th Assembly (1990 election)	Sudhakarrao Naik	Madhukarrao Chaudhari	Sudhakarrao Naik ministry	Sudhakarrao Naik
Vilasrao Deshmukh विलासराव देशमुख	(MLA for Latur City Constituency No. 235- Latur District) (Legislative Assembly)	Cabinet Minister	06 March 1993	14 March 1995	2 years, 8 days	Indian National Congress	09th Assembly (1990 election)	Sharad Pawar	Madhukarrao Chaudhari	Fourth Pawar ministry	Sharad Pawar
Gopinath Munde गोपीनाथ मुंडे	(MLA for Renapur Constituency No. 236- Latur District) (Legislative Assembly)	Deputy Chief Minister	14 March 1995	01 February 1999	3 years, 324 days	Bhartiya Janata Party	09th Assembly (1999 election)	Manohar Joshi	Dattaji Nalawade	Manohar Joshi ministry	Manohar Joshi
Gopinath Munde गोपीनाथ मुंडे	(MLA for Renapur Constituency No. 236- Latur District) (Legislative Assembly)	Deputy Chief Minister	01 February 1999	17 October 1999	258 days	Bhartiya Janata Party	09th Assembly (1999 election)	Narayan Rane	Dattaji Nalawade	Narayan Rane ministry	Narayan Rane
Chhagan Bhujbal छगन भुजबळ	(MLA for Yevla Constituency No. 119- Nashik District) (Legislative Assembly)	Deputy Chief Minister	18 October 1999	16 January 2003	3 years, 90 days	Nationalist Congress Party	10th Assembly (1999 election)	Vilasrao Deshmukh	Arun Gujarathi	First Deshmukh ministry	Vilasrao Deshmukh
Chhagan Bhujbal छगन भुजबळ	(MLA for Yevla Constituency No. 119- Nashik District) (Legislative Assembly)	Deputy Chief Minister	18 January 2003	23 December 2003	340 days	Nationalist Congress Party	10th Assembly (1999 election)	Sushil Kumar Shinde	Arun Gujarathi	Sushilkumar Shinde ministry	Sushil Kumar Shinde
Vijaysinh Mohite–Patil विजयसिंह मोहिते-पाटील	(MLA for Malshiras Constituency No. 254- Solapur District) (Legislative Assembly)	Deputy Chief Minister	27 December 2003	01 November 2004	310 days	Nationalist Congress Party	10th Assembly (1999 election)	Sushil Kumar Shinde	Arun Gujarathi	Sushilkumar Shinde ministry	Sushil Kumar Shinde
R. R. Patil आर.आर.पाटील	(MLA for Tasgaon-Kavathe Mahankal Constituency No. 287- Sangli District) (Legislative Assembly)	Deputy Chief Minister	01 November 2004	08 December 2008	4 years, 37 days	Nationalist Congress Party	11th Assembly (2004 election)	Vilasrao Deshmukh	Babasaheb Kupekar	Second Deshmukh ministry	Vilasrao Deshmukh
Chhagan Bhujbal छगन भुजबळ	(MLA for Yevla Constituency No. 119- Nashik District) (Legislative Assembly)	Deputy Chief Minister	08 December 2008	06 November 2009	333 days	Nationalist Congress Party	11th Assembly (2004 election)	Ashok Chavan	Babasaheb Kupekar	First Ashok Chavan ministry	Ashok Chavan
Chhagan Bhujbal छगन भुजबळ	(MLA for Yevla Constituency No. 119- Nashik District) (Legislative Assembly)	Deputy Chief Minister	07 November 2009	10 November 2010	1 year, 3 days	Nationalist Congress Party	12th Assembly (2009 election)	Ashok Chavan	Dilip Walse-Patil	Second Ashok Chavan ministry	Ashok Chavan
Ajit Pawar अजित पवार	(MLA for Baramati Constituency No. 201- Pune District) (Legislative Assembly)	Deputy Chief Minister	11 November 2010	25 September 2012	1 year, 319 days	Nationalist Congress Party	12th Assembly (2009 election)	Prithviraj Chavan	Dilip Walse-Patil	Prithviraj Chavan ministry	Prithviraj Chavan
Chhagan Bhujbal छगन भुजबळ (Additional Charge)	(MLA for Yevla Constituency No. 119- Nashik District) (Legislative Assembly)	Cabinet Minister	26 September 2012	07 December 2012	72 days	Nationalist Congress Party	12th Assembly (2009 election)	Prithviraj Chavan	Dilip Walse-Patil	Prithviraj Chavan ministry	Prithviraj Chavan
Ajit Pawar अजित पवार	(MLA for Baramati Constituency No. 201- Pune District) (Legislative Assembly)	Deputy Chief Minister	07 December 2012	26 September 2014	1 year, 293 days	Nationalist Congress Party	12th Assembly (2009 election)	Prithviraj Chavan	Dilip Walse-Patil	Prithviraj Chavan ministry	Prithviraj Chavan
Eknath Khadse एकनाथ खडसे	(MLA for Muktainagar Constituency No. 20- Jalgaon District) (Legislative Assembly)	Cabinet Minister	31 October 2014	04 June 2016	1 year, 217 days	Bharatiya Janata Party	13th Assembly (2014 election)	Devendra Fadnavis	Haribhau Bagade	Devendra Fadanvis Ministry	Devendra Fadnavis
Girish Mahajan गिरीश महाजन	(MLA for Jamner Constituency No. 19- Jalgaon District) (Legislative Assembly)	Cabinet Minister	04 June 2016	12 November 2019	3 years, 161 days	Bharatiya Janata Party	13th Assembly (2014 election)	Devendra Fadnavis	Haribhau Bagade	Devendra Fadanvis Ministry	Devendra Fadnavis
Ajit Pawar अजित पवार	(MLA for Baramati Constituency No. 201- Pune District) (Legislative Assembly)	Deputy Chief Minister	23 November 2019	26 November 2019	3 days	Nationalist Congress Party	14th Assembly (2019 election)	Devendra Fadnavis	Kalidas Kolambkar (Pro Tem Speaker)	Second Fadnavis ministry	Devendra Fadnavis
Eknath Shinde एकनाथ शिंदे	(MLA for Kopri-Pachpakhadi Constituency No. 147- Thane District) (Legislative Assembly)	Cabinet Minister	28 November 2019	30 December 2019	31 days	Shiv Sena	14th Assembly (2019 election)	Uddhav Thackeray	Dilip Walse-Patil (Pro Tem Speaker); Nana Patole	Uddhav Thackrey Ministry	Uddhav Thackeray
Ajit Pawar अजित पवार	(MLA for Baramati Constituency No. 201- Pune District) (Legislative Assembly)	Deputy Chief Minister	30 December 2019	29 June 2022	2 years, 181 days	Nationalist Congress Party	14th Assembly (2019 election)	Uddhav Thackeray	Nana Patole; Zirwal Narhari Sitaram (Acting)	Uddhav Thackrey Ministry	Uddhav Thackeray
Devendra Fadnavis देवेंद्र फडणवीस	(MLA for Nagpur South West Constituency No. 52- Nagpur District) (Legislative Assembly)	Deputy Chief Minister	03 July 2022	26 November 2024	2 years, 146 days	Bharatiya Janata Party	14th Assembly (2019 election)	Eknath Shinde	Zirwal Narhari Sitaram (Acting); Rahul Narwekar	Eknath Shinde Ministry	Eknath Shinde
Ajit Pawar अजित पवार	(MLA for Baramati Constituency No. 201- Pune District) (Legislative Assembly)	Deputy Chief Minister	17 July 2023	26 November 2024	1 year, 132 days	Nationalist Congress Party	14th Assembly (2019 election)	Eknath Shinde	Rahul Narwekar	Eknath Shinde Ministry	Eknath Shinde
Eknath Shinde एकनाथ शिंदे	(MLA for Kopri-Pachpakhadi Constituency No. 147- Thane District) (Legislative Assembly)	Deputy Chief Minister	05 December 2024	Incumbent	1 year, 276 days	Shiv Sena	15th Assembly (2024 election)	Devendra Fadnavis	Rahul Narwekar	Third Fadnavis ministry	Devendra Fadnavis
Ajit Pawar अजित पवार	(MLA for Baramati Constituency No. 201- Pune District) (Legislative Assembly)	Deputy Chief Minister	05 December 2024	28 January 2026	1 year, 54 days	Nationalist Congress Party	15th Assembly (2024 election)	Devendra Fadnavis	Rahul Narwekar	Third Fadnavis ministry	Devendra Fadnavis
Sunetra Ajit Pawar सुनेत्रा अजित पवार	(Not Elected Any Constituency of Maharashtra Legislature- Pune District) (Legislative Assembly / Legislative Council)	Deputy Chief Minister	31 January 2026	Incumbent	219 days	Nationalist Congress Party	15th Assembly (2024 election)	Devendra Fadnavis	Rahul Narwekar	Third Fadnavis ministry	Devendra Fadnavis

== See also ==
- List of governors of Maharashtra
- List of chief ministers of Maharashtra
