= List of leaders of the opposition in the Maharashtra Legislative Assembly =

LoP in MH state

Leader of the Opposition in Maharashtra Legislative Assembly
- Seal of the state of Maharashtra
- Incumbent; Vacant since 26 November 2024
- Maharashtra Legislative Assembly
- Style: The Hon’ble
- Member of: Maharashtra Legislative Assembly
- Reports to: Government of Maharashtra
- Residence: Mumbai
- Seat: Maharashtra Legislature
- Nominator: Members of Official Opposition
- Appointer: Speaker of the Maharashtra Legislative Assembly
- Term length: During the life of the Legislative Assembly (five years maximum)
- Inaugural holder: Ramchandra Dhondiba Bhandare
- Salary: ₹ - approximately

The leader of the opposition in the Maharashtra Legislative Assembly is an elected member of the Maharashtra Legislative Assembly who leads the official opposition in the lower house of the Maharashtra Legislature. The leader of the opposition is the legislature speaker of the party with the most seats after the government party.

The post has been vacant since 26 November 2024 since no opposition party currently holds 10% of the total seats of the house.

== Leaders of the opposition ==
The Assembly's opposition parties elect a leader of the opposition. This is commonly the leader of the largest non-government party, and is recognized as such by the speaker. The following is the list of leaders of the opposition in the assembly.

#	Portrait	Name	Constituency	Tenure			Assembly (election)	Chief Minister	Party
Pre-Independence Bombay Legislative Assembly (1937–47)
1		Ali Muhammad Khan Dehlavi	Surat and Rander Cities, Urban	1937	1939		1937		All-India Muslim League
2		A. A. Khan		1946	1947		1946		All-India Muslim League
Post-Independence Bombay Legislative Assembly (1947–60)
(2)		A. A. Khan		1947	1952		1946		Indian Union Muslim League
3		Tulsidas Jadhav	Barsi Madha	1952	1955		1st (1952)		Peasants and Workers Party of India
4		Shreedhar Joshi	Shukrawar Peth	1958	1959		2nd (1957)		Praja Socialist Party
5		Udhavrao Patil	Osmanabad	1958	1959		2nd (1957)		Peasants and Workers Party of India
6		Vithalrao Deshpande	Nanded	1959	1960		2nd (1957)		Communist Party of India
Maharashtra Legislative Assembly (since 1960)
1		Ramchandra Bhandare	Worli	1960	1962		1st (1957)		Scheduled Castes Federation
2		Krishnarao Dhulap	Kalyan	1962	1972		2nd (1962)		Peasants and Workers Party of India
2		Krishnarao Dhulap	Kalyan	1962	1972		3rd (1967)		Peasants and Workers Party of India
3		Dinkar Balu Patil	Panvel	4 April 1972	July 1977		4th (1972)		Peasants and Workers Party of India
4		Ganpatrao Deshmukh	Sangola	18 July 1977	February 1978		4th (1972)		Peasants and Workers Party of India
5		Uttamrao Patil	Parola	28 March 1978	17 July 1978	111 days	5th (1978)		Janata Party
6		Prabha Rau	Pulgaon	February 1979	13 July 1979		5th (1978)		Indian National Congress
7		Pratibha Patil	Muktainagar	16 July 1979	February 1980		5th (1978)		Indian National Congress
8		Sharad Pawar	Baramati	3 July 1980	1 August 1981	1 year, 29 days	6th (1980)		Indian Congress (Socialist)
9		Babanrao Dhakne	Pathardi	17 December 1981	24 December 1982	1 year, 7 days	6th (1980)		Janata Party
10		Dinkar Balu Patil	Panvel	24 December 1982	14 December 1983	355 days	6th (1980)		Peasants and Workers Party of India
(8)		Sharad Pawar	Baramati	15 December 1983	13 January 1985	2 years, 364 days	6th (1980)		Indian Congress (Socialist)
(8)		Sharad Pawar	Baramati	21 March 1985	14 December 1986	2 years, 364 days	7th (1985)		Indian Congress (Socialist)
11		Nihal Ahmed	Malegaon	14 December 1986	26 November 1987	347 days	7th (1985)		Janata Party
12		Datta Narayan Patil	Panvel	27 November 1987	22 December 1988	1 year, 25 days	7th (1985)		Peasants and Workers Party of India
13		Mrinal Gore	Goregaon	23 December 1988	19 October 1989	300 days	7th (1985)		Janata Party
(12)		Datta Narayan Patil	Panvel	20 October 1989	3 March 1990	134 days	7th (1985)		Peasants and Workers Party of India
13		Manohar Joshi	Dadar	22 March 1990	12 December 1991	1 year, 265 days	8th (1990)		Shiv Sena
14		Gopinath Munde	Renapur	12 December 1991	14 March 1995	3 years, 92 days	8th (1990)		Bharatiya Janata Party
15		Madhukar Pichad	Akole	25 March 1995	15 July 1999	4 years, 112 days	9th (1995)		Indian National Congress
16		Narayan Rane	Malvan	22 October 1999	12 July 2005	5 years, 263 days	10th (1999)		Shiv Sena
17		Ramdas Kadam	Khed	1 October 2005	3 November 2009	4 years, 33 days	11th (2004)		Shiv Sena
18		Eknath Khadse	Muktainagar	11 November 2009	8 November 2014	4 years, 362 days	12th (2009)	Ashok Chavan Prithviraj Chavan	Bharatiya Janata Party
19		Eknath Shinde	Kopri-Pachpakhadi	12 November 2014	5 December 2014	23 days	13th (2014)	Devendra Fadnavis	Shiv Sena
20		Radhakrishna Vikhe Patil	Shirdi	23 December 2014	4 June 2019	4 years, 163 days	13th (2014)	Devendra Fadnavis	Indian National Congress
21		Vijay Wadettiwar	Bramhapuri	24 June 2019	9 November 2019	138 days	13th (2014)	Devendra Fadnavis	Indian National Congress
22		Devendra Fadnavis	Nagpur South West	1 December 2019	29 June 2022	2 years, 210 days	14th (2019)	Uddhav Thackeray	Bharatiya Janata Party
23		Ajit Pawar	Baramati	4 July 2022	2 July 2023	363 days	14th (2019)	Eknath Shinde	Nationalist Congress Party
(21)		Vijay Wadettiwar	Bramhapuri	3 August 2023	26 November 2024	1 year, 115 days	14th (2019)	Eknath Shinde	Indian National Congress
–	Vacant			26 November 2024	Incumbent	1 year, 285 days	15th (2024)	Devendra Fadnavis	N.A

== Leaders of the Opposition (Additional Charge and Acting) ==
#	Portrait	Name	Tenure			Assembly (election)	Chief Minister	Party
Acting		Dilip Walse-Patil	23 November 2019	26 November 2019	3 days	14th (2019)	Devendra Fadnavis	Nationalist Congress Party
Acting		Jitendra Awhad	2 July 2023	18 July 2023	16 days	14th (2019)	Eknath Shinde	Nationalist Congress Party
Additional Charge		Balasaheb Thorat	18 July 2023	3 August 2023	16 days	14th (2019)	Eknath Shinde	Indian National Congress

== Deputy leaders of the Opposition ==
№	Portrait	Name	Term of office			Speaker of the House	Party
01		Jayant Patil	23 December 2014	20 April 2018	3 years, 118 days	Haribhau Bagade	Nationalist Congress Party
02		Shashikant Shinde	20 April 2018	9 November 2019	1 year, 203 days	Haribhau Bagade	Nationalist Congress Party
03		Sudhir Mungantiwar	2 December 2019	29 June 2022	2 years, 209 days	Nana Patole; Zirwal Narhari Sitaram (Acting)	Bharatiya Janata Party
04		Balasaheb Thorat	4 July 2022	3 August 2023	1 year, 30 days	Zirwal Narhari Sitaram (Acting); Rahul Narwekar	Indian National Congress
05 (First)		Jitendra Awhad	3 August 2023	26 November 2024	1 year, 115 days	Rahul Narwekar	Nationalist Congress Party - Sharadchandra Pawar
06 (Second)		Ajay Choudhari	3 August 2023	26 November 2024	1 year, 115 days	Rahul Narwekar	Shiv Sena (Uddhav Balasaheb Thackeray)

== See also ==
- List of governors of Maharashtra
- List of chief ministers of Maharashtra
- List of deputy chief ministers of Maharashtra
- List of chairmen of the Maharashtra Legislative Council
- List of speakers of the Maharashtra Legislative Assembly
- List of deputy speakers of the Maharashtra Legislative Assembly
- List of leaders of the house in the Maharashtra Legislative Assembly
- List of leaders of the house in the Maharashtra Legislative Council
- List of leaders of the opposition in the Maharashtra Legislative Council
