= Yogesh Kadam =

Indian politician

Yogesh Ramdas Kadam

Minister of State Government of Maharashtra
- Incumbent
- Assumed office 15 December 2024
- Governor: C. P. Radhakrishnan
- Cabinet: Third Fadnavis ministry
- Chief Minister: Devendra Fadnavis
- Deputy CM: Eknath Shinde; Ajit Pawar (till his demise in 2026) Sunetra Pawar (from 2026)
- Guardian Minister: NA

Member of the Maharashtra Legislative Assembly
- Incumbent
- Assumed office October 2019
- Preceded by: Sanjay vasant kadam
- Constituency: Dapoli

Personal details
- Born: 18 Feb
- Party: Shiv Sena
- Children: 1
- Parent: Ramdas Kadam (father)

Yogesh Ramdas Kadam is an Indian politician serving as Member of the Maharashtra Legislative Assembly from Dapoli Vidhan Sabha constituency as a member of Shiv Sena, elected first in 2019 when Shiv Sena was undivided, and re-elected in 2024 as a member of Eknath Shinde's Shiv Sena.

== Positions held ==
- 2019: Elected to Maharashtra Legislative Assembly
