= Balasaheb Bharde =

Indian politician

- Born: 1912; Shevgaon, Ahmednagar district, Maharashtra, India
- Died: 22 November 2006 (aged 93–94); Pune, Maharashtra, India
- Occupations: Indian social workers Politician; Independent activist
- Known for: Cooperative movement Social service
- Children: Five sons and a daughter
- Awards: Padma Bhushan (2001)

Balasaheb Shivram Bharde (1912–2006), also known as Trimbak, was an Indian independence activist, social worker, educationist and the speaker of Maharashtra Legislative Assembly. He was known for his contributions to the cooperative movement in Maharashtra as the Minister of Co-operation (1957–1962). He was associated with several social and government organizations such as Khadi Gramodhyog, Harijan Sevak Sangh and Maharashtra Gandhi Smarak Nidhi (MGSN) and served as the chairman of the first named and as the second president of the MGS Nidhi. He also chaired the Maharashtra State Khadi Board.

Born in 1912 at Shevgaon, a small village in Ahmednagar district of the Indian state of Maharashtra, he represented his native constituency at the State Legislative Assembly for two decades from 1952. The Government of India awarded him the third highest civilian honour of the Padma Bhushan, in 2001, for his contributions to society. He died on 22 November 2006 at the age of 94, in Pune. He had a wife, five sons and a daughter. Several educational institutions and a public library in Shevgaon have been named after Bharde.

== See also ==
- Cooperative movement in India
- Maharashtra Legislative Assembly
