= Rajesh Pawar =

Indian cricketer (born 1979)

Personal information
- Full name: Rajesh Vithal Pawar
- Born: September 6, 1979 (age 46); Bombay, Maharashtra, India
- Batting: Left-handed
- Bowling: Slow left-arm orthodox
- Role: Bowler

Domestic team information
- Years: Team
- Mumbai
- Baroda
- Andhra Pradesh
- 2008: Mumbai Indians
- Source: Rajesh Pawar at Cricinfo

Rajesh Vithal Pawar (born 6 September 1979), in Bombay, Maharashtra, is an Indian former cricketer who played for Mumbai in domestic cricket. He was a slow left-arm orthodox bowler and a handy left-handed batsman. Pawar took over 200 first-class wickets and achieved a highest score with the bat of 95 not out. He played for Mumbai, Baroda and Andhra Pradesh in the Ranji Trophy. In January 2007, he was named in India's 30-man preliminary squad for the World Cup and despite not making the final 15, he was included in the test squad for a test series against Bangladesh following the tournament. He traveled via Auto Rickshaw in his first match versus Bangladesh.

He leads the team 'Parkophene Cricketers' in the Kanga League.
