= Ramdas Kadam =

Indian politician

Minister of Environment Government of Maharashtra
- In office 4 December 2014 – 12 November 2019
- Chief Minister: Devendra Fadnavis
- Succeeded by: Aaditya Thackeray

Member of Maharashtra Legislative Council
- In office 2 January 2010 – 1 January 2022
- Succeeded by: Sunil Shinde
- Constituency: Mumbai Local Authorities

17th Leader of Opposition Maharashtra Legislative Assembly
- In office 1 October 2005 – 3 November 2009
- Chief Minister: Vilasrao Deshmukh; Ashok Chavan
- Preceded by: Narayan Rane
- Succeeded by: Eknath Khadse

Member of Maharashtra Legislative Assembly
- In office 1990–2009
- Preceded by: Tukaram Kadam
- Succeeded by: constituency defunct
- Constituency: Khed

Personal details
- Born: 27 July 1953 (age 73) Ratnagiri, Bombay State, India
- Party: Shiv Sena
- Other political affiliations: Shivsena
- Children: Siddhesh Kadam; Yogesh Kadam; Yogita Kadam Kapdi
- Occupation: Politician

Ramdas Gangaram Kadam (born 23 July 1953) is an Indian politician from Maharashtra. He was a Member of the Legislative Assembly from Khed Vidhan Sabha constituency of Ratnagiri District, Maharashtra, India as a member of Shiv Sena. He has been elected consecutively for 4 terms in the Maharashtra Legislative Assembly for 1990, 1995, 1999 and 2004. He got elected to the Maharashtra Legislative Council from Shiv Sena Party in January 2010. He was Cabinet Minister of Environment in the Maharashtra State Government and guardian minister of Nanded district.

His son Yogesh Kadam was elected to Maharashtra Vidhan Sabha in 2024 as a member of Shiv Sena, led by Eknath Shinde.

== Positions held ==
- 1990: Elected to Maharashtra Legislative Assembly (1st term)
- 1995: Re-Elected to Maharashtra Legislative Assembly (2nd term)
- 1999: Re-Elected to Maharashtra Legislative Assembly (3rd term)
- 2004: Re-Elected to Maharashtra Legislative Assembly (4th term)
- 2005-2009: Leader of the Opposition in the Maharashtra Legislative Assembly
- 2005 Onwards: Leader, Shiv Sena
- 2010: Elected to Maharashtra Legislative Council (1st term)
- 2014: Cabinet Minister of Environment (Marathi: पर्यावरण) in Maharashtra State Government
- 2014-2018: Guardian minister of Aurangabad
- 2015: Re-elected to Maharashtra Legislative Council (2nd term)
- 2014-2018: Appointed Guardian minister of Nanded district

== See also ==
- Narayan Rane ministry
- Devendra Fadnavis ministry
- Yogesh Kadam

Political offices
Preceded by Ganesh Naik	Cabinet Minister for Environment, Maharashtra State; December 2014–present	Incumbent
Preceded by	Guardian Minister for Aurangabad district, Maharashtra; December 2014–present	Incumbent
