= Democratic Front (India) =

Maha Aghadi
- महा आघाडी Democratic Front
- Abbreviation: DF, MA
- Chairperson: Sharad Pawar
- Founder: Vilasrao Deshmukh
- Founded: 1999
- Dissolved: 2019
- Merged into: MVA
- Ideology: Big tent Factions: Secularism; Socialism; Progressivism; Liberalism; Nationalism
- Political position: Center
- ECI status: State Alliance
- Alliance: UPA

Democratic Front or Maha Aghadi was name of former governing coalition in the Indian state of Maharashtra. The Alliance of Indian National Congress and Nationalist Congress Party was called as Maha Aghadi.

== Background ==
The alliance was created post 1999 Maharashtra Assembly Poll results as Congress and NCP contested against each other without a pre-poll alliance but came together to stake claim to form the government. The alliance constituted the Indian National Congress and Nationalist Congress Party. The alliance won the Maharashtra Vidhan Sabha Elections of 1999, 2004, 2009 respectively.

== Electoral performance ==
Year	INC	NCP	IND/OTH	Seats Won	Seat Change
1999	75	58	15	148 / 288 (51%)	▲148
2004	69	71	12	152 / 288 (53%)	▲4
2009	82	62	31	175 / 288 (61%)	▲12
2014	42	41	-	83 / 288 (29%)	▼92
2019	44	54	-	98 / 288 (34%)	▲15
