= Wadala Assembly constituency =

Constituency of the Maharashtra legislative assembly in India

Coordinates: 19.014°N 72.858°E

Wadala
- Constituency No. 180 for the Maharashtra Legislative Assembly

Constituency details
- Country: India
- Region: Western India
- State: Maharashtra
- District: Mumbai City
- Lok Sabha constituency: Mumbai South Central
- Established: 2008
- Total electors: 205,429
- Reservation: None

Member of Legislative Assembly
- 15th Maharashtra Legislative Assembly
- Incumbent Kalidas Kolambkar
- Party: Bharatiya Janata Party
- Elected year: 2024

Wadala Assembly constituency is one of the ten constituencies of the Maharashtra Legislative Assembly located in Mumbai City district.

== Overview ==
It is a part of Mumbai South Central Lok Sabha constituency along with five other assembly constituencies, viz Dharavi, Sion Koliwada, Mahim, from Mumbai City district and Chembur and Anushakti Nagar from Mumbai Suburban district.

== Members of the Legislative Assembly ==
Year	Member	Party
1951-2008: Constituency did not exist
2009	Kalidas Kolambkar	Indian National Congress
2014	Kalidas Kolambkar	Indian National Congress
2019	Kalidas Kolambkar	Bharatiya Janata Party
2024	Kalidas Kolambkar	Bharatiya Janata Party

== Election results ==
=== Assembly Election 2024 ===
2024 Maharashtra Legislative Assembly election : Wadala
Party	Candidate	Votes	%	±%
BJP	Kalidas Nilkanth Kolambkar	66,800	56.59%	▲2.88
SS(UBT)	Shraddha Jadhav	41,827	35.43%	New
MNS	Snehal Sudhir Jadhav	6,972	5.91%	▼9.10
NOTA	None of the Above	1,708	1.45%	▼1.82
Republican Sena	Manoj Mohan Gaikwad	1,407	1.19%	New
Margin of victory		24,973	21.15%	▼8.17
Turnout		119,756	58.30%	▲4.97
Total valid votes		118,048		
Registered electors		205,429		▲0.81
BJP hold		Swing	▲2.88	

=== Assembly Election 2019 ===
2019 Maharashtra Legislative Assembly election : Wadala
Party	Candidate	Votes	%	±%
BJP	Kalidas Nilkanth Kolambkar	56,485	53.71%	▲22.06
INC	Shivkumar Uday Lad	25,640	24.38%	▼7.94
MNS	Anand Mohan Prabhu	15,779	15.00%	▲9.79
Independent	Laxman Kashinath Pawar	6,544	6.22%	New
NOTA	None of the Above	3,432	3.26%	▲1.90
Margin of victory		30,845	29.33%	▲28.66
Turnout		108,664	53.33%	▼7.22
Total valid votes		105,168		
Registered electors		203,776		▲3.47
BJP gain from INC		Swing	▲21.39	

=== Assembly Election 2014 ===
2014 Maharashtra Legislative Assembly election : Wadala
Party	Candidate	Votes	%	±%
INC	Kalidas Nilkanth Kolambkar	38,540	32.32%	▼17.38
BJP	Mihir Kotecha	37,740	31.65%	New
SS	Doke Hemant Umaji	32,080	26.90%	▲3.95
MNS	Anand Prabhu	6,223	5.22%	▼16.18
NOTA	None of the Above	1,624	1.36%	New
NCP	Appa Alias Pramod Shivaji Patil	1,496	1.25%	New
BSP	Santosh Gajanan Tambe	1,159	0.97%	▼0.24
Republican Sena	Manoj Mohan Gaikwad	865	0.73%	New
Margin of victory		800	0.67%	▼26.08
Turnout		120,911	61.39%	▲14.28
Total valid votes		119,254		
Registered electors		196,951		▼18.83
INC hold		Swing	▼17.38	

=== Assembly Election 2009 ===
2009 Maharashtra Legislative Assembly election : Wadala
Party	Candidate	Votes	%	±%
INC	Kalidas Nilkanth Kolambkar	55,795	49.70%	New
SS	Digambar Dattaram Kandarkar	25,765	22.95%	New
MNS	Pramod Shivaji Patil	24,022	21.40%	New
RPI(A)	Sachinbhai Dayanand Mohite	3,272	2.91%	New
BSP	Kale Silvin Yohan	1,362	1.21%	New
Margin of victory		30,030	26.75%	
Turnout		112,272	46.27%	
Total valid votes		112,270		
Registered electors		242,626		
INC win (new seat)				

== See also ==
List of constituencies of Maharashtra Legislative Assembly
