= Kalidas Kolambkar =

Indian politician

Member of Maharashtra Legislative Assembly
- Incumbent
- Assumed office 2009
- Preceded by: Constituency Established
- Constituency: Wadala
- In office 1990–2009
- Succeeded by: Abolished
- Constituency: Naigaon Assembly constituency (Mumbai Region)

Personal details
- Party: Bharatiya Janata Party
- Other political affiliations: Indian National Congress; Shiv Sena
- Occupation: Politician

Kalidas Nilkanth Kolambkar is an Indian politician from Maharashtra. He is an eight-term Member of the Maharashtra Legislative Assembly.

Kolambkar was elected from Naigaon (Former Vidhan Sabha constituency) as a Shiv Sena candidate in 2004. He then joined the Indian National Congress and was elected from Wadala (Vidhan Sabha constituency), Mumbai, Maharashtra to the Legislative Assembly in 2009 and 2014. Later he joined the Bharatiya Janata Party and was elected to the Legislative Assembly in 2019 from Wadala. He was also elected as Pro tem Speaker of 14th Maharashtra Assembly & 15th Maharashtra Assembly. Currently he is one of the most senior MLAs in Maharashtra.
