= Ballarpur Assembly constituency =

Constituency of the Maharashtra legislative assembly in India

Coordinates: 19.85°N 79.36°E

Ballarpur
- Constituency No. 72 for the Maharashtra Legislative Assembly
- Sudhir Mungantiwar, present MLA of Chandrapur

Constituency details
- Country: India
- Region: Western India
- State: Maharashtra
- District: Chandrapur
- Lok Sabha constituency: Chandrapur
- Established: 2008
- Total electors: 312,705
- Reservation: None

Member of Legislative Assembly
- 15th Maharashtra Legislative Assembly
- Incumbent Sudhir Mungantiwar
- Party: BJP
- Alliance: NDA
- Elected year: 2024

Ballarpur Assembly constituency is one of the 288 Vidhan Sabha (legislative assembly) constituencies of Maharashtra state, western India. This constituency is located in Chandrapur district. The delimitation of the constituency happened in 2008.

In the Vidarbha zone, Assembly number 72 is named Ballarpur Assembly constituency comes.

== Geographical scope ==
The constituency comprises Mul taluka, Pombhurna taluka, Ballarpur taluka, and parts of Chandrapur taluka viz. revenue circles - Chandrapur, Chandrapur Rayatwari & Padmapur.

== Members of the Legislative Assembly ==
Year	Member	Party
Until 2008: Constituency did not exist
2009	Sudhir Mungantiwar	Bharatiya Janata Party
2014	Sudhir Mungantiwar	Bharatiya Janata Party
2019	Sudhir Mungantiwar	Bharatiya Janata Party
2024	Sudhir Mungantiwar	Bharatiya Janata Party

== Election results ==
=== Assembly Election 2024 ===
2024 Maharashtra Legislative Assembly election : Ballarpur
Party	Candidate	Votes	%	±%
BJP	Sudhir Mungantiwar	105,969	48.39	▲5.09
INC	Rawat Santoshsingh Chandansingh	79,984	36.53	▲9.96
Independent	Dr. Abhilasha Gaoture (Behere)	20,935	9.56	New
VBA	Malekar Satish Murlidhar	5,075	2.32	▼17.80
NOTA	None of the Above	728	0.33	▼0.60
Margin of victory		25,985	11.87	▼4.87
Turnout		2,19,702	70.26	▲8.17
Total valid votes		2,18,974		
Registered electors		3,12,705		▼2.61
BJP hold		Swing	▲5.09	

=== Assembly Election 2019 ===
2019 Maharashtra Legislative Assembly election : Ballarpur
Party	Candidate	Votes	%	±%
BJP	Sudhir Mungantiwar	86,002	43.30	▼10.10
INC	Dr. Vishwas Anandrao Zade	52,762	26.57	▼4.39
VBA	Zode Raju Chinnayya	39,958	20.12	New
GGP	Manoj Dharma Atram	13,925	7.01	▲3.49
NOTA	None of the Above	1,853	0.93	▲0.22
BSP	Sarfaraj Yusuf Sheikh	1,381	0.70	▼4.63
Margin of victory		33,240	16.74	▼5.71
Turnout		2,00,789	62.53	▼1.31
Total valid votes		1,98,607		
Registered electors		3,21,083		▲4.43
BJP hold		Swing	▼10.10	

=== Assembly Election 2014 ===
2014 Maharashtra Legislative Assembly election : Ballarpur
Party	Candidate	Votes	%	±%
BJP	Sudhir Mungantiwar	103,718	53.40	▲3.66
INC	Mulchandani Ghanshyam Khushimal	60,118	30.95	▼4.51
BSP	Singh Rajesh Durgasingh	10,344	5.33	▼0.59
GGP	Manoj Dharma Atram	6,838	3.52	New
SS	Keshavrao Beniram Katre	2,555	1.32	New
MNS	Adv. Harshal Kumar Chiplunkar	1,964	1.01	New
NCP	Waman Dauji Zhade	1,867	0.96	New
NOTA	None of the Above	1,383	0.71	New
Margin of victory		43,600	22.45	▲8.17
Turnout		1,95,656	63.64	▲2.04
Total valid votes		1,94,218		
Registered electors		3,07,463		▲8.47
BJP hold		Swing	▲3.66	

=== Assembly Election 2009 ===
2009 Maharashtra Legislative Assembly election : Ballarpur
Party	Candidate	Votes	%	±%
BJP	Sudhir Mungantiwar	86,196	49.74	New
INC	Pugliya Rahul Naresh	61,460	35.47	New
Independent	Vinod Gajanan Ahirkar	10,921	6.30	New
BSP	Dr. Poddar Amal Satish	10,245	5.91	New
Independent	Thulkar Bharat Somaji	1,701	0.98	New
RPI(A)	Deodatta Hansraj Ramteke	1,580	0.91	New
Margin of victory		24,736	14.28	
Turnout		1,73,286	61.13	
Total valid votes		1,73,279		
Registered electors		2,83,450		
BJP win (new seat)				
