= List of deputy chief ministers of Maharashtra =

Deputy Chief Minister of Maharashtra
- Seal of Maharashtra

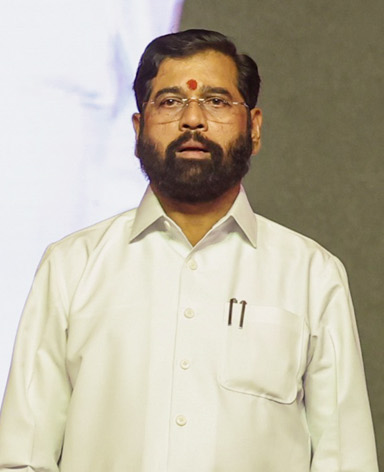
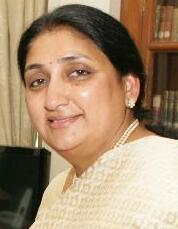
- Incumbent; Eknath Shinde and Sunetra Pawar since 5 December 2024 and 31 January 2026
- Deputy Chief Minister's Office (Maharashtra)
- Style: The Honourable
- Type: Deputy Chief Minister
- Status: Deputy Head of Government
- Abbreviation: DCM
- Member of: Maharashtra Legislative Council; Maharashtra Legislative Assembly; Cabinet
- Seat: Mantralaya, Mumbai
- Nominator: Chief Minister of Maharashtra
- Appointer: Governor of Maharashtra
- Term length: At the confidence of the assembly; 5 years and is subject to no term limits.
- Inaugural holder: Nasikrao Tirpude (March 1978 – July 1978)
- Formation: 5 March 1978 (48 years ago)

The deputy chief minister of Maharashtra is the deputy head of the executive branch of the Government of Maharashtra and the second highest ranking minister of the Council of Ministers.The position of deputy chief minister is not explicitly defined or mentioned in the Constitution of India. However, the Supreme Court of India has stated that the appointment of deputy chief ministers is not unconstitutional. The court has clarified that a deputy chief minister, for all practical purposes, remains a minister in the council of ministers headed by the chief minister and does not draw a higher salary or perks compared to other ministers.During the absence of the chief minister, the deputy-chief minister may chair cabinet meetings and lead the assembly majority. Various deputy chief ministers have also taken the oath of secrecy in line with the one that chief minister takes. This oath has also sparked controversies.

== List of deputy chief ministers ==
Key

- No.: Incumbent number
- ^{†} Died in office
- ^{§} Returned to office after a previous non-consecutive term
- ^{RES} Resigned

#	Portrait	Name	Constituency	Term of office			Assembly (election)	Chief Minister	Party
1		Nashikrao Tirpude	Bhandara	5 March 1978	18 July 1978	135 days	5th (1978)	Vasantdada Patil	Indian National Congress
2		Sundarrao Solanke	Majalgaon	18 July 1978	17 February 1980	1 year, 214 days	5th (1978)	Sharad Pawar	Indian Congress (Socialist)
3		Ramrao Adik	MLC	2 February 1983	5 March 1985	2 years, 31 days	6th (1980)	Vasantdada Patil	Indian National Congress
4		Gopinath Munde	Renapur	14 March 1995	18 October 1999	4 years, 218 days	9th (1995)	Manohar Joshi Narayan Rane	Bharatiya Janata Party
5		Chhagan Bhujbal	MLC	18 October 1999	23 December 2003	4 years, 66 days	10th (1999)	Vilasrao Deshmukh Sushilkumar Shinde	Nationalist Congress Party
6		Vijaysinh Mohite–Patil	Malshiras	25 December 2003	1 November 2004	312 days	10th (1999)	Sushilkumar Shinde	Nationalist Congress Party
7		R. R. Patil	Tasgaon-Kavathe Mahankal	1 November 2004	8 December 2008	4 years, 37 days	11th (2004)	Vilasrao Deshmukh	Nationalist Congress Party
(5)		Chhagan Bhujbal	Yevla	8 December 2008	7 November 2009	1 year, 338 days	11th (2004)	Ashok Chavan	Nationalist Congress Party
(5)		Chhagan Bhujbal	Yevla	7 November 2009	11 November 2010	1 year, 338 days	12th (2009)	Ashok Chavan	Nationalist Congress Party
8		Ajit Pawar	Baramati	11 November 2010	25 September 2012^{[RES]}	1 year, 319 days	12th (2009)	Prithviraj Chavan	Nationalist Congress Party
8		Ajit Pawar	Baramati	7 December 2012	26 September 2014	1 year, 295 days	12th (2009)	Prithviraj Chavan	Nationalist Congress Party
8		Ajit Pawar	Baramati	23 November 2019	26 November 2019^{[RES]}	5 days	14th (2019)	Devendra Fadnavis	Nationalist Congress Party
8		Ajit Pawar	Baramati	30 December 2019	30 June 2022	2 years, 181 days	14th (2019)	Uddhav Thackeray	Nationalist Congress Party
9		Devendra Fadnavis	Nagpur South West	30 June 2022	26 November 2024	2 years, 150 days	14th (2019)	Eknath Shinde	Bharatiya Janata Party
(8)		Ajit Pawar	Baramati	2 July 2023	26 November 2024	2 years, 201 days	14th (2019)	Eknath Shinde	Nationalist Congress Party
(8)		Ajit Pawar	Baramati	5 December 2024	28 January 2026^{[†]}	2 years, 201 days	15th (2024)	Devendra Fadnavis	Nationalist Congress Party
10		Eknath Shinde	Kopri-Pachpakhadi	5 December 2024	Incumbent	1 year, 323 days	15th (2024)	Devendra Fadnavis	Shiv Sena
11	94x94	Sunetra Pawar	Baramati	31 January 2026	Incumbent	266 days	15th (2024)	Devendra Fadnavis	Nationalist Congress Party

== Statistics ==
=== List by deputy chief minister ===
Time held in office by party since the creation of the Deputy Chief Minister's post in Maharashtra. (Note: This pie chart represents the distribution of time the office of Deputy Chief Minister of Maharashtra has been held by each party since the position was first created on 5 March 1978, including periods when the office was vacant or not in use.)
1. Nationalist Congress Party (pre–2023) (33.7%)
2. Nationalist Congress Party (5.65%)
3. Bharatiya Janata Party (13.7%)
4. Indian National Congress (4.80%)
5. Indian Congress (Socialist) (3.10%)
6. Shiv Sena (2.92%)
7. Position not in use (36.1%)

#	Deputy Chief Minister	Party	Term of office	
#	Deputy Chief Minister	Party	Longest term	Total duration
1	Ajit Pawar^{†}	NCP	2 years, 210 days	8 years, 202 days
2	Chhagan Bhujbal	NCP	4 years, 66 days	6 years, 39 days
3	R. R. Patil	NCP	4 years, 37 days	4 years, 37 days
4	Gopinath Munde	BJP	4 years, 218 days	4 years, 218 days
5	Devendra Fadnavis	BJP	2 years, 149 days	2 years, 149 days
6	Ramrao Adik	INC	2 years, 31 days	2 years, 31 days
8	Eknath Shinde	SHS	1 year, 323 days	1 year, 323 days
7	Sundarrao Solanke	IC(S)	1 year, 214 days	1 year, 214 days
9	Vijaysinh Mohite–Patil	NCP	312 days	312 days
10	Sunetra Pawar	NCP	266 days	266 days
11	Nasikrao Tirpude	INC	135 days	135 days

== See also ==
- List of governors of Maharashtra
- List of chief ministers of Maharashtra
- List of chairpersons of the Maharashtra Legislative Council
- List of speakers of the Maharashtra Legislative Assembly
- List of deputy speakers of the Maharashtra Legislative Assembly
- List of leaders of the house in the Maharashtra Legislative Assembly
- List of leaders of the house in the Maharashtra Legislative Council
- List of deputy leaders of the house in the Maharashtra Legislative Assembly
- List of leaders of the opposition in the Maharashtra Legislative Assembly
- List of leaders of the opposition in the Maharashtra Legislative Council
- Chief minister (India)
