= 2024 Maharashtra Legislative Assembly election =

- 20 November 2024

All 288 members of the Maharashtra Legislative Assembly 145 seats needed for a majority
- Opinion polls
- Turnout: 66.57% (▲5.13 pp)
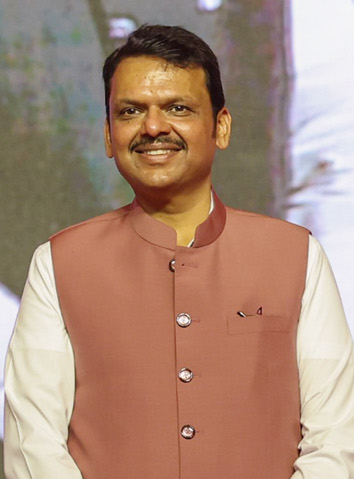

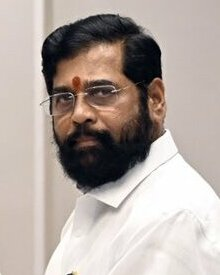

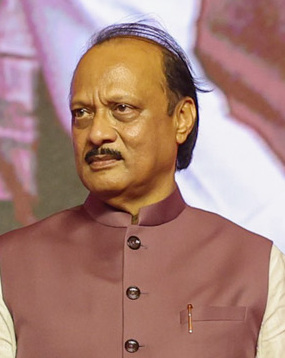

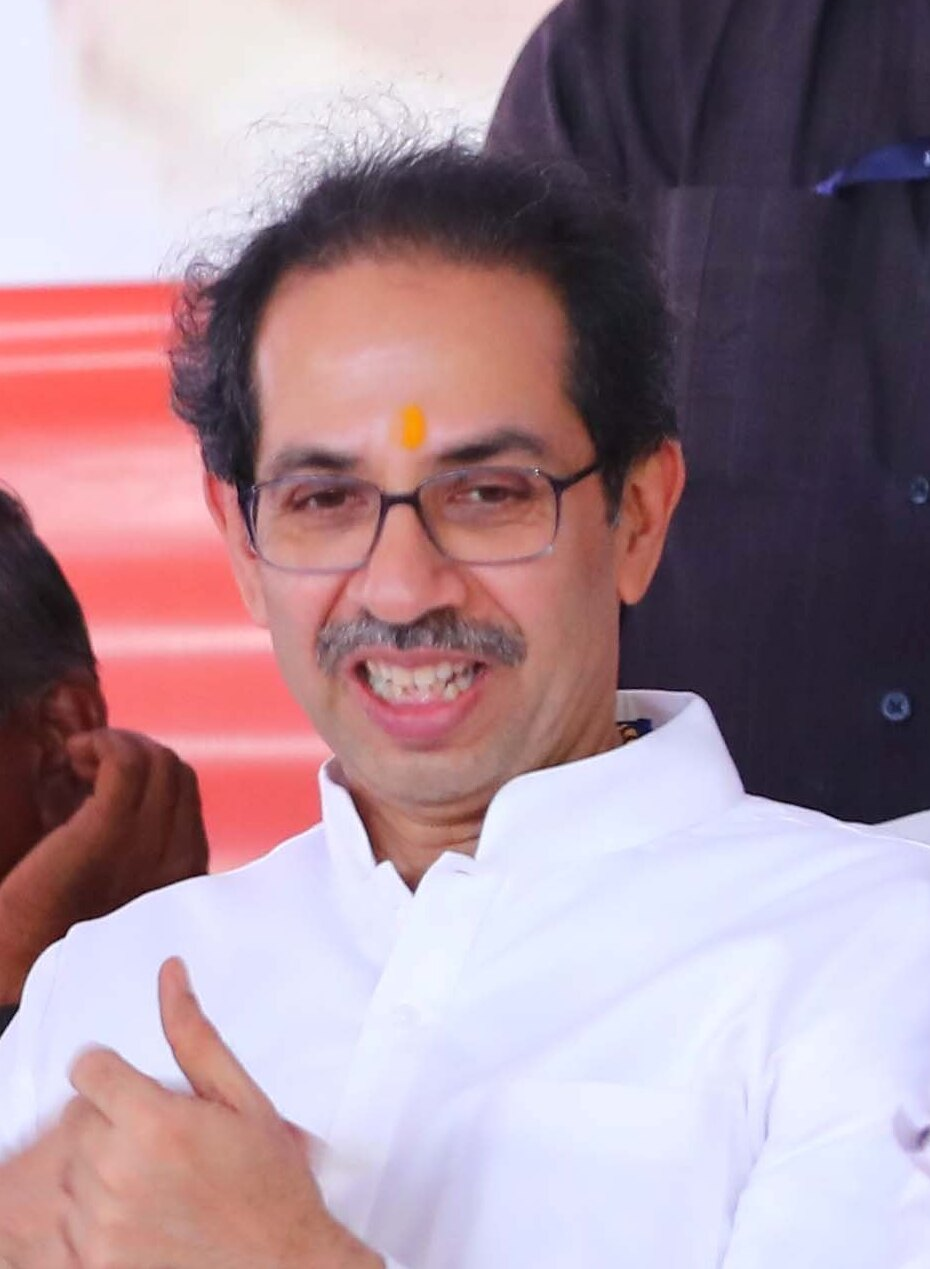

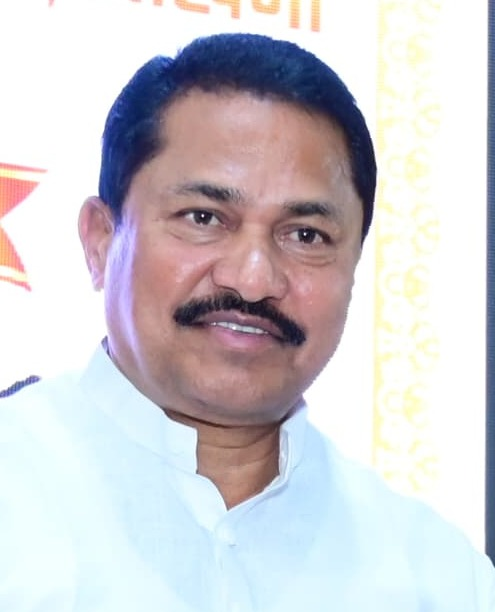

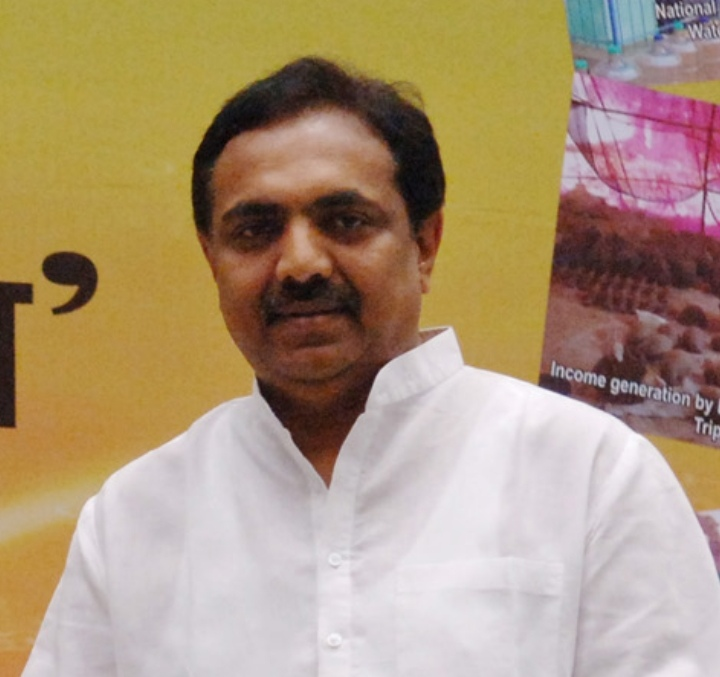
	Majority party	Minority party	Third party
Leader	Devendra Fadnavis	Eknath Shinde	Ajit Pawar
Party	BJP	Shiv Sena (Eknath Shinde)	NCP
Alliance	MY	MY	MY
Leader since	2013	2023	2022
Leader's seat	Nagpur South-West	Kopri-Pachpakhadi	Baramati
Last election	25.75%, 105 seats	Party split after last election	Party split after last election
Seats before	102	40	40
Seats won	132	57	41
Seat change	▲27	▲17 (Note: Seat change from the MLAs who supported Ekhnath Shinde in the 2022 Maharashtra political crisis.)	▲1 (Note: Seat change from the MLAs who supported Ajit Pawar in the 2023 Maharashtra political crisis.)
Popular vote	17,293,650	7,996,930	5,816,566
Percentage	26.77%	12.38%	9.01%
Swing	▲1.02 pp	New (Note: Vote share after splint in 2022 Maharashtra political crisis.)	New (Note: Vote share after splint in 2023 Maharashtra political crisis.)
	Fourth party	Fifth party	Sixth party
Leader	Uddhav Thackeray	Nana Patole	Jayant Patil
Party	SS(UBT)	INC	NCP(SP)
Alliance	MVA	MVA	MVA
Leader since	2024	2023	2024
Leader's seat	MLC (did not contest)	Sakoli	Islampur
Last election	Party split after last election	15.87%, 44 seats	Party split after last election
Seats before	16	37	12
Seats won	20	16	10
Seat change	▲4 (Note: Seat change from the MLAs who supported Uddhav Thackeray in the 2022 Maharashtra political crisis.)	▼28	▼2 (Note: Seat change from the MLAs who supported Sharad Pawar in the 2023 Maharashtra political crisis.)
Popular vote	6,433,013	8,020,921	7,287,797
Percentage	9.96%	12.42%	11.28%
Swing	New	▼3.45 pp	New' (Note: Vote share after splint in 2023 Maharashtra political crisis.)

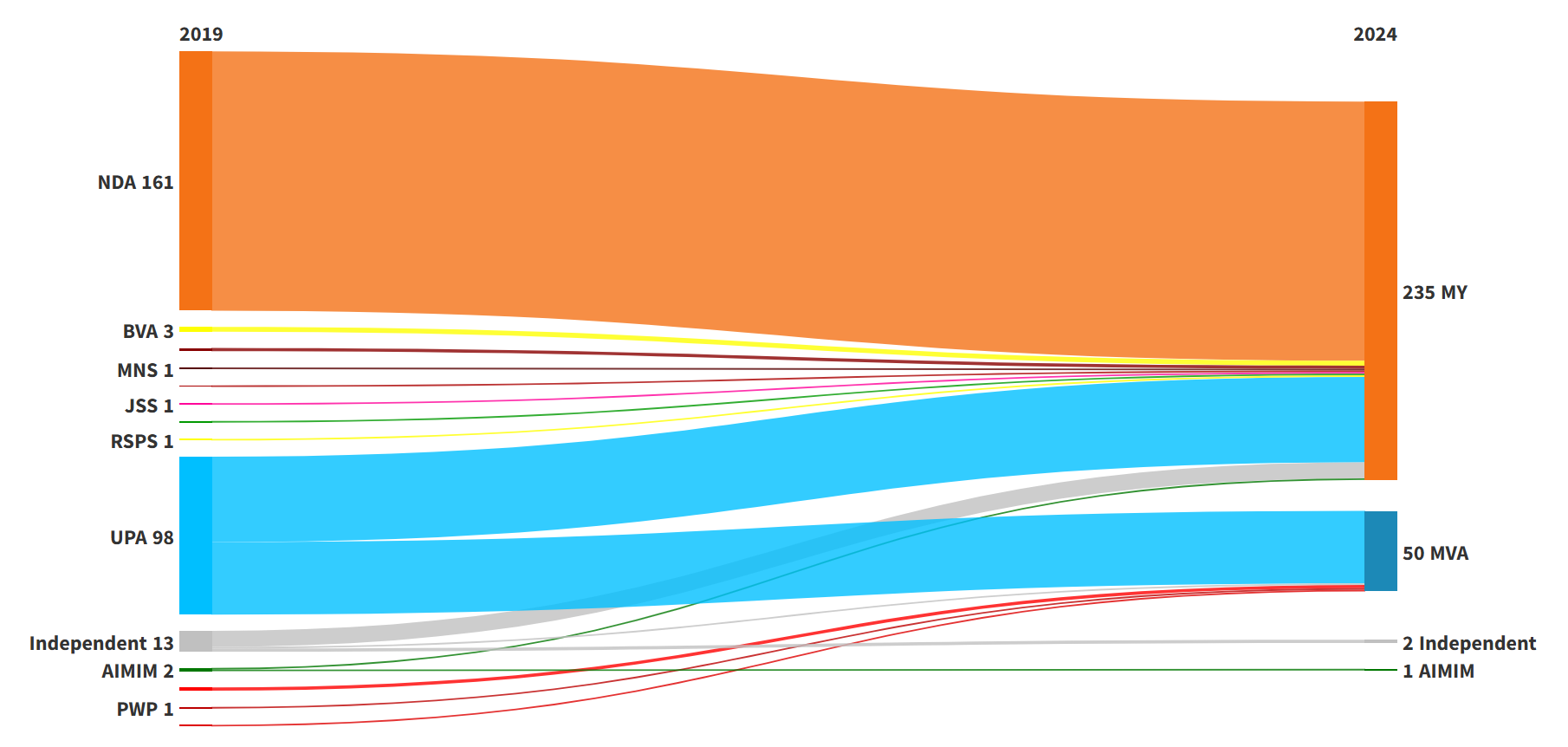
- Sankey Diagram of 2024 elections in comparision to 2019 elections
Chief Minister before election
Eknath Shinde
SHS
Maha Yuti
Chief Minister after election
Devendra Fadnavis
BJP
Maha Yuti

The 2024 Maharashtra legislative assembly elections were held On 20 November 2024 to elect all 288 members of the state's Legislative Assembly. The turnout for the election was 66.05%, the highest since 1995. The BJP-led Mahayuti alliance won a landslide victory, winning 235 seats of the 288 seats in which the election was held. None of the parties in the Maha Vikas Aghadi alliance won the necessary number of seats to obtain the position of Leader of the Opposition, a first in six decades.

Following the election, the BJP's leadership chose Devendra Fadnavis as their choice for chief minister On 4 December 2024. He took the oath as the chief minister for the third time on 5 December 2024.

== Background ==
The tenure of the Maharashtra Legislative Assembly was set to conclude on 26 November. The last Assembly elections in Maharashtra took place in October 2019. The BJP-led National Democratic Alliance secured a majority to establish the government. However, internal conflicts led the Shiv Sena to exit the alliance and join forces with the Nationalist Congress Party and the Indian National Congress, forming a new coalition called Maha Vikas Aghadi. Subsequently, Maha Vikas Aghadi established the state government, with Shiv Sena leader Uddhav Thackeray assuming the role of chief minister.

=== Political developments ===
Following the 2022 Shiv Sena split, Shiv Sena MLA Eknath Shinde, along with 40 MLAs from his party, formed a government with the BJP with Shinde becoming the new chief minister. After the 2023 Nationalist Congress Party split, the Ajit Pawar faction of Nationalist Congress Party also joined the government.

In the 2024 Lok Sabha elections in Maharashtra, which was the first major election after the split of the Nationalist Congress Party and Shiv Sena, Maha Vikas Aghadi won a record breaking 31 out of 48 seats while Mahayuti could only get 17 seats.

== Schedule ==
Poll event	Schedule
Notification date	22 October
Last date for filing nomination	29 October
Scrutiny of nomination	30 October
Last date for withdrawal of nomination	4 November
Date of poll	20 November
Date of Counting of Votes	23 November

== Parties and alliances ==
=== Maha Yuti ===
Maha Yuti

Party	Flag	Symbols	Leader	Seats contested
Bharatiya Janata Party			Devendra Fadnavis	145+4 (Note: Includes 1 NDA candidate under BJP symbol and friendly contest with NCP on 3 seats.)
Shiv Sena			Eknath Shinde	75+6 (Note: SHS had a friendly contest with RYSP and NCP on 1 and 5 seats respectively.)
Nationalist Congress Party			Ajit Pawar	50+9 (Note: NCP had a friendly contest with BJP and SHS on 3 and 5 seats respectively, and with JSS on 1 seat.)
Jan Surajya Shakti			Vinay Kore	2+4 (Note: JSS had a friendly contest with NCP on 1 seat.)
Rashtriya Samaj Paksha			Mahadev Jankar	1+92
Rashtriya Yuva Swabhiman Party			Ravi Rana	1+1 (Note: RYSP had a friendly contest with SHS on 1 seat)
Rajarshi Shahu Vikas Aghadi			Rajendra Patil Yadravkar	1
No Candidates				2 (Note: Supported MNS candidate on one seat.)

=== Maha Vikas Aghadi ===
Maha Vikas Aghadi

Party	Flag	Symbol	Leader	Seats contested
Indian National Congress			Balasaheb Thorat	100+1 (Note: Congress had a friendly contest with NCP-SP and CPI(M) on Pandharpur and Solapur City Central constituencies respectively.)
Shiv Sena (UBT)			Uddhav Thackeray	90+5 (Note: SS(UBT) had a friendly contest with PWPI on Panvel and Uran constituencies.)
Nationalist Congress Party – Sharadchandra Pawar			Sharad Pawar	85+1 (Note: NCP(SP) had a friendly contest with Congress on Pandharpur constituency.)
Samajwadi Party			Abu Azmi	2+7 (Note: SP contested 7 other seats independently.)
Peasants and Workers Party of India			Jayant Prabhakar Patil	3+15 (Note: PWPI had a friendly contest with SS(UBT) on Panvel and Uran constituencies.)
Communist Party of India (Marxist)			Ashok Dhawale; Uday Narkar	2+1 (Note: CPI(M) had a friendly contest with INC on Solapur City Central constituency.)
Communist Party of India			Budh Mala Pawara	1+1

=== Parivartan Mahashakti ===
Party	Flag	Symbol	Leader	Seats contested
Prahar Janshakti Party			Bachchu Kadu	38
Maharashtra Swarajya Party			Sambhaji Raje Chhatrapati	32
Swabhimani Paksha			Raju Shetty	19
Swatantra Bharat Paksh			Wamanrao Chatap	3
Maharashtra Rajya Samiti			Shankar Anna Dhondge	2

=== Others ===
Party	Flag	Symbol	Leader	Seats contested
All India Majlis-e-Ittehadul Muslimeen			Imtiyaz Jaleel	17
Aazad Samaj Party (Kanshi Ram)			Chandrashekhar Azad	28
Bahujan Samaj Party			Sunil Dongre	237
Bahujan Vikas Aaghadi			Hitendra Thakur	8
Maharashtra Navnirman Sena			Raj Thackeray	125
Vanchit Bahujan Aaghadi			Prakash Ambedkar	200
Viduthalai Chiruthaigal Katchi			Thol. Thirumavalavan	4

=== Alliance-wise Contest ===
Parties				
Parties	BJP	SHS	NCP	OTH
INC	74	13	7	7
SS(UBT)	33	51	5	7
NCP(SP)	36	8	37	5
Others	2	3	9	

== Candidates ==
=== Candidate List ===
District	Assembly Constituency					
District	Assembly Constituency		Maha Yuti		Maha Vikas Aghadi	
Nandurbar	1	Akkalkuwa (ST)	SHS	Aamshya Padavi	INC	Kagda Chandya Padvi
Nandurbar	2	Shahada (ST)	BJP	Rajesh Padvi	INC	Rajendrakumar Gavit
Nandurbar	3	Nandurbar (ST)	BJP	Vijaykumar Krishnarao Gavit	INC	Kiran Tadvi
Nandurbar	4	Navapur (ST)	NCP	Bharat Gavit	INC	Shirishkumar Surupsing Naik
Dhule	5	Sakri (ST)	SHS	Manjula Gavit	INC	Pravin Bapu Chaure
Dhule	6	Dhule Rural	BJP	Raghavendra Patil	INC	Kunal Rohidas Patil
Dhule	7	Dhule City	BJP	Anup Agrawal	SS(UBT)	Anil Anna Gote
Dhule	8	Sindkheda	BJP	Jayakumar Jitendrasinh Rawal	NCP-SP	Sandeep Bedse
Dhule	9	Shirpur (ST)	BJP	Kashiram Vechan Pawara	CPI	Budha Mala Pavara
Jalgaon	10	Chopda (ST)	SHS	Chandrakant Sonawane	SS(UBT)	Prabhakarappa Sonawane
Jalgaon	11	Raver	BJP	Amol Haribhau Jawale	INC	Dhananjay Shirish Chaudhari
Jalgaon	12	Bhusawal (SC)	BJP	Sanjay Waman Sawakare	INC	Rajesh Tukaram Manvatkar
Jalgaon	13	Jalgaon City	BJP	Suresh Damu Bhole	SS(UBT)	Jayshree Mahajan
Jalgaon	14	Jalgaon Rural	SHS	Gulab Raghunath Patil	NCP-SP	Gulabrao Deokar
Jalgaon	15	Amalner	NCP	Anil Bhaidas Patil	INC	Anil Shinde
Jalgaon	16	Erandol	SHS	Amol Patil	NCP-SP	Satish Anna Patil
Jalgaon	17	Chalisgaon	BJP	Mangesh Chavan	SS(UBT)	Unmesh Bhaiyyasaheb Patil
Jalgaon	18	Pachora	SHS	Kishor Appa Patil	SS(UBT)	Vaishali Suryawanshi
Jalgaon	19	Jamner	BJP	Girish Mahajan	NCP-SP	Dilip Khodpe
Jalgaon	20	Muktainagar	SHS	Chandrakant Nimba Patil	NCP-SP	Rohini Khadse-Khewalkar
Buldhana	21	Malkapur	BJP	Chainsukh Madanlal Sancheti	INC	Rajesh Panditrao Ekade
Buldhana	22	Buldhana	SHS	Sanjay Gaikwad	SS(UBT)	Jayshree Shelke
Buldhana	23	Chikhali	BJP	Shweta Mahale	INC	Rahul Siddhvinayak Bondre
Buldhana	24	Sindkhed Raja	SHS	Shashikant Narsingrao Khedekar	NCP-SP	Rajendra Shingne
Buldhana	24	Sindkhed Raja	NCP	Manoj Kayande	NCP-SP	Rajendra Shingne
Buldhana	25	Mehkar (SC)	SHS	Sanjay Raimulkar	SS(UBT)	Siddharth Kharat
Buldhana	26	Khamgaon	BJP	Akash Pandurang Fundkar	INC	Dilip Sananda
Buldhana	27	Jalgaon (Jamod)	BJP	Sanjay Kute	INC	Swati Sandip Wakekar
Akola	28	Akot	BJP	Prakash Bharsakale	INC	Mahesh Gangane
Akola	29	Balapur	SHS	Baliram Sirskar	SS(UBT)	Nitin Tale
Akola	30	Akola West	BJP	Vijay Agarwal	INC	Sajid Khan Pathan
Akola	31	Akola East	BJP	Randhir Savarkar	SS(UBT)	Gopal Datarkar
Akola	32	Murtizapur (SC)	BJP	Harish Marotiappa Pimple	NCP-SP	Samrat Dongardive
Washim	33	Risod	SHS	Bhavana Gawali	INC	Amit Subhashrao Zanak
Washim	34	Washim (SC)	BJP	Shyam Ramcharan Khode	SS(UBT)	Siddharth Deole
Washim	35	Karanja	BJP	Sai Prakash Dahake	NCP-SP	Gyayak Patni
Amravati	36	Dhamangaon Railway	BJP	Pratap Adsad	INC	Virendra Jagtap
Amravati	37	Badnera	RYSP	Ravi Rana	SS(UBT)	Sunil Kharate
Amravati	38	Amravati	NCP	Sulbha Khodke	INC	Sunil Deshmukh
Amravati	39	Teosa	BJP	Rajesh Shriramji Wankhade	INC	Yashomati Chandrakant Thakur
Amravati	40	Daryapur (SC)	RYSP	Ramesh Bundile	SS(UBT)	Gajanan Lawate
Amravati	40	Daryapur (SC)	SHS	Abhijit Adsul	SS(UBT)	Gajanan Lawate
Amravati	41	Melghat (ST)	BJP	Kewalram Kale	INC	Hemant Nanda Chimote
Amravati	42	Achalpur	BJP	Pravin Tayde	INC	Aniruddha Deshmukh
Amravati	43	Morshi	BJP	Chandu Atmaramji Yawalkar	NCP-SP	Girish Karale
Amravati	43	Morshi	NCP	Devendra Bhuyar	NCP-SP	Girish Karale
Wardha	44	Arvi	BJP	Sumit Wankhede	NCP-SP	Mayura Kale
Wardha	45	Deoli	BJP	Rajesh Bhaurao Bakane	INC	Ranjit Kamble
Wardha	46	Hinganghat	BJP	Samir Kunawar	NCP-SP	Atul Wandile
Wardha	47	Wardha	BJP	Pankaj Bhoyar	INC	Shekhar Pramodbabu Shende
Nagpur	48	Katol	BJP	Charansing Thakur	NCP-SP	Salil Deshmukh
Nagpur	49	Savner	BJP	Ashish Deshmukh	INC	Anuja Kedar
Nagpur	50	Hingna	BJP	Sameer Meghe	NCP-SP	Rameshchandra Bang
Nagpur	51	Umred (SC)	BJP	Sudhir Parwe	INC	Sanjay Meshram
Nagpur	52	Nagpur South West	BJP	Devendra Fadnavis	INC	Prafulla Gudadhe-Patil
Nagpur	53	Nagpur South	BJP	Mohan Mate	INC	Girish Krushnarao Pandav
Nagpur	54	Nagpur East	BJP	Krishna Khopde	NCP-SP	Duneshwar Pethe
Nagpur	55	Nagpur Central	BJP	Pravin Datke	INC	Bunty Shelke
Nagpur	56	Nagpur West	BJP	Sudhakar Kohale	INC	Vikas Thakre
Nagpur	57	Nagpur North (SC)	BJP	Milind Mane	INC	Nitin Raut
Nagpur	58	Kamthi	BJP	Chandrashekhar Bawankule	INC	Suresh Yadavrao Bhoyar
Nagpur	59	Ramtek	SHS	Ashish Jaiswal	SS(UBT)	Vishal Barbate
Bhandara	60	Tumsar	NCP	Raju Karemore	NCP-SP	Charan Waghmare
Bhandara	61	Bhandara (SC)	SHS	Narendra Bhondekar	INC	Puja Ganesh Thavkar
Bhandara	62	Sakoli	BJP	Avinash Anandrao Brahmankar	INC	Nana Patole
Gondia	63	Arjuni-Morgaon (SC)	NCP	Rajkumar Badole	INC	Dilip Waman Bansod
Gondia	64	Tirora	BJP	Vijay Rahangdale	NCP-SP	Ravikant Bopche
Gondia	65	Gondiya	BJP	Vinod Agrawal	INC	Gopaldas Agrawal
Gondia	66	Amgaon (ST)	BJP	Sanjay Puram	INC	Rajkumar Lotuji Puram
Gadchiroli	67	Armori (ST)	BJP	Krushna Gajbe	INC	Ramdas Masram
Gadchiroli	68	Gadchiroli (ST)	BJP	Milind Ramji Narote	INC	Manohar Tulshiram Poreti
Gadchiroli	69	Aheri (ST)	NCP	Dharamrao Baba Atram	NCP-SP	Bhagyashree Atram
Chandrapur	70	Rajura	BJP	Deorao Vithoba Bhongle	INC	Subhash Dhote
Chandrapur	71	Chandrapur (SC)	BJP	Kishor Jorgewar	INC	Pravin Nanaji Padwekar
Chandrapur	72	Ballarpur	BJP	Sudhir Mungantiwar	INC	Santoshsingh Rawat
Chandrapur	73	Bramhapuri	BJP	Krishnalal Bajirao Sahare	INC	Vijay Wadettiwar
Chandrapur	74	Chimur	BJP	Bunty Bhangdiya	INC	Satish Warjurkar
Chandrapur	75	Warora	BJP	Karan Deotale	INC	Pravin Suresh Kakade
Yavatmal	76	Wani	BJP	Sanjivreddi Bodkurwar	SS(UBT)	Sanjay Derkar
Yavatmal	77	Ralegaon (ST)	BJP	Ashok Uike	INC	Vasantrao Purke
Yavatmal	78	Yavatmal	BJP	Madan Yerawar	INC	Balasaheb Mangulkar
Yavatmal	79	Digras	SHS	Sanjay Rathod	INC	Manikrao Thakare
Yavatmal	80	Arni (ST)	BJP	Raju Narayan Todsam	INC	Jitendra Shivajirao Moghe
Yavatmal	81	Pusad	NCP	Indranil Naik	NCP-SP	Sharad Apparaoji Maind
Yavatmal	82	Umarkhed (SC)	BJP	Kishan Maruti Wankhede	INC	Sahebrao Dattrao Kamble
Nanded	83	Kinwat	BJP	Bhimrao Keram	NCP-SP	Pradeep Jadhav (Naik)
Nanded	84	Hadgaon	SHS	Baburao Kadam Kohalikar	INC	Madhavrao Nivruttirao Patil
Nanded	85	Bhokar	BJP	Sreejaya Chavan	INC	Tirupati Kadam Kondhekar
Nanded	86	Nanded North	SHS	Balaji Kalyankar	INC	Abdul Sattar Abdul Gafur
Nanded	87	Nanded South	SHS	Anand Shankar Tidke Patil	INC	Mohanrao Marotrao Hambarde
Nanded	88	Loha	NCP	Prataprao Patil Chikhalikar	SS(UBT)	Eknath Pawar
Nanded	89	Naigaon	BJP	Rajesh Pawar	INC	Minal Niranjan Patil
Nanded	90	Deglur (SC)	BJP	Jitesh Antapurkar	INC	Nivratirao Kondiba Kamble
Nanded	91	Mukhed	BJP	Tushar Rathod	INC	Hanmantrao Betmogarekar
Hingoli	92	Basmath	NCP	Chandrakant Nawghare	NCP-SP	Jayprakash Dandegaonkar
Hingoli	92	Basmath	JSS	Gurupadeshwar Shivacharya	NCP-SP	Jayprakash Dandegaonkar
Hingoli	93	Kalamnuri	SHS	Santosh Bangar	SS(UBT)	Santosh Tarfe
Hingoli	94	Hingoli	BJP	Tanaji Mutkule	SS(UBT)	Rupali Patil
Parbhani	95	Jintur	BJP	Meghana Bordikar	NCP-SP	Vijay Bhamble
Parbhani	96	Parbhani	SHS	Anand Bharose	SS(UBT)	Rahul Patil
Parbhani	97	Gangakhed	RSPS	Ratnakar Gutte	SS(UBT)	Vishal Kadam
Parbhani	98	Pathri	NCP	Rajesh Vitekar	INC	Suresh Warpudkar
Jalna	99	Partur	BJP	Babanrao Lonikar	SS(UBT)	Asaram Borade
Jalna	100	Ghansawangi	SHS	Hikmat Udhan	NCP-SP	Rajesh Tope
Jalna	101	Jalna	SHS	Arjun Khotkar	INC	Kailas Gorantyal
Jalna	102	Badnapur (SC)	BJP	Narayan Kuche	NCP-SP	Rupkumar "Bablu" Choudhary
Jalna	103	Bhokardan	BJP	Santosh Danve	NCP-SP	Chandrakant Danve
Aurangabad	104	Sillod	SHS	Abdul Sattar	SS(UBT)	Suresh Bankar
Aurangabad	105	Kannad	SHS	Sanjana Jadhav	SS(UBT)	Udaysingh Rajput
Aurangabad	106	Phulambri	BJP	Arunadhatai Atul Chavan	INC	Vilas Autade
Aurangabad	107	Aurangabad Central	SHS	Pradeep Jaiswal	SS(UBT)	Balasaheb Thorat
Aurangabad	108	Aurangabad West (SC)	SHS	Sanjay Shirsat	SS(UBT)	Raju Shinde
Aurangabad	109	Aurangabad East	BJP	Atul Save	INC	Lahu Hanmantrao Shewale
Aurangabad	110	Paithan	SHS	Sandipanrao Bhumre	SS(UBT)	Dattatray Radhakrishnan Gorde
Aurangabad	111	Gangapur	BJP	Prashant Bamb	NCP-SP	Satish Chavan
Aurangabad	112	Vaijapur	SHS	Ramesh Bornare	SS(UBT)	Dinesh Pardeshi
Nashik	113	Nandgaon	SHS	Suhas Kande	SS(UBT)	Ganesh Dhatrak
Nashik	114	Malegaon Central	(Note: No Candidate.)		INC	Ejaz Baig Aziz Baig
Nashik	115	Malegaon Outer	SHS	Dadaji Bhuse	SS(UBT)	Advay Hiray
Nashik	116	Baglan (ST)	BJP	Dilip Borse	NCP-SP	Dipika Chavan
Nashik	117	Kalwan (ST)	NCP	Nitin Pawar	CPI(M)	Jiva Pandu Gavit
Nashik	118	Chandwad	BJP	Rahul Aher	INC	Shirishkumar Kotwal
Nashik	119	Yevla	NCP	Chhagan Bhujbal	NCP-SP	Manikrao Shinde
Nashik	120	Sinnar	NCP	Manikrao Kokate	NCP-SP	Uday Sangle
Nashik	121	Niphad	NCP	Diliprao Bankar	SS(UBT)	Anil Kadam
Nashik	122	Dindori (ST)	NCP	Narhari Zirwal	NCP-SP	Sunita Charoskar
Nashik	123	Nashik East	BJP	Rahul Dhikale	NCP-SP	Ganesh Gite
Nashik	124	Nashik Central	BJP	Devayani Farande	SS(UBT)	Vasantrao Gite
Nashik	125	Nashik West	BJP	Seema Hiray	SS(UBT)	Sudhakar Budgujar
Nashik	126	Deolali (SC)	NCP	Saroj Ahire	SS(UBT)	Yogesh Gholap
Nashik	126	Deolali (SC)	SHS	Rajarshi Harishchandra Ahirrao	SS(UBT)	Yogesh Gholap
Nashik	127	Igatpuri (ST)	NCP	Hiraman Khoskar	INC	Lucky Jadhav
Palghar	128	Dahanu (ST)	BJP	Vinod Suresh Medha	CPI(M)	Vinod Bhiva Nikole
Palghar	129	Vikramgad (ST)	BJP	Bhoye Harishchandra Sakharam	NCP-SP	Sunil Chandrakant Bhusara
Palghar	130	Palghar (ST)	SHS	Rajendra Gavit	SS(UBT)	Jayendra Dubla
Palghar	131	Boisar (ST)	SHS	Vilas Tare	SS(UBT)	Vishwas Valvi
Palghar	132	Nalasopara	BJP	Rajan Naik	INC	Sandeep Pandey
Palghar	133	Vasai	BJP	Sneha Pandit	INC	Vijay Govind Patil
Thane	134	Bhiwandi Rural (ST)	SHS	Shantaram More	SS(UBT)	Mahadeo Ghatal
Thane	135	Shahapur (ST)	NCP	Daulat Daroda	NCP-SP	Pandurang Barora
Thane	136	Bhiwandi West	BJP	Mahesh Choughule	INC	Dayanand Motiram Choraghe
Thane	137	Bhiwandi East	SHS	Santosh Shetty	SP	Rais Shaikh
Thane	138	Kalyan West	SHS	Vishwanath Bhoir	SS(UBT)	Sachin Basre
Thane	139	Murbad	BJP	Kisan Kathore	NCP-SP	Subhash Pawar
Thane	140	Ambernath (SC)	SHS	Balaji Kinikar	SS(UBT)	Rajesh Wankhede
Thane	141	Ulhasnagar	BJP	Kumar Ailani	NCP-SP	Omie Kalani
Thane	142	Kalyan East	BJP	Sulabha Ganpat Gaikwad	SS(UBT)	Dhananjay Bodare
Thane	143	Dombivali	BJP	Ravindra Chavan	SS(UBT)	Dipesh Mahtre
Thane	144	Kalyan Rural	SHS	Rajesh More	SS(UBT)	Subhash Bhoir
Thane	145	Mira Bhayandar	BJP	Narendra Mehta	INC	Syed Muzaffar Hussain
Thane	146	Ovala-Majiwada	SHS	Pratap Sarnaik	SS(UBT)	Naresh Manera
Thane	147	Kopri-Pachpakhadi	SHS	Eknath Shinde	SS(UBT)	Kedar Dighe
Thane	148	Thane	BJP	Sanjay Kelkar	SS(UBT)	Rajan Vichare
Thane	149	Mumbra-Kalwa	NCP	Najeeb Mulla	NCP-SP	Jitendra Awhad
Thane	150	Airoli	BJP	Ganesh Naik	SS(UBT)	Manohar Madhavi
Thane	151	Belapur	BJP	Manda Mhatre	NCP-SP	Sandeep Naik
Mumbai Suburban	152	Borivali	BJP	Sanjay Upadhyay	SS(UBT)	Sanjay Waman Bhosale
Mumbai Suburban	153	Dahisar	BJP	Manisha Chaudhary	SS(UBT)	Vinod Ghosalkar
Mumbai Suburban	154	Magathane	SHS	Prakash Surve	SS(UBT)	Udesh Patekar
Mumbai Suburban	155	Mulund	BJP	Mihir Kotecha	INC	Rakesh Shetty
Mumbai Suburban	156	Vikhroli	SHS	Suvarna Karanje	SS(UBT)	Sunil Raut
Mumbai Suburban	157	Bhandup West	SHS	Ashok Patil	SS(UBT)	Ramesh Korgaonkar
Mumbai Suburban	158	Jogeshwari East	SHS	Manisha Waikar	SS(UBT)	Anant Nar
Mumbai Suburban	159	Dindoshi	SHS	Sanjay Nirupam	SS(UBT)	Sunil Prabhu
Mumbai Suburban	160	Kandivali East	BJP	Atul Bhatkhalkar	INC	Kalu Badheliya
Mumbai Suburban	161	Charkop	BJP	Yogesh Sagar	INC	Yashwant Jayprakash Singh
Mumbai Suburban	162	Malad West	BJP	Vinod Shelar	INC	Aslam Shaikh
Mumbai Suburban	163	Goregaon	BJP	Vidya Thakur	SS(UBT)	Sameer Desai
Mumbai Suburban	164	Versova	BJP	Bharati Lavekar	SS(UBT)	Haroon Rashid Khan
Mumbai Suburban	165	Andheri West	BJP	Ameet Satam	INC	Ashok Jadhav
Mumbai Suburban	166	Andheri East	SHS	Murji Patel	SS(UBT)	Rutuja Latke
Mumbai Suburban	167	Vile Parle	BJP	Parag Alavani	SS(UBT)	Sandeep Naik
Mumbai Suburban	168	Chandivali	SHS	Dilip Lande	INC	Naseem Khan
Mumbai Suburban	169	Ghatkopar West	BJP	Ram Kadam	SS(UBT)	Sanjay Bhalerao
Mumbai Suburban	170	Ghatkopar East	BJP	Parag Shah	NCP-SP	Rakhi Jadhav
Mumbai Suburban	171	Mankhurd Shivaji Nagar	NCP	Nawab Malik	SP	Abu Asim Azmi
Mumbai Suburban	171	Mankhurd Shivaji Nagar	SHS	Suresh Patel	SP	Abu Asim Azmi
Mumbai Suburban	172	Anushakti Nagar	NCP	Sana Malik	NCP-SP	Fahad Ahmad
Mumbai Suburban	173	Chembur	SHS	Tukaram Kate	SS(UBT)	Prakash Phatarphekar
Mumbai Suburban	174	Kurla (SC)	SHS	Mangesh Kudalkar	SS(UBT)	Praveena Morajkar
Mumbai Suburban	175	Kalina	BJP	Amarjeet Singh	SS(UBT)	Sanjay Potnis
Mumbai Suburban	176	Vandre East	NCP	Zeeshan Siddique	SS(UBT)	Varun Sardesai
Mumbai Suburban	177	Vandre West	BJP	Ashish Shelar	INC	Asif Zakaria
Mumbai City	178	Dharavi (SC)	SHS	Rajesh Khandare	INC	Jyoti Gaikwad
Mumbai City	179	Sion Koliwada	BJP	R. Tamil Selvan	INC	Ganesh Kumar Yadav
Mumbai City	180	Wadala	BJP	Kalidas Kolambkar	SS(UBT)	Shraddha Jadhav
Mumbai City	181	Mahim	SHS	Sada Sarvankar	SS(UBT)	Mahesh Sawant
Mumbai City	182	Worli	SHS	Milind Deora	SS(UBT)	Aaditya Thackeray
Mumbai City	183	Shivadi	(Note: Maha Yuti extend its Support to Bala Nandgaonkar of MNS in Shivadi constituency.)		SS(UBT)	Ajay Choudhari
Mumbai City	184	Byculla	SHS	Yamini Jadhav	SS(UBT)	Manoj Jamsutkar
Mumbai City	185	Malabar Hill	BJP	Mangal Lodha	SS(UBT)	Bherulal Choudhary
Mumbai City	186	Mumbadevi	SHS	Shaina NC	INC	Amin Patel
Mumbai City	187	Colaba	BJP	Rahul Narwekar	INC	Heera Devasi
Raigad	188	Panvel	BJP	Prashant Thakur	PWPI	Balaram Dattatrey Patil
Raigad	188	Panvel	BJP	Prashant Thakur	SS(UBT)	Leena Garad
Raigad	189	Karjat	SHS	Mahendra Thorve	SS(UBT)	Nitin Sawant
Raigad	190	Uran	BJP	Mahesh Baldi	PWPI	Pritam J.M. Mhatre
Raigad	190	Uran	BJP	Mahesh Baldi	SS(UBT)	Manohar Bhoir
Raigad	191	Pen	BJP	Ravisheth Patil	SS(UBT)	Prasad Bhoir
Raigad	192	Alibag	SHS	Mahendra Dalvi	PWPI	Chitralekha Patil (Chiutai)
Raigad	193	Shrivardhan	NCP	Aditi Tatkare	NCP-SP	Anil Dattaram Navgane
Raigad	194	Mahad	SHS	Bharatshet Gogawale	SS(UBT)	Snehal Jagtap
Pune	195	Junnar	NCP	Atul Vallabh Benke	NCP-SP	Satyashil Sherkar
Pune	196	Ambegaon	NCP	Dilip Walse Patil	NCP-SP	Devdutt Nikkam
Pune	197	Khed Alandi	NCP	Dilip Mohite	SS(UBT)	Babaji Kale
Pune	198	Shirur	NCP	Dnyaneshwar Katke	NCP-SP	Ashok Raosaheb Pawar
Pune	199	Daund	BJP	Rahul Kul	NCP-SP	Ramesh Thorat
Pune	200	Indapur	NCP	Dattatray Vithoba Bharne	NCP-SP	Harshvardhan Patil
Pune	201	Baramati	NCP	Ajit Pawar	NCP-SP	Yugendra Pawar
Pune	202	Purandar	SHS	Vijay Shivtare	INC	Sanjay Jagtap
Pune	202	Purandar	NCP	Sambhaji Zende	INC	Sanjay Jagtap
Pune	203	Bhor	NCP	Shankar Mandekar	INC	Sangram Anantrao Thopate
Pune	204	Maval	NCP	Sunil Shelke	Independent	Bapu Bhegade
Pune	205	Chinchwad	BJP	Shankar Jagtap	NCP-SP	Rahul Kalate
Pune	206	Pimpri (SC)	NCP	Anna Bansode	NCP-SP	Sulakshana Shilwant
Pune	207	Bhosari	BJP	Mahesh Landge	NCP-SP	Ajit Gavhane
Pune	208	Vadgaon Sheri	NCP	Sunil Tingre	NCP-SP	Bapusaheb Pathare
Pune	209	Shivajinagar	BJP	Siddharth Shirole	INC	Dattatrey Bahirat
Pune	210	Kothrud	BJP	Chandrakant Patil	SS(UBT)	Chandrakant Mokate
Pune	211	Khadakwasala	BJP	Bhimrao Tapkir	NCP-SP	Sachin Dodke
Pune	212	Parvati	BJP	Madhuri Misal	NCP-SP	Ashwini Nitin Kadam
Pune	213	Hadapsar	NCP	Chetan Tupe	NCP-SP	Prashant Jagtap
Pune	214	Pune Cantonment (SC)	BJP	Sunil Kamble	INC	Ramesh Bagwe
Pune	215	Kasba Peth	BJP	Hemant Rasane	INC	Ravindra Dhangekar
Ahmednagar	216	Akole (ST)	NCP	Kiran Lahamate	NCP-SP	Amit Bhangre
Ahmednagar	217	Sangamner	SHS	Amol Khatal	INC	Balasaheb Thorat
Ahmednagar	218	Shirdi	BJP	Radhakrishna Vikhe Patil	INC	Prabhavati Ghogare
Ahmednagar	219	Kopargaon	NCP	Ashutosh Kale	NCP-SP	Sandeep Varpe
Ahmednagar	220	Shrirampur (SC)	SHS	Bhausaheb Kamble	INC	Hemant Ogale
Ahmednagar	220	Shrirampur (SC)	NCP	Lahu Kanade	INC	Hemant Ogale
Ahmednagar	221	Nevasa	SHS	Vitthal Langhe	SS(UBT)	Shankarrao Gadakh
Ahmednagar	222	Shevgaon	BJP	Monika Rajale	NCP-SP	Pratap Dhakane
Ahmednagar	223	Rahuri	BJP	Shivaji Kardile	NCP-SP	Prajakt Tanpure
Ahmednagar	224	Parner	NCP	Kashinath Date	NCP-SP	Rani Lanke
Ahmednagar	225	Ahmednagar City	NCP	Sangram Jagtap	NCP-SP	Abhishek Kalamkar
Ahmednagar	226	Shrigonda	BJP	Vikram Babanrao Pachpute	SS(UBT)	Anuradha Nagavade
Ahmednagar	227	Karjat Jamkhed	BJP	Ram Shinde	NCP-SP	Rohit Rajendra Pawar
Beed	228	Georai	NCP	Vijaysinh Pandit	SS(UBT)	Badamrao Pandit
Beed	229	Majalgaon	NCP	Prakashdada Solanke	NCP-SP	Mohan Bajirao Jagtap
Beed	230	Beed	NCP	Yogesh Kshirsagar		
Beed	230	Beed	NCP	Yogesh Kshirsagar	NCP-SP	Sandeep Kshirsagar
Beed	231	Ashti	BJP	Suresh Dhas	NCP-SP	Mehboob Shaikh
Beed	231	Ashti	NCP	Balasaheb Ajabe	NCP-SP	Mehboob Shaikh
Beed	232	Kaij (SC)	BJP	Namita Mundada	NCP-SP	Pruthviraj Sathe
Beed	233	Parli	NCP	Dhananjay Munde	NCP-SP	Rajasaheb Deshmukh
Latur	234	Latur Rural	BJP	Ramesh Karad	INC	Dhiraj Deshmukh
Latur	235	Latur City	BJP	Archana Patil Chakurkar	INC	Amit Deshmukh
Latur	236	Ahmedpur	NCP	Babasaheb Patil	NCP-SP	Vinayakrao Kishanrao Jadhav Patil
Latur	237	Udgir (SC)	NCP	Sanjay Bansode	NCP-SP	Sudhakar Bhalerao
Latur	238	Nilanga	BJP	Sambhaji Patil Nilangekar	INC	Abhay Satish Salunkhe
Latur	239	Ausa	BJP	Abhimanyu Pawar	SS(UBT)	Dinkar Baburao Mane
Osmanabad	240	Umarga (SC)	SHS	Dnyanraj Chougule	SS(UBT)	Pravin Swami
Osmanabad	241	Tuljapur	BJP	Ranajagjitsinha Patil	INC	Kuldeep Dhiraj Patil
Osmanabad	242	Osmanabad	SHS	Ajit Pingle	SS(UBT)	Kailas Patil
Osmanabad	243	Paranda	SHS	Tanaji Sawant	NCP-SP	Rahul Mote
Solapur	244	Karmala	SHS	Digvijay Bagal	NCP-SP	Narayan Patil
Solapur	245	Madha	NCP	Meenal Sathe	NCP-SP	Abhijit Patil
Solapur	246	Barshi	SHS	Rajendra Raut	SS(UBT)	Dilip Sopal
Solapur	247	Mohol (SC)	NCP	Yashwant Mane	NCP-SP	Raju Khare
Solapur	248	Solapur City North	BJP	Vijay Deshmukh	NCP-SP	Mahesh Kothe
Solapur	249	Solapur City Central	BJP	Devendra Rajesh Kothe	INC	Chetan Narote
Solapur	249	Solapur City Central	BJP	Devendra Rajesh Kothe	CPI(M)	Narsayya Adam
Solapur	250	Akkalkot	BJP	Sachin Kalyanshetti	INC	Siddharam Satlingappa Mhetre
Solapur	251	Solapur South	BJP	Subhash Deshmukh	SS(UBT)	Amar Patil
Solapur	252	Pandharpur	BJP	Samadhan Autade	INC	Bhagirath Bhaike
Solapur	252	Pandharpur	BJP	Samadhan Autade	NCP-SP	Anil Sawant
Solapur	253	Sangola	SHS	Shahajibapu Patil	SS(UBT)	Dipak Salunkhe
Solapur	254	Malshiras (SC)	BJP	Ram Satpute	NCP-SP	Uttamrao Jankar
Satara	255	Phaltan (SC)	NCP	Sachin Patil	NCP-SP	Deepak Chavan
Satara	256	Wai	NCP	Makrand Jadhav - Patil	NCP-SP	Aruna Devi Pisal
Satara	257	Koregaon	SHS	Mahesh Shinde	NCP-SP	Shashikant Shinde
Satara	258	Man	BJP	Jaykumar Gore	NCP-SP	Prabhakar Gharge
Satara	259	Karad North	BJP	Manoj Bhimrao Ghorpade	NCP-SP	Balasaheb Patil
Satara	260	Karad South	BJP	Atul Suresh Bhosale	INC	Prithviraj Chavan
Satara	261	Patan	SHS	Shambhuraj Desai	SS(UBT)	Harshad Kadam
Satara	262	Satara	BJP	Shivendra Raje Bhosale	SS(UBT)	Amit Kadam
Ratnagiri	263	Dapoli	SHS	Yogesh Kadam	SS(UBT)	Sanjay Kadam
Ratnagiri	264	Guhagar	SHS	Rajesh Bendal	SS(UBT)	Bhaskar Jadhav
Ratnagiri	265	Chiplun	NCP	Shekhar Nikam	NCP-SP	Prashant Yadav
Ratnagiri	266	Ratnagiri	SHS	Uday Samant	SS(UBT)	Surendranath Mane
Ratnagiri	267	Rajapur	SHS	Kiran Samant	SS(UBT)	Rajan Salvi
Sindhudurg	268	Kankavli	BJP	Nitesh Rane	SS(UBT)	Sandesh Parkar
Sindhudurg	269	Kudal	SHS	Nilesh Rane	SS(UBT)	Vaibhav Naik
Sindhudurg	270	Sawantwadi	SHS	Deepak Vasant Kesarkar	SS(UBT)	Rajan Teli
Kolhapur	271	Chandgad	NCP	Rajesh Patil	NCP-SP	Nandinitai Bhabulkar Kupekar
Kolhapur	272	Radhanagari	SHS	Prakashrao Abitkar	SS(UBT)	KP Patil
Kolhapur	273	Kagal	NCP	Hasan Mushrif	NCP-SP	Samarjeetsinh Ghatge
Kolhapur	274	Kolhapur South	BJP	Amal Mahadik	INC	Ruturaj Patil
Kolhapur	275	Karvir	SHS	Chandradip Narke	INC	Rahul Patil
Kolhapur	276	Kolhapur North	SHS	Rajesh Kshirsagar	Independent	Rajesh Latkar
Kolhapur	277	Shahuwadi	JSS	Vinay Kore	SS(UBT)	Satyajeet Patil
Kolhapur	278	Hatkanangle (SC)	JSS	Ashokrao Mane	INC	Raju Awale
Kolhapur	279	Ichalkaranji	BJP	Rahul Prakash Awade	NCP-SP	Madan Karande
Kolhapur	280	Shirol	RSVA	Rajendra Patil Yadravkar	INC	Ganpatrao Appasaheb Patil
Sangli	281	Miraj (SC)	BJP	Suresh Khade	SS(UBT)	Tanaji Satpute
Sangli	282	Sangli	BJP	Sudhir Gadgil	INC	Prithviraj Gulabrao Patil
Sangli	283	Islampur	NCP	Nishikant Bhosale Patil	NCP-SP	Jayant Patil
Sangli	284	Shirala	BJP	Satyajit Deshmukh	NCP-SP	Mansing Fattesingrao Naik
Sangli	285	Palus-Kadegaon	BJP	Sangram Sampatrao Deshmukh	INC	Vishwajeet Kadam
Sangli	286	Khanapur	SHS	Suhas Babar	NCP-SP	Vaibhav Sadashiv Patil
Sangli	287	Tasgaon-Kavathe Mahankal	NCP	Sanjaykaka Patil	NCP-SP	Rohit Patil
Sangli	288	Jat	BJP	Gopichand Padalkar	INC	Vikramsinh Balasaheb Sawant

== Major issues ==
=== Economic concerns ===
With rising inflation and unemployment, particularly in urban areas caused dissatisfaction among voters. In rural regions, issues such as inadequate crop prices and agricultural distress were prominent. According to data from the Periodic Labour Force Survey (PLFS) for April-June 2024, the unemployment rate among youth aged 15 to 29 years in urban areas stood at 16.8%.

=== Women's welfare initiatives ===
The BJP-led Maha Yuti's 'Ladki Bahin' scheme proposed a direct cash transfer of ₹1,500 to women, which was later increased to ₹2,100 in response to the Congress-led MVA's pledge of ₹3,000 per woman. Both alliances also announced similar benefits for youth, senior citizens, and farmers. These promises expected to significantly influence voter preferences, particularly in rural areas facing economic challenges. Additionally, infrastructure development proposals and the perception of which alliance could better attract industrial investments to Maharashtra emerged as key electoral issues.

=== Political Stability ===
Between 2019 and 2024, Maharashtra's political landscape was marked by significant instability, characterized by multiple leadership changes and shifting alliances. In 2019, the dissolution of the pre-election alliance between the BJP and Shiv Sena over power-sharing disagreements led to the formation of the Maha Vikas Aghadi (MVA), comprising Shiv Sena, the Nationalist Congress Party (NCP), and the Indian National Congress, with Uddhav Thackeray as Chief Minister. The MVA government faced internal challenges, including a rebellion in June 2022 by senior Shiv Sena leader Eknath Shinde, which resulted in the collapse of the MVA and Shinde assuming the Chief Minister role with BJP support. Further instability followed in July 2023 when NCP leader Ajit Pawar and a faction of MLAs joined the Shinde-led government, causing a split within the NCP. These successive upheavals resulted in three different administrations within five years, creating a climate of political uncertainty.

== Voting ==
Voters Turnout
District wise map of Maharashtra	No	Districts	Voter turnout %
	1	Ahmednagar	72.47
	2	Akola	64.76
	3	Amravati	66.40
	4	Aurangabad	69.64
	5	Beed	68.88
	6	Bhandara	70.87
	7	Buldhana	70.60
	8	Chandrapur	71.33
	9	Dhule	65.47
	10	Gadchiroli	75.26
	11	Gondia	69.74
	12	Hingoli	72.24
	13	Jalgaon	65.80
	14	Jalna	72.67
	15	Kolhapur	76.63
	16	Latur	67.03
	17	Mumbai City	52.65
	18	Mumbai Suburban	56.39
	19	Nagpur	61.60
	20	Nanded	69.45
	21	Nandurbar	71.88
	22	Nashik	69.12
	23	Osmanabad	65.62
	24	Palghar	66.63
	25	Parbhani	71.45
	26	Pune	61.62
	27	Raigad	69.15
	28	Ratnagiri	65.23
	29	Sangli	72.12
	30	Satara	71.95
	31	Sindhudurg	71.14
	32	Solapur	67.72
	33	Thane	56.93
	34	Wardha	69.29
	35	Washim	67.09
	36	Yavatmal	70.86
Maharashtra			66.05

== Exit polls ==
Date published	Polling agency				Lead
Date published	Polling agency	Maha Yuti	Maha Vikas Aghadi	Others	Lead
20 November 2024	P-MARQ	147-157	106-146	2-8	2-12
20 November 2024	People's Pulse	175-195	85-112	7-12	30-50
20 November 2024	Matrize	150-170	110-130	8-10	5-25
20 November 2024	Lokshahi-Marathi Rudra	148-162	105-120	18-23	3-17
20 November 2024	JVC	150-167	107-125	13-14	5-22
20 November 2024	Today's Chanakya	164-186	89-111	8-18	19-41
20 November 2024	Dainik Bhaskar	125-140	135-150	20-25	Hung
20 November 2024	KK Survey and strategies	225	56	07	150
20 November 2024	Electoral Edge	145	150	20	5
20 November 2024	Poll Diary	122-186	69-121	10-27	Hung
20 November 2024	People's Insight	213	60	15	120-138
20 November 2024	Axis My India	178-200	82-102	6-12	33-55
20 November 2024	CNX Exit Poll	160-179	100-119	6-12	15-34

According to a Lokniti post-poll survey, in the latest election, the Mahayuti garnered 30% of Maratha (including Kunbi) votes and 40% of OBC votes, creating a strong coalition. About 25% of Adivasi voters and 20% of Scheduled Caste (SC) voters supported the Mahayuti. The alliance expanded its base across social groups, while the MVA experienced a decline in support. SC voters displayed diverse voting patterns, with many Buddhists and former Mahars backing parties outside the two alliances. More fragmented voting trends were observed among SCs, Adivasis, and Muslims, as they did not align as strongly with the MVA.

== Results ==
=== Results by alliance or party ===
235	50	3
MY	MVA	Others

Map displaying constituencies won by parties
Seat Share (By alliance)
1. Maha Yuti 85.6 (82.3%)
2. Maha Vikas Aghadi 17.36 (16.7%)
3. Others 1.04 (1.00%)
Vote Share (By alliance)
1. Maha Yuti (49.3%)
2. Maha Vikas Aghadi (35.2%)
3. Others (15.5%)

Alliance/ Party		Popular vote			Seats		
Alliance/ Party		Votes	%	±pp	Contested	Won	+/−
Maha Yuti	BJP	17,293,650	26.77	▲1.02	149	132	▲27
Maha Yuti	SHS	7,996,920	12.38	New	81	57	▲19
Maha Yuti	NCP	5,816,566	9.01	New	59	41	▲1
Maha Yuti	JSS	270,255	0.41	▲0.05	3	2	▲1
Maha Yuti	RSPS	141,544	0.22 (Note: Vote share of only of Gangakhed Assembly constituency which was contested under the Maha Yuti alliance.)	▲0.07	1 (Note: Includes only the Gangakhed Assembly constituency which was contested under the Maha Yuti alliance.)	1	Steady
Maha Yuti	RYSP	195,840	0.30	New	2	1	Steady
Maha Yuti	RSVA	134,630	0.21	New	1	1	▲1
Maha Yuti	Total	31,849,405	49.30	▲7.14	286	235	▲49
Maha Vikas Aghadi	INC	8,020,921	12.42	▼3.45	101	16	▼28
Maha Vikas Aghadi	SS(UBT)	6,433,013	9.96	New	95	20	▲4
Maha Vikas Aghadi	NCP(SP)	7,287,797	11.28	New	86	10	▼2
Maha Vikas Aghadi	SP	247,350	0.38	▲0.16	9	2	Steady
Maha Vikas Aghadi	PWPI	488,735	0.76	▼0.11	5	1	Steady
Maha Vikas Aghadi	CPI(M)	219,493	0.34	▼0.03	3	1	Steady
Maha Vikas Aghadi	CPI	12,911	0.02	▼0.04	1	0	Steady
Maha Vikas Aghadi	Total	22,710,220	35.16		288	50	▼26
Other parties						1	▼10
Independents						2	▼11
NOTA		461,886	0.72				
Total		64,130,622	100%	—			—

=== Region-wise break up ===
Region	Total seats	BJP								
Region	Total seats	BJP		SHS	NCP	INC		SS(UBT)	NCP (SP)	Others
Region	Total seats	Seats Won		Seats Won	Seats Won	Seats Won		Seats Won	Seats Won	Seats Won
Western Maharashtra	70	28	▲8	9	15	2	▼10	2	8	6
Vidarbha	62	38	▲9	4	6	9	▼6	4	0	1
Marathwada	46	19	▲3	13	8	1	▼7	3	1	1
Thane+Konkan	39	16	▲5	16	3	0	▼2	1	1	2
Mumbai	36	15	▼1	6	1	3	▲1	10	0	1
North Maharashtra	35	16	▲3	9	8	1	▼4	0	0	0
Total	288	132	▲27	57	41	16	▼28	20	10	12

=== Alliance-wise Vote Share by Region ===
Region	Mahayuti (NDA) Vote Share (%)	Maha Vikas Aghadi (INDIA) Vote Share (%)
Vidarbha	48.1%	36.0%
Western Maharashtra	48.2%	36.4%
North Maharashtra	53.1%	38.2%
Marathwada	45.4%	30.1%
Konkan & Thane	50.3%	24.5%
Mumbai	45.1%	22.3%
State Total	50.1%	35.4%

=== Party wise vote share ===
Region	Mahayuti			Maha Vikas Aghadi		
Region	BJP	SHS	NCP	INC	SS(UBT)	NCP(SP)
Vidarbha	31.2%	6.4%	4.2%	18.5%	5.8%	6.2%
North Maharashtra	33.4%	11.2%	8.5%	12.1%	9.4%	10.2%
Marathwada	23.5%	14.1%	7.8%	11.4%	10.2%	8.5%
Mumbai	28.6%	12.4%	4.1%	8.2%	11.5%	2.6%
Konkan & Thane	24.2%	21.5%	4.6%	4.5%	14.8%	5.2%
Western Maharashtra	24.8%	8.2%	15.2%	10.6%	6.5%	19.3%
State Average	26.8%	12.4%	9.0%	12.4%	10.0%	11.3%

=== Strike-rate ===
Strike rate is determined by calculating the number of seats won by a party of the number of seats it contested.

Alliance/ Party		Seats contested	Seats Won	Strike Rate (%)
NDA	BJP	149	132	88.59
NDA	SHS	81	57	70.37
NDA	NCP	59	41	69.49
NDA	JSS	3	2	66.67
NDA	RSP	1 (Note: Includes only the Gangakhed Assembly constituency which the Maha Yuti supported.)	1	100.00 (Note: Strike rate of only the Gangakhed Assembly constituency which the Maha Yuti supported.)
NDA	RVSP	2	1	50.00
NDA	RSVA	1	1	100.00
NDA	Total	286	235	82.17
MVA	INC	102	16	15.68
MVA	SS(UBT)	92	20	21.73
MVA	NCP(SP)	86	10	11.62
MVA	SP	9	2	22.22
MVA	PWPI	5	1	20.00
MVA	CPI(M)	3	1	33.33
MVA	CPI	1	0	0.00
MVA	Total	288	50	17.36

=== Division-wise Results ===
Division Name	Seats														
Division Name	Seats	MY						MVA						Others	
Division Name	Seats	BJP		SHS		NCP		INC		SS(UBT)		NCP(SP)		Others	
Amravati division	30	17	▲2	2	▼1	3	▲1	3	▼2	4	▲3	0	0	1	▼3
Ch. Sambhajinagar division	46	19	▲3	13	▲4	8	▲3	1	▼7	3	0	1	▼2	1	▼1
Konkan division	75	31	▲4	22	▲4	4	0	3	▼1	11	0	1	▼1	3	▼6
Nagpur division	32	21	▲7	2	▲2	3	0	6	▼4	0	0	0	▼1	0	▼4
Nashik division	47	20	▲4	11	▲5	12	▲1	2	▼5	0	0	1	▼1	1	▼4
Pune division	58	24	▲7	7	▲2	11	▼6	1	▼10	2	▲2	7	▲4	6	▼1
Total Seats	288	132	▲27	57	▲16	41	▼1	16	▼29	20	▲5	10	▼1	12	▼17

=== Results by district ===
District	Seats			
District	Seats	MHY	MVA	OTH
Nandurbar	4	3	1	—N/a
Dhule	5	5	—N/a	—N/a
Jalgaon	11	11	—N/a	—N/a
Buldhana	7	6	1	—N/a
Akola	5	3	2	—N/a
Washim	3	2	1	—N/a
Amravati	8	7	1	—N/a
Wardha	4	4	—N/a	—N/a
Nagpur	12	9	3	—N/a
Bhandara	3	2	1	—N/a
Gondia	4	4	—N/a	—N/a
Gadchiroli	3	2	1	—N/a
Chandrapur	6	5	1	—N/a
Yavatmal	7	5	2	—N/a
Nanded	9	9	—N/a	—N/a
Hingoli	3	3	—N/a	—N/a
Parbhani	4	3	1	—N/a
Jalna	5	5	—N/a	—N/a
Aurangabad	8	8	—N/a	—N/a
Nashik	15	14	—N/a	1
Palghar	6	5	1	—N/a
Thane	18	16	2	—N/a
Mumbai Suburban	26	18	8	—N/a
Mumbai City	10	4	6	—N/a
Raigad	7	7	—N/a	—N/a
Pune	21	18	2	1
Ahilyanagar	12	10	2	—N/a
Beed	6	5	1	—N/a
Latur	6	5	1	—N/a
Dharashiv	4	2	2	—N/a
Solapur	11	5	6	—N/a
Satara	8	8	—N/a	—N/a
Ratnagiri	5	4	1	—N/a
Sindhudurg	3	3	—N/a	—N/a
Kolhapur	10	9	—N/a	1
Sangli	8	5	3	—N/a
Total	288	235	50	3

=== Results by constituency ===
District	Constituency		Winner				Runner Up				Margin
District	#	Name	Candidate	Party	Votes	%	Candidate	Party	Votes	%	Margin
Nandurbar	1	Akkalkuwa (ST)	Aamshya Padavi	SHS	72,629	31.55	Kagda Chandya Padvi	INC	69,725	30.29	2,904
Nandurbar	2	Shahada (ST)	Rajesh Padvi	BJP	1,46,839	59.86	Rajendrakumar Gavit	INC	93,635	38.17	53,204
Nandurbar	3	Nandurbar (ST)	Vijaykumar Gavit	BJP	1,55,190	64.62	Kiran Damodar Tadavi	INC	78,943	32.87	76,247
Nandurbar	4	Navapur (ST)	Shirishkumar Naik	INC	87,166	36.14	Sharad Gavit	IND	86,045	35.67	1,121
Dhule	5	Sakri (ST)	Manjula Gavit	SHS	1,04,649	43.20	Pravin Bapu Chaure	INC	99,065	40.89	5,584
Dhule	6	Dhule Rural	Raghavendra Patil	BJP	1,70,398	58.87	Kunal Rohidas Patil	INC	1,04,078	35.96	66,320
Dhule	7	Dhule City	Anup Agarwal	BJP	1,16,538	52.88	Shah Faruk Anwar	AIMIM	70,788	32.12	45,750
Dhule	8	Sindkheda	Jayakumar Rawal	BJP	1,51,492	66.98	Sandeep Bedse	NCP-SP	55,608	24.59	95,884
Dhule	9	Shirpur (ST)	Kashiram Pawara	BJP	1,78,073	76.70	Jitendra Yuvraj Thakur	IND	32,129	13.84	1,45,944
Jalgaon	10	Chopda (ST)	Chandrakant Sonawane	SHS	1,22,826	55.18	Prabhakarappa Sonawane	SS(UBT)	90,513	40.66	32,313
Jalgaon	11	Raver	Amol Jawale	BJP	1,13,676	49.30	Dhananjay Chaudhari	INC	70,114	30.41	43,562
Jalgaon	12	Bhusawal (SC)	Sanjay Savkare	BJP	1,07,259	58.20	Rajesh Manwatkar	INC	59,771	32.43	47,488
Jalgaon	13	Jalgaon City	Suresh Bhole	BJP	1,51,536	62.82	Jayashri Mahajan	SS(UBT)	64,033	26.54	87,503
Jalgaon	14	Jalgaon Rural	Gulabrao Patil	SHS	1,43,408	60.90	Gulabrao Deokar	NCP-SP	84,176	35.75	59,232
Jalgaon	15	Amalner	Anil Bhaidas Patil	NCP	1,09,445	53.50	Shirish Chaudhari	IND	76,010	37.16	33,435
Jalgaon	16	Erandol	Amol Patil	SHS	1,01,088	49.63	Satish Anna Patil	NCP-SP	44,756	21.97	56,332
Jalgaon	17	Chalisgaon	Mangesh Chavan	BJP	1,57,101	67.08	Unmesh Patil	SS(UBT)	71,448	30.51	85,653
Jalgaon	18	Pachora	Kishor Patil	SHS	97,366	41.98	Vaishali Suryawanshi	SS(UBT)	58,677	25.30	38,689
Jalgaon	19	Jamner	Girish Mahajan	BJP	1,28,667	53.84	Dilip Baliram Khopade	NCP-SP	1,01,782	42.59	26,885
Jalgaon	20	Muktainagar	Chandrakant Nimba Patil	SHS	1,12,318	51.86	Rohini Khadse-Khewalkar	NCP-SP	88,414	40.82	26,885
Buldhana	21	Malkapur	Chainsukh Sancheti	BJP	1,09,921	52.98	Rajesh Ekade	INC	83,524	40.25	26,397
Buldhana	22	Buldhana	Sanjay Gaikwad	SHS	91,660	47.06	Jayashree Shelke	SS(UBT)	90,819	46.63	841
Buldhana	23	Chikhali	Shweta Mahale	BJP	1,09,212	48.88	Rahul Bondre	INC	1,06,011	47.45	3,201
Buldhana	24	Sindkhed Raja	Manoj Kayande	NCP	73,413	31.85	Rajendra Shingne	NCP-SP	68,763	29.84	4,650
Buldhana	25	Mehkar (SC)	Siddharth Kharat	SS(UBT)	1,04,242	48.68	Sanjay Raimulkar	SHS	99,423	46.43	4,819
Buldhana	26	Khamgaon	Akash Fundkar	BJP	1,10,599	48.40	Rana Dilipkumar Sananda	INC	85,122	37.25	25,477
Buldhana	27	Jalgaon (Jamod)	Sanjay Kute	BJP	1,07,318	47.19	Swati Wakekar	INC	88,547	38.94	18,771
Akola	28	Akot	Prakash Bharsakle	BJP	93,338	43.51	Mahesh Gangane	INC	74,487	34.72	18,851
Akola	29	Balapur	Nitin Deshmukh	SS(UBT)	82,088	37.04	S. N. Khatib	VBA	70,349	31.74	11,739
Akola	30	Akola West	Sajid Khan Pathan	INC	88,718	43.21	Vijay Agrawal	BJP	87,435	42.59	1,283
Akola	31	Akola East	Randhir Savarkar	BJP	1,08,619	48.96	Gopal Datkar	SS(UBT)	58,006	26.14	50,613
Akola	32	Murtizapur (SC)	Harish Pimple	BJP	91,820	43.98	Samrat Dongardive	NCP-SP	55,956	26.80	35,864
Washim	33	Risod	Amit Zanak	INC	76,809	33.25	Anantrao Deshmukh	IND	70,673	26.28	6,136
Washim	34	Washim (SC)	Shyam Khode	BJP	1,22,914	50.10	Siddharth Deole	SS(UBT)	1,03,040	42.01	19,874
Washim	35	Karanja	Sai Prakash Dahake	BJP	85,005	40.64	Gyayak Patni	NCP-SP	49,932	23.87	35,073
Amravati	36	Dhamangaon Railway	Pratap Adsad	BJP	1,10,641	49.54	Virendra Jagtap	INC	94,413	42.27	16,228
Amravati	37	Badnera	Ravi Rana	RVSP	1,27,800	60.14	Priti Band	IND	60,826	28.62	66,974
Amravati	38	Amravati	Sulbha Khodke	NCP	58,804	27.91	Sunil Deshmukh	INC	53,093	25.40	5,413
Amravati	39	Teosa	Rajesh Wankhade	BJP	99,664	49.10	Yashomati Thakur	INC	92,047	45.35	7,617
Amravati	40	Daryapur (SC)	Gajanan Lawate	SS(UBT)	87,749	42.08	Ramesh Bundile	RVSP	68,040	32.63	19,709
Amravati	41	Melghat (ST)	Kewalram Kale	BJP	1,45,978	65.72	Hemant Nanda Chimote	INC	39,119	17.61	1,06,859
Amravati	42	Achalpur	Pawan Tayde	BJP	78,201	36.77	Bacchu Kadu	PHJSP	66,070	31.07	12,131
Amravati	43	Morshi	Chandu Yawalkar	BJP	99,683	47.45	Devendra Bhuyar	NCP	34,695	16.52	64,988
Wardha	44	Arvi	Sumit Wankhede	BJP	1,01,397	52.64	Mayura Kale	NCP-SP	61,823	32.11	39,574
Wardha	45	Deoli	Rajesh Bakane	BJP	90,319	47.31	Ranjit Kamble	INC	81,011	42.43	9,308
Wardha	46	Hinganghat	Samir Kunawar	BJP	1,14,578	53.74	Atul Namdeo	NCP-SP	84,484	39.62	30,094
Wardha	47	Wardha	Pankaj Bhoyar	BJP	92,067	46.65	Shekhar Shende	INC	84,597	42.86	7,470
Nagpur	48	Katol	Charansing Thakur	BJP	1,04,338	52.44	Salil Deshmukh	NCP-SP	65,522	32.93	38,816
Nagpur	49	Savner	Ashish Deshmukh	BJP	1,19725	53.60	Anuja Sunil Kedar	INC	93,324	41.78	26,401
Nagpur	50	Hingna	Sameer Meghe	BJP	1,60,206	59.00	Rameshchandra Bang	NCP-SP	81,275	29.93	78,931
Nagpur	51	Umred (SC)	Sanjay Meshram	INC	85,372	39.54	Sudhir Parwe	BJP	72,547	33.60	12,825
Nagpur	52	Nagpur South West	Devendra Fadnavis	BJP	1,29,401	56.88	Prafulla Gudadhe Patil	INC	89,691	39.43	39,710
Nagpur	53	Nagpur South	Mohan Mate	BJP	1,17,526	51.48	Girish Pandav	INC	1,01,868	44.63	15,658
Nagpur	54	Nagpur East	Krishna Khopde	BJP	1,63,390	65.23	Duneshwar Pethe	NCP-SP	48,102	19.20	1,15,288
Nagpur	55	Nagpur Central	Pravin Datke	BJP	90,560	46.16	Bunty Baba Shelke	INC	78,928	40.23	11,632
Nagpur	56	Nagpur West	Vikas Thakre	INC	1,04,144	47.45	Sudhakar Kohale	BJP	98,320	44.80	5,824
Nagpur	57	Nagpur North (SC)	Nitin Raut	INC	1,27,877	51.02	Milind Mane	BJP	99,410	39.66	28,467
Nagpur	58	Kamthi	Chandrashekhar Bawankule	BJP	1,74,979	54.23	Suresh Bhoyar	INC	1,34,033	41.54	40,946
Nagpur	59	Ramtek	Ashish Jaiswal	SHS	1,07,967	52.04	Rajendra Mulak	IND	81,412	39.24	26,555
Bhandara	60	Tumsar	Raju Karemore	NCP	1,35,813	58.61	Charan Waghmare	NCP-SP	71,508	30.86	64,305
Bhandara	61	Bhandara (SC)	Narendra Bhondekar	SHS	1,27,884	48.82	Puja Thavakar	INC	89,517	34.17	38,367
Bhandara	62	Sakoli	Nana Patole	INC	96,795	41.08	Avinash Brahmankar	BJP	96,587	41.01	208
Gondia	63	Arjuni-Morgaon (SC)	Rajkumar Badole	NCP	82,506	45.04	Dilip Bansod	INC	66,091	36.08	16,415
Gondia	64	Tirora	Vijay Rahangdale	BJP	1,02,984	57.78	Ravikant Bopche	NCP-SP	60,298	33.83	42,686
Gondia	65	Gondiya	Vinod Agrawal	BJP	1,43,012	61.21	Gopaldas Agrawal	INC	81,404	34.84	61,608
Gondia	66	Amgaon (ST)	Sanjay Puram	BJP	1,10,123	55.83	Rajkumar Puram	INC	77,402	39.24	32,721
Gadchiroli	67	Armori (ST)	Ramdas Masram	INC	98,509	48.46	Krishna Gajbe	BJP	92,299	45.40	6,210
Gadchiroli	68	Gadchiroli (ST)	Milind Ramji Narote	BJP	1,16,540	50.16	Manohar Poreti	INC	1,01,035	43.49	15,505
Gadchiroli	69	Aheri (ST)	Dharamrao Baba Atram	NCP	54,206	29.16	Ambrishrao Atram	IND	37,392	20.12	16,814
Chandrapur	70	Rajura	Deorao Bhongle	BJP	72,882	30.53	Subhash Dhote	INC	69,828	29.25	3,054
Chandrapur	71	Chandrapur (SC)	Kishor Jorgewar	BJP	1,06,841	48.67	Pravin Padwekar	INC	84,037	38.28	22,804
Chandrapur	72	Ballarpur	Sudhir Mungantiwar	BJP	1,05,969	48.23	Santosh Rawat	INC	79,984	36.41	25,985
Chandrapur	73	Bramhapuri	Vijay Wadettiwar	INC	1,14,196	50.93	Krishnalal Sahare	BJP	1,00,225	44.70	13,971
Chandrapur	74	Chimur	Bunty Bhangdiya	BJP	1,16,495	50.25	Satish Warjukar	INC	1,06,642	46.00	9,853
Chandrapur	75	Warora	Karan Deotale	BJP	65,170	32.86	Mukesh Jiwtode	IND	49,720	25.07	15,450
Yavatmal	76	Wani	Sanjay Derkar	SS(UBT)	94,618	42.91	Sanjivreddy Bodkurwar	BJP	79,058	35.85	15,560
Yavatmal	77	Ralegaon (ST)	Ashok Uike	BJP	1,01,398	47.33	Vasant Purke	INC	98,586	46.02	2,812
Yavatmal	78	Yavatmal	Balasaheb Mangulkar	INC	1,17,504	49.15	Madan Yerawar	BJP	1,06,123	44.39	11,381
Yavatmal	79	Digras	Sanjay Rathod	SHS	1,43,115	54.24	Manikrao Thakare	INC	1,14,340	43.33	28,775
Yavatmal	80	Arni (ST)	Raju Todsam	BJP	1,27,203	54.01	Jitendra Moghe	INC	97,890	41.57	29,313
Yavatmal	81	Pusad	Indranil Naik	NCP	1,27,964	59.58	Sharad Maind	NCP-SP	37,195	17.39	90,769
Yavatmal	82	Umarkhed (SC)	Kisan Wankhede	BJP	1,08,682	49.42	Sahebrao Kamble	INC	92,053	41.86	16,629
Nanded	83	Kinwat	Bhimrao Keram	BJP	92,856	45.89	Pradeep Naik	NCP-SP	87,220	43.10	5,636
Nanded	84	Hadgaon	Baburao Kadam	SHS	1,13,245	52.34	Madhavrao Patil	INC	83,178	38.45	30,067
Nanded	85	Bhokar	Sreejaya Chavan	BJP	1,33,187	57.08	Tirupati Kadam	INC	82,636	35.41	50,551
Nanded	86	Nanded North	Balaji Kalyankar	SHS	83,184	37.68	Abdul Sattar Gaffoor	INC	79,682	36.10	3,502
Nanded	87	Nanded South	Anand Tidke	SHS	60,445	29.59	Mohanrao Hambarde	INC	58,313	28.55	2,132
Nanded	88	Loha	Prataprao Chikhalikar	NCP	72,750	31.65	Eknathdada Pawar	SS(UBT)	61,777	26.87	10,973
Nanded	89	Naigaon	Rajesh Pawar	BJP	1,29,192	55.63	Meenal Patil Khatgaonkar	INC	81,563	35.12	47,629
Nanded	90	Deglur (SC)	Jitesh Antapurkar	BJP	1,07,841	53.83	Nivrutti Kamble	INC	64,842	32.37	42,999
Nanded	91	Mukhed	Tushar Rathod	BJP	98,213	44.94	Hanmantrao Patil	INC	60,429	27.64	37,784
Hingoli	92	Basmath	Chandrakant Nawghare	NCP	1,07,655	44.41	Jaiprakash Dandegaonkar	NCP-SP	78,067	32.20	29,588
Hingoli	93	Kalamnuri	Santosh Bangar	SHS	1,22,016	49.66	Santosh Tarfe	SS(UBT)	90,933	37.01	31,083
Hingoli	94	Hingoli	Tanaji Mutkule	BJP	74,584	32.45	Rupalitai Rajesh Patil	SS(UBT)	63,658	27.70	10,926
Parbhani	95	Jintur	Meghna Bordikar	BJP	1,13,432	38.52	Vijay Manikrao Bhamale	NCP-SP	1,08,916	36.99	4,516
Parbhani	96	Parbhani	Rahul Vedprakash Patil	SS(UBT)	1,26,803	54.24	Anand Bharose	SHS	92,587	39.60	34,216
Parbhani	97	Gangakhed	Ratnakar Gutte	RSPS	141,544	45.47	Vishal Kadam	SS(UBT)	1,15,252	37.02	26,292
Parbhani	98	Pathri	Rajesh Vitekar	NCP	83,767	29.67	Suresh Warpudkar	INC	70,523	25.06	13,244
Jalna	99	Partur	Babanrao Lonikar	BJP	70,659	30.89	Asaram Borade	SS(UBT)	65,919	28.82	4,740
Jalna	100	Ghansawangi	Hikmat Udhan	SHS	98,496	38.43	Rajesh Tope	NCP-SP	96,187	37.53	2,309
Jalna	101	Jalna	Arjun Khotkar	SHS	1,04,665	46.74	Kailas Gorantyal	INC	73,014	32.60	31,651
Jalna	102	Badnapur (SC)	Narayan Kuche	BJP	1,38,489	55.50	Bablu Chaudhary	NCP-SP	92,958	37.26	45,531
Jalna	103	Bhokardan	Santosh Danve	BJP	1,28,480	51.18	Chandrakant Danwe	NCP-SP	1,05,301	41.95	23,179
Aurangabad	104	Sillod	Abdul Sattar	SHS	1,37,960	47.69	Suresh Pandurang	SS(UBT)	1,35,540	46.85	2,420
Aurangabad	105	Kannad	Sanjana Jadhav	SHS	84,492	36.37	Harshvardhan Jadhav	IND	66,291	28.54	18,201
Aurangabad	106	Phulambri	Anuradha Chavan	BJP	1,35,046	50.08	Vilas Autade	INC	1,02,545	38.03	32,501
Aurangabad	107	Aurangabad Central	Pradeep Jaiswal	SHS	85,459	38.57	Naseruddin Siddiqui	AIMIM	77,340	34.90	8,119
Aurangabad	108	Aurangabad West (SC)	Sanjay Shirsat	SHS	1,22,498	49.28	Raju Shinde	SS(UBT)	1,06,147	42.70	16,351
Aurangabad	109	Aurangabad East	Atul Save	BJP	93,274	43.07	Imtiyaz Jaleel	AIMIM	91,113	42.07	2,161
Aurangabad	110	Paithan	Vilas Bhumre	SHS	1,32,474	52.01	Dattatray Gorde	SS(UBT)	1,03,282	40.55	29,192
Aurangabad	111	Gangapur	Prashant Bamb	BJP	1,25,555	46.57	Satish Chavan	NCP-SP	1,20,540	44.71	5,015
Aurangabad	112	Vaijapur	Ramesh Bornare	SHS	1,33,627	54.56	Dinesh Pardeshi	SS(UBT)	91,969	37.55	41,658
Nashik	113	Nandgaon	Suhas Kande	SHS	1,38,068	56.48	Sameer Bhujbal	IND	48,194	19.72	89,874
Nashik	114	Malegaon Central	Ismail Abdul Khalique	AIMIM	1,09,653	45.66	Shaikh Aasif Rashid	ISLAM	1,09,491	45.59	162
Nashik	115	Malegaon Outer	Dadaji Bhuse	SHS	1,58,284	61.13	Pramod Bachhav	IND	51,678	19.96	1,06,606
Nashik	116	Baglan (ST)	Dilip Borse	BJP	1,59,681	77.71	Dipika Chavan	NCP-SP	30,384	14.79	1,29,297
Nashik	117	Kalwan (ST)	Nitin Pawar	NCP	1,19,191	49.94	Jiva Pandu Gavit	CPI(M)	1,10,759	46.41	8,432
Nashik	118	Chandwad	Rahul Aher	BJP	1,04,826	43.78	Ganesh Nimbalkar	PHJSP	55,865	23.33	48,961
Nashik	119	Yevla	Chhagan Bhujbal	NCP	1,35,023	53.85	Manikrao Shinde	NCP-SP	1,08,623	43.32	26,400
Nashik	120	Sinnar	Manikrao Kokate	NCP	1,38,565	56.93	Uday Sangale	NCP-SP	97,681	40.13	40,884
Nashik	121	Niphad	Diliprao Bankar	NCP	1,20,253	54.59	Anil Kadam	SS(UBT)	91,014	41.31	29,239
Nashik	122	Dindori (ST)	Narhari Zirwal	NCP	1,38,622	53.63	Sunita Charoskar	NCP-SP	94,219	36.45	44,403
Nashik	123	Nashik East	Rahul Dhikale	BJP	1,56,246	64.28	Ganesh Gite	NCP-SP	68,429	28.15	87,817
Nashik	124	Nashik Central	Devayani Farande	BJP	1,05,689	52.67	Vasantrao Gite	SS(UBT)	87,833	43.77	17,856
Nashik	125	Nashik West	Seema Hiray	BJP	1,41,725	51.27	Sudhakar Badgujar	SS(UBT)	73,548	26.61	68,177
Nashik	126	Deolali (SC)	Saroj Ahire	NCP	81,683	44.48	Rajashri Ahirrao	SHS	41,004	22.33	40,679
Nashik	127	Igatpuri (ST)	Hiraman Khoskar	NCP	1,17,575	54.68	Luckybhau Jadhav	INC	30,994	14.41	86,581
Palghar	128	Dahanu (ST)	Vinod Nikole	CPI(M)	104,702	47.21	Vinod Medha	BJP	99,569	44.90	5,133
Palghar	129	Vikramgad (ST)	Harishchandra Bhoye	BJP	1,14,514	46.02	Sunil Bhusara	NCP-SP	73,106	29.38	41,408
Palghar	130	Palghar (ST)	Rajendra Gavit	SHS	1,12,894	52.61	Jayendra Dubla	SS(UBT)	72,557	33.81	40,337
Palghar	131	Boisar (ST)	Vilas Tare	SHS	1,26,117	45.34	Rajesh Raghunath Patil	BVA	81,662	29.36	44,455
Palghar	132	Nalasopara	Rajan Naik	BJP	1,65,113	47.16	Kshitij Thakur	BVA	1,28,238	36.62	36,875
Palghar	133	Vasai	Sneha Pandit	BJP	77,553	35.38	Hitendra Thakur	BVA	74,400	33.94	3,153
Thane	134	Bhiwandi Rural (ST)	Shantaram More	SHS	1,27,205	52.68	Mahadev Ghatal	SS(UBT)	69,243	28.68	57,962
Thane	135	Shahapur (ST)	Daulat Daroda	NCP	73,081	35.34	Pandurang Barora	NCP-SP	71,409	34.54	1,672
Thane	136	Bhiwandi West	Mahesh Choughule	BJP	70,172	38.65	Riyaj Azmi	SP	38,879	21.41	31,293
Thane	137	Bhiwandi East	Rais Shaikh	SP	1,19,687	62.44	Santosh Shetty	SHS	67,672	35.30	52,015
Thane	138	Kalyan West	Vishwanath Bhoir	SHS	1,26,020	51.32	Sachin Basare	SS(UBT)	83,566	34.03	42,454
Thane	139	Murbad	Kisan Kathore	BJP	1,75,509	55.04	Subhash Pawar	NCP-SP	1,23,117	38.61	52,392
Thane	140	Ambernath (SC)	Balaji Kinikar	SHS	1,11,368	60.36	Rajesh Wankhede	SS(UBT)	59,993	32.52	51,375
Thane	141	Ulhasnagar	Kumar Ailani	BJP	82,231	52.98	Omie Pappu Kalani	NCP-SP	51,477	33.17	30,754
Thane	142	Kalyan East	Sulbha Gaikwad	BJP	81,516	42.15	Mahesh Gaikwad	IND	55,108	28.50	26,408
Thane	143	Dombivali	Ravindra Chavan	BJP	1,23,815	70.14	Dipesh Mhatre	SS(UBT)	46,709	26.46	77,106
Thane	144	Kalyan Rural	Rajesh More	SHS	1,41,164	47.68	Pramod Ratan Patil	MNS	74,768	25.26	66,396
Thane	145	Mira Bhayandar	Narendra Mehta	BJP	1,44,376	54.87	Muzaffar Hussain	INC	83,943	31.90	60,433
Thane	146	Ovala-Majiwada	Pratap Sarnaik	SHS	1,84,178	64.50	Naresh Manera	SS(UBT)	76,020	26.62	1,08,158
Thane	147	Kopri-Pachpakhadi	Eknath Shinde	SHS	1,59,060	78.29	Kedar Dighe	SS(UBT)	38,343	18.87	1,20,717
Thane	148	Thane	Sanjay Kelkar	BJP	1,20,373	51.85	Rajan Vichare	SS(UBT)	62,120	26.76	58,253
Thane	149	Mumbra-Kalwa	Jitendra Awhad	NCP-SP	1,57,141	61.93	Najeeb Mulla	NCP	60,913	24.00	96,228
Thane	150	Airoli	Ganesh Naik	BJP	1,44,261	54.42	Vijay Chougule	IND	52,381	19.76	91,880
Thane	151	Belapur	Manda Mhatre	BJP	91,852	39.04	Sandeep Naik	NCP-SP	91,475	38.88	377
Mumbai Suburban	152	Borivali	Sanjay Upadhyay	BJP	1,39,947	68.57	Sanjay Bhosale	SS(UBT)	39,690	19.45	1,00,257
Mumbai Suburban	153	Dahisar	Manisha Chaudhary	BJP	98,587	60.64	Vinod Ghosalkar	SS(UBT)	54,258	33.37	44,329
Mumbai Suburban	154	Magathane	Prakash Surve	SHS	1,05,527	58.15	Udesh Patekar	SS(UBT)	47,363	26.10	58,164
Mumbai Suburban	155	Mulund	Mihir Kotecha	BJP	1,31,549	71.78	Rakesh Shetty	INC	41,517	22.65	90,032
Mumbai Suburban	156	Vikhroli	Sunil Raut	SS(UBT)	66,093	46.86	Suvarna Karanje	SHS	50,567	35.85	15,526
Mumbai Suburban	157	Bhandup West	Ashok Patil	SHS	77,754	42.74	Ramesh Korgaonkar	SS(UBT)	70,990	39.02	6,764
Mumbai Suburban	158	Jogeshwari East	Anant Nar	SS(UBT)	77,044	43.32	Manisha Waikar	SHS	75,503	42.53	1,541
Mumbai Suburban	159	Dindoshi	Sunil Prabhu	SS(UBT)	76,437	43.03	Sanjay Nirupam	SHS	70,255	39.55	6,182
Mumbai Suburban	160	Kandivali East	Atul Bhatkhalkar	BJP	1,14,203	72.39	Kalu Budhelia	INC	30,610	19.40	83,593
Mumbai Suburban	161	Charkop	Yogesh Sagar	BJP	1,27,355	69.44	Yashwant Singh	INC	36,201	19.74	91,154
Mumbai Suburban	162	Malad West	Aslam Shaikh	INC	98,202	49.81	Vinod Shelar	BJP	91,975	46.65	6,227
Mumbai Suburban	163	Goregaon	Vidya Thakur	BJP	96,364	52.39	Sameer Desai	SS(UBT)	72,764	39.56	23,600
Mumbai Suburban	164	Versova	Haroon Rashid Khan	SS(UBT)	65,396	44.21	Bharati Lavekar	BJP	63,796	43.13	1,600
Mumbai Suburban	165	Andheri West	Ameet Satam	BJP	84,981	54.75	Ashok Jadhav	INC	65,382	42.12	19,599
Mumbai Suburban	166	Andheri East	Murji Patel	SHS	94,010	55.66	Rutuja Latke	SS(UBT)	68,524	40.57	25,486
Mumbai Suburban	167	Vile Parle	Parag Alavani	BJP	97,259	61.70	Sandeep Raju Naik	SS(UBT)	42,324	26.85	54,935
Mumbai Suburban	168	Chandivali	Dilip Lande	SHS	1,24,641	51.90	Naseem Khan	INC	1,04,016	43.31	20,625
Mumbai Suburban	169	Ghatkopar West	Ram Kadam	BJP	73,171	43.75	Sanjay Bhalerao	SS(UBT)	60,200	35.99	12,971
Mumbai Suburban	170	Ghatkopar East	Parag Shah	BJP	85,388	57.12	Rakhee Jadhav	NCP-SP	50,389	33.71	34,999
Mumbai Suburban	171	Mankhurd Shivaji Nagar	Abu Azmi	SP	54,780	31.38	Atique Ahmad Khan	AIMIM	42,027	24.07	12,753
Mumbai Suburban	172	Anushakti Nagar	Sana Malik	NCP	49,341	33.78	Fahad Ahmad	NCP-SP	45,963	31.47	3,378
Mumbai Suburban	173	Chembur	Tukaram Kate	SHS	63,194	44.18	Prakash Phaterpekar	SS(UBT)	52,483	36.69	10,711
Mumbai Suburban	174	Kurla (SC)	Mangesh Kudalkar	SHS	72,763	46.56	Praveena Morajkar	SS(UBT)	68,576	43.88	4,187
Mumbai Suburban	175	Kalina	Sanjay Potnis	SS(UBT)	59,820	46.79	Amarjeet Singh	BJP	54,812	42.87	5,008
Mumbai Suburban	176	Vandre East	Varun Sardesai	SS(UBT)	57,708	42.26	Zeeshan Siddique	NCP	46,343	33.94	11,365
Mumbai Suburban	177	Vandre West	Ashish Shelar	BJP	82,780	55.51	Asif Zakaria	INC	62,849	42.14	19,931
Mumbai City	178	Dharavi (SC)	Jyoti Gaikwad	INC	70,727	53.87	Rajesh Khandare	SHS	47,268	36.00	23,459
Mumbai City	179	Sion Koliwada	R. Tamil Selvan	BJP	73,429	48.25	Ganesh Kumar Yadav	INC	65,534	43.07	7,895
Mumbai City	180	Wadala	Kalidas Kolambkar	BJP	66,800	55.78	Shraddha Jadhav	SS(UBT)	41,827	34.93	24,973
Mumbai City	181	Mahim	Mahesh Sawant	SS(UBT)	50,213	37.31	Sada Sarvankar	SHS	48,897	36.33	1,316
Mumbai City	182	Worli	Aaditya Thackeray	SS(UBT)	63,324	44.19	Milind Deora	SHS	54,523	38.05	8,801
Mumbai City	183	Shivadi	Ajay Choudhari	SS(UBT)	74,890	48.72	Bala Nandgaonkar	MNS	67,750	44.08	7,140
Mumbai City	184	Byculla	Manoj Jamsutkar	SS(UBT)	80,133	58.09	Yamini Jadhav	SHS	48,772	35.36	31,361
Mumbai City	185	Malabar Hill	Mangal Lodha	BJP	1,01,197	73.38	Bherulal Choudhary	SS(UBT)	33,178	24.06	68,019
Mumbai City	186	Mumbadevi	Amin Patel	INC	74,990	63.34	Shaina NC	SHS	40,146	33.91	34,844
Mumbai City	187	Colaba	Rahul Narwekar	BJP	81,085	68.49	Heera Nawaji Devasi	INC	32,504	27.46	48,581
Raigad	188	Panvel	Prashant Thakur	BJP	1,83,931	47.90	Balaram Patil	PWPI	1,32,840	34.60	51,091
Raigad	189	Karjat	Mahendra Thorve	SHS	94,871	39.53	Sudhakar Ghare	IND	89,177	37.16	5,694
Raigad	190	Uran	Mahesh Baldi	BJP	95,390	36.19	Pritam Mhatre	PWPI	88,878	33.72	6,512
Raigad	191	Pen	Ravisheth Patil	BJP	1,24,631	55.02	Prasad Dada Bhoir	SS(UBT)	63,821	28.17	60,810
Raigad	192	Alibag	Mahendra Dalvi	SHS	1,13,599	47.73	Chitralekha Patil	PWPI	84,034	35.31	29,565
Raigad	193	Shrivardhan	Aditi Tatkare	NCP	1,16,050	70.79	Anil Navghane	NCP-SP	33,252	20.28	82,798
Raigad	194	Mahad	Bharatshet Gogawale	SHS	1,17,442	55.05	Snehal Jagtap	SS(UBT)	91,232	42.77	26,210
Pune	195	Junnar	Sharaddada Sonavane	IND	73,355	32.43	Satyashil Sherkar	NCP-SP	66,691	29.48	6,664
Pune	196	Ambegaon	Dilip Walse Patil	NCP	106,888	48.04	Devdutt Nikkam	NCP-SP	105,365	47.35	1,523
Pune	197	Khed Alandi	Babaji Kale	SS(UBT)	1,50,152	57.88	Dilip Mohite	NCP	98,409	37.94	51,743
Pune	198	Shirur	Dnyaneshwar Katke	NCP	1,92,281	59.88	Ashok Pawar	NCP-SP	1,17,731	36.67	74,550
Pune	199	Daund	Rahul Kul	BJP	1,20,721	51.00	Rameshappa Thorat	NCP-SP	106,832	45.14	13,889
Pune	200	Indapur	Dattatray Bharne	NCP	1,17,236	44.24	Harshvardhan Patil	NCP-SP	97,826	36.92	19,410
Pune	201	Baramati	Ajit Pawar	NCP	1,81,132	66.13	Yugendra Pawar	NCP-SP	80,233	29.29	100,899
Pune	202	Purandar	Vijay Shivtare	SHS	1,25,819	44.20	Sanjay Jagtap	INC	1,01,631	35.71	24,188
Pune	203	Bhor	Shankar Mandekar	NCP	1,26,455	43.23	Sangram Thopate	INC	1,06,817	36.51	19,638
Pune	204	Maval	Sunil Shelke	NCP	1,91,255	68.53	Bapu Bhegade	IND	82,690	29.63	1,08,565
Pune	205	Chinchwad	Shankar Jagtap	BJP	2,35,323	60.51	Rahul Kalate	NCP-SP	1,31,458	33.80	1,03,865
Pune	206	Pimpri (SC)	Anna Bansode	NCP	1,09,239	53.71	Sulakshana Dhar	NCP-SP	72,575	35.68	36,664
Pune	207	Bhosari	Mahesh Landge	BJP	2,13,624	56.91	Ajit Gavhane	NCP-SP	1,49,859	39.92	63,765
Pune	208	Vadgaon Sheri	Bapusaheb Pathare	NCP-SP	1,33,689	47.07	Sunil Tingre	NCP	1,28,979	45.41	4,710
Pune	209	Shivajinagar	Siddharth Shirole	BJP	84,695	55.24	Bahirat Datta	INC	47,993	31.30	36,702
Pune	210	Kothrud	Chandrakant Patil	BJP	1,59,234	68.40	Chandrakant Mokate	SS(UBT)	47,193	20.27	1,12,041
Pune	211	Khadakwasala	Bhimrao Tapkir	BJP	1,63,131	49.94	Sachin Dodke	NCP-SP	1,10,809	33.92	52,322
Pune	212	Parvati	Madhuri Misal	BJP	1,18,193	58.15	Ashwini Kadam	NCP-SP	63,533	31.26	54,660
Pune	213	Hadapsar	Chetan Tupe	NCP	1,34,810	42.46	Prashant Jagtap	NCP-SP	1,27,688	40.22	7,122
Pune	214	Pune Cantonment (SC)	Sunil Kamble	BJP	76,032	48.44	Ramesh Bagwe	INC	65,712	41.86	10,320
Pune	215	Kasba Peth	Hemant Rasane	BJP	90,046	53.41	Ravindra Dhangekar	INC	70,623	41.89	19,423
Ahilyanagar	216	Akole (ST)	Kiran Lahamate	NCP	73,958	37.85	Amit Bhangare	NCP-SP	68,402	35.00	5,556
Ahilyanagar	217	Sangamner	Amol Khatal	SHS	1,12,386	50.95	Balasaheb Thorat	INC	1,01,826	46.16	10,560
Ahilyanagar	218	Shirdi	Radhakrishna Vikhe Patil	BJP	1,44,778	64.79	Prabhavati Ghogare	INC	74,496	33.34	70,282
Ahilyanagar	219	Kopargaon	Ashutosh Kale	NCP	1,61,147	77.46	Sandeep Varpe	NCP-SP	36,523	17.55	1,24,624
Ahilyanagar	220	Shrirampur (SC)	Hemant Ogale	INC	66,099	30.22	Bhausaheb Kamble	SHS	52,726	24.10	13,373
Ahilyanagar	221	Nevasa	Vitthal Langhe	SHS	95,444	41.91	Shankarrao Gadakh	SS(UBT)	91,423	40.15	4,021
Ahilyanagar	222	Shevgaon	Monika Rajale	BJP	99,775	37.92	Prataprao Dhakne	NCP-SP	80,732	30.68	19,043
Ahilyanagar	223	Rahuri	Shivaji Kardile	BJP	1,35,859	55.73	Prajakt Tanpure	NCP-SP	1,01,372	41.58	34,487
Ahilyanagar	224	Parner	Kashinath Date	NCP	1,13,630	45.65	Rani Nilesh Lanke	NCP-SP	1,12,104	45.03	1,526
Ahilyanagar	225	Ahmednagar City	Sangram Jagtap	NCP	1,18,636	58.12	Abhishek Kalamkar	NCP-SP	79,018	38.71	39,618
Ahilyanagar	226	Shrigonda	Vikram Pachpute	BJP	99,820	39.41	Rahul Jagtap	IND	62,664	24.74	37,156
Ahilyanagar	227	Karjat Jamkhed	Rohit Pawar	NCP-SP	1,27,676	48.54	Ram Shinde	BJP	1,26,433	48.06	1,243
Beed	228	Georai	Vijaysinh Pandit	NCP	1,16,141	41.74	Badamrao Pandit	SS(UBT)	73,751	26.50	42,390
Beed	229	Majalgaon	Prakashdada Solanke	NCP	66,009	27.62	Mohan Jagtap	NCP-SP	60,110	25.15	5,899
Beed	230	Beed	Sandeep Kshirsagar	NCP-SP	1,01,874	41.97	Yogesh Kshirsagar	NCP	96,550	39.78	5,324
Beed	231	Ashti	Suresh Dhas	BJP	1,40,507	48.99	Bhimrao Dhonde	IND	62,532	21.79	77,975
Beed	232	Kaij (SC)	Namita Mundada	BJP	1,17,081	47.08	Pruthviraj Sathe	NCP-SP	1,14,394	46.00	2,687
Beed	233	Parli	Dhananjay Munde	NCP	1,94,889	75.97	Rajesaheb Deshmukh	NCP-SP	54,665	21.31	1,40,224
Latur	234	Latur Rural	Ramesh Karad	BJP	1,12,051	47.59	Dhiraj Deshmukh	INC	1,05,456	44.79	6,595
Latur	235	Latur City	Amit Deshmukh	INC	1,14,110	45.08	Archana Patil Chakurkar	BJP	1,06,712	42.16	7,398
Latur	236	Ahmedpur	Babasaheb M. Patil	NCP	96,905	40.09	Vinayakrao Jadhav	NCP-SP	65,236	26.99	31,669
Latur	237	Udgir (SC)	Sanjay Bansode	NCP	1,52,038	68.97	Sudhakar Bhalerao	NCP-SP	58,824	26.69	93,214
Latur	238	Nilanga	Sambhaji Patil Nilangekar	BJP	1,12,368	50.85	Abhay Salunke	INC	98,628	44.63	13,740
Latur	239	Ausa	Abhimanyu Pawar	BJP	1,15,590	54.70	Dinkar Mane	SS(UBT)	82,128	38.87	33,462
Dharashiv	240	Umarga (SC)	Pravin Swami	SS(UBT)	96,206	48.64	Dnyanraj Chougule	SHS	92,241	46.64	3,965
Dharashiv	241	Tuljapur	Ranajagjitsinha Patil	BJP	1,31,863	50.82	Dhiraj Kadam Patil	INC	94,984	36.60	36,879
Dharashiv	242	Osmanabad	Kailas Patil	SS(UBT)	1,30,573	53.73	Ajit Pingle	SHS	94,007	38.69	36,566
Dharashiv	243	Paranda	Tanaji Sawant	SHS	1,03,254	44.18	Rahul Mote	NCP-SP	1,01,745	43.53	1,509
Solapur	244	Karmala	Narayan Patil	NCP-SP	96,091	41.54	Sanjaymama Shinde	IND	80,006	34.59	16,085
Solapur	245	Madha	Abhijeet Patil	NCP-SP	1,36,559	50.73	Ranjit Shinde	IND	1,05,938	39.35	30,621
Solapur	246	Barshi	Dilip Sopal	SS(UBT)	1,22,694	49.07	Rajendra Raut	SHS	1,16,222	46.48	6,472
Solapur	247	Mohol (SC)	Raju Khare	NCP-SP	1,25,838	54.06	Yashwant Mane	NCP	95,636	41.08	30,202
Solapur	248	Solapur City North	Vijay Deshmukh	BJP	117,215	60.89	Mahesh Kothe	NCP-SP	62,632	32.54	54,583
Solapur	249	Solapur City Central	Devendra Kothe	BJP	110,278	54.71	Farooq Makbool Shabdi	AIMIM	61,428	30.48	48,850
Solapur	250	Akkalkot	Sachin Kalyanshetti	BJP	1,48,105	57.63	Siddharam Mhetre	INC	98,533	38.34	49,572
Solapur	251	Solapur South	Subhash Deshmukh	BJP	1,16,932	51.75	Amar Ratikant Patil	SS(UBT)	39,805	17.62	77,127
Solapur	252	Pandharpur	Samadhan Autade	BJP	1,25,163	47.71	Bhagirath Bhalake	INC	1,16,733	44.49	8,430
Solapur	253	Sangola	Babasaheb Deshmukh	PWPI	116,256	44.09	Shahajibapu Patil	SHS	90,870	34.46	25,386
Solapur	254	Malshiras (SC)	Uttamrao Jankar	NCP-SP	1,21,713	50.12	Ram Satpute	BJP	1,08,566	44.70	13,147
Satara	255	Phaltan (SC)	Sachin Patil	NCP	1,19,287	48.77	Dipak Chavan	NCP-SP	1,02,241	41.80	17,046
Satara	256	Wai	Makrand Jadhav - Patil	NCP	1,40,971	59.52	Arunadevi Pisal	NCP-SP	79,579	33.60	61,392
Satara	257	Koregaon	Mahesh Shinde	SHS	1,46,166	57.94	Shashikant Shinde	NCP-SP	1,01,103	40.08	45,063
Satara	258	Man	Jaykumar Gore	BJP	1,50,021	57.01	Prabhakar Gharge	NCP-SP	1,00,346	38.13	49,675
Satara	259	Karad North	Manoj Ghorpade	BJP	1,34,626	58.21	Shamrao Pandurang Patil	NCP-SP	90,935	39.32	43,691
Satara	260	Karad South	Atulbaba Bhosale	BJP	1,39,505	57.39	Prithviraj Chavan	INC	1,00,150	41.20	39,355
Satara	261	Patan	Shambhuraj Desai	SHS	1,25,759	54.33	Satyajit Patankar	IND	90,935	39.28	34,824
Satara	262	Satara	Shivendra Raje Bhosale	BJP	1,76,849	80.36	Amit Genuji Kadam	SS(UBT)	34,725	15.78	1,42,124
Ratnagiri	263	Dapoli	Yogesh Kadam	SHS	1,05,007	53.32	Sanjay Kadam	SS(UBT)	80,914	41.09	24,093
Ratnagiri	264	Guhagar	Bhaskar Jadhav	SS(UBT)	71,241	47.03	Rajesh Bendal	SHS	68,411	45.16	2,830
Ratnagiri	265	Chiplun	Shekhar Nikam	NCP	96,555	50.15	Prashant Baban Yadav	NCP-SP	89,688	46.58	6,867
Ratnagiri	266	Ratnagiri	Uday Samant	SHS	1,11,335	59.35	Bal Mane	SS(UBT)	69,745	37.18	41,590
Ratnagiri	267	Rajapur	Kiran Samant	SHS	80,256	51.91	Rajan Salvi	SS(UBT)	60,579	39.18	19,677
Sindhudurg	268	Kankavli	Nitesh Rane	BJP	1,08,369	66.43	Sandesh Parkar	SS(UBT)	50,362	30.87	58,007
Sindhudurg	269	Kudal	Nilesh Rane	SHS	81,659	51.41	Vaibhav Naik	SS(UBT)	73,483	46.26	8,176
Sindhudurg	270	Sawantwadi	Deepak Kesarkar	SHS	81,008	48.77	Rajan Teli	SS(UBT)	41,109	24.75	39,899
Kolhapur	271	Chandgad	Shivaji Patil	IND	84,254	33.96	Rajesh Patil	NCP	60,120	24.24	24,134
Kolhapur	272	Radhanagari	Prakashrao Abitkar	SHS	1,44,359	52.87	Krishnarao Patil	SS(UBT)	106,100	38.86	38,259
Kolhapur	273	Kagal	Hasan Mushrif	NCP	1,45,269	50.65	Samarjeetsinh Ghatge	NCP-SP	1,33,688	46.61	11,581
Kolhapur	274	Kolhapur South	Amal Mahadik	BJP	1,48,892	52.37	Ruturaj Patil	INC	1,31,262	46.17	17,630
Kolhapur	275	Karvir	Chandradip Narke	SHS	1,34,528	48.25	Rahul Sadolikar	INC	1,32,552	47.54	1,976
Kolhapur	276	Kolhapur North	Rajesh Kshirsagar	SHS	1,11,085	55.80	Rajesh Latkar	IND	81,522	40.95	29,563
Kolhapur	277	Shahuwadi	Vinay Kore	JSS	1,36,064	55.68	Satyajit Patil	SS(UBT)	1,00,011	40.93	36,053
Kolhapur	278	Hatkanangle (SC)	Ashokrao Mane	JSS	1,34,191	51.08	Raju Awale	INC	87,942	33.47	46,249
Kolhapur	279	Ichalkaranji	Rahul Awade	BJP	1,31,919	60.27	Madan Karande	NCP-SP	75,108	34.31	56,811
Kolhapur	280	Shirol	Rajendra Patil Yadravkar	RSVA	1,34,630	51.95	Ganpatrao Patil	INC	93,814	36.20	40,816
Sangli	281	Miraj (SC)	Suresh Khade	BJP	1,29,766	56.70	Tanaji Satpute	SS(UBT)	84,571	36.95	45,195
Sangli	282	Sangli	Sudhir Gadgil	BJP	1,12,498	49.76	Prithviraj Patil	INC	76,363	33.78	36,135
Sangli	283	Islampur	Jayant Patil	NCP-SP	1,30,738	51.72	Nishikant Bhosale Patil	NCP	1,08,049	45.59	13,027
Sangli	284	Shirala	Satyajit Deshmukh	BJP	1,30,738	53.61	Mansing Naik	NCP-SP	1,08,049	44.31	22,689
Sangli	285	Palus-Kadegaon	Vishwajeet Kadam	INC	1,30,769	55.88	Sangram Deshmukh	BJP	1,00,705	43.03	30,064
Sangli	286	Khanapur	Suhas Babar	SHS	1,53,892	61.14	Vaibhav Patil	NCP-SP	75,711	30.08	78,181
Sangli	287	Tasgaon	Rohit Patil	NCP-SP	1,28,403	54.09	Sanjaykaka Patil	NCP	1,00,759	42.45	27,644
Sangli	288	Jath	Gopichand Padalkar	BJP	1,13,737	53.39	Vikramsinh Sawant	INC	75,497	35.44	38,240

=== Seat shifts and retentions ===
Party	Seats Retained	Seats Lost	Seats Gained	Final Count
BJP	98	7	34	132
SHS	35	6	22	57
NCP	34	8	7	41
SS(UBT)	9	6	11	20
INC	13	32	3	16
NCP(SP)	5	6	5	10
CPI(M)	1	0	0	1
JSS	1	0	1	2
SP	2	0	0	2
RSPS	1	0	0	1
RVSP	1	0	0	1
RSVA	0	0	1	1
PWPI	0	1	1	1
AIMIM	1	1	0	1

== Reactions ==
On 23 November Prime Minister Narendra Modi reacted to the BJP-led Mahayuti's landslide Maharashtra election victory, emphasizing development, good governance, and unity. He thanked the people of Maharashtra for their historic mandate and praised party workers for their hard work. The BJP named Devendra Fadnavis as Maharashtra's Chief Minister after their victory with over 230 seats. Fadnavis thanked party leaders, allies, and voters, attributing the success of the elections to Modi.

== Bypolls (2024–2029) ==
Date	Constituency		Previous MLA		Reason	Elected MLA	
23 April 2026	201	Baramati	Ajit Pawar	Nationalist Congress Party	Died on 28 January 2026	Sunetra Pawar	Nationalist Congress Party
23 April 2026	223	Rahuri	Shivaji Kardile	Bharatiya Janata Party	Died on 17 October 2025	Akshay Shivajirao Kardile	Bharatiya Janata Party

== See also ==
- 2024 elections in India
- Elections in Maharashtra
- 2024 Indian general election in Maharashtra
