= Sulbha Gaikwad =

Indian politician

Sulbha Ganpat Gaikwad (born 1971) is an Indian politician from Maharashtra. She is an MLA from Kalyan East Assembly constituency in Thane District. She won the 2024 Maharashtra Legislative Assembly election, representing the Bharatiya Janata Party.

== Early life and education ==
Gaikwad is from Kalyan, Thane District, Maharashtra. She married Ganpat Kalu Gaikwad, a three time MLA, who is involved in a criminal case and did not contest the seat in 2024 Assembly election. She passed Class 5 and later discontinued her studies after 1985 while in Class 7 at Mahatma Gandhi Vidya Mandir, Dombivli, Thane.

== Career ==
Gaikwad won from Kalyan East Assembly constituency representing Bharatiya Janata Party in the 2024 Maharashtra Legislative Assembly election. She polled 81,516 votes and defeated her nearest rival, Mahesh Dashrath Gaikwad, an independent politician, by a margin of 26,408 votes. Her husband Ganpat Gaikwad was the sitting MLA and won thrice from the constituency.
