= Devayani Farande =

Indian politician

Prof. Devyani Suhas Pharande is an Indian politician and member of the Bharatiya Janata Party. Farande is a member of the Maharashtra Legislative Assembly from the Nashik Central constituency in Nashik district and was elected to the seat in 2014 Maharashtra Legislative Assembly election and 2019 Maharashtra Legislative Assembly election. She was almost denied a ticket to contest in the 2024 Maharashtra Legislative Assembly election and put on a waiting list before being given the ticket at the final moment.

In July 2024, her name had surfaced in a case about a scammer, that she was one of the people duped into giving money. In 2021, she had demanded action against Uddhav Thackeray for making comments against Yogi Adityanath which she claimed was "unacceptable".

== Electoral record ==
Election	Year	Constituency	Result	Votes	% Votes	Source
2014 Maharashtra Legislative Assembly election	2014	Nashik Central constituency	Won	61,548	38.63%	
2019 Maharashtra Legislative Assembly election	2019	Nashik Central constituency	Won	61,000	38.00%	
