= Rajesh More =

Indian politician

Rajesh Govardhan More (born 1969) is an Indian politician from Maharashtra. He is an MLA from Kalyan Rural Assembly constituency in Thane district. He won the 2024 Maharashtra Legislative Assembly election representing the Shiv Sena Party (Shinde faction).

== Early life and education ==
More is from Kalyan, Thane district, Maharashtra. He is the son of Govardhan Ghuttya More. He completed his BA in 2021 at Yashwantrao Chavan Maharashtra Open University, Nasik. He is in the transport business, and his wife also runs the family business.

== Career ==
More won from Kalyan Rural Assembly constituency representing Shiv Sena in the 2024 Maharashtra Legislative Assembly election. He polled 141,164 votes and defeated his nearest rival, Pramod Ratan Patil of the Maharashtra Navnirman Sena, by a margin of 66,396 votes.
