= Kalyan Rural Assembly constituency =

Constituency of the Maharashtra legislative assembly in India

Coordinates: 19.182°N 73.101°E

Kalyan Rural
- Constituency No. 144 for the Maharashtra Legislative Assembly

Constituency details
- Country: India
- Region: Western India
- State: Maharashtra
- District: Thane
- Lok Sabha constituency: Kalyan
- Established: 2008
- Total electors: 510,315
- Reservation: None

Member of Legislative Assembly
- 15th Maharashtra Legislative Assembly
- Incumbent Rajesh Govardhan More
- Party: SHS
- Alliance: NDA
- Elected year: 2024

Kalyan Rural Assembly constituency is one of the 288 Vidhan Sabha (legislative assembly) constituencies of Maharashtra state, western India. This constituency is located in Thane district.

== Geographical scope ==
The constituency comprises parts of Thane taluka that is Ward nos. 6 & 7 of Navi Mumbai Municipal Corporation and Ward nos. 6 & 7 of Thane Municipal Corporation, parts of Kalyan taluka that is ward nos. 31 to 34, 51 to 56, 66, 67 and 69 to 77 of Kalyan Dombivali Municipal Corporation and Nilje and Hedutane sajas of Kalyan revenue circle.

== Members of the Legislative Assembly ==
Year	Member	Party
Until 2008: Constituency did not exist
2009	Ramesh Ratan Patil	Maharashtra Navnirman Sena
2014	Subhash Bhoir	Shiv Sena
2019	Pramod Ratan Patil	Maharashtra Navnirman Sena
2024	Rajesh More	Shiv Sena

== Election results ==
=== Assembly Election 2024 ===
2024 Maharashtra Legislative Assembly election : Kalyan Rural
Party	Candidate	Votes	%	±%
SS	Rajesh Govardhan More	141,164	48.13	▲2.89
MNS	Pramod Ratan Patil	74,768	25.49	▼23.47
SS(UBT)	Subhash Bhoir	70,062	23.89	New
VBA	Vikas Prakash Ingle	3,330	1.14	▼2.10
NOTA	None of the Above	2,734	0.93	▼2.24
Margin of victory		66,396	22.64	▲18.91
Turnout		2,96,039	58.01	▲12.34
Total valid votes		2,93,305		
Registered electors		5,10,315		▲20.08
SS gain from MNS		Swing	▼0.84	

=== Assembly Election 2019 ===
2019 Maharashtra Legislative Assembly election : Kalyan Rural
Party	Candidate	Votes	%	±%
MNS	Pramod Ratan Patil	93,927	48.97	▲23.98
SS	Mhatre Ramesh Sukrya	86,773	45.24	▼7.44
VBA	Amol Dhanraj Kendre	6,199	3.23	New
NOTA	None of the Above	6,092	3.18	▼1.73
Independent	Shiva Krishnamurthy Iyer	1,156	0.60	New
Margin of victory		7,154	3.73	▼23.96
Turnout		1,97,939	46.58	▼0.58
Total valid votes		1,91,822		
Registered electors		4,24,976		▲21.68
MNS gain from SS		Swing	▼3.71	

=== Assembly Election 2014 ===
2014 Maharashtra Legislative Assembly election : Kalyan Rural
Party	Candidate	Votes	%	±%
SS	Subhash Bhoir	84,110	52.68	▲19.00
MNS	Ramesh Ratan Patil	39,898	24.99	▼16.38
NCP	Vandarsheth Pundlik Patil	19,783	12.39	New
INC	Patil Sharda Ram	9,213	5.77	▼15.70
NOTA	None of the Above	7,835	4.91	New
BSP	Pagare Bharati Rajendra	2,511	1.57	▲0.57
Independent	Rohidas Bama Munde	1,401	0.88	New
Margin of victory		44,212	27.69	▲20.00
Turnout		1,67,507	47.96	▼1.45
Total valid votes		1,59,661		
Registered electors		3,49,261		▲33.25
SS gain from MNS		Swing	▲11.31	

=== Assembly Election 2009 ===
2009 Maharashtra Legislative Assembly election : Kalyan Rural
Party	Candidate	Votes	%	±%
MNS	Ramesh Ratan Patil	51,149	41.37	New
SS	Mhatre Ramesh Sukarya	41,642	33.68	New
INC	Ravi Patil	26,546	21.47	New
BSP	Wankhede Maruti Sukhaji	1,237	1.00	New
Independent	Vidyachandra Digambar Dixit	994	0.80	New
Independent	Rajkant Parshuram Patil	870	0.70	New
Margin of victory		9,507	7.69	
Turnout		1,23,633	47.17	
Total valid votes		1,23,633		
Registered electors		2,62,111		
MNS win (new seat)				
