= Kalyan East Assembly constituency =

Constituency of the Maharashtra legislative assembly in India

Coordinates: 19.222°N 73.124°E

Kalyan East
- Constituency No. 142 for the Maharashtra Legislative Assembly

Constituency details
- Country: India
- Region: Western India
- State: Maharashtra
- District: Thane
- Lok Sabha constituency: Kalyan
- Established: 2008
- Total electors: 329,306
- Reservation: None

Member of Legislative Assembly
- 15th Maharashtra Legislative Assembly
- Incumbent Sulbha Gaikwad
- Party: Bharatiya Janata Party
- Elected year: 2024

Kalyan East Assembly constituency is one of the 288 Vidhan Sabha (legislative assembly) constituencies of Maharashtra state, western India. This constituency is located in Thane district.

== Geographical scope ==
The constituency comprises parts of Kalyan taluka that is ward No. 13 to 30 of Kalyan Dombivali Municipal Corporation, parts of Ambernath taluka viz. revenue circle Kumbharli, parts of Ulhasnagar taluka viz. Ward No. 23 to 26, 43, and 52 to 55 of Ulhasnagar Municipal Corporation.

== Members of Legislative Assembly ==
Year	Member	Party
Until 2008: Constituency did not exist
2009	Ganpat Gaikwad	Independent
2014	Ganpat Gaikwad	Independent
2019	Ganpat Gaikwad	Bharatiya Janata Party
2024	Sulbha Gaikwad	Bharatiya Janata Party

== Election results ==
=== Assembly Election 2024 ===
2024 Maharashtra Legislative Assembly election : Kalyan East
Party	Candidate	Votes	%	±%
BJP	Sulbha Ganpat Gaikwad	81,516	42.56%	▲1.62
Independent	Mahesh Dashrath Gaikwad	55,108	28.77%	New
SS(UBT)	Dhananjay Baburao Bodare	39,512	20.63%	New
VBA	Vishal Vishnu Pawshe	9,340	4.88%	▼3.88
NOTA	None of the Above	1,872	0.98%	▼1.53
Margin of victory		26,408	13.79%	▲5.47
Turnout		1,93,392	58.73%	▲15.54
Total valid votes		1,91,520		
Registered electors		3,29,306		▼4.77
BJP hold		Swing	▲1.62	

=== Assembly Election 2019 ===
2019 Maharashtra Legislative Assembly election : Kalyan East
Party	Candidate	Votes	%	±%
BJP	Ganpat Kalu Gaikwad	60,332	40.94%	▲20.74
Independent	Dhananjay Baburao Bodare	48,075	32.62%	New
NCP	Prakash Balkrushna Tare	16,757	11.37%	▼2.58
VBA	Ashwini Vinayak Thorat-Dhumal	12,899	8.75%	New
NOTA	None of the Above	3,690	2.50%	▲0.54
Independent	Shailesh Rammurti Tiwari	2,014	1.37%	New
BSP	Milind Chandrakant Belamkar	1,281	0.87%	▼1.49
PHJSP	Adv. Uday Rasal	1,002	0.68%	New
Margin of victory		12,257	8.32%	▲7.78
Turnout		1,51,109	43.70%	▼1.74
Total valid votes		1,47,372		
Registered electors		3,45,802		▲10.60
BJP gain from Independent		Swing	▲14.72	

=== Assembly Election 2014 ===
2014 Maharashtra Legislative Assembly election : Kalyan East
Party	Candidate	Votes	%	±%
Independent	Ganpat Kalu Gaikwad	36,357	26.22%	New
SS	Gopal Ramchandra Landge	35,612	25.68%	▼3.58
BJP	Vishal Vishnu Pawshe	28,004	20.19%	New
NCP	Nilesh Shivaji Shinde	19,346	13.95%	New
MNS	Nitin Maharu Nikam	7,485	5.40%	New
INC	Vijayprakash Sarjuprasad Mishra	6,526	4.71%	▼7.56
BSP	Belamkar Milind Chandrakant	3,270	2.36%	▲0.03
NOTA	None of the Above	2,720	1.96%	New
Margin of victory		745	0.54%	▼19.31
Turnout		1,41,417	45.23%	▼1.56
Total valid votes		1,38,677		
Registered electors		3,12,659		▲16.34
Independent hold		Swing	▼22.88	

=== Assembly Election 2009 ===
2009 Maharashtra Legislative Assembly election : Kalyan East
Party	Candidate	Votes	%	±%
Independent	Ganpat Kalu Gaikwad	60,592	49.10%	New
SS	Pundlik Balu Mhatre	36,106	29.26%	New
INC	Dr. R. B. Singh	15,140	12.27%	New
RJP	Belamkar Milind Chandrakant	5,172	4.19%	New
BSP	Owhal Rambhau Bhau	2,867	2.32%	New
RSPS	Rokade Pralhad Sahadu	1,843	1.49%	New
Margin of victory		24,486	19.84%	
Turnout		1,23,445	45.93%	
Total valid votes		1,23,401		
Registered electors		2,68,743		
Independent win (new seat)				
