= Nashik West Assembly constituency =

Constituency of the Maharashtra legislative assembly in India

Coordinates: 19.99°N 73.73°E

Nashik West
- Constituency No. 125 for the Maharashtra Legislative Assembly

Constituency details
- Country: India
- Region: Western India
- State: Maharashtra
- District: Nashik
- Lok Sabha constituency: Nashik
- Established: 2008
- Total electors: 483,719
- Reservation: None

Member of Legislative Assembly
- 15th Maharashtra Legislative Assembly
- Incumbent Seema Mahesh Hiray
- Party: BJP
- Elected year: 2024

Nashik West Assembly constituency is one of the 288 Vidhan Sabha (legislative assembly) constituencies of Maharashtra state, western India. This constituency is located in Nashik district. It is one of the six assembly segments under Nashik Lok Sabha constituency.

== Geographical scope ==
The constituency comprises parts of Nashik taluka that come under the Nashik Municipal Corporation viz. ward nos. 21 to 26 and 45 to 60.

== Members of the Legislative Assembly ==
Year	Member	Party
Till 2009 : Constituency did not exist
2009	Nitin Bhosale	Maharashtra Navnirman Sena
2014	Seema Hiray	Bharatiya Janata Party
2019	Seema Hiray	Bharatiya Janata Party
2024	Seema Hiray	Bharatiya Janata Party

== Election results ==
=== Assembly Election 2024 ===
2024 Maharashtra Legislative Assembly election : Nashik West
Party	Candidate	Votes	%	±%
BJP	Seema Mahesh Hiray	141,725	51.61	▲15.62
SS(UBT)	Badgujar Sudhakar (Bhau) Bhika	73,548	26.78	New
MNS	Dinkar Dharma Patil	46,649	16.99	▲5.23
VBA	Amol Anant Chandramore	7,862	2.86	New
NOTA	None of the Above	1,811	0.66	▼0.32
Margin of victory		68,177	24.83	▲20.33
Turnout		276,414	57.14	▲2.81
Total valid votes		274,603		
Registered electors		483,719		▲20.39
BJP hold		Swing	▲15.62	

=== Assembly Election 2019 ===
2019 Maharashtra Legislative Assembly election : Nashik West
Party	Candidate	Votes	%	±%
BJP	Seema Mahesh Hiray	78,041	35.99	▲1.64
NCP	Dr. Apoorva Prashant Hiray	68,295	31.50	▲16.11
MNS	Dilip Dattu Datir	25,501	11.76	▲7.33
CPI(M)	Dhondiram Limbaji Karad	22,657	10.45	▲1.86
Independent	Vilas Ramdas Shinde	16,429	7.58	New
Independent	Bipin Annasaheb Katare	2,270	1.05	New
NOTA	None of the Above	2,118	0.98	▲0.28
Margin of victory		9,746	4.49	▼10.61
Turnout		218,947	54.49	▼4.56
Total valid votes		216,821		
Registered electors		401,795		▲19.71
BJP hold		Swing	▲1.64	

=== Assembly Election 2014 ===
2014 Maharashtra Legislative Assembly election : Nashik West
Party	Candidate	Votes	%	±%
BJP	Seema Mahesh Hiray	67,489	34.36	▲24.94
SS	Badgujar Sudhakar Bhika	37,819	19.25	New
NCP	Shivaji(Appa) Pandurang Chumbhale	30,236	15.39	▼3.24
INC	Dashrath Dharmaji Patil	21,981	11.19	New
CPI(M)	Dr. D.L. Karad	16,870	8.59	▼3.88
MNS	Bhosale Nitin Keshavrao	8,712	4.43	▼30.59
Independent	D.G.Suryawanshi	7,390	3.76	New
NOTA	None of the Above	1,375	0.70	New
Margin of victory		29,670	15.10	▼1.29
Turnout		197,867	58.95	▲8.80
Total valid votes		196,445		
Registered electors		335,649		▲10.61
BJP gain from MNS		Swing	▼0.67	

=== Assembly Election 2009 ===
2009 Maharashtra Legislative Assembly election : Nashik West
Party	Candidate	Votes	%	±%
MNS	Bhosale Nitin Keshavrao	52,855	35.03	New
NCP	Nana Mahale	28,117	18.63	New
Independent	Patil Dasharath Dharmaji	19,734	13.08	New
CPI(M)	Karad Dhondiram Limbaji	18,812	12.47	New
BJP	Aher Rahul Daulatrao	14,206	9.41	New
Independent	Badgujar Sudhakar (Bhau) Bhika	8,328	5.52	New
Independent	Londhe Prakash Mogal	4,926	3.26	New
Margin of victory		24,738	16.39	
Turnout		150,926	49.74	
Total valid votes		150,889		
Registered electors		303,445		
MNS win (new seat)				
