= Nashik Central Assembly constituency =

Constituency of the Maharashtra legislative assembly in India

Coordinates: 19°59′27.98″N 73°43′15.88″E

Nashik Central
- Constituency No. 124 for the Maharashtra Legislative Assembly

Constituency details
- Country: India
- Region: Western India
- State: Maharashtra
- District: Nashik
- Lok Sabha constituency: Nashik
- Established: 2008
- Total electors: 345,502
- Reservation: None

Member of Legislative Assembly
- 15th Maharashtra Legislative Assembly
- Incumbent Devayani Farande
- Party: Bharatiya Janata Party
- Elected year: 2024

Nashik Central Assembly constituency is one of the 288 Vidhan Sabha (Assembly) constituencies of Maharashtra state in Western India. It is one of the six assembly segments under Nashik Lok Sabha constituency. As of 2019, its representative is Devayani Farande of the Bharatiya Janata Party.

== Members of the Legislative Assembly ==
Year	Member	Party
Till 2009 : Constituency did not exist
2009	Vasantrao Gite	Maharashtra Navnirman Sena
2014	Devyani Suhas Pharande	Bharatiya Janata Party
2019	Devyani Suhas Pharande	Bharatiya Janata Party
2024	Devyani Suhas Pharande	Bharatiya Janata Party

== Election results ==
=== Assembly Election 2024 ===
2024 Maharashtra Legislative Assembly election : Nashik Central
Party	Candidate	Votes	%	±%
BJP	Devyani Suhas Pharande	105,689	53.11	▲5.04
SS(UBT)	Vasantrao Gite	87,833	44.14	New
VBA	Mushir Muniroddin Sayed	3,080	1.55	▼4.45
NOTA	None of the Above	1,660	0.83	▼0.80
Margin of victory		17,856	8.97	▼9.61
Turnout		200,659	58.08	▲9.78
Total valid votes		198,999		
Registered electors		345,502		▲8.12
BJP hold		Swing	▲5.04	

=== Assembly Election 2019 ===
2019 Maharashtra Legislative Assembly election : Nashik Central
Party	Candidate	Votes	%	±%
BJP	Devyani Suhas Pharande	73,460	48.07	▲9.44
INC	Hemlata Ninad Patil	45,062	29.49	▲12.92
MNS	Bhosale Nitin Keshavrao	22,140	14.49	▼6.40
VBA	Sanjay Bharat Sabale	9,163	6.00	New
NOTA	None of the Above	2,493	1.63	▲0.75
BSP	Deepak Rangnath Doke	933	0.61	▼0.84
Margin of victory		28,398	18.58	▲0.84
Turnout		155,324	48.60	▼3.63
Total valid votes		152,818		
Registered electors		319,566		▲3.21
BJP hold		Swing	▲9.44	

=== Assembly Election 2014 ===
2014 Maharashtra Legislative Assembly election : Nashik Central
Party	Candidate	Votes	%	±%
BJP	Devyani Suhas Pharande	61,548	38.63	New
MNS	Vasantrao Gite	33,276	20.89	▼25.54
INC	Khaire Shahu Sahadevrao	26,393	16.57	▼6.58
SS	Boraste Ajay Bhaskarrao	24,549	15.41	▼3.10
NCP	Khaire Vinayak(Naiya) Dattatray	7,095	4.45	New
BSP	Tejale Devidas Laxman	2,308	1.45	▲0.30
NOTA	None of the Above	1,401	0.88	New
Independent	Shaikh Imran Dagushaikh	993	0.62	New
Margin of victory		28,272	17.75	▼5.53
Turnout		160,771	51.92	▲4.93
Total valid votes		159,309		
Registered electors		309,633		▲7.56
BJP gain from MNS		Swing	▼7.79	

=== Assembly Election 2009 ===
2009 Maharashtra Legislative Assembly election : Nashik Central
Party	Candidate	Votes	%	±%
MNS	Vasantrao Gite	62,167	46.42	New
INC	Dr. Bachhav Shobha Dinesh	30,998	23.15	New
SS	Bagul Sunil Kisan	24,784	18.51	New
SP	Saiyyad Mushir Munirodin	9,206	6.87	New
Independent	Shafik Harun Chaudhari	3,168	2.37	New
BSP	Kokani Akhtar Gafur	1,538	1.15	New
Margin of victory		31,169	23.28	
Turnout		133,926	46.52	
Total valid votes		133,911		
Registered electors		287,859		
MNS win (new seat)				
