= Vasantrao Gite =

Indian politician

Vasantrao Gite is an Indian politician and member of the Shiv Sena. Gite was a member of the Maharashtra Legislative Assembly from the Nashik Central constituency in Nashik district as a member of Maharashtra Navnirman Sena.
