= Seema Mahesh Hiray =

Indian politician

Member of the Maharashtra Legislative Assembly
- In office 2014–present
- Preceded by: Nitin Bhosale
- Constituency: Nashik West

Corporator Nashik Municipal Corporation
- In office 2012–2018

Personal details
- Born: Nashik, Maharashtra, India
- Party: Bharatiya Janata Party
- Spouse: Mahesh Hiray
- Occupation: Politician
- Website: mahabjp.org

Seema Mahesh Hiray is an Indian politician and member of the Bharatiya Janata Party. She won the Nashik west constituency in the Maharashtra Assembly Election 2014 & 2019.
