= Pramod Ratan Patil =

Indian politician (born 26 September 1973)

Member of Maharashtra Legislative Assembly
- In office 21 October 2019 – 23 November 2024
- Preceded by: Subhash Bhoir
- Succeeded by: Rajesh More
- Constituency: Kalyan Rural

Leader of Legislative Maharashtra Navnirman Sena Maharashtra Legislative Assembly
- In office 1 December 2019 – 23 November 2024
- Governor: Bhagat Singh Koshyari
- Speaker: Rahul Narwekar

General Secretary Maharashtra Navnirman Sena
- Incumbent
- Assumed office 2009
- Leader: Raj Thackeray

Personal details
- Born: 26 September 1973 (age 51); India
- Political party: Maharashtra Navnirman Sena
- Spouse: Yogita Patil
- Children: 1
- Occupation: Businessman

Pramod Ratan Patil (born 26 September 1973), popularly known as Raju Patil, is an Indian politician and leader of Maharashtra Navnirman Sena in the Kalyan-Dombivli region. He is a supporter of MNS Chief Raj Thackeray. He played a major role in the Kalyan-Dombivli Municipal Corporation (KDMC) election in 2010 where the MNS won 29 seats. He was a Member of Thane Zilha Parishad from 2009 to 2012. In the 2019 Maharashtra Legislative Assembly election he was elected to the Kalyan Rural seat.

== Early life ==
His father, Ratanbuva Patil, was a senior Labour leader in Premier Company. His elder brother Ramesh was a member of the Maharashtra Pradesh Congress Committee until 2009 when he switched allegiance to MNS, convincing Raju to join him in active politics. His brother resigned as a member of Thane ZP and contested the Vidhansabha election from Kalyan Rural constituency from MNS. Raju contested the same Thane Zilha Parishad seat and was elected unopposed.

== Political life ==
Thane Zilha Parishad Member, Raj Thackeray appointed Patil as secretary of the MNS Labour union. After the success of the KDMC election the party gave him Marathwada Samparkpramukh responsibility.
