= Ganpat Gaikwad =

Indian politician

Member of Maharashtra Legislative Assembly
- In office 2019–2024
- Constituency: Kalyan East
- In office 2014–2019
- Constituency: Kalyan East
- In office 2009–2014
- Constituency: Kalyan East

Personal details
- Born: kalyan east
- Political party: Bharatiya Janata Party
- Spouse: Sulbha Gaikwad
- Children: Vaibhav Gaikwad; Sayali Gaikwad; Pranav Gaikwad
- Occupation: Politician
- Website: www.ganpatgaikwad.com

Ganpat Gaikwad is an Indian politician and member of Bharatiya Janata Party. Gaikwad is a three term member of the Maharashtra Legislative Assembly representing the Kalyan east constituency. Three times MLA from Kalyan east constituency, since 2009.

== Criminal Charges ==
On 2 February 2024, Gaikwad was arrested for shooting and injuring Shiv Sena (Shinde) faction leader Mahesh Gaikwad over a land dispute inside a police station in Maharashtra’s Ulhasnagar, claiming he had “no regrets". His 2019 assembly election affidavit reveals that Ganpat Gaikwad faces 18 pending criminal cases.
