= Subhash Bhoir =

Indian politician

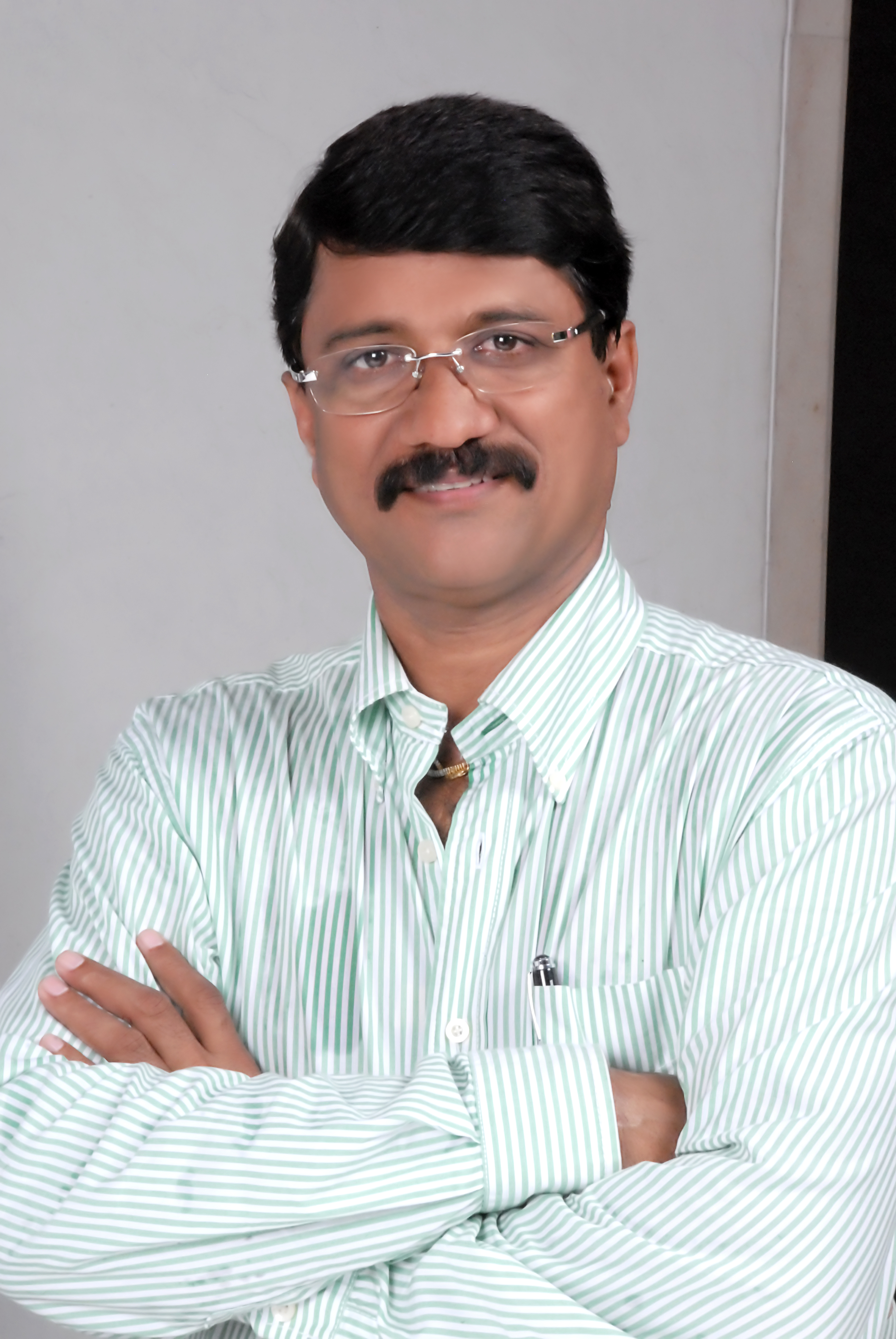

Member of the Maharashtra Legislative Assembly for Kalyan Rural
- In office 2014–2019
- Preceded by: Ramesh Ratan Patil
- Succeeded by: Pramod Ratan Patil

Personal details
- Born: 2 June 1958 (age 68) Thane, Bombay State, India
- Party: Bharatiya Janata Party
- Occupation: Builder, social worker

Subhash Ganu Bhoir (born 2 June 1958) is an Indian Shiv Sena politician from Thane district, Maharashtra. He is a former member of the Maharashtra Legislative Assembly, representing the Kalyan Rural constituency in the 13th Assembly. He is also former Member of Maharashtra Legislative Council.

== Positions held ==
- 2010: Elected to Maharashtra Legislative Council
- 2014: Elected to Maharashtra Legislative Assembly
- 2015: Sampark Pramukh Parbhani, Hingoli district
