= Gadchiroli–Chimur Lok Sabha constituency =

Constituency of the Indian parliament in Maharashtra

Coordinates: 20.3°N 79.7°E

Gadchiroli – Chimur MH-12
- Lok Sabha constituency
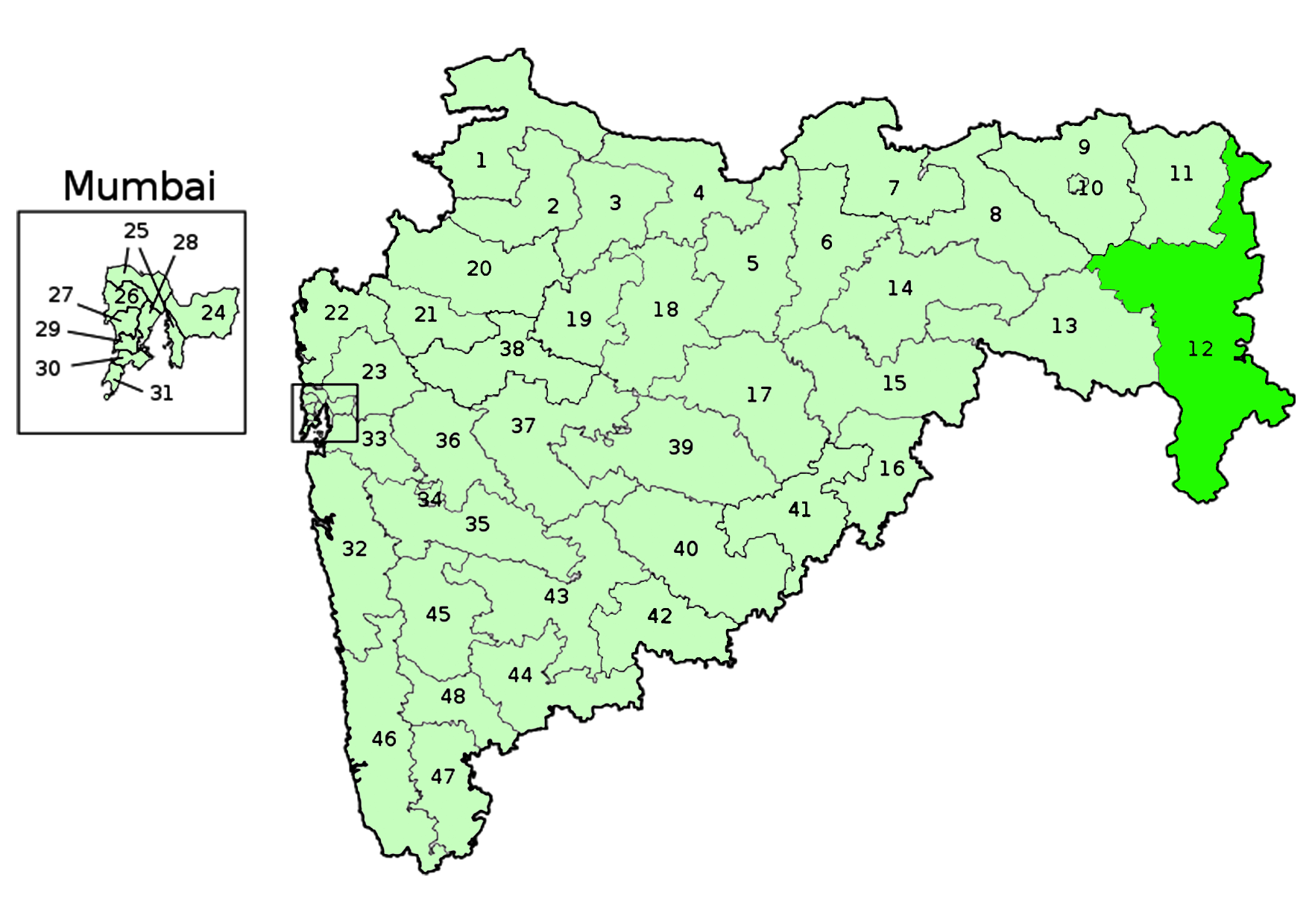
- Area of Constituency

Constituency details
- Country: India
- Region: Western India
- State: Maharashtra
- Assembly constituencies: Amgaon; Armori; Gadchiroli; Aheri; Bramhapuri; Chimur
- Established: 2008
- Total electors: 16,17,207 (2024)
- Reservation: ST

Member of Parliament
- 18th Lok Sabha
- Incumbent Namdeo Kirsan
- Party: Indian National Congress
- Elected year: 2024
- Preceded by: Ashok Nete, BJP

Gadchiroli–Chimur Lok Sabha constituency is one of the 48 Lok Sabha (parliamentary) constituencies of Maharashtra state in western India. This constituency came into existence on 19 February 2008 as a part of the implementation of the Presidential notification on delimitation of parliamentary constituencies based on the recommendations of the Delimitation Commission of India constituted on 12 July 2002. This seat is reserved for Scheduled Tribes. It first held elections in 2009 and its first member of parliament (MP) was Marotrao Kowase of the Indian National Congress.

== Assembly segments ==
As of 2014, Gadchiroli–Chimur Lok Sabha constituency comprises six Vidhan Sabha (legislative assembly) segments. These segments are:

No	Name	District	Member	Party	Leading (in 2024)
66	Amgaon (ST)	Gondia	Sanjay Hanmantrao Puram	BJP	INC
67	Armori (ST)	Gadchiroli	Ramdas Maluji Masram	INC	INC
68	Gadchiroli (ST)	Gadchiroli	Milind Ramji Narote	BJP	INC
69	Aheri (ST)	Gadchiroli	Dharamraobaba Bhagwantrao Aatram	NCP	INC
73	Bramhapuri	Chandrapur	Vijay Namdevrao Wadettiwar	INC	INC
74	Chimur	Chandrapur	Bunty Bhangdiya	BJP	INC

Armori and Chimur assembly segments were earlier in part of the former Chimur constituency, while Gadchiroli assembly segment was earlier in the former Chandrapur constituency.

== Members of Parliament ==
Year	Name	Party
Until 2009 :See Chimur
2009	Marotrao Kowase	Indian National Congress
2014	Ashok Nete	Bharatiya Janata Party
2019	Ashok Nete	Bharatiya Janata Party
2024	Namdeo Kirsan	Indian National Congress

== Election results ==
=== 2024 ===
2024 Indian general election: Gadchiroli-Chimur
Party	Candidate	Votes	%	±%
INC	Namdeo Kirsan	617,792	52.97	▲14.25
BJP	Ashok Nete	4,76,096	40.82	▼4.68
BSP	Gonnade Yogesh Namdeorao	19,055	1.63	▼0.83
NOTA	None of the above	16,577	1.42	▼0.73
VBA	Hitesh Madavi	15,922	1.37	▼8.38
Majority		1,41,696	12.15	▲5.37
Turnout		11,66,360	72.12	▼0.21
INC gain from BJP		Swing		

=== 2019 ===
2019 Indian general elections: Gadchiroli-Chimur
Party	Candidate	Votes	%	±%
BJP	Ashok Nete	519,968	45.50	▼6.68
INC	Dr. Namdeo Dalluji Usendi	4,42,442	38.72	▲9.60
VBA	Rameshkumar Baburaoji Gajbe	1,11,468	9.75	New
BSP	Harichandra Nagoji Mangam	28,104	2.46	▼4.05
NOTA	None of the Above	24,599	2.15	N/A
Margin of victory		77,526	6.78	▼16.28
Turnout		11,42,698	72.33	▲2.29
BJP gain from INC		Swing		

=== General elections 2014 ===
2014 Indian general elections: Gadchiroli-Chimur
Party	Candidate	Votes	%	±%
BJP	Ashok Nete	535,982	52.18	▲17.16
INC	Dr. Namdeo Dalluji Usendi	2,99,112	29.12	▼9.31
BSP	Ramrao Govinda Nannaware	66,906	6.51	▼9.70
AAP	Rameshkumar Baburaoji Gajbe	45,458	4.43	New
CPI	Namdeo Anandrao Kannake	22,512	2.19	▲0.56
AITC	Satish Gokuldas Pendam	8,156	0.79	N/A
API	Deorao Monba Nannaware	6,606	0.64	New
Independent	Dandekar Baburao Laxman	6,470	0.63	N/A
SP	Vinod Ankush Nannaware	4,287	0.42	N/A
BMP	Diwakar Pendam	3,730	0.36	New
RPI	Prabhakar Mahaguji Dadmal	3,422	0.33	N/A
NOTA	None of the Above	24,488	2.38	N/A
Margin of victory		2,36,870	23.06	▲19.65
Turnout		10,28,462	70.04	▲4.90
BJP gain from INC		Swing		

=== General elections 2009 ===
2009 Indian general elections: Gadchiroli-Chimur
Party	Candidate	Votes	%	±%
INC	Marotrao Kowase	321,756	38.43	
BJP	Ashok Nete	2,93,176	35.02	
BSP	Raje Satyavanrao Raje Vishveshvarrao Atram	1,35,756	16.21	
Independent	Dinesh Tukaram Madavi	25,857	3.09	
CPI	Namdeo Anandrao Kannake	23,001	2.75	
Independent	Jambhule Narayan Dinabhaji	8,916	1.06	
GGP	Vijay Surajsing Madavi	7,953	0.95	
BBM	Pendam Diwakar Gulab	7,240	0.86	
Margin of victory		28,580	3.41	
Turnout		8,37,247	65.14	
INC gain from BJP		Swing		

== See also ==
- Chimur Lok Sabha constituency ( 1967 to 2004 elections for 4th to 14th Lok Sabha )
- Chandrapur Lok Sabha constituency
- Gadchiroli district
- Chandrapur district
- Gondia district
- List of constituencies of the Lok Sabha
