= Sironcha Assembly constituency =

Constituency of the Maharashtra legislative assembly in India

Sironcha
- Former constituency for the Maharashtra Legislative Assembly

Constituency details
- Country: India
- Region: Western India
- State: Maharashtra
- Established: 1957
- Abolished: 2008
- Total electors: 190,226

Sironcha Assembly constituency was an assembly constituency in the India state of Maharashtra.

== Members of the Legislative Assembly ==
Election	Member	Party
1957	Raje Vishveshvar Rao Atram (St)	Independent politician
1957	Weakey Narayansinh Sampatsinh (St)	Praja Socialist Party
1962	Raje Vishveshvar Rao Atram	Independent politician
1967	J. Y. Sakhare	Independent politician
1972	Mukundrao Vithoba Alone	Indian National Congress
1978	Bhagwanshaha Jiwanshaha Meshram	Independent politician
1980	Penta Rama Talandi	Indian National Congress
1985	Raje Satyavanrao Raje Vishveshvarrao Atram	Independent politician
1990	Dharamraobaba Bhagwantrao Atram	Indian National Congress
1995	Raje Satyavanrao Raje Vishveshvarrao Atram	Nag Vidarbha Andolan Samiti
1999	Dharamraobaba Bhagwantrao Atram	Gondwana Ganatantra Party
2004	Dharamraobaba Bhagwantrao Atram	Nationalist Congress Party
2008 onwards : See Aheri
2009	Deepak Dada Atram	Independent
2014	Raje Ambrishrao Raje Satyawan Rao Atram	Bharatiya Janata Party
2019	Dharamrao Baba Atram	Nationalist Congress Party
2024	Dharamrao Baba Atram	Nationalist Congress Party

== Election results ==
=== Assembly Election 2004 ===
2004 Maharashtra Legislative Assembly election : Sironcha
Party	Candidate	Votes	%	±%
NCP	Dharamraobaba Bhagwantrao Atram	42,198	30.61%	▲20.94
BSP	Atram Dipak Dada	34,831	25.26%	New
Nag Vidarbha Andolan Samiti	Raje Satyavan Rao	29,499	21.40%	▼0.16
SP	Sau Sagunatai Pentaji Talandi	17,763	12.88%	New
Independent	Kumare Bajirao Bituji	8,790	6.38%	New
GGP	Parchake Mahadeo Janardan	2,519	1.83%	▼23.31
Shivrajya Party	Madavi Ramshaha	2,278	1.65%	New
Margin of victory		7,367	5.34%	▲5.01
Turnout		1,37,878	72.48%	▲2.47
Total valid votes		1,37,878		
Registered electors		1,90,226		▲9.89
NCP gain from GGP		Swing	▲5.47	

=== Assembly Election 1999 ===
1999 Maharashtra Legislative Assembly election : Sironcha
Party	Candidate	Votes	%	±%
GGP	Dharamraobaba Bhagwantrao Atram	27,982	25.14%	New
INC	Talandi Saguna Penta	27,607	24.80%	▼3.99
Nag Vidarbha Andolan Samiti	Atram Raje Satyavanrao Raje Vishveshvarrao	23,991	21.55%	▼39.23
BJP	Joga Madavi	20,979	18.84%	▲15.32
NCP	Atram Deepak Mallaji	10,765	9.67%	New
Margin of victory		375	0.34%	▼31.66
Turnout		1,21,193	70.01%	▼10.80
Total valid votes		1,11,324		
Registered electors		1,73,100		▲5.26
GGP gain from Nag Vidarbha Andolan Samiti		Swing	▼35.65	

=== Assembly Election 1995 ===
1995 Maharashtra Legislative Assembly election : Sironcha
Party	Candidate	Votes	%	±%
Nag Vidarbha Andolan Samiti	Atram Raje Satyavanrao Raje Vishveshvarrao	80,780	60.78%	New
INC	Dharamraobaba Bhagwantrao Atram	38,257	28.79%	▼7.31
BJP	Pendor Chhabildas Sambhaji	4,688	3.53%	▼1.67
BSP	Kulheti Jailabai Dhanu	4,290	3.23%	▲2.74
Independent	Talandi Penta Ramaji	1,862	1.40%	New
Independent	Talandi Bapu Bonda	1,740	1.31%	New
Independent	Talandi Ramchandra Rajanna	885	0.67%	New
Margin of victory		42,523	32.00%	▲26.96
Turnout		1,43,389	87.19%	▲28.84
Total valid votes		1,32,904		
Registered electors		1,64,456		▲16.96
Nag Vidarbha Andolan Samiti gain from INC		Swing	▲24.69	

=== Assembly Election 1990 ===
1990 Maharashtra Legislative Assembly election : Sironcha
Party	Candidate	Votes	%	±%
INC	Dharamraobaba Bhagwantrao Atram	26,377	36.09%	▲3.76
Independent	Atram Raje Satyavanrao Raje Vishveshvarrao	22,697	31.06%	New
JD	Madavi Joga Nanayya	14,364	19.65%	New
Independent	Talandi Bapu Bonda	4,860	6.65%	New
BJP	Hichami Manohar Mangru	3,800	5.20%	New
Independent	Bogami Malu Kopa	565	0.77%	New
Margin of victory		3,680	5.04%	▼19.88
Turnout		76,211	54.20%	▼0.47
Total valid votes		73,084		
Registered electors		1,40,605		▲27.22
INC gain from Independent		Swing	▼21.16	

=== Assembly Election 1985 ===
1985 Maharashtra Legislative Assembly election : Sironcha
Party	Candidate	Votes	%	±%
Independent	Atram Raje Satyavanrao Raje Vishveshvarrao	33,186	57.25%	New
INC	Talandi Penta Rama	18,745	32.34%	New
Independent	Madavi Joga Nanayya	4,852	8.37%	New
Independent	Naroti Peka Kotti	1,186	2.05%	New
Margin of victory		14,441	24.91%	
Turnout		61,068	55.26%	
Total valid votes		57,969		
Registered electors		1,10,519		
Independent gain from INC(I)		Swing		

=== Assembly Election 1980 ===
1980 Maharashtra Legislative Assembly election : Sironcha
Party	Candidate	Votes	%	±%
INC(I)	Talandi Penta Rama	Unopposed		
INC(I) gain from Independent		Swing		

=== Assembly Election 1978 ===
1978 Maharashtra Legislative Assembly election : Sironcha
Party	Candidate	Votes	%	±%
Independent	Meshram Bhagwanshaha Jiwanshaha	41,667	81.14%	New
INC	Talandi Penta Rama	5,283	10.29%	▼35.40
Independent	Kumre Bajirao Mittya	2,395	4.66%	New
Independent	Karpet Mondi Lachayya	2,009	3.91%	New
Margin of victory		36,384	70.85%	▲60.66
Turnout		54,454	60.35%	▲4.03
Total valid votes		51,354		
Registered electors		90,230		▼4.10
Independent gain from INC		Swing	▲35.45	

=== Assembly Election 1972 ===
1972 Maharashtra Legislative Assembly election : Sironcha
Party	Candidate	Votes	%	±%
INC	Alone Mukundrao Vithoba	22,733	45.68%	▲8.78
RPI(K)	Jamnadas Khobaragade	17,664	35.50%	New
Independent	Shaawan Sukaji Undirwade	5,242	10.53%	New
RPI	Khushal Sakharam Aotare	4,122	8.28%	▼8.33
Margin of victory		5,069	10.19%	▲5.93
Turnout		52,739	56.05%	▲4.05
Total valid votes		49,761		
Registered electors		94,085		▲18.78
INC gain from Independent		Swing	▲4.53	

=== Assembly Election 1967 ===
1967 Maharashtra Legislative Assembly election : Sironcha
Party	Candidate	Votes	%	±%
Independent	J. Y. Sakhare	15,920	41.16%	New
INC	M. V. Alone	14,275	36.90%	▲18.96
RPI	L. N. Khobragade	6,425	16.61%	New
Independent	A. R. Gedam	2,063	5.33%	New
Margin of victory		1,645	4.25%	▼42.57
Turnout		42,361	53.48%	▼11.58
Total valid votes		38,683		
Registered electors		79,207		▲24.19
Independent hold		Swing	▼23.61	

=== Assembly Election 1962 ===
1962 Maharashtra Legislative Assembly election : Sironcha
Party	Candidate	Votes	%	±%
Independent	Vishweshwarrao Dharmarrao Atram	24,955	64.77%	New
INC	Murli Manoharrao Sriniwas Venkat	6,915	17.95%	▲1.39
Independent	Patruji Tanuji Ture	6,661	17.29%	New
Margin of victory		18,040	46.82%	▲44.14
Turnout		43,174	67.69%	▼47.13
Total valid votes		38,531		
Registered electors		63,779		▼43.88
Independent hold		Swing	▲29.78	

=== Assembly Election 1957 ===
1957 Bombay State Legislative Assembly election : Sironcha
Party	Candidate	Votes	%	±%
Independent	Atram Vishweshwarrao Dharmrao (St)	42,767	34.99%	New
PSP	Weakey Narayansinh Sampatsinh (St)	39,494	32.31%	New
INC	Poreddiwar Namdeo Balaji	20,236	16.56%	New
INC	Narote Marotrao Raghoba (St)	19,729	16.14%	New
Margin of victory		3,273	2.68%	
Turnout		1,22,226	107.54%	
Total valid votes		1,22,226		
Registered electors		1,13,653		
Independent win (new seat)				
