= Gadchiroli Sironcha Assembly constituency =

Constituency of the Madhya Pradesh legislative assembly in India

Gadchiroli Sironcha
- Former constituency for the Madhya Pradesh Legislative Assembly

Constituency details
- Country: India
- Region: Central India
- State: Madhya Pradesh
- Established: 1951
- Abolished: 1955
- Total electors: 90,636
- Reservation: ST

Gadchiroli Sironcha Assembly constituency was an assembly constituency in the India state of Madhya Pradesh. After the 1955 Delimitation act, it was merged into Gadchiroli, Armori, Sironcha and Chamorshi constituencies.

== Members of the Legislative Assembly ==
Election	Member	Party
1952	Kirtimantrao Bhujangrao; Namdeorao Balaji Poreddiwar	Indian National Congress

== Election results ==
=== Assembly Election 1952 ===
1952 Hyderabad State Legislative Assembly election : Gadchiroli Sironcha
Party	Candidate	Votes	%	±%
INC	Kirtimantrao Bhujangrao	38,075	36.24%	New
INC	Namdeorao Balaji Poreddiwar	34,494	32.83%	New
Socialist	Maroti Rughoba Naroti	16,961	16.14%	New
Socialist	V. K. Iyer	12,028	11.45%	New
ABJS	Bhagwantrao Krishnarao Bapu	3,512	3.34%	New
Margin of victory		3,581	3.41%	
Turnout		105,070	115.93%	
Total valid votes		105,070		
Registered electors		90,636		
INC win (new seat)				
