= Amgaon Assembly constituency =

Constituency of the Maharashtra legislative assembly in India

Coordinates: 21.37°N 80.38°E

Amgaon
- Constituency No. 66 for the Maharashtra Legislative Assembly

Constituency details
- Country: India
- Region: Western India
- State: Maharashtra
- District: Gondia
- Lok Sabha constituency: Gadchiroli-Chimur
- Established: 1952
- Total electors: 270,014
- Reservation: ST

Member of Legislative Assembly
- 15th Maharashtra Legislative Assembly
- Incumbent Sanjay Hanmantrao Puram
- Party: BJP
- Alliance: NDA
- Elected year: 2024

Amgaon Assembly constituency (formerly Jamgaon) is one of the constituencies of Maharashtra Legislative Assembly, in India.

== Overview ==
Amgaon is one of the four Vidhan Sabha constituencies located in the Gondia district. and comprises the entire Deori, Salekasa and Amgaon tehsils of the district. This constituency is reserved for the candidates belonging to the Scheduled tribes.

Amgaon is part of the Gadchiroli-Chimur Lok Sabha constituency along with five other Vidhan Sabha segments, namely Armori, Gadchiroli and Aheri in the Gadchiroli district and Brahmapuri and Chimur in the Chandrapur district. Before 2009, it used to be part of the now defunct Bhandara (Lok Sabha constituency).

== Member of the Legislative Assembly ==
Year	Member	Party
1952	Girdharilal Chaturbhui Sharma	Indian National Congress
1957	Shushilabai Keshaorao Ingle	Indian National Congress
1962	Narayan Mohani Bahekar	Praja Socialist Party
1967	Laxmanrao Mankar	Bharatiya Jana Sangh
1972	Swarupchand Ajmera	Indian National Congress
1978	Mahadeo Shivankar	Janata Party
1980	Mahadeo Shivankar	Bharatiya Janata Party
1985	Mahadeo Shivankar	Bharatiya Janata Party
1990	Bharatbhau Narayanbhau Bahekar	Indian National Congress
1995	Mahadeo Shivankar	Bharatiya Janata Party
1999	Mahadeo Shivankar	Bharatiya Janata Party
2004	Bhersinh Dukluji Nagpure	Bharatiya Janata Party
2009	Ramratanbapu Bharatbhapu Raut	Indian National Congress
2014	Sanjay Hanmantrao Puram	Bharatiya Janata Party
2019	Korote Sahasram Maroti	Indian National Congress
2024	Sanjay Hanmantrao Puram	Bharatiya Janata Party

Madhya Pradesh
Bombay State

== Election results ==
=== Assembly Election 2024 ===
2024 Maharashtra Legislative Assembly election : Amgaon
Party	Candidate	Votes	%	±%
BJP	Sanjay Hanmantrao Puram	110,123	56.17%	▲11.60
INC	Rajkumar Lotuji Puram	77,402	39.48%	▼9.18
Rashtriya Gondvana Party	Devavilas Tularam Bhogare	2,706	1.38%	New
BSP	Dilip Ramadhin Jula	1,569	0.80%	▼0.94
VBA	Nikesh Jhadu Gawad	1,401	0.71%	▼0.59
NOTA	None of the above	1,194	0.61%	▼0.43
Margin of victory		32,721	16.69%	▲12.60
Turnout		197,257	73.05%	▲4.38
Total valid votes		196,063		
Registered electors		270,014		▲1.13
BJP gain from INC		Swing	▲7.51	

=== Assembly Election 2019 ===
2019 Maharashtra Legislative Assembly election : Amgaon
Party	Candidate	Votes	%	±%
INC	Korote Sahasram Maroti	88,265	48.66%	▲23.19
BJP	Sanjay Hanmantrao Puram	80,845	44.57%	▲8.58
Independent	Ramratanbapu Bharatbhapu Raut	3,546	1.96%	New
BSP	Amar Shalikram Pandhare	3,149	1.74%	▼1.79
VBA	Subhash Laxmanrao Ramrame	2,360	1.30%	New
NOTA	None of the above	1,884	1.04%	▼0.27
Independent	Gawad Nikesh Zadu	1,281	0.71%	New
Margin of victory		7,420	4.09%	▼6.43
Turnout		183,344	68.67%	▼1.10
Total valid votes		181,375		
Registered electors		266,988		▲5.68
INC gain from BJP		Swing	▲12.67	

=== Assembly Election 2014 ===
2014 Maharashtra Legislative Assembly election : Amgaon
Party	Candidate	Votes	%	±%
BJP	Sanjay Hanmantrao Puram	62,590	35.99%	▼2.05
INC	Ramratanbapu Bharatbhapu Raut	44,295	25.47%	▼17.03
NCP	Taram Ramesh Narayan	35,911	20.65%	New
Independent	Korote Sahasram Maroti	13,414	7.71%	New
SS	Gawrane Mulchand Harichand	9,174	5.28%	New
BSP	Sharda Uderam Uikey	6,134	3.53%	▼0.76
NOTA	None of the above	2,281	1.31%	New
Independent	Wakil Keshaokumar Laxmanrao Bhoyar	1,225	0.70%	New
Margin of victory		18,295	10.52%	▲6.06
Turnout		176,282	69.77%	▼0.23
Total valid votes		173,903		
Registered electors		252,649		▲15.67
BJP gain from INC		Swing	▼6.51	

=== Assembly Election 2009 ===
2009 Maharashtra Legislative Assembly election : Amgaon
Party	Candidate	Votes	%	±%
INC	Ramratanbapu Bharatbhapu Raut	64,975	42.50%	New
BJP	Taram Ramesh Narayan	58,158	38.04%	▲6.10
Independent	Shankarbhau Gunelalji Madavi	17,698	11.58%	New
BSP	Madavi Pushpa Ambarlal	6,555	4.29%	▼6.22
RPI(A)	Omprakash Atmaram Masram	1,914	1.25%	New
Independent	Rane Shrawan Bholaram	974	0.64%	New
Independent	Marskole Nalenj Keshvrao	932	0.61%	New
Margin of victory		6,817	4.46%	▲4.07
Turnout		152,891	70.00%	▼7.30
Total valid votes		152,884		
Registered electors		218,421		▲10.60
INC gain from BJP		Swing	▲10.56	

=== Assembly Election 2004 ===
2004 Maharashtra Legislative Assembly election : Amgaon
Party	Candidate	Votes	%	±%
BJP	Nagpure Bhersinh Dukluji	48,760	31.94%	▼17.05
NCP	Nareshkumar Amritlal Maheshwari	48,167	31.55%	New
Independent	Ramratanbapu Bharatbhapu Raut	32,930	21.57%	New
BSP	Bablu Katre	16,046	10.51%	▲9.98
Independent	Bhagatsingh Mansingh Madavi	1,815	1.19%	New
BBM	Yadavbhau Panchamvar	1,787	1.17%	New
GGP	Rajesh Dr. Harishchandra Salam	1,199	0.79%	▲0.24
SP	Amkar Gyaniram Bazirao	997	0.65%	New
Margin of victory		593	0.39%	▼1.52
Turnout		152,656	77.30%	▲2.24
Total valid votes		152,648		
Registered electors		197,486		▲7.52
BJP hold		Swing	▼17.05	

=== Assembly Election 1999 ===
1999 Maharashtra Legislative Assembly election : Amgaon
Party	Candidate	Votes	%	±%
BJP	Mahadeo Shivankar	65,705	48.99%	▲0.22
INC	Ramratanbapu Bharatbhapu Raut	63,140	47.08%	▼0.13
JP	Mankar Vishwanath Laxmanrao	1,988	1.48%	New
Margin of victory		2,565	1.91%	▲0.35
Turnout		137,860	75.06%	▼7.92
Total valid votes		134,107		
Registered electors		183,673		▲2.46
BJP hold		Swing	▲0.22	

=== Assembly Election 1995 ===
1995 Maharashtra Legislative Assembly election : Amgaon
Party	Candidate	Votes	%	±%
BJP	Mahadeo Shivankar	70,402	48.77%	▲23.01
INC	Bahekar Bharatbhau Narayanbhau	68,154	47.21%	▲10.66
Independent	Neware Gopal Fattuji	2,147	1.49%	New
Independent	Akre Sadashiv Mansaram	1,720	1.19%	New
Margin of victory		2,248	1.56%	▼9.23
Turnout		148,746	82.98%	▲12.51
Total valid votes		144,355		
Registered electors		179,256		▲10.62
BJP gain from INC		Swing	▲12.22	

=== Assembly Election 1990 ===
1990 Maharashtra Legislative Assembly election : Amgaon
Party	Candidate	Votes	%	±%
INC	Bahekar Bharatbhau Narayanbhau	41,134	36.55%	▼4.05
BJP	Nagpure Bhersinh Dukluji	28,991	25.76%	▼30.48
Independent	Gajanan Ataru Chute	14,080	12.51%	New
Independent	Dayarambhau Dasharath Bhaktawarti	11,823	10.50%	New
Independent	Keshav Kunjilal Kalyam	9,835	8.74%	New
JD	Bagdiya Radheshyam Bholaram	4,077	3.62%	New
BSP	Madavi Shankarlal Gune	1,413	1.26%	New
Independent	Raut Taranrao Janardan	722	0.64%	New
Margin of victory		12,143	10.79%	▼4.85
Turnout		114,196	70.47%	▲0.67
Total valid votes		112,547		
Registered electors		162,050		▲22.26
INC gain from BJP		Swing	▼19.69	

=== Assembly Election 1985 ===
1985 Maharashtra Legislative Assembly election : Amgaon
Party	Candidate	Votes	%	±%
BJP	Mahadeo Shivankar	51,114	56.24%	▲6.02
INC	Jain Swaroopchand Jethmal	36,897	40.60%	New
Independent	Sadashiorao Mansaram Akhre	1,489	1.64%	New
Independent	Tembhurnikar Shamrao Mangaldas	1,274	1.40%	New
Margin of victory		14,217	15.64%	▲9.56
Turnout		92,515	69.80%	▲5.25
Total valid votes		90,886		
Registered electors		132,543		▲9.02
BJP hold		Swing	▲6.02	

=== Assembly Election 1980 ===
1980 Maharashtra Legislative Assembly election : Amgaon
Party	Candidate	Votes	%	±%
BJP	Mahadeo Shivankar	38,522	50.22%	New
INC(I)	Jain Kewalchand Kanhaiyalal	33,859	44.14%	▲5.42
RPI(K)	Bhaladhare Madhorao Digambar	4,322	5.63%	New
Margin of victory		4,663	6.08%	▼2.58
Turnout		78,470	64.55%	▼4.16
Total valid votes		76,703		
Registered electors		121,572		▲6.63
BJP gain from JP		Swing	▲2.84	

=== Assembly Election 1978 ===
1978 Maharashtra Legislative Assembly election : Amgaon
Party	Candidate	Votes	%	±%
JP	Mahadeo Shivankar	35,727	47.38%	New
INC(I)	Bhaktawarti Dayaram Dashrath	29,197	38.72%	New
INC	Bahekar Narayanbhau Mohanji	5,522	7.32%	▼47.51
Independent	Maraskole Raghunath Atmaram	2,725	3.61%	New
Independent	Salem Harichandra Bhiwram	1,182	1.57%	New
Margin of victory		6,530	8.66%	▼10.06
Turnout		78,343	68.71%	▲5.73
Total valid votes		75,407		
Registered electors		114,015		▲21.87
JP gain from INC		Swing	▼7.45	

=== Assembly Election 1972 ===
1972 Maharashtra Legislative Assembly election : Amgaon
Party	Candidate	Votes	%	±%
INC	Swarupchand Ajmera	31,000	54.83%	▲30.01
ABJS	Laxman Rao Bisanji Mankar	20,418	36.11%	▲2.46
RPI	Shantabai Doye	5,122	9.06%	New
Margin of victory		10,582	18.72%	▲17.20
Turnout		58,921	62.98%	▲8.15
Total valid votes		56,540		
Registered electors		93,557		▲13.35
INC gain from ABJS		Swing	▲21.18	

=== Assembly Election 1967 ===
1967 Maharashtra Legislative Assembly election : Amgaon
Party	Candidate	Votes	%	±%
ABJS	Laxmanrao Mankar	13,844	33.65%	New
SSP	N. M. Bahekar	13,218	32.13%	New
INC	S. S. Mishra	10,211	24.82%	▲6.06
Independent	D. M. Madavi	2,690	6.54%	New
Independent	S. B. Pardhi	685	1.66%	New
Independent	D. G. Gajbhiye	290	0.70%	New
Margin of victory		626	1.52%	▼15.26
Turnout		45,261	54.83%	▲19.41
Total valid votes		41,145		
Registered electors		82,541		▼0.33
ABJS gain from PSP		Swing	▼3.31	

=== Assembly Election 1962 ===
1962 Maharashtra Legislative Assembly election : Amgaon
Party	Candidate	Votes	%	±%
PSP	Narayan Mohani Bahekar	9,631	36.96%	▲13.86
ABJS	Laxmanrao Mankar	5,260	20.19%	New
INC	Sushilabai Keshaoraoji Igle	4,887	18.76%	▼10.52
Independent	Dulichand Ganuji Gajbiye	3,289	12.62%	New
Independent	Chhanuji Bajirao	1,354	5.20%	New
Independent	Shantabai Doye	888	3.41%	New
Independent	Umraossing Mannalalsing Jawheri	747	2.87%	New
Margin of victory		4,371	16.78%	▲10.59
Turnout		29,331	35.42%	▼1.60
Total valid votes		26,056		
Registered electors		82,812		▲15.83
PSP gain from INC		Swing	▲7.68	

=== Assembly Election 1957 ===
1957 Bombay State Legislative Assembly election : Amgaon
Party	Candidate	Votes	%	±%
INC	Ingle Shushilabai Keshaorao	7,750	29.28%	▲0.52
PSP	Kewal Chand Kanhailal	6,113	23.10%	New
Independent	Mohanlal Karanshubapu	5,778	21.83%	New
Independent	Deorao Onkar	4,139	15.64%	New
Independent	Doye Shantabai Balirambhau	2,687	10.15%	New
Margin of victory		1,637	6.19%	▼0.27
Turnout		26,467	37.02%	▼6.88
Total valid votes		26,467		
Registered electors		71,494		▲54.63
INC hold		Swing	▲0.52	

=== Assembly Election 1952 ===
1952 Hyderabad State Legislative Assembly election : Amgaon
Party	Candidate	Votes	%	±%
INC	Girdharilal Chaturbhui Sharma	5,838	28.76%	New
Socialist	Kewa Chand Kanaihaylal Jain	4,526	22.30%	New
ABJS	Bholanath Bhau Mahlaharbhau Bahekar	3,764	18.55%	New
Independent	Rameshwarji Rampratap Agarwal	3,230	15.91%	New
KMPP	Narayan Mohoni Bahekar	2,534	12.49%	New
Independent	Bansilal Kisanlal Verma	404	1.99%	New
Margin of victory		1,312	6.46%	
Turnout		20,296	43.90%	
Total valid votes		20,296		
Registered electors		46,237		
INC win (new seat)				

== See also ==
- Amgaon
- List of constituencies of Maharashtra Vidhan Sabha
