= Armori Assembly constituency =

Constituency of the Maharashtra legislative assembly in India

Coordinates: 20°27′57.38″N 79°59′12.22″E

Armori
- Constituency No. 67 for the Maharashtra Legislative Assembly

Constituency details
- Country: India
- Region: Western India
- State: Maharashtra
- District: Gadchiroli
- Lok Sabha constituency: Gadchiroli-Chimur
- Established: 1957
- Total electors: 262,977
- Reservation: ST

Member of Legislative Assembly
- 15th Maharashtra Legislative Assembly
- Incumbent Ramdas Maluji Masram
- Party: INC
- Alliance: MVA
- Elected year: 2024

Armori Assembly constituency, formerly known as Armoor is one of the 288 Vidhan Sabha (legislative assembly) constituencies of Maharashtra state in central India.

== Overview ==
Armori is one of the three Vidhan Sabha constituencies located in Gadchiroli district. and comprises the entire Desaiganj (Wadsa), Armori, Kurkheda and Korchi tehsils and part of Dhanora tehsil of the district. This constituency is reserved for the candidates belonging to the Scheduled tribes.

Armori is part of the Gadchiroli-Chimur Lok Sabha constituency along with five other Vidhan Sabha segments, namely Gadchiroli and Aheri in Gadchiroli district, Brahmapuri and Chimur in Chandrapur district and Amgaon in Gondia district.

== Members of the Legislative Assembly ==
Year	Member	Party
1957	Tadurwar Krishnaya Venkayya	Indian National Congress
1962	Jagannath Temsaji Mhashakhetri	Indian National Congress
1967	Dinaji Narnaware	Indian National Congress
1972	Baburao Madavi	Indian National Congress
1978	Dinaji Narnaware	Independent
1980	Baburao Madavi	Indian National Congress (I)
1985	Sukhadeobabu Uikey	Indian Congress (Socialist)
1990	Hariram Warkhade	Shiv Sena
1995	Ramkrushna Madavi	Shiv Sena
1999	Ramkrushna Madavi	Shiv Sena
2004	Anandrao Gedam	Indian National Congress
2009	Anandrao Gedam	Indian National Congress
2014	Krishna Gajbe	Bharatiya Janata Party
2019	Krishna Gajbe	Bharatiya Janata Party
2024	Ramdas Masram	Indian National Congress

Bombay State

== Election results ==
=== Assembly Election 2024 ===
2024 Maharashtra Legislative Assembly election : Armori
Party	Candidate	Votes	%	±%
INC	Ramdas Maluji Masram	98,509	48.88%	▲18.81
BJP	Krishna Damaji Gajbe	92,299	45.80%	▲3.53
BSP	Anil (Kranti) Tularam Kerami	3,438	1.71%	▼0.23
Independent	Anandrao Gangaram Gedam	1,954	0.97%	New
ASP(KR)	Chetan Nevasha Katenge	1,927	0.96%	New
VBA	Mohandas Ganpat Puram	1,808	0.90%	▼3.36
NOTA	None of the above	1,762	0.87%	▼1.18
Margin of victory		6,210	3.08%	▼9.12
Turnout		203,296	77.31%	▲5.10
Total valid votes		201,534		
Registered electors		262,977		▲3.80
INC gain from BJP		Swing	▲6.61	

=== Assembly Election 2019 ===
2019 Maharashtra Legislative Assembly election : Armori
Party	Candidate	Votes	%	±%
BJP	Krishna Damaji Gajbe	75,077	42.27%	▲6.46
INC	Anandrao Gangaram Gedam	53,410	30.07%	▲1.81
Independent	Chandel Jayendrasingh Bajrangsingh	25,027	14.09%	New
VBA	Ramesh Lalsay Korcha	7,565	4.26%	New
NOTA	None of the above	3,650	2.05%	▼0.42
BSP	Balkrushna Shriram Sadmake	3,454	1.94%	▼7.36
CPI	Dilip Haridas Parchake	3,356	1.89%	▼1.45
Independent	Dudhakuwar Nanaji Gopala	3,149	1.77%	New
Independent	Baguji Kewalram Tadam	2,016	1.14%	New
Vidarbha Rajya Aghadi	Shree Mukesh Soguram Narote	1,615	0.91%	New
Margin of victory		21,667	12.20%	▲4.65
Turnout		182,938	72.21%	▼0.16
Total valid votes		177,621		
Registered electors		253,349		▲6.03
BJP hold		Swing	▲6.46	

=== Assembly Election 2014 ===
2014 Maharashtra Legislative Assembly election : Armori
Party	Candidate	Votes	%	±%
BJP	Krishna Damaji Gajbe	60,413	35.81%	New
INC	Anandrao Gangaram Gedam	47,680	28.26%	▼0.17
BSP	Komal Ravi Barsagde (Tadam)	15,697	9.30%	▼0.51
SS	Madavi Ramkrushna Hariji	14,224	8.43%	▼3.24
Independent	Chandel Jayendrasingh Bajrangsingh	9,490	5.63%	New
Independent	Nandubhau Narote	8,090	4.80%	New
CPI	Hiralal Govinda Yerame	5,641	3.34%	▼0.26
NOTA	None of the above	4,162	2.47%	New
Margin of victory		12,733	7.55%	▲3.72
Turnout		172,917	72.37%	▲1.82
Total valid votes		168,696		
Registered electors		238,937		▲16.14
BJP gain from INC		Swing	▲7.38	

=== Assembly Election 2009 ===
2009 Maharashtra Legislative Assembly election : Armori
Party	Candidate	Votes	%	±%
INC	Anandrao Gangaram Gedam	41,257	28.43%	▼9.40
Independent	Chandel Jayendrasingh Bajrangsingh	35,702	24.60%	New
SS	Randhaye Shravan Sitaram	16,933	11.67%	▼17.17
BSP	Dhurve Daulat Damaji	14,239	9.81%	▼11.19
Independent	Warkhade Hariram Atmaram	11,905	8.20%	New
Independent	Madavi Ramkrushna Hariji	11,828	8.15%	New
CPI	Avinash Govinda Narnaware	5,228	3.60%	New
Independent	Jambhule Madhukar Somaji	1,940	1.34%	New
Margin of victory		5,555	3.83%	▼5.16
Turnout		145,153	70.55%	▼3.35
Total valid votes		145,132		
Registered electors		205,731		▲7.29
INC hold		Swing	▼9.40	

=== Assembly Election 2004 ===
2004 Maharashtra Legislative Assembly election : Armori
Party	Candidate	Votes	%	±%
INC	Anandrao Gangaram Gedam	53,567	37.83%	▲7.86
SS	Madavi Ramkrushna Hariji	40,841	28.84%	▼1.46
BSP	Nandubhau Narote	29,736	21.00%	New
Independent	Dharne Shamrao Adkuji	7,489	5.29%	New
BBM	Krishnabhau Kohchade	3,104	2.19%	New
Peoples Republican Party	Hiralal Govinda Yerame	2,688	1.90%	New
Independent	Katenge Ramsuram Bisram	2,572	1.82%	New
GGP	Usendi Mansaram Narsing	1,606	1.13%	New
Margin of victory		12,726	8.99%	▲8.65
Turnout		141,692	73.90%	▼0.98
Total valid votes		141,603		
Registered electors		191,744		▲10.77
INC gain from SS		Swing	▲7.53	

=== Assembly Election 1999 ===
1999 Maharashtra Legislative Assembly election : Armori
Party	Candidate	Votes	%	±%
SS	Madavi Ramkrushna Hariji	36,410	30.30%	▲2.45
INC	Anandrao Gangaram Gedam	36,004	29.97%	▲19.33
Independent	Nandu Najukrao Narote	16,439	13.68%	New
NCP	Warkhade Hariram Atmaram	14,279	11.88%	New
Independent	Uike Sukhdeobabu Pundlik	6,115	5.09%	New
Independent	Shrirang Baburao Dhakate	5,366	4.47%	New
Independent	Sayam Modku Mahaguji	1,818	1.51%	New
Independent	Hiralal Govinda Yerame	1,461	1.22%	New
Margin of victory		406	0.34%	▼9.28
Turnout		129,612	74.88%	▼13.48
Total valid votes		120,146		
Registered electors		173,102		▲4.05
SS hold		Swing	▲2.45	

=== Assembly Election 1995 ===
1995 Maharashtra Legislative Assembly election : Armori
Party	Candidate	Votes	%	±%
SS	Madavi Ramkrushna Hariji	38,947	27.85%	▼15.09
Independent	Anandrao Gangaram Gedam	25,499	18.24%	New
Independent	Uike Sukhdeobabu Pundlik	24,787	17.73%	New
INC	Warkhade Hariram Atmaram	14,880	10.64%	▼23.08
Independent	Markam Rajendra Singh Shamsunder Singh Thakur	9,396	6.72%	New
JD	Gawale Bajoji Dhiraji	6,299	4.50%	▼11.51
Independent	Ramkrushna Somaji Nannaware	3,914	2.80%	New
BSP	Madavi Devanand Tulshiram	2,795	2.00%	New
Margin of victory		13,448	9.62%	▲0.40
Turnout		147,002	88.36%	▲30.28
Total valid votes		139,827		
Registered electors		166,369		▲11.28
SS hold		Swing	▼15.09	

=== Assembly Election 1990 ===
1990 Maharashtra Legislative Assembly election : Armori
Party	Candidate	Votes	%	±%
SS	Warkhade Hariram Atmaram	36,518	42.94%	New
INC	Weakey Sukhadeobabu Pundalik	28,681	33.72%	▲8.04
JD	Markam Rajendra Singh Shamsunder Singh Thakur	13,613	16.01%	New
Independent	Usendi Mukharu Sundersha	3,436	4.04%	New
Independent	Raut Keshaw Hiraman	981	1.15%	New
Independent	Taram Sitaram Madho	963	1.13%	New
Independent	Pendam Parasram Mangaruji	686	0.81%	New
Margin of victory		7,837	9.22%	▼33.53
Turnout		86,832	58.08%	▼4.33
Total valid votes		85,045		
Registered electors		149,510		▲23.92
SS gain from IC(S)		Swing	▼25.49	

=== Assembly Election 1985 ===
1985 Maharashtra Legislative Assembly election : Armori
Party	Candidate	Votes	%	±%
IC(S)	Weakey Sukhadeobabu Pundalik	50,356	68.43%	New
INC	Baburao Narayan Madavi	18,895	25.68%	New
RPI(K)	Gendam Ganesh Hiraman	4,341	5.90%	New
Margin of victory		31,461	42.75%	▼3.36
Turnout		75,298	62.41%	▲17.64
Total valid votes		73,592		
Registered electors		120,647		▲9.23
IC(S) gain from INC(I)		Swing	▲2.60	

=== Assembly Election 1980 ===
1980 Maharashtra Legislative Assembly election : Armori
Party	Candidate	Votes	%	±%
INC(I)	Baburao Narayan Madavi	31,352	65.83%	New
INC(U)	Pradhan Krushnarao Bapu Bhagirath Bapu	9,389	19.71%	New
JP	Weakey Sukhadeobabu Pundalik	6,886	14.46%	New
Margin of victory		21,963	46.11%	▲29.28
Turnout		49,451	44.77%	▼20.04
Total valid votes		47,627		
Registered electors		110,455		▲5.06
INC(I) gain from Independent		Swing	▲19.31	

=== Assembly Election 1978 ===
1978 Maharashtra Legislative Assembly election : Armori
Party	Candidate	Votes	%	±%
Independent	Narnaware Dinaji Vithobaji	30,374	46.52%	New
Independent	Weakey Sukhadeobabu Pundalik	19,384	29.69%	New
INC	Baburao Narayan Madavi	12,873	19.72%	▼51.47
Independent	Markam Rajendra Singh Shamsunder Singh Thakur	2,322	3.56%	New
Margin of victory		10,990	16.83%	▼34.68
Turnout		68,135	64.81%	▲17.11
Total valid votes		65,295		
Registered electors		105,133		▲9.15
Independent gain from INC		Swing	▼24.67	

=== Assembly Election 1972 ===
1972 Maharashtra Legislative Assembly election : Armori
Party	Candidate	Votes	%	±%
INC	Baburao Narayan Madavi	31,439	71.19%	▲31.38
SSP	Sukhdeobabu Wuyeeke	8,692	19.68%	New
Independent	Hiraman Benduji Warkhade	4,028	9.12%	New
Margin of victory		22,747	51.51%	▲46.17
Turnout		45,943	47.70%	▼2.83
Total valid votes		44,159		
Registered electors		96,317		▲12.65
INC hold		Swing	▲31.38	

=== Assembly Election 1967 ===
1967 Maharashtra Legislative Assembly election : Armori
Party	Candidate	Votes	%	±%
INC	D. V. Narnavare	15,707	39.81%	▼21.72
SSP	N. S. Uikey	13,601	34.47%	New
Independent	Raja F. S. Sayam	10,148	25.72%	New
Margin of victory		2,106	5.34%	▼17.72
Turnout		43,200	50.53%	▼8.38
Total valid votes		39,456		
Registered electors		85,500		▲16.83
INC hold		Swing	▼21.72	

=== Assembly Election 1962 ===
1962 Maharashtra Legislative Assembly election : Armori
Party	Candidate	Votes	%	±%
INC	Mhashakhetri Jagannath Temsaji	23,500	61.53%	▲3.12
RPI	Kosare Hiraman Lahanu	14,692	38.47%	New
Margin of victory		8,808	23.06%	▼7.79
Turnout		43,111	58.91%	▼4.41
Total valid votes		38,192		
Registered electors		73,181		▲11.56
INC hold		Swing	▲3.12	

=== Assembly Election 1957 ===
1957 Bombay State Legislative Assembly election : Armoor
Party	Candidate	Votes	%	±%
INC	Tadurwar Krishnaya Venkayya	24,261	58.41%	▲17.96
Independent	Neral Narayanrao Balaji	11,449	27.56%	New
PSP	Mhaske Shrihari Banaji	5,825	14.02%	New
Margin of victory		12,812	30.85%	▲11.75
Turnout		41,535	63.32%	▲12.98
Total valid votes		41,535		
Registered electors		65,599		▲30.92
INC gain from Socialist		Swing	▼1.14	

== See also ==
- Armori
- List of constituencies of Maharashtra Vidhan Sabha
