= Mahadeo Shivankar =

Indian politician (1940–2025)

Member of Parliament, Lok Sabha
- In office 2004–2009
- Preceded by: Namdeo Harbaji Diwathe
- Succeeded by: Constituency defunct
- Constituency: Chimur
- In office 1989–1991
- Preceded by: Vilas Muttemwar
- Succeeded by: Vilas Muttemwar
- Constituency: Chimur

Minister of Finance Government of Maharashtra
- In office June 1997 – October 1999
- Chief Minister: Manohar Joshi; Narayan Rane
- Preceded by: Eknath Khadse

Ministry of Water Resources Government of Maharashtra
- In office March 1995 – June 1997
- Chief Minister: Manohar Joshi
- Succeeded by: Eknath Khadse

Member of the Maharashtra Legislative Assembly for Amgaon
- In office 1995–2004
- Preceded by: Bharat Bahekar
- Succeeded by: Nagpure Bhersinh Dukluji
- In office 1978–1990
- Preceded by: Swarupchand Ajmera
- Succeeded by: Bharat Bahekar

Personal details
- Born: 7 April 1940 Gondia, Central Provinces and Berar, British India
- Died: 20 October 2025 (aged 85) Amgaon, Maharashtra, India
- Party: Bharatiya Janata Party
- Spouse: Mangla (m. 1962)
- Children: 3
- Education: Nagpur University (MA)

Mahadeorao Sukaji Shivankar (7 April 1940 – 20 October 2025) was an Indian politician belonging to Bharatiya Janata Party (BJP).

Shivankar was elected to Maharashtra assembly in 1978, 1980, 1985, 1995 and 1999 from Amgaon (Vidhan Sabha constituency). He was minister of irrigation and command area development under Manohar Joshi's government in Maharashtra in 1990s.

Later, he was a member of the 14th Lok Sabha (2004–2009) from Chimur constituency in Maharashtra.

Shivankar died on 20 October 2025, at the age of 85.

Lok Sabha
Preceded by Vilas Muttemwar	Member of Parliament for Chimur; 1989 – 1991	Succeeded by Vilas Muttemwar
Preceded by Namdeo Harbaji Diwathe	Member of Parliament for Chimur; 2004 – 2009	Succeeded by Marotrao Kowase; Part of Gadchiroli–Chimur Constituency
