= Ravindra Bawanthade =

Indian politician

- Occupations: Ex.BJP Leader, party in-charge of Armori, Gadchiroli
- Organization: Ex. Bhartiya Janata Party
- Known for: Rape in a moving bus
- Criminal charges: Rape
- Capture status: Arrested

Details
- Date apprehended: 5 July 2017

Ravindra Bawanthade, was a BJP Leader and was party in-charge of Armori (Vidhan Sabha constituency) of Gadchirolidistrict during the 2014 state elections. He also worked as supervisor at a school in Nagbhid in Chandrapur district of Maharashtra.

On 27 June 2017, he was recorded in a bus kissing and having sex with a young woman, the video went viral across social media platforms. The bus was going from Chandrapur area of Gadchiroli district to Nagpur. The women seen in the footage of the CCTV from the bus had filed charges against Bawanthade. The woman alleged that the encounter was not consensual and that Bawanthade had forced himself upon her. After the CCTV video circulated on social media, her complaint was filed. ABP news reported that the woman had mentioned in the complaint that the BJP leader had made promise for a job and had assured to marry her.

He was arrested on a charge of allegedly raping the woman. The bus conductor and the driver were also arrested under IT Act for releasing the CCTV footage of the incident on Social media.
