= Deorao =

Deorao is a given name and middle name. People with the name include:

- Deorao Vithoba Bhongle, Indian politician
- Deorao Madguji Holi, Indian politician
- Uttamrao Deorao Patil (1944–2012), Indian politician
