= Namdeo Harbaji Diwathe =

Indian politician (born 1933)

Member of Parliament, Lok Sabha
- In office 1999–2004
- Preceded by: Jogendra Kawade
- Succeeded by: Mahadeo Shivankar
- Constituency: Chimur
- In office 1996–1998
- Preceded by: Vilas Muttemwar
- Succeeded by: Jogendra Kawade
- Constituency: Chimur

Member of Maharashtra Legislative Assembly
- In office 1985–1995
- Preceded by: Hiralal Bhaiyya
- Succeeded by: Dayaram Kapgate
- Constituency: Lakhandur

Personal details
- Born: 7 October 1933; Lakhandur, Bhandara district, British India
- Political party: Bharatiya Janata Party
- Spouse: Nirmala Diwathe
- Children: 2 sons, 5 daughters
- Parents: Harbaji Diwathe (father); Sitabai Diwathe (mother)

Namdeo Harbaji Diwathe (born 7 October 1933) is an Indian former politician who was a member of the 11th Lok Sabha of India. He represented the Chimur constituency of Maharashtra and is a member of the Bharatiya Janata Party political party.
