= Ashok Nete =

Indian politician

Member of Parliament, Lok Sabha
- In office (2014-2019), (2019 – 2024)
- Preceded by: Marotrao Kowase
- Succeeded by: Namdeo Kirsan
- Constituency: Gadchiroli–Chimur

Member of Maharashtra Legislative Assembly
- In office (1999-2004), (2004 – 2009)
- Preceded by: Marotrao Kowase
- Succeeded by: Dr. Namdeo Dalluji Usendi
- Constituency: Gadchiroli

Personal details
- Born: 1 July 1963 (age 63) Baradpavni, Narkhed Taluka, Nagpur district, Maharashtra
- Party: Bharatiya Janata Party
- Spouse: Archana (m. 1998)
- Children: Akshata, Ashita, Arnav
- Education: Yashwantrao Chauhan Open University
- Occupation: Businessman, Politician

Ashok Mahadeorao Nete (born 1 July 1963) is member of the 16th Lok Sabha from Gadchiroli–Chimur (Lok Sabha constituency) in Maharashtra state of India associated with the Bharatiya Janata Party.

== Political career ==
He was member of Maharashtra Legislative Assembly twice: 1999–2004 and 2004–2009.

He contested 2009 Lok Sabha elections from Gadchiroli-Chimur constituency but lost to Marotrao Kowase of Indian National Congress who got 38.43% votes while Nete secured 35.025% votes. Subsequently he won from this constituency in 2014 and 2019 Lok Sabha election as BJP/NDA candidate.

== Personal life ==
Ashok Nete married Archana Warthe in 1998. They have two daughters Akshata and Ashita and a son Arnav.

== Positions held ==
=== Within BJP ===
- Taluka President, BJYM (1991–1994)
- President, ST Morcha Gadchiroli District BJP (1994–1997)
- Vice President, Gadchiroli District BJP (1997–1999)
- State Secretary, ST Morcha BJP, Maharashtra (1999–2001)
- State Secretary, BJP, Maharashtra (2001–2003)
- National Member, SC Morcha BJP, All India(2006–2009)
- State President, SC Morcha BJP Maharashtra (2009–2014)

=== Legislative ===
- Member, Maharashtra Legislative Assembly – 2 terms, since 1999 & 2004.
- Member 16th Lok Sabha in 2014, Gadchiroli–Chimur (Lok Sabha constituency)
