= Deorao Madguji Holi =

Indian politician

Deorao Holi

Member of Maharashtra Legislative Assembly
- In office 2014–2024
- Preceded by: Namdeo Dalluji Usendi
- Succeeded by: Milind Ramji Narote
- Constituency: Gadchiroli

Personal details
- Born: 10 December 1968 (age 57) Gadchiroli, Maharashtra, India
- Party: Bharatiya Janata Party
- Spouse: Binarani
- Children: Devashree, Dipesh
- Education: MBBS; Government Medical College, Nagpur
- Occupation: Doctor, Politician

Deorao Madguji Holi is a member of the 13th Maharashtra Legislative Assembly. He represents the Gadchiroli Assembly Constituency. He belongs to the Bharatiya Janata Party. He is a medical doctor. The second doctor elected from this constituency, reserved for a Scheduled Tribe candidate, after Saguna Talandi in 2009. His 2014 victory is amongst Vidarbha's top ten in terms of margin.
