= Sanjay Hanmantrao Puram =

Indian politician

Sanjay Puram

Member of the Maharashtra Legislative Assembly
- Incumbent
- Assumed office 2024
- Preceded by: Korote Sahasram Maroti
- Constituency: Amgaon
- In office 2014–2019
- Preceded by: Ramratanbapu Bharatbhapu Raut
- Succeeded by: Korote Sahasram Maroti
- Constituency: Amgaon

Sanjay Hanmantrao Puram is the member of the 15th Maharashtra Legislative Assembly. He representing the Amgaon Assembly constituency in Gadchiroli–Chimur Lok Sabha constituency. He belongs to the Bharatiya Janata Party.
