= Marotirao D. Tumpalliwar =

Indian politician

Marotirao D. Tumpalliwar (b 10 Jul 1910 d 15 Nov 1971) was an Indian politician who represented Bombay State in Rajya Sabha during 1956–62.

He was elected to Maharashtra State assembly for twice from Chimur in 1962 & 1967.

He died in 1971 and had two sons and two daughter.
