= Jogendra Kawade =

Indian politician

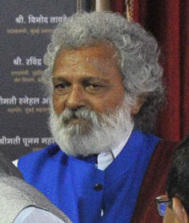
- Jogendra Kawade

Member of Maharashtra Legislative Council
- In office July 2014 – June 2020
- Constituency: Appointed By Governor

Member of parliament, Lok Sabha
- In office March 1998 – 6 October 1999
- Preceded by: Namdeo Harbaji Diwathe
- Succeeded by: Namdeo Harbaji Diwathe
- Constituency: Chimur

Personal details
- Born: 1 April 1943 (age 83) Nagpur, Maharashtra
- Party: Peoples Republican Party
- Spouse: Ranajana Kawade
- Children: 1 Son And 2 Daughters

Jogendra Laxman Kawade (born 1 April 1943, Nagpur) is an Indian politician, professor and social activist. He is the founder and president of the Peoples Republican Party. He is one of notable activists in Ambedkarite movement. Kawade is a former MP from Chimur Lok Sabha constituency of Maharashtra, serving in the 12th Lok Sabha during 1998–99. He is also a former member of Maharashtra Legislative Council (2014–20).
