= Krishna Damaji Gajbe =

Indian politician

Member of Maharashtra Legislative Assembly
- In office 2014–2024
- Preceded by: Anandrao Gedam
- Succeeded by: Ramdas Maluji Masram
- Constituency: Armori

Personal details
- Party: Bharatiya Janata Party

Krishna Damaji Gajbe is a member of the 13th Maharashtra Legislative Assembly. He represents the Armori Assembly Constituency. He belongs to the Bharatiya Janata Party.

Gajbe is from the Mana caste. Gajbe is a trader by profession, and describes himself as a common man. In his victory in the October, 2014 elections, he proved to be a "giant-killer" defeating two time Member of Legislative Assembly, Anandrao Gedam of the Indian National Congress.
