= Raje Vishveshvar Rao =

Raje Vishveshvar Rao Atram

Member of Parliament, Lok Sabha
- In office Mar 1977 – Aug 1979
- Preceded by: Abdul Shafee
- Succeeded by: Shantaram Potdukhe
- Constituency: Chandrapur

Member of Maharashtra Legislative Assembly
- In office (1957-1962), (1962 – 1967)
- Succeeded by: J. Y. Sakhare
- Constituency: Sironcha
- In office (1967-1972), (1972 – 1978)
- Succeeded by: Dewaji Madavi
- Constituency: Gadchiroli

Personal details
- Born: c. 1926 Aheri, (Maharashtra)
- Died: 27 March 1997 (aged 71)
- Citizenship: India
- Party: Bharatiya Lok Dal
- Relations: Raje Ambrishrao Raje Satyawan Rao Atram (grandson)
- Children: Raje Satyavanrao Raje Vishveshvarrao Atram (son)
- Profession: Raje & Politician

Raje Vishveshvar Rao Atram a.k.a. Raja Saheb, Aheri or Raje Saheb (c. 1926 – 27 March 1997) was an Indian Gond Raje (king) and politician. He was a Member of Parliament of India and was member of the 6th Lok Sabha. Raje Vishveshvar Rao represented the Chandrapur constituency of Maharashtra and was a member of the Bharatiya Lok Dal political party.

== Early life ==
Rao was born in Aheri, in the state of Maharashtra. Rao inherited the monarchy and became the Raje of Aheri.

== Political career ==
Rao joined politics after Indian independence. Rao held the position of MLA in the Maharashtra Legislative Assembly for three terms before becoming a Member of Parliament in the 6th Lok Sabha of India. He was a member of the Bharatiya Lok Dal political party.

== Posts held ==
#	From	To	Position
01	1962	1978	Member, Maharashtra Legislative Assembly (three terms)
02	1977	1979	Member, 6th Lok Sabha

== See also ==
- Raja & Monarchy in ancient India
- 6th Lok Sabha
- Lok Sabha
- Politics of India
- Parliament of India
- Government of India
- Bharatiya Lok Dal
- Chandrapur
