= Korote Sahasram Maroti =

Indian politician

Korote Sahasram Maroti (born 3 March 1970) is an Indian politician from Maharashtra. He is an MLA from Amgaon Assembly constituency which is reserved for Scheduled Tribe community in Gondia District. He won the 2019 Maharashtra Legislative Assembly election representing the Indian National Congress.

== Early life and education ==
Korote is from Amgaon, Gondia District, Maharashtra. He completed his B.A. in 2018 at Mumbai Hindi College.

== Career ==
Korote won from Amgaon Assembly constituency representing Indian National Congress in the 2019 Maharashtra Legislative Assembly election. He polled 88,265 votes and defeated his nearest rival and sitting MLA, Sanjay Hanmantrao Puram of Bharatiya Janata Party, by a margin of 7,420 votes.
