= Gondia Lok Sabha constituency =

Former constituency of the Indian parliament in Maharashtra

Coordinates: 21.5°N 80.2°E

Gondia
- Former Lok Sabha constituency

Constituency details
- Country: India
- Region: Western India
- State: Maharashtra
- Established: 1962
- Abolished: 1967
- Reservation: SC

Gondia Lok Sabha constituency was a Lok Sabha (Parliamentary) constituency of Maharashtra state in western India. This constituency was in existence during Lok Sabha elections of 1962 for the 3rd Lok Sabha. It was abolished from next 1967 Lok Sabha elections. It was reserved for Scheduled Caste candidate.

== Members of the Parliament ==
- 1952-1961: Constituency does not exist
- 1962: Balkrishna Ramchandra Wasnik, Indian National Congress (as Gondia (SC) ( Constituency no 34 of Maharashtra State ) )
- 1967 onwards: Constituency does not exist

See Bhandara Lok Sabha constituency

== See also ==
- Bhandara-Gondiya Lok Sabha constituency ( 2009 elections of 15th Lok Sabha onwards)
- Bhandara Lok Sabha constituency ( 1951 to 2004 elections for 1st to 14th Lok Sabha )
- Chimur Lok Sabha constituency
- List of former constituencies of the Lok Sabha
- Gondia district
- Bhandara district
