= Bramhapuri Assembly constituency =

Constituency of the Maharashtra legislative assembly in India

Coordinates: 20.61°N 79.86°E

Bramhapuri
- Constituency No. 73 for the Maharashtra Legislative Assembly

Constituency details
- Country: India
- Region: Western India
- State: Maharashtra
- District: Chandrapur
- Lok Sabha constituency: Gadchiroli-Chimur
- Established: 1952
- Total electors: 275,922
- Reservation: None

Member of Legislative Assembly
- 15th Maharashtra Legislative Assembly
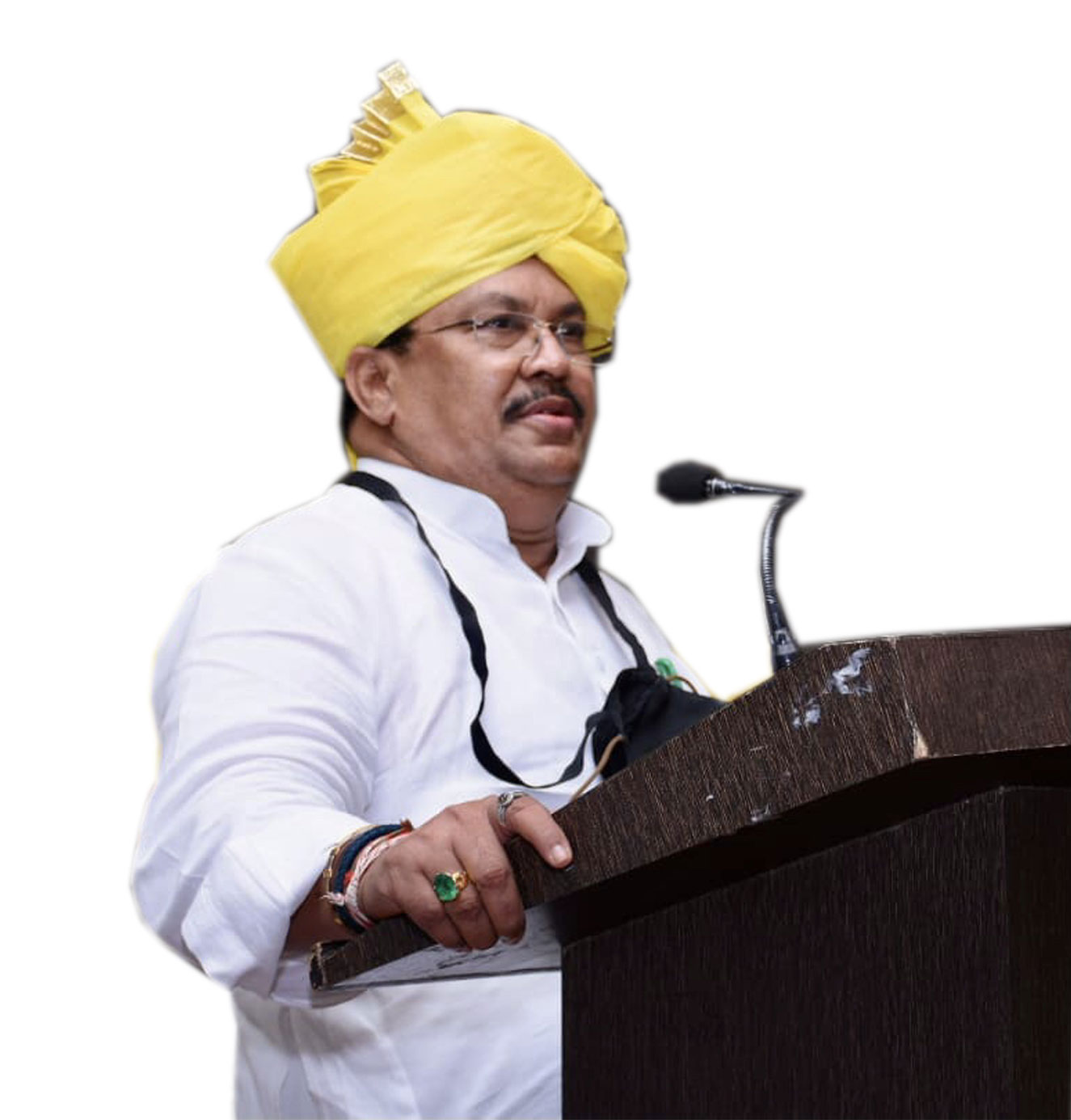
- Incumbent Vijay Namdevrao Wadettiwar
- Party: INC
- Alliance: MVA
- Elected year: 2024

Bramhapuri Assembly constituency (also spelled Brahmapuri) is one of the 288 Vidhan Sabha (legislative assembly) constituencies of Maharashtra state, western India. This constituency is located in Chandrapur district, and is part of Gadchiroli–Chimur (Lok Sabha constituency) since the 2009 elections.

== Geographical scope ==
The constituency comprises Sawali taluka, Sindewahi taluka, parts of Brahmapuri taluka revenue circles of Gangalwadi, Brahmapuri and Brahmapuri Municipal Council.

== Members of Legislative assembly ==
Year	Member	Party
1952	Nagmoti Murharirao Krishnarao	Indian National Congress
1957	Nagmoti Murharirao Krishnarao, Meshram Govind Bijaji (SC)	Indian National Congress
1962	Govinda Bijaji Meshram	Indian National Congress
1967	Gurpude Baliram Marotrao	Indian National Congress
1972	Gurpude Baliram Marotrao	Indian National Congress
1978	Bhendarkar Baburao Shrawanji	Indian National Congress
1980	Khanokar Suresh Chintamanrao	Independent politician
1985	Khanokar Suresh Chintamanrao	Indian Congress
1990	Donadkar Namdeo Bakaram	Shiv Sena
1995	Khanokar Suresh Chintamanrao	Janata Dal
1999	Uddhaorao Antaram Shingade	Bharatiya Janata Party
2004	Atul Devidas Deshkar	Bharatiya Janata Party
2009	Atul Devidas Deshkar	Bharatiya Janata Party
2014	Vijay Namdevrao Wadettiwar	Indian National Congress
2019	Vijay Namdevrao Wadettiwar	Indian National Congress
2024	Vijay Namdevrao Wadettiwar	Indian National Congress

Madhya Pradesh
Bombay State

== Election results ==
=== Assembly Election 2024 ===
2024 Maharashtra Legislative Assembly election : Bramhapuri
Party	Candidate	Votes	%	±%
INC	Vijay Namdevrao Wadettiwar	114,196	51.16%	▲0.88
BJP	Krishnalal Bajirao Sahare	100,225	44.90%	New
VBA	Dr. Rahul Kalidas Meshram	4,005	1.79%	▼2.16
BSP	Kevalram Vasudev Pardhi	1,808	0.81%	▼0.19
NOTA	None of the above	1,034	0.46%	▼0.11
Margin of victory		13,971	6.26%	▼3.38
Turnout		224,241	81.27%	▲9.74
Total valid votes		223,207		
Registered electors		275,922		▲1.97
INC hold		Swing	▲0.88	

=== Assembly Election 2019 ===
2019 Maharashtra Legislative Assembly election : Bramhapuri
Party	Candidate	Votes	%	±%
INC	Vijay Namdevrao Wadettiwar	96,726	50.28%	▲13.17
SS	Sandip Wamanrao Gaddamwar	78,177	40.64%	▲39.91
VBA	Chandralal Waktuji Meshram	7,608	3.95%	New
AAP	Adv. Paromita Goswami	3,596	1.87%	New
CPI	Vinod Ramdas Zodage	1,993	1.04%	▼0.22
BSP	Mukunda Dewaji Meshram	1,925	1.00%	▼3.02
NOTA	None of the above	1,099	0.57%	▼0.63
Margin of victory		18,549	9.64%	▲2.46
Turnout		193,550	71.53%	▼3.63
Total valid votes		192,369		
Registered electors		270,601		▲5.94
INC hold		Swing	▲13.17	

=== Assembly Election 2014 ===
2014 Maharashtra Legislative Assembly election : Bramhapuri
Party	Candidate	Votes	%	±%
INC	Vijay Namdevrao Wadettiwar	70,373	37.11%	▲16.98
BJP	Atul Devidas Deshkar	56,763	29.93%	▼3.55
NCP	Sandip Wamanrao Gaddamwar	44,878	23.66%	New
BSP	Kuthe Yograj Krushnaji	7,631	4.02%	▼0.83
CPI	Vinod Ramdas Zodage	2,385	1.26%	New
NOTA	None of the above	2,273	1.20%	New
Independent	Haridas Lahanuji Laade	1,500	0.79%	New
SS	Banbale Devidas Narayanrao	1,377	0.73%	New
Margin of victory		13,610	7.18%	▲3.53
Turnout		191,976	75.16%	▲8.19
Total valid votes		189,641		
Registered electors		255,431		▲13.77
INC gain from BJP		Swing	▲3.63	

=== Assembly Election 2009 ===
2009 Maharashtra Legislative Assembly election : Bramhapuri
Party	Candidate	Votes	%	±%
BJP	Atul Devidas Deshkar	50,340	33.48%	▼3.30
Independent	Gaddamwar Sandeep Wamanrao	44,845	29.82%	New
INC	Guddewar Pankaj Madhukar	30,265	20.13%	New
BSP	Urkude Nilkanth Pundalik	7,300	4.85%	▼5.80
RPI(A)	Ramteke Ashok Pandharinath	4,535	3.02%	New
Independent	Gajabe Rameshkumar Baburaoji	4,103	2.73%	New
SBP	Shukla Dinkar Indradatta	2,368	1.57%	New
Independent	Harane Vikas Shrihari	1,942	1.29%	New
Margin of victory		5,495	3.65%	▼6.20
Turnout		150,372	66.97%	▼5.29
Total valid votes		150,369		
Registered electors		224,521		▲12.70
BJP hold		Swing	▼3.30	

=== Assembly Election 2004 ===
2004 Maharashtra Legislative Assembly election : Bramhapuri
Party	Candidate	Votes	%	±%
BJP	Atul Devidas Deshkar	52,953	36.78%	▲1.94
NCP	Misar Damodhar Shravan	38,777	26.94%	New
Independent	Vasantbhau Narayanrao Warjurkar	23,949	16.64%	New
BSP	Mane Harish Kashinath	15,338	10.65%	New
GGP	Dr. Milind Nanaji Bhanare	3,949	2.74%	New
Independent	Borkute Hirachand Yadaorao	2,052	1.43%	New
BBM	Dr. Premlal Meshram	1,981	1.38%	New
SP	Adv. Sanjay Ramrao Thakare	1,854	1.29%	New
Margin of victory		14,176	9.85%	▼4.18
Turnout		143,954	72.26%	▼4.49
Total valid votes		143,954		
Registered electors		199,220		▲10.11
BJP hold		Swing	▲1.94	

=== Assembly Election 1999 ===
1999 Maharashtra Legislative Assembly election : Bramhapuri
Party	Candidate	Votes	%	±%
BJP	Uddhaorao Antaram Shingade	46,218	34.84%	▲8.42
RPI	Kamble Marotrao Rakhaduji	27,606	20.81%	New
Independent	Ashok Kisanlal Bhaiyya	24,946	18.80%	New
JD(S)	Khanokar Suresh Chintamanrao	8,655	6.52%	New
Independent	Adv. Govind Bauroji Bhendarkar	7,260	5.47%	New
Independent	Dighore Yashwant Zinguji	6,138	4.63%	New
Independent	Warjurkar Jageshwar Govindrao	3,347	2.52%	New
Independent	Meher Hariji Jairam	3,054	2.30%	New
Margin of victory		18,612	14.03%	▲12.18
Turnout		138,865	76.75%	▼9.60
Total valid votes		132,661		
Registered electors		180,934		▲1.51
BJP gain from JD		Swing	▲6.57	

=== Assembly Election 1995 ===
1995 Maharashtra Legislative Assembly election : Bramhapuri
Party	Candidate	Votes	%	±%
JD	Khanokar Suresh Chintamanrao	42,525	28.27%	New
BJP	Pazhode Vasudeorao Rushiji	39,737	26.42%	New
INC	Deshmukh Shantaram Tulshiramji	31,998	21.27%	New
BBM	Singam Waman Balkrushna	10,113	6.72%	New
Independent	Morande Nilkanth Gopalrao	4,225	2.81%	New
Independent	Urkude Manohar Marotrao	3,560	2.37%	New
Independent	Wadhai Tukaram Zingu	3,010	2.00%	New
Independent	Thengari Kashiram Sadashio	2,281	1.52%	New
Margin of victory		2,788	1.85%	▼15.93
Turnout		153,904	86.35%	▲12.34
Total valid votes		150,407		
Registered electors		178,234		▲10.44
JD gain from SS		Swing	▼5.57	

=== Assembly Election 1990 ===
1990 Maharashtra Legislative Assembly election : Bramhapuri
Party	Candidate	Votes	%	±%
SS	Donadkar Namdeo Bakaram	39,837	33.84%	New
Independent	Deshmukh Shantaram Tulshiramji	18,905	16.06%	New
INS(SCS)	Khanokar Suresh Chintamanrao	17,111	14.54%	New
RPI	Meshram Premlal Ramkisan	9,678	8.22%	▼6.00
Independent	Amale Kashinath Vithobaji	7,094	6.03%	New
Independent	Siddham Anand Shrihari	5,877	4.99%	New
Independent	Lade Haridas Lahanuji	3,924	3.33%	New
Independent	Wadhai Tukaram Zingu	3,765	3.20%	New
Margin of victory		20,932	17.78%	▲1.95
Turnout		119,438	74.01%	▼1.47
Total valid votes		117,709		
Registered electors		161,384		▲19.78
SS gain from IC(S)		Swing	▼7.40	

=== Assembly Election 1985 ===
1985 Maharashtra Legislative Assembly election : Bramhapuri
Party	Candidate	Votes	%	±%
IC(S)	Khanokar Suresh Chintamanrao	41,306	41.24%	New
Independent	Shriram Nanaji Bhoyar	25,456	25.42%	New
RPI	Premlal Ramkrushna Meshram	14,244	14.22%	New
INC	Jagnade Devidas Sheshrao	13,111	13.09%	New
Independent	Amale Kashinath Vithobaji	4,257	4.25%	New
Independent	Meshram Gajanan Tulshiram	796	0.79%	New
Margin of victory		15,850	15.83%	▼11.59
Turnout		101,694	75.48%	▼0.02
Total valid votes		100,157		
Registered electors		134,729		▲7.63
IC(S) gain from Independent		Swing	▼20.62	

=== Assembly Election 1980 ===
1980 Maharashtra Legislative Assembly election : Bramhapuri
Party	Candidate	Votes	%	±%
Independent	Khanokar Suresh Chintamanrao	57,242	61.86%	New
INC(I)	Dhammani Abdul Ajit Bhanjibhai	31,868	34.44%	▼26.93
Independent	Khobragade Charandas Pundlik	2,856	3.09%	New
Independent	Meshram Mahadeo Antaram	570	0.62%	New
Margin of victory		25,374	27.42%	▼9.22
Turnout		94,505	75.50%	▼2.33
Total valid votes		92,536		
Registered electors		125,175		▲5.78
Independent gain from INC(I)		Swing	▲0.49	

=== Assembly Election 1978 ===
1978 Maharashtra Legislative Assembly election : Bramhapuri
Party	Candidate	Votes	%	±%
INC(I)	Bhendarkar Baburao Shrawanji	54,717	61.37%	New
RPI	Kamble Marotrao Rakhaduji	22,053	24.74%	▲16.76
INC	Gurpude Baliram Marotrao	8,072	9.05%	▼35.34
Independent	Thakre Annaji Govindrao	3,155	3.54%	New
Independent	Kale Shantabai Damodhar	582	0.65%	New
Independent	Tupat Wasudeo Narayan	576	0.65%	New
Margin of victory		32,664	36.64%	▲12.77
Turnout		92,095	77.83%	▲7.57
Total valid votes		89,155		
Registered electors		118,334		▲15.27
INC(I) gain from INC		Swing	▲16.98	

=== Assembly Election 1972 ===
1972 Maharashtra Legislative Assembly election : Bramhapuri
Party	Candidate	Votes	%	±%
INC	Gurpude Baliram Marotrao	30,963	44.39%	▲5.98
Independent	Morande Nilkanth Gopalrao	14,312	20.52%	New
AIFB	Thengre Natthu Narayan	13,760	19.73%	New
RPI	Namdeorao Vishnuji Nagdovate	5,566	7.98%	▼11.50
Independent	Megharaj Gaikawad	4,289	6.15%	New
Independent	Thakre Raghunath Kashiram	862	1.24%	New
Margin of victory		16,651	23.87%	▲8.29
Turnout		72,124	70.26%	▼1.06
Total valid votes		69,752		
Registered electors		102,659		▲10.09
INC hold		Swing	▲5.98	

=== Assembly Election 1967 ===
1967 Maharashtra Legislative Assembly election : Bramhapuri
Party	Candidate	Votes	%	±%
INC	Gurpude Baliram Marotrao	23,125	38.41%	▼20.27
Independent	S. Jani	13,743	22.83%	New
RPI	M. R. Kamble	11,728	19.48%	New
PSP	S. B. Uike Babu	6,864	11.40%	New
Independent	K. S. Thengare	4,174	6.93%	New
Independent	Namdeorao Vishnuji Nagdovate	565	0.94%	New
Margin of victory		9,382	15.58%	▼11.57
Turnout		66,500	71.32%	▲12.01
Total valid votes		60,199		
Registered electors		93,247		▲28.17
INC hold		Swing	▼20.27	

=== Assembly Election 1962 ===
1962 Maharashtra Legislative Assembly election : Bramhapuri
Party	Candidate	Votes	%	±%
INC	Govinda Bijaji Meshram	23,114	58.68%	▲5.51
RPI	Namdeorao Vishnuji Nagdovate	12,419	31.53%	New
Independent	Shioram Lahu Chahande	3,855	9.79%	New
Margin of victory		10,695	27.15%	▲14.61
Turnout		43,153	59.31%	▼55.59
Total valid votes		39,388		
Registered electors		72,755		▼45.48
INC hold		Swing	▲30.27	

=== Assembly Election 1957 ===
1957 Bombay State Legislative Assembly election : Bramhapuri
Party	Candidate	Votes	%	±%
INC	Nagmoti Murharirao Krishnarao	43,558	28.41%	▼40.87
INC	Meshram Govind Bijaji	37,961	24.76%	▼44.52
SCF	Nagdeote Namdeo Visna	24,338	15.87%	▲8.00
ABJS	Borkar Balaji Deorao	21,843	14.25%	▲8.74
PSP	Nagarkatti. K. N	11,649	7.60%	New
PSP	Jambhulkar Baliram Dajiba	8,392	5.47%	New
Independent	Chunarkar Pandurang Antaram	5,578	3.64%	New
Margin of victory		19,220	12.54%	▼39.40
Turnout		153,319	114.90%	▲63.48
Total valid votes		153,319		
Registered electors		133,437		▲128.38
INC hold		Swing	▼40.87	

=== Assembly Election 1952 ===
1952 Hyderabad State Legislative Assembly election : Bramhapuri
Party	Candidate	Votes	%	±%
INC	Nagmoti Murharirao Krishnarao	20,814	69.28%	New
Socialist	Vithal Pisaram Bhanpurkar	5,210	17.34%	New
SCF	Hashyavinod Hari Damle	2,366	7.87%	New
ABJS	Vinayak Purushottam Pande	1,655	5.51%	New
Margin of victory		15,604	51.94%	
Turnout		30,045	51.42%	
Total valid votes		30,045		
Registered electors		58,427		
INC win (new seat)				
