= Laxmanrao Mankar =

Indian politician

Laxmanrao Mankar (b 1929) was an Indian politician, belonging to right wing Jana Sangh and its successor Bharatiya Janata Party.

He contested assembly elections from Amgaon in 1962,1967, 1972, emerging victorious in 1967. He was a member of the 6th Lok Sabha of India (1977–1980) from Bhandara constituency of Maharashtra. He was the losing candidate from Bhandara in 1980 and 1985 for Bharatiya Janata Party.

== Political career ==
Laxmanrao Mankar is a member of the Rashtriya Swayamsevak Sangh (RSS), a far-right Hindu nationalist paramilitary volunteer organisation.
