= Namdeo Kirsan =

Indian politician

Dr. Namdeo Kirsan

Member of Parliament, Lok Sabha
- Incumbent
- Assumed office 4 June 2024
- Preceded by: Ashok Nete
- Constituency: Gadchiroli- Chimur

Personal details
- Born: Namdeo Dasaram Kirsan; 24 May 1958 (age 67) Govindpur, Nagbhid Taluka, Chandrapur District
- Party: Indian National Congress
- Spouse: Nalini Namdeo Kirsan
- Parent(s): Dasaram Kirsan, Jasoda Bai

Dr.Namdeo Dasaram Kirsan is an Indian politician and the elected candidate for Lok Sabha from Gadchiroli–Chimur Lok Sabha constituency. He is a member of the Indian National Congress. He is a notable scholar who holds various degrees across different fields. He is a member of Parliamentary standing committee on Energy and Consultative Committee on Commerce & Industry.

== See also ==
- 18th Lok Sabha
- Indian National Congress
