= Chimur Lok Sabha constituency =

Constituency of the Indian parliament in Maharashtra

Coordinates: 20.5°N 79.4°E

Chimur
- Former Lok Sabha constituency

Constituency details
- Country: India
- Region: Western India
- State: Maharashtra
- Established: 1967
- Abolished: 2009
- Reservation: None

Chimur is a Lok Sabha parliamentary constituency of Maharashtra since 1967. Before that, the area were broadly represented as Bhandara Lok Sabha constituency as it is two-seat constituency during 1951 and 1957 elections. During 1962 elections Gondia Lok Sabha constituency comes in existence and abolished before 1967 to come as Chimur in 1967. After delimitation of 2008, it comes as Gadchiroli-Chimur Lok Sabha constituency for 2009 elections to 15th Lok Sabha.

== Members of Lok Sabha ==
Year	Member	Party
1952-67 : Constituency did not exist
1967	Ramchandra Martand Hajarnavis	Indian National Congress
1971	Krishnarao Thakur	Indian National Congress
1977	Krishnarao Thakur	Indian National Congress
1980	Vilas Muttemwar	Indian National Congress
1984	Vilas Muttemwar	Indian National Congress
1989	Mahadeo Shivankar	Bharatiya Janata Party
1991	Vilas Muttemwar	Indian National Congress
1996	Namdeo Diwathe	Bharatiya Janata Party
1998	Jogendra Kawade	Republican Party of India
1999	Namdeo Diwathe	Bharatiya Janata Party
2004	Mahadeo Shivankar	Bharatiya Janata Party
2008 onwards : See Gadchiroli-Chimur Lok Sabha constituency

== See also ==
- Chimur
- Gadchiroli-Chimur Lok Sabha constituency (2009 elections to 15th Lok Sabha onwards )
- Bhandara Lok Sabha constituency (See 1952 - 1957 elections to 1st and 2nd Lok Sabha )
- Gondia Lok Sabha constituency ( 1962 election to 3rd Lok Sabha )
- List of constituencies of the Lok Sabha
