= Raje Ambrishrao Raje Satyawan Rao Atram =

Indian politician

Raje Ambrishrao Atram

Member of Maharashtra Legislative Assembly
- In office October 2014 – October 2019
- Preceded by: Deepak Dada Atram
- Succeeded by: Dharamrao Baba Atram
- Constituency: Aheri-Sironcha

Personal details
- Born: 15 October 1985 (age 41) Aheri, Gadchiroli, Maharashtra
- Party: Bharatiya Janata Party
- Other political affiliations: Nag Vidarbha Andolan Samiti
- Relations: Kumar Avdheshrao Atram (brother)
- Parent: Rani Rukmini Devi (mother)
- Education: Business Law and HRM Level 4 Birmingham City University
- Occupation: Legislator

Raje Ambrishrao Raje Satyawan Rao Atram (born 15 October 1985) is a member of the 13th Maharashtra Legislative Assembly. He represents the Aheri Assembly Constituency, in the Gadchiroli district of Maharashtra. He belongs to the Bharatiya Janata Party. He was the State Minister of Tribal Development, Forests & Gadchiroli Guardian minister for Maharashtra State Government

== Education and early career ==
Raje Ambrishrao has done Business Law and HRM Level 4, Birmingham City University, Birmingham Business School (University of Birmingham), Passing year 2006.

== Family and personal life ==
His father was from Nag Vidarbha Andolan Samiti after his death amrishrao joined Bharatiya Janata Party and after being elected for first time in 2014-19, He got major ministries as well as Guardian Minister of Gadchiroli district.

== See also ==
- First Fadnavis ministry
- Make in India

Political offices
Preceded by	State Minister of Tribal Development, Forests & Guardian Minister for Maharashtra State. December 2014–present	Incumbent
Preceded by R R Patil	Maharashtra State Guardian Minister for Gadchiroli district December 2014–present	Incumbent
