= Ramdas Maluji Masram =

Indian politician

Member of the Maharashtra Legislative Assembly
- Incumbent
- Assumed office 2024
- Preceded by: Krishna Damaji Gajbe
- Constituency: Armori

Personal details
- Party: Indian National Congress
- Profession: Politician

Ramdas Masram is an Indian politician from Maharashtra. He is a member of the Maharashtra Legislative Assembly from 2024, representing Armori Assembly constituency as a member of the Indian National Congress.

== See also ==
- List of chief ministers of Maharashtra
- Maharashtra Legislative Assembly
