= Bunty Bhangdiya =

Indian politician

KirtiKumar Bhangdiya
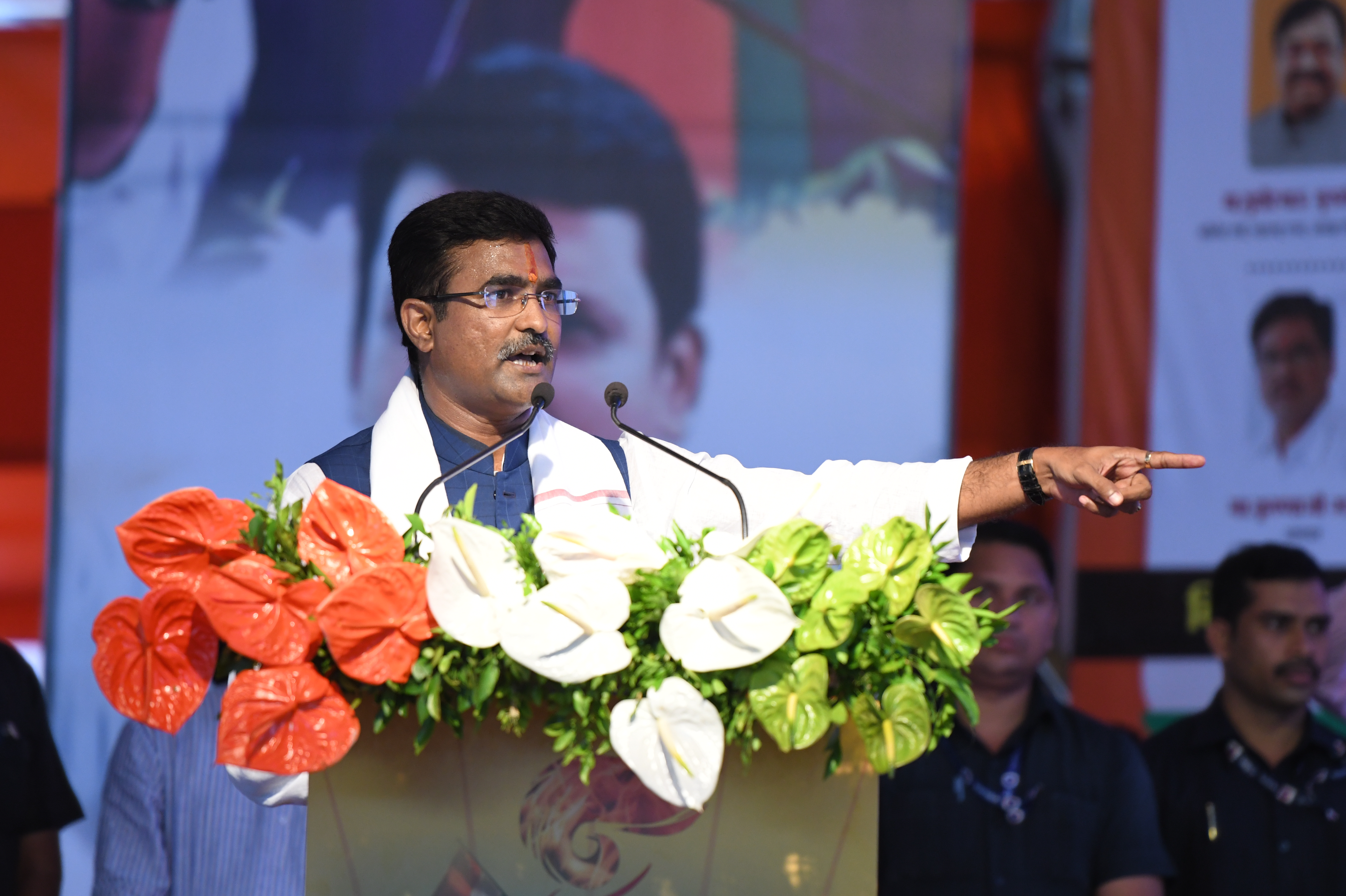
- Bhangdiya during Chimur Kranti Day

Member of Maharashtra Legislative Assembly
- Incumbent
- Assumed office (2014-2019), (2019-2024), (2024-Present)
- Preceded by: Vijay Namdevrao Wadettiwar
- Constituency: Chimur

Personal details
- Born: Chimur, Maharashtra, India
- Party: Bharatiya Janata Party (2014-present)
- Parent: Mitesh Bhangdiya
- Occupation: Politician

KirtiKumar Mitesh Bhangdiya, also known as Bunty Bhau Bhangdiya, is an Indian politician serving as a 15th Member of the Maharashtra Legislative Assembly. He represents the Chimur Assembly Constituency and is a member of the Bharatiya Janata Party (BJP). He was the richest candidate from Vidarbha in the 2014 elections. He was elected as an MLA for three consecutive terms in the 2014, 2019, and 2024 Maharashtra Legislative Assembly elections.

Bhangdiya was founder and head of Yuvashakti Sanghatna, a political organisation that held power in the Gadchiroli Zilla Parishad in 2014. In August 2014, Bhangdiya joined the BJP.

Bhangdiya's father, Mitesh Bhangdiya, who also belongs to the BJP, was a member of Maharashtra Legislative Council from the Chandrapur- Gadchiroli- Wardha local body constituency from 2012 to 2018. He is amongst the leading irrigation contractors in the Vidarbha-Marathwada region.

On 21 August 2017, Bhangdiya and several of his supporters were charged with assaulting an Indian National Congress leader and several of his supporters in Chimur. Bhangdiya is considered to be close to Devendra Fadnavis. .

== Political career ==
Bunty Bhau Bhangdiya is a member of the Rashtriya Swayamsevak Sangh (RSS), since his childhood a far-right Hindu nationalist paramilitary volunteer organisation.

Member of the Legislative Assembly (MLA), Chimur (2014–present)

=== 2014 ===
In the 2014 Maharashtra Legislative Assembly election, Bhangdiya was elected as the MLA from the Chimur constituency, representing the Bharatiya Janata Party (BJP). He secured 87,377 votes, accounting for a 44.7% vote share.

=== 2019 ===
He was re-elected as the MLA from Chimur in the 2019 Maharashtra Legislative Assembly election. He received 87,146 votes, with a vote share of 42.3%.

=== 2024 ===
In the 2024 Maharashtra Legislative Assembly election, he won a third consecutive term from Chimur. He secured a total of 116,495 votes, including 115,863 votes from electronic voting machines and 632 postal votes, achieving a vote share of 50.25%.
