= Aheri Assembly constituency =

Constituency of the Maharashtra legislative assembly in India

Coordinates: 19.41°N 80.01°E

Aheri
- Constituency No. 69 for the Maharashtra Legislative Assembly

Constituency details
- Country: India
- Region: Western India
- State: Maharashtra
- District: Gadchiroli
- Lok Sabha constituency: Gadchiroli-Chimur
- Established: 1951
- Total electors: 251,537
- Reservation: ST

Member of Legislative Assembly
- 15th Maharashtra Legislative Assembly
- Incumbent Dharamraobaba Bhagwantrao Aatram
- Party: NCP
- Alliance: NDA
- Elected year: 2024

Aheri Assembly constituency is one of the 288 Vidhan Sabha (legislative assembly) constituencies of Maharashtra state, western India. This constituency is located in Gadchiroli district. The delimitation of the constituency happened in 2008.

== Geographical scope ==
The constituency comprises Aheri, Bhamragad, Etapalli, Mulchera and Sironcha.

== Members of the Legislative assembly ==
Year	Member	Party
1957	Raje Vishveshvar Rao Atram (St)	Independent politician
1957	Weakey Narayansinh Sampatsinh (St)	Praja Socialist Party
1962	Raje Vishveshvar Rao Atram	Independent politician
1967	J. Y. Sakhare	Independent politician
1972	Mukundrao Vithoba Alone	Indian National Congress
1978	Bhagwanshaha Jiwanshaha Meshram	Independent politician
1980	Penta Rama Talandi	Indian National Congress
1985	Raje Satyavanrao Raje Vishveshvarrao Atram	Independent politician
1990	Dharamraobaba Bhagwantrao Atram	Indian National Congress
1995	Raje Satyavanrao Raje Vishveshvarrao Atram	Nag Vidarbha Andolan Samiti
1999	Dharamraobaba Bhagwantrao Atram	Gondwana Ganatantra Party
2004	Dharamraobaba Bhagwantrao Atram	Nationalist Congress Party
Before 2009 : See Sironcha
2009	Deepak Dada Atram	Independent
2014	Raje Ambrishrao Raje Satyawan Rao Atram	Bharatiya Janata Party
2019	Dharamrao Baba Atram	Nationalist Congress Party
2024	Dharamrao Baba Atram	Nationalist Congress Party

== Election results ==
=== Assembly Election 2024 ===
2024 Maharashtra Legislative Assembly election : Aheri
Party	Candidate	Votes	%	±%
NCP	Dharamrao Baba Atram	54,206	30.11%	New
Independent	Raje Ambrishrao Raje Satyawan Rao Atram	37,392	20.77%	New
NCP-SP	Bhagyashree Dharamraobaba Atram	35,765	19.87%	New
Independent	Hanmantu Gangaram Madavi	27,188	15.10%	New
Independent	Deepak Dada Atram	6,606	3.67%	New
NOTA	None of the Above	5,825	3.24%	▼0.35
Margin of victory		16,814	9.34%	▼0.29
Turnout		185,864	73.89%	▲3.67
Total valid votes		180,039		
Registered electors		251,537		▲6.37
NCP hold		Swing	▼7.26	

=== Assembly Election 2019 ===
2019 Maharashtra Legislative Assembly election : Aheri
Party	Candidate	Votes	%	±%
NCP	Dharamrao Baba Atram	60,013	37.37%	▲11.96
BJP	Raje Ambrishrao Raje Satyawan Rao Atram	44,555	27.74%	▼11.46
INC	Deepak Dada Atram	43,022	26.79%	▲23.83
NOTA	None of the Above	5,765	3.59%	New
BSP	Madhukar Yashwant Sadmek	3,623	2.26%	▼0.34
VBA	Adv. Lalsu Soma Nogoti	2,394	1.49%	New
Independent	Kailashbhau Ganpat Koret	2,279	1.42%	New
Independent	Dinesh Eshwarshah Madavi	2,091	1.30%	New
Margin of victory		15,458	9.63%	▼4.17
Turnout		166,387	70.36%	▲1.09
Total valid votes		160,593		
Registered electors		236,478		▲9.81
NCP gain from BJP		Swing	▼1.84	

=== Assembly Election 2014 ===
2014 Maharashtra Legislative Assembly election : Aheri
Party	Candidate	Votes	%	±%
BJP	Raje Ambrishrao Raje Satyawan Rao Atram	56,418	39.21%	▲33.25
NCP	Dharamrao Baba Atram	36,560	25.41%	▼3.43
Independent	Deepak Dada Atram	33,555	23.32%	New
NOTA	None of the Above	7,349	5.11%	New
INC	Mukteshwar Lachama Gawde	4,253	2.96%	New
BSP	Raghunath Gajanan Talande	3,737	2.60%	▼0.45
Independent	Kailash Ganpat Koret	3,113	2.16%	New
Independent	Madavi Dinesh Ishwarshaha	2,706	1.88%	New
Margin of victory		19,858	13.80%	▼6.00
Turnout		151,279	70.24%	▲0.23
Total valid votes		143,897		
Registered electors		215,360		▲12.67
BJP gain from Independent		Swing	▼9.42	

=== Assembly Election 2009 ===
2009 Maharashtra Legislative Assembly election : Aheri
Party	Candidate	Votes	%	±%
Independent	Deepak Dada Atram	61,894	48.63%	New
NCP	Dharamrao Baba Atram	36,697	28.83%	New
Independent	Madavi Santosh Gattu	8,036	6.31%	New
BJP	Bajirao Mituji Kumare	7,583	5.96%	New
BSP	Atram Santosh Mallaji	3,884	3.05%	New
Independent	Talandi Bapu Bonda	3,295	2.59%	New
Independent	Gawade Venkati Penta	3,047	2.39%	New
Margin of victory		25,197	19.80%	
Turnout		127,406	66.65%	
Total valid votes		127,272		
Registered electors		191,149		
Independent win (new seat)				
