= Marotrao Kowase =

Indian politician (born 1949)

Member of Parliament, Lok Sabha
- In office 1 June 2009 – 16 May 2014
- Succeeded by: Ashok Nete
- Constituency: Gadchiroli-Chimur

Member of Maharashtra Legislative Assembly
- In office (1980-1985), (1990-1995), (1995 – 1999)
- Preceded by: Dewaji Madavi
- Succeeded by: Ashok Nete
- Constituency: Gadchiroli

Personal details
- Born: 3 November 1949 (age 76) Bhadbhidi, Chamorshi Taluka, Gadchiroli district
- Party: Indian National Congress
- Spouse: Latatai Kowase
- Children: 1 son and 3 daughters

Marotrao Sainuji Kowase (born 3 November 1949) is an Indian politician and a member of the 15th Lok Sabha of India. He represents the Gadchiroli-Chimur constituency of Maharashtra and is a member of the Indian National Congress (INC) political party.

He was member of Legislative Assembly of Maharashtra State during 1980–85, 1990–95 and 1995–1999. He was the Minister of State for Tribal Welfare in the Maharashtra State Government led by Sharad Pawar.

He has been elected from the Gadchiroli-Chimur Lok Sabha Constituency as a member of the 15th Lok Sabha, the results of which were declared on 16 May 2009.

Kowase belongs to a tribal family and hails from Bhadbhidi, which is a small village in Chamorshi Tehsil of Gadchiroli District. He has done his Master of Arts in political science.
