= Peoples Republican Party =

Political party in India

- Abbreviation: PRP
- Leader: Jogendra Kawade
- Ideology: Ambedkarism

Party flag

The Peoples Republican Party, also known as Republican Party of India (Kawade), is a political party in India. PRP is a splinter group of B. R. Ambedkar's Republican Party of India. The leader of the party is Jogendra Kawade. PRP's presence is limited to Maharashtra among Dalits. Kawade's party had supported Bharatiya Janata Party leader Nitin Gadkari in Maharashtra Legislative Council election. In 2022 it supported the Congress Party but discontinued this alliance in the first week of October 2022.

Recently in January 2023 party tied up with BSS-BJP alliance in Maharashtra and become part Eknath Shinde led Mahayuti alliance.

Recently, all factions of RPI except Prakash Ambedkar's Bharipa Bahujan Mahasangha reunited to form a united Republican Party of India. Peoples Republican Party is also merged in this united RPI. However senior RPI leader Ramdas Athavle and his faction left the United RPI alliance after the Vidhan Sabha elections and joined hands with Shivsena -BJP.

Jogendra Kawade criticised Ramdas Athawale for joining hands with right wing alliance of Shivsena - BJP. He also announced that his party will continue to be part of Third Front popularly known as RIDALOS.
