= Gadchiroli Assembly constituency =

Constituency of the Maharashtra legislative assembly in India

Coordinates: 20.19°N 80.00°E

Gadchiroli
- Constituency No. 68 for the Maharashtra Legislative Assembly

Constituency details
- Country: India
- Region: Western India
- State: Maharashtra
- District: Gadchiroli
- Lok Sabha constituency: Gadchiroli-Chimur
- Established: 1955
- Total electors: 307,464
- Reservation: ST

Member of Legislative Assembly
- 15th Maharashtra Legislative Assembly
- Incumbent Milind Ramji Narote
- Party: BJP
- Alliance: NDA
- Elected year: 2024

Gadchiroli Assembly constituency is one of the 288 Vidhan Sabha (legislative assembly) constituencies of Maharashtra state, western India. This constituency is located in Gadchiroli district. The delimitation of the constituency happened in 2008.

== Geographical scope ==
The constituency comprises Gadchiroli taluka, Chamorshi taluka, parts of Dhanora Tehsil viz. revenue circles Dhanora and Chatgaon.

== Members of the Legislative Assembly ==
| Year | Name | Party |
|---|---|---|
| 1967 | Raje Vishveshvar Rao Atram | Independent politician |
| 1972 | Raje Vishveshvar Rao Atram | Independent politician |
| 1978 | Madavi Dewaji Tanu | Indian National Congress |
| 1980 | Marotrao Sainuji Kowase | Indian National Congress |
| 1985 | Warkhadde Hiraman Benduji | Janata Party |
| 1990 | Marotrao Sainuji Kowase | Indian National Congress |
| 1995 | Marotrao Sainuji Kowase | Indian National Congress |
| 1999 | Ashok Nete | Bharatiya Janata Party |
| 2004 | Ashok Nete | Bharatiya Janata Party |
| 2009 | Dr. Namdeo Dalluji Usendi | Indian National Congress |
| 2014 | Dr. Deorao Madguji Holi | Bharatiya Janata Party |
| 2019 | Dr. Deorao Madguji Holi | Bharatiya Janata Party |
| 2024 | Dr. Milind Ramji Narote | Bharatiya Janata Party |

== Election results ==
=== Assembly Election 2024 ===
2024 Maharashtra Legislative Assembly election : Gadchiroli
| Party | Candidate | Votes | % | ±% |
|---|---|---|---|---|
| BJP | Dr. Milind Ramji Narote | 116,540 | 50.78% | ▲0.32 |
| INC | Manohar Tulshiram Poreti | 101,035 | 44.02% | ▲11.77 |
| PWPI | Jayashri Vijay Velada | 3,362 | 1.46% | ▼0.53 |
| BSP | Sanjay Subhash Kumre | 3,241 | 1.41% | ▼0.65 |
| NOTA | None of the Above | 2,817 | 1.23% | ▲0.06 |
| VBA | Bharat Mangaruji Yerme | 1,852 | 0.81% | ▼2.66 |
| Independent | Dr. Sonal Chetan Kowe | 1,552 | 0.68% | New |
| Margin of victory | | 15,505 | 6.76% | ▼11.46 |
| Turnout | | 232,320 | 75.56% | ▲6.82 |
| Total valid votes | | 229,503 | | |
| Registered electors | | 307,464 | | ▲7.48 |
| BJP hold | | Swing | ▲0.32 | |

=== Assembly Election 2019 ===
2019 Maharashtra Legislative Assembly election : Gadchiroli
| Party | Candidate | Votes | % | ±% |
|---|---|---|---|---|
| BJP | Dr. Deorao Madguji Holi | 97,913 | 50.46% | ▲1.95 |
| INC | Dr. Chanda Nitin Kodwate | 62,572 | 32.25% | ▲20.36 |
| VBA | Gopal Kashinath Magare | 6,735 | 3.47% | New |
| BSP | Akshamlal Palalal Shidam | 3,999 | 2.06% | ▼7.46 |
| PWPI | Jayshree Vijay Welda | 3,870 | 1.99% | New |
| Sambhaji Brigade Party | Dilip Kisan Madavi | 3,256 | 1.68% | New |
| Independent | Sagar Bharat Kumbhre | 3,179 | 1.64% | New |
| NOTA | None of the Above | 2,273 | 1.17% | ▼10.93 |
| Margin of victory | | 35,341 | 18.21% | ▼17.66 |
| Turnout | | 196,437 | 68.67% | ▲15.63 |
| Total valid votes | | 194,025 | | |
| Registered electors | | 286,057 | | ▲3.20 |
| BJP hold | | Swing | ▲1.95 | |

=== Assembly Election 2014 ===
2014 Maharashtra Legislative Assembly election : Gadchiroli
| Party | Candidate | Votes | % | ±% |
|---|---|---|---|---|
| BJP | Dr. Deorao Madguji Holi | 70,185 | 48.51% | ▲5.57 |
| NCP | Atram Bhagyashri Dharmraobaba | 18,280 | 12.63% | New |
| NOTA | None of the Above | 17,510 | 12.10% | New |
| INC | Saguna Pentaji Talandi | 17,208 | 11.89% | ▼31.67 |
| SS | Kesari Rushiji Usendi | 14,892 | 10.29% | New |
| BSP | Vilas Shamrao Kodape | 13,780 | 9.52% | ▲1.50 |
| BBM | Alam Kusum Harba | 2,143 | 1.48% | New |
| Independent | Jayashri Welda | 1,943 | 1.34% | New |
| Margin of victory | | 51,905 | 35.87% | ▲35.26 |
| Turnout | | 162,494 | 58.62% | ▼13.06 |
| Total valid votes | | 144,683 | | |
| Registered electors | | 277,193 | | ▲16.66 |
| BJP gain from INC | | Swing | ▲4.95 | |

=== Assembly Election 2009 ===
2009 Maharashtra Legislative Assembly election : Gadchiroli
| Party | Candidate | Votes | % | ±% |
|---|---|---|---|---|
| INC | Dr. Namdeo Dalluji Usendi | 67,542 | 43.56% | ▲8.19 |
| BJP | Ashok Mahadeorao Nete | 66,582 | 42.94% | ▲0.82 |
| BSP | Mangalabai Sudhakar Borkar | 12,446 | 8.03% | ▼2.83 |
| Independent | Bhagwan Madhukar Gedam | 3,990 | 2.57% | New |
| Independent | Diwakar Gulab Pendam | 1,821 | 1.17% | New |
| GGP | Sidam Chandrashekhar Vitthal | 998 | 0.64% | ▼0.85 |
| Margin of victory | | 960 | 0.62% | ▼6.13 |
| Turnout | | 155,104 | 65.28% | ▼6.85 |
| Total valid votes | | 155,057 | | |
| Registered electors | | 237,610 | | ▲19.25 |
| INC gain from BJP | | Swing | ▲1.44 | |

=== Assembly Election 2004 ===
2004 Maharashtra Legislative Assembly election : Gadchiroli
| Party | Candidate | Votes | % | ±% |
|---|---|---|---|---|
| BJP | Ashok Nete | 60,516 | 42.12% | ▲1.81 |
| INC | Poreti Tulshiram Raoji | 50,823 | 35.37% | ▲1.95 |
| BSP | Dr Vinayak Samba Tumram | 15,595 | 10.85% | New |
| Independent | Dr. Holi Deorao Madguji | 12,623 | 8.79% | New |
| GGP | Shyamkant Motiramji Madavi | 2,141 | 1.49% | ▲0.60 |
| RLD | Madhaorao Parshuram Jambhule | 1,976 | 1.38% | New |
| Margin of victory | | 9,693 | 6.75% | ▼0.14 |
| Turnout | | 143,693 | 72.11% | ▲5.89 |
| Total valid votes | | 143,674 | | |
| Registered electors | | 199,256 | | ▲12.24 |
| BJP hold | | Swing | ▲1.81 | |

=== Assembly Election 1999 ===
1999 Maharashtra Legislative Assembly election : Gadchiroli
| Party | Candidate | Votes | % | ±% |
|---|---|---|---|---|
| BJP | Ashok Nete | 47,391 | 40.31% | ▲13.37 |
| INC | Kowase Marotrao Sainuji | 39,293 | 33.43% | ▼8.70 |
| NCP | Usendi Namdeo Dalluji | 17,787 | 15.13% | New |
| Independent | Kodap Vilas Shamrao | 9,772 | 8.31% | New |
| Nag Vidarbha Andolan Samiti | Kumbhare Kedarnath Ganpatrao | 2,266 | 1.93% | New |
| GGP | Anandabai Dewaji Madavi | 1,043 | 0.89% | New |
| Margin of victory | | 8,098 | 6.89% | ▼8.29 |
| Turnout | | 124,680 | 70.23% | ▼16.27 |
| Total valid votes | | 117,552 | | |
| Registered electors | | 177,526 | | ▲3.27 |
| BJP gain from INC | | Swing | ▼1.81 | |

=== Assembly Election 1995 ===
1995 Maharashtra Legislative Assembly election : Gadchiroli
| Party | Candidate | Votes | % | ±% |
|---|---|---|---|---|
| INC | Marotrao Sainuji Kowase | 59,732 | 42.13% | ▼1.17 |
| BJP | Kodap Vilas Shamrao | 38,211 | 26.95% | New |
| Independent | Naitam Kejuram Dayaram | 11,652 | 8.22% | New |
| Independent | Warkhadde Hiraman Benduji | 7,298 | 5.15% | New |
| Independent | Kumre Bajirao Mitthuji | 6,190 | 4.37% | New |
| BSP | Kinake Moreshwar Ramchandra | 4,455 | 3.14% | ▲2.31 |
| Independent | Taram Sitaram Madhao | 4,263 | 3.01% | New |
| Margin of victory | | 21,521 | 15.18% | ▲11.63 |
| Turnout | | 148,590 | 86.44% | ▲24.19 |
| Total valid votes | | 141,793 | | |
| Registered electors | | 171,898 | | ▲14.46 |
| INC hold | | Swing | ▼1.17 | |

=== Assembly Election 1990 ===
1990 Maharashtra Legislative Assembly election : Gadchiroli
| Party | Candidate | Votes | % | ±% |
|---|---|---|---|---|
| INC | Marotrao Sainuji Kowase | 37,903 | 43.29% | ▼1.12 |
| SS | Kodap Vilas Shamrao | 34,800 | 39.75% | New |
| JD | Warkhadde Hiraman Benduji | 7,896 | 9.02% | New |
| Independent | Kulmethe Parshuram Shrawan | 2,155 | 2.46% | New |
| Independent | Kodap Arunkumar Rambhau | 1,685 | 1.92% | New |
| BSP | Uike Arun Laxaman | 727 | 0.83% | New |
| Doordarshi Party | Kulmethe Madhaorao Bajirao | 620 | 0.71% | New |
| Margin of victory | | 3,103 | 3.54% | ▲2.15 |
| Turnout | | 90,212 | 60.07% | ▲6.04 |
| Total valid votes | | 87,549 | | |
| Registered electors | | 150,183 | | ▲26.47 |
| INC gain from JP | | Swing | ▼2.52 | |

=== Assembly Election 1985 ===
1985 Maharashtra Legislative Assembly election : Gadchiroli
| Party | Candidate | Votes | % | ±% |
|---|---|---|---|---|
| JP | Warkhadde Hiraman Benduji | 28,427 | 45.81% | New |
| INC | Kowase Marotrao Sainuji | 27,559 | 44.41% | New |
| Independent | Alam Lalaji Ganpatrao | 2,778 | 4.48% | New |
| Independent | Talandi Tikalabai Ramchandrarao | 1,709 | 2.75% | New |
| Independent | Meshram Bhagwanshaha Jiwanshaha | 1,580 | 2.55% | New |
| Margin of victory | | 868 | 1.40% | ▼28.46 |
| Turnout | | 64,266 | 54.12% | ▲9.76 |
| Total valid votes | | 62,053 | | |
| Registered electors | | 118,751 | | ▲12.63 |
| JP gain from INC(I) | | Swing | ▼10.42 | |

=== Assembly Election 1980 ===
1980 Maharashtra Legislative Assembly election : Gadchiroli
| Party | Candidate | Votes | % | ±% |
|---|---|---|---|---|
| INC(I) | Marotrao Sainuji Kowase | 25,192 | 56.23% | ▲11.92 |
| INC(U) | Meshram Bhagwanshaha Jiwanshaha | 11,814 | 26.37% | New |
| Independent | Madavi Lahuji Mangru | 7,797 | 17.40% | New |
| Margin of victory | | 13,378 | 29.86% | ▲26.36 |
| Turnout | | 46,100 | 43.72% | ▼17.78 |
| Total valid votes | | 44,803 | | |
| Registered electors | | 105,437 | | ▲6.33 |
| INC(I) hold | | Swing | ▲11.92 | |

=== Assembly Election 1978 ===
1978 Maharashtra Legislative Assembly election : Gadchiroli
| Party | Candidate | Votes | % | ±% |
|---|---|---|---|---|
| INC(I) | Madavi Dewaji Tanu | 26,485 | 44.31% | New |
| Independent | Atram Satyawanrao Raje Vishweshwarrao | 24,396 | 40.82% | New |
| INC | Sayam Raje Fattelal Shaha Raje Ranshaha | 4,435 | 7.42% | ▼33.54 |
| Independent | Kunjam Lakkhanshah Chhatarshah | 3,359 | 5.62% | New |
| Independent | Ataram Kirtimantrao Bhujangrao | 1,097 | 1.84% | New |
| Margin of victory | | 2,089 | 3.49% | ▼13.00 |
| Turnout | | 62,229 | 62.75% | ▲4.29 |
| Total valid votes | | 59,772 | | |
| Registered electors | | 99,163 | | ▲28.48 |
| INC(I) gain from Independent | | Swing | ▼13.15 | |

=== Assembly Election 1972 ===
1972 Maharashtra Legislative Assembly election : Gadchiroli
| Party | Candidate | Votes | % | ±% |
|---|---|---|---|---|
| Independent | Raje Vishveshvar Rao | 24,832 | 57.46% | New |
| INC | Madavi Dewaji Tanu | 17,702 | 40.96% | ▲16.37 |
| Independent | Kashinath Bisan Sedakme | 679 | 1.57% | New |
| Margin of victory | | 7,130 | 16.50% | ▼28.29 |
| Turnout | | 46,473 | 60.21% | ▲5.19 |
| Total valid votes | | 43,213 | | |
| Registered electors | | 77,184 | | ▲15.64 |
| Independent hold | | Swing | ▼11.92 | |

=== Assembly Election 1967 ===
1967 Maharashtra Legislative Assembly election : Gadchiroli
| Party | Candidate | Votes | % | ±% |
|---|---|---|---|---|
| Independent | Raje Vishveshvar Rao | 23,524 | 69.39% | New |
| INC | Maroti Rughoba Naroti | 8,338 | 24.59% | New |
| Independent | N. S. Uike | 2,040 | 6.02% | New |
| Margin of victory | | 15,186 | 44.79% | |
| Turnout | | 37,010 | 55.45% | |
| Total valid votes | | 33,902 | | |
| Registered electors | | 66,743 | | |
| Independent gain from INC | | Swing | | |
