= Milind Ramji Narote =

Indian politician

Milind Ramji Narote (born 30 July 1985) is an Indian politician from Maharashtra. He is a member of the Maharashtra Legislative Assembly from Gadchiroli Assembly constituency, which is reserved for Scheduled Tribe community, in Gadchiroli district. He won the 2024 Maharashtra Legislative Assembly election, representing the Bharatiya Janata Party.

== Early life and education ==
Narote is from Gadchiroli, Maharashtra. He is the son of Ramji Narote. He completed his MBBS in 2012 at NPK SIMS, Nagpur.

== Career ==
Narote is a first time MLA winning from Gadchiroli Assembly constituency representing the Bharatiya Janata Party in the 2024 Maharashtra Legislative Assembly election. He polled 116,540 votes and defeated his nearest rival, Manohar Tulshiram Poreti of the Indian National Congress, by a margin of 15,505 votes.
