= Chimur Assembly constituency =

Constituency of the Maharashtra legislative assembly in India

Coordinates: 20.50°N 79.37°E

Chimur
- Constituency No. 74 for the Maharashtra Legislative Assembly

Constituency details
- Country: India
- Region: Western India
- State: Maharashtra
- District: Chandrapur
- Lok Sabha constituency: Gadchiroli-Chimur
- Established: 1962
- Total electors: 281,018
- Reservation: None

Member of Legislative Assembly
- 15th Maharashtra Legislative Assembly
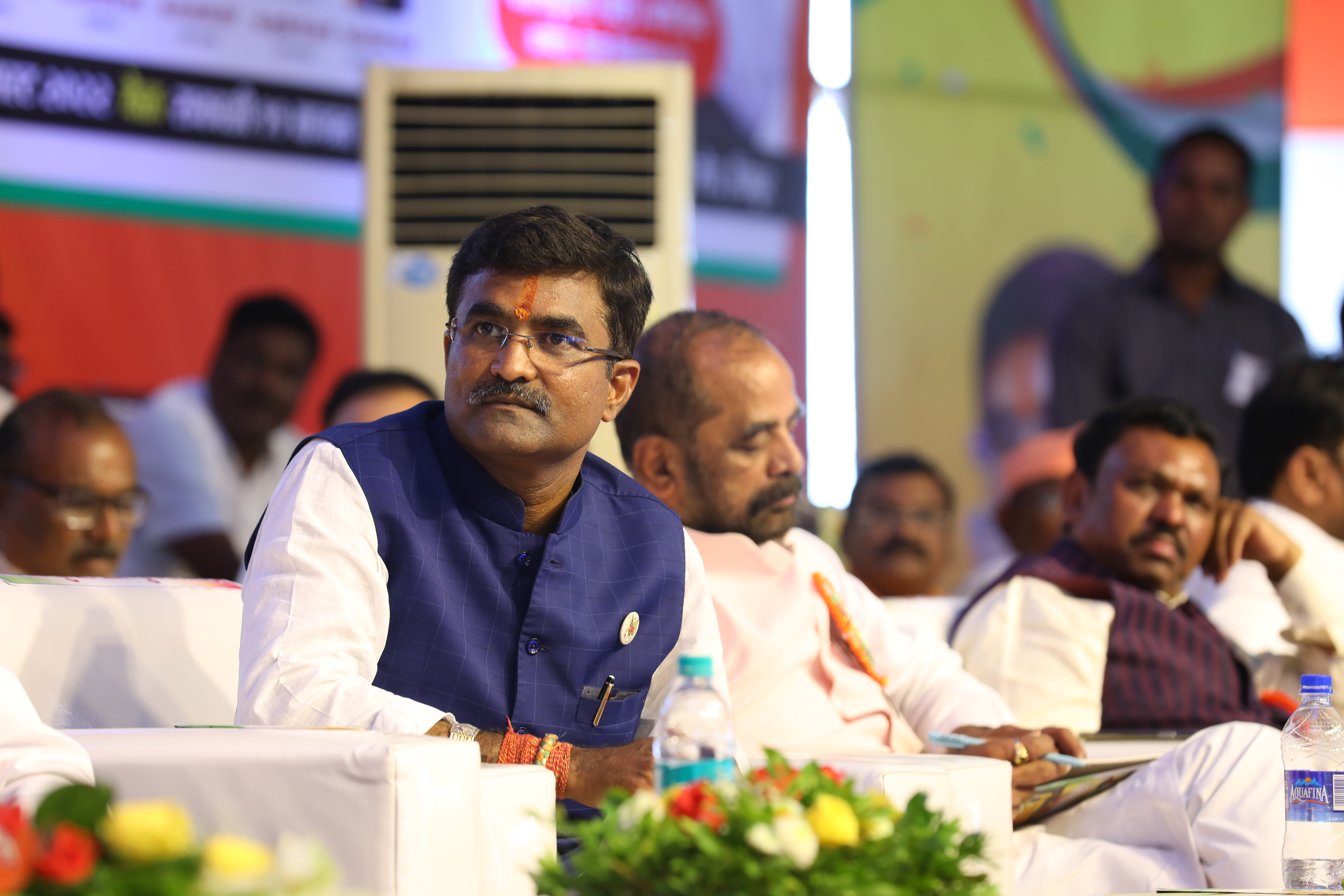
- Incumbent Bunty Bhangdiya
- Party: BJP
- Alliance: NDA
- Elected year: 2024

Chimur Assembly Constituency is one of the 288 Vidhan Sabha (Legislative Assembly) constituencies of Maharashtra state, western India. This constituency is located in Chandrapur district. The delimitation of the constituency happened in 2008.

== Geographical scope ==
The constituency comprises Chimur taluka, Nagbhir taluka and part of Brahmapuri taluka viz. revenue circle of Arher Navargaon.

== Members of Legislative Assembly ==
Year	Member	Party
1962	Marotirao D. Tumpalliwar	Indian National Congress
1967	Marotirao D. Tumpalliwar	Indian National Congress
1972	Motiram Birje	Indian National Congress
1978	Adakuji Sonwane	Indian National Congress (I)
1980	Yashodhara Bajaj	Indian National Congress (I)
1985	Bhujangrao Bagde	Indian National Congress
1990	Baburao Waghmare	Indian National Congress
1995	Dr. Rameshkumar Gajbe	Independent
1999	Dr. Avinash Manoharrao Warjukar	Indian National Congress
2004	Vijay Wadettiwar	Shiv Sena
2006^	Vijay Wadettiwar	Indian National Congress
2009	Vijay Wadettiwar	Indian National Congress
2014	Bunty Bhangdiya	Bharatiya Janata Party
2019	Bunty Bhangdiya	Bharatiya Janata Party
2024	Bunty Bhangdiya	Bharatiya Janata Party

== Election results ==
=== Assembly Election 2024 ===
2024 Maharashtra Legislative Assembly election : Chimur
Party	Candidate	Votes	%	±%
BJP	Bunty Bhangdiya	116,495	50.63%	▲8.32
INC	Satish Manoharrao Warjukar	106,642	46.35%	▲8.77
VBA	Arvind Atmaram Sadekar	3,956	1.72%	▼10.16
NOTA	None of the Above	1,725	0.75%	▼0.14
Margin of victory		9,853	4.28%	▼0.45
Turnout		231,820	82.49%	▲7.70
Total valid votes		230,095		
Registered electors		281,018		▲1.21
BJP hold		Swing	▲8.32	

=== Assembly Election 2019 ===
2019 Maharashtra Legislative Assembly election : Chimur
Party	Candidate	Votes	%	±%
BJP	Bunty Bhangdiya	87,146	42.31%	▼2.60
INC	Satish Manoharrao Warjukar	77,394	37.58%	▲5.59
VBA	Arvind Atmaram Sandekar	24,474	11.88%	New
Independent	Dhanraj Raghunath Mungale	11,339	5.51%	New
BSP	Subhash Narayan Petkar	2,239	1.09%	▼3.97
NOTA	None of the Above	1,835	0.89%	▲0.39
PWPI	Prakash Nakkal Nanhe	1,438	0.70%	New
Margin of victory		9,752	4.73%	▼8.20
Turnout		208,272	75.01%	▼0.03
Total valid votes		205,961		
Registered electors		277,652		▲5.92
BJP hold		Swing	▼2.60	

=== Assembly Election 2014 ===
2014 Maharashtra Legislative Assembly election : Chimur
Party	Candidate	Votes	%	±%
BJP	Bunty Bhangdiya	87,377	44.91%	▲10.17
INC	Dr. Avinash Manoharrao Warjukar	62,222	31.98%	▼20.87
SS	Gajanan Tukaram Butke	12,105	6.22%	New
BSP	Narendrakumar Gulabrao Dadmal	9,841	5.06%	▼1.57
MNS	Arvind Aatmaramji Sandekar	7,177	3.69%	New
NCP	Adv. Govind Baburao Bhendarkar	2,738	1.41%	New
Socialist	Qureshi Mohd. Ikalak Mohd. Yusuf	1,340	0.69%	New
NOTA	None of the Above	966	0.50%	New
Margin of victory		25,155	12.93%	▼5.18
Turnout		196,240	74.86%	▲2.45
Total valid votes		194,542		
Registered electors		262,142		▲11.28
BJP gain from INC		Swing	▼7.94	

=== Assembly Election 2009 ===
2009 Maharashtra Legislative Assembly election : Chimur
Party	Candidate	Votes	%	±%
INC	Vijay Namdevrao Wadettiwar	89,341	52.85%	▲4.18
BJP	Vasantbhau Narayan Warjurkar	58,725	34.74%	▼0.92
BSP	J. T. Lonbale	11,200	6.63%	New
Independent	Sandekar Arvind Atmaram	2,912	1.72%	New
RPI(A)	Adv.Dadmal Prabhakar Mahaguji	1,458	0.86%	New
Independent	Sandhyatai Jogeshwar Warjukar	1,184	0.70%	New
Margin of victory		30,616	18.11%	▲5.10
Turnout		169,113	71.79%	▼5.28
Total valid votes		169,041		
Registered electors		235,565		▲19.64
INC hold		Swing	▲4.18	

=== Assembly By-election 2006 ===
2006 Maharashtra Legislative Assembly by-election : Chimur
Party	Candidate	Votes	%	±%
INC	Vijay Namdevrao Wadettiwar	73,832	48.67%	▲18.24
BJP	Rameshkumar Baburaoji Gajbe	54,088	35.66%	New
Republican Party of India (Democratic)	Ashok Pandharinath Ramteke	7,450	4.91%	New
Independent	Diwakar Pendam	4,155	2.74%	New
Independent	Netaji Tanbaji Rajgadkar	2,562	1.69%	New
Margin of victory		19,744	13.02%	▲12.47
Turnout		151,701	77.05%	▲2.57
Total valid votes		151,690		
Registered electors		196,888		▲0.20
INC gain from SS		Swing	▲17.69	

=== Assembly Election 2004 ===
2004 Maharashtra Legislative Assembly election : Chimur
Party	Candidate	Votes	%	±%
SS	Vijay Namdevrao Wadettiwar	45,332	30.98%	New
INC	Dr. Avinash Manoharrao Warjukar	44,529	30.43%	▼8.71
Independent	Rameshkumar Baburaoji Gajbe	15,193	10.38%	New
BSP	Prakash Motiram Wakade	14,945	10.21%	▲8.59
Independent	Avinash Manik Dhok	5,637	3.85%	New
Independent	Prof. Dada Dahikar	4,241	2.90%	New
Independent	Jitendra Adaku Raut	1,898	1.30%	New
Margin of victory		803	0.55%	▲0.01
Turnout		146,356	74.49%	▲1.94
Total valid votes		146,334		
Registered electors		196,486		▲11.01
SS gain from INC		Swing	▼8.17	

=== Assembly Election 1999 ===
1999 Maharashtra Legislative Assembly election : Chimur
Party	Candidate	Votes	%	±%
INC	Dr. Avinash Manoharrao Warjukar	50,254	39.14%	▲28.84
Independent	Rameshkumar Baburaoji Gajbe	49,568	38.61%	New
NCP	Shridhar Arjun Lodhe	13,385	10.43%	New
Independent	Shrihari Naktu Shende	9,528	7.42%	New
BSP	Sanjay Giridhar Ghutake	2,081	1.62%	▼1.86
JD(S)	Qureshi Muhammad Iklakh Muhammad Isuf	1,289	1.00%	New
Independent	Ramteke Bhashkar Dewaji	904	0.70%	New
Margin of victory		686	0.53%	▼4.37
Turnout		135,494	76.55%	▼13.76
Total valid votes		128,383		
Registered electors		176,998		▲1.99
INC gain from Independent		Swing	▲14.82	

=== Assembly Election 1995 ===
1995 Maharashtra Legislative Assembly election : Chimur
Party	Candidate	Votes	%	±%
Independent	Dr. Rameshkumar Baburaoji Gajbe	36,433	24.33%	New
BJP	Ramdasji Lahanuji Gabhane	29,090	19.43%	New
JD	Shekh Bhai Rahemtulla	17,547	11.72%	▼8.96
Independent	Dr. Tembhurkar Manohar Bhagwan	16,251	10.85%	New
Independent	Bajaj Yashodhara Bhagirath	15,685	10.47%	New
INC	Waghmare Baburao Jasuji	15,436	10.31%	▼12.56
BSP	Chauke Mandabai Tukaram	5,217	3.48%	New
Margin of victory		7,343	4.90%	▲3.17
Turnout		153,348	88.36%	▲14.52
Total valid votes		149,755		
Registered electors		173,548		▲7.72
Independent gain from INC		Swing	▲1.46	

=== Assembly Election 1990 ===
1990 Maharashtra Legislative Assembly election : Chimur
Party	Candidate	Votes	%	±%
INC	Baburao Jasuji Waghmare	26,442	22.87%	▼28.98
SS	Jaiswal Baba Alias Yogendra Laximinarayan	24,432	21.13%	New
Independent	Rameshkumar Baburaoji Gajbe	24,094	20.84%	New
JD	M. Rahemtulla Abdul Hakim	23,915	20.68%	New
Independent	Shende Raghunath Adku	4,935	4.27%	New
Independent	Mohurle Mahaganesh Mohan	3,234	2.80%	New
RPI(K)	Jambhulkar Haridas Nusaji	2,009	1.74%	New
Margin of victory		2,010	1.74%	▼35.20
Turnout		117,577	72.98%	▲7.32
Total valid votes		115,634		
Registered electors		161,106		▲19.03
INC hold		Swing	▼28.98	

=== Assembly Election 1985 ===
1985 Maharashtra Legislative Assembly election : Chimur
Party	Candidate	Votes	%	±%
INC	Bagde Bhujangrao Mukundrao	45,235	51.85%	New
Independent	M. Rahemtulla Abdul Hakim	13,008	14.91%	New
Independent	Kamdi Niwarutti Vithobaji	10,704	12.27%	New
BJP	Sirsa Bhaskar Shankar	9,244	10.60%	▼5.50
Independent	Moon Dayaram Urkuda	4,056	4.65%	New
Independent	Dange Ekanath Hirmanji	3,447	3.95%	New
Independent	Narade Vasant Mahadeo	823	0.94%	New
Margin of victory		32,227	36.94%	▼1.08
Turnout		88,869	65.66%	▼0.45
Total valid votes		87,243		
Registered electors		135,351		▲7.41
INC gain from INC(I)		Swing	▼2.27	

=== Assembly Election 1980 ===
1980 Maharashtra Legislative Assembly election : Chimur
Party	Candidate	Votes	%	±%
INC(I)	Bajaj Yeshodhara Bhagirathji	44,264	54.12%	▼6.65
BJP	Poshattiwar Vasantrao Yadaorao	13,168	16.10%	New
INC(U)	Sonwane Vithalrao Goma	12,666	15.49%	New
RPI	Gedam Haribhau Watu	8,765	10.72%	New
Independent	Pise Shankarrao Tukaram	1,465	1.79%	New
Independent	Bhaurao Laxmanrao Dandekar	787	0.96%	New
Independent	Kale Damodhar Laxmanrao	676	0.83%	New
Margin of victory		31,096	38.02%	▲4.18
Turnout		83,945	66.61%	▼11.22
Total valid votes		81,791		
Registered electors		126,019		▲5.78
INC(I) hold		Swing	▼6.65	

=== Assembly Election 1978 ===
1978 Maharashtra Legislative Assembly election : Chimur
Party	Candidate	Votes	%	±%
INC(I)	Sonwane Adkuji Shiwaji	55,117	60.77%	New
JP	Korekar Gopalrao Keshaorao	24,431	26.94%	New
INC	Narendra Marotrao Yawale	8,897	9.81%	▼23.79
Independent	Nagdeote Namdeo Vishnuji	2,249	2.48%	New
Margin of victory		30,686	33.83%	▲33.44
Turnout		93,732	78.68%	▲5.07
Total valid votes		90,694		
Registered electors		119,134		▲35.85
INC(I) gain from INC		Swing	▲27.18	

=== Assembly Election 1972 ===
1972 Maharashtra Legislative Assembly election : Chimur
Party	Candidate	Votes	%	±%
INC	Biraje G Motirambapu	20,934	33.59%	▼6.98
Independent	Sonawane Adaku Shiwaji	20,689	33.20%	New
SSP	Gopalrao Korekar	6,385	10.25%	New
ABJS	Alamasia Gurudasji Ramdas	5,521	8.86%	▼10.28
RPI(K)	Sakhare Janardhan Yadao	5,492	8.81%	New
RPI	Nagdeote Sadashio Timaji	3,292	5.28%	New
Margin of victory		245	0.39%	▼18.97
Turnout		64,881	73.99%	▲13.45
Total valid votes		62,313		
Registered electors		87,693		▲12.29
INC hold		Swing	▼6.98	

=== Assembly Election 1967 ===
1967 Maharashtra Legislative Assembly election : Chimur
Party	Candidate	Votes	%	±%
INC	Marotirao D. Tumpalliwar	18,256	40.58%	▼8.84
SSP	G. K. Korekar	9,545	21.22%	New
ABJS	K. S. Nakade	8,609	19.14%	▲0.14
Independent	T. P. Dhok	6,427	14.29%	New
Independent	D. L. Kale	1,395	3.10%	New
Independent	N. V. Nagdeote	758	1.68%	New
Margin of victory		8,711	19.36%	▼11.06
Turnout		50,131	64.19%	▼7.41
Total valid votes		44,990		
Registered electors		78,094		▲6.86
INC hold		Swing	▼8.84	

=== Assembly Election 1962 ===
1962 Maharashtra Legislative Assembly election : Chimur
Party	Candidate	Votes	%	±%
INC	Marotirao D. Tumpalliwar	23,479	49.41%	New
ABJS	Balaji Deorao Borkar	9,024	18.99%	New
RPI	Laxman Shioram Jiwane	8,753	18.42%	New
Independent	Trimbak Paikaji Dhok	6,258	13.17%	New
Margin of victory		14,455	30.42%	
Turnout		51,798	70.88%	
Total valid votes		47,514		
Registered electors		73,081		
INC win (new seat)				
