= Dharamrao Baba Atram =

Indian leader of Nationalist Congress Party

Dharamraobaba Atram

Cabinet Minister Government of Maharashtra
- In office 14 July 2023 – 26 November 2024
- Minister: Food & Drug Administration
- Governor: Ramesh Bais; C. P. Radhakrishnan
- Cabinet: Eknath Shinde ministry
- Chief Minister: Eknath Shinde
- Deputy CM: Devendra Fadnavis (First); Ajit Pawar (Second)
- Guardian Minister: Gondiya
- Preceded by: Sanjay Rathod
- Succeeded by: Narhari Zirwal

Member of the Maharashtra Legislative Assembly
- Incumbent
- Assumed office (1990-1995), (1999-2004), (2004-2009), (2019-2024), (2024-Present)
- Preceded by: Raje Ambrishrao Raje Satyawan Rao Atram
- Constituency: Aheri-Sironcha

Personal details
- Born: October 20, 1953 (age 73) Aheri Rajwada, Dist.Gadchiroli District
- Party: Nationalist Congress Party (1999-Present)
- Other political affiliations: Indian National Congress (Before 1999)
- Children: • Bhagyashree Atram-Halgekar (Daughter) • Tanushree Atram (Daughter) • Harshawardhanrao Atram (Son)
- Occupation: Politician

Dharamraobaba Bhagwantrao Raje Atram is an Indian leader of Nationalist Congress Party and minister of Maharashtra government a member of the Maharashtra Legislative Assembly elected from Aheri Assembly constituency in Gadchiroli city.

== Positions held ==
- 2019: Elected to Maharashtra Legislative Assembly.
- 2023: Appointed cabinet Minister in government of Maharashtra in ministry of Food & Drug (Administration) in Maharashtra in Eknath Shinde Ministry
