= Nag Vidarbha Andolan Samiti =

Nag Vidarbha Andolan Samiti also known as NVAS is a political outfit fighting for separate statehood for Vidarbha region in Maharashtra, India.
