= Kusumba Assembly constituency =

Former constituency of the Maharashtra legislative assembly in India

Coordinates: 19.020°N 72.843°E

Kusumba
- Former constituency for the Maharashtra Legislative Assembly

Constituency details
- Country: India
- Region: Western India
- State: Maharashtra
- Lok Sabha constituency: Dhule
- Established: 1962
- Abolished: 2008

Kusumba Vidhan Sabha seat was one of the constituencies of Maharashtra Vidhan Sabha, in India. It was a segment of Dhule Lok Sabha constituency. Kusumba seat existed until the 2004 elections after which it was succeeded by Dhule Rural Assembly constituency seat in 2008.

== Members of Legislative Assembly ==
Year	Member	Party
1978	Rohidas Patil	Indian National Congress (I)
1980	Rohidas Patil	Indian National Congress (I)
1985	Dattatray Patil	Indian National Congress
1990	Rohidas Patil	Indian National Congress
1995	Rohidas Patil	Indian National Congress
1999	Rohidas Patil	Indian National Congress
2004	Rohidas Patil	Indian National Congress
2009 onwards : See Dhule Rural
2009	Prof. Sharad Patil	Shiv Sena
2014	Kunal Rohidas Patil	Indian National Congress
2019	Kunal Rohidas Patil	Indian National Congress
2024	Ramdada Manohar Bhadane Patil	Bharatiya Janata Party

== Election results ==
=== Assembly Election 2004 ===
2004 Maharashtra Legislative Assembly election : Kusumba
Party	Candidate	Votes	%	±%
INC	Rohidas Chudaman Patil	80,419	55.26%	▲7.22
SS	Prof.Patil Sharad Madhavrao	41,122	28.26%	▲24.69
Independent	Vinayak Valchand Shinde	19,553	13.44%	New
LJP	Shinde Ramdas Chanda	1,381	0.95%	New
BSP	Ad. Ramesh Chaitram Shinde	1,287	0.88%	New
Margin of victory		39,297	27.01%	▲26.56
Turnout		1,45,534	70.49%	▲8.96
Total valid votes		1,45,516		
Registered electors		2,06,474		▲19.67
INC hold		Swing	▲7.22	

=== Assembly Election 1999 ===
1999 Maharashtra Legislative Assembly election : Kusumba
Party	Candidate	Votes	%	±%
INC	Rohidas Chudaman Patil	48,147	48.05%	▲0.00
NCP	Gajanan Narayan Patil	47,702	47.61%	New
SS	Jadhav Dayaram Vishram	3,576	3.57%	▲0.75
Margin of victory		445	0.44%	▼2.53
Turnout		1,06,156	61.53%	▼2.73
Total valid votes		1,00,203		
Registered electors		1,72,532		▲3.01
INC hold		Swing	▲0.00	

=== Assembly Election 1995 ===
1995 Maharashtra Legislative Assembly election : Kusumba
Party	Candidate	Votes	%	±%
INC	Rohidas Chudaman Patil	51,710	48.05%	▼19.42
Independent	Gajanan Narayan Patil	48,510	45.07%	New
SS	Thakare Madhukar Krishnaji	3,038	2.82%	▼13.70
Independent	Bhamare Pramilabai Bhaskar	1,350	1.25%	New
Independent	Bhil Vishnu Bhagwan	1,214	1.13%	New
Independent	Prof. Ravandale Dhanraj Vedu	1,078	1.00%	New
Margin of victory		3,200	2.97%	▼47.97
Turnout		1,12,293	67.05%	▼1.47
Total valid votes		1,07,624		
Registered electors		1,67,484		▲14.72
INC hold		Swing	▼19.42	

=== Assembly Election 1990 ===
1990 Maharashtra Legislative Assembly election : Kusumba
Party	Candidate	Votes	%	±%
INC	Rohidas Chudaman Patil	64,742	67.47%	▲4.24
SS	Khairnar Gulabrao Jayvantrao	15,857	16.53%	New
Independent	Jaiswal Sanjay Durgadin (Dhabuseth)	5,402	5.63%	New
Independent	Sadashiv Shankar Mali	4,377	4.56%	New
Independent	Hiraman Appa Gavali	2,772	2.89%	New
JD	Jagatrao Sanwpne	1,221	1.27%	New
Margin of victory		48,885	50.95%	▲21.69
Turnout		98,298	67.33%	▲11.35
Total valid votes		95,955		
Registered electors		1,45,991		▲20.00
INC hold		Swing	▲4.24	

=== Assembly Election 1985 ===
1985 Maharashtra Legislative Assembly election : Kusumba
Party	Candidate	Votes	%	±%
INC	Dattatray Waman Patil	41,835	63.23%	New
PWPI	Chaudhari Hiraman Ratan	22,477	33.97%	New
Margin of victory		19,358	29.26%	▲26.71
Turnout		68,156	56.02%	▼11.79
Total valid votes		66,162		
Registered electors		1,21,664		▲9.93
INC gain from INC(I)		Swing	▲11.96	

=== Assembly Election 1980 ===
1980 Maharashtra Legislative Assembly election : Kusumba
Party	Candidate	Votes	%	±%
INC(I)	Rohidas Chudaman Patil	37,550	51.27%	▲4.77
INC(U)	Bhamare Ramrao Sitaram	35,684	48.73%	New
Margin of victory		1,866	2.55%	▼24.26
Turnout		75,612	68.32%	▼0.71
Total valid votes		73,234		
Registered electors		1,10,676		▲8.00
INC(I) hold		Swing	▲4.77	

=== Assembly Election 1978 ===
1978 Maharashtra Legislative Assembly election : Kusumba
Party	Candidate	Votes	%	±%
INC(I)	Rohidas Chudaman Patil	31,873	46.50%	New
INC	Mali Sadashiv Shankar	13,498	19.69%	New
JP	Patil Dasharath Parbat	10,748	15.68%	New
Independent	Patil Ekanath Punjaram	6,231	9.09%	New
PWPI	Patil Zulal Bhilajirao	2,628	3.83%	New
Independent	Masule Mansaram Haibat	2,543	3.71%	New
Independent	Patil Malojirao Desharath	717	1.05%	New
Margin of victory		18,375	26.81%	
Turnout		71,754	70.02%	
Total valid votes		68,541		
Registered electors		1,02,480		
INC(I) win (new seat)				

== See also ==
- List of constituencies of Maharashtra Legislative Assembly
