= Dhule Assembly constituency =

Former constituency of the Maharashtra legislative assembly in India

Dhule
- Former constituency for the Maharashtra Legislative Assembly

Constituency details
- Country: India
- Region: Western India
- State: Maharashtra
- District: Dhule
- Lok Sabha constituency: Dhule
- Established: 1978
- Abolished: 2008

Dhule Vidhan Sabha seat was one of the constituencies of Maharashtra Vidhan Sabha, in India. It was a segment of Dhule Lok Sabha constituency. Dhule seat existed until the 2004 elections after which it was renamed Dhule City seat in 2008.

== Members of Vidhan Sabha ==
Year	Member	Party
Before 1978 : Constituency did not exist
1978	Kisanrao Khopade	Indian National Congress (I)
1980	Kamalabai Ajmera	Indian National Congress (I)
1985	Shalini Borse	Indian National Congress
1990	Shalini Borse	Indian National Congress
1995	Rajvardhan Kadambande	Independent
1999	Anil Anna Gote	Samajwadi Janata Party
2004	Rajvardhan Kadambande	Nationalist Congress Party
2008 onwards: See Dhule City

== Election results ==
=== Assembly Election 2004 ===
2004 Maharashtra Legislative Assembly election : Dhule
Party	Candidate	Votes	%	±%
NCP	Kadambande Rajwardhan Raghojirao Alias Raju Baba	54,457	39.26%	New
SS	Dr. Subhash Ramrao Bhamre	49,114	35.41%	▲3.88
BSP	Ansari Fazalur Raheman Saeed Ahemad	6,494	4.68%	▲4.22
SP	Shah Farooq Anwar	1,458	1.05%	New
LJP	Mohite Youraj Ambar	1,447	1.04%	New
Independent	Shah Saleem Inoddin	1,151	0.83%	New
Margin of victory		5,343	3.85%	▲0.75
Turnout		138,706	53.40%	▲1.62
Total valid votes		138,693		
Registered electors		259,770		▲9.41
NCP gain from Samajwadi Janata Party (Maharashtra)		Swing	▲4.63	

=== Assembly Election 1999 ===
1999 Maharashtra Legislative Assembly election : Dhule
Party	Candidate	Votes	%	±%
Samajwadi Janata Party (Maharashtra)	Anil Anna Gote	40,986	34.64%	New
SS	Bapu Shardul	37,310	31.53%	▲19.30
INC	Kadambande Rajwardhan Raghojirao Alias Raju Baba	33,352	28.19%	▲12.83
JD(S)	Mohamad Idris Abdul Gani	4,679	3.95%	New
Independent	Ashokbhai Vasudeo Dhulkar	904	0.76%	New
Margin of victory		3,676	3.11%	▼4.72
Turnout		122,935	51.78%	▼11.21
Total valid votes		118,323		
Registered electors		237,423		▲9.42
Samajwadi Janata Party (Maharashtra) gain from Independent		Swing	▲9.43	

=== Assembly Election 1995 ===
1995 Maharashtra Legislative Assembly election : Dhule
Party	Candidate	Votes	%	±%
Independent	Kadambande Rajwardhan Raghojirao Alias Raju Baba	34,456	25.21%	New
Independent	Bapu Shardul	23,755	17.38%	New
INC	Patil Ramrao Sitaram	20,990	15.36%	▼18.42
JD	Ansari Bashir Ah.Rajjak	20,269	14.83%	New
SS	Navale Mohan Tulshiram	16,721	12.23%	▼20.47
Independent	Borse Shalini Sudhakar	10,018	7.33%	New
PWPI	Zulal Bhilajirao Patil	2,523	1.85%	New
Margin of victory		10,701	7.83%	▲6.76
Turnout		139,397	64.24%	▲8.22
Total valid votes		136,680		
Registered electors		216,991		▲20.67
Independent gain from INC		Swing	▼8.57	

=== Assembly Election 1990 ===
1990 Maharashtra Legislative Assembly election : Dhule
Party	Candidate	Votes	%	±%
INC	Borse Shalini Sudhakar	33,266	33.78%	▼6.84
SS	Bapu Shardul	32,210	32.70%	New
CPI	Chaudhari	15,050	15.28%	New
Independent	Shinde Vinayak (Bapuji)	14,211	14.43%	New
Margin of victory		1,056	1.07%	▼10.35
Turnout		99,738	55.46%	▲0.66
Total valid votes		98,490		
Registered electors		179,824		▲38.36
INC hold		Swing	▼6.84	

=== Assembly Election 1985 ===
1985 Maharashtra Legislative Assembly election : Dhule
Party	Candidate	Votes	%	±%
INC	Shalini Sudhakar Borase	28,562	40.61%	New
IC(S)	Abasaheb N. C. Patil	20,528	29.19%	New
Independent	Bhai Madane	8,734	12.42%	New
RPI(K)	M. G. Dhivare	7,435	10.57%	New
Independent	Andhari Shafik Fajlu Raheman	3,296	4.69%	New
Independent	Bhagwatiprasad Rambharos Pande	494	0.70%	New
Margin of victory		8,034	11.42%	▲8.27
Turnout		71,617	55.10%	▲2.06
Total valid votes		70,328		
Registered electors		129,970		▲13.35
INC gain from INC(I)		Swing	▼2.19	

=== Assembly Election 1980 ===
1980 Maharashtra Legislative Assembly election : Dhule
Party	Candidate	Votes	%	±%
INC(I)	Ajmera Kamalabai Chhaganlal	25,541	42.80%	▲6.09
Independent	Khopade Kisanrao Manikrao	23,661	39.65%	New
JP	Chauk Vijaya Vishnu	8,078	13.54%	New
Independent	Nerkar Hiraman Dhudaku	1,485	2.49%	New
Independent	Dadabhai Jemi Echarsha	371	0.62%	New
Margin of victory		1,880	3.15%	▼8.64
Turnout		60,680	52.92%	▼12.59
Total valid votes		59,676		
Registered electors		114,660		▲9.12
INC(I) hold		Swing	▲6.09	

=== Assembly Election 1978 ===
1978 Maharashtra Legislative Assembly election : Dhule
Party	Candidate	Votes	%	±%
INC(I)	Khopade Kisanrao Manikrao	24,933	36.71%	New
Independent	Nerkar Hiraman Dhudaku	16,928	24.92%	New
Independent	Ansari Abdul Waheb Abdul Kadir	11,284	16.61%	New
INC	Karankal Kisanrao Sonu	7,487	11.02%	New
Independent	Choudhari Ramdas Bhagwan	6,010	8.85%	New
Independent	Patole Subhash Vithal	540	0.80%	New
Margin of victory		8,005	11.79%	
Turnout		69,543	66.18%	
Total valid votes		67,916		
Registered electors		105,075		
INC(I) win (new seat)				

== See also ==
- List of constituencies of Maharashtra Legislative Assembly
