= Reshma Motiram Bhoye =

Indian politician

Member of Parliament, Lok Sabha
- In office 1980–1991
- Preceded by: Vijay Naval Patil
- Succeeded by: Bapu Hari Chaure
- Constituency: Dhule, Maharashtra

Personal details
- Born: 22 June 1937 Kudashi, Dhule District, Bombay Presidency, British India
- Party: Indian National Congress
- Spouse: Bano Bai Reshma Bhoye

Reshma Motiram Bhoye is an Indian politician. He was elected to the Lok Sabha, the lower house of the Parliament of India as a member of the Indian National Congress.
