= Uttamrao Patil =

Indian politician

Uttamrao Laxmanrao Patil
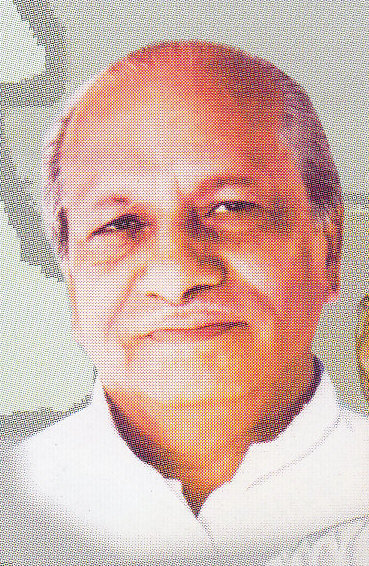

President of Bharatiya Janata Party, Maharashtra
- In office 1980–1986
- Preceded by: office created
- Succeeded by: Gopinath Munde

Minister of Revenue Government of Maharashtra
- In office July 1978 – February 1980
- Chief Minister: Sharad Pawar

Leader of the Opposition Maharashtra Legislative Council
- In office 22 July 1967 – 26 March 1978
- Chief Minister: Vasantrao Naik; Shankarrao Chavan; Vasantdada Patil
- Preceded by: Ramjeevan Choudhary
- Succeeded by: Arjunrao Kasture

Member of Parliament, Lok Sabha
- In office 1989–1991
- Preceded by: Vijaykumar Naval Patil
- Succeeded by: Vijaykumar Naval Patil
- Constituency: Erandol
- In office 1957–1962
- Preceded by: office created
- Succeeded by: Chudaman Ananda Patil
- Constituency: Dhule

Member of Maharashtra Legislative Assembly
- In office 1978–1980
- Preceded by: Bhaskarrao Rajaram Patil
- Succeeded by: Bhaskarrao Rajaram Patil
- Constituency: Parola

Member of Maharashtra Legislative Council
- In office 1966–1978
- Constituency: Graduates

Personal details
- Born: 12 February 1921 Malgaon, Chalisgaon Tehsil District Jalgaon
- Died: 18 November 2001 (aged 80)
- Spouse: Vimalatai Patil (m. 1947)
- Children: 2 sons & 3 daughters
- Education: Master of Arts; Bachelor in Law

Uttamrao Laxmanrao Patil alias Nanasaheb (1921 February 12 –2001 November 18) was an Indian politician and leader of the Bharatiya Janata Party. He was elected to Second Lok Sabha from 1957 to 1962 from Dhulia Lok Sabha Constituency of erstwhile Bombay State as a candidate of Bharatiya Jana Sangh. He was elected to Ninth Lok Sabha from 1989 to 1991 from Erandol Lok Sabha Constituency of Maharashtra as a candidate of Bharatiya Janata Party. He was also a Member of Maharashtra Legislative Council during 1954-55 and from 1966 to 1978. He was the Leader of Opposition of the council from 1966 to 1978. He was also a member of Maharashtra Legislative Assembly from 1978 to 1980. He was state cabinet minister from 1978 to 1980 in the Progressive Democratic alliance Government of Maharashtra state led by Sharad Pawar. He held revenue portfolio. He was an advocate by profession. Shri Patil authored two books. He was also the founder editor of Sudarshan weekly. He died on 18 November 2001 at Mumbai.

== Early life and education ==
Uttamrao Patil was born at Waghali in Chalisgaon tehsil of Jalgaon district in a farmer family. His school education was done at Raver. His college education was done at Baroda in an institute run by Raje Sayajirao Gaekwad. He did his law graduation in Pune. It was in law college where he became acquainted with the thoughts of Vinayak Damodar Savarkar, N B Kher and Shyama Prasad Mukherjee, whom he brought to the law college as a guest speaker. He was a college debate secretary. He did his postgraduate studies at Kolhapur.

== Early political days ==
When Bharatiya Jana Sangh was formed at the national level in 1951, the party started planning in Maharashtra also. They wanted their leader to be learned, an orator, an organiser and from a rural background.

Uttamrao Patil was the right choice. On pursuation of Dattopant Thengdi, Nana Dhobale and Rambhau Godbole, Mr. Patil joined Bharatiya Jansangh. He, along with colleagues, toured the state and brought many dedicated workers in the party who became founder pillars of the organisation. Some of these included Baburao Vaidya, Zamatmalji, Raghoba and Rajabhau Zarkar, Sadubhau Deshpande, Kshema Thatte, Malati Paranjape, Meera Pavgi, Kisan Gharpure, Gangadharpant, Vasantrao and Bhagwanrao Patwardhan, Bhagwanrao Joshi, Baburao Dev, Pandurang Ghalsasi, Hampi Vakil, Bhausaheb Badhiye, and Bhaskar Ninave.

He was the first State President of Bharatiya Jansangh and Rambhau godbole was the first organising secretary.

== Electoral and Parliamentary politics (1954–1991) ==
=== Member of Maharashtra Legislative Council (1954-1955) ===
In 1954, Nanasaheb contested election to Maharashtra Legislative Council and won by sheer hard work of party workers. Thus party got its first legislator in Maharashtra. The first congratulatory telegram message was from Swatantryaveer Savarkar.

In 1955, he resigned from the legislature on party orders on formation of the Samyukta Maharashtra Movement.

In 1956, Nanasaheb was amongst leaders of Goa liberation movement. He organized volunteer batches to be sent in Goa. Later, the Maharashtra government granted Freedom Fighter status to all participants. A signed letter by Nanasaheb was sufficient to grant this status to an applicant. Nanasaheb himself never accepted any awards, perks or pension for his contributions.

=== Member of Second Lok Sabha (1957-1962) ===
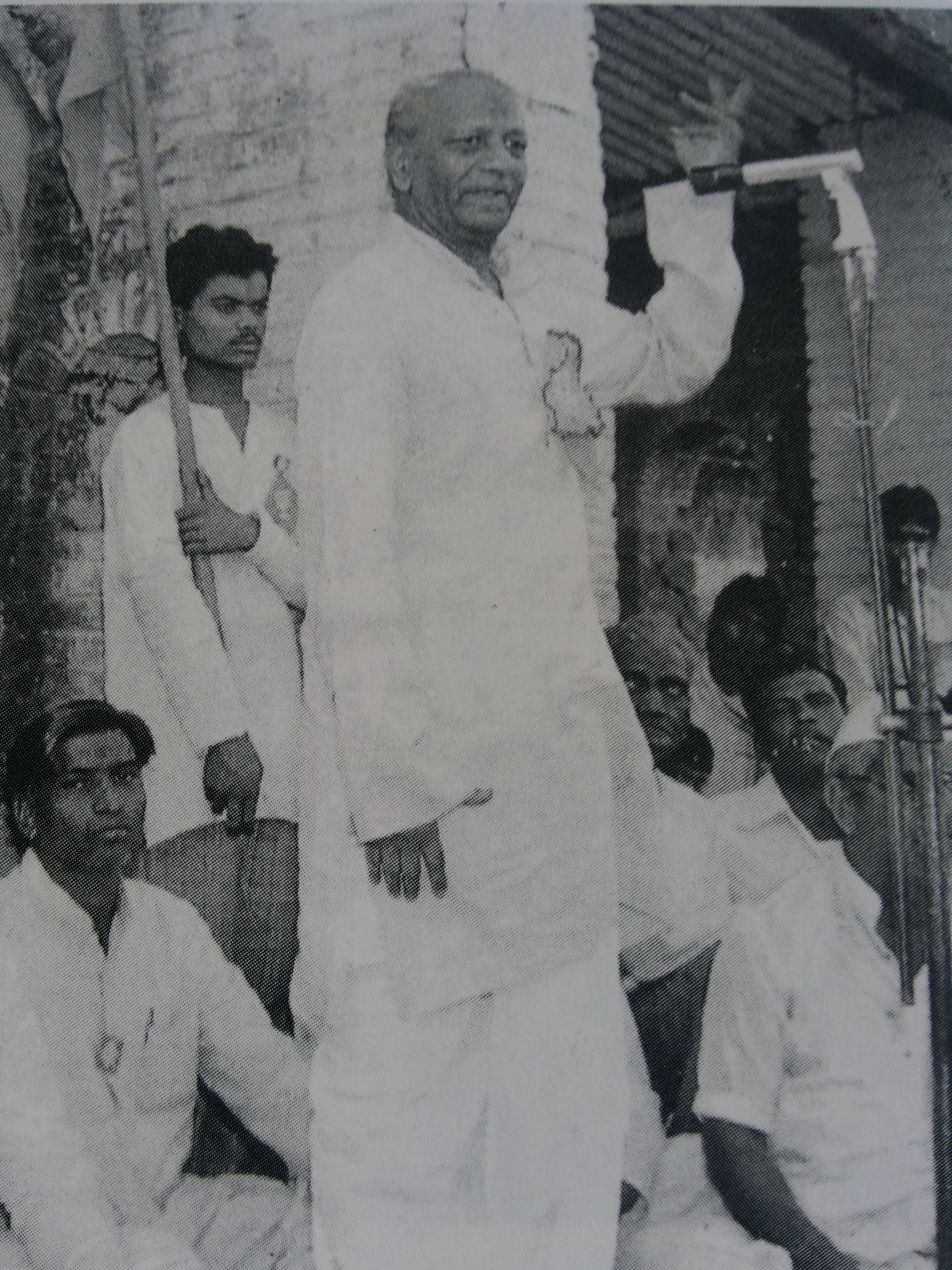

In 1957, first time after Jan Sangh's formation, Parliament elections were held. Nanasaheb contested from Dhule Loksabha and won handsomely. Nanasaheb became the first member of Parliament from Jan Sangh from Maharashtra. Only four MPs from Jan Sangh were elected from the whole of India - Atal Bihari Vajpayee, Premji Asar and Shivdin Droher were the other three. Atalji shared a room in MP hostel with Nanasaheb during his five-year term.

Some of the key issues Nanasaheb focused on during his tenure were long term national economic agenda, food shortages in country, and sincere and prompt action against China on the border issue. When PM Jawaharlal Nehru proposed co-op farming in India based on a Russian model, Nanasaheb opposed this in Parliament. He formed a strong farmer lobby of MPs including Chaudhari Charansing, A G Ranga, and Purushottam Patel, and opposition became nationwide. He propagated that "Land is farmer's mother and such soviet ideas are alien to this motherland". PM Nehru had to withdraw the proposal and Nanasaheb became the farmers' leader.

In 1957, he started a Marathi weekly publication, Sudarshan. It was a platform for the oppressed and an efficient tool against government apathy. He had to undergo many court cases for his articles but nothing could stop him from his mission. This weekly continued almost for 40 years.

For a brief period of 1960 to 1962, He was National Vice President of Jan Sangh.

In 1962, Nanasaheb contested 1962 Indian general election, but he lost the election from the Dhule Lok Sabha constituency against Congress candidate Chudaman Ananda Rawandale Patil by the margin of 94,855 votes.

=== Leader of Opposition in Maharashtra Legislative Council (1966-1978) ===
In 1966, Nanasaheb contested legislative council election from Graduate constituency. After some days, all opposition members of the council formed a National Democratic Alliance and Nanasaheb was chosen as its leader. He became Leader of Opposition in the legislative council and had ministerial status and perks. His office became a meeting point for opposition resulting in a very effective opposition assault on government on important issues. For a common man from rural area, his office and residence was open to visit and seek help. The formation of regional agriculture universities and realisation of the Employment Assurance Scheme (precursor of MNREGA) were his contributions in this period. He continued to be Leader of Opposition until 1978.

==== Emergency years (1975-1977) ====
During Indira Gandhi's national internal emergency, most of the opposition leaders (including those of Jan Sangh) were put behind the bars. Some went underground. Nanasaheb was not behind bars because he was hospitalized after a major road accident. He had suffered a severe injury with 36 fractures and neuromuscular ailments. He used this time to the party's advantage, and notwithstanding all his physical limitations, he worked as the party's national executive secretary as well as president for some time. He extensively connected with jailed party workers' families and arranged for their paroles in sickness, family death or family marriages. He also participated in the formation of the Janata Party and its initial setup (Janata Party was an amalgam of Indian political parties opposed to the State of Emergency). As a result, the party formation was complete and the party was ready when elections were declared in 1977.

==== Personal defeat forgotten in party victory ====
After formation of Janata Party, he was unanimously elected as President of Maharashtra Pradesh. In 1977, he contested a Lok Sabha election from Dhule constituency. There was a Janata wave and Congress was uprooted all over India (Indira and Sanjay Gandhi suffered a personal defeat as MP candidates). Candidates like George Fernandes won even from jail. But surprisingly Nanasaheb lost the election to a novice congress candidate in Dhule. This was the only defeat of the Janata Party on Mumbai Agra highway constituencies. Keeping his personal defeat aside, Nanasaheb consented to a victory procession in Dhule to celebrate the nationwide Janata Party victory.

=== Revenue Minister of Maharastra State and Member of Legislative Assembly (1978-1980) ===
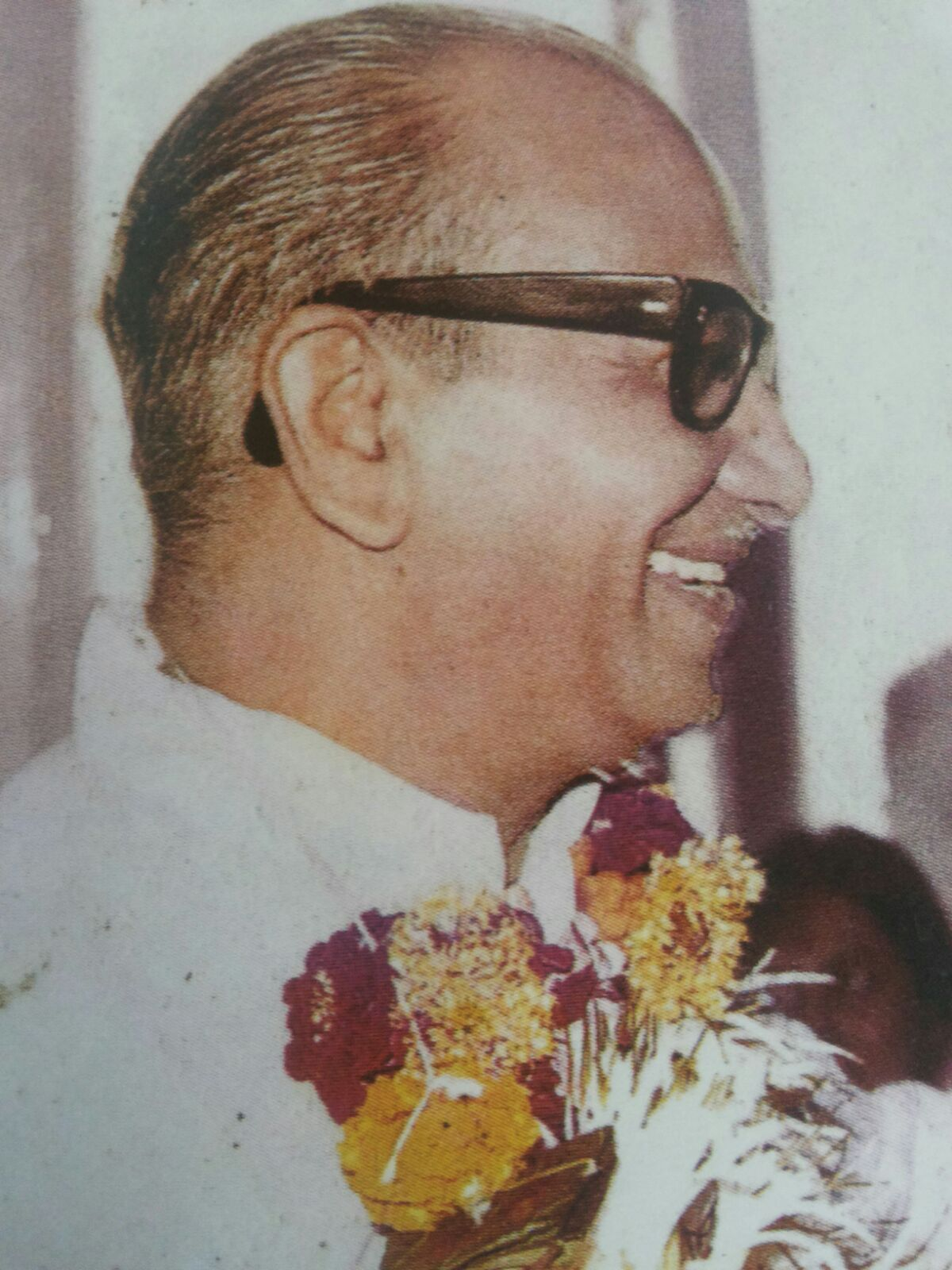
Swearing in as Maharashtra Revenue Minister

In 1978, the elections to Maharashtra assembly were declared. Nanasaheb was still a council legislator but he decided to contest and was given a party ticket from Parola–Bhadgaon constituency. He was seen as a chief ministerial candidate in case of the party win. As a party president, he had to tour the whole Maharashtra state and had very little time to campaign in his own constituency. The young party workers took this campaign responsibility and he won the election by a handsome majority. Janata party was the largest single party but congress and S-congress came together and managed to form a government. Nanasaheb became the Leader of Opposition in the assembly.

There was soon a deflection in the congress coalition government and Sharad Pawar broke away from the Congress party to form a coalition government with the Janata Party in 1978.

Though Janata Party had more than thrice the legislature members than Sharad Pawar's fragment, still Pawar became the Chief Minister of the new Progressive Democratic Alliance. Nanasaheb was given a revenue and rehabilitation portfolio. He occupied 'Varsha' bungalow as his official residence. This government was short-lived and summarily dismissed in February 1980, following Indira Gandhi's return to power in Delhi.

During this short tenure, Nanasaheb took many important decisions giving to the tribal people (Adivasis) ownership of the land which they had cultivated for generations.

=== Retirement from electoral politics (1980-1989) ===
In 1980, Janata Party disintegrated fully. The old Jan Sangh again reunited as the Bharatiya Janata Party in Mumbai with the lotus as its symbol. Atal Bihari Vajpayee was chosen as the National President and Nanasaheb was chosen as the President of Maharashtra BJP. In the same year, Nanasaheb declared his retirement from active electoral politics and vowed to work for the party only.

In 1984, he handed over the presidency to the young Gopinath Munde and declared that in future neither would he contest elections nor would he hold party positions. He will be just 'a party worker' henceforth. He was 63 years old at the time.

=== Last stint as Member of Ninth Lok Sabha (1989-1991) ===
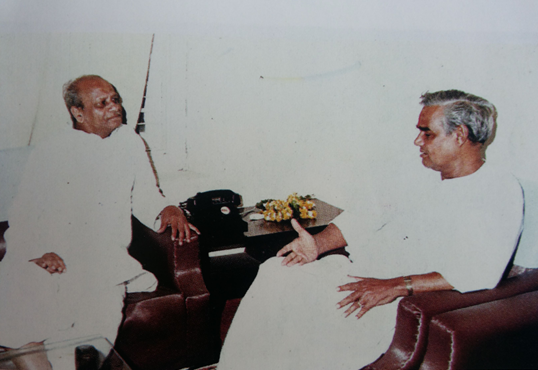
Nanasaheb with Atalji

Despite his resolution of not participating in active politics, Nanasaheb contested the Lok Sabha elections once more, for the final time. The reason for contesting was an emotional one. Party was expecting a good parliamentary result and a probable government formation in Delhi. The party counted on winning every favourable seat to achieve its goal. Atal Bihari Vajpayee personally insisted that Nanasaheb should contest the upcoming elections. Nanasaheb was not physically ready for the task, but following party dictum he contested from Erandol constituency. Despite 10 years of absence from electoral politics, he was still the people's leader and won easily. Ninth Lok Sabha did not complete its five-year tenure and was dissolved in 1991. Nanasaheb felt very much relieved. He never again contested.
