= Dhule Rural Assembly constituency =

Constituency of the Maharashtra legislative assembly in India

Coordinates: 21.08°N 74.51°E

Dhule Rural
- Constituency No. 6 for the Maharashtra Legislative Assembly

Constituency details
- Country: India
- Region: Western India
- State: Maharashtra
- District: Dhule
- Lok Sabha constituency: Dhule
- Established: 2008
- Total electors: 410,522
- Reservation: None

Member of Legislative Assembly
- 15th Maharashtra Legislative Assembly
- Incumbent Raghavendra Patil
- Party: BJP
- Alliance: NDA
- Elected year: 2024

Dhule Rural Assembly constituency is one of the 288 Vidhan Sabha constituencies of Maharashtra state in western India. This constituency is located in Dhule district

== Overview ==
It is part of the Dhule Lok Sabha constituency along with another five Vidhan Sabha segments, namely Dhule City and Sindkheda in Dhule district and Malegaon Central, Malegaon Outer and Baglan in the Nashik district.

As per orders of Delimitation of Parliamentary and Assembly constituencies Order, 2008, No. 6 Dhule Rural Assembly constituency is composed of the following: Dhule Tehsil (Part), Revenue Circle - Lamkani, Songir, Fagane, Chinchkhede, Mukati, Dhule, Kusumbe, Arvi and Shirur of Dhule district.

== Members of Legislative Assembly ==
Year	Member	Party
1978	Rohidas Patil	Indian National Congress (I)
1980	Rohidas Patil	Indian National Congress (I)
1985	Dattatray Patil	Indian National Congress
1990	Rohidas Patil	Indian National Congress
1995	Rohidas Patil	Indian National Congress
1999	Rohidas Patil	Indian National Congress
2004	Rohidas Patil	Indian National Congress
Before 2009 : See Kusumba
2009	Prof. Sharad Patil	Shiv Sena
2014	Kunal Rohidas Patil	Indian National Congress
2019	Kunal Rohidas Patil	Indian National Congress
2024	Ramdada Manohar Bhadane Patil	Bharatiya Janata Party

== Election results ==
=== Assembly Election 2024 ===
2024 Maharashtra Legislative Assembly election : Dhule Rural
Party	Candidate	Votes	%	±%
BJP	Raghavendra Patil	170,398	59.15%	▲13.48
INC	Kunal Rohidas Patil	104,078	36.13%	▼15.53
Independent	Hilal (Aanna) Mali	7,982	2.77%	New
BAP	Manisha Anil Bhil	2,032	0.71%	New
NOTA	None of the Above	1,332	0.46%	▼0.46
Margin of victory		66,320	23.02%	▲17.03
Turnout		289,425	70.50%	▲5.00
Total valid votes		288,093		
Registered electors		410,522		▲10.06
BJP gain from INC		Swing	▲7.49	

=== Assembly Election 2019 ===
2019 Maharashtra Legislative Assembly election : Dhule Rural
Party	Candidate	Votes	%	±%
INC	Kunal Rohidas Patil	125,575	51.66%	▲0.48
BJP	Maisaheb Dnyanjyoti Manohar Patil	111,011	45.66%	▲14.29
VBA	Rajdip Bhatu Agale	4,216	1.73%	New
NOTA	None of the Above	2,248	0.92%	▲0.20
BSP	Baisane Nandu Sukdeo	1,471	0.61%	▼0.34
Margin of victory		14,564	5.99%	▼13.81
Turnout		245,489	65.82%	▼1.15
Total valid votes		243,099		
Registered electors		372,989		▲6.31
INC hold		Swing	▲0.48	

=== Assembly Election 2014 ===
2014 Maharashtra Legislative Assembly election : Dhule Rural
Party	Candidate	Votes	%	±%
INC	Kunal Rohidas Patil	119,094	51.18%	▲8.88
BJP	Manohar Dattatray Bhadane	73,012	31.38%	New
NCP	Kiran Gulabrao Patil	17,682	7.60%	New
SS	Prof. Sharad Madhavrao Patil	15,093	6.49%	▼45.66
MNS	Ajay Govindrao Mali	2,452	1.05%	New
BSP	Chavhan Raj Jagannath	2,199	0.95%	▼0.21
NOTA	None of the Above	1,676	0.72%	New
Margin of victory		46,082	19.80%	▲9.96
Turnout		234,571	66.86%	▲6.47
Total valid votes		232,693		
Registered electors		350,839		▲8.88
INC gain from SS		Swing	▼0.96	

=== Assembly Election 2009 ===
2009 Maharashtra Legislative Assembly election : Dhule Rural
Party	Candidate	Votes	%	±%
SS	Prof. Sharad Madhavrao Patil	100,562	52.15%	New
INC	Rohidas Chudaman Patil	81,580	42.30%	New
Independent	Motilal Kautik Mali	3,513	1.82%	New
BSP	Bhimrao Shyamrao Deore	2,219	1.15%	New
Independent	Ambar Mahadu Malich	1,681	0.87%	New
Hindustan Janta Party	Dadaso.Panditrao Patil	1,679	0.87%	New
Margin of victory		18,982	9.84%	
Turnout		193,169	59.95%	
Total valid votes		192,849		
Registered electors		322,222		
SS win (new seat)				

== See also ==
- Dhule
- List of constituencies of Maharashtra Vidhan Sabha
