= Pratap Narayanrao Sonawane =

Indian politician (1948)

Pratap Sonawane

Member of Parliament, Lok Sabha
- In office 2009–2014
- Preceded by: Bapu Hari Chaure
- Succeeded by: Subhash Bhamre
- Constituency: Dhule

Member of Maharashtra Legislative Council
- In office January 1998 – 26 May 2009
- Constituency: Nashik Graduates

Personal details
- Born: 22 December 1948 Manur, Nashik district, Bombay Province, India
- Died: 22 December 2023
- Party: Bharatiya Janata Party
- Spouse: Shobha (m. 1974)
- Children: 1 son, 2 daughters
- Parents: Narayan Sonawane (father); Sudha Sonawane (mother)
- Education: Bachelor of Engineering (Civil)

Pratap Narayanrao Sonawane (22 December 1948 - 22 December 2023) was an Indian politician who was a member of the 15th Lok Sabha. He represented the Dhule constituency of Maharashtra and was a member of the Bharatiya Janata Party (BJP) political party.

Sonawane was civil engineer by education and beginning on 31 August 2009 a member of the Committee on Urban Development from Lok Sabha.

Sonawane was elected as member of Maharashtra Legislative Council from Nashik Division Graduates' constituency for the term 6 December 2004 to 5 December 2010, but had resigned on 26 May 2009 due to election as MP for the 15th Lok Sabha.

Pratap Narayanrao Sonawane died on 22 December 2023, his 75th birthday.
