= Sahebrao Sukram Bagul =

Indian politician

Member of Parliament, Lok Sabha
- In office 1996–1998
- Preceded by: Bapu Hari Chaure
- Succeeded by: Dhanaji Ahire
- Constituency: Dhule

Personal details
- Born: 1 June 1953 (age 72) Khairkhunda, Dhule district
- Party: Bharatiya Janata Party
- Spouse: Kalpana Bai (m. 1975)
- Children: 2 sons, 1 daughter
- Education: Diploma in Ayurveda

Sahebrao Sukram Bagul (born June 1, 1953 in Khairkhunda, Dhule) was a member of the 11th Lok Sabha of India. He represented the Dhule constituency of Maharashtra and is a member of the Bharatiya Janata Party political party.
