= Dhule City Assembly constituency =

Constituency of the Maharashtra legislative assembly in India

Coordinates: 20°53′09.12″N 74°40′53.25″E

Dhule City
- Constituency No. 7 for the Maharashtra Legislative Assembly

Constituency details
- Country: India
- Region: Western India
- State: Maharashtra
- Division: Nashik
- District: Dhule
- Lok Sabha constituency: Dhule
- Established: 1973 (as Dhule); 2008 (as Dhule City)
- Total electors: 364,771
- Reservation: None

Member of Legislative Assembly
- 15th Maharashtra Legislative Assembly
- Incumbent Anup Agrawal
- Party: BJP
- Alliance: NDA
- Elected year: 2024

Dhule City Assembly constituency is one of the five constituencies of the Maharashtra Legislative Assembly located in Dhule district of the state in western India.

== Overview ==
This Legislative Assembly segment is a part of the Dhule Lok Sabha constituency along with five other Legislative Assembly segments, namely Dhule Rural and Sindkheda in the Dhule district and Malegaon Central, Malegaon Outer and Baglan in the Nashik district.

== Members of the Legislative Assembly ==
Year	Member	Party
Till 2009 : See Dhule
2009	Anil Anna Gote	Loksangram
2014	Anil Anna Gote	Bharatiya Janata Party
2019	Shah Faruk Anwar	All India Majlis-e-Ittehadul Muslimeen
2024	Anupbhaiyya Omprakash Agrawal	Bharatiya Janata Party

== Election results ==
=== Assembly Election 2024 ===
2024 Maharashtra Legislative Assembly election : Dhule City
Party	Candidate	Votes	%	±%
BJP	Anup Agrawal	116,538	53.09	New
AIMIM	Shah Faruk Anwar	70,788	32.25	▲3.07
SS(UBT)	Anil Anna Gote	24,304	11.07	New
VBA	Jitubhau Alias Jitendra Unda Shirsath	5,241	2.39	New
SP	Jahagirdar Irshad	1,748	0.80	New
NOTA	None of the Above	883	0.40	▼0.45
Margin of victory		45,750	20.84	▲18.78
Turnout		220,385	60.42	▲10.50
Total valid votes		219,502		
Registered electors		364,771		▲13.27
BJP gain from AIMIM		Swing	▲23.91	

=== Assembly Election 2019 ===
2019 Maharashtra Legislative Assembly election : Dhule City
Party	Candidate	Votes	%	±%
AIMIM	Shah Faruk Anwar	46,679	29.18	▲26.74
Independent	Rajubaban Kadambande	43,372	27.11	New
LS	Anil Anna Gote	42,432	26.52	New
SS	Hilal Lala Mali	22,427	14.02	▼3.68
NOTA	None of the Above	1,371	0.86	▲0.29
BSP	Ravindra Suresh Damodar	1,264	0.79	▼0.39
Independent	Mayur Devidas Ahirrao	1,034	0.65	New
Margin of victory		3,307	2.07	▼6.29
Turnout		161,541	50.16	▼4.38
Total valid votes		159,971		
Registered electors		322,026		▲12.52
AIMIM gain from BJP		Swing	▼8.17	

=== Assembly Election 2014 ===
2014 Maharashtra Legislative Assembly election : Dhule City
Party	Candidate	Votes	%	±%
BJP	Anil Anna Gote	57,780	37.35	New
NCP	Kadambande Rajwardhan Raghujirao	44,852	28.99	▲6.39
SS	Deore Subhash Shivajirao	27,379	17.70	▲4.67
INC	Khan Mohammad Sabir Muhibullah	13,470	8.71	New
AIMIM	Shaikh Firoz Bashir	3,775	2.44	New
BSP	Damodar Anil Mahadu	1,823	1.18	▼17.40
Independent	Vishwas Ravandale Patil	1,691	1.09	New
NOTA	None of the Above	878	0.57	New
Margin of victory		12,928	8.36	▼12.71
Turnout		156,056	54.53	▲3.46
Total valid votes		154,711		
Registered electors		286,187		▲6.14
BJP gain from LS		Swing	▼6.32	

=== Assembly Election 2009 ===
2009 Maharashtra Legislative Assembly election : Dhule City
Party	Candidate	Votes	%	±%
LS	Anil Anna Gote	59,576	43.67	New
NCP	Kadambande Rajvardhan Raghujirao	30,835	22.60	New
BSP	Khan Mohammad Sabir Muhibullah	25,340	18.57	New
SS	Kele Gopal Kashinath (Bapu Kele)	17,771	13.03	New
Margin of victory		28,741	21.07	
Turnout		136,698	50.70	
Total valid votes		136,426		
Registered electors		269,624		
LS win (new seat)				

== See also ==
- Dhule Assembly constituency
- Dhule
- List of constituencies of the Maharashtra Legislative Assembly
