= Dhule Lok Sabha constituency =

Lok Sabha constituency in Maharashtra

Coordinates: 20.9°N 74.8°E

Dhule
- Lok Sabha constituency
- Map of Dhule Lok Sabha constituency

Constituency details
- Country: India
- Region: Western India
- State: Maharashtra
- Assembly constituencies: Dhule Rural; Dhule City; Sindkheda; Malegaon Central; Malegaon Outer; Baglan
- Established: 1957 (69 years ago)
- Total electors: 20,22,061
- Reservation: None

Member of Parliament
- 18th Lok Sabha
- Incumbent Shobha Dinesh Bachhav
- Party: Indian National Congress
- Elected year: 2024
- Preceded by: Subhash Bhamre

Dhule is one of the 48 Lok Sabha (parliamentary) constituencies of Maharashtra state in western India.

== Assembly segments ==
At present, after the implementation of the Presidential notification on delimitation on 19 February 2008, Dhule Lok Sabha constituency comprises six Vidhan Sabha (legislative assembly) segments. These segments are:

Constituency number	Name	Reserved for (SC/ST/None)	District	Party	2024 Lead
6	Dhule Rural	None	Dhule	BJP	BJP
7	Dhule City	None	Dhule	BJP	BJP
8	Sindkheda	None	Dhule	BJP	BJP
114	Malegaon Central	None	Nashik	AIMIM	INC
115	Malegaon Outer	None	Nashik	SHS	BJP
116	Baglan	ST	Nashik	BJP	BJP

== Members of Parliament ==
Year	Name	Party
1957	Uttamrao Patil	Bharatiya Jana Sangh
1962	Chudaman Ananda Patil	Indian National Congress
1967	Chudaman Ananda Patil	Indian National Congress
1971	Chudaman Ananda Patil	Indian National Congress
1977	Vijaykumar Naval Patil	Indian National Congress
1980	Reshma Bhoye	Indian National Congress
1984	Reshma Bhoye	Indian National Congress
1989	Reshma Bhoye	Indian National Congress
1991	Bapu Hari Chaure	Indian National Congress
1996	Sahebrao Bagul	Bharatiya Janata Party
1998	Dhanaji Ahire	Indian National Congress
1999	Ramdas Gavit	Bharatiya Janata Party
2004	Bapu Hari Chaure	Indian National Congress
2009	Pratap Sonawane	Bharatiya Janata Party
2014	Subhash Bhamre	Bharatiya Janata Party
2019	Subhash Bhamre	Bharatiya Janata Party
2024	Shobha Dinesh Bachhav	Indian National Congress

== Election results ==
=== 2024 ===
2024 Indian general elections: Dhule
Party	Candidate	Votes	%	±%
INC	Bachhav Shobha Dinesh	583,866	47.89	▲12.47
BJP	Subhash Ramrao Bhamre	5,80,035	47.57	▼8.97
Independent	Bharat Baburao Jadhav	19,713	1.62	N/A
BSP	Zahoor Ahamad Mohamad Yusuf	4,973	0.41	▼0.02
NOTA	None of the Above	4,693	0.38	▲0.15
Majority		3,831	0.31	▼20.81
Turnout		12,19,295	60.30	▲3.28
INC gain from BJP		Swing		

=== 2019 ===
2019 Indian general elections: Dhule
Party	Candidate	Votes	%	±%
BJP	Subhash Ramrao Bhamre	613,533	56.54	+2.69
INC	Kunal Rohidas Patil	3,84,290	35.42	−5.14
VBA	Nabi Ahmad Ahmadullah	39,449	3.64	+3.64
BSP	Sanjay Aparanti	4,645	0.43	N/A
Loksangram Party(LKSGM)	Anil Anna Gote	8,418	0.78	+0.78
NOTA	None of the Above	2,475	0.23	N/A
Majority		2,29,243	+21.12	
Turnout		10,88,578	57.05	N/A
BJP hold		Swing		

=== General elections 2014 ===
2014 Indian general elections: Dhule
Party	Candidate	Votes	%	±%
BJP	Dr. Subhash Ramrao Bhamre	529,450	53.85	
INC	Amarishbhai Rasiklal Patel	3,98,727	40.56	
BSP	Yogesh Yaswant Ishi	9,897	1.01	
AAP	Nihal Ahmed Ansari	9,339	0.95	
Majority		1,30,723	13.29	
Turnout		9,83,083	58.68	
BJP hold		Swing		

=== General elections 2009 ===
2009 Indian general elections: Dhule
Party	Candidate	Votes	%	±%
BJP	Pratap Narayanrao Sonawane	263,260	39.30	
INC	Amarishbhai Rasiklal Patel	2,43,841	36.40	
JD(S)	Molvi Mohammed Usman	72,738	10.86	
Loksangram Party(LKSGM)	Anil Anna Gote	53,637	8.01	
BSP	Rizwan Mohammed Akbar	11,606	1.73	
Majority		19,419	2.90	
Turnout		6,69,906	42.53	
BJP gain from INC		Swing		

== See also ==
- Dhule district
- Nashik district
- List of constituencies of the Lok Sabha
