= Shah Faruk Anwar =

Indian politician

Member of Maharashtra Legislative Assembly
- In office 24 October 2019 – 23 November 2024
- Preceded by: Anil Gote
- Succeeded by: Anup Agrawal
- Constituency: Dhule City

Deputy Mayor of Dhule Municipal Corporation
- In office 2013–2016

Member of Maharashtra State Board of Waqf
- In office December 2021 – November 2024

Personal details
- Born: 3 June 1973 (age 52) Dhule
- Party: All India Majlis-e-Ittehadul Muslimeen
- Other political affiliations: NCP (2013–2017) BJP (2017-2019)
- Website: http://www.farukshah.com

Shah Faruk Anwar is an Indian politician in the All India Majlis-e-Ittehadul Muslimeen party. He was elected as a member of the Maharashtra Legislative Assembly from Dhule City on 24 October 2019. Due To The efforts of Sameer Shaikh (AIMIM Youth Icon), he joined the AIMIM Party on 19 August 2019 Former Deputy Mayor Dhule Municipal Corporation he won the 2019 assembly elections by 3307 votes against independent candidate Rajwardhan. He is a member of the Maharashtra State Board of Waqf. he joined the AIMIM Party on 19 August 2019. He lost in 2024 election to BJP candidate Anup Agarawal by 45,750 votes.

Shah was elected as the MLA of Dhule City in the 14th Legislative Assembly of Maharashtra. Dhule City, with a population comprising over 30% from the minority community, witnessed a historic win as a Muslim candidate emerged victorious after 85 years.

== Political career ==
In the 2019 Maharashtra state assembly elections in Dhule City, Shah of the All India Majlis-e-Ittehadul Muslimeen (AIMIM) party secured a noteworthy victory with 46,679 votes, accounting for 28.93% of the total vote share. His performance marked a significant increase of 26.53% in votes compared to the previous election. This outcome signaled a shift in local political dynamics and reflected his growing influence and popularity among constituents, contributing to his promising political career.

However in 2024 Maharashtra state assembly elections in Dhule City, Shah lost to BJP candidate Anup Agarawal getting 70,788 votes and losing by 45,750 votes.

Shah's party affiliations have been diverse throughout his political journey. He was associated with the Nationalist Congress Party (NCP) from 2013 to 2017, before joining the All India Majlis-e-Ittehadul Muslimeen (AIMIM) in 2019, where he continues to be an active member. His political career reflects his adaptability and willingness to align with various parties to best serve his constituents.

== See also ==
- Imtiyaz Jaleel
- Waris Pathan
- Mohammed Ismail Abdul Khalique
