= Dhule Municipal Corporation =

Local civic body in Dhule, Maharashtra, India

Type
- Type: Municipal Corporation

History
- Founded: 30 June 2003

Leadership
- Mayor: Mayadevi Pardeshi, BJP
- Deputy Mayor: Kalyani Apalkar, BJP
- Municipal Commissioner: Nitin Kapadnis (M.U.A.S.)

Structure
- Seats: 74
- Political groups: Government (50): BJP (50); Opposition (24): AIMIM (10); NCP (8); SHS (5); IND (1)

Elections
- Last election: 15 January 2026
- Next election: 2031

Website
- www.dhulecorporation.org

The Dhule Municipal Corporation is the governing body of the city of Dhule in the Indian state of Maharashtra. The municipal corporation consists of democratically elected members, is headed by a mayor and administers the city's infrastructure, public services and police. Members from the state's leading various political parties hold elected offices in the corporation. Municipal Corporation mechanism in India was introduced during British Rule with formation of municipal corporation in Madras (Chennai) in 1688, later followed by municipal corporations in Bombay (Mumbai) and Calcutta (Kolkata) by 1762. Dhule Municipal Corporation has been formed with functions to improve the infrastructure of town.

== Revenue sources ==
The following are the Income sources for the Corporation from the Central and State Government.

=== Revenue from taxes ===
Following is the Tax related revenue for the corporation.

- Property tax.
- Profession tax.
- Entertainment tax.
- Grants from Central and State Government like Goods and Services Tax.
- Advertisement tax.

=== Revenue from non-tax sources ===
Following is the Non Tax related revenue for the corporation.

- Water usage charges.
- Fees from Documentation services.
- Rent received from municipal property.
- Funds from municipal bonds

== List of Mayor ==
#	Name	Term			Election	Party
1	Bhagwan Rambhau Karnkal	30 December 2003	3 November 2006	2 years, 308 days	2003	Shiv Sena
2	K. D. Mistry	4 December 2006	31 December 2008	2 years, 27 days	2003	Shiv Sena
3	Mohan Tulshiram Navle	31 December 2008	30 June 2011	2 years, 181 days	2008	
4	Manjula Tulshiram Gavit	1 July 2011	30 December 2008	2 years, 182 days	2008	
5	Jayshree Kamlakar Ahirrao	31 December 2013	30 June 2016	2 years, 182 days	2013	
6	Kalpana Sunil Mahale	1 July 2016	1 January 2019	2 years, 184 days	2013	
7	Chandrakant Sonar	1 January 2019	30 June 2021	2 years, 180 days	2018	Bharatiya Janata Party
8	Pradeep Karpe	17 September 2021	1 January 2023	2 years, 105 days	2018	Bharatiya Janata Party
9	Pratibhatai Chaudhari	6 February 2023	6 September 2023	212 days	2018	Bharatiya Janata Party
10	Mayadevi Pardeshi	6 February 2026	Present	165 days	2026	Bharatiya Janata Party

== List of Deputy Mayor ==
#	Name	Term			Election	Party
1	Shah Faruk Anwar	2013	2016	3 years, 0 days	2018	Nationalist Congress Party
2	Nagsen Borse	2022	2025	2 years, 286 days	2022	Bharatiya Janata Party
3	Kalyani Apalkar	2026	Incumbent	165 days	2026	Bharatiya Janata Party

== Administration ==
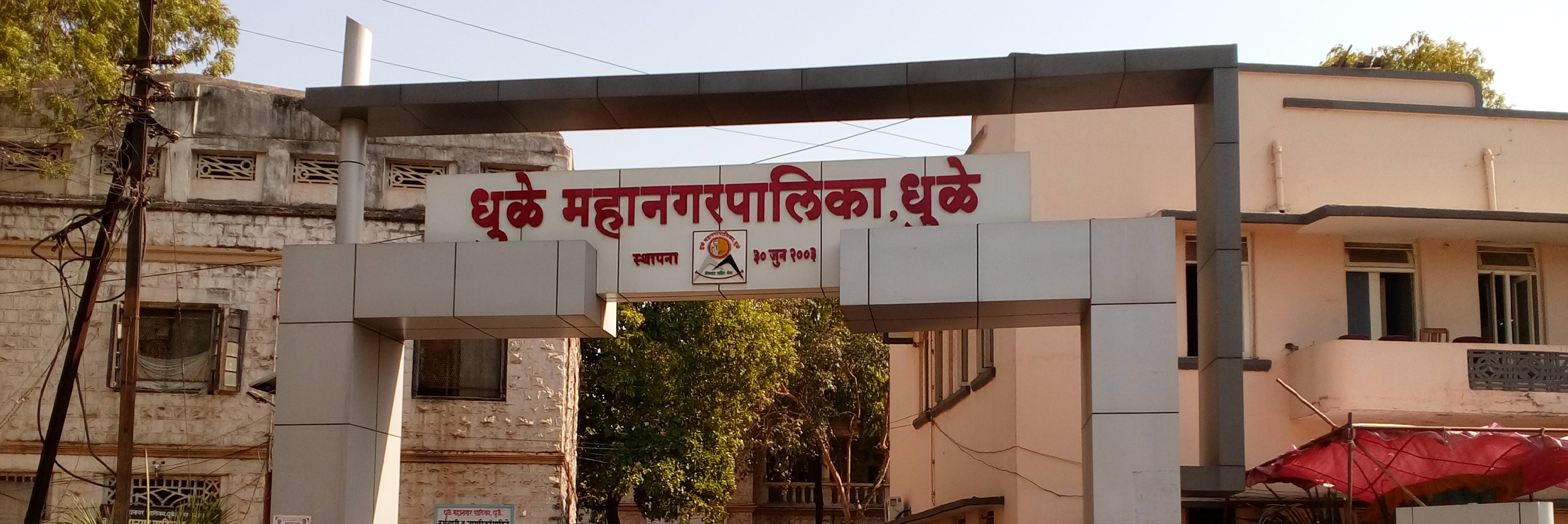
Dhule Municipal Corporation

The Dhule Municipal Corporation is headed by a Municipal Commissioner, generally a senior officer from Maharashtra Urban Administrative Services. The commissioner wields the executive power of the house. A quinquennial election is held to elect corporators to power. The corporators are responsible for overseeing that their constituencies have the basic civic infrastructure in place, and that there is no lacuna on the part of the authorities. The mayor is the head of the house, who is usually from the majority party. All administrative business in the municipal corporation is conducted in Marathi. Nitin Kapadnis Commissioner

== Corporation Election Results ==
=== 2026 Election Result ===
S.No.	Party name	Party flag or symbol	Number of Corporators
01	Bharatiya Janata Party (BJP)		50
02	Nationalist Congress Party (NCP)		08
03	Shiv Sena (SHS)		05
04	All India Majlis-e-Ittehadul Muslimeen (AIMIM)		10
05	Independent		01

=== 2018 Election Result ===
S.No.	Party name	Party flag or symbol	Number of Corporators
01	Bharatiya Janata Party (BJP)		50
02	Nationalist Congress Party (NCP)		08
03	Indian National Congress (INC)		06
04	All India Majlis-e-Ittehadul Muslimeen (AIMIM)		04
05	Lok Sangram Party		01
06	Shiv Sena (SS)		01
07	Bahujan Samaj Party		01
08	Independent		01

=== 2013 Election Result ===
S.No.	Party name	Party flag or symbol	Number of Corporators
01	Nationalist Congress Party (NCP)		34
02	Shiv Sena (SS)		11
03	Indian National Congress (INC)		07
04	Bharatiya Janata Party (BJP)		03
05	Lok Sangram Party		01
06	Bahujan Samaj Party		01
07	Samajwadi Party		03
08	All India Majlis-e-Ittehadul Muslimeen (AIMIM)		00
09	Independent		10
