= Bachhav Shobha Dinesh =

Indian politician

Dr. Shobha Dinesh Bachhav

Member of Parliament, Lok Sabha
- Incumbent
- Assumed office June 2024
- Preceded by: Subhash Bhamre
- Constituency: Dhule

Member of Maharashtra Legislative Assembly
- In office (2004–2009)
- Preceded by: Daulatrao Aher
- Constituency: Nashik Assembly constituency

Mayor of Nashik Municipal Corporation
- In office (20 March 1999 – 15 March 2002)

Personal details
- Born: 29 September 1959 (age 67) Dhule, Maharastra
- Party: Indian National Congress
- Spouse: Dinesh Motiram Bachhav
- Children: 1 Son, 2 Daughters
- Parent(s): Laxmanrao Bhau Patil, Nirmala

Dr. Shobha Dinesh Bachhav is an Indian politician. She is a Member of Parliament from Dhule Lok Sabha Constituency. She became a member of Maharashtra State legislative Assembly from Nashik in 2004. She is a member of Indian National Congress.

== Political career ==
Shobhatai Bachhav was the Mayor of Nashik Municipal Corporation and was Member of Nashik Municipal Corporation from 1990 till 2002 then she was elected as a Member of the Legislative Assembly from Nashik Assembly constituency in 2004. She was also a MoS for Health in Maharashtra State Government. Bachhav was elected as a Member of Parliament from Dhule Lok Sabha Constituency in the 2024 Indian general election, defeating Subhash Bhamre of the Bharatiya Janta Party by a margin of over 3000 votes.
