= Anup Agrawal (politician) =

Indian politician

Member of the Maharashtra Legislative Assembly
- Incumbent
- Assumed office 23 November 2024
- Preceded by: Shah Faruk Anwar
- Constituency: Dhule City

Personal details
- Political party: Bharatiya Janata Party
- Profession: Politician

Anupbhaiyya Omprakash Agrawal commonly "Anup Agrawal" is an Indian politician from Maharashtra. He is a member of the Maharashtra Legislative Assembly from 2024, representing Dhule City Assembly constituency as a member of the Bharatiya Janata Party, BJP.

== See also ==
- List of chief ministers of Maharashtra
- Maharashtra Legislative Assembly
