= Nashik Municipal Corporation =

Governing elected body of the city of Nashik, Maharashtra, India

Type
- Type: Municipal Corporation of the Nashik

History
- Founded: 7 November 1982; 44 years ago
- Preceded by: Nashik Municipal Council (1864–1982)

Leadership
- Mayor: Himgauri Aher, Bharatiya Janata Party
- Municipal commissioner and administrator: Manisha Khatri IAS
- Deputy mayor: Vilas Shinde, Shiv Sena

Structure
- Seats: 122
- Political groups: Government (98): BJP (72); SHS (26); Opposition (24): SS(UBT) (15); NCP (5); INC (3); MNS (1)

Elections
- Last election: 15 January 2026
- Next election: 2031

Meeting place
- Rajiv Gandhi Bhavan, Sharanpur Road, Nashik-422002

Website
- nmc.gov.in

The Nashik Municipal Corporation(NMC), is the governing body of the city of Nashik in the Indian state of Maharashtra. The municipal corporation consists of democratically elected members, is headed by a mayor and administers the city's infrastructure, public services and police. Members from the state's leading political parties such as the Nationalist Congress Party, Indian National Congress, Shiv Sena, Bhartiya Janata Party, Maharashtra Navnirman Sena and the Communist Party of India (Marxist) hold elected offices in the corporation. Nashik municipal corporation (NMC) is located in Nashik. Nashik Municipal Corporation has been formed with functions to improve the infrastructure of town.

== Jurisdiction ==
The city comes under the Nashik District, Maharashtra. The Collector is in charge of property records and revenue collection for the Central government. Appointed by the State government, the Collector also function as the election officer and conducts general as well as state elections in the city. The Nashik City Police is the law enforcement agency in the city and answers to the Ministry of Home Affairs of the GoM. It is headed by a Police Commissioner, an Indian Police Service (IPS) officer.

== Administration ==
The NMC is headed by an IAS officer who serves as Commissioner, wielding executive power. A quinquennial election is held to elect corporators, who are responsible for basic civic infrastructure and enforcing duty. The Mayor, usually from the majority party, serves as head of the house.

City officials
Title	Incumbent	Since	Appointed/Elected	References
Municipal commissioner and administrator	Manisha Khatri	26 December 2024	Appointed by the GoM	
Commissioner of Police	Sandeep Karnik	24 November 2023	Appointed by the GoM	
Mayor	Himgauri Aher	6 February 2026	Elected	
Deputy Mayor	Vilas Shinde	6 February 2026	Elected	
Leader of the House	Vacant	-		
President of the Standing Committee	Machindra Sanap	25 February 2026	Elected	

== Revenue sources ==
The following are the Income sources for the corporation from the Central and State Government.

=== Revenue from taxes ===
Following is the Tax related revenue for the corporation.

- Property tax.
- Profession tax.
- Entertainment tax.
- Grants from Central and State Government like Goods and Services Tax.
- Advertisement tax.

=== Revenue from non-tax sources ===
Following is the Non Tax related revenue for the corporation.

- Water usage charges.
- Fees from Documentation services.
- Rent received from municipal property.
- Funds from municipal bonds.

== Election results ==
=== 2026 results ===
Seats (122) Election 2026 results. Bharatiya Janata Party (BJP)72 Shiv Sena (SHS)26 Indian National Congress (INC)3 Maharashtra Navnirman Sena (MNS)1 Nationalist Congress Party (NCP)4 Shivsena (UBT) 15 Independents 1

=== 2017 results ===
Election 2017 results.

Party	Seats	+/-
Bharatiya Janata Party (BJP)	66	▲52
Shiv Sena (SHS)	35	▲16
Nationalist Congress Party (NCP)	6	▼14
Indian National Congress (INC)	6	▼9
Maharashtra Navnirman Sena (MNS)	5	▼35
Independents	3	▼2
Total	122	

=== 2012 results ===
The results of Election 2012 are as follows.

Party	Seats
Maharashtra Navnirman Sena (MNS)	40
Nationalist Congress Party (NCP)	20
Shiv Sena (SHS)	19
Indian National Congress (INC)	15
Bharatiya Janata Party (BJP)	14
Communist Party of India (Marxist) (CPIM)	3
Independents	11
Total	122

== List of mayors of Nashik Municipal Corporation ==
S.No.	Name (Party)	Party	From	To
Administrative Rule from 7 March 1982 to 7 March 1992.
01	Shantarambapu Kondaji Wavare	INC	7 March 1992	12 March 1994
02	Pandit Sahadev Khaire	INC	12 March 1994	19 March 1995
03	Uttamrao Nathuji Dhikale	IND	20 March 1995	17 March 1996
04	Prakash Shankarrao Mate	INC	18 March 1996	14 March 1997
05	Vasant Nivrutti Gite	SHS	15 March 1997	16 March 1998
06	Ashok Namdeo Dive	IND	17 March 1998	19 March 1999
07	Shobha Dinesh Bachhav	INC	20 March 1999	15 March 2002
08	Dashrath Dharmaji Patil	SHS	15 March 2002	18 February 2005
09	Balasaheb Mahadu Sanap	BJP	18 February 2005	14 March 2007
10	Vinayak Kishor Pande	IND	15 March 2007	6 December 2009
11	Nayana Babanrao Gholap	SHS	7 December 2009	14 March 2012
12	Yatin Raghunath Wagh	MNS	15 March 2012	12 September 2014
13	Ashok Devram Murtadak	MNS	12 September 2014	15 March 2017
14	Ranjana Popat Bhansi	BJP	15 March 2017	13 November 2019
15	Satish Laxmanrao Kulkarni	BJP	13 November 2019	13 March 2022
Administrative Rule from 13 March 2022 to 06 February 2026.
16	Himgauri Balasaheb Aher (Adke)	BJP	6 February 2026	
