= Dilip Manglu Borse =

Indian politician

Member of Legislative Assembly Maharashtra
- Incumbent
- Assumed office 2019
- Preceded by: Deepika Sanjay Chavan
- Constituency: Baglan

Personal details
- Party: Bharatiya Janata Party
- Profession: Politician

Dilip Manglu Borse is an Indian politician and a member of the 14th Maharashtra Legislative Assembly. He represents Baglan (Vidhan Sabha constituency) and belongs to the Bharatiya Janata Party.
