= Dipika Sanjay Chavan =

Indian politician

Member of Legislative Assembly Maharashtra
- In office 2014–2019
- Preceded by: Umaji Manglu Borse
- Succeeded by: Dilip Manglu Borse
- Constituency: Baglan

Personal details
- Party: Nationalist Congress Party - SP
- Other political affiliations: NCP Ajit Pawar
- Profession: Politician

Dipika Sanjay Chavan is an Indian Politician and was a member of the 13th Maharashtra Legislative Assembly. She represents the Baglan Assembly Constituency. She belongs to the Nationalist Congress Party.

She is a Member of Maharashtra State Commission for Women.
