= Raghavendra Patil =

Indian politician

Raghavendra Manohar Patil (born 1993) is an Indian politician from Maharashtra. He is a member of the Maharashtra Legislative Assembly from Dhule Rural Assembly constituency in Dhule district. He won the 2024 Maharashtra Legislative Assembly election, representing the Bharatiya Janata Party.

== Early life and education ==
Patil is from Dhule, Maharashtra. He is the son of Manohar Dattatray Patil. He completed his B.E. in 2015 at Kavayitri Bahinabai Chaudhari North Maharashtra University.

== Career ==
Patil won from Dhule Rural Assembly constituency representing Bharatiya Janata Party in the 2024 Maharashtra Legislative Assembly election. He polled 170,398 votes and defeated his nearest rival and sitting MLA, Kunal Rohidas Patil of the Indian National Congress, by a margin of 66,320 votes.
