= Subhash Bhamre =

Indian politician

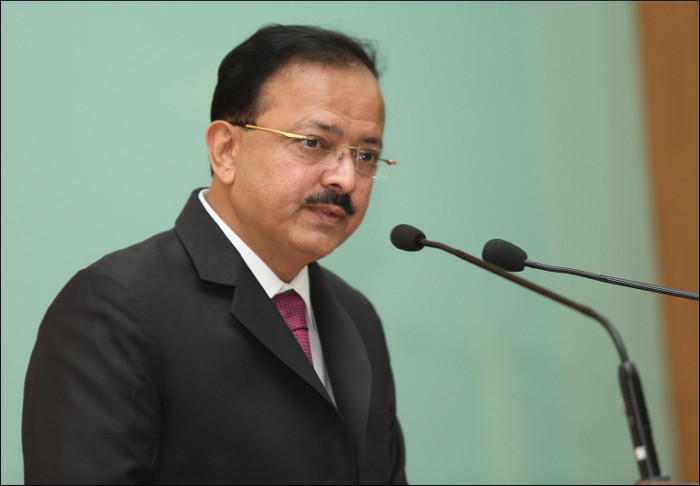

Vice President of Bharatiya Janata Party, Maharashtra
- Incumbent
- Assumed office 18 August 2019

Minister of State for Defence
- In office 5 July 2016 – 30 May 2019
- Prime Minister: Narendra Modi
- Minister: Nirmala Sitharaman
- Preceded by: Rao Inderjit Singh
- Succeeded by: Shripad Yesso Naik

Member of Parliament, Lok Sabha
- In office 16 May 2014 – 4 June 2024
- Preceded by: Pratap Narayanrao Sonawane
- Succeeded by: Bachhav Shobha Dinesh
- Constituency: Dhule

Personal details
- Born: 11 September 1953 (age 72) Sakri, Bombay State, India
- Party: Bharatiya Janata Party
- Spouse: Smt. Bina Bhamre
- Children: 2
- Education: Grant Medical College
- Profession: Politician, Medical Practitioner(Cancer Specialist)
- As of 28 February, 2015

Subhash Ramrao Bhamre (born 11 September 1953) is an Indian politician wo represented the Dhule constituency of Maharashtra from 2014 to 2024. He is a member Bharatiya Janata Party (BJP) political party.

An oncologist by profession, Bhamre did his medical studies in Mumbai at Grant Medical College, JJ Hospital and Tata Cancer Hospital, and wrote a research paper on breast cancer for the International Cancer Conference in Hungary.

Bhamre, and Minister of State Bhagwat Karad, provided emergency medical aid to a passenger while flying onboard Air India Flight 443 from Delhi to Aurangabad on 17 June 2022.

== Political career and background ==
- 18 August 2019: Vice president Maharashtra BJP.
- 16 May 2014: Elected to 16th Lok Sabha
- 1 Sep 2014 onwards: Member, Standing Committee on Health and Family Welfare
- 5 July 2016: Minister of State for Defence
- His mother was the first female MLA of Sakri Vidhan Sabha Constituency.
  - 1972: Gojarbai Ramrao Bhamre, Indian National Congress
