= Kunal Rohidas Patil =

Indian politician

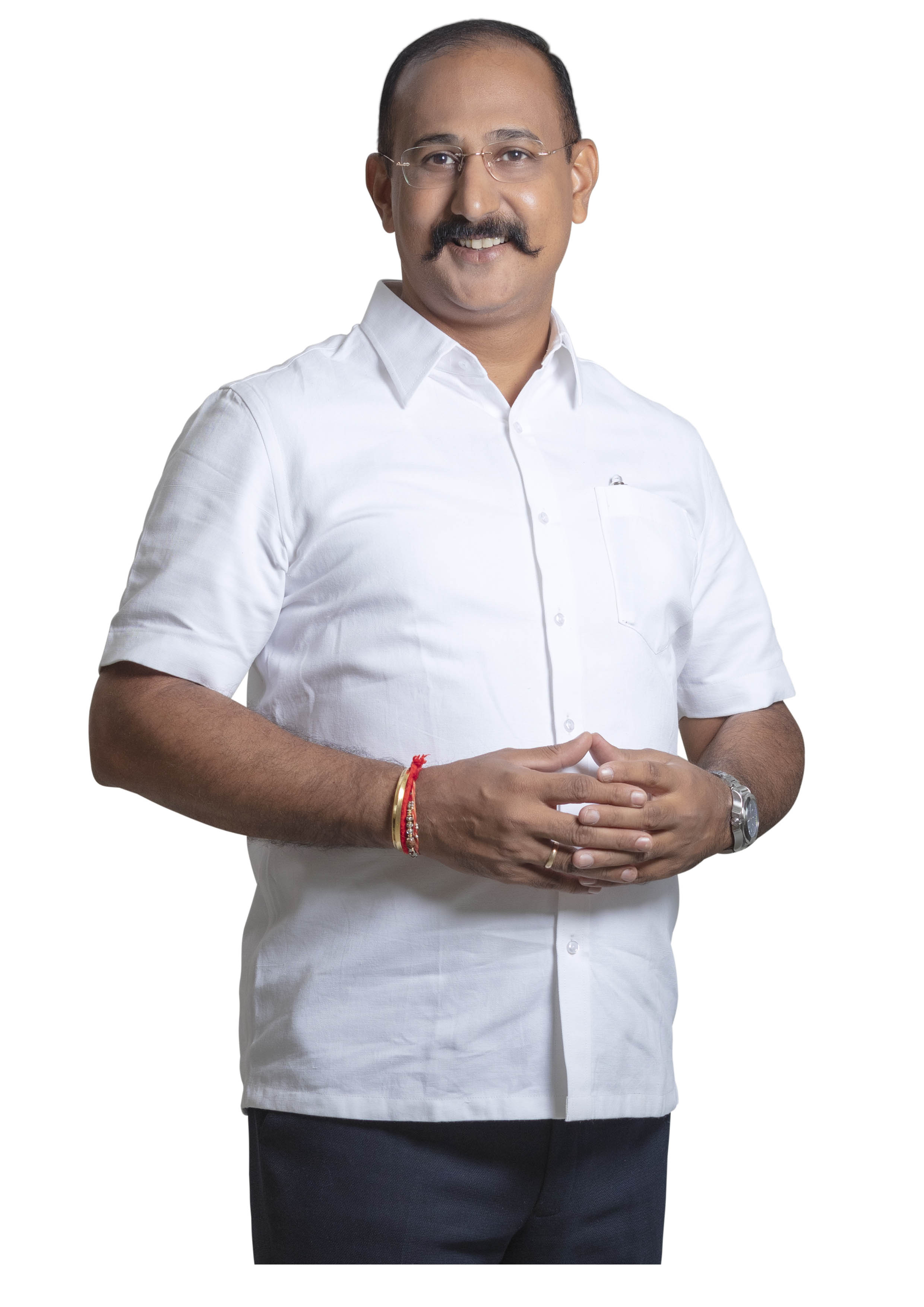

Member of Legislative Assembly Maharashtra
- In office (2014-2019), (2019 – 2024)
- Preceded by: Prof.Sharad Patil
- Succeeded by: Raghavendra Patil
- Constituency: Dhule Rural

Personal details
- Party: Bharatiya Janata Party (2025-Present)
- Other political affiliations: Indian National Congress (Till July 2025)
- Parent: Rohidas Chudaman Patil (Father)

Kunal Rohidas Patil is a member of the 14th Maharashtra Legislative Assembly. He won this constituency for a second time in a row as MLA . He represents the Dhule Rural Assembly Constituency. He belongs to the Bhartiya Janata Party. He is the son of Indian National Congress leader and former minister Rohidas Patil.

He won the Dhule Rural constituency in 2019 in Maharashtra Assembly elections by 14564 votes against BJP candidate Dnyanjyoti Manohar Patil (Bhadane).

Also, on the orders of Congress party leaders, he contested the Lok Sabha elections in 2019 in Dhule Lok Sabha constituency. On 22 March 2017, Patil was suspended along with 18 other MLAs until 31 December for interrupting Maharashtra Finance Minister Sudhir Mungantiwar during a state budget session and burning copies of the budget outside the assembly four days earlier.

Patil has been chairman of Shivaji Vidya Prasarak Sanstha, an over hundred year old educational institution based in Dhule and celebrated Golden Jubilee last year. The Sanstha runs all the professional courses from Primary education to Engineering College, Polytechnic, Arts, Commerce and Science Colleges and 40 schools in the district.
