= Baglan Assembly constituency =

Constituency of the Maharashtra legislative assembly in India

Coordinates: 20.68°N 74.17°E

Baglan
- Constituency No. 116 for the Maharashtra Legislative Assembly

Constituency details
- Country: India
- Region: Western India
- State: Maharashtra
- District: Nashik
- Lok Sabha constituency: Dhule
- Established: 1957
- Total electors: 299,634
- Reservation: ST

Member of Legislative Assembly
- 15th Maharashtra Legislative Assembly
- Incumbent Dilip Manglu Borse
- Party: Bharatiya Janata Party
- Elected year: 2024

Baglan Assembly constituency is one of the 288 Vidhan Sabha (legislative assembly) constituencies of Maharashtra state in western India.

== Members of Legislative Assembly ==
Year	Member	Party
1957	Sonawane Narayan Mansaram	Praja Socialist Party
1962	Pandit Dharma Sonawane	Indian National Congress
1967	Pandit Dharma Sonawane	Indian National Congress
1972	Motabhau Bhamre	Indian National Congress
1978	Laxman Pawar	Indian National Congress (I)
1980	Laxman Pawar	Indian National Congress (I)
1985	Runja Gangurde	Indian Congress (Socialist)
1990	Lahanu Ahire	Indian National Congress
1995	Dilip Borse	Independent
1999	Shankar Ahire	Bharatiya Janata Party
2004	Sanjay Chavan	Independent
2009	Umaji Borse	Bharatiya Janata Party
2014	Dipika Chavan	Nationalist Congress Party
2019	Dilip Borse	Bharatiya Janata Party
2024	Dilip Borse	Bharatiya Janata Party

== Election results ==
=== Assembly Election 2024 ===
2024 Maharashtra Legislative Assembly election : Baglan
Party	Candidate	Votes	%	±%
BJP	Dilip Manglu Borse	159,681	78.30%	▲20.78
NCP-SP	Dipika Sanjay Chavan	30,384	14.90%	New
PHJSP	Garud Jayshree Sahebrao	4,413	2.16%	New
Independent	Bapu Ananda Pawar Sir	2,054	1.01%	New
NOTA	None of the Above	1,573	0.77%	▼0.23
Margin of victory		1,29,297	63.41%	▲42.93
Turnout		2,05,495	68.58%	▲8.60
Total valid votes		2,03,922		
Registered electors		2,99,634		▲8.23
BJP hold		Swing	▲20.78	

=== Assembly Election 2019 ===
2019 Maharashtra Legislative Assembly election : Baglan
Party	Candidate	Votes	%	±%
BJP	Dilip Manglu Borse	94,683	57.52%	▲16.18
NCP	Sau. Dipika Sanjay Chavan	60,989	37.05%	▼6.98
Independent	Rakesh Pandurang Ghode	5,196	3.16%	New
NOTA	None of the Above	1,652	1.00%	▲0.22
Independent	Gulab Mahadu Gavit	1,547	0.94%	New
Independent	Pandit Dodha Borse	1,204	0.73%	New
Margin of victory		33,694	20.47%	▲17.78
Turnout		1,66,329	60.08%	▼3.08
Total valid votes		1,64,600		
Registered electors		2,76,851		▲11.38
BJP gain from NCP		Swing	▲13.49	

=== Assembly Election 2014 ===
2014 Maharashtra Legislative Assembly election : Baglan
Party	Candidate	Votes	%	±%
NCP	Dipika Sanjay Chavan	68,434	44.03%	New
BJP	Borse Dilip Manglu	64,253	41.34%	▼3.99
SS	Sadhana Vasant Gavli	9,108	5.86%	New
INC	Jayshree Machindra Barde	6,946	4.47%	▼3.15
MNS	Mali Bapu Shravan	2,322	1.49%	New
NOTA	None of the Above	1,212	0.78%	New
BSP	Alka Pandit Mali	1,152	0.74%	▼0.35
Margin of victory		4,181	2.69%	▲0.58
Turnout		1,56,638	63.02%	▲11.18
Total valid votes		1,55,424		
Registered electors		2,48,555		▲5.15
NCP gain from BJP		Swing	▼1.30	

=== Assembly Election 2009 ===
2009 Maharashtra Legislative Assembly election : Baglan
Party	Candidate	Votes	%	±%
BJP	Umaji Manglu Borse	55,022	45.33%	▲11.88
Independent	Chavan Sanjay Kantilal	52,460	43.22%	New
INC	Sonawane Somnath Ravan	9,245	7.62%	▼14.61
Independent	Navare Barku Bhavrao	2,270	1.87%	New
BSP	Gaikwad Narayan Ananda	1,328	1.09%	▼2.96
Independent	Annasaheb Dashrath Bagul	1,061	0.87%	New
Margin of victory		2,562	2.11%	▲0.76
Turnout		1,21,438	51.37%	▼1.52
Total valid votes		1,21,386		
Registered electors		2,36,388		▲17.06
BJP gain from Independent		Swing	▲10.53	

=== Assembly Election 2004 ===
2004 Maharashtra Legislative Assembly election : Baglan
Party	Candidate	Votes	%	±%
Independent	Chavan Sanjay Kantilal	37,155	34.80%	New
BJP	Umaji Manglu Borse	35,714	33.45%	▲0.97
INC	Gangurde Rajaram Mahipat	23,732	22.23%	▼0.35
Independent	Bhaudas Maniram Mahale	5,837	5.47%	New
BSP	Dr. Barde Machhindranath Suryabhan	4,333	4.06%	New
Margin of victory		1,441	1.35%	▼8.56
Turnout		1,06,779	52.88%	▲9.13
Total valid votes		1,06,771		
Registered electors		2,01,934		▲2.82
Independent gain from BJP		Swing	▲2.32	

=== Assembly Election 1999 ===
1999 Maharashtra Legislative Assembly election : Baglan
Party	Candidate	Votes	%	±%
BJP	Ahire Shankar Daulat	27,902	32.48%	▲13.74
INC	Sonawane Abhiman Fula	19,392	22.57%	▲0.40
SBP	Borse Dilip Manglu	16,573	19.29%	New
Independent	Chavan Sanjay Kantilal	16,498	19.21%	New
Independent	Pawar Murlidhar Piraji	5,255	6.12%	New
Margin of victory		8,510	9.91%	▼25.47
Turnout		93,770	47.75%	▼23.15
Total valid votes		85,902		
Registered electors		1,96,387		▲16.31
BJP gain from Independent		Swing	▼25.07	

=== Assembly Election 1995 ===
1995 Maharashtra Legislative Assembly election : Baglan
Party	Candidate	Votes	%	±%
Independent	Borase Dilip Mangalu	65,004	57.55%	New
INC	Chavan Sanjay Kantilal	25,047	22.18%	▼21.55
BJP	Pawar Pandit Dada	21,173	18.75%	▼3.02
Independent	Bagul Baraku Ratan	691	0.61%	New
Margin of victory		39,957	35.38%	▲24.77
Turnout		1,17,139	69.38%	▲14.28
Total valid votes		1,12,949		
Registered electors		1,68,847		▲17.32
Independent gain from INC		Swing	▲13.82	

=== Assembly Election 1990 ===
1990 Maharashtra Legislative Assembly election : Baglan
Party	Candidate	Votes	%	±%
INC	Ahire Lahanu Bala	33,111	43.73%	▲4.06
JD	Borse Dilip Mangalu	25,080	33.12%	New
BJP	Dhongade Uttamrao Dashrath	16,484	21.77%	New
Bharatiya Krishi Udyog Sangh	Gazi Mubinkhan Mardankhan	512	0.68%	New
Margin of victory		8,031	10.61%	▼6.84
Turnout		77,541	53.88%	▼8.92
Total valid votes		75,719		
Registered electors		1,43,916		▲24.26
INC gain from IC(S)		Swing	▼13.38	

=== Assembly Election 1985 ===
1985 Maharashtra Legislative Assembly election : Baglan
Party	Candidate	Votes	%	±%
IC(S)	Gangurde Runja Punjaram	40,703	57.11%	New
INC	Ahire Shankar Daulat	28,271	39.67%	New
Independent	Dongar Rama More	1,122	1.57%	New
Margin of victory		12,432	17.44%	▲16.79
Turnout		72,749	62.81%	▲16.37
Total valid votes		71,268		
Registered electors		1,15,816		▲8.97
IC(S) gain from INC(I)		Swing	▲8.88	

=== Assembly Election 1980 ===
1980 Maharashtra Legislative Assembly election : Baglan
Party	Candidate	Votes	%	±%
INC(I)	Pawar Laxman Totaram	23,154	48.24%	▼1.69
INC(U)	Ahire Lahanu Bala	22,838	47.58%	New
Independent	Kuvar Sampatrao Lahu	1,217	2.54%	New
Independent	Gaikwad Punjaram Kalu	791	1.65%	New
Margin of victory		316	0.66%	▼24.50
Turnout		49,259	46.35%	▼19.09
Total valid votes		48,000		
Registered electors		1,06,283		▲10.01
INC(I) hold		Swing	▼1.69	

=== Assembly Election 1978 ===
1978 Maharashtra Legislative Assembly election : Baglan
Party	Candidate	Votes	%	±%
INC(I)	Pawar Laxman Totaram	30,992	49.93%	New
JP	Pimpalse Vasantrao Bhuraji	15,378	24.77%	New
INC	Pawar Tulsiram Dawal	7,897	12.72%	▼49.35
Independent	Talware Nimba Bajan	7,564	12.19%	New
Margin of victory		15,614	25.15%	▼20.23
Turnout		64,643	66.91%	▲0.99
Total valid votes		62,073		
Registered electors		96,612		▲0.66
INC(I) gain from INC		Swing	▼12.14	

=== Assembly Election 1972 ===
1972 Maharashtra Legislative Assembly election : Baglan
Party	Candidate	Votes	%	±%
INC	Mothabhau Gorakh Bhamre	37,682	62.07%	▼2.39
CPI	Udaram Tulshiram Deore	10,127	16.68%	New
Independent	Sampat Lahu Kuvar	4,907	8.08%	New
ABJS	Keshao Gopal More	4,264	7.02%	New
RPI	Pandit Ambar More	3,616	5.96%	▼29.58
Margin of victory		27,555	45.39%	▲16.47
Turnout		62,843	65.48%	▼9.63
Total valid votes		60,711		
Registered electors		95,977		▲24.77
INC hold		Swing	▼2.39	

=== Assembly Election 1967 ===
1967 Maharashtra Legislative Assembly election : Baglan
Party	Candidate	Votes	%	±%
INC	P. D. Patil	36,138	64.46%	▲1.28
RPI	Udaram Tulshiram Deore	19,925	35.54%	▲17.91
Margin of victory		16,213	28.92%	▼16.62
Turnout		58,657	76.26%	▲3.04
Total valid votes		56,063		
Registered electors		76,922		▲8.15
INC hold		Swing	▲1.28	

=== Assembly Election 1962 ===
1962 Maharashtra Legislative Assembly election : Baglan
Party	Candidate	Votes	%	±%
INC	Pandit Dharma Sonawane	31,383	63.18%	New
RPI	Narayan Mansaram Sonawane	8,760	17.63%	New
PSP	Vinayakedu Jaykhedkar	6,662	13.41%	New
Independent	Krishna Bhouru Pawar	2,871	5.78%	New
Margin of victory		22,623	45.54%	
Turnout		53,406	75.09%	
Total valid votes		49,676		
Registered electors		71,125		
INC win (new seat)				

== See also ==
- Baglan
- List of constituencies of Maharashtra Vidhan Sabha
