= Anil Anna Gote =

Indian politician

Member of Maharashtra Legislative Assembly
- In office (1999-2004), (2009-2014), (2014 – 2019)
- Preceded by: Rajwardhan Kadambande
- Succeeded by: Shah Faruk Anwar
- Constituency: Dhule City

Personal details
- Born: 24 May 1947 (age 78) Dhule, Bombay State, India
- Party: Shiv Sena (Uddhav Balasaheb Thackeray)
- Spouse: Hema Gote
- Children: Tejas Gote
- Occupation: Politician

Anil (anna) Gote is an Indian politician and Member of the Legislative Assembly, thrice elected from the Dhule City. He spent four years in jail charged with counterfeiting, but has never been convicted.

== Political career ==
A former journalist, Gote entered the Legislative Assembly in 1999 as a Samajwadi Janata Party candidate, and was part of an attempt to divide the Congress party and weaken the government of the time. He was elected as a BJP Assembly member for Dhule in 2009, and was re-elected in October 2014 with a reduced majority.

On 30 March 2017, Gote demanded that the Maharashtra Legislative Council be scrapped on the basis that the council has no constitutional rights. The opposition parties demanded action be taken against Gote for his remarks.

After that, he chose to become a part of the Nationalist Congress Party. He later resigned from the NCP and contested the 2019 Maharashtra Assembly Election as Loksangram Party candidate but lost the seat to Faruk Shah of MIM. Weeks before the 2024 Maharashtra Assembly Elections, Gote joined the Shiv Sena (UBT), which nominated him as the INDIA alliance candidate from Dhule City seat.

== Counterfeiting allegation ==
In connection with an alleged scheme also involving Abdul Karim Telgi for printing and sale of counterfeit stamps and stamp papers, Gote was arrested in July 2003 and placed in custody at the Yerwada Central Jail in Pune. He was released on bail in June 2007 under a surety of Rs 10 lakh, while the other accused, Suryavanshi, was released on surety of Rs 50,000. The Bombay High Court rejected his application for discharge in 2011, but by October 2014 he had not been convicted of the charges.
