= Vijaykumar Naval Patil =

Indian politician

Vijay Naval Patil (born 5 September 1942, in Navri, Dhule district (Maharashtra)) has been a member of the 6th Lok Sabha from Dhule (Lok Sabha constituency) in Maharashtra State, India.

He was elected to 7th, 8th and 10th Lok Sabha from Erandol (Lok Sabha constituency). He was Union (Dy) Minister for Science & Technology Electronic Space etc. and latter on handled the port folio of Dept. of Communication. He was secretary All India Congress Committee IN-charge of Bihar & Orissa in 1985–86. In Maharashtra- Nominated as President of Rashtriya Ekatmata Samiti (Cabinet Rank) 2002 to 2005.
