= Bapu Hari Chaure =

Indian politician (born 1949)

Chaure Bapu Hari

MH
- Constituency: Dhule

Personal details
- Born: 1 January 1949 (age 77) Dhule, Maharashtra
- Party: INC
- Spouse: Vimalbai Bapu Chaure
- Children: 2 sons and 3 daughters
- As of 16 September, 2006

Chaure Bapu Hari (born 1 January 1949) is a member of the 14th Lok Sabha of India. He represents the Dhule constituency of Maharashtra and is a member of the Indian National Congress (INC) political party.
