= Maval Lok Sabha constituency =

Lok Sabha constituency in Maharashtra

Coordinates: 18.8°N 73.4°E

Maval
- Lok Sabha constituency
- Maval Lok Sabha Constituency map

Constituency details
- Country: India
- Region: Western India
- State: Maharashtra
- District: Pune and Raigad
- Assembly constituencies: Panvel; Karjat; Uran; Maval; Chinchwad; Pimpri
- Established: 2008–present
- Total electors: 25,85,018 (2024)
- Reservation: None

Member of Parliament
- 18th Lok Sabha
- Incumbent Shrirang Barne
- Party: SHS
- Alliance: NDA
- Elected year: 2024
- Preceded by: Gajanan Babar

Maval Lok Sabha constituency is one of the 48 Lok Sabha (lower house of the Indian Parliament) constituencies in Maharashtra state in western India. This constituency was created on 19 February 2008 as a part of the implementation of the presidential notification based on the recommendations of the Delimitation Commission of India constituted on 12 July 2002. It first held elections in 2009 and its first Member of Parliament (MP) was Gajanan Babar of Shiv Sena. Since 2014 election, Shiv Sena's Shrirang Barne has served as the MP.

== Assembly segments ==
Presently, Maval Lok Sabha constituency comprises six Vidhan Sabha (legislative assembly) segments. These segments are:

| No | Name | District | Member | Party | Leading (in 2024) |
|---|---|---|---|---|---|
| 188 | Panvel | Raigad | Prashant Thakur | BJP | SHS |
| 189 | Karjat | Raigad | Mahendra Thorve | SHS | SS(UBT) |
| 190 | Uran | Raigad | Mahesh Baldi | BJP | SS(UBT) |
| 204 | Maval | Pune | Sunil Shelke | NCP | SHS |
| 205 | Chinchwad | Pune | Shankar Jagtap | BJP | SHS |
| 206 | Pimpri (SC) | Pune | Anna Bansode | NCP | SHS |

== Members of Parliament ==
| Year | Name | Party |
|---|---|---|
Till 2008 : Constituency did not exist
| 2009 | Gajanan Babar | Shiv Sena |
| 2014 | Shrirang Barne | Shiv Sena |
| 2019 | Shrirang Barne | Shiv Sena |
| 2024 | Shrirang Barne | Shiv Sena |

== Election results ==
=== 2024 ===
2024 Indian general elections: Maval
| Party | Candidate | Votes | % | ±% |
|---|---|---|---|---|
| SS | Shrirang Barne | 692,832 | 48.81 | ▼3.84 |
| SS(UBT) | Sanjog Waghere Patil | 5,96,217 | 42.00 | New |
| VBA | Madhavitai Naresh Joshi | 27,768 | 1.96 | ▼3.59 |
| BSP | Rajaram Patil | 14,003 | 1.0 | |
| NOTA | None of the above | 16,760 | 1.18 | ▲0.03 |
| Majority | | 96,615 | 6.81 | ▼8.96 |
| Turnout | | 14,20,227 | 54.92 | ▼4.67 |
| SS hold | | Swing | | |

=== 2019 ===
2019 Indian general elections: Maval
| Party | Candidate | Votes | % | ±% |
|---|---|---|---|---|
| SS | Shrirang Barne | 720,663 | 52.65 | +9.03 |
| NCP | Parth Ajit Pawar | 5,04,750 | 36.87 | |
| VBA | Rajaram Patil | 75,904 | 5.55 | |
| NOTA | None of the Above | 15,779 | 1.15 | |
| BSP | Adv. Sanjay Kisan Kanade | 10,197 | 0.74 | |
| Majority | | 2,15,913 | 15.77 | |
| Turnout | | 13,69,456 | 59.59 | −0.52 |
| SS hold | | Swing | | |

=== General election 2014 ===
2014 Indian general elections: Maval
| Party | Candidate | Votes | % | ±% |
|---|---|---|---|---|
| SS | Shrirang Chandu Barne (Appa) | 512,223 | 43.62 | −7.22 |
| PWPI | Laxman Pandurang Jagtap | 3,54,829 | 30.22 | N/A |
| NCP | Rahul Suresh Narwekar | 1,82,293 | 15.52 | −24.09 |
| AAP | Maruti Sahebrao Bhapkar | 30,566 | 2.60 | N/A |
| BSP | Bhimaputra Texas Gaikwad | 25,982 | 2.21 | −0.64 |
| NOTA | None of the above | 11,186 | 0.95 | N/A |
| Margin of victory | | 1,57,394 | 13.40 | +2.17 |
| Turnout | | 11,74,335 | 60.11 | +15.40 |
| SS hold | | Swing | -7.22 | |

=== General election 2009 ===
2009 Indian general elections: Maval
| Party | Candidate | Votes | % | ±% |
|---|---|---|---|---|
| SS | Gajanan Babar | 364,857 | 50.84 | N/A |
| NCP | Azam Pansare | 2,84,238 | 39.61 | N/A |
| BSP | Umakant Mishra | 20,455 | 2.85 | N/A |
| Independent | Maruti Bhapkar | 8,760 | 1.22 | N/A |
| Margin of victory | | 80,619 | 11.23 | N/A |
| Turnout | | 7,17,616 | 44.71 | N/A |
| SS win (new seat) | | | | |

== See also ==
- Khed Lok Sabha constituency
- Pune district
- Raigad district
- List of constituencies of the Lok Sabha
