= Uran Assembly constituency =

Constituency of the Maharashtra legislative assembly in India

Coordinates: 18.894°N 73.008°E

Uran
- Constituency No. 190 for the Maharashtra Legislative Assembly

Constituency details
- Country: India
- Region: Western India
- State: Maharashtra
- District: Raigad
- Lok Sabha constituency: Maval
- Established: 2008
- Total electors: 342,148
- Reservation: None

Member of Legislative Assembly
- 15th Maharashtra Legislative Assembly
- Incumbent Mahesh Baldi
- Party: BJP
- Alliance: NDA
- Elected year: 2024

Uran Assembly constituency is one of the 288 constituencies of the Maharashtra Legislative Assembly in western India. It is one of the seven Vidhan Sabha constituencies located in Raigad district. and comprises the entire Uran tehsil and parts of the Khalapur and Panvel tehsils of the district.

Uran is part of Maval Lok Sabha constituency along with five other Vidhan Sabha constituencies, namely Karjat and Panvel in Raigad district and Maval, Chinchwad and Pimpri in Pune district.

== Members of the Legislative Assembly ==
Year	Member	Party
Until 2008: Constituency did not exist
2009	Vivek Patil	Peasants and Workers Party of India
2014	Manohar Bhoir	Shiv Sena
2019	Mahesh Baldi	Independent
2024	Mahesh Baldi	Bharatiya Janata Party

== Election results ==
=== Assembly Election 2024 ===
2024 Maharashtra Legislative Assembly election : Uran
Party	Candidate	Votes	%	±%
BJP	Mahesh Baldi	95,390	36.56%	New
PWPI	Pritam J. M. Mhatre	88,878	34.07%	▲5.53
SS(UBT)	Manohar Gajanan Bhoir	69,893	26.79%	New
NOTA	None of the Above	2,653	1.02%	▼0.41
MNS	Adv. Satyawan Pandharinath Bhagat	2,461	0.94%	▼1.42
Margin of victory		6,512	2.50%	▼0.15
Turnout		263,548	77.03%	▲2.59
Total valid votes		260,895		
Registered electors		342,148		▲16.30
BJP gain from Independent		Swing	▲2.03	

=== Assembly Election 2019 ===
2019 Maharashtra Legislative Assembly election : Uran
Party	Candidate	Votes	%	±%
Independent	Mahesh Baldi	74,549	34.53%	New
SS	Manohar Gajanan Bhoir	68,839	31.89%	▲3.35
PWPI	Vivekanand Shankar Patil	61,601	28.54%	▲0.41
MNS	Atul Parshuram Bhagat	5,096	2.36%	▲0.54
NOTA	None of the Above	3,077	1.43%	▲0.82
VBA	Adv. Rakesh Narayan Patil	1,713	0.79%	New
Independent	Madhukar Sudam Kadu	1,581	0.73%	New
BSP	Santosh Madhukar Patil	1,358	0.63%	New
Margin of victory		5,710	2.65%	▲2.23
Turnout		218,984	74.44%	▼3.00
Total valid votes		215,870		
Registered electors		294,194		▲15.83
Independent gain from SS		Swing	▲6.00	

=== Assembly Election 2014 ===
2014 Maharashtra Legislative Assembly election : Uran
Party	Candidate	Votes	%	±%
SS	Manohar Gajanan Bhoir	56,131	28.54%	New
PWPI	Vivekanand Shankar Patil	55,320	28.12%	▼25.79
INC	Gharat Mahendra Tukaram	34,253	17.41%	▼23.34
BJP	Baldi Mahesh	32,632	16.59%	New
MNS	Atul Parshuram Bhagat	3,583	1.82%	New
NCP	Prashant Balkrushan Patil	3,215	1.63%	New
SP	Dipak Shankar Patil	1,869	0.95%	New
NOTA	None of the Above	1,199	0.61%	New
Margin of victory		811	0.41%	▼12.75
Turnout		197,930	77.93%	▲9.19
Total valid votes		196,694		
Registered electors		253,996		▲13.95
SS gain from PWPI		Swing	▼25.38	

=== Assembly Election 2009 ===
2009 Maharashtra Legislative Assembly election : Uran
Party	Candidate	Votes	%	±%
PWPI	Vivekanand Shankar Patil	82,017	53.92%	New
INC	Mhatre Shyam Padaji	61,992	40.75%	New
BSP	Mhatre Sham Gajanan	2,380	1.56%	New
BBM	Ushatai Pandurang Kamble	2,266	1.49%	New
Independent	Gajanan Balaram Tandel	1,745	1.15%	New
Independent	Kadu Madhukar Sudam	1,718	1.13%	New
Margin of victory		20,025	13.16%	
Turnout		152,211	68.29%	
Total valid votes		152,118		
Registered electors		222,892		
PWPI win (new seat)				

== See also ==
- Uran
- List of constituencies of Maharashtra Vidhan Sabha
