= List of by-elections to the Maharashtra Legislative Assembly =

The following is a list of by-elections held for the Maharashtra Legislative Assembly, India, since its formation in 1956.

== 13th Assembly ==
=== 2015 ===
S.No	Date	Constituency	MLA before election	Party before election	Elected MLA	Party after election
1	13 February 2015	Mukhed	Govind Rathod	Bharatiya Janata Party	Tushar Rathod	Bharatiya Janata Party
2	11 April 2015	Tasgaon	R. R. Patil	Nationalist Congress Party	Suman Patil	Nationalist Congress Party
3	11 April 2015	Vandre East	Prakash Sawant	Shiv Sena	Trupti Sawant	Shiv Sena

=== 2016 ===
S.No	Date	Constituency	MLA before election	Party before election	Elected MLA	Party after election
1	13 February 2016	Palghar	Krushna Arjun Ghoda	Shiv Sena	Amit Krushna Ghoda	Shiv Sena

=== 2018 ===
S.No	Date	Constituency	MLA before election	Party before election	Elected MLA	Party after election
1	28 May 2018	Palus-Kadegaon	Patangrao Kadam	Indian National Congress	Vishwajeet Kadam	Indian National Congress

== 14th Assembly ==
=== 2021 ===
S.No	Date	Constituency	MLA before election	Party before election	Elected MLA	Party after election
252	17 April 2021	Pandharpur	Bharat Bhalke	Nationalist Congress Party	Samadhan Autade	Bharatiya Janata Party
90	30 October 2021	Deglur	Raosaheb Antapurkar	Indian National Congress	Jitesh Antapurkar	Indian National Congress

=== 2022 ===
Date	S.No	Constituency	MLA before election	Party before election	Elected MLA	Party after election
12 April 2022	82	Kolhapur North	Chandrakant Jadhav	Indian National Congress	Jayshri Jadhav	Indian National Congress
3 November 2022	26	Andheri East	Ramesh Latke	Shiv Sena	Rutuja Latke	Shiv Sena (Uddhav Balasaheb Thackeray)

=== 2023 ===
Date	S.No	Constituency	MLA before election	Party before election	Elected MLA	Party after election	Reason
26 February 2023	205	Chinchwad	Laxman Jagtap	Bharatiya Janata Party	Ashwini Jagtap	Bharatiya Janata Party	Death of Laxman Jagtap
26 February 2023	215	Kasba Peth	Mukta Tilak	Bharatiya Janata Party	Ravindra Dhangekar	Indian National Congress	Death of Mukta Tilak

== 15th Assembly ==
Date	Constituency		Previous MLA		Reason	Elected MLA	
23 April 2026	201	Baramati	Ajit Pawar	Nationalist Congress Party	Died on 28 January 2026	Sunetra Pawar	Nationalist Congress Party
23 April 2026	223	Rahuri	Shivaji Kardile	Bharatiya Janata Party	Died on 17 October 2025	Akshay Shivajirao Kardile	Bharatiya Janata Party
