= Panvel Assembly constituency =

Constituency of the Maharashtra legislative assembly in India

Panvel
- Constituency No. 188 for the Maharashtra Legislative Assembly

Constituency details
- Country: India
- Region: Western India
- State: Maharashtra
- District: Raigad
- Lok Sabha constituency: Maval
- Established: 1955
- Total electors: 652,291
- Reservation: None

Member of Legislative Assembly
- 15th Maharashtra Legislative Assembly
- Incumbent Prashant Thakur
- Party: BJP
- Alliance: NDA
- Elected year: 2024

Panvel Assembly constituency is one of the 288 Vidhan Sabha (legislative assembly) constituencies in Maharashtra state in western India.

== Overview ==
Panvel constituency is one of the seven Vidhan Sabha constituencies located in Raigad district. and comprises a part of Panvel tehsil of the district.

Panvel is part of Maval Lok Sabha constituency along with five other Vidhan Sabha constituencies, namely Karjat and Uran in Raigad district and Maval, Chinchwad and Pimpri in Pune district.

== Members of the Legislative Assembly ==
Year	Member	Party
1957	Dinkar Balu Patil	Peasants and Workers Party of India
1962	Dinkar Balu Patil	Peasants and Workers Party of India
1967	Dinkar Balu Patil	Peasants and Workers Party of India
1972	Dinkar Balu Patil	Peasants and Workers Party of India
1978	Dattatraya Narayan Patil	Peasants and Workers Party of India
1980	Dinkar Balu Patil	Peasants and Workers Party of India
1985	Dattatraya Narayan Patil	Peasants and Workers Party of India
1990	Dattatraya Narayan Patil	Peasants and Workers Party of India
1995	Vivek Shankar Patil	Peasants and Workers Party of India
1999	Vivek Shankar Patil	Peasants and Workers Party of India
2004	Vivek Shankar Patil	Peasants and Workers Party of India
2009	Prashant Ramesh Thakur	Indian National Congress
2014	Prashant Ramesh Thakur	Bharatiya Janata Party
2019	Prashant Ramesh Thakur	Bharatiya Janata Party
2024	Prashant Ramesh Thakur	Bharatiya Janata Party

== Election results ==
=== Assembly Election 2024 ===
2024 Maharashtra Legislative Assembly election : Panvel
Party	Candidate	Votes	%	±%
BJP	Prashant Ramesh Thakur	183,931	48.40%	▼13.35
PWPI	Balaram Dattatreya Patil	132,840	34.95%	▲5.18
SS(UBT)	Leena Arjun Garad	43,989	11.57%	New
MNS	Yogesh Janardan Chile	10,231	2.69%	New
NOTA	None of the Above	3,905	1.03%	▼3.25
Lokmudra Janhit Party	Kantilal Harishchandra Kadu	2,429	0.64%	New
Margin of victory		51,091	13.44%	▼18.52
Turnout		383,964	58.86%	▲6.23
Total valid votes		380,059		
Registered electors		652,291		▲17.00
BJP hold		Swing	▼13.35	

=== Assembly Election 2019 ===
2019 Maharashtra Legislative Assembly election : Panvel
Party	Candidate	Votes	%	±%
BJP	Prashant Ramesh Thakur	179,109	61.74%	▲17.16
PWPI	Haresh Manohar Keni	86,379	29.78%	▼10.10
NOTA	None of the Above	12,399	4.27%	▲3.32
Independent	Haresh S. Keni	8,797	3.03%	New
BSP	Fulchand Mangal Kitke	5,827	2.01%	New
Independent	Arun Ram Mhatre	3,544	1.22%	New
Independent	Kantilal Harishchandra Kadu	2,123	0.73%	New
BMP	Pravin Subhash Patil	1,987	0.68%	▲0.05
Margin of victory		92,730	31.97%	▲27.26
Turnout		302,706	54.30%	▼14.22
Total valid votes		290,082		
Registered electors		557,513		▲31.58
BJP hold		Swing	▲17.16	

=== Assembly Election 2014 ===
2014 Maharashtra Legislative Assembly election : Panvel
Party	Candidate	Votes	%	±%
BJP	Prashant Ramesh Thakur	125,142	44.58%	New
PWPI	Balaram Dattusheth Patil (Balusheth)	111,927	39.87%	▼1.35
SS	Gharat Vasudev Krushna	17,953	6.40%	New
INC	R. C. Gharat	9,269	3.30%	▼45.81
MNS	Kesarinath Vinayak Patil	6,568	2.34%	▼3.03
NCP	Sunil Narayan Gharat	2,732	0.97%	New
NOTA	None of the Above	2,666	0.95%	New
BMP	Pravin Subhash Patil	1,793	0.64%	New
Margin of victory		13,215	4.71%	▼3.18
Turnout		283,377	66.88%	▲4.62
Total valid votes		280,706		
Registered electors		423,716		▲58.97
BJP gain from INC		Swing	▼4.53	

=== Assembly Election 2009 ===
2009 Maharashtra Legislative Assembly election : Panvel
Party	Candidate	Votes	%	±%
INC	Prashant Ramesh Thakur	80,671	49.11%	▲11.62
PWPI	Balaram Dattatreya Patil	67,710	41.22%	▼6.29
MNS	Patil Kesarinath Vinayak	8,818	5.37%	New
Independent	Ramsheth Thakur	1,294	0.79%	New
Independent	Ravindra Kashinath Patil	1,258	0.77%	New
BSP	Thakur Prashant Tukaram	1,167	0.71%	▼0.78
Margin of victory		12,961	7.89%	▼2.12
Turnout		164,299	61.64%	▼3.56
Total valid votes		164,258		
Registered electors		266,533		▼11.77
INC gain from PWPI		Swing	▲1.60	

=== Assembly Election 2004 ===
2004 Maharashtra Legislative Assembly election : Panvel
Party	Candidate	Votes	%	±%
PWPI	Vivek Shankar Patil	93,559	47.51%	▲1.28
INC	Shyam Mhatre	73,836	37.49%	▲2.77
BJP	Balasaheb Patil	17,963	9.12%	▼4.05
Independent	Kantibhai Gangar	3,629	1.84%	New
BSP	Adv.Nagdeve Anil Ramdas	2,944	1.49%	New
RSPS	Dr.Manisha Kondiba Palaskar	2,874	1.46%	New
Margin of victory		19,723	10.02%	▼1.50
Turnout		197,003	65.21%	▲9.84
Total valid votes		196,931		
Registered electors		302,088		▲24.20
PWPI hold		Swing	▲1.28	

=== Assembly Election 1999 ===
1999 Maharashtra Legislative Assembly election : Panvel
Party	Candidate	Votes	%	±%
PWPI	Vivek Shankar Patil	62,237	46.23%	▲7.29
INC	R. C. Gharat	46,741	34.72%	▲3.79
BJP	B. K. Thakur	17,725	13.17%	New
JD(U)	Adv. Madan Ganpat Gowari	5,594	4.16%	New
Independent	Gharat Dilip Ramdas	1,372	1.02%	New
Independent	Gawali Vishnu Babaji	951	0.71%	New
Margin of victory		15,496	11.51%	▲3.49
Turnout		147,843	60.78%	▼15.11
Total valid votes		134,620		
Registered electors		243,231		▲6.81
PWPI hold		Swing	▲7.29	

=== Assembly Election 1995 ===
1995 Maharashtra Legislative Assembly election : Panvel
Party	Candidate	Votes	%	±%
PWPI	Vivek Shankar Patil	62,485	38.95%	▼0.11
INC	Ganapat Ragho Patil Alias G. R. Patil	49,619	30.93%	▼5.83
SS	Patil Baban Kamalu	42,102	26.24%	▲4.20
Independent	Suresh Kamble	1,590	0.99%	New
Independent	Laxman Dasharath Patil	1,213	0.76%	New
Margin of victory		12,866	8.02%	▲5.72
Turnout		165,335	72.60%	▲8.09
Total valid votes		160,442		
Registered electors		227,728		▲21.39
PWPI hold		Swing	▼0.11	

=== Assembly Election 1990 ===
1990 Maharashtra Legislative Assembly election : Panvel
Party	Candidate	Votes	%	±%
PWPI	Dattatraya Narayan Patil	45,693	39.06%	▼15.96
INC	Ganapat Ragho Patil Alias G. R. Patil	43,007	36.76%	▲15.38
SS	Baban Kamalu Patil	25,782	22.04%	New
Independent	Anant Dattatraya Patil	1,074	0.92%	New
Akhil Bhartiya Maratha Mahasangh	Jadhav Dattaji Amrutrao	1,073	0.92%	New
Margin of victory		2,686	2.30%	▼31.35
Turnout		119,809	63.86%	▲9.27
Total valid votes		116,992		
Registered electors		187,606		▲45.21
PWPI hold		Swing	▼15.96	

=== Assembly Election 1985 ===
1985 Maharashtra Legislative Assembly election : Panvel
Party	Candidate	Votes	%	±%
PWPI	Dattatraya Narayan Patil	37,740	55.02%	▲4.19
INC	Gajanan Narayan Patil	14,663	21.38%	New
Independent	Ganpat Ragho Patil	9,982	14.55%	New
Independent	Sudhakar Narayan Patil	3,540	5.16%	New
Independent	Vahulkar Shrirang Devrao	1,145	1.67%	New
Independent	Balaram Goma Bhopi	865	1.26%	New
Margin of victory		23,077	33.64%	▲30.21
Turnout		70,779	54.78%	▲1.11
Total valid votes		68,592		
Registered electors		129,195		▲14.49
PWPI hold		Swing	▲4.19	

=== Assembly Election 1980 ===
1980 Maharashtra Legislative Assembly election : Panvel
Party	Candidate	Votes	%	±%
PWPI	Dinkar Balu Patil	29,819	50.83%	▲17.91
INC(I)	Jaidas Sina Patil	27,802	47.39%	▲30.42
Independent	Gajanan Kathari Mhatre	485	0.83%	New
Margin of victory		2,017	3.44%	▼5.23
Turnout		60,662	53.76%	▼10.53
Total valid votes		58,661		
Registered electors		112,845		▲9.38
PWPI hold		Swing	▲17.91	

=== Assembly Election 1978 ===
1978 Maharashtra Legislative Assembly election : Panvel
Party	Candidate	Votes	%	±%
PWPI	Dattatraya Narayan Patil	21,229	32.92%	▼23.71
INC	Gajanan Narayan Patil	15,637	24.25%	▼19.12
JP	Suresh Thakur	12,628	19.58%	New
INC(I)	Jaidas Sina Patil	10,944	16.97%	New
Independent	Krishna Parsharam Patil	2,859	4.43%	New
Independent	Jadahav Dattaraya Amrutrao	935	1.45%	New
Margin of victory		5,592	8.67%	▼4.59
Turnout		67,417	65.35%	▼1.93
Total valid votes		64,487		
Registered electors		103,164		▲14.15
PWPI hold		Swing	▼23.71	

=== Assembly Election 1972 ===
1972 Maharashtra Legislative Assembly election : Panvel
Party	Candidate	Votes	%	±%
PWPI	Dinkar Balu Patil	32,980	56.63%	▼3.55
INC	Gopal Govind Patil	25,255	43.37%	▲7.97
Margin of victory		7,725	13.27%	▼11.53
Turnout		61,392	67.93%	▲2.79
Total valid votes		58,235		
Registered electors		90,375		▲13.48
PWPI hold		Swing	▼3.55	

=== Assembly Election 1967 ===
1967 Maharashtra Legislative Assembly election : Panvel
Party	Candidate	Votes	%	±%
PWPI	Dinkar Balu Patil	29,546	60.19%	▲12.39
INC	Gajanan Narayan Patil	17,375	35.39%	▲0.49
ABJS	G. P. Chavan	2,170	4.42%	▼0.97
Margin of victory		12,171	24.79%	▲11.91
Turnout		52,658	66.12%	▲7.57
Total valid votes		49,091		
Registered electors		79,637		▲9.16
PWPI hold		Swing	▲12.39	

=== Assembly Election 1962 ===
1962 Maharashtra Legislative Assembly election : Panvel
Party	Candidate	Votes	%	±%
PWPI	Dinkar Balu Patil	18,856	47.79%	▼23.88
INC	Pratapsinha Vishwasrao Chavan	13,772	34.91%	▲6.58
PSP	Keshav Hari Gokhale	4,701	11.92%	New
ABJS	Ramchandra Gopal Patwardhan	2,125	5.39%	New
Margin of victory		5,084	12.89%	▼30.46
Turnout		42,954	58.88%	▼4.66
Total valid votes		39,454		
Registered electors		72,957		▲18.92
PWPI hold		Swing	▼23.88	

=== Assembly Election 1957 ===
1957 Bombay State Legislative Assembly election : Panvel
Party	Candidate	Votes	%	±%
PWPI	Dinkar Balu Patil	25,829	71.67%	New
INC	Panhale Sadashiv Sakharam	10,208	28.33%	New
Margin of victory		15,621	43.35%	
Turnout		36,037	58.74%	
Total valid votes		36,037		
Registered electors		61,350		
PWPI win (new seat)				

== See also ==
- List of constituencies of the Maharashtra Legislative Assembly

== Notes ==
18.9891006°N 73.0319548°E
