= Gautam Chabukswar =

Indian politician

Adv. Gautam Chabukswar
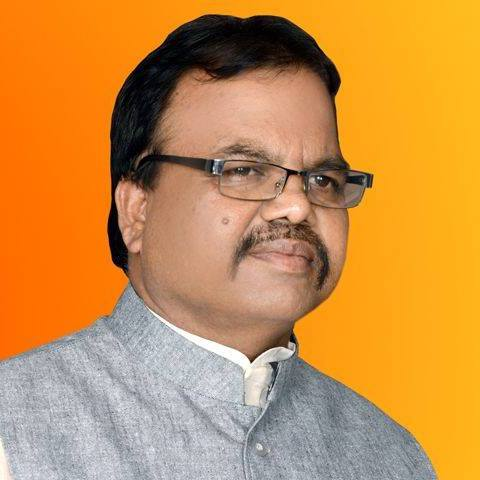

Member of Legislative Assembly of Maharashtra
- In office 2014–2019
- Preceded by: Anna Bansode
- Succeeded by: Anna Bansode
- Constituency: Pimpri

Personal details
- Born: 30 August Pimpri, Pune (Maharashtra)
- Party: Shiv Sena(UBT)
- Education: Ness wadia College of Commerce, Pune (B.com.), (L.L.B.) Symbiosis law school, Pune, (M.A. and M.Phil.) University of Pune

Professor Gautam Chabukswar is a Shiv Sena politician from Pune district, Maharashtra. He is a member of the 13th Maharashtra Legislative Assembly. representing the Pimpri Assembly Constituency. He defeated sitting MLA Anna Bansode who contested from the Nationalist Congress Party along with another 23 candidates. He has completed LLB, B.Com., M.Phil., and M.A. in Pune. He is former SINET member in Savitribai Phule, Pune University and currently Professor in Pune University in Pali Department.

== Positions held ==
- Former boxing champion (national level)
- 1986 to 2007 elected as corporator
- Member in Standing Committee of PCMC for 5 years
- 1987-88 Vice President (UpSabhapati) of Education in Municipal Corporation
- Member of PCMT for 3 years
- Member of Pimpri Chinchwad Navnagar Pradhikaran for 5 years
- President of Pimpri Boxing Association
- Founder Rahul Academy (boxing/football) in PCMC
- Deputy Mayor of Municipal Corporation from 2005 to 2007
- Elected to Congress in 2012, re-elected 5 times
- 2014: Elected to Maharashtra Legislative Assembly from Shivsena
- 2016: CINET Member in Pune University
- Professor in Pune University (Pali Department)

== See also ==
- Maval Lok Sabha constituency
