= Haveli, Maharashtra Assembly constituency =

Former constituency of the Maharashtra legislative assembly in India

Haveli
- Former constituency No. 245 for the Maharashtra Legislative Assembly

Constituency details
- Country: India
- Region: Western India
- State: Maharashtra
- District: Pune
- Established: 1955
- Abolished: 2008

Haveli Vidhan Sabha seat was one of the constituencies of Maharashtra Vidhan Sabha, in India. Haveli seat existed until the 2004 elections after which it was abolished in 2008.

== Members of the Legislative Assembly ==
| Year | Member | Party |
|---|---|---|
| 1957 | Purshottam Choure | Scheduled Castes Federation |
| 1957 | Ram Tupe | Praja Socialist Party |
| 1962 | Marthand Magar | Indian National Congress |
| 1967 | Marthand Magar | Indian National Congress |
| 1972 | Marthand Magar | Indian National Congress |
| 1978 | Sopan Phuge | Janata Party |
| 1980 | Motiram Pawar | Indian National Congress |
| 1985 | Ashok Tapkir | Indian National Congress |
| 1990 | Dynaneshwar Landge | Indian National Congress |
| 1995 | Gajanan Babar | Shiv Sena |
| 1999 | Gajanan Babar | Shiv Sena |
| 2004 | Vilas Lande | Nationalist Congress Party |
2008 onwards: Constituency defunct

== Election results ==
=== Assembly Election 2004 ===
2004 Maharashtra Legislative Assembly election : Haveli
| Party | Candidate | Votes | % | ±% |
|---|---|---|---|---|
| NCP | Vilas Vithoba Lande | 149,057 | 47.12% | ▲12.87 |
| SS | Gajanan Dharmshi Babar | 131,981 | 41.72% | ▲2.75 |
| Independent | Pathare Pandharinath Tukaram | 14,539 | 4.60% | New |
| BSP | Amarsinh Jyotajirao Jadhavrao | 9,228 | 2.92% | ▲2.30 |
| Independent | Yashwant Anantrao Bhosale | 3,250 | 1.03% | New |
| Independent | Sudam Sakharam Sonavane | 1,905 | 0.60% | New |
| Margin of victory | | 17,076 | 5.40% | ▲0.68 |
| Turnout | | 316,355 | 39.26% | ▼9.87 |
| Total valid votes | | 316,344 | | |
| Registered electors | | 805,778 | | ▲52.14 |
| NCP gain from SS | | Swing | ▲8.15 | |

=== Assembly Election 1999 ===
1999 Maharashtra Legislative Assembly election : Haveli
| Party | Candidate | Votes | % | ±% |
|---|---|---|---|---|
| SS | Gajanan Dharmshi Babar | 101,389 | 38.97% | ▲3.71 |
| NCP | Azambhai Pansare | 89,120 | 34.25% | New |
| INC | Hanumant Gawade | 64,543 | 24.81% | ▼7.97 |
| BSP | B. B. Shinde | 1,612 | 0.62% | New |
| Margin of victory | | 12,269 | 4.72% | ▲2.23 |
| Turnout | | 269,879 | 50.96% | ▼13.96 |
| Total valid votes | | 260,189 | | |
| Registered electors | | 529,638 | | ▲7.00 |
| SS hold | | Swing | ▲3.71 | |

=== Assembly Election 1995 ===
1995 Maharashtra Legislative Assembly election : Haveli
| Party | Candidate | Votes | % | ±% |
|---|---|---|---|---|
| SS | Gajanan Dharmshi Babar | 110,104 | 35.26% | ▲13.49 |
| INC | Ramkrishna More | 102,356 | 32.78% | ▼4.08 |
| Independent | Landge Dnyaneshwar Pandurang | 43,581 | 13.96% | New |
| JD | S. S. Dhavade Master | 9,090 | 2.91% | ▼7.25 |
| Independent | Rajan Nayar | 9,011 | 2.89% | New |
| BBM | Sureshbhai Ramchandra Sonawane | 6,115 | 1.96% | New |
| RPI | Mandakini Vishnu Rokade | 5,372 | 1.72% | New |
| Margin of victory | | 7,748 | 2.48% | ▼10.82 |
| Turnout | | 318,652 | 64.37% | ▲12.43 |
| Total valid votes | | 312,277 | | |
| Registered electors | | 495,004 | | ▲24.21 |
| SS gain from INC | | Swing | ▼1.60 | |

=== Assembly Election 1990 ===
1990 Maharashtra Legislative Assembly election : Haveli
| Party | Candidate | Votes | % | ±% |
|---|---|---|---|---|
| INC | Landge Dnyaneshwar Pandurang | 74,413 | 36.86% | ▼10.52 |
| Independent | Nair Rajan Krishna | 47,560 | 23.56% | New |
| SS | Lande Bajirao Dhondiba | 43,954 | 21.77% | New |
| JD | Baba Dhapte | 20,513 | 10.16% | New |
| INS(SCS) | N. R. Shinde | 11,205 | 5.55% | New |
| Margin of victory | | 26,853 | 13.30% | ▲3.43 |
| Turnout | | 204,767 | 51.38% | ▼3.04 |
| Total valid votes | | 201,889 | | |
| Registered electors | | 398,512 | | ▲67.01 |
| INC hold | | Swing | ▼10.52 | |

=== Assembly Election 1985 ===
1985 Maharashtra Legislative Assembly election : Haveli
| Party | Candidate | Votes | % | ±% |
|---|---|---|---|---|
| INC | Tapkir Ashok Kalyanrao | 60,706 | 47.38% | New |
| JP | Landage Balasaheb Shankar | 48,052 | 37.50% | ▲19.34 |
| Independent | Gajanan Dharmshi Babar | 6,285 | 4.90% | New |
| Independent | Ohol Sampatrao Buvajirao | 3,369 | 2.63% | New |
| Independent | Satav Dashrathrao Bhivaba | 2,404 | 1.88% | New |
| Independent | Manohar Ashok Balkrishan | 1,659 | 1.29% | New |
| Independent | Kambale Manav Shripati | 1,386 | 1.08% | New |
| Margin of victory | | 12,654 | 9.88% | ▲8.54 |
| Turnout | | 129,990 | 54.48% | ▲11.02 |
| Total valid votes | | 128,135 | | |
| Registered electors | | 238,620 | | ▲34.74 |
| INC gain from INC(I) | | Swing | ▲15.34 | |

=== Assembly Election 1980 ===
1980 Maharashtra Legislative Assembly election : Haveli
| Party | Candidate | Votes | % | ±% |
|---|---|---|---|---|
| INC(I) | Motiram Pawar | 24,218 | 32.04% | ▲21.61 |
| INC(U) | Ashok Mhaske | 23,210 | 30.71% | New |
| JP | Balasaheb Shankar Landge | 13,724 | 18.16% | ▼30.81 |
| Independent | Shinde N. R. | 9,679 | 12.81% | New |
| Independent | Bapu Gawade | 2,156 | 2.85% | New |
| RPI(K) | Barathe Jagannath Gulab | 1,855 | 2.45% | New |
| Independent | Mulani Shahida Karim | 743 | 0.98% | New |
| Margin of victory | | 1,008 | 1.33% | ▼11.58 |
| Turnout | | 77,207 | 43.60% | ▼19.00 |
| Total valid votes | | 75,585 | | |
| Registered electors | | 177,098 | | ▲29.42 |
| INC(I) gain from JP | | Swing | ▼16.93 | |

=== Assembly Election 1978 ===
1978 Maharashtra Legislative Assembly election : Haveli
| Party | Candidate | Votes | % | ±% |
|---|---|---|---|---|
| JP | Phuge Sopan Tukaram | 41,325 | 48.97% | New |
| INC | Landage Dnyaneshwar Pandurang | 30,424 | 36.05% | ▼47.67 |
| INC(I) | Jagtap Pandurang Bhaguji | 8,800 | 10.43% | New |
| Independent | Sareen Subhash Haribharat | 2,100 | 2.49% | New |
| Independent | Chandiramani K. U. | 749 | 0.89% | New |
| Margin of victory | | 10,901 | 12.92% | ▼54.52 |
| Turnout | | 86,375 | 63.12% | ▲4.46 |
| Total valid votes | | 84,393 | | |
| Registered electors | | 136,835 | | ▲3.81 |
| JP gain from INC | | Swing | ▼34.75 | |

=== Assembly Election 1972 ===
1972 Maharashtra Legislative Assembly election : Haveli
| Party | Candidate | Votes | % | ±% |
|---|---|---|---|---|
| INC | Martand Dhondiba Magar | 63,136 | 83.72% | ▲22.47 |
| SSP | Marutrao Kale | 12,280 | 16.28% | New |
| Margin of victory | | 50,856 | 67.43% | ▲34.87 |
| Turnout | | 77,839 | 59.05% | ▼6.91 |
| Total valid votes | | 75,416 | | |
| Registered electors | | 131,813 | | ▲41.24 |
| INC hold | | Swing | ▲22.47 | |

=== Assembly Election 1967 ===
1967 Maharashtra Legislative Assembly election : Haveli
| Party | Candidate | Votes | % | ±% |
|---|---|---|---|---|
| INC | Martand Dhondiba Magar | 36,656 | 61.25% | ▲10.16 |
| SSP | J. V. Bhosole | 17,165 | 28.68% | New |
| ABJS | N. S. Mirzani | 5,099 | 8.52% | ▲5.76 |
| Independent | S. D. Ghule | 930 | 1.55% | New |
| Margin of victory | | 19,491 | 32.57% | ▲19.66 |
| Turnout | | 62,770 | 67.26% | ▲1.90 |
| Total valid votes | | 59,850 | | |
| Registered electors | | 93,328 | | ▲10.20 |
| INC hold | | Swing | ▲10.16 | |

=== Assembly Election 1962 ===
1962 Maharashtra Legislative Assembly election : Haveli
| Party | Candidate | Votes | % | ±% |
|---|---|---|---|---|
| INC | Martand Dhondiba Magar | 26,927 | 51.09% | ▲31.72 |
| PSP | Ram Dasharath Tupe | 20,124 | 38.18% | ▲6.02 |
| RPI | Bajirao Dashrath Kamble | 3,711 | 7.04% | New |
| ABJS | Pandurang Narayan More | 1,455 | 2.76% | New |
| Independent | Kashinath Mukandrao Chincholikar | 489 | 0.93% | New |
| Margin of victory | | 6,803 | 12.91% | ▲10.07 |
| Turnout | | 55,656 | 65.72% | ▼46.39 |
| Total valid votes | | 52,706 | | |
| Registered electors | | 84,691 | | ▼27.76 |
| INC gain from PSP | | Swing | ▲18.93 | |

=== Assembly Election 1957 ===
1957 Bombay State Legislative Assembly election : Haveli
| Party | Candidate | Votes | % | ±% |
|---|---|---|---|---|
| PSP | Tupe Ram Dashrath | 40,954 | 32.16% | New |
| SCF | Choure Purshottam Martandrao (Sc) | 37,340 | 29.32% | New |
| INC | Martand Dhondiba Magar | 24,668 | 19.37% | New |
| INC | Gadekar Gunabai Ramchandra (Sc) | 24,383 | 19.15% | New |
| Margin of victory | | 3,614 | 2.84% | |
| Turnout | | 1,27,345 | 108.62% | |
| Total valid votes | | 1,27,345 | | |
| Registered electors | | 1,17,237 | | |
| PSP win (new seat) | | | | |

== See also ==
- List of constituencies of Maharashtra Legislative Assembly
