= Manohar Bhoir =

Indian politician

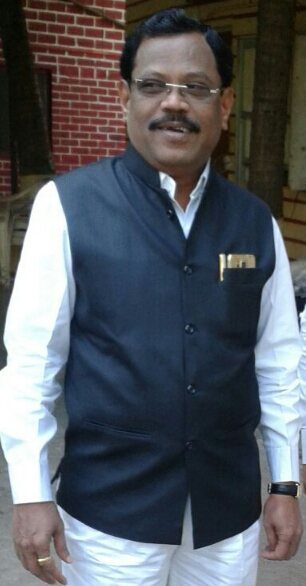

Member of Legislative Assembly of Maharashtra
- In office 2014–2019
- Preceded by: Vivek Patil
- Succeeded by: Mahesh Baldi
- Constituency: Uran

Personal details
- Born: 1 June Juna Sheva
- Party: Shiv Sena

Manohar Bhoir is a Shiv Sena politician from Raigad district in the Indian state of Maharashtra. He is a member of the 13th Maharashtra Legislative Assembly. He represents the Uran Assembly Constituency.

== Career ==
From 2014 to 2019 he worked as an MLA for Uran. He helped Gharapuri island (Elephanta) get electricity. He helped build a jetty at Karanja for the Koli people (fishermen). He is known for being a helping hand for handicapped persons.

During the COVID-19 pandemic he helped people in need by donating food items. He helped create Uran Got Covid-Centre at Bokadvira.

== See also ==
- Maval Lok Sabha constituency
