= Ashwini Jagtap =

Indian politician

Member of Maharashtra Legislative Assembly
- In office 2023–2024
- Preceded by: Laxman Jagtap
- Succeeded by: Shankar Jagtap
- Constituency: Chinchwad

Personal details
- Party: Bharatiya Janata Party
- Spouse: Laxman Jagtap
- Relatives: Shankar Jagtap (Brother-in-law)
- Profession: Politician

Ashwini Laxmanrao Jagtap is an Indian politician and widow of Laxman Pandurang Jagtap who will serve as Member of 14th Maharashtra Legislative Assembly from Chinchwad Assembly constituency. She is first woman MLA from Chinchwad Assembly constituency.

== Personal life ==
She hails from Satara district. She is daughter of a retired police officer. She is widow of Laxman Pandurang Jagtap. She got education up to 10th standard from Huzurpaga.
