= Bala Bhegade =

Indian politician

Minister of State (Labour, Environment, Relief and Rehabilitation, Earthquake Rehabilitation)
- In office 2014 – 21 November 2019
- Succeeded by: Hasan Mushrif
- Constituency: Maval

Member of Legislative Assembly Maharashtra
- In office 2009–2019
- Preceded by: Digambar Bhegde
- Succeeded by: Sunil Shelke
- Constituency: Maval

Personal details
- Born: Sanjay Vishwanath Bhegade
- Party: Independent
- Other party: Bharatiya Janata Party
- Occupation: Farmer and Business

Sanjay Vishwanath alias Bala Bhegade is an Indian politician. He was elected to the Maharashtra Legislative Assembly from Maval, Maharashtra in the 2014 Maharashtra Legislative Assembly election as a member of the Bharatiya Janata Party.

He was sworn in as Minister of State for Labour, Environment, Relief and Rehabilitation, Earthquake Rehabilitation in Devendra Fadnavis cabinet in June 2019.

Bala Bhegde Resigned to Bhartiya Janata party on 24 October 2024.
