= Vivek Patil =

Indian politician

Vivekanand Shankar Patil is a politician of the Peasants and Workers Party of India, and the founder of the Karnala Sports Academy.

Patil represented the Panvel constituency in the Maharashtra Legislative Assembly for three terms. Since Panvel was divided, he has represented the Uran constituency.

He ran in the 2014 Vidhan Sabha elections in Uran but received only 55,320 votes, losing to Manohar Bhoir of the Shiv Sena party. After the election, he threatened to file a public interest lawsuit against a rival politician, Prashant Thakur.

He has been found guilty of money laundering and arrest order is issued to arrest him by Enforcement Directorate of Government of India on 15 June 2021.
