= Shrirang Barne =

Indian politician (born 1964)

Shrirang Barane

Member of Parliament, Lok Sabha
- Incumbent
- Assumed office 16 May 2014
- Preceded by: Gajanan Babar
- Constituency: Maval

Personal details
- Born: 16 February 1964 (age 62) Thergaon, Maharashtra, India
- Party: Shiv Sena
- Other political affiliations: Indian National Congress
- Spouse: Sarita Barne (m. 1990)
- Children: 2
- Website: shrirangappabarne.in

Shrirang Appa Chandu Barne (born 16 February 1964) is an Indian politician belonging to the Shiv Sena. He was a member of the 16th Lok Sabha and re-elected for the 17th and 18th Lok Sabha. He represents the Maval constituency of Maharashtra. In the 2014 Lok Sabha election, he defeated sitting MLA Laxman Pandurang Jagtap who contested from Peasants and Workers Party of India by 157394 votes by obtaining 512223 votes against 354829 and in the 2019 Lok Sabha election, he defeated Parth Ajit Pawar who contested from Nationalist Congress Party by 215913 votes by obtaining 720663 votes against 504750.

He has been awarded with Sansad Ratna Award, Top performers of Indian Parliament in 2015, 2016, 2017, 2018 and 2019. In 2020, he was honoured with 'Sansad Maha Ratna Award' for sustained qualitative performance in the 16th Lok Sabha. This award is presented once in five years.

== Political career ==
- 1999: Elected as Corporator in Pimpri-Chinchwad Municipal Corporation
- 1999: Elected as Chairman of Standing committee Pimpri-Chinchwad Municipal Corporation
- 2002: Re-elected as Corporator in Pimpri-Chinchwad Municipal Corporation
- 2002-05: Leader of Opposition-Pimpri Chinchwad Municipal & Member Pune District Planning Committee
- 2007: Re-elected as Corporator in Pimpri-Chinchwad Municipal Corporation
- 2009: Lost Maharashtra Assembly elections from Chinchwad Vidhan sabha.
- 2009: Re-elected as Corporator in Pimpri-Chinchwad Municipal Corporation
- 2012: Re-elected as Corporator in Pimpri-Chinchwad Municipal Corporation
- 2012: Elected as group leader of Shiv Sena in Pimpri-Chinchwad Municipal Corporation
- 2014: Elected to 16th Lok Sabha
- 1 Sep.2014 onward: Member, Standing Committee on Defense Member, Consultative Committee on Road Transport & Shipping Member, Parliamentary Committee on Official Language
- 2015: Honored with 'Sansad Ratna' Award, for their top performance during the first four sessions of the 16th Lok Sabha.
- 2016: Honoured with 'Sansad Ratna' Award in 7th Edition of Sansad Ratna Award for top performing Parliamentarians of 16th Lok Sabha (up to 7th session).
- 2019: Re- Elected to 17th Lok Sabha.
- 13 Sep.2019 onward: Member :-Standing Committee on Finance, Member:- Consultative Committee on Tourism Culture, Member: -Parliamentary Committee on Official Language (First sub-committee) and सदस्य:- आलेख और साक्ष्य समिति
- 2020 Honoured with 'Sansad Maha Ratna Award' for sustained qualitative performance in the 16th Lok Sabha. This Award is presented once in five years.
- Books Published by Shrirang Barne

(i) Shabdved, (ii) Samrth Ladvaiya, (iii). Apla Vaibhavshali Maval-The Glory of Mave Lok Sabha, (iv). Me Anubhav Leli Sansad- Based on parliamentary experience as being elected to the Lok Sabha for the first time.

- 2024: Re- Elected to 18th Lok Sabha.
