= Gajanan Dharmshi Babar =

Indian politician (1943–2022)

Member of Parliament, Lok Sabha
- In office 2009-2014
- Preceded by: New Seat
- Succeeded by: Shrirang Barne
- Constituency: Maval

Personal details
- Born: 1 March 1943 Malegaon, Satara district, Maharashtra, British Raj
- Died: 2 February 2022 (aged 78) Pune, Maharashtra, India
- Party: Shivsena
- Other political affiliations: Maharashtra Navnirman Sena
- As of 16 September, 2006

Gajanan Dharmshi Babar (1 March 1943 – 2 February 2022) was an Indian politician.

== Biography ==
He was a member of the 15th Lok Sabha. He represented the Maval Lok Sabha constituency in Pune and Raigad District of Maharashtra and was a member of the Shiv Sena political party.

Babar was a member of Standing Committee On Urban Development from 31 August 2009 to 30 August 2011 and Standing Committee on Rural Development. He was also a member of Standing Committee on Chemical & Fertilizer and Consultative Committee for the Ministry of Defence, and a member of the Parliamentary Committee on Official Language (First Sub-Committee).

In January 2016, he joined Bharatiya Janata Party in the presence of Chief Minister of Maharashtra Devendra Fadnavis and Pune district guardian minister Girish Bapat.

He died from COVID-19 in Pune on 2 February 2022, at the age of 78.
