= Mahesh Baldi =

Indian politician

Member of Legislative Assembly Maharashtra
- Incumbent
- Assumed office 21 October 2019
- Preceded by: Manohar Bhoir, SS
- Constituency: Uran

Personal details
- Party: Bhartiya Janata Party

Mahesh Baldi is an Indian politician. He is elected to the Maharashtra Legislative Assembly from Uran, Maharashtra in the 2019 Maharashtra Legislative Assembly election. He contested the election as an independent candidate and announced his support of Bharatiya Janata Party. He is originally from Rajasthan. His village name is Rid in Nagaur District.
