= Maruti Bhapkar =

Indian politician

- Born: 2 June 1970 (age 56)
- Known for: Exposed Sharad Pawar family involvement in Lavasa scam. Indian anti-corruption movement – 2011; Indian anti-corruption movement – 2012
- Political party: Shiv Sena
- Website: www.marutibhapkar.org

Maruti Bhapkar is an Indian politician who belongs to the Shiv Sena party. He is a former founder member and convenor of Pune District for the Aam Aadmi Party. He is a social and IAC activist in Pimpri Chinchwad and Pune. He was a corporator at the Pimpri Chinchwad Municipal Corporation from 2007 to 2012. He fought the 2009 Lok Sabha election from Maval as an independent candidate.

== Jan Lokpal Andolan ==
Maruti Bhapkar has been associated with Anna Hazare and Arvind Kejriwal in the Jan Lokpal Andolan since the first day. He plays a significant role in Andolan-related activities in Pune and Pimpri Chinchwad. He participated in the Jail Bharo Andolan following Anna-ji's call. He introduced a proposal supporting the Jan Lokpal Andolan in PCMC's general body meeting and it was passed with a majority.

== Experimentation and implementation of Swaraj model ==
In his capacity as the Pimpri Chinchwad Municipal Corporation corporator from 2007 to 2012, Maruti Bhapkar successfully implemented the Swaraj model in his ward. Every 3 months, a Jan Sabha was held in the ward to engage public consultations on various issues such as roads, parks, cultural center, slum rehabilitation, electricity and police. He implemented public proposals that went against his personal opinion.

== Anti-corruption work ==
- Since its establishment in 1982, the Pimpri Chinchwad Municipal Corporation was not audited until Maruti's intervention in 2000. He filed a PIL in the Bombay High Court, following which an audit was conducted. The audit exposed Rs. 4 billion worth of irregularities.
- Bhapkar's agitation demanding action against irregularities in the MIDC land allocation to the NCP's Ajit Pawar's aide resulted in a Rs. 7.2 million fine on NCP MLA Vilas Lande.
- Using RTI, Maruti Bhapkar exposed the Pawar family involvement in Lavasa scam.

== 2009 Lok Sabha Election ==
Maruti Bhapkar fought the 2009 Lok Sabha election. His main election plank was farmers' displacement because of the Special Economic Zones (SEZs) in Raigad and Pune districts. Though he received wide support from civil society leaders including Justice Sachar, Medha Patkar, Aruna Roy and Arvind Kejriwal, he lost the election to the Shiv Sena's Gajanan Babar.
