= Sunil Shelke =

Indian politician

Sunil (Anna) Shelke

Member of the Maharashtra Legislative Assembly
- Incumbent
- Assumed office 21 October 2019
- Preceded by: Bala Bhegade
- Constituency: Maval

Personal details
- Born: 20 October 1980 (age 45) Maval, Pune, Maharashtra
- Citizenship: India
- Party: Nationalist Congress Party
- Spouse: Sarika Shelke
- Children: Sai Shraddha
- Parent: Shankarrao Shelke (father)
- Education: Matriculation
- Profession: Farmer and Businessperson

Sunil Shankarrao Shelke is an Indian politician. He is elected to the Maharashtra Legislative Assembly from Maval, Maharashtra in the 2019 Maharashtra Legislative Assembly election as a member of the Nationalist Congress Party.
