= Anna Bansode =

Indian politician (born 1978)

Anna Dadu Bansode
- अण्णा बनसोडे

19th Deputy Speaker of the Maharashtra Legislative Assembly
- Incumbent
- Assumed office 25 March 2025
- Governor: Acharya Devvrat; Jishnu Dev Varma
- Speaker: Rahul Narwekar
- Preceded by: Narhari Sitaram Zirwal

Member of Maharashtra Legislative Assembly
- Incumbent
- Assumed office 11 November 2019
- Preceded by: Gautam Chabukswar
- Constituency: Pimpri
- In office 2009–2014
- Preceded by: Constituency established
- Succeeded by: Gautam Chabukswar
- Constituency: Pimpri

Personal details
- Born: 1978 (age 48) Chinchwad, Maharashtra, India
- Party: Nationalist Congress Party
- Education: University of Pune
- Occupation: Politician
- Website: on Facebook

Anna Dadu Bansode (born 1978) is an Indian politician from Maharashtra. He is currently serving as the Deputy Speaker of Maharashtra Legislative Assembly. He has been a Member of Legislative Assembly of Maharashtra since 24 October 2019 from Pimpri. Previously he was elected by Pimpri in 2009. He got a ticket for 4 th time from pimpri Assembly to contest against Sulekha Shilawant of NCP-SP in 2024 vidhan Sabha elections.
