= Prashant Thakur =

Indian politician

Member of Legislative Assembly Maharashtra
- Incumbent
- Assumed office 21 October 2009
- Preceded by: Vivek Patil
- Constituency: Panvel

Personal details
- Party: Bhartiya Janata Party
- Other political affiliations: PWP; Indian National Congress
- Spouse: Varsha Thakur
- Children: 2

Prashant Thakur is an Indian politician from Maharashtra. He is a member of the Bharatiya Janata Party.

== Early life ==
Thakur was born in Panvel on 5 August 1974, son of Ramsheth Changu Thakur and Shakuntala Thakur. Ramsheth Thakur is a former Member of Parliament (MP). Thakur started studying civil engineering but left after his second year.

He married Varsha Thakur and raised 2 children.

== Political career ==
Thakur was elected to the Maharashtra Legislative Assembly from Panvel, Maharashtra in the 2009 Maharashtra Legislative Assembly election as a candidate from the Indian National Congress Party.

He served as Chairman of CIDCO, a politician in Panvel contested the 2014 Maharashtra Elections.

Thakur became President of the Raigad District Youth Congress Committee in 2005. He then became the President of the Panvel Municipal Corporation in 2006 and served until 2009.

Thakur is a member of the board of directors at Janardan Bhagat Shikshan Prasarak Sanstha in Panvel. He is the managing director at Shahu Institute of Information Technology Pvt. Ltd.

He serves as managing director of the Shahu Institute of Information Technology and the Director of Malhar Network - the core entity which organizes the popular Malhar Mahotsav at CKT College, Panvel.

Time Period	Position	Government Body	Political Party
2006	President	Panvel Municipal Council	INC(UPA)
2009	MLA	Maharashtra Legislature	INC(UPA)
2014	MLA	Maharashtra Legislature	BJP(NDA)
2019	MLA	Maharashtra Legislature	BJP(NDA)
2024	MLA	Maharashtra Legislature	BJP(Maha Yuti)

== Controversies ==
Thakur changed parties during his career. He first joined the PWP party. He then joined Congress party and then joined BJP. Former Uran MLA Vivek Patil warned Thakur to file PIL against him. He said "Thakur had used unfair means to acquire land for sports complex in Ulwe". The Shiv Sena-led Maharashtra government removed Thakur as chairman of CIDCO, which was building the Navi Mumbai international airport with a private player.

== See also ==
- Panvel (Vidhan Sabha constituency)
- Maharashtra Legislative Assembly
