= Maval Assembly constituency =

Constituency of the Maharashtra legislative assembly in India

Coordinates: 18.90°N 73.37°E

Maval
- Constituency No. 204 for the Maharashtra Legislative Assembly

Constituency details
- Country: India
- Region: Western India
- State: Maharashtra
- District: Pune
- Lok Sabha constituency: Maval
- Established: 1952
- Total electors: 386,301
- Reservation: None

Member of Legislative Assembly
- 15th Maharashtra Legislative Assembly
- Incumbent Sunil Shelke
- Party: NCP
- Alliance: NDA
- Elected year: 2024

Maval Assembly constituency is one of the 288 constituencies of the Maharashtra Vidhan Sabha and 21 located in Pune district.

It is a part of Maval Lok Sabha constituency along with five other assembly constituencies: Pimpri and Chinchwad from Pune district and Karjat, Uran and Panvel from Raigad district.

== Members of the Legislative Assembly ==
Year	Member	Party
Maval North Mulshi
1952	Veedharval Dabhade	Independent
Maval
1957	Rambhau Mhalgi	Bharatiya Jana Sangh
1962	Namdeo Mohol	Indian National Congress
1967	Raghunath Satkar	Indian National Congress
1972	Krishnarao Bhegade	Bharatiya Jana Sangh
1978	Krishnarao Bhegade	Indian National Congress
1980	B. S. Gade Patil	Indian National Congress (I)
1985	Madanlal Bafna	Indian National Congress
1990	Madanlal Bafna	Indian National Congress
1995	Ruplekha Dhore	Bharatiya Janata Party
1999	Digambar Bhegde	Bharatiya Janata Party
2004	Digambar Bhegde	Bharatiya Janata Party
2009	Bala Bhegade	Bharatiya Janata Party
2014	Bala Bhegade	Bharatiya Janata Party
2019	Sunil Shelke	Nationalist Congress Party
2024	Sunil Shelke	Nationalist Congress Party

== Election results ==
=== Assembly Election 2024 ===
2024 Maharashtra Legislative Assembly election : Maval
Party	Candidate	Votes	%	±%
NCP	Sunil Shelke	191,255	69.20%	New
Independent	Anna Alias Bapu Jaywantrao Bhegade	82,690	29.92%	New
NOTA	None of the Above	2,715	0.98%	▲0.38
Margin of victory		108,565	39.28%	▲1.21
Turnout		279,081	72.24%	▲0.76
Total valid votes		276,366		
Registered electors		386,301		▲10.82
NCP hold		Swing	▲1.23	

=== Assembly Election 2019 ===
2019 Maharashtra Legislative Assembly election : Maval
Party	Candidate	Votes	%	±%
NCP	Sunil Shelke	167,712	67.97%	▲35.34
BJP	Bala Vishwanath Bhegade	73,770	29.90%	▼16.31
VBA	Ramesh Ananda Ovhal	2,728	1.11%	New
NOTA	None of the Above	1,490	0.60%	▼0.37
Margin of victory		93,942	38.07%	▲24.50
Turnout		248,358	71.25%	▲0.36
Total valid votes		246,734		
Registered electors		348,581		▲19.01
NCP gain from BJP		Swing	▲21.76	

=== Assembly Election 2014 ===
2014 Maharashtra Legislative Assembly election : Maval
Party	Candidate	Votes	%	±%
BJP	Bala Vishwanath Bhegade	95,319	46.21%	▲0.91
NCP	Dnyanoba Alias Mauli Dabhade	67,318	32.64%	▼4.86
INC	Kiran Shankar Gaikwad	17,624	8.54%	New
SS	Macchindra Babanrao Kharade	17,385	8.43%	New
MNS	Mangesh Dnyaneshwar Walunj	3,792	1.84%	▼2.78
NOTA	None of the Above	2,006	0.97%	New
BSP	Bhalerao Pramod Eknath	1,955	0.95%	▼0.45
Margin of victory		28,001	13.57%	▲5.78
Turnout		208,549	71.20%	▲5.04
Total valid votes		206,274		
Registered electors		292,898		▲4.33
BJP hold		Swing	▲0.91	

=== Assembly Election 2009 ===
2009 Maharashtra Legislative Assembly election : Maval
Party	Candidate	Votes	%	±%
BJP	Bala Vishwanath Bhegade	83,158	45.30%	▲11.57
NCP	Bapu Jaywantrao Bhegade	68,840	37.50%	▲6.02
RPI(A)	Ramesh Ramchandra Salve	15,160	8.26%	New
MNS	Raju Namdev Pinjan	8,472	4.62%	New
BSP	Kalokhe Dnyanoba Kisan	2,559	1.39%	▼0.40
Independent	Prakashdada Jain	2,100	1.14%	New
BBM	Adv. Navnath Kundlik Gade	1,356	0.74%	New
Margin of victory		14,318	7.80%	▲5.55
Turnout		183,632	65.41%	▼1.08
Total valid votes		183,574		
Registered electors		280,748		▲26.87
BJP hold		Swing	▲11.57	

=== Assembly Election 2004 ===
2004 Maharashtra Legislative Assembly election : Maval
Party	Candidate	Votes	%	±%
BJP	Bhegde Digambar Baloba	49,612	33.73%	▼9.36
NCP	Bafna Madanlal Harakchand	46,300	31.48%	▲3.29
Independent	Dabhade Dnyanoba Savlaram	40,219	27.34%	New
PWPI	More Bharat Dagdu	3,456	2.35%	New
Independent	Bansode Tukaram Vamanrao	3,300	2.24%	New
BSP	Tukaram Appa Ransingh	2,639	1.79%	New
LJP	Bharatlal Mithailal Pardeshi	1,563	1.06%	New
Margin of victory		3,312	2.25%	▼12.65
Turnout		147,105	66.48%	▲8.15
Total valid votes		147,089		
Registered electors		221,286		▲18.39
BJP hold		Swing	▼9.36	

=== Assembly Election 1999 ===
1999 Maharashtra Legislative Assembly election : Maval
Party	Candidate	Votes	%	±%
BJP	Bhegde Digambar Baloba	46,970	43.09%	▼9.99
NCP	Bhegade Krishnarao Dhondiaba	30,725	28.18%	New
INC	Satkar Chandrakant Appaso	29,628	27.18%	▼10.63
Margin of victory		16,245	14.90%	▼0.36
Turnout		115,898	62.01%	▼18.02
Total valid votes		109,014		
Registered electors		186,913		▲6.00
BJP hold		Swing	▼9.99	

=== Assembly Election 1995 ===
1995 Maharashtra Legislative Assembly election : Maval
Party	Candidate	Votes	%	±%
BJP	Dhore Ruplekha Khanderao	71,452	53.07%	▲16.54
INC	Bafna Madanlal Harakchand	50,900	37.81%	▼3.72
JD	Mhalaskar Sopan Baburao	3,382	2.51%	▼1.44
Independent	More Bharat Dagadu	2,839	2.11%	New
Independent	Awale Sambhaji Gundu	2,377	1.77%	New
Independent	Unkule Anil Ramchandra	2,152	1.60%	New
Doordarshi Party	Kadam Pandurang Ganpat	960	0.71%	New
Margin of victory		20,552	15.27%	▲10.27
Turnout		138,785	78.70%	▲11.35
Total valid votes		134,627		
Registered electors		176,340		▲4.68
BJP gain from INC		Swing	▲11.54	

=== Assembly Election 1990 ===
1990 Maharashtra Legislative Assembly election : Maval
Party	Candidate	Votes	%	±%
INC	Bafna Madanlal Harakchand	45,469	41.53%	▼6.23
BJP	Bhegde Vishwanath Rambhau	40,004	36.54%	▼2.25
Independent	Satkar Chandrakant Appaji	17,881	16.33%	New
JD	Shinde Sadashiv Ganpat	4,323	3.95%	New
Independent	Gaikwad Tryambak Ganpat	1,369	1.25%	New
Margin of victory		5,465	4.99%	▼3.98
Turnout		111,642	66.27%	▲3.59
Total valid votes		109,486		
Registered electors		168,461		▲33.41
INC hold		Swing	▼6.23	

=== Assembly Election 1985 ===
1985 Maharashtra Legislative Assembly election : Maval
Party	Candidate	Votes	%	±%
INC	Bafna Madanlal Harakchand	37,028	47.76%	New
BJP	Bhegde Vishwanath Rambhau	30,071	38.79%	▲16.73
Independent	Shetty Umesh Ramchandra	4,948	6.38%	New
Independent	Jadhav Shashikant Bhimrao	3,138	4.05%	New
Independent	Jadhav Murlidhar Maruti	1,542	1.99%	New
Margin of victory		6,957	8.97%	▲6.49
Turnout		79,409	62.89%	▲6.87
Total valid votes		77,526		
Registered electors		126,269		▲11.69
INC gain from INC(I)		Swing	▲10.40	

=== Assembly Election 1980 ===
1980 Maharashtra Legislative Assembly election : Maval
Party	Candidate	Votes	%	±%
INC(I)	Gade Patil B. S.	23,032	37.36%	New
INC(U)	Krishnarao Bhegade	21,500	34.88%	New
BJP	Vishwanth Bhegade	13,599	22.06%	New
Independent	Raj Salve	3,217	5.22%	New
Margin of victory		1,532	2.49%	▼10.57
Turnout		63,243	55.94%	▼14.76
Total valid votes		61,642		
Registered electors		113,057		▲9.59
INC(I) gain from INC		Swing	▼16.52	

=== Assembly Election 1978 ===
1978 Maharashtra Legislative Assembly election : Maval
Party	Candidate	Votes	%	±%
INC	Bhegade Krishnarao Dhondiaba	38,514	53.89%	▲10.95
JP	Bhegade Nathubhau Baburao	29,181	40.83%	New
Independent	Jadhav Shashikant Bhimrao	3,777	5.28%	New
Margin of victory		9,333	13.06%	▲6.58
Turnout		74,133	71.86%	▲2.21
Total valid votes		71,472		
Registered electors		103,165		▲23.29
INC gain from ABJS		Swing	▲4.47	

=== Assembly Election 1972 ===
1972 Maharashtra Legislative Assembly election : Maval
Party	Candidate	Votes	%	±%
ABJS	Bhegade Krishnarao Dhondiaba	27,730	49.41%	▲7.56
INC	Satkar Raghunath Shankar	24,094	42.93%	▲0.08
RPI(K)	Gaikwad T. Ganpat	2,496	4.45%	New
RPI	Shaikh Ismail Ibrahim	1,799	3.21%	▼3.9
Margin of victory		3,636	6.48%	▲5.47
Turnout		58,373	69.76%	▲2.08
Total valid votes		56,119		
Registered electors		83,676		▲19.36
ABJS gain from INC		Swing	▲6.56	

=== Assembly Election 1967 ===
1967 Maharashtra Legislative Assembly election : Maval
Party	Candidate	Votes	%	±%
INC	Raghunath Satkar	19,525	42.86%	▼13.92
ABJS	K. D. Bhegade	19,066	41.85%	▲11.86
RPI	D. L. Gaikwad	3,239	7.11%	New
PSP	G. R. Tkale	2,207	4.84%	▼0.68
Independent	Y. S. Gaikwad	1,168	2.56%	New
Margin of victory		459	1.01%	▼25.78
Turnout		48,958	69.84%	▲4.77
Total valid votes		45,558		
Registered electors		70,105		▼8.68
INC hold		Swing	▼13.92	

=== Assembly Election 1962 ===
1962 Maharashtra Legislative Assembly election : Maval
Party	Candidate	Votes	%	±%
INC	Namdeo Sadashiv Mohol	26,247	56.78%	▲22.88
ABJS	Nathu Baburao Bhegade	13,862	29.99%	▼26.48
CPI	Subhan Jayarani Vaidya	3,564	7.71%	New
PSP	Moreshwar Gopal Baware	2,555	5.53%	New
Margin of victory		12,385	26.79%	▲4.22
Turnout		49,515	64.50%	▲12.11
Total valid votes		46,228		
Registered electors		76,771		▲20.85
INC gain from ABJS		Swing	▲0.31	

=== Assembly Election 1957 ===
1957 Bombay State Legislative Assembly election : Maval
Party	Candidate	Votes	%	±%
ABJS	Rambhau Mhalgi	17,258	56.47%	New
INC	Chitale Sharadabai Ganesh	10,360	33.90%	▲8.08
Independent	Khalade Dattatraya Laxman	1,553	5.08%	New
Independent	Moghe Rajaram Narayan	1,392	4.55%	New
Margin of victory		6,898	22.57%	▼6.20
Turnout		30,563	48.11%	▲0.25
Total valid votes		30,563		
Registered electors		63,527		▲7.72
ABJS gain from Independent		Swing	▲1.88	

=== Assembly Election 1952 ===
1952 Bombay State Legislative Assembly election : Maval North Mulshi
Party	Candidate	Votes	%	±%
Independent	Dabhade Veedharval Yeshwantrao	15,407	54.59%	New
INC	Gupe Gajanan Maheshwar	7,288	25.82%	New
SP	Baware Moreshwar Gopal	3,726	13.20%	New
PWPI	Soman Moreshwar Chintaman	904	3.20%	New
Independent	Dhamale Shankarrao Vithalrao	899	3.19%	New
Margin of victory		8,119	28.77%	
Turnout		28,224	47.86%	
Total valid votes		28,224		
Registered electors		58,972		
Independent win (new seat)				

== See also ==
- Maval
