= Pimpri Assembly constituency =

Constituency of the Maharashtra legislative assembly in India

Coordinates: 18.63°N 73.81°E

Pimpri
- Constituency No. 206 for the Maharashtra Legislative Assembly

Constituency details
- Country: India
- Region: Western India
- State: Maharashtra
- District: Pune
- Lok Sabha constituency: Maval
- Established: 2008
- Total electors: 391,739
- Reservation: SC

Member of Legislative Assembly
- 15th Maharashtra Legislative Assembly
- Incumbent Anna Bansode
- Party: NCP
- Alliance: NDA
- Elected year: 2019

Pimpri Assembly constituency is one of the twenty one constituencies of Maharashtra Vidhan Sabha located in the city of Pune, India.

It is a part of the Maval Lok Sabha constituency along with five other assembly constituencies: Chinchwad and Maval from Pune district and Karjat, Uran and Panvel from Raigad district. As of 2019, its representative is Anna Bansode of the Nationalist Congress Party.

== Members of the Legislative Assembly ==
Year	Member	Party
Until 2008: Constituency did not exist
2009	Anna Bansode	Nationalist Congress Party
2014	Gautam Chabukswar	Shiv Sena
2019	Anna Bansode	Nationalist Congress Party
2024	Anna Bansode	Nationalist Congress Party

== Election results ==
Vote share of winning candidates
2024	54.79%
2019	49.89%
2014	29.63%
2009	41.69%

=== Assembly Election 2024 ===
2024 Maharashtra Legislative Assembly election : Pimpri
Party	Candidate	Votes	%	±%
NCP	Anna Dadu Bansode	109,239	54.79%	New
NCP-SP	Dr. Sulakshana Shilwant-Dhar	72,575	36.40%	New
VBA	Manoj Bhaskar Garbade	7,173	3.60%	▼4.25
NOTA	None of the Above	4,013	2.01%	▲0.15
BSP	Sundar Mhasukant Kamble	1,836	0.92%	▲0.23
Margin of victory		36,664	18.39%	▲7.03
Turnout		203,403	51.92%	▲1.60
Total valid votes		199,390		
Registered electors		391,739		▲10.76
NCP hold		Swing	▲4.90	

=== Assembly Election 2019 ===
2019 Maharashtra Legislative Assembly election : Pimpri
Party	Candidate	Votes	%	±%
NCP	Anna Dadu Bansode	86,985	49.89%	▲21.62
SS	Adv. Gautam Chabukswar	67,177	38.53%	▲8.90
VBA	Pravin Allias Balasaheb Gaikwad	13,681	7.85%	New
NOTA	None of the Above	3,246	1.86%	▼0.71
BSP	Dhanraj Govind Gaikwad	1,213	0.70%	▼1.09
Margin of victory		19,808	11.36%	▲10.01
Turnout		177,649	50.23%	▲4.23
Total valid votes		174,349		
Registered electors		353,688		▼7.59
NCP gain from SS		Swing	▲20.26	

=== Assembly Election 2014 ===
2014 Maharashtra Legislative Assembly election : Pimpri
Party	Candidate	Votes	%	±%
SS	Adv. Gautam Chabukswar	51,096	29.63%	New
NCP	Anna Dadu Bansode	48,761	28.27%	▼13.42
RPI(A)	Chandrakanta Laxman Sonkamble	47,288	27.42%	▲19.81
INC	Manoj Vishnu Kamble	11,022	6.39%	New
MNS	Anita Dattatraya Sonawane	5,169	3.00%	New
NOTA	None of the Above	4,435	2.57%	New
BSP	Adv. Kshitij Texas Gaikwad	3,075	1.78%	▼1.01
Margin of victory		2,335	1.35%	▼5.15
Turnout		176,933	46.23%	▲2.55
Total valid votes		172,467		
Registered electors		382,718		▲11.10
SS gain from NCP		Swing	▼12.06	

=== Assembly Election 2009 ===
2009 Maharashtra Legislative Assembly election : Pimpri
Party	Candidate	Votes	%	±%
NCP	Anna Dadu Bansode	61,061	41.69%	New
BJP	Amar Shankar Sable	51,534	35.19%	New
RPI(A)	Chandrakanta Laxman Sonkamble	11,146	7.61%	New
JD(S)	Manao Shripati Kamble	8,247	5.63%	New
BSP	Rajendra Kundlik Gaikwad	4,088	2.79%	New
Independent	Harshvardhan Madhukar Meshram	3,430	2.34%	New
Independent	Sanjay Narayan Jagtap	1,155	0.79%	New
Margin of victory		9,527	6.50%	
Turnout		146,481	42.52%	
Total valid votes		146,461		
Registered electors		344,485		
NCP win (new seat)				
