= Chinchwad Assembly constituency =

Constituency of the Maharashtra legislative assembly in India

Coordinates: 18.63°N 73.78°E

Chinchwad
- Constituency No. 205 for the Maharashtra Legislative Assembly

Constituency details
- Country: India
- Region: Western India
- State: Maharashtra
- District: Pune
- Lok Sabha constituency: Maval
- Established: 2008
- Total electors: 663,788
- Reservation: None

Member of Legislative Assembly
- 15th Maharashtra Legislative Assembly
- Incumbent Shankar Jagtap
- Party: BJP
- Alliance: NDA
- Elected year: 2024

Chinchwad Assembly constituency is one of the twenty one constituencies of the Maharashtra Vidhan Sabha located in the city of Pune, India.

It is a part of the Maval (Lok Sabha constituency) along with five other assembly constituencies: Pimpri and Maval from the Pune District and Karjat, Uran and Panvel from the Raigad district.

The last Legislator representing this constituency was Laxman Pandurang Jagtap, who won as an independent in 2009 and as a BJP candidate in 2014 Vidhan Sabha elections. The by-election was conducted due to the death of the incumbent MLA.

== Members of the Legislative Assembly ==
| Year | Member | Party |
|---|---|---|
Until 2008: Constituency did not exist
| 2009 | Laxman Jagtap | Independent |
| 2014 | Laxman Jagtap | Bharatiya Janata Party |
| 2019 | Laxman Jagtap | Bharatiya Janata Party |
| 2023^ | Ashwini Jagtap | Bharatiya Janata Party |
| 2024 | Shankar Jagtap | Bharatiya Janata Party |

By-elections denoted by^

== Areas ==
1. Rahatani
2. Pimple Saudagar
3. Wakad
4. Thergaon
5. Tathawade
6. Walhekarwadi
7. Punawale
8. Ravet
9. Samawishata Kiwale Mamurdi
10. Kalewadi
11. Pimple Gurav
12. Aundh Camp
13. Sangvi
14. Dapodi
15. Pimple Nilakh
16. Chinchwad

== Election results ==
=== Assembly Election 2024 ===
2024 Maharashtra Legislative Assembly election : Chinchwad
| Party | Candidate | Votes | % | ±% |
|---|---|---|---|---|
| BJP | Shankar Jagtap | 235,323 | 61.19% | ▲13.51 |
| NCP-SP | Rahul Tanaji Kalate | 131,458 | 34.18% | New |
| Independent | Bhausaheb Sopanrao Bhoir | 4,323 | 1.12% | ▼33.84 |
| NOTA | None of the Above | 4,316 | 1.12% | ▲0.16 |
| AIMIM | Karan Nanasaheb Gade | 3,288 | 0.85% | New |
| SS | Ravindra Vinayak Pardhe (Sir) | 2,680 | 0.70% | New |
| Margin of victory | | 103,865 | 27.01% | ▲14.29 |
| Turnout | | 388,884 | 58.59% | ▲7.96 |
| Total valid votes | | 384,568 | | |
| Registered electors | | 663,788 | | ▲16.63 |
| BJP hold | | Swing | ▲13.51 | |

=== Assembly By-election 2023 ===
2023 Maharashtra Legislative Assembly by-election : Chinchwad
| Party | Candidate | Votes | % | ±% |
|---|---|---|---|---|
| BJP | Ashwini Jagtap | 135,603 | 47.68% | ▼7.66 |
| NCP | Vitthal Alias Nana Krushnaji Kate | 99,435 | 34.96% | ▼6.25 |
| INC | Rahul Tanaji Kalate | 44,112 | 15.51% | New |
| NOTA | None of the Above | 2,731 | 0.96% | ▼1.20 |
| Margin of victory | | 36,168 | 12.72% | ▼1.42 |
| Turnout | | 287,479 | 50.51% | ▼2.56 |
| Total valid votes | | 284,397 | | |
| Registered electors | | 569,122 | | ▲9.77 |
| BJP hold | | Swing | ▼7.66 | |

=== Assembly Election 2019 ===
2019 Maharashtra Legislative Assembly election : Chinchwad
| Party | Candidate | Votes | % | ±% |
|---|---|---|---|---|
| BJP | Laxman Pandurang Jagtap | 150,723 | 55.34% | ▲9.38 |
| NCP | Rahul Tanaji Kalate | 112,225 | 41.21% | New |
| NOTA | None of the Above | 5,874 | 2.16% | ▲0.97 |
| BSP | Rajendra Manik Londhe | 3,954 | 1.45% | ▲0.08 |
| Margin of victory | | 38,498 | 14.14% | ▼8.25 |
| Turnout | | 278,374 | 53.69% | ▼3.08 |
| Total valid votes | | 272,357 | | |
| Registered electors | | 518,480 | | ▲7.04 |
| BJP hold | | Swing | ▲9.38 | |

=== Assembly Election 2014 ===
2014 Maharashtra Legislative Assembly election : Chinchwad
| Party | Candidate | Votes | % | ±% |
|---|---|---|---|---|
| BJP | Laxman Pandurang Jagtap | 123,786 | 45.96% | New |
| SS | Rahul Tanaji Kalate | 63,489 | 23.57% | ▼12.89 |
| NCP | Vitthal Alias Nana Krushnaji Kate | 42,553 | 15.80% | New |
| Independent | Moreshwar Mahadu Bhondve | 13,952 | 5.18% | New |
| INC | Kailash Mahadev Kadam | 8,643 | 3.21% | ▼9.26 |
| MNS | Anant Subhash Korhale | 8,217 | 3.05% | New |
| BSP | Satyavan Kalu Kadam | 3,703 | 1.37% | ▲0.00 |
| NOTA | None of the Above | 3,203 | 1.19% | New |
| Margin of victory | | 60,297 | 22.39% | ▲19.06 |
| Turnout | | 272,705 | 56.30% | ▲5.10 |
| Total valid votes | | 269,354 | | |
| Registered electors | | 484,362 | | ▲23.61 |
| BJP gain from Independent | | Swing | ▲6.17 | |

=== Assembly Election 2009 ===
2009 Maharashtra Legislative Assembly election : Chinchwad
| Party | Candidate | Votes | % | ±% |
|---|---|---|---|---|
| Independent | Laxman Pandurang Jagtap | 78,741 | 39.78% | New |
| SS | Shrirang Appa Barne | 72,166 | 36.46% | New |
| INC | Bhausaheb Sopanrao Bhoir | 24,684 | 12.47% | New |
| Independent | Nandgude Vilasrao Eknath | 15,561 | 7.86% | New |
| BSP | Vijay Nivrutti Waghmare | 2,714 | 1.37% | New |
| Margin of victory | | 6,575 | 3.32% | |
| Turnout | | 198,021 | 50.53% | |
| Total valid votes | | 197,928 | | |
| Registered electors | | 391,857 | | |
| Independent win (new seat) | | | | |

== See also ==
- Maval
- List of constituencies of Maharashtra Legislative Assembly
