= Shankar Jagtap =

Indian politician

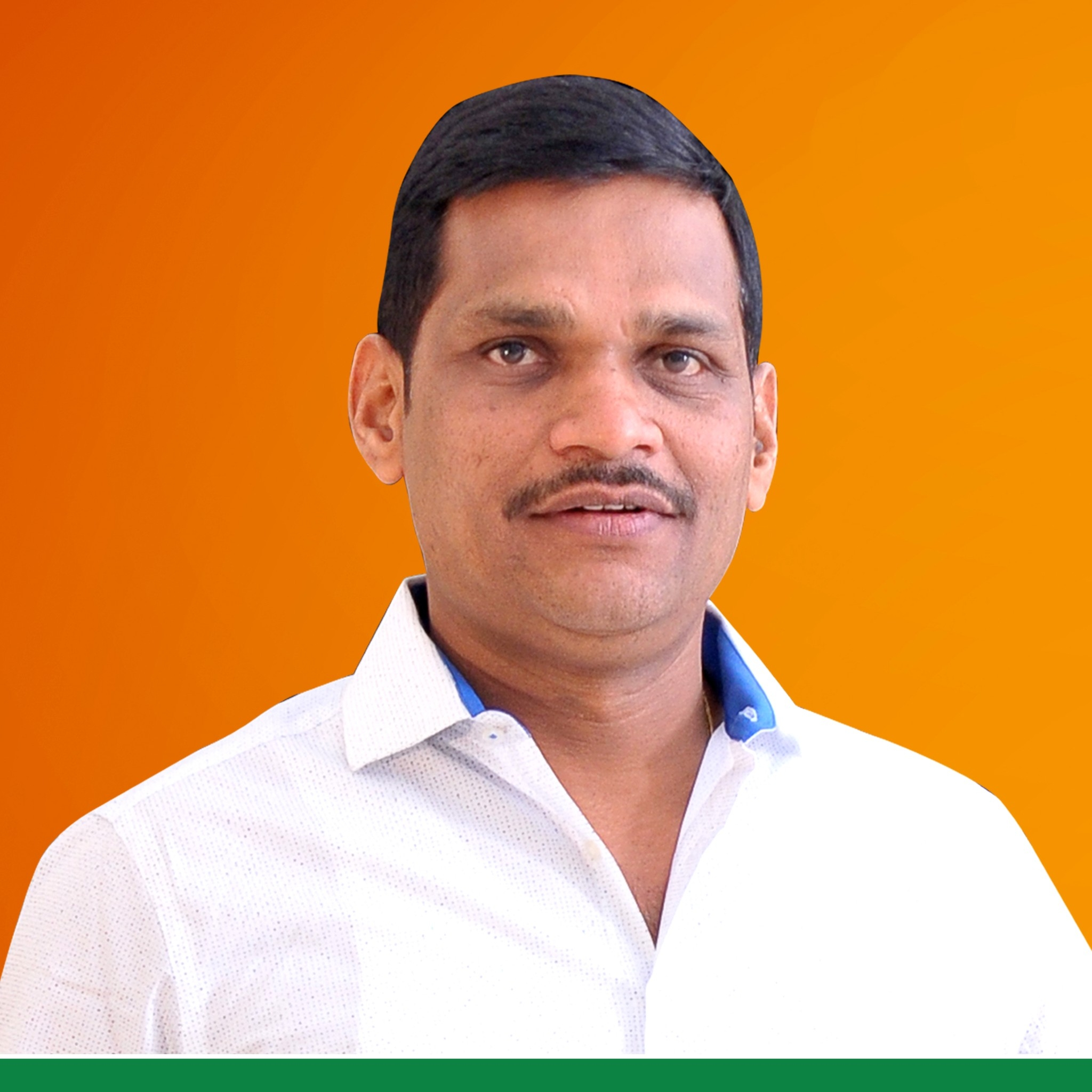

Member of the Maharashtra Legislative Assembly
- Incumbent
- Assumed office 2024
- Preceded by: Shankar Jagtap
- Constituency: Chinchwad

Personal details
- Party: Bharatiya Janata Party
- Profession: Politician

Shankar Pandurang Jagtap is an Indian politician from Maharashtra. He is a member of the Maharashtra Legislative Assembly from 2024, representing Chinchwad Assembly constituency as a member of the Bharatiya Janata Party.

== See also ==
- List of chief ministers of Maharashtra
- Maharashtra Legislative Assembly
