= Laxman Pandurang Jagtap =

Indian politician (1963–2023)

Member of Maharashtra Legislative Assembly
- In office 2009 – 3 January 2023
- Preceded by: constituency created
- Succeeded by: Ashwini Jagtap
- Constituency: Chinchwad

Member of Maharashtra Legislative Council
- In office 2004–2009
- Preceded by: Chandukaka Jagtap
- Constituency: Pune Local Authorities

Personal details
- Born: 15 February 1963
- Died: 3 January 2023 (aged 59) Baner, Pune, Maharashtra, India
- Party: Bharatiya Janata Party
- Other political affiliations: Peasants and Workers Party of India; Independent
- Spouse: Ashwini Jagtap
- Parent: Pandurang Jagtap (father)
- Education: Master of Science

Laxman Pandurang Jagtap (Marathi: लक्ष्मण पांडुरंग जगताप; 15 February 1963 – 3 January 2023) was an Indian politician from Chinchwad in the city of Pune. He was elected as a member of the Maharashtra Legislative Assembly from Chinchwad for 2009 – 2014 as an independent candidate. He was the M.L.A. of Chinchwad.

Jagtap contested the 2014 Lok Sabha elections from Maval constituency as a Peasants and Workers Party of India candidate. He contested again for the same assembly constituency in 2014 but as BJP candidate instead. He was a member of the legislative assembly.

Jagtap died in Baner on 3 January 2023, at the age of 59.

Elections for the Chinchwad Assembly constituency took place after Laxman Jagtap's demise. His wife Ashwini Jagtap defeated the NCP candidate to win the seat on the BJP ticket.
