= 15th Maharashtra Assembly =

Maharashtra Assembly session since 2024

| ← | 14th Assembly |
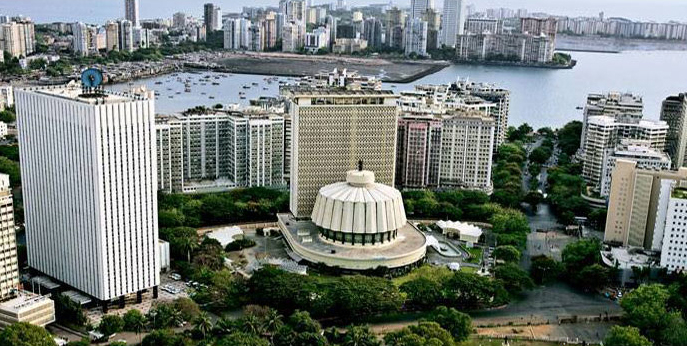
- Maharashtra Vidhan Sabha Mumbai

Overview
- Legislative body: Maharashtra Legislative Assembly
- Term: 7 December 2024 –
- Election: 2024 Maharashtra Legislative Assembly election
- Government: Third Fadnavis ministry (Since 2024)
- Opposition: Vacant (Note: No leader of opposition because no political party obtained at least 10% of the seats in the assembly.)

Sovereign
- Governor: C.P. Radhakrishnan (2024-2025); Acharya Devvrat (since 2025)
- Party control: Maha Yuti
- Speaker of the House: Rahul Narwekar
- Deputy Speaker of the House: Anna Bansode
- Chief Minister: Devendra Fadnavis
- Deputy Chief Minister: Eknath Shinde; Ajit Pawar (2024-2026); Sunetra Pawar (From 2026)
- Leader of the House: Devendra Fadnavis

The Members of 15th Maharashtra Legislative Assembly were elected in the 2024 Maharashtra Legislative Assembly election, with results announced on 23 November 2024.

The Bharatiya Janata Party emerged as the single largest party winning 132 seats alone, and its alliance Maha Yuti secured a record 237 seats. Devendra Fadnavis of Bharatiya Janata Party was sworn in as the new CM. None of the opposition parties could win 10% of the seats, hence there is no official opposition.

== Office bearers ==
| Post | Name | Party |
|---|---|---|
| Governor | Jishnu Dev Varma | Independent politician |
| Speaker | Rahul Narwekar | Bharatiya Janata Party |
| Deputy Speaker | Anna Bansode | Nationalist Congress Party |
| Chief Minister | Devendra Fadnavis | Bharatiya Janata Party |
| First Deputy Chief Minister | Eknath Shinde | Shiv Sena |
| Second Deputy Chief Minister | Sunetra Pawar | Nationalist Congress Party |
| Leader of Opposition | Vacant | N/A |

== Members of Legislative Assembly ==
| District | # | Constituency | Member | Party | Alliance | Remarks |
|---|---|---|---|---|---|---|
| Nandurbar | 1 | Akkalkuwa (ST) | Aamshya Padavi | SHS | NDA | |
| Nandurbar | 2 | Shahada (ST) | Rajesh Padvi | BJP | NDA | |
| Nandurbar | 3 | Nandurbar (ST) | Vijaykumar Gavit | BJP | NDA | |
| Nandurbar | 4 | Navapur (ST) | Shirishkumar Naik | INC | MVA | |
| Dhule | 5 | Sakri (ST) | Manjula Gavit | SHS | NDA | |
| Dhule | 6 | Dhule Rural | Raghavendra Patil | BJP | NDA | |
| Dhule | 7 | Dhule City | Anup Agrawal | BJP | NDA | |
| Dhule | 8 | Sindkheda | Jayakumar Rawal | BJP | NDA | |
| Dhule | 9 | Shirpur (ST) | Kashiram Pawara | BJP | NDA | |
| Jalgaon | 10 | Chopda (ST) | Chandrakant Sonawane | SHS | NDA | |
| Jalgaon | 11 | Raver | Amol Jawale | BJP | NDA | |
| Jalgaon | 12 | Bhusawal (SC) | Sanjay Savkare | BJP | NDA | |
| Jalgaon | 13 | Jalgaon City | Suresh Bhole | BJP | NDA | |
| Jalgaon | 14 | Jalgaon Rural | Gulabrao Patil | SHS | NDA | |
| Jalgaon | 15 | Amalner | Anil Bhaidas Patil | NCP | NDA | |
| Jalgaon | 16 | Erandol | Amol Patil | SHS | NDA | |
| Jalgaon | 17 | Chalisgaon | Mangesh Chavan | BJP | NDA | |
| Jalgaon | 18 | Pachora | Kishor Appa Patil | SHS | NDA | |
| Jalgaon | 19 | Jamner | Girish Mahajan | BJP | NDA | |
| Jalgaon | 20 | Muktainagar | Chandrakant Nimba Patil | SHS | NDA | |
| Buldana | 21 | Malkapur | Chainsukh Sancheti | BJP | NDA | |
| Buldana | 22 | Buldhana | Sanjay Gaikwad | SHS | NDA | |
| Buldana | 23 | Chikhali | Shweta Mahale | BJP | NDA | |
| Buldana | 24 | Sindkhed Raja | Manoj Kayande | NCP | NDA | |
| Buldana | 25 | Mehkar (SC) | Siddharth Kharat | SS(UBT) | MVA | |
| Buldana | 26 | Khamgaon | Akash Fundkar | BJP | NDA | |
| Buldana | 27 | Jalgaon (Jamod) | Sanjay Kute | BJP | NDA | |
| Akola | 28 | Akot | Prakash Bharsakale | BJP | NDA | |
| Akola | 29 | Balapur | Nitin Tale | SS(UBT) | MVA | |
| Akola | 30 | Akola West | Sajid Khan Pathan | INC | MVA | |
| Akola | 31 | Akola East | Randhir Savarkar | BJP | NDA | |
| Akola | 32 | Murtizapur (SC) | Harish Pimple | BJP | NDA | |
| Washim | 33 | Risod | Amit Zanak | INC | MVA | |
| Washim | 34 | Washim (SC) | Shyam Khode | BJP | NDA | |
| Washim | 35 | Karanja | Sai Prakash Dahake | BJP | NDA | |
| Amravati | 36 | Dhamangaon Railway | Pratap Adsad | BJP | NDA | |
| Amravati | 37 | Badnera | Ravi Rana | RYSP | NDA | |
| Amravati | 38 | Amravati | Sulbha Khodke | NCP | NDA | |
| Amravati | 39 | Teosa | Rajesh Wankhade | BJP | NDA | |
| Amravati | 40 | Daryapur (SC) | Gajanan Lawate | SS(UBT) | MVA | |
| Amravati | 41 | Melghat (ST) | Kewalram Kale | BJP | NDA | |
| Amravati | 42 | Achalpur | Pravin Tayade | BJP | NDA | |
| Amravati | 43 | Morshi | Chandu Yawalkar | BJP | NDA | |
| Wardha | 44 | Arvi | Sumit Wankhede | BJP | NDA | |
| Wardha | 45 | Deoli | Rajesh Bakane | BJP | NDA | |
| Wardha | 46 | Hinganghat | Samir Kunawar | BJP | NDA | |
| Wardha | 47 | Wardha | Pankaj Bhoyar | BJP | NDA | |
| Nagpur | 48 | Katol | Charansing Thakur | BJP | NDA | |
| Nagpur | 49 | Savner | Ashish Deshmukh | BJP | NDA | |
| Nagpur | 50 | Hingna | Sameer Meghe | BJP | NDA | |
| Nagpur | 51 | Umred (SC) | Sanjay Meshram | INC | MVA | |
| Nagpur | 52 | Nagpur South West | Devendra Fadnavis | BJP | NDA | Chief Minister |
| Nagpur | 53 | Nagpur South | Mohan Mate | BJP | NDA | |
| Nagpur | 54 | Nagpur East | Krishna Khopde | BJP | NDA | |
| Nagpur | 55 | Nagpur Central | Pravin Datke | BJP | NDA | |
| Nagpur | 56 | Nagpur West | Vikas Thakre | INC | MVA | |
| Nagpur | 57 | Nagpur North (SC) | Nitin Raut | INC | MVA | |
| Nagpur | 58 | Kamthi | Chandrashekhar Bawankule | BJP | NDA | |
| Nagpur | 59 | Ramtek | Ashish Jaiswal | SHS | NDA | |
| Bhandara | 60 | Tumsar | Raju Karemore | NCP | NDA | |
| Bhandara | 61 | Bhandara (SC) | Narendra Bhondekar | SHS | NDA | |
| Bhandara | 62 | Sakoli | Nana Patole | INC | MVA | |
| Gondia | 63 | Arjuni Morgaon (SC) | Rajkumar Badole | NCP | NDA | |
| Gondia | 64 | Tirora | Vijay Rahangdale | BJP | NDA | |
| Gondia | 65 | Gondiya | Vinod Agrawal | BJP | NDA | |
| Gondia | 66 | Amgaon (ST) | Sanjay Puram | BJP | NDA | |
| Gadchiroli | 67 | Armori (ST) | Ramdas Masram | INC | MVA | |
| Gadchiroli | 68 | Gadchiroli (ST) | Milind Narote | BJP | NDA | |
| Gadchiroli | 69 | Aheri (ST) | Dharamrao Baba Atram | NCP | NDA | |
| Chandrapur | 70 | Rajura | Deorao Bhongle | BJP | NDA | |
| Chandrapur | 71 | Chandrapur (SC) | Kishor Jorgewar | BJP | NDA | |
| Chandrapur | 72 | Ballarpur | Sudhir Mungantiwar | BJP | NDA | |
| Chandrapur | 73 | Bramhapuri | Vijay Wadettiwar | INC | MVA | |
| Chandrapur | 74 | Chimur | Bunty Bhangdiya | BJP | NDA | |
| Chandrapur | 75 | Warora | Karan Deotale | BJP | NDA | |
| Yavatmal | 76 | Wani | Sanjay Derkar | SS(UBT) | MVA | |
| Yavatmal | 77 | Ralegaon (ST) | Ashok Uike | BJP | NDA | |
| Yavatmal | 78 | Yavatmal | Balasaheb Mangulkar | INC | MVA | |
| Yavatmal | 79 | Digras | Sanjay Rathod | SHS | NDA | |
| Yavatmal | 80 | Arni (ST) | Raju Todsam | BJP | NDA | |
| Yavatmal | 81 | Pusad | Indranil Naik | NCP | NDA | |
| Yavatmal | 82 | Umarkhed (SC) | Kisan Wankhede | BJP | NDA | |
| Nanded | 83 | Kinwat | Bhimrao Keram | BJP | NDA | |
| Nanded | 84 | Hadgaon | Baburao Kadam | SHS | NDA | |
| Nanded | 85 | Bhokar | Sreejaya Chavan | BJP | NDA | |
| Nanded | 86 | Nanded North | Balaji Kalyankar | SHS | NDA | |
| Nanded | 87 | Nanded South | Anand Tidke | SHS | NDA | |
| Nanded | 88 | Loha | Prataprao Chikhalikar | NCP | NDA | |
| Nanded | 89 | Naigaon | Rajesh Pawar | BJP | NDA | |
| Nanded | 90 | Deglur (SC) | Jitesh Antapurkar | BJP | NDA | |
| Nanded | 91 | Mukhed | Tushar Rathod | BJP | NDA | |
| Hingoli | 92 | Basmath | Chandrakant Nawghare | NCP | NDA | |
| Hingoli | 93 | Kalamnuri | Santosh Bangar | SHS | NDA | |
| Hingoli | 94 | Hingoli | Tanaji Mutkule | BJP | NDA | |
| Parbhani | 95 | Jintur | Meghana Bordikar | BJP | NDA | |
| Parbhani | 96 | Parbhani | Rahul Vedprakash Patil | SS(UBT) | MVA | |
| Parbhani | 97 | Gangakhed | Ratnakar Gutte | RSPS | NDA | |
| Parbhani | 98 | Pathri | Rajesh Vitekar | NCP | NDA | |
| Jalna | 99 | Partur | Babanrao Lonikar | BJP | NDA | |
| Jalna | 100 | Ghansawangi | Hikmat Udhan | SHS | NDA | |
| Jalna | 101 | Jalna | Arjun Khotkar | SHS | NDA | |
| Jalna | 102 | Badnapur (SC) | Narayan Kuche | BJP | NDA | |
| Jalna | 103 | Bhokardan | Santosh Danve | BJP | NDA | |
| Chhatrapati Sambhaji Nagar | 104 | Sillod | Abdul Sattar | SHS | NDA | |
| Chhatrapati Sambhaji Nagar | 105 | Kannad | Sanjana Jadhav | SHS | NDA | |
| Chhatrapati Sambhaji Nagar | 106 | Phulambri | Anuradha Chavan | BJP | NDA | |
| Chhatrapati Sambhaji Nagar | 107 | Aurangabad Central | Pradeep Jaiswal | SHS | NDA | |
| Chhatrapati Sambhaji Nagar | 108 | Aurangabad West (SC) | Sanjay Shirsat | SHS | NDA | |
| Chhatrapati Sambhaji Nagar | 109 | Aurangabad East | Atul Save | BJP | NDA | |
| Chhatrapati Sambhaji Nagar | 110 | Paithan | Vilas Bhumre | SHS | NDA | |
| Chhatrapati Sambhaji Nagar | 111 | Gangapur | Prashant Bamb | BJP | NDA | |
| Chhatrapati Sambhaji Nagar | 112 | Vaijapur | Ramesh Bornare | SHS | NDA | |
| Nashik | 113 | Nandgaon | Suhas Kande | SHS | NDA | |
| Nashik | 114 | Malegaon Central | Ismail Abdul Khalique | AIMIM | None | |
| Nashik | 115 | Malegaon Outer | Dadaji Bhuse | SHS | NDA | |
| Nashik | 116 | Baglan (ST) | Dilip Borse | BJP | NDA | |
| Nashik | 117 | Kalwan (ST) | Nitin Pawar | NCP | NDA | |
| Nashik | 118 | Chandwad | Rahul Aher | BJP | NDA | |
| Nashik | 119 | Yevla | Chhagan Bhujbal | NCP | NDA | |
| Nashik | 120 | Sinnar | Manikrao Kokate | NCP | NDA | |
| Nashik | 121 | Niphad | Diliprao Bankar | NCP | NDA | |
| Nashik | 122 | Dindori (ST) | Narhari Zirwal | NCP | NDA | |
| Nashik | 123 | Nashik East | Rahul Dhikale | BJP | NDA | |
| Nashik | 124 | Nashik Central | Devayani Farande | BJP | NDA | |
| Nashik | 125 | Nashik West | Seema Hiray | BJP | NDA | |
| Nashik | 126 | Deolali (SC) | Saroj Ahire | NCP | NDA | |
| Nashik | 127 | Igatpuri (ST) | Hiraman Khoskar | NCP | NDA | |
| Palghar | 128 | Dahanu (ST) | Vinod Bhiva Nikole | CPI(M) | MVA | |
| Palghar | 129 | Vikramgad (ST) | Harishchandra Bhoye | BJP | NDA | |
| Palghar | 130 | Palghar (ST) | Rajendra Gavit | SHS | NDA | |
| Palghar | 131 | Boisar (ST) | Vilas Tare | SHS | NDA | |
| Palghar | 132 | Nalasopara | Rajan Naik | BJP | NDA | |
| Palghar | 133 | Vasai | Sneha Pandit | BJP | NDA | |
| Thane | 134 | Bhiwandi Rural (ST) | Shantaram More | SHS | NDA | |
| Thane | 135 | Shahapur (ST) | Daulat Daroda | NCP | NDA | |
| Thane | 136 | Bhiwandi West | Mahesh Choughule | BJP | NDA | |
| Thane | 137 | Bhiwandi East | Rais Shaikh | SP | None | |
| Thane | 138 | Kalyan West | Vishwanath Bhoir | SHS | NDA | |
| Thane | 139 | Murbad | Kisan Kathore | BJP | NDA | |
| Thane | 140 | Ambernath (SC) | Balaji Kinikar | SHS | NDA | |
| Thane | 141 | Ulhasnagar | Kumar Ailani | BJP | NDA | |
| Thane | 142 | Kalyan East | Sulbha Gaikwad | BJP | NDA | |
| Thane | 143 | Dombivli | Ravindra Chavan | BJP | NDA | |
| Thane | 144 | Kalyan Rural | Rajesh More | SHS | NDA | |
| Thane | 145 | Mira Bhayandar | Narendra Mehta | BJP | NDA | |
| Thane | 146 | Ovala-Majiwada | Pratap Sarnaik | SHS | NDA | |
| Thane | 147 | Kopri-Pachpakhadi | Eknath Shinde | SHS | NDA | Dy Chief Minister |
| Thane | 148 | Thane | Sanjay Kelkar | BJP | NDA | |
| Thane | 149 | Mumbra-Kalwa | Jitendra Awhad | NCP-SP | MVA | |
| Thane | 150 | Airoli | Ganesh Naik | BJP | NDA | |
| Thane | 151 | Belapur | Manda Mhatre | BJP | NDA | |
| Mumbai Suburban | 152 | Borivali | Sanjay Upadhyay | BJP | NDA | |
| Mumbai Suburban | 153 | Dahisar | Manisha Chaudhary | BJP | NDA | |
| Mumbai Suburban | 154 | Magathane | Prakash Surve | SHS | NDA | |
| Mumbai Suburban | 155 | Mulund | Mihir Kotecha | BJP | NDA | |
| Mumbai Suburban | 156 | Vikhroli | Sunil Raut | SS(UBT) | MVA | |
| Mumbai Suburban | 157 | Bhandup West | Ashok Patil | SHS | NDA | |
| Mumbai Suburban | 158 | Jogeshwari East | Anant Nar | SS(UBT) | MVA | |
| Mumbai Suburban | 159 | Dindoshi | Sunil Prabhu | SS(UBT) | MVA | |
| Mumbai Suburban | 160 | Kandivali East | Atul Bhatkhalkar | BJP | NDA | |
| Mumbai Suburban | 161 | Charkop | Yogesh Sagar | BJP | NDA | |
| Mumbai Suburban | 162 | Malad West | Aslam Shaikh | INC | MVA | |
| Mumbai Suburban | 163 | Goregaon | Vidya Thakur | BJP | NDA | |
| Mumbai Suburban | 164 | Versova | Haroon Rashid Khan | SS(UBT) | MVA | |
| Mumbai Suburban | 165 | Andheri West | Ameet Satam | BJP | NDA | |
| Mumbai Suburban | 166 | Andheri East | Murji Patel | SHS | NDA | |
| Mumbai Suburban | 167 | Vile Parle | Parag Alavani | BJP | NDA | |
| Mumbai Suburban | 168 | Chandivali | Dilip Lande | SHS | NDA | |
| Mumbai Suburban | 169 | Ghatkopar West | Ram Kadam | BJP | NDA | |
| Mumbai Suburban | 170 | Ghatkopar East | Parag Shah | BJP | NDA | |
| Mumbai Suburban | 171 | Mankhurd Shivaji Nagar | Abu Asim Azmi | SP | None | |
| Mumbai Suburban | 172 | Anushakti Nagar | Sana Malik | NCP | NDA | |
| Mumbai Suburban | 173 | Chembur | Tukaram Kate | SHS | NDA | |
| Mumbai Suburban | 174 | Kurla(SC) | Mangesh Kudalkar | SHS | NDA | |
| Mumbai Suburban | 175 | Kalina | Sanjay Potnis | SS(UBT) | MVA | |
| Mumbai Suburban | 176 | Vandre East | Varun Sardesai | SS(UBT) | MVA | |
| Mumbai Suburban | 177 | Vandre West | Ashish Shelar | BJP | NDA | |
| Mumbai City | 178 | Dharavi (SC) | Jyoti Gaikwad | INC | MVA | |
| Mumbai City | 179 | Sion Koliwada | R. Tamil Selvan | BJP | NDA | |
| Mumbai City | 180 | Wadala | Kalidas Kolambkar | BJP | NDA | |
| Mumbai City | 181 | Mahim | Mahesh Sawant | SS(UBT) | MVA | |
| Mumbai City | 182 | Worli | Aaditya Thackeray | SS(UBT) | MVA | |
| Mumbai City | 183 | Shivadi | Ajay Choudhari | SS(UBT) | MVA | |
| Mumbai City | 184 | Byculla | Manoj Jamsutkar | SS(UBT) | MVA | |
| Mumbai City | 185 | Malabar Hill | Mangal Lodha | BJP | NDA | |
| Mumbai City | 186 | Mumbadevi | Amin Patel | INC | MVA | |
| Mumbai City | 187 | Colaba | Rahul Narwekar | BJP | NDA | |
| Raigad | 188 | Panvel | Prashant Thakur | BJP | NDA | |
| Raigad | 189 | Karjat | Mahendra Thorve | SHS | NDA | |
| Raigad | 190 | Uran | Mahesh Baldi | BJP | NDA | |
| Raigad | 191 | Pen | Ravisheth Patil | BJP | NDA | |
| Raigad | 192 | Alibag | Mahendra Dalvi | SHS | NDA | |
| Raigad | 193 | Shrivardhan | Aditi Tatkare | NCP | NDA | |
| Raigad | 194 | Mahad | Bharatshet Gogawale | SHS | NDA | |
| Pune | 195 | Junnar | Sharaddada Sonavane | IND | NDA | |
| Pune | 196 | Ambegaon | Dilip Walse Patil | NCP | NDA | |
| Pune | 197 | Khed Alandi | Babaji Kale | SS(UBT) | MVA | |
| Pune | 198 | Shirur | Dnyaneshwar Katke | NCP | NDA | |
| Pune | 199 | Daund | Rahul Kul | BJP | NDA | |
| Pune | 200 | Indapur | Dattatray Bharne | NCP | NDA | |
| Pune | 201 | Baramati | Ajit Pawar | NCP | NDA | Died on 28 January 2026 |
| Pune | 201 | Baramati | Sunetra Pawar | NCP | NDA | Dy Chief Minister |
| Pune | 202 | Purandar | Vijay Shivtare | SHS | NDA | |
| Pune | 203 | Bhor | Shankar Mandekar | NCP | NDA | |
| Pune | 204 | Maval | Sunil Shelke | NCP | NDA | |
| Pune | 205 | Chinchwad | Shankar Jagtap | BJP | NDA | |
| Pune | 206 | Pimpri (SC) | Anna Bansode | NCP | NDA | |
| Pune | 207 | Bhosari | Mahesh Landge | BJP | NDA | |
| Pune | 208 | Vadgaon Sheri | Bapusaheb Pathare | NCP-SP | MVA | |
| Pune | 209 | Shivajinagar | Siddharth Shirole | BJP | NDA | |
| Pune | 210 | Kothrud | Chandrakant Patil | BJP | NDA | |
| Pune | 211 | Khadakwasala | Bhimrao Tapkir | BJP | NDA | |
| Pune | 212 | Parvati | Madhuri Misal | BJP | NDA | |
| Pune | 213 | Hadapsar | Chetan Tupe | NCP | NDA | |
| Pune | 214 | Pune Cantonment | Sunil Kamble | BJP | NDA | |
| Pune | 215 | Kasba Peth | Hemant Rasane | BJP | NDA | |
| Ahmednagar | 216 | Akole (ST) | Kiran Lahamate | NCP | NDA | |
| Ahmednagar | 217 | Sangamner | Amol Khatal | SHS | NDA | |
| Ahmednagar | 218 | Shirdi | Radhakrishna Vikhe Patil | BJP | NDA | |
| Ahmednagar | 219 | Kopargaon | Ashutosh Kale | NCP | NDA | |
| Ahmednagar | 220 | Shrirampur (SC) | Hemant Ogale | INC | MVA | |
| Ahmednagar | 221 | Nevasa | Vitthalrao Langhe | SHS | NDA | |
| Ahmednagar | 222 | Shevgaon | Monika Rajale | BJP | NDA | |
| Ahmednagar | 223 | Rahuri | Shivaji Kardile | BJP | NDA | Died on 17 October 2025 |
| Ahmednagar | 223 | Rahuri | Akshay Shivajirao Kardile | BJP | NDA | |
| Ahmednagar | 224 | Parner | Kashinath Date | NCP | NDA | |
| Ahmednagar | 225 | Ahmednagar City | Sangram Jagtap | NCP | NDA | |
| Ahmednagar | 226 | Shrigonda | Vikram Pachpute | BJP | NDA | |
| Ahmednagar | 227 | Karjat Jamkhed | Rohit Pawar | NCP-SP | MVA | |
| Beed | 228 | Georai (SC) | Vijaysinh Pandit | NCP | NDA | |
| Beed | 229 | Majalgaon | Prakashdada Solanke | NCP | NDA | |
| Beed | 230 | Beed | Sandeep Kshirsagar | NCP-SP | MVA | |
| Beed | 231 | Ashti | Suresh Dhas | BJP | NDA | |
| Beed | 232 | Kaij (SC) | Namita Mundada | BJP | NDA | |
| Beed | 233 | Parli | Dhananjay Munde | NCP | NDA | |
| Latur | 234 | Latur Rural | Ramesh Karad | BJP | NDA | |
| Latur | 235 | Latur City | Amit Deshmukh | INC | MVA | |
| Latur | 236 | Ahmadpur | Babasaheb Patil | NCP | NDA | |
| Latur | 237 | Udgir (SC) | Sanjay Bansode | NCP | NDA | |
| Latur | 238 | Nilanga | Sambhaji Patil Nilangekar | BJP | NDA | |
| Latur | 239 | Ausa | Abhimanyu Pawar | BJP | NDA | |
| Dharashiv | 240 | Umarga (SC) | Pravin Virbhadrayya Swami | SS(UBT) | MVA | |
| Dharashiv | 241 | Tuljapur | Ranajagjitsinha Patil | BJP | NDA | |
| Dharashiv | 242 | Dharashiv | Kailas Patil | SS(UBT) | MVA | |
| Dharashiv | 243 | Paranda | Tanaji Sawant | SHS | NDA | |
| Solapur | 244 | Karmala | Narayan Patil | NCP-SP | MVA | |
| Solapur | 245 | Madha | Abhijeet Patil | NCP-SP | MVA | |
| Solapur | 246 | Barshi | Dilip Sopal | SS(UBT) | MVA | |
| Solapur | 247 | Mohol (SC) | Raju Khare | NCP-SP | MVA | |
| Solapur | 248 | Solapur City North | Vijay Deshmukh | BJP | NDA | |
| Solapur | 249 | Solapur City Central | Devendra Kothe | BJP | NDA | |
| Solapur | 250 | Akkalkot | Sachin Kalyanshetti | BJP | NDA | |
| Solapur | 251 | Solapur South | Subhash Deshmukh | BJP | NDA | |
| Solapur | 252 | Pandharpur | Samadhan Autade | BJP | NDA | |
| Solapur | 253 | Sangola | Babasaheb Deshmukh | PWPI | MVA | |
| Solapur | 254 | Malshiras (SC) | Uttamrao Jankar | NCP-SP | MVA | |
| Satara | 255 | Phaltan (SC) | Sachin Patil | NCP | NDA | |
| Satara | 256 | Wai | Makrand Jadhav - Patil | NCP | NDA | |
| Satara | 257 | Koregaon | Mahesh Shinde | SHS | NDA | |
| Satara | 258 | Man | Jaykumar Gore | BJP | NDA | |
| Satara | 259 | Karad North | Manoj Ghorpade | BJP | NDA | |
| Satara | 260 | Karad South | Atulbaba Bhosale | BJP | NDA | |
| Satara | 261 | Patan | Shambhuraj Desai | SHS | NDA | |
| Satara | 262 | Satara | Shivendra Raje Bhosale | BJP | NDA | |
| Ratnagiri | 263 | Dapoli | Yogesh Kadam | SHS | NDA | |
| Ratnagiri | 264 | Guhagar | Bhaskar Jadhav | SS(UBT) | MVA | |
| Ratnagiri | 265 | Chiplun | Shekhar Nikam | NCP | NDA | |
| Ratnagiri | 266 | Ratnagiri | Uday Samant | SHS | NDA | |
| Ratnagiri | 267 | Rajapur | Kiran Samant | SHS | NDA | |
| Sindhudurg | 268 | Kankavli | Nitesh Rane | BJP | NDA | |
| Sindhudurg | 269 | Kudal | Nilesh Rane | SHS | NDA | |
| Sindhudurg | 270 | Sawantwadi | Deepak Kesarkar | SHS | NDA | |
| Kolhapur | 271 | Chandgad | Shivaji Patil | IND | NDA | |
| Kolhapur | 272 | Radhanagari | Prakashrao Abitkar | SHS | NDA | |
| Kolhapur | 273 | Kagal | Hasan Mushrif | NCP | NDA | |
| Kolhapur | 274 | Kolhapur South | Amal Mahadik | BJP | NDA | |
| Kolhapur | 275 | Karvir | Chandradip Narke | SHS | NDA | |
| Kolhapur | 276 | Kolhapur North | Rajesh Kshirsagar | SHS | NDA | |
| Kolhapur | 277 | Shahuwadi | Vinay Kore | JSS | NDA | |
| Kolhapur | 278 | Hatkanangle (SC) | Ashokrao Mane | JSS | NDA | |
| Kolhapur | 279 | Ichalkaranji | Rahul Awade | BJP | NDA | |
| Kolhapur | 280 | Shirol | Rajendra Patil Yadravkar | RSVA | NDA | |
| Sangli | 281 | Miraj (SC) | Suresh Khade | BJP | NDA | |
| Sangli | 282 | Sangli | Sudhir Gadgil | BJP | NDA | |
| Sangli | 283 | Islampur | Jayant Patil | NCP-SP | MVA | |
| Sangli | 284 | Shirala | Satyajit Deshmukh | BJP | NDA | |
| Sangli | 285 | Palus-Kadegaon | Vishwajeet Kadam | INC | MVA | |
| Sangli | 286 | Khanapur | Suhas Babar | SHS | NDA | |
| Sangli | 287 | Tasgaon-Kavathe Mahankal | Rohit Patil | NCP-SP | MVA | |
| Sangli | 288 | Jat | Gopichand Padalkar | BJP | NDA | |

== Composition ==
| Alliance | Political party | No. of MLAs | Leader of the party |
|---|---|---|---|
| Government; MY; Seats: 235 | Bharatiya Janata Party | 132 | Devendra Fadnavis (Chief Minister) |
| Government; MY; Seats: 235 | Shiv Sena | 57 | Eknath Shinde (Deputy Chief Minister) |
| Government; MY; Seats: 235 | Nationalist Congress Party | 41 | Sunetra Pawar (Deputy Chief Minister) |
| Government; MY; Seats: 235 | Jan Surajya Shakti | 2 | Vinay Kore |
| Government; MY; Seats: 235 | Rashtriya Samaj Paksha | 1 | Mahadev Jankar |
| Government; MY; Seats: 235 | Rajarshi Shahu Vikas Aghadi | 1 | Rajendra Patil |
| Government; MY; Seats: 235 | Rashtriya Yuva Swabhiman Party | 1 | Ravi Rana |
| Government; MY; Seats: 235 | IND | 1 | Shivaji Patil |
| Opposition; MVA; Seats: 50 | Shiv Sena (Uddhav Balasaheb Thackeray) | 20 | Uddhav Thackeray |
| Opposition; MVA; Seats: 50 | Indian National Congress | 16 | Prithviraj Chavan |
| Opposition; MVA; Seats: 50 | Nationalist Congress Party (Sharadchandra Pawar) | 10 | Sharad Pawar |
| Opposition; MVA; Seats: 50 | Communist Party of India (Marxist) | 1 | Vinod Nikole |
| Opposition; MVA; Seats: 50 | Peasants and Workers Party of India | 1 | Jayant Patil |
| Others; Seats: 3 | Samajwadi Party | 2 | Abu Azmi |
| Others; Seats: 3 | All India Majlis-e-Ittehadul Muslimeen | 1 | Ismail Abdul Khalique |
| Total | | 288 | |
