= Amravati Lok Sabha constituency =

Lok Sabha constituency in Maharashtra, India

Coordinates: 20°55′54.99″N 77°45′55.05″E

Amravati
- Lok Sabha constituency

Constituency details
- Country: India
- Region: Western India
- State: Maharashtra
- Assembly constituencies: Badnera; Amravati; Teosa; Daryapur; Melghat; Achalpur
- Established: 1951 (75 years ago)
- Total electors: 18,36,078
- Reservation: SC

Member of Parliament
- 18th Lok Sabha
- Incumbent Balwant Wankhade
- Party: Indian National Congress
- Elected year: 2024

Amravati Lok Sabha constituency is one of the 48 Lok Sabha (parliamentary) constituencies in Maharashtra state in western India.

== Assembly segments ==
Presently, Amravati Lok Sabha constituency comprises six Vidhan Sabha (legislative assembly) segments. These segments (with constituency number and reservation status) are:

No	Name	District	Member	Party	Leading (in 2024)
37	Badnera	Amravati	Ravi Rana	RYSP	BJP
38	Amravati	Amravati	Sulbha Khodke	NCP	INC
39	Teosa	Amravati	Rajesh Shriramji Wankhade	BJP	INC
40	Daryapur (SC)	Amravati	Gajanan Lawate	SS(UBT)	INC
41	Melghat (ST)	Amravati	Kewalram Kale	BJP	BJP
42	Achalpur	Amravati	Pravin Vasantrao Tayade	BJP	INC

== Members of Parliament ==
Year	Name	Party
1952	Panjabrao Deshmukh (Note: Amravati East)	Indian National Congress
1952	Krishnarao Deshmukh (Note: Amravati West)	Indian National Congress
1957	Panjabrao Deshmukh	Indian National Congress
1962	Panjabrao Deshmukh	Indian National Congress
1965^	Vimalbai Deshmukh	Indian National Congress
1967	Krishnarao Deshmukh	Indian National Congress
1971	Krishnarao Deshmukh	Indian National Congress
1977	Nanasaheb Bonde	Indian National Congress
1980	Usha Choudhari	Indian National Congress
1984	Usha Choudhari	Indian National Congress
1989	Sudam Deshmukh	Communist Party of India
1991	Pratibha Patil	Indian National Congress
1996	Anant Gudhe	Shiv Sena
1998	R. S. Gavai	Republican Party of India
1999	Anant Gudhe	Shiv Sena
2004	Anant Gudhe	Shiv Sena
2009	Anandrao Adsul	Shiv Sena
2014	Anandrao Adsul	Shiv Sena
2019	Navneet Kaur Rana (Note: Officially supported by the Nationalist Congress Party)	Independent
2024	Balwant Baswant Wankhade	Indian National Congress

^ by-poll

== Election results ==
=== General Elections 2024 ===
2024 Indian general elections: Amravati
Party	Candidate	Votes	%	±%
INC	Balwant Baswant Wankhade	526,271	44.84	New
BJP	Navneet Kaur Rana	5,06,540	43.16	▼0.55
PHJSP	Dinesh Ganeshdas Boob	85,300	7.27	N/A
NOTA	None of the above	2,544	0.22	▼0.26
Majority		19,731	1.68	▼1.64
Turnout		11,73,579	63.91	▲3.15
INC gain from Independent		Swing		

=== General Elections Result 2019 ===
2019 Indian general elections: Amravati
Party	Candidate	Votes	%	±%
Independent	Navneet Kaur Rana	510,947	45.95	
SS	Anandrao Adsul	4,73,996	42.61	
VBA	Gunavant Devpare	65,135	5.86	
BSP	Arun Motiramji Wankhade	12,336	.1.11	−8.71
NOTA	None of the above	5,322	0.48	
Majority		36,951	3.32	
Turnout		11,13,853	60.76	
Independent gain from SS		Swing		

=== General Elections Result 2014 ===
2014 Indian general elections: Amravati
Party	Candidate	Votes	%	±%
SS	Anandrao Adsul	467,212	46.72	+3.81
NCP	Navneet Kaur Rana	3,29,280	32.93	
BSP	Gunvant Devpare	98,200	9.82	+4.12
RPI	Rajendra Gavai	54,278	5.42	N/A
AAP	Bhawna Bhavesh Vasnik	6,424	0.6	
Majority		1,37,932	13.79	+5.36
Turnout		10,04,542	62.29	
SS hold		Swing	+3.81	

=== General Elections Result 2009 ===
2009 Indian general elections: Amravati
Party	Candidate	Votes	%	±%
SS	Anandrao Adsul	314,286	42.91	
RPI(G)	Rajendra Gavai	2,52,570	34.48	
Independent	Dr. Rajiv Jamthe	64,438	8.80	
BSP	Gangadhar Gade	41,775	5.70	
Majority		61,716	8.43	
Turnout		7,32,508	51.45	
SS hold		Swing		

== See also ==
- Amravati district
- Wardha district
- Ramtek Lok Sabha constituency (for Amravati West Lok Sabha constituency abolished after 1951 elections)
- List of constituencies of the Lok Sabha
