= Balwant Wankhade =

Indian politician

Member of Parliament, Lok Sabha
- Incumbent
- Assumed office 24 June 2024
- Preceded by: Navneet Kaur Rana
- Constituency: Amravati, Maharashtra

Member of the Maharashtra Legislative Assembly
- In office 24 October 2019 – 12 June 2024
- Preceded by: Ramesh Ganpatrao Bundile
- Succeeded by: Gajanan Lawate
- Constituency: Daryapur

Personal details
- Born: 2 July 1967 (age 59) Maharashtra, India
- Party: Indian National Congress
- Spouse: Manda Balwant Wankhade
- Parent(s): Baswant Sawanji Wankhade, Sitabai Baswant Wankhade

Balwant Baswant Wankhade is an Indian politician serving as a Member of Parliament, Lok Sabha from Amravati since June 2024. He is a Member of the Indian National Congress from Maharashtra.

== Political career ==
Balwant Wankhede's journey from sarpanch to parliamentarian has taken place without any political legacy. Before the 2024 Lok Sabha election, he was elected from Daryapur Assembly constituency in the 2019 Maharashtra elections.

Balwant Wankhade is a resident of Lehgaon in Daryapur taluka, Amravati district of Maharashtra. His political career started from 2005. He was a member of Lehgaon Gram Panchayat till 2010 and also served as its Sarpanch.

Balwant Wankhade served in various capacities in the Republican Party of India (Gavai), being close to party leaders R. S. Gavai and D. J. Wakpanjar. After being elected as a member of the Amravati District Council in 2012, he also served as the Health and Finance Chairman. He was the Chairman of Amravati District Council from 2017 to 2019. Balwant Wankhade also worked in the cooperative sector. From 2005 to 2020, he was a director of Daryapur Agricultural Produce Market Committee. He also worked as a director of Amravati District Central Co-operative Bank.

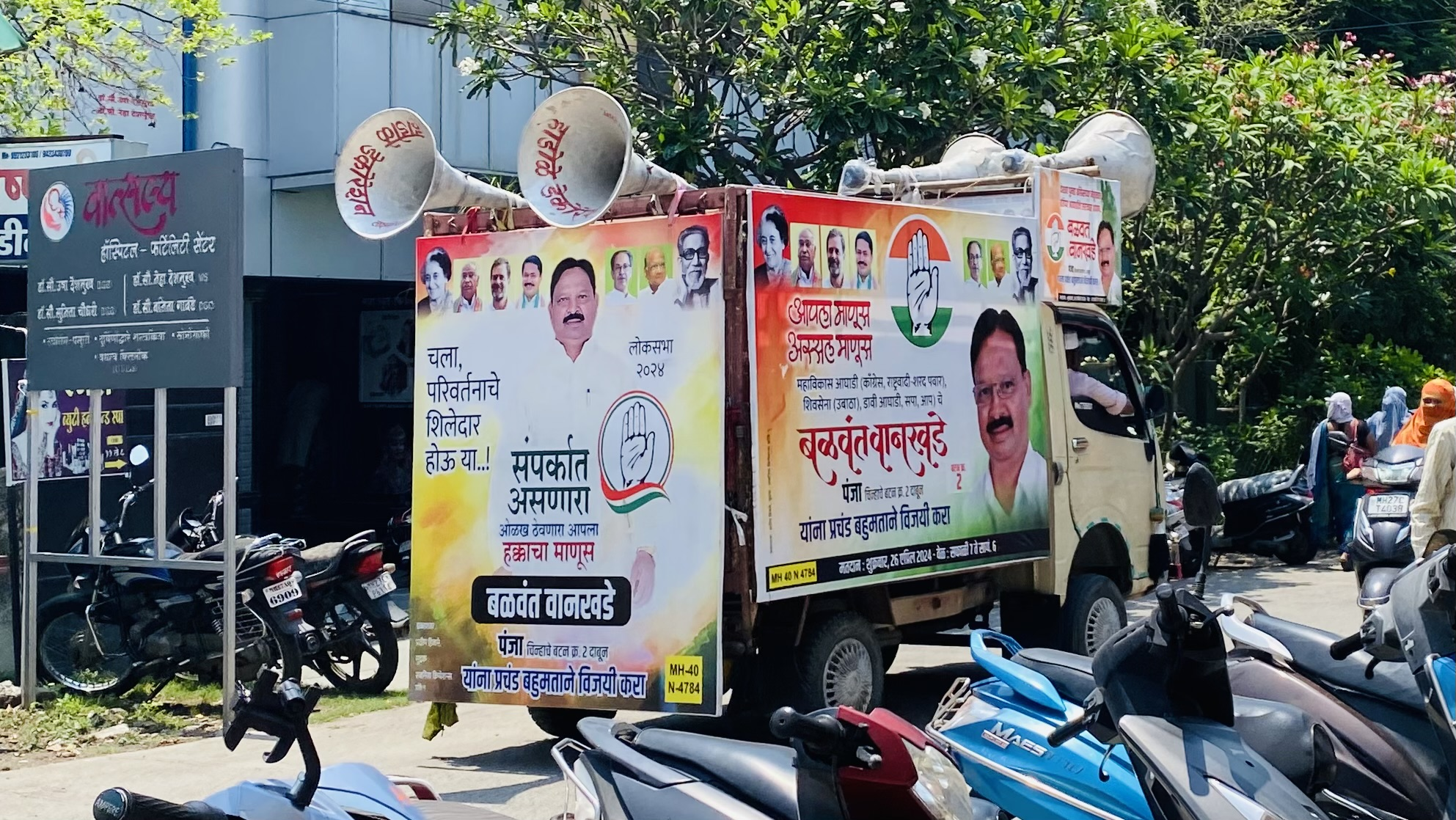
Campaign of Balwant Wankhade during 2024 General Elections

In 2009, he contested as an independent from the Daryapur Assembly constituency, where he lost, but got the second highest number of votes. Daryapur Assembly constituency is reserved for Scheduled Castes (SC).

In the 2014 assembly elections, he contested as a candidate of RPI(G) from Daryapur. This time too he had to face defeat. But, in 2019, he contested as a Congress party candidate and was elected with a margin of more than 30,000 votes. He resigned from his MLA position on 12 June 2024 after being elected as MP from Amravati Lok Sabha constituency on 4 June 2024.

Amravati Lok Sabha Constituency is reserved for Scheduled Castes. Navneet Kaur Rana's independent candidature in the 2019 Lok Sabha elections was supported by the Indian National Congress and the Nationalist Congress Party. However, she supported the BJP government at the center immediately after the elections. Due to this, the Maha Vikas Aghadi fielded Balwant Wankhede against Navneet Rana during the 2024 Lok Sabha elections.

Wankhade won the Amravati Lok Sabha constituency in the 2024 Lok Sabha election. He defeated BJP candidate and then MP Navneet Kaur Rana. He was elected with almost 20,000 votes. On 24 June 2024, Wankhede took oath as a member of parliament in the Lok Sabha. He is one of the three Buddhist MPs in the 18th Lok Sabha.

== Personal life ==
Balwant Wankhade is a Buddhist.
