= Nanasaheb Bonde =

Indian politician (1914–2000)

Member of Parliament, Lok Sabha
- In office 1977–1980
- Preceded by: Krishnarao Gulabrao Deshmukh
- Succeeded by: Usha Choudhari
- Constituency: Amravati

Personal details
- Born: 6 July 1914 Saur Taluk, Amravati District, Bombay Presidency, British India (present-day Maharashtra, India)
- Died: 21 August 2000 (aged 86)
- Party: Indian National Congress
- Spouse: Sau Venutai

Nanasaheb Bonde (1914-2000) was an Indian politician, elected to the Lok Sabha, the lower house of the Parliament of India as a member of the Indian National Congress.
