= Abhijit Adsul =

Indian politician

- अभिजीत अडसूळ

Member of Legislative Assembly of Maharashtra
- In office 2009–2014
- Preceded by: Prakash Gunvantrao Bharsakale
- Succeeded by: Ramesh Ganpatrao Bundile
- Constituency: Daryapur

Personal details
- Party: Shiv Sena
- Relatives: Anandrao Adsul (Father)

Abhijit Anandrao Adsul (Marathi: अभिजीत अडसूळ) is an Indian politician and member of the Shiv Sena. He was elected to Maharashtra Legislative Assembly in 2009 from the Daryapur Vidhan Sabha constituency in Amravati District.

== Positions held ==
- 2009: Elected to Maharashtra Legislative Assembly
- 2015: Elected as Director of Mumbai District Central Co-operative Bank Ltd.
