= Narayanrao Uttamrao Deshmukh =

Indian politician

Member of the Maharashtra Legislative Assembly for Daryapur
- In office 1967–1972
- Preceded by: Jagannath Deorao Gawande
- Succeeded by: Kokila Jagannath Gawande

Minister of State
- In office 1967–1972

Personal details
- Party: Indian National Congress
- Occupation: Agriculturist

Narayanrao Uttamrao Deshmukh or N.U. Deshmukh is an Indian politician from Yeoda Village Taluka Daryapur District Amravati Maharashtra and a member of the Indian National Congress, he was elected in 1967 to the Maharashtra Legislative Assembly from the Daryapur constituency. He later became a State Minister in Vasantrao Naik's Cabinet.
