= Ramesh Ganpatrao Bundile =

Indian politician

Ramesh Bundile

Member of the Maharashtra Legislative Assembly for Daryapur
- In office 2014–2019
- Preceded by: Abhijit Adsul
- Succeeded by: Balwant Baswant Wankhade

Personal details
- Born: 20 January 1964 (age 62) Daryapur, Maharashtra, India
- Party: Bharatiya Janata Party
- Spouse: Meena Bundile
- Children: Piyush Bundile
- Parent: Ganpatrao Bundile (father)
- Education: B.E Electrical
- Alma mater: Nagpur University
- Occupation: Politician

Ramesh Ganpatrao Bundile is a member of the 13th Maharashtra Legislative Assembly. He represented the Daryapur Assembly Constituency and belongs to the Bharatiya Janata Party. He was a Chief engineer of MSEDCL who retired in December 2012.
