= Akot Assembly constituency =

Constituency of the Maharashtra legislative assembly in India

Coordinates: 19°32′31.77″N 74°0′19.26″E

Akot
- Constituency No. 28 for the Maharashtra Legislative Assembly

Constituency details
- Country: India
- Region: Western India
- State: Maharashtra
- District: Akola
- Lok Sabha constituency: Akola
- Established: 1952
- Total electors: 311,972
- Reservation: None

Member of Legislative Assembly
- 15th Maharashtra Legislative Assembly
- Incumbent Prakash Gunvantrao Bharsakale
- Party: BJP
- Alliance: NDA
- Elected year: 2024

Akot Assembly constituency is one of the 288 constituencies of Maharashtra Vidhan Sabha and one of the five which are located in the Akola district.

It is a part of the Akola (Lok Sabha constituency) along with five other assembly constituencies, viz Balapur, Akola West, and Akola East, Murtizapur (SC) and Risod from Washim district.

As per orders of Delimitation of Parliamentary and Assembly constituencies Order, 2008, No. 28 Akot Assembly constituency is composed of the following: 1. Telhara Tehsil, 2. Akot Tehsil (Part), Revenue Circle- Umara, Panaj, Akot and Akot (MC). of Akola district.

== Members of the Legislative Assembly ==
Year	Member	Party
1952	Saqui Niyazi Mohammad Subhan	Indian National Congress
1957	Saqui Niyazi Mohammad Subhan	Indian National Congress
1962	Gopalrao Bajirao Khedkar	Indian National Congress
1967	Gopalrao Bajirao Khedkar	Indian National Congress
1972	Manohar Bhikaji Tapre (Tayade )	Indian National Congress
1978	Gangane Sudhakar Ramkrishna	Indian National Congress
1980	Manohar Bhikaji Tapre (Tayde)	Indian National Congress
1985	Gangane Sudhakar Ramkrishna	Indian National Congress
1990	Jagannath Sitaramji Dhone	Shiv Sena
1995	Karale Rameshwar Wasudeo	Shiv Sena
1999	Ramdas Maniram Bodkhe	Bharipa Bahujan Mahasangh
2004	Gulabrao Ramraoji Gawande	Shiv Sena
2009	Sanjay Laxman Gawande	Shiv Sena
2014	Prakash Gunvantrao Bharsakale	Bharatiya Janata Party
2019	Prakash Gunvantrao Bharsakale	Bharatiya Janata Party
2024	Prakash Gunvantrao Bharsakale	Bharatiya Janata Party

== Election results ==
=== Assembly Election 2024 ===
2024 Maharashtra Legislative Assembly election : Akot
Party	Candidate	Votes	%	±%
BJP	Prakash Gunvantrao Bharsakale	93,338	43.74	▲17.05
INC	Mahesh Sudhakarrao Gangane	74,487	34.91	▲19.71
VBA	Deepak Ramdas Bodkhe	34,135	16.00	▼6.70
SBP	Lalit Sudhakarrao Bahale	5,955	2.79	New
Independent	Ramprabhu Gajanan Tarale	2,381	1.12	New
NOTA	None of the above	1,161	0.54	▲0.07
Margin of victory		18,851	8.83	▲4.84
Turnout		214,543	68.77	▲4.57
Total valid votes		213,382		
Registered electors		311,972		▲9.41
BJP hold		Swing	▲17.05	

=== Assembly Election 2019 ===
2019 Maharashtra Legislative Assembly election : Akot
Party	Candidate	Votes	%	±%
BJP	Prakash Gunvantrao Bharsakale	48,586	26.69	▼15.79
VBA	Adv. Santosh Vasant Rahate	41,326	22.70	New
Independent	Anil Manikrao Gawande	28,183	15.48	New
INC	Bodkhe Sanjay Ramdas	27,679	15.20	▼8.24
PHJSP	Tushar Najukrao Pundkar	23,934	13.15	New
Independent	Ramkrushna Laxman Dhigar	3,817	2.10	New
Independent	Abdul Sadique Abdul Khalique	2,947	1.62	New
MPS(T)	Gajanan Shantaram Tayade	1,288	0.71	New
NOTA	None of the above	857	0.47	▲0.04
Margin of victory		7,260	3.99	▼15.05
Turnout		183,068	64.20	▲3.42
Total valid votes		182,058		
Registered electors		285,150		▲4.56
BJP hold		Swing	▼15.79	

=== Assembly Election 2014 ===
2014 Maharashtra Legislative Assembly election : Akot
Party	Candidate	Votes	%	±%
BJP	Prakash Gunvantrao Bharsakale	70,086	42.48	New
INC	Gangane Mahesh Sudhakarrao	38,675	23.44	▼1.47
BBM	Wankhade Pradeep Sadashiv	32,350	19.61	▼2.43
SS	Sanjay Laxman Gawande	14,024	8.50	▼17.06
NCP	Raju Vitthalrao Boche	3,200	1.94	New
BSP	Daberao Vinod Nandkishor	1,253	0.76	New
Independent	Syd. Shareef Syd. Sikandar	992	0.60	New
NOTA	None of the above	706	0.43	New
Margin of victory		31,411	19.04	▲18.39
Turnout		165,753	60.78	▼1.21
Total valid votes		164,976		
Registered electors		272,708		▲14.12
BJP gain from SS		Swing	▲16.92	

=== Assembly Election 2009 ===
2009 Maharashtra Legislative Assembly election : Akot
Party	Candidate	Votes	%	±%
SS	Gawande Sanjay Laxman	37,834	25.56	▼10.79
INC	Gangane Sudhakar Ramkrishna	36,869	24.91	▲10.37
BBM	Mankar Prabhakar Tulshiram	32,629	22.04	▲1.01
Independent	Prakash Gunvantrao Bharsakale	32,415	21.90	New
MNS	Gajanan Gopalrao Pundkar	2,216	1.50	New
Independent	Salim Ahmad Khan Sabje Khan	1,536	1.04	New
RPI(A)	Syd. Matin Ahmad Syd. Ab. Sattar	945	0.64	New
Margin of victory		965	0.65	▼13.41
Turnout		148,125	61.99	▼11.07
Total valid votes		148,032		
Registered electors		238,960		▲22.05
SS hold		Swing	▼10.79	

=== Assembly Election 2004 ===
2004 Maharashtra Legislative Assembly election : Akot
Party	Candidate	Votes	%	±%
SS	Gulabrao Ramraoji Gawande	52,000	36.35	▲10.68
Independent	Hidayatullah Barkatullah Patel	31,889	22.29	New
BBM	Ambalkar Bhaurao Suryabhan	30,078	21.03	▼14.04
INC	Bodkhe Ramdas Maniram	20,801	14.54	New
Independent	Rameshwar Wasudeo Karale	4,666	3.26	New
BSP	Samadhan Shivaram Tayade	1,169	0.82	New
PWPI	Prabhakarrao Vishwanath Sawarkar	1,128	0.79	New
Margin of victory		20,111	14.06	▲4.66
Turnout		143,047	73.06	▲10.26
Total valid votes		143,046		
Registered electors		195,783		▲15.46
SS gain from BBM		Swing	▲1.28	

=== Assembly Election 1999 ===
1999 Maharashtra Legislative Assembly election : Akot
Party	Candidate	Votes	%	±%
BBM	Bodkhe Ramdas Maniram	35,400	35.07	New
SS	Karale Rameshwar Wasudeo	25,909	25.67	▼5.60
NCP	Dr. Dhone Jagannath Sitaram	19,527	19.35	New
Independent	Syd. Shareef Syd. Sikandar	9,432	9.34	New
Independent	Chaukhande Purushottam Madhukarrao	9,364	9.28	New
Margin of victory		9,491	9.40	▲2.61
Turnout		106,484	62.80	▼14.62
Total valid votes		100,936		
Registered electors		169,573		▲3.19
BBM gain from SS		Swing	▲3.80	

=== Assembly Election 1995 ===
1995 Maharashtra Legislative Assembly election : Akot
Party	Candidate	Votes	%	±%
SS	Karale Rameshwar Wasudeo	39,104	31.27	▼4.43
INC	Sudhakar Ramkrushna Gangane	30,613	24.48	▼1.64
Independent	Dr. Dhone Jagannath Sitaram	22,635	18.10	New
BBM	Purushottam Alias Balasaheb Ramchandra Sagne	18,592	14.87	New
Independent	Prof. Sharad Patil	5,336	4.27	New
RPI	Gawarguru Sanjay Mahadeo	1,893	1.51	New
Independent	Kahar Harichandra Shankar	1,326	1.06	New
Independent	Vijay Tulshiramsing Khannade	928	0.74	New
Margin of victory		8,491	6.79	▼2.79
Turnout		127,223	77.42	▲6.59
Total valid votes		125,035		
Registered electors		164,324		▲16.01
SS hold		Swing	▼4.43	

=== Assembly Election 1990 ===
1990 Maharashtra Legislative Assembly election : Akot
Party	Candidate	Votes	%	±%
SS	Jagannath Sitaramji Dhone	35,436	35.70	New
INC	Gangane Sudhakar Ramkrishna	25,926	26.12	▼30.43
Akhil Bhartiya Maratha Mahasangh	Mankar Prabhakar Tulshiram	17,649	17.78	New
BRP	Atmaram Tulshiram Bhopale	12,818	12.91	New
Independent	Syd. Shareef Syd. Sikandar	5,171	5.21	New
PWPI	Sawarkar Prabhakarrao Vishwa Nathrao	1,037	1.04	New
Margin of victory		9,510	9.58	▼17.04
Turnout		100,324	70.83	▲4.31
Total valid votes		99,264		
Registered electors		141,642		▲26.89
SS gain from INC		Swing	▼20.85	

=== Assembly Election 1985 ===
1985 Maharashtra Legislative Assembly election : Akot
Party	Candidate	Votes	%	±%
INC	Gangane Sudhakar Ramkrishna	41,426	56.55	New
Independent	Atmaram Tulshiram Bhople	21,922	29.92	New
BJP	Deepak Rambhau Gawande	9,093	12.41	▼22.38
Margin of victory		19,504	26.62	▲13.57
Turnout		74,253	66.52	▲4.49
Total valid votes		73,262		
Registered electors		111,625		▲9.66
INC gain from INC(I)		Swing	▲8.71	

=== Assembly Election 1980 ===
1980 Maharashtra Legislative Assembly election : Akot
Party	Candidate	Votes	%	±%
INC(I)	Tapre Manohar Bhikaji	29,616	47.84	▼2.97
BJP	Bhople Sampatrao Bhauji	21,538	34.79	New
RPI(K)	Khobragade Bhaurao Nathuji	7,519	12.15	New
Independent	Chaukhande Babarao Rajaram	3,233	5.22	New
Margin of victory		8,078	13.05	▼4.31
Turnout		63,144	62.03	▼15.99
Total valid votes		61,906		
Registered electors		101,796		▲7.88
INC(I) hold		Swing	▼2.97	

=== Assembly Election 1978 ===
1978 Maharashtra Legislative Assembly election : Akot
Party	Candidate	Votes	%	±%
INC(I)	Gangane Sudhakar Ramkrishna	36,603	50.81	New
JP	Tidke Kashinath Shamrao	24,096	33.45	New
INC	Tapre Manohar Bhikaji	11,063	15.36	▼37.24
Margin of victory		12,507	17.36	▲4.64
Turnout		73,620	78.02	▲2.52
Total valid votes		72,035		
Registered electors		94,361		▼2.61
INC(I) gain from INC		Swing	▼1.79	

=== Assembly Election 1972 ===
1972 Maharashtra Legislative Assembly election : Akot
Party	Candidate	Votes	%	±%
INC	Manohar Bhikaji Tayade	34,114	52.60	▼5.39
Independent	Bhimrao Bhaurao Wankhade	25,866	39.88	New
RPI	Waman Raoji Bhatkar	3,733	5.76	New
AIFB	Rajaninath Pote	1,146	1.77	New
Margin of victory		8,248	12.72	▼8.23
Turnout		73,158	75.50	▲0.44
Total valid votes		64,859		
Registered electors		96,894		▲14.45
INC hold		Swing	▼5.39	

=== Assembly Election 1967 ===
1967 Maharashtra Legislative Assembly election : Akot
Party	Candidate	Votes	%	±%
INC	Gopalrao Bajirao Khedkar	33,827	57.99	▲12.22
ABJS	B. B. Wankhade	21,605	37.03	New
Independent	K. D. Kulkarni	1,635	2.80	New
Independent	V. S. Umarkar	677	1.16	New
Independent	M. K. Sardar	593	1.02	New
Margin of victory		12,222	20.95	▼0.79
Turnout		63,546	75.06	▼1.94
Total valid votes		58,337		
Registered electors		84,663		▲4.45
INC hold		Swing	▲12.22	

=== Assembly Election 1962 ===
1962 Maharashtra Legislative Assembly election : Akot
Party	Candidate	Votes	%	±%
INC	Gopalrao Bajirao Khedkar	26,603	45.77	▼6.77
PWPI	Devidas Moriti Korale	13,967	24.03	New
Independent	Sampatrao Bhaoji Bhople	12,632	21.73	New
ABJS	Anant Mahadeo Asarkar	4,382	7.54	New
Margin of victory		12,636	21.74	▼15.08
Turnout		62,410	77.00	▲6.12
Total valid votes		58,120		
Registered electors		81,056		▲11.88
INC hold		Swing	▼6.77	

=== Assembly Election 1957 ===
1957 Bombay State Legislative Assembly election : Akot
Party	Candidate	Votes	%	±%
INC	Saqui Niyazi Mohammad Subhan	26,980	52.54	▼6.34
SCF	Arakhrao Rambhau Januji	8,071	15.72	New
Independent	Palhade Pandharinath Vithoba	7,549	14.70	New
ABJS	Bodkhe Mahadeo Baliram	5,251	10.23	▲1.21
Independent	Sapkal Ramrao Wamanrao	2,203	4.29	New
Independent	Wankhade Onkar Narsaji	1,299	2.53	New
Margin of victory		18,909	36.82	▼3.95
Turnout		51,353	70.88	▲19.39
Total valid votes		51,353		
Registered electors		72,450		▲60.60
INC hold		Swing	▼6.34	

=== Assembly Election 1952 ===
1952 Hyderabad State Legislative Assembly election : Akot
Party	Candidate	Votes	%	±%
INC	Saqui Niyazi Mohammad Subhan	13,676	58.88	New
Socialist	Ramkrishna Namdeo Adhe	4,207	18.11	New
ABJS	Umedsingh Narayansingh	2,094	9.02	New
Independent	Shamrao Vithoba Boche	1,538	6.62	New
SKP	Chandrabhan Suryabhan Taware	1,268	5.46	New
Independent	Shriram Maroti Gainkar	443	1.91	New
Margin of victory		9,469	40.77	
Turnout		23,226	51.49	
Total valid votes		23,226		
Registered electors		45,112		
INC win (new seat)				

== See also ==
- Telhara
- Akot
- Umara
- Panaj
