= Khallar =

Village in Maharashtra

- village
- Location in Maharashtra, India Khallar (India)
- Coordinates: 21.0402869°N 77.4656296°E
- Daryapur Country India: daryapur India
- State: Maharashtra
- District: Amravati district
- Elevation: 294 m (965 ft)

Languages
  - Official: Marathi
- Time zone: UTC+5:30 (IST)
- ISO 3166 code: MH-IN
- Vehicle registration: MH-27

Khallar is a village in the Daryapur taluka of Amravati district in Amravati division of Vidarbha region of Maharashtra state in India.

There is a police station at the village. Ancestor of Devisingh Ransingh Shekhawat had migrated here from Rajasthan about a century ago.
