= Krishnarao Gulabrao Deshmukh =

Indian politician

Krishnarao Deshmukh

Member of Parliament
- In office 1967–1977
- Preceded by: Vimal Panjabrao Deshmukh
- Succeeded by: Nanasaheb Bonde
- Constituency: Amravati

Member of Parliament
- In office 1957–1962
- Constituency: Ramtek

Personal details
- Born: 8 March 1922 Takarkheda, Maharashtra
- Died: 24 October 1992 (aged 70)
- Party: Indian National Congress
- Children: 2 sons, 4 daughters
- Education: Law college Nagpur
- Profession: Advocate

Krishnarao Gulabrao Deshmukh (8 March 1922 – 24 October 1992) was an Indian politician who was a member of the 1st, 4th and 5th Lok Sabha of India from the Amravati constituency of Maharashtra, and a member of 2nd Lok Sabha from Ramtek. He was a member of the Indian National Congress.

Krishnarao Deshmukh studied at Hislop College and College of Law at Nagpur. He was married to Ashadevi and had two sons and 4 daughters and resides at Amravati. He worked in various capacities in Vidarbha Pradesh, including the Congress Committee, Maharashtra Pradesh Congress Committee and the A.I.C.C.

Krishnarao Deshmukh died on 24 October 1992, at the age of 70.
