= Sudam Deshmukh =

Indian politician

Member of Parliament, Lok Sabha
- In office 1989–1991
- Preceded by: Usha Choudhari
- Succeeded by: Pratibha Patil
- Constituency: Amravati, Maharashtra

Personal details
- Born: 30 April 1923 Donada, Bombay Presidency, British India
- Died: 15 May 1993 (aged 70)
- Party: Communist Party of India

Sudam Deshmukh (30 April 1923 – 15 May 1993) was an Indian politician. He was elected to the Lok Sabha, the lower house of the Parliament of India as a member of the Communist Party of India.
