= Daryapur Assembly constituency =

Constituency of the Maharashtra legislative assembly in India

Coordinates: 20.92°N 77.33°E

Daryapur
- Constituency No. 40 for the Maharashtra Legislative Assembly

Constituency details
- Country: India
- Region: Western India
- State: Maharashtra
- District: Amravati
- Lok Sabha constituency: Amravati
- Established: 1952
- Total electors: 309,345
- Reservation: SC

Member of Legislative Assembly
- 15th Maharashtra Legislative Assembly
- Incumbent Gajanan Lawate
- Party: SS(UBT)
- Alliance: MVA
- Elected year: 2024

Daryapur Assembly constituency is one of the 288 constituencies of Maharashtra Vidhan Sabha and one of the eight which are located in Amravati district. It is reserved for Scheduled Caste candidates.

It is a part of the Amravati (Lok Sabha constituency) along with five other Vidhan Sabha assembly constituencies, viz. Badnera, Amravati, Teosa, Melghat (ST) and Achalpur.

The remaining two Dhamangaon Railway and Morshi constituencies are part of the Wardha (Lok Sabha constituency) in the adjoining Wardha district.

As per orders of Delimitation of Parliamentary and Assembly constituencies Order, 2008, No. 40 Daryapur Assembly constituency is composed of the following: 1. Daryapur Tehsil, 2. Anjangaon Surji Tehsil 3. Achalpur Tehsil (Part), Revenue Circle Rasegaon of the district.

== Members of the Legislative Assembly ==
| Year | Member | Party |
|---|---|---|
| 1952 | Khandare Kisanrao Narayan; Kokilabai Gawande Jagannath Patil | Indian National Congress |
| 1957 | Narayanrao Uttamrao Deshmukh; Khandare Kisanrao Narayan (Sc) | Indian National Congress |
| 1962 | Jagannath Deorao Patil | Republican Party of India |
| 1967 | Narayanrao Uttamrao Deshmukh | Indian National Congress |
| 1972 | Kokilabai Gawande Jagannath Patil | Indian National Congress |
| 1978 | Bobde Shanarrao Krishana Rao | All India Forward Bloc |
| 1980 | Bobde Shanarrao Krishana Rao | Indian National Congress |
| 1985 | Raosaheb Pandurang Hadole | Indian National Congress |
| 1990 | Prakash Gunvantrao Bharsakale | Shiv Sena |
| 1995 | Prakash Gunvantrao Bharsakale | Shiv Sena |
| 1999 | Prakash Gunvantrao Bharsakale | Shiv Sena |
| 2004 | Prakash Gunvantrao Bharsakale | Shiv Sena |
| 2006 By-election | Prakash Gunvantrao Bharsakale | Indian National Congress |
| 2009 | Abhijit Adsul | Shiv Sena |
| 2014 | Ramesh Ganpatrao Bundile | Bharatiya Janata Party |
| 2019 | Balwant Baswant Wankhade | Indian National Congress |
| 2024 | Gajanan Lawate | Shiv Sena (UBT) |

== Election results ==
=== Assembly Election 2024 ===
2024 Maharashtra Legislative Assembly election : Daryapur
| Party | Candidate | Votes | % | ±% |
|---|---|---|---|---|
| SS(UBT) | Gajanan Lawate | 87,749 | 42.28% | New |
| RYSP | Ramesh Ganpatrao Bundile | 68,040 | 32.78% | New |
| SS | Abhijit Adsul | 23,632 | 11.39% | New |
| VBA | Ankush Sahebrao Wakpanjar | 21,263 | 10.24% | ▲7.80 |
| PHJSP | Arun Motiramji Wankhade | 1,877 | 0.90% | New |
| BSP | Prof. Nagorao Wamanrao Hambarde | 1,274 | 0.61% | ▲0.13 |
| NOTA | None of the Above | 1,003 | 0.48% | ▼0.24 |
| Margin of victory | | 19,709 | 9.50% | ▼6.65 |
| Turnout | | 208,550 | 67.42% | ▲3.59 |
| Total valid votes | | 207,547 | | |
| Registered electors | | 309,345 | | ▲3.95 |
| SS(UBT) gain from INC | | Swing | ▼8.46 | |

=== Assembly Election 2019 ===
2019 Maharashtra Legislative Assembly election : Daryapur
| Party | Candidate | Votes | % | ±% |
|---|---|---|---|---|
| INC | Balwant Baswant Wankhade | 95,889 | 50.74% | ▲43.90 |
| BJP | Ramesh Ganpatrao Bundile | 65,370 | 34.59% | ▼0.71 |
| Independent | Seema Sawale | 18,429 | 9.75% | New |
| VBA | Wakpanjar Rekha Sahebrao | 4,612 | 2.44% | New |
| RPI | Adv. Santosh Gonduji Kolhe | 1,482 | 0.78% | ▼23.75 |
| NOTA | None of the Above | 1,376 | 0.73% | ▲0.30 |
| Margin of victory | | 30,519 | 16.15% | ▲5.39 |
| Turnout | | 190,358 | 63.97% | ▼1.13 |
| Total valid votes | | 188,970 | | |
| Registered electors | | 297,583 | | ▲5.71 |
| INC gain from BJP | | Swing | ▲15.44 | |

=== Assembly Election 2014 ===
2014 Maharashtra Legislative Assembly election : Daryapur
| Party | Candidate | Votes | % | ±% |
|---|---|---|---|---|
| BJP | Ramesh Ganpatrao Bundile | 64,224 | 35.30% | New |
| RPI | Balwant Baswant Wankhade | 44,642 | 24.54% | ▲11.06 |
| SS | Abhijit Adsul | 32,256 | 17.73% | ▼9.29 |
| NCP | Dinesh Ganeshdas Boob | 14,671 | 8.06% | New |
| INC | Siddharth Pandurang Wankhade | 12,455 | 6.85% | New |
| MNS | Chandan Gopalkrushna Ramkrushna | 5,445 | 2.99% | ▼6.23 |
| BBM | Ujwala Rahul Athawale | 1,954 | 1.07% | ▼5.99 |
| NOTA | None of the Above | 783 | 0.43% | New |
| Margin of victory | | 19,582 | 10.76% | ▲1.01 |
| Turnout | | 182,884 | 64.96% | ▲6.01 |
| Total valid votes | | 181,942 | | |
| Registered electors | | 281,520 | | ▲9.78 |
| BJP gain from SS | | Swing | ▲8.29 | |

=== Assembly Election 2009 ===
2009 Maharashtra Legislative Assembly election : Daryapur
| Party | Candidate | Votes | % | ±% |
|---|---|---|---|---|
| SS | Abhijit Adsul | 40,606 | 27.01% | ▼7.88 |
| Independent | Balwant Baswant Wankhade | 25,948 | 17.26% | New |
| RPI | Abhyankar Rameshwar Mahadeorao | 20,263 | 13.48% | New |
| MNS | Gopal Ramkrushna Chandan | 13,857 | 9.22% | New |
| Independent | Avinash Krushnarao Gaigole | 12,904 | 8.58% | New |
| BBM | Abhyankar Jagnnath Motiram | 10,620 | 7.07% | ▼9.27 |
| Shivrajya Party | Madhukar Baliram Sonone | 4,288 | 2.85% | New |
| Margin of victory | | 14,658 | 9.75% | ▲5.61 |
| Turnout | | 150,393 | 58.65% | ▼5.97 |
| Total valid votes | | 150,314 | | |
| Registered electors | | 256,444 | | ▲40.82 |
| SS gain from INC | | Swing | ▼12.02 | |

=== Assembly By-election 2006 ===
2006 Maharashtra Legislative Assembly by-election : Daryapur
| Party | Candidate | Votes | % | ±% |
|---|---|---|---|---|
| INC | Prakash Gunvantrao Bharsakale | 45,908 | 39.03% | New |
| SS | Balasaheb Hingnikar | 41,042 | 34.90% | ▼7.33 |
| BBM | Wath Pundlikrao Narayanrao | 19,217 | 16.34% | ▲13.88 |
| Independent | Kanchanmala Kuldeep Gawande | 4,597 | 3.91% | New |
| Independent | Wanchade Deorao Gonduji | 1,913 | 1.63% | New |
| Independent | Vijay Yashwantrao Vilhekar | 1,197 | 1.02% | New |
| Independent | Mirza Zahedbaig Mirza Rahemttwlla Baig | 937 | 0.80% | New |
| Margin of victory | | 4,866 | 4.14% | ▼15.10 |
| Turnout | | 117,613 | 64.59% | ▼5.04 |
| Total valid votes | | 117,613 | | |
| Registered electors | | 182,104 | | ▲0.39 |
| INC gain from SS | | Swing | ▼3.19 | |

=== Assembly Election 2004 ===
2004 Maharashtra Legislative Assembly election : Daryapur
| Party | Candidate | Votes | % | ±% |
|---|---|---|---|---|
| SS | Prakash Gunvantrao Bharsakale | 53,329 | 42.23% | ▲3.56 |
| Independent | Arun Tryambakrao Gawande | 29,029 | 22.98% | New |
| Independent | Zade Madan Babanrao | 16,771 | 13.28% | New |
| RPI | Devidas Zamaji Wakpanzar | 12,147 | 9.62% | New |
| BSP | Pravin Digambar Petkar | 5,179 | 4.10% | ▲3.78 |
| BBM | Sanjay Sukhadeorao Chaurpagar | 3,101 | 2.46% | ▼18.44 |
| LJP | Natthu Jairam Paighan | 2,596 | 2.06% | New |
| Margin of victory | | 24,300 | 19.24% | ▲6.86 |
| Turnout | | 126,324 | 69.64% | ▲5.12 |
| Total valid votes | | 126,297 | | |
| Registered electors | | 181,395 | | ▲14.47 |
| SS hold | | Swing | ▲3.56 | |

=== Assembly Election 1999 ===
1999 Maharashtra Legislative Assembly election : Daryapur
| Party | Candidate | Votes | % | ±% |
|---|---|---|---|---|
| SS | Prakash Gunvantrao Bharsakale | 39,517 | 38.66% | ▲1.18 |
| INC | Madan Patil Gawande | 26,863 | 26.28% | ▲10.64 |
| BBM | Sahebrao Shriram Lendhe | 21,355 | 20.89% | ▼6.72 |
| NCP | Gunwant Vishnupant Sabale | 9,518 | 9.31% | New |
| Independent | Bhave Suresh Namdeorao | 4,459 | 4.36% | New |
| Margin of victory | | 12,654 | 12.38% | ▲2.51 |
| Turnout | | 107,265 | 67.69% | ▼10.66 |
| Total valid votes | | 102,212 | | |
| Registered electors | | 158,462 | | ▲0.61 |
| SS hold | | Swing | ▲1.18 | |

=== Assembly Election 1995 ===
1995 Maharashtra Legislative Assembly election : Daryapur
| Party | Candidate | Votes | % | ±% |
|---|---|---|---|---|
| SS | Prakash Gunvantrao Bharsakale | 44,377 | 37.48% | ▲10.28 |
| BBM | Lendhey Sahebrao Shriram | 32,691 | 27.61% | New |
| INC | Hadole Raosaheb Pandurangji | 18,514 | 15.64% | ▲3.04 |
| Independent | Gaharwar Ashosinh Laxmansinh | 9,147 | 7.73% | New |
| Independent | Gawande Ashok Mahadeo | 6,005 | 5.07% | New |
| Independent | Gawai Rajkumar Laxman | 960 | 0.81% | New |
| Independent | Sk. Yusuf Sk. Umar | 899 | 0.76% | New |
| Margin of victory | | 11,686 | 9.87% | ▲0.67 |
| Turnout | | 120,013 | 76.20% | ▲7.88 |
| Total valid votes | | 118,388 | | |
| Registered electors | | 157,503 | | ▲12.25 |
| SS hold | | Swing | ▲10.28 | |

=== Assembly Election 1990 ===
1990 Maharashtra Legislative Assembly election : Daryapur
| Party | Candidate | Votes | % | ±% |
|---|---|---|---|---|
| SS | Prakash Gunvantrao Bharsakale | 25,682 | 27.20% | New |
| BRP | Deorao Gondaji Wankhade | 16,996 | 18.00% | New |
| Independent | Raosabeb Pandurang Hadole | 13,260 | 14.04% | New |
| INC | Bhausaheb Alias Haribhau Govindrao Barabde | 11,897 | 12.60% | ▼25.90 |
| JD | Arvind Narayan Nalkande | 10,847 | 11.49% | New |
| Independent | A. Kadir Sk. Nazir | 7,253 | 7.68% | New |
| Independent | Malmegh Dadasabeb Alias Wasudeo Motiramji | 2,613 | 2.77% | New |
| Margin of victory | | 8,686 | 9.20% | ▲6.04 |
| Turnout | | 95,553 | 68.10% | ▲0.95 |
| Total valid votes | | 94,416 | | |
| Registered electors | | 140,314 | | ▲27.80 |
| SS gain from INC | | Swing | ▼11.30 | |

=== Assembly Election 1985 ===
1985 Maharashtra Legislative Assembly election : Daryapur
| Party | Candidate | Votes | % | ±% |
|---|---|---|---|---|
| INC | Raosaheb Pandurang Hadole | 28,043 | 38.50% | New |
| IC(S) | Ashoksinha Laxmansinha Gaharwar | 25,742 | 35.34% | New |
| Independent | Wankhade Deorao Gondaji | 10,212 | 14.02% | New |
| Independent | Berad Suresh Rajaram | 3,589 | 4.93% | New |
| RPI | Devidas Zyamaji Wakpanjar | 3,301 | 4.53% | ▼11.43 |
| Independent | Sureshrao Ramkrushna Khedkar | 1,423 | 1.95% | New |
| Margin of victory | | 2,301 | 3.16% | ▼12.67 |
| Turnout | | 73,791 | 67.21% | ▲13.03 |
| Total valid votes | | 72,832 | | |
| Registered electors | | 109,792 | | ▲7.43 |
| INC gain from INC(I) | | Swing | ▼11.43 | |

=== Assembly Election 1980 ===
1980 Maharashtra Legislative Assembly election : Daryapur
| Party | Candidate | Votes | % | ±% |
|---|---|---|---|---|
| INC(I) | Bobde Shanarrao Krishana Rao | 27,207 | 49.94% | New |
| PWPI | Hutke Ramrao Sheshrao | 18,581 | 34.10% | ▲20.29 |
| RPI | Abhyankar Madhukar Sukhdeo | 8,694 | 15.96% | ▼1.45 |
| Margin of victory | | 8,626 | 15.83% | ▼18.96 |
| Turnout | | 55,322 | 54.13% | ▼23.34 |
| Total valid votes | | 54,482 | | |
| Registered electors | | 102,198 | | ▲7.54 |
| INC(I) gain from AIFB | | Swing | ▼2.26 | |

=== Assembly Election 1978 ===
1978 Maharashtra Legislative Assembly election : Daryapur
| Party | Candidate | Votes | % | ±% |
|---|---|---|---|---|
| AIFB | Bobde Shanarrao Krishana Rao | 38,021 | 52.19% | New |
| RPI | Gawai Vasantrao Suryabhanji | 12,678 | 17.40% | ▼8.94 |
| PWPI | Hutke Ramrao Sheshrao | 10,060 | 13.81% | New |
| JP | Zombade Shankar Sadashiv | 9,456 | 12.98% | New |
| Independent | Pakhare Mohan Maroti | 817 | 1.12% | New |
| Independent | Gulhane Ramdas Bisansa | 720 | 0.99% | New |
| RPI(K) | Patil Krishnarao Trimbakrao | 344 | 0.47% | ▼0.97 |
| Margin of victory | | 25,343 | 34.79% | ▼11.08 |
| Turnout | | 74,476 | 78.37% | ▲3.12 |
| Total valid votes | | 72,845 | | |
| Registered electors | | 95,030 | | ▲0.91 |
| AIFB gain from INC | | Swing | ▼20.02 | |

=== Assembly Election 1972 ===
1972 Maharashtra Legislative Assembly election : Daryapur
| Party | Candidate | Votes | % | ±% |
|---|---|---|---|---|
| INC | Kokila Jagannath Patil | 50,010 | 72.21% | ▲21.41 |
| RPI | Gajanan Dewaji Nannaware | 18,246 | 26.35% | ▼22.3 |
| RPI(K) | Banduji Akaram Gawai | 996 | 1.44% | New |
| Margin of victory | | 31,764 | 45.87% | ▲43.71 |
| Turnout | | 70,733 | 75.11% | ▼4.60 |
| Total valid votes | | 69,252 | | |
| Registered electors | | 94,170 | | ▲8.46 |
| INC hold | | Swing | ▲21.41 | |

=== Assembly Election 1967 ===
1967 Maharashtra Legislative Assembly election : Daryapur
| Party | Candidate | Votes | % | ±% |
|---|---|---|---|---|
| INC | Narayanrao Uttamrao Deshmukh | 34,467 | 50.80% | ▲8.07 |
| RPI | Jagannath Deorao Patil | 33,002 | 48.64% | ▼5.91 |
| ABJS | A. P. Madghe | 374 | 0.55% | New |
| Margin of victory | | 1,465 | 2.16% | ▼9.66 |
| Turnout | | 70,420 | 81.10% | ▼4.94 |
| Total valid votes | | 67,843 | | |
| Registered electors | | 86,827 | | ▲22.28 |
| INC gain from RPI | | Swing | ▼3.75 | |

=== Assembly Election 1962 ===
1962 Maharashtra Legislative Assembly election : Daryapur
| Party | Candidate | Votes | % | ±% |
|---|---|---|---|---|
| RPI | Jagannath Deorao Patil | 32,181 | 54.55% | New |
| INC | Narayanrao Uttamrao Deshmukh | 25,208 | 42.73% | ▲16.41 |
| Independent | Gulabrao Chandrabhanji Jawanjale | 1,143 | 1.94% | New |
| Independent | Jagdev Sonaji Chourpagar | 457 | 0.77% | New |
| Margin of victory | | 6,973 | 11.82% | ▲10.82 |
| Turnout | | 61,281 | 86.30% | ▼46.14 |
| Total valid votes | | 58,989 | | |
| Registered electors | | 71,008 | | ▼44.43 |
| RPI gain from INC | | Swing | ▲28.23 | |

=== Assembly Election 1957 ===
1957 Bombay State Legislative Assembly election : Daryapur
| Party | Candidate | Votes | % | ±% |
|---|---|---|---|---|
| INC | Deshmukh Narayan Uttarmrao | 43,465 | 26.32% | ▼4.44 |
| INC | Khandare Kisanrao Narayan (Sc) | 41,807 | 25.32% | ▼5.45 |
| Independent | Patil Bhimrao Yadeorao | 37,151 | 22.50% | New |
| SCF | Khandare Yeshwantrao Bapuji (Sc) | 31,673 | 19.18% | ▲6.96 |
| PSP | Gorde Motiram Laxman | 11,017 | 6.67% | New |
| Margin of victory | | 1,658 | 1.00% | ▼0.33 |
| Turnout | | 165,113 | 129.21% | ▲18.10 |
| Total valid votes | | 165,113 | | |
| Registered electors | | 127,782 | | ▲32.63 |
| INC hold | | Swing | ▼4.44 | |

=== Assembly Election 1952 ===
1952 Madhya Pradesh Legislative Assembly election : Daryapur
| Party | Candidate | Votes | % | ±% |
|---|---|---|---|---|
| INC | Kisan Narayan Khandare | 32,937 | 30.77% | New |
| INC | Kokilabai Gawande | 31,510 | 29.43% | New |
| SCF | Yeswantrao Bapuji Khandare | 13,081 | 12.22% | New |
| Independent | Parshramsing Kannusing | 10,427 | 9.74% | New |
| Independent | Haribahu Sitaram Chaukhande | 6,093 | 5.69% | New |
| Independent | Mahadeo Wailaji Chopde | 3,429 | 3.20% | New |
| ABJS | Gunwantrao Arjun Taides | 2,885 | 2.69% | New |
| Margin of victory | | 18,429 | | New |
| Turnout | | 107,056 | 111.12% | |
| Total valid votes | | 107,056 | | |
| Registered electors | | 96,347 | | |
| INC win (new seat) | | | | |
