= Badnera Assembly constituency =

Constituency of the Maharashtra legislative assembly in India

Coordinates: 20°51′25.95″N 77°43′42.29″E

Badnera
- Constituency No. 37 for the Maharashtra Legislative Assembly

Constituency details
- Country: India
- Region: Western India
- State: Maharashtra
- District: Amravati
- Lok Sabha constituency: Amravati
- Established: 1957
- Total electors: 364,110
- Reservation: None

Member of Legislative Assembly
- 15th Maharashtra Legislative Assembly
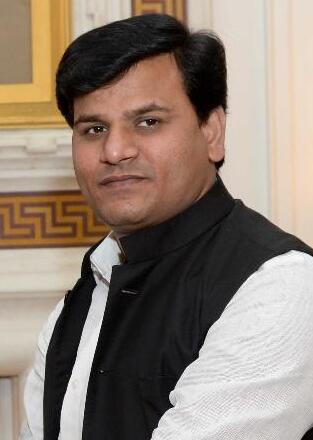
- Incumbent Ravi Rana
- Party: RYSP
- Alliance: NDA
- Elected year: 2024

Badnera Assembly constituency is one of the 288 constituencies of Maharashtra Vidhan Sabha and one of the eight which are located in Amravati district.

It is a part of the Amravati (Lok Sabha constituency) along with five other Vidhan Sabha assembly constituencies, viz. Amravati, Teosa, Daryapur (SC), Melghat (ST) and Achalpur.

The remaining two Dhamangaon Railway and Morshi constituencies are part of the Wardha (Lok Sabha constituency) in the adjoining Wardha district.

As per orders of Delimitation of Parliamentary and Assembly constituencies Order, 2008, No. 37 Badnera Assembly constituency is composed of the following: 1. Amravati Tehsil (Part), Revenue Circle – Amravati and Badnera, 2. Amravati (M.Corp.)–Ward No. 6 to 18, 32 to 40, 57 to 61, 72,73, 3. Bhatkuli Tehsil (Part), Revenue Circle – Bhatkuli and Nimbha. of the district.

== Members of the Legislative Assembly ==
Year	Member	Party
1957	Purushottam K. Deshmukh	Indian National Congress
1962	Purushottam K. Deshmukh	Indian National Congress
1967	Krishnrao Shrungare	Republican Party of India
1972	Purushottam K. Deshmukh	Indian National Congress
1978	Mangaldas Yadav	Indian National Congress (I)
1980	Ram Meghe	Indian National Congress (I)
1985	Ram Meghe	Indian National Congress
1990	Pradeep Wadnere	Shiv Sena
1995	Dnyaneshwar Dhane Patil	Shiv Sena
1999	Dnyaneshwar Dhane Patil	Shiv Sena
2004	Sulbha Khodke	Nationalist Congress Party
2009	Ravi Rana	Independent
2014	Ravi Rana	Independent
2019	Ravi Rana	Independent
2024	Ravi Rana	Rashtriya Yuva Swabhiman Party

== Election results ==
=== Assembly Election 2024 ===
2024 Maharashtra Legislative Assembly election : Badnera
Party	Candidate	Votes	%	±%
RYSP	Ravi Rana	127,800	60.34%	New
NCP	Band Priti Sanjay	60,826	28.72%	New
SS(UBT)	Kharate Sunil Baldeorao	7,121	3.36%	New
BSP	Ramesh Pandurang Nagdive	3,502	1.65%	▼0.19
Independent	Tushar Panditrao Bhartiya	3,337	1.58%	New
VBA	Leena Ghanshyam Dhole	1,672	0.79%	▼3.64
Independent	Prashant Panjabrao Jadhav	1,309	0.62%	New
NOTA	None of the Above	692	0.33%	▼0.39
Margin of victory		66,974	31.62%	▲23.23
Turnout		212,501	58.36%	▲6.09
Total valid votes		211,809		
Registered electors		364,110		▲2.31
RYSP hold		Swing	▲11.53	

=== Assembly Election 2019 ===
2019 Maharashtra Legislative Assembly election : Badnera
Party	Candidate	Votes	%	±%
Independent	Ravi Rana	90,460	48.81%	New
SS	Band Priti Sanjay	74,919	40.42%	▲18.27
VBA	Pramod Yashwantrao Ingale	8,205	4.43%	New
Independent	Sheela Santosh Meshram	3,740	2.02%	New
BSP	Adv. Vilas Devidas Gawande	3,419	1.84%	▼5.27
NOTA	None of the Above	1,329	0.72%	▼0.14
Margin of victory		15,541	8.39%	▲4.21
Turnout		186,850	52.50%	▼4.81
Total valid votes		185,336		
Registered electors		355,888		▲13.82
Independent hold		Swing	▲22.48	

=== Assembly Election 2014 ===
2014 Maharashtra Legislative Assembly election : Badnera
Party	Candidate	Votes	%	±%
Independent	Ravi Rana	46,827	26.32%	New
SS	Band Sanjay Raosaheb	39,408	22.15%	▲10.85
INC	Sulbha Sanjay Khodke	33,897	19.06%	New
BJP	Bhartiya Tushar Panditrao	31,455	17.68%	New
BSP	Ravi Bhauraoji Vaidhya	12,663	7.12%	▲4.41
Independent	Adatiya Vinesh Jayantial	9,786	5.50%	New
NOTA	None of the Above	1,522	0.86%	New
Margin of victory		7,419	4.17%	▼7.90
Turnout		179,655	57.46%	▲0.34
Total valid votes		177,881		
Registered electors		312,684		▲13.67
Independent hold		Swing	▼20.63	

=== Assembly Election 2009 ===
2009 Maharashtra Legislative Assembly election : Badnera
Party	Candidate	Votes	%	±%
Independent	Ravi Rana	73,031	46.95%	New
NCP	Sulbha Sanjay Khodke	54,260	34.88%	▼1.99
SS	Sudhir Narayanrao Suryawanshi	17,582	11.30%	▼21.71
BSP	Adv.Manish Madhukarrao Sawalakhe	4,209	2.71%	▼12.90
BBM	Athawaley Sanjay Hiramanji	1,433	0.92%	▼8.39
Margin of victory		18,771	12.07%	▲8.21
Turnout		155,604	56.57%	▼5.92
Total valid votes		155,543		
Registered electors		275,076		▲15.23
Independent gain from NCP		Swing	▲10.07	

=== Assembly Election 2004 ===
2004 Maharashtra Legislative Assembly election : Badnera
Party	Candidate	Votes	%	±%
NCP	Sulbha Sanjay Khodke	54,995	36.88%	▲23.59
SS	Dyaneshwar Dhane Patil	49,236	33.02%	▼7.46
BSP	Pramod Damodar Tarhekar	23,266	15.60%	▲14.67
BBM	Baba Rathod	13,889	9.31%	▲2.20
Independent	Ramdas Vishwanath Junghare	2,063	1.38%	New
Independent	Mahore Satish Vitthalrao	1,264	0.85%	New
Independent	Gunwant Jaguji Garode	1,169	0.78%	New
Margin of victory		5,759	3.86%	▼6.29
Turnout		149,241	62.52%	▲6.84
Total valid votes		149,129		
Registered electors		238,727		▲16.67
NCP gain from SS		Swing	▼3.60	

=== Assembly Election 1999 ===
1999 Maharashtra Legislative Assembly election : Badnera
Party	Candidate	Votes	%	±%
SS	Dnyaneshwar Dhane Patil	46,079	40.48%	▲13.51
INC	Baba Alias Pratapsingh Dhanpat Rathod	34,523	30.33%	▲22.20
NCP	Prof. Kale Pramod Manikrao	15,122	13.28%	New
BBM	Dudhe Vinayak Tukaram	8,098	7.11%	▼11.36
CPI	Tukaram Janglaji Bhasme	5,372	4.72%	New
Independent	Nitin Nagorao Mohod	2,522	2.22%	New
BSP	Prof. Pawar Ramesh Balaji	1,056	0.93%	New
Margin of victory		11,556	10.15%	▲1.66
Turnout		119,421	58.36%	▼13.17
Total valid votes		113,831		
Registered electors		204,622		▲5.87
SS hold		Swing	▲13.51	

=== Assembly Election 1995 ===
1995 Maharashtra Legislative Assembly election : Badnera
Party	Candidate	Votes	%	±%
SS	Dhane Dnyaneshwar Mahadeo	35,862	26.97%	▼2.80
BBM	Vinayak Tukaramji Dudhe	24,565	18.48%	New
INC	Choudhari Usha Prakash	10,807	8.13%	New
Independent	Inzalkar Prakash Ramhari	8,920	6.71%	New
Independent	Dhepe Pravin Panjabrao	7,795	5.86%	New
JD	Ingole Charandas Pairuji	4,912	3.69%	▼10.07
Independent	Bagade Gangaram Vanduji	3,991	3.00%	New
Margin of victory		11,297	8.50%	▼5.46
Turnout		135,059	69.88%	▲11.62
Total valid votes		132,960		
Registered electors		193,270		▲25.45
SS hold		Swing	▼2.80	

=== Assembly Election 1990 ===
1990 Maharashtra Legislative Assembly election : Badnera
Party	Candidate	Votes	%	±%
SS	Wadnere Pradeep Babanrao	26,224	29.77%	New
Independent	Yate Purushottam Vishnupant	13,929	15.81%	New
JD	Inzalkar Prakash Ramhari	12,125	13.77%	New
BRP	Purushottamdas Kisanlal Bagdi	11,710	13.29%	New
Independent	Gondane Anil Balkrishna	6,826	7.75%	New
Independent	Rangacharya Shrikrishna Pundlik	4,560	5.18%	New
Independent	Jawanjal Madhukar Wamanrao	3,026	3.44%	New
Margin of victory		12,295	13.96%	▼0.44
Turnout		89,276	57.95%	▲4.05
Total valid votes		88,081		
Registered electors		154,064		▲33.92
SS gain from INC		Swing	▼15.02	

=== Assembly Election 1985 ===
1985 Maharashtra Legislative Assembly election : Badnera
Party	Candidate	Votes	%	±%
INC	Meghe Ram Krushnarao	27,374	44.79%	New
IC(S)	Gawande Arun Vithalrao	18,573	30.39%	New
Independent	Anandrao Hiraman Ingale	10,974	17.96%	New
RPI	Bansod Nemichand Maroti	3,431	5.61%	New
Margin of victory		8,801	14.40%	▼20.94
Turnout		61,987	53.88%	▲4.46
Total valid votes		61,118		
Registered electors		115,043		▲11.51
INC gain from INC(I)		Swing	▼7.75	

=== Assembly Election 1980 ===
1980 Maharashtra Legislative Assembly election : Badnera
Party	Candidate	Votes	%	±%
INC(I)	Meghe Ram Krushnarao	26,380	52.53%	▼6.33
INC(U)	Tikhile Ramdas Champatrao	8,632	17.19%	New
Independent	Gudadhe Kisan Marotirao	7,272	14.48%	New
BJP	Riyaj Ahamad M. Yusuf	4,698	9.36%	New
Independent	Yadao Mangaldas Bholaram	3,008	5.99%	New
Margin of victory		17,748	35.34%	▼6.35
Turnout		51,191	49.62%	▼23.05
Total valid votes		50,215		
Registered electors		103,172		▲6.69
INC(I) hold		Swing	▼6.33	

=== Assembly Election 1978 ===
1978 Maharashtra Legislative Assembly election : Badnera
Party	Candidate	Votes	%	±%
INC(I)	Yadao Mangaldas Bholaram	40,828	58.87%	New
Independent	Dhepe Pravin Panjab	11,908	17.17%	New
RPI(K)	Nannaware Gajanan Dewaji	7,999	11.53%	▲9.12
CPI	Diwanji Bhalchandra Krushnarao	4,614	6.65%	▼4.25
RPI	Shrungare Krishnarao Bhanuji	2,643	3.81%	▼14.11
Independent	Dharia J. M.	591	0.85%	New
Independent	Khandare Yeshwantrao Bapuji	587	0.85%	New
Margin of victory		28,920	41.70%	▼2.48
Turnout		70,964	73.39%	▲2.99
Total valid votes		69,356		
Registered electors		96,699		▼0.89
INC(I) gain from INC		Swing	▼3.23	

=== Assembly Election 1972 ===
1972 Maharashtra Legislative Assembly election : Badnera
Party	Candidate	Votes	%	±%
INC	Purushottam K. Deshmukh	41,649	62.10%	▲23.66
RPI	Krishn Rao B. Shrunngare	12,019	17.92%	▼34.93
CPI	Dattatraya T. Chaudhari	7,313	10.90%	New
Independent	Nilkanth Makaram Gajbhiye	1,674	2.50%	New
RPI(K)	Sukhdeo Fagoji Tidke	1,620	2.42%	New
Independent	Waghamare Sudam Akaji	1,273	1.90%	New
ABJS	Yadao Sitaram Wath	1,233	1.84%	▼3.12
Margin of victory		29,630	44.18%	▲29.77
Turnout		68,862	70.58%	▲1.19
Total valid votes		67,066		
Registered electors		97,570		▲9.73
INC gain from RPI		Swing	▲9.25	

=== Assembly Election 1967 ===
1967 Maharashtra Legislative Assembly election : Badnera
Party	Candidate	Votes	%	±%
RPI	Krishn Rao B. Shrunngare	31,744	52.85%	▲22.03
INC	Purushottam K. Deshmukh	23,091	38.44%	▼2.2
ABJS	P. G. Deo	2,977	4.96%	▲0.74
Independent	Y. B. Khandare	1,902	3.17%	New
Margin of victory		8,653	14.41%	▲4.58
Turnout		63,873	71.83%	▲3.34
Total valid votes		60,065		
Registered electors		88,921		▲10.37
RPI gain from INC		Swing	▲12.21	

=== Assembly Election 1962 ===
1962 Maharashtra Legislative Assembly election : Badnera
Party	Candidate	Votes	%	±%
INC	Purushottam K. Deshmukh	21,025	40.64%	▼9.84
RPI	Sukhadeorao Phagoji Tidke	15,941	30.82%	New
Independent	Pundlikrao Suryabhan Epukar	7,855	15.18%	New
Independent	Jaikumar Motisa Saharkar	2,783	5.38%	New
ABJS	Shriram Ramdas Umekar	2,181	4.22%	New
Independent	N. K. Gharjare	1,262	2.44%	New
Margin of victory		5,084	9.83%	▼10.44
Turnout		55,645	69.07%	▼9.53
Total valid votes		51,731		
Registered electors		80,567		▲9.68
INC hold		Swing	▼9.84	

=== Assembly Election 1957 ===
1957 Bombay State Legislative Assembly election : Badnera
Party	Candidate	Votes	%	±%
INC	Purushottam K. Deshmukh	27,344	50.48%	New
SCF	Tidke Sukdeo Fagoji (Sc)	16,366	30.21%	New
Independent	Patekar Vithalrao Harishchandra	8,855	16.35%	New
RRP	Dole Narayan Ramchandra	1,602	2.96%	New
Margin of victory		10,978	20.27%	
Turnout		54,167	73.74%	
Total valid votes		54,167		
Registered electors		73,454		
INC win (new seat)				

== See also ==
- Badnera
