= Usha Choudhari =

Indian politician

Usha Prakash Choudhari (born 1942) is an Indian National Congress politician and two-times MP from Amravati. Around hundred of her poems have been published.

== Early life ==
Usha was born 22 February 1942 in Amravati and after completing her school education, attended the Shri Shivaji College of Education. She holds master's degrees in Arts and Education.

== Career ==
Choudhari became the chairperson of Amravati District Manila Cooperative Bank in 1975. She won the 1980 Indian general election from Amravati as a candidate of the Indian National Congress. During her first term in the Lok Sabha, she served on the Committee on Government Assurances (1980–82) and Committee of Estimates (1982–84).

The World Development Parliament Institution in Kolkata honoured her with the title of Bharat Samaj Unnyan Ratna in 1984. The same year, she was re-elected to the Lok Sabha. However, she lost to Sudam Deshmukh of the Communist Party of India in the 1989 elections. Choudhari is also a poet and about hundred of her poems have been published in various periodicals.

== Personal life ==
In January 1959, she married Shri Prakash Choudhari from whom she has four children.
