= Prakash Gunvantrao Bharsakale =

Indian politician

Prakash Bharsakale

Member of Maharashtra Legislative Assembly
- Incumbent
- Assumed office (2014–2019), (2019–2024), (2024–Present)
- Preceded by: Sanjay Gawande
- Constituency: Akot
- In office (1990–1995), (1995–1999), (1999–2004), (2004–2006), (2006 – 2009)
- Preceded by: Raosaheb Pandurang Hadole
- Succeeded by: Abhijit Adsul
- Constituency: Daryapur

Personal details
- Born: 20 January 1964 (age 62) Kalyan, Maharashtra, India
- Party: Bharatiya Janata Party (2012–present)
- Other political affiliations: Independent (2009–2012); Indian National Congress (2005–2009); Shivsena (until 2005)
- Spouse: Nalini Bharsakale
- Children: Rupali Bharsakale; Vijay Bharsakale
- Parent: Gunwantrao Bharsakale Patil (father)
- Occupation: Politician

Prakash Gunvantrao Bharsakale is a member of the 14th Maharashtra Legislative Assembly. He represents the Akot Assembly Constituency of Akola district. He belongs to the Bharatiya Janata Party.

== Political career ==
Prakash Bharsakale was a Shivsena worker. He got an opportunity to contest elections in 1990 from Daryapur constituency and he won the election as a Shivsena candidate. Bharsakale resigned from Shivsena in 2005 because Narayan Rane was expelled from the Shivsena. He joined the Indian National Congress along with Narayan Rane and won the by-election held in 2005 as a Congress candidate from Daryapur constituency. In 2009 he left the Congress and contested Akot (Vidhan Sabha constituency) as an independent candidate but lost the election. Prakash Bharsakale joined BJP in 2012. In 2014 he got an opportunity from Akot (Vidhan Sabha constituency) as a BJP candidate and won the election with a large margin of votes against the Congress candidate.

== Daryapur Constituency ==
He served as MLA from 1990 to 2009 from Daryapur-Anjangaon Vidhansabha. Later he contested from Akot Vidhansabha because his constituency is reserved for Scheduled Caste.

== Amravati Loksabha 1991 ==
Prakash Bharsakale contested Amravati Loksabha election in 1991 against a strong Congress women leader and former President of India Pratibha Patil but lost the election. He secured 121784 votes against Pratibha Patil.

== Daryapur constituency by-election ==
In 2005 Bharsakale joined Congress with Narayan Rane and faced by-election. He won the by-election as a Congress candidate against Balasaheb Hingnikar, a Shivsena candidate.
