= Sulbha Khodke =

Indian politician

Sulbha Sanjayrao Khodke

Member of Maharashtra Legislative Assembly
- Incumbent
- Assumed office (2019-2024), (2024-Present)
- Preceded by: Sunil Deshmukh
- Constituency: Amravati
- In office (2004–2009)
- Preceded by: Dnyaneshwar Dhane Patil
- Succeeded by: Ravi Rana
- Constituency: Badnera

Personal details
- Born: Sulbha Sanjay Khodke; 18 September 1963 (age 62) Amravati, Maharashtra
- Party: Nationalist Congress Party (Oct 2024-Present),(2018-2019), (Before 2014)
- Other political affiliations: Indian National Congress (2014-2018), (2019-2024)
- Spouse: Sanjay Khodke
- Children: Sanyukta, Yash
- Occupation: Politician

Sulbha Sanjayrao Khodke is an Indian politician from Maharashtra and a member of the Nationalist Congress Party . She was elected as a member of the Legislative Assembly of Maharashtra from Amravati as an Indian National Congress candidate. She was also the vice-chairman of the Vidarbha Irrigation Development Corporation Ltd. Previously she was member of Legislative Assembly of Maharashtra from Badnera Constituency during 2004 to 2009. Besides she was director and chairman on various government institutions like Maharashtra State Consumer Federation, Mumbai, Maharashtra State Cooperative Banks Federation, Amravati District Central Cooperative Bank Ltd., Amravati Zilla Madhya varti Cooperative Bank Ltd., Shiddhivinay Bachatgat Mahasangh.
