= Ravi Rana =

Indian politician

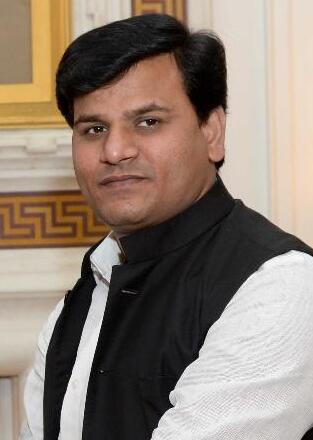
- Rana in 2019

Member of Legislative Assembly, Maharashtra
- Incumbent
- Assumed office 22 October 2009
- Preceded by: Sulbha Sanjay Khodke
- Constituency: Badnera

Personal details
- Born: Ravi Gangadhar Rana; 28 April 1980 (age 46)
- Party: Rashtriya Yuva Swabhiman Party
- Spouse: Navneet Kaur Rana
- Education: Amravati College (B.Com.), Maharashtra

Ravi Gangadhar Rana is an Indian independent politician, and a four-time MLA, presently representing Badnera (Vidhan Sabha constituency) in Amravati District of Vidarbha region in the 13th Maharashtra Legislative Assembly.

== Life and career ==
Rana hails from Shankarnagar, Amravati and was born to Gangadhar Narayan Rana. He completed his SSC in 1996 and HSC in 1998 from Amravati Board. He is a graduate with bachelor of commerce degree in 2000 from Amravati College.

He married former Telugu actress Navneet Kaur in a mass marriage ceremony. This event took place on 3 February 2011 in the presence of many political leaders and VIPs. The then Chief Minister of Maharashtra Prithviraj Chavan and Baba Ramdev, remained present to bless the newly wedded couple in the same event. Navneet later went on to win the elections to become a Member of Parliament.

In 2019, the elections for the Maharashtra Vidhan Sabha, he defeated Shiv Sena candidate Priti Sanjay Band with a margin of 15541 votes and became MLA for the third time in a row. After that, Rana pledged to support the Bharatiya Janata Party unconditionally.

In 2024 elections, he was the Maha Yuti candidate and won for the fourth time in a row.

== Controversy ==
In 2011, he did an indefinite fast in central jail for farmers to get fair price for their products. On 6 October 2015, Rana stopped an encroachment on a single local barber shop.

In April 2020, the Maharashtra police invoked IPC section 188, that is disobedience to order duly promulgated by public servant, against Rana and his aides when they broke the law; removed barricades to reach Irwin Square for paying tributes to B R Ambedkar amid a nationwide punctuated COVID-19 lockdown by the central government. In April 2022, Rana and his wife Navneet were arrested by Mumbai police following their insistence to recite Hanuman Chalisa in front of Matoshree the residence of Maharashtra CM Uddhav Thackeray. Later they were sent to 14 days of judicial custody on the orders of local magistrate. They were granted bail in Hanuman chalisa row on a bond of ₹50,000 and directed not to speak to the media about the case on 4 May 2022. Rana sparked controversy by stating that the Rs 1,500 monthly aid would be withdrawn if beneficiaries did not vote for Maha Yuti.
