= Gajanan Lawate =

Indian politician

Gajanan Motiram Lawate (born 1970) is an Indian politician from Maharashtra. He is an MLA from Daryapur Assembly constituency, which is reserved for Scheduled Caste community, in Amravati district. He won the 2024 Maharashtra Legislative Assembly election representing the Shiv Sena (UBT).

== Early life and education ==
Lawate is from Daryapur, Amravati district, Maharashtra. He is the son of Motiram Fakiraji Lawate. He studied Class 10 and passed the examination conducted by Maharashtra State Board of Secondary and Higher Secondary Education, Pune, in 1989. His wife runs a restaurant.

== Career ==
Lawate won from Daryapur Assembly constituency representing Shiv Sena (UBT) in the 2024 Maharashtra Legislative Assembly election. He polled 87,749 votes and defeated his nearest rival, Ramesh Bundile of the Rashtriya Yuva Swabhiman Party, by a margin of 19,702 votes.
