= Daryapur =

Daryapur Banosa
- City
- Location in Maharashtra, India
- Coordinates: 20.93°N 77.33°E
- Country: India
- State: Maharashtra
- District: Amravati
- Elevation: 288 m (945 ft)

Population (2011)
  - Total: 36,463

Languages
  - Official: Marathi
- Time zone: UTC+5:30 (IST)
- PIN: 444803
- Telephone code: +91(0)7224
- Sex ratio: Nearly Equal ♂/♀

Daryapur is a city located in the Amravati District of Maharashtra State, India. It belongs to the Vidarbha region of the Amravati Division. It is located 52 km (32.31m) west of the District headquarters of Amravati.

== Geography ==
Daryapur is located at 20.9300° N, 77.3300° E and coordinates at an average elevation of 288m .https://www.latlong.net/place/daryapur-maharashtra-india-11715.html

== Demographics ==
According to the 2011 India Census, Daryapur Banosa is a Municipal Council city in the district of Amravati, Vidarbha. The city of Daryapur Banosa is divided into 20 wards in which elections are held every 5 years. The Daryapur Banosa Municipal Council has a population of 36,463 people out of which 18,590 are males while 17,873 are females as per a report released by the 2011 India Census. The population of children aged 0–6 is 10.3% (3769) of total population of Daryapur, Banosa. According to municipal council the female sex ratio is 961 though the state average is 929. Moreover, the child sex ratio is around 866 as compared to Maharashtra state average which is 894. The literacy rate of Daryapur Banosa city is 89.74% higher than the state average of 82.34%. Specifically, male literacy is around 92.68% while the female literacy rate is 86.72%.

Daryapur Banosa Municipal Council accounts to a total administration over 7,625 houses to which it supplies basic amenities like water and electricity. Water supplied to houses come from Shahanur dam which does not require electricity, and works completely on gravitational energy. Daryapur and Anjangaon hold records in the Limca book for supplying water without electricity. It is also authorized to build roads within Municipal Council limits and impose taxes on properties coming under its jurisdiction.

Year	Male	Female	Total Population	Change	Religion (%)							
Year	Male	Female	Total Population	Change	Hindu	Muslim	Christian	Sikhs	Buddhist	Jain	Other religions and persuasions	Religion not stated
2001	17758	16639	34397	-	62.253	25.491	0.195	0.015	11.335	0.424	0.279	0.009
2011	18590	17873	36463	6.006	59.869	28.064	0.222	0.014	11.403	0.373	0.000	0.055

== About ==
Daryapur (Banosa) is a city and a municipal council in Amravati district in the state of Maharashtra, India. Daryapur is situated on the bank of the Chandrabhaga river. The town derives its name from Darya Imad Shah the 3rd imadshahi ruler of Berar sultanate (AD 1526–1560) who founded Daryapur. Daryapur's education includes Prabodhan Vidyalaya Daryapur, Adarsh High School Daryapur and other schools. Daryapur is also a cotton producing town with ginning and pressing factories. It also produces cereals like 'Mung' and 'Chana'. Soybean production in blooming in recent years . Daryapur Municipal Council comprises three separate towns i.e. Daryapur, Banosa and Babhali. Daryapur is the main town where the Municipal Council, ST Bus Stand, and main schools are situated. There is only a narrow-gauge rail line separating Banosa from Daryapur. Babhali and Banosa are separated by the river "Chandrabhaga". Sarvajanik Vachanalaya is a 104-year-old library which was founded in 1912 and is now run by a trust in which (late) Shri. Shridhar Dhondopant Vaidya and Shri Sudhir Bhanudaspant Dharmadhikari struggled hard to set up this Vachanalaya and now Girish Dattatraya Bhadekar is librarian of Sarvajanik Vachanalaya and recipient of "GRANTH MITRA PURASKAR" 2008.

Places of interest in and around Daryapur include:

- The Cotton Mill
- Kolhapuri Gate
- Asha-Manisha Temple
- Anandeshwar Mahadev Temple at Lasur
- Sant Gadge Baba Temple
- Parashram Maharaj Temple-Pimplod
- Shivgiri Maharaj Lehgaon
- Gajanan Maharaj Temple-Shiwar
- Chandika Devi Temple at Chendikapur (of Nandkishor, Pranjali AND P.W.C.)
- Navaji Baba Temple Sasan BK

== Education ==
Daryapur's educational institutions include Adarsh High School Daryapur, Prabodhan Vidyalaya, Kokilaben GAWANDE Mahila Mahavidyalaya, which offer both undergraduate and postgraduate programs for girls. Other educational institutions include Urdu High School, Adarsh Mahavidyalaya.

Daraypur's education system is operated by the Central Board of Secondary Education, New Delhi.

== See also ==
- Khallar
