= Maharashtra Legislative Assembly =

Lower house of legislature in Maharashtra, India

Maharashtra Legislative Assembly Mahārāṣhṭra Vidhānasabhā
- 15th Maharashtra Assembly

Type
- Type: Lower house of the Maharashtra Legislature
- Term limits: 5 years

Leadership
- Governor of Maharashtra: Jishnu Dev Varma since 06 March 2026
- Speaker of the House: Rahul Narwekar, BJP since 3 July 2022
- Deputy Speaker of the House: Anna Bansode, NCP since 25 March 2025
- Chief Minister (Leader of the House): Devendra Fadnavis, BJP since 05 December 2024
- Deputy Chief Minister (Deputy Leader of the House): Eknath Shinde, SHS Sunetra Ajit Pawar, NCP 31 January 2026 since 05 December 2024
- Minister of Parliamentary Affairs: Chandrakant Patil, BJP since 21 December 2024
- Leader of the Opposition: Vacant (Note: No individual party secured 10% of seats to claim the chair of leader of the opposition.) since 23 November 2024 (Note: No leader of opposition because no political party obtained at least 10% of the seats in the assembly.)
- General Secretary: Rajendra Bhagwat, IAS

Structure
- Seats: 288
- Political groups: Government (237) MY (237): BJP (132); SHS (57); NCP (41); JSS (2); RSPS (1); RSVA (1); RYSP (1); IND (2); Opposition (51) MVA (48): SS(UBT) (20); INC (16); NCP(SP) (10); CPI(M) (1); PWPI (1); Others (3): SP (2); AIMIM (1)

Elections
- Voting system: First past the post
- Last election: 20 November 2024
- Next election: 2029

Meeting place
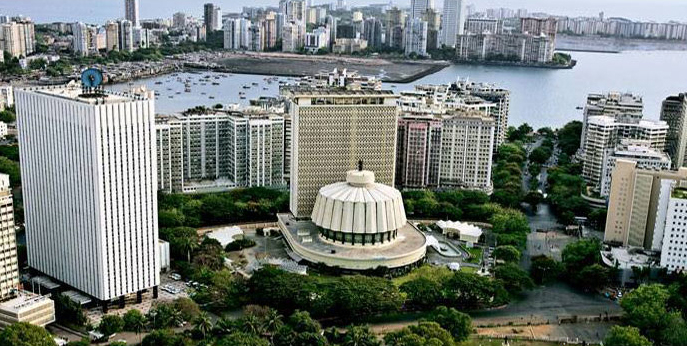
- Vidhan Bhavan, Mumbai
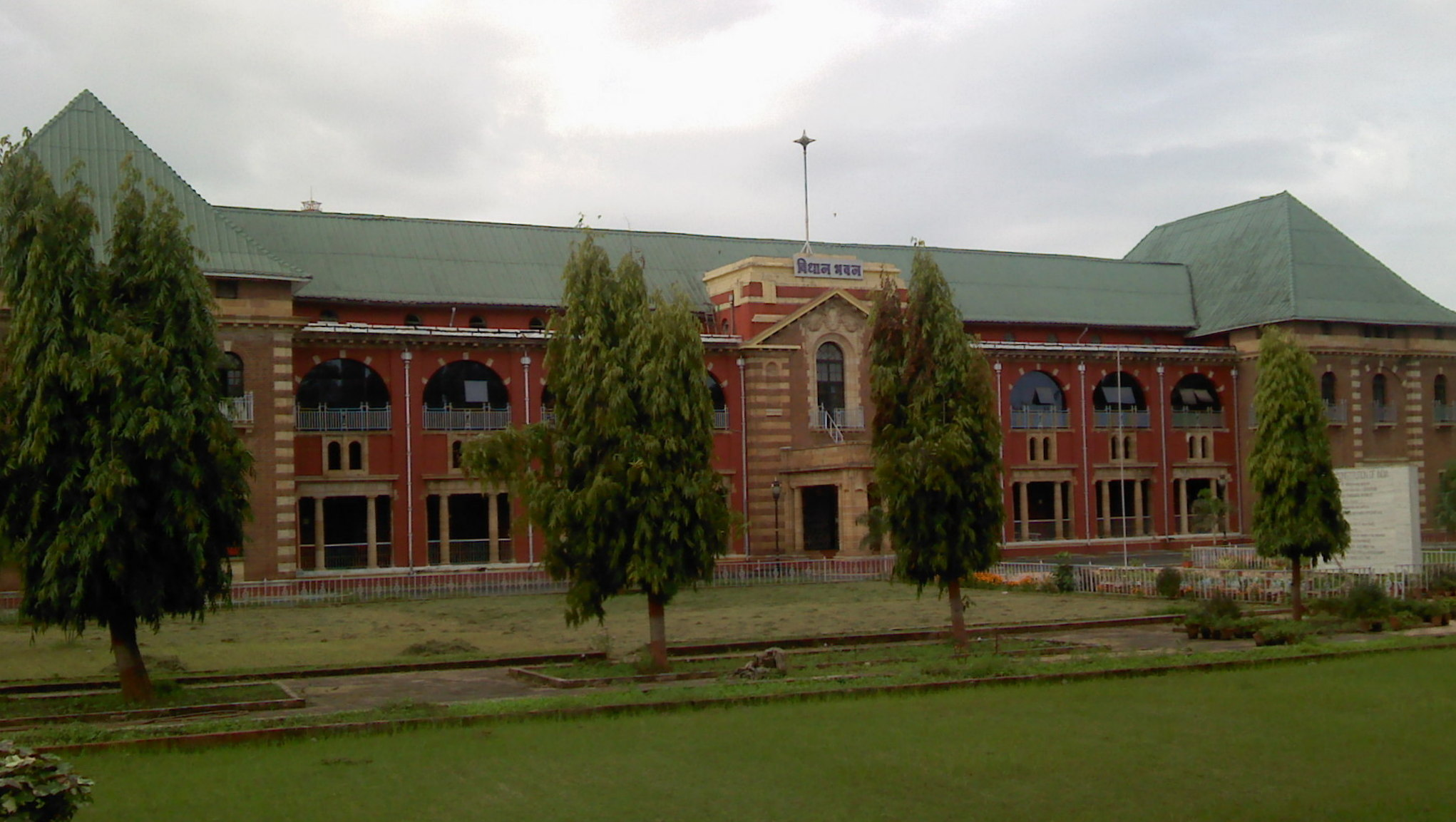
- Vidhan Bhavan, Nagpur (Winter session) Maharashtra Legislature

Website
- Government of Maharashtra; Maharashtra Legislature

The Maharashtra Legislative Assembly (ISO: Mahārāṣṭra Vidhānasabhā) is the lower house of the bicameral legislature of Maharashtra state in western India. It consists of 288 members directly elected from single-seat constituencies. The Assembly meets at Vidhan Bhavan in Mumbai, though the winter session is held in Nagpur. Along with the Maharashtra Legislative Council, it constitutes the legislature of Maharashtra. The presiding officer of the Assembly is the Speaker. Members of the Assembly are directly elected by the people of Maharashtra through elections held every five years, unless the Assembly is dissolved earlier. The current Assembly was elected in November 2024.

== List of assemblies ==
The following is the list of all the Maharashtra Legislative Assemblies (1961–present):

| Assembly | Year | Speaker | Chief Minister | Seats |
|---|---|---|---|---|
| 1st | 1960 | S. L. Silam (INC) | Yashwantrao Chavan (INC) | *INC had won the 1957 Bombay Legislative Assembly Elections. INC: 135; IND: 34; PSP: 33; PWP: 31; CPI: 13; SCF: 13; BJS: 4; HMS: 1; Total: 264 (of 396 Maharashtra + Gujarat Seats). |
| 2nd | 1962 | Balasaheb Bharde (INC) | Yashwantrao Chavan (INC); Marotrao Kannamwar (INC); P. K. Sawant (INC); Vasantrao Naik (INC) | INC: 215; PWP: 15; IND: 15; PSP: 9; CPI: 6; RPI: 3; Socialist: 1; Total: 264. |
| 3rd | 1967 | Balasaheb Bharde (INC) | Vasantrao Naik (INC) | INC: 203; PWP: 19; IND: 16; CPI: 10; PSP: 8; RPI: 5; SSP: 4; BJS: 4; CPM: 1; Total: 270. |
| 4th | 1972 | S. K. Wankhede (INC); Balasaheb Desai (INC) | Vasantrao Naik (INC); Shankarrao Chavan (INC); Vasantdada Patil (INC) | INC: 222; IND: 23; PWP: 7; BJS: 5; Socialist: 3; CPI: 2; AIFB: 2; RPI: 2; CPM: 1; IUML: 1; BKD: 1; SHS: 1. Total: 270. |
| 5th | 1978 | Shivraj Patil (INC); Pranlal Vora (INC) | Vasantdada Patil (INC(U)); Sharad Pawar (IC(S)) | JP: 99; INC: 69; INC(I): 62; IND: 28; PWP: 13; CPM: 9; AIFB: 3; RPI: 2; RPI(K): 2; CPI: 1; Total: 288. Post-poll INC + INC(I) Front. |
| 6th | 1980 | Sharad Dighe (INC) | A. R. Antulay (INC); Babasaheb Bhosale (INC); Vasantdada Patil (INC) | INC(I): 186; INC(U): 47; JP: 17; BJP: 14; IND: 10; PWP: 9; CPM: 2; CPI: 2; RPI(K): 1; Total: 288. |
| 7th | 1985 | Shankarrao Jagtap (INC) | Shivajirao Patil Nilangekar (INC); Shankarrao Chavan (INC); Sharad Pawar (INC) | INC: 161; ICS: 54; JP: 20; IND: 20; BJP: 16; PWP: 13; CPM: 2; CPI: 2; Total: 288. |
| 8th | 1990 | Madhukarrao Chaudhari (INC) | Sharad Pawar (INC); Sudhakarrao Naik (INC); Sharad Pawar (INC) | INC: 141; SHS: 52; BJP: 42; JD: 24; IND: 13; PWP: 8; CPM: 3; CPI: 2; RPI(K): 1; IUML: 1; ICS(SCS): 1; Total: 288. |
| 9th | 1995 | Dattaji Nalawade (SHS) | Manohar Joshi (SHS); Narayan Rane (SHS) | INC: 80; SHS: 73; BJP: 65; IND: 45; JD: 11; PWP: 6; CPM: 3; SP: 3; Maharashtra Vikas Congress: 1; NVAS: 1; Total: 288. |
| 10th | 1999 | Arun Gujarathi (NCP) | Vilasrao Deshmukh (INC); Sushilkumar Shinde (INC) | INC: 75; SHS: 69; NCP: 58; BJP: 56; IND: 12; PWP: 5; BBM: 3; CPM: 2; JD(S): 1;SP: 2; RPI: 1; GGP: 1; Native People's Party: 1; SJP (Maharashtra): 1; Total: 288. Post-poll INC + NCP Front. |
| 11th | 2004 | Babasaheb Kupekar (NCP) | Vilasrao Deshmukh (INC); Ashok Chavan (INC) | NCP: 71; INC: 69; SHS: 62; BJP: 54; IND: 19; Jan Surajya Shakti: 4; CPM: 3; PWP: 2; BBM: 1; RPI(A): 1; ABHS: 1; STBP: 1; Total: 288. |
| 12th | 2009 | Dilip Walse-Patil (NCP) | Ashok Chavan (INC); Prithviraj Chavan (INC) | INC: 82; NCP: 62; BJP: 46; SHS: 44; IND: 24; MNS: 13; PWP: 4; SP: 4; JSS: 2; BVA: 2; CPM: 1; BBM: 1; SWP: 1; RSPS: 1; Loksangram: 1; Total: 288. |
| 13th | 2014 | Haribhau Bagade (BJP) | Devendra Fadnavis (BJP) | BJP: 122; SHS: 63; INC: 42; NCP: 41; IND: 7; PWP: 3; BVA: 3; AIMIM: 2; CPM: 1; MNS: 1; SP: 1; BBM: 1; RSPS: 1; Total: 288. |
| 14th | 2019 | Nana Patole (INC); Rahul Narwekar (BJP) | Devendra Fadnavis (BJP); Uddhav Thackeray (SHS); Eknath Shinde (SHS) | BJP: 106; SHS: 56; NCP: 53; INC: 44; IND: 13; BVA: 3; AIMIM: 2; SP: 2; PHJSP: 2; CPM: 1; PWP: 1; MNS: 1; JSS: 1; SWP: 1; RSPS: 1; KSP: 1; Total: 288. Post Poll Shiv Sena + BJP Alliance |
| 15th | 2024 | Rahul Narwekar (BJP) | Devendra Fadnavis (BJP) | BJP: 132; SHS: 57; NCP: 41; SS (UBT): 20; INC: 16; NCP (SP): 10; IND: 2; JSS: 2; SP: 2; AIMIM: 1; RYSP: 1; CPM: 1; PWP: 1; RSVA: 1; RSPS:1; Total: 288. Maha Yuti Alliance |

== Office bearers ==
| Title | Portrait | Name | Since |
|---|---|---|---|
| Governor | | Jishnu Dev Varma | 10 March 2026 |
| Speaker | | Rahul Narwekar | 9 December 2024 |
| Deputy Speaker | | Anna Bansode | 25 March 2025 |
| Leader of the House (Chief Minister) | | Devendra Fadnavis | 5 December 2024 |
| Deputy Chief Minister | & | Eknath Shinde & Sunetra Pawar | 5 December 2024 & 31 January 2026 |
| Leader of Opposition | | vacant | |

== Sessions ==
The budget session and the monsoon session are convened in Mumbai whereas the winter session is convened in the auxiliary capital Nagpur. In 1975 because elections were in winter season, the monsoon (second) session was convened in Nagpur and winter (third) session was convened in Mumbai.

== Maharashtra Legislature Leaders ==
| House | Leader | Portrait | Since |
Leader of Maharashtra Legislative Assembly Party
| Group Leader of Legislative Assembly BJP Party | Devendra Fadnavis | | 26 November 2024 |
| Group Leader of Legislative Assembly SHS Party | Eknath Shinde | | 26 November 2024 |
| Group Leader of Legislative Assembly NCP Party | Sunetra Ajit Pawar | | 31 January 2026 |
| Group Leader of Legislative Assembly SS(UBT) Party | Aaditya Thackeray | | 26 November 2024 |
| Group Leader of Legislative Assembly Congress Party | Vijay Wadettiwar | | 13 February 2025 |
| Group Leader of Legislative Assembly NCP(SP) Party | Jitendra Awhad | | 1 December 2024 |

== Members of Legislative Assembly ==
| District | # | Constituency | Member | Party | Alliance | Remarks |
|---|---|---|---|---|---|---|
| Nandurbar | 1 | Akkalkuwa (ST) | Aamshya Padavi | SHS | NDA | |
| Nandurbar | 2 | Shahada (ST) | Rajesh Padvi | BJP | NDA | |
| Nandurbar | 3 | Nandurbar (ST) | Vijaykumar Gavit | BJP | NDA | |
| Nandurbar | 4 | Navapur (ST) | Shirishkumar Naik | INC | MVA | |
| Dhule | 5 | Sakri (ST) | Manjula Gavit | SHS | NDA | |
| Dhule | 6 | Dhule Rural | Raghavendra Patil | BJP | NDA | |
| Dhule | 7 | Dhule City | Anup Agrawal | BJP | NDA | |
| Dhule | 8 | Sindkheda | Jayakumar Rawal | BJP | NDA | |
| Dhule | 9 | Shirpur (ST) | Kashiram Pawara | BJP | NDA | |
| Jalgaon | 10 | Chopda (ST) | Chandrakant Sonawane | SHS | NDA | |
| Jalgaon | 11 | Raver | Amol Jawale | BJP | NDA | |
| Jalgaon | 12 | Bhusawal (SC) | Sanjay Savkare | BJP | NDA | |
| Jalgaon | 13 | Jalgaon City | Suresh Bhole | BJP | NDA | |
| Jalgaon | 14 | Jalgaon Rural | Gulabrao Patil | SHS | NDA | |
| Jalgaon | 15 | Amalner | Anil Bhaidas Patil | NCP | NDA | |
| Jalgaon | 16 | Erandol | Amol Patil | SHS | NDA | |
| Jalgaon | 17 | Chalisgaon | Mangesh Chavan | BJP | NDA | |
| Jalgaon | 18 | Pachora | Kishor Appa Patil | SHS | NDA | |
| Jalgaon | 19 | Jamner | Girish Mahajan | BJP | NDA | |
| Jalgaon | 20 | Muktainagar | Chandrakant Nimba Patil | SHS | NDA | |
| Buldana | 21 | Malkapur | Chainsukh Sancheti | BJP | NDA | |
| Buldana | 22 | Buldhana | Sanjay Gaikwad | SHS | NDA | |
| Buldana | 23 | Chikhali | Shweta Mahale | BJP | NDA | |
| Buldana | 24 | Sindkhed Raja | Manoj Kayande | NCP | NDA | |
| Buldana | 25 | Mehkar (SC) | Siddharth Kharat | SS(UBT) | MVA | |
| Buldana | 26 | Khamgaon | Akash Fundkar | BJP | NDA | |
| Buldana | 27 | Jalgaon (Jamod) | Sanjay Kute | BJP | NDA | |
| Akola | 28 | Akot | Prakash Bharsakale | BJP | NDA | |
| Akola | 29 | Balapur | Nitin Tale | SS(UBT) | MVA | |
| Akola | 30 | Akola West | Sajid Khan Pathan | INC | MVA | |
| Akola | 31 | Akola East | Randhir Savarkar | BJP | NDA | |
| Akola | 32 | Murtizapur (SC) | Harish Pimple | BJP | NDA | |
| Washim | 33 | Risod | Amit Zanak | INC | MVA | |
| Washim | 34 | Washim (SC) | Shyam Khode | BJP | NDA | |
| Washim | 35 | Karanja | Sai Prakash Dahake | BJP | NDA | |
| Amravati | 36 | Dhamangaon Railway | Pratap Adsad | BJP | NDA | |
| Amravati | 37 | Badnera | Ravi Rana | RYSP | NDA | |
| Amravati | 38 | Amravati | Sulbha Khodke | NCP | NDA | |
| Amravati | 39 | Teosa | Rajesh Wankhade | BJP | NDA | |
| Amravati | 40 | Daryapur (SC) | Gajanan Lawate | SS(UBT) | MVA | |
| Amravati | 41 | Melghat (ST) | Kewalram Kale | BJP | NDA | |
| Amravati | 42 | Achalpur | Pravin Tayade | BJP | NDA | |
| Amravati | 43 | Morshi | Chandu Yawalkar | BJP | NDA | |
| Wardha | 44 | Arvi | Sumit Wankhede | BJP | NDA | |
| Wardha | 45 | Deoli | Rajesh Bakane | BJP | NDA | |
| Wardha | 46 | Hinganghat | Samir Kunawar | BJP | NDA | |
| Wardha | 47 | Wardha | Pankaj Bhoyar | BJP | NDA | |
| Nagpur | 48 | Katol | Charansing Thakur | BJP | NDA | |
| Nagpur | 49 | Savner | Ashish Deshmukh | BJP | NDA | |
| Nagpur | 50 | Hingna | Sameer Meghe | BJP | NDA | |
| Nagpur | 51 | Umred (SC) | Sanjay Meshram | INC | MVA | |
| Nagpur | 52 | Nagpur South West | Devendra Fadnavis | BJP | NDA | Chief Minister |
| Nagpur | 53 | Nagpur South | Mohan Mate | BJP | NDA | |
| Nagpur | 54 | Nagpur East | Krishna Khopde | BJP | NDA | |
| Nagpur | 55 | Nagpur Central | Pravin Datke | BJP | NDA | |
| Nagpur | 56 | Nagpur West | Vikas Thakre | INC | MVA | |
| Nagpur | 57 | Nagpur North (SC) | Nitin Raut | INC | MVA | |
| Nagpur | 58 | Kamthi | Chandrashekhar Bawankule | BJP | NDA | |
| Nagpur | 59 | Ramtek | Ashish Jaiswal | SHS | NDA | |
| Bhandara | 60 | Tumsar | Raju Karemore | NCP | NDA | |
| Bhandara | 61 | Bhandara (SC) | Narendra Bhondekar | SHS | NDA | |
| Bhandara | 62 | Sakoli | Nana Patole | INC | MVA | |
| Gondia | 63 | Arjuni Morgaon (SC) | Rajkumar Badole | NCP | NDA | |
| Gondia | 64 | Tirora | Vijay Rahangdale | BJP | NDA | |
| Gondia | 65 | Gondiya | Vinod Agrawal | BJP | NDA | |
| Gondia | 66 | Amgaon (ST) | Sanjay Puram | BJP | NDA | |
| Gadchiroli | 67 | Armori (ST) | Ramdas Masram | INC | MVA | |
| Gadchiroli | 68 | Gadchiroli (ST) | Milind Narote | BJP | NDA | |
| Gadchiroli | 69 | Aheri (ST) | Dharamrao Baba Atram | NCP | NDA | |
| Chandrapur | 70 | Rajura | Deorao Bhongle | BJP | NDA | |
| Chandrapur | 71 | Chandrapur (SC) | Kishor Jorgewar | BJP | NDA | |
| Chandrapur | 72 | Ballarpur | Sudhir Mungantiwar | BJP | NDA | |
| Chandrapur | 73 | Bramhapuri | Vijay Wadettiwar | INC | MVA | |
| Chandrapur | 74 | Chimur | Bunty Bhangdiya | BJP | NDA | |
| Chandrapur | 75 | Warora | Karan Deotale | BJP | NDA | |
| Yavatmal | 76 | Wani | Sanjay Derkar | SS(UBT) | MVA | |
| Yavatmal | 77 | Ralegaon (ST) | Ashok Uike | BJP | NDA | |
| Yavatmal | 78 | Yavatmal | Balasaheb Mangulkar | INC | MVA | |
| Yavatmal | 79 | Digras | Sanjay Rathod | SHS | NDA | |
| Yavatmal | 80 | Arni (ST) | Raju Todsam | BJP | NDA | |
| Yavatmal | 81 | Pusad | Indranil Naik | NCP | NDA | |
| Yavatmal | 82 | Umarkhed (SC) | Kisan Wankhede | BJP | NDA | |
| Nanded | 83 | Kinwat | Bhimrao Keram | BJP | NDA | |
| Nanded | 84 | Hadgaon | Baburao Kadam | SHS | NDA | |
| Nanded | 85 | Bhokar | Sreejaya Chavan | BJP | NDA | |
| Nanded | 86 | Nanded North | Balaji Kalyankar | SHS | NDA | |
| Nanded | 87 | Nanded South | Anand Tidke | SHS | NDA | |
| Nanded | 88 | Loha | Prataprao Chikhalikar | NCP | NDA | |
| Nanded | 89 | Naigaon | Rajesh Pawar | BJP | NDA | |
| Nanded | 90 | Deglur (SC) | Jitesh Antapurkar | BJP | NDA | |
| Nanded | 91 | Mukhed | Tushar Rathod | BJP | NDA | |
| Hingoli | 92 | Basmath | Chandrakant Nawghare | NCP | NDA | |
| Hingoli | 93 | Kalamnuri | Santosh Bangar | SHS | NDA | |
| Hingoli | 94 | Hingoli | Tanaji Mutkule | BJP | NDA | |
| Parbhani | 95 | Jintur | Meghana Bordikar | BJP | NDA | |
| Parbhani | 96 | Parbhani | Rahul Vedprakash Patil | SS(UBT) | MVA | |
| Parbhani | 97 | Gangakhed | Ratnakar Gutte | RSPS | NDA | |
| Parbhani | 98 | Pathri | Rajesh Vitekar | NCP | NDA | |
| Jalna | 99 | Partur | Babanrao Lonikar | BJP | NDA | |
| Jalna | 100 | Ghansawangi | Hikmat Udhan | SHS | NDA | |
| Jalna | 101 | Jalna | Arjun Khotkar | SHS | NDA | |
| Jalna | 102 | Badnapur (SC) | Narayan Kuche | BJP | NDA | |
| Jalna | 103 | Bhokardan | Santosh Danve | BJP | NDA | |
| Chhatrapati Sambhaji Nagar | 104 | Sillod | Abdul Sattar | SHS | NDA | |
| Chhatrapati Sambhaji Nagar | 105 | Kannad | Sanjana Jadhav | SHS | NDA | |
| Chhatrapati Sambhaji Nagar | 106 | Phulambri | Anuradha Chavan | BJP | NDA | |
| Chhatrapati Sambhaji Nagar | 107 | Aurangabad Central | Pradeep Jaiswal | SHS | NDA | |
| Chhatrapati Sambhaji Nagar | 108 | Aurangabad West (SC) | Sanjay Shirsat | SHS | NDA | |
| Chhatrapati Sambhaji Nagar | 109 | Aurangabad East | Atul Save | BJP | NDA | |
| Chhatrapati Sambhaji Nagar | 110 | Paithan | Vilas Bhumre | SHS | NDA | |
| Chhatrapati Sambhaji Nagar | 111 | Gangapur | Prashant Bamb | BJP | NDA | |
| Chhatrapati Sambhaji Nagar | 112 | Vaijapur | Ramesh Bornare | SHS | NDA | |
| Nashik | 113 | Nandgaon | Suhas Kande | SHS | NDA | |
| Nashik | 114 | Malegaon Central | Ismail Abdul Khalique | AIMIM | None | |
| Nashik | 115 | Malegaon Outer | Dadaji Bhuse | SHS | NDA | |
| Nashik | 116 | Baglan (ST) | Dilip Borse | BJP | NDA | |
| Nashik | 117 | Kalwan (ST) | Nitin Pawar | NCP | NDA | |
| Nashik | 118 | Chandwad | Rahul Aher | BJP | NDA | |
| Nashik | 119 | Yevla | Chhagan Bhujbal | NCP | NDA | |
| Nashik | 120 | Sinnar | Manikrao Kokate | NCP | NDA | |
| Nashik | 121 | Niphad | Diliprao Bankar | NCP | NDA | |
| Nashik | 122 | Dindori (ST) | Narhari Zirwal | NCP | NDA | |
| Nashik | 123 | Nashik East | Rahul Dhikale | BJP | NDA | |
| Nashik | 124 | Nashik Central | Devayani Farande | BJP | NDA | |
| Nashik | 125 | Nashik West | Seema Hiray | BJP | NDA | |
| Nashik | 126 | Deolali (SC) | Saroj Ahire | NCP | NDA | |
| Nashik | 127 | Igatpuri (ST) | Hiraman Khoskar | NCP | NDA | |
| Palghar | 128 | Dahanu (ST) | Vinod Bhiva Nikole | CPI(M) | MVA | |
| Palghar | 129 | Vikramgad (ST) | Harishchandra Bhoye | BJP | NDA | |
| Palghar | 130 | Palghar (ST) | Rajendra Gavit | SHS | NDA | |
| Palghar | 131 | Boisar (ST) | Vilas Tare | SHS | NDA | |
| Palghar | 132 | Nalasopara | Rajan Naik | BJP | NDA | |
| Palghar | 133 | Vasai | Sneha Pandit | BJP | NDA | |
| Thane | 134 | Bhiwandi Rural (ST) | Shantaram More | SHS | NDA | |
| Thane | 135 | Shahapur (ST) | Daulat Daroda | NCP | NDA | |
| Thane | 136 | Bhiwandi West | Mahesh Choughule | BJP | NDA | |
| Thane | 137 | Bhiwandi East | Rais Shaikh | SP | None | |
| Thane | 138 | Kalyan West | Vishwanath Bhoir | SHS | NDA | |
| Thane | 139 | Murbad | Kisan Kathore | BJP | NDA | |
| Thane | 140 | Ambernath (SC) | Balaji Kinikar | SHS | NDA | |
| Thane | 141 | Ulhasnagar | Kumar Ailani | BJP | NDA | |
| Thane | 142 | Kalyan East | Sulbha Gaikwad | BJP | NDA | |
| Thane | 143 | Dombivli | Ravindra Chavan | BJP | NDA | |
| Thane | 144 | Kalyan Rural | Rajesh More | SHS | NDA | |
| Thane | 145 | Mira Bhayandar | Narendra Mehta | BJP | NDA | |
| Thane | 146 | Ovala-Majiwada | Pratap Sarnaik | SHS | NDA | |
| Thane | 147 | Kopri-Pachpakhadi | Eknath Shinde | SHS | NDA | Dy Chief Minister |
| Thane | 148 | Thane | Sanjay Kelkar | BJP | NDA | |
| Thane | 149 | Mumbra-Kalwa | Jitendra Awhad | NCP-SP | MVA | |
| Thane | 150 | Airoli | Ganesh Naik | BJP | NDA | |
| Thane | 151 | Belapur | Manda Mhatre | BJP | NDA | |
| Mumbai Suburban | 152 | Borivali | Sanjay Upadhyay | BJP | NDA | |
| Mumbai Suburban | 153 | Dahisar | Manisha Chaudhary | BJP | NDA | |
| Mumbai Suburban | 154 | Magathane | Prakash Surve | SHS | NDA | |
| Mumbai Suburban | 155 | Mulund | Mihir Kotecha | BJP | NDA | |
| Mumbai Suburban | 156 | Vikhroli | Sunil Raut | SS(UBT) | MVA | |
| Mumbai Suburban | 157 | Bhandup West | Ashok Patil | SHS | NDA | |
| Mumbai Suburban | 158 | Jogeshwari East | Anant Nar | SS(UBT) | MVA | |
| Mumbai Suburban | 159 | Dindoshi | Sunil Prabhu | SS(UBT) | MVA | |
| Mumbai Suburban | 160 | Kandivali East | Atul Bhatkhalkar | BJP | NDA | |
| Mumbai Suburban | 161 | Charkop | Yogesh Sagar | BJP | NDA | |
| Mumbai Suburban | 162 | Malad West | Aslam Shaikh | INC | MVA | |
| Mumbai Suburban | 163 | Goregaon | Vidya Thakur | BJP | NDA | |
| Mumbai Suburban | 164 | Versova | Haroon Rashid Khan | SS(UBT) | MVA | |
| Mumbai Suburban | 165 | Andheri West | Ameet Satam | BJP | NDA | |
| Mumbai Suburban | 166 | Andheri East | Murji Patel | SHS | NDA | |
| Mumbai Suburban | 167 | Vile Parle | Parag Alavani | BJP | NDA | |
| Mumbai Suburban | 168 | Chandivali | Dilip Lande | SHS | NDA | |
| Mumbai Suburban | 169 | Ghatkopar West | Ram Kadam | BJP | NDA | |
| Mumbai Suburban | 170 | Ghatkopar East | Parag Shah | BJP | NDA | |
| Mumbai Suburban | 171 | Mankhurd Shivaji Nagar | Abu Asim Azmi | SP | None | |
| Mumbai Suburban | 172 | Anushakti Nagar | Sana Malik | NCP | NDA | |
| Mumbai Suburban | 173 | Chembur | Tukaram Kate | SHS | NDA | |
| Mumbai Suburban | 174 | Kurla(SC) | Mangesh Kudalkar | SHS | NDA | |
| Mumbai Suburban | 175 | Kalina | Sanjay Potnis | SS(UBT) | MVA | |
| Mumbai Suburban | 176 | Vandre East | Varun Sardesai | SS(UBT) | MVA | |
| Mumbai Suburban | 177 | Vandre West | Ashish Shelar | BJP | NDA | |
| Mumbai City | 178 | Dharavi (SC) | Jyoti Gaikwad | INC | MVA | |
| Mumbai City | 179 | Sion Koliwada | R. Tamil Selvan | BJP | NDA | |
| Mumbai City | 180 | Wadala | Kalidas Kolambkar | BJP | NDA | |
| Mumbai City | 181 | Mahim | Mahesh Sawant | SS(UBT) | MVA | |
| Mumbai City | 182 | Worli | Aaditya Thackeray | SS(UBT) | MVA | |
| Mumbai City | 183 | Shivadi | Ajay Choudhari | SS(UBT) | MVA | |
| Mumbai City | 184 | Byculla | Manoj Jamsutkar | SS(UBT) | MVA | |
| Mumbai City | 185 | Malabar Hill | Mangal Lodha | BJP | NDA | |
| Mumbai City | 186 | Mumbadevi | Amin Patel | INC | MVA | |
| Mumbai City | 187 | Colaba | Rahul Narwekar | BJP | NDA | |
| Raigad | 188 | Panvel | Prashant Thakur | BJP | NDA | |
| Raigad | 189 | Karjat | Mahendra Thorve | SHS | NDA | |
| Raigad | 190 | Uran | Mahesh Baldi | BJP | NDA | |
| Raigad | 191 | Pen | Ravisheth Patil | BJP | NDA | |
| Raigad | 192 | Alibag | Mahendra Dalvi | SHS | NDA | |
| Raigad | 193 | Shrivardhan | Aditi Tatkare | NCP | NDA | |
| Raigad | 194 | Mahad | Bharatshet Gogawale | SHS | NDA | |
| Pune | 195 | Junnar | Sharaddada Sonavane | IND | NDA | |
| Pune | 196 | Ambegaon | Dilip Walse Patil | NCP | NDA | |
| Pune | 197 | Khed Alandi | Babaji Kale | SS(UBT) | MVA | |
| Pune | 198 | Shirur | Dnyaneshwar Katke | NCP | NDA | |
| Pune | 199 | Daund | Rahul Kul | BJP | NDA | |
| Pune | 200 | Indapur | Dattatray Bharne | NCP | NDA | |
| Pune | 201 | Baramati | Ajit Pawar | NCP | NDA | Died on 28 January 2026 |
| Pune | 201 | Baramati | Sunetra Pawar | NCP | NDA | Dy Chief Minister |
| Pune | 202 | Purandar | Vijay Shivtare | SHS | NDA | |
| Pune | 203 | Bhor | Shankar Mandekar | NCP | NDA | |
| Pune | 204 | Maval | Sunil Shelke | NCP | NDA | |
| Pune | 205 | Chinchwad | Shankar Jagtap | BJP | NDA | |
| Pune | 206 | Pimpri (SC) | Anna Bansode | NCP | NDA | |
| Pune | 207 | Bhosari | Mahesh Landge | BJP | NDA | |
| Pune | 208 | Vadgaon Sheri | Bapusaheb Pathare | NCP-SP | MVA | |
| Pune | 209 | Shivajinagar | Siddharth Shirole | BJP | NDA | |
| Pune | 210 | Kothrud | Chandrakant Patil | BJP | NDA | |
| Pune | 211 | Khadakwasala | Bhimrao Tapkir | BJP | NDA | |
| Pune | 212 | Parvati | Madhuri Misal | BJP | NDA | |
| Pune | 213 | Hadapsar | Chetan Tupe | NCP | NDA | |
| Pune | 214 | Pune Cantonment | Sunil Kamble | BJP | NDA | |
| Pune | 215 | Kasba Peth | Hemant Rasane | BJP | NDA | |
| Ahmednagar | 216 | Akole (ST) | Kiran Lahamate | NCP | NDA | |
| Ahmednagar | 217 | Sangamner | Amol Khatal | SHS | NDA | |
| Ahmednagar | 218 | Shirdi | Radhakrishna Vikhe Patil | BJP | NDA | |
| Ahmednagar | 219 | Kopargaon | Ashutosh Kale | NCP | NDA | |
| Ahmednagar | 220 | Shrirampur (SC) | Hemant Ogale | INC | MVA | |
| Ahmednagar | 221 | Nevasa | Vitthalrao Langhe | SHS | NDA | |
| Ahmednagar | 222 | Shevgaon | Monika Rajale | BJP | NDA | |
| Ahmednagar | 223 | Rahuri | Shivaji Kardile | BJP | NDA | Died on 17 October 2025 |
| Ahmednagar | 223 | Rahuri | Akshay Shivajirao Kardile | BJP | NDA | |
| Ahmednagar | 224 | Parner | Kashinath Date | NCP | NDA | |
| Ahmednagar | 225 | Ahmednagar City | Sangram Jagtap | NCP | NDA | |
| Ahmednagar | 226 | Shrigonda | Vikram Pachpute | BJP | NDA | |
| Ahmednagar | 227 | Karjat Jamkhed | Rohit Pawar | NCP-SP | MVA | |
| Beed | 228 | Georai (SC) | Vijaysinh Pandit | NCP | NDA | |
| Beed | 229 | Majalgaon | Prakashdada Solanke | NCP | NDA | |
| Beed | 230 | Beed | Sandeep Kshirsagar | NCP-SP | MVA | |
| Beed | 231 | Ashti | Suresh Dhas | BJP | NDA | |
| Beed | 232 | Kaij (SC) | Namita Mundada | BJP | NDA | |
| Beed | 233 | Parli | Dhananjay Munde | NCP | NDA | |
| Latur | 234 | Latur Rural | Ramesh Karad | BJP | NDA | |
| Latur | 235 | Latur City | Amit Deshmukh | INC | MVA | |
| Latur | 236 | Ahmadpur | Babasaheb Patil | NCP | NDA | |
| Latur | 237 | Udgir (SC) | Sanjay Bansode | NCP | NDA | |
| Latur | 238 | Nilanga | Sambhaji Patil Nilangekar | BJP | NDA | |
| Latur | 239 | Ausa | Abhimanyu Pawar | BJP | NDA | |
| Dharashiv | 240 | Umarga (SC) | Pravin Virbhadrayya Swami | SS(UBT) | MVA | |
| Dharashiv | 241 | Tuljapur | Ranajagjitsinha Patil | BJP | NDA | |
| Dharashiv | 242 | Dharashiv | Kailas Patil | SS(UBT) | MVA | |
| Dharashiv | 243 | Paranda | Tanaji Sawant | SHS | NDA | |
| Solapur | 244 | Karmala | Narayan Patil | NCP-SP | MVA | |
| Solapur | 245 | Madha | Abhijeet Patil | NCP-SP | MVA | |
| Solapur | 246 | Barshi | Dilip Sopal | SS(UBT) | MVA | |
| Solapur | 247 | Mohol (SC) | Raju Khare | NCP-SP | MVA | |
| Solapur | 248 | Solapur City North | Vijay Deshmukh | BJP | NDA | |
| Solapur | 249 | Solapur City Central | Devendra Kothe | BJP | NDA | |
| Solapur | 250 | Akkalkot | Sachin Kalyanshetti | BJP | NDA | |
| Solapur | 251 | Solapur South | Subhash Deshmukh | BJP | NDA | |
| Solapur | 252 | Pandharpur | Samadhan Autade | BJP | NDA | |
| Solapur | 253 | Sangola | Babasaheb Deshmukh | PWPI | MVA | |
| Solapur | 254 | Malshiras (SC) | Uttamrao Jankar | NCP-SP | MVA | |
| Satara | 255 | Phaltan (SC) | Sachin Patil | NCP | NDA | |
| Satara | 256 | Wai | Makrand Jadhav - Patil | NCP | NDA | |
| Satara | 257 | Koregaon | Mahesh Shinde | SHS | NDA | |
| Satara | 258 | Man | Jaykumar Gore | BJP | NDA | |
| Satara | 259 | Karad North | Manoj Ghorpade | BJP | NDA | |
| Satara | 260 | Karad South | Atulbaba Bhosale | BJP | NDA | |
| Satara | 261 | Patan | Shambhuraj Desai | SHS | NDA | |
| Satara | 262 | Satara | Shivendra Raje Bhosale | BJP | NDA | |
| Ratnagiri | 263 | Dapoli | Yogesh Kadam | SHS | NDA | |
| Ratnagiri | 264 | Guhagar | Bhaskar Jadhav | SS(UBT) | MVA | |
| Ratnagiri | 265 | Chiplun | Shekhar Nikam | NCP | NDA | |
| Ratnagiri | 266 | Ratnagiri | Uday Samant | SHS | NDA | |
| Ratnagiri | 267 | Rajapur | Kiran Samant | SHS | NDA | |
| Sindhudurg | 268 | Kankavli | Nitesh Rane | BJP | NDA | |
| Sindhudurg | 269 | Kudal | Nilesh Rane | SHS | NDA | |
| Sindhudurg | 270 | Sawantwadi | Deepak Kesarkar | SHS | NDA | |
| Kolhapur | 271 | Chandgad | Shivaji Patil | IND | NDA | |
| Kolhapur | 272 | Radhanagari | Prakashrao Abitkar | SHS | NDA | |
| Kolhapur | 273 | Kagal | Hasan Mushrif | NCP | NDA | |
| Kolhapur | 274 | Kolhapur South | Amal Mahadik | BJP | NDA | |
| Kolhapur | 275 | Karvir | Chandradip Narke | SHS | NDA | |
| Kolhapur | 276 | Kolhapur North | Rajesh Kshirsagar | SHS | NDA | |
| Kolhapur | 277 | Shahuwadi | Vinay Kore | JSS | NDA | |
| Kolhapur | 278 | Hatkanangle (SC) | Ashokrao Mane | JSS | NDA | |
| Kolhapur | 279 | Ichalkaranji | Rahul Awade | BJP | NDA | |
| Kolhapur | 280 | Shirol | Rajendra Patil Yadravkar | RSVA | NDA | |
| Sangli | 281 | Miraj (SC) | Suresh Khade | BJP | NDA | |
| Sangli | 282 | Sangli | Sudhir Gadgil | BJP | NDA | |
| Sangli | 283 | Islampur | Jayant Patil | NCP-SP | MVA | |
| Sangli | 284 | Shirala | Satyajit Deshmukh | BJP | NDA | |
| Sangli | 285 | Palus-Kadegaon | Vishwajeet Kadam | INC | MVA | |
| Sangli | 286 | Khanapur | Suhas Babar | SHS | NDA | |
| Sangli | 287 | Tasgaon-Kavathe Mahankal | Rohit Patil | NCP-SP | MVA | |
| Sangli | 288 | Jat | Gopichand Padalkar | BJP | NDA | |

== See also ==
- Bombay Legislative Assembly
- Legislature of Maharashtra
- Elections in Maharashtra
- List of constituencies of Maharashtra Legislative Assembly
- Maharashtra Vidhan Parishad
- List of governors of Maharashtra
- List of chief ministers of Maharashtra
- List of speakers of the Maharashtra Legislative Assembly
- List of deputy speakers of the Maharashtra Legislative Assembly
- List of leaders of the house in the Maharashtra Legislative Assembly
- List of deputy leaders of the house in the Maharashtra Legislative Assembly
- List of leaders of the opposition in the Maharashtra Legislative Assembly
