= 2019 Maharashtra Legislative Assembly election =

Election in India

- 21 October 2019

All 288 seats to the Maharashtra Legislative Assembly 145 seats needed for a majority
- Opinion polls
- Turnout: 61.44% (▼1.94%)
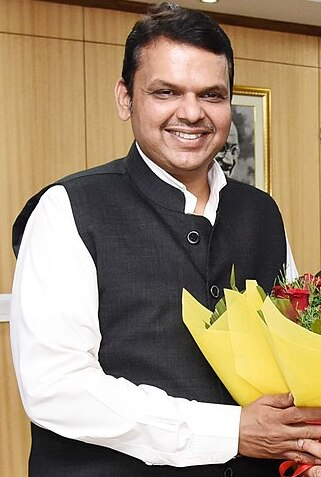

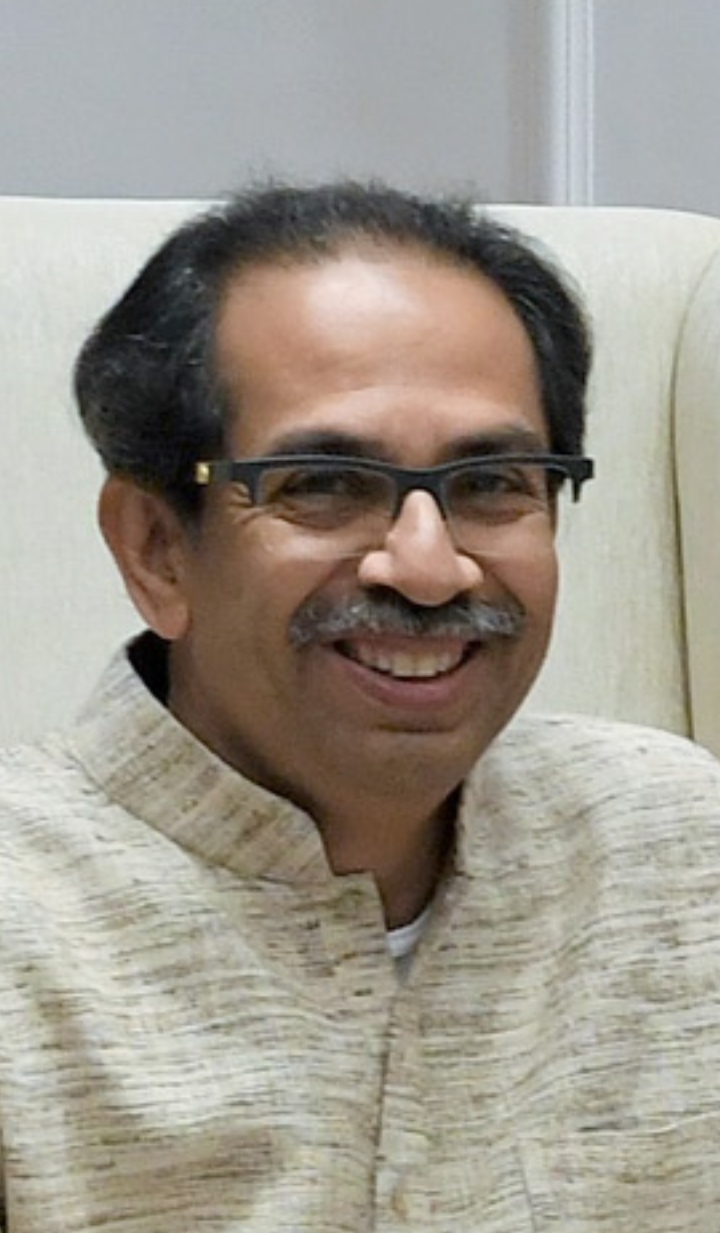

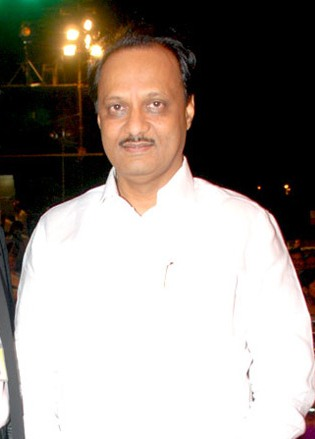

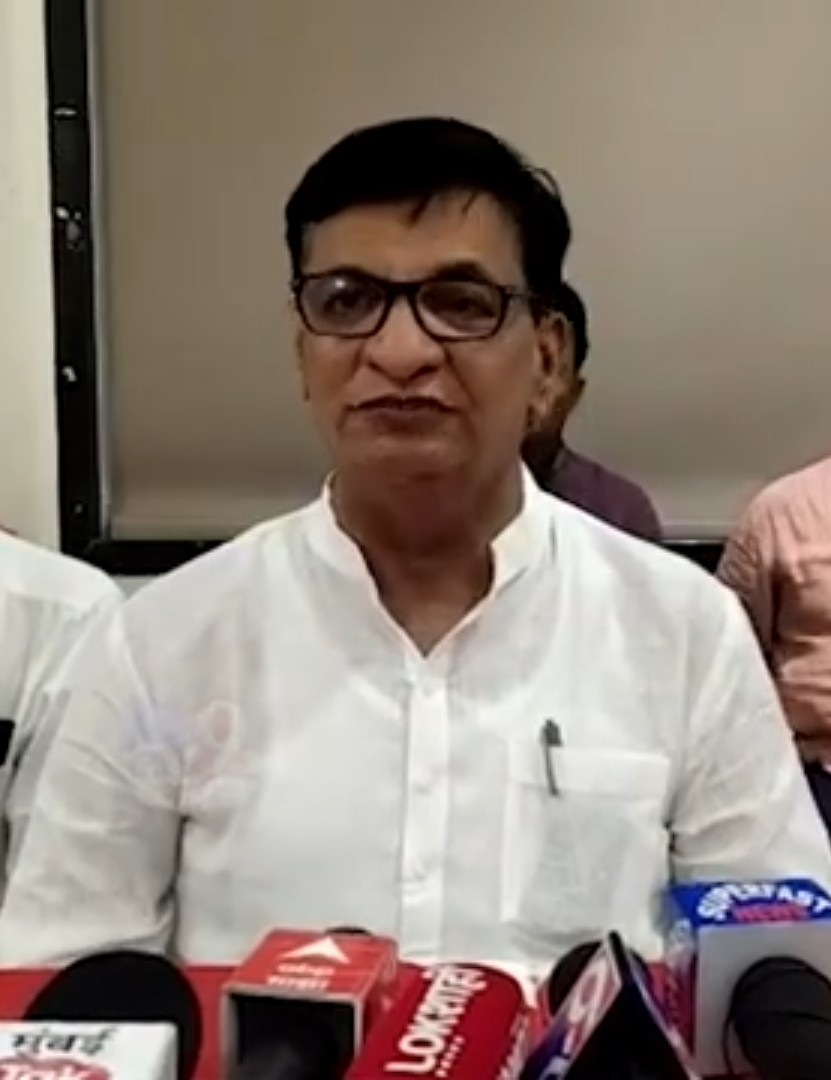

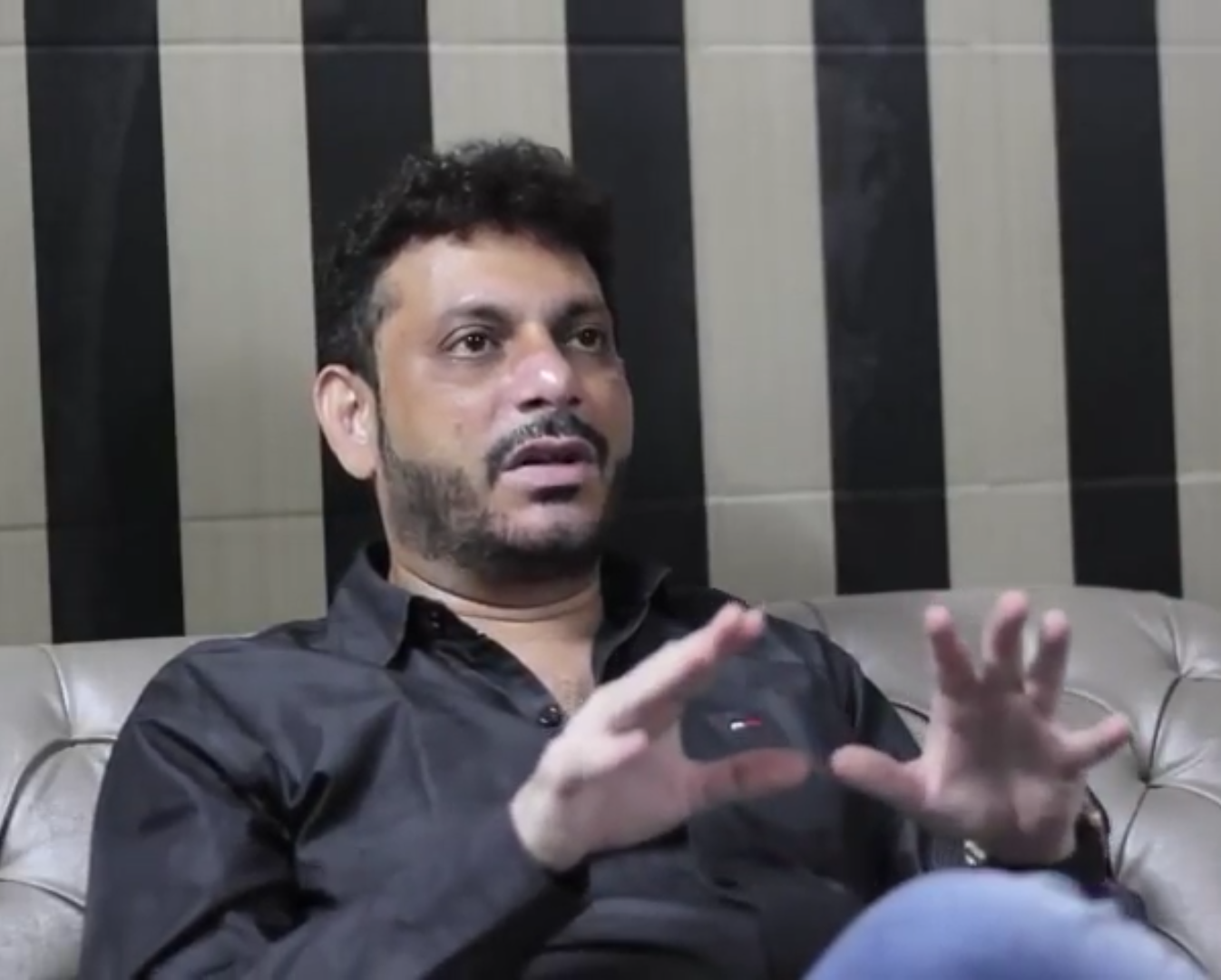

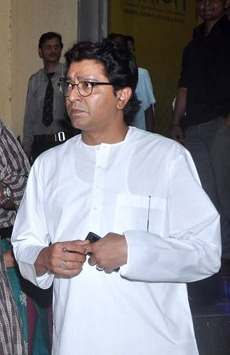
	Majority party	Minority party	Third party
Leader	Devendra Fadnavis	Uddhav Thackeray	Ajit Pawar
Party	BJP	SS	NCP
Alliance	NDA	NDA	UPA
Leader's seat	Nagpur South West	Did not contest	Baramati
Last election	122	63	41
Seats won	105	56	54
Seat change	▼17	▼7	▲13
Popular vote	1,41,99,375	90,49,789	92,16,919
Percentage	25.75%	16.41%	16.71%
Swing	▼2.06 pp	▼3.04 pp	▼0.53 pp
	Fourth party	Fifth party	Sixth party
Leader	Balasaheb Thorat	Waris Pathan	Raj Thackeray
Party	INC	AIMIM	MNS
Alliance	UPA
Leader's seat	Sangamner	Byculla (lost)	Did not contest
Last election	42	2	1
Seats won	44	2	1
Seat change	▲2	Steady	Steady
Popular vote	87,52,199	7,37,888	12,42,135
Percentage	15.87%	1.34%	2.25%
Swing	▼2.07 pp	▲0.41 pp	▼0.92 pp

- Structure of the Maharashtra Legislative Assembly after the election
Chief Minister before election
Devendra Fadnavis
Bharatiya Janata Party (NDA)
Elected Chief Minister
Uddhav Thackeray
Shiv Sena (UPA)

The 2019 Maharashtra Legislative Assembly election was held on 21 October 2019 to elect all 288 members of the state's Legislative Assembly. After a 61.4% turnout in the election, the ruling National Democratic Alliance (NDA) of the Bharatiya Janata Party (BJP) and Shiv Sena (SHS) won a majority. Following differences over the government formation, the alliance was dissolved, precipitating a political crisis.

Since a council of ministers had not been formed after no party could manage to form the government, President's rule was imposed in the state. On 23 November 2019, Devendra Fadnavis was sworn in as the Chief Minister and Ajit Pawar was sworn in as Deputy Chief Minister. However, both resigned on 26 November 2019 before the floor test and on 28 November 2019, Shiv Sena, NCP, and Congress formed the government under a new alliance Maha Vikas Aghadi (MVA), with Uddhav Thackeray as the Chief Minister.

On 29 June 2022, Uddhav Thackeray resigned as Chief Minister after a faction of MLAs led by Eknath Shinde split from Shiv Sena and allied with the BJP. Subsequently, Eknath Shinde was sworn in as Chief Minister and Devendra Fadnavis as the deputy Chief minister.

== Background ==
The results were out on 21 October 2019 with the Sena-BJP Alliance getting majority, enough to form the government. However, Shiv Sena and BJP had a falling out over the position of Chief Minister, leading Shiv Sena to form an alliance with the opposition, ending their alliance. The new alliance, named Maha Vikas Aghadi, consisted of Congress, Shiv Sena and NCP forming the Government.

== Election schedule ==
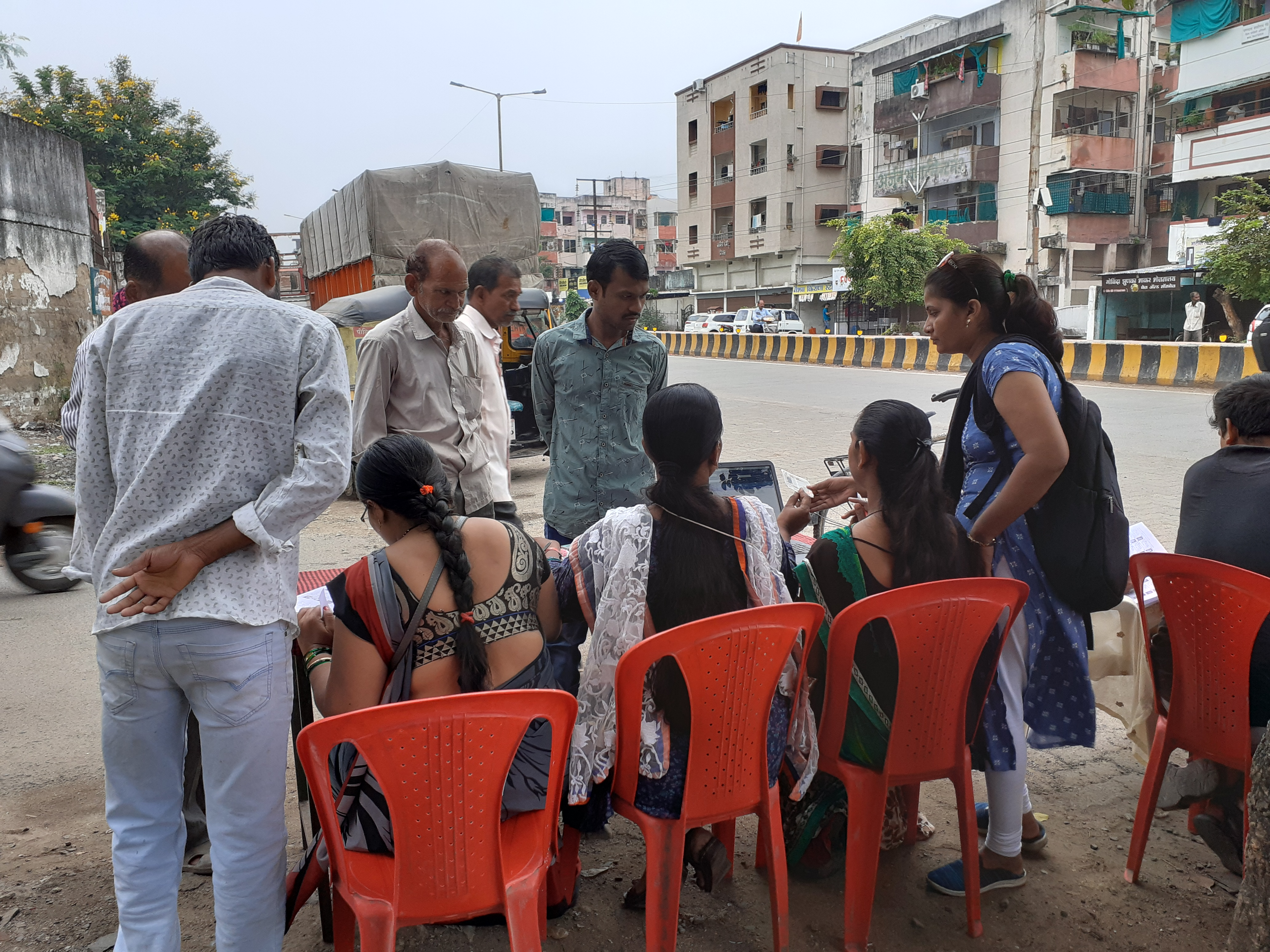
Nagpur (South) voters gather to look up their names in voters' list on voting day morning.

The Election Commission announced the election dates for the Assembly elections in Maharashtra.

Poll Event	Schedule
Notification date	27 September 2019
Last date for filing out nominations	4 October 2019
Scrutiny of nominations	5 October 2019
Last date for withdrawal of Candidature	7 October 2019
Date of Poll	21 October 2019
Counting of Votes	24 October 2019

== Political parties and campaign ==
National Democratic Alliance

Pre-election alliance of National Democratic Alliance (NDA) was formed between Bharatiya Janata Party (BJP) and Shiv Sena (SHS). Later, however, SHS left NDA and formed Three-Party Alliance Government Maha Vikas Aghadi seeing inability to share power with each other.

United Progressive Alliance

Pre-election alliance of United Progressive Alliance (UPA) was formed with Indian National Congress (INC) and Nationalist Congress Party (NCP). INC filled nominations on 145 seats and NCP on 123. Other parties that supported the UPA alliance were Raju Shetti-led Swabhimani Shetkari Saghtana (4 seats), the Peasants and Workers Party (6 seats), Samajwadi Party (3 seats), Bahujan Vikas Aghadi (3 seats) and Ravi Rana-led Swabhiman Sanghatana (1 seat). The opposition finalised common nominee of 2 seats of Mankhatao and Kothrud constituency. Peoples Republican Party (3 seats) and Bahujan Republican Socialist Party (2 seats) will be fielding their candidates on the symbols of INC and NCP. The Samajwadi Party later rescinded its support for the alliance, to contest for 7 seats separately instead. Shiv Sena later joined UPA after leaving NDA.

Others

Various prominent parties in the Maharashtra's political scenario did not join hands with either of the two alliances. This includes Vanchit Bahujan Aghadi that will be contesting all 288 seats. All India Majlis-e-Ittehadul Muslimeen will be contesting from 44 seats, mostly from Muslim predominant constituencies. Maharashtra Navnirman Sena will be contesting from 103 seats.

A total of 5543 nominations were received by Election Commission throughout the state of which about 3239 candidatures were left after others were rejected or had their nominations withdrawn. The Chiplun constituency ha the least candidates (3 candidates), whereas Nanded South constituency had the maximum candidates (38 candidates).

Coalition	Parties	Number of candidates
NDA (288)	Bharatiya Janata Party	152
NDA (288)	Shiv Sena	124
NDA (288)	NDA Others	12
UPA (288)	Indian National Congress	125
UPA (288)	Nationalist Congress Party	125
UPA (288)	UPA Others	38
–	Other	2663
Total		3239

== Maha Yuti Campaign ==
On 30 September 2019, The Bharatiya Janata Party and the Shiv Sena announced that they have finalised their Seat sharing agreements with each other and agreed to fight under the banner of Maha Yuti Alliance. Few days before, Union Home Minister Amit Shah had visited Matoshree (Uddhav Thackeray's Home) and met Uddhav Thackeray for the same.

The parties however were clashing on the subject of 50-50 CM sharing formula.

Seat Sharing Map for MahaYuti

The campaign was led by Maharashtra CM Devendra Fadnavis and then Shiv Sena Chief Uddhav Thackeray

=== Shiv Sena ===
==== Jan- Aashirwad Yatra ====
In order to expand the party's image and to improve its vote share within the state as well as in the Alliance, the Shiv Sena started Jan Aashirwad Yatra headed by party's youth icon and Yuva Sena Chief Aaditya Thackeray. Under this, Aditya Thackeray with his party cadres travelled city-to-city, village-to-village convincing people to vote in favour of his party and the Alliance.

==== Aditya Samwad ====
On par with the Jan Aashirwad Yatra, Aaditya Thackeray interacted with youth community across the state under the Aditya Samwad, there he addressed questions related common problems faced by today's generation and provided solutions for them. Aditya Samwad was promoted and supported by Indian Political Strategist Prashant Kishor and his company I-PAC.

=== Bharatiya Janata Party ===
==== Maha-Janadesh Yatra ====
The BJP launched the Maha-Janadesh Yatra headed by then incumbent CM and BJP Leader Devendra Fadnavis, State President Chandrakant Patil and Union Minister Rajnath Singh. Under the Yatra, the BJP hoped to approach more constituencies and voters.

== Maha Aaghadi Campaign ==
On 16 September 2019, the Indian National Congress and the Nationalist Congress Party sealed their deal for seat sharing arrangements for the elections, both the parties contested on 125 Seats and kept 38 seats for Independents/Smaller Parties, This comes after the INC-NCP lost many heavyweight leaders joining BJP-Sena.

Both the parties were unclear about the CM Candidate from the Alliance.

=== Nationalist Congress Party ===
==== Shiv Swarajya Yatra ====
The NCP flagged off the Shiv Swarajya Yatra from Shivneri, headed by Chief Sharad Pawar, Ajit Pawar and State President Jayant Patil, the Party hoped that it would reach maximum people that would help them to raise strong Anti-Incumbency. The campaign by the Nationalist Congress Party was seen as a try-hard campaign against the mighty Sena-BJP Alliance, which proved correct making the BJP-Sena losing vast constituencies against the Congress-NCP.

The NCP also managed to revive the itself by successfully gaining their stronghold Western Maharashtra back from the Sena-BJP Alliance, the lone-NCP was seen as the main and unexpected competitor against the Sena-BJP. The Sena-BJP though managed to win majority for the second term, but lost core-ministers and constituencies to the NCP.

=== Indian National Congress ===
==== Pol Khol Yatra ====
The INC flagged off the Pol Khol Yatra headed by senior state party leaders like Ashok Chavan, State President Balasaheb Thorat and Madhya Pradesh CM Kamal Nath. The Pol Khol Yatra was intended to expose the ruling Maha Yuti Government's failures and claims. The Yatra did little to help the party in securing fate in Maharashtra.

== Surveys and polls ==
Subsequent to the election, pre-polling and exit polling in all cases but one (India Today-Axis exit poll), was seen to have significantly over-estimated the vote share and seat projections to the ruling right-wing NDA coalition.

=== Vote share ===
Publishing Date	Polling Agency			
Publishing Date	Polling Agency	NDA	UPA	Others
26 September 2019	ABP News – C Voter	46%	30%	24%
18 October 2019	IANS – C Voter	47.3%	19.5%	67.3%

=== Seat projections ===
Poll type	Publishing Date	Polling Agency				Majority
Poll type	Publishing Date	Polling Agency	NDA	UPA	Others	Majority
Opinion polls	26 September 2019	Patriotic Voter	193-199	67	28	53
Opinion polls	26 September 2019	ABP News – C Voter	205	55	28	61
Opinion polls	27 September 2019	NewsX – Pollstrat	210	49	29	66
Opinion polls	17 October 2019	Republic Media – Jan Ki Baat	225-232	48-52	8-11	56
Opinion polls	18 October 2019	ABP News – C Voter	194	86	8	50
Opinion polls	18 October 2019	IANS – C Voter	182-206	72-98	–	38-62
Exit polls		India Today – Axis	166-194	72-90	22-34	22-50
Exit polls		Patriotic Voter	175	84	35	52
Exit polls		News18 – IPSOS	243	41	4	99
Exit polls		Republic Media – Jan Ki Baat	216-230	52-59	8-12	72-86
Exit polls		ABP News – C Voter	204	69	15	60
Exit polls		NewsX – Pollstrat	188-200	74-89	6-10	44-56
Exit polls		Times Now	230	48	10	86
Exit polls		------------ ACTUAL RESULTS------------	161	98	29	

== Region-wise breakup of candidates ==
Region	Total seats				
Region	Total seats	Bharatiya Janata Party	Shiv Sena	Nationalist Congress Party	Indian National Congress
Region	Total seats	Candidates	Candidates	Candidates	Candidates
Western Maharashtra	70	39	31	41	29
Vidarbha	62	50	12	15	47
Marathwada	46	26	20	23	23
Thane+Konkan	39	13	26	17	22
Mumbai	36	17	19	6	30
North Maharashtra	35	20	15	20	15
Total	288	164	124	125	125

== Results ==
=== Party-wise results ===
161	98	29
NDA	UPA	Others

Seat Share
1. NDA (58.7%)
2. UPA (35.8%)
3. Others (5.56%)
Vote Share by parties
1. BJP (25.8%)
2. SS (16.4%)
3. NCP (16.7%)
4. INC (15.9%)
5. VBA (4.58%)
6. MNS (2.25%)
7. Other (18.4%)

Parties and Coalitions	Popular vote			Seats			
Parties and Coalitions	Vote	%	±	Contested	Won	%	±
Bharatiya Janata Party 105 / 288 (36%)	1,41,99,375	25.75	▼2.20	164	105	36.46	▼17
Shiv Sena 56 / 288 (19%)	90,49,789	16.41	▼3.04	126	56	19.44	▼7
Nationalist Congress Party 54 / 288 (19%)	92,16,919	16.71	▼0.62	121	54	18.75	▲13
Indian National Congress 44 / 288 (15%)	87,52,199	15.87	▼2.17	147	44	15.28	▲2
Bahujan Vikas Aaghadi 3 / 288 (1%)	3,68,735	0.67	▲0.05	31	3	1.04	Steady
All India Majlis-e-Ittehadul Muslimeen 2 / 288 (0.7%)	7,37,888	1.34	▲0.41	44	2	0.69	Steady
Samajwadi Party 2 / 288 (0.7%)	1,23,267	0.22	▲0.05	7	2	0.69	▲1
Prahar Janshakti Party 2 / 288 (0.7%)	2,65,320	0.48	▲0.48	26	2	0.69	
Communist Party of India (Marxist) 1 / 288 (0.3%)	2,04,933	0.37	▼0.02	8	1	0.35	Steady
Maharashtra Navnirman Sena 1 / 288 (0.3%)	12,42,135	2.25	▼0.90	101	1	0.35	Steady
Peasants and Workers Party of India 1 / 288 (0.3%)	5,32,366	0.97	▼0.04	24	1	0.35	▼2
Swabhimani Paksha 2 / 288 (0.7%)	2,21,637	0.40	▼0.26	5	1	0.35	▲1
Jan Surajya Shakti 1 / 288 (0.3%)	1,96,284	0.36	▲0.07	4	1	0.35	▲1
Krantikari Shetkari Party 1 / 288 (0.3%)	1,16,943	0.21	▲0.21	1	1	0.35	
Rashtriya Samaj Paksha 1 / 288 (0.3%)	81,169	0.15	▼0.34	6	1	0.35	Steady
Vanchit Bahujan Aghadi	25,23,583	4.58	▲4.58	236	0	0.0	
Independents 13 / 288 (5%)	54,77,653	9.93	▲5.22	1400	13	4.51	▲6
None of the above	7,42,135	1.35	▲0.43				
Total	5,51,50,470	100.00		288	100.00	±0	
Valid votes	5,51,50,470	99.91					
Invalid votes	48,738	0.09					
Votes cast / turnout	5,51,99,208	61.44					
Abstentions	3,46,39,059	38.56					
Registered voters	8,98,38,267						

Bharatiya Janata Party	Shiv Sena	Nationalist Congress Party	Indian National Congress
National Democratic Alliance		United Progressive Alliance	
Devendra Fadnavis	Uddhav Thackeray	Ajit Pawar	Ashok Chavan
25.75%	16.41%	16.71%	15.87%
105(25.75%)	56(16.41%)	54(16.71%)	44(15.87%)
105 / 288 ▼17	56 / 288 ▼07	54 / 288 ▲13	44 / 288 ▲02

=== Alliance fight results ===
Win\2nd	BJP	SS	Others	1st/2nd/-
INC	18/53	17/15	9/2	44/71/10
NCP	25/30	22/17	7/0	54/47/24
Others	12/22	12/24	3/3	
1st/2nd/-	105/55/4	56/51/17		

18/53 indicate INC won with BJP as 2nd in 18 seats, and BJP won over INC as runner-up in 53 seats.

=== Region-wise break up ===
Region	Total seats									Others
Region	Total seats	Bharatiya Janata Party		Shiv Sena		Nationalist Congress Party		Indian National Congress		Others
Region	Total seats	Seats Won		Seats Won		Seats Won		Seats Won		
Western Maharashtra	70	20	▼4	5	▼8	27	▲8	12	▲2	6
Vidarbha	62	29	▼15	4	Steady	6	▲5	15	▲5	8
Marathwada	46	16	▲1	12	▲1	8	Steady	8	▼1	2
Thane+Konkan	39	11	▲1	15	▲1	5	▼3	2	▲1	8
Mumbai	36	16	▲1	14	Steady	1	▲1	2	▼3	1
North Maharashtra	35	13	▼1	6	▼1	7	▲2	5	▼2	4
Total	288	105	▼17	56	▼7	54	▲13	44	▲2	29

=== Votes polled by winning candidates ===
Region								
Region	Bharatiya Janata Party		Shiv Sena		Nationalist Congress Party		Indian National Congress	
Region	Votes polled		Votes polled		Votes polled		Votes polled	
Western Maharashtra	26.8%	▼8.00%	5.56%	▼12.04%	39.5%	▲7.6%	20%	▲9.40%
Vidarbha	48.1%	▼24.4%	7.4%	▲0.30%	9.3%	▲7.2%	22.6%	▲7.70%
Marathwada	40.5%	▼0.60%	18.2%	▼2.20%	18.8%	▲7.1%	18.1%	▼2.50%
Thane+Konkan	32.1%	▲4.70%	32.9%	▲0.40%	13.7%	▼6 %	2.6%	▼0.31%
Mumbai	48.1%	▼3.20%	37.7%	▲4.10%	2.5%	▲2.5%	8.9%	▼2.90%
North Maharashtra	37.6%	▼5.10%	16.11%	▼3.49%	20.8%	▲7.2%	15.6%	▼3.50%
Total	38.87%	▼6.1%	19.65%	▼2.15%	17.43%	▲4.26%	15%	▲1.68%

=== Seat Metrics ===
Alliance	Party	Seats Before	Retained	Gained	Lost	Seats Won
NDA	BJP	122	82	▲23	▼40	105
NDA	Shiv Sena	63	36	▲20	▼27	56
UPA	NCP	41	22	▲32	▼19	54
UPA	INC	42	21	▲23	▼21	44

=== City-wise results ===
City Name	Seats	BJP		SHS		INC		NCP		Oth	
Mumbai	35	16	▲1	14	Steady	4	▼1	1	▲1	1	Steady
Pune	8	6	▼2		Steady		Steady	2	▲2		Steady
Nagpur	6	4	▼2		Steady	2	Steady		Steady		Steady
Thane	5	1	▼1	2	Steady		Steady	1	Steady	1	▲1
Pimpri-Chinchwad	6	2	Steady		▼2	2	▲1	2	▲2		▼1
Nashik	8	3	Steady		▼3	2	▲1	3	▲2		Steady
Kalyan-Dombivli	6	4	▲1	1	Steady		Steady		▼1	1	Steady
Vasai-Virar City MC	2		Steady		Steady		Steady		Steady	2	Steady
Aurangabad	3	1	Steady	2	▲1		Steady		Steady		▼1
Navi Mumbai	2	2	▲1		Steady		Steady		Steady		Steady
Solapur	3	2	Steady		Steady	1	Steady		Steady		Steady
Mira-Bhayandar	1		▼1	1	▲1		Steady		Steady		Steady
Bhiwandi-Nizampur MC	3	1	Steady	1	Steady		Steady	1	Steady		Steady
Jalgaon City	5	2	Steady	2	▲1		Steady	1	Steady		▼1
Amravati	1		▼1		Steady	1	▲1		Steady		Steady
Nanded	3		Steady	1	Steady	2	Steady		Steady		Steady
Kolhapur	6		Steady	1	▼2	3	▲3	2	Steady		▼1
Ulhasnagar	1	1	▲1		Steady		Steady		▼1		Steady
Sangli-Miraj-Kupwad	2	2	Steady		Steady		Steady		Steady		Steady
Malegaon	2		Steady	1	Steady		▼1		Steady	1	Steady
Akola	2	2	Steady		Steady		Steady		Steady		Steady
Latur	1		Steady		Steady	1	Steady		Steady		Steady
Dhule	1		▼1		Steady		Steady		Steady	1	▲1
Ahmednagar	1		Steady		Steady		Steady	1	Steady		Steady
Chandrapur	3	1	▼2		Steady	1	▲1		Steady	1	▲1
Parbhani	3	1	▲1	1	Steady		Steady		▼1	1	Steady
Ichalkaranji	4		▼1		▼2	2	▲2		Steady	2	▲1
Jalna	3	1	▼1		▼1	1	▲1	1	▲1		Steady
Ambarnath	2	1	▲1	1	Steady		Steady		Steady		Steady
Bhusawal	2	1	▼1		Steady	1	▲1		Steady		Steady
Panvel	2	1	Steady	1	▲1		Steady		▼1		Steady
Beed	5	1	▼3		Steady		Steady	4	▲3		Steady
Gondia	2	1	Steady		Steady		Steady	1	Steady		Steady
Satara	7	2	▲2	2	▲1	1	▼1	2	▼2		Steady
Solapur	3	2	Steady		Steady	1	Steady		Steady		Steady
Barshi	1		Steady		Steady		Steady		▼1	1	▲1
Yavatmal	3	2	Steady	1	Steady		Steady		Steady		Steady
Achalpur	1		Steady		Steady		Steady		Steady	1	Steady
Osmanabad	3	1	▲1	2	▲1		▼1		▼1		Steady
Nandurbar	4	2	Steady		Steady	2	Steady		Steady		Steady
Wardha	1	1	Steady		Steady		Steady		Steady		Steady
Udgir	1		▼1		Steady		Steady	1	▲1		Steady
Hinganghat	1	1	Steady		Steady		Steady		Steady		Steady
Total	19	49	▼1	26	▼4	18	▲6	13	▲4	6	▼2

Alliance	Party	Western Maharashtra		Vidarbha		Marathwada		Thane+Konkan		Mumbai		North Maharashtra	
National Democratic Alliance	Bharatiya Janata Party	20 / 70 (29%)	▼04	29 / 62 (47%)	▼15	16 / 46 (35%)	▲1	11 / 39 (28%)	▲1	16 / 36 (44%)	▲01	13 / 35 (37%)	▼01
National Democratic Alliance	Shiv Sena	5 / 70 (7%)	▼08	4 / 62 (6%)	Steady	12 / 46 (26%)	▲1	15 / 39 (38%)	▲01	14 / 36 (39%)	Steady	6 / 35 (17%)	▼01
United Progressive Alliance	Nationalist Congress Party	27 / 70 (39%)	▲08	6 / 62 (10%)	▲5	8 / 46 (17%)	Steady	5 / 39 (13%)	▼03	1 / 36 (3%)	▲01	7 / 35 (20%)	▲02
United Progressive Alliance	Indian National Congress	12 / 70 (17%)	▲2	15 / 62 (24%)	▲5	8 / 46 (17%)	▼1	2 / 39 (5%)	▲01	2 / 36 (6%)	▼03	5 / 35 (14%)	▼02
Others	Others	6 / 70 (9%)	▲3	8 / 62 (13%)	▲4	2 / 46 (4%)	▼4	8 / 39 (21%)	▲1	1 / 36 (3%)	▼1	4 / 35 (11%)	▲2

Alliance-wise Results
Region	Total Seats	National Democratic Alliance		United Progressive Alliance		Others	
Western Maharashtra	70	▼12	25 / 70 (36%)	▲10	39 / 70 (56%)	▲2	6 / 70 (9%)
Vidarbha	62	▼15	33 / 62 (53%)	▲10	21 / 62 (34%)	▲5	8 / 70 (11%)
Marathwada	46	▲2	28 / 46 (61%)	▼1	16 / 46 (35%)	▼1	2 / 46 (4%)
Thane +Konkan	39	▲2	26 / 39 (67%)	▼2	7 / 39 (18%)	▲2	8 / 39 (21%)
Mumbai	36	▲1	30 / 36 (83%)	▼2	3 / 36 (8%)	▼1	1 / 36 (3%)
North Maharashtra	35	▼2	19 / 35 (54%)	Steady	12 / 35 (34%)	▲2	4 / 35 (11%)
Total		▼24	161 / 288 (56%)	▲15	98 / 288 (34%)	▲9	29 / 288 (10%)

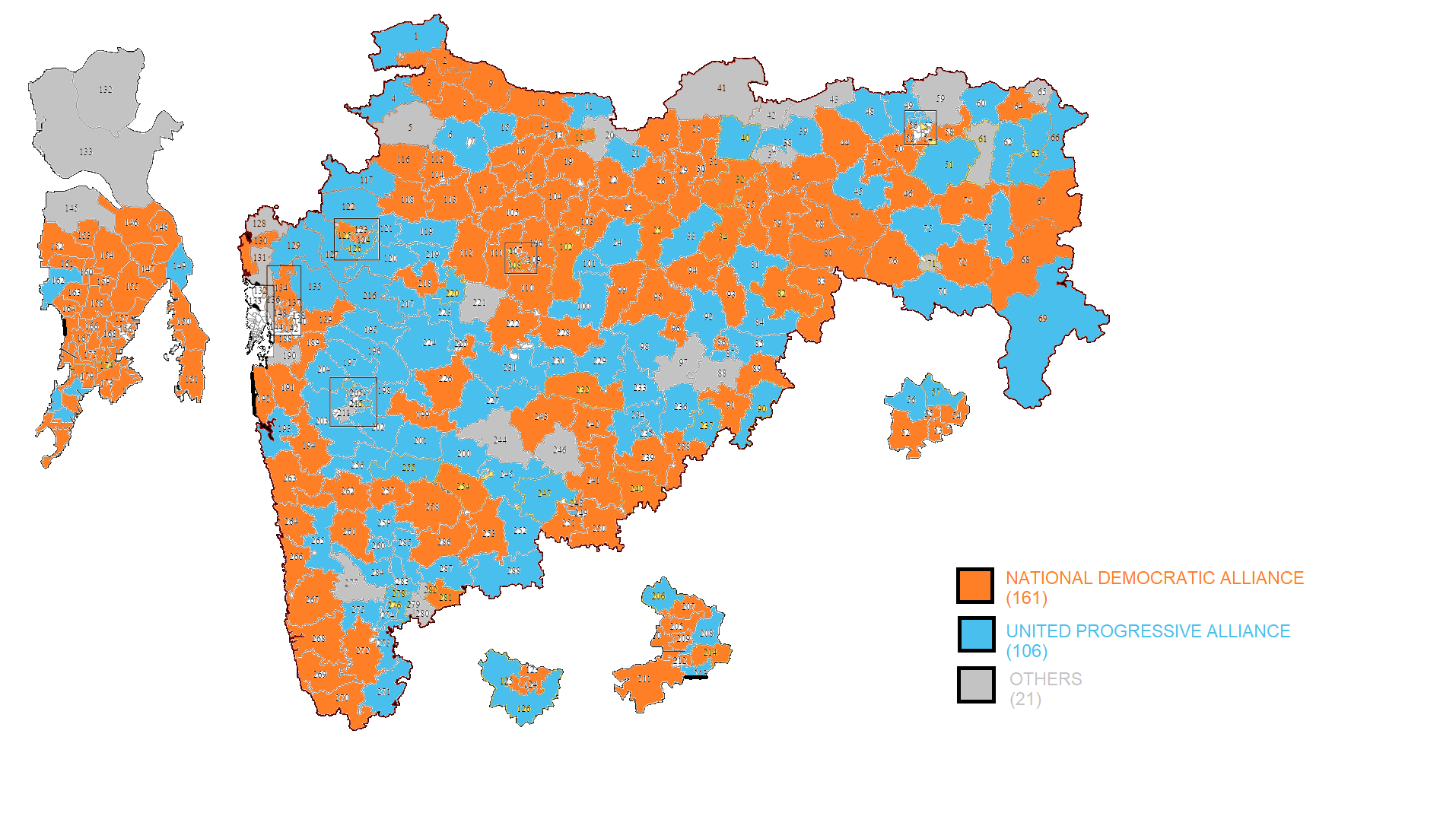

Vidhan Sabha Results
1. Bharatiya Janata Party (36.0%)
2. Shiv Sena (19.0%)
3. Nationalist Congress Party (18.0%)
4. Indian National Congress (15.0%)
5. Others/Independents (12.0%)

=== Division-wise Results ===
Division Name	Seats	BJP		SHS		NCP		INC		Others
Amravati division	30	15	▼03	4	▲1	2	▲1	5	Steady	4
Aurangabad division	46	16	▲1	12	▲1	8	Steady	8	▼1	2
Konkan division	75	27	▲2	29	▲1	6	▼2	4	▼2	9
Nagpur division	32	14	▼12	0	▼1	4	▲4	10	▲5	4
Nashik division	47	16	▼3	6	▼2	13	▲5	7	▼3	5
Pune division	58	17	▼2	5	▼7	21	▲5	10	▲3	5
Total Seats	288	105	▼17	56	▼7	54	▲13	44	▲02	29

=== District-wise results ===
District	Seats			
District	Seats	NDA	UPA	OTH
Nandurbar	4	2	2	0
Dhule	5	2	1	2
Jalgaon	11	8	2	1
Buldhana	7	5	2	0
Akola	5	5	0	0
Washim	3	2	1	0
Amravati	8	1	5	3
Wardha	4	3	1	0
Nagpur	12	6	5	1
Bhandara	3	0	2	1
Gondia	4	1	2	1
Gadchiroli	3	2	1	0
Chandrapur	6	2	3	1
Yavatmal	7	6	1	0
Nanded	9	4	5	0
Hingoli	3	2	1	0
Parbhani	4	2	1	1
Jalna	5	3	2	0
Aurangabad	8	8	0	0
Nashik	15	7	7	1
Palghar	6	1	5	0
Thane	18	13	3	2
Mumbai Suburban	26	22	4	0
Mumbai City	10	8	2	0
Raigad	7	5	1	1
Pune	21	9	12	0
Ahmednagar	12	3	8	1
Beed	6	2	4	0
Latur	6	2	4	0
Osmanabad	4	4	0	0
Solapur	11	5	4	2
Satara	8	4	4	0
Ratnagiri	5	4	1	0
Sindhudurg	3	3	0	0
Kolhapur	10	1	7	2
Sangli	8	3	5	0
Total	288	161	98	29

=== Results by constituency ===
District	Constituency		Winner				Runner Up				Margin	%
District	No.	Name	Candidate	Party	Votes	%	Candidate	Party	Votes	%	Margin	%
Nandurbar	1	Akkalkuwa (ST)	K. C. Padvi	INC	82,770	41.26	Aamshya Padavi	SS	80,674	40.21	2,096	1.05
Nandurbar	2	Shahada (ST)	Rajesh Padvi	BJP	94,931	45.12	Padmakar Valvi	INC	86,940	41.32	7,991	3.80
Nandurbar	3	Nandurbar (ST)	Vijaykumar Gavit	BJP	1,21,605	64.52	Udesingh Kocharu Padvi	INC	51,209	27.17	70,396	37.35
Nandurbar	4	Nawapur (ST)	Shirishkumar Surupsing Naik	INC	74,652	34.30	Sharad Gavit	IND	63,317	29.09	11,335	5.21
Dhule	5	Sakri (ST)	Manjula Gavit	IND	76,166	36.60	Mohan Gokul Suryawanshi	BJP	68,901	33.11	7,265	3.49
Dhule	6	Dhule Rural	Kunal Rohidas Patil	INC	1,25,575	51.18	Maisaheb Patil	BJP	1,11,011	45.25	14,564	5.93
Dhule	7	Dhule City	Shah Faruk Anwar	AIMIM	46,679	28.93	Rajwardhan Kadambande	IND	43,372	26.88	3,307	2.05
Dhule	8	Sindkheda	Jayakumar Jitendrasinh Rawal	BJP	1,13,809	56.74	Bedse Sandeep Tryambakrao	NCP	70,894	35.35	42,915	21.39
Dhule	9	Shirpur (ST)	Kashiram Vechan Pawara	BJP	1,20,403	56.77	Jitendra Yuvraj Thakur	IND	71,229	33.58	49,174	23.19
Jalgaon	10	Chopda (ST)	Latabai Sonawane	SS	78,137	39.18	Jagdishchandra Ramesh Valvi	NCP	57,608	28.89	20,529	10.29
Jalgaon	11	Raver	Shirish Madhukarrao Chaudhari	INC	77,941	38.32	Haribhau Madhav Jawale	BJP	62,332	30.65	15,609	7.67
Jalgaon	12	Bhusawal (SC)	Sanjay Waman Sawakare	BJP	81,689	54.22	Madhu Rajesh Manawatkar	IND	28,675	19.03	53,014	35.19
Jalgaon	13	Jalgaon City	Suresh Damu Bhole	BJP	1,13,310	62.21	Abhishek Shantaram Patil	NCP	48,464	26.61	64,846	35.60
Jalgaon	14	Jalgaon Rural	Gulab Raghunath Patil	SS	1,05,795	53.33	Chandrashekhar Prakash Attarde	IND	59,066	29.78	46,729	23.55
Jalgaon	15	Amalner	Anil Bhaidas Patil	NCP	93,757	50.71	Shirish Hiralal Chaudhari	BJP	85,163	46.06	8,594	4.65
Jalgaon	16	Erandol	Chimanrao Patil	SS	82,650	46.33	Satish Bhaskarrao Patil	NCP	64,648	36.24	18,002	10.09
Jalgaon	17	Chalisgaon	Mangesh Chavan	BJP	86,515	39.69	Rajivdada Deshmukh	NCP	82,228	37.73	4,287	1.96
Jalgaon	18	Pachora	Kishor Appa Patil	SS	75,699	37.58	Amol Panditrao Shinde	IND	73,615	36.55	2,084	1.03
Jalgaon	19	Jamner	Girish Mahajan	BJP	1,14,714	54.95	Sanjay Bhaskarrao Garud	NCP	79,700	38.18	35,014	16.77
Jalgaon	20	Muktainagar	Chandrakant Nimba Patil	IND	91,092	46.42	Eknath Khadse	BJP	89,135	45.43	1,957	0.99
Buldhana	21	Malkapur	Rajesh Panditrao Ekade	INC	86,276	46.32	Chainsukh Madanlal Sancheti	BJP	71,892	38.60	14,384	7.72
Buldhana	22	Buldhana	Sanjay Gaikwad	SS	67,785	37.83	Vijay Haribhau Shinde	VBA	41,710	23.28	26,075	14.55
Buldhana	23	Chikhli	Shweta Mahale	BJP	93,515	48.16	Bondre Rahul Siddhavinayak	INC	86,705	44.65	6,810	3.51
Buldhana	24	Sindkhed Raja	Rajendra Shingne	NCP	81,701	40.58	Shashikant Khedekar	SS	72,763	36.14	8,938	4.44
Buldhana	25	Mehkar (SC)	Sanjay Raimulkar	SS	1,12,038	64.09	Anant Sakharam Wankhede	INC	49,836	28.51	62,202	35.58
Buldhana	26	Khamgaon	Akash Pandurang Fundkar	BJP	90,757	45.80	Dnyaneshwar Purushottam Patil	INC	73,789	37.24	16,968	8.56
Buldhana	27	Jalgaon (Jamod)	Sanjay Kute	BJP	1,02,735	50.43	Swati Sandeep Wakekar	INC	67,504	33.13	35,231	17.30
Akola	28	Akot	Prakash Gunvantrao Bharsakale	BJP	48,586	26.56	Santosh Vasant Rahate	VBA	41,326	22.59	7,260	3.97
Akola	29	Balapur	Nitin Tale	SS	69,343	35.48	Dhairyavardhan Haribhau Pundkar	VBA	50,555	25.87	18,788	9.61
Akola	30	Akola West	Govardhan Mangilal Sharma	BJP	73,262	43.23	Sajid Khan Mannan Khan	INC	70,669	41.70	2,593	1.53
Akola	31	Akola East	Randhir Pralhadrao Sawarkar	BJP	1,00,475	51.97	Bhade Haridas Pandhari	VBA	75,752	39.18	24,723	12.79
Akola	32	Murtizapur (SC)	Harish Pimple	BJP	59,527	33.92	Awachar Pratibha Prabhakar	VBA	57,617	32.84	1,910	1.08
Washim	33	Risod	Amit Subhashrao Zanak	INC	69,875	34.02	Anantrao Vithhalrao Deshmukh	IND	67,734	32.97	2,141	1.05
Washim	34	Washim (SC)	Lakhan Sahadeo Malik	BJP	66,159	32.00	Siddharth Akaramji Deole	VBA	52,464	25.38	13,695	6.62
Washim	35	Karanja	Rajendra Sukhanand Patni	BJP	73,205	39.29	Prakash Dahake	NCP	50,481	27.09	22,724	12.20
Amravati	36	Dhamangaon Railway	Pratap Adsad	BJP	90,832	43.29	Virendra Jagtap	INC	81,313	38.75	9,519	4.54
Amravati	37	Badnera	Ravi Rana	IND	90,460	48.46	Band Priti Sanjay	SS	74,919	40.14	15,541	8.32
Amravati	38	Amravati	Sulbha Khodke	INC	82,581	47.81	Sunil Deshmukh	BJP	64,313	37.23	18,268	10.58
Amravati	39	Teosa	Yashomati Thakur	INC	76,218	43.89	Rajesh Wankhade	SS	65,857	37.92	10,361	5.97
Amravati	40	Daryapur (SC)	Balwant Wankhade	INC	95,889	50.38	Ramesh Ganpatrao Bundile	BJP	65,370	34.34	30,519	16.04
Amravati	41	Melghat (ST)	Rajkumar Dayaram Patel	PHJSP	84,569	46.48	Ramesh Mawaskar	BJP	43,207	23.75	41,362	22.73
Amravati	42	Achalpur	Bachchu Kadu	PHJSP	81,252	43.88	Bablubhau Subhanrao Deshmukh	INC	72,856	39.35	8,396	4.53
Amravati	43	Morshi	Devendra Mahadevrao Bhuyar	SWP	96,152	50.09	Anil Bonde	BJP	86,361	44.99	9,791	5.10
Wardha	44	Arvi	Dadarao Keche	BJP	87,318	49.35	Amar Sharadrao Kale	INC	74,851	42.31	12,467	7.04
Wardha	45	Deoli	Ranjit Kamble	INC	75,345	43.05	Rajesh Bhauraoji Bakane	IND	39,541	22.59	35,804	20.46
Wardha	46	Hinganghat	Samir Trimbakrao Kunawar	BJP	1,03,585	53.83	Mohan Wasudeorao Timande	NCP	53,130	27.61	50,455	26.22
Wardha	47	Wardha	Pankaj Rajesh Bhoyar	BJP	79,739	47.08	Shekhar Pramod Shende	INC	71,806	42.40	7,933	4.68
Nagpur	48	Katol	Anil Deshmukh	NCP	96,842	50.96	Charansing Thakur	BJP	79,785	41.99	17,057	8.97
Nagpur	49	Savner	Sunil Chhatrapal Kedar	INC	1,13,184	53.47	Rajeev Bhaskarrao Potdar	BJP	86,893	41.05	26,291	12.42
Nagpur	50	Hingna	Sameer Meghe	BJP	1,21,305	53.47	Ghodmare Vijaybabu Pandurangji	NCP	75,138	33.12	46,167	20.35
Nagpur	51	Umred (SC)	Raju Devnath Parwe	INC	91,968	46.53	Sudhir Laxman Parwe	BJP	73,939	37.41	18,029	9.12
Nagpur	52	Nagpur South West	Devendra Fadnavis	BJP	1,09,237	56.86	Ashish Deshmukh	INC	59,893	31.18	49,344	25.68
Nagpur	53	Nagpur South	Mohan Mate	BJP	84,339	43.62	Girish Krushnarao Pandav	INC	80,326	41.54	4,013	2.08
Nagpur	54	Nagpur East	Krishna Khopde	BJP	1,03,992	52.35	Purushottam Nagorao Hajare	INC	79,975	40.26	24,017	12.09
Nagpur	55	Nagpur Central	Vikas Kumbhare	BJP	75,692	46.37	Bunty Baba Shelke	INC	71,684	43.91	4,008	2.46
Nagpur	56	Nagpur West	Vikas Thakre	INC	83,252	46.65	Sudhakar Deshmukh	BJP	76,885	43.08	6,367	3.57
Nagpur	57	Nagpur North (SC)	Nitin Raut	INC	86,821	44.35	Milind Mane	BJP	66,127	33.78	20,694	10.57
Nagpur	58	Kamthi	Tekchand Sawarkar	BJP	1,18,182	45.58	Suresh Yadavrao Bhoyar	INC	1,07,066	41.29	11,116	4.29
Nagpur	59	Ramtek	Ashish Jaiswal	IND	67,419	36.54	Dwaram Mallikarjun Reddy	BJP	43,006	23.31	24,413	13.23
Bhandara	60	Tumsar	Raju Manikrao Karemore	NCP	87,190	40.55	Charan Sovinda Waghmare	IND	79,490	36.97	7,700	3.58
Bhandara	61	Bhandara (SC)	Narendra Bhondekar	IND	1,01,717	43.44	Arvind Manohar Bhaladhare	BJP	78,040	33.33	23,677	10.11
Bhandara	62	Sakoli	Nana Patole	INC	95,208	41.63	Parinay Ramesh Fuke	BJP	88,968	38.90	6,240	2.73
Gondiya	63	Arjuni-Morgaon (SC)	Manohar Chandrikapure	NCP	72,400	41.07	Rajkumar Badole	BJP	71,682	40.67	718	0.40
Gondiya	64	Tirora	Vijay Bharatlal Rahangdale	BJP	76,482	45.18	Bopche Ravikant	NCP	50,519	29.84	25,963	15.34
Gondiya	65	Gondiya	Vinod Agrawal	IND	1,02,996	49.19	Gopaldas Shankarlal Agrawal	BJP	75,827	36.21	27,169	12.98
Gondiya	66	Amgaon (ST)	Korote Sahasram Maroti	INC	88,265	48.16	Sanjay Hanmantrao Puram	BJP	80,845	44.12	7,420	4.04
Gadchiroli	67	Armori (ST)	Krishna Damaji Gajbe	BJP	75,077	41.42	Anandrao Gangaram Gedam	INC	53,410	29.46	21,667	11.96
Gadchiroli	68	Gadchiroli (ST)	Deorao Madguji Holi	BJP	97,913	49.88	Chanda Nitin Kodwate	INC	62,572	31.88	35,341	18.00
Gadchiroli	69	Aheri (ST)	Dharamrao Baba Atram	NCP	60,013	36.07	Raje Ambrishrao	BJP	44,555	26.78	15,458	9.29
Chandrapur	70	Rajura	Subhash Dhote	INC	60,228	26.79	Wamanrao Chatap	SBP	57,727	25.67	2,501	1.12
Chandrapur	71	Chandrapur	Kishor Jorgewar	IND	1,17,570	57.96	Nanaji Sitaram Shamkule	BJP	44,909	22.14	72,661	35.82
Chandrapur	72	Ballarpur	Sudhir Mungantiwar	BJP	86,002	42.90	Vishwas Anandrao Zade	INC	52,762	26.32	33,240	16.58
Chandrapur	73	Brahmapuri	Vijay Wadettiwar	INC	96,726	50.00	Sandip Wamanrao Gaddamwar	SS	78,177	40.41	18,549	9.59
Chandrapur	74	Chimur	Bunty Bhangdiya	BJP	87,146	41.94	Satish Manohar Warjukar	INC	77,394	37.25	9,752	4.69
Chandrapur	75	Warora	Pratibha Dhanorkar	INC	63,862	34.40	Sanjay Wamanrao Deotale	SS	53,665	28.91	10,197	5.49
Yavatmal	76	Wani	Sanjivreddy Bodkurwar	BJP	67,710	32.38	Wamanrao Kasawar	INC	39,915	19.09	27,795	13.29
Yavatmal	77	Ralegaon (ST)	Ashok Uike	BJP	90,823	45.95	Vasant Purke	INC	80,948	40.95	9,875	5.00
Yavatmal	78	Yavatmal	Madan Yerawar	BJP	80,425	37.28	Balasaheb Mangulkar	INC	78,172	36.24	2,253	1.04
Yavatmal	79	Digras	Sanjay Rathod	SS	1,36,824	60.60	Sanjay Deshmukh	IND	73,217	32.43	63,607	28.17
Yavatmal	80	Arni (ST)	Sandip Prabhakar Dhurve	BJP	81,599	38.62	Shivajirao Moghe	INC	78,446	37.13	3,153	1.49
Yavatmal	81	Pusad	Indranil Naik	NCP	89,143	47.05	Nilay Madhukar Naik	BJP	79,442	41.93	9,701	5.12
Yavatmal	82	Umarkhed (SC)	Namdev Sasane	BJP	87,337	44.40	Khadse Vijayrao Yadavrao	INC	78,050	39.68	9,287	4.72
Nanded	83	Kinwat	Bhimrao Keram	BJP	89,628	48.56	Pradeep Hemsingh Jadhav	NCP	76,356	41.37	13,272	7.19
Nanded	84	Hadgaon	Jawalgaonkar Patil	INC	74,325	37.96	Baburao Kadam	IND	60,962	31.13	13,363	6.83
Nanded	85	Bhokar	Ashok Chavan	INC	1,40,559	67.78	Bapusaheb Gorthekar	BJP	43,114	20.79	97,445	46.99
Nanded	86	Nanded North	Balaji Kalyankar	SS	62,884	33.18	D. P. Sawant	INC	50,778	26.80	12,106	6.38
Nanded	87	Nanded South	Mohanrao Marotrao Hambarde	INC	46,943	25.68	Deelip Venkatrao Kandkurte	IND	43,351	23.71	3,592	1.97
Nanded	88	Loha	Shyamsundar Shinde	PWPI	1,01,668	52.76	Shivkumar Narayanrao Narangale	VBA	37,306	19.36	64,362	33.40
Nanded	89	Naigaon	Rajesh Sambhaji Pawar	BJP	1,17,750	56.07	Vasantrao Balwantrao Chavan	INC	63,366	30.17	54,384	25.90
Nanded	90	Deglur (SC)	Raosaheb Antapurkar	INC	89,407	50.19	Sabne Subhash Pirajirao	SS	66,974	37.60	22,433	12.59
Nanded	91	Mukhed	Tushar Rathod	BJP	1,02,573	55.14	Bhausaheb Khushalrao Patil	INC	70,710	38.01	31,863	17.13
Hingoli	92	Basmath	Chandrakant Nawghare	NCP	75,321	34.59	Shivaji Munjajirao Jadhav	IND	67,070	30.80	8,251	3.79
Hingoli	93	Kalamnuri	Santosh Bangar	SS	82,515	39.04	Ajit Magar	VBA	66,137	31.29	16,378	7.75
Hingoli	94	Hingoli	Tanaji Sakharamji Mutkule	BJP	95,318	47.58	Patil Bhaurao Baburao	INC	71,253	35.57	24,065	12.01
Parbhani	95	Jintur	Meghana Bordikar	BJP	1,16,913	45.46	Bhambale Vijay Manikrao	NCP	1,13,196	44.02	3,717	1.44
Parbhani	96	Parbhani	Rahul Vedprakash Patil	SS	1,04,584	54.40	Mohammad Gouse Zain	VBA	22,794	11.86	81,790	42.54
Parbhani	97	Gangakhed	Ratnakar Gutte	RSPS	81,169	30.07	Kadam Vishal Vijaykumar	SS	63,111	23.38	18,058	6.69
Parbhani	98	Pathri	Suresh Warpudkar	INC	1,05,625	44.69	Phad Mohan Madhavrao	BJP	90,851	38.44	14,774	6.25
Jalna	99	Partur	Babanrao Lonikar	BJP	1,06,321	52.21	Jethliya Sureshkumar Kanhaiyalal	INC	80,379	39.47	25,942	12.74
Jalna	100	Ghansawangi	Rajesh Tope	NCP	1,07,849	47.09	Hikmat Udhan	SS	1,04,440	45.60	3,409	1.49
Jalna	101	Jalna	Kailas Gorantyal	INC	91,835	49.28	Arjun Khotkar	SS	66,497	35.69	25,338	13.59
Jalna	102	Badnapur (SC)	Narayan Tilakchand Kuche	BJP	1,05,312	49.77	Choudhari Rupkumar	NCP	86,700	40.98	18,612	8.79
Jalna	103	Bhokardan	Santosh Danve	BJP	1,18,539	54.65	Chandrakant Pundlikrao Danwe	NCP	86,049	39.67	32,490	14.98
Aurangabad	104	Sillod	Abdul Sattar	SS	1,23,383	51.75	Prabhakar Manikrao Palodkar	IND	99,002	41.52	24,381	10.23
Aurangabad	105	Kannad	Udaysingh Rajput	SS	79,225	36.72	Harshvardhan Jadhav	IND	60,535	28.06	18,690	8.66
Aurangabad	106	Phulambri	Haribhau Bagade	BJP	1,06,190	46.56	Kalyan Kale	INC	90,916	39.87	15,274	6.69
Aurangabad	107	Aurangabad Central	Pradeep Jaiswal	SS	82,217	42.27	Naseeruddin Taquiuddin Siddioqui	AIMIM	68,325	35.12	13,892	7.15
Aurangabad	108	Aurangabad West (SC)	Sanjay Shirsat	SS	83,792	42.00	Raju Ramrao Shinde	IND	43,347	21.72	40,445	20.28
Aurangabad	109	Aurangabad East	Atul Save	BJP	93,966	48.10	Abdul Gaffar Quadri Syed	AIMIM	80,036	40.97	13,930	7.13
Aurangabad	110	Paithan	Sandipanrao Bhumre	SS	83,403	39.11	Dattatray Radhakisan Gorde	NCP	69,264	32.48	14,139	6.63
Aurangabad	111	Gangapur	Prashant Bamb	BJP	1,07,193	52.68	Santosh Annasaheb Mane	NCP	72,222	35.49	34,971	17.19
Aurangabad	112	Vaijapur	Ramesh Bornare	SS	98,183	50.11	Abhay Kailasrao Patil	NCP	39,020	19.91	59,163	30.20
Nashik	113	Nandgaon	Suhas Kande	SS	85,275	44.85	Pankaj Bhujbal	NCP	71,386	37.54	13,889	7.31
Nashik	114	Malegaon Central	Mhd. Ismail Abdul Khalique	AIMIM	1,17,242	58.52	Shaikh Aasif Shaikh Rashid	INC	78,723	39.29	38,519	19.23
Nashik	115	Malegaon Outer	Dadaji Bhuse	SS	1,21,252	59.59	Tushar Ramkrushna Shewale	INC	73,568	36.16	47,684	23.43
Nashik	116	Baglan (ST)	Dilip Manglu Borse	BJP	94,683	56.95	Dipika Sanjay Chavan	NCP	60,989	36.68	33,694	20.27
Nashik	117	Kalwan (ST)	Nitin Arjun Pawar	NCP	86,877	44.55	Jiva Pandu Gavit	CPI(M)	80,281	41.17	6,596	3.38
Nashik	118	Chandvad	Rahul Daulatrao Aher	BJP	1,03,454	53.71	Kotwal Shirishkumar Vasantrao	INC	75,710	39.30	27,744	14.41
Nashik	119	Yevla	Chhagan Bhujbal	NCP	1,26,237	62.66	Sambhaji Pawar	SS	69,712	34.61	56,525	28.05
Nashik	120	Sinnar	Manikrao Kokate	NCP	97,011	48.77	Rajabhau Waje	SS	94,939	47.72	2,072	1.05
Nashik	121	Niphad	Diliprao Shankarrao Bankar	NCP	96,354	47.17	Anil Sahebrao Kadam	SS	78,686	38.52	17,668	8.65
Nashik	122	Dindori (ST)	Narhari Zirwal	NCP	1,24,520	59.53	Bhaskar Gopal Gavit	SS	63,707	30.46	60,813	29.07
Nashik	123	Nashik East	Rahul Uttamrao Dhikale	BJP	86,304	47.68	Balasaheb Mahadu Sanap	NCP	74,304	41.05	12,000	6.63
Nashik	124	Nashik Central	Devayani Farande	BJP	73,460	47.30	Hemlata Ninad Patil	INC	45,062	29.01	28,398	18.29
Nashik	125	Nashik West	Seema Mahesh Hiray	BJP	78,041	35.65	Apoorva Prashant Hiray	NCP	68,295	31.19	9,746	4.46
Nashik	126	Devlali (SC)	Saroj Ahire	NCP	84,326	58.09	Yogesh Gholap	SS	42,624	29.36	41,702	28.73
Nashik	127	Igatpuri (ST)	Hiraman Khoskar	INC	86,561	51.74	Nirmala Ramesh Gavit	SS	55,006	32.88	31,555	18.86
Palghar	128	Dahanu (ST)	Vinod Bhiva Nikole	CPI(M)	72,114	43.45	Dhanare Paskal Janya	BJP	67,407	40.61	4,707	2.84
Palghar	129	Vikramgad (ST)	Sunil Chandrakant Bhuasara	NCP	88,425	48.36	Hemant Vishnu Savara	BJP	67,026	36.66	21,399	11.70
Palghar	130	Palghar (ST)	Shrinivas Vanga	SS	68,040	52.58	Yogesh Shankar Nam	INC	27,735	21.43	40,305	31.15
Palghar	131	Boisar (ST)	Rajesh Patil	BVA	78,703	36.98	Vilas Tare	SS	75,951	35.68	2,752	1.30
Palghar	132	Nalasopara	Kshitij Thakur	BVA	1,49,868	55.70	Pradeep Sharma	SS	1,06,139	39.45	43,729	16.25
Palghar	133	Vasai	Hitendra Thakur	BVA	1,02,950	54.18	Vijay Govind Patil	SS	76,955	40.50	25,995	13.68
Thane	134	Bhiwandi Rural (ST)	Shantaram More	SS	83,567	48.36	Shubhangi Ramesh Govari	MNS	39,058	22.60	44,509	25.76
Thane	135	Shahapur (ST)	Daulat Daroda	NCP	76,053	46.96	Pandurang Barora	SS	60,949	37.63	15,104	9.33
Thane	136	Bhiwandi West	Mahesh Prabhakar Choughule	BJP	58,857	42.38	Mohd. Khalid	IND	43,945	31.65	14,912	10.73
Thane	137	Bhiwandi East	Rais Shaikh	SP	45,537	35.23	Rupesh Laxman Mhatre	SS	44,223	34.21	1,314	1.02
Thane	138	Kalyan West	Vishwanath Bhoir	SS	65,486	34.50	Narendra Pawar	IND	43,209	22.77	22,277	11.73
Thane	139	Murbad	Kisan Kathore	BJP	1,74,068	74.75	Pramod Vinayak Hindurao	NCP	38,028	16.33	1,36,040	58.42
Thane	140	Ambernath (SC)	Balaji Kinikar	SS	60,083	44.87	Rohit Chandrakant Salve	INC	30,789	22.99	29,294	21.88
Thane	141	Ulhasnagar	Kumar Ailani	BJP	43,666	39.84	Jyoti Kalani	NCP	41,662	38.01	2,004	1.83
Thane	142	Kalyan East	Ganpat Gaikwad	BJP	60,332	39.94	Dhananjay Baburao Bodare	IND	48,075	31.82	12,257	8.12
Thane	143	Dombivali	Ravindra Chavan	BJP	86,227	59.33	Mandar Shrikant Halbe	MNS	44,916	30.91	41,311	28.42
Thane	144	Kalyan Rural	Pramod Ratan Patil	MNS	93,927	47.46	Mhatre Ramesh Sukrya	SS	86,773	43.84	7,154	3.62
Thane	145	Mira Bhayandar	Geeta Bharat Jain	IND	79,575	37.60	Narendra Mehta	BJP	64,049	30.26	15,526	7.34
Thane	146	Ovala - Majiwada	Pratap Sarnaik	SS	1,17,593	60.72	Chavan Vikrant Bhimsen	INC	33,585	17.34	84,008	43.38
Thane	147	Kopri-Pachpakhadi	Eknath Shinde	SS	1,13,497	65.36	Ghadigaonkar Sanjay Pandurang	INC	24,197	13.93	89,300	51.43
Thane	148	Thane	Sanjay Mukund Kelkar	BJP	92,298	51.78	Avinash Anant Jadhav	MNS	72,874	40.88	19,424	10.90
Thane	149	Mumbra-Kalwa	Jitendra Awhad	NCP	1,09,283	61.03	Deepali Jahangir Sayed	SS	33,644	18.79	75,639	42.24
Thane	150	Airoli	Ganesh Naik	BJP	1,14,645	58.37	Ganesh Raghu Shinde	NCP	36,154	18.41	78,491	39.96
Thane	151	Belapur	Manda Vijay Mhatre	BJP	87,858	50.34	Ashok Ankush Gawade	NCP	44,261	25.36	43,597	24.98
Mumbai Suburban	152	Borivali	Sunil Rane	BJP	1,23,712	74.54	Kumar Khilare	INC	28,691	17.29	95,021	57.25
Mumbai Suburban	153	Dahisar	Manisha Ashok Chaudhary	BJP	87,607	64.87	Arun Sawant	INC	23,690	17.54	63,917	47.33
Mumbai Suburban	154	Magathane	Prakash Surve	SS	90,206	59.59	Nayan Pradeep Kadam	MNS	41,060	27.13	49,146	32.46
Mumbai Suburban	155	Mulund	Mihir Kotecha	BJP	87,253	56.46	Harshala Rajesh Chavan	MNS	29,905	19.35	57,348	37.11
Mumbai Suburban	156	Vikhroli	Sunil Raut	SS	62,794	49.08	Dhananjay Pisal	NCP	34,953	27.32	27,841	21.76
Mumbai Suburban	157	Bhandup West	Ramesh Korgaonkar	SS	71,955	45.17	Sandeep Prabhakar Jalgaonkar	MNS	42,782	26.86	29,173	18.31
Mumbai Suburban	158	Jogeshwari East	Ravindra Waikar	SS	90,654	60.86	Sunil Bisan Kumre	INC	31,867	21.39	58,787	39.47
Mumbai Suburban	159	Dindoshi	Sunil Prabhu	SS	82,203	52.61	Vidya Chavan	NCP	37,692	24.13	44,511	28.48
Mumbai Suburban	160	Kandivali East	Atul Bhatkhalkar	BJP	85,152	63.22	Ajanta Rajpati Yadav	INC	32,798	24.35	52,354	38.87
Mumbai Suburban	161	Charkop	Yogesh Sagar	BJP	1,08,202	71.10	Kalu Budhelia	INC	34,453	22.64	73,749	48.46
Mumbai Suburban	162	Malad West	Aslam Shaikh	INC	79,514	50.87	Thakur Ramesh Singh	BJP	69,131	44.22	10,383	6.65
Mumbai Suburban	163	Goregaon	Vidya Thakur	BJP	81,233	53.34	Mohite Yuvraj Ganesh	INC	32,326	21.23	48,907	32.11
Mumbai Suburban	164	Versova	Bharati Lavekar	BJP	41,057	33.98	Baldev Khosa	INC	35,871	29.69	5,186	4.29
Mumbai Suburban	165	Andheri West	Ameet Satam	BJP	65,615	49.23	Ashok Jadhav	INC	46,653	35.00	18,962	14.23
Mumbai Suburban	166	Andheri East	Rutuja Latke	SS	62,773	42.67	Murji Patel	IND	45,808	31.14	16,965	11.53
Mumbai Suburban	167	Vile Parle	Parag Alavani	BJP	84,991	61.03	Jayanti Jivabhai Siroya	INC	26,564	19.07	58,427	41.96
Mumbai Suburban	168	Chandivali	Dilip Lande	SS	85,879	43.74	Naseem Khan	INC	85,470	43.53	409	0.21
Mumbai Suburban	169	Ghatkopar West	Ram Kadam	BJP	70,263	47.01	Sanjay Bhalerao	IND	41,474	27.75	28,789	19.26
Mumbai Suburban	170	Ghatkopar East	Parag Shah	BJP	73,054	57.70	Satish Sitaram Pawar	MNS	19,735	15.59	53,319	42.11
Mumbai Suburban	171	Mankhurd Shivaji Nagar	Abu Azmi	SP	69,082	48.18	Vithal Govind Lokare	SS	43,481	30.32	25,601	17.86
Mumbai Suburban	172	Anushakti Nagar	Nawab Malik	NCP	65,217	46.84	Tukaram Ramkrishna Kate	SS	52,466	37.68	12,751	9.16
Mumbai Suburban	173	Chembur	Prakash Phaterpekar	SS	53,264	40.15	Chandrakant Handore	INC	34,246	25.82	19,018	14.33
Mumbai Suburban	174	Kurla (SC)	Mangesh Kudalkar	SS	55,049	44.60	Milind Anna Kamble	NCP	34,036	27.57	21,013	17.03
Mumbai Suburban	175	Kalina	Sanjay Potnis	SS	43,319	36.53	George Abraham	INC	38,388	32.37	4,931	4.16
Mumbai Suburban	176	Vandre East	Zeeshan Siddique	INC	38,337	30.28	Vishwanath Mahadeshwar	SS	32,547	25.71	5,790	4.57
Mumbai Suburban	177	Vandre West	Ashish Shelar	BJP	74,816	57.11	Asif Zakaria	INC	48,309	36.88	26,507	20.23
Mumbai City	178	Dharavi (SC)	Varsha Gaikwad	INC	53,954	45.31	Ashish Vasant More	SS	42,130	35.38	11,824	9.93
Mumbai City	179	Sion Koliwada	R. Tamil Selvan	BJP	54,845	42.24	Ganesh Kumar Yadav	INC	40,894	31.49	13,951	10.75
Mumbai City	180	Wadala	Kalidas Kolambkar	BJP	56,485	52.01	Shivkumar Uday Lad	INC	25,640	23.61	30,845	28.40
Mumbai City	181	Mahim	Sada Sarvankar	SS	61,337	49.45	Sandeep Sudhakar Deshpande	MNS	42,690	34.42	18,647	15.03
Mumbai City	182	Worli	Aaditya Thackeray	SS	89,248	69.14	Suresh Mane	NCP	21,821	16.91	67,427	52.23
Mumbai City	183	Shivadi	Ajay Choudhari	SS	77,687	57.27	Santosh Raghunath Nalawade	MNS	38,350	28.27	39,337	29.00
Mumbai City	184	Byculla	Yamini Jadhav	SS	51,180	41.03	Waris Pathan	AIMIM	31,157	24.98	20,023	16.05
Mumbai City	185	Malabar Hill	Mangal Lodha	BJP	93,538	75.87	Heera Navaji Devasi	INC	21,666	17.57	71,872	58.30
Mumbai City	186	Mumbadevi	Amin Patel	INC	58,952	54.87	Pandurang Ganpat Sakpal	SS	35,297	32.85	23,655	22.02
Mumbai City	187	Colaba	Rahul Narwekar	BJP	57,420	53.85	Bhai Jagtap	INC	41,225	38.66	16,195	15.19
Raigad	188	Panvel	Prashant Thakur	BJP	1,79,109	59.21	Haresh Manohar Keni	PWPI	86,379	28.56	92,730	30.65
Raigad	189	Karjat	Mahendra Thorve	SS	1,02,208	51.04	Suresh Narayan Lad	NCP	84,162	42.03	18,046	9.01
Raigad	190	Uran	Mahesh Baldi	IND	74,549	34.05	Manohar Bhoir	SS	68,839	31.44	5,710	2.61
Raigad	191	Pen	Ravisheth Patil	BJP	1,12,380	52.05	Dhairyashil Patil	PWPI	88,329	40.91	24,051	11.14
Raigad	192	Alibag	Mahendra Dalvi	SS	1,11,946	52.11	Subhash Alias Panditshet Patil	PWPI	79,022	36.78	32,924	15.33
Raigad	193	Shrivardhan	Aditi Tatkare	NCP	92,074	58.55	Vinod Ghosalkar	SS	52,453	33.36	39,621	25.19
Raigad	194	Mahad	Bharatshet Gogawale	SS	1,02,273	53.57	Manik Motiram Jagtap	INC	80,698	42.27	21,575	11.30
Pune	195	Junnar	Atul Vallabh Benke	NCP	74,958	37.01	Sharad Sonavane	SS	65,890	32.53	9,068	4.48
Pune	196	Ambegaon	Dilip Walse Patil	NCP	1,26,120	66.37	Bankhele Rajaram Bhivsen	SS	59,345	31.23	66,775	35.14
Pune	197	Khed Alandi	Dilip Mohite	NCP	96,866	43.88	Suresh Gore	SS	63,624	28.82	33,242	15.06
Pune	198	Shirur	Ashok Raosaheb Pawar	NCP	1,45,131	56.10	Baburao Pacharne	BJP	1,03,627	40.06	41,504	16.04
Pune	199	Daund	Rahul Kul	BJP	1,03,664	48.43	Ramesh Kisanrao Thorat	NCP	1,02,918	48.08	746	0.35
Pune	200	Indapur	Dattatray Vithoba Bharne	NCP	1,14,960	49.23	Harshvardhan Patil	BJP	1,11,850	47.90	3,110	1.33
Pune	201	Baramati	Ajit Pawar	NCP	1,95,641	83.24	Gopichand Padalkar	BJP	30,376	12.92	1,65,265	70.32
Pune	202	Purandar	Sanjay Jagtap	INC	1,30,710	54.91	Vijay Shivtare	SS	99,306	41.71	31,404	13.20
Pune	203	Bhor	Sangram Anantrao Thopate	INC	1,08,925	47.72	Kuldip Sudam Konde	SS	99,719	43.69	9,206	4.03
Pune	204	Maval	Sunil Shelke	NCP	1,67,712	67.56	Bala Bhegade	BJP	73,770	29.72	93,942	37.84
Pune	205	Chinchwad	Laxman Pandurang Jagtap	BJP	1,50,723	54.17	Kalate Rahul Tanaji	IND	1,12,225	40.34	38,498	13.83
Pune	206	Pimpri (SC)	Anna Bansode	NCP	86,985	48.98	Gautam Chabukswar	SS	67,177	37.83	19,808	11.15
Pune	207	Bhosari	Mahesh Landge	BJP	1,59,295	60.46	Lande Vilas Vithoba	IND	81,728	31.02	77,567	29.44
Pune	208	Vadgaon Sheri	Sunil Tingre	NCP	97,708	45.52	Jagdish Mulik	BJP	92,752	43.21	4,956	2.31
Pune	209	Shivajinagar	Siddharth Shirole	BJP	58,727	43.80	Datta Bahirat	INC	53,603	39.98	5,124	3.82
Pune	210	Kothrud	Chandrakant Patil	BJP	1,05,246	53.93	Adv. Kishor Nana Shinde	MNS	79,751	40.87	25,495	13.06
Pune	211	Khadakwasala	Bhimrao Tapkir	BJP	1,20,518	48.14	Dodke Sachin Shivaji	NCP	1,17,923	47.10	2,595	1.04
Pune	212	Parvati	Madhuri Misal	BJP	97,012	55.82	Ashwini Nitin Kadam	NCP	60,245	34.67	36,767	21.15
Pune	213	Hadapsar	Chetan Tupe	NCP	92,326	38.76	Yogesh Tilekar	BJP	89,506	37.58	2,820	1.18
Pune	214	Pune Cantonment (SC)	Sunil Kamble	BJP	52,160	41.21	Ramesh Anandrao Bagwe	INC	47,148	37.25	5,012	3.96
Pune	215	Kasba Peth	Mukta Tilak	BJP	75,492	50.30	Arvind Shinde	INC	47,296	31.52	28,196	18.78
Ahmednagar	216	Akole (ST)	Kiran Lahamate	NCP	1,13,414	65.08	Vaibhav Madhukar Pichad	BJP	55,725	31.98	57,689	33.10
Ahmednagar	217	Sangamner	Balasaheb Thorat	INC	1,25,380	64.39	Navale Sahebrao Ramchandra	SS	63,128	32.42	62,252	31.97
Ahmednagar	218	Shirdi	Radhakrishna Vikhe Patil	BJP	1,32,316	70.86	Suresh Jagannath Thorat	INC	45,292	24.26	87,024	46.60
Ahmednagar	219	Kopargaon	Ashutosh Ashokrao Kale	NCP	87,566	43.23	Snehalata Kolhe	BJP	86,744	42.83	822	0.40
Ahmednagar	220	Shrirampur (SC)	Lahu Kanade	INC	93,906	50.87	Bhausaheb Kamble	SS	74,912	40.58	18,994	10.29
Ahmednagar	221	Nevasa	Shankarrao Gadakh	KSP	1,16,943	55.27	Dadasaheb Damodhar Murkute	BJP	86,280	40.78	30,663	14.49
Ahmednagar	222	Shevgaon	Monika Rajiv Rajale	BJP	1,12,509	49.73	Dhakne Prataprao Babanrao	NCP	98,215	43.41	14,294	6.32
Ahmednagar	223	Rahuri	Prajakt Tanpure	NCP	1,09,234	54.31	Shivaji Bhanudas Kardile	BJP	85,908	42.72	23,326	11.59
Ahmednagar	224	Parner	Nilesh Dnyandev Lanke	NCP	1,39,963	61.70	Vijayrao Bhaskarrao Auti	SS	80,125	35.32	59,838	26.38
Ahmednagar	225	Ahmednagar City	Sangram Arun Jagtap	NCP	81,217	47.73	Anil Rathod	SS	70,078	41.19	11,139	6.54
Ahmednagar	226	Shrigonda	Babanrao Pachpute	BJP	1,03,258	48.87	Ghanshyam Prataprao Shelar	NCP	98,508	46.62	4,750	2.25
Ahmednagar	227	Karjat Jamkhed	Rohit Pawar	NCP	1,35,824	56.98	Ram Shinde	BJP	92,477	38.80	43,347	18.18
Beed	228	Georai	Laxman Pawar	BJP	99,625	38.09	Vijaysinh Pandit	NCP	92,833	35.49	6,792	2.60
Beed	229	Majalgaon	Prakashdada Solanke	NCP	1,11,566	48.86	Ramesh Baburao Kokate	BJP	98,676	43.22	12,890	5.64
Beed	230	Beed	Sandeep Kshirsagar	NCP	99,934	45.16	Jaydattaji Kshirsagar	SS	97,950	44.26	1,984	0.90
Beed	231	Ashti	Balasaheb Ajabe	NCP	1,26,756	52.63	Bhimrao Anandrao Dhonde	BJP	1,00,931	41.91	25,825	10.72
Beed	232	Kaij (SC)	Namita Mundada	BJP	1,23,433	53.74	Pruthviraj Shivaji Sathe	NCP	90,524	39.41	32,909	14.33
Beed	233	Parli	Dhananjay Munde	NCP	1,22,114	54.45	Pankaja Munde	BJP	91,413	40.76	30,701	13.69
Latur	234	Latur Rural	Dhiraj Deshmukh	INC	1,35,006	67.64	Sachin Alias Ravi Ramraje Deshmukh	SS	13,524	6.78	1,21,482	60.86
Latur	235	Latur City	Amit Deshmukh	INC	1,11,156	52.48	Shailesh Govindkumar Lahoti	BJP	70,741	33.40	40,415	19.08
Latur	236	Ahmadpur	Babasaheb Mohanrao Patil	NCP	84,636	39.37	Vinayakrao Kishanrao Jadhav Patil	BJP	55,445	25.79	29,191	13.58
Latur	237	Udgir (SC)	Sanjay Bansode	NCP	96,366	53.64	Anil Sadashiv Kamble	BJP	75,787	42.18	20,579	11.46
Latur	238	Nilanga	Sambhaji Patil Nilangekar	BJP	97,324	49.32	Shivajirao Patil Nilangekar	INC	65,193	33.04	32,131	16.28
Latur	239	Ausa	Abhimanyu Dattatray Pawar	BJP	95,340	50.89	Basavraj Madhavrao Patil	INC	68,626	36.63	26,714	14.26
Osmanabad	240	Umarga (SC)	Dnyanraj Chougule	SS	86,773	51.27	Bhalerao Dattu Rohidas	INC	61,187	36.15	25,586	15.12
Osmanabad	241	Tuljapur	Ranajagjitsinha Patil	BJP	99,034	43.31	Madhukarrao Chavan	INC	75,865	33.18	23,169	10.13
Osmanabad	242	Osmanabad	Kailas Patil	SS	87,488	40.43	Sanjay Prakash Nimbalkar	NCP	74,021	34.20	13,467	6.23
Osmanabad	243	Paranda	Tanaji Sawant	SS	1,06,674	49.62	Rahul Maharudra Mote	NCP	73,772	34.32	32,902	15.30
Solapur	244	Karmala	Sanjaymama Shinde	IND	78,822	36.65	Narayan Patil	IND	73,328	34.09	5,494	2.56
Solapur	245	Madha	Babanrao Vitthalrao Shinde	NCP	1,42,573	62.78	Kokate Sanjay Shivlal	SS	74,328	32.73	68,245	30.05
Solapur	246	Barshi	Rajendra Raut	IND	95,482	42.57	Dilip Gangadhar Sopal	SS	92,406	41.19	3,076	1.38
Solapur	247	Mohol (SC)	Yashwant Mane	NCP	90,532	44.86	Kshirsagar Nagnath Dattatray	SS	68,833	34.11	21,699	10.75
Solapur	248	Solapur City North	Vijay Deshmukh	BJP	96,529	63.64	Anand Baburao Chandanshive	VBA	23,461	15.47	73,068	48.17
Solapur	249	Solapur City Central	Praniti Shinde	INC	51,440	30.58	Haji Farooq Maqbool Shabdi	AIMIM	38,721	23.02	12,719	7.56
Solapur	250	Akkalkot	Sachin Kalyanshetti	BJP	1,19,437	55.95	Siddharam Satlingappa Mhetre	INC	82,668	38.72	36,769	17.23
Solapur	251	Solapur South	Subhash Deshmukh	BJP	87,223	53.65	Moulali Bashumiya Sayyed	INC	57,976	35.66	29,247	17.99
Solapur	252	Pandharpur	Bharat Bhalke	NCP	89,787	37.48	Paricharak Sudhakar Ramchandra	BJP	76,426	31.90	13,361	5.58
Solapur	253	Sangola	Shahajibapu Patil	SS	99,464	46.16	Aniket Deshmukh	PWPI	98,696	45.81	768	0.35
Solapur	254	Malshiras (SC)	Ram Satpute	BJP	1,03,507	48.09	Uttamrao Jankar	NCP	1,00,917	46.89	2,590	1.20
Satara	255	Phaltan (SC)	Dipak Pralhad Chavan	NCP	1,17,617	54.55	Agawane Digambar Rohidas	BJP	86,636	40.18	30,981	14.37
Satara	256	Wai	Makrand Jadhav	NCP	1,30,486	57.26	Madan Prataprao Bhosale	BJP	86,839	38.11	43,647	19.15
Satara	257	Koregaon	Mahesh Shinde	SS	1,01,487	49.58	Shashikant Shinde	NCP	95,255	46.54	6,232	3.04
Satara	258	Man	Jaykumar Gore	BJP	91,469	40.16	Prabhakar Krushnaji Deshmukh	IND	88,426	38.82	3,043	1.34
Satara	259	Karad North	Shamrao Pandurang Patil	NCP	1,00,509	50.39	Manoj Ghorpade	IND	51,294	25.72	49,215	24.67
Satara	260	Karad South	Prithviraj Chavan	INC	92,296	43.90	Atulbaba Suresh Bhosale	BJP	83,166	39.56	9,130	4.34
Satara	261	Patan	Shambhuraj Desai	SS	1,06,266	52.01	Vikramsinh Patankar	NCP	92,091	45.07	14,175	6.94
Satara	262	Satara	Shivendra Raje Bhosale	BJP	1,18,005	59.05	Deepak Sahebrao Pawar	NCP	74,581	37.32	43,424	21.73
Ratnagiri	263	Dapoli	Yogesh Kadam	SS	95,364	51.31	Kadam Sanjayrao Vasant	NCP	81,786	44.00	13,578	7.31
Ratnagiri	264	Guhagar	Bhaskar Jadhav	SS	78,748	55.18	Betkar Sahadev Devji	NCP	52,297	36.65	26,451	18.53
Ratnagiri	265	Chiplun	Shekhar Govindrao Nikam	NCP	1,01,578	57.09	Chavan Sadanand Narayan	SS	71,654	40.27	29,924	16.82
Ratnagiri	266	Ratnagiri	Uday Samant	SS	1,18,484	72.66	Sudesh Sadanand Mayekar	NCP	31,149	19.10	87,335	53.56
Ratnagiri	267	Rajapur	Rajan Salvi	SS	65,433	49.42	Avinash Shantaram Lad	INC	53,557	40.45	11,876	8.97
Sindhudurg	268	Kankavli	Nitesh Narayan Rane	BJP	84,504	56.16	Satish Jagannath Sawant	SS	56,388	37.48	28,116	18.68
Sindhudurg	269	Kudal	Vaibhav Naik	SS	69,168	50.90	Ranjit Dattatray Desai	IND	54,819	40.34	14,349	10.56
Sindhudurg	270	Sawantwadi	Deepak Vasant Kesarkar	SS	69,784	48.52	Rajan Krishna Teli	IND	56,556	39.32	13,228	9.20
Kolhapur	271	Chandgad	Rajesh Patil	NCP	55,558	25.19	Shivaji Patil	IND	51,173	23.20	4,385	1.99
Kolhapur	272	Radhanagari	Prakashrao Abitkar	SS	1,05,881	42.86	Krishnarao Patil	NCP	87,451	35.40	18,430	7.46
Kolhapur	273	Kagal	Hasan Mushrif	NCP	1,16,436	44.17	Ghatge Samarjeetsinh Vikramsinh	IND	88,303	33.49	28,133	10.68
Kolhapur	274	Kolhapur South	Ruturaj Patil	INC	1,40,103	57.50	Amal Mahadik	BJP	97,394	39.97	42,709	17.53
Kolhapur	275	Karvir	P. N. Patil	INC	1,35,675	52.91	Chandradip Narke	SS	1,13,014	44.07	22,661	8.84
Kolhapur	276	Kolhapur North	Chandrakant Jadhav	INC	91,053	51.97	Rajesh Vinayakrao Kshirsagar	SS	75,854	43.29	15,199	8.68
Kolhapur	277	Shahuwadi	Vinay Kore	JSS	1,24,868	53.94	Satyajeet Patil	SS	97,005	41.90	27,863	12.04
Kolhapur	278	Hatkanangle (SC)	Raju Awale	INC	73,720	31.57	Sujit Minchekar	SS	66,950	28.67	6,770	2.90
Kolhapur	279	Ichalkaranji	Prakashanna Awade	IND	1,16,886	58.07	Suresh Ganpati Halvankar	BJP	67,076	33.33	49,810	24.74
Kolhapur	280	Shirol	Rajendra Patil Yadravkar	IND	90,038	38.46	Ulhas Patil	SS	62,214	26.58	27,824	11.88
Sangli	281	Miraj (SC)	Suresh Khade	BJP	96,369	53.57	Balaso Dattatray Honmore	SWP	65,971	36.67	30,398	16.90
Sangli	282	Sangli	Sudhir Gadgil	BJP	93,636	49.63	Prithviraj Gulabrao Patil	INC	86,697	45.95	6,939	3.68
Sangli	283	Islampur	Jayant Patil	NCP	1,15,563	57.78	Nishikant Prakash Bhosale	IND	43,394	21.70	72,169	36.08
Sangli	284	Shirala	Mansing Fattesingrao Naik	NCP	1,01,933	44.46	Naik Shivajirao Yashwantrao	BJP	76,002	33.15	25,931	11.31
Sangli	285	Palus-Kadegaon	Vishwajeet Kadam	INC	1,71,497	83.04	Sanjay Ananda Vibhute	SS	8,976	4.35	1,62,521	78.69
Sangli	286	Khanapur	Anil Babar	SS	1,16,974	53.94	Sadashivrao Hanmantrao Patil	IND	90,683	41.81	26,291	12.13
Sangli	287	Tasgaon-Kavathe Mahankal	Suman Patil	NCP	1,28,371	63.78	Ajitrao Shankarrao Ghorpade	SS	65,839	32.71	62,532	31.07
Sangli	288	Jath	Vikramsinh Balasaheb Sawant	INC	87,184	49.70	Vilasrao Narayan Jagtap	BJP	52,510	29.93	34,674	19.77

== Seat Shifts & Retain ==
Party	Seats Retained	Seats Lost	Seats Gained	Final Count
Bharatiya Janata Party	82	▼40	▲23	105
Shiv Sena	36	▼27	▲20	56
Nationalist Congress Party	22	▼19	▲32	54
Indian National Congress	21	▼21	▲23	44
All India Majlis-e-Ittehadul Muslimeen	00	▼02	▲02	02

== Aftermath ==
After the declaration of election result on 24 October 2019, Shiv Sena declined to support BJP for the government formation demanding rotational Chief Ministers of both parties for 2.5 years each, which Shiv Sena claimed was promised by BJP during elections, and subsequently withdrew from Maha-Yuti Alliance. However, it was repeatedly clarified by Union Home Minister Amit Shah (then BJP National President) that no such promise was made and the campaign was to make Devendra Fadnavis the Chief Minister for another full term. As no political party was able to prove the majority in the assembly, the President's rule was imposed in the state following recommendation by the Governor on 12 November 2019.

Ultimately, the combination of largest legislative party BJP and a faction of the NCP agreed to form a grand coalition with Devendra Fadnavis returning as Chief Minister. Ajit Pawar of NCP was sworn in as Deputy Chief Minister. But the NCP national leadership had rebuffed this move and announced that it will not support BJP. On Tue, 26 Nov, Devendra Fadnavis resigned at a press conference in Mumbai.

A grand alliance named Maha Vikas Aghadi was formed following this and Uddhav Thackeray sworn in as chief minister on 28 November 2019.

The grand alliance consisted of Nationalist Congress Party, Shiv Sena and Indian National Congress. However in June 2022, a political crisis erupted in the coalition and a majority of Shiv Sena under the leadership of Eknath Shinde quit the coalition and formed part of National Democratic Alliance led by Bharatiya Janata Party. Uddhav Thackeray resigned on 29 June 2022 ahead of floor test. On the subsequent day, Eknath Shinde ministry came into power.

== Bypolls (2019-2024) ==
S.No	Date	Constituency	MLA before election	Party before election	Elected MLA	Party after election
252	17 April 2021	Pandharpur	Bharat Bhalke	Nationalist Congress Party	Samadhan Autade	Bharatiya Janata Party
90	30 October 2021	Deglur	Raosaheb Antapurkar	Indian National Congress	Jitesh Antapurkar	Indian National Congress
82	12 April 2022	Kolhapur North	Chandrakant Jadhav	Indian National Congress	Jayshri Jadhav	Indian National Congress
26	3 November 2022	Andheri East	Ramesh Latke	Shiv Sena	Rutuja Latke	Shiv Sena (Uddhav Balasaheb Thackeray)
205	26 February 2023	Chinchwad	Laxman Jagtap	Bharatiya Janata Party	Ashwini Jagtap	Bharatiya Janata Party
215	26 February 2023	Kasba Peth	Mukta Tilak	Bharatiya Janata Party	Ravindra Dhangekar	Indian National Congress

== Bibliography ==
- Suryawanshi, Sudhir (17 May 2020). Checkmate : how the BJP won and lost Maharashtra. Penguin Random House India Private Limited. ISBN 978-0-14-349768-4. OCLC 1159899265.

== See also ==
- 2019 elections in India
- 2019 Indian general election in Maharashtra
- 2019 Haryana Legislative Assembly election
- Uddhav Thackeray ministry
- 2022 Maharashtra political crisis
- Maha Vikas Aghadi
