= Antapurkar =

Antapurkar is a surname. Notable people with the surname include:

- Jitesh Antapurkar (born 1989), Indian politician
- Raosaheb Antapurkar (1958–2021), Indian politician
