= Malojiraje Shahu =

Indian politician

Member of Maharashtra Legislative Assembly
- In office 2004–2009
- Succeeded by: Rajesh Vinayakrao Kshirsagar
- Constituency: Kolhapur North

Personal details
- Party: Indian National Congress

Malojiraje Shahu (also known as Chhatrapati Malojiraje Shahu) is an Indian politician and a former member of the Maharashtra Legislative Assembly. He is the secretary of All India Shri Shivaji Memorial Society.

== Biography ==
Malojiraje Shahu belongs to the Kolhapur royal family, and is a descendant of the Shahu of Kolhapur. In 2004, he entered the Maharashtra Legislative Assembly with a ticket from Indian National Congress, defeating the Shiv Sena. He participated in the 2009 elections and lost to Rajesh Vinayakrao Kshirsagar which made him to ignore politics. The Congress offered him ticket to contest the Maharashtra assembly elections again in 2014, however, he was seen writing a letter to Manikrao Thakre, the president of the Maharashtra Pradesh Congress Committee stating that he has been very less active in politics. Earlier, he had led the party at a municipal corporation level.

In January 2021, Shahu re-entered the politics again and participated in the Kolhapur Municipal Corporation elections. He is the secretary of Pune-based All India Chhatrapati Shivaji Memorial Society.

On 2 September 2022, Shahu was elected as a member of the executive committee of the All India Football Federation.
