= Subhash Piraji Sabne =

Indian politician

Subhash Sabne

Member of Maharashtra Legislative Assembly
- In office (2014–2019)
- Preceded by: Raosaheb Antapurkar
- Succeeded by: Raosaheb Antapurkar
- Constituency: Deglur (Vidhan Sabha constituency)
- In office (1999-2004), (2004 – 2009)
- Preceded by: Avinash Ghate
- Succeeded by: Hanmant Venkatrao Patil
- Constituency: Mukhed Assembly constituency

Personal details
- Party: Prahar Janshakti Party (2024–Present)
- Other political affiliations: Bharatiya Janata Party (2021-2024); Shiv Sena (1999-2024)
- Occupation: Politician

Subhash Piraji Sabne is a Prahar Janshakti Party politician from Nanded district, Marathwada. He joined Prahar Janshakti Party in 2024. He was a member of the 13th Maharashtra Legislative Assembly. He represented the Deglur Assembly Constituency as a member of Shiv Sena. He had formerly represented the Mukhed constituency as a Shiv Sena member during the period 1999–2009. In July, 2015, he was a member of the Maharashtra State Legislature Scheduled Caste Welfare Committee.

== Controversy ==
Sabne was reported to have been involved in holding up a train at Hazur Sahib Nanded railway station because his reservation wasn't confirmed.

== Positions held ==
- 1999: Elected to Maharashtra Legislative Assembly
- 2004: Re-elected to Maharashtra Legislative Assembly
- 2014: Re-elected to Maharashtra Legislative Assembly
