= Hingoli Assembly constituency =

Constituency of the Maharashtra legislative assembly in India

Coordinates: 19.72°N 77.15°E

Hingoli
- Constituency No. 94 for the Maharashtra Legislative Assembly

Constituency details
- Country: India
- Region: Western India
- State: Maharashtra
- District: Hingoli
- Lok Sabha constituency: Hingoli
- Established: 1952
- Total electors: 333,588
- Reservation: None

Member of Legislative Assembly
- 15th Maharashtra Legislative Assembly
- Incumbent Tanaji Sakharamji Mutkule
- Party: Bharatiya Janata Party
- Elected year: 2024

Hingoli Assembly constituency is one of the 288 Vidhan Sabha (legislative assembly) constituencies of Maharashtra state, western India. This constituency is located in Hingoli district. The delimitation of the constituency happened in 2008.

== Geographical scope ==
The constituency comprises Sengaon Taluka, parts of Hingoli Taluka, revenue circles of Malhiwara, Narsi, Hingoli and Hingoli municipal council.

== Members of the Legislative Assembly ==
Election	Member	Party
1952	Sham Rao	Peasants and Workers Party of India
1952	Madhaorao	Scheduled Castes Federation
1957	Baburao S/o Kondji Patil Goregaonkar	Indian National Congress
1957	Surajmal S/o Narayan	Indian National Congress
1962	Narayan Rao Limbaji Rao	Indian National Congress
1967	Chandrakant Ramkrishna Patil	Sanghata Socialist Party
1972	Ashatai Marotiappa Tale	Indian National Congress
1978	Dagduji Yeshwantrao Galande	Janata Party
1980	Sahebrao Shankarrao Deshmukh	Indian National Congress
1985	Sahebrao Narayanrao Patil Goregaonkar	Indian National Congress
1990	Baliram (Bapu) Kotkar Patil	Bharatiya Janata Party
1995	Baliram (Bapu) Kotkar Patil	Bharatiya Janata Party
1999	Bhaurao Baburao Patil Goregaonkar	Indian National Congress
2004	Bhaurao Baburao Patil Goregaonkar	Indian National Congress
2009	Bhaurao Baburao Patil Goregaonkar	Indian National Congress
2014	Tanaji Sakharamji Mutkule	Bharatiya Janata Party
2019	Tanaji Sakharamji Mutkule	Bharatiya Janata Party
2024	Tanaji Sakharamji Mutkule	Bharatiya Janata Party

== Election results ==
=== Assembly Election 2024 ===
2024 Maharashtra Legislative Assembly election : Hingoli
Party	Candidate	Votes	%	±%
BJP	Tanaji Sakharamji Mutkule	74,584	32.55%	▼15.36
SS(UBT)	Rupalitai Rajesh Patil	63,658	27.78%	New
VBA	Prakash Dattrao Thorat	23,944	10.45%	▲0.47
Independent	Bhaurao Baburao Patil Goregaonkar	22,267	9.72%	New
Independent	Ramesh Vitthalrao Shinde	19,336	8.44%	New
Independent	Ramdas Patil Sumthankar	10,918	4.76%	New
MNS	Pramod Alias Bandu Kute	2,287	1.00%	New
Independent	Adv. Abhijeet Dilip Khandare	2,124	0.93%	New
Independent	Govindrao Namdev Gutthe	1,551	0.68%	New
NOTA	None of the above	665	0.29%	▼0.40
Margin of victory		10,926	4.77%	▼7.33
Turnout		229,820	68.89%	▲4.73
Total valid votes		229,155		
Registered electors		333,588		▲6.77
BJP hold		Swing	▼15.36	

=== Assembly Election 2019 ===
2019 Maharashtra Legislative Assembly election : Hingoli
Party	Candidate	Votes	%	±%
BJP	Tanaji Sakharamji Mutkule	95,318	47.91%	▼3.28
INC	Bhaurao Baburao Patil Goregaonkar	71,253	35.81%	▲14.40
VBA	Vasim Deshmukh	19,856	9.98%	New
PHJSP	Adv. Vijay Dnyanba Raut	4,646	2.34%	New
Independent	Asaraji (Pappu) Suresh Chavan	1,733	0.87%	New
BSP	Suresh Mohan Gaikwad	1,567	0.79%	▼4.34
NOTA	None of the above	1,369	0.69%	▲0.20
Margin of victory		24,065	12.10%	▼17.67
Turnout		200,468	64.16%	▼2.30
Total valid votes		198,950		
Registered electors		312,431		▲8.99
BJP hold		Swing	▼3.28	

=== Assembly Election 2014 ===
2014 Maharashtra Legislative Assembly election : Hingoli
Party	Candidate	Votes	%	±%
BJP	Tanaji Sakharamji Mutkule	97,045	51.19%	▲17.07
INC	Bhaurao Baburao Patil Goregaonkar	40,599	21.41%	▼15.16
NCP	Dilip Baburao Chavan	21,897	11.55%	New
BSP	Adv. Sahebrao Kishan Sirsat	9,731	5.13%	▲3.07
SS	Deshmukh Dinkar Pralhadrao	6,397	3.37%	New
MNS	Omprakash Govindrao Kotkar	3,616	1.91%	▼1.59
CPI	Tapare Tukaram Kisanrao	3,028	1.60%	New
BBM	Adv. Khandare Dhammdipak Baliram	2,066	1.09%	▼0.91
NOTA	None of the above	928	0.49%	New
Margin of victory		56,446	29.77%	▲27.31
Turnout		190,528	66.46%	▲3.08
Total valid votes		189,591		
Registered electors		286,671		▲13.08
BJP gain from INC		Swing	▲14.62	

=== Assembly Election 2009 ===
2009 Maharashtra Legislative Assembly election : Hingoli
Party	Candidate	Votes	%	±%
INC	Bhaurao Baburao Patil Goregaonkar	58,755	36.57%	▲4.71
BJP	Tanaji Sakharamji Mutkule	54,810	34.12%	New
SP	Shebrao Narayanrao Patil Goregaonkar	32,400	20.17%	▲18.79
MNS	Sandesh Balasaheb Deshmukh	5,619	3.50%	New
BSP	Adhe Bhagwat Raoji	3,307	2.06%	▼19.32
BBM	Khandare Vishnu Narayan	3,221	2.00%	New
Independent	Pathan Sattar Khan Saleem Khan	1,783	1.11%	New
Margin of victory		3,945	2.46%	▼8.02
Turnout		160,683	63.38%	▼5.69
Total valid votes		160,654		
Registered electors		253,516		▲14.63
INC hold		Swing	▲4.71	

=== Assembly Election 2004 ===
2004 Maharashtra Legislative Assembly election : Hingoli
Party	Candidate	Votes	%	±%
INC	Bhaurao Baburao Patil Goregaonkar	48,646	31.86%	▼9.60
BSP	Sahebrao Narayanrao Patil Goregaonkar	32,649	21.38%	New
SS	Shivaji Gyanbarao Mane	31,900	20.89%	New
Independent	Baliram (Bapu) Kotkar Patil	29,094	19.05%	New
Independent	Shinde Bheemrao Lakshman	3,288	2.15%	New
Independent	Bhise Gautam Dhonduji	3,150	2.06%	New
SP	Shaikh Naim Shaikh Lal	2,102	1.38%	New
Shivrajya Party	Deshmukh Jagdish Balasaheb	1,860	1.22%	New
Margin of victory		15,997	10.48%	▲5.25
Turnout		152,754	69.07%	▼0.41
Total valid votes		152,689		
Registered electors		221,155		▲20.45
INC hold		Swing	▼9.60	

=== Assembly Election 1999 ===
1999 Maharashtra Legislative Assembly election : Hingoli
Party	Candidate	Votes	%	±%
INC	Bhaurao Baburao Patil Goregaonkar	47,025	41.46%	▲16.61
BJP	Baliram (Bapu) Kotkar Patil	41,097	36.23%	▲9.10
NCP	Rajesh Sahebrao Patil Goregaonkar (Bhaiya Patil)	24,500	21.60%	New
Margin of victory		5,928	5.23%	▲2.95
Turnout		127,563	69.48%	▼5.99
Total valid votes		113,434		
Registered electors		183,602		▲0.51
INC gain from BJP		Swing	▲14.33	

=== Assembly Election 1995 ===
1995 Maharashtra Legislative Assembly election : Hingoli
Party	Candidate	Votes	%	±%
BJP	Baliram (Bapu) Kotkar Patil	36,257	27.13%	▼14.32
INC	Sahebrao Narayanrao Patil Goregaonkar	33,207	24.85%	▼5.57
BBM	Madhavrao Bahenarao Pole (Naik)	25,251	18.90%	New
Independent	Bhaurao Baburao Patil Goregaonkar	18,458	13.81%	New
Independent	Wable Uttamrao Rambhaji	5,275	3.95%	New
JD	Keshav Dhansing Rathod	4,955	3.71%	▼2.06
Independent	Dube Rajendrakumar Krushnakumar	3,423	2.56%	New
Independent	Khillare Chagan Chokhaji	1,759	1.32%	New
Margin of victory		3,050	2.28%	▼8.75
Turnout		137,863	75.47%	▲10.97
Total valid votes		133,638		
Registered electors		182,673		▲8.42
BJP hold		Swing	▼14.32	

=== Assembly Election 1990 ===
1990 Maharashtra Legislative Assembly election : Hingoli
Party	Candidate	Votes	%	±%
BJP	Baliram (Bapu) Kotkar Patil	43,966	41.45%	New
INC	Sahebrao Narayanrao Patil Goregaonkar	32,269	30.42%	▼21.12
RPI	Keshav Dhansing Rathod	18,976	17.89%	▲16.33
JD	Ashok Narayan Paturkar	6,115	5.77%	New
Doordarshi Party	Chaudhari Lotu Pundlik	1,793	1.69%	New
Independent	Sk. Aref Sk. Anwar	998	0.94%	New
Margin of victory		11,697	11.03%	▼13.58
Turnout		108,674	64.50%	▲7.64
Total valid votes		106,063		
Registered electors		168,479		▲24.83
BJP gain from INC		Swing	▼10.09	

=== Assembly Election 1985 ===
1985 Maharashtra Legislative Assembly election : Hingoli
Party	Candidate	Votes	%	±%
INC	Shebrao Narayanrao Patil Goregaonkar	38,442	51.54%	New
Independent	Dattrao Haibatrao Thorat	20,085	26.93%	New
JP	Dagduji Yeshwantrao Galande	6,067	8.13%	New
Independent	Ingole Suryakant Dnynoba	6,044	8.10%	New
Independent	Sutar Balwantrao Sitaram	1,208	1.62%	New
RPI	D. N. More	1,165	1.56%	New
Independent	Bhos Kishanrao Raghoji	786	1.05%	New
Independent	Pole Punjabrao Sitaram Naik	513	0.69%	New
Margin of victory		18,357	24.61%	▼11.41
Turnout		76,738	56.86%	▲0.44
Total valid votes		74,593		
Registered electors		134,968		▲14.19
INC gain from INC(I)		Swing	▼4.99	

=== Assembly Election 1980 ===
1980 Maharashtra Legislative Assembly election : Hingoli
Party	Candidate	Votes	%	±%
INC(I)	Sahebrao Shankarrao Deshmukh	36,652	56.53%	▲16.16
INC(U)	Sampatrao Gyanbarao Bangar	13,300	20.51%	New
RPI(K)	Madhukar Dashrathrao Manjramkar	8,181	12.62%	New
JP	Chandrakant Ramkrishna Patil	6,529	10.07%	New
Margin of victory		23,352	36.02%	▲35.84
Turnout		66,681	56.42%	▼8.15
Total valid votes		64,832		
Registered electors		118,195		▲7.47
INC(I) gain from JP		Swing	▲15.98	

=== Assembly Election 1978 ===
1978 Maharashtra Legislative Assembly election : Hingoli
Party	Candidate	Votes	%	±%
JP	Dagduji Yeshwantrao Galande	27,723	40.55%	New
INC(I)	Sahebrao Shankarrao Deshmukh	27,602	40.37%	New
INC	Ashtai Moratippa Tale	8,799	12.87%	▼32.42
Independent	Deshmukh Dattarao Balajirao	4,249	6.21%	New
Margin of victory		121	0.18%	▼8.40
Turnout		71,014	64.57%	▲21.59
Total valid votes		68,373		
Registered electors		109,984		▲3.99
JP gain from INC		Swing	▼4.74	

=== Assembly Election 1972 ===
1972 Maharashtra Legislative Assembly election : Hingoli
Party	Candidate	Votes	%	±%
INC	Ashatai Marotiappa Tale	19,706	45.29%	▲7.22
SSP	Ramkrishna Patil	15,975	36.72%	New
ABJS	Dr.Karmalkar I. Shantaram	2,911	6.69%	▼2.08
RPI	Digamber Rao Gyanuji Wadhe	2,640	6.07%	New
INC(O)	Chandrakant E. Waghmare	989	2.27%	New
Margin of victory		3,731	8.58%	▼2.92
Turnout		45,463	42.98%	▼12.50
Total valid votes		43,506		
Registered electors		105,766		▲11.77
INC gain from SSP		Swing	▼4.28	

=== Assembly Election 1967 ===
1967 Maharashtra Legislative Assembly election : Hingoli
Party	Candidate	Votes	%	±%
SSP	Chandrakant Ramkrishna Patil	22,520	49.57%	New
INC	N. Lokavarkhe	17,295	38.07%	▼14.34
ABJS	Dr.Karmalkar I. Shantaram	3,984	8.77%	New
Independent	S. S. Kamble	1,634	3.60%	New
Margin of victory		5,225	11.50%	▼17.17
Turnout		52,499	55.48%	▲4.78
Total valid votes		45,433		
Registered electors		94,625		▲17.00
SSP gain from INC		Swing	▼2.84	

=== Assembly Election 1962 ===
1962 Maharashtra Legislative Assembly election : Hingoli
Party	Candidate	Votes	%	±%
INC	Narayan Rao Limbaji Rao	19,892	52.41%	▼3.33
PSP	Chandrakant Ramkrishna Patil	9,012	23.74%	New
PWPI	Shamrao Madhaorao	7,921	20.87%	▼1.62
Independent	Shankar Jiwanaji	1,130	2.98%	New
Margin of victory		10,880	28.67%	▲23.03
Turnout		41,000	50.70%	▼27.87
Total valid votes		37,955		
Registered electors		80,875		▼35.46
INC hold		Swing	▲24.28	

=== Assembly Election 1957 ===
1957 Bombay State Legislative Assembly election : Hingoli
Party	Candidate	Votes	%	±%
INC	Baburao S/o Kondji Patil Goregaonkar	27,695	28.13%	▲0.74
INC	Surajmal S/o Narayan	27,181	27.61%	▲0.22
PWPI	Vithalrao S/o Raghavji	22,140	22.49%	▼1.16
SCF	Balkrishna Shivram	21,433	21.77%	▲4.38
Margin of victory		5,555	5.64%	▼2.45
Turnout		98,449	78.57%	▲3.71
Total valid votes		98,449		
Registered electors		125,306		▲7.65
INC gain from PWPI		Swing	▲4.48	

=== Assembly Election 1952 ===
1952 Hyderabad State Legislative Assembly election : Hingoli
Party	Candidate	Votes	%	±%
PWPI	Sham Rao	20,607	23.65%	New
SCF	Madhaorao	15,149	17.39%	New
INC	Bhim Rao	13,560	15.56%	New
Independent	Madhvrao	11,884	13.64%	New
INC	Suraj Mal	10,303	11.82%	New
Independent	Bansilal	5,252	6.03%	New
PDF	Dipaji	3,691	4.24%	New
Socialist	Chandrakant Ramkrishna Patil	3,547	4.07%	New
Socialist	Dynoba Amruta	3,137	3.60%	New
Margin of victory		7,047	8.09%	
Turnout		87,130	37.43%	
Total valid votes		87,130		
Registered electors		116,397		
PWPI win (new seat)				
