= Sharad Sonavane =

Indian politician

Member of the Maharashtra Legislative Assembly
- Incumbent
- Assumed office 2024-Present
- Preceded by: Atul Vallabh Benke
- Constituency: Junnar Assembly constituency
- In office 2014–2019
- Preceded by: Vallabh Benke
- Succeeded by: Atul Vallabh Benke
- Constituency: Junnar Assembly constituency

Personal details
- Party: Independent
- Other political affiliations: Balasahebanchi Shiv Sena (2022-2023)
- Occupation: Politician

Sharad Bhimaji Sonawane is an Indian politician from Maharashtra. He is a first term Member of the Maharashtra Legislative Assembly from the Junnar Assembly Constituency.

== Maharashtra Legislative Assembly elections 2014 And 2024. ==
Sharaddada Bhimaji Sonavane won the Maharashtra Legislative Assembly elections 2014 And 2024.

== Political life ==
Sharad Bhimaji Sonavane was the member of the Maharashtra Legislative Assembly from Maharashtra Navanirman Sena. He was the only MLA of MNS who was elected in 2014 legislative assembly elections. He changed his party to shiv sena before the 2019 legislative assembly elections. He lost the election.

== Positions held ==
- Maharashtra Legislative Assembly MLA
- Terms in office:2014–2019.
- Maharashtra Legislative Assembly MLA - 2024
