= Atul Vallabh Benke =

Indian politician

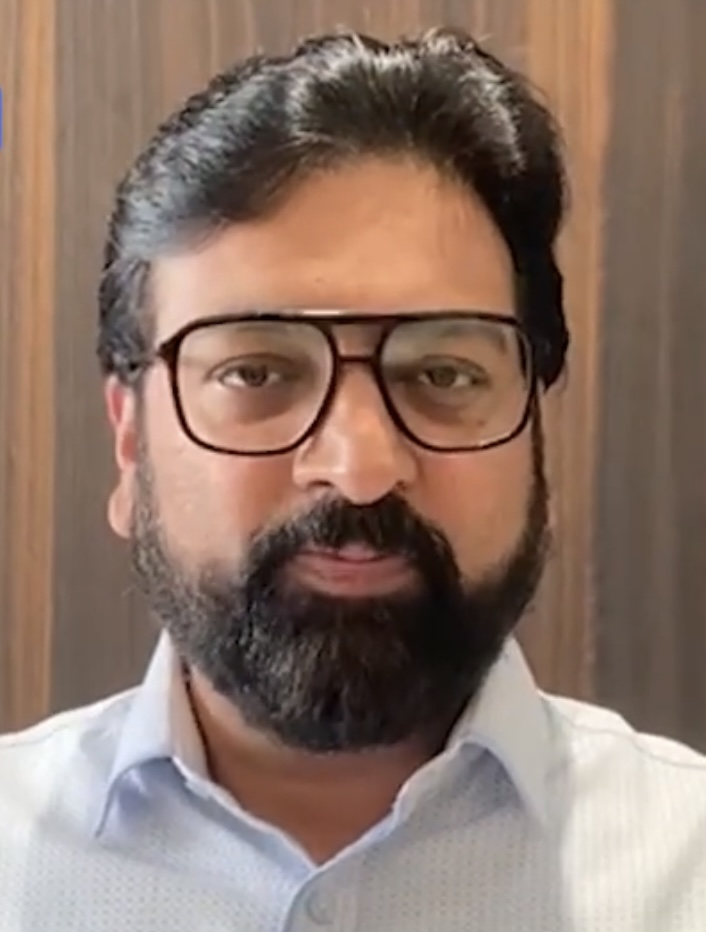

Member of Maharashtra Legislative Assembly
- In office 2019–2024
- Preceded by: Sharad Sonavane
- Succeeded by: Sharad Sonavane
- Constituency: Junnar Assembly constituency

Personal details
- Party: Nationalist Congress Party
- Parent: Vallabh Benke
- Profession: Politician

Atul Vallabh Benke (born 23 July 1980) is an Indian politician from Maharashtra. He is a member of the Maharashtra Legislative Assembly from Junnar Assembly constituency in Pune district. He won the 2019 Maharashtra Legislative Assembly election representing the Nationalist Congress Party.

== Early life and education ==
Benke is from Junnar, Pune district, Maharashtra. He is the son of former MLA Vallabh Dattatray Benake. He completed his B.E. in Civil in 2005 at Pune University.

== Career ==
Benke won from Junnar Assembly constituency representing Nationalist Congress Party in the 2019 Maharashtra Legislative Assembly election. He polled 74,958 votes and defeated his nearest rival, Sharaddada Bhimaji Sonavane of Shiv Sena, by a margin of 9,068 votes. Earlier in 2014, he lost the seat finishing third behind winner Sharad Sonavane and Asha Buchke, who came second in the 2014 Maharashtra Legislative Assembly election. He first became an MLA winning the 2009 Maharashtra Legislative Assembly election taking over from his father, Benke Vallabh Dattatraya, who won for the third time in 2004. In 2009, he polled 79,360 votes and defeated his nearest rival, Asha Buchake of Shiva Sena, by a margin of 6,458 votes.
