= Junnar Assembly constituency =

Constituency of the Maharashtra legislative assembly in India

Coordinates: 19.21°N 73.87°E

Junnar
- Constituency No. 195 for the Maharashtra Legislative Assembly

Constituency details
- Country: India
- Region: Western India
- State: Maharashtra
- District: Pune
- Lok Sabha constituency: Shirur
- Established: 1952
- Total electors: 326,041
- Reservation: None

Member of Legislative Assembly
- 15th Maharashtra Legislative Assembly
- Incumbent Sharad Sonavane
- Party: IND
- Alliance: NDA
- Elected year: 2024

Junnar Assembly constituency is one of the 288 Vidhan Sabha (legislative assembly) constituencies of Maharashtra state, western India. This constituency is located in Pune district.

== Geographical scope ==
The constituency consists of Junnar taluka.

== Members of the Legislative Assembly ==
Election	Member	Party
1952	Dhobale Dattatraya Amrutrao	Indian National Congress
1957	Kale Shivaji Mahadu	Praja Socialist Party
1962	Vithalrao Narayanrao Awate	Praja Socialist Party
1967	D. R. Kakade	Indian National Congress
1972	Shrikishna Ramji Tambe	Indian National Congress
1978	Krishnarao Ramji Mundhe	Indian National Congress
1980	Dilip Dhamdhere	Indian National Congress (U)
1985	Vallabh Benke	Indian Congress (Socialist)
1990	Vallabh Benke	Indian National Congress
1995	Balasaheb Dangat	Shiv Sena
1999	Balasaheb Dangat	Shiv Sena
2004	Vallabh Benke	Nationalist Congress Party
2009	Vallabh Benke	Nationalist Congress Party
2014	Sharad Sonavane	Maharashtra Navnirman Sena
2019	Atul Vallabh Benke	Nationalist Congress Party
2024	Sharad Sonavane	Independent politician

== Election results ==
=== Assembly Election 2024 ===
2024 Maharashtra Legislative Assembly election : Junnar
Party	Candidate	Votes	%	±%
Independent	Sharad Sonavane	73,355	32.63%	New
NCP-SP	Satyashil Sopansheth Sherkar	66,691	29.66%	New
NCP	Atul Vallabh Benke	48,100	21.39%	New
VBA	Devram Sakharam Lande	22,401	9.96%	▲9.53
Independent	Ashatai Dattatray Buchake	9,435	4.20%	New
Independent	Akash Rajendra Adhav	1,867	0.83%	New
NOTA	None of the above	1,376	0.61%	▼0.13
Margin of victory		6,664	2.96%	▼1.55
Turnout		226,201	69.38%	▲1.80
Total valid votes		224,825		
Registered electors		326,041		▲8.70
Independent gain from NCP		Swing	▼4.66	

=== Assembly Election 2019 ===
2019 Maharashtra Legislative Assembly election : Junnar
Party	Candidate	Votes	%	±%
NCP	Atul Vallabh Benke	74,958	37.29%	▲16.51
SS	Sharad Sonavane	65,890	32.78%	▲10.56
Independent	Ashatai Dattatray Buchake	50,041	24.89%	New
Independent	Dr. Kedari Vinod Tanhaji	6,719	3.34%	New
NOTA	None of the above	1,492	0.74%	▼0.16
Margin of victory		9,068	4.51%	▼4.16
Turnout		202,688	67.58%	▼3.83
Total valid votes		201,037		
Registered electors		299,932		▲8.70
NCP gain from MNS		Swing	▲6.40	

=== Assembly Election 2014 ===
2014 Maharashtra Legislative Assembly election : Junnar
Party	Candidate	Votes	%	±%
MNS	Sharad Sonavane	60,305	30.89%	▲27.99
SS	Ashatai Dattatray Buchake	43,382	22.22%	▼22.36
NCP	Atul Vallabh Benke	40,570	20.78%	▼27.75
BJP	Netajidada Suresh Doke	22,455	11.50%	New
Independent	Maruti Dubaji Wayal	12,218	6.26%	New
BSP	Adv. Gaffoor Ahamadkhan Pathan	8,603	4.41%	▲3.67
INC	Ganpat Rakhmaji Phulawade	4,664	2.39%	New
NOTA	None of the above	1,756	0.90%	New
Margin of victory		16,923	8.67%	▲4.72
Turnout		197,023	71.41%	▲8.04
Total valid votes		195,252		
Registered electors		275,914		▲6.91
MNS gain from NCP		Swing	▼17.64	

=== Assembly Election 2009 ===
2009 Maharashtra Legislative Assembly election : Junnar
Party	Candidate	Votes	%	±%
NCP	Vallabh Benke	79,360	48.53%	▼1.47
SS	Asha Dattatray Buchake	72,902	44.58%	▲4.15
MNS	Adv. Krishna Dashrath Lande	4,741	2.90%	New
Independent	Shinde Shankar Tukaram	2,088	1.28%	New
RPI(A)	Rakshe Popat Sakharam	1,413	0.86%	New
Independent	Chilap Vasant Sawaleram	1,324	0.81%	New
BSP	Bhosale Sunil Rangnath	1,214	0.74%	▼0.75
Margin of victory		6,458	3.95%	▼5.62
Turnout		163,552	63.37%	▼7.90
Total valid votes		163,536		
Registered electors		258,092		▲24.48
NCP hold		Swing	▼1.47	

=== Assembly Election 2004 ===
2004 Maharashtra Legislative Assembly election : Junnar
Party	Candidate	Votes	%	±%
NCP	Vallabh Benke	73,855	50.00%	▲15.83
SS	Janardan Alias Balasaheb Sawlerambuwa Dangat	59,724	40.43%	▼4.39
Independent	Phulawade Ganpatrao Rakhmaji	6,751	4.57%	New
Independent	Sukhdev Ganpat Kharat	2,514	1.70%	New
BSP	Dongre Manohar Chimaji	2,205	1.49%	New
Peoples Republican Party	Ashok Gangadhar Ratnaparkhi	1,401	0.95%	New
Margin of victory		14,131	9.57%	▼1.08
Turnout		147,772	71.27%	▲0.32
Total valid votes		147,706		
Registered electors		207,329		▲20.13
NCP gain from SS		Swing	▲5.18	

=== Assembly Election 1999 ===
1999 Maharashtra Legislative Assembly election : Junnar
Party	Candidate	Votes	%	±%
SS	Balasaheb Savalerambuva Dangat	52,284	44.82%	▲1.64
NCP	Vallabh Benke	39,865	34.17%	New
INC	Sopansheth Namedo Sherkar	18,009	15.44%	▼15.41
CPI(M)	Kalu Krishna Shelkande	4,979	4.27%	New
ABS	Kamble Sandip Sadashiv	962	0.82%	New
Margin of victory		12,419	10.65%	▼1.68
Turnout		122,454	70.95%	▼13.33
Total valid votes		116,659		
Registered electors		172,593		▲2.88
SS hold		Swing	▲1.64	

=== Assembly Election 1995 ===
1995 Maharashtra Legislative Assembly election : Junnar
Party	Candidate	Votes	%	±%
SS	Balasaheb Savalerambuva Dangat	59,552	43.18%	▲21.36
INC	Vallabh Benke	42,545	30.85%	▼5.70
Independent	Fulawade Ganpat Rakhama	26,984	19.56%	New
BBM	Utale Raghunath Laxman	5,618	4.07%	New
Samajwadi Janata Party (Maharashtra)	Farida Rahimatalli Sayyad	1,050	0.76%	New
Margin of victory		17,007	12.33%	▲2.34
Turnout		141,389	84.28%	▲17.93
Total valid votes		137,930		
Registered electors		167,760		▲5.10
SS gain from INC		Swing	▲6.63	

=== Assembly Election 1990 ===
1990 Maharashtra Legislative Assembly election : Junnar
Party	Candidate	Votes	%	±%
INC	Vallabh Benke	37,953	36.55%	▼10.52
JP	Gunjal Mahadeo Rakhama Alias Tatyasaheb	27,577	26.56%	New
SS	Balasaheb Savalerambuva Dangat	22,653	21.82%	New
Independent	Utale Raghunath Laxman	13,833	13.32%	New
Bharatiya Krishi Udyog Sangh	Kankariya Subhash Alias Mamaji Ramchandra	831	0.80%	New
Margin of victory		10,376	9.99%	▲5.79
Turnout		105,905	66.35%	▼3.03
Total valid votes		103,832		
Registered electors		159,616		▲32.66
INC gain from IC(S)		Swing	▼14.72	

=== Assembly Election 1985 ===
1985 Maharashtra Legislative Assembly election : Junnar
Party	Candidate	Votes	%	±%
IC(S)	Vallabh Benke	41,840	51.27%	New
INC	Nivrittishet Namdeo Sherkar	38,412	47.07%	New
Independent	Baban Tukaram Meher	785	0.96%	New
Independent	Rambhau Vithal Lande	565	0.69%	New
Margin of victory		3,428	4.20%	▼21.86
Turnout		83,478	69.38%	▲27.63
Total valid votes		81,602		
Registered electors		120,323		▲7.54
IC(S) gain from INC(U)		Swing	▼11.14	

=== Assembly Election 1980 ===
1980 Maharashtra Legislative Assembly election : Junnar
Party	Candidate	Votes	%	±%
INC(U)	Dilip Dhamdhere	28,484	62.41%	New
INC(I)	Balasaheb Purvant	16,588	36.35%	New
Independent	Khandu Nawaji Gawade	568	1.24%	New
Margin of victory		11,896	26.06%	▲24.95
Turnout		46,716	41.75%	▼22.27
Total valid votes		45,640		
Registered electors		111,887		▲6.77
INC(U) gain from INC		Swing	▲17.69	

=== Assembly Election 1978 ===
1978 Maharashtra Legislative Assembly election : Junnar
Party	Candidate	Votes	%	±%
INC	Krishna Ramji Mundhe	29,017	44.72%	▼11.04
JP	Jagdish Phule	28,297	43.61%	New
Independent	Chaskar Shankar Dhondiba	7,578	11.68%	New
Margin of victory		720	1.11%	▼12.21
Turnout		67,093	64.02%	▲4.03
Total valid votes		64,892		
Registered electors		104,793		▲31.88
INC hold		Swing	▼11.04	

=== Assembly Election 1972 ===
1972 Maharashtra Legislative Assembly election : Junnar
Party	Candidate	Votes	%	±%
INC	Tambeshrikishna Ramji	25,542	55.76%	▲7.70
SSP	Phule Jagdish Sitaram	19,440	42.44%	New
Independent	Arvind Bhatwa Dekar	828	1.81%	New
Margin of victory		6,102	13.32%	▲9.67
Turnout		47,666	59.99%	▲4.78
Total valid votes		45,810		
Registered electors		79,463		▲8.20
INC hold		Swing	▲7.70	

=== Assembly Election 1967 ===
1967 Maharashtra Legislative Assembly election : Junnar
Party	Candidate	Votes	%	±%
INC	D. R. Kakade	18,486	48.06%	▲3.85
SSP	J. S. Phule	17,083	44.42%	New
PSP	D. S. Thorat	2,085	5.42%	▼39.11
ABJS	N. N. More	807	2.10%	New
Margin of victory		1,403	3.65%	▲3.33
Turnout		40,545	55.21%	▼4.74
Total valid votes		38,461		
Registered electors		73,444		▲4.97
INC gain from PSP		Swing	▲3.53	

=== Assembly Election 1962 ===
1962 Maharashtra Legislative Assembly election : Junnar
Party	Candidate	Votes	%	±%
PSP	Vithalrao Narayanrao Awate	17,826	44.53%	▼21.28
INC	Shivaji Mahadeo Kale	17,699	44.21%	▲26.05
PWPI	Krishna Ramji Mundhe	4,510	11.27%	New
Margin of victory		127	0.32%	▼47.34
Turnout		41,946	59.95%	▲13.36
Total valid votes		40,035		
Registered electors		69,964		▲18.30
PSP hold		Swing	▼21.28	

=== Assembly Election 1957 ===
1957 Bombay State Legislative Assembly election : Junnar
Party	Candidate	Votes	%	±%
PSP	Kale Shivaji Mahadu	18,135	65.81%	New
INC	Vahval Sonu Bhiku	5,003	18.16%	▼19.90
Independent	Rongate Bhau Paru	4,417	16.03%	New
Margin of victory		13,132	47.66%	▲37.60
Turnout		27,555	46.59%	▼0.69
Total valid votes		27,555		
Registered electors		59,140		▲6.36
PSP gain from INC		Swing	▲27.75	

=== Assembly Election 1952 ===
1952 Bombay State Legislative Assembly election : Junnar
Party	Candidate	Votes	%	±%
INC	Dhobale Dattatraya Amrutrao	10,007	38.06%	New
Socialist	Kale Shivaji Amrutrao	7,363	28.01%	New
Independent	Khadkar Keshav Pandurang	3,463	13.17%	New
Independent	Vipradas Dattatraya Keshav	2,890	10.99%	New
PWPI	Wabale Vishwanath Jayaram	1,873	7.12%	New
Independent	Hande Nanasaheb Govindrao	694	2.64%	New
Margin of victory		2,644	10.06%	
Turnout		26,290	47.28%	
Total valid votes		26,290		
Registered electors		55,606		
INC win (new seat)				
