= Deglur Assembly constituency =

Constituency of the Maharashtra legislative assembly in India

Coordinates: 18.55°N 77.58°E

Deglur
- Constituency No. 90 for the Maharashtra Legislative Assembly

Constituency details
- Country: India
- Region: Western India
- State: Maharashtra
- District: Nanded
- Lok Sabha constituency: Nanded
- Established: 1952
- Total electors: 312,425
- Reservation: SC

Member of Legislative Assembly
- 15th Maharashtra Legislative Assembly
- Incumbent Jitesh Antapurkar
- Party: Bharatiya Janata Party
- Elected year: 2024

Deglur Assembly constituency is one of the 288 Vidhan Sabha (legislative assembly) constituencies of Maharashtra state, western India. This constituency is located in Nanded district. The delimitation of the constituency happened in 2008. It is reserved for Scheduled Castes.

== Geographical scope ==
The constituency comprises Deglur taluka and Biloli taluka.

== Members of the Legislative Assembly ==
Election	Member	Party
1952	Jaywant Rao	Indian National Congress
1952	Ganpath Rao Manikrao	Indian National Congress
1967	Madhukarrao Rangojirao Ghate	Indian National Congress
1972	Piraji Satwaji Sabne	Indian National Congress
2009	Raosaheb Antapurkar	Indian National Congress
2014	Subhash Piraji Sabne	Shiv Sena
2019	Raosaheb Antapurkar	Indian National Congress
2021 By-election	Jitesh Antapurkar	Indian National Congress
2024	Jitesh Antapurkar	Bharatiya Janata Party

== Election results ==
=== Assembly Election 2024 ===
2024 Maharashtra Legislative Assembly election : Deglur
Party	Candidate	Votes	%	±%
BJP	Jitesh Antapurkar	107,841	54.09%	▲18.83
INC	Nivrutti Kondiba Kamble Sangvikar	64,842	32.52%	▼24.84
PHJSP	Subhash Piraji Sabne	15,919	7.98%	New
VBA	Sushilkumar Vitthalrao Degloorkar	5,403	2.71%	▼3.27
Independent	Madhu Girgaonkar (Sagrolikar)	1,527	0.77%	New
Maharashtra Vikas Aghadi	Anuradha Shankar Gandhare (Dachawar)	1,299	0.65%	New
NOTA	None of the above	939	0.47%	▼0.11
Margin of victory		42,999	21.57%	▼0.53
Turnout		200,330	64.12%	▲0.22
Total valid votes		199,391		
Registered electors		312,425		▲4.65
BJP gain from INC		Swing	▼3.27	

=== Assembly By-election 2021 ===
2021 Maharashtra Legislative Assembly by-election : Deglur
Party	Candidate	Votes	%	±%
INC	Jitesh Antapurkar	108,840	57.36%	▲6.69
BJP	Subhash Piraji Sabne	66,907	35.26%	New
VBA	Uttam Ramrao Ingole	11,348	5.98%	▼0.85
Nota	None of the above	1,103	0.58%	▼0.37
Margin of victory		41,933	22.10%	▲9.39
Turnout		190,771	63.90%	▲2.84
Total valid votes		189,757		
Registered electors		298,540		▲2.29
INC hold		Swing	▲6.69	

=== Assembly Election 2019 ===
2019 Maharashtra Legislative Assembly election : Deglur
Party	Candidate	Votes	%	±%
INC	Raosaheb Antapurkar	89,407	50.67%	▲16.03
SS	Subhash Piraji Sabne	66,974	37.96%	▼1.83
VBA	Ramchandra Gangaram Bharande	12,057	6.83%	New
Independent	Balaji Baliram Bande	3,523	2.00%	New
NOTA	None of the above	1,676	0.95%	▼0.51
BSP	Savitribai Kamble Nagnikar	1,365	0.77%	▼1.40
Margin of victory		22,433	12.71%	▲7.56
Turnout		178,216	61.06%	▲2.31
Total valid votes		176,455		
Registered electors		291,870		▲0.51
INC gain from SS		Swing	▲10.88	

=== Assembly Election 2014 ===
2014 Maharashtra Legislative Assembly election : Deglur
Party	Candidate	Votes	%	±%
SS	Subhash Piraji Sabne	66,852	39.79%	▲2.10
INC	Raosaheb Antapurkar	58,204	34.64%	▼6.93
BJP	Bhimrao Mariba Kshirsagar	20,542	12.22%	New
NCP	Wadekar Maroti Mashnaji	12,126	7.22%	New
BSP	Dr. Shiddhodhan Laxman Kamble	3,641	2.17%	▲0.39
NOTA	None of the above	2,446	1.46%	New
Independent	Sangram Gangaram Suryavanshi	1,087	0.65%	New
Margin of victory		8,648	5.15%	▲1.27
Turnout		170,612	58.75%	▼2.32
Total valid votes		168,033		
Registered electors		290,397		▲14.42
SS gain from INC		Swing	▼1.78	

=== Assembly Election 2009 ===
2009 Maharashtra Legislative Assembly election : Deglur
Party	Candidate	Votes	%	±%
INC	Raosaheb Antapurkar	64,409	41.57%	▼13.94
SS	Subhash Piraji Sabne	58,398	37.69%	New
Independent	Wadekar Maroti Mashnaji	16,400	10.58%	New
BSP	Kharat Vilas Shankar	2,757	1.78%	New
Independent	Mandagikar Sambhaji Racchanna	2,682	1.73%	New
RPI(A)	Prof. Kamble Utamkumar Ramchandr	2,095	1.35%	New
Independent	Shaikh Iftekhar Shaikh Jabbar	1,931	1.25%	New
SBP	Kamble Ramchandra Sayaji	999	0.64%	New
Margin of victory		6,011	3.88%	▼33.44
Turnout		154,996	61.07%	▲17.90
Total valid votes		154,945		
Registered electors		253,801		▲150.78
INC hold		Swing	▼13.94	

=== Assembly Election 1972 ===
1972 Maharashtra Legislative Assembly election : Deglur
Party	Candidate	Votes	%	±%
INC	Sabne Peeraji Satwaji	23,318	55.51%	▲1.13
SSP	K. R. Sayajirao	7,642	18.19%	New
RPI	K. R. Hanmantrao	5,760	13.71%	▼24.69
ABJS	Kamble Digamber Satwaji	1,854	4.41%	New
RPI(K)	B. G. Haibati	1,517	3.61%	New
Independent	Kashinath Narayan Khune	1,087	2.59%	New
Independent	Banshewade Jalba	831	1.98%	New
Margin of victory		15,676	37.32%	▲21.34
Turnout		43,693	43.17%	▲10.16
Total valid votes		42,009		
Registered electors		101,203		▲14.81
INC hold		Swing	▲1.13	

=== Assembly Election 1967 ===
1967 Maharashtra Legislative Assembly election : Deglur
Party	Candidate	Votes	%	±%
INC	Madhukarrao Rangojirao Ghate	15,142	54.38%	▼6.83
RPI	K. Dhondiba	10,693	38.40%	New
Independent	K. Mallu	1,009	3.62%	New
Independent	D. S. Kambale	1,001	3.59%	New
Margin of victory		4,449	15.98%	▼4.57
Turnout		29,098	33.01%	▼21.54
Total valid votes		27,845		
Registered electors		88,145		▼17.76
INC hold		Swing	▲21.21	

=== Assembly Election 1952 ===
1952 Hyderabad State Legislative Assembly election : Deglur
Party	Candidate	Votes	%	±%
INC	Jaywant Rao	19,395	33.17%	New
INC	Ganpath Rao Manikrao	16,394	28.04%	New
PDF	Jai Ram Ramjee	7,377	12.62%	New
PDF	Harihar Nago Rao	6,912	11.82%	New
Socialist	Hanumant Bhagaram	5,042	8.62%	New
Independent	Nagnath Venkayya	3,352	5.73%	New
Margin of victory		12,018	20.55%	
Turnout		58,472	27.28%	
Total valid votes		58,472		
Registered electors		107,184		
INC win (new seat)				
