= Chandrakant Jadhav =

Indian politician (1964–2021)

Chandrakant Pandit Jadhav

Member of the Maharashtra Legislative Assembly
- In office November 2019 – November 2021
- Preceded by: Rajesh Vinayakrao Kshirsagar
- Succeeded by: Jayshri Jadhav
- Constituency: Kolhapur North

Personal details
- Born: Chandrakant Shankarrao Jadhav; 14 September 1964 Kolhapur
- Died: 21 November 2021 (aged 57)
- Party: Indian National Congress
- Spouse: Jayshri Jadhav
- Parent: Shankarrao Jadhav (father)

Chandrakant Jadhav (20 September 1964 – 21 November 2021) was an Indian politician. He served as Member of Maharashtra Legislative Assembly from Kolhapur North from 2019 to his death in November 2021, from post Covid-19 complications, representing Indian National Congress. After his death his wife Jayshri Jadhav was elected as an MLA of Kolhapur North.
