= Kolhapur North Assembly constituency =

Constituency of the Maharashtra legislative assembly in India

Coordinates: 16.74°N 74.25°E

Kolhapur North
- Constituency No. 276 for the Maharashtra Legislative Assembly

Constituency details
- Country: India
- Region: Western India
- State: Maharashtra
- District: Kolhapur
- Lok Sabha constituency: Kolhapur
- Established: 2008
- Total electors: 301,838
- Reservation: None

Member of Legislative Assembly
- 15th Maharashtra Legislative Assembly
- Incumbent Rajesh Kshirsagar
- Party: SHS
- Alliance: NDA
- Elected year: 2024

Kolhapur North Assembly constituency is one of the 288 Vidhan Sabha (legislative assembly) constituencies of Maharashtra state, western India. This constituency is located in Kolhapur district. It is a segment of Kolhapur (Lok Sabha constituency)

== Geographical scope ==
The constituency comprises ward nos. 1 to 14, 17 to 22, 24 to 42, 47 to 50, 52 to 56, 59, 60, 62, 63 & 65 of Kolhapur Municipal Corporation belonging to Karvir taluka.

== Members of the Legislative Assembly ==
Year	Member	Party
Before 2008: See Kolhapur
2009	Rajesh Kshirsagar	Shiv Sena
2014	Rajesh Kshirsagar	Shiv Sena
2019	Chandrakant Jadhav	Indian National Congress
2022^	Jayshri Jadhav	Indian National Congress
2024	Rajesh Kshirsagar	Shiv Sena

== Election results ==
=== Assembly Election 2024 ===
2024 Maharashtra Legislative Assembly election : Kolhapur North
Party	Candidate	Votes	%	±%
SS	Rajesh Vinayakrao Kshirsagar	111,085	56.45%	New
Independent	Rajesh Bharat Latkar	81,522	41.43%	New
NOTA	None of the Above	2,289	1.16%	▲0.15
MNS	Abhijeet Daulat Raut	2,036	1.03%	New
Margin of victory		29,563	15.02%	▲4.14
Turnout		199,066	65.95%	▲4.44
Total valid votes		196,777		
Registered electors		301,838		▲3.41
SS gain from INC		Swing	▲1.56	

=== Assembly By-election 2022 ===
2022 Maharashtra Legislative Assembly by-election : Kolhapur North
Party	Candidate	Votes	%	±%
INC	Jayshri Jadhav	97,332	54.89%	▲2.00
BJP	Satyajeet (Nana) Shivajirao Kadam	78,025	44.00%	New
NOTA	None of the Above	1,799	1.01%	▼0.75
Margin of victory		19,307	10.89%	▲2.06
Turnout		178,542	61.17%	▲0.61
Total valid votes		177,319		
Registered electors		291,893		▲1.97
INC hold		Swing	▲2.00	

=== Assembly Election 2019 ===
2019 Maharashtra Legislative Assembly election : Kolhapur North
Party	Candidate	Votes	%	±%
INC	Chandrakant Jadhav	91,053	52.89%	▲25.72
SS	Rajesh Vinayakrao Kshirsagar	75,854	44.06%	▲4.02
NOTA	None of the Above	3,039	1.77%	▲0.98
CPI	Satishchandra Balkrishna Kamble	1,483	0.86%	▼0.00
VBA	Rahul Anadpind Rajhans	1,154	0.67%	New
Margin of victory		15,199	8.83%	▼4.04
Turnout		175,325	61.25%	▼1.02
Total valid votes		172,168		
Registered electors		286,265		▲0.52
INC gain from SS		Swing	▲12.85	

=== Assembly Election 2014 ===
2014 Maharashtra Legislative Assembly election : Kolhapur North
Party	Candidate	Votes	%	±%
SS	Rajesh Vinayakrao Kshirsagar	69,736	40.04%	▼5.95
INC	Satyajeet (Nana) Shivajirao Kadam	47,315	27.16%	▼16.41
BJP	Mahesh Balasaheb Jadhav	40,104	23.02%	New
NCP	Rausaheb Khanderao Alias R K Powar	9,887	5.68%	New
CPI	Raghunath Vishnu Kamble	1,504	0.86%	▼1.42
NOTA	None of the Above	1,372	0.79%	New
MNS	Salokhe Suresh Balvant	1,280	0.73%	▼0.94
BSP	Prof. D. Shrikant	1,120	0.64%	▼0.43
Margin of victory		22,421	12.87%	▲10.45
Turnout		175,644	61.68%	▲3.81
Total valid votes		174,177		
Registered electors		284,785		▲7.11
SS hold		Swing	▼5.95	

=== Assembly Election 2009 ===
2009 Maharashtra Legislative Assembly election : Kolhapur North
Party	Candidate	Votes	%	±%
SS	Rajesh Vinayakrao Kshirsagar	70,129	45.99%	New
INC	Chhatrapati Malojiraje Shahu	66,442	43.57%	New
JSS	Ramchandra Alias Rambhau Bapuso Chavan	5,395	3.54%	New
CPI	Comrade Dilip Dattajirao Pawar	3,479	2.28%	New
MNS	Uday Rajaram Powar	2,560	1.68%	New
BSP	Ajay Prakash Kurane	1,642	1.08%	New
Margin of victory		3,687	2.42%	
Turnout		152,643	57.41%	
Total valid votes		152,483		
Registered electors		265,893		
SS win (new seat)				
