= Tanaji Sakharamji Mutkule =

Indian politician

Member of the Maharashtra Legislative Assembly
- Incumbent
- Assumed office 2014
- Preceded by: Bhaurao Baburao Patil
- Constituency: Hingoli

Personal details
- Party: Bharatiya Janata Party

Tanaji Sakharamji Mutkule is a member of the 13th Maharashtra Legislative Assembly. He represents the Hingoli Assembly Constituency. He belongs to the Bharatiya Janata Party (BJP). He won election 3 times in 2014, 2019 and 2024 continuously.

== Career ==
He has been a member of the Hingoli Zilla Parishad, representing the BJP. He has been credited with building and strengthening BJP's organisation between 2005-2009. In 2009, he had contested the Hingoli assembly seat unsuccessfully as a BJP candidate, losing to Bhaurao Baburao Patil of the Indian National Congress by a narrow margin of 2000 votes. Mutkule has been BJP Hingoli district president. In 2014 election contest he won and became MLA. In 2024 general assembly election he won the election and become MLA thrice against ZP sabhapati Mrs. Rupali Patil Goregoankar of Shivsena UBT by margin of 12 thousand votes and become a mla 3rd time .
