= Rajesh Vinayakrao Kshirsagar =

Indian politician

Rajesh Kshirsagar

Executive president of Maharashtra state planning commission
- In office 2009–2019
- Succeeded by: Chandrakant Jadhav

Member of the Maharashtra Legislative Assembly
- Preceded by: Constituency created
- Constituency: Kolhapur North
- Incumbent
- Assumed office 2024
- Preceded by: Jayshri Jadhav
- Constituency: Kolhapur North

Personal details
- Born: 24 November 1968 (age 57)
- Party: Shiv Sena
- Website: rajeshkshirsagar.com

Rajesh Vinayakrao Kshirsagar (Marathi: राजेश विनायकराव क्षीरसागर; born 24 November 1968) is a Shiv Sena politician from Kolhapur district, Maharashtra. He is the Executive President of Maharashtra State Planning Commission. He represents Kolhapur North (Vidhan Sabha constituency) in the Maharashtra Legislative Assembly. He has been elected for 2 terms to the Maharashtra Legislative Assembly in 2009 and 2014.

== Positions held ==
- 2009: Elected to Maharashtra Legislative Assembly (1st term)
- 2014: Re-Elected to Maharashtra Legislative Assembly (2nd term)
- 2019: Appointed Executive president of Maharashtra state planning commission
- 2024: Re-Elected to Maharashtra Legislative Assembly (3rd term)
