= Vallabh Benke =

Indian politician

Vellabh Dattaray Benke was an Indian politician. He was elected to the Maharashtra Legislative Assembly from Junnar in the 1985 1990, 2004, 2009 Maharashtra Legislative Assembly election.

== Death ==
Vallabh Benke was admitted due to a brief illness at a private hospital in Chakan town near Pune and died on 11 February 2024. He was survived by his wife and three sons, including NCP ex MLA Atul Benke.
