= Jitesh Antapurkar =

Indian politician

Jitesh Raosaheb Antapurkar

Member of the Maharashtra Legislative Assembly
- Incumbent
- Assumed office 20 November 2024

Member of the Maharashtra Legislative Assembly
- In office 2021 – 20 November 2024
- Preceded by: Raosaheb Antapurkar
- Constituency: Deglur

Personal details
- Born: 30 December 1989 (age 36)
- Party: Bhartiya Janata Party (August 2024-Present)
- Other political affiliations: Indian National Congress (Until 2024)
- Parent: Raosaheb Antapurkar (Father)
- Occupation: Politician

Jitesh Raosaheb Antapurkar (born 30 December 1989) is a leader of Bharatiya Janata Party, Maharashtra representing Maharashtra Legislative Assembly elected from Deglur Assembly constituency and former Member of Indian National Congress. He was elected in by-election after his father died in Maharashtra Legislative Assembly elected from Deglur Assembly constituency in Nanded city.

== Positions held ==
- 2021^: Legislative assembly By-elections Maharashtra Legislative Assembly.
- 2024: Elected as member Maharashtra legislative Assembly as a BJP candidate.
