= Jayshri Jadhav =

Indian politician

Jayshri Jadhav is an Indian politician and widow of Chandrakant Jadhav who is elected as Member of 14th Maharashtra Legislative Assembly in 2022 Legislative Assembly by-elections from Kolhapur North Assembly constituency. She is the first woman since independence who was elected as MLA from Kolhapur.
