= Raosaheb Antapurkar =

Indian politician (1958–2021)

lMember of the Maharashtra Legislative Assembly
- In office (2009-2014), (2019 – 2021)
- Preceded by: Bhaskarrao Bapurao Khatgaonkar Patil
- Succeeded by: Jitesh Antapurkar
- Constituency: Deglur

Personal details
- Born: 12 August 1958
- Died: 9 April 2021 (aged 62)
- Party: Indian National Congress
- Children: Jitesh Antapurkar
- Profession: Politician

Raosaheb Antapurkar (12 August 1958 – 9 April 2021) was an Indian politician.

== Biography ==
Antapurkar represented Deglur in the Maharashtra Legislative Assembly as a member of the Indian National Congress from 2019 till his death in 2021.

He died from COVID-19 on 9 April 2021, at the age of 63, during the COVID-19 pandemic in India.
