= Nagpur Rural =

Lok Sabha constituency in Maharashtra

Nagpur Rural is a taluka in Nagpur subdivision of Nagpur district of Maharashtra in India. It is a part of one Lok Sabha Constituency, (Ramtek) and three Maharashtra Assembly constituencies

No.	Constituency	Member	Party
48	Katol	Anil Deshmukh	NCP(SP)
50	Hingna	Sameer Meghe	BJP
58	Kamthi	Tekchand Sawarkar	BJP
