= Achalpur Assembly constituency =

Constituency of the Maharashtra legislative assembly in India

Coordinates: 21°15′41.26″N 77°30′35.65″E

Achalpur
- Constituency No. 42 for the Maharashtra Legislative Assembly
- Omprakash Kadu, present MLA of Achalpur

Constituency details
- Country: India
- Region: Western India
- State: Maharashtra
- District: Amravati
- Lok Sabha constituency: Amravati
- Established: 1952
- Total electors: 292,703
- Reservation: None

Member of Legislative Assembly
- 15th Maharashtra Legislative Assembly
- Incumbent Pravin Tayade
- Party: BJP
- Alliance: NDA
- Elected year: 2024

Achalpur Assembly constituency is one of the 288 constituencies of Maharashtra Vidhan Sabha and one of the eight which are located in Amravati district.

Achalpur Vidhan Sabha seat is a part of Amravati (Lok Sabha constituency) along with five other Vidhan Sabha assembly constituencies viz. Badnera, Amravati, Teosa, Daryapur (SC) and Melghat (ST) .

As per orders of Delimitation of Parliamentary and Assembly constituencies Order, 2008, No. 42 Achalpur Assembly constituency is composed of the following: 1. Chandurbazar Tehsil, 2. Achalpur Tehsil (Part), Revenue Circle-Shirajgaon Kasba, Achalpur and Achalpur (MC) of the district.

In 2019, Mr Bachchu Kadu was elected as the MLA from Achalpur.

== Members of the Legislative Assembly ==
Election	Member	Party
1952	Amrutrao Ganpatrao Sonar	Indian National Congress
1957	Madhavrao Bhagwantrao Patil	Indian National Congress
1962	Annasaheb alias Narayan Sadashivrao Watane	Independent politician
1967	Narsingrao Sheshrao Deshmukh	Indian National Congress
1972	Narsingrao Sheshrao Deshmukh	Indian National Congress
1978	Waman Bajirao Bhokare	Independent politician
1980	Sudam Alias Waman Dattatraya Deshmukh	Communist Party of India
1985	Sudam Alias Waman Dattatraya Deshmukh	Independent politician
1990	Vinayakrao Marotrao Korde	Bharatiya Janata Party
1995	Vinayakrao Marotrao Korde	Bharatiya Janata Party
1999	Vasudhatai Pundlikrao Deshmukh	Indian National Congress
2004	Bachchu Kadu	Independent politician
2009	Bachchu Kadu	Independent politician
2014	Bachchu Kadu	Independent politician
2019	Bachchu Kadu	Prahar Janshakti Party
2024	Pravin Tayade	Bharatiya Janata Party

== Election results ==
=== Assembly Election 2024 ===
2024 Maharashtra Legislative Assembly election : Achalpur
Party	Candidate	Votes	%	±%
BJP	Pravin Vasantrao Tayade	78,201	36.82%	New
PHJSP	Bachchu Kadu	66,070	31.11%	▼13.13
INC	Anirudha Alias Babalubhau Subhanrao Deshmukh	62,791	29.57%	▼10.10
NOTA	None of the above	298	0.14%	▼0.67
Margin of victory		12,131	5.71%	▲1.14
Turnout		212,672	72.66%	▲5.35
Total valid votes		212,374		
Registered electors		292,703		▲6.34
BJP gain from PHJSP		Swing	▼7.42	

=== Assembly Election 2019 ===
2019 Maharashtra Legislative Assembly election : Achalpur
Party	Candidate	Votes	%	±%
PHJSP	Bachchu Kadu	81,252	44.24%	New
INC	Anirudha Alias Babalubhau Subhanrao Deshmukh	72,856	39.67%	▲24.86
SS	Sunita Narendrarao Fiske	15,064	8.20%	▲4.96
AIMIM	Abdul Nazim Abdul Rauf	6,329	3.45%	New
VBA	Nandesh Sheshrao Ambadkar	3,355	1.83%	New
RPI	Dr. Rajendra Ramkrishna Gawai	2,591	1.41%	▼0.86
NOTA	None of the above	1,496	0.81%	▲0.56
Independent	Rahul Kadu	1,152	0.63%	New
Margin of victory		8,396	4.57%	▼1.11
Turnout		185,270	67.31%	▼3.54
Total valid votes		183,665		
Registered electors		275,255		▲8.66
PHJSP gain from Independent		Swing	▲11.13	

=== Assembly Election 2014 ===
2014 Maharashtra Legislative Assembly election : Achalpur
Party	Candidate	Votes	%	±%
Independent	Bachchu Kadu	59,234	33.11%	New
BJP	Ashok Shridharpant Bansod	49,064	27.42%	New
INC	Anirudha Alias Babalubhau Subhanrao Deshmukh	26,490	14.81%	▼21.37
BSP	Mo. Rafique Shekh Gulab	20,602	11.51%	▲10.73
SS	Surekha Surendra Thakare	5,791	3.24%	▼13.12
RPI	Abhyankar Pratap Mahadeorao	4,068	2.27%	New
NCP	Vasudhatai Pundlikrao Deshmukh	3,274	1.83%	New
Independent	Arun Motiram Wankhade	1,923	1.07%	New
NOTA	None of the above	449	0.25%	New
Margin of victory		10,170	5.68%	▲1.89
Turnout		179,467	70.85%	▲5.72
Total valid votes		178,917		
Registered electors		253,318		▲8.72
Independent hold		Swing	▼6.86	

=== Assembly Election 2009 ===
2009 Maharashtra Legislative Assembly election : Achalpur
Party	Candidate	Votes	%	±%
Independent	Bachchu Kadu	60,627	39.97%	New
INC	Vasudhatai Pundlikrao Deshmukh	54,884	36.18%	▲1.59
SS	Anantrao Gudhe	24,824	16.36%	New
Independent	Yogesh Madhukarrao Pawar	2,831	1.87%	New
BSP	Mohod Bhimrao Bhopiji	1,184	0.78%	New
Independent	Shekh Abdul Shekh Haidar	1,029	0.68%	New
Margin of victory		5,743	3.79%	▲0.14
Turnout		151,748	65.13%	▼7.92
Total valid votes		151,691		
Registered electors		233,004		▲15.24
Independent hold		Swing	▲1.73	

=== Assembly Election 2004 ===
2004 Maharashtra Legislative Assembly election : Achalpur
Party	Candidate	Votes	%	±%
Independent	Bachchu Kadu	56,471	38.24%	New
INC	Vasudhatai Pundlikrao Deshmukh	51,085	34.59%	▲4.46
BJP	Vinayakrao Marutirao Korde	31,475	21.31%	▼5.82
Independent	Shivcharan Shankarsa Chede	3,190	2.16%	New
BBM	Phuse Namdeo Sampatrao	1,886	1.28%	New
Independent	Chaukhande Mohan Ganeshrao	1,433	0.97%	New
Margin of victory		5,386	3.65%	▲1.73
Turnout		147,711	73.05%	▲4.28
Total valid votes		147,678		
Registered electors		202,196		▲12.61
Independent gain from INC		Swing	▲8.11	

=== Assembly Election 1999 ===
1999 Maharashtra Legislative Assembly election : Achalpur
Party	Candidate	Votes	%	±%
INC	Vasudhatai Pundlikrao Deshmukh	35,006	30.13%	▲12.12
Independent	Bachchu Kadu	32,775	28.21%	New
BJP	Vinayakrao Marutirao Korde	31,518	27.13%	▼8.81
Independent	Dr. Suresh Bhausaheb Thakre	9,053	7.79%	New
SBP	Surekha Surendra Thakare	7,826	6.74%	New
Margin of victory		2,231	1.92%	▼10.59
Turnout		123,484	68.77%	▼5.08
Total valid votes		116,178		
Registered electors		179,553		▼0.11
INC gain from BJP		Swing	▼5.81	

=== Assembly Election 1995 ===
1995 Maharashtra Legislative Assembly election : Achalpur
Party	Candidate	Votes	%	±%
BJP	Vinayak Korde	46,881	35.94%	▼2.84
Independent	Dr. Suresh Bhausaheb Thakre	30,567	23.43%	New
INC	Niyaz Ahemadkhan Niyamatkhan	23,499	18.01%	▼1.21
BBM	Mohammed Jahirulhasan (Jahirbhai)	8,787	6.74%	New
Independent	Nandatai Abhyankar	4,524	3.47%	New
Independent	Suresh Uttamrao Ladole	2,482	1.90%	New
Independent	Govindrao Barkaji Nanhe	2,286	1.75%	New
Turnout		132,753	73.85%	▲12.71
Total valid votes		130,457		
Registered electors		179,755		▲12.63
BJP hold		Swing	▼2.84	

=== Assembly Election 1990 ===
1990 Maharashtra Legislative Assembly election : Achalpur
Party	Candidate	Votes	%	±%
BJP	Vinayak Korde	37,287	38.78%	New
INC	Babanrao Alias Dattaraya Magorao Metkar	18,476	19.22%	▼6.86
Independent	M. Jahirul Hasan (Jahir Bhai)	15,684	16.31%	New
Independent	Ijajoddin Alias Babubhai Mohimoodin	7,225	7.51%	New
CPI	Admane Nanasaheb Laxman	6,038	6.28%	New
Independent	Chaudhari Arun Vishwanathrao	5,117	5.32%	New
Independent	Ashok Ingale Vidrohi	1,147	1.19%	New
Independent	Sirsat Dnyaneshwar Somaji	799	0.83%	New
Margin of victory		18,811	19.57%	▼3.88
Turnout		97,576	61.14%	▼2.10
Total valid votes		96,144		
Registered electors		159,593		▲29.11
BJP gain from Independent		Swing	▼10.75	

=== Assembly Election 1985 ===
1985 Maharashtra Legislative Assembly election : Achalpur
Party	Candidate	Votes	%	±%
Independent	Sudam Alias Waman Dattaraya Deshmukh	38,211	49.53%	New
INC	Sunil Panjabrao Deshmukh	20,123	26.08%	New
Independent	Mohamad Jahirulhasan Mo. Latifoddin	10,874	14.10%	New
Independent	Panjab Uttamrao Tantarpale	4,673	6.06%	New
RPI	Kisanrao Bajirao Wankhade	1,607	2.08%	New
Independent	Niyaz Ahamadkhan Niyamatkhan	988	1.28%	New
Margin of victory		18,088	23.45%	▼31.13
Turnout		78,179	63.24%	▲6.38
Total valid votes		77,147		
Registered electors		123,614		▲8.51
Independent gain from CPI		Swing	▼26.10	

=== Assembly Election 1980 ===
1980 Maharashtra Legislative Assembly election : Achalpur
Party	Candidate	Votes	%	±%
CPI	Sudam Alias Waman Dattaraya Deshmukh	47,989	75.63%	▲46.43
INC(I)	Waman Bajirao Bhokare	13,359	21.05%	New
INC(U)	Bhimrao Bakaramji Thakare	1,663	2.62%	New
Margin of victory		34,630	54.58%	▲53.67
Turnout		64,777	56.86%	▼18.67
Total valid votes		63,453		
Registered electors		113,917		▲5.06
CPI gain from Independent		Swing	▲45.51	

=== Assembly Election 1978 ===
1978 Maharashtra Legislative Assembly election : Achalpur
Party	Candidate	Votes	%	±%
Independent	Waman Bajirao Bhokare	24,178	30.12%	New
CPI	Sudam Alias Waman Dattaraya Deshmukh	23,446	29.20%	New
INC	Narsingrao Sheshrao Deshmukh	10,560	13.15%	▼62.91
Independent	Vinayak Marutirao Korde	9,346	11.64%	New
JP	Gangadhar Sadashiv Watane	8,535	10.63%	New
Margin of victory		732	0.91%	▼56.10
Turnout		81,896	75.53%	▲9.90
Total valid votes		80,284		
Registered electors		108,430		▲7.85
Independent gain from INC		Swing	▼45.94	

=== Assembly Election 1972 ===
1972 Maharashtra Legislative Assembly election : Achalpur
Party	Candidate	Votes	%	±%
INC	Narsingrao Sheshrao Deshmukh	48,971	76.06%	▲27.29
RPI	Kisan Bajirao Wankhade	12,266	19.05%	New
ABJS	Haware Kashinath Baliram	3,151	4.89%	▲0.05
Margin of victory		36,705	57.01%	▲39.92
Turnout		65,985	65.63%	▼8.28
Total valid votes		64,388		
Registered electors		100,535		▲7.54
INC hold		Swing	▲27.29	

=== Assembly Election 1967 ===
1967 Maharashtra Legislative Assembly election : Achalpur
Party	Candidate	Votes	%	±%
INC	Narsingrao Sheshrao Deshmukh	31,002	48.77%	▲1.81
CPI	Sudam Alias Waman Dattatraya Deshmukh	20,135	31.67%	New
Independent	Madhaorao Bhagwantrao Patil	8,022	12.62%	New
ABJS	Haware Kashinath Baliram	3,075	4.84%	New
Independent	H. G. Bobade	829	1.30%	New
Independent	S. G. Guldeokar	507	0.80%	New
Margin of victory		10,867	17.09%	▲13.53
Turnout		69,095	73.91%	▼5.84
Total valid votes		63,570		
Registered electors		93,483		▲17.14
INC gain from Independent		Swing	▼1.75	

=== Assembly Election 1962 ===
1962 Maharashtra Legislative Assembly election : Achalpur
Party	Candidate	Votes	%	±%
Independent	Annasaheb alias Narayan Sadashivrao Watane	30,184	50.52%	New
INC	Krishnarao Gulabrao Deshmukh	28,056	46.96%	▲0.94
Independent	Devidas Tukaram Wanjori	913	1.53%	New
Margin of victory		2,128	3.56%	▼12.35
Turnout		63,644	79.75%	▲8.76
Total valid votes		59,744		
Registered electors		79,805		▲10.35
Independent gain from INC		Swing	▲4.50	

=== Assembly Election 1957 ===
1957 Bombay State Legislative Assembly election : Achalpur
Party	Candidate	Votes	%	±%
INC	Madhaorao Bhagwantrao Patil	23,625	46.02%	▲18.19
CPI	Sudam alias Waman Dattatraya Deshmukh	15,458	30.11%	▲5.48
Independent	Mir Riyayatali Mir Ahmadali	6,848	13.34%	New
Independent	Deshmukh Laxmanrao Vithalrao	4,463	8.69%	New
Independent	Patil Vishwasrao Amrutrao	942	1.83%	New
Margin of victory		8,167	15.91%	▲12.71
Turnout		51,336	70.99%	▲13.41
Total valid votes		51,336		
Registered electors		72,318		▲42.46
INC hold		Swing	▲18.19	

=== Assembly Election 1952 ===
1952 Hyderabad State Legislative Assembly election : Achalpur
Party	Candidate	Votes	%	±%
INC	Amritrao Ganpatrao Sonar	8,136	27.83%	New
CPI	Sudam Alias Waman Dattatraya Deshmukh	7,200	24.63%	New
Socialist	Annasaheb alias Narayan Sadashiv Watane	4,170	14.27%	New
Independent	Md. Nagarkhan Malekhan	4,102	14.03%	New
Independent	Laxman Baliram Bhokare	2,945	10.08%	New
Independent	Shankarrao Daulatrao Dange	721	2.47%	New
Independent	Atmaram Sadashiv Chitrakar	635	2.17%	New
Margin of victory		936	3.20%	
Turnout		29,230	57.58%	
Total valid votes		29,230		
Registered electors		50,763		
INC win (new seat)				

== See also ==
- Achalpur
- List of constituencies of Maharashtra Legislative Assembly
