= Raju Devnath Parwe =

Indian politician

- Rajubhau Parwe

Member of Maharashtra Legislative Assembly
- In office 2019–2024
- Preceded by: Sudhir Laxmanrao Parwe
- Succeeded by: Sanjay Meshram
- Constituency: Umred

Personal details
- Born: *Bhiwapur SubDivision , Umred, Nagpur, Maharashtra
- Party: Bharatiya Janata Party (BJP) (2024-Present)
- Other political affiliations: Shiv Sena (SHS) (2024); Indian National Congress (INC) (2015-2024); Independent (2014)
- Profession: Politician

Raju Devnath Parwe is a leader of Bharatiya Janata Party (BJP) and a former member of the Maharashtra Legislative Assembly elected from Umred Assembly constituency in Nagpur city.

== Positions held ==
2019: Elected to Maharashtra Legislative Assembly with 91,968 votes.

=== Political career ===
In 2015 Raju Parwe joined the Indian National Congress (INC). Before that, in 2014 he unsuccessfully fought from Umred Vidhan Sabha Seat as an independent candidate and lost by a margin of 68,002 votes. In 2019, the Congress Party offered him a ticket from Umred Vidhan Sabha Seat and he won by a margin of 18,029 votes. On 24 March 2024, Raju Parwe left the Congress Party as he was denied ticket from Ramtek Lok Sabha Seat. He Joined Eknath Shinde Led Shiv Sena (SHS) and got the ticket.

On 4 June 2024, Raju Parwe Lost To Indian National Congress Candidate, Shyamkumar (Bablu) Barve from Ramtek Lok Sabha Seat By A Margin Of 76,768 Votes.
