= Teosa Assembly constituency =

Constituency of the Maharashtra legislative assembly in India

Coordinates: 21.09°N 78.07°E

Teosa
- Constituency No. 39 for the Maharashtra Legislative Assembly

Constituency details
- Country: India
- Region: Western India
- State: Maharashtra
- District: Amravati
- Lok Sabha constituency: Amravati
- Established: 1978
- Total electors: 296,916
- Reservation: None

Member of Legislative Assembly
- 15th Maharashtra Legislative Assembly
- Incumbent Rajesh Shriramji Wankhade
- Party: BJP
- Alliance: NDA
- Elected year: 2024

Teosa Assembly constituency is one of the 288 constituencies of Maharashtra Vidhan Sabha and one of the eight present in Amravati district.

Teosa is a part of the Vidhan Sabha assembly constituencies along with five other, viz. Badnera, Amravati, Daryapur (SC), Melghat (ST) and Achalpur.

The remaining two constituencies, Dhamangaon Railway and Morshi, are part of Wardha Lok Sabha constituency in adjoining Wardha district.

As per orders of Delimitation of Parliamentary and Assembly constituencies Order, 2008, No. 39 Teosa Assembly constituency is composed of the following: 1. Teosa Tehsil, 2. Morshi Tehsil (Part), Revenue Circle - Ner Pinglai and Dhamangaon, 3. Amravati Tehsil (Part), Revenue Circle - Shirala, Mahuli Jahangir, Nandgaon Peth and Walgaon and 4. Bhatkuli Tehsil (Part), Revenue Circle – Ashti and Kholapur of the Amravati district.

== Members of the Legislative Assembly ==
Year	Member	Party
1978	Chandrakant alias Bhaiyyasaheb Thakur	Independent
1980	Chandrakant alias Bhaiyyasaheb Thakur	Indian National Congress (I)
1985	Sharad Tasare	Indian Congress (Socialist)
1990	Nattu Mangale	Communist Party of India
1995	Sharad Tasare	Indian National Congress
1999	Sahebrao Thatte	Bharatiya Janata Party
2004	Sahebrao Thatte	Bharatiya Janata Party
2009	Yashomati Thakur	Indian National Congress
2014	Yashomati Thakur	Indian National Congress
2019	Yashomati Thakur	Indian National Congress
2024	Rajesh Wankhade	Bharatiya Janata Party

== Election results ==
=== Assembly Election 2024 ===
2024 Maharashtra Legislative Assembly election : Teosa
Party	Candidate	Votes	%	±%
BJP	Rajesh Shriramji Wankhade	99,664	49.26%	New
INC	Yashomati Chandrakant Thakur	92,047	45.49%	▲1.32
VBA	Milind Shriramji Tayade	6,710	3.32%	▼5.00
NOTA	None of the Above	635	0.31%	▼0.34
Margin of victory		7,617	3.76%	▼2.24
Turnout		202,963	68.36%	▲9.66
Total valid votes		202,328		
Registered electors		296,916		▲0.31
BJP gain from INC		Swing	▲5.09	

=== Assembly Election 2019 ===
2019 Maharashtra Legislative Assembly election : Teosa
Party	Candidate	Votes	%	±%
INC	Yashomati Chandrakant Thakur	76,218	44.17%	▲9.39
SS	Rajesh Shriramji Wankhade	65,857	38.17%	▲21.21
VBA	Dipak Devrao Sardar	14,353	8.32%	New
PHJSP	Chhotu Maharaj Wasu (Pawan Vijay Wasu)	10,598	6.14%	New
BSP	Abdul Naim Abdul Jalil	3,147	1.82%	▼4.89
NOTA	None of the Above	1,131	0.66%	▼0.09
Margin of victory		10,361	6.00%	▼6.09
Turnout		173,752	58.70%	▼3.81
Total valid votes		172,545		
Registered electors		295,992		▲9.46
INC hold		Swing	▲9.39	

=== Assembly Election 2014 ===
2014 Maharashtra Legislative Assembly election : Teosa
Party	Candidate	Votes	%	±%
INC	Yashomati Chandrakant Thakur	58,808	34.79%	▼14.53
BJP	Nivedita Dighade Choudhari	38,367	22.70%	New
SS	Dinesh Vaikunthrao Wankhade	28,671	16.96%	▼14.72
BSP	Sanjay Gunwantrao Lawhale	11,354	6.72%	▼1.27
Independent	Dr. Sanyogita Satyajit Naik Nimbalkar	9,945	5.88%	New
MNS	Akash Anil Warhade	6,390	3.78%	New
NCP	Prof. Sahebrao Ramchandra Tatte	4,066	2.41%	New
NOTA	None of the Above	1,258	0.74%	New
Margin of victory		20,441	12.09%	▼5.55
Turnout		170,384	63.01%	▲1.76
Total valid votes		169,048		
Registered electors		270,408		▲10.91
INC hold		Swing	▼14.53	

=== Assembly Election 2009 ===
2009 Maharashtra Legislative Assembly election : Teosa
Party	Candidate	Votes	%	±%
INC	Yashomati Chandrakant Thakur	73,054	49.32%	▲21.15
SS	Band Sanjay Raosaheb	46,924	31.68%	New
BSP	Dr. Chandrasekhar Ramdaspanth Kuralkar	11,834	7.99%	▲1.46
CPI	Sabirhusen Ahmedhusen	4,735	3.20%	▼8.48
Independent	Sanjay Prabhakarrao Deshmukh	4,674	3.16%	New
Independent	Sandesh Surybhanji Meshram	1,484	1.00%	New
Independent	Dr. Ganesh Kharkar	1,369	0.92%	New
Margin of victory		26,130	17.64%	▲11.52
Turnout		148,167	60.77%	▼6.13
Total valid votes		148,129		
Registered electors		243,802		▲43.76
INC gain from BJP		Swing	▲15.03	

=== Assembly Election 2004 ===
2004 Maharashtra Legislative Assembly election : Teosa
Party	Candidate	Votes	%	±%
BJP	Sahebrao Ramchandra Tatte	38,894	34.29%	▼3.95
INC	Yashomati Bhayyasaheb Thakur	31,956	28.17%	▼8.84
CPI	Mangale Sanjay Nanasaheb	13,246	11.68%	▲7.54
BSP	Prof. Anand J. Tayade	7,405	6.53%	New
Independent	Ashok Haribhau Rode	5,645	4.98%	New
Independent	Gangadhar Gade	5,179	4.57%	New
Rashtriya Samajik Nayak Paksha	Balasaheb Ashadevi Pandurangji Korate	4,809	4.24%	New
Margin of victory		6,938	6.12%	▲4.90
Turnout		113,454	66.90%	▲5.02
Total valid votes		113,432		
Registered electors		169,587		▲13.70
BJP hold		Swing	▼3.95	

=== Assembly Election 1999 ===
1999 Maharashtra Legislative Assembly election : Teosa
Party	Candidate	Votes	%	±%
BJP	Sahebrao Ramchandra Tatte	35,282	38.23%	▲28.19
INC	Chandrakant Alias Bhaiyasaheb Ramchandra Thakur	34,157	37.01%	▲12.23
NCP	Tasare Sharad Motiram	16,661	18.05%	New
CPI	Ashok Shiodatta Sonarkar	3,816	4.14%	▼11.88
CPI(M)	Vijaya Singh Bhaboot Singh Thakur	1,393	1.51%	New
Independent	Gohatre Tulshidas Vyankatrao	808	0.88%	New
Margin of victory		1,125	1.22%	▼7.56
Turnout		97,236	65.19%	▼12.46
Total valid votes		92,280		
Registered electors		149,159		▲1.56
BJP gain from INC		Swing	▲13.45	

=== Assembly Election 1995 ===
1995 Maharashtra Legislative Assembly election : Teosa
Party	Candidate	Votes	%	±%
INC	Tasare Sharad Motiram	27,062	24.79%	▼3.33
CPI	Mangale Nanasaheb Ganpat	17,481	16.01%	▼13.69
Independent	Thakur Chandrakant Alias Bhyyasaheb Ramchandra	15,762	14.44%	New
Independent	Kolhe Sanjay Shivling	11,524	10.56%	New
BJP	Tatte Sahabrao Ramchandra	10,967	10.05%	New
PWPI	Ingle Vijay Marotrao	10,334	9.47%	▲4.78
Independent	Dinesh Waikuntharao Wankhade	4,897	4.49%	New
Margin of victory		9,581	8.78%	▲7.19
Turnout		111,410	75.86%	▲11.82
Total valid votes		109,171		
Registered electors		146,872		▲11.50
INC gain from CPI		Swing	▼4.92	

=== Assembly Election 1990 ===
1990 Maharashtra Legislative Assembly election : Teosa
Party	Candidate	Votes	%	±%
CPI	Mangle Natthuji Dewaji	24,459	29.70%	New
INC	Tasare Sharad Motiram	23,154	28.12%	▼9.10
SS	Wankhade Denish Waikuntharao	11,934	14.49%	New
RPI(K)	Meshram Gopichand Suryabhan	7,224	8.77%	New
Independent	Thakur Sanjay Ramchandra	3,890	4.72%	New
PWPI	Ingale Vijaybhau Marotrao	3,861	4.69%	New
BSP	Satare Sheshrao Chindhuji	2,249	2.73%	New
Margin of victory		1,305	1.58%	▼7.05
Turnout		84,066	63.82%	▼2.97
Total valid votes		82,343		
Registered electors		131,719		▲25.85
CPI gain from IC(S)		Swing	▼16.15	

=== Assembly Election 1985 ===
1985 Maharashtra Legislative Assembly election : Teosa
Party	Candidate	Votes	%	±%
IC(S)	Tasare Sharad Motiram	31,425	45.85%	New
INC	Deshmukh Vishwas Krushnarao	25,508	37.22%	New
Independent	Chavan Arun Shalikram	9,549	13.93%	New
RPI	Tayde Chirkut Gendaji	1,180	1.72%	New
Independent	Subhash Devidas Shrikhande	606	0.88%	New
Margin of victory		5,917	8.63%	▼7.69
Turnout		69,580	66.48%	▲9.96
Total valid votes		68,532		
Registered electors		104,661		▲9.03
IC(S) gain from INC(I)		Swing	▼0.07	

=== Assembly Election 1980 ===
1980 Maharashtra Legislative Assembly election : Teosa
Party	Candidate	Votes	%	±%
INC(I)	Thakur Chandrakant Ramchandra	24,480	45.93%	New
INC(U)	Tasare Sharad Motiram	15,778	29.60%	New
CPI	Mangle Natthuji Dewaji	9,710	18.22%	▼3.38
RPI(K)	Thakre Krishna Laxman	2,452	4.60%	New
Independent	Wankhade Krishna Laxman	807	1.51%	New
Margin of victory		8,702	16.33%	▼21.91
Turnout		54,490	56.76%	▼20.76
Total valid votes		53,300		
Registered electors		95,996		▲5.71
INC(I) gain from Independent		Swing	▼13.91	

=== Assembly Election 1978 ===
1978 Maharashtra Legislative Assembly election : Teosa
Party	Candidate	Votes	%	±%
Independent	Thakur Chandrakant Ramchandra	41,455	59.84%	New
CPI	Mangle Natthuji Dewaji	14,965	21.60%	New
JP	Chore Ajabrao Tanabaji	5,127	7.40%	New
INC	Bhole Uttam Mohanaji	4,075	5.88%	New
Independent	Thakare Krushna Bhaduji	3,366	4.86%	New
Margin of victory		26,490	38.24%	
Turnout		71,145	78.34%	
Total valid votes		69,276		
Registered electors		90,810		
Independent win (new seat)				
