= Vasudhatai Pundlikrao Deshmukh =

Indian politician

Vasudhatai Pundalikrao Deshmukh
- वसुधाताई पुंडलिकराव देशमुख

Minister of State Government of Maharashtra
- In office 1999–2004
- Minister: Water Resources.; Public Works (excluding Public Undertakings)
- Chief Minister: Vilasrao Deshmukh
- Deputy CM: Chhagan Bhujbal
- Guardian Minister: Amravati District

Member of Maharashtra Legislative Council
- In office 1986–1998
- Constituency: Elected by MLAs

Member of Maharashtra Legislative Assembly
- In office 1999–2004
- Preceded by: Vinayak Korde
- Succeeded by: Omprakash Babarao Kadu
- Constituency: Achalpur

Personal details
- Political party: Indian National Congress(till 2014) Nationalist Congress Party (2014–2024) Nationalist Congress Party (Sharadchandra Pawar)(2024-Present)
- Spouse: Pundlikrao Alias Nanasaheb Deshmukh

Vasudhatai Pundalikrao Deshmukh is an Indian politician from Maharashtra and a former member of the Indian National Congress. She was elected in 1999 to the Maharashtra Legislative Assembly from the Achalpur constituency and became State Minister in Vilasrao Deshmukh's Cabinet. Now she is in the Nationalist Congress Party.

== Guardian Minister of Amravati ==
She served as guardian minister for Amravati District from 1999 to 2004 in Vilasrao Deshmukh Government.
