= Chandrashekhar Bawankule =

Indian politician

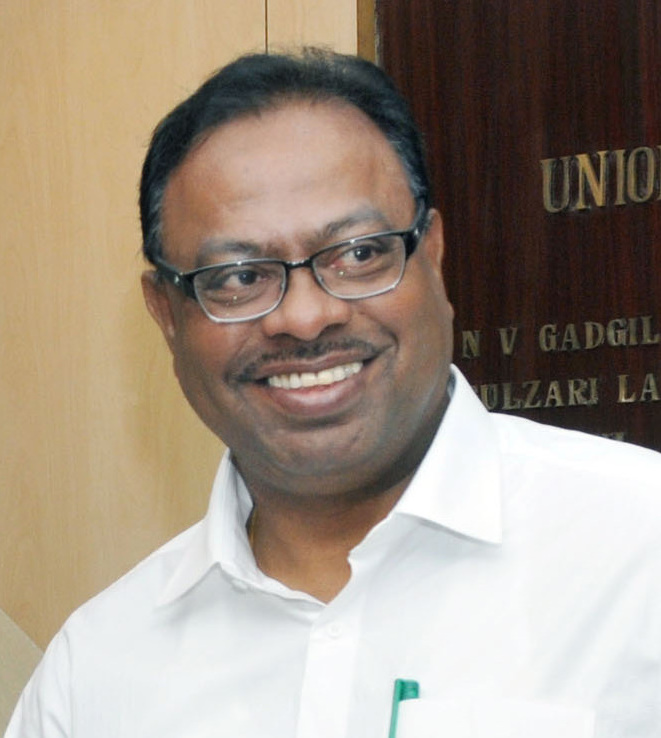

Minister of Revenue Government of Maharashtra
- Incumbent
- Assumed office 15 December 2024
- Chief Minister: Devendra Fadnavis
- Guardian Minister: Nagpur district, Amravati District
- Preceded by: Radhakrishna Vikhe Patil

President of Bharatiya Janata Party, Maharashtra
- In office 12 August 2022 – 1 July 2025
- Preceded by: Chandrakant Patil
- Succeeded by: Ravindra Chavan

Minister of Excise Government of Maharashtra
- In office 8 July 2016 – 8 November 2019
- Chief Minister: Devendra Fadnavis
- Preceded by: Eknath Khadse
- Succeeded by: Dilip Walse-Patil

Minister of Energy Government of Maharashtra
- In office 4 December 2014 – 8 November 2019
- Chief Minister: Devendra Fadnavis
- Preceded by: Ajit Pawar
- Succeeded by: Balasaheb Thorat

Member of the Maharashtra Legislative Council
- In office 2 January 2022 – 23 November 2024
- Preceded by: Girish Vyas
- Constituency: Nagpur Local Authorities

Member of the Maharashtra Legislative Assembly
- Incumbent
- Assumed office 23 November 2024
- Preceded by: Tekchand Sawarkar
- Constituency: Kamthi
- In office 2004–2019
- Preceded by: Sulekha Kumbhare
- Succeeded by: Tekchand Sawarkar
- Constituency: Kamthi

Personal details
- Born: 13 January 1969 (age 57) Koradi, Maharashtra, India
- Party: Bharatiya Janata Party
- Spouse: Jyoti Bawankule
- Children: Payal Bawanklule; Sanket Bawanklule
- Occupation: Politician
- Website: www.cbawankule.in

Chandrashekhar Krishnarao Bawankule was the former President of Bharatiya Janata Party – Maharashtra and a Member of 15th Maharashtra Legislative Assembly representing Kamthi Assembly constituency. He was a member of the 13th Maharashtra Legislative Assembly and Minister for Energy, New and Renewable Energy Maharashtra, Ministry of State Excise (Maharashtra), and also appointed the Guardian Minister of Nagpur on 26 December 2014.

As a member of the Bharatiya Janata Party (BJP), he represented the Kamptee Assembly Constituency, being elected from there in 2004, 2009 & 2014. In 2012, he was made Secretary of the Bhartiya Janata Party, Maharashtra State Unit in Devendra Fadnavis' team. In a cabinet expansion, he was given charge of the state excise department on 10 July 2016.

== Political career ==
Bawankule's career commenced in earnest in the early nineties, he started "Chhatrapati Sena" and continued its social work till 1994. In 1995, he joined the Bhartiya Janata Party under the leadership of Gopinath Munde and Nitin Gadkari. In the same year, he became the Vice President of the Bharatiya Janata Yuva Morcha, a youth wing of the BJP in Maharashtra.

In 1997 and 2002, Bawankule was elected as a District Council Member. In 2004, he was elected to the Maharashtra Legislative Assembly for the first time, from Kamthi Assembly constituency. He was reelected twice, in 2009 and 2014. Due to allegations of corruption, the BJP did not give Bawankule the ticket to contest Assembly elections in 2019. It was given to his wife Jyoti instead, but later rescinded from her as well.

=== Positions held ===
==== Within BJP ====
- President, Bharatiya Janata Party, Maharashtra, Since 12 August 2022
- Vice President, BJYM Nagpur District (1995)
- General Secretary, BJP Nagpur District
- President, Bhartiya Janata Party, Nagpur District
- Secretary, Maharashtra BJP State Unit (2012-2014)

==== Legislative ====
- Member, Zilha Parishad, Nagpur (1997 & 2002)
- Member, Maharashtra Legislative Assembly - Since 2004-2019
- Cabinet Minister Maharashtra, Energy, New & Renewable Energy
- Guardian Minister of Nagpur
- Member, Maharashtra Legislative Council - Since 2 Jan. 2022
- Member, Maharashtra Legislative Assembly - Since 2024-2029

Political offices
| Preceded by Devendra Fadnavis | Cabinet Minister for Energy, New and Renewable Energy; Maharashtra State; 2014–2019 | Succeeded by Balasaheb Thorat |
| Preceded by | Maharashtra State Guardian Minister for Nagpur district 2014–2019 | Incumbent |
