= Hingna Assembly constituency =

Constituency of the Maharashtra legislative assembly in India

Coordinates: 21.07°N 78.96°E

Hingna
- Constituency No. 50 for the Maharashtra Legislative Assembly

Constituency details
- Country: India
- Region: Western India
- State: Maharashtra
- District: Nagpur
- Lok Sabha constituency: Ramtek
- Established: 2008
- Total electors: 450,439
- Reservation: None

Member of Legislative Assembly
- 15th Maharashtra Legislative Assembly
- Incumbent Sameer Meghe
- Party: BJP
- Alliance: NDA
- Elected year: 2024

Hingna Assembly constituency is one of the twelve constituencies of the Maharashtra Vidhan Sabha located in the Nagpur district. It is a part of the Ramtek Lok Sabha constituency and comprises Hingna Tahsil and parts of Nagpur Tahsil, including the towns of Wadi, Davlameti, Sonegaon, SEZ Mihan and Jamtha, all in Nagpur district.

As of 2024, Sameer Meghe of the Bharatiya Janata Party represents the constituency.

== Members of the Legislative Assembly ==
Year	Member	Party
Till 2009 : Constituency did not exist
2009	Vijaybabu Ghodmare	Bharatiya Janata Party
2014	Sameer Meghe	Bharatiya Janata Party
2019	Sameer Meghe	Bharatiya Janata Party
2024	Sameer Meghe	Bharatiya Janata Party

== Election results ==
=== Assembly Election 2024 ===
2024 Maharashtra Legislative Assembly election : Hingna
Party	Candidate	Votes	%	±%
BJP	Sameer Dattatraya Meghe	160,206	59.41%	▲5.40
NCP-SP	Rameshchandra Gopikisan Bang	81,275	30.14%	New
VBA	Anirudhah Vitthal Shevale	8,164	3.03%	▼3.81
BSP	Devabhau Alias Dr. Devendra Ramkrushna Kaikade	7,497	2.78%	▼1.37
Independent	Derkar Tushar Pradeep	5,361	1.99%	New
NOTA	None of the above	1,876	0.70%	▼0.30
Margin of victory		78,931	29.27%	▲8.72
Turnout		271,517	60.28%	▲0.07
Total valid votes		269,641		
Registered electors		450,439		▲19.51
BJP hold		Swing	▲5.40	

=== Assembly Election 2019 ===
2019 Maharashtra Legislative Assembly election : Hingna
Party	Candidate	Votes	%	±%
BJP	Sameer Dattatraya Meghe	121,305	54.01%	▲11.87
NCP	Ghodmare Vijaybabu Pandurangji	75,138	33.45%	▲2.91
VBA	Nitesh Jivan Jangle	15,371	6.84%	New
BSP	Rahul Dhanraj Sontakke	9,320	4.15%	▼5.59
NOTA	None of the above	2,256	1.00%	▲0.64
Margin of victory		46,167	20.55%	▲8.95
Turnout		226,945	60.21%	▼5.97
Total valid votes		224,610		
Registered electors		376,915		▲24.36
BJP hold		Swing	▲11.87	

=== Assembly Election 2014 ===
2014 Maharashtra Legislative Assembly election : Hingna
Party	Candidate	Votes	%	±%
BJP	Sameer Dattatraya Meghe	84,139	42.14%	▲1.85
NCP	Bang Rameshchandra Gopikisan	60,981	30.54%	▼9.32
INC	Kunda Shyamdeo Raut	20,573	10.30%	New
BSP	Bhadant Mahapant	19,450	9.74%	▲4.00
SS	Prakashbhau Jadhao	6,997	3.50%	New
CPI	Kale Shyam	1,711	0.86%	New
RPIE	Dinesh Tarachand Bansod	1,298	0.65%	New
NOTA	None of the above	709	0.36%	New
Margin of victory		23,158	11.60%	▲11.17
Turnout		200,567	66.18%	▲7.60
Total valid votes		199,654		
Registered electors		303,081		▲9.98
BJP hold		Swing	▲1.85	

=== Assembly Election 2009 ===
2009 Maharashtra Legislative Assembly election : Hingna
Party	Candidate	Votes	%	±%
BJP	Ghodmare Vijaybabu Pandurangji	65,039	40.29%	New
NCP	Rameshchandra Gopikisan Bang	64,339	39.86%	New
BSP	Rajaram Gayaprasad Pande	9,262	5.74%	New
Independent	Rajesh Manoranjan Gautam	8,643	5.35%	New
RPI(A)	Dinesh Tarachand Bansod	6,749	4.18%	New
Independent	Singh Udayabhan Laxman Singh	2,659	1.65%	New
GGP	Dilip Mangal Madavi	1,030	0.64%	New
Margin of victory		700	0.43%	▼26.76
Turnout		161,442	58.58%	▲2.25
Total valid votes		161,428		
Registered electors		275,584		▲433.35
BJP gain from INC		Swing	▼4.15	

=== Assembly Election 1952 ===
1952 Hyderabad State Legislative Assembly election : Hingna
Party	Candidate	Votes	%	±%
INC	Mohammed Abdulla Khan Pathan	12,937	44.44%	New
Independent	Rajaram Lakshaman Mahale	5,022	17.25%	New
Socialist	Ramsingh Madhosing Gour	4,731	16.25%	New
Independent	Raghunath Bajirao Nimbalkar	4,655	15.99%	New
KMPP	Murlidhar Laxmanrao Vaidya	600	2.06%	New
SCF	Balkrishna Nagoji Vaidya	590	2.03%	New
ABJS	Kashirao Deoramji Kalnawat	573	1.97%	New
Margin of victory		7,915	27.19%	
Turnout		29,108	56.33%	
Total valid votes		29,108		
Registered electors		51,670		
INC win (new seat)				

== See also ==
- Hingna
