= Kumbhare =

Kumbhare is an Indian surname. Notable people with the surname include:

- Sulekha Kumbhare (born 1962), Indian politician, lawyer, and activist
- Vikas Kumbhare (born 1962), Indian politician
