= Ramtek Lok Sabha constituency =

Lok Sabha constituency in Maharashtra

Coordinates: 21.4°N 79.3°E

Ramtek
- Lok Sabha constituency
- Ramtek Lok Sabha Constituency map

Constituency details
- Country: India
- Region: Western India
- State: Maharashtra
- Assembly constituencies: Katol; Savner; Hingna; Umred; Kamthi; Ramtek
- Established: 1952
- Total electors: 20,49,085 (2024)
- Reservation: SC

Member of Parliament
- 18th Lok Sabha
- Incumbent Shyamkumar Daulat Barve
- Party: Indian National Congress
- Elected year: 2024
- Preceded by: Krupal Balaji Tumane

Ramtek is one of the 48 Lok Sabha (parliamentary) constituencies in the state of Maharashtra in western India. The constituency did not exist during the Indian general elections of 1951-52 for the 1st Lok Sabha. It was created for 1957 Indian general election for the 2nd Lok Sabha, with abolition of the Amravati West constituency in the neighbouring Amravati district.

== Assembly segments ==
Presently, Ramtek Lok Sabha constituency comprises six Vidhan Sabha (legislative assembly) segments. These segments are:

No	Name	District	Member	Party	Leading (in Lok Sabha 2024)
48	Katol	Nagpur	Charansing Thakur	BJP	INC
49	Savner	Nagpur	Dr. Ashish R. Deshmukh	BJP	INC
50	Hingna	Nagpur	Sameer Meghe	BJP	INC
51	Umred (SC)	Nagpur	Sanjay Meshram	INC	INC
58	Kamthi	Nagpur	Chandrashekhar Bawankule	BJP	INC
59	Ramtek	Nagpur	Ashish Jaiswal	SHS	INC

== Members of Parliament ==
Year	Name	Party
1957	Krishnarao Deshmukh	Indian National Congress
1962	Madhavrao Bhagwantrao Patil	Indian National Congress
1967	Amrut Ganpat Sonar	Indian National Congress
1971	Amrut Ganpat Sonar	Indian National Congress
1974^	Ram Hedaoo	Independent politician
1977	Jatiram Barve	Indian National Congress
1980	Jatiram Barve	Indian National Congress
1984	P. V. Narasimha Rao	Indian National Congress
1989	P. V. Narasimha Rao	Indian National Congress
1991	Raje Tejsinghrao Bhonsle	Indian National Congress
1996	Datta Meghe	Indian National Congress
1998	Rani Chitralekha Bhonsle	Indian National Congress
1999	Subodh Mohite Patil	Shiv Sena
2004	Subodh Mohite Patil	Shiv Sena
2007^	Prakash Jadhav	Shiv Sena
2009	Mukul Wasnik	Indian National Congress
2014	Krupal Tumane	Shiv Sena
2019	Krupal Tumane	Shiv Sena
2024	Shyamkumar Barve	Indian National Congress

^ by-poll

== Election results ==
=== General elections 2024 ===
2024 Indian general election: Ramtek
Party	Candidate	Votes	%	±%
INC	Shyamkumar Barve	613,025	48.94	▲9.64
SHS	Raju Devnath Parwe	5,36,257	42.81	▼7.09
BSP	Sandip Sahadeo Meshram	26,098	2.08	▼1.62
Independent	Kishore Uttamrao Gajbhiye	24,383	1.95	N/A
NOTA	None of the above	7,827	0.62	N/A
Majority		76,768	6.13	▼4.47
Turnout		12,52,512	61.13	▼1.17
INC gain from SS		Swing		

=== General elections 2019 ===
2019 Indian general elections: Ramtek
Party	Candidate	Votes	%	±%
SS	Krupal Tumane	594,827	49.90	▲0.42
INC	Kishore Uttamrao Gajbhiye	4,68,738	39.30	▲6.55
BSP	Subhash Dharamdas Gajbhiye	44,327	3.70	▼5.35
VBA	Kiran Rodge	36,218	3.04	New
Majority		1,26,783	10.60	▼6.13
Turnout		11,97,805	62.30	▼0.34
SS hold		Swing		

=== General elections 2014 ===
2014 Indian general elections: Ramtek
Party	Candidate	Votes	%	±%
SS	Krupal Balaji Tumane	519,892	49.48	▲10.92
INC	Mukul Wasnik	3,44,101	32.75	▼7.99
BSP	Kiran Prem Kumar Rodge	95,051	9.05	▲0.92
AAP	Pratap Goswami	25,889	2.46	New
Independent	Goutam Shriram Wasnik	6,353	0.60	N/A
NOTA	None of the Above	4,816	0.46	N/A
Majority		1,75,791	16.73	▲14.55
Turnout		10,50,640	62.64	▲11.76
SS gain from INC		Swing		

=== General elections 2009 ===
2009 Indian general elections: Ramtek
Party	Candidate	Votes	%	±%
INC	Mukul Wasnik	311,614	40.74	▲6.64
SS	Krupal Tumane	2,94,913	38.56	▼3.46
BSP	Prakashbhau Tembhurne	62,238	8.13	N/A
Majority		16,701	2.18	▼2.87
Turnout		7,64,712	50.88	▲
INC gain from SS		Swing		

=== Bye-election 2007 ===
Bye-Election, 2007: Ramtek
Party	Candidate	Votes	%	±%
SS	Prakash Bhagwantrao Jadhav	231,241	42.02	▼6.06
INC	Subodh Baburao Mohite	1,98,669	34.10	▼12.29
Independent	Ranjeet Deshmukh	79,638	14.47	N/A
Independent	Rahul Sukhdeo Telang	15,822	2.87	N/A
Majority		32,572	5.05	▲1.79
Turnout		5,50,284	46.91	▼9.43
SS hold		Swing		

=== General elections 2004 ===
2004 Indian general elections: Ramtek
Party	Candidate	Votes	%	±%
SS	Subodh Mohite	276,598	48.08	▲12.98
INC	Dr. Shrikant Jichkar	2,62,550	46.39	▲12.94
BSP	Prof. Chandansingh Rotele	56,423	19.45	▲17.03
Majority		14,098	3.26	▲1.57
Turnout		6,47,268	56.34	▼9.30
SS hold		Swing		

== See also ==
- Ramtek
- Nagpur district
- Amravati Lok Sabha constituency (for 1951 elections as Amravati West Lok Sabha constituency )
- List of constituencies of the Lok Sabha
