= Ashish Jaiswal =

Indian politician

Minister of State Government of Maharashtra
- Incumbent
- Assumed office 15 December 2024
- Governor: C. P. Radhakrishnan; Acharya Devvrat (additional charge)
- Cabinet: Third Fadnavis ministry
- Chief Minister: Devendra Fadnavis
- Deputy CM: Eknath Shinde; Ajit Pawar (till his demise in 2026) Sunetra Pawar (from 2026)
- Guardian Minister: Gadchiroli

Member of the Maharashtra Legislative Assembly
- In office October 2019 – Incumbent
- Preceded by: Dwaram Mallikarjun Reddy
- Constituency: Ramtek
- In office 1999–2014
- Preceded by: Ashokkumar Gujar
- Succeeded by: Dwaram Mallikarjun Reddy
- Constituency: Ramtek

Chairman of Maharashtra State Mining Corporation
- In office 2018 – November 2024

Personal details
- Born: Incumbent
- Party: Shiv Sena
- Website: ashishjaiswal.org

Ashish Nandkishore Jaiswal is an Indian politician from Shiv Sena and Minister of State for Finance, Planning, Agriculture, Assistance, and Rehabilitation, as well as Law and Justice, in the State of Maharashtra. He is a Member of the Legislative Assembly from Ramtek Vidhan Sabha constituency of Nagpur, Maharashtra. He had been elected for three consecutive terms in the Maharashtra Legislative Assembly in 1999, 2004, 2009, and again in 2019 and 2024.

== Positions held ==
- 1999: Elected to Maharashtra Legislative Assembly (1st term)
- 2004: Re-elected to Maharashtra Legislative Assembly (2nd term)
- 2009: Re-elected to Maharashtra Legislative Assembly (3rd term)
- 2018: Appointed chairman of Maharashtra State Mining Corporation (Marathi: महाराष्ट्र राज्य खनिकर्म महामंडळ)
- 2019: Re-elected to Maharashtra Legislative Assembly (4th term)
- 2024: Re-elected to Maharashtra Legislative Assembly (5th term)

== See also ==
- Ramtek Lok Sabha constituency
