= Tekadi =

- Census town
- Location in Maharashtra, India
- Coordinates: 21.2669°N 79.2248°E
- Country: India
- State: Maharashtra
- District: Nagpur

Population (2001)
  - Total: 17,179

Languages
  - Official: Marathi
- Time zone: UTC+5:30 (IST)

Tekadi is a census town in Nagpur district in the Indian state of Maharashtra.

== Demographics ==
As of 2001 India census, Tekadi had a population of 17,179. Males constitute 53% of the population and females 47%. Tekadi has an average literacy rate of 74%, higher than the national average of 59.5%: male literacy is 80%, and female literacy is 68%. In Tekadi, 11% of the population is under 6 years of age.

Year	Male	Female	Total Population	Change	Religion (%)							
Year	Male	Female	Total Population	Change	Hindu	Muslim	Christian	Sikhs	Buddhist	Jain	Other religions and persuasions	Religion not stated
2001	9144	8036	17180	-	83.411	9.773	0.844	1.438	4.435	0.093	0.000	0.006
2011	7077	6664	13741	-20.017	83.298	9.708	0.808	1.106	4.847	0.044	0.029	0.160

== Notable people ==
- Shyamkumar Barve, politician and Member of Parliament in the 18th Lok Sabha from Ramtek
