= Rajendra Mulak =

Indian politician

Member of Maharashtra Legislative Assembly
- In office 2004–2009
- Preceded by: Vasantrao Itkelwar
- Succeeded by: Sudhir Laxmanrao Parwe
- Constituency: Umred

Member of Maharashtra Legislative Council
- In office 2 January 2010 – 1 January 2016
- Preceded by: Ashok Mankar
- Succeeded by: Girish Vyas
- Constituency: Nagpur Local Authorities constituency

Personal details
- Born: 8 December 1969 (age 56) Nagpur
- Party: Indian National Congress
- Spouse: Late Rajshree Mulak Prerna Mulak (2008)
- Children: Son Yashraj, Abiraj and daughter Tanushree
- Parent: Bhausaheb Mulak
- Occupation: Politician
- Profession: Lawyer

Rajendra Mulak was a Minister of State for Finance & Planning, Energy, Water Resources, Parliamentary Affairs and State Excise in the chief minister Prithviraj Chavan Government of Maharashtra. He has studied Post Graduation in Commerce and has a Degree in Law. Mulak's constituency Umred that he had represented was declared reserved for scheduled caste seat. But he was elected in 2009 as an Maharashtra Legislative Council.

== Personal life ==
Rajendra Mulak was married to Rajashree Mulak, who passed away after a prolonged illness on 16 November 2007.

== Political career ==
Rajendra Mulak was first elected as an Maharashtra Legislative Assembly MLA from the Umred Assembly constituency in 2004.

== Positions held ==
- Minister of State for finance Government of Maharashtra
- MLA from 2004 to 2009 from the Umred constituency
- MLC
