= Yashwantrao Chavan College of Engineering =

Autonomous engineering college under the University of Nagpur, Maharashtra

- Other name: YCCE
- Motto: नवीनं विज्ञानं विजयताम
- Type: Autonomous
- Established: 1984; 42 years ago
- Founder: Datta Meghe
- Parent institution: Nagar Yuwak Shikshan Sanstha
- Accreditation: AICTE, NBA, NAAC
- Affiliations: RTMNU
- Academic affiliations: RTMNU, DTE
- President: Sameer Meghe
- Principal: Uday P. Waghe
- Dean: Dr. Abhay V. Patil
- Academic staff: c. 200
- Students: 5,000
- Undergraduates: Yes
- Postgraduates: Yes
- Doctoral students: Yes
- Other students: Yes
- Location: Wanadongri, Hingna SubDivision, District Nagpur, Maharashtra, 441110, India; 21°5′43.55″N 78°58′42.74″E
- Campus: 14 acres (5.7 ha); Semi-Urban
- Website: www.ycce.edu

Yashwantrao Chavan College of Engineering, often abbreviated as YCCE, is an autonomous engineering college affiliated to RTMNU (formerly, Nagpur University). It is located in town of Hingna in the district of Nagpur. The college was established in 1984 and is named after Yashwantrao Chavan, former first Chief Minister of Maharashtra State and the former Deputy Prime Minister of India; since then, it has been under the administration of Nagar Yuwak Shikshan Sanstha, a subsidiary of Meghe Group. It attained its autonomous status from the University Grants Commission in 2010. The college offers engineering degrees at undergraduate, postgraduate and doctoral level.

== Departments ==
Since the institution was established, eight departments for higher study and research have been created.

Department	Year of establishment	Head of Department
Applied Sciences, Humanities & General Engineering	1984	
Electronics Engineering	1984	Dr. Prasanna Palsodkar
Civil Engineering	1984	Dr. Sanjay P. Raut
Computer Technology	1985	Dr. Mrs. Rakhi D. Wajgi
Electrical Engineering	1987	Dr. Sumant G. Kadwane
Mechanical Engineering	1987	Dr. Jayant P. Giri
Information Technology	2001	Dr. Rajesh C. Dharmik
Electronics & Telecommunication Engineering	2001	Dr. Milind S. Narlawar
Computer Science & Engineering	2020	Lalit B. Damahe
Artificial Intelligence and Data Science	2021	
Computer Science & Design	2021	
CSE (AI&ML)	2022	

=== YASH ===
The institute organizes an annual cultural and technical event known as "YASH". It is a week-long event where various events and competitions take place, such as Freshers Day, Fashion Show-Fashionista, rock concerts, celebrity shows, Ethnic Day and Rose Day, Megheshri .

=== Compufest ===
Compufest is an annual event conducted by the Department of Computer Technology. It is a two-day, techno-cultural event with inter-college and intra-college competitions and workshops.

=== Electrrica ===
Electrrica is the annual technical festival conducted by the Department of Electrical Engineering. It is a two-day event of technical workshops, competitions, seminars, guest lectures and various other related events.

== YCCE-Siemens Center of Excellence for Digital Manufacturing and Robotics ==
Under the guidance and direction of Siemens and AICTE, the YCCE-Siemens Center of Excellence for Digital Manufacturing and Robotics was established. The establishment was inaugurated in December 2013 by Hon. Dr. A.P.J Abdul Kalam, the 11th President of India.

== Notable alumni ==
- Sonu Sood - an Indian actor, film producer, model, humanitarian, and philanthropist who works predominantly in Hindi, Telugu, and Tamil films.
- Shishir Parkhie - A widely acclaimed Indian Ghazal singer, composer and live performer.

== NAAC Grade ==
National Assessment and Accreditation Council (NAAC) Grade - A++ (3.6/4) (highest among engineering colleges in Maharashtra) in 2023.

== NIRF Rankings ==
NIRF rankings

General – India
- NIRF (Universities) (2023): 141

Engineering – India
- NIRF (2024): 151-200

The National Institutional Ranking Framework (NIRF) ranked the college between 151 and 200 in the engineering rankings in 2024.
