= Ramtek Assembly constituency =

Constituency of the Maharashtra legislative assembly in India

Coordinates: 21.39°N 79.33°E

Ramtek
- Constituency No. 59 for the Maharashtra Legislative Assembly

Constituency details
- Country: India
- Region: Western India
- State: Maharashtra
- District: Nagpur
- Lok Sabha constituency: Ramtek
- Established: 1952
- Total electors: 287,301
- Reservation: None

Member of Legislative Assembly
- 15th Maharashtra Legislative Assembly
- Incumbent Ashish Jaiswal
- Party: SHS
- Alliance: NDA
- Elected year: 2024

Ramtek Assembly constituency is one of twelve constituencies of the Maharashtra Vidhan Sabha located in the Nagpur district.

It is a part of the Ramtek Lok Sabha constituency (SC) from Nagpur district along with five other assembly constituencies, viz Katol, Hingna, Umred (SC), Kamthi and Savner Assembly constituency.

== Members of the Legislative Assembly ==
Year	Member	Party
1952	Chintamanrao Govind Tidke; Lalendra Ramchandra Wasnik	Indian National Congress
1957	Narendra Mahipati Tidke	Indian National Congress
1962	Mohammad Abdullakhan Pathan	Indian National Congress
1967	Gunderao Fakiraji Mahajan	Indian National Congress
1972	Gunderao Fakiraji Mahajan	Indian National Congress
1978	Gunderao Fakiraji Mahajan	Indian National Congress
1980	Madhukar Ghanshyamrao Kimmatkar	Indian National Congress
1985	Pandurang Jairamji Hajare	Janata Party
1990	Pandurang Jairamji Hajare	Janata Dal
1991 By-election	Anandrao Deshmukh (Mahajan)	Indian National Congress
1995	Ashokkumar Yeshwant Gujar	Independent politician
1998 By-election	Anandrao Deshmukh (Mahajan)	Indian National Congress
1999	Ashish Nandkishor Jaiswal	Shiv Sena
2004	Ashish Nandkishor Jaiswal	Shiv Sena
2009	Ashish Nandkishor Jaiswal	Shiv Sena
2014	Dwaram Mallikarjun Reddy	Bharatiya Janata Party
2019	Ashish Nandkishor Jaiswal	Independent politician
2024	Ashish Nandkishor Jaiswal	Shiv Sena

== Election results ==
=== Assembly Election 2024 ===
2024 Maharashtra Legislative Assembly election : Ramtek
Party	Candidate	Votes	%	±%
SS	Ashish Nandkishor Jaiswal	107,967	52.18	New
Independent	Rajendra Bhaurao Mulak	81,412	39.35	New
SS(UBT)	Vishal Gangadharrao Barbate	5,501	2.66	New
Independent	Chandrapal Nathusao Choukasey	3,254	1.57	New
BSP	Chandrashekhar Namade Bhimte	2,567	1.24	▼3.93
Independent	Vijay Natthuji Hatwar	1,592	0.77	New
Independent	Sachin Marotrao Kirpan	1,544	0.75	New
NOTA	None of the above	562	0.27	▼0.61
Margin of victory		26,555	12.83	▼0.52
Turnout		207,458	72.21	▲5.93
Total valid votes		206,896		
Registered electors		287,301		▲3.10
SS gain from Independent		Swing	▲15.32	

=== Assembly Election 2019 ===
2019 Maharashtra Legislative Assembly election : Ramtek
Party	Candidate	Votes	%	±%
Independent	Ashish Nandkishor Jaiswal	67,419	36.86	New
BJP	Dwaram Mallikarjun Reddy	43,006	23.51	▼11.68
INC	Udaysingh Sohanlalji Yadav	32,497	17.77	▼3.31
PHJSP	Karamore Ramesh Prabhakar	24,735	13.52	New
BSP	Sanjay Vitthalrao Satyekar	9,464	5.17	▲0.07
VBA	Bhagwan Bhaiyya Bhonde	2,267	1.24	New
NOTA	None of the above	1,617	0.88	▲0.06
Independent	Satyendra (Bunty) Ratanlal Gedam	1,615	0.88	New
Margin of victory		24,413	13.35	▲6.19
Turnout		184,698	66.28	▼2.42
Total valid votes		182,914		
Registered electors		278,654		▲12.59
Independent gain from BJP		Swing	▲1.67	

=== Assembly Election 2014 ===
2014 Maharashtra Legislative Assembly election : Ramtek
Party	Candidate	Votes	%	±%
BJP	Dwaram Mallikarjun Reddy	59,343	35.19	New
SS	Ashish Nandkishor Jaiswal	47,262	28.03	▼4.49
INC	Mohite Subodh Baburao	35,546	21.08	▼9.25
NCP	Dr. Amol Ranjeet Deshmukh	9,162	5.43	New
BSP	Vishesh Vasanta Futane	8,601	5.10	▲0.80
Independent	Sanjay Vitthalrao Satyekar	3,441	2.04	New
MNS	Yogesh Raghunath Wadibhasme	2,343	1.39	New
NOTA	None of the above	1,379	0.82	New
Margin of victory		12,081	7.16	▲4.97
Turnout		170,026	68.70	▲3.76
Total valid votes		168,640		
Registered electors		247,504		▲4.19
BJP gain from SS		Swing	▲2.67	

=== Assembly Election 2009 ===
2009 Maharashtra Legislative Assembly election : Ramtek
Party	Candidate	Votes	%	±%
SS	Ashish Nandkishor Jaiswal	49,937	32.52	▲4.73
INC	Mohite Subodh Baburao	46,576	30.33	▲14.17
GGP	Dwaram Mallikarjun Reddy	34,304	22.34	▲15.96
BSP	Kamley Mahadeo Gangadhar	6,602	4.30	▼3.99
Independent	Mohan Rambhau Mahajan	2,545	1.66	New
Independent	Mungale Jivan Mahadeorao	2,194	1.43	New
CPI(M)	Raju Kawadu Hatwar	1,483	0.97	▼0.18
CPI	(Anna Comrade) Natthu Parteti	1,402	0.91	New
Margin of victory		3,361	2.19	▼6.99
Turnout		154,281	64.94	▼5.15
Total valid votes		153,576		
Registered electors		237,560		▲12.49
SS hold		Swing	▲4.73	

=== Assembly Election 2004 ===
2004 Maharashtra Legislative Assembly election : Ramtek
Party	Candidate	Votes	%	±%
SS	Ashish Nandkishor Jaiswal	41,115	27.79	▼10.91
Independent	Kimmatkar Madhukar Ghanshyamrao	27,539	18.62	New
INC	Choukasey Chandrapal Naththusao	23,904	16.16	▼15.86
Independent	Reddy D. Mallikarjun Ram Reddy	21,291	14.39	New
BSP	Gujar Shivraj Alias (Baba) Vijaykumar	12,264	8.29	▲6.00
GGP	Uikey Dharmuji Mukaji	9,441	6.38	▼1.24
Independent	Rokade Bharat Mahadeorao	4,248	2.87	New
CPI(M)	Hatwar Raju Kawadu	1,705	1.15	New
Margin of victory		13,576	9.18	▲2.49
Turnout		148,013	70.09	▲8.00
Total valid votes		147,931		
Registered electors		211,185		▲13.49
SS hold		Swing	▼10.91	

=== Assembly Election 1999 ===
1999 Maharashtra Legislative Assembly election : Ramtek
Party	Candidate	Votes	%	±%
SS	Ashish Nandkishor Jaiswal	42,350	38.70	▲7.60
INC	Anandrao Deshmukh (Mahajan)	35,035	32.02	▼7.44
NCP	Sadanand Chandrabhanji Nimkar	13,381	12.23	New
GGP	Tekam Wasudeo Zituji	8,340	7.62	New
Independent	Tidke Baburao Madhavrao	6,253	5.71	New
BSP	Khobragade Sundarlal Sitaram	2,505	2.29	▼0.75
Independent	Madavi Balkrishna Mirguji	1,066	0.97	New
Margin of victory		7,315	6.69	▼1.68
Turnout		115,540	62.09	▲19.51
Total valid votes		109,422		
Registered electors		186,089		▼0.51
SS gain from INC		Swing	▼0.76	

=== Assembly By-election 1998 ===
1998 Maharashtra Legislative Assembly by-election : Ramtek
Party	Candidate	Votes	%	±%
INC	Anandrao Deshmukh (Mahajan)	30,922	39.46	▲11.86
SS	Ashish Nandkishor Jaiswal	24,366	31.10	New
Independent	Akre Arun Nandev	10,496	13.39	New
Independent	Gaikwad Wamanrao Sitaram	3,892	4.97	New
Independent	Madavi Balkrishna	3,421	4.37	New
BSP	Dongre Raibhan Shriram	2,384	3.04	▼3.00
Independent	Kamle Mahadeo Gangadhar	1,066	1.36	New
IC(S)	Shende Ramkrishna Vithoba	786	1.00	New
Margin of victory		6,556	8.37	▼0.29
Turnout		79,647	42.58	▼34.93
Total valid votes		78,359		
Registered electors		187,040		▼2.47
INC gain from Independent		Swing	▲3.20	

=== Assembly Election 1995 ===
1995 Maharashtra Legislative Assembly election : Ramtek
Party	Candidate	Votes	%	±%
Independent	Gujar Ashokkumar Yeshwant	52,428	36.26	New
INC	Anandrao Deshmukh (Mahajan)	39,905	27.60	▼20.25
BJP	Pandurang Jairamji Hajare	30,172	20.87	New
BSP	Dr. Dongre Raibhan Shriram	8,731	6.04	▲3.95
Independent	Madavi Balkrushna Mirguji	3,364	2.33	New
JD	Gajbhiye Ishwar Natthuji	2,462	1.70	▼0.52
BBM	Kalra Vijaykumar Remaldas	1,790	1.24	New
Independent	Darode Balachand Dhaniram	1,280	0.89	New
Margin of victory		12,523	8.66	▲6.51
Turnout		148,658	77.51	
Total valid votes		144,601		
Registered electors		191,782		
Independent gain from INC		Swing	▼11.59	

=== Assembly By-election 1991 ===
1991 Maharashtra Legislative Assembly by-election : Ramtek
Party	Candidate	Votes	%	±%
INC	A. R. Deshmukh (Mahajan)	44,812	47.85	▲16.23
Independent	G. A. K. Y. Rao	42,798	45.70	New
JD	D. Wakundkar	2,077	2.22	▼37.61
BSP	A. S. Rambhau	1,957	2.09	▲0.68
Independent	R. (Mama)raghuwanshi	1,083	1.16	New
Margin of victory		2,014	2.15	▼6.05
Total valid votes		93,642		
INC gain from JD		Swing	▲8.02	

=== Assembly Election 1990 ===
1990 Maharashtra Legislative Assembly election : Ramtek
Party	Candidate	Votes	%	±%
JD	Pandurang Jairamji Hajare	43,482	39.83	New
INC	Kimmatkar Madhukar Ghanshyamrao	34,525	31.62	▼10.61
Independent	Narendra Tukaram Kodwate	9,738	8.92	New
SS	Prakash Bhau Jadhao	9,597	8.79	New
Independent	Daulat Raoji Dhoke	4,600	4.21	New
BSP	Bhau Shankarrao Maraskolhe	1,544	1.41	New
Independent	Ratiram (Mama) Raghuwanshi	1,453	1.33	New
Independent	Suresh Deorao Gayakawad	1,374	1.26	New
Margin of victory		8,957	8.20	▲2.02
Turnout		110,935	64.67	▲0.48
Total valid votes		109,177		
Registered electors		171,537		▲26.34
JD gain from JP		Swing	▼8.57	

=== Assembly Election 1985 ===
1985 Maharashtra Legislative Assembly election : Ramtek
Party	Candidate	Votes	%	±%
JP	Pandurang Jairamji Hajare	41,445	48.40	New
INC	Kimmatkar Madhukar Ghanshyamrao	36,157	42.23	New
RPI(K)	Gajbhiya Chaitram Pithuji	3,543	4.14	New
Independent	Madhukar Zadbaji Kumbre	1,754	2.05	New
Independent	Kannu Narayan Shingumare	1,027	1.20	New
Independent	Madhukar Wanwasji Meshram	726	0.85	New
Margin of victory		5,288	6.18	▼1.78
Turnout		87,157	64.19	▲15.37
Total valid votes		85,624		
Registered electors		135,771		▲14.08
JP gain from INC(I)		Swing	▼1.17	

=== Assembly Election 1980 ===
1980 Maharashtra Legislative Assembly election : Ramtek
Party	Candidate	Votes	%	±%
INC(I)	Kimmatkar Madhukar Ghanshyamrao	28,140	49.57	▲10.71
JP	Pandurang Jairamji Hajare	23,621	41.61	New
Independent	Mohanlal Pokhardas Sapra	2,563	4.51	New
INC(U)	Masram Vinodini Indrarajsinh	2,448	4.31	New
Margin of victory		4,519	7.96	▲0.90
Turnout		58,107	48.82	▼19.69
Total valid votes		56,772		
Registered electors		119,016		▲7.80
INC(I) hold		Swing	▲10.71	

=== Assembly Election 1978 ===
1978 Maharashtra Legislative Assembly election : Ramtek
Party	Candidate	Votes	%	±%
INC(I)	Gunderao Fakiraji Mahajan	28,535	38.86	New
JP	Pandurang Jairamji Hajare	23,350	31.80	New
INC	Deshmukh Anandrao Ramji	10,254	13.96	▼23.30
Independent	Tekam Wasudeo Zitu	6,201	8.44	New
CPI	Isabhal Ismail	4,088	5.57	New
Independent	Jambhulhar Kisan Hanuji	1,010	1.38	New
Margin of victory		5,185	7.06	▼1.39
Turnout		75,636	68.51	▲13.12
Total valid votes		73,438		
Registered electors		110,401		▲25.64
INC(I) gain from INC		Swing	▲1.60	

=== Assembly Election 1972 ===
1972 Maharashtra Legislative Assembly election : Ramtek
Party	Candidate	Votes	%	±%
INC	Gunderao Fakiraji Mahajan	17,424	37.26	▼7.44
AIFB	Pandurang Jairamji Hajare	13,470	28.80	New
RPI(K)	Bawankule Wivalu Budha	6,932	14.82	New
ABJS	S. Vishwanath Selokar	3,761	8.04	▼1.74
RPI	Narayan Motiram Gedam	1,856	3.97	▼14.72
Independent	Vishwanath Bhoyar	1,542	3.30	New
INC(O)	Vasantrao Bhagwan Dharmik	1,432	3.06	New
Independent	Laxman Bhagadkar	351	0.75	New
Margin of victory		3,954	8.45	▼17.56
Turnout		48,670	55.39	▲3.67
Total valid votes		46,768		
Registered electors		87,870		▲11.36
INC hold		Swing	▼7.44	

=== Assembly Election 1967 ===
1967 Maharashtra Legislative Assembly election : Ramtek
Party	Candidate	Votes	%	±%
INC	Gunderao Fakiraji Mahajan	16,905	44.70	▲10.05
RPI	M. M. Borkar	7,068	18.69	New
Independent	Pandurang Jairamji Hajare	6,294	16.64	New
ABJS	G. D. Ambagade	3,700	9.78	New
Independent	N. T. Shaireya	2,391	6.32	New
Independent	S. U. Deotale	1,462	3.87	New
Margin of victory		9,837	26.01	▲15.60
Turnout		40,808	51.72	▼1.17
Total valid votes		37,820		
Registered electors		78,903		▲10.69
INC hold		Swing	▲10.05	

=== Assembly Election 1962 ===
1962 Maharashtra Legislative Assembly election : Ramtek
Party	Candidate	Votes	%	±%
INC	Pathan Mohammad Abdullakhan	11,840	34.65	▼23.73
Independent	Vishnu Mahadeo Dhoble	8,283	24.24	New
RPI	Chaitram Pithuji Gajbhiye	6,606	19.33	New
ABJS	Sadashiv Raghunath Pande	3,471	10.16	New
Independent	Dipchand Manikchand Gore	2,059	6.03	New
Independent	Chaitu Naru Uhika	1,910	5.59	New
Margin of victory		3,557	10.41	▼30.98
Turnout		37,704	52.89	▲8.76
Total valid votes		34,169		
Registered electors		71,286		▲12.30
INC hold		Swing	▼23.73	

=== Assembly Election 1957 ===
1957 Bombay State Legislative Assembly election : Ramtek
Party	Candidate	Votes	%	±%
INC	Tidke Narendra Mahipati	16,355	58.38	▲12.19
PSP	Bisan Bhimsingh Babusingh	4,760	16.99	New
ABJS	Pande Sadashio Raghunath	3,949	14.10	▲5.01
Independent	Thakur Govind Jagoba	2,274	8.12	New
Independent	Sant Govind Balkrishna	675	2.41	New
Margin of victory		11,595	41.39	▲39.26
Turnout		28,013	44.13	▼56.68
Total valid votes		28,013		
Registered electors		63,478		▼35.65
INC hold		Swing	▲34.22	

=== Assembly Election 1952 ===
1952 Hyderabad State Legislative Assembly election : Ramtek
Party	Candidate	Votes	%	±%
INC	Chintamanrao Govind Tidke	24,026	24.16	New
INC	Lalendra Ramchandra Wasnik	21,907	22.03	New
SCF	Narayan Hari Kumbhare	9,641	9.70	New
Socialist	Bhimsingh Babusingh Bisen	9,444	9.50	New
Independent	Shankarrao Gangaramji Katkamwar	5,765	5.80	New
ABJS	Deochand Gujaba Harode	4,855	4.88	New
KMPP	Dravind Alias Dwarkanath Hansraj	4,562	4.59	New
KMPP	Champtrao Dongre	4,226	4.25	New
ABJS	Kapurchand Gangaram Motghare	4,185	4.21	New
Independent	Marotrao Nagorao Varkhade	3,264	3.28	New
Margin of victory		2,119	2.13	
Turnout		99,441	100.81	
Total valid votes		99,441		
Registered electors		98,642		
INC win (new seat)				

== See also ==
- Mouda
- Parseoni
- Ramtek
- Ramtek Lok Sabha constituency
