= Pravin Vasantrao Tayade =

Indian politician

Member of the Maharashtra Legislative Assembly
- Incumbent
- Assumed office 23 November 2024
- Preceded by: Bachchu Kadu
- Constituency: Achalpur

Personal details
- Political party: Bharatiya Janata Party
- Profession: Politician

Pravin Vasantrao Tayade is an Indian politician from Maharashtra. He is a member of the Maharashtra Legislative Assembly from 2024, representing Achalpur Assembly constituency as a member of the Bharatiya Janata Party.

He shot to limelight as he defeated four time MLA & Former Minister, Bachchu Kadu.

== Political career ==
Pravin Tayade is a member of the Rashtriya Swayamsevak Sangh (RSS), a far-right Hindu nationalist paramilitary volunteer organisation.

== See also ==
- List of chief ministers of Maharashtra
- Maharashtra Legislative Assembly
