= Umred Assembly constituency =

Constituency of the Maharashtra legislative assembly in India

Coordinates: 20.85°N 79.32°E

Umred
- Constituency No. 51 for the Maharashtra Legislative Assembly

Constituency details
- Country: India
- Region: Western India
- State: Maharashtra
- District: Nagpur
- Lok Sabha constituency: Ramtek
- Established: 1951
- Total electors: 301,080
- Reservation: SC

Member of Legislative Assembly
- 15th Maharashtra Legislative Assembly
- Incumbent Sanjay Meshram
- Party: INC
- Alliance: MVA
- Elected year: 2024

Umred Assembly constituency, formerly known as Umrer, is one of twelve constituencies of the Maharashtra Vidhan Sabha located in Nagpur district.

It is a part of Ramtek Lok Sabha constituency (SC).

On 24 March 2024, Umred Assembly constituency became vacant as the incumbent MLA Raju Parwe resigned as Member Of Umred Legislative Assembly and Primary Member of Indian National Congress (INC).

== Members of the Legislative Assembly ==
Year	Member	Party
1952	Ramchandra Pandurang Lanjewar	Indian National Congress
1957	Chaudhari Anantram Dayal (SC); Samrath Sadashiorao Rajaramrao	Indian National Congress
1962	Damu Sadashiv Tarnekar	Indian National Congress
1967	Sureshbabu Baliramji Deotale	Indian National Congress
1972	A. L. Waghmare	Indian National Congress
1978	Dakate Purushottam Mansaram	Indian National Congress
1980	Mulak Bhausaheb Govindrao	Indian National Congress
1985	Parate Shrawan Govindrao	Indian Congress
1990	Parate Shrawan Govindrao	Indian National Congress
1995	Parate Shrawan Govindrao	Indian National Congress
1999	Vasantrao Balaji Itkelwar	Independent politician
2004	Rajendra Mulak	Indian National Congress
2009	Sudhir Parwe	Bharatiya Janata Party
2014	Sudhir Parwe	Bharatiya Janata Party
2019	Raju Parwe	Indian National Congress
2024	Sanjay Meshram	Indian National Congress

== Election results ==
=== Assembly Election 2024 ===
2024 Maharashtra Legislative Assembly election : Umred
Party	Candidate	Votes	%	±%
INC	Sanjay Meshram	85,372	39.78%	▼7.16
BJP	Sudhir Laxman Parwe	72,547	33.80%	▼3.94
Independent	Gharde Pramod Deorao	49,262	22.95%	New
BSP	Bhimrao Suryabhan Gajbhiye	3,379	1.57%	▼7.91
VBA	Sapna Rajendra Meshram	1,854	0.86%	▼2.17
NOTA	None of the above	1,263	0.59%	▼0.29
Margin of victory		12,825	5.98%	▼3.22
Turnout		215,887	71.70%	▲1.96
Total valid votes		214,624		
Registered electors		301,080		▲5.73
INC hold		Swing	▼7.16	

=== Assembly Election 2019 ===
2019 Maharashtra Legislative Assembly election : Umred
Party	Candidate	Votes	%	±%
INC	Raju Parwe	91,968	46.94%	▲37.50
BJP	Sudhir Laxman Parwe	73,939	37.74%	▼11.88
BSP	Sandip Sahadeo Meshram	18,567	9.48%	▼8.82
VBA	Rukshdas Mokasrao Bansod	5,931	3.03%	New
MNS	Manojkumar Manoranjan Bawangade	1,790	0.91%	▼0.27
NOTA	None of the above	1,724	0.88%	▲0.15
Margin of victory		18,029	9.20%	▼22.12
Turnout		198,597	69.74%	▲3.65
Total valid votes		195,934		
Registered electors		284,768		▲0.26
INC gain from BJP		Swing	▼2.68	

=== Assembly Election 2014 ===
2014 Maharashtra Legislative Assembly election : Umred
Party	Candidate	Votes	%	±%
BJP	Sudhir Parwe	92,399	49.62%	▲0.59
BSP	Bansod Rukshadas Mokasrao	34,077	18.30%	▲11.27
Independent	Raju Deonath Parwe	23,497	12.62%	New
INC	Meshram Sanjay Narayanrao	17,586	9.44%	▼13.93
SS	Abhyankar Jagannath Motiram	7,180	3.86%	New
NCP	Fule Ramesh Baburao	2,747	1.48%	New
MNS	Kambale Rajesh Digambar	2,201	1.18%	New
NOTA	None of the above	1,352	0.73%	New
Margin of victory		58,322	31.32%	▲5.66
Turnout		187,712	66.09%	▲3.10
Total valid votes		186,209		
Registered electors		284,020		▲2.39
BJP hold		Swing	▲0.59	

=== Assembly Election 2009 ===
2009 Maharashtra Legislative Assembly election : Umred
Party	Candidate	Votes	%	±%
BJP	Sudhir Parwe	85,416	49.03%	▲19.08
INC	Meshram Shrirish Mahadeorao	40,720	23.37%	▼24.57
Independent	Sandip Gawai	15,943	9.15%	New
BSP	Vinod Bhaskarrao Patil	12,246	7.03%	▼0.94
Independent	Bansod Rukshadas Mokasrao	5,281	3.03%	New
Independent	Dharmadas Mirguji Chaudhari	3,131	1.80%	New
Independent	Malke Ghanshyam Ramaji	2,647	1.52%	New
Democratic Secular Party	Golghate Tarkeshwar Devidas	1,591	0.91%	New
Margin of victory		44,696	25.66%	▲7.67
Turnout		174,711	62.99%	▼10.72
Total valid votes		174,218		
Registered electors		277,378		▲47.29
BJP gain from INC		Swing	▲1.09	

=== Assembly Election 2004 ===
2004 Maharashtra Legislative Assembly election : Umred
Party	Candidate	Votes	%	±%
INC	Rajendra Mulak	66,539	47.94%	▲28.52
BJP	Vitthalrao Jagobaji Raut Patil	41,573	29.95%	▲3.34
BSP	Bele Krushna Narayan	11,057	7.97%	▲4.30
Independent	Itkelwar Vasantrao Balaji	6,668	4.80%	New
Independent	Wagdhare Takshashila Kamalnath	5,784	4.17%	New
AIFB	Dayaram Bhagwan Narnaware	1,651	1.19%	New
Independent	Bure Devrao Madhoji	1,538	1.11%	New
GGP	Kursange Ashok Mukunda	1,319	0.95%	▼0.02
Margin of victory		24,966	17.99%	▲9.66
Turnout		138,803	73.71%	▲4.81
Total valid votes		138,791		
Registered electors		188,321		▲12.76
INC gain from Independent		Swing	▲13.00	

=== Assembly Election 1999 ===
1999 Maharashtra Legislative Assembly election : Umred
Party	Candidate	Votes	%	±%
Independent	Vasantrao Balaji Itkelwar	37,950	34.94%	New
BJP	Raut Vitthalrao Jagobaji (Patil)	28,899	26.61%	▲17.16
INC	Mulak Rajendra Bhausaheb	21,089	19.42%	▼5.45
NCP	Dr. Shrawan Govindrao Parate	12,535	11.54%	New
BSP	Sheikh Zebunnisa Mohammed Nazir	3,983	3.67%	▼13.54
Independent	Bure Deoram Madhorao	1,743	1.60%	New
GGP	Kumbhare Vishnukant Suryakant	1,056	0.97%	New
Margin of victory		9,051	8.33%	▲5.95
Turnout		115,067	68.90%	▼14.78
Total valid votes		108,600		
Registered electors		167,007		▼0.23
Independent gain from INC		Swing	▲10.07	

=== Assembly Election 1995 ===
1995 Maharashtra Legislative Assembly election : Umred
Party	Candidate	Votes	%	±%
INC	Parate Shrawan Govindrao	33,930	24.87%	▼4.50
Independent	Itkelwar Vasantrao Balajipant	30,686	22.49%	New
BSP	Mehsram Nathu Hari	23,478	17.21%	New
BJP	Raut Vithalrao Jagbasi	12,891	9.45%	New
Independent	Itankar Deorao Shrawanji	10,525	7.71%	New
Independent	Deorao Madho Bure	5,950	4.36%	New
Independent	Gode Keshaorao Panduranji	4,179	3.06%	New
Independent	Shirshikar Raju Yogshwar	4,102	3.01%	New
Margin of victory		3,244	2.38%	▼3.99
Turnout		140,078	83.68%	▲17.77
Total valid votes		136,438		
Registered electors		167,395		▲7.94
INC hold		Swing	▼4.50	

=== Assembly Election 1990 ===
1990 Maharashtra Legislative Assembly election : Umred
Party	Candidate	Votes	%	±%
INC	Parate Sharwan Govindrao	29,555	29.37%	▼8.34
Independent	Itkelwar Vasantrao Balaji	23,146	23.00%	New
RPI(K)	Meshra Nattu Hari	20,343	20.22%	New
JD	Gode Keshorao Pandurang	13,260	13.18%	New
Independent	Samarth Chandrashekhar Tukaramji	6,375	6.33%	New
SS	Traymbakrao (Dinkar) Marotrao Chakole	5,135	5.10%	New
Independent	Namdeo Sharwan Bele	710	0.71%	New
Margin of victory		6,409	6.37%	▼11.56
Turnout		102,213	65.91%	▲0.22
Total valid votes		100,632		
Registered electors		155,082		▲23.31
INC gain from IC(S)		Swing	▼26.27	

=== Assembly Election 1985 ===
1985 Maharashtra Legislative Assembly election : Umred
Party	Candidate	Votes	%	±%
IC(S)	Parate Shrawan Govindrao	45,223	55.64%	New
INC	Bhausaheb Govindrao Mulak	30,650	37.71%	New
RPI	Harishchandra Mangoji Meshram	2,817	3.47%	New
Independent	Bakde Ambadas Gopalrao	1,573	1.94%	New
Independent	Mandpe Nilkanth Hilku	595	0.73%	New
Margin of victory		14,573	17.93%	▲1.06
Turnout		82,616	65.69%	▲16.83
Total valid votes		81,275		
Registered electors		125,769		▲6.84
IC(S) gain from INC(I)		Swing	▲16.01	

=== Assembly Election 1980 ===
1980 Maharashtra Legislative Assembly election : Umred
Party	Candidate	Votes	%	±%
INC(I)	Mulak Bhausaheb Govindrao	22,145	39.63%	▼16.36
INC(U)	Itankar Deorao Shrawan	12,715	22.75%	New
Independent	Dekate Purushottam Mansaram	9,356	16.74%	New
Independent	Walke Chintaman Janba	7,953	14.23%	New
BJP	Dubey Shambabu Gangaprasad	1,896	3.39%	New
Independent	Paunikar Pandurang Pundlik	1,107	1.98%	New
Independent	Bokade Eknath Govinda	713	1.28%	New
Margin of victory		9,430	16.87%	▼22.87
Turnout		57,520	48.86%	▼21.24
Total valid votes		55,885		
Registered electors		117,721		▲3.45
INC(I) hold		Swing	▼16.36	

=== Assembly Election 1978 ===
1978 Maharashtra Legislative Assembly election : Umred
Party	Candidate	Votes	%	±%
INC(I)	Dakate Purushottam Mansaram	43,171	55.99%	New
Independent	Darne Shrawan Domaji	12,527	16.25%	New
RPI(K)	Bante Shankarrao Haribhau	10,722	13.90%	▲5.70
Independent	Waghmare Adkuji Laluji	4,611	5.98%	New
INC	Tarnekar Damuji Sadashio	2,964	3.84%	▼47.78
Independent	Zodape Mukundrao Narayan	1,206	1.56%	New
Independent	Deshmukh Dayaram Rawaji	1,188	1.54%	New
Independent	Masram Indrarajsingh Chandansingh	558	0.72%	New
Margin of victory		30,644	39.74%	▲21.35
Turnout		79,772	70.10%	▲12.94
Total valid votes		77,110		
Registered electors		113,791		▲13.42
INC(I) gain from INC		Swing	▲4.37	

=== Assembly Election 1972 ===
1972 Maharashtra Legislative Assembly election : Umred
Party	Candidate	Votes	%	±%
INC	A. L. Waghmare	28,533	51.62%	▲10.70
Independent	Shrwan Doma Darne	18,368	33.23%	New
RPI(K)	Rajaramji Laxman Mahale	4,530	8.20%	New
RPI	Shaligram Dashrath Patil	3,846	6.96%	New
Margin of victory		10,165	18.39%	▲1.68
Turnout		57,346	57.16%	▼3.02
Total valid votes		55,277		
Registered electors		100,324		▲14.43
INC hold		Swing	▲10.70	

=== Assembly Election 1967 ===
1967 Maharashtra Legislative Assembly election : Umred
Party	Candidate	Votes	%	±%
INC	S. B. Deotale	19,732	40.92%	▲8.19
Independent	K. S. Meskar	11,673	24.21%	New
Independent	R. L. Mahale	9,805	20.33%	New
Independent	N. H. Heshram	2,360	4.89%	New
ABJS	G. N. Najpande	1,748	3.63%	New
Independent	B. B. Wankhede	1,697	3.52%	New
Independent	J. T. Bais	474	0.98%	New
Margin of victory		8,059	16.71%	▲2.01
Turnout		52,761	60.18%	▲4.54
Total valid votes		48,220		
Registered electors		87,675		▲6.29
INC hold		Swing	▲8.19	

=== Assembly Election 1962 ===
1962 Maharashtra Legislative Assembly election : Umred
Party	Candidate	Votes	%	±%
INC	Damu Sadashiv Tarnekar	13,428	32.73%	▼13.94
Independent	Rajaram Laxman Mahale	7,398	18.03%	New
Independent	Liladharsingh Durgasingh Suryavanshi	7,171	17.48%	New
PSP	Shamrao Nathuji Kakirwar	5,672	13.82%	▼8.11
Independent	Goverdhansingh Sheolalsingh Bhadoria	3,667	8.94%	New
ABJS	Mahadeo Khanduji Lokhare	2,258	5.50%	New
Independent	Radas Chaituji Dudhpachare	1,438	3.50%	New
Margin of victory		6,030	14.70%	▲7.03
Turnout		45,893	55.64%	▼39.05
Total valid votes		41,032		
Registered electors		82,485		▼39.68
INC hold		Swing	▲8.19	

=== Assembly Election 1957 ===
1957 Bombay State Legislative Assembly election : Umrer
Party	Candidate	Votes	%	±%
INC	Chaudhari Anantram Dayal	31,781	24.54%	▼21.15
INC	Samrath Sadashiorao Rajaramrao	28,654	22.13%	▼23.56
SCF	Kumbhare Narayan Hari	21,852	16.88%	New
SCF	Athe Tulsiram Amrut	18,801	14.52%	New
PSP	Mahale Rajaram Laxmanrao	14,741	11.38%	New
PSP	Wasnik Premnath Rushi	13,659	10.55%	New
Margin of victory		9,929	7.67%	▼17.10
Turnout		129,488	94.69%	▲43.16
Total valid votes		129,488		
Registered electors		136,748		▲182.74
INC hold		Swing	▼21.15	

=== Assembly Election 1952 ===
1952 Hyderabad State Legislative Assembly election : Umrer
Party	Candidate	Votes	%	±%
INC	Ramchandra Pandurang Lanjewar	11,386	45.69%	New
Socialist	Murlidhar Ramchandra Kalbandhe	5,214	20.92%	New
KMPP	Amrit Harbaji Kotharkar	2,628	10.54%	New
Independent	Kothiram Gana Gajbhiye	1,537	6.17%	New
ABJS	Somaji Ramaji Bawne	1,211	4.86%	New
Independent	Tejsinharao Abasaheb Venkat Gujar	1,177	4.72%	New
Independent	Sadashiv Mahadeo Raghushe	654	2.62%	New
Independent	Krishnaji Nikhantha Dalal	588	2.36%	New
Independent	Hari Maroti Dudhpachare	527	2.11%	New
Margin of victory		6,172	24.77%	
Turnout		24,922	51.53%	
Total valid votes		24,922		
Registered electors		48,366		
INC win (new seat)				

== See also ==
- Umred
