= Rajesh Shriramji Wankhade =

Indian politician

Member of the Maharashtra Legislative Assembly
- Incumbent
- Assumed office 2024
- Preceded by: Yashomati Chandrakant Thakur
- Constituency: Teosa

Personal details
- Party: Bharatiya Janata Party (2024-Present)
- Other political affiliations: Shiv Sena (Till 2024)
- Profession: Politician

Rajesh Shriramji Wankhade is an Indian politician from Maharashtra. He is a member of the Maharashtra Legislative Assembly from 2024, representing Teosa Assembly constituency as a member of the Bharatiya Janata Party.

== Political career ==
Rajesh Wankhade is a member of the Rashtriya Swayamsevak Sangh (RSS), a far-right Hindu nationalist paramilitary volunteer organisation.

== See also ==
- List of chief ministers of Maharashtra
- Maharashtra Legislative Assembly
