= Narsingrao Sheshrao Deshmukh =

Indian politician

Member of Maharashtra Legislative Assembly
- In office 1967–1978
- Preceded by: Annasaheb Sadashivrao Watene
- Succeeded by: Waman Rajirao Bhokare
- Constituency: Achalpur

Personal details
- Party: Indian National Congress
- Parent: Sheshrao Deshmukh (father)

Narsingrao Sheshrao Deshmukh is a politician and a member of the Indian National Congress, and son of Sheshrao Deshmukh. He was a two-time member of the Maharashtra Legislative Assembly from the Achalpur constituency.
