= Bachchu Kadu =

Indian politician

Bachchu Bhau Kadu
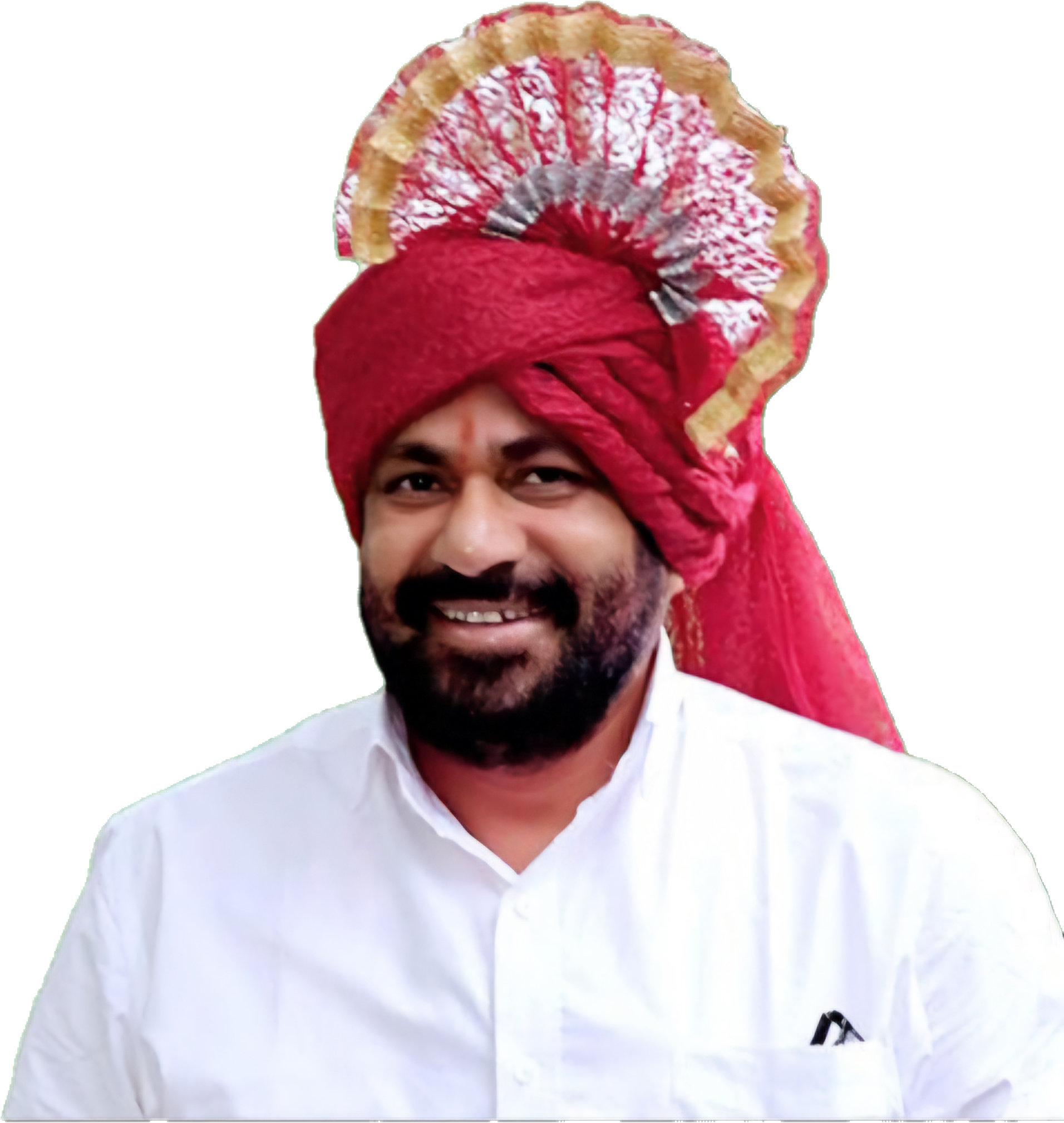

Member of Maharashtra Legislative Council
- Incumbent
- Assumed office 14 May 2026
- Constituency: Elected by MLAs

Member of Maharashtra Legislative Assembly
- In office 13 October 2004 – 26 November 2024
- Preceded by: Vasudhatai Pundlikrao Deshmukh
- Succeeded by: Pravin Tayade
- Constituency: Achalpur

President of Divyang Mantralaya (Cabinet Minister Status) Disability Welfare Ministry of Maharashtra
- In office 25 May 2023 – 4 January 2025

Minister of State Government of Maharashtra
- In office 30 December 2019 – 27 June 2022
- Minister: Water Resources.; Command Area Development.; School Education; Woman and Child Development.; Other Backward Classes; Other Backward Bahujan Welfare; Socially and Educationally Backward Classes; Vimukta Jati; Nomadic Tribes; Special Backward Classes Welfare; Majority Welfare Development; Labour
- Governor: Bhagat Singh Koshyari
- Chief Minister: Uddhav Thackeray
- Deputy CM: Ajit Pawar
- Guardian Minister: Akola District

Personal details
- Born: 5 July 1970 (age 56) Amravati District, Maharashtra
- Party: Shiv Sena (until 1999, since 2026)
- Other political affiliations: Prahar Janshakti Party (1999–2026)
- Spouse: Smt. Nayana Tai Kadu

Omprakash Babarao "Bachchu" Kadu (born 5 July 1970) is a member of the Shiv Sena and founder of the former Prahar Janshakti Party and also a former Member of the Legislative Assembly from Achalpur, Maharashtra, India. Achalpur assembly constituency is a part of Amravati (Lok Sabha constituency). He was elected to the Maharashtra Legislative Assembly for four consecutive terms from 2004 to 2024, before losing in the 2024 election. He was President of Divyang Mantralaya (Ministry) Maharashtra State (Cabinet Minister Rank).

== Career ==
On 19 October 2014, Kadu won the assembly election, defeating congress candidate Bablu Deshmukh by more than 10000 votes. This was the first time in Achalpur assembly elections that a candidate won three times in succession. In 2019, he won the assembly election by a total of 81,252 votes which is 44% of the total votes polled. In the 2024 election he lost to BJP candidate by 12,131 votes. He is the first candidate to be elected for a fourth consecutive term in Achalpur Assembly elections. He is a leader of Prahar Janshakti Party. He is part of the newly formed MahaVikas Aaghadi or MVA, the banner called Prahar Yuvashakti Sanghatana that became the Prahar Party. He then rebelled against MVA along with Eknath Shinde in 2022 Maharashtra political crisis.

In March 2023, he sparked controversy when he said stray dogs should be sent to Assam to be eaten for dog meat.

On 22 April 2017, Punjab Bharatiya Janata Party MP Hema Malini said she would take action against Kadu for making derogatory comments towards her days earlier.

In the 2024 Lok sabha elections Bacchu Kadu's Prahaar Janshakti Party has given a candidate from Amravati Constituency. This move was taken as a response for BJP announcing candidature of controversial candidate Navneet Rana.

In 2026, his party was merged into Shiv Sena

== Positions held ==
- 1997: Elected as member of Panchayat Samiti
- Later in 1997: Elected as Chandurbazar Panchayat Samiti
- 1999: Founded Prahar Janshakti Party party for Farmers development of Maharashtra.
- 2004: Elected to Maharashtra Legislative Assembly (1st term)
- 2009: Re-elected to Maharashtra Legislative Assembly (2nd term)
- 2014: Re-elected to Maharashtra Legislative Assembly (3rd term)
- 2019: Re-elected to Maharashtra Legislative Assembly (4th term)
- Later in 2019: Swear in as minister of state in Uddhav Thackeray Government.
- 2019: Appointed minister of state for Water Resources (Irrigation) & Command Area Development, School Education, Woman & Child Development, Labour, OBC-SEBC-SBC-VJNT Welfare
- 2020: Appointed guardian minister of Akola district
- 2022: Appointment as President of Divyang Mantralaya (Cabinet Minister) Rank Status of Maharashtra from 25 May 2023 till 26 November 2024.
- 2024: Lost the election from Achalpur Assembly constituency by big margin of 12,131 votes.
- 2026: He Joined Shiv Sena on 30th April 2026 again after 27 years in the presence of Deputy Chief Minister of Maharashtra and Shiv Sena leader Eknath Shinde and Cabinet minister of Maharashtra government Uday Samant.

== See also ==
- Uddhav Thackeray ministry
