= Krupal Tumane =

Member, Parliament of India

Member of Maharashtra Legislative Council
- Incumbent
- Assumed office 28 July 2024
- Governor: C. P. Radhakrishnan
- Chairman of Council: Neelam Gorhe (Additional Charge); Ram Shinde
- Constituency: Elected by MLAs

Member of Parliament, Lok Sabha
- In office 2014–2024
- Preceded by: Mukul Wasnik
- Succeeded by: Shyamkumar (Bablu) Barve
- Constituency: Ramtek

Personal details
- Born: 1 June 1965 (age 60)
- Party: Shiv Sena
- Spouse: Revati Tumane
- Occupation: Politician

Krupal Balaji Tumane is an Indian politician from Nagpur, Member of Maharashtra Legislative Council and former Member Of Parliament (Lok Sabha) till 2024 who was re-elected in 17th Lok Sabha & was member of the 16th Lok Sabha of India. He represented the Ramtek constituency of Nagpur district, Maharashtra and is a member of the Shiv Sena political party. In 2014, he defeated sitting MP and former Cabinet Minister Mukul Wasnik of Indian National Congress Party.

== Positions held ==
- 2024: Elected to Maharashtra Vidhan Parishad
- 2019: Re-Elected to 17th Lok Sabha
- 2014: Elected to 16th Lok Sabha
- 14 Aug. 2014 onwards Member, Committee on Welfare of Scheduled Castes and Scheduled Tribes
- 1 Sep. 2014 onwards Member, Standing Committee on Coal and Steel
- 3 Sep. 2014 onwards Member, Consultative Committee, Ministry of Petroleum and Natural Gas
