= Shishir Parkhie =

Indian ghazal singer

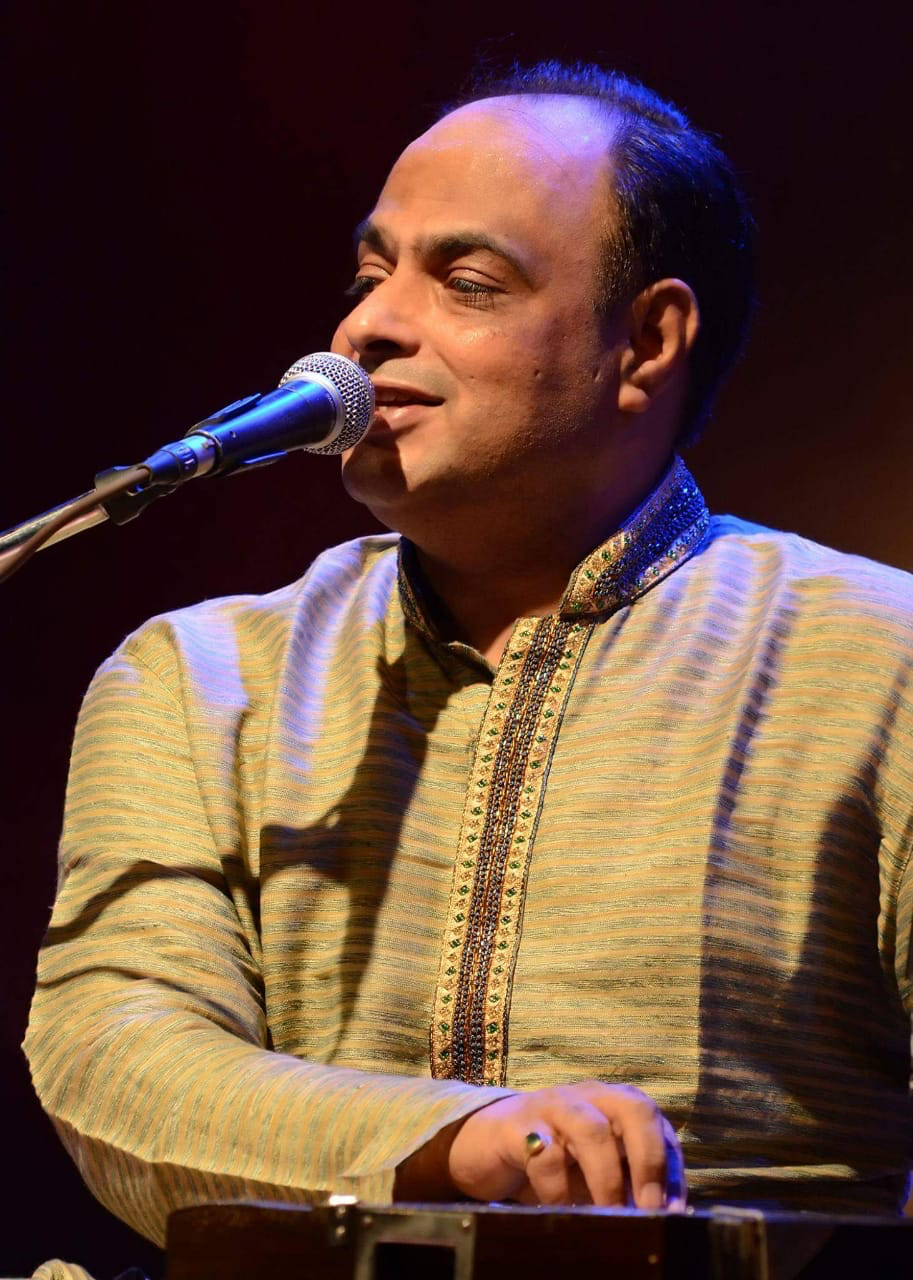
- Shishir Parkhie

Background information
- Born: 7 November 1967 (age 58); Nagpur, Maharashtra, India
- Genres: Ghazal, devotional, Bhajan, music of Bollywood
- Occupations: Singer, composer
- Instruments: Harmonium, Tabla
- Years active: 1989–present
- Labels: Saregama; Times Music; T-Series
- Website: shishirparkhie.in

Shishir Parkhie (born 7 November 1967) is an Indian ghazal singer and composer from Nagpur, Maharashtra. He has been nominated twice for the Global Indian Music Academy Awards in the Best Ghazal Album category.

Parkhie has performed across India and internationally, and has released multiple ghazal albums under labels including T-Series, Saregama and Times Music.

== Early life ==
Shishir Parkhie was born into a musical family and began learning music at an early age under the guidance of his mother, Pratima Parkhie, a Sugam Sangeet artist associated with All India Radio, Ranchi. His father, Sharad Raghunath Parkhie, served as Deputy Chief Architect in Bokaro.

He started singing at the age of six and received training in tabla under Kedarnath Thakur. During his early years, he participated in music competitions and performed at local events. At the age of 15, he presented his first solo ghazal concert in Bokaro. In 1979, he performed in programmes associated with the International Year of the Child organized by All India Radio.

Parkhie completed his schooling from St. Xavier's School, Bokaro, under the Council for the Indian School Certificate Examinations. He later moved to Nagpur, where he studied at Hislop College and pursued engineering at Manoharbhai Patel Institute of Engineering and Technology, Gondia, before continuing at Yashwantrao Chavan College of Engineering, Nagpur.

He also received training in Hindustani classical music under Narayanrao Mangrulkar and Rekha Saney, and obtained the Sangeet Visharad degree from Akhil Bharatiya Gandharva Mahavidyalaya.

== Albums ==
- Baras Gayi Barsaat (1989) – Debut geet and ghazal album, released on cassette by Musireca Cassettes Inc.; also featured Pratima Parkhie
- Ahteraam – Tribute to legendary poets, sung and composed by Shishir Parkhie; featuring poetry of Mirza Ghalib, Meer Taqi Meer, Daagh, Amir Meenai, Ibrahim Zauq and Momin Khan Momin (2008)
- Once More – Ghazal album, sung and composed by Shishir Parkhie; poetry by Ajay Sahaab (2009)
- Roomaniyat – Ghazals of love and longing, sung and composed by Shishir Parkhie; featuring poetry of Allama Iqbal, Majaz Lucknowi, Shahid Kabeer and Jaun Elia (2011); nominated for Global Indian Music Academy Awards (2012)
- Khulus – Ghazals of dreams, desires and destiny, sung and composed by Shishir Parkhie; poetry by Ashok Jharia Shafaq (2012)
- Siyahat – A journey through emotions, sung and composed by Shishir Parkhie; poetry by Koshish (2013); nominated for Global Indian Music Academy Awards (2015)
- Qurbat – Ghazal album, sung and composed by Shishir Parkhie; lyrics by Koshish (2016)
- Virasat – The Legacy of Legends – Ghazal album, sung and composed by Shishir Parkhie; featuring poetry of Quli Qutub Shah, Imam Bakhsh Nasikh, Brij Narayan Chakbast, Asghar Gondvi, Khwaja Meer Dard, Aasi Ghazipuri and Nooh Narvi (2020)
- Ghazal Apni Sunata Hoon – Ghazal album, sung and composed by Shishir Parkhie; poetry by Arun Tiwari Anjaan (2020)

== Singles ==
- Aatish Tha Aftaab Tha – Ghazal single, composed by Shishir Parkhie (October 2012)
- Kya Khona Kya Paana – Hindi ghazal single, composed by Shishir Parkhie (January 2022)
- Laadki Beti – Marathi ghazal single, composed by Shishir Parkhie (April 2023)
- Zindagi Ka Jaam – Ghazal single, composed by Shishir Parkhie (November 2023)
- Khwaab-e-Mustaqbil – Ghazal single, lyrics by Farhat Shahzad, composed by Shishir Parkhie (January 2026)
- Zaada-e-Hasti – Ghazal single, lyrics by Fani Badayuni, composed by Shishir Parkhie (February 2026)

== Bhajan and Devotional albums ==
- Mahima Sadgurunath Ki – T-Series
- Bolo Jai Siya Ram – T-Series
- Shree Mahalaxmi Jagadamba Koradi (Amritvaani) – T-Series
- Tere Naam Anek Tu Ek He Hai – T-Series
- Avtaar Meher Baba Ki Amar Katha – T-Series
- Shree Sai Smaran Stuti Paath – T-Series
- Raah Sai Ne Sachchi Dikhayee Hai – T-Series
- Hum Bharat Ki Shaan Hai – T-Series
- Buddha Vandana Karu (Marathi) – T-Series
- Sheel Sugandha (Marathi) – T-Series
- Pratibimba Krantisuriyache (Marathi) – T-Series
- Shree Gajanan Maharaj Amritvaani – Venus Records & Tapes
- Annayog – Bhojan Mantras – Times Music
- Geet Geeta (Complete Bhagavad Gita in Hindi) – Times Music
- Devi Mata – Bihaan Music
- Aao Chalein Koradi (VCD – Sampoorna Koradi Devi Yatra Darshan) – T-Series
- Prabhu Ke Mangal Gun Gaao (VCD) – R-Series
- Ab Meri Awaaz Suno – R-Series
- Utha Gadya Arunodaya Zala (Marathi) – R-Series
- Mera Chakradhar – Krishna Music
- Dhammakranti (Marathi)
- Satguru Mahima – Manav Dharm
- Shri Hans Chalisa – Manav Dharm
- Darakade Valali Tujhya Gautamachi Paule (Marathi) – T-Series

== Awards and recognition ==
Shishir Parkhie received the Swarchaitanya Maharashtra State Award from Swarmegh Art Foundation, Nagpur, in February 2026.

He has been nominated twice for the Global Indian Music Academy Awards in the Best Ghazal Album category.

He has been featured among the 30 Most Famous Indian Ghazal Singers in DesiBlitz.

He has also been recognized as one of the notable stars from Nagpur by Nagpur Today.

He has been featured in an article titled Ghazal Wave of India.

== Notable ghazal concerts and performances ==
=== International ===
- Shayar Aur Ghazal concert in Kuwait, organized by the Indian Cultural Society.
- Tribute concerts dedicated to Jagjit Singh in Ramle, Ashdod and Dimona, Israel.
- Performance for the Embassy of India in Jeddah.
- Private ghazal concerts in Nairobi, Dubai and Bahrain.

=== India ===
- Tribute concerts dedicated to Jagjit Singh in Nagpur and other cities.
- Tribute concert dedicated to Pankaj Udhas.
- Performance at the Indian Science Congress (2023).
- Performance at the International Conference of ISOT (2022).
- Launch concerts for the albums Ahteraam, Khulus and Siyahat.
- Ghazal concert at Damodar Hall, Mumbai, on Women's Day.
- Performance at the Golden Jubilee celebrations of St. Xavier's School, Bokaro Steel City.
- Performances at corporate and cultural events across cities including Mumbai, Delhi, Bengaluru, Hyderabad, Patna, Kozhikode and Pune.
- Performances at events such as the Festival of Lights in Nagpur, Holi events at Gondwana Club, and pre-Diwali events.
