= Shyamkumar Barve =

Indian politician

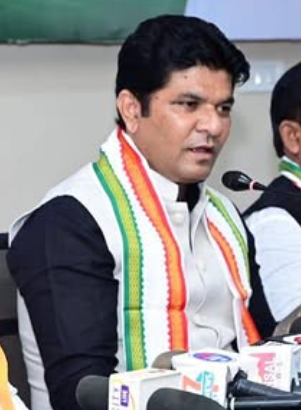
- Barve in 2025

Member of Parliament, Lok Sabha
- Incumbent
- Assumed office 4 June 2024
- Preceded by: Krupal Balaji Tumane
- Constituency: Ramtek

Personal details
- Born: Shyamkumar Daulat Barve; 22 October 1978 (age 47) Tekadi, Maharashtra, India
- Party: Indian National Congress (2007-present)
- Spouse: Rashmi Shyamkumar Barve (m. 2007)
- Children: 2
- Nickname: Bablu Bhau Barve

Shyamkumar Daulat Barve (born 12 October 1978), also known as Bablu Barve, is an Indian politician and Member of Parliament in the 18th Lok Sabha from Ramtek constituency. He is a member of Indian National Congress.

== Personal life ==
Shyamkumar Barve was born to Daulat Barve and Ragina Barve on 12 October 1978 in Tekadi, Maharashtra. He married Rashmi Shyamkumar Barve on 6 March 2007, with whom he has a son and a daughter.

== Political career ==
Barve has been elected as a Member of Parliament from Ramtek Lok Sabha Constituency. He defeated Raju Devnath Parve of Shiv Sena (SHS) by a margin of 76768 votes.
