= Yashomati Chandrakant Thakur =

Indian politician

Adv. Yashomati Thakur

Minister of Women and Child Development Government of Maharashtra
- In office 30 December 2019 – 29 June 2022
- Governor: Bhagat Singh Koshyari
- Chief Minister: Uddhav Thackeray
- Deputy CM: Ajit Pawar
- Preceded by: Pankaja Munde
- Succeeded by: Aditi Tatkare

Guardian minister of Amravati District Government of Maharashtra
- In office 9 January 2020 – 29 June 2022
- Constituency: Teosa

Member of Maharashtra Legislative Assembly
- In office (2009-2014), (2014-2019), (2019 – 2024)
- Preceded by: Sahebrao Tatte
- Succeeded by: Rajesh Shriramji Wankhade
- Constituency: Teosa

Personal details
- Born: 17 May 1974 (age 52) Mozari, Teosa Taluka, Amravati District
- Party: Indian National Congress
- Website: yashomatithakur.in

Adv. Yashomati Chandrakant Thakur is a politician from Maharashtra and senior member of the Indian National Congress and She is daughter of the late former MLA of Teosa Assembly constituency Chandrakant alias Bhaiyyasabeb Thakur.

== Career ==
Thakur was the guardian minister of Amravati District Government of Maharashtra 2020-2022 and was member of the 14th Maharashtra Legislative Assembly, where she represented the Teosa Assembly Constituency.

Thakur was appointed AICC secretary for the congress party affairs in the Karnataka state. She was appointed AICC secretary for Amravati, Maharashtra.

Yashomat Thakur won for the third consecutive time from the Teosa assembly; before her, her father represented the same constituency multiple times.

She was sworn in as a cabinet minister in the Uddhav Thackeray led Mahavikas Aghadi Government. She was also the guardian minister of Amravati district.

On 21 November 2025, independent Maharashtra MLA Ravi Rana claimed that Thakur would join the Bharatiya Janata Party within the next six months.

Thakur was appointed Vidhansabha Talika president on 16 December 2019 by Nana Patole for the winter session of Maharashtra Assembly held in Nagpur Vidarbha.

== Criminal case ==
A sessions court in Amravati on October 15 convicted Thakur, who is the state's women and child development minister, and three others including her driver, in the case and sentenced them to three months imprisonment.
