= Kamthi Assembly constituency =

Constituency of the Maharashtra legislative assembly in India

Coordinates: 21.22°N 79.20°E

Kamthi
- Constituency No. 58 for the Maharashtra Legislative Assembly

Constituency details
- Country: India
- Region: Western India
- State: Maharashtra
- District: Nagpur
- Lok Sabha constituency: Ramtek
- Established: 1952
- Total electors: 502,099
- Reservation: None

Member of Legislative Assembly
- 15th Maharashtra Legislative Assembly
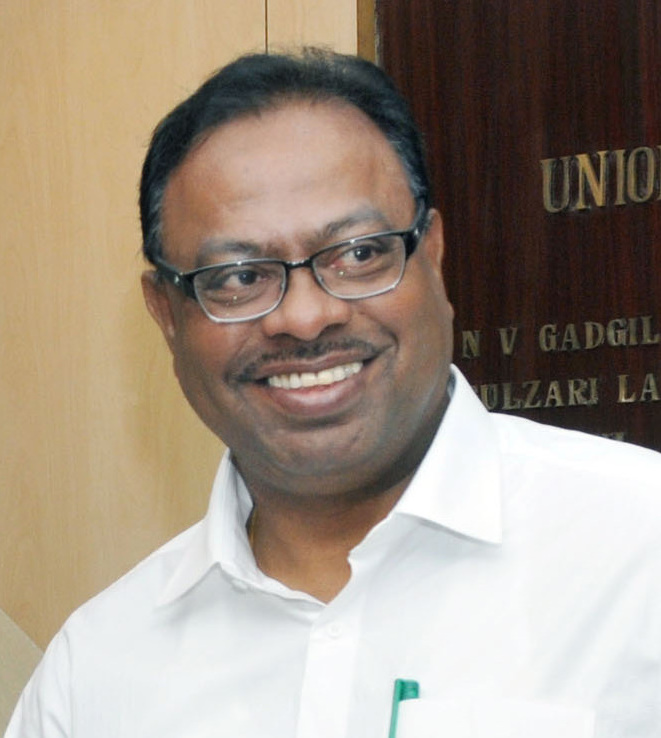
- Incumbent Chandrashekhar Bawankule
- Party: BJP
- Alliance: NDA
- Elected year: 2024

Kamthi Assembly constituency, (formerly Kamptee) also spelled Kamathi or Kamptee, is one of the twelve constituencies of the Maharashtra Vidhan Sabha located in the Nagpur district.

It has been a part of Ramtek (Lok Sabha constituency) (SC) from Nagpur district since 2008. It used to be part of Nagpur Lok Sabha constituency until 2008.

== Members of the Legislative Assembly ==
Year	Member	Party
1952	Bajrangji Lahanu Kadu Thekedar	Indian National Congress
1962	Anantram Dayal Choudhari	Indian National Congress
1967	S. Khan A. Kgan Pathan	Indian National Congress
1972	S. Khan A. Kgan Pathan	Indian National Congress
1978	Bhosle Tajsingrao Rajelaxmanrao	Indian National Congress
1980	Deotale Sureshbabu Baliramji	Indian National Congress
1985	Bhoyar Yadavrao Krushnarao	Indian National Congress
1990	Bhoyar Yadavrao Krushnarao	Indian National Congress
1995	Radke Deorao Santoshrao	Independent politician
1999	Sulekha Narayan Kumbhare	Republican Party of India
2004	Chandrashekhar Bawankule	Bharatiya Janata Party
2009	Chandrashekhar Bawankule	Bharatiya Janata Party
2014	Chandrashekhar Bawankule	Bharatiya Janata Party
2019	Tekchand Sawarkar	Bharatiya Janata Party
2024	Chandrashekhar Bawankule	Bharatiya Janata Party

== Election results ==
=== Assembly Election 2024 ===
2024 Maharashtra Legislative Assembly election : Kamthi
Party	Candidate	Votes	%	±%
BJP	Chandrashekhar Bawankule	174,979	54.42	▲8.43
INC	Suresh Yadavrao Bhoyar	1,34,033	41.69	▲0.02
BSP	Er. Vikrant Surendra Meshram	4,502	1.40	▼1.56
VBA	Praful Anandrao Manke	2,779	0.86	▼3.26
NOTA	None of the Above	1,168	0.36	▼0.55
Margin of victory		40,946	12.74	▲8.41
Turnout		3,22,678	64.27	▲5.66
Total valid votes		3,21,510		
Registered electors		5,02,099		▲14.06
BJP hold		Swing	▲8.43	

=== Assembly Election 2019 ===
2019 Maharashtra Legislative Assembly election : Kamthi
Party	Candidate	Votes	%	±%
BJP	Tekchand Sawarkar	118,182	45.99	▼8.65
INC	Suresh Yadavrao Bhoyar	1,07,066	41.67	▲4.27
VBA	Rajesh Bapurao Kakade	10,601	4.13	New
AIMIM	Shakeebur Rahman Atiqur Rahman	8,345	3.25	New
BSP	Praful Anandrao Manke	7,612	2.96	New
NOTA	None of the Above	2,347	0.91	▼0.36
Margin of victory		11,116	4.33	▼12.92
Turnout		2,59,462	58.94	▼3.06
Total valid votes		2,56,965		
Registered electors		4,40,221		▲16.59
BJP hold		Swing	▼8.65	

=== Assembly Election 2014 ===
2014 Maharashtra Legislative Assembly election : Kamthi
Party	Candidate	Votes	%	±%
BJP	Chandrashekhar Bawankule	126,755	54.64	▲5.28
INC	Rajendra Bhausaheb Mulak	86,753	37.40	▲4.18
SS	Tapeshwar Pundlik Vaidya	12,791	5.51	New
NOTA	None of the Above	2,962	1.28	New
Margin of victory		40,002	17.24	▲1.10
Turnout		2,35,038	62.25	▲2.64
Total valid votes		2,31,973		
Registered electors		3,77,591		▲15.25
BJP hold		Swing	▲5.28	

=== Assembly Election 2009 ===
2009 Maharashtra Legislative Assembly election : Kamthi
Party	Candidate	Votes	%	±%
BJP	Chandrashekhar Bawankule	95,080	49.36	▲14.50
INC	Gawande Sunita Ramesh	63,987	33.22	New
Bahujan Republican Ekta Manch	Sulekha Narayan Kumbhare	24,236	12.58	New
BSP	Suryawanshi Manik Namdeo	4,098	2.13	▼7.31
Independent	Raju Hindustani	2,282	1.18	New
Independent	Manwatkar Pramod Haridas	1,239	0.64	New
Margin of victory		31,093	16.14	▲11.55
Turnout		1,92,776	58.84	▼7.24
Total valid votes		1,92,620		
Registered electors		3,27,629		▲34.36
BJP hold		Swing	▲14.50	

=== Assembly Election 2004 ===
2004 Maharashtra Legislative Assembly election : Kamthi
Party	Candidate	Votes	%	±%
BJP	Chandrashekhar Bawankule	56,128	34.86	▲1.84
RPI	Sulekha Narayan Kumbhare	48,734	30.27	▼7.08
Independent	Shahane Purushottam Panjabrao	27,192	16.89	New
BSP	Bhoyar Yadavrao Krushnarao	15,203	9.44	▲8.19
Independent	Mohammad Aslam Azimuddin	7,544	4.69	New
Independent	Raju Hindustani	2,202	1.37	New
SP	Chawre Mayatai	1,688	1.05	New
Margin of victory		7,394	4.59	▲0.26
Turnout		1,61,021	66.04	▲5.98
Total valid votes		1,61,016		
Registered electors		2,43,836		▲20.59
BJP gain from RPI		Swing	▼2.49	

=== Assembly Election 1999 ===
1999 Maharashtra Legislative Assembly election : Kamthi
Party	Candidate	Votes	%	±%
RPI	Sulekha Narayan Kumbhare	45,350	37.35	New
BJP	Akare Manohar Bajirao	40,094	33.02	New
NCP	Bhoyar Yadavrao Krushnarao	18,088	14.90	New
Independent	Radke Deorao Santoshrao	15,458	12.73	New
BSP	Mohammed Shafi Mohammed Ismail	1,519	1.25	New
Margin of victory		5,256	4.33	▼11.20
Turnout		1,26,653	62.64	▼12.43
Total valid votes		1,21,433		
Registered electors		2,02,199		▼0.16
RPI gain from Independent		Swing	▼3.35	

=== Assembly Election 1995 ===
1995 Maharashtra Legislative Assembly election : Kamthi
Party	Candidate	Votes	%	±%
Independent	Radke Deorao Santoshrao	59,738	40.69	New
INC	Bhoyar Yadavrao Krushnarao	36,937	25.16	▼7.98
JD	Sulekha Narayan Kumbhare	30,062	20.48	▲11.28
SS	Hatwar Radhyeshyam Fakiraji	8,114	5.53	▼8.14
BBM	Balbudhe Hari Balwanta	3,733	2.54	New
Independent	Vaidya Manikrao Dayaramji	2,425	1.65	New
Independent	Mudholkar Laxman Gajanan	936	0.64	New
Margin of victory		22,801	15.53	▲14.96
Turnout		1,50,107	74.12	▲10.92
Total valid votes		1,46,807		
Registered electors		2,02,522		▲19.03
Independent gain from INC		Swing	▲7.55	

=== Assembly Election 1990 ===
1990 Maharashtra Legislative Assembly election : Kamthi
Party	Candidate	Votes	%	±%
INC	Bhoyar Yadavrao Krushnarao	34,715	33.14	▼37.11
Independent	Radke Deorao Santoshrao	34,116	32.57	New
SS	Hatwar Radhesham Fakira	14,319	13.67	New
JD	Pathan Nasirullah Pir Mohammad	9,634	9.20	New
RPI	Chimankar Murlidhar Sitaram	6,818	6.51	▼13.36
BSP	Wali Mohammad Nur Mohammad	2,706	2.58	New
Margin of victory		599	0.57	▼49.81
Turnout		1,06,493	62.59	▲12.57
Total valid votes		1,04,746		
Registered electors		1,70,137		▲30.96
INC hold		Swing	▼37.11	

=== Assembly Election 1985 ===
1985 Maharashtra Legislative Assembly election : Kamthi
Party	Candidate	Votes	%	±%
INC	Bhoyar Yadavrao Krushnarao	44,718	70.26	New
RPI	Ramtake Sampat Mukaji	12,648	19.87	New
BJP	Kashinathji Ganpatrao Patil	4,940	7.76	▼5.06
Independent	Ashok Tukaram Meshram	892	1.40	New
Margin of victory		32,070	50.38	▲4.10
Turnout		64,335	49.52	▲14.79
Total valid votes		63,650		
Registered electors		1,29,911		▲6.98
INC gain from INC(I)		Swing	▲7.62	

=== Assembly Election 1980 ===
1980 Maharashtra Legislative Assembly election : Kamthi
Party	Candidate	Votes	%	±%
INC(I)	Deotale Sureshbabu Baliramji	26,018	62.64	▲8.97
INC(U)	Dr. Mohammad Shafi Qureshi	6,791	16.35	New
BJP	Hydari Jainul Abedin	5,324	12.82	New
Independent	Hedaoo Yeshwant Chaitusao	1,953	4.70	New
JP	Varma Prakashchand Goverdhandas	1,204	2.90	New
Margin of victory		19,227	46.29	▲13.39
Turnout		42,165	34.72	▼33.83
Total valid votes		41,539		
Registered electors		1,21,436		▲6.62
INC(I) hold		Swing	▲8.97	

=== Assembly Election 1978 ===
1978 Maharashtra Legislative Assembly election : Kamthi
Party	Candidate	Votes	%	±%
INC(I)	Bhosle Tajsingrao Rajelaxmanrao	41,581	53.66	New
RPI(K)	Rai Rajni Kaushal Prasad	16,090	20.76	▲1.43
RPI	Kumbhare Narayanrao Haribhau	7,386	9.53	▼1.64
CPI	Deshkar Manohar Madhaorao	6,319	8.15	New
Independent	Bagdi Manganlal Radhakishan	4,522	5.84	New
Independent	Varhade Vithalrao Ganpatrao	552	0.71	New
Independent	Hingnekar Arvind Morubhau	533	0.69	New
Margin of victory		25,491	32.90	▲1.10
Turnout		79,081	69.43	▲19.10
Total valid votes		77,488		
Registered electors		1,13,895		▲13.67
INC(I) gain from INC		Swing	▲2.53	

=== Assembly Election 1972 ===
1972 Maharashtra Legislative Assembly election : Kamthi
Party	Candidate	Votes	%	±%
INC	S. Khan A. Kgan Pathan	25,075	51.14	▲9.64
RPI(K)	Ramdas Vithoba Meshram	9,481	19.33	New
Independent	Mohammed Rafique Ldu	7,044	14.36	New
RPI	Someshchander N. Vighhri	5,476	11.17	▼16.88
Independent	Jamilahmed Noormohmad	1,353	2.76	New
Margin of victory		15,594	31.80	▲18.35
Turnout		50,778	50.68	▼9.51
Total valid votes		49,036		
Registered electors		1,00,197		▲9.71
INC hold		Swing	▲9.64	

=== Assembly Election 1967 ===
1967 Maharashtra Legislative Assembly election : Kamthi
Party	Candidate	Votes	%	±%
INC	S. Khan A. Kgan Pathan	22,154	41.50	▼0.88
RPI	N. H. Kumbhare	14,972	28.05	▼3.65
Independent	J. J. Kale	6,926	12.97	New
ABJS	M. B. Vyas	5,150	9.65	▲2.5
PSP	M. S. Yelne	3,046	5.71	New
Independent	B. A. Jaiswal	1,135	2.13	New
Margin of victory		7,182	13.45	▲2.77
Turnout		57,663	63.14	▼6.00
Total valid votes		53,383		
Registered electors		91,327		▲24.51
INC hold		Swing	▼0.88	

=== Assembly Election 1962 ===
1962 Maharashtra Legislative Assembly election : Kamthi
Party	Candidate	Votes	%	±%
INC	Anantram Dayal Choudhari	20,036	42.38	▼12.75
RPI	Bhalchandra Haribhau Sontakhe	14,986	31.70	New
Independent	Balkrishna Nagoji Vaidya	5,996	12.68	New
ABJS	Hiralal Yelayya Pipar	3,378	7.15	▼0.23
Independent	Sitaram Bhakruji Mendhe	1,849	3.91	New
Independent	Bakaram Vithal	1,030	2.18	New
Margin of victory		5,050	10.68	▼15.07
Turnout		50,713	69.14	▲13.77
Total valid votes		47,275		
Registered electors		73,352		▲76.30
INC hold		Swing	▼12.75	

=== Assembly Election 1952 ===
1952 Madhya Pradesh Legislative Assembly election : Kamthi
Party	Candidate	Votes	%	±%
INC	Bajrangji Lahanu Kadu Thekedar	11,625	55.14	New
SCF	Nisarali Abdul Kayum	6,195	29.38	New
ABJS	Eendsham Jasdesndan Wahie	1,556	7.38	New
Independent	Morubhau Mahadeo Hingankar	516	2.45	New
Independent	Santoshrao Mahadeorao Daware	450	2.13	New
Independent	Haridas Kashinath Chandorkar	379	1.80	New
Independent	Kama Rajeshwar Bapaiya	363	1.72	New
Margin of victory		5,430	25.75	
Turnout		21,084	50.68	
Total valid votes		21,084		
Registered electors		41,606		
INC win (new seat)				

== See also ==
- Kamthi
