= Dwaram Mallikarjun Reddy =

Indian politician

Dwaram Mallikarjun Reddy is a member of the 13th Maharashtra Legislative Assembly. He represents the Ramtek Assembly Constituency. He belongs to the Bharatiya Janata Party He is a former state government contractor. In September, 2014, he resigned from his firm, before filing his nominations as government contractors are debarred from contesting elections. In 2009, Reddy had unsuccessfully contested elections to the same seat representing the Gondwana Ganatantra Party.

On 5 January 2016, Reddy and some of his supporters were arrested for ransacking a car at the Maharashtra Tourism Development Corporation's Rajkamal resort and bar.
