= Davlameti =

- census town
- Location in Maharashtra, India
- Coordinates: 21.15°N 78.98°E
- Country: India
- State: Maharashtra
- District: Nagpur

Government
  - Type: Grampnchyat
  - Body: Davlameti Grampanchayat

Population (2001)
  - Total: 8,807

Languages
  - Official: Marathi
- Time zone: UTC+5:30 (IST)
- Postal code: 440023
- Vehicle registration: MH 40

Davlameti is a census town in Nagpur district in the state of Maharashtra, India.

== Demographics ==
As of 2001 India census, Davlameti had a population of 8807. Males constitute 52% of the population and females 48%. Davlameti has an average literacy rate of 77%, higher than the national average of 59.5%: male literacy is 86% and, female literacy is 67%. In Davlameti, 13% of the population is under 6 years of age.
