= Bahujan Republican Ekta Manch =

- Abbreviation: BREM
- Leader: Sulekha Kumbhare
- Headquarters: Kamptee
- ECI Status: Registered Unrecognized Party
- Alliance: National Democratic Alliance

The Bahujan Republican Ekta Manch (BREM) is a regional political party from Maharashtra, India, led by Sulekha Kumbhare. It supported the United Progressive Alliance (UPA) in the 2014 general election, but extended its support to the National Democratic Alliance (NDA) before the 2014 Maharashtra Legislative Assembly election due to differences with the UPA leader Indian National Congress over seat distribution.

== See also ==
- Dalit
