= Sameer Meghe =

Indian politician

Sameer Dattatraya Meghe

Member of the Maharashtra Legislative Assembly for Hingna
- Incumbent
- Assumed office 24 October 2019
- Preceded by: Vijaybabu Pandurangji Ghodmare

Personal details
- Born: 12 February 1978 (age 48) Nagpur, Maharashtra, India
- Party: Bharatiya Janata Party (BJP) (2014-Present)
- Other political affiliations: Indian National Congress (INC) (2003-2014)
- Spouse: Vrinda Sameer Meghe
- Children: Raghav Sameer Meghe; Ridhima Sameer Meghe
- Parents: Datta Meghe (Father); Shalinitai Meghe (Mother)
- Relatives: Sagar Meghe (Brother)
- Education: Law College Nagpur; Dharampeth Junior College
- Occupation: Politician; Entrepreneur
- Website: www.mginagpur.com

Sameer Dattatraya Meghe (born 12 February 1978) is a member of the 13th Maharashtra Legislative Assembly. He is a member of the Bharatiya Janata Party (BJP) and represents the Hingna constituency.

Sameer Meghe is son of former Indian National Congress MP, Datta Meghe. Sameer Meghe resigned from the Indian National Congress in June 2014, along with his father and brother Sagar Meghe, and joined the Bharatiya Janata Party. Meghe was president of Nagpur District Indian Youth Congress.

== Early life ==
Sameer Meghe was born to Shalinitai and Dattaji Meghe, a four time MP.

== Professional life ==
- President

Yeshwantrao Chavan College Of Engineering (YCCE), Wanadongri Village, Hingna SubDivision Nagpur, Maharashtra, India

- Secretary

Datta Meghe Institute of Engineering Technology and Research.

- Treasurer

Nagar Yuwak Shikshan Sanstha

- Secretary

Datta Meghe Institute of Medical Sciences

- Chairman

Barrister Sheshrao Wankhede Cooperative Spinning Mill, Butibori

- Managing Director

Raghav Associates, Nagpur

== Education and early career ==
Sameer Meghe holds a Bachelor of Commerce Degree.

== Family and personal life ==
Sameer Meghe is married to Vrinda Meghe and they have son Raghav and daughter Ridhima.

== Political career ==
In 2011, elected president of Youth Congress from Nagpur Lok Sabha constituency polling almost 750 votes.

In 2014, elected as MLA of Maharashtra from Hingna by 23,158 Votes from NCP leader & former Cabinet Minister who is candidate Rameshchandra Gopikisan Bang.

=== Positions held ===
==== Within BJP ====
- MLA from Hingna Legislative Assembly
