= Tekchand Sawarkar =

Indian politician

Member of Legislative Assembly Maharashtra
- In office 2019–2024
- Preceded by: Chandrashekhar Bawankule
- Succeeded by: Chandrashekhar Bawankule
- Constituency: Kamptee

Personal details
- Party: Bharatiya Janata Party
- Profession: Politician

Tekchand Shrawan Sawarkar is an Indian politician who won the 14th Maharashtra Legislative Assembly election. He represents Kamthi (Vidhan Sabha constituency). He was elected in 2019 Maharashtra Legislative Assembly election. Sawarkar is from the Bharatiya Janata Party.
