= Girish Vyas =

Indian politician

Member of Legislative Council of Maharashtra
- In office 4 Jan 2016 – 2 Jan 2022
- Preceded by: Rajendra Mulak
- Constituency: Nagpur Swaraj Sanstha

Personal details
- Born: 27 March 1957 (age 69) Nagpur, Bombay State, India
- Party: Bharatiya Janata Party
- Spouse: Shobha Vyas
- Children: Son: Aditya Vyas Daughter: Mithil Hisodiya
- Education: Law College Nagpur; Dharampeth Junior College
- Occupation: Politician

Girish Pandit Baccharaj Vyas (born 27 March 1958) was elected as member of the Maharashtra Legislative Council from Nagpur Local Authorities' Constituency.

== Positions held ==
=== Within BJP ===
- State Spokesman, Maharashtra BJP

=== Legislative ===
- Member of Legislative Council, started 4 Jan. 2016
