= Vinayak Korde =

Indian politician

Vinayakrao Marotrao Korde alias Dadasaheb is an Indian politician and member of the Bharatiya Janata Party. Korde was a member of the Maharashtra Legislative Assembly from the Achalpur constituency in Amravati district. He was Minister of State in the Narayan Rane ministry.
