= Amrut Ganpat Sonar =

Indian politician

Member of Parliament, Lok Sabha
- In office 1967-1974
- Preceded by: Madhaorao Bhagwantrao Patil
- Succeeded by: Ram Hedaoo
- Constituency: Ramtek

Personal details
- Born: 14 March 1916
- Party: Indian National Congress
- Spouse: Sarswati Sonar

Amrut Ganpat Sonar (1916-1974) was an Indian politician, elected to the Lok Sabha, the lower house of the Parliament of India as a member of the Indian National Congress.
