= Sanjay Meshram =

Indian politician

Sanjay Narayanrao Meshram (born 1959) is an Indian politician from Maharashtra. He is an MLA from Umred Assembly constituency, which is reserved for Scheduled Caste community, in Nagpur district. He won the 2024 Maharashtra Legislative Assembly election representing the Indian National Congress.

== Early life and education ==
Meshram is born in Nagpur, Maharashtra. He is the son of Naryanrao Meshram. He completed his BTech in mechanical at IIT, Mumbai in 1986. He is a former Rotary district president.

== Career ==
Meshram won from Umred Assembly constituency representing Indian National Congress in the 2024 Maharashtra Legislative Assembly election. He polled 85,372 votes and defeated his nearest rival, Sudhir Laxman Parwe of the Bharatiya Janata Party, by a margin of 12,825 votes.

In January 2024, he filed a plea in the Supreme Court along with Congress leader Jaya Thakur, seeking an interim stay on the then new law for appointing Election Commission of India members, where the chief justice of India was excluded from the panel. However, the court declined the request.
