= Sudhir Laxmanrao Parwe =

Indian politician

Sudhir Laxmanrao Parwe is an Indian politician. He was a member of the 13th Maharashtra Legislative Assembly. He represents the Umred Assembly Constituency. He was the Chairman of Panchayati Raj Committee (State Minister Status), from 2017-2019. He is a member of the Bharatiya Janata Party.

== Controversy ==
In April, 2015, Parwe was sentenced to a two-year prison term for slapping a primary school teacher in 2005. He appealed this sentence, and was granted bail. Parwe was then a member of the Kargao Zilla Parishad Constituency. The teacher was the acting headmaster and had allegedly misbehaved with a female school employee.
