= Sulekha Kumbhare =

Indian politician, lawyer, and activist

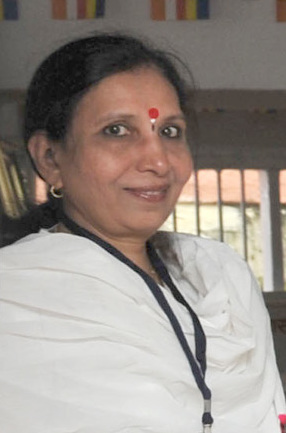
Sulekha Kumbhare

Sulekha Narayan Kumbhare (born 1962) is an Indian politician, lawyer and Ambedkarite-Buddhist activist. She is founder and president of the Bahujan Republican Ekta Manch. She served as cabinet minister from 1999 to 2014 in the Government of Maharashtra. Kumbhare was member of the Maharashtra Legislative Assembly (1999 to 2004) from the Kamthi constituency in Nagpur district as Republican Party of India. She is a member of the National Commission for Minorities. She is an Ambedkarite, and spends the rest of her life in propagating Buddhism.
