= Wanadongri =

- city
- Location in Maharashtra, India
- Coordinates: 20.9579°N 78.8821°E
- Country: India
- State: Maharashtra
- District: Nagpur
- Pincode: 441110

Government
  - Type: Municipal Council
  - Body: Wanadongri Municipal Council

Population (2011)
  - Total: 47,150

Languages
  - Official: Marathi
- Time zone: UTC+5:30 (IST)

Wanadongri is a city and a Municipal Council in Nagpur district in the Indian state of Maharashtra. It has Nagpur's first DMart. Varsha Shahakar is the first woman Municipal Council President of Wanadongri.

== Demographics ==
As of 2001 India census, Wanadongri had a population of 17,150. Males constitute 54% of the population and females 46%. Wanadongri has an average literacy rate of 69%, higher than the national average of 59.5%: male literacy is 75%, and female literacy is 62%. In Wanadongri, 17% of the population is under 6 years of age.
