= Prahar Janshakti Party =

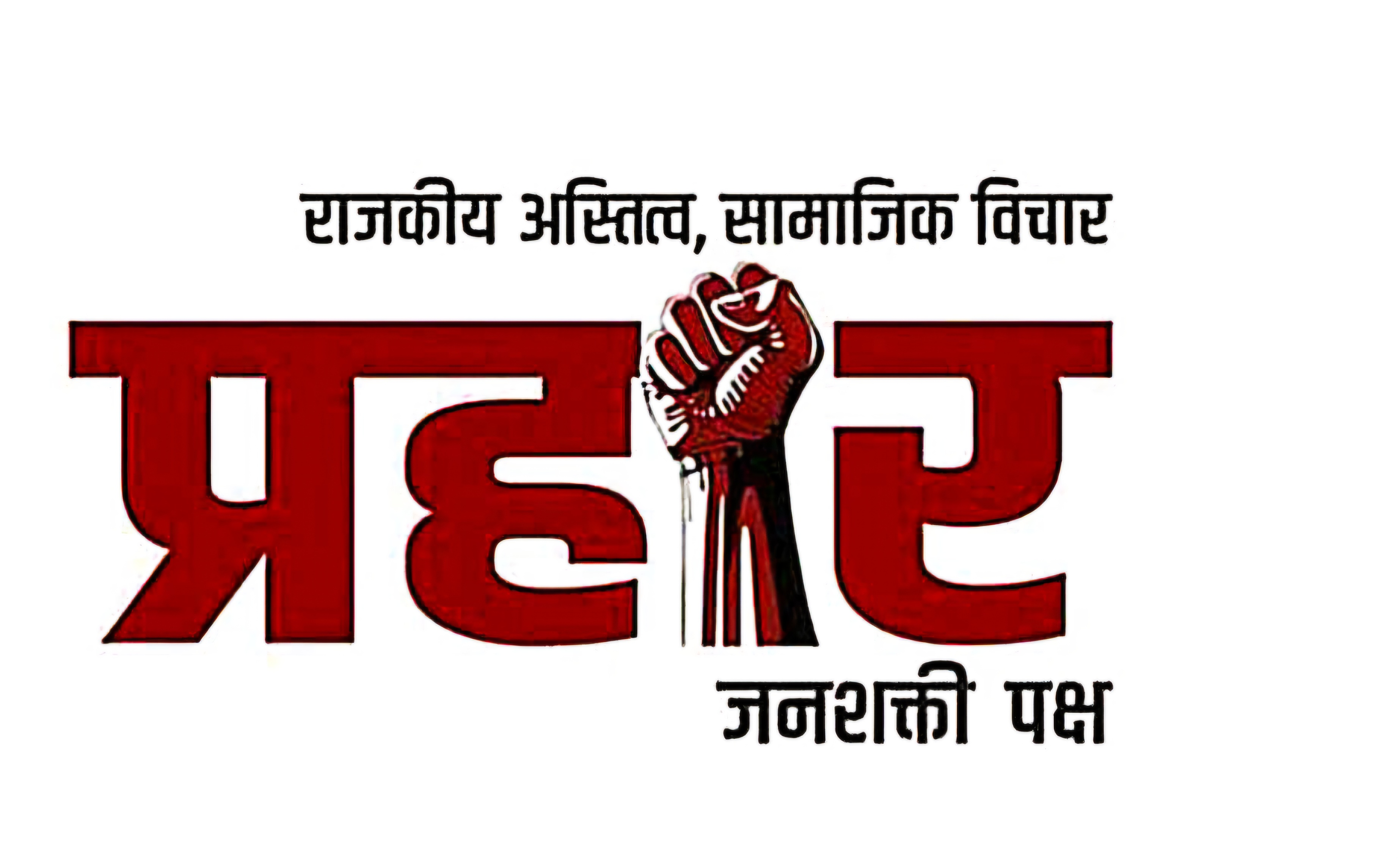
- Abbreviation: PHJSP
- Founder: Omprakash Babarao Kadu
- Founded: Achalpur, Maharashtra
- Merged into: Shiv Sena
- Ideology: Agrarianism
- Colours: Red
- Slogan: Apana Bhidu Bachchu Kadu
- Alliance: UPA (2019 - 2022); NDA (2022 - 2024); Parivartan Mahashakti Aghadi (PMA) (2024 - 2026)

Election symbol
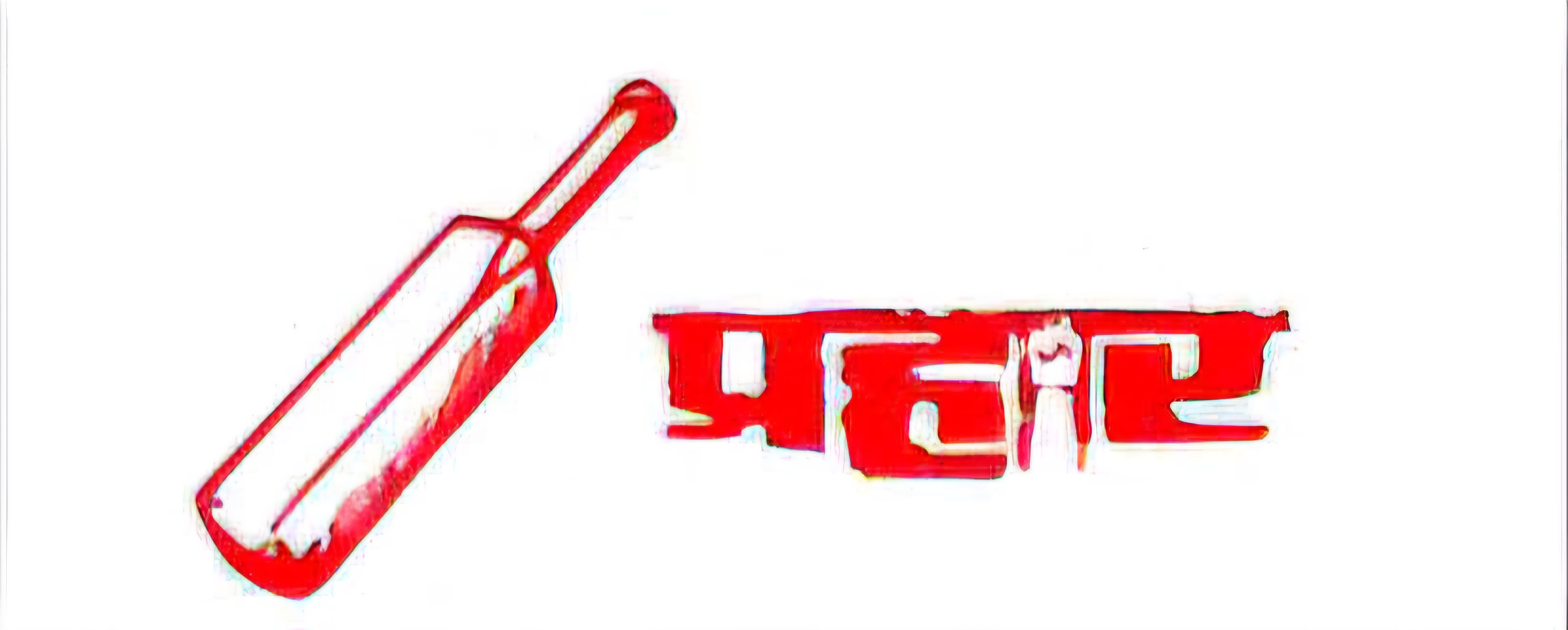

The Prahar Janshakti Party, abbreviated as, PHJSP was an Indian political party in Maharashtra, India. PHJSP was founded in 1999 by Omprakash Babarao Kadu alias Bacchu Kadu with the ideology of Farmers Development. It was merged into the Shiv Sena on 30 April 2026.

== Maharashtra Assembly Elections Results ==
Prahar Janshakti Party results in the Maharashtra Assembly Elections
Election Year	Overall votes	% of overall votes	Total seats	seats won/ seats contensted	Change in seats	Outco
2024	3,07,877	1.55%	288	0 / 60	▼	—N/a
