= 2019 Indian general election in Maharashtra =

Indian state election

- 11 April 2019 to 29 April 2019

All 48 Maharashtra seats in the Lok Sabha
- Opinion polls
- Turnout: 61.02% (▲0.70%)
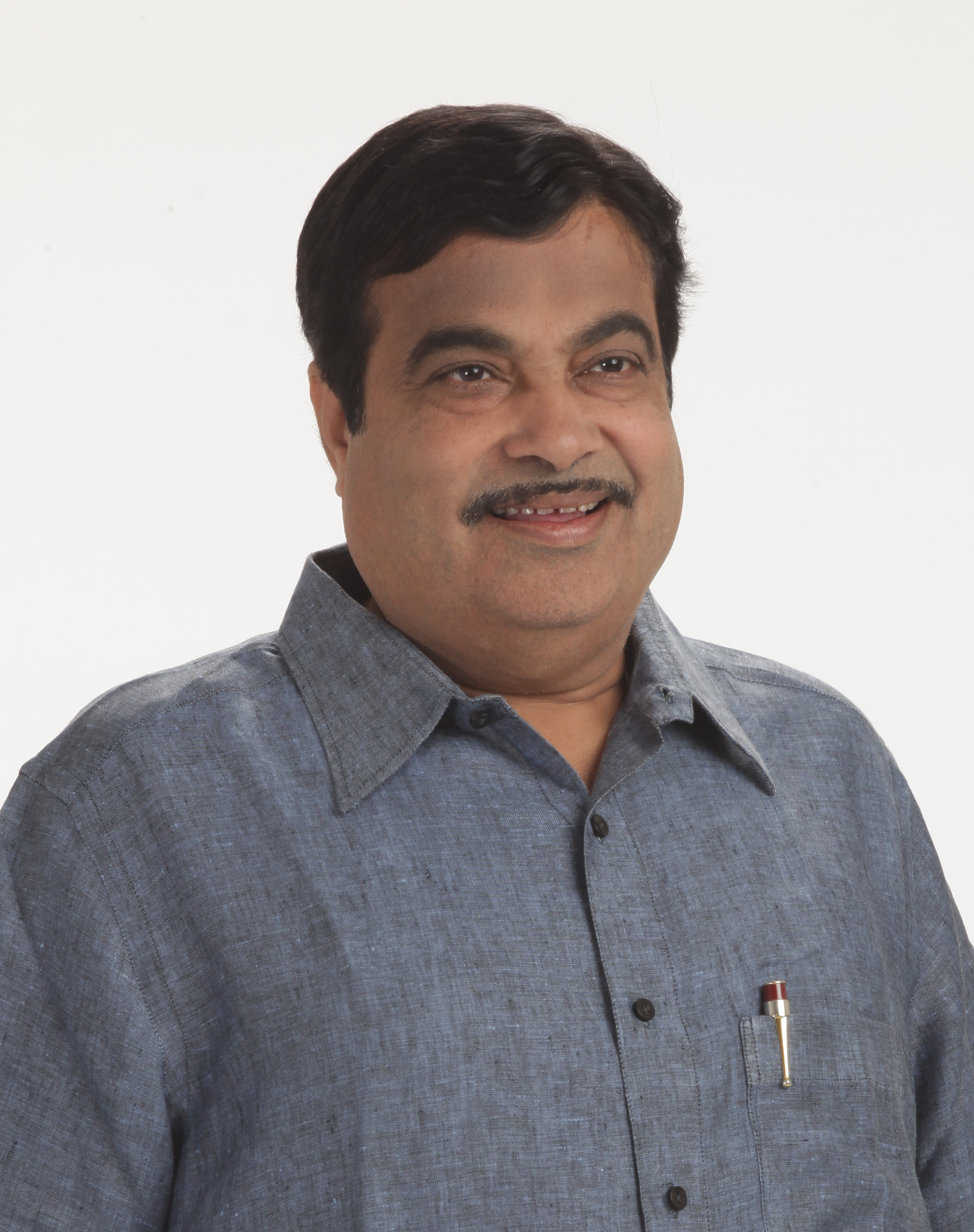

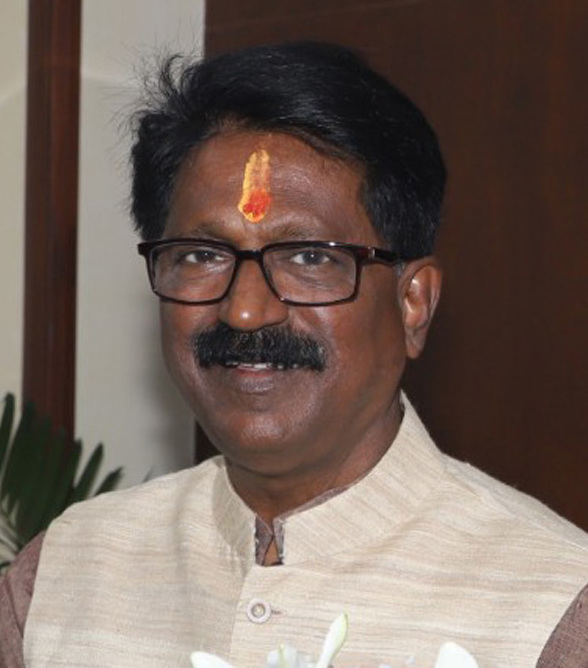

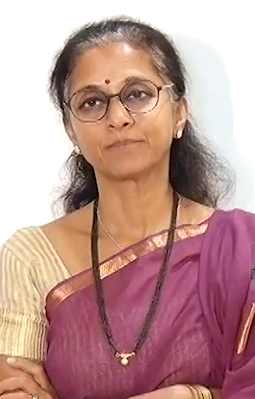

	First party	Second party
Leader	Nitin Gadkari	Arvind Sawant
Party	BJP	SS
Alliance	NDA	NDA
Leader's seat	Nagpur (won)	Mumbai South (won)
Last election	23	18
Seats won	23	18
Seat change	Steady	Steady
Percentage	27.84	23.5%
Swing	▲0.28pp	▲2.68pp
	Third party	Fourth party
Leader	Supriya Sule	Ashok Chavan
Party	NCP	INC
Alliance	UPA	UPA
Leader's seat	Baramati (won)	Nanded (lost)
Last election	4	2
Seats won	4	1
Seat change	Steady	▼1
Percentage	15.66%	16.41%
Swing	▼0.46pp	▼1.88pp
- Maharashtra

Prime Minister before election
Narendra Modi
BJP
Prime Minister after election
Narendra Modi
BJP

The 2019 Indian general election in Maharashtra was held in April 2019. These were held for 48 seats in 4 phases; 11 April (7 seats), 18 April (10 seats), 23 April (14 seats) and 29 April 2019 (17 seats).

The major contenders in the state are the United Progressive Alliance (UPA) and National Democratic Alliance (NDA). UPA consisted of the Indian National Congress and the Nationalist Congress Party whereas the NDA consisted of the Bharatiya Janata Party and the Shiv Sena.

In February 2019, BJP and Shiv Sena again announced alliance with 25 seats for BJP and 23 for Shiv Sena.

In March 2019, Congress and NCP also announced their alliance with each contesting 26 and 22 seats respectively. Of the 26 seats of INC, 1 seat each would be given to Bahujan Vikas Aaghadi (BVA) and Swabhimani Shetkari Saghtana (SSS). Similarly, NCP would also forgo of two seats; one each to SSS and one to Yuva Swabhiman Party.

== Election schedule ==
Poll event	Phase			
Poll event	I	II	III	IV
Notification date	18 March	19 March	28 March	2 April
Last date for filing nomination	25 March	26 March	4 April	9 April
Scrutiny of nomination	26 March	27 March	5 April	10 April
Last Date for withdrawal of nomination	28 March	29 March	8 April	12 April
Date of poll	11 April	18 April	23 April	29 April
Date of counting of votes/Result	23 May 2019			
No. of constituencies	7	10	14	17

== Parties and alliances ==
=== National Democratic Alliance ===

Party	Flag	Symbol	Leader	Seats contested
Bharatiya Janata Party			Nitin Gadkari	25
Shiv Sena			Arvind Sawant	23
Total				48

=== United Progressive Alliance ===

Party	Flag	Symbol	Leader	Seats contested
Indian National Congress			Ashok Chavan	25
Nationalist Congress Party			Supriya Sule	19
Swabhimani Paksha			Raju Shetti	2
Bahujan Vikas Aaghadi			Hitendra Thakur	1
Independent			Navneet Kaur Rana	1
Total				48

=== Vanchit Bahujan Aaghadi + Majlis Party ===
VBA + AIMIM
Party	Flag	Symbol	Leader	Seats
Vanchit Bahujan Aaghadi (Note: VBA Contesting On Whistle Symbol in PC 8 Wardha, PC 7 Amravati, PC 41 Latur, PC 18 Jalna, PC 46 Ratnagiri-Sindhudurg constituencies and Key Symbol in PC 15 Hingoli, PC 45 Madha, PC 22 Palghar.)			Prakash Ambedkar	47
All India Majlis-e-Ittehadul Muslimeen			Imtiyaz Jaleel	1
Total				48

=== Party/Alliance Wise Seat Matrix ===
Alliance & Party
Alliance & Party							Total (UPA)
Alliance & Party		UPA					Total (UPA)
Alliance & Party		INC	NCP	SWP	BVA	IND	Total (UPA)
NDA							
NDA	BJP	16	8	1	—N/a	—N/a	25
NDA	SHS	9	11	1	1	1	23
Total (NDA)		25	19	2	1	1	48

== List of Candidates ==
Constituency		NDA		UPA		VBA + AIMIM	
#	Name	Party	Candidate	Party	Candidate	Party	Candidate
1	Nandurbar (ST)	BJP	Heena Gavit	INC	K. C. Padavi	VBA	Anturlikar Sushil Suresh
2	Dhule	BJP	Subhash Bhamre	INC	Kunal Rohidas Patil	VBA	Nabi Ahmad Ahmad Dulla
3	Jalgaon	BJP	Unmesh Patil	NCP	Gulabrao Deokar	VBA	Anjali Ratnakar Baviskar
4	Raver	BJP	Raksha Khadse	INC	Dr. Ulhas Patil	VBA	Nitin Pralhad Kandelkar
5	Buldhana	SS	Prataprao Jadhav	NCP	Rajendra Shingane	VBA	Baliram Sirskar
6	Akola	BJP	Sanjay Shamrao Dhotre	INC	Hidayat Patel	VBA	Prakash Ambedkar
7	Amravati (SC)	SS	Anandrao Adsul	IND	Navneet Kaur Rana	VBA	Gunwant Deopare
8	Wardha	BJP	Ramdas Tadas	INC	Charulata Tokas	VBA	Dhanraj Wanjari
9	Ramtek (SC)	SS	Krupal Tumane	INC	Kishor Uttamrao Gajbhiye	VBA	Kiran P. Rodge
10	Nagpur	BJP	Nitin Gadkari	INC	Nana Patole	VBA	Manohar Alias Sagar
11	Bhandara-Gondiya	BJP	Sunil Baburao Mendhe	NCP	Nana Panchbudhe	VBA	K. N. Nanhe
12	Gadchiroli–Chimur (ST)	BJP	Ashok Mahadeorao Nete	INC	Namdev Usendi	VBA	Rameshkumar Gajbe
13	Chandrapur-Wani-Arni	BJP	Hansraj Gangaram Ahir	INC	Suresh Dhanorkar	VBA	Rajendra Mahadole
14	Yavatmal–Washim	SS	Bhavana Gawali	INC	Manikrao Thakare	VBA	Pravin Govind Pawar
15	Hingoli	SS	Hemant Sriram Patil	INC	Subhash Wankhede	VBA	Mohan Fattusing Rathod
16	Nanded	BJP	Prataprao Chikhalikar	INC	Ashok Chavan	VBA	Bhinge Yashpal Narsingrao
17	Parbhani	SS	Sanjay Haribhau Jadhav	NCP	Rajesh Vitekar	VBA	Alamgir Mohd. Khan
18	Jalna	BJP	Raosaheb Danve	INC	Vilas Keshavrao Autade	VBA	Sharadchandra Wankhede
19	Aurangabad	SS	Chandrakant Khaire	INC	Subhash Zambad	AIMIM	Imtiyaz Jaleel
20	Dindori (ST)	BJP	Bharati Pawar	NCP	Dhanraj Mahale	VBA	Bapu Kelu Barde
21	Nashik	SS	Hemant Godse	NCP	Sameer Bhujbal	VBA	Pavan Chandrakant Pawar
22	Palghar (ST)	SS	Rajendra Gavit	BVA	Raju Lade	VBA	Suresh Arjun Padavi
23	Bhiwandi	BJP	Kapil Moreshwar Patil	INC	Suresh Kashinath Taware	VBA	Prof. (Dr.) Arun Savant
24	Kalyan	SS	Shrikant Shinde	NCP	Babaji Patil	VBA	Sanjay Hedaoo
25	Thane	SS	Rajan Vichare	NCP	Anand Paranjpe	VBA	Mallikarjun Saibanna Pujari
26	Mumbai North	BJP	Gopal Chinayya Shetty	INC	Urmila Matondkar	VBA	Thorat Sunil Uttamrao
27	Mumbai North West	SS	Gajanan Kirtikar	INC	Sanjay Nirupam	VBA	Suresh Sundar Shetty
28	Mumbai North East	BJP	Manoj Kotak	NCP	Sanjay Dina Patil	VBA	Niharika Khondalay
29	Mumbai North Central	BJP	Poonam Mahajan	INC	Priya Dutt	VBA	Abdur Rehman Anjaria
30	Mumbai South Central	SS	Rahul Shewale	INC	Eknath Gaikwad	VBA	Bhosale Sanjay Sushil
31	Mumbai South	SS	Arvind Sawant	INC	Milind Murli Deora	VBA	Dr. Anil Kumar
32	Raigad	SS	Anant Geete	NCP	Sunil Tatkare	VBA	Suman Bhaskar Koli
33	Maval	SS	Shrirang Barne	NCP	Parth Pawar	VBA	Rajaram Narayan Patil
34	Pune	BJP	Girish Bapat	INC	Mohan Joshi	VBA	Anil Narayan Jadhav
35	Baramati	BJP	Kanchan Rahul Kul	NCP	Supriya Sule	VBA	Padalkar Navanath
36	Shirur	SS	Shivajirao Adhalarao Patil	NCP	Amol Kolhe	VBA	Ovhal Rahul
37	Ahmednagar	BJP	Sujay Vikhe Patil	NCP	Sangram Arun Jagtap	VBA	Sudhakar Laxman Avhad
38	Shirdi (SC)	SS	Sadashiv Lokhande	INC	Bhausaheb Kamble	VBA	Sanjay Laxman Sukhdan
39	Beed	BJP	Pritam Munde	NCP	Bajrang Sonawale	VBA	Pro. Vishnu Jadhav
40	Osmanabad	SS	Omraje Nimbalkar	NCP	Ranajagjitsinha Patil	VBA	Arjun (Dada) Salgar
41	Latur (SC)	BJP	Sudhakar Shrangare	INC	Machhlindra Kamat	VBA	Ram Garkar
42	Solapur (SC)	BJP	Jaisidhesvar Swami	INC	Sushilkumar Shinde	VBA	Prakash Ambedkar
43	Madha	BJP	Ranjit Naik-Nimbalkar	NCP	Sanjay Shinde	VBA	Adv. Vijayrao More
44	Sangli	BJP	Sanjaykaka Patil	SWP	Vishal Patil	VBA	Gopichand Kundlik Padalkar
45	Satara	SS	Narendra Patil	NCP	Udayanraje Bhosale	VBA	Sahadeo Kerappa Aiwale
46	Ratnagiri–Sindhudurg	SS	Vinayak Raut	INC	Navinchandra Bandivadekar	VBA	Maruti Ramchandra Joshi
47	Kolhapur	SS	Sanjay Mandlik	NCP	Dhananjay Mahadik	VBA	Dr. Aruna Mohan Mali
48	Hatkanangle	SS	Dhairyashil Mane	SWP	Raju Shetty	VBA	Aslam Badshahaji Sayyad

== Results ==
=== Party/Alliance-wise ===
Alliance / Party		Popular vote			Seats		
Alliance / Party		Votes	%	±pp	Contested	Won	+/−
NDA	BJP	1,49,12,139	27.59	▲0.27	25	23	Steady
NDA	SHS	1,25,89,064	23.29	▲2.66	23	18	Steady
NDA	Total	2,75,01,203	50.88	▼0.87	48	41	▼1
UPA	INC	87,92,237	16.27	▼1.86	25	1	▼1
UPA	NCP	83,87,363	15.52	▼0.45	19	4	Steady
UPA	SWP	8,34,380	1.54	▼0.73	2	0	▼1
UPA	BVA	4,91,596	0.91	▲0.31	1	0	Steady
UPA	IND	5,10,947	0.95	New entry	1	1	▲1
UPA	Total	1,90,16,523	35.19	▲0.49	48	6	Steady
VBA+	VBA	37,43,560	6.93	New entry	47	0	Steady
VBA+	AIMIM	3,89,042	0.72		1	1	▲1
VBA+	Total	41,32,602	7.65	New entry	48	1	▲1
Others		14,34,606	2.64	Steady	306	0	Steady
IND		14,80,545	2.74	▼0.50	417	0	Steady
NOTA		4,88,766	0.90	▲0.01			
Total		5,40,54,245	100%	-	867	48	-

=== Constituency wise ===
Keys: BJP (23) SS (18) NCP (4) INC (1) AIMIM (1) IND (1)

Constituency		Winner				Runner Up				Margin	%
#	Name	Candidate	Party	Votes	%	Candidate	Party	Votes	%	Margin	%
1	Nandurbar	Heena Gavit	BJP	6,39,136	49.76	K. C. Padavi	INC	5,43,507	42.31	95,629	7.45
2	Dhule	Subhash Bhamre	BJP	6,13,533	56.36	Kunal Patil	INC	3,84,290	35.30	2,29,243	21.06
3	Jalgaon	Unmesh Patil	BJP	7,13,874	65.36	Gulabrao Deokar	NCP	3,02,257	27.67	4,11,617	37.69
4	Raver	Raksha Khadse	BJP	6,55,386	59.77	Ulhas Vasudeo Patil	INC	3,19,504	29.14	3,35,882	30.63
5	Buldhana	Prataprao Jadhav	SHS	5,21,977	46.56	Rajendra Shingne	NCP	3,88,690	34.67	1,33,287	11.89
6	Akola	Sanjay Dhotre	BJP	5,54,444	49.50	Prakash Ambedkar	VBA	2,78,848	24.89	2,75,596	24.61
7	Amravati	Navneet Rana	IND	5,10,947	45.87	Anandrao Adsul	SHS	4,73,996	42.55	36,951	3.32
8	Wardha	Ramdas Tadas	BJP	5,78,364	53.92	Charulata Rao Tokas	INC	3,91,173	36.47	1,87,191	17.45
9	Ramtek	Krupal Tumane	SHS	5,97,126	49.85	Kishore U. Gajbhiye	INC	4,70,343	39.27	1,26,783	10.58
10	Nagpur	Nitin Gadkari	BJP	6,60,221	55.61	Nana Patole	INC	4,44,212	37.42	2,16,009	18.19
11	Bhandara - Gondiya	Sunil Mendhe	BJP	6,50,243	52.16	Panchabudhe Jairam	NCP	4,52,849	36.33	1,97,394	15.83
12	Gadchiroli–Chimur	Ashok Nete	BJP	5,19,968	45.46	Namdeo D. Usendi	INC	4,42,442	38.68	77,526	6.78
13	Chandrapur	Suresh Dhanorkar	INC	5,59,507	45.14	Hansraj Ahir	BJP	5,14,744	41.53	44,763	3.61
14	Yavatmal–Washim	Bhavana Gawali	SHS	5,42,098	46.14	Manikrao Thakare	INC	4,24,159	36.10	1,17,939	10.04
15	Hingoli	Hemant Patil	SHS	5,86,312	50.60	Subhash Wankhede	INC	3,08,456	26.62	2,77,856	23.98
16	Nanded	Prataprao Chikhalikar	BJP	4,86,806	43.10	Ashok Chavan	INC	4,46,658	39.55	40,148	3.55
17	Parbhani	Sanjay Jadhav	SHS	5,38,941	43.01	Rajesh Vitekar	NCP	4,96,742	39.64	42,199	3.37
18	Jalna	Raosaheb Danve	BJP	6,98,019	57.73	Autade V. Keshavrao	INC	3,65,204	30.20	3,32,815	27.53
19	Aurangabad	Imtiyaz Jaleel	AIMIM	3,89,042	32.45	Chandrakant Khaire	SHS	3,84,550	32.08	4,492	0.37
20	Dindori	Bharati Pawar	BJP	5,67,470	49.83	Dhanraj Mahale	NCP	3,68,691	32.38	1,98,779	17.45
21	Nashik	Hemant Godse	SHS	5,63,599	50.23	Sameer Bhujbal	NCP	2,71,395	24.19	2,92,204	26.04
22	Palghar	Rajendra Gavit	SHS	5,80,479	48.28	Baliram Jadhav	BVA	4,91,596	40.89	88,883	7.39
23	Bhiwandi	Kapil Patil	BJP	5,23,583	52.07	Suresh Taware	INC	3,67,254	36.52	1,56,329	15.55
24	Kalyan	Shrikant Shinde	SHS	5,59,723	62.84	Babaji Balaram Patil	NCP	2,15,380	24.18	3,44,343	38.66
25	Thane	Rajan Vichare	SHS	7,40,969	63.28	Anand Paranjpe	NCP	3,28,824	28.08	4,12,145	35.20
26	Mumbai North	Gopal Shetty	BJP	7,06,678	71.38	Urmila Matondkar	INC	2,41,431	24.39	4,65,247	46.99
27	Mumbai North West	Gajanan Kirtikar	SHS	5,70,063	60.53	Sanjay Nirupam	INC	3,09,735	32.89	2,60,328	27.64
28	Mumbai North East	Manoj Kotak	BJP	5,14,599	56.60	Sanjay Patil	NCP	2,88,113	31.69	2,26,486	24.91
29	Mumbai North Central	Poonam Mahajan	BJP	4,86,672	53.97	Priya Dutt	INC	3,56,667	39.55	1,30,005	14.42
30	Mumbai South Central	Rahul Shewale	SHS	4,24,913	53.25	Eknath Gaikwad	INC	2,72,774	34.19	1,52,139	19.06
31	Mumbai South	Arvind Sawant	SHS	4,21,937	52.62	Milind Deora	INC	3,21,870	40.14	1,00,067	12.48
32	Raigad	Sunil Tatkare	NCP	4,86,968	47.39	Anant Geete	SHS	4,55,530	44.33	31,438	3.06
33	Maval	Shrirang Barne	SHS	7,20,663	52.62	Parth Ajit Pawar	NCP	5,04,750	36.86	2,15,913	15.76
34	Pune	Girish Bapat	BJP	6,32,835	61.10	Mohan Joshi	INC	3,08,207	29.76	3,24,628	31.34
35	Baramati	Supriya Sule	NCP	6,86,714	52.53	Kanchan Rahul Kool	BJP	5,30,940	40.61	1,55,774	11.92
36	Shirur	Amol Kolhe	NCP	6,35,830	49.17	Shivajirao Patil	SHS	5,77,347	44.65	58,483	4.52
37	Ahmadnagar	Sujay Vikhe Patil	BJP	7,04,660	58.43	Sangram Jagtap	NCP	4,23,186	35.09	2,81,474	23.34
38	Shirdi	Sadashiv Lokhande	SHS	4,86,820	47.24	Bhausaheb Kamble	INC	3,66,625	35.58	1,20,195	11.66
39	Beed	Pritam Munde	BJP	6,78,175	50.11	Bajrang Sonwane	NCP	5,09,807	37.67	1,68,368	12.44
40	Osmanabad	Omprakash Nimbalkar	SHS	5,96,640	49.52	Ranajagjitsinha Patil	NCP	4,69,074	38.93	1,27,566	10.59
41	Latur	Sudhakar Shrangare	BJP	6,61,495	56.15	K. M. Gunwantrao	INC	3,72,384	31.61	2,89,111	24.54
42	Solapur	Jaisidhesvar Swami	BJP	5,24,985	48.33	Sushilkumar Shinde	INC	3,66,377	33.73	1,58,608	14.60
43	Madha	Ranjit Naik-Nimbalkar	BJP	5,86,314	48.14	Sanjaymama Shinde	NCP	5,00,550	41.10	85,764	7.04
44	Sangli	Sanjaykaka Patil	BJP	5,08,995	42.68	Vishal Patil	SWP	3,44,643	28.90	1,64,352	13.78
45	Satara	Udayanraje Bhosale	NCP	5,79,026	51.80	Narendra A. Patil	SHS	4,52,498	40.48	1,26,528	11.32
46	Ratnagiri - Sindhudurg	Vinayak Raut	SHS	4,58,022	50.76	Nilesh Rane	MSHP	2,79,700	31.00	1,78,322	19.76
47	Kolhapur	Sanjay Mandlik	SHS	7,49,085	56.22	Dhananjay Mahadik	NCP	4,78,517	35.91	2,70,568	20.31
48	Hatkanangle	Dhairyasheel Mane	SHS	5,85,776	46.70	Raju Shetti	SWP	4,89,737	39.04	96,039	7.66

=== Region wise ===
==== National Democratic Alliance(NDA) ====
Region	Bharatiya Janata Party		Shiv Sena		Others
Region	Seats Won		Seats Won		Others
Western Maharashtra	05	▲01	03	▲01	0
Vidarbha	05	▼01	03	▼01	01
Marathwada	04	▲01	03	Steady	01
Thane+Konkan	01	▼01	05	Steady	0
Mumbai	03	Steady	03	Steady	0
North Maharashtra	05	Steady	01	Steady	0
Total	23	Steady	18	Steady	2

Region	Total seats	Bharatiya Janata Party		Shiv Sena		Others
Region	Total seats	Votes Polled		Votes Polled		Others
Western Maharashtra	11	57,29,824	▲16,76,372	36,12,425	▲15,90,274	0
Vidarbha	10	57,65,690	▼06,45,372	34,91,323	▼05,74,629	01
Marathwada	8	37,37,080	▲04,68,437	36,15,028	▲03,51,711	01
Thane+Konkan	7	10,05,172	▼14,48,510	55,32,746	▲17,70,339	0
Mumbai	6	28,00,536	▼01,46,921	25,40,358	▲95,066	0
North Maharashtra	6	56,85,655	▲13,38,732	11,21,232	▲01,83,827	0
Total	48	2,47,23,957	▲15,36,580	1,99,13,112	▲34,16,588	2

=== Seat Metrics ===
Alliance	Party	Seats Before	Retained	Gained	Lost	Seats Won	
NDA	BJP	23	22	▲01	▼01	23	41
NDA	Shiv Sena	18	14	▲04	▼04	18	41
UPA	INC	02	Steady	▲01	▼02	01	05
UPA	NCP	04	02	▲02	▼02	04	05

==== United Progressive Alliance(UPA) ====
Region	Total seats	Nationalist Congress Party				Indian National Congress			
Region	Total seats	Votes Polled		Seats Won		Votes Polled		Seats Won	
Western Maharashtra	11	37,13,279	▼06,69,866	03	▼01	00	Steady	0	Steady
Vidarbha	10	00	Steady	0	Steady	12,38,474	▲12,38,474	01	▲01
Marathwada	8	00	Steady	0	Steady	00	▼20,64,514	0	▼02
Thane+Konkan	7	10,25,467	▲10,25,467	01	▲01	00	Steady	0	Steady
Mumbai	6	00	Steady	0	Steady	00	Steady	0	Steady
North Maharashtra	6	00	Steady	0	Steady	00	Steady	0	Steady
Total	48	47,38,746	▲03,55,601	04	Steady	12,38,474	▼08,26,040	01	▼01

=== Results Analysis ===
No	Constituency	Category	Candidate	Political Party	Voting/Elected
1	Nandurbar	ST	Hina Gavit; K C Padavi; Sushil Antrulikar	BJP; INC; VBA	6,39,136 - Elected; 5,43,507; 25,702
2	Dhule	GEN	Subhash Bhambre; Kunal Patil; Nabi Ahamdulla	BJP; INC; VBA	6,13,533 - Elected; 3,84,29; 39,449
3	Jalgaon	GEN	Unmesh Patil; Galrao Devkar; Anjali Ratnakar Baviskar	BJP; NCP; VBA	7,13,874 - Elected; 3,02257; 37,366
4	Raver	GEN	Raksha Khadse; Dr.Ullas Patil; Nitin Kandelkar	BJP; INC; VBA	6,55,386 - Elected; 3,19,504; 88,365
5	Buldhana	GEN	Prataprao Jadhav; Rajendra Shingane; Baleram Shiraskar	SS; NCP; VBA	5,21,977 - Elected; 3,88,690; 1,72,627
6	Akola	GEN	Sanjay Dhotare; Prakash Ambedkar; Baraktulla Hidyatulla Patel	BJP; VBA; INC	5,54,579 - Elected; 2,78,848; 2,54,370
7	Amravati	SC	Navneet kaur; Anadrao Adsul; Gunvant Devpare	IND (NCP); SS; VBA	5,10,947 - Elected; 4,73,996; 65,135
8	Wardha	GEN	Ramdas Tadas; Carulata Tokas; Dhanaraj Vanjari	BJP; INC; VBA	5,78,364 - Elected; 3,91,173; 36,452
9	Ramtek	SC	Krupal Tumane; Kishor Gajbhiye; Subhash Gajbhiye	SS; INC; BSP	5,97,126 - Elected; 4,70,343; 44,327
10	Nagpur	GEN	Nitin Gadkari; Nana Patole; Mohammad Jamal	BJP; INC; BSP	6,60,221 - Elected; 4,44,212; 31,725
11	Bhandara-Gondiya	GEN	Sunil Mendhe; Nana Panchbuddhe; Dr.Vijaya Rajesh Nandurkar	BJP; NCP; BSP	6,50,243 - Elected; 4,52,849; 52,659
12	Gadchiroli-Chimur	ST	Ashok Nete; Dr.Namadev Usendi; Dr.Rameshkumar Gajabe	BJP; INC; VBA	5,19,968 - Elected; 4,42,442; 1,11,468
13	Chandrapur-Wani-Arni	GEN	Suresh Dhanorkar; Hansraj Ahir; Rajendra Mahadole	INC; BJP; VBA	5,59,507 - Elected; 5,14,744; 1,12,079
14	Yavatmal-Washim	GEN	Bhavana Gavali; Manikrao Thakre; Pravin Pawar	SS; INC; VBA	5,42,098 - Elected; 4,24,159; 94,228
15	Hingoli	GEN	Hemant Patil; Subhash Wankhede; Mohan Rathod	SS; INC; VBA	5,86,312 - Elected; 3,08,456; 1,74,051
16	Nanded	GEN	Prataprao Patil Chikalikar; Ashok Chavan; Yashpal Bhinge	BJP; INC; VBA	4,86,806 - Elected; 4,46,658; 1,66,196
17	Parbhani	GEN	Sanjay Jadhav; Rajesh Vitekar; Alamgir Khan	SS; NCP; VBA	5,38,941 - Elected; 4,96,742; 1,49,946
18	Jalna	GEN	Raosaheb Danave; Vilas Avatade; Sharadchandra Wankhede	BJP; INC; VBA	6,98,019 - Elected; 3,65,204; 77,158
19	Aurangabad	GEN	Imtiyaj Jalil; Chandrakant Khaire; Harshawardhan Jadhav	AIMIM; SS; IND	3,89,042 - Elected; 3,84,550; 2,83,798
20	Dindori	ST	Bharti Pawar; dhanaraj Mahale; Jiwa Gavit	BJP; NCP; CPI(M)	5,67,470 - Elected; 3,68,691; 1,09,570
21	Nashik	GEN	Hemant Godase; Sameer Bhujbal; Manikrao Kokate	SS; NCP; IND	5,63,599 - Elected; 2,71,395; 1,34,527
22	Palaghar	ST	Rajendra Gavit; Baliram Jadhav; NOTA	SS; BVA; NOTA	5,80,479 - Elected; 4,91,596; 29479
23	Bhiwandi	GEN	Kapil Patil; Suresh Tavare; Arun Savant	BJP; INC; VBA	5,23,583 - Elected; 3,67,254; 51,455
24	Kalyan	GEN	Shrikant Shinde; Babaji Patil; Sanjay Hedaoo	SS; NCP; VBA	5,59,723 - Elected; 2,15,380; 65,572
25	Thane	GEN	Rajan Vichare; Anand Paranjape; Malikaarjun Pujari	SS; NCP; VBA	7,40,969 - Elected; 3,28,824; 47,432
26	Mumbai North	GEN	Gopal Shetty; Urmila Matondkar	BJP; INC	7,06,678 - Elected; 2,41,431
27	Mumbai North-West	GEN	Gajanan Kirtikar; Sanjay Nirupam; Suresh Shetty	SS; INC; VBA	5,70,063 - Elected; 3,09,735; 23,422
28	Mumbai North-East	GEN	Manoj Kotak; Sanjay Dina Patil; Niharika Khondale	BJP; NCP; VBA	5,14,599 - Elected; 2,88,113; 68,239
29	Mumbai North Central	GEN	Poonam Mahajan; Priya Dutt; Abdur Rehman	BJP; INC; VBA	4,86,672 - Elected; 3,56,667; 33,703
30	Mumbai South Central	GEN	Rahul Shewale; Eknath Gaikwad; Sanjay Bhosale	SS; INC; VBA	4,24,913 - Elected; 2,72,774; 63,412
31	Mumbai South	GEN	Arvind Sawant; Milind Devra; Anil Kumar	SS; INC; VBA	4,21,937 - Elected; 3,21,870; 30,348
32	Raigad	GEN	Sunil Tatkare; Anant Gite; Suman Koli	NCP; SS; VBA	4,86,968 - Elected; 4,55,530; 23,196
33	Maval	GEN	Shrirang Barne; Parth Pawar; Rajaram Patil	SS; NCP; VBA	7,20,663 - Elected; 5,04750; 75,904
34	Pune	GEN	Girish Bapat; Mohan Joshi; Anil Jadhav	BJP; INC; VBA	6,32,835 - Elected; 3,08,207; 64,793
35	Baramati	GEN	Supriya Sule; Kanchan Kul; Navnath Padalkar	NCP; BJP; VBA	6,86,714 - Elected; 5,30,940; 44,134
36	Shirur	GEN	Amol Kholle; Shivajirao Adhalrao Patil; Rahul Ohal	NCP; SS; VBA	6,35,830 - Elected; 5,77,347; 38,076
37	Ahmednagar	GEN	Sujay Vikhe; Sangram Jagtap; Sudhakar Avhad	BJP; NCP; VBA	7,04,660 - Elected; 4,23,186; 31,807
38	Shirdi	SC	Sadashiv Lokhande; Bahusaheb Kamble; Sanjay Sukhadan	SS; INC; VBA	4,86,820 - Elected; 3,66,625; 63,287
39	Beed	GEN	Dr.Pritam Munde; Bajarang Sonone; Vishnu Jadhav	BJP; NCP; VBA	6,78,175 - Elected; 5,09,807; 92,139
40	Osmanabad	GEN	Om Raje Nimbalkar; Ranajagjit Siha Patil; Arun Salgar	SS; NCP; VBA	5,96,640 - Elected; 4,69,074; 98,579
41	Latur	SC	Sudhakar Shrunghare; Machindra Kamat; Ram Garkar	BJP; INC; VBA	6,61,495 - Elected; 3,72,384; 1,12,255
42	Solapur	SC	Jaysiddheshwar Swami; Sushilkumar Shinde; Prakash Ambedkar	BJP; INC; VBA	5,24,985 - Elected; 3,66,377; 1,70,007
43	Madha	GEN	Ranjitsinh Niak Nimbalkar; Sanjay Shinde; Vijayrao More	BJP; NCP; VBA	5,86,314 - Elected; 5,00,550; 51,532
44	Sangli	GEN	Sanjay Patil; Vishal Patil; Gopichand Padalkar	BJP; SWP; VBA	5,08,995 - Elected; 3,44,643; 3,00,234
45	Satara	GEN	Udayanraje Bhosle; Narendra Patil; Sahadev Yevale	NCP; SS; VBA	5,79,026 - Elected; 4,52,498; 40,673
46	Ratnagiri-Sindhudurg	GEN	Vinayak Raut; Nitesh Rane; Navinchandra Bandivadekar	SS; MSP; INC	4,58,022 - Elected; 2,79,700; 63,299
47	Kolhapur	GEN	Sanjay Mandalik; Dhanajay Mahadik; Aruna Mali	SS; NCP; VBA	7,49,085 - Elected; 4,78,517; 63,439
48	Hatkanangle	GEN	Dhairyashil Mane; Raju Shetty; Aslam Sayyed	SS; SWP; VBA	5,85,776 - Elected; 4,89,737; 1,23,419

1. www.Elections.in>maharashtra

Maharashtra Lok Sabha Election Results 2019 - Constituency Wise And Party Wise Result.

2. www.indiatoday.in

Maharashtra Lok Sabha Election Result 2019 - BJP - Shiv Sena alliance wins 41 out of 48.

== Post-election Union Council of Ministers from Maharashtra ==
#	Name	Constituency	Designation	Department	From	To	Party
1	Nitin Gadkari	Nagpur	Cabinet Minister	Ministry of Road Transport and Highways	31 May 2019	9 June 2024	BJP
1	Nitin Gadkari	Nagpur	Cabinet Minister	Ministry of Micro, Small and Medium Enterprises	31 May 2019	7 July 2021	BJP
2	Piyush Goyal	Rajya Sabha	Cabinet Minister	Ministry of Railways	31 May 2019	7 July 2021	BJP
2	Piyush Goyal	Rajya Sabha	Cabinet Minister	Ministry of Commerce and Industry	31 May 2019	9 June 2024	BJP
2	Piyush Goyal	Rajya Sabha	Cabinet Minister	Ministry of Consumer Affairs, Food and Public Distribution	9 Oct 2020	9 June 2024	BJP
2	Piyush Goyal	Rajya Sabha	Cabinet Minister	Ministry of Textiles	7 July 2021	9 June 2024	BJP
3	Prakash Javadekar	Rajya Sabha	Cabinet Minister	Ministry of Environment, Forest and Climate Change; Ministry of Information and Broadcasting	31 May 2019	7 July 2021	BJP
3	Prakash Javadekar	Rajya Sabha	Cabinet Minister	Ministry of Heavy Industries and Public Enterprises	12 Nov 2019	7 July 2021	BJP
4	Arvind Sawant	Mumbai South	Cabinet Minister	Ministry of Heavy Industries and Public Enterprises	31 May 2019	12 Nov 2019	SS
5	Narayan Rane	Rajya Sabha	Cabinet Minister	Ministry of Micro, Small and Medium Enterprises	7 July 2021	9 June 2024	BJP
6	Raosaheb Danve	Jalna	MoS	Ministry of Consumer Affairs, Food and Public Distribution	31 May 2019	7 July 2021	BJP
6	Raosaheb Danve	Jalna	MoS	Ministry of Railways; Ministry of Coal; Ministry of Mines	7 July 2021	9 June 2024	BJP
7	Ramdas Athawale	Rajya Sabha	MoS	Ministry of Social Justice and Empowerment	31 May 2019	9 June 2024	RPI(A)
8	Sanjay Dhotre	Akola	MoS	Ministry of Education; Ministry of Communications; Ministry of Electronics and Information Technology	31 May 2019	7 July 2021	BJP
9	V. Muraleedharan	Rajya Sabha	MoS	Ministry of External Affairs; Ministry of Parliamentary Affairs	31 May 2019	9 June 2024	BJP
10	Bhagwat Karad	Rajya Sabha	MoS	Ministry of Finance	7 July 2021	9 June 2024	BJP
11	Bharati Pawar	Dindori	MoS	Ministry of Health and Family Welfare	7 July 2021	9 June 2024	BJP
11	Bharati Pawar	Dindori	MoS	Ministry of Tribal Affairs	7 Dec 2023	9 June 2024	BJP
12	Kapil Patil	Bhiwandi	MoS	Ministry of Panchayati Raj	7 July 2021	9 June 2024	BJP

== Assembly segments wise lead of Parties ==
Party	Assembly segments	Position in Assembly (as of 2019 election)
Bharatiya Janata Party	122	105
Shiv Sena	105	56
Nationalist Congress Party	23	53
Indian National Congress	22	45
Swabhimani Paksha	4	1
Bahujan Vikas Aaghadi	3	3
All India Majlis-e-Ittehadul Muslimeen	2	2
Maharashtra Swabhimana Paksha	2	0
Others	7	23
Total	288	

== Region wise winner ==
=== Western Maharashtra ===
Sr.no	Constituency	Winner	Party
1.	Pune	Girish Bapat	Bharatiya Janata Party
2.	Solapur	Jaisidhesvar Swami	Bharatiya Janata Party
3.	Sangli	Sanjaykaka Patil	Bharatiya Janata Party
4.	Baramati	Supriya Sule	Nationalist Congress Party
5.	Madha	Ranjit Naik-Nimbalkar	Bharatiya Janata Party
6.	Satara	Shriniwas Patil	Nationalist Congress Party
7.	Maval	Shrirang Chandu Barne	Shiv Sena
8.	Shirur	Amol Kolhe	Nationalist Congress Party
9.	Ahmednagar	Sujay Vikhe Patil	Bharatiya Janata Party
10.	Kolhapur	Sanjay Mandlik	Shiv Sena
11.	Hatkanangle	Dhairyashil Mane	Shiv Sena
12.	Shirdi	Sadashiv Lokhande	Shiv Sena

=== Vidarbha ===
Sr.no	Constituency	Winner	Party
1.	Wardha	Ramdas Tadas	Bharatiya Janata Party
2.	Ramtek	Krupal Tumane	Shiv Sena
3.	Nagpur	Nitin Gadkari	Bharatiya Janata Party
4.	Gadchiroli-Chimur	Ashok Nete	Bharatiya Janata Party
5.	Bhandara-Gondiya	Sunil Baburao Mendhe	Bharatiya Janata Party
6.	Buldhana	Prataprao Ganpatrao Jadhav	Shiv Sena
7.	Amravati	Navnit Ravi Rana	Independent
8.	Yavatmal-Washim	Bhavana Gawali	Shiv Sena
9.	Akola	Sanjay Shamrao Dhotre	Bharatiya Janata Party
10.	Chandrapur	Suresh Dhanorkar	Indian National Congress

=== Marathwada ===
Sr.no	Constituency	Winner	Party
1.	Nanded	Prataprao Govindrao Chikhalikar	Bharatiya Janata Party
2.	Latur	Sudhakar Bhalerao Shrungare	Bharatiya Janata Party
3.	Osmanabad	Omraje Nimbalkar	Shiv Sena
4.	Hingoli	Hemant Sriram Patil	Shiv Sena
5.	Parbhani	Sanjay Haribhau Jadhav	Shiv Sena
6.	Aurangabad	Imtiyaz Jaleel	AIMIM
7.	Jalna	Raosaheb Danve	Bharatiya Janata Party
8.	Beed	Pritam Munde	Bharatiya Janata Party

=== Thane+Konkan ===
Sr.no	Constituency	Winner	Party
1.	Bhiwandi	Kapil Moreshwar Patil	Bharatiya Janata Party
2.	Ratnagiri-Sindhudurg	Vinayak Raut	Shiv Sena
3.	Thane	Rajan Vichare	Shiv Sena
4.	Kalyan	Shrikant Shinde	Shiv Sena
5.	Raigad	Sunil Tatkare	Nationalist Congress Party
6.	Palghar	Rajendra Gavit	Shiv Sena
7.	Mumbai North	Gopal Shetty	Bharatiya Janata Party
8.	Mumbai North West	Gajanan Kirtikar	Shiv Sena
9.	Mumbai North East	Manoj Kotak	Bharatiya Janata Party
10.	Mumbai North Central	Poonam Mahajan	Bharatiya Janata Party
11.	Mumbai South Central	Rahul Shewale	Shiv Sena
12.	Mumbai South	Arvind Sawant	Shiv Sena

=== North Maharashtra ===
Sr.no	Constituency	Winner	Party
1.	Nandurbar	Heena Vijaykumar Gavit	Bharatiya Janata Party
2.	Dhule	Subhash Ramrao Bhamre	Bharatiya Janata Party
3.	Jalgaon	Unmesh Patil	Bharatiya Janata Party
4.	Raver	Raksha Nikhil Khadase	Bharatiya Janata Party
5.	Nashik	Hemant Tukaram Godse	Shiv Sena
6.	Dindori	Bharati Pawar	Bharatiya Janata Party
