= Shirala Assembly constituency =

Constituency of the Maharashtra legislative assembly in India

Coordinates: 16.98°N 74.13°E

Shirala
- Constituency No. 284 for the Maharashtra Legislative Assembly

Constituency details
- Country: India
- Region: Western India
- State: Maharashtra
- District: Sangli
- Lok Sabha constituency: Karad. Hatkanangle
- Established: 1952
- Total electors: 308,131
- Reservation: None

Member of Legislative Assembly
- 15th Maharashtra Legislative Assembly
- Incumbent Satyajit Shivajirao Deshmukh
- Party: BJP
- Alliance: NDA
- Elected year: 2024

Shirala Assembly constituency is one of the 288 Vidhan Sabha (legislative assembly) constituencies of Maharashtra state in western India.

== Overview ==
Shirala (constituency number 284) is one of the eight Vidhan Sabha constituencies located in Sangli district. It covers the entire Shirala tehsil and part of the Walwa tehsil of this district.

Shirala is part of Hatkanangle Lok Sabha constituency along with five other Vidhan Sabha constituencies, namely Islampur in Sangli district and Shahuwadi, Hatkanangale, Ichalkaranji and Shirol in Kolhapur district.

== Members of Legislative Assembly ==
Year	Member	Party
From 1952 - 1957 known as : Shirala Walva
1952	Babar Sarojini Krishnarao	Indian National Congress
1957	Yashavant Patil	Peasants and Workers Party
1962	Vasantrao Anandrao Naik alias Baba Naik	Indian National Congress
1967	Vasantrao Anandrao Naik alias Baba Naik	Indian National Congress
1972	Bhagwanrao Patil	Indian National Congress
1978	Shivajirao Deshmukh	Independent
1980	Shivajirao Deshmukh	Indian National Congress
1985	Shivajirao Deshmukh	Indian National Congress
1990	Shivajirao Deshmukh	Indian National Congress
1995	Shivajirao Yashwantrao Naik	Independent politician
1999	Shivajirao Yashwantrao Naik	Nationalist Congress Party
2004	Shivajirao Yashwantrao Naik	Independent
2009	Mansing Naik	Independent
2014	Shivajirao Yashwantrao Naik	Bharatiya Janata Party
2019	Mansing Naik	Nationalist Congress Party
2024	Satyajit Deshmukh	Bharatiya Janata Party

== Election results ==
=== Assembly Election 2024 ===
2024 Maharashtra Legislative Assembly election : Shirala
Party	Candidate	Votes	%	±%
BJP	Satyajit Shivajirao Deshmukh	130,738	53.76%	▲20.41
NCP-SP	Mansing Fattesingrao Naik	108,049	44.43%	New
Independent	Anil Rangrao Alugade	2,265	0.93%	New
NOTA	None of the Above	664	0.27%	▼0.35
Margin of victory		22,689	9.33%	▼2.05
Turnout		243,850	79.14%	▲1.15
Total valid votes		243,186		
Registered electors		308,131		
BJP gain from NCP		Swing	▲9.03	

=== Assembly Election 2019 ===
2019 Maharashtra Legislative Assembly election : Shirala
Party	Candidate	Votes	%	±%
NCP	Mansing Fattesingrao Naik	101,933	44.73%	▲7.20
BJP	Shivajirao Yashwantrao Naik	76,002	33.35%	▼5.86
Independent	Samarat(Baba) Nanasaheb Mahadik	46,239	20.29%	New
NOTA	None of the Above	1,417	0.62%	▲0.26
Margin of victory		25,931	11.38%	▲9.70
Turnout		229,555		▼0.90
Total valid votes		227,861		
Registered electors		292,965		
NCP gain from BJP		Swing	▲5.52	

=== Assembly Election 2014 ===
2014 Maharashtra Legislative Assembly election : Shirala
Party	Candidate	Votes	%	±%
BJP	Shivajirao Yashwantrao Naik	85,363	39.22%	New
NCP	Mansing Fattesingrao Naik	81,695	37.53%	New
INC	Satyajit Shivajirao Deshmukh	45,135	20.74%	▼19.61
SS	Nandkishor Ramchandra Nilkanth	2,061	0.95%	▼0.64
NOTA	None of the Above	795	0.37%	New
Margin of victory		3,668	1.69%	▼11.65
Turnout		218,473		▲1.21
Total valid votes		217,669		
Registered electors		276,659		
BJP gain from Independent		Swing	▼14.47	

=== Assembly Election 2009 ===
2009 Maharashtra Legislative Assembly election : Shirala
Party	Candidate	Votes	%	±%
Independent	Mansing Fattesingrao Naik	104,303	53.68%	New
INC	Shivajirao Yashwantrao Naik	78,385	40.34%	New
Independent	Sawant Tanaji Akaram (Fighter)	3,546	1.83%	New
SS	D.B.Patil (Sir)	3,076	1.58%	New
Independent	Patil Mohan Bandu	2,433	1.25%	New
Independent	Anandrao Vasantrao Sarnaik (Fauji Bapu)	1,688	0.87%	New
Margin of victory		25,918	13.34%	▲7.59
Turnout		194,380	77.50%	▼4.77
Total valid votes		194,292		
Registered electors		250,806		▲25.34
Independent hold		Swing	▲13.75	

=== Assembly Election 2004 ===
2004 Maharashtra Legislative Assembly election : Shirala
Party	Candidate	Votes	%	±%
Independent	Shivajirao Yashwantrao Naik	65,717	39.94%	New
NCP	Mansing Fattesingrao Naik	56,256	34.19%	▼16.95
Independent	Satyajit Shivajirao Deshmukh	38,050	23.12%	New
Independent	Shivaji Damu Naik	1,694	1.03%	New
Independent	Karande Suhas Shamrao	1,193	0.72%	New
Independent	Nangare Nandkumar Chintamani	1,051	0.64%	New
Margin of victory		9,461	5.75%	▲1.32
Turnout		164,656	82.28%	▲3.62
Total valid votes		164,556		
Registered electors		200,105		▲21.21
Independent gain from NCP		Swing	▼11.20	

=== Assembly Election 1999 ===
1999 Maharashtra Legislative Assembly election : Shirala
Party	Candidate	Votes	%	±%
NCP	Shivajirao Yashwantrao Naik	66,365	51.14%	New
INC	Satyajit Shivajirao Deshmukh	60,619	46.71%	▲5.77
SS	Arvind Aba Pawar	2,794	2.15%	▼0.80
Margin of victory		5,746	4.43%	▼8.77
Turnout		132,891	80.50%	▼4.10
Total valid votes		129,778		
Registered electors		165,084		▲1.47
NCP gain from Independent		Swing	▼3.00	

=== Assembly Election 1995 ===
1995 Maharashtra Legislative Assembly election : Shirala
Party	Candidate	Votes	%	±%
Independent	Shivajirao Yashwantrao Naik	72,856	54.14%	New
INC	Charapale Shankarrao Nana	55,099	40.94%	▼9.16
SS	Patil Lalaso Sakharam	3,980	2.96%	▼13.73
Independent	Sarnaik Anandrao Vasantrao (Bapu)	1,373	1.02%	New
Margin of victory		17,757	13.19%	▼7.65
Turnout		137,072	84.25%	▲9.72
Total valid votes		134,579		
Registered electors		162,697		▲5.49
Independent gain from INC		Swing	▲4.03	

=== Assembly Election 1990 ===
1990 Maharashtra Legislative Assembly election : Shirala
Party	Candidate	Votes	%	±%
INC	Shivajirao Bapusaheb Deshmukh	56,404	50.10%	▼13.37
Independent	Fattesing Anandrao Naik	32,938	29.26%	New
SS	Naik Shobhabtai Diliprao	18,783	16.68%	New
Independent	Patil Shivajirao Dattartraya	2,001	1.78%	New
CPI	Patankar Indumati Babuji	1,561	1.39%	New
Margin of victory		23,466	20.84%	▼6.10
Turnout		114,265	74.09%	▲1.48
Total valid votes		112,580		
Registered electors		154,223		▲18.11
INC hold		Swing	▼13.37	

=== Assembly Election 1985 ===
1985 Maharashtra Legislative Assembly election : Shirala
Party	Candidate	Votes	%	±%
INC	Shivajirao Bapusaheb Deshmukh	59,271	63.47%	New
IC(S)	Chavan Narayan Pandurang	34,114	36.53%	New
Margin of victory		25,157	26.94%	▼4.79
Turnout		95,157	72.88%	▲1.82
Total valid votes		93,385		
Registered electors		130,574		▲9.61
INC gain from INC(I)		Swing	▼2.02	

=== Assembly Election 1980 ===
1980 Maharashtra Legislative Assembly election : Shirala
Party	Candidate	Votes	%	±%
INC(I)	Shivajirao Bapusaheb Deshmukh	54,379	65.49%	▲63.59
INC(U)	Fattesing Anandrao Naik	28,032	33.76%	New
Independent	Pawar Prakash Bhidu	619	0.75%	New
Margin of victory		26,347	31.73%	▲14.02
Turnout		84,509	70.94%	▼6.21
Total valid votes		83,030		
Registered electors		119,126		▲8.25
INC(I) gain from Independent		Swing	▲14.17	

=== Assembly Election 1978 ===
1978 Maharashtra Legislative Assembly election : Shirala
Party	Candidate	Votes	%	±%
Independent	Shivajirao Bapusaheb Deshmukh	42,871	51.32%	New
INC	Patil Rajaram Yashwant	28,076	33.61%	▼34.81
JP	Patil Narayan Tukaram	6,951	8.32%	New
PWPI	Patil Hambirrao Krishna	2,866	3.43%	▼23.02
INC(I)	Jadhav Kashinath Alia Raj Dadu	1,591	1.90%	New
Independent	Dalavi Vithal Bhau	1,178	1.41%	New
Margin of victory		14,795	17.71%	▼24.26
Turnout		85,275	77.49%	▲10.02
Total valid votes		83,533		
Registered electors		110,048		▲11.31
Independent gain from INC		Swing	▼17.10	

=== Assembly Election 1972 ===
1972 Maharashtra Legislative Assembly election : Shirala
Party	Candidate	Votes	%	±%
INC	Bhagawanrao Patil	44,567	68.42%	▲2.25
PWPI	Yeshwant Chandroji Patil	17,228	26.45%	▲8.42
RPI	Bansore Rangarao Bhiva	3,341	5.13%	New
Margin of victory		27,339	41.97%	▼6.17
Turnout		67,107	67.88%	▼0.11
Total valid votes		65,136		
Registered electors		98,866		▲15.72
INC hold		Swing	▲2.25	

=== Assembly Election 1967 ===
1967 Maharashtra Legislative Assembly election : Shirala
Party	Candidate	Votes	%	±%
INC	Vasantrao Anandrao Naik	37,304	66.17%	▼1.83
PWPI	Yeshwant Chandroji Patil	10,164	18.03%	▼4.57
Independent	S. N. Patil	6,191	10.98%	New
Independent	V. B. Dalavi	1,882	3.34%	New
Independent	S. G. Gosavi	580	1.03%	New
Margin of victory		27,140	48.14%	▲2.74
Turnout		59,454	69.59%	▼4.16
Total valid votes		56,378		
Registered electors		85,432		▲13.62
INC hold		Swing	▼1.83	

=== Assembly Election 1962 ===
1962 Maharashtra Legislative Assembly election : Shirala
Party	Candidate	Votes	%	±%
INC	Vasantrao Anandrao Naik	35,864	67.99%	▲18.86
PWPI	Yeshwant Chandroji Patil	11,919	22.60%	▼28.27
Independent	Laxmanrao Keshavrao Deshmukh	4,963	9.41%	New
Margin of victory		23,945	45.40%	▲43.66
Turnout		55,006	73.16%	▲0.69
Total valid votes		52,746		
Registered electors		75,191		▲13.87
INC gain from PWPI		Swing	▲17.13	

=== Assembly Election 1957 ===
1957 Bombay State Legislative Assembly election : Shirala
Party	Candidate	Votes	%	±%
PWPI	Yeshwant Chandroji Patil	23,332	50.87%	▲18.85
INC	Rajarambapu Patil	22,536	49.13%	▲12.71
Margin of victory		796	1.74%	▼2.67
Turnout		45,868	69.46%	▲11.82
Total valid votes		45,868		
Registered electors		66,032		▲25.29
PWPI gain from INC		Swing	▲14.45	

=== Assembly Election 1952 ===
1952 Bombay State Legislative Assembly election : Shirala Walva
Party	Candidate	Votes	%	±%
INC	Sarojini Krishnarao Babar	11,066	36.42%	New
PWPI	Yeshwant Chandroji Patil	9,727	32.01%	New
Independent	Patil Gajanan Balajee	3,974	13.08%	New
Independent	Patankar Babuji Bala	3,231	10.63%	New
Independent	Mohite Mahadeo Tukaram	1,807	5.95%	New
Independent	Mahind Vishnu Bhau	578	1.90%	New
Margin of victory		1,339	4.41%	
Turnout		30,383	57.65%	
Total valid votes		30,383		
Registered electors		52,705		
INC win (new seat)				
