= Hatkanangle Lok Sabha constituency =

Lok Sabha constituency in Maharashtra

Coordinates: 16.7°N 74.4°E

Hatkanangle
- Lok Sabha constituency
- Hatkanangle Lok Sabha Constituency map

Constituency details
- Country: India
- Region: Western India
- State: Maharashtra
- Assembly constituencies: Shahuwadi; Hatkanangle; Ichalkaranji; Shirol; Islampur; Shirala
- Established: 1952
- Reservation: None

Member of Parliament
- 18th Lok Sabha
- Incumbent Dhairyasheel Sambhajirao Mane
- Party: SHS
- Alliance: NDA
- Elected year: 2024
- Preceded by: Raju Shetti

Hatkanangle Lok Sabha constituency is one of the 48 Lok Sabha (parliamentary) constituencies in Maharashtra state in western India. This constituency was dissolved as a part of the implementation of delimitation in 1976. This constituency again came into existence in 2008 as a part of the implementation of delimitation of parliamentary constituencies based on the recommendations of the Delimitation Commission of India constituted on 12 July 2002. Vidhan Sabha segments from Sangli and Kolhapur districts have formed this new constituency.

As of 2024, the eligible voters are 18,14,277.

== Assembly segments ==
After the 2008 delimitation, Hatkanangle Lok Sabha constituency comprises six Vidhan Sabha (legislative assembly) segments. These segments are:

| # | Name | District | Member | Party | Leading (in 2024) |
|---|---|---|---|---|---|
| 277 | Shahuwadi | Kolhapur | Vinay Kore | JSS | SS(UBT) |
| 278 | Hatkanangle (SC) | Kolhapur | Ashokrao Mane | JSS | SHS |
| 279 | Ichalkaranji | Kolhapur | Rahul Awade | BJP | SHS |
| 280 | Shirol | Kolhapur | Rajendra Patil Yadravkar | RSVA | SHS |
| 283 | Islampur | Sangli | Jayant Patil | NCP-SP | SS(UBT) |
| 284 | Shirala | Sangli | Satyajit Deshmukh | BJP | SS(UBT) |

== Members of Parliament ==
| Year | Name | Party |
|---|---|---|
| 1962 | Krishnaji Laxman More | Indian National Congress |
| 1967 | M. V. R. C. Bhosale | Peasants and Workers Party of India |
| 1971 | Dattatray Baburao Kadam | Indian National Congress |
1977-2004 : See Ichalkaranji
| 2009 | Raju Shetti | Swabhimani Paksha |
| 2014 | Raju Shetti | Swabhimani Paksha |
| 2019 | Dhairyasheel Sambhajirao Mane | Shiv Sena |
| 2024 | Dhairyasheel Sambhajirao Mane | Shiv Sena |

== Election results ==
=== 2024 ===
2024 Indian general elections: Hatkanangale
| Party | Candidate | Votes | % | ±% |
|---|---|---|---|---|
| SHS | Dhairyasheel Sambhajirao Mane | 520,190 | 40.14 | ▼6.64 |
| SS(UBT) | Satyajeet Babasaheb Patil Sarudkar | 5,06,764 | 39.10 | New |
| SWP | Raju Shetti | 1,79,850 | 13.88 | ▼25.23 |
| VBA | Dadasaheb alias Dadgonda Chavgonda Patil | 32,696 | 2.52 | ▼7.34 |
| Independent | Aslam Ainodin Mulla | 6,111 | 0.47 | |
| NOTA | None of the Above | 5,103 | 0.39 | N/A |
| Majority | | 13,426 | 1.04 | ▼6.63 |
| Turnout | | 12,97,282 | 71.34 | ▲0.74 |
| SS gain from SS | | Swing | | |

=== 2019 ===
2019 Indian general elections: Hatkanangle
| Party | Candidate | Votes | % | ±% |
|---|---|---|---|---|
| SS | Dhairyasheel Sambhajirao Mane | 585,776 | 46.78 | +46.78 |
| SWP | Raju Shetti | 4,89,737 | 39.11 | −14.69 |
| VBA | Aslam Badshahji Sayyad | 1,23,419 | 9.86 | +9.86 |
| IND. | Sangramsinh Jaisinghrao Gaikwad | 8,695 | 0.69 | |
| Majority | | 96,039 | 7.67 | −7.27 |
| Turnout | | 12,54,313 | 70.60 | −2.40 |
| SS gain from SWP | | Swing | | |

=== General elections 2014 ===
2014 Indian general elections: Hatkanangle
| Party | Candidate | Votes | % | ±% |
|---|---|---|---|---|
| SWP | Raju Shetti | 640,428 | 53.80 | +4.63 |
| INC | Kallappa Awade | 4,62,618 | 38.86 | +38.86 |
| IND. | Sureshdada Patil | 25,648 | 2.15 | N/A |
| BSP | Chandrakant Kamble | 11,499 | 0.97 | N/A |
| AAP | Raghunath Patil | 9,015 | 0.76 | New |
| NOTA | None of the Above | 10,059 | 0.85 | N/A |
| Majority | | 1,77,810 | 14.94 | +5.23 |
| Turnout | | 11,90,332 | 73.00 | +5.93 |
| SWP gain from INC | | Swing | | |

=== General elections 2009 ===
2009 Indian general elections: Hatkanangle
| Party | Candidate | Votes | % | ±% |
|---|---|---|---|---|
| SWP | Raju Shetti | 481,025 | 49.17 | |
| NCP | Nivedita Mane | 3,85,965 | 39.46 | |
| SS | Raghunath Patil | 55,050 | 5.63 | |
| BSP | Anilkumar Janade | 27,465 | 2.81 | |
| IND. | Anandrai Surnike | 10,576 | 1.08 | |
| Majority | | 95,060 | 9.71 | |
| Turnout | | 9,78,202 | 67.07 | N/A |
| SWP gain from NCP | | Swing | | |

== See also ==
- Ichalkaranji Lok Sabha constituency
- Kolhapur district
- Sangli district
- List of constituencies of the Lok Sabha
