= Sujit =

Sujit may refer to:

- Sujit Bose (cricketer), Indian cricketer
- Sujit Guha, Bengali filmmaker
- Sujit Kumar, Indian actor
- Sujit Minchekar, Sri Lankan politician
- Sujit Mukherjee, Indian writer
- Sujit Nayak, Indian cricketer
- Sujit Roy, Indian cricketer
- Sujit Minchekar, Indian politician
