= Raju Awale =

Indian politician

Member of Maharashtra Legislative Assembly
- In office 2019–2024
- Preceded by: Sujit Minchekar
- Succeeded by: Ashokrao Mane
- Constituency: Hatkanangale Assembly constituency

Personal details
- Born: 26 June 1974 (age 51) Ichalkaranji
- Party: Indian National Congress
- Parent: Jaywantrao Awale (father)
- Occupation: Politician

Raju Jaywantrao Awale is a leader of Indian National Congress and a member of the Maharashtra Legislative Assembly elected from Hatkanangale Assembly constituency in Ichalkaranji, Kolhapur city. He lost in 2024 Assembly Elections.

== Positions held ==
- 2019: Elected to Maharashtra Legislative Assembly.
- Vice-chairman: Kolhapur District Central Cooperative Bank (KDCC).
