= Suresh Ganpati Halvankar =

Indian politician

Member of Maharashtra Legislative Assembly
- In office 2009–2019
- Preceded by: Prakashanna Awade
- Succeeded by: Prakashanna Awade
- Constituency: Ichalkaranji

Personal details
- Born: 2 June 1962 (age 64)
- Party: Bharatiya Janata Party
- Occupation: Politician
- Website: sureshhalwankar.com

Suresh Ganpati Halwankar is an Indian politician and member of the Bharatiya Janata Party. He is a two term member of the Maharashtra Legislative Assembly.

== Constituency ==
Suresh Ganpati Halwankar was elected twice from the Ichalkaranji assembly constituency, Maharashtra.

== Positions held ==
- Maharashtra Legislative Assembly MLA.
- General Secretary, BJP Maharashtra
- Terms in office: 2009-2014 and 2014–2019.
