= Mansing Fattesingrao Naik =

Indian politician

Member of Maharashtra Legislative Assembly
- In office (2009-2014), (2019 – 2024)
- Preceded by: Shivajirao Yashwantrao Naik
- Succeeded by: Satyajit Shivajirao Deshmukh
- Constituency: Shirala

Personal details
- Party: Nationalist Congress Party
- Spouse: Sunita Naik
- Children: Sharmila, Monalisa, Pallavi, Viraj Naik
- Parent: Fattesingrao Anandrao Naik (father)
- Occupation: Politician

Mansing Fattesingrao Naik is a leader of Nationalist Congress Party and was a member of the Maharashtra Legislative Assembly from Shirala Assembly constituency in Sangli city.

== Positions held ==
- 2009: Elected to Maharashtra Legislative Assembly.
- 2019: Elected to Maharashtra Legislative Assembly.
