= Nivedita Sambhajirao Mane =

Indian politician

Nivedita Mane
- निवेदिता माने

Member of Parliament
- In office 1999–2009
- Preceded by: Kallappa Awade
- Succeeded by: Raju Shetti
- Constituency: Hatkanangale

Personal details
- Born: 11 April 1963 (age 63) Kolhapur, Maharashtra
- Party: Shiv Sena (Before 1999 & 2018-Present)
- Other political affiliations: Nationalist Congress Party (1999-2018)
- Spouse: Late. Sambhajirao Rajaram Mane
- Children: 2 sons (Dhairyasheel Sambhajirao Mane)
- As of 16 September, 2006

Nivedita Sambhaji Mane (Marathi: निवेदिता माने; born 11 April 1963) is a politician associated with NCP and Shiv Sena. She was a member of the 14th Lok Sabha of India. She represented the Hatkanangale constituency of Maharashtra for two terms,1999 and 2004, as a member of the Nationalist Congress Party. In the 2009 Lok Sabha polls, she lost to Raju Shetty in Hatkanangle.

On 10 January 2017, Mane, along with NCP MP Dhananjay Mahadik, NCP MLA Hasan Mushrif, Kolhapur mayor Hasina Faras, and 400 others were arrested for blocking traffic on the Pune-Bengaluru National Highway as part of a protest against the effects of demonetization.

Her son Dhairyasheel Sambha Mane was elected to Lok Sabha from Hatkanangle in 2019.

== Positions held ==
- 1999: Elected to 13th Lok Sabha (1st term) from Ichalkaranji
- 2004: Elected to 14th Lok Sabha (2nd term)
- 2015: Elected as Director of Kolhapur district central cooperative Bank
