= Mangesh Chavan =

Indian politician

Mangesh Ramesh Chavan

Member of the Maharashtra Legislative Assembly
- Incumbent
- Assumed office 2019
- Preceded by: Unmesh Patil
- Constituency: Chalisgaon

Personal details
- Party: Bharatiya Janata Party
- Profession: Politician

Mangesh Ramesh Chavan is an Indian politician. He was elected to the Maharashtra Legislative Assembly from Chalisgaon in the 2019 Maharashtra Legislative Assembly election as a member of Bharatiya Janata Party.

== Political career ==
Mangesh Chavan is a member of the Rashtriya Swayamsevak Sangh (RSS), a far-right Hindu nationalist paramilitary volunteer organisation.
