= Hatkanangale Assembly constituency =

Constituency of the Maharashtra legislative assembly in India

Coordinates: 16.75°N 74.43°E

Hatkanangale
- Constituency No. 278 for the Maharashtra Legislative Assembly

Constituency details
- Country: India
- Region: Western India
- State: Maharashtra
- District: Kolhapur
- Lok Sabha constituency: Hatkanangle
- Established: 1952
- Total electors: 342,091
- Reservation: SC

Member of Legislative Assembly
- 15th Maharashtra Legislative Assembly
- Incumbent Ashokrao Mane
- Party: JSS
- Alliance: NDA
- Elected year: 2024

Hatkanangale Assembly constituency is one of the 288 Vidhan Sabha (legislative assembly) constituencies of Maharashtra state, western India. This constituency is located in Kolhapur district, and is part of Hatkanangle Lok Sabha constituency.

== Geographical scope ==
The constituency comprises revenue circles Vathar tarfe, Vadgaon, Vadgaon Kasba, Hatkanangle, Herle, Rui, Hupari, and Vadgaon Kasba Municipal Council in Hatkanangle taluka.

== Members of the Legislative Assembly ==
Election	Member	Party
1952	Babasaheb Bhausaheb Khanjire	Indian National Congress
1952	Powar Dattatraya Santaram	Indian National Congress
1957	Patil Santaram Sakharam	Independent politician
1957	Shirke Dadasaheb Malharrao	Scheduled Castes Federation
1962	Keshav Narsinga Ghatage	Indian National Congress
1967	Babasaheb Bhausaheb Kahanjire	Indian National Congress
1972	Babasaheb Bhausaheb Kahanjire	Indian National Congress
2009	Dr. Sujit Minchekar	Shiv Sena
2014	Dr. Sujit Minchekar	Shiv Sena
2019	Raju Jaywantrao Awale	Indian National Congress
2024	Dr. Ashokrao Mane	Jan Surajya Shakti

== Election results ==
=== Assembly Election 2024 ===
2024 Maharashtra Legislative Assembly election : Hatkanangale
Party	Candidate	Votes	%	±%
JSS	Dr. Ashokrao Mane	134,191	51.30%	▲32.02
INC	Raju Jaywantrao Awale	87,942	33.62%	▲1.73
SWP	Dr. Sujit Minchekar	24,952	9.54%	New
Independent	Pragati Ravindra Chavan	4,373	1.67%	New
VBA	Dr. Kranti Dilip Sawant	3,741	1.43%	▼3.45
NOTA	None of the above	1,152	0.44%	▼0.58
Margin of victory		46,249	17.68%	▲14.75
Turnout		262,721	76.80%	▲3.34
Total valid votes		261,569		
Registered electors		342,091		▲7.51
JSS gain from INC		Swing	▲19.41	

=== Assembly Election 2019 ===
2019 Maharashtra Legislative Assembly election : Hatkanangale
Party	Candidate	Votes	%	±%
INC	Raju Jaywantrao Awale	73,720	31.89%	▲5.00
SS	Dr. Sujit Minchekar	66,950	28.97%	▼11.14
JSS	Dr. Ashokrao Mane	44,562	19.28%	▲4.48
Tararani Paksha	Kambale Kiran Sukumar	19,736	8.54%	New
VBA	S. P. Kamble	11,273	4.88%	New
Independent	Rajiv Kisanrao Awale	6,711	2.90%	New
NOTA	None of the above	2,367	1.02%	▲0.26
Independent	Dr. Avinash Jaywant Sawardekar	2,084	0.90%	New
Independent	Sandip Akaram Dabade	1,440	0.62%	New
Margin of victory		6,770	2.93%	▼10.29
Turnout		233,750	73.46%	▼0.47
Total valid votes		231,135		
Registered electors		318,189		▲5.01
INC gain from SS		Swing	▼8.22	

=== Assembly Election 2014 ===
2014 Maharashtra Legislative Assembly election : Hatkanangale
Party	Candidate	Votes	%	±%
SS	Dr. Sujit Minchekar	89,087	40.11%	▲11.62
INC	Jaywant Gangaram Awale	59,717	26.89%	▼0.58
JSS	Rajiv Kisanrao Awale	32,874	14.80%	▼11.40
SWP	Kadam Pramod Madhukar	21,318	9.60%	▼2.93
BMP	Premkumar Anandrao Mane (Ghunkikar)	5,198	2.34%	New
CPI(M)	Com. Bharama Kamble	4,228	1.90%	New
NCP	Ghatge Dattatray Vishnu	3,855	1.74%	New
MNS	Ranjeet Sadanand Bhosale	1,767	0.80%	New
NOTA	None of the above	1,690	0.76%	New
Margin of victory		29,370	13.22%	▲12.19
Turnout		224,010	73.93%	▲3.36
Total valid votes		222,106		
Registered electors		303,007		▲9.48
SS hold		Swing	▲11.62	

=== Assembly Election 2009 ===
2009 Maharashtra Legislative Assembly election : Hatkanangale
Party	Candidate	Votes	%	±%
SS	Dr. Sujit Minchekar	55,583	28.49%	New
INC	Raju Jaywantrao Awale	53,579	27.47%	▼34.78
JSS	Rajiv Kisanrao Awale	51,102	26.20%	New
SWP	Ghatge Dattatray Vishnu	24,452	12.53%	New
Independent	Vikrant Subhash Sonavane	5,303	2.72%	New
BSP	Malage Mangalrao Jinnappa	5,057	2.59%	New
Margin of victory		2,004	1.03%	▼37.06
Turnout		195,322	70.57%	▼3.34
Total valid votes		195,076		
Registered electors		276,770		▲164.56
SS gain from INC		Swing	▼33.76	

=== Assembly Election 1972 ===
1972 Maharashtra Legislative Assembly election : Hatkanangale
Party	Candidate	Votes	%	±%
INC	B. Bhausaheb Kahanjire	46,967	62.25%	▲19.88
CPI(M)	Patil Shivgonda Pirgonda	18,227	24.16%	▼0.61
ABJS	Shankarrao R. Pujari	4,217	5.59%	New
RPI(K)	Kamble Ratan Balu	3,159	4.19%	New
RPI	Gaikwad Baburao Sidram	1,996	2.65%	New
Independent	Joshi Bhaskar Govind	878	1.16%	New
Margin of victory		28,740	38.09%	▲26.14
Turnout		77,322	73.91%	▼4.16
Total valid votes		75,444		
Registered electors		104,617		▲28.22
INC hold		Swing	▲19.88	

=== Assembly Election 1967 ===
1967 Maharashtra Legislative Assembly election : Hatkanangale
Party	Candidate	Votes	%	±%
INC	B. Bhausaheb Kahanjire	24,996	42.37%	▼28.59
Independent	S. A. Patil	17,946	30.42%	New
CPI(M)	Patil Shivgonda Pirgonda	14,612	24.77%	New
Independent	Rajaram Kallappa Name	1,303	2.21%	New
Margin of victory		7,050	11.95%	▼35.97
Turnout		63,699	78.07%	▲11.02
Total valid votes		58,992		
Registered electors		81,593		▲6.84
INC hold		Swing	▼28.59	

=== Assembly Election 1962 ===
1962 Maharashtra Legislative Assembly election : Hatkanangale
Party	Candidate	Votes	%	±%
INC	Keshav Narsinga Ghatage	34,419	70.96%	▲32.80
RPI	Madhavrao Ishwarrao Kurane	11,176	23.04%	New
Independent	Rajaram Kallappa Name	1,713	3.53%	New
ABJS	Vithal Krishna Kambale	1,198	2.47%	New
Margin of victory		23,243	47.92%	▲35.33
Turnout		51,201	67.05%	▼67.34
Total valid votes		48,506		
Registered electors		76,368		▼41.12
INC gain from Independent		Swing	▲39.13	

=== Assembly Election 1957 ===
1957 Bombay State Legislative Assembly election : Hatkanangale
Party	Candidate	Votes	%	±%
Independent	Patil Santaram Sakharam	55,477	31.83%	New
SCF	Shirke Dadasaheb Malharrao	52,311	30.01%	▲18.81
INC	Mudrale Dinkar Vithoba	33,537	19.24%	▼26.13
INC	Powar Dattatraya Santaram	32,980	18.92%	▼26.45
Margin of victory		21,940	12.59%	▲1.09
Turnout		174,305	134.39%	▲77.09
Total valid votes		174,305		
Registered electors		129,701		▲18.27
Independent gain from INC		Swing	▲9.14	

=== Assembly Election 1952 ===
1952 Bombay State Legislative Assembly election : Hatkanangale
Party	Candidate	Votes	%	±%
INC	Khanjire Babasaheb Bhausaheb	28,519	22.69%	New
INC	Powar Dattatraya Santaram	28,495	22.68%	New
SCF	Shirke Dadasaheb Malharrao	14,070	11.20%	New
Socialist	Vardhamane Dhanpal Devendra	13,997	11.14%	New
Independent	Mane Sarjerao Krishnarao	12,887	10.26%	New
Independent	Lokhande Ananda Doulat	11,897	9.47%	New
Independent	Patil Narasgaonda Anna	6,625	5.27%	New
Independent	Shetty Mallappa Sangappa	4,874	3.88%	New
Independent	Kamble Parasharam Nana	2,603	2.07%	New
Independent	Banage Sahadeo Devappa	1,697	1.35%	New
Margin of victory		14,449	11.50%	
Turnout		125,664	57.30%	
Total valid votes		125,664		
Registered electors		109,661		
INC win (new seat)				
