= Rahul Awade =

Indian politician

Member of the Maharashtra Legislative Assembly
- Incumbent
- Assumed office 2024
- Preceded by: Prakashanna Awade
- Constituency: Ichalkaranji

Personal details
- Born: Rahul Prakashanna Awade; 22 September 1978 (age 47)
- Party: Bharatiya Janata Party (2024–present)
- Other political affiliations: Indian National Congress (Before 2019)
- Spouse: Moshmi Rahul Awade
- Parent(s): Prakashanna Awade (Father); Kallappa Awade (Grandfather)
- Profession: Politician

Rahul Prakashanna Awade is an Indian politician from Maharashtra. He is a member of the Maharashtra Legislative Assembly from 2024, representing Ichalkaranji Assembly constituency as a member of the Bharatiya Janata Party.

== Political career ==
Rahul Awade became a member of the Rashtriya Swayamsevak Sangh (RSS), a far-right Hindu nationalist paramilitary volunteer organisation before he and his family were senior members of Indian National Congress.

== See also ==
- List of chief ministers of Maharashtra
- Maharashtra Legislative Assembly
