= Dhairyasheel Sambhajirao Mane =

Politician from Hatkangale, Kolhapur Maharashtra, India

Dhairyasheel Mane

Member of Parliament, Lok Sabha
- Incumbent
- Assumed office 17 June 2019
- Preceded by: Raju Shetti
- Constituency: Hatkanangle

Personal details
- Born: 23 December 1981 (age 44)
- Party: Shiv Sena
- Relatives: Nivedita Sambhajirao Mane (Mother)

Dhairyasheel Sambhajirao Mane (b 1981) is an Indian politician. He is elected to the Lok Sabha, lower house of the Parliament of India from Hatkanangale, Maharashtra in the 2019 Indian general election as a member of the Shiv Sena. He received a total of 5,85,776 votes.

His grandfather Rajaram Mane was a member of Lok Sabha for 5 consecutive terms (1977 to 1991). He represented Ichalkaranji constituency and was a member of the Indian National Congress. Dhairyshil's mother Nivedita Mane was also an MP of Lok Sabha for two terms - 1999 and 2004, representing Ichalkaranji constituency for the Nationalist Congress Party.

== Positions held ==
- 2002 : Elected as member of Rukadi Gram Panchayat
- 2007 : Elected as member of Kolhapur Zilha Parishad
- 2009 : Elected as Deputy president of Kolhapur Zilha Parishad
- 2012 : Re-Elected as member of Kolhapur Zilha Parishad
- 2012 : Elected as opposition leader of Kolhapur Zilha Parishad
- 2019 : Elected to 17th Lok Sabha, from Hatkanangale
- 2024 : Elected to 18th Lok Sabha, from Hatkanangale
