= Chalisgaon Assembly constituency =

Constituency of the Maharashtra legislative assembly in India

Coordinates: 20.46°N 75.00°E

Chalisgaon
- Constituency No. 17 for the Maharashtra Legislative Assembly

Constituency details
- Country: India
- Region: Western India
- State: Maharashtra
- District: Jalgaon
- Lok Sabha constituency: Jalgaon
- Established: 1957
- Total electors: 376,664
- Reservation: None

Member of Legislative Assembly
- 15th Maharashtra Legislative Assembly
- Incumbent Mangesh Chavan
- Party: BJP
- Alliance: NDA
- Elected year: 2024

Chalisgaon Assembly constituency is one of the 286 Vidhan Sabha (Legislative Assembly) constituencies of Maharashtra state in western India. This constituency is located in the Jalgaon district.

== Overview ==
Chalisgaon is part of the Jalgaon Lok Sabha constituency along with five other Vidhan Sabha segments of this district, namely Jalgaon City, Jalgaon Rural, Erandol, Amalner and Pachora.

== Members of the Legislative Assembly ==
Year	Member	Party
From 1952 - 1957 see: Bhadgaon Chalisgaon
1957	Rajaram Bhila Sonawane	Indian National Congress
1962	Motiram Shamrao Suryananshi	Indian National Congress
1967	Dinakar Diwan Chavan	Indian National Congress
1972	Dinakar Diwan Chavan	Indian National Congress
1978	Dinakar Diwan Chavan	Indian National Congress
1980	Dinakar Diwan Chavan	Independent politician
1985	Vasudevrao Apuram Changare	Indian Congress (Socialist)
1990	Ishwar Ramchandra Jadhav	Bharatiya Janata Party
1995	Sahebrao Sitaram Ghode	Bharatiya Janata Party
1999	Sahebrao Sitaram Ghode	Bharatiya Janata Party
2004	Sahebrao Sitaram Ghode	Bharatiya Janata Party
2009	Rajivdada Deshmukh	Nationalist Congress Party
2014	Unmesh Bhaiyyasaheb Patil	Bharatiya Janata Party
2019	Mangesh Chavan	Bharatiya Janata Party
2024	Mangesh Chavan	Bharatiya Janata Party

== Election results ==
=== Assembly Election 2024 ===
2024 Maharashtra Legislative Assembly election : Chalisgaon
Party	Candidate	Votes	%	±%
BJP	Mangesh Ramesh Chavan	157,101	67.60%	▲27.60
SS(UBT)	Unmesh Bhaiyyasaheb Patil	71,448	30.75%	New
NOTA	None of the Above	1,813	0.78%	▲0.00
Margin of victory		85,653	36.86%	▲34.88
Turnout		2,34,200	62.18%	▼0.87
Total valid votes		2,32,387		
Registered electors		3,76,664		▲8.97
BJP hold		Swing	▲27.60	

=== Assembly Election 2019 ===
2019 Maharashtra Legislative Assembly election : Chalisgaon
Party	Candidate	Votes	%	±%
BJP	Mangesh Ramesh Chavan	86,515	40.00%	▼5.53
NCP	Deshmukh Rajiv Anil	82,228	38.02%	▲3.24
VBA	Morsing Gopa Rathod	38,429	17.77%	New
Independent	Dr.Vinod Murlidhar Kotkar	4,617	2.13%	New
NOTA	None of the Above	1,677	0.78%	▼0.06
MNS	Rakesh Lalchand Jadhav	1,399	0.65%	▼1.45
BSP	Onkar Pitambar Kedar	1,301	0.60%	New
Margin of victory		4,287	1.98%	▼8.77
Turnout		2,17,967	63.06%	▼1.77
Total valid votes		2,16,276		
Registered electors		3,45,660		▲6.85
BJP hold		Swing	▼5.53	

=== Assembly Election 2014 ===
2014 Maharashtra Legislative Assembly election : Chalisgaon
Party	Candidate	Votes	%	±%
BJP	Unmesh Bhaiyyasaheb Patil	94,754	45.53%	▲1.37
NCP	Deshmukh Rajiv Anil	72,374	34.77%	▼14.13
Independent	Gunjal Ramesh Sahebrao	25,689	12.34%	New
SS	Ramdas Motiram Patil	4,789	2.30%	New
MNS	Jadhav Rakesh Lalchand	4,356	2.09%	New
INC	Ashok Hari Khalane	3,328	1.60%	New
NOTA	None of the Above	1,734	0.83%	New
Independent	Pitambar Zulal Zalte	1,471	0.71%	New
Margin of victory		22,380	10.75%	▲6.00
Turnout		2,10,103	64.95%	▲4.27
Total valid votes		2,08,121		
Registered electors		3,23,486		▲9.86
BJP gain from NCP		Swing	▼3.38	

=== Assembly Election 2009 ===
2009 Maharashtra Legislative Assembly election : Chalisgaon
Party	Candidate	Votes	%	±%
NCP	Deshmukh Rajiv Anil	86,505	48.91%	▲22.34
BJP	Rathod Wadilal Parashram	78,105	44.16%	▲10.42
Independent	Kishor Bhikanrao Patil	3,745	2.12%	New
Independent	Laxman Shivaji Shirsath	2,980	1.68%	New
BSP	More Rajaram Barku	2,146	1.21%	▼0.64
Independent	Bhalerao Bhagwan Hari	1,282	0.72%	New
Margin of victory		8,400	4.75%	▼2.43
Turnout		1,76,901	60.08%	▲3.03
Total valid votes		1,76,876		
Registered electors		2,94,456		▲26.17
NCP gain from BJP		Swing	▲15.17	

=== Assembly Election 2004 ===
2004 Maharashtra Legislative Assembly election : Chalisgaon
Party	Candidate	Votes	%	±%
BJP	Ghode Sahebrao Sitaram	44,915	33.74%	▼12.47
NCP	Jadhav Ananda Pundlik	35,362	26.56%	▼15.65
Independent	Adv Wagh Madhavrao Anantrao	3,202	2.41%	New
Independent	Ramesh Gulabrao Dhammaratna	2,566	1.93%	New
BSP	Ahire Iswarlal Sitaram	2,472	1.86%	New
LJP	Chavan Subhash Mango	1,173	0.88%	New
Independent	Ishwar Ramchandra Jadhav	1,100	0.83%	New
Margin of victory		9,553	7.18%	▲3.17
Turnout		1,33,188	57.07%	▲5.89
Total valid votes		1,33,119		
Registered electors		2,33,378		▲18.22
BJP hold		Swing	▼12.47	

=== Assembly Election 1999 ===
1999 Maharashtra Legislative Assembly election : Chalisgaon
Party	Candidate	Votes	%	±%
BJP	Ghode Sahebrao Sitaram	46,660	46.21%	▲1.62
NCP	Chavan Vishwas Dagdu	42,619	42.21%	New
RPI	Zalte Dhanaji Raghu	10,768	10.66%	▲9.25
Margin of victory		4,041	4.00%	▼9.22
Turnout		1,09,080	55.26%	▼5.12
Total valid votes		1,00,969		
Registered electors		1,97,404		▼1.39
BJP hold		Swing	▲1.62	

=== Assembly Election 1995 ===
1995 Maharashtra Legislative Assembly election : Chalisgaon
Party	Candidate	Votes	%	±%
BJP	Ghode Sahebrao Sitaram	50,236	44.60%	▲9.64
INC	Chavan Vishwas Dagdu	35,343	31.38%	▲8.26
JD	Ishwar Ramchandra Jadhav	16,275	14.45%	▲5.04
Maharashtra Vikas Congres	Ghule Prakash Dattatrya	2,438	2.16%	New
BBM	More Bhanji Bhikari	2,304	2.05%	New
Independent	Kedar Sanjay Kisan	2,110	1.87%	New
RPI	Dhivare M. G.	1,592	1.41%	▼4.81
Margin of victory		14,893	13.22%	▲1.39
Turnout		1,17,535	58.71%	▲11.85
Total valid votes		1,12,644		
Registered electors		2,00,190		▲13.78
BJP hold		Swing	▲9.64	

=== Assembly Election 1990 ===
1990 Maharashtra Legislative Assembly election : Chalisgaon
Party	Candidate	Votes	%	±%
BJP	Ishwar Ramchandra Jadhav	27,315	34.95%	New
INC	Changare Vasudeoram Apuram	18,066	23.12%	▼21.72
Independent	Dinakar Diwan Chavan	16,363	20.94%	New
JD	Ahite Saroj Kiran	7,355	9.41%	New
RPI	Zalte Dhanaji Raghu	4,867	6.23%	New
BSP	More Julal Japuji	867	1.11%	New
Independent	Bagul Bhagwan Shankar	844	1.08%	New
Margin of victory		9,249	11.84%	▲2.84
Turnout		79,896	45.41%	▼0.59
Total valid votes		78,149		
Registered electors		1,75,940		▲26.80
BJP gain from IC(S)		Swing	▼18.89	

=== Assembly Election 1985 ===
1985 Maharashtra Legislative Assembly election : Chalisgaon
Party	Candidate	Votes	%	±%
IC(S)	Changare Vasudevrao Apuram	33,622	53.84%	New
INC	Chavan Dinakarrao Diwan	28,003	44.84%	New
Independent	Nikam Nana Rayala	495	0.79%	New
Margin of victory		5,619	9.00%	▼1.44
Turnout		63,602	45.84%	▲0.01
Total valid votes		62,450		
Registered electors		1,38,756		▲10.88
IC(S) gain from Independent		Swing	▲0.06	

=== Assembly Election 1980 ===
1980 Maharashtra Legislative Assembly election : Chalisgaon
Party	Candidate	Votes	%	±%
Independent	Dinakar Diwan Chavan	30,283	53.78%	New
INC(I)	Changre Vasudeorao Apuram	24,405	43.34%	New
Independent	Tryambak Malha Jagtap	852	1.51%	New
RPI	Zalte Dhanaji Raghu	621	1.10%	New
Margin of victory		5,878	10.44%	▼12.99
Turnout		57,966	46.32%	▼9.72
Total valid votes		56,314		
Registered electors		1,25,145		▲10.13
Independent gain from INC		Swing	▼1.14	

=== Assembly Election 1978 ===
1978 Maharashtra Legislative Assembly election : Chalisgaon
Party	Candidate	Votes	%	±%
INC	Dinakar Diwan Chavan	34,144	54.91%	▼24.11
Independent	Jadhav Madhukar Gomaje	19,575	31.48%	New
Independent	Bagul Bhagwan Shankar	6,598	10.61%	New
Independent	Chavan Jijabai Shamrao	1,037	1.67%	New
Independent	Jagtap Parbhakar Kautik	455	0.73%	New
Margin of victory		14,569	23.43%	▼41.45
Turnout		64,222	56.51%	▲12.75
Total valid votes		62,179		
Registered electors		1,13,638		▲20.25
INC hold		Swing	▼24.11	

=== Assembly Election 1972 ===
1972 Maharashtra Legislative Assembly election : Chalisgaon
Party	Candidate	Votes	%	±%
INC	Dinakar Diwan Chavan	31,340	79.02%	▲22.81
RPI	Zalte Dhanaji Raghu	5,607	14.14%	▲0.47
ABJS	Suklal Nathu Mochi	2,715	6.85%	▼4.61
Margin of victory		25,733	64.88%	▲22.99
Turnout		41,212	43.61%	▼5.89
Total valid votes		39,662		
Registered electors		94,504		▲12.19
INC hold		Swing	▲22.81	

=== Assembly Election 1967 ===
1967 Maharashtra Legislative Assembly election : Chalisgaon
Party	Candidate	Votes	%	±%
INC	Dinakar Diwan Chavan	22,656	56.20%	▲1.03
PSP	M. D. More	5,770	14.31%	▼10.92
RPI	P. V. More	5,511	13.67%	New
ABJS	P. M. More	4,616	11.45%	New
Independent	S. B. Chavan	1,758	4.36%	New
Margin of victory		16,886	41.89%	▲11.95
Turnout		43,522	51.67%	▼9.34
Total valid votes		40,311		
Registered electors		84,237		▲13.76
INC hold		Swing	▲1.03	

=== Assembly Election 1962 ===
1962 Maharashtra Legislative Assembly election : Chalisgaon
Party	Candidate	Votes	%	±%
INC	Motiram Shamrao Suryananshi	23,368	55.18%	▲11.69
PSP	Deoram Ramji Chavan	10,687	25.23%	▼31.29
CPI	Hiralal Bhilaji Chavan	6,607	15.60%	New
Independent	Daulat Tanhaji Koli	1,690	3.99%	New
Margin of victory		12,681	29.94%	▲16.90
Turnout		46,742	63.12%	▼1.20
Total valid votes		42,352		
Registered electors		74,048		▲18.11
INC gain from PSP		Swing	▼1.34	

=== Assembly Election 1957 ===
1957 Bombay State Legislative Assembly election : Chalisgaon
Party	Candidate	Votes	%	±%
PSP	Sonawane Rajaram Bhila	20,691	56.52%	New
INC	Motiram Shamrao Suryananshi	15,918	43.48%	New
Margin of victory		4,773	13.04%	
Turnout		36,609	58.39%	
Total valid votes		36,609		
Registered electors		62,695		
PSP win (new seat)				

== See also ==
- Chalisgaon
- List of constituencies of Maharashtra Vidhan Sabha
