= Raju Shetti =

Indian politician

Member of the Indian Parliament for Hatkanangle
- In office 16 May 2009 – 23 May 2019
- Preceded by: Nivedita Mane
- Succeeded by: Dhairyasheel Sambhajirao Mane

Personal details
- Born: Devappa Anna Shetti; 1 June 1967 (age 59) Shirol, Kolhapur, Maharashtra
- Party: Swabhimani Paksha
- Spouse: Sangeeta Shetti
- Children: Saurabh Shetti
- Profession: Politician
- Website: https://www.shetkarimedia.com

Devappa Anna Shetti (known as Raju Shetti) (Marathi: राजू शेट्टी) is an Indian Politician and former Member of Parliament of India from the Hatkanangle constituency in the 16th Lok Sabha. He is the president of the Swabhimani Paksha, the political party which he founded in 2004, after separating from the Shetkari Sanghatana. He also founded the Swabhimani Shetkari Saghtana.

== Personal life ==
Raju Shetti was born in Shirol, a tehsil in Kolhapur district of Maharashtra to a Jain family, on 1 June 1967. He is the son of Anna Shetti and Ratna Bai Shetti. He did his SSC,10th Pass Bagani Highschool Bagani, Dist- Sangli In Year 1983-84, Kolhapur. He is married to Sangeeta Shetti and has a son.

== Career ==
Raju Shetti was associated with Sharad Joshi's Shetkari Sanghatana (Farmer's Organization), but due to some disputes with the organization, he formed a new organization named, Swabhimani Shetkari Saghtana.

In year 2001, he fought an election for Zilla Parishad from Udgaon constituency and won.

In 2004, Shetti was elected to Maharashtra Legislative Assembly from Shirol as an independent. Later, he formed Swabhimani Paksha.

In the 2009 Indian general election, he fought from Hatkanangle as a Swabhimani Paksha candidate, and defeated sitting MP Nivedita Sambhajirao Mane and was elected to the Lok Sabha.

His party, Swabhimani Paksha, formed an alliance with Bharatiya Janata Party and joined NDA in 2014. He re-contested his constituency, Hatkanangle, in 2014 and was reelected to the Parliament defeating Kallappa Awade.

He is currently the editor of fortnightly, Swabhimani Vichar and has authored his autobiography, Shivar te Sansad.

== Award ==
On 22 Dec 2011, he was presented with the Lokmat Maharashtrian of Year 2011 awards in Mumbai by President Pratibha Patil.

== Positions held ==
- 2001: Elected as member of Zilla Parishad, Kolhapur district
- 2004: Elected as member of Maharashtra Legislative Assembly
- 2009 : Elected to 15th Lok Sabha(1st term)
- 2014 : Elected to 16th Lok Sabha(2nd term)
