= Shirala Walva Assembly constituency =

Constituency of the Maharashtra legislative assembly in India

Shirala Walva
- Former constituency for the Maharashtra Legislative Assembly

Constituency details
- Country: India
- Region: Western India
- State: Maharashtra
- Established: 1952
- Abolished: 1955
- Total electors: 52,705
- Reservation: None

Shirala Walva Assembly constituency was an assembly constituency in the India state of Maharashtra. After 1955 Delimitation act, it was split into Shirala, Walva and Karad.

== Members of the Legislative Assembly ==
Election	Member	Party
1952	Babar Sarojini Krishnarao	Indian National Congress

== Election results ==
=== Assembly Election 1952 ===
1952 Bombay State Legislative Assembly election : Shirala Walva
Party	Candidate	Votes	%	±%
INC	Babar Sarojini Krishnarao	11,066	36.42%	New
PWPI	Patil Yeshwant Chandroji	9,727	32.01%	New
Independent	Patil Gajanan Balajee	3,974	13.08%	New
Independent	Patankar Babuji Bala	3,231	10.63%	New
Independent	Mohite Mahadeo Tukaram	1,807	5.95%	New
Independent	Mahind Vishnu Bhau	578	1.90%	New
Margin of victory		1,339	4.41%	
Turnout		30,383	57.65%	
Total valid votes		30,383		
Registered electors		52,705		
INC win (new seat)				
