= Udgaon =

Village in Maharashtra

Coordinates: 16°47′39″N 74°34′10″E

- Village
- Interactive map of Udgaon
- Country: India
- State: Maharashtra

Udgaon is a village in Shirol taluka in Kolhapur District, Maharashtra, India.

Udgaon is suburn located 8 km nearest big city sangli. is located 7.3 km distance from its Taluk Main Town Shirol. Udgaon is 35.7 km far from its District Main City Kolhapur. It is 310 km from its State Main City Mumbai.

Villages near this village with distances are Umalwad (2.9 km), Agar (4.4 km), Jainapur (Maharashtra) (5.1 km), Chipri (5.5 km), and Shirol (6.2 km). The nearest towns are Shirol (7.3 km), Hatkanangale (16.1 km), Karveer (33.7 km), and Kagal (36.1 km). Abdul Lat, Agar, Akiwat, Arjunwad, Aurwad, and Chinchwad are the villages along with this village in the same Shirol Taluka.
