= Rajivdada Deshmukh =

Indian politician (died 2025)

Member of Maharashtra Legislative Assembly
- In office 2009–2014
- Preceded by: Sahebrao Ghode
- Succeeded by: Unmesh Bhaiyyasaheb Patil
- Constituency: Chalisgaon

Personal details
- Died: 21 October 2025
- Party: Nationalist Congress Party
- Spouse: Padmaja Deshmukh

Rajivdada Anildada Deshmukh (died 21 October 2025) was an Indian politician and a member of the Nationalist Congress Party. He was a Member of the Maharashtra Legislative Assembly from the Chalisgaaon constituency. Deshmukh died on 21 October 2025.
