= Ashokrao Mane =

Indian politician

Member of the Maharashtra Legislative Assembly
- Incumbent
- Assumed office 23 November 2024
- Preceded by: Raju Awale
- Constituency: Hatkanangale

Personal details
- Party: Jan Surajya Shakti
- Profession: Politician

Dalitmitra Ashokrao Kondiram Mane (Bapu) is an Indian politician from Maharashtra who is a member of the Maharashtra Legislative Assembly from 2024, representing Hatkanangale Assembly constituency as a member of the Jan Surajya Shakti.

== See also ==
- List of chief ministers of Maharashtra
- Maharashtra Legislative Assembly
