= Umalwad =

Village in Maharashtra

- Village
- Interactive map of Umalwad
- Coordinates: 16°48′10″N 74°32′47″E
- Country: India
- State: Maharashtra
- District: Kolhapur

Umalwad is a small village in Kolhapur district, Maharashtra, India. It is situated 3 km from the north side of Jaysingpur city. This village is famous for guava.

== History ==
The village dates back to the years 1600–1700. It is situated on the bank of the Krishna River, which flows from north to south..

== Culture ==
This village is known for temples of many faiths. Umalwad hosts Ramling Temple, Shree Danling temple, Shree Hanuman temple, Shree Vitthal-Rukmini Temple, Shree Basaveshwar temple, and Shree Ganapati temple. A Christian church is also present.

=== Places of worship ===
- (K.D.C., C.N.I.) church Umalwad

==== Temples ====
- Shri Danling Maharaj Temple
- Shri Ramling Temple
- Shri Jain Basti
- Shri Birdev Temple
- Shri Basveshwar Temple
- Shri Hanuman Temple
- Shri Vitthal Rukmini Temple
- Shri Ganpati Temple
- Buddha Temple

== Demographics ==
The population was 5,035 as of the 2011 census.

== Language ==
Marathi is the official language. Some residents speak Kannada language, who belong to Jain and Lingayat communities.

== Festivals ==
The big festival celebrated in Umalwad is Shri Danling Maharaj Yatra, celebrated every year on Maha Shivaratri. The second festival celebrated is Shri Hanuman Jayanti. The third festival celebrated is Shri Birdev Yatra. Shri Mahavir Jayanti is also celebrated every year by Jain people. The one more big festival celebrated every year is Dr. Babasaheb Ambedkar Birth Celebrations.
