= Sujit Roy =

Indian cricketer (born 1984)

Personal information
- Full name: Sujit Ramkumar Roy
- Born: 10 November 1984 (age 41); Jamshedpur, Bihar
- Batting: Right-handed
- Bowling: Right-arm medium
- Role: Bowler

Domestic team information
- Years: Team
- 2001/02–2009/10: Jharkhand
- Source: ESPNcricinfo, 11 October 2015

Sujit Roy (born 10 November 1984) is an Indian first-class cricketer who plays for Jharkhand. He was born in Jamshedpur.
