= Ichalkaranji Assembly constituency =

Constituency of the Maharashtra legislative assembly in India

Coordinates: 16.70°N 74.46°E

Ichalkaranji
- Constituency No. 279 for the Maharashtra Legislative Assembly

Constituency details
- Country: India
- Region: Western India
- State: Maharashtra
- District: Kolhapur
- Lok Sabha constituency: Hatkanangle
- Established: 1978
- Total electors: 312,823
- Reservation: None

Member of Legislative Assembly
- 15th Maharashtra Legislative Assembly
- Incumbent Rahul Awade
- Party: BJP
- Alliance: NDA
- Elected year: 2024

Ichalkaranji Assembly constituency is one of the 288 Vidhan Sabha (legislative assembly) constituencies of Maharashtra state, western India. This constituency is located in Kolhapur district.

== Geographical scope ==
The constituency comprises Ichalkaranji revenue circle and Ichalkaranji Municipal Council belonging to Hatkanangale taluka.

== Members of the Legislative Assembly ==
Year	Member	Party
Until 1978: Constituency did not exist
1978	Shivagonda Patil	Communist Party of India (Marxist)
1980	Kallappa Awade	Indian National Congress (U)
1985	Kallappa Awade	Indian National Congress
1990	K. L. Malabade	Communist Party of India (Marxist)
1995	Prakashanna Awade	Indian National Congress
1999	Prakashanna Awade	Indian National Congress
2004	Prakashanna Awade	Indian National Congress
2009	Suresh Halvankar	Bharatiya Janata Party
2014	Suresh Halvankar	Bharatiya Janata Party
2019	Prakashanna Awade	Independent
2024	Rahul Awade	Bharatiya Janata Party

== Election results ==
=== Assembly Election 2024 ===
2024 Maharashtra Legislative Assembly election : Ichalkaranji
Party	Candidate	Votes	%	±%
BJP	Rahul Awade	131,919	60.68%	▲27.10
NCP-SP	Madan Sitaram Karande	75,108	34.55%	New
Independent	Chopade Vitthal Pundlik	2,461	1.13%	New
MNS	Ravi Gajanan Gondkar	2,143	0.99%	New
Independent	Sam Alias Sachin Shivaji Athawale	2,133	0.98%	New
NOTA	None of the Above	1,487	0.68%	▼0.07
Margin of victory		56,811	26.13%	▲1.20
Turnout		2,18,897	69.97%	▲1.42
Total valid votes		2,17,410		
Registered electors		3,12,823		▲6.61
BJP gain from Independent		Swing	▲2.16	

=== Assembly Election 2019 ===
2019 Maharashtra Legislative Assembly election : Ichalkaranji
Party	Candidate	Votes	%	±%
Independent	Prakashanna Awade	116,886	58.51%	New
BJP	Suresh Ganpati Halvankar	67,076	33.58%	▼13.90
INC	Rahul Prakash Khanjire	7,262	3.64%	▼36.17
VBA	Shashikant Vasantrao Amane	3,693	1.85%	New
NOTA	None of the Above	1,513	0.76%	▼0.00
ABHM	Santosh Dattatray Koli (Balmaharaj)	1,331	0.67%	New
Margin of victory		49,810	24.94%	▲17.26
Turnout		2,01,271	68.59%	▼5.66
Total valid votes		1,99,758		
Registered electors		2,93,431		▲9.03
Independent gain from BJP		Swing	▲11.04	

=== Assembly Election 2014 ===
2014 Maharashtra Legislative Assembly election : Ichalkaranji
Party	Candidate	Votes	%	±%
BJP	Suresh Ganpati Halvankar	94,214	47.48%	▼1.64
INC	Prakashanna Awade	78,989	39.80%	▲3.35
NCP	Madan Sitaram Karande	14,797	7.46%	New
SS	Muralidhar Raghunath Jadhav	3,902	1.97%	New
Jai Janseva Party	Jaju Mishrilal Gopikishan	2,038	1.03%	New
CPI(M)	Sadashiv Annappa Malabade	1,574	0.79%	▼1.37
NOTA	None of the Above	1,505	0.76%	New
Margin of victory		15,225	7.67%	▼5.00
Turnout		2,00,133	74.37%	▲3.60
Total valid votes		1,98,444		
Registered electors		2,69,122		▲2.90
BJP hold		Swing	▼1.64	

=== Assembly Election 2009 ===
2009 Maharashtra Legislative Assembly election : Ichalkaranji
Party	Candidate	Votes	%	±%
BJP	Suresh Ganpati Halvankar	90,104	49.12%	New
INC	Prakashanna Awade	66,867	36.45%	▼22.44
Independent	Jambhale Ashok Ramchandra	9,613	5.24%	New
Independent	Bargir Raj Appalal	7,660	4.18%	New
CPI(M)	Datta Hari Mane	3,966	2.16%	▼3.64
BSP	Vijay Dinkar Kamble	1,616	0.88%	▼1.69
Independent	Suresh Annappa Gadage	1,446	0.79%	New
Margin of victory		23,237	12.67%	▼27.29
Turnout		1,83,452	70.14%	▲0.90
Total valid votes		1,83,433		
Registered electors		2,61,541		▼1.11
BJP gain from INC		Swing	▼9.77	

=== Assembly Election 2004 ===
2004 Maharashtra Legislative Assembly election : Ichalkaranji
Party	Candidate	Votes	%	±%
INC	Prakashanna Awade	107,846	58.89%	▲16.71
Independent	Pujari Shankarrao Ramchandra	34,672	18.93%	New
Independent	Shirgave Dhonidlal Abdul	23,455	12.81%	New
CPI(M)	Salunkhe Suryaji Ramchandra	10,622	5.80%	▼1.61
BSP	Belekar Krishna Sudam	4,708	2.57%	New
Margin of victory		73,174	39.96%	▲24.91
Turnout		1,83,131	69.24%	▲3.47
Total valid votes		1,83,129		
Registered electors		2,64,487		▲14.00
INC hold		Swing	▲16.71	

=== Assembly Election 1999 ===
1999 Maharashtra Legislative Assembly election : Ichalkaranji
Party	Candidate	Votes	%	±%
INC	Prakashanna Awade	64,365	42.18%	▼4.45
NCP	Ashok Ramchandra Jambhale	41,402	27.13%	New
BJP	Shankarrao Pujari	29,950	19.63%	▲15.96
CPI(M)	Comred Suryaji Salunkhe	11,313	7.41%	▼37.83
JD(S)	Hogade Pratap Ganapatrao	4,474	2.93%	New
Margin of victory		22,963	15.05%	▲13.66
Turnout		1,58,540	68.33%	▼13.16
Total valid votes		1,52,600		
Registered electors		2,32,006		▲4.03
INC hold		Swing	▼4.45	

=== Assembly Election 1995 ===
1995 Maharashtra Legislative Assembly election : Ichalkaranji
Party	Candidate	Votes	%	±%
INC	Prakashanna Awade	82,086	46.63%	▲1.54
CPI(M)	K. L. Malabade	79,643	45.24%	▼4.02
BJP	Masal Bapuso Krishnath	6,458	3.67%	▼1.47
Independent	Jaju Mishrilal Gopikishan	5,514	3.13%	New
Independent	Patil Kisan Shankar	1,530	0.87%	New
Margin of victory		2,443	1.39%	▼2.79
Turnout		1,80,056	80.73%	▲8.49
Total valid votes		1,76,037		
Registered electors		2,23,027		▲6.61
INC gain from CPI(M)		Swing	▼2.63	

=== Assembly Election 1990 ===
1990 Maharashtra Legislative Assembly election : Ichalkaranji
Party	Candidate	Votes	%	±%
CPI(M)	K. L. Malabade	72,600	49.26%	▲21.36
INC	Prakashanna Awade	66,446	45.09%	▲0.27
BJP	Mishrilal Gopikisan Jaju	7,566	5.13%	New
Margin of victory		6,154	4.18%	▼12.74
Turnout		1,49,123	71.28%	▼3.31
Total valid votes		1,47,371		
Registered electors		2,09,200		▲33.53
CPI(M) gain from INC		Swing	▲4.44	

=== Assembly Election 1985 ===
1985 Maharashtra Legislative Assembly election : Ichalkaranji
Party	Candidate	Votes	%	±%
INC	Prakashanna Awade	51,791	44.82%	New
CPI(M)	K. L. Malabade	32,244	27.90%	▲11.88
Independent	Swami Mallaya Dattatraya	18,033	15.61%	New
JP	Nemishte Raghunath Tukaram	11,604	10.04%	New
Independent	Murdande Gajanan Shankar	1,475	1.28%	New
Margin of victory		19,547	16.92%	▲4.74
Turnout		1,17,076	74.73%	▲4.07
Total valid votes		1,15,557		
Registered electors		1,56,668		▲18.70
INC gain from INC(U)		Swing	▼3.13	

=== Assembly Election 1980 ===
1980 Maharashtra Legislative Assembly election : Ichalkaranji
Party	Candidate	Votes	%	±%
INC(U)	Kallappa Baburao Awade	44,104	47.95%	New
INC(I)	Khanjire Babasaheb Bhausaheb	32,905	35.77%	▲10.32
CPI(M)	S. P. Patil	14,738	16.02%	▼27.84
Margin of victory		11,199	12.18%	▼2.20
Turnout		93,199	70.61%	▼7.33
Total valid votes		91,978		
Registered electors		1,31,983		▲16.71
INC(U) gain from CPI(M)		Swing	▲4.09	

=== Assembly Election 1978 ===
1978 Maharashtra Legislative Assembly election : Ichalkaranji
Party	Candidate	Votes	%	±%
CPI(M)	Patil Shivagonda Pirgonda	38,206	43.86%	New
INC	Kallappa Baburao Awade	25,686	29.49%	New
INC(I)	Khanjire Babasheb Bhausaheb	22,169	25.45%	New
Independent	Chavan Raghunath Dayanu	1,039	1.19%	New
Margin of victory		12,520	14.37%	
Turnout		88,477	78.24%	
Total valid votes		87,100		
Registered electors		1,13,083		
CPI(M) win (new seat)				
