= Kallappa Awade =

Indian politician (born 1931)

Kallapanna Awade 'दादा'

Member of Parliament, Lok Sabha
- In office (1996-1998), (1998 – 1999)
- Preceded by: Rajaram Mane
- Succeeded by: Nivedita Mane
- Constituency: Ichalkaranji

Member of Maharashtra Legislative Assembly
- In office (1980-1985), (1985 – 1990)
- Preceded by: Shivagonda Patil
- Succeeded by: K. L. Malabade
- Constituency: Ichalkaranji

Personal details
- Born: 5 July 1931 (age 95) Ichalkaranji, Kolhapur District, Bombay Presidency, British India
- Party: Indian National Congress
- Spouse: Late Smt.Indumati Awade
- Children: 5 (including Prakashanna Awade)

Kallappa Baburao Awade (born 5 July 1931) is an Indian politician. He was elected to the Lok Sabha, the lower house of the Parliament of India from the Ichalkaranji in Maharashtra as a member of the Indian National Congress.

He unsuccessfully contested in 2014 Lok Sabha Polls from Hatkanangle Lok Sabha constituency.
