= Unmesh Bhaiyyasaheb Patil =

Indian politician

Member of Parliament, Lok Sabha
- In office 23 May 2019 – 2024
- Preceded by: A. T. Patil
- Succeeded by: Smita Wagh
- Constituency: Jalgaon

Member of the Maharashtra Legislative Assembly
- In office 14 October 2014 – 23 May 2019
- Preceded by: Rajivdada Deshmukh
- Succeeded by: Mangesh Chavan
- Constituency: Chalisgaon

Personal details
- Born: June 24, 1978 (age 47)
- Party: Shiv Sena(UBT) (2024-Present)
- Other political affiliations: Bharatiya Janata Party (Before 2024)
- Spouse: Sampada Unmesh Patil
- Parents: Bhaiyasaheb Patil (father); Mangala Patil (mother)
- Education: B.E Chemical Engineering
- Alma mater: North Maharashtra University
- Occupation: Politician
- Website: http://unmeshpatil.in/

Unmesh Bhaiyyasaheb Patil was elected in 17th Lok Sabha from Jalgaon Loksabha Constituency and also member of the 13th Maharashtra Legislative Assembly. He represents the Chalisgaon Assembly Constituency. He won 2019 Lok Sabha election with a record margin of 4,11,617 votes, third highest in Maharashtra. His parliamentary performance was exemplary. He raised 457 questions in parliament, far surpassing the national average of 210. He introduced 8 private member bills for Jalgaon constituency, well above the average of 1.5, participated in 133 debates, as compared to the national average of 46.2. He now belongs to the Uddhav Balasaheb Thackeray Shivsena & former Member of Bharatiya Janata Party.

== Political career ==
Unmesh Patil was elected as a Member of the Legislative Assembly (MLA) from the Chalisgaon constituency in 2014 and served as the Chairman of the Maharashtra State Co-operative Sugar Factories Federation Ltd from 2015 to 2019.

== Early life and education ==
Unmesh Patil was born on 24 June 1978 in Jalgaon, Maharashtra. He completed his Bachelor's degree in B.E. Chemical Engineering, North Maharashtra University. Masters in E-Commerce Management from Mumbai.
