= Ichalkaranji Lok Sabha constituency =

Constituency of the Indian parliament in Maharashtra

Coordinates: 16.70°N 74.46°E

Ichalkaranji
- Former Lok Sabha constituency

Constituency details
- Country: India
- Region: Western India
- State: Maharashtra
- Established: 1977
- Abolished: 2009
- Reservation: None

Ichalkaranji was a Lok Sabha parliamentary constituency of Maharashtra. It was merged into Hatkanangle constituency after delimitation in 2008

== Members of Parliament ==
Year	Member	Party
1952-67 : See Hatkanangle Lok Sabha constituency
1977	Rajaram alias Balasaheb Shankarrao Mane	Indian National Congress
1980	Rajaram alias Balasaheb Shankarrao Mane	Indian National Congress
1984	Rajaram alias Balasaheb Shankarrao Mane	Indian National Congress
1989	Rajaram alias Balasaheb Shankarrao Mane	Indian National Congress
1991	Rajaram alias Balasaheb Shankarrao Mane	Indian National Congress
1996	Kallappa Awade	Indian National Congress
1998	Kallappa Awade	Indian National Congress
1999	Nivedita Mane	Nationalist Congress Party
2004	Nivedita Mane	Nationalist Congress Party
2008 onwards : See Hatkanangle Lok Sabha constituency

== Detailed Results ==
Vote share of Winning candidates
2004	53.38%
1999	43.37%
1998	48.02%
1996	34.44%
1991	70.61%
1989	42.67%
1984	53.78%
1980	59.26%
1977	54.29%

=== 2004 ===
2004 Indian general election: Ichalkaranji
Party	Candidate	Votes	%	±%
NCP	Mane Nivedita Sambhajirao	422,272	53.38	▲10.01
SS	Dr. Patil Sanjay (Dada) Shamrao	321,223	40.61	▲27.68
BBM	Kambale Sukumar Dattu	20,155	2.55	New entry
Independent	Mane Sunita Arvind	19,704	2.49	Steady
Independent	Patil Sanjay Shamrao	7,733	0.98	Steady
Majority		101,049	12.77	▲11.12
Turnout				
NCP hold		Swing		

=== 1999 ===
1999 Indian general election: Ichalkaranji
Party	Candidate	Votes	%	±%
NCP	Mane Nivedita Sambhajirao	337,657	43.37	New entry
INC	Awade Kallappa Baburao	324,845	41.72	▼6.30
SS	Bhau alias Pundlik Krishna Jadhav	100,697	12.93	▼33.39
Independent	Aitawade Vidyasagar Devappa	6,882	0.88	Steady
Independent	Sunita Arvind Mane	6,503	0.84	Steady
Independent	Mali Vasant Appaso	2,029	0.26	Steady
Majority		12,812	1.65	▼0.05
Turnout		810,963	72.62	▲5.99
NCP gain from INC		Swing		

=== 1998 ===
1998 Indian general election: Ichalkaranji
Party	Candidate	Votes	%	±%
INC	Awade Kallappa Baburao	344,817	48.02	▲13.58
SS	Nivedita Sambhajirao Mane	332,623	46.32	New entry
CPI(M)	Prof. Maya Pandit-Narkar	24,147	3.36	▼9.45
Independent	Aitawade Vidyasagar Devappa	6,662	0.93	Steady
Independent	Bandgar Appa Annapa	4,272	0.59	Steady
BSP	Prof. Pradnyavant Gautam	2,308	0.32	New entry
AIRJP	Dr. Puntambekar Shirish Ramkrishna	1,574	0.22	New entry
Independent	Kore Subhash Dinkar	1,105	0.15	Steady
Independent	Rangrao Laxman Gaikwad	559	0.08	Steady
Majority		12,194	1.70	▼2.44
Turnout		732,536	66.63	▲1.66
INC hold		Swing		

=== 1996 ===
1996 Indian general election: Ichalkaranji
Party	Candidate	Votes	%	±%
INC	Awade Kallappa Baburao	237,510	34.44	▼36.17
Independent	Nivedita Sambhajirao Mane	209,000	30.30	Steady
BJP	Ganpatrao Anandrao Sarnobat (Sarkar)	125,667	18.22	▲10.39
CPI(M)	K. L. Malabade	88,329	12.81	New entry
Independent	Aitavade Vidyasagar Devappa	8,756	1.27	Steady
JP	Desai Shamrao Tukaram	5,166	0.75	New entry
Independent	Patil Annasaheb Babgonda	3,368	0.49	Steady
Independent	Musale Bhupal Nayaku (B.A.)	3,276	0.47	Steady
Independent	Mudgal Namdeo Tatoba	2,482	0.36	Steady
Independent	Gaikwad Rangrao Laxman	2,133	0.31	Steady
Independent	Khatri Chandanmal Jivavlal	1,872	0.27	Steady
Independent	Dhotare Tatoba Nivrutti	1,247	0.18	Steady
Independent	Shirish Ramkrishna Puntambekar	917	0.13	Steady
Majority		28,510	4.14	▼46.19
Turnout		710,691	64.97	▲11.60
INC hold		Swing		

=== 1991 ===
1991 Indian general election: Ichalkaranji
Party	Candidate	Votes	%	±%
INC	Rajaram Shankarrao Mane	360,679	70.61	▲27.94
JD	Sultanpure Sadashiv Virupaksha	103,620	20.28	▼3.10
BJP	Vora Subhash Babubhai	40,007	7.83	New entry
Independent	Kulkarni Vasant Vinayak	2,071	0.41	Steady
DDP	Ramlakhan Varma	1,756	0.34	▲0.07
Independent	Kamble Sunil Dattu	1,710	0.33	Steady
Independent	Bauchakar P. D.	989	0.19	Steady
Majority		257,059	50.33	▲39.02
Turnout		518,511	53.37	▼16.76
INC hold		Swing		

=== 1989 ===
1989 Indian general election: Ichalkaranji
Party	Candidate	Votes	%	±%
INC	Rajaram Shankarrao Mane	275,674	42.67	▼11.11
Independent	Appasahed alias S. R. Patil	202,584	31.36	Steady
JD	Patil Shankar Dhondi	151,015	23.38	New entry
Independent	Sukumar Dattu Kamable	6,473	1.00	Steady
Independent	Swami Shivaling Anaiya	4,911	0.76	Steady
Independent	Mahadik Rajaram Dinkar	3,615	0.56	Steady
DDP	Mourya Ramraksha Muneshwar	1,758	0.27	New entry
Majority		73,090	11.31	▲2.78
Turnout		657,923	70.13	▲0.10
INC hold		Swing		

=== 1984 ===
1984 Indian general election: Ichalkaranji
Party	Candidate	Votes	%	±%
INC	Rajaram Shankarrao Mane	278,457	53.78	▼5.48
IC(S)	Kadambande Rajvardhan Raghujirao	234,319	45.25	New entry
Independent	Bhosale Sivaji Bharat	3,325	0.64	Steady
Independent	Mali Shamrao Govind	1,674	0.32	Steady
Majority		44,138	8.53	▼25.13
Turnout		529,006	70.03	▲3.12
INC hold		Swing		

=== 1980 ===
1980 Indian general election: Ichalkaranji
Party	Candidate	Votes	%	±%
INC(I)	Rajaram Shankarrao Mane	265,903	59.26	New entry
INC(U)	Patil Balasaheb Krishnarao Kaulavkar	114,852	25.60	New entry
JP	Desai Kakaso Gopalrao	67,960	15.15	▼30.56
Majority		151,051	33.66	▲25.08
Turnout		459,320	66.91	▼2.51
INC(I) gain from INC		Swing		

=== 1977 ===
1977 Indian general election: Ichalkaranji
Party	Candidate	Votes	%	±%
INC	Rajaram Shankarrao Mane	211,309	54.29	New entry
JP	Desai Kakasaheb Gopalrao	177,945	45.71	New entry
Majority		33,364	8.58	New entry
Turnout		399,422	69.42	New entry
INC win (new seat)				

== See also ==
- Hatkanangle Lok Sabha constituency
- Ichalkaranji
- List of constituencies of the Lok Sabha
