= Prakashanna Awade =

Indian politician

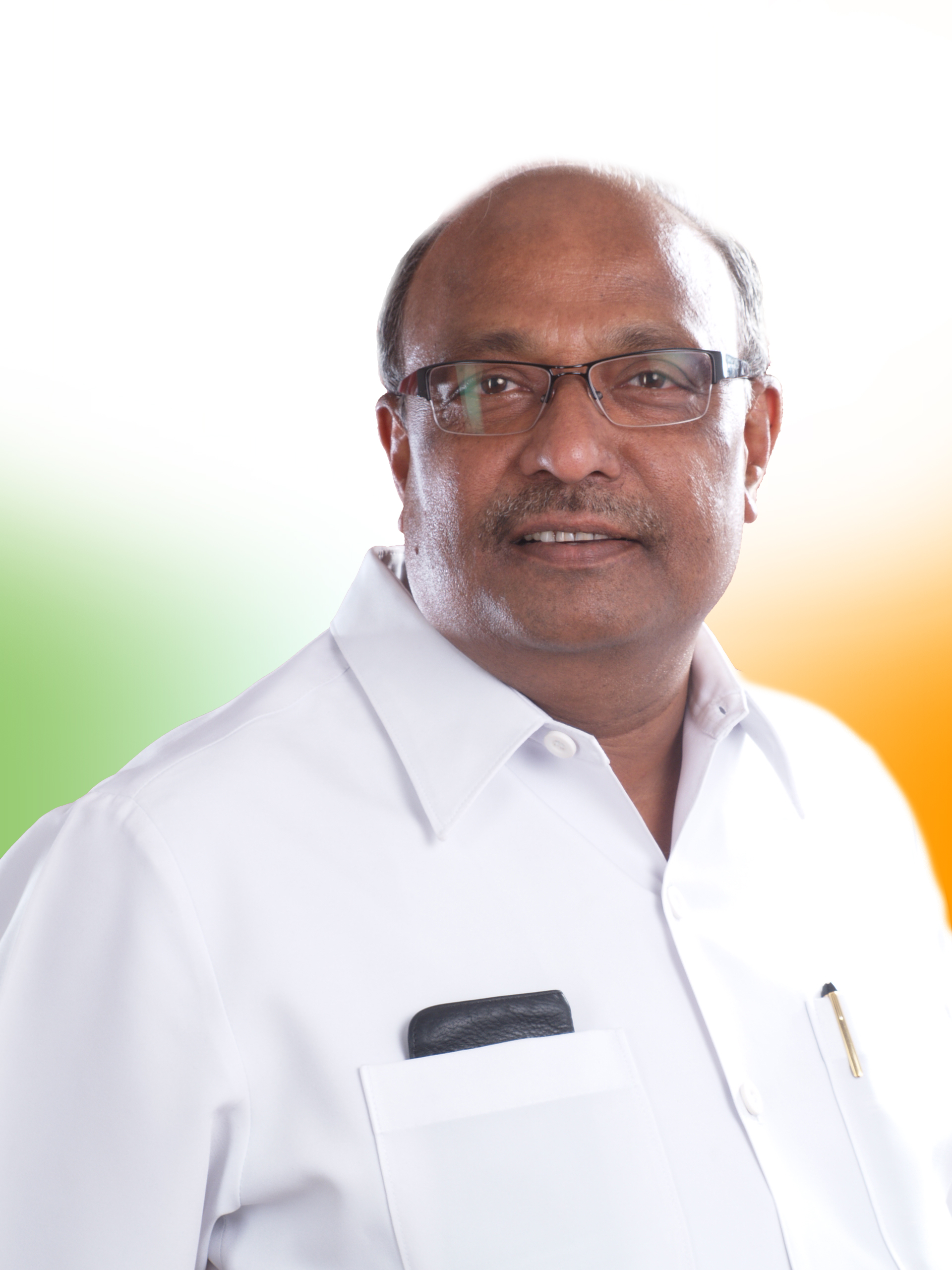

Member of Maharashtra Legislative Assembly
- In office (1995-1999),(1999-2004),(2004-2009),(2019 – 2024)
- Preceded by: K. L. Malabade
- Succeeded by: Rahul Prakashanna Awade
- Constituency: Ichalkaranji

Personal details
- Born: March 15, 1953 (age 73) At.Ichalkaranji, Kolhapur district
- Party: Bharatiya Janata Party (2024–present)
- Other political affiliations: Indian National Congress (Before 2024)
- Spouse: Smt. Koshori Awade
- Children: Rahul Prakashanna Awade
- Parent: Kallappa Awade (Father)
- Education: 10th Pass SSC From Maharashtra State Secondary Education, Pune, 1968-69, Govindrao Highschool, Ichalkaranji
- Occupation: Farmer And Social Worker

Prakash Kallappa Awade is a leading Independent and a member of the Maharashtra Legislative Assembly elected from Ichalkaranji Assembly constituency in Kolhapur city.

He Joined BJP in the presence of Union Home Minister Amit Shah and Maharashtra Deputy Chief Minister Devendra Fadnavis in Kolhapur on 25 September 2024.

== Positions held ==
- 1995: Elected to Maharashtra Legislative Assembly.
- 1999: Elected to Maharashtra Legislative Assembly.
- 2004: Elected to Maharashtra Legislative Assembly.
- 2019: Elected to Maharashtra Legislative Assembly.
