= Satyajit Deshmukh =

Indian politician

Satyajit Shivajirao Deshmukh

Member of the Maharashtra Legislative Assembly
- Incumbent
- Assumed office 23 November 2024
- Preceded by: Mansing Fattesingrao Naik
- Constituency: Shirala

Personal details
- Born: 11 October 1973 (age 52)
- Party: Bharatiya Janata Party
- Spouse: Adv. Renuka Deshmukh
- Children: Saitejaswi Deshmukh
- Parent(s): Shivajirao Deshmukh, Sarojini Shivajirao Deshmukh
- Profession: Politician

Satyajit Shivajirao Deshmukh is an Indian politician from Maharashtra. He won as an MLA in the 2024 Maharashtra Legislative Assembly elections representing Bharatiya Janata Party from the Shirala Assembly constituency in Sangli district.

== See also ==
- List of chief ministers of Maharashtra
- Maharashtra Legislative Assembly
