= Swabhimani Paksha =

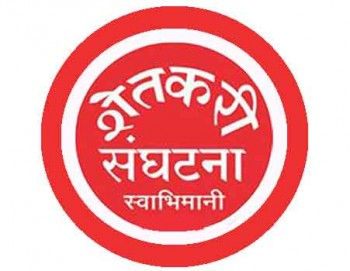
- Chairman: Raju Shetti
- Founded: 2004
- Ideology: Conservative liberalism
- Political position: Centre-right
- Alliance: UPA (2018- 2023) (National Level); MVA (2020 - 2023) (Maharashtra)
- Seats in Maharashtra Legislative Assembly: 0 / 288

Website
- www.swabhimani.com

Swabhimani Paksha is a political party in Maharashtra, India, formed by Raju Shetti, as a political wing of the Swabhimani Shetkari Saghtana after its split from the Shetkari Sanghatana led by Sharad Joshi in 2004. In 2004, Raju Shetti was elected to the Maharashtra Vidhan Sabha from Shirol constituency as a Swabhimani Paksha candidate. Later, he was elected to the 15th Lok Sabha in 2009 from Hatkanangle constituency. In 2019, Devendra Mahadevrao Bhuyar was elected to the Maharashtra Vidhan Sabha from Morshi constituency as a Swabhimani Paksha candidate.

The party joined the Bharatiya Janata Party led National Democratic Alliance in 2014 and won one seat in the 2014 Indian general election when Shetti was elected. In 2024 the party failed to win any seat.
