= Sujit Minchekar =

Indian politician

Dr. Sujit Minchekar

Member of Legislative Assembly of Maharashtra
- In office 2009–2019
- Constituency: Hatkanangale

Personal details
- Party: Shiv Sena

Sujit Minchekar is an Indian politician from Kolhapur district, Maharashtra. He is currently the Member of Legislative Assembly from Hatkanangale Vidhan Sabha constituency of Kolhapur, Maharashtra, India as a member of Shiv Sena. He has been elected for two consecutive terms in the Maharashtra Legislative Assembly for 2009 & 2014.

== Positions held ==
- 2009: Elected to Maharashtra Legislative Assembly (1st term)
- 2014: Re-Elected to Maharashtra Legislative Assembly (2nd term)
