= Swabhimani Shetkari Saghtana =

Swabhimani Shetkari Saghtana स्वभिमानी शेतकरी संघटना
- Chairman: Raju Shetti
- Alliance: UPA (2019)

Website
- http://www.swabhimani.com/

Swabhimani Shetkari Saghtana or SSS (Marathi: स्वभिमानी शेतकरी संघटना) is a farmers union based in Kolhapur, Maharashtra, India. It was founded by Member of Parliament, Raju Shetti.

They fight for the fair price of sugarcane farmer and other issues.

As of January 2014, Swabhimani Shetakari Sanghatana is part of the state's governing grand alliance, led by Shiv Sena and the Bhartiya Janata Party.

On 28 September 2015, the SSS was one of 16 parties in Maharashtra to lose its registration for not submitting audited balance sheets and IT return documents since 2005. Thus they have lost their official election symbols.

Raju Shetti, once allied with the NDA, became a vocal critic of the Modi and Fadnavis governments, leading him to quit the alliance in 2017. He later aligned with Sharad Pawar’s NCP for the 2019 elections, but this move backfired when he lost the Hatkanangale seat to Shiv Sena’s Dhairyasheel Mane in a major upset.
