= 1998 Indian general election in Maharashtra =

- 16, 22 and 18 February 1998
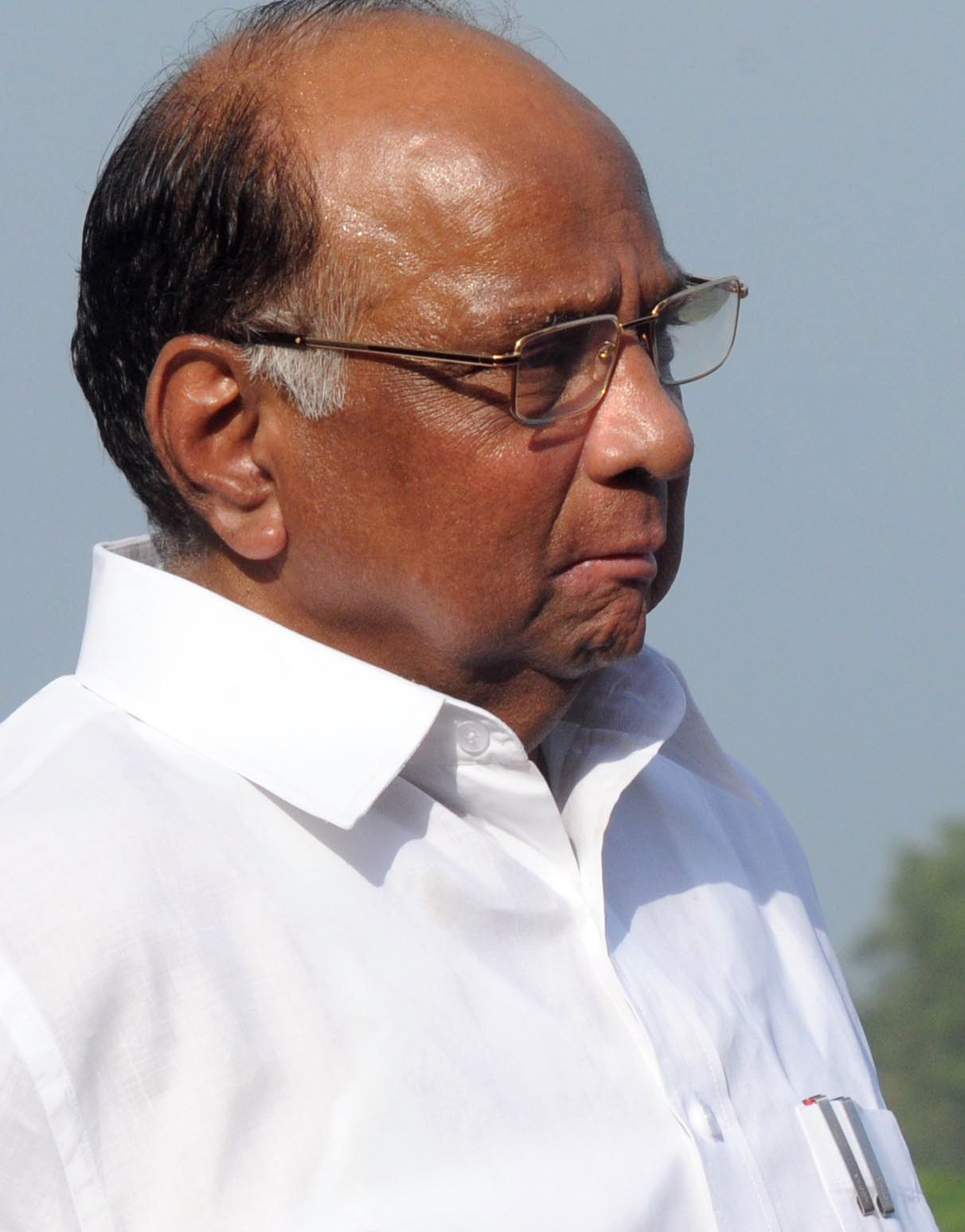

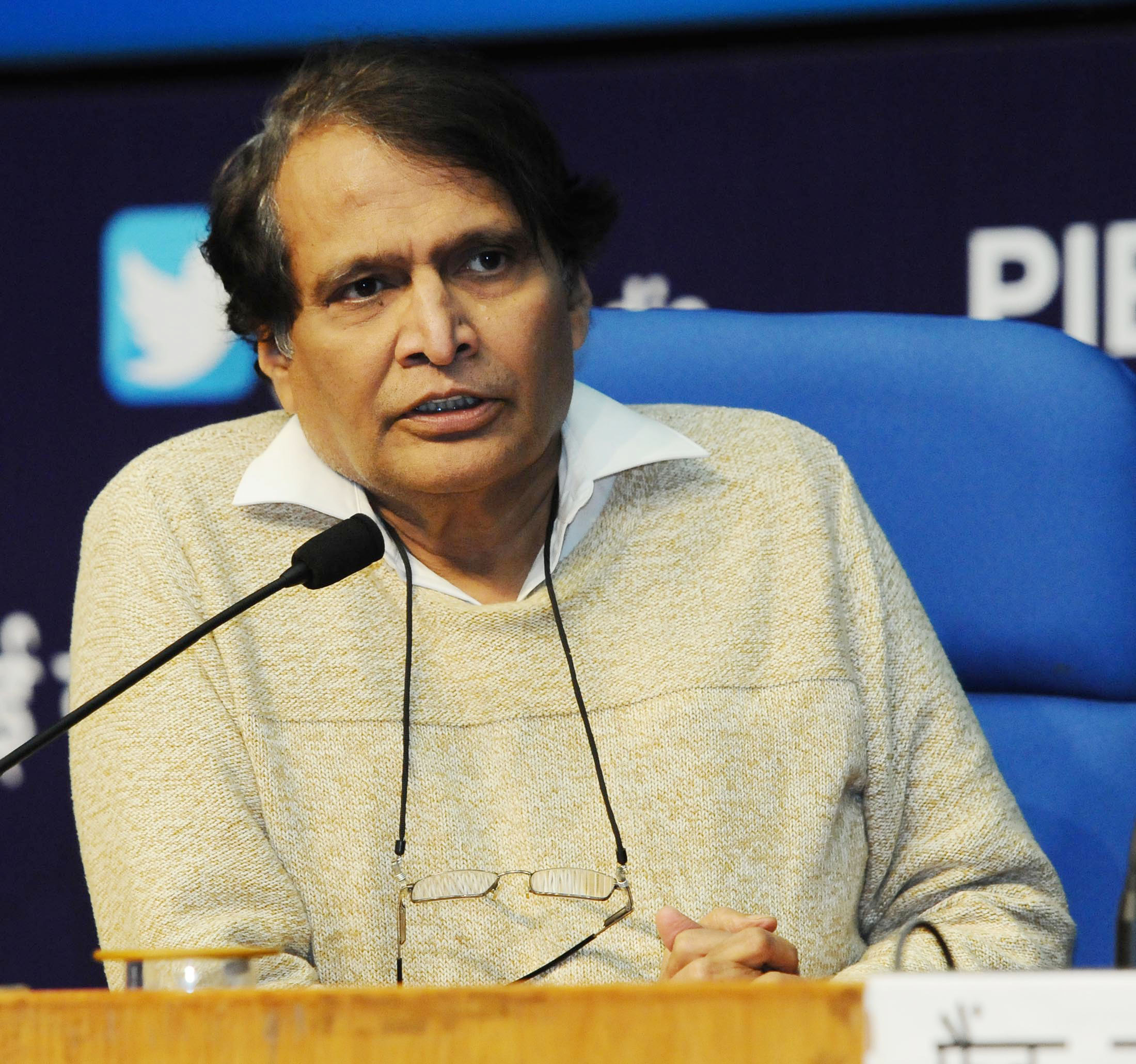

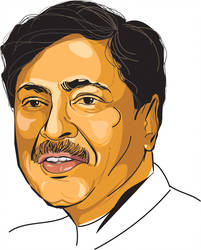
	Majority party	Minority party	Third party
Leader	Sharad Pawar	Suresh Prabhu	Pramod Mahajan
Party	INC	SS	BJP
Leader's seat	Baramati	Rajapur	Mumbai North East (lost)
Seats before	15	15	18
Seats won	33	6	4
Seat change	▲18	▼9	▼14
- Maharashtra
Prime Minister before election
I. K. Gujral
JD
Prime Minister after election
A. B. Vajpayee
BJP

The 1998 Indian general election in Maharashtra was held in three phases on 16, 22 and 18 February 1998.

These were held for 48 seats with the state going to polls in the first three phases of the general elections. The major contenders in the state were the National Democratic Alliance (NDA) and the Indian National Congress.

The Indian National Congress won a landslide victory in the 1998 Indian general election in Maharashtra.

== Parties and alliances ==
=== National Democratic Alliance ===
Party	Flag	Symbol	Leader	Seats contested
Bharatiya Janata Party			Pramod Mahajan	25
Shiv Sena			Suresh Prabhu	22
Pune Vikas Aghadi			Suresh Kalmadi	1
Total				48

=== Congress Alliance ===
Party	Flag	Symbol	Leader	Seats contested
Indian National Congress			Sharad Pawar	41
Republican Party of India			Prakash Ambedkar	4
Samajwadi Party			Mulayam Singh Yadav	3
Total				48

== List of Candidates ==
Constituency		INC+		NDA	
#	Name	Party	Candidate	Party	Candidate
1	Rajapur	INC	Macchindra Kambli	SS	Suresh Prabhu
2	Ratnagiri	INC	Nana Joshi	SS	Anant Geete
3	Kolaba	INC	A. R. Antulay	SS	Anant Tare
4	Mumbai South	INC	Murli Deora	BJP	Jayawantiben Mehta
5	Mumbai South Central	SP	Suhail Lokhandwala	SS	Mohan Rawale
6	Mumbai North Central	RPI	Ramdas Athawale	SS	Narayan Athawale
7	Mumbai North East	INC	Gurudas Kamat	BJP	Pramod Mahajan
8	Mumbai North West	SP	Tushar Gandhi	SS	Madhukar Sarpotdar
9	Mumbai North	INC	Ram Pandagle Jankiram	BJP	Ram Naik
10	Thane	SP	Kenia Chandrika Premji	SS	Prakash Paranjape
11	Dahanu (ST)	INC	Shankar Sakharam	BJP	Chintaman Vanaga
12	Nashik	INC	Madhavrao Patil	SS	Rajaram Godse
13	Malegaon (ST)	INC	Zamru Kahandole	BJP	Kacharu Bhau Raut
14	Dhule (ST)	INC	D. S. Ahire	BJP	Ramdas Rupla Gavit
15	Nandurbar (ST)	INC	Manikrao Hodlya Gavit	BJP	Kuwarsing Valvi
16	Erandol	INC	Vijaykumar Patil	BJP	Annasaheb M. K. Patil
17	Jalgaon	INC	Ulhas Vasudeo Patil	BJP	Gunwantrao Sarode
18	Buldhana (SC)	INC	Mukul Wasnik	SS	Anandrao Adsul
19	Akola	RPI	Prakash Ambedkar	BJP	Pandurang Fundkar
20	Washim	INC	Sudhakarrao Naik	SS	Shewale Dnyaneshwar
21	Amravati	RPI	R. S. Gavai	SS	Anant Gudhe
22	Ramtek	INC	Rani Chitralekha Bhonsle	SS	Gujar Ashok Yashwantrao
23	Nagpur	INC	Vilas Muttemwar	BJP	M. Ramesh Manaklal
24	Bhandara	INC	Praful Patel	BJP	Narayandas Durgaprasadji
25	Chimur	RPI	Jogendra Kawade	BJP	Namdeo Diwathe
26	Chandrapur	INC	Nareshkumar Puglia	BJP	Hansraj Gangaram Ahir
27	Wardha	INC	Datta Meghe	BJP	Vijay Mude
28	Yavatmal	INC	Uttamrao Deorao Patil	BJP	Rajabhau Thakre
29	Hingoli	INC	Suryakanta Patil	SS	Shivaji Mane
30	Nanded	INC	Bhaskarrao Patil	BJP	Dhanajirao Deshmukh
31	Parbhani	INC	Suresh Warpudkar	SS	Suresh Jadhav
32	Jalna	INC	Ganpatrao Bangar	BJP	Uttamsingh Pawar
33	Aurangabad	INC	Ramkrishna Baba Patil	SS	Pradeep Jaiswal
34	Beed	INC	Ashok Patil	BJP	Jaisingrao Patil
35	Latur	INC	Shivraj Patil	BJP	Gopalrao Patil
36	Osmanabad (SC)	INC	Arvind Kamble	SS	Shivaji Kamble
37	Sholapur	INC	Sushilkumar Shinde	BJP	Lingaraj Valyal
38	Pandharpur (SC)	INC	Sandipan Thorat	BJP	Chagdeo Sukhdeo Kamble
39	Ahmednagar	INC	Maruti Devram	SS	Balasaheb V. Patil
40	Kopargaon	INC	Prasad Tanpure	BJP	Bhimrao Badade
41	Khed	INC	Ashok Mohol	SS	Nana Balkawade
42	Pune	INC	Vitthal Tupe	IND	Suresh Kalmadi
43	Baramati	INC	Sharad Pawar	BJP	Kakade Viraj Babulal
44	Satara	INC	Abhaysinh Shahumaharaj	SS	Hindurao Nimbalkar
45	Karad	INC	Prithviraj Chavan	SS	Jayawantrao Bhosale
46	Sangli	INC	Madan Patil	BJP	Ramchandra Dange Anna
47	Ichalkaranji	INC	Kallappa Awade	SS	Nivedita Mane
48	Kolhapur	INC	Sadashivrao Mandlik	SS	Ghatge Vikramsinh Jaisingrao

== Results ==
=== Results by Party/Alliance ===
Alliance/ Party		Popular vote			Seats		
Alliance/ Party		Votes	%	±pp	Contested	Won	+/−
INC+	INC	1,37,44,283	43.64	▲8.86	41	33	▲18
INC+	RPI	13,03,549	4.14	▼0.78	4	4	▲4
INC+	SP	8,25,848	2.62	▲0.56	3	0	Steady
INC+	Total	1,58,73,680	50.40	Steady	48	37	▲22
NDA	BJP	70,81,064	22.49	▲1.31	25	4	▼18
NDA	SHS	61,90,443	19.66	▲2.83	22	6	▼9
NDA	IND	3,41,697	1.09	Steady	1	0	Steady
NDA	Total	1,36,13,204	43.24	Steady	48	10	▼23
PWPI		2,69,609	0.86	▼0.68	2	1	▲1
JD		5,25,250	1.67	▼1.63	19	0	Steady
Others		7,85,767	2.48	Steady	89	0	Steady
IND		4,24,780	1.34	▼6.37	171	0	Steady
Total		3,14,92,290	100%	-	377	48	-

=== List of Elected MPs: ===
Constituency		Winner				Runner Up				Margin	%
#	Name	Candidate	Party	Votes	%	Candidate	Party	Votes	%	Margin	%
1	Rajapur	Suresh Prabhu	SHS	217,766	50.37	Macchindra Kambli	INC	152,724	35.33	65,042	15.04
2	Ratnagiri	Anant Geete	SHS	238,928	49.38	Nishikant Alias Nana Joshi	INC	207,694	42.93	31,234	6.45
3	Kolaba	Ramsheth Thakur	PWPI	248,353	35.16	A. R. Antulay	INC	239,227	33.87	9,126	1.29
4	Mumbai South	Murli Deora	INC	178,597	52.59	Jaywantiben Mehta	BJP	157,532	46.39	21,065	6.20
5	Mumbai South Central	Mohan Vishnu Rawale	SHS	171,376	43.14	Suhail Lokhandwala	SP	171,223	43.10	153	0.04
6	Mumbai North Central	Ramdas Athawale	RPI	282,373	50.18	Narayan Athawalay	SHS	257,141	45.69	25,232	4.49
7	Mumbai North East	Gurudas Kamat	INC	525,911	51.07	Pramod Mahajan	BJP	478,459	46.46	47,452	4.61
8	Mumbai North West	Madhukar Sirpotdar	SHS	370,229	47.47	Tushar Gandhi	SP	350,994	45.00	19,235	2.47
9	Mumbai North	Ram Naik	BJP	531,417	52.10	Ram Pandagle Jankiram	INC	456,400	44.75	75,017	7.35
10	Thane	Prakash Paranjape	SHS	553,210	59.21	Chandrika Premji Kenia	SP	303,631	32.50	249,579	26.71
11	Dahanu (ST)	Nam Shankar Sakharam	INC	245,567	43.51	Chintaman Wanaga	BJP	211,009	37.39	34,558	6.12
12	Nashik	Madhav Balwant Patil	INC	381,300	57.19	Rajaram Parashram Godse	SHS	278,908	41.83	102,392	15.36
13	Malegaon (ST)	Zamru Manglu Kahandole	INC	215,846	42.88	Raut Kacharu Bhau	BJP	154,650	30.72	61,196	12.16
14	Dhule (ST)	D. S. Ahire	INC	274,034	55.79	Ramdas Rupla Gavit	BJP	216,348	44.04	57,686	11.75
15	Nandurbar (ST)	Manikrao Hodlya Gavit	INC	304,134	53.65	Kuwarsing Valvi	BJP	238,423	42.06	65,711	11.59
16	Erandol	Annasaheb M. K. Patil	BJP	286,178	51.87	Patil Vijay Naval	INC	261,342	47.37	24,836	4.50
17	Jalgaon	Dr. Ulhas Vasudeo Patil	INC	339,980	54.40	Gunwantrao Rambhau Sarode	BJP	283,166	45.31	56,814	9.09
18	Buldhana (SC)	Mukul Wasnik	INC	348,094	51.82	Anandrao Adsul	SHS	294,537	43.85	53,557	7.97
19	Akola	Prakash Ambedkar	RPI	366,427	50.64	Pandurang Fundkar	BJP	333,645	46.11	32,782	4.53
20	Washim	Sudhakarrao Naik	INC	359,742	57.23	Dr. Dnyaneshwar Keshaorao Shewale	SHS	251,152	39.96	108,590	17.27
21	Amravati	R. S. Gavai	RPI	304,746	49.76	Anant Gudhe	SHS	290,887	47.50	13,859	2.26
22	Ramtek	Rani Chitralekha Bhonsle	INC	325,885	52.02	Gujar Ashok Yashwantrao	SHS	258,847	41.32	67,038	10.70
23	Nagpur	Vilas Muttemwar	INC	486,928	57.41	Mantri Ramesh Manaklal	BJP	323,646	38.16	163,282	19.25
24	Bhandara	Patel Praful Manohar Bhai	INC	324,542	49.13	Narayandas Durgaprasadji Saraf	BJP	305,236	46.21	19,306	2.92
25	Chimur	Prof. Jogendra Kawade	RPI	350,003	47.46	Diwathe Namdeo Harbaji	BJP	347,881	47.17	2,122	0.29
26	Chandrapur	Puglia Nareshkumar Chunnalal	INC	450,007	55.93	Ahir Hansraj Gangaram	BJP	299,652	37.25	150,355	18.68
27	Wardha	Datta Meghe	INC	328,905	48.47	Mude Vijay Annaji	BJP	245,822	36.22	83,083	12.25
28	Yavatmal	Uttamrao Deorao Patil	INC	291,415	47.71	Rajabhau Thakare	BJP	236,742	38.76	54,673	8.95
29	Hingoli	Suryakanta Patil	INC	345,439	52.53	Shivaji Mane	SHS	267,773	40.72	77,666	11.81
30	Nanded	Patil Bhaskarrao Bapurao	INC	337,744	47.81	Dr. Dhanajirao Deshmukh	BJP	290,457	41.11	47,287	6.70
31	Parbhani	Suresh Warpudkar	INC	320,415	52.69	Suresh Jadhav	SHS	274,922	45.21	45,493	7.48
32	Jalna	Uttamsingh Pawar	BJP	290,312	46.83	Bangar Dnyandeo Ganpatrao	INC	288,504	46.54	1,808	0.29
33	Aurangabad	Ramkrishna Baba Patil	INC	408,168	50.96	Jaiswal Pradeep Shivnarayan	SHS	378,042	47.20	30,126	3.76
34	Beed	Jaisingrao Gaikwad Patil	BJP	300,307	46.45	Ashok Patil	INC	294,204	45.50	6,103	0.95
35	Latur	Patil Shivraj Vishwanath	INC	322,265	45.53	Dr. Gopalrao Patil	BJP	318,938	45.06	3,327	0.47
36	Osmanabad (SC)	Arvind Tulshiram Kamble	INC	280,592	52.81	Kamble Shivaji Vittalrao	SHS	233,574	43.96	47,018	8.85
37	Sholapur	Sushilkumar Shinde	INC	336,346	55.44	Valyal Lingraj Balraiyya	BJP	231,974	38.23	104,372	17.21
38	Pandharpur (SC)	Thorat Sandipan Bhagwan	INC	313,676	54.84	Prof. Chagdeo Sukhdeo Kamble	BJP	216,244	37.81	97,432	17.03
39	Ahmednagar	Balasaheb Vikhe Patil	SHS	323,024	49.33	Maruti Devram Alias Dada Patil Shelke	INC	308,779	47.15	14,245	2.18
40	Kopargaon	Tanpure Prasad Baburao	INC	335,730	56.29	Bhimrao Badade	BJP	256,490	43.00	79,240	13.29
41	Khed	Mohol Ashok Namdeorao	INC	349,470	56.72	Nana Balkawade	SHS	248,040	40.26	101,430	16.46
42	Pune	Tupe Vitthal Baburao	INC	434,915	52.79	Suresh Kalmadi	IND	341,697	41.48	93,218	11.31
43	Baramati	Sharad Pawar	INC	529,059	65.81	Kakade Viraj Babulal	BJP	260,875	32.45	268,184	33.36
44	Satara	Abhaysinh Shahumaharaj Bhosale	INC	389,238	65.20	Hindurao Naik Nimbalkar	SHS	207,762	34.80	181,476	30.40
45	Karad	Prithviraj Chavan	INC	399,797	62.01	Bhosale Jayawantrao Krishna	SHS	226,890	35.19	172,907	26.82
46	Sangli	Patil Madan Vishwanath	INC	338,900	55.59	Dange Anna (Ramchandra Mahadev)	BJP	265,661	43.58	73,239	12.01
47	Ichalkaranji	Awade Kallappa Baburao	INC	344,817	48.02	Nivedita Sambhajirao Mane	SHS	332,623	46.32	12,194	1.70
48	Kolhapur	Mandlik Sadashiv Rao Dadoba	INC	367,951	51.66	Ghatge Vikramsinh Jaisingrao	SHS	306,353	43.01	61,598	8.65

== Region-wise results ==
Region	Seats	Indian National Congress	Shiv Sena	Bharatiya Janata Party	Others
Vidarbha	11	08	00	00	03
Western Maharashtra	11	10	01	00	00
Marathwada	08	06	00	02	00
Mumbai	06	02	02	01	01
Thane+Konkan	05	04	00	01	00
North Maharashtra		00	03	00	01
	48	33	06	04	05

== Post-election Union Council of Ministers from Maharashtra ==
#	Name	Constituency	Designation	Department	From	To	Party
1	Suresh Prabhu	Rajapur	Cabinet Minister	Environment and Forests	19 March 1998	13 October 1999	SS
2	Ram Jethmalani	Rajya Sabha	Cabinet Minister	Urban Development	19 March 1998	8 June 1999	IND
2	Ram Jethmalani	Rajya Sabha	Cabinet Minister	Law, Justice and Company Affairs	8 June 1999	13 October 1999	IND
3	Pramod Mahajan	Rajya Sabha	Cabinet Minister	Information and Broadcasting	5 December 1998	13 October 1999	BJP
3	Pramod Mahajan	Rajya Sabha	Cabinet Minister	Food Processing Industries	3 February 1999	13 October 1999	BJP
4	Ram Naik	Mumbai North	MoS	Railways	19 March 1998	6 August 1999	BJP
4	Ram Naik	Mumbai North	MoS	Parliamentary Affairs	20 March 1998	5 May 1999	BJP
4	Ram Naik	Mumbai North	MoS	Planning and Programme Implementation	20 April 1998	13 October 1999	BJP
4	Ram Naik	Mumbai North	MoS	Home Affairs	5 May 1999	13 October 1999	BJP
4	Ram Naik	Mumbai North	MoS (I/C)	Railways	6 August 1999	13 October 1999	BJP
