= 1999 Indian general election in Maharashtra =

- 5 and 11 September 1999
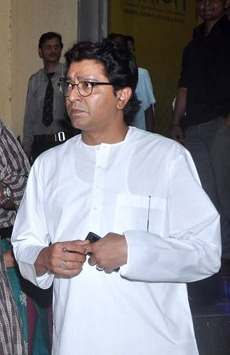

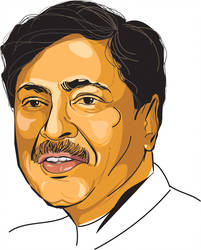

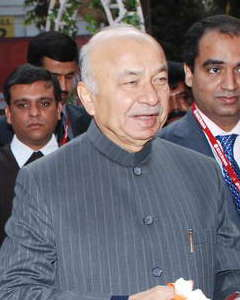

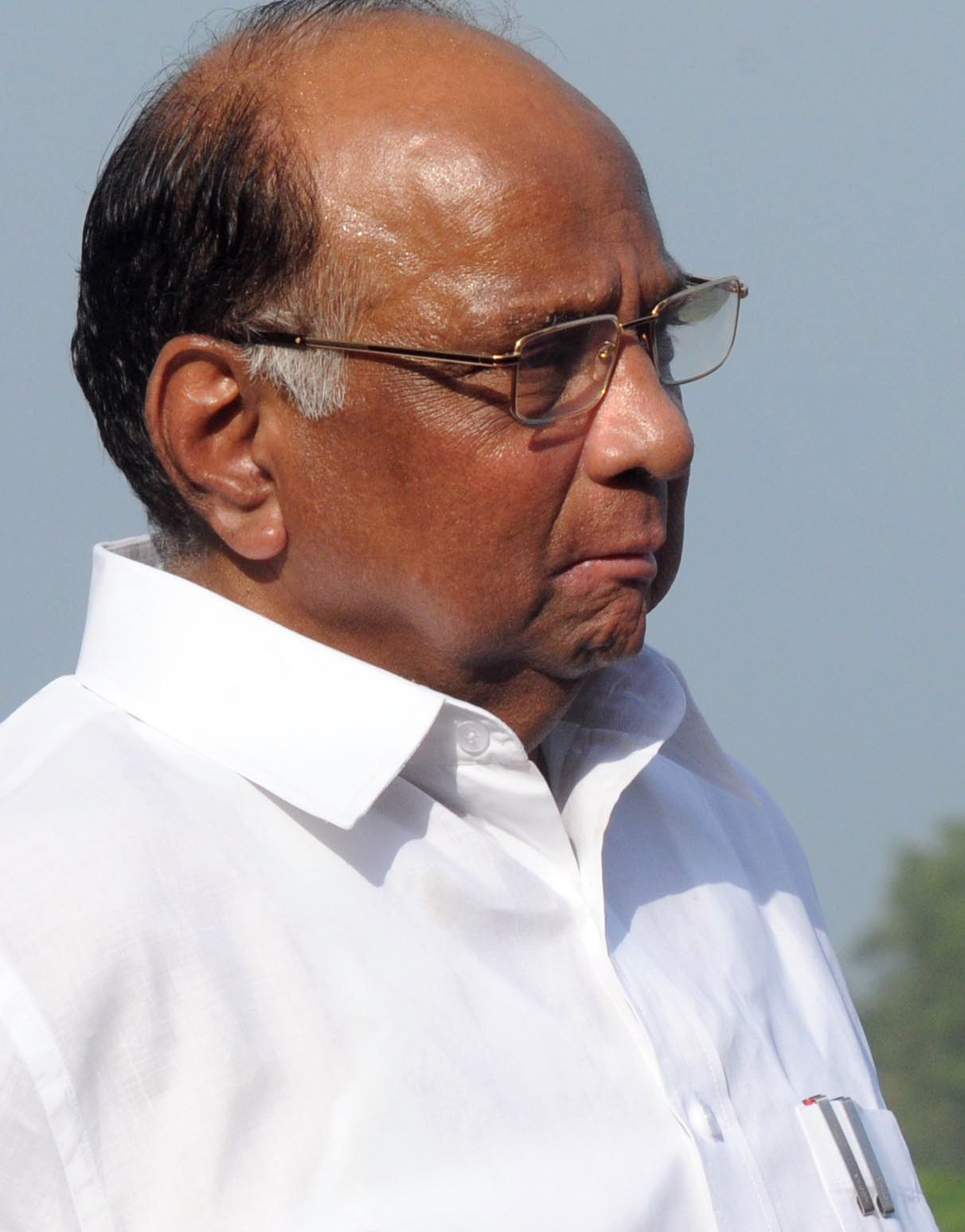
	Majority party	Minority party
Leader	Raj Thackeray	Pramod Mahajan
Party	SS	BJP
Alliance	NDA	NDA
Seats before	6	4
Seats won	15	13
Seat change	▲9	▲9
Popular vote	55,67,484	69,95,634
Percentage	16.86%	21.18%
Swing	▼2.80	▼1.31
	Third party	Fourth party
Leader	Sushilkumar Shinde	Sharad Pawar
Party	INC	NCP
Alliance	INC+	NCP+
Seats before	33	Party established
Seats won	10	6
Seat change	▼23	▲6
Popular vote	98,12,144	71,26,760
Percentage	29.71	21.58
Swing	▼13.93	▲21.58
- Maharashtra
Prime Minister before election
A. B. Vajpayee
BJP
Prime Minister after election
A. B. Vajpayee
BJP

The 1999 Indian general election in Maharashtra was held in two phases on 5 and 11 September 1999.

These were held for 48 seats with the state going to polls in the first two phases of the general elections. The major contenders in the state were the Congress Alliance and National Democratic Alliance (NDA) and Nationalist Congress Party led Alliance.

== Election schedule ==
The polling schedule for the 1999 General Elections was announced by the Chief Election Commissioner on 11 July 1999.

Poll event	Phase	
Poll event	I	II
Notification date	11 August 1999	17 August 1999
Last date for filing nomination	18 August 1999	24 August 1999
Scrutiny of nomination	19 August 1999	25 August 1999
Last Date for withdrawal of nomination	21 August 1999	27 August 1999
Date of poll	5 September 1999	11 September 1999
Date of counting of votes/Result	6 October 1999	
No. of constituencies	24	24

== Parties and alliances ==
=== National Democratic Alliance ===
National Democratic Alliance
Party	Flag	Symbol	Leader	Seats
Bharatiya Janata Party			Pramod Mahajan	26
Shiv Sena			Raj Thackeray	22
Total				48

=== Congress Alliance ===
Congress led Alliance
Party	Flag	Symbol	Leader	Seats
Indian National Congress			Sushilkumar Shinde	42
Bharipa Bahujan Mahasangh			Prakash Ambedkar	4
Republican Party of India			Jogendra Kawade	2
Total				48

=== Nationalist Congress Alliance ===
NCP led Alliance
Party	Flag	Symbol	Leader	Seats
Nationalist Congress Party			Sharad Pawar	38
Republican Party of India (Athawale)			Ramdas Athawale	4
Janata Dal (Secular) (Note: This Symbol was used by JD(S) until 2001)			H. D. Deve Gowda	2
Samajwadi Party			Mulayam Singh Yadav	2
Peasants and Workers Party of India				2
Total				48

- NOTE: RPI(A) contested as Independents

== List of Candidates ==
Constituency		NDA		INC+		NCP+	
No.	Name	Party	Candidate	Party	Candidate	Party	Candidate
1	Rajapur	SS	Suresh Prabhu	INC	Sudhir Sawant	JD(S)	Madhu Dandavate
2	Ratnagiri	SS	Anant Geete	INC	Rajaram Shinde	NCP	Ziman Sujit Bhagoji
3	Kolaba	SS	D. B. Patil	INC	Sable Pushpa Tukaram	PWPI	Ramsheth Thakur
4	Mumbai South	BJP	Jayawanti Mehta	INC	Murli Deora	SP	Aziz Lalani
5	Mumbai South Central	SS	Mohan Vishnu Rawale	BBM	Dada Samant	SP	Majeed Memon
6	Mumbai North Central	SS	Manohar Joshi	BBM	Raja Dhale	Ind.	B. C. Kamble
7	Mumbai North East	BJP	Kirit Somaiya	INC	Gurudas Kamat	NCP	Dr. Rammanohar Tripathi
8	Mumbai North West	SS	Madhukar Sirpotdar	INC	Sunil Dutt	NCP	Ramesh Dube
9	Mumbai North	BJP	Ram Naik	INC	Chandrakant Gosalia	Ind.	Damodar Janardan Tandel
10	Thane	SS	Prakash Vishvanath Paranjape	INC	Nakul Patil	NCP	Prabhakar Hegade
11	Dahanu (ST)	BJP	Chintaman Vanaga	INC	Damodar Barku Shingada	NCP	Nam Shankar Sakharam
12	Nashik	SS	Uttamrao Dhikale	INC	Gulave Gopalrao Ravlaji	NCP	Patil Madhav Balwant
13	Malegaon (ST)	BJP	Gangurde Babanrao Lahanu	INC	Zamru Manglu Kahandole	JD(S)	Haribahu Shankar Mahale
14	Dhule (ST)	BJP	Ramdas Rupla Gavit	INC	Bapu Hari Chaure	NCP	Ahire D. S. Ahire Saheb
15	Nandurbar (ST)	BJP	Kuwarsing Fulji Valvi	INC	Manikrao Hodlya Gavit	NCP	Vasave Govind Ramu
16	Erandol	BJP	Annasaheb M. K. Patil	INC	Prof. V. G. Patil	NCP	More Vasantrao Jivanrao
17	Jalgaon	BJP	Y. G. Mahajan	INC	Dr. Ulhas Vasudeo Patil	NCP	Mahajan Jivram Tukaram
18	Buldhana (SC)	SS	Anandrao Vithoba Adsul	INC	Mukul Wasnik	NCP	Sardar Sahebrao Ashruji
19	Akola	BJP	Pandurang Fundkar	BBM	Prakash Yashwant Ambedkar	NCP	Korpe Dr. Santoshkumar Wamanrao
20	Washim	SS	Bhavana Gawali	INC	Anantrao Vithhalrao Deshmukh	NCP	Prof. Javed Khan
21	Amravati	SS	Anant Gudhe	RPI	R. S. Gavai	NCP	Dr. Kale Mohan Natthuji
22	Ramtek	SS	Mohite Subodh Baburao	INC	Banwarilal Purohit	NCP	Hajare Pandurang Jairamji
23	Nagpur	BJP	Vinod Gudadhe Patil	INC	Vilas Muttemwar	Ind.	Prof. Ashok Godghate
24	Bhandara	BJP	Chunnilal Thakur	INC	Shrikant Jichkar	NCP	Nimbarate Jagdish Kanhaji
25	Chimur	BJP	Namdeo Harbaji Diwathe	RPI	Jogendra Kawade	NCP	Praful Patel
26	Chandrapur	BJP	Hansraj Gangaram Ahir	INC	Nareshkumar Chunnalal Puglia	NCP	Potdukhe Shobha Sudhakar
27	Wardha	BJP	Suresh Ganapat Wagmare	INC	Prabha Rao	NCP	Datta Meghe
28	Yavatmal	BJP	Harising Nasaru Rathod	INC	Uttamrao Deorao Patil	NCP	Rajabhau Ganeshrao Thakre
29	Hingoli	SS	Mane Shivaji Gyanbarao	BBM	Adv. Pole Naik Madhavrao Bahenarao	NCP	Suryakanta Patil
30	Nanded	BJP	Dr. Dhanajirao Vyankatrao Deshmukh	INC	Bhaskarrao Bapurao Khatgaonkar Patil	PWPI	Amarjitsingh Major Panjabsingh Gill
31	Parbhani	SS	Suresh Jadhav	INC	Jamkar Raosaheb Bapusaheb	NCP	Warpudkar Suresh Ambadasrao
32	Jalna	BJP	Raosaheb Danve	INC	Bangar Dnyandeo Ganpatrao	NCP	Borade Vijayanna Sampatrao
33	Aurangabad	SS	Chandrakant Khaire	INC	A. R. Antulay	NCP	Baburao Pawar
34	Beed	BJP	Jaisingrao Gaikwad Patil	INC	Ashok Patil	NCP	Radhakrishna Sahebrao Patil
35	Latur	BJP	Gopalrao Patil	INC	Shivraj Patil	NCP	Pasha Patel
36	Osmanabad (SC)	SS	Shivaji Kamble	INC	Arvind Kamble	NCP	Deokule Kanifnath
37	Sholapur	BJP	Valyal Lingraj Balirayya	INC	Sushilkumar Shinde	NCP	Abdulpurkar Aralappa Gangappa
38	Pandharpur (SC)	BJP	Kshirsagar Nagnath Dattatray	INC	Thorat Sandipan Bhagwan	Ind.	Ramdas Athawale
39	Ahmednagar	BJP	Dilipkumar Gandhi	INC	Bhos Babasaheb Sahadu	NCP	Maruti Deoram alias Dada Patil Shelke
40	Kopargaon	SS	Balasaheb Vikhe Patil	INC	Govindrao Adik	NCP	Solicitor Gulabrao Sakharam Shelke
41	Khed	SS	Bankhele Kisanrao Baburao	INC	Kandage Ram Janardan	NCP	Ashok Namdeorao Mohol
42	Pune	BJP	Pradeep Rawat	INC	Joshi Mohan	NCP	Tupe Vithal Baburao
43	Baramati	BJP	Dr. Pratibha Lokhande	INC	Ramkrishna More	NCP	Sharad Pawar
44	Satara	SS	Hindurao Naik Nimbalkar	INC	Khardekar Nimbalkar Yashwantrao Appasaheb	NCP	Laxmanrao Pandurang Patil
45	Karad	SS	Manukumare Vasant Dnyandev	INC	Prithviraj Chavan	NCP	Shriniwas Patil
46	Sangli	BJP	Dange Rajendra alias Chiman Ramchandra	INC	Prakashbapu Vasantdada Patil	NCP	Madan Patil
47	Ichalkaranji	SS	Bhau alias Pundlik Krishna Jadhav	INC	Kallappa Awade	NCP	Nivedita Sambhajirao Mane
48	Kolhapur	SS	Major General Shivajirao Shripati Patil	INC	Udaysingrao Gaikwad	NCP	Sadashivrao Dadoba Mandlik

== Results ==
15	13	10	6	1	1	1	1
SHS	BJP	INC	NCP	BBM	JD(S)	PWPI	IND

=== Results by Party/Alliance ===
Alliance/ Party		Popular vote			Seats		
Alliance/ Party		Votes	%	±pp	Contested	Won	+/−
NDA	SHS	55,67,484	16.86	▼2.80	22	15	▲9
NDA	BJP	69,95,634	21.18	▼1.31	26	13	▲9
NDA	Total	1,25,63,118	38.04	▼5.20	48	28	▲18
INC+	INC	98,12,144	29.71	▼13.93	42	10	▼23
INC+	BBM	6,92,559	2.10	Steady	4	1	Steady
INC+	RPI	4,76,825	1.44	▼2.70	2	0	Steady
INC+	Total	1,09,81,528	33.25	▼17.15	48	11	▼23
NCP+	NCP	71,26,760	21.58	▲21.58	38	6	▲6
NCP+	IND	5,10,748	1.55	▲1.55	4	1	▲1
NCP+	JD(S)	3,00,316	0.91	▲0.91	2	1	▲1
NCP+	PWPI	2,82,583	0.86	Steady	2	1	▲1
NCP+	SP	1,16,415	0.35	▼2.27	2	0	Steady
NCP+	Total	83,36,822	25.25	Steady	48	9	▲9
Others		5,79,501	1.74	Steady	43	0	Steady
IND		5,70,633	1.72	▲0.38	74	0	Steady
Total		3,30,31,602	100%	-	261	48	-

=== List of elected MPs ===
Constituency		Winner				1st Runner-Up				2nd Runner-Up				Margin
#	Name	Candidate	Party	Votes	%	Candidate	Party	Votes	%	Candidate	Party	Votes	%	Margin
1	Rajapur	Suresh Prabhu	SS	221,523	51.07	Madhu Dandavate	JDS	108,673	25.05	Sudhir Sawant	INC	103,556	23.87	112,850
2	Ratnagiri	Anant Geete	SS	293,834	54.99	Sujit Ziman	NCP	178,491	33.40	Rajaram Shinde	INC	62,028	11.61	115,343
3	Kolaba	Ramsheth Thakur	PWP	274,361	41.55	D B Patil	SS	231,264	35.03	Pushpa Sable	INC	148,146	22.44	43,097
4	Mumbai South	Jayawantiben Mehta	BJP	144,945	47.84	Murli Deora	INC	134,702	44.46	Aziz Lalani	SP	19,128	6.31	10,243
5	Mumbai South Central	Mohan Rawale	SS	176,323	47.97	Majeed Memon	SP	97,287	26.47	Dada Samant	BBM	77,747	21.15	79,036
6	Mumbai North Central	Manohar Joshi	SS	294,935	55.83	Raja Dhale	BBM	125,940	23.84	B. C. Kamble	IND	56,684	10.73	168,995
7	Mumbai North East	Kirit Somaiya	BJP	400,436	43.08	Gurudas Kamat	INC	393,160	42.30	Ram Manohar Tripathi	NCP	102513	11.03	7,276
8	Mumbai North West	Sunil Dutt	INC	366,669	52.35	Madhukar Sarpotdar	SS	281,130	40.14	Ramesh Dube	NCP	41,947	5.99	85,539
9	Mumbai North	Ram Naik	BJP	517,941	56.39	Chandrakant Gosalia	INC	363,805	39.61	Damodar Tandel	IND	25,132	2.74	154,136
10	Thane	Prakash Paranjape	SS	391,446	43.22	Nakul Patil	INC	291,763	32.21	Prabhakar Hegde	NCP	177,256	19.57	99,683
11	Dahanu (ST)	Chintaman Vanaga	BJP	240,866	36.50	Damodar Shingada	INC	178,596	27.06	Shankar Nam	NCP	144,589	21.91	62,270
12	Nashik	Uttamrao Dhikale	SS	303,084	41.59	Madhavrao Patil	NCP	266,272	36.54	Gopalrao Gulave	INC	148,346	20.36	36,812
13	Malegaon (ST)	Haribahu Mahale	JDS	191,643	29.32	Babanrao Gangurde	BJP	187,251	28.65	Zamru Khandole	INC	179,941	27.53	4,392
14	Dhule (ST)	Ramdas Gavit	BJP	211,904	36.14	Bapu Hari Chaure	INC	198,919	33.93	D. S. Ahire	NCP	167,834	28.63	12,985
15	Nandurbar (ST)	Manikrao Gavit	INC	318,338	47.44	Govind Vasave	NCP	187,567	27.95	Kuwarsing Valvi	BJP	151,509	22.58	1,30,771
16	Erandol	Annasaheb M. K. Patil	BJP	297,867	47.36	Vasantrao More	NCP	193,411	30.75	V. G. Patil	INC	132,902	21.13	1,04,456
17	Jalgaon	Y. G. Mahajan	BJP	334,020	47.62	Ulhas Patil	INC	244,225	34.82	Jivram Mahajan	NCP	120,951	17.24	89,795
18	Buldhana (SC)	Anandrao Adsul	SS	294,922	41.82	Mukul Wasnik	INC	249,915	35.44	Sahebrao Sardar	NCP	133,165	18.88	45,007
19	Akola	Prakash Ambedkar	BBM	272,243	40.53	Pandurang Fundkar	BJP	263,527	39.24	Santoshkumar Korpe	NCP	123,640	18.41	8,716
20	Washim	Pundlikrao Gawali	SS	244,820	38.29	Anantrao Deshmukh	INC	205,225	32.1	Javed Khan	NCP	154,030	24.09	39,595

No.	Constituency	Winning candidate	Party affiliation	Margin
1.	Ahmednagar	Dilipkumar Mansukhlal Gandhi	Bharatiya Janata Party	28,457
3.	Amravati	Gudhe Anant Mahadeoappa	Shivsena	73,652
4.	Aurangabad	Chandrakant Khaire	Shivsena	55,889
5.	Baramati	Sharad Pawar	Nationalist Congress Party	2,98,903
6.	Beed	Jaisinghrao Gaikwad Patil	Bharatiya Janata Party	51,190
7.	Bhandara	Chunnilalbhau Thakur	Bharatiya Janata Party	3,819
9.	Chandrapur	Puglia Nareshkumar Chunnalal	Indian National Congress	2,837
10.	Chimur	Diwathe Namdeo Harbaji	Bharatiya Janata Party	70,040
14.	Hingoli	Shivaji Gyanbarao Mane	Shivsena	80,655
15.	Ichalkaranji	Nivedita Sambhajirao Mane	Nationalist Congress Party	12,812
17.	Jalna	Raosaheb Danve	Bharatiya Janata Party	1,23,909
18.	Karad	Shriniwas Dadasaheb Patil	Nationalist Congress Party	1,22,961
19.	Khed	Ashok Namdeorao Mohol	Nationalist Congress Party	57,018
21.	Kolhapur	Mandlik Sadashivrao Dadoba	Nationalist Congress Party	1,08,910
22.	Kopargaon	EV Alias Balasaheb Vikhe Patil	Shivsena	47,415
23.	Latur	Patil Shivraj Vishwanath	Indian National Congress	40,290
31.	Nagpur	Vilas Muttemwar	Indian National Congress	72,695
32.	Nanded	Patil Bhaskarrao Bapurao Khatgaonkar	Indian National Congress	32,575
35.	Osmanabad (SC)	Kamble Shivaji Vithalrao	Shivsena	59,073
36.	Pandharpur (SC)	Athawale Ramdas Bandu	Independent	2,59,505
37.	Parbhani	Jadhav Suresh Ramrao	Shivsena	43,665
38.	Pune	Pradeep Rawat	Bharatiya Janata Party	91,285
40.	Ramtek	Subodh Mohite	Shivsena	11,689
42.	Sangli	Prakashbapu Vasantdada Patil	Indian National Congress	1,60,560
43.	Satara	Laxmanrao Pandurang Jadhav Patil	Nationalist Congress Party	1,24,771
44.	Solapur	Sushilkumar Shinde	Indian National Congress	76,995
46.	Wardha	Prabha Rau	Indian National Congress	7,062
48.	Yavatmal	Uttamrao Deorao Patil	Indian National Congress	15,226

== Results by region ==
Region	Total seats	Shiv Sena	Bharatiya Janata Party	Indian National Congress	Nationalist Congress Party	Others
Western Maharashtra	11	01	02	02	05	01
Vidarbha	10	04	02	04	00	00
Marathwada	8	03	01	02	00	00
Thane+Konkan	4	03	00	00	01	00
Mumbai	6	02	03	01	00	00
North Maharashtra	11	02	05	01	00	03
Total	48	15	13	10	06	04

== Post-election Union Council of Ministers from Maharashtra ==
#	Name	Constituency	Designation	Department	From	To	Party
1	Pramod Mahajan	Rajya Sabha (Maharashtra)	Cabinet Minister	Water Resources	13 Oct 1999	22 Nov 1999	BJP
1	Pramod Mahajan	Rajya Sabha (Maharashtra)	Cabinet Minister	Parliamentary Affairs	13 Oct 1999	29 Jan 2003	BJP
1	Pramod Mahajan	Rajya Sabha (Maharashtra)	Cabinet Minister	Communications	22 Nov 1999	22 Dec 2001	BJP
1	Pramod Mahajan	Rajya Sabha (Maharashtra)	Cabinet Minister	Information Technology	22 Nov 1999	22 Dec 2001	BJP
1	Pramod Mahajan	Rajya Sabha (Maharashtra)	Cabinet Minister	Communications and Information Technology	22 Dec 2001	29 Jan 2003	BJP
2	Suresh Prabhu	Rajapur	Cabinet Minister	Chemicals and Fertilizers	13 Oct 1999	30 Sept 2000	SS
2	Suresh Prabhu	Rajapur	Cabinet Minister	Power	30 Sept 2000	24 Aug 2002	SS
2	Suresh Prabhu	Rajapur	Cabinet Minister	Heavy Industries and Public Enterprises	9 May 2002	1 July 2002	SS
3	Ram Naik	Mumbai North	Cabinet Minister	Petroleum and Natural Gas	13 Oct 1999	22 May 2004	BJP
4	Manohar Joshi	Mumbai North Central	Cabinet Minister	Heavy Industries and Public Enterprises	13 Oct 1999	9 May 2002	SS
5	Ram Jethmalani	Rajya Sabha (Maharashtra)	Cabinet Minister	Law, Justice and Company Affairs	13 Oct 1999	23 July 2000	BJP
6	Balasaheb Vikhe Patil	Kopargaon	MoS	Finance	13 Oct 1999	1 July 2002	SS
6	Balasaheb Vikhe Patil	Kopargaon	Cabinet Minister	Heavy Industries and Public Enterprises	1 July 2002	24 May 2003	SS
7	Ved Prakash Goyal	Rajya Sabha (Maharashtra)	Cabinet Minister	Shipping	1 Sept 2001	29 Jan 2003	BJP
8	Anant Geete	Ratnagiri	MoS	Finance and Company Affairs	1 July 2002	26 Aug 2002	SS
8	Anant Geete	Ratnagiri	Cabinet Minister	Power	26 Aug 2002	22 May 2004	SS
9	Subodh Mohite	Ramtek	Cabinet Minister	Heavy Industries and Public Enterprises	24 May 2003	22 May 2004	SS
10	Jaisingrao Gaikwad Patil	Beed	MoS	Human Resource Development	13 Oct 1999	27 May 2000	BJP
10	Jaisingrao Gaikwad Patil	Beed	MoS	Mines	27 May 2000	1 Sept 2001	BJP
11	Jayawantiben Mehta	Mumbai South	MoS	Power	13 Oct 1999	22 May 2004	BJP
12	Annasaheb M. K. Patil	Erandol	MoS	Rural Development	1 Sept 2001	22 May 2004	BJP
13	Anandrao Vithoba Adsul	Buldhana (SC)	MoS	Finance and Company Affairs	26 Aug 2002	22 May 2004	SS
14	Dilipkumar Gandhi	Ahmednagar	MoS	Shipping	29 Jan 2003	15 Mar 2004	BJP

== Assembly segments wise lead of Parties ==
Party	Assembly segments	Position in Assembly (as of 1999 election)
Shiv Sena	76	69
Bharatiya Janata Party	74	56
Indian National Congress	70	75
Nationalist Congress Party	47	58
Bharipa Bahujan Mahasangh	5	3
Peasants and Workers Party of India	5	5
Samajwadi Party	2	2
Communist Party of India (Marxist)	2	2
Janata Dal (Secular)	1	2
Others	6	16
Total	288	
