= 1996 Indian general election in Maharashtra =

1996 Indian General Election in Maharashtra
- 27 April, 2 May, and 7 May 1996
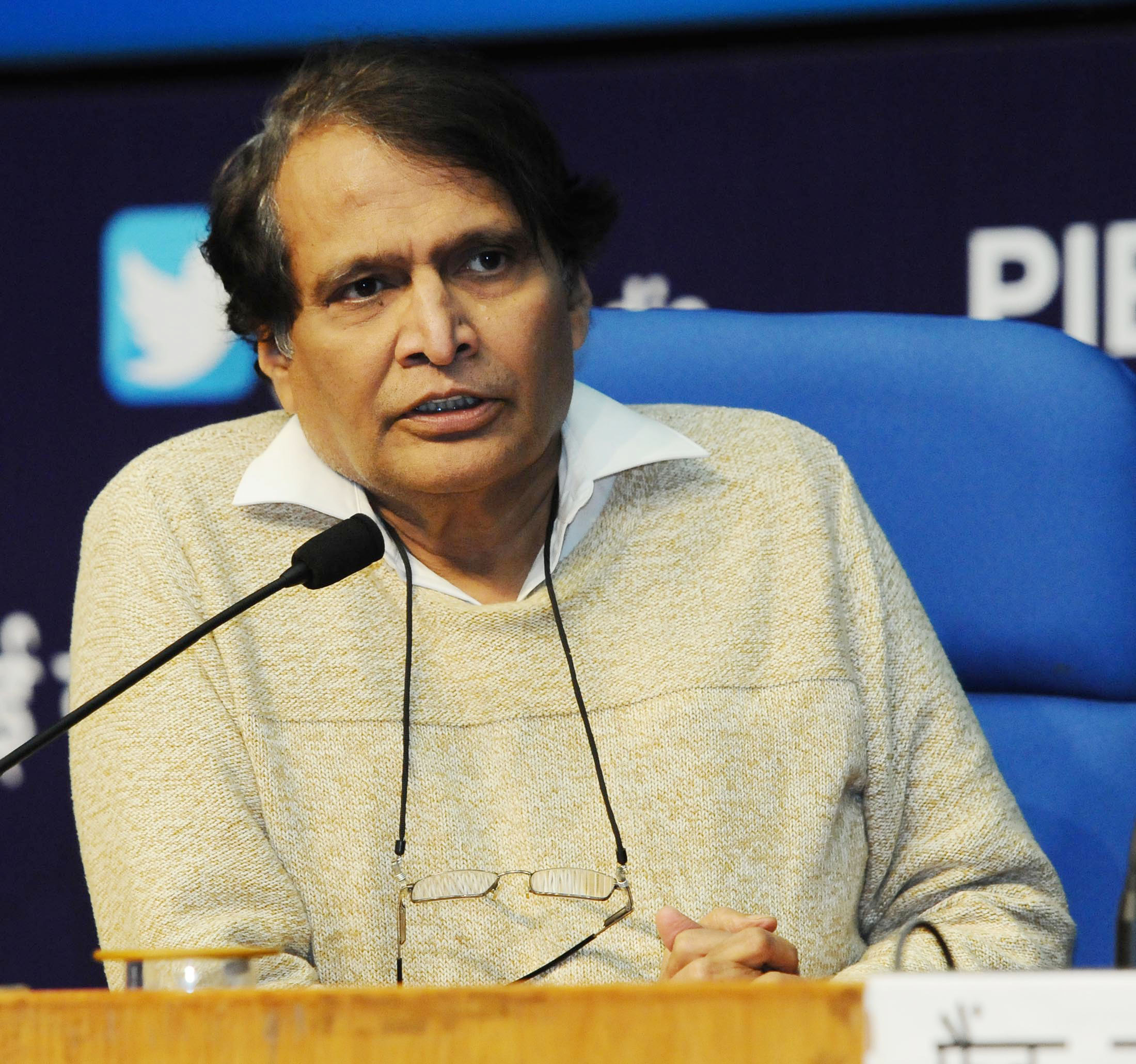

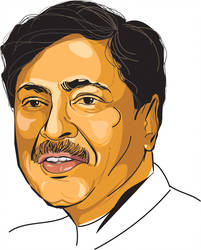

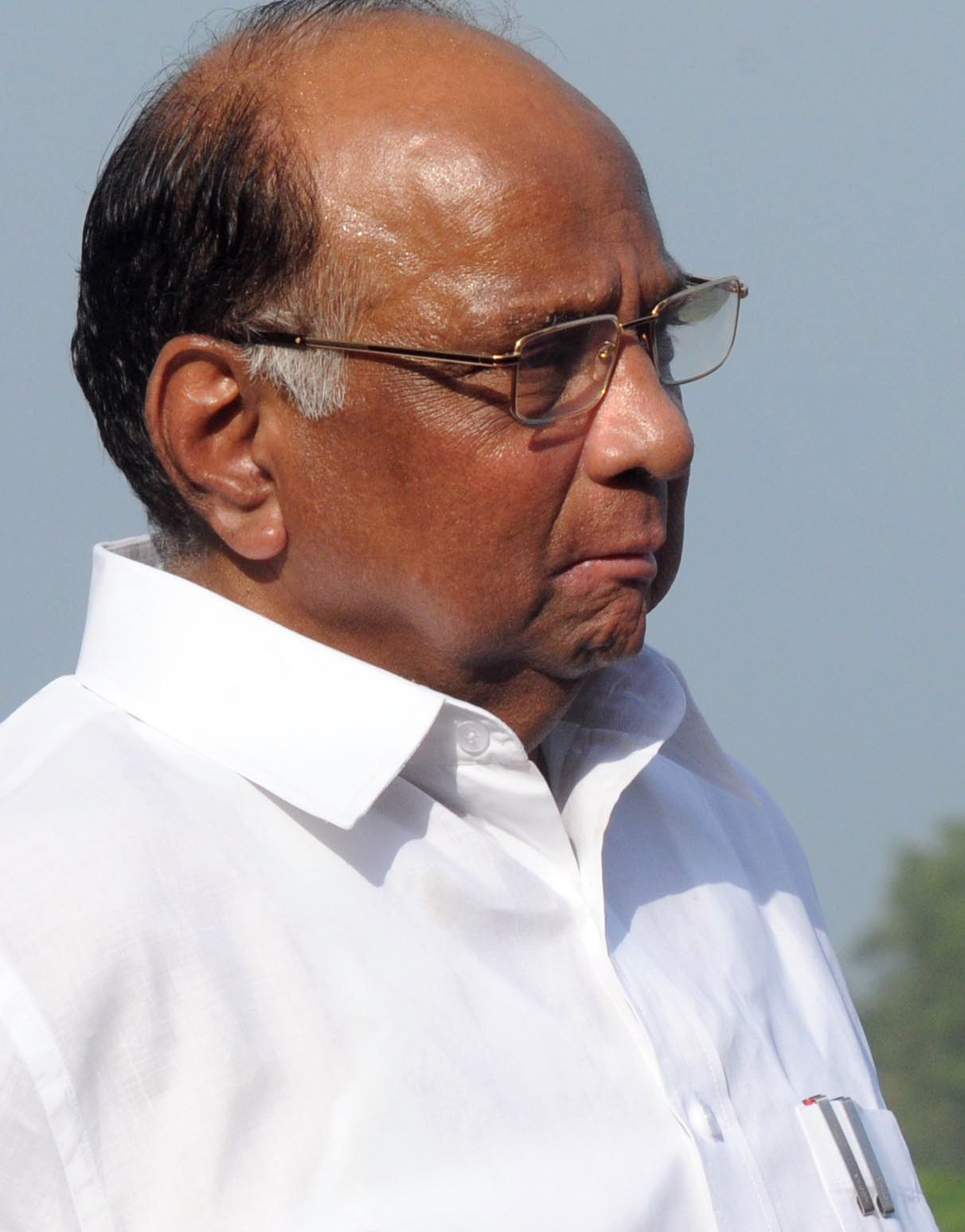
	Majority party	Minority party	Third party
Leader	Suresh Prabhu	Pramod Mahajan	Sharad Pawar
Party	SS	BJP	INC
Leader's seat	Rajapur	Mumbai North East	Baramati
Seats before	5	5	37
Seats won	15	18	15
Seat change	▲10	▲13	▼22
- Maharashtra
Prime Minister before election
Narasimha Rao
INC
Prime Minister after election
A. B. Vajpayee
BJP

1996 Indian general election was held in Maharashtra on 27 April, 2 May, and 7 May 1996. Maharashtra returns 48 MPs to the Lok Sabha.

The National Democratic Alliance consisting of BJP and Shiv Sena won 33 seats, while the Congress won 15 seats.

== Parties and alliances ==
=== Yuti Alliance ===
Party	Flag	Symbol	Leader(s)	Seats contested
Bharatiya Janata Party			Pramod Mahajan	25
Shiv Sena			Suresh Prabhu	20
Independents			Shankarrao Bajirao Patil	1
Independents			Bhosale Jaywantrao Krishna	1
Independents			Matuti Dnyanu Patil	1
Total				48

=== Congress Alliance ===
Party	Flag	Symbol	Leader	Seats contested
Indian National Congress			Sharad Pawar	48
Total				48

== List of Candidates ==
Constituency		NDA		INC	
#	Name	Party	Candidate	Party	Candidate
1	Rajapur	SS	Suresh Prabhu	INC	Sudhir Sawant
2	Ratnagiri	SS	Anant Geete	INC	Govindrao Nikam
3	Kolaba	SS	Anant Tare	INC	A. R. Antulay
4	Mumbai South	BJP	Jayawantiben Mehta	INC	Murli Deora
5	Mumbai South Central	SS	Mohan Rawale	INC	Ishaq Jamkhanawala
6	Mumbai North Central	SS	Narayan Athawale	INC	Sharad Dighe
7	Mumbai North East	BJP	Pramod Mahajan	INC	Gurudas Kamat
8	Mumbai North West	SS	Madhukar Sarpotdar	INC	Nirmala Prabhavalkar
9	Mumbai North	BJP	Ram Naik	INC	Anoopchand Shah
10	Thane	SS	Prakash Paranjape	INC	Haribansh Singh Ramakbal
11	Dahanu (ST)	BJP	Chintaman Vanaga	INC	Damodar Shingada
12	Nashik	SS	Rajaram Godase	INC	Vasant Pawar
13	Malegaon (ST)	BJP	Kacharu Bhau Raut	INC	Zamru Kahandole
14	Dhule (ST)	BJP	Sahebrao Bagul	INC	Bapu Hari Chaure
15	Nandurbar (ST)	BJP	Valvi Kuwarsing Fulji	INC	Manikrao Gavit
16	Erandol	BJP	Annasaheb M. K. Patil	INC	Kishor Appa Patil
17	Jalgaon	BJP	Gunwantrao Sarode	INC	Jivram Tukaram
18	Buldhana (SC)	SS	Anandrao Adsul	INC	Mukul Wasnik
19	Akola	BJP	Pandurang Fundkar	INC	Korpe Santoshkumar
20	Washim	SS	Pundlikrao Gawali	INC	Sudhakar Naik
21	Amravati	SS	Anant Gudhe	INC	Uttam Mohanaji
22	Ramtek	SS	Jadhao P. Bhagwant	INC	Datta Meghe
23	Nagpur	BJP	Banwarilal Purohit	INC	Kunda Vijaykar
24	Bhandara	BJP	Aswale Ram Gopal	INC	Praful Patel
25	Chimur	BJP	Namdeo Diwathe	INC	Vilas Muttemwar
26	Chandrapur	BJP	Hansraj Ahir	INC	Shantaram Potdukhe
27	Wardha	BJP	Vijay Mude	INC	Vasant Sathe
28	Yavatmal	BJP	Rajabhau Thakre	INC	Ghulam Nabi Azad
29	Hingoli	SS	Shivaji Mane	INC	Vilasrao Gundewar
30	Nanded	BJP	Venkat Rao Deshmukh	INC	Gangadharrao Deshmukh
31	Parbhani	SS	Suresh Jadhav	INC	Ashokrao Deshmukh
32	Jalna	BJP	Uttamsingh Pawar	INC	Rajesh Tope
33	Aurangabad	SS	Pradeep Jaiswal	INC	Suresh Patil
34	Beed	BJP	Rajani Ashokrao Patil	INC	Kesharbai Kshirsagar
35	Latur	BJP	Gopalrao Patil	INC	Shivraj Patil
36	Osmanabad (SC)	SS	Shivaji Kamble	INC	Arvind Kamble
37	Sholapur	BJP	Lingaraj Valyal	INC	Dharmanna Mondayya Sadul
38	Pandharpur (SC)	BJP	Kamble Sukhdeo	INC	Sandipan Thorat
39	Ahmednagar	SS	Damaniya Parvez Cawas	INC	Maruti Shelke Deoram
40	Kopargaon	BJP	Bhimrao Badade	INC	Shankarrao Kale
41	Khed	SS	Kisanrao Bankhele	INC	Nivrutti Sherkar
42	Pune	BJP	Girish Bapat	INC	Suresh Kalmadi
43	Baramati	IND	Shankarrao Patil	INC	Sharad Pawar
44	Satara	SS	Hindurao Nimbalkar	INC	Prataprao Bhosale
45	Karad	IND	Jaywantrao Bhosale	INC	Prithviraj Chavan
46	Sangli	IND	Matuti Mane	INC	Madan Patil
47	Ichalkaranji	BJP	Sarnobat Ganpatrao	INC	Kallappa Awade
48	Kolhapur	SS	Ramesh Deo	INC	Udaysingrao Gaikwad

== Results ==
=== Results by Party/Alliance ===
Alliance/ Party		Popular vote			Seats		
Alliance/ Party		Votes	%	±pp	Contested	Won	+/−
Yuti	BJP	61,84,428	21.18	▲0.98	25	18	▲13
Yuti	SHS	47,72,419	16.83	▲7.38	20	15	▲11
Yuti	IND	5,50,942	1.94	▲1.94	3	0	Steady
Yuti	Total	1,15,07,789	39.95	▲10.30	48	33	▲24
INC		98,64,853	34.78	▼13.62	48	15	▼22
RPI		13,94,549	4.92	Steady	11	0	Steady
JD		9,36,857	3.30	▼7.24	12	0	Steady
SP		5,83,410	2.06	Steady	7	0	Steady
PWPI		4,37,805	1.54	Steady	4	0	Steady
BBM		3,29,695	1.16	Steady	4	0	Steady
CPI(M)		3,11,070	1.10	Steady	3	0	Steady
Others		8,07,819	3.48	Steady	125	0	Steady
IND		21,87,389	7.71	▲3.53	803	0	Steady
Total		2,83,61,236	100%	-	1065	48	-

== Constituency-wise results ==
Constituency		Winner				Runner Up				Margin	%
#	Name	Candidate	Party	Votes	%	Candidate	Party	Votes	%	Margin	%
1	Rajapur	Suresh Prabhu	SHS	193,566	44.80	Sudhir Sawant	INC	127,430	29.49	66,136	15.31
2	Ratnagiri	Anant Geete	SHS	275,114	58.54	Govindrao Nikam	INC	143,330	30.50	131,784	28.04
3	Kolaba	A. R. Antulay	INC	213,187	34.10	Tare Anant Waman	SHS	209,180	33.46	4,007	0.64
4	Mumbai South	Jayawantiben Mehta	BJP	138,831	44.68	Murli Deora	INC	115,623	37.21	23,208	7.47
5	Mumbai South Central	Mohan Rawale	SHS	173,900	47.40	Dutta Samant	SP	115,248	31.41	58,652	15.99
6	Mumbai North Central	Narayan Athawale	SHS	242,536	47.92	Sharad Dighe	INC	153,337	30.30	89,199	17.62
7	Mumbai North East	Pramod Mahajan	BJP	428,825	46.87	Gurudas Kamat	INC	237,262	25.93	191,563	20.94
8	Mumbai North West	Madhukar Sirpotdar	SHS	321,107	45.40	Nirmala Prabhavalkar	INC	232,638	32.89	88,469	12.51
9	Mumbai North	Ram Naik	BJP	502,738	58.49	Anoopchand Shah	INC	246,478	28.68	256,260	29.81
10	Thane	Prakash Vishvanath Paranjape	SHS	466,773	51.70	Haribansh Ramakbal	INC	274,136	30.37	192,637	21.33
11	Dahanu (ST)	Chintaman Vanaga	BJP	226,388	42.02	Damodar Shingada	INC	153,870	28.56	72,518	13.46
12	Nashik	Godase Rajaram Parashram	SHS	295,044	47.41	Vasant Pawar	INC	221,505	35.59	73,539	11.82
13	Malegaon (ST)	Raut Kacharu Bhau	BJP	149,307	34.59	Haribhau Shankar	JD	136,426	31.60	12,881	2.99
14	Dhule (ST)	Bagul Sahebrao Sukram	BJP	184,563	48.60	Choure Bapu Hari	INC	154,930	40.80	29,633	7.80
15	Nandurbar (ST)	Gavit Manikrao Hodlya	INC	236,608	46.92	Valvi Kuwarsing Fulji	BJP	203,299	40.32	33,309	6.60
16	Erandol	Annasaheb M. K. Patil	BJP	247,595	48.38	Kishor Appa Patil	INC	201,068	39.29	46,527	9.09
17	Jalgaon	Gunwantrao Rambhau Sarode	BJP	268,654	52.99	Mahajan Jivram Tukaram	INC	184,567	36.40	84,087	16.59
18	Buldhana (SC)	Anandrao Vithoba Adsul	SHS	281,953	47.50	Mukul Wasnik	INC	212,522	35.81	69,431	11.69
19	Akola	Pandurang Fundkar	BJP	221,094	34.61	Prakash Ambedkar	RPI	212,041	33.19	9,053	1.42
20	Washim	Gawali Pundlikrao Ramji	SHS	228,238	39.30	Naik Sudhakar Rajusingh	INC	211,549	36.42	16,689	2.88
21	Amravati	Anantrao Mahadeoappa	SHS	215,672	39.86	R. S. Gavai	RPI	157,041	29.02	58,631	10.84
22	Ramtek	Datta Meghe	INC	207,188	37.79	Prakash Jadhav	SHS	181,466	33.09	25,722	4.70
23	Nagpur	Banwarilal Purohit	BJP	353,547	45.45	Kunda Avinash Vijaykar	INC	232,045	29.83	121,502	15.62
24	Bhandara	Praful Patel	INC	259,630	42.84	Aswale Ram Gopal	BJP	252,667	41.69	6,963	1.15
25	Chimur	Diwate Namdeo Harbaji	BJP	309,045	43.78	Muttemwar Vilas Baburao	INC	196,710	27.87	112,335	15.91
26	Chandrapur	Hansraj Gangaram Ahir	BJP	253,679	34.08	Shantaram Potdukhe	INC	157,548	21.17	96,131	12.91
27	Wardha	Vijay Mude	BJP	190,803	35.30	Vasant Sathe	INC	168,828	31.23	21,975	4.07
28	Yavatmal	Rajabhau Thakre	BJP	267,519	46.24	Ghulam Nabi Azad	INC	228,957	39.57	38,562	6.67
29	Hingoli	Shivaji Mane	SHS	203,785	35.36	Madhavrao Bahenarao	BBM	124,718	21.64	79,067	13.72
30	Nanded	Kunturkar Deshmukh	INC	185,302	29.41	Dhanajirao Deshmukh	BJP	173,366	27.52	11,936	1.89
31	Parbhani	Jadhav Suresh Ramrao	SHS	230,762	47.91	Ashokrao Deshmukh	INC	115,887	24.06	114,875	23.85
32	Jalna	Pawar Uttamsing Rajdharsing	BJP	319,916	53.01	Tope Rajesh Ankushrao	INC	201,286	33.35	118,630	19.66
33	Aurangabad	Jaiswal Pradeep	SHS	301,163	44.44	Suresh Patil	INC	186,584	27.53	114,579	16.91
34	Beed	Rajani Ashokrao Patil	BJP	279,995	43.41	Kshirsagar Kesharbai	INC	222,535	34.50	57,460	8.91
35	Latur	Shivraj Patil	INC	279,775	41.77	Patil Gopalrao Vithalrao	BJP	200,403	29.92	79,372	11.85
36	Osmanabad (SC)	Kamble Shivaji Vithalrao	SHS	198,521	42.06	Arvind Tulshiram Kamble	INC	182,602	38.69	15,919	3.37
37	Sholapur	Lingaraj Valyal	BJP	184,075	33.79	Patil Ravikant Shankarappa	JD	166,988	30.66	17,087	3.13
38	Pandharpur (SC)	Sandipan Thorat	INC	230,214	45.45	Kamble Changdeo Sukhdeo	BJP	155,126	30.63	75,088	14.82
39	Ahmednagar	Maruti Deoram	INC	212,751	38.40	Damaniya Parvez Cawas	SHS	163,342	29.48	49,409	8.92
40	Kopargaon	Bhimrao Badade	BJP	243,543	47.81	Kale Shankarrao Devram	INC	223,292	43.83	20,251	3.98
41	Khed	Nivrutti Sherkar	INC	249,926	44.40	Bankhele Kisanrao	SHS	231,357	41.10	18,569	3.30
42	Pune	Suresh Kalmadi	INC	390,778	50.66	Girish Bapat	BJP	303,783	39.38	86,995	11.28
43	Baramati	Sharad Pawar	INC	427,589	57.23	Shankarrao Bajirao Patil	IND	267,088	35.75	160,501	21.48
44	Satara	Naik Nimbalkar	SHS	190,526	35.66	Prataprao Baburao Bhosale	INC	178,717	33.45	11,809	2.21
45	Karad	Prithviraj Chavan	INC	307,840	49.96	Bhosale Jaywantrao Krishna	IND	158,244	25.68	149,596	24.28
46	Sangli	Madan Patil	INC	300,323	51.50	Matuti Dnyanu Patil (Mane)	IND	125,610	21.54	174,713	29.96
47	Ichalkaranji	Kallappa Awade	INC	237,510	34.44	Nivedita Sambhajirao Mane	IND	209,000	30.30	28,510	4.14
48	Kolhapur	Udaysingrao Gaikwad	INC	236,739	43.93	Ramesh Deo	SHS	168,414	31.25	68,325	12.68
