= 2004 Indian general election in Maharashtra =

Indian general election in Maharashtra, 2004
- April-May 2004

48 seats
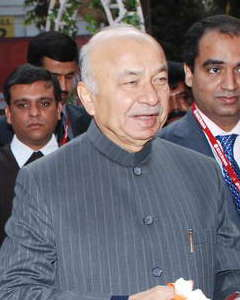

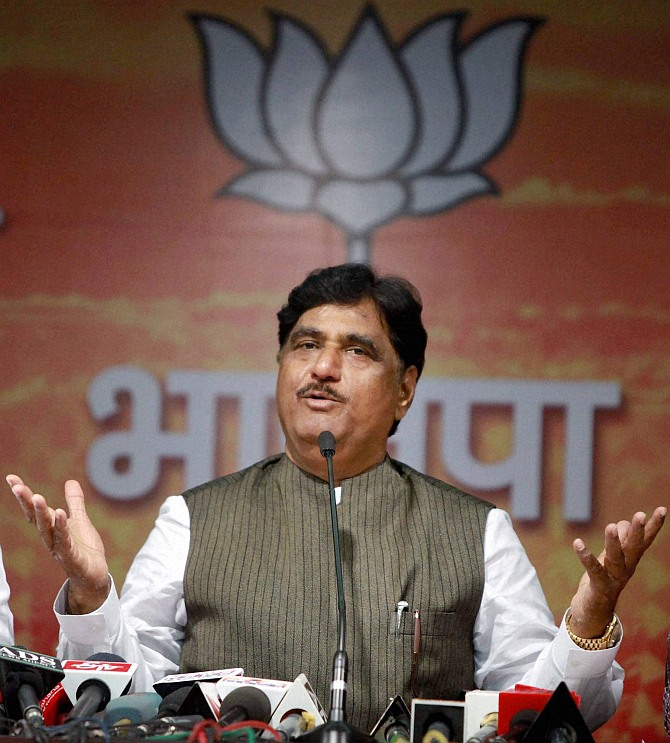

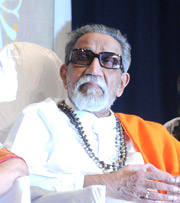

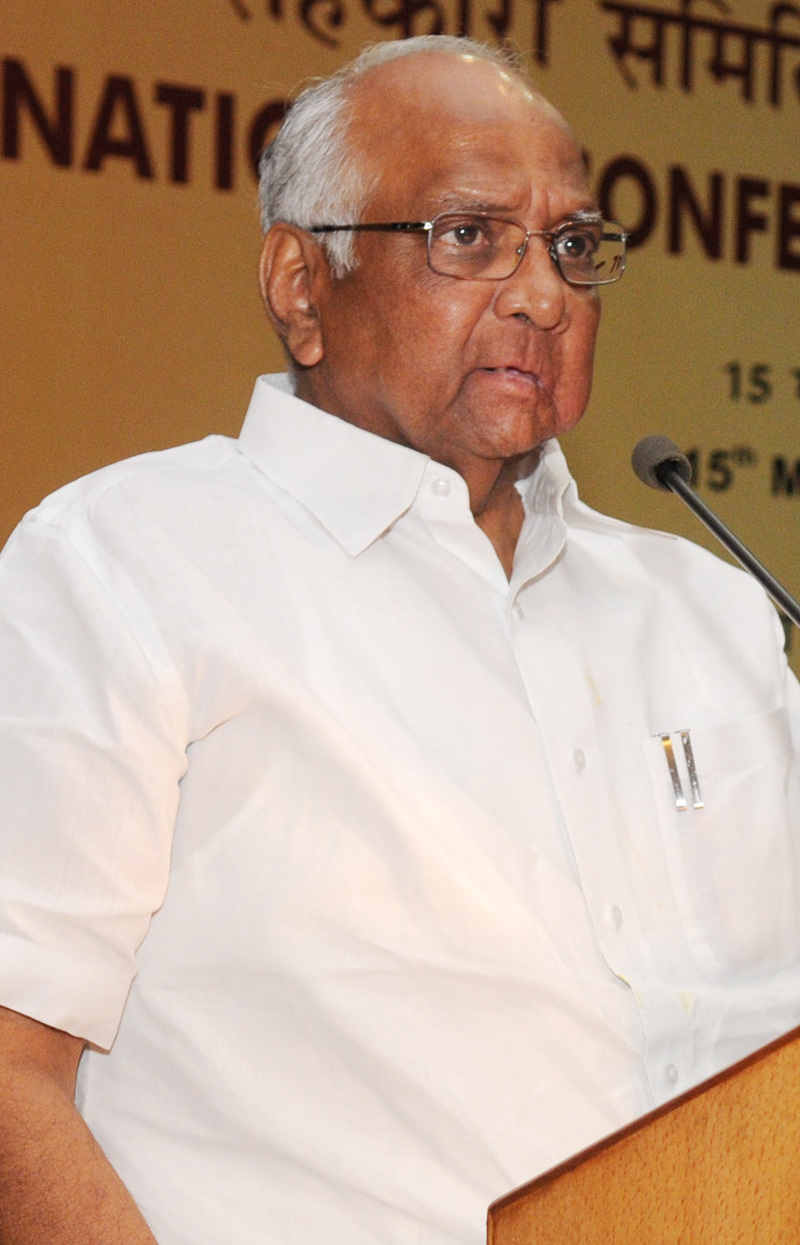
	First party	Second party
Leader	Sushilkumar Shinde	Gopinath Munde
Party	INC	BJP
Alliance	INC+ (post poll UPA)	NDA
Last election	10	13
Seats won	13	13
Seat change	▲3	Steady
	Third party	Fourth party
Leader	Bal Thackeray	Sharad Pawar
Party	SS	NCP
Alliance	NDA	INC+ (post poll UPA)
Last election	15	6
Seats won	12	9
Seat change	▼3	▲3
- Maharashtra

- Alliance wise Structure
Prime Minister before election
Atal Bihari Vajpayee
BJP
Prime Minister after election
Manmohan Singh
INC

The Indian general election, 2004 in Maharashtra was held for 48 seats with the state going to polls in the first three phases of the general elections. The major contenders in the state were the United Progressive Alliance (UPA) and National Democratic Alliance (NDA). UPA consisted of the Indian National Congress and the Nationalist Congress Party whereas the NDA consisted of the Bharatiya Janata Party and the Shiv Sena.

== Schedule ==
The schedule of the election was announced by the Election Commission of India on 29 February 2004.

Poll event	Phase	
Poll event	1	2
Date of announcement	29 February 2004	
Notification date	24 March 2004	31 March 2004
Last date for filing nomination	31 March 2004	7 April 2004
Scrutiny of nomination	2 April 2004	8 April 2004
Last date for withdrawal of nomination	5 April 2004	10 April 2004
Date of poll	20 April 2004	26 April 2004
Date of counting of votes	13 May 2004	
No. of constituencies	24	24

== Parties and alliances ==
=== National Democratic Alliance ===
Party	Flag	Symbol	Leader	Seats contested
Bharatiya Janata Party			Gopinath Munde	26
Shiv Sena			Bal Thackeray	22
Total				48

=== United Progressive Alliance ===
United Progressive Alliance
Party	Flag	Symbol	Leader	Seats
Indian National Congress			Sushilkumar Shinde	26
Nationalist Congress Party			Sharad Pawar	18
Republican Party of India (Athawale)			Ramdas Athawale	1
Republican Party of India			R. S. Gavai	1
Janata Dal (Secular)			H. D. Deve Gowda	1
Peoples Republican Party			Jogendra Kawade	1
Total				48

== List of Candidates ==
Constituency		NDA		UPA	
#	Name	Party	Candidate	Party	Candidate
1	Rajapur	SS	Suresh Prabhu	INC	Sudhir Sawant
2	Ratnagiri	SS	Anant Geete	NCP	Govindrao Nikam
3	Kolaba	SS	Shyam Sawant	INC	A. R. Antulay
4	Mumbai South	BJP	Jayawantiben Mehta	INC	Milind Deora
5	Mumbai South Central	SS	Mohan Rawale	NCP	Sachin Ahir
6	Mumbai North Central	SS	Manohar Joshi	INC	Eknath Gaikwad
7	Mumbai North East	BJP	Kirit Somaiya	INC	Gurudas Kamat
8	Mumbai North West	SS	Sanjay Nirupam	INC	Sunil Dutt
9	Mumbai North	BJP	Ram Naik	INC	Govinda Ahuja
10	Thane	SS	Prakash Paranjape	NCP	Vasant Davkhare
11	Dahanu (ST)	BJP	Chintaman Vanaga	INC	Damodar Shingada
12	Nashik	SS	Dasharath Patil	NCP	Devidas Pingale
13	Malegaon (ST)	BJP	Harischandra Chavan	JD(S)	Haribahu Mahale
14	Dhule (ST)	BJP	Ramdas Rupla Gavit	INC	Bapu Hari Chaure
15	Nandurbar (ST)	BJP	Natawadkar S. Jayant	INC	Manikrao Gavit
16	Erandol	BJP	Annasaheb M. K. Patil	NCP	Vasantrao More
17	Jalgaon	BJP	Y. G. Mahajan	INC	Ulhas Vasudeo Patil
18	Buldhana (SC)	SS	Anandrao Adsul	INC	Mukul Wasnik
19	Akola	BJP	Sanjay Dhotre	INC	Laxmanrao Tayade
20	Washim	SS	Bhavana Gawali	NCP	Manohar Naik
21	Amravati	SS	Anant Gudhe	RPI	R. S. Gavai
22	Ramtek	SS	Mohite Baburao	INC	Shrikant Jichkar
23	Nagpur	BJP	Atal Bahadur Singh	INC	Vilas Muttemwar
24	Bhandara	BJP	Shishupal Patle	NCP	Praful Patel
25	Chimur	BJP	Mahadeo Shivankar	PRP	Jogendra Kawade
26	Chandrapur	BJP	Hansraj Gangaram Ahir	INC	Nareshkumar Puglia
27	Wardha	BJP	Suresh Wagmare	INC	Prabha Rau
28	Yavatmal	BJP	Harising Rathod	INC	Uttamrao Deorao Patil
29	Hingoli	SS	Shivaji Mane	NCP	Suryakanta Patil
30	Nanded	BJP	D. B. Patil	INC	Bhaskarrao Patil
31	Parbhani	SS	Tukaram Renge Patil	NCP	Suresh Warpudkar
32	Jalna	BJP	Raosaheb Danve	INC	Uttamsingh Pawar
33	Aurangabad	SS	Chandrakant Khaire	INC	Ramkrishna Baba Patil
34	Beed	BJP	Prakashdada Solanke	NCP	Jaisingrao Patil
35	Latur	BJP	Rupatai Nilangekar	INC	Shivraj Patil
36	Osmanabad (SC)	SS	Kalpana Narhire	NCP	Laxman Dhobale
37	Sholapur	BJP	Subhash Deshmukh	INC	Sushilkumar Shinde
38	Pandharpur (SC)	BJP	Kshirsagar N. Dattatray	RPI(A)	Ramdas Athawale
39	Ahmednagar	BJP	N. S. Pharande	NCP	Tukaram Gadakh
40	Kopargaon	SS	Murkute B. Kashinath	INC	Balasaheb Vikhe Patil
41	Khed	SS	Shivajirao Patil	NCP	Ashok N. Mohol
42	Pune	BJP	Pradeep Rawat	INC	Suresh Kalmadi
43	Baramati	BJP	Prithviraj S. Jachak	NCP	Sharad Pawar
44	Satara	SS	Hindurao Nimbalkar	NCP	Laxmanrao Patil
45	Karad	SS	Mankumare V. Dnyandev	NCP	Shriniwas Patil
46	Sangli	BJP	Deepak Shinde Mhaisalkar	INC	Prakashbapu Patil
47	Ichalkaranji	SS	Sanjay Shamrao Patil	NCP	Nivedita Mane
48	Kolhapur	SS	Dhananjay Mahadik	NCP	Sadashivrao Mandlik

== Results ==
Alliance/ Party		Popular vote			Seats		
Alliance/ Party		Votes	%	±pp	Contested	Won	+/−
NDA	BJP	77,45,290	22.61	▲1.43	26	13	Steady
NDA	SHS	68,88,306	20.11	▲3.25	22	12	▼3
NDA	Total	1,46,33,596	42.72	▲4.68	48	25	▼3
UPA	INC	81,43,246	23.77	▼5.94	26	13	▲3
UPA	NCP	62,71,036	18.31	▼3.27	18	9	▲3
UPA	RPI(A)	3,47,215	1.01	▼0.54	1	1	▲1
UPA	RPI	1,50,902	0.44	▼1.00	1	0	Steady
UPA	JD(S)	2,13,731	0.62	▼0.29	1	0	Steady
UPA	PRP	2,37,937	0.69	Steady	1	0	Steady
UPA	Total	1,53,64,067	44.84	▼13.66**	48	23	▲7
Others		29,21,787	8.54	Steady	165	0	Steady
IND		13,33,828	3.89	▲2.17	151	0	Steady
Total		3,42,53,278	100%	-	412	48	-

- **NOTE: The change in UPA vote share is calculated based on the difference from the combined vote share of INC+ and NCP+, which contested the 1999 elections independently as separate alliances.

== List of elected MPs ==
Constituency		Winner				Runner-up				Margin	
Constituency		Candidate	Party	Votes	%	Candidate	Party	Votes	%	Votes	%
1	Rajapur	Suresh Prabhu	SHS	264,001	54.94	Sudhir Sawant	INC	183,102	38.10	80,899	16.84
2	Ratnagiri	Anant Geete	SHS	334,690	59.66	Govindrao Nikam	NCP	185,722	33.11	148,968	26.56
3	Kolaba	A. R. Antulay	INC	312,225	39.35	Vivek Patil	PWPI	280,355	35.33	31,870	4.02
4	Mumbai South	Milind Deora	INC	137,956	50.28	Jayawantiben Mehta	BJP	127,710	46.55	10,246	3.73
5	Mumbai South Central	Mohan Rawale	SHS	128,536	36.94	Sachin Ahir	NCP	106,348	30.56	22,188	6.38
6	Mumbai North Central	Eknath Gaikwad	INC	256,282	49.80	Manohar Joshi	SHS	242,953	47.21	13,329	2.59
7	Mumbai North East	Gurudas Kamat	INC	493,420	53.30	Kirit Somaiya	BJP	394,020	42.57	99,400	10.74
8	Mumbai North West	Sunil Dutt	INC	385,755	51.59	Sanjay Nirupam	SHS	338,397	45.26	47,358	6.33
9	Mumbai North	Govinda	INC	559,763	50.01	Ram Naik	BJP	511,492	45.70	48,271	4.31
10	Thane	Prakash Vishvanath Paranjape	SHS	631,414	48.08	Vasant Davkhare	NCP	609,156	46.39	22,258	1.69
11	Dahanu (ST)	Damodar Shingada	INC	286,004	41.85	Chintaman Vanaga	BJP	222,641	32.58	63,363	9.27
12	Nashik	Devidas Anandrao Pingale	NCP	307,613	46.85	Patil Dasharath Dharmaji	SHS	292,555	44.56	15,058	2.29
13	Malegaon (ST)	Harischandra Chavan	BJP	218,259	36.94	Haribahu Shankar Mahale	JD(S)	213,731	36.18	4,528	0.77
14	Dhule (ST)	Bapu Hari Chaure	INC	210,714	46.25	Ramdas Rupla Gavit	BJP	202,949	44.55	7,765	1.70
15	Nandurbar (ST)	Manikrao Hodlya Gavit	INC	351,911	54.99	Dr. Natawadkar Suhas Jayant	BJP	244,290	38.18	107,621	16.82
16	Erandol	Annasaheb M. K. Patil	BJP	289,559	47.48	Adv. Vasantrao Jeevanrao More	NCP	281,418	46.15	8,141	1.34
17	Jalgaon	Y. G. Mahajan	BJP	298,865	48.44	Dr. Ulhas Vasudeo Patil	INC	278,219	45.09	20,646	3.35
18	Buldhana (SC)	Anandrao Vithoba Adsul	SHS	369,975	48.60	Mukul Wasnik	INC	310,068	40.73	59,907	7.87
19	Akola	Sanjay Shamrao Dhotre	BJP	313,323	42.61	Laxmanrao Tayade	INC	206,952	28.14	106,371	14.46
20	Washim	Bhavana Gawali	SHS	358,682	49.77	Manohar Naik	NCP	297,784	41.32	60,898	8.45
21	Amravati	Anant Gudhe	SHS	203,216	30.04	Bachchu Kadu	IND	188,982	27.94	14,234	2.10
22	Ramtek	Mohite Subodh Baburao	SHS	276,720	42.74	Shrikant Jichkar	INC	262,618	40.56	14,102	2.18
23	Nagpur	Vilas Muttemwar	INC	373,769	47.17	Atal Bahadur Singh	BJP	274,286	34.61	99,483	12.55
24	Bhandara	Shishupal Natthu Patle	BJP	277,388	40.76	Praful Patel	NCP	274,379	40.32	3,009	0.44
25	Chimur	Mahadeo Shivankar	BJP	336,711	43.42	Jogendra Kawade	PRBP	237,937	30.68	98,774	12.74
26	Chandrapur	Hansraj Gangaram Ahir	BJP	366,014	43.51	Nareshkumar Chunnalal Puglia	INC	306,191	36.40	59,823	7.11
27	Wardha	Suresh Ganapat Wagmare	BJP	269,045	42.97	Prabhatại Rau	INC	265,857	42.46	3,188	0.51
28	Yavatmal	Harising Nasaru Rathod	BJP	298,513	44.96	Uttamrao Deorao Patil	INC	241,709	36.40	56,804	8.56
29	Hingoli	Suryakanta Patil	NCP	327,944	45.03	Shivaji Mane	SHS	315,399	43.30	12,545	1.72
30	Nanded	Dinkar Patil	BJP	361,282	45.15	Bhaskarrao Bapurao Khatgaonkar Patil	INC	336,947	42.11	24,335	3.04
31	Parbhani	Tukaram Renge Patil	SHS	339,318	50.20	Suresh Warpudkar	NCP	283,147	41.89	56,171	8.31
32	Jalna	Raosaheb Danve	BJP	369,630	48.87	Uttamsingh Pawar	INC	308,298	40.76	61,332	8.11
33	Aurangabad	Chandrakant Khaire	SHS	477,900	52.37	Ramkrishna Baba Patil	INC	355,977	39.01	121,923	13.36
34	Beed	Jaisingrao Gaikwad Patil	NCP	425,051	48.07	Prakashdada Solanke	BJP	377,639	42.71	47,412	5.36
35	Latur	Rupatai Patil Nilangekar	BJP	404,500	49.19	Shivraj Patil	INC	373,609	45.43	30,891	3.76
36	Osmanabad (SC)	Kalpana Ramesh Narhire	SHS	294,436	46.15	Dhobale Laxman Kondiba	NCP	292,787	45.90	1,649	0.26
37	Sholapur	Subhash Deshmukh	BJP	316,188	48.14	Ujwalatai Sushilkumar Shinde	INC	310,390	47.26	5,798	0.88
38	Pandharpur (SC)	Ramdas Athawale	RPI(A)	347,215	50.38	Kshirsagar Nagnath Dattatray	BJP	247,522	35.92	99,693	14.47
39	Ahmednagar	Tukaram Gangadhar Gadakh	NCP	362,938	52.77	N. S. Pharande	BJP	287,861	41.86	75,077	10.92
40	Kopargaon	Balasaheb Vikhe Patil	INC	356,688	53.34	Murkute Bhanudas Kashinath	SHS	269,357	40.28	87,331	13.06
41	Khed	Shivajirao Adhalarao Patil	SHS	360,501	49.25	Ashok Mohol	NCP	339,691	46.40	20,810	2.84
42	Pune	Suresh Kalmadi	INC	373,774	48.60	Pradip Trimbak Rawat	BJP	300,598	39.09	73,176	9.52
43	Baramati	Sharad Pawar	NCP	634,555	71.03	Prithviraj Sahebrao Jachak	BJP	211,580	23.68	422,975	47.35
44	Satara	Laxmanrao Pandurang Patil	NCP	281,577	41.71	Hindurao Naik Nimbalkar	SHS	277,620	41.13	3,957	0.59
45	Karad	Shriniwas Patil	NCP	436,732	61.12	Mankumare Vasant Dnyandev	SHS	240,002	33.59	196,730	27.53
46	Sangli	Prakashbapu Vasantdada Patil	INC	305,048	44.02	Deepak (Baba) Abasaheb Shinde Mhaisalkar	BJP	223,425	32.24	81,623	11.78
47	Ichalkaranji	Nivedita Sambhajirao Mane	NCP	422,272	53.38	Dr. Patil Sanjay (Dada) Shamrao	SHS	321,223	40.61	101,049	12.77
48	Kolhapur	Sadashivrao Dadoba Mandlik	NCP	401,922	49.42	Dhananjay Mahadik	SHS	387,169	47.60	14,753	1.81

== Bye-Elections Held ==
Constituency			Winner				Runner Up				Margin
No.	Name	Date	Candidate	Party	Votes	%	Candidate	Party	Votes	%	Margin
8	Mumbai North West	November 2005	Priya Dutt	INC	346,294	64.45	Madhukar Sarpotdar	SS	174,750	32.52	171,544
8	Mumbai North West	November 2005	The Mumbai North West Lok Sabha bypoll was held following the death of the incumbent MP, Sunil Dutt.								
22	Ramtek (SC)	2007	Prakash Jadhav	SS	231,241	42.02	Subodh Baburao Mohite	INC	198,669	34.10	32,572
22	Ramtek (SC)	2007	The Ramtek Lok Sabha bypoll was held to fill a vacancy in the constituency.								
10	Thane	2008	Anand Paranjape	SS	462,766	52.02	Sanjeev Naik	NCP	371,894	41.81	90,872
10	Thane	2008	The Thane Lok Sabha bypoll was held to fill a vacancy in the constituency.								

== Region-wise breakup ==
District	Seats					
District	Seats	INC	BJP	SHS	NCP	OTH
Western Maharashtra	12	3	1	1	6	1
Vidarbha	11	1	6	4	0	0
Marathwada	8	0	3	3	2	0
Thane + Konkan	5	2	0	3	0	0
Mumbai	6	5	0	1	0	0
North Maharashtra	6	2	3	0	1	0
Total	48	13	13	12	9	1

== Post-election Union Council of Ministers from Maharashtra ==
#	Name	Constituency	Designation	Department	From	To	Party
1	Sharad Pawar	Baramati	Cabinet Minister	Agriculture; Consumer Affairs, Food and Public Distribution	23 May 2004	22 May 2009	NCP
2	Shivraj Patil	Rajya Sabha*	Cabinet Minister	Home Affairs	23 May 2004	30 November 2008	INC
3	Sushilkumar Shinde	Rajya Sabha*	Cabinet Minister	Power	29 January 2006	22 May 2009	INC
4	A. R. Antulay	Kolaba	Cabinet Minister	Minority Affairs	29 January 2006	22 May 2009	INC
5	Murli Deora	Rajya Sabha*	Cabinet Minister	Petroleum and Natural Gas	29 January 2006	22 May 2009	INC
6	Sunil Dutt	Mumbai North West	Cabinet Minister	Youth Affairs and Sports	23 May 2004	25 May 2005	INC
7	Praful Patel	Rajya Sabha*	Minister of State (Independent Charge)	Civil Aviation	23 May 2004	22 May 2009	NCP
8	Vilas Muttemwar	Nagpur	Minister of State (Independent Charge)	New and Renewable Energy	23 May 2004	22 May 2009	INC
9	Prithviraj Chavan	Rajya Sabha*	Minister of State	Prime Minister's Office; Personnel, Public Grievances and Pensions	23 May 2004	22 May 2009	INC
10	Suryakanta Patil	Hingoli	Minister of State	Parliamentary Affairs; Rural Development	23 May 2004	22 May 2009	NCP
11	Manikrao Hodlya Gavit	Nandurbar (ST)	Minister of State	Home Affairs	23 May 2004	6 April 2008	INC

== Assembly segments wise lead of Parties ==
Party	Assembly segments	Position in Assembly (as of 2004 election)
Indian National Congress	73	69
Bharatiya Janata Party	73	56
Shiv Sena	68	62
Nationalist Congress Party	59	71
Republican Party of India (Athawale)	5	1
Peasants and Workers Party of India	2	2
Janata Dal (Secular)	2	0
Communist Party of India (Marxist)	2	3
Akhil Bharatiya Sena	1	1
Others	3	23
Total	288	
