= Elections in Maharashtra =

Overview of the procedure of elections in the Indian state of Maharashtra

Maharashtra (highlighted) within India

Elections in Maharashtra, a state in India, are conducted in accordance with the Constitution of India. The Assembly of Maharashtra creates laws regarding the conduct of local body elections unilaterally while any changes by the state legislature to the conduct of state level elections need to be approved by the Parliament of India. In addition, the state legislature may be dismissed by the Parliament according to Article 356 of the Indian Constitution and President's rule may be imposed.

== Main political parties ==
| Political Party | Election Symbol | Political Position | Seats in Legislative Assembly |
|---|---|---|---|
| Bharatiya Janata Party (BJP) | | Right-wing | 132 / 288 |
| Shiv Sena | | Right-wing to far-right | 57 / 288 |
| Nationalist Congress Party (NCP) | | Centre | 41 / 288 |
| Shiv Sena (Uddhav Balasaheb Thackeray) (SS(UBT)) | | Right-wing | 20 / 288 |
| Indian National Congress (INC) | | Centre to centre-left | 16 / 288 |
| Nationalist Congress Party (Sharadchandra Pawar) (NCP(SCP)) | | Centre | 10 / 288 |
| Samajwadi Party (SP) | | Centre to left-wing | 2 / 288 |
| Peasants and Workers Party of India | | Left-wing | 1 / 288 |
| All India Majlis-e-Ittehadul Muslimeen | | Ultra-right | 1 / 288 |
| Communist Party of India (Marxist) | | Left-wing | 1 / 288 |
| Republican Party of India | | Centre | 0 / 288 |

== Lok Sabha elections ==
The 1951 and 1957 election are results from Bombay State which has sizable portions of Gujarat in it, but Marathwada and Vidarbha were not included. Maharashtra State was formed on 1 May 1960.

=== As Mumbai State ===
| Lok Sabha | Election Year | 1st Party | 2nd Party | 3rd Party | 4th Party | Others | Total Seats |
|---|---|---|---|---|---|---|---|
| 1st Lok Sabha | 1951-52 | INC 40 | PWPI 1 | SCF 1 | | Independents 3 | 45 |
| 2nd Lok Sabha | 1957 | INC 38 | SCF 5 | PSP 5 | PWPI 4 | CPI 4,BJS 2,MJP 2,PSP 2 ,SMS 2,Independents 2 | 66 |

=== As Maharashtra ===
| Lok Sabha | Election Year | 1st Party | 2nd Party | 3rd Party | 4th Party | Others | Total Seats |
|---|---|---|---|---|---|---|---|
| 3rd Lok Sabha | 1962 | INC 41 | PSP 1 | | | IND 2 | 44 |
| 4th Lok Sabha | 1967 | INC 37 | CPI 2 | SSP 2 | PSP 1 | IND 2,PWPI 1 | 45 |
| 5th Lok Sabha | 1971 | INC 42 | RPI 1 | AIFB 1 | PSP 1 | | 45 |
| 6th Lok Sabha | 1977 | INC 20 | JP 19 | PWPI 5 | CPI(M) 3 | RPI 1 | 48 |
| 7th Lok Sabha | 1980 | INC 39 | JP 8 | INC(U) 1 | | | 48 |
| 8th Lok Sabha | 1984 | INC 43 | JP 1 | PWPI 1 | INC(S) 1 | IND 2 | 48 |
| 9th Lok Sabha | 1989 | INC 28 | BJP 10 | JD 5 | SS 1 | IND 3, CPI 1 | 48 |
| 10th Lok Sabha | 1991 | INC 38 | BJP 5 | SS 4 | CPI(M) 1 | | 48 |
| 11th Lok Sabha | 1996 | BJP 18 | INC 15 | SS 15 | | | 48 |
| 12th Lok Sabha | 1998 | INC 33 | SS 6 | BJP 4 | RPI 4 | PWPI 1 | 48 |
| 13th Lok Sabha | 1999 | SS 15 | BJP 13 | INC 10 | NCP 6 | PWPI 1,BBM 1, JD(S) 1, IND 1 | 48 |
| 14th Lok Sabha | 2004 | INC 13 | BJP 13 | SS 12 | NCP 9 | RPI(A) 1 | 48 |
| 15th Lok Sabha | 2009 | INC 17 | SS 11 | BJP 9 | NCP 8 | SWP 1, BVA 1, IND 1 | 48 |
| 16th Lok Sabha | 2014 | BJP 23 | SS 18 | NCP 4 | INC 02 | SWP 1 | 48 |
| 17th Lok Sabha | 2019 | BJP 23 | SS 18 | NCP 4 | INC 1 | AIMIM 1,IND 1 | 48 |
| 18th Lok Sabha | 2024 | INC 13 | SHS 13, | BJP 9 | NCP(SP) 8 | SS(UBT) 3, NCP 1, IND 1 | 48 |

== Vidhan Sabha elections ==
| Election Year | 1st Party | 2nd Party | 3rd Party | 4th Party | 5th Party | Others | Total Seats | Chief Minister | CM's Party |
|---|---|---|---|---|---|---|---|---|---|
| 1962 | INC 215 | PWPI 15 | PSP 9 | CPI 6 | RPI 6 | SSP 1, IND 15 | 264 | Marotrao Kannamwar | INC |
| 1962 | INC 215 | PWPI 15 | PSP 9 | CPI 6 | RPI 6 | SSP 1, IND 15 | 264 | P. K. Sawant | INC |
| 1962 | INC 215 | PWPI 15 | PSP 9 | CPI 6 | RPI 6 | SSP 1, IND 15 | 264 | Vasantrao Naik | INC |
| 1967 | INC 203 | PWPI 19 | CPI 10 | PSP 8 | RPI 5 | BJS 4, SSP 4, CPI(M) 1, IND 16 | 270 | Vasantrao Naik | INC |
| 1972 | INC 222 | PWPI 7 | BJS 5 | SSP 3 | AIFB 2 | CPI 2, RPI 2, BKD 1, CPIM 1, IUML 1, SS 1, IND 23 | 270 | Vasantrao Naik | INC |
| 1972 | INC 222 | PWPI 7 | BJS 5 | SSP 3 | AIFB 2 | CPI 2, RPI 2, BKD 1, CPIM 1, IUML 1, SS 1, IND 23 | 270 | Shankarrao Chavan | INC |
| 1972 | INC 222 | PWPI 7 | BJS 5 | SSP 3 | AIFB 2 | CPI 2, RPI 2, BKD 1, CPIM 1, IUML 1, SS 1, IND 23 | 270 | Vasantdada Patil | INC |
| 1978 | JP 99 | INC 69 | INC(I) 62 | PWPI 13 | CPI(M) 9 | AIFB 3, RPI(K) 2, RPI 2, CPI 1, IND 28 | 288 | Vasantdada Patil | INC(U) |
| 1978 | JP 99 | INC 69 | INC(I) 62 | PWPI 13 | CPI(M) 9 | AIFB 3, RPI(K) 2, RPI 2, CPI 1, IND 28 | 288 | Sharad Pawar | IC(S) |
| 1980 | INC 186 | INC (Urs) 47 | JP(S) 17 | BJP 14 | PWPI 9 | CPI 2, CPI(M) 2, IND 10 | 288 | A. R. Antulay | INC |
| 1980 | INC 186 | INC (Urs) 47 | JP(S) 17 | BJP 14 | PWPI 9 | CPI 2, CPI(M) 2, IND 10 | 288 | Babasaheb Bhosale | INC |
| 1980 | INC 186 | INC (Urs) 47 | JP(S) 17 | BJP 14 | PWPI 9 | CPI 2, CPI(M) 2, IND 10 | 288 | Vasantdada Patil | INC |
| 1985 | INC 161 | INC(S) 54 | JP 20 | BJP 16 | PWPI 13 | CPI 2, CPI(M) 2, IND 20 | 288 | Shivajirao Patil Nilangekar | INC |
| 1985 | INC 161 | INC(S) 54 | JP 20 | BJP 16 | PWPI 13 | CPI 2, CPI(M) 2, IND 20 | 288 | Shankarrao Chavan | INC |
| 1985 | INC 161 | INC(S) 54 | JP 20 | BJP 16 | PWPI 13 | CPI 2, CPI(M) 2, IND 20 | 288 | Sharad Pawar | INC |
| 1990 | INC 141 | SS 52 | BJP 42 | JD 24 | PWPI 8 | CPI(M) 3, CPI 2, IC(S)-SSS 1, IUML 1, RPI (K) 1, IND 13 | 288 | Sharad Pawar | INC |
| 1990 | INC 141 | SS 52 | BJP 42 | JD 24 | PWPI 8 | CPI(M) 3, CPI 2, IC(S)-SSS 1, IUML 1, RPI (K) 1, IND 13 | 288 | Sudhakarrao Naik | INC |
| 1995 | INC 80 | SS 73 | BJP 65 | JD 11 | PWPI 6 | SP 3, CPI(M) 3, MVC 1, NVAS 1, IND 45 | 288 | Manohar Joshi | SS |
| 1995 | INC 80 | SS 73 | BJP 65 | JD 11 | PWPI 6 | SP 3, CPI(M) 3, MVC 1, NVAS 1, IND 45 | 288 | Narayan Rane | SS |
| 1999 | INC 75 | SS 69 | NCP 58 | BJP 56 | PWPI 6 | BBM 3, JD 2, SP 2, CPI(M) 2, RPI 1, GGP 1, NPP 1, SJP (M) 1, IND 12 | 288 | Vilasrao Deshmukh | INC |
| 1999 | INC 75 | SS 69 | NCP 58 | BJP 56 | PWPI 6 | BBM 3, JD 2, SP 2, CPI(M) 2, RPI 1, GGP 1, NPP 1, SJP (M) 1, IND 12 | 288 | Sushilkumar Shinde | INC |
| 2004 | NCP 71 | INC 69 | SS 62 | BJP 54 | JSS 4 | CPI(M) 3, PWPI 2, BBM 1, RPI(A) 1, SBP 1, ABS 1, IND 12 | 288 | Vilasrao Deshmukh | INC |
| 2004 | NCP 71 | INC 69 | SS 62 | BJP 54 | JSS 4 | CPI(M) 3, PWPI 2, BBM 1, RPI(A) 1, SBP 1, ABS 1, IND 12 | 288 | Ashok Chavan | INC |
| 2009 | INC 82 | NCP 62 | BJP 46 | SS 44 | MNS 13 | PWPI 4, SP 4, JSS 2, BVA 2, BBM 1, CPI(M) 1, RSP 1, SWP 1, LS 1, IND 24 | 288 | Ashok Chavan | INC |
| 2009 | INC 82 | NCP 62 | BJP 46 | SS 44 | MNS 13 | PWPI 4, SP 4, JSS 2, BVA 2, BBM 1, CPI(M) 1, RSP 1, SWP 1, LS 1, IND 24 | 288 | Prithviraj Chavan | INC |
| 2014 | BJP 122 | SS 63 | INC 42 | NCP 41 | BVA 3 | PWPI 3, AIMIM 2, BBM 1, CPI(M) 1, MNS 1, RSP 1, SP 1, IND 7 | 288 | Devendra Fadnavis | BJP |
| 2019 | BJP 105 | SS 56 | NCP 54 | INC 44 | BVA 3 | AIMIM 2, PJP 2, SP 2, CPI(M) 1, JSS 1, KSP 1, MNS 1, RSP 1, SWP 1, IND 13 | 288 | Devendra Fadnavis | BJP |
| 2019 | BJP 105 | SS 56 | NCP 54 | INC 44 | BVA 3 | AIMIM 2, PJP 2, SP 2, CPI(M) 1, JSS 1, KSP 1, MNS 1, RSP 1, SWP 1, IND 13 | 288 | Uddhav Thackeray | SS |
| 2019 | BJP 105 | SS 56 | NCP 54 | INC 44 | BVA 3 | AIMIM 2, PJP 2, SP 2, CPI(M) 1, JSS 1, KSP 1, MNS 1, RSP 1, SWP 1, IND 13 | 288 | Eknath Shinde | SHS |
| 2024 | BJP 132 | SHS 57 | NCP 41 | SS(UBT) 20 | INC 16 | NCP(SP) 10, JSS 2, SP 2, RYSP 1, RSVA 1, PWPI 1, CPI(M) 1, AIMIM 1, RSP 1, IND 2 | 288 | Devendra Fadnavis | BJP |
