= Shridharrao Jawade =

Indian politician

Member of Parliament, Lok Sabha
- In office (1977–1980)
- Preceded by: Sadashivrao Bapuji Thakre
- Succeeded by: Uttamrao Deorao Patil
- Constituency: Yavatmal, Maharashtra

Member of Maharashtra Legislative Assembly
- In office (1957–1962)
- Preceded by: Deorao Yeshwantrao Gohokar
- Succeeded by: Vithalrao Yeshwantrao Gohokar
- Constituency: Wani
- In office (1952–1957)
- Constituency: Wadhona Assembly constituency

Personal details
- Born: Chahand Village, Yavatmal district, Bombay Presidency, British India
- Party: Indian National Congress
- Spouse: Pramilibai S. Jawade

Shridharrao Anthoba Jawade, also known as Bhaiyasaheb Jawade, is an Indian politician. He was elected to the Lok Sabha, the lower house of the Parliament of India as a member of the Indian National Congress.
