= Nirmala Samant Prabhavalkar =

Indian lawyer and local politician

Nirmala Samant Prabhavalkar is the former Mayor of Mumbai and an advocate. She was elected as the mayor in year 1994. Part of the Indian National Congress party, Prabhavalkar is the second female mayor of the metropolitan. She was also the chief functionary of Centre for Study of Social Change (CSSC) and part of National Commission for Women. Nirmala was part of the 10 member committee formed by Women and Child Department of Maharashtra that aimed to reduce child marriages in the state.

== Awards ==
- Sahyadri Hirkari Award, 2014
