= Sadashivrao Bapuji Thakre =

Indian politician (1925–2020)

Member of Parliament, Lok Sabha
- In office 1971–1977
- Preceded by: Deorao Shioram Patil
- Succeeded by: Shridharrao Jawade
- Constituency: Yavatmal

Member of Legislative Assembly of Maharashtra
- In office 1985–1990
- Preceded by: BhauJambuwantrao Dhote
- Succeeded by: Jawahar Deshmukh Parvekar alias Annasaheb Parvekar
- Constituency: Yavatmal

Personal details
- Born: 14 June 1925 Inzala, Ghatanji Taluka, Yavatmal District
- Died: 9 June 2020 (aged 94) Yavatmal, Maharashtra
- Party: Indian National Congress

Sadashivrao Bapuji Thakre (14 June 1925 – 9 June 2020) was an Indian politician. He was elected to the Maharashtra Legislative Assembly from Yavatmal, Maharashtra as a member of the Indian National Congress.
