= Mohite Subodh Baburao =

Indian politician

Subodh Mohite
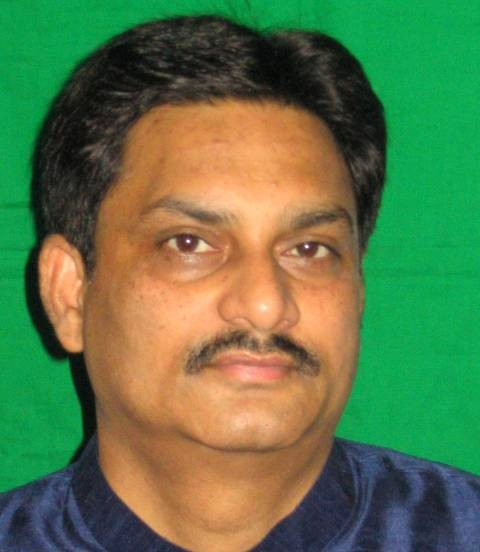

Union Minister of Heavy Industries and Public Enterprises
- In office 24 May 2003 – 22 May 2004
- Prime Minister: Atal Bihari Vajpayee
- Preceded by: Balasaheb Vikhe Patil
- Succeeded by: Santosh Mohan Dev

Member of Parliament, Lok Sabha
- In office 6 October 1999 – 14 February 2007
- Preceded by: Rani Chitralekha Bhonsle
- Succeeded by: Prakash Jadhav
- Constituency: Ramtek (SC)

Personal details
- Born: 17 October 1961 (age 64) Nagpur, Maharashtra
- Party: Nationalist Congress Party (2021-present)
- Other political affiliations: Indian National Congress (2007-2021); Shiv Sena (until 2007)

Subodh Baburao Mohite (born 17 October 1961) is a member of the Nationalist Congress Party and was a member of the 14th Lok Sabha of India. He represented the Ramtek constituency of Maharashtra and was a member of the Shiv Sena (SS) political party until February 2007. According to recent developments he has left the party and joined the Indian National Congress.
