= Gunwantrao Rambhau Sarode =

Indian politician (1940–2018)

Gunwantrao Sarode
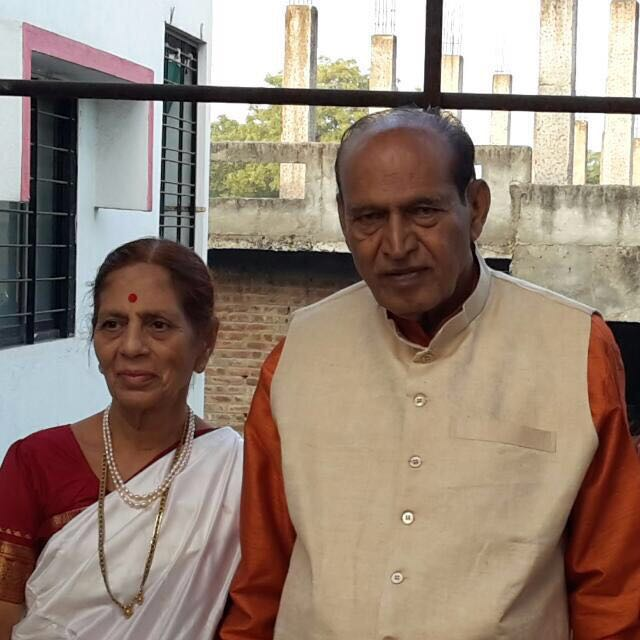

Member of Parliament, Lok Sabha
- In office 1991–1998
- Preceded by: Yadav Shivram Mahajan
- Succeeded by: Ulhas Vasudeo Patil
- Constituency: Jalgaon

Member of Maharashtra Legislative Assembly
- In office 1985–1990
- Preceded by: Ramkrishna Patil
- Succeeded by: Madhukar Chaudhari
- Constituency: Raver

Personal details
- Born: 3 April 1940 Maksawad Jalgaon district, Maharashtra
- Died: 2 December 2018 (aged 78) Jalgaon
- Party: Bharatiya Janata Party
- Spouse: Shyamala (m. 1963)
- Children: 1 son, 2 daughters
- Education: B J Medical College & Sasoon Hospital, Pune
- Profession: Politician

Dr. Gunwantrao Rambhau Sarode was a former Indian politician who was a member of the 10th and the 11th national Lok Sabhas. He represented the Jalgaon Constituency of Maharashtra and was a member of the Bharatiya Janata Party. He was also a member of the Maharashtra Legislative Assembly for the Raver constituency in Jalgaon district.
