= Haribahu Shankar Mahale =

Indian politician

Haribahu Shankar Mahale was a member of the 13th Lok Sabha of India. He represented the Malegaon constituency of Maharashtra and was a member of the Bharatiya Janata Party political party.
