= Rani Chitralekha Bhonsle =

Indian politician and social worker

MP
- Constituency: Ramtek

Personal details
- Born: Chitralekha Kadam; 26 February 1941
- Died: 16 August 2015
- Party: Indian National Congress
- Spouse: Raja Tejsingrao Bhonsle of Nagpur
- Parent: Sharas Chandra Kadam (father)
- Profession: Agriculturist, Politician, Social Worker, Educationalist

Rani Chitralekha Bhonsle (26 February 1941 – 16 August 2015) was a political and social worker and a member of parliament elected from the Ramtek constituency in the Indian state of Maharashtra being an Indian National Congress candidate.

== Early life ==
Bhonsle was born on 26 February 1941 in Baroda in the Indian state of Gujarat. She married Tejsingrao Bhonsle on 25 December 1959 and has two sons, Laxmansingh and Mansingh as well as three daughters, Lalitaraje, Menkaraje and Ketkiraje.

== Education & interests ==
Rani completed her Bachelor of Arts from Sahajirao Gaikwad College, M.S. University, Baroda (Gujarat). Her interests include painting and reading. She is also a Chairperson of the District Volleyball Association, Nagpur.

== Career ==
Rani was elected to the 12th Lok Sabha in 1998. During 1998–99, she was a Member on the Consultative Committee, Ministry of Coal.
