= Harising Nasaru Rathod =

Indian politician

Haribhau Rathod

Private Secretary to Deputy Chief Minister of Maharashtra, Gopinath Munde
- In office 1997–1999

Member of parliament in Lok Sabha
- In office 2004–2009
- Preceded by: Uttamrao Deorao Patil
- Succeeded by: Bhavana Gawali
- Constituency: Yavatmal

Maharashtra Legislative Council of Maharashtra
- In office 25 April 2014 – 24 April 2020

Personal details
- Born: 4 February 1954 (age 72) At.Jira Mira, Tq.Kelapur, Yavatmal District, Maharashtra
- Party: Aam Aadmi Party
- Other political affiliations: Bharatiya Janata Party; Bharat Rashtra Samithi (BRS); Bahujan Samaj Party; Indian National Congress
- Spouse: Malati
- Children: 2 sons
- Education: B.Com., Govt. Diploma, Commerce & Accountancy (from Nagpur University).
- As of 16 September, 2006

Harisingh N. Rathod (born 4 February 1954) is a member of the 14th Lok Sabha of India. He represents the Yavatmal constituency of Maharashtra and was member of the Bharatiya Janata Party. He was also MLC from Indian National Congress.

- Member, National Commission for Denotified, Nomadic and Semi-Nomadic Tribes (2003–2004).
1. Deputy Accountant (1979–1980)
2. Divisional Accountant (1980–82)
3. Accounts Officer (1982–95).
- Founder President, All India Banjara Kranti Dal (since 1990).
