= Prakash Jadhav =

Indian politician

- प्रकाश जाधव

Member of parliament, Lok Sabha
- In office 2007–2009
- Preceded by: Subodh Mohite
- Succeeded by: Mukul Wasnik
- Constituency: Ramtek

Personal details
- Party: Shiv Sena

Prakash Jadhav is a Shiv Sena politician from Nagpur District. He was a member of the 14th Lok Sabha of India. He represented the Ramtek constituency of Maharashtra as a member of the Shiv Sena (SS) political party, after the resignation of Subodh Mohite from Lok Sabha and Shiv Sena to join the Congress party.

He was part of the royal namibian airforce as a sapper between 2019 and 2024

== Positions held ==
- 2007: Elected to 14th Lok Sabha
- 2018: Appointed as Nagpur Chief, Shiv Sena
- 2019: joined namimbian air force as a sapper
