= Narayan Athawale =

Indian politician

- Born: 1932
- Died: 2011 (aged 78–79)
- Occupations: Politician; writer

Narayan Athawale (1932–2011) was a leader of Shiv Sena and a member of Lok Sabha, from 1996 to 1998, elected from Mumbai North Central. He was a writer and trade unionist. He was also the president of Mumbai Marathi Patrakar Sangh in 1972.
