= Rajabhau Ganeshrao Thakre =

Indian politician

Rajendra (Rajabhau) Thakre

Member of Parliament, Lok Sabha
- In office 1996–1998
- Preceded by: Uttamrao Deorao Patil
- Succeeded by: Uttamrao Deorao Patil
- Constituency: Yavatmal

Member of Legislative Assembly of Maharashtra
- In office 1995–1999
- Preceded by: Jawahar Trimbakrao Deshmukh Alias Annasaheb parvekar
- Succeeded by: Kirti Dhanraj Gandhi
- Constituency: Yavatmal

Minister of State Government of Maharashtra
- In office 1995–1996
- Minister: Ministry of Dairy Development; Veterinary and Fisheries
- Chief Minister: Manohar Joshi

Vice-President of Bharatiya Janata Party - Yavatmal District
- In office 1991–1995

Personal details
- Born: 15 April 1952 (age 73) At.Watakheda Wardha district
- Party: Bharatiya Janata Party
- Other political affiliations: Nationalist Congress Party
- Spouse: Smt. Shobha Thakre
- Children: Two sons
- Education: BE (Civil) Educated at Engineering College, Amaravati (Maharashtra)
- Occupation: Politician, Engineer and Farmer

Rajendra alias Rajabhau Ganeshrao Thakre is a Bharatiya Janata Party politician from Yavatmal district, Maharashtra. He was the member of the Maharashtra Legislative Assembly from Yavatmal Assembly Constituency.
