= Uttamrao Deorao Patil =

Indian politician (1944–2012)

Uttamrao Dada Patil 'दादा'

Member of Parliament, Lok Sabha
- In office (1980-1984),(1984-1989),(1989-1991),(1991 – 1996)
- Preceded by: Shridharrao Jawade
- Succeeded by: Rajabhau Ganeshrao Thakre
- Constituency: Yavatmal, Maharashtra
- In office (1998-1999),(1999 – 2004)
- Preceded by: Rajabhau Ganeshrao Thakre
- Succeeded by: Harising Nasaru Rathod

Member of Legislative Assembly of Maharashtra
- In office (1972–1977)
- Preceded by: K.D. Mahindre
- Succeeded by: Nanabhau Naraynrao Yembadwar
- Constituency: Digras (Vidhan Sabha constituency)

Personal details
- Born: Uttamrao Deorao Patil; 25 December 1944 Loni, Yavatmal, Bombay Presidency, British India
- Died: 10 March 2012 (aged 67) Nagpur, Maharashtra, India
- Party: Nationalist Congress Party (November 2011-March 2012)
- Other political affiliations: Indian National Congress (Before Nov 2011)
- Spouse: Smt. Sushila Patil
- Children: 1 Daughter & 2 Son Manish Uttamrao Patil; Rajendra Uttamrao Patil Grandson = Vatsal Patil
- Parent: Deorao alias Bhausaheb Patil (Father)
- Education: B.Sc. (Agriculture)

Uttamrao Deorao Patil (25 December 1944 – 10 March 2012) was an Indian politician. His father was elected as MLA From Darwha twice in 1952 & 1957 & MP from Yavatmal twice in 1962 & 1967 and Rajya Sabha MP in 1974. He himself was elected to Maharashtra Vidhan Sabha from Digras in 1972. He represented Yavatmal constituency, which is in the state of Maharashtra, in Lok Sabha, as a member of Indian National Congress, from 1980 to 1996, and 1998 to 2004, winning six elections in that span. He did not contest the 1996 Lok Sabha election. In 2004 elections, he was defeated by Harisingh Rathod of BJP.In November 2011, he quit Congress, complaining that his supporters were getting sidelined, and joined NCP. He died four months later.
