= Madan Patil =

Indian politician

Madan Vishwanathrao Patil
- Born: 2 December 1960; Sangli, Maharashtra
- Died: 16 October 2015 (aged 55–56); Mumbai, India
- Spouse: Jayashree madan patil
- Children: Sonia Patil-Holkar, Monika Patil-Kadam

Madan Vishwanathrao Patil (2 December 1960–16 October 2015) was a member of the 12th Lok Sabha of India. He is son of Vishwanathrao Shamrao Patil & also grandson of former chief minister of maharashtra Padmabhushan Vasantdada Patil. He has a B.Com. (Hons.) (Chintaman Rao College ), Shivaji University, Sangli (Maharashtra). He represented the Sangli constituency of Maharashtra and is a member of the Indian National Congress (INC) political party.

He was also a member of the 12th Lok Sabha from Sangli, Maharashtra. He was Member of 2009 Maharashtra Legislative Assembly from Sangli constituency. He was Cabinet Minister for Women and Child Affairs in the Ashok Chavan led Cabinet of State of Maharashtra.
