= Ramdas Rupla Gavit =

Indian politician

Ramdas Gavit

Member of Parliament, Lok Sabha
- In office 1999–2004
- Preceded by: Dhanaji Ahire
- Succeeded by: Bapu Hari Chaure
- Constituency: Dhule

Personal details
- Born: 1 January 1940 Pinjarzadi, Dhule district
- Died: 19 April 2020 (aged 80) Dhule, Maharashtra
- Political party: Bharatiya Janata Party
- Spouse: Vanmala (m. 1964)
- Children: 1 son, 2 daughters
- Parents: Rupala Gavit (father); Bayabai Gavit (mother)
- Education: Master of Arts
- Alma mater: Pune University

Ramdas Rupla Gavit was a member of the 13th Lok Sabha of India. He represented the Dhule constituency of Maharashtra and is a member of the Bharatiya Janata Party political party.
