= Bhaskarrao Bapurao Khatgaonkar Patil =

Indian politician

Bhaskarrao Patil Khatgaonkar
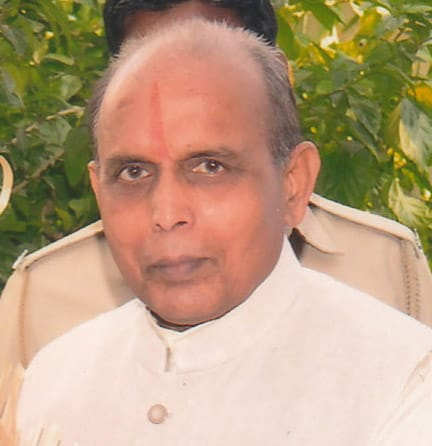

Member of Parliament, Lok Sabha
- In office: (1998–1999),(1999–2004),(2009–2014)
- Preceded by: Gangadharrao Deshmukh Kunturkar
- Succeeded by: Digamber Patil; Ashok Chavan
- Constituency: Nanded

Minister of State Government of Maharashtra
- In office 1991–1993
- Governor: C. Subramaniam; P. C. Alexander
- Chief Minister: Sudhakarrao Naik; Sharad Pawar
- Cabinet: Sudhakarrao Naik ministry
- Departments: Co-operation; Home (Jail); Rural Development and Rehabilitation

Member of Maharashtra Legislative Assembly
- In office: (1990–1995),(1995–1999),(2004–2009)
- Preceded by: Gangadhar Mohanrao Deshmukh
- Succeeded by: Gangaram Poshetti Thakkarwad (Biloli); Raosaheb Antapurkar (Deglur)
- Constituency: Biloli Assembly Constituency (1990–1999); Deglur Assembly constituency (2004–2009)

Personal details
- Born: 23 July 1944 (age 82) Khatgaon, Biloli, Nanded district
- Party: Indian National Congress
- Other political affiliations: Bharatiya Janata Party
- Spouse: Abhiyanta Bhaskarrao Patil Khatgaonkar

Bhaskarrao Bapurao Patil is an Indian politician from Maharashtra belonging to Indian National Congress who served as the Member of the Maharashtra Legislative Assembly from 1990 to 1998. He was a member in the 12th, 13th and 15th Lok Sabha’s. He was also a member of Maharashtra State Assembly (M.L.A) for 3 times. He was elected from the Biloli Constituency (now Deglur) in the years 1990, 1995 and 2004.

He was a member of Committee on Commerce, Consultative Committee, Ministry of Agriculture, Committee of Defense, and Joint Committee on Salaries and Allowances of Members of Parliament during his three Lok Sabha memberships.

He was Maharashtra Government Minister for Co-operative, Home(Jail), Rural Development & Rehabilitation in Congress Government led by Sharad Pawar and Sudhakar Rao Naik.

Bhaskarrao Patil Khatgaonkar founded the Godavari Manar Sahakari Karkhana. Through the Godavari Manar Sahakari Karkhana, he has helped lakhs of farmers and his constituents from Nanded through employment. Hence, he is popular amongst the masses. His work helped agricultural labor, dry land farming, rural development and water conservation programs. His public relations made him leader of masses and therefore he got elected thrice as Member of Parliament from Nanded Lok Sabha Constituency as well as thrice to Maharashtra Legislative Assembly from Biloli (now Deglur) constituency.

He has worked for the welfare of the poor farmers and agricultural laborers in the rural areas of Nanded district, construction of link-roads, providing facilities of drinking water, electricity especially in Dalit basti area of Nanded; implementation of Govt. schemes like Sanjay Gandhi Niradhar Yojana and Shetkari Pension Yojana in Biloli Taluka of Nanded.

His areas of interest include upliftment of agricultural labourers & dry land farmers, rural development, water conservation, integrated development & welfare of the people belonging to Below Poverty Line group in rural areas of Nanded.

He has been diligent in co-operative sector to help his constituents. He also occupied the following positions

1. Founder Chairman - Godavari Manar Sahakari Sakhar Karkhana, Nanded

2. Founder Chairman- Shri Narsinha Cotton Spinning Mill Ltd, Khanapur, Nanded

3. Chairman, Nanded District Central Co-operative Bank Ltd, Nanded

4. Vice-Chairman, Maharashtra State Cotton Producer Co-operative Marketing Federation, 1986-1988

5. President, Maharashtra State Sugar Federation Ltd., 2001-2002

6. Vice-President, Maharashtra State Sugar Federation Ltd.

7. Director - Nanded Co-operative Spinning Mill

8. Director - The Premier Co-operative Printers; (iii)

9. Director - State Bank of Hyderabad, 1971-1976

10. Director - Marathwada Gramin Bank, 1976-1982

11. Director - Nanded Co-operative Industrial Estate

12. Director - Maharashtra State Co-operative Bank Ltd.,1986-1991

13. Founder - Godavari Manar Charitable Trust

14. Member, Governing Council, Shri Guru Gobind Singhji College of Engineering and Technology, 1983-1991

His topics of interest are co-operative movement and education in rural areas, favored activities of leisure being reading and travel. He has traveled to France, Japan, Thailand, U.K. and U.S.A.

He held top positions in various Government and Non-Government Organizations and is known as one of the pioneers in Co-operative Movement of Nanded district and Maharashtra.

== Early life and family ==
He was born in Khatgaon, Nanded on 23 July 1944 to Manjulabai and Bapurao Bhimrao Patil Khatgaonkar. His elder brother is revered literaturist Hon. Madhukarrao Bapurao Patil Khatgaonkar.

Bhaskarrao Patil Khatgaonkar holds a degree in Mechanical Engineering from Osmania University.^{[11]}

He is married and has a son, Niranjan Bhaskarrao Patil, a successful businessman in the field of hospitality and construction. His daughter-in-law, Dr Meenal Niranjan Patil Khatgaonkar is an active member of the Bhartiya Janata Party and an elected member of Zilla Parishad Nanded.

His father-in-law is late Shankarrao Chavan, former Home Minister in the Government of India. His brother-in-law is Ashok Chavan, former Chief Minister of Maharashtra.
