= Suresh Jadhav =

Indian politician (born 1958)

Member of Parliament, Lok Sabha
- In office 1996-1998, 1999-2004
- Constituency: Parbhani

Personal details
- Born: 7 December 1958 (age 67) Parbhani, Bombay State
- Party: Shiv Sena
- Children: Shantiswaroop Jadhav

Suresh Ramrao Jadhav is an Indian politician. He was elected to the Lok Sabha, lower house of the Parliament of India from Parbhani, Maharashtra as a member of the Shiv Sena.

== International tour ==
He visited China, Singapore, Thailand and also as a Member of Indian Parliamentary Delegation to D.P.R. Korea in September 1996.
