= Ashok Mohol =

Indian politician

Member of Parliament, Lok Sabha
- In office 1998-2004
- Preceded by: Nivrutti Sherkar
- Succeeded by: Shivajirao Adhalarao Patil
- Constituency: Khed, Maharashtra

Personal details
- Born: 19 October 1941 (age 84) Vasai, Thane district, Bombay Presidency, British India
- Party: Nationalist Congress Party
- Other political affiliations: Indian National Congress
- Spouse: Meera Ashok Mohol

Ashok Namdeorao Mohol is an Indian politician. He was elected to the Lok Sabha, the lower house of the Parliament of India.
