= Zamru Manglu Kahandole =

Indian politician (born 1930)

Member of Parliament, Lok Sabha
- In office 1967–1977, 1980–1984, 1991–1996, 1998–1999
- Constituency: Malegaon, Maharashtra

Personal details
- Born: 20 March 1930
- Party: Indian National Congress
- Spouse: Kamalabai Zambru Kahandole
- Children: 2 Sons and 2 daughters

Zamru Manglu Kahandole (born 20 March 1930) was an Indian politician. He was elected from the Malegaon in Maharashtra to the lower House of the Indian Parliament the Lok Sabha as a member of the Indian National Congress.
