= Shivaji Mane =

Indian politician

Shivaji Mane was a member of the 11th Lok Sabha & 13th Lok Sabha of India. He represented the Hingoli constituency of Maharashtra as a Shiv Sena candidate. Currently, Mane is a member of the Nationalist Congress Party.
