= Shivaji Kamble =

Indian politician

member of parliament
- In office 1996–1998
- Constituency: Osmanabad

Member of Parliament
- In office 1999–2004

Personal details
- Party: Shiv Sena
- Parent: Vitthal Rajaram Kamble

Shivaji Kamble was a member of the 11th Lok Sabha & 13th Lok Sabha of India. He represented the Osmanabad constituency of Maharashtra and was a member of the Shiv Sena .
