= Uttamsingh Pawar =

Indian politician

Member of the Lok Sabha
- Constituency: Jalna

Personal details
- Party: Bharatiya Janata Party, Janata Party

Uttamsingh Pawar was a member of the 11th Lok Sabha and 12th Lok Sabha of India. He represented the Jalna constituency of Maharashtra and was a member of the Bharatiya Janata Party, as well as Janata Party.
