= Prakash Vishvanath Paranjape =

Indian politician

Prakash Vishwanath Paranjape

Member of Parliament
- In office 1996-2008
- Preceded by: Ram Kapse
- Succeeded by: Anand Paranjape
- Constituency: Thane

Personal details
- Born: 28 July 1947 Raigad, Maharashtra
- Died: 20 February 2008 (aged 60) Thane, Mumbai
- Party: Shiv Sena
- Spouse: Supriya Prakash Paranjpe
- Children: 2 sons

Prakash Vishvanath Paranjape (28 July 1947 – 20 February 2008) was a member of the Lok Sabha representing the constituency of Thane. He was a member of the Shiv Sena party and served as a member of the Lok Sabha from 1996 until his death.

Paranjape was born in Panvel, Maharashtra on 28 July 1947. Before being elected to Parliament he held several posts in the Thane local government. He married Supriya Prakash Paranjpe on 15 May 1972.

Paranjape died on 20 February 2008, aged 60, following a long battle with cancer.
