= Hindurao Naik Nimbalkar =

Indian politician

Hindurao Nilkanthrao Naik Nimbalkar (born 15 August 1948 in Shendewadi, Satara Maharashtra) Died on 15 March 2020 was an Indian politician and member of the Shiv Sena but earlier joining politics he was member of Indian National Congress Party. Naik Nimbalkar was a member of the 11th Lok Sabha from the Satara constituency in Maharashtra.
