= Anant Gudhe =

Indian politician

Member of Parliament, Lok Sabha
- In office 6 October 1999 – 16 May 2009
- Preceded by: R. S. Gavai
- Succeeded by: Anandrao Vithoba Adsul
- Constituency: Amravati
- In office 9 May 1996 – 4 March 1998
- Preceded by: Smt.Pratibha Tai Patil
- Succeeded by: R. S. Gavai
- Constituency: Amravati

Personal details
- Born: 16 March 1956 (age 70) Amravati, Maharashtra
- Party: Shiv Sena (UBT)
- Spouse: Vijaya Anantrao Gudhe
- Children: 2 sons
- As of 16 September, 2006

Anant Gudhe (born 16 March 1956) was a member of the 11th, 13th and 14th Lok Sabha of India. He represented the Amravati constituency of Maharashtra and is a member of the Shiv Sena (SS) political party.

Lok Sabha
Preceded by Pratibha Patil	Member for Amravati; 1996–1998	Succeeded by R S Gavai
Lok Sabha
Preceded by R S Gavai	Member for Amravati; 1999–2009	Succeeded by Anandrao Adsul
