= Annasaheb M. K. Patil =

Indian politician

Minister of state for Rural Development
- In office 1 September 2001 – 22 May 2004
- Prime Minister: Atal Bihari Vajpayee
- Minister: Venkaiah Naidu; Shanta Kumar; Kashiram Rana

Member of Parliament, Lok Sabha
- In office 1996–2007
- Preceded by: Vijaykumar Naval Patil
- Succeeded by: Vasantrao More
- Constituency: Erandol

Personal details
- Born: 15 September 1939 (age 86) Hatgaon, Jalgaon District, Maharashtra
- Party: Bharatiya Janata Party
- Spouse: Lilavati (m. 1962)
- Children: 2 sons, 1 daughter
- Parents: Kisanrao Patil (father); Reshma Bai (mother)
- Education: M.Sc (Chemical Engineering); ANSI Sugar Technology
- Alma mater: Pune University; Louisiana State University

Annasaheb M. K. Patil (born 15 September 1939) is an Indian politician with the Bharatiya Janata Party (BJP). He was a member of parliament in the 14th Lok Sabha of India, representing the Erandol constituency of Maharashtra. In the National Democratic Alliance (NDA) government, he was Minister of State for Rural Development.
