= Yavatmal Lok Sabha constituency =

Lok Sabha constituency in Maharashtra

Coordinates: 20.4°N 78.1°E

Yavatmal
- Former Lok Sabha constituency

Constituency details
- Country: India
- Region: Western India
- State: Maharashtra
- Established: 1951
- Abolished: 2008

Yavatmal (formerly known as Yeotmal) was one of the 48 Lok Sabha constituencies of Maharashtra state in western India. This constituency was spread over Yavatmal and Chandrapur districts. In 2008, constituency borders were re-drawn.

== Members of Parliament ==
Year	Member	Party
1951	Sahadeo Bharti	Indian National Congress
1957	Deorao Yeshwantrao Gohokar	Indian National Congress
1962	Bhausaheb Alias Deorao Shioram Patil	Indian National Congress
1967	Bhausaheb Alias Deorao Shioram Patil	Indian National Congress
1971	Sadashivrao Thakre	Indian National Congress
1977	Shridharrao Jawade	Indian National Congress
1980	Uttamrao Deorao Patil	Indian National Congress (I)
1984	Uttamrao Deorao Patil	Indian National Congress
1989	Uttamrao Deorao Patil	Indian National Congress
1991	Uttamrao Deorao Patil	Indian National Congress
1996	Rajabhau Thakre	Bharatiya Janata Party
1998	Uttamrao Deorao Patil	Indian National Congress
1999	Uttamrao Deorao Patil	Indian National Congress
2004	Harising Rathod	Bharatiya Janata Party
2008 Onwards : See Yavatmal-Washim Lok Sabha constituency

== Election result ==
=== General election 2004 ===
2004 Indian general election: Yavatmal
Party	Candidate	Votes	%	±%
BJP	Harising Rathod	298,513	44.95	
INC	Uttamrao Patil	241,709	36.40	
BSP	Ramesh Agarwal	30,137	4.53	
SP	Kishorbhau Tiwari	26,927	4.10	
GGP	Sheetal Kavadooji Markam	23,995	3.60	
BBM	Anand Baliram Gaikwad	15,273	2.30	
Independent	Damadu Nagorao Kumbhekar	12,297	1.90	
Independent	Purushottam Domaji Bhajgaware	10,865	1.60	
Margin of victory		56,804	8.55	
Turnout		663,978		
BJP hold		Swing		

=== General election 1999 ===
1999 Indian general election: Yavatmal
Party	Candidate	Votes	%	±%
INC	Uttamrao Patil	258,535	42.01	
BJP	Harising Rathod	243,309	39.54	
NCP	Rajabhau Thakre	77,968	12.67	
Independent	Kishorbhau Tiwari	19,076	3.10	
GGP	Sheetal Kavadooji Markam	14,181	2.30	
Margin of victory		15,226	2.47	
Turnout		615,388	64.39	
INC hold		Swing		

=== General election 1998 ===
1998 Indian general election: Yavatmal
Party	Candidate	Votes	%	±%
INC	Uttamrao Patil	291,415	47.71	
BJP	Rajabhau Thakre	236,742	38.76	
JD	Anil Anna Gote	58,749	9.62	
GGP	Niranjan Sitaram Meshram	7,678	1.20	
BSP	Dasharath Pandurang Madavi	6,983	1.10	
SJP(R)	Bhau Jambuwantrao Dhote	6,781	1.10	
Margin of victory		54,673	8.80	
Turnout		6,22,446	60.30	
INC gain from BJP		Swing		

=== General election 1996 ===
1996 Indian general election: Yavatmal
Party	Candidate	Votes	%	±%
BJP	Rajabhau Thakre	267,519	45.40	
INC	Ghulam Nabi Azad	228,957	38.90	
JD	Pratap Lalsing Rathod	33,023	5.71	
Pavitra Hindustan Kaazhagam	Anil Anna Gote	17,457	3.00	
BSP	Pushpatai Pundlik Atram	5,134	0.90	
Margin of victory		38,562	6.50	
Turnout		5,89,243	58.58	
BJP gain from INC		Swing		

=== General election 1991 ===
1991 Indian general election: Yavatmal
Party	Candidate	Votes	%	±%
INC	Uttamrao Patil	187,861	43.91	
JD	Narayan Sitaram Ole Patil	116,931	27.33	
BJP	Rajabhau Thakre	92,064	21.52	
Jharkhand Party	Bhau Jambuwantrao Dhote	5,704	1.30	
BSP	Dashrath Pandurang Madavi	4,079	0.90	
Independent	Adv. Chandrakant Ruikar	3,765	0.90	
Margin of victory		70,930	16.58	
Turnout		4,33,792	48.41	
INC hold		Swing		

=== General election 1989 ===
1989 Indian general election: Yavatmal
Party	Candidate	Votes	%	±%
INC	Uttamrao Patil	228,713	43.85	
Independent	Sureshbabu Lonkar Patil	201,974	38.72	
Independent	Namdeorao Khobragade	13,862	2.66	
JD	Ramesh Shridharpant Malvi	12,269	2.35	
BSP	Pushpatai Pundlik Atram	12,063	2.31	
Independent	Pande Shriram Gunaji	10,579	2.03	
Independent	Madhukar Wasudeorao Onkar	10,443	2.00	
Margin of victory		26,739	5.13	
Turnout		521,600	59.97	
INC hold		Swing		

=== General election 1984 ===
1984 Indian general election: Yavatmal
Party	Candidate	Votes	%	±%
INC	Uttamrao Patil	274,957	63.63	
IC(S)	Janmohammed Noormohammed Gilani	108,755	25.17	
Independent	Devidas Teltumbde	21,389	4.95	
Independent	Ramesh Nanaji Jawade	6,517	1.51	
Independent	Govindrao Punjaji Buchke	5,396	1.24	
LKD	Dattatraya Damodar Linganwar	817	0.19	
Margin of victory		166,202	38.46	
Turnout		432,116	62.48	
INC gain from INC(I)		Swing		

=== General election 1980 ===
1980 Indian general election: Yavatmal
Party	Candidate	Votes	%	±%
INC	Uttamrao Patil	281,387	71.42	
INC(U)	Balasaheb Ghuikhedkar	81,207	20.61	
RPI(K)	Ramdas Gadpayale	14,028	3.56	
Independent	Ranjitsingh Chunnilalji Gondhale	4,314	1.10	
JP(S)	Badrinarayan Gopilal Changani	3,549	0.90	
Margin of victory		200,180	50.81	
Turnout		393,972	62.10	
INC gain from INC		Swing		

=== General election 1977 ===
1977 Indian general election: Yeotmal
Party	Candidate	Votes	%	±%
INC(R)	Shridharrao Jawade	192,228	49.23	
Independent	Nanasaheb Yembadwar	181,931	46.60	
Independent	Ramnarayan Ramgopal Chamedia	6,280	1.61	
Independent	Shriram Gunaji Pande	4,983	1.28	
Margin of victory		10,297	2.63	
Turnout		390,446	69.75	
INC(R) hold		Swing		

=== General election 1971 ===
1971 Indian general election: Yeotmal
Party	Candidate	Votes	%	±%
INC(R)	Sadashivrao Thakre	205,086	53.90	
AIFB	Jambuwantrao Dhote	170,048	44.69	
CPI	M Khurshidbhai	2,447	0.64	
PSP	Jainarayan Bhatrao Ahir	1,977	0.52	
Margin of victory		35,038	9.21	
Turnout		380,488	77.52	
INC(R) hold		Swing		

=== General election 1967 ===
1967 Indian general election: Yeotmal
Party	Candidate	Votes	%	±%
INC	Deorao Shioram Patil	167,416	47.61	
Independent	Jambuwantrao Dhote	153,768	43.72	
RPI	M. K. S. M. Ansari	21,279	6.05	
ABJS	D. B. Shirbhate	9,212	2.62	
Margin of victory		13,648	3.89	
Turnout		351,675	76.71	
INC hold		Swing		

=== General election 1962 ===
1962 Indian general election: Yeotmal
Party	Candidate	Votes	%	±%
INC	Deorao Shioram Patil	175,193	55.50	
Independent	Godhajirao Sakharam Mukhare	71,457	22.60	
RPI	Sakharam Hari Awachar	40,100	12.70	
Independent	Baliram Kolsu Agame	9,184	2.90	
Independent	Ramchandara Shridhar Mahajan	5,016	1.60	
Margin of victory		103,736	32.90	
Turnout		300,950	73.90	
INC hold		Swing		

=== General election 1957 ===
1957 Indian general election: Yeotmal
Party	Candidate	Votes	%	±%
INC	Dr. Deorao Yeshwantrao Gohokar	148,694	63.31	
ABJS	Narayan Dravid	86,166	36.69	
Margin of victory		62,528	26.62	
Turnout		234,860	66.63	
INC hold		Swing		

=== General election 1951 ===
1951 Indian general election: Yeotmal
Party	Candidate	Votes	%	±%
INC	Sahadeo Bharati	124,376	56.09	
Socialist	Ramnarayan Chemadia	54,887	24.75	
Independent	Mahadeo Kolhe	22,993	10.37	
Independent	Sanjabrao Dhote	19,501	8.79	
Margin of victory		69,489	31.34	
Turnout		221,757	55.87	
INC win		Swing		
