= Malegaon Lok Sabha constituency =

Former constituency of the Indian parliament in Maharashtra

Coordinates: 20.6°N 74.5°E

Malegaon
- Former Lok Sabha constituency

Constituency details
- Country: India
- Region: Western India
- State: Maharashtra
- Established: 1957
- Abolished: 2009
- Reservation: ST

Malegaon Lok Sabha constituency was one of the 48 Lok Sabha (parliamentary) constituencies of Maharashtra state in western India. Since 2009, It is merged and become part of Dhule Lok Sabha constituency

== Members of Parliament ==
Year	Member	Party
1952: Constituency did not exist
1957	Yadav Narain Jadhav	Praja Socialist Party
1962	Madhavrao Laxmanrao Jadhav	Indian National Congress
1967	Zamru Manglu Kahandole	Indian National Congress
1971	Zamru Manglu Kahandole	Indian National Congress
1977	Haribahu Shankar Mahale	Janata Party
1980	Zamru Manglu Kahandole	Indian National Congress
1984	Sitaram Sayaji Bhoye	Indian National Congress
1989	Haribahu Shankar Mahale	Janata Dal
1991	Zamru Manglu Kahandole	Indian National Congress
1996	Kacharu Bhau Raut	Bharatiya Janata Party
1998	Zamru Manglu Kahandole	Indian National Congress
1999	Haribahu Shankar Mahale	Janata Dal (Secular)
2004	Harischandra Devram Chavan	Bharatiya Janata Party
2008 Onwards : Constituency does not exist

== See also ==
- Malegaon
- Malegaon Central Assembly constituency
- Malegaon Outer Assembly constituency
- Dhule Lok Sabha constituency
- List of constituencies of the Lok Sabha
