= Anandrao Vithoba Adsul =

Indian politician

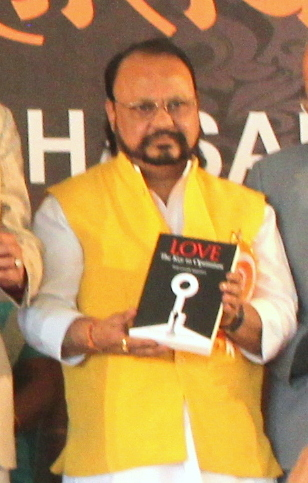
- Anandrao Vithoba Adsul in 2016

Member of Parliament, Lok Sabha
- In office 16 May 2009 – 23 May 2019
- Preceded by: Anant Gudhe
- Succeeded by: Navnit Ravi Rana
- Constituency: Amravati
- In office 10 May 1996 – 5 March 1998
- Preceded by: Mukul Wasnik
- Succeeded by: Mukul Wasnik
- Constituency: Buldhana
- In office 6 October 1999 – 16 May 2009
- Preceded by: Mukul Wasnik
- Succeeded by: Prataprao Jadhav
- Constituency: Buldhana

Leader of Shiv Sena Party
- In office January 2018 – May 2019

Union Minister of State for Finance and Company Affairs
- In office 26 August 2002 – 22 May 2004
- Prime Minister: Atal Bihari Vajpayee
- Preceded by: Anant Geete
- Succeeded by: S. S. Palanimanickam

Personal details
- Born: 1 June 1947 (age 79) At.Shirambe, Tq. Koregaon taluka Dist.Satara District
- Party: Shiv Sena
- Spouse: Mangala
- Children: 3
- Committees: Chairman, Standing Committee on Chemicals and Fertilizers (2014-)
- As of 16 September, 2006 Source: https://sansad.in/ls/members/biographyM/8?from=members

Anandrao Vithoba Adsul (born 1 June 1947) was a member of the 16th Lok Sabha of India. He represented the Amravati constituency of Maharashtra and is a member of the Shiv Sena (SS) political party. He had also represented the Amravati constituency in the 15th Lok Sabha and Buldhana constituency of Maharashtra in the 14th Lok Sabha, 13th Lok Sabha and 11th Lok Sabha.

He has been honored with Sansad Ratna Award in 2011, 2012 and 2013. In July 2022, he resigned from Shiv Sena as a leader of the party.

== Career ==
He served as a Member of Parliament of Lok Sabha from Amravati till 2019. He served as the Union Minister of State for Finance in Prime Minister Atal Bihari Vajpayee's cabinet till 2004. He was the chairperson of two corporations from 1995 to 1999 in the Shiv Sena-led government in Maharashtra.

Adsul contested the 2019 Lok Sabha election as a Shiv Sena candidate, and he lost the election by 30,000 votes to Navneet Kaur Rana, a former Telugu actress who contested the election as an independent candidate.

In October 2021, his name surfaced in the news in connection with an alleged ₹980-crore fraud at City Co-operative Bank, which is being investigated by the Enforcement Directorate (ED).

== Positions held ==
- 1996: Elected to 11th Lok Sabha (1st term)
- 1999: Re-elected to 13th Lok Sabha (2nd term)
- Oct. 1999-Jul. 2002: Chief Whip, Shiv Sena Parliamentary Party, Lok Sabha.
- 1999–2002: Member, Committee on Human Resource Development.
- 2000–2002: Member, Committee on Transport and Tourism.
- 2000-Mar. 2002: Member, Consultative Committee, Ministry of Railways.
- Jul. 2002-Aug. 2002: Leader, Shiv Sena Parliamentary Party
- 26 Aug. 2002 - May 2004: Union Minister of State, Ministry of Finance and Company Affairs.
- 2009 Re-elected to 15th Lok Sabha (4th term)
- 6 Aug. 2009 - Member, Committee on Public Accounts
- 31 Aug. 2009 - Member, Committee on Petroleum and Natural Gas
- 23 Sep. 2009 - Member, Committee on Government Assurances
- 5 May 2010 - Member, Committee on Public Accounts.
- 2014: Re-elected to 16th Lok Sabha (5th term)
- 1 Sep. 2014: Chairperson, Standing Committee on Chemicals and Fertilizers.
- 2018: Appointed Leader of Shiv Sena Party.
- 16 September 2024 appointed as chairman of Maharashtra Sc St Commission.
