= Erandol Lok Sabha constituency =

Former constituency of the Indian parliament in Maharashtra

Coordinates: 20.9°N 75.3°E

Erandol
- Former Lok Sabha constituency

Constituency details
- Country: India
- Region: Western India
- State: Maharashtra
- Established: 1977
- Abolished: 2009
- Reservation: None

Erandol Lok Sabha constituency was a Lok Sabha (parliamentary) constituency of Maharashtra state in western India. This constituency was dissolved when the "Delimitation of Parliamentary and Assembly Constituencies Order, 2008", based on the recommendations of the Delimitation Commission in 2002 was implemented in February 2008.

== Assembly segments ==
Erandol Lok Sabha constituency comprised the following six Vidhan Sabha segments:

1. Chalisgaon
2. Parola
3. Amalner
4. Chopda
5. Erandol
6. Pachora

== Members of Lok Sabha ==
Year	Member	Party
1952-77 : Constituency did not exist
1977	Sonusing Dhansing Patil	Janata Party
1980	Vijaykumar Naval Patil	Indian National Congress
1984	Vijaykumar Naval Patil	Indian National Congress
1989	Uttamrao Laxmanrao Patil	Bharatiya Janata Party
1991	Vijaykumar Naval Patil	Indian National Congress
1996	Annasaheb M. K. Patil	Bharatiya Janata Party
1998	Annasaheb M. K. Patil	Bharatiya Janata Party
1999	Annasaheb M. K. Patil	Bharatiya Janata Party
2004	Annasaheb M. K. Patil	Bharatiya Janata Party
2007^	Vasantrao More	Nationalist Congress Party
2008 onwards : seat does not exist

^ by-poll

== See also ==
- Raver Lok Sabha constituency
- List of former constituencies of the Lok Sabha
