= Aurangabad (disambiguation) =

Aurangabad, officially Chhatrapati Sambhajinagar, is a city in Maharashtra, India.

Aurangabad may also refer to these places in India named after Aurangzeb, the emperor of Mughal India:

== Places ==
=== Bihar ===
- Aurangabad, Bihar, a city
  - Aurangabad district, Bihar
  - Aurangabad, Bihar Assembly constituency
  - Aurangabad, Bihar Lok Sabha constituency

=== Haryana ===
- Aurangabad, Palwal

=== Maharashtra ===
- Aurangabad Cantonment
- Aurangabad CIDCO (City and Industrial Development Corporation)
- Aurangabad Industrial City
- Aurangabad district, Maharashtra
- Aurangabad division
- Aurangabad Airport
- Aurangabad Municipal Corporation
- Aurangabad railway station
- Aurangabad East Assembly constituency
- Aurangabad Central Assembly constituency
- Aurangabad West Assembly constituency
- Aurangabad, Maharashtra Lok Sabha constituency
- Roman Catholic Diocese of Aurangabad

=== Telangana ===
- Aurangabad, Medak, a village in Medak mandal

=== Uttar Pradesh ===
- Aurangabad Bangar, a census town in Mathura district
- Aurangabad, Barnahal, a village in Mainpuri district
- Aurangabad, Bulandshahr, a nagar panchayat in Bulandshahr district
- Aurangabad, Ghiror, a village in Mainpuri district

=== West Bengal ===
- Aurangabad, West Bengal, a census town in Murshidabad district
  - Aurangabad, West Bengal Assembly constituency, a former constituency

== See also ==
- Aurangabad district (disambiguation)
- Aurangabad Assembly constituency (disambiguation)
