= Aurangabad Assembly constituency =

Aurangabad Assembly constituency may refer to the following constituencies in India:

- Aurangabad, Bihar Assembly constituency
- Aurangabad, West Bengal Assembly constituency, former assembly constituency in West Bengal
- Aurangabad, Maharashtra Assembly constituency, former assembly constituency in Maharashtra

== See also ==
- Aurangabad (disambiguation)
- Aurangabad Central Assembly constituency, in Maharashtra
- Aurangabad West Assembly constituency, in Maharashtra
- Aurangabad East Assembly constituency, in Maharashtra
