= Aurangabad, Maharashtra Lok Sabha constituency =

Lok Sabha Constituency in Maharashtra, India

Coordinates: 19°53′19.63″N 75°20′36.37″E

Aurangabad MH-20
- Lok Sabha constituency
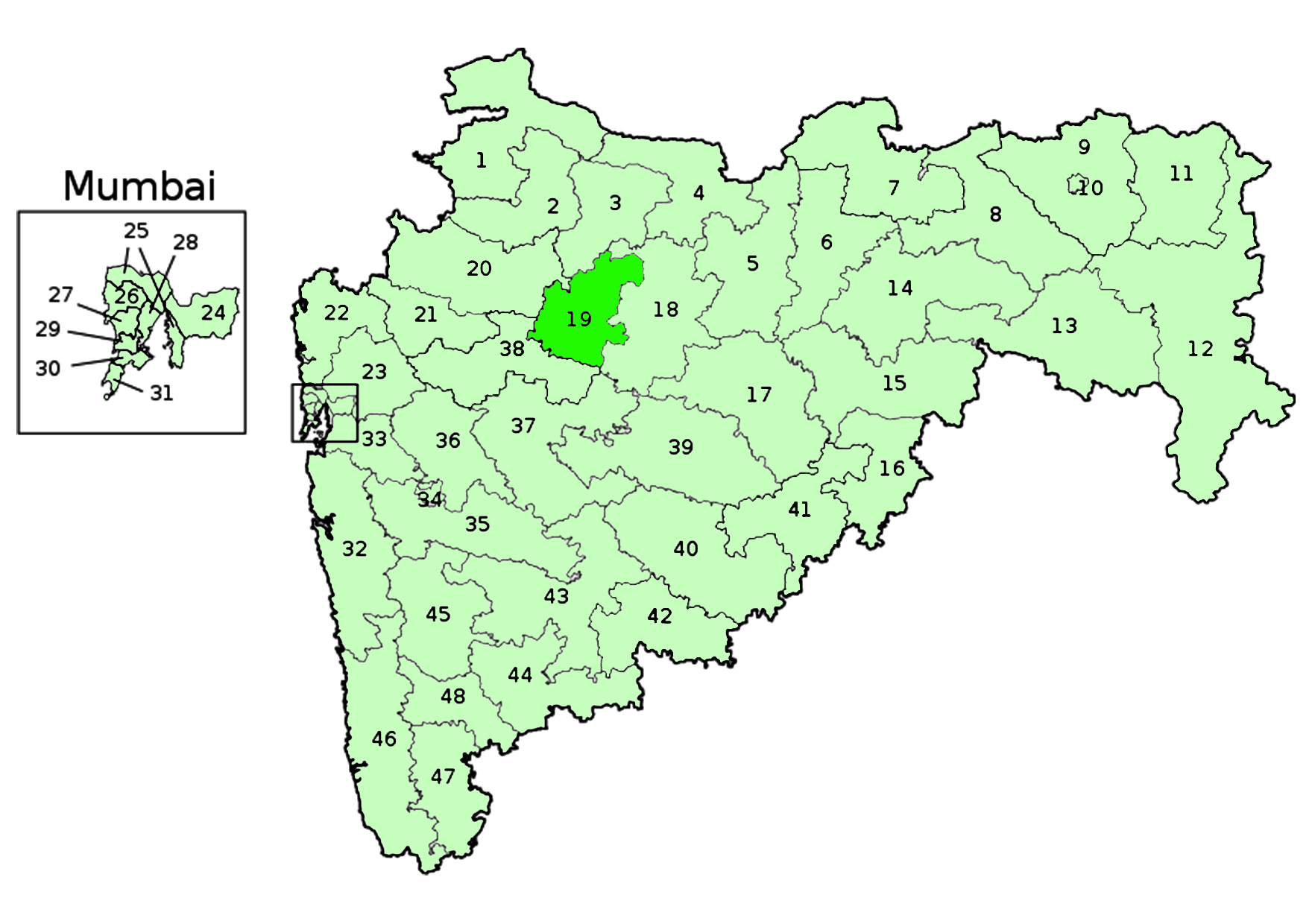
- Map of Aurangabad Lok Sabha constituency

Constituency details
- Country: India
- Region: Western India
- State: Maharashtra
- Assembly constituencies: Kannad; Aurangabad Central; Aurangabad West; Aurangabad East; Gangapur; Vaijapur
- Established: 1952
- Total electors: 20,59,710 (2024)
- Reservation: None

Member of Parliament
- 18th Lok Sabha
- Incumbent Sandipanrao Bhumre
- Party: SHS
- Alliance: NDA
- Elected year: 2024
- Preceded by: Syed Imtiyaz Jaleel

Aurangabad Lok Sabha constituency is one of the 48 Lok Sabha (parliamentary) constituencies in Maharashtra state in western India.

== Assembly Segments ==
Presently, Aurangabad Lok Sabha constituency comprises six Vidhan Sabha (legislative assembly) segments. These segments are:

#	Name	District	Member	Party	Leading (in 2024)
105	Kannad	Aurangabad	Sanjana Jadhav	SHS	SHS
107	Aurangabad Central	Aurangabad	Pradeep Jaiswal	SHS	AIMIM
108	Aurangabad West (SC)	Aurangabad	Sanjay Shirsat	SHS	SHS
109	Aurangabad East	Aurangabad	Atul Save	BJP	AIMIM
111	Gangapur	Aurangabad	Prashant Bamb	BJP	SHS
112	Vaijapur	Aurangabad	Ramesh Bornare	SHS	SHS

== Members of Parliament ==
Year	Name	Party
1952	Suresh Chandra	Indian National Congress
1957	Swami Ramanand Tirtha	Indian National Congress
1962	Bhaurao Deshmukh	Indian National Congress
1967	Bhaurao Deshmukh	Indian National Congress
1971	Manikrao Palodakar	Indian National Congress
1977	Bapu Kaldate	Janata Party
1980	Qazi Saleem	Indian National Congress
1984	Sahebrao Dongaonkar	Indian Congress (Socialist)
1989	Moreshwar Save	Shiv Sena
1991	Moreshwar Save	Shiv Sena
1996	Pradeep Jaiswal	Shiv Sena
1998	Ramkrishna Baba Patil	Indian National Congress
1999	Chandrakant Khaire	Shiv Sena
2004	Chandrakant Khaire	Shiv Sena
2009	Chandrakant Khaire	Shiv Sena
2014	Chandrakant Khaire	Shiv Sena
2019	Imtiaz Jaleel Syed	All India Majlis-e-Ittehadul Muslimeen
2024	Sandipanrao Bhumre	Shiv Sena

== Election results ==
=== General Elections 2024 ===
2024 Indian general elections: Aurangabad
Party	Candidate	Votes	%	±%
SHS	Sandipanrao Bhumre	476,130	36.56	▲4.47
AIMIM	Imtiaz Jaleel Syed	3,41,480	26.22	▼6.25
SS(UBT)	Chandrakant Khaire	2,93,450	22.53	New
VBA	Afsar Khan	69,266	5.32	▲5.32
Independent	Harshvardhan Jadhav	39,828	3.06	▼20.62
Independent	Surendra Digambar Gajbhare	10,725	0.82	N/A
BSP	Sanjay Uttamrao Jagtap	8,252	0.63	N/A
BYJEP	Ravindra Bhaskarrao Bodkhe	6,254	0.48	N/A
NOTA	None of the Above	5,773	0.44	N/A
Majority		1,34,650	10.34	▲9.96
Turnout		13,02,197	63.22	▼0.33
SHS gain from AIMIM		Swing		

=== General Elections 2019 ===
2019 Indian general elections: Aurangabad
Party	Candidate	Votes	%	±%
AIMIM	Imtiaz Jaleel Syed	389,042	32.47	▲32.47
SS	Chandrakant Khaire	3,84,550	32.09	▼20.90
IND	Harshvardhan Jadhav	2,83,798	23.68	▲23.68
INC	Subhash Zambad	91,790	7.66	▼28.85
Majority		4,492	0.38	▼16.10
Turnout		11,98,727	63.55	▲1.70
AIMIM gain from SS		Swing		

=== General Elections 2014 ===
2014 Indian general elections: Aurangabad
Party	Candidate	Votes	%	±%
SS	Chandrakant Khaire	520,902	52.99	▲17.99
INC	Nitin Suresh Patil	3,58,902	36.51	▲6.03
BSP	Jevrikar Indrakumar	37,419	3.81	▼0.65
AAP	Subahsh Lomte	11,974	1.22	N/A
Majority		1,62,000	16.48	▲11.96
Turnout		9,83,057	61.85	▲10.29
SS gain from INC		Swing	▲17.99	

=== General Elections 2009 ===
2009 Indian general elections: Aurangabad
Party	Candidate	Votes	%	±%
SS	Chandrakant Khaire	255,786	35.00	▼17.37
INC	Uttamsingh Pawar	2,22,882	30.48	▼8.53
Independent	Shantigiriji Maharaj	1,48,026	20.25	▲20.25
BSP	Salim Yusuf Sayyed	32,641	4.46	▲1.99
Majority		33,014	4.52	
Turnout		7,31,147	51.56	▼4.22
SS gain from INC		Swing		

=== General Elections 1980 ===
1980 Indian general election: Aurangabad
Party	Candidate	Votes	%	±%
INC	Qazi Saleem	169,723	50.91%	
INC(U)	Sahebrao Patil Dongaonkar	85,975	25.79%	
JP	T.S. Patil	53,281	15.98%	
RPI	Pradhan S. T.	11,557	3.47%	
Independent	Kishan Shripath	5,141	1.54%	
Independent	Dilawar Khan Abbas Khan	1,860	0.56%	
Independent	Kacharu Bajirao	1,486	0.45%	
Independent	Panditrao Narsuji Shinde	1,365	0.41%	
Independent	Shaikh Kasim Kismatwala S. Sajan	1,252	0.38%	
Majority		83,748	25.12%	
Turnout		333,227	64.75%	
INC gain from JP		Swing	{{{swing}}}	
