= Vaijapur Assembly constituency =

Constituency of the Maharashtra legislative assembly in India

Coordinates: 19.92°N 74.73°E

Vaijapur
- Constituency No. 112 for the Maharashtra Legislative Assembly

Constituency details
- Country: India
- Region: Western India
- State: Maharashtra
- Division: Aurangabad
- District: Aurangabad
- Lok Sabha constituency: Aurangabad
- Established: 1952
- Total electors: 320,856

Member of Legislative Assembly
- 15th Maharashtra Legislative Assembly
- Incumbent Ramesh Bornare
- Party: SHS
- Alliance: NDA
- Elected year: 2024
- Preceded by: Bhausaheb Patil Chikatgaonkar

Vaijapur Assembly constituency is one of the six constituencies of the Maharashtra Vidhan Sabha located in Aurangabad district.

It is a part of Aurangabad Lok Sabha constituency along with five other assembly constituencies, viz Kannad Assembly constituency, Gangapur, Maharashtra Assembly constituency, Aurangabad East Assembly constituency, Aurangabad Central Assembly constituency and Aurangabad West Assembly constituency.

== Members of the Legislative Assembly ==
Election	Member	Party
1952	Ashatai Waghamare	Indian National Congress
1957	Mahendranath Ramchandra	Praja Socialist Party
1962	Girjabai Machhindranath	Indian National Congress
1967	V. P. Patil	Indian National Congress
1972	Shakuntalabai Patil	Indian National Congress
1978	Uttamrao Keshavrao Patwari ( Bhalerao )	Janata Party
1980	Govindrao Adik	Indian National Congress
1985	Ramkrishna Baba Patil	Indian Congress
1990	Ramkrishna Baba Patil	Indian National Congress
1995	Kailas Ramrao Patil	Indian National Congress
1999	Rangnath Murlidhar Wani	Shiv Sena
2004	Rangnath Murlidhar Wani	Shiv Sena
2009	Rangnath Murlidhar Wani	Shiv Sena
2014	Bhausaheb Patil Chikatgaonkar	Nationalist Congress Party
2019	Ramesh Bornare Patil	Shiv Sena
2024	Ramesh Bornare Patil	Shiv Sena

== Election results ==
=== Assembly Election 2024 ===
2024 Maharashtra Legislative Assembly election : Vaijapur
Party	Candidate	Votes	%	±%
SS	Ramesh Bornare Patil	133,627	54.95	▲4.59
SS(UBT)	Dr. Dinesh Pardeshi	91,969	37.82	New
Independent	Ekanath Khanderao Jadhav	8,205	3.37	New
VBA	Kishor Bhimrao Jejurkar	5,495	2.26	▼3.02
NOTA	None of the above	1,723	0.71	▲0.21
Margin of victory		41,658	17.13	▼13.21
Turnout		244,898	76.33	▲12.98
Total valid votes		243,175		
Registered electors		320,856		▲3.45
SS hold		Swing	▲4.59	

=== Assembly Election 2019 ===
2019 Maharashtra Legislative Assembly election : Vaijapur
Party	Candidate	Votes	%	±%
SS	Ramesh Bornare Patil	98,183	50.36	▲25.11
NCP	Abhay Kailasrao Patil	39,020	20.01	▼7.69
Independent	Akil Gafur Shaikh	21,835	11.20	New
VBA	Pramod Shahadrao Nangare	10,297	5.28	New
Independent	Rajiv Babanrao Dongre	9,824	5.04	New
MNS	Santosh Jagannath Jadhav	7,224	3.71	▲0.62
Independent	Madhavrao Narharrao Paithane	1,564	0.80	New
Independent	Vishwas Bharat Patil	1,522	0.78	New
PHJSP	Dnyaneshwar Ghodke	1,449	0.74	New
NOTA	None of the above	970	0.50	▼0.13
Margin of victory		59,163	30.34	▲27.88
Turnout		196,486	63.35	▼6.89
Total valid votes		194,968		
Registered electors		310,142		▲12.83
SS gain from NCP		Swing	▲22.66	

=== Assembly Election 2014 ===
2014 Maharashtra Legislative Assembly election : Vaijapur
Party	Candidate	Votes	%	±%
NCP	Bhausaheb Patil Chikatgaonkar	53,114	27.70	New
SS	Rangnath Murlidhar Wani	48,405	25.25	▼5.23
INC	Dr. Dinesh Pardeshi	41,346	21.56	▼1.91
BJP	Ekanath Khanderao Jadhav	24,243	12.64	New
PWPI	Ramhari Karbhari Jadhav	12,648	6.60	New
MNS	Dangode Kalyan Dnyaneshwar	5,924	3.09	▲1.36
BSP	Babasaheb Bapurao Pagare	2,453	1.28	▼1.04
NOTA	None of the above	1,206	0.63	New
Margin of victory		4,709	2.46	▲1.73
Turnout		193,077	70.24	▲1.67
Total valid votes		191,734		
Registered electors		274,887		▲11.81
NCP gain from SS		Swing	▼2.78	

=== Assembly Election 2009 ===
2009 Maharashtra Legislative Assembly election : Vaijapur
Party	Candidate	Votes	%	±%
SS	Rangnath Murlidhar Wani	51,379	30.48	▲0.02
Independent	Bhausaheb Patil Chikatgaonkar	50,154	29.76	New
INC	Dr. Dinesh Pardeshi	39,557	23.47	▲6.13
Independent	Kailasrao Ramrao Patil alias Aaba	14,708	8.73	New
BSP	Pagare Prabhakar Thakaji	3,908	2.32	▼1.58
MNS	Sadaphal Prashant Dadasaheb	2,908	1.73	New
Independent	Sunil Asaram Gholap	2,540	1.51	New
RPI(A)	Tribhuvan Sanjay Dada	1,029	0.61	New
Margin of victory		1,225	0.73	▼5.86
Turnout		168,575	68.57	▼4.67
Total valid votes		168,539		
Registered electors		245,849		▲32.56
SS hold		Swing	▲0.02	

=== Assembly Election 2004 ===
2004 Maharashtra Legislative Assembly election : Vaijapur
Party	Candidate	Votes	%	±%
SS	Rangnath Murlidhar Wani	41,365	30.46	▼18.14
Independent	Bhausaheb Ramrao Chikatgaonkar	32,413	23.87	New
INC	Thombre Bhausaheb Rangnath	23,553	17.34	▼4.96
Independent	Sanjay Patil Nikamaliess Bhau (Tunkikar)	18,114	13.34	New
Independent	Jagannath Khanderao Jadhav	11,609	8.55	New
BSP	Bankar Narayan Somilal	5,292	3.90	New
BBM	Misal Arun Chandrakant	1,602	1.18	New
Independent	Wani Tukaram Sakhahari	1,005	0.74	New
Margin of victory		8,952	6.59	▼15.39
Turnout		135,843	73.24	▼0.46
Total valid votes		135,803		
Registered electors		185,469		▲21.09
SS hold		Swing	▼18.14	

=== Assembly Election 1999 ===
1999 Maharashtra Legislative Assembly election : Vaijapur
Party	Candidate	Votes	%	±%
SS	Rangnath Murlidhar Wani	51,234	48.60	▲30.63
NCP	Kailas Ramrao Patil	28,059	26.62	New
INC	Zambad Mansukh Manikchand	23,506	22.30	▼11.91
Independent	Katare Chadrakant Bala	1,929	1.83	New
Margin of victory		23,175	21.98	▲17.07
Turnout		112,878	73.70	▼3.44
Total valid votes		105,420		
Registered electors		153,162		▲2.61
SS gain from INC		Swing	▲14.39	

=== Assembly Election 1995 ===
1995 Maharashtra Legislative Assembly election : Vaijapur
Party	Candidate	Votes	%	±%
INC	Kailas Ramrao Patil	38,177	34.21	▼8.33
IC(S)	Rangnath Murlidhar Wani	32,695	29.30	New
SS	Katare Chadrakant Bala	20,051	17.97	▲5.10
Independent	Pawar Pandharinath Gangadhar	5,727	5.13	New
Independent	Kadam Gangadhar Parasram	2,258	2.02	New
Independent	Bhise Shekhar Laxmanrao	2,244	2.01	New
Independent	Nimbalkar Sarjerao Ramrao (Vakil)	1,889	1.69	New
Independent	Bainade Devsing Kisansing	1,725	1.55	New
Margin of victory		5,482	4.91	▼0.51
Turnout		115,142	77.14	▲9.13
Total valid votes		111,583		
Registered electors		149,262		▲4.65
INC hold		Swing	▼8.33	

=== Assembly Election 1990 ===
1990 Maharashtra Legislative Assembly election : Vaijapur
Party	Candidate	Votes	%	±%
INC	Ramkrishna Baba Patil	40,305	42.54	▼5.17
Independent	Kailas Ramrao Patil	35,165	37.11	New
SS	Chandrakant Katare	12,199	12.87	New
JD	Anandi Arvind Annadate	1,860	1.96	New
Independent	Pathade Suresh Bhaurao	1,363	1.44	New
Independent	Uttamrao Asaram Ingale (Mantri)	1,239	1.31	New
Margin of victory		5,140	5.42	▲2.35
Turnout		97,000	68.01	▲3.50
Total valid votes		94,757		
Registered electors		142,627		▲20.76
INC gain from IC(S)		Swing	▼8.24	

=== Assembly Election 1985 ===
1985 Maharashtra Legislative Assembly election : Vaijapur
Party	Candidate	Votes	%	±%
IC(S)	Ramkrishna Baba Patil	37,911	50.78	New
INC	Kailas Ramrao Patil	35,617	47.71	New
Independent	Ashok Murlidhar Ighe	767	1.03	New
Margin of victory		2,294	3.07	▼1.51
Turnout		76,197	64.51	▲6.59
Total valid votes		74,652		
Registered electors		118,109		▲7.66
IC(S) gain from INC(U)		Swing	▲0.48	

=== Assembly Election 1980 ===
1980 Maharashtra Legislative Assembly election : Vaijapur
Party	Candidate	Votes	%	±%
INC(U)	Govindrao Adik	31,090	50.30	New
INC(I)	Laxmanrao Bhagaji Bhise	28,260	45.72	▲27.49
Independent	Sarjerao Ramrao Nimbalkar	1,321	2.14	New
Independent	Tribhuvan Dilipkumar Chimaji	634	1.03	New
Margin of victory		2,830	4.58	▲3.45
Turnout		63,546	57.92	▲0.89
Total valid votes		61,813		
Registered electors		109,706		▲7.14
INC(U) gain from JP		Swing	▲16.02	

=== Assembly Election 1978 ===
1978 Maharashtra Legislative Assembly election : Vaijapur
Party	Candidate	Votes	%	±%
JP	Uttamrao Keshavrao Patwari ( Bhalerao )	19,376	34.28	New
INC	Balwantrao Alias Balasaheb Ramrao Pawar	18,740	33.16	▼52.92
INC(I)	Laxmanrao Bhagaji Bhise	10,305	18.23	New
Independent	R. K. Tribhuvan	4,022	7.12	New
PWPI	Sarjerao Ramrao Nimbalkar	1,572	2.78	New
Independent	Bhalchandra Radhuba Chavan	589	1.04	New
Independent	Ramphal Kedarsing Chindhale	452	0.80	New
Independent	Daulatram Kesharchand Sancheti	390	0.69	New
Margin of victory		636	1.13	▼71.02
Turnout		58,393	57.03	▲11.15
Total valid votes		56,521		
Registered electors		102,395		▲17.00
JP gain from INC		Swing	▼51.80	

=== Assembly Election 1972 ===
1972 Maharashtra Legislative Assembly election : Vaijapur
Party	Candidate	Votes	%	±%
INC	Shakuntalabai Patil	33,404	86.08	▲31.76
Independent	K. S. Misal	5,404	13.92	New
Margin of victory		28,000	72.15	▲51.08
Turnout		40,154	45.88	▼18.17
Total valid votes		38,808		
Registered electors		87,515		▲12.50
INC hold		Swing	▲31.76	

=== Assembly Election 1967 ===
1967 Maharashtra Legislative Assembly election : Vaijapur
Party	Candidate	Votes	%	±%
INC	V. P. Patil	25,024	54.32	▼10.82
Independent	K. Gangadhar	15,317	33.25	New
SSP	B. M. Patil	5,723	12.42	New
Margin of victory		9,707	21.07	▼14.93
Turnout		49,829	64.05	▲15.05
Total valid votes		46,064		
Registered electors		77,793		▼4.47
INC hold		Swing	▼10.82	

=== Assembly Election 1962 ===
1962 Maharashtra Legislative Assembly election : Vaijapur
Party	Candidate	Votes	%	±%
INC	Girjabai Machhindranath	23,830	65.14	▲18.56
PSP	Kishore Pawar Rameshwar Pawar	10,659	29.14	▼24.28
Independent	Khanderao Kachru	2,093	5.72	New
Margin of victory		13,171	36.00	▲29.16
Turnout		39,902	49.00	▲6.68
Total valid votes		36,582		
Registered electors		81,431		▲23.40
INC gain from PSP		Swing	▲11.72	

=== Assembly Election 1957 ===
1957 Bombay State Legislative Assembly election : Vaijapur
Party	Candidate	Votes	%	±%
PSP	Mahendranath Ramchandra	14,918	53.42	New
INC	Ashatai W/o Anandrao	13,007	46.58	▼9.63
Margin of victory		1,911	6.84	▼30.36
Turnout		27,925	42.32	▼6.17
Total valid votes		27,925		
Registered electors		65,988		▲27.89
PSP gain from INC		Swing	▼2.79	

=== Assembly Election 1952 ===
1952 Hyderabad State Legislative Assembly election : Vaijapur
Party	Candidate	Votes	%	±%
INC	Ashatai Waghamare	14,064	56.21	New
PDF	Lala Binda Prashad	4,757	19.01	New
SCF	Bhika Taraji	3,444	13.77	New
Socialist	Pandharinath Vithova	2,754	11.01	New
Margin of victory		9,307	37.20	
Turnout		25,019	48.49	
Total valid votes		25,019		
Registered electors		51,599		
INC win (new seat)				

== See also ==
Vaijapur
Kannad
