= Ministry of Housing (Maharashtra) =

Indian state ministry

Ministry of Housing Government of Maharashtra
- मंत्रालय गृहनिर्माण विभाग, महाराष्ट्र शासन
- Seal of the state of Maharashtra

- Building of Administrative Headquarters of Mumbai

Ministry overview
- Jurisdiction: (India) Maharashtra
- Headquarters: Mantralay, Mumbai
- Minister responsible: Eknath Shinde, Deputy Chief Minister and Minister of Housing
- Deputy Minister responsible: Pankaj Bhoyar, Minister of State
- Parent department: Government of Maharashtra
- Website: housing.maharashtra.gov.in/default.aspx

The Ministry of Housing is a ministry in the Government of Maharashtra. Ministry is responsible for implementation of laws and acts related to housing in Maharashtra.

The Ministry is headed by a cabinet level minister. Eknath Shinde is current Deputy Chief Minister and Minister of Housing.

== Head office ==
Minister of Housing मंत्री गृहनिर्माण विभाग
- Emblem of Maharashtra government

- Flag of India

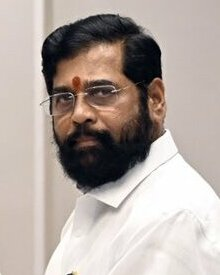
- Incumbent; Eknath Shinde (Deputy Chief Minister) 2024 since 21 December 2024
- Ministry of Housing (Maharashtra)
- Style: The Honourable
- Abbreviation: Cabinet Minister
- Member of: State Cabinet
- Reports to: Chief Minister, Maharashtra Legislature
- Seat: Mantralaya, Mumbai
- Appointer: Governor on the advice of the Chief Minister
- Term length: 5 years
- Precursor: Devendra Fadnavis Chief Minister; (2024- 2024)
- Inaugural holder: Homi J. H. Taleyarkhan; (1960-1962)
- Formation: 1 May 1960
- Deputy: Pankaj Rajesh Bhoyar

== Cabinet Ministers ==
No.	Portrait	Minister (Constituency)	Term of office			Political party	Ministry	Chief Minister
No.	Portrait	Minister (Constituency)	From	To	Period	Political party	Ministry	Chief Minister
Minister of Housing
01		Sultan. G. Kazi (MLC for Elected by Local Authorities Constituency No. 14 - Ahmednagar District) (Legislative Council)	01 May 1960	07 March 1962	1 year, 310 days	Indian National Congress	Yashwantrao I	Yashwantrao Chavan
02		Homi J. H. Taleyarkhan (MLC for Elected by MLAs Constituency No. 22 - Mumbai Suburban District) (Legislative Council)	08 March 1962	19 November 1962	256 days	Indian National Congress	Yashwantrao II	Yashwantrao Chavan
03		Homi J. H. Taleyarkhan (MLC for Elected by MLAs Constituency No. 22 - Mumbai Suburban District) (Legislative Council)	20 November 1962	24 November 1963	1 year, 4 days	Indian National Congress	Kannamwar l	Marotrao Kannamwar
04		P. K. Sawant (MLA for Chiplun Constituency No. 265- Ratnagiri District) (Legislative Assembly) (Interim Chief Minister)	25 November 1962	04 December 1963	9 days	Indian National Congress	Sawant I	P. K. Sawant
05		Homi J. H. Taleyarkhan (MLC for Elected by MLAs Constituency No. 22 - Mumbai Suburban District) (Legislative Council)	05 December 1963	01 March 1967	3 years, 86 days	Indian National Congress	Vasantrao I	Vasantrao Naik
06		D. S. Palaspagar (MLC for Elected by MLAs Constituency No. 19 - Bhandara District) (Legislative Council)	01 March 1967	27 October 1969	2 years, 240 days	Indian National Congress	Vasantrao II	Vasantrao Naik
07		Gopalrao Bajirao Khedkar (MLA for Akot Constituency No. 28- Akola District) (Legislative Assembly)	27 October 1969	13 March 1972	2 years, 138 days	Indian National Congress	Vasantrao II	Vasantrao Naik
08		Yashwantrao Mohite (MLA for Karad South Constituency No. 260- Satara District) (Legislative Assembly)	13 March 1972	04 April 1973	1 year, 32 days	Indian National Congress	Vasantrao III	Vasantrao Naik
09		Vasantrao Naik (MLA for Pusad Constituency No. 81- Yavatmal District) (Legislative Assembly) (Chief Minister)	04 April 1973	17 Match; 1974	347 days	Indian National Congress	Vasantrao III	Vasantrao Naik
10		Anant Namjoshi (MLA for Girgaon Constituency No. 185- Mumbai City District) (Legislative Assembly)	17 Match; 1974	21 February 1975	341 days	Indian National Congress	Vasantrao III	Vasantrao Naik
11		Abdul Rahman Antulay (MLA for Shrivardhan Constituency No. 193- Raigad District) (Legislative Assembly)	21 February 1975	13 September 1976	1 year, 205 days	Indian National Congress	Shankarrao I	Shankarrao Chavan
12		Pratibha Patil (MLA for Jalgaon City Constituency No. 13- Jalgaon District) (Legislative Assembly)	13 September 1976	17 May 1977	246 days	Indian National Congress	Shankarrao I	Shankarrao Chavan
13		Vasant Hoshing (MLA for Byculla Constituency No. 184- Mumbai City District (Legislative Assembly)	17 May 1977	07 March 1978	1 year, 294 days	Indian National Congress	Vasantdada I	Vasantdada Patil
14		Sudhakarrao Naik (MLA for Pusad Constituency No. 81- Yavatmal District) (Legislative Assembly)	07 March 1978	18 July 1978	133 days	Indian National Congress (U)	Vasantdada II	Vasantdada Patil
15		Jagannathrao Jadhav (MLA for Sangameshwar Constituency No. 173- Ratnagiri District (Legislative Assembly)	18 July 1978	17 February 1980	1 year, 214 days	Janata Party	Pawar I	Sharad Pawar
16		Pramilaben Yagnik (MLC for Governor Nominated No. 11 - Nagpur District) (Legislative Council)	09 June 1980	21 January 1982	1 year, 226 days	Indian National Congress	Antulay	Abdul Rahman Antulay
17		S. M. I. Aseer (MLA for Ahmednagar South Constituency No. 223- Ahmednagar District (Legislative Assembly)	21 January 1982	11 October 1982	263 days	Indian National Congress	Bhosale	Babasaheb Bhosale
18		Pratibha Patil (MLA for Jalgaon City Constituency No. 13- Jalgaon District) (Legislative Assembly)	11 October 1982	02 February 1983	114 days	Indian National Congress	Bhosale	Babasaheb Bhosale
19		Narendra Marutrao Kamble (MLC for Elected by Governor Nominated No. 10 - Mumbai City District) (Legislative Council)	07 February 1983	05 March 1985	2 years, 26 days	Indian National Congress	Vasantdada III	Vasantdada Patil
20		V. Subramanian (MLA for South Mumbai Constituency No. 121- Mumbai City District) (Legislative Assembly)	12 March 1985	03 June 1985	83 days	Indian National Congress	Vasantdada IV	Vasantdada Patil
21		V. Subramanian (MLA for South Mumbai Constituency No. 121- Mumbai City District) (Legislative Assembly)	03 June 1985	12 March 1986	282 days	Indian National Congress	Nilangekar	Shivajirao Patil Nilangekar
22		V. Subramanian (MLA for South Mumbai Constituency No. 121- Mumbai City District) (Legislative Assembly)	12 March 1986	26 June 1988	2 years, 106 days	Indian National Congress	Shankarrao II	Shankarrao Chavan
23		W. R. Sherekar (MLC for Elected by MLAs Constituency No. 22 - Chandrapur District) (Legislative Council)	26 June 1988	03 March 1990	1 year, 250 days	Indian National Congress	Pawar II	Sharad Pawar
24		Javed Iqbal Khan (MLA for Trombay Constituency No. 177- Mumbai Suburban District) (Legislative Assembly)	04 March 1990	25 June 1991	1 year, 113 days	Indian National Congress	Pawar III	Sharad Pawar
25		Javed Iqbal Khan (MLA for Trombay Constituency No. 177- Mumbai Suburban District) (Legislative Assembly)	25 June 1991	22 February 1993	1 year, 242 days	Indian National Congress	Sudhakarrao	Sudhakarrao Naik
26		Chhagan Bhujbal (MLA for Mazgaon constituency No. 210- Mumbai Suburban District) (Legislative Assembly)	06 March 1993	14 March 1995	2 years, 8 days	Indian National Congress	Pawar IV	Sharad Pawar
27		Chandrakant Khaire (MLA for Aurangabad West Constituency No. 108- Chhatrapati Sambhaji Nagar District Also Previously Known Aurangabad District (Legislative Assembly)	14 March 1995	09 June 1997	2 years, 87 days	Shiv Sena	Joshi	Manohar Joshi
28		Manohar Joshi (MLA for Dadar Constituency No. 181- Mumbai City District) (Legislative Assembly) (Chief Minister)	09 June 1997	31 January 1999	1 year, 236 days	Shiv Sena	Joshi	Manohar Joshi
29		Anna Dange (MLC for Elected by MLAs Constituency No. 05 - Sangli District) (Legislative Council)	01 February 1999	11 May 1999	99 days	Bharatiya Janata Party	Rane	Narayan Rane
30		Sabir Shaikh (MLA for Ambarnath Constituency No. 140- Thane District) (Legislative Assembly)	11 May 1999	17 October 1999	159 days	Shiv Sena	Rane	Narayan Rane
31		Rohidas Patil (MLA for Dhule Constituency No. 07- Dhule District (Legislative Assembly)	19 October 1999	16 January 2003	3 years, 88 days	Indian National Congress	Deshmukh I	Vilasrao Deshmukh
32		Satish Chaturvedi (MLA for Nagpur East Constituency No. 54- Nagpur district) (Legislative Assembly)	18 January 2003	01 November 2004	1 year, 295 days	Indian National Congress	Sushilkumar	Sushilkumar Shinde
31		Vilasrao Deshmukh (MLA for Latur City Constituency No. 235- Latur District) (Legislative Assembly) (Chief Minister)	09 November 2004	01 December 2007	4 years, 22 days	Indian National Congress	Deshmukh II	Vilasrao Deshmukh
32		Ashok Chavan (MLA for Bhokar Constituency No. 85- Nanded District) (Legislative Assembly) (Chief Minister)	08 December 2008	06 November 2009	333 days	Indian National Congress	Ashok I	Ashok Chavan
33		Ashok Chavan (MLA for Bhokar Constituency No. 85- Nanded District) (Legislative Assembly) (Chief Minister)	07 November 2009	10 November; 201p	1 year, 3 days	Indian National Congress	Ashok II	Ashok Chavan
34		Prithviraj Chavan (MLC for Elected by MLAs Constituency No. 19 - Satara District) (Legislative Council) (Chief Minister)	11 November 2010	26 September 2014	3 years, 319 days	Indian National Congress	Prithviraj	Prithviraj Chavan
35		Prakash Mehta (MLA for Ghatkopar East Constituency No. 170- Mumbai Suburban District (Legislative Assembly)	31 October 2014	16 June 2019	4 years, 228 days	Bharatiya Janata Party	Fadnavis I	Devendra Fadnavis
36		Radhakrishna Vikhe Patil (MLA for Shirdi Constituency No. 218- Ahmednagar District) (Legislative Assembly)	16 June 2019	12 November 2019	149 days	Bharatiya Janata Party	Fadnavis I	Devendra Fadnavis
37		Devendra Fadnavis (MLA for Nagpur South West Constituency No. 52- Nagpur District) (Legislative Assembly) (Chief Minister) (In Charge)	23 November 2019	28 November 2019	5 days	Bharatiya Janata Party	Fadnavis II	Devendra Fadnavis
38		Jayant Patil (MLA for Islampur Constituency No. 283- Sangli District) (Legislative Assembly)	28 November 2019	30 December 2019	32 days	Nationalist Congress Party	Thackeray	Uddhav Thackeray
39		Jitendra Awhad (MLA for Mumbra-Kalwa Constituency No. 149- Thane District (Legislative Assembly)	30 December 2019	29 June 2022	2 years, 181 days	Nationalist Congress Party	Thackeray	Uddhav Thackeray
40		Eknath Shinde (MLA for Kopri-Pachpakhadi Constituency No. 147- Thane District) (Legislative Assembly) (Chief Minister) (In Charge)	30 June 2022	14 August 2022	45 days	Shiv Sena (2022–present)	Eknath	Eknath Shinde
41		Devendra Fadnavis (MLA for Nagpur South West Constituency No. 52- Nagpur District) (Legislative Assembly) (Deputy Chief Minister)	14 August 2022	14 July 2023	334 days	Bharatiya Janata Party	Eknath	Eknath Shinde
42		Atul Save (MLA for Aurangabad East Constituency No. 109- Chhatrapati Sambhaji Nagar District Also Previously Known Aurangabad District (Legislative Assembly)	14 July 2023	26 November 2024	1 year, 135 days	Bharatiya Janata Party	Eknath	Eknath Shinde
43		Devendra Fadnavis (MLA for Nagpur South West Constituency No. 52- Nagpur District) (Legislative Assembly) (Chief_Minister); In Charge	05 December 2024	21 December 2024	16 days	Bharatiya Janata Party	Fadnavis III	Devendra Fadnavis
44		Eknath Shinde (MLA for Kopri-Pachpakhadi Constituency No. 147- Thane District) (Legislative Assembly) (Deputy Chief Minister)	21 December 2024	Incumbent	1 year, 261 days	Shiv Sena (2022–present)	Fadnavis III	Devendra Fadnavis

== Ministers of State ==
No.	Portrait	Deputy Minister (Constituency)	Term of office			Political party	Ministry	Minister	Chief Minister
No.	Portrait	Deputy Minister (Constituency)	From	To	Period	Political party	Ministry	Minister	Chief Minister
Deputy Minister of Housing
Vacant			23 November 2019	28 November 2019	5 days	NA	Fadnavis II	Devendra Fadnavis	Devendra Fadnavis
01		Satej Patil (MLC for Elected by Kolhapur Local Authorities Constituency No. 06 - Kolhapur District) (Legislative Council)	30 December 2019	29 June 2022	2 years, 181 days	Indian National Congress	Thackeray	Jitendra Awhad	Uddhav Thackeray
Vacant			30 June 2022	26 November 2024	2 years, 149 days	NA	Eknath	Eknath Shinde (2022 - 2022); Devendra Fadnavis (2022 - 2023); Atul Save (2023 - 2024)	Eknath Shinde
02		Pankaj Rajesh Bhoyar (MLA for Wardha Constituency No. 47- Wardha District) (Legislative Assembly)	21 December 2024	incumbent	1 year, 261 days	Bharatiya Janata Party	Fadnavis III	Eknath Shinde	Devendra Fadnavis

== List of principal secretary ==
Valsa Nair Singh (IAS 1991), previously Principal Secretary Tourism, Civil Aviation and State Excise, was appointed Additional Chief Secretary of the Housing Department on 30 September 2022.

== Maharashtra Housing & Area Development Authority (MHADA) ==
MHADA is a statutory housing authority and a nodal agency under Ministry of Housing, Government of Maharashtra.

The Maharashtra Housing & Area Development Authority (MHADA) was established by the Maharashtra Housing and Area Development Act, 1976. It came into existence on 5 December 1977. The erstwhile Mumbai Housing and Area Development Board was restructured by a Government Resolution dated 5.11.1992 and split into three separate Boards viz. Mumbai Housing and Area Development Board, Mumbai Building Repairs and Reconstruction Board and Mumbai Slum Improvement Board Under the Government Resolution No. 2679/B, dated 22.7.1992. At present MHADA is coordinating and controlling the activities of seven regional housing boards, setup for each revenue division in the state viz. Mumbai, Konkan, Pune, Nashik, Nagpur, Amravati, Aurangabad and two special purpose boards viz. Mumbai Building Repairs and Reconstruction Board and Mumbai Slum Improvement Board. In Mumbai, it has constructed about 3 lakh housing units.

== Slum Rehabilitation Authority (SRA) ==
Slum Rehabilitation Authority (SRA) was established by the Maharashtra Government in 1995. SRA acts under Maharashtra Slum Areas (Improvement, Clearance and Redevelopment) Act, 1971. Authority mainly looks after rehabilitation of slum dwellers in the Mumbai region.

== Maharashtra Housing Development Corporation(MHDC/MahaHousing) ==
Maharashtra Housing Development Corporation (MahaHousing) was registered in 2019 under Indian Companies Act 2013. Maharashtra Government runs affordable housing schemes under MahaHousing with the help of Government of India. It is part of the Pradhan Mantri Awas Yojana under which government provides an interest subsidy.
