= Manikrao Palodakar =

Indian politician

Member of Parliament, Lok Sabha
- In office 1971–1977
- Preceded by: Bhaurao Dagadurao Deshmukh
- Succeeded by: Bapu Kaldate
- Constituency: Aurangabad

Personal details
- Party: Indian National Congress
- Spouse: Sojabai Manikarao Palodakar
- Parent: Sandu Patil (father)

Manikrao Palodakar is an Indian politician, elected to the Lok Sabha, the lower house of the Parliament of India as a member of the Indian National Congress.
