= Khaire =

Khaire is a surname. Notable people with the surname include:

- Chandrakant Khaire (born 1952), Indian parliamentarian
- Hassan Ali Khaire (born 1968), former prime minister of Somalia
