= Dahegaon =

Dahegaon may refer to:

- Dahegaon, Maharashtra, a village in Aurangabad district, Maharashtra
- Dahegaon, Komaram Bheem, a village in Komaram Bheem district, Telangana
