= Rajendra Darda =

Indian politician

Rajendra Jawaharlal Darda
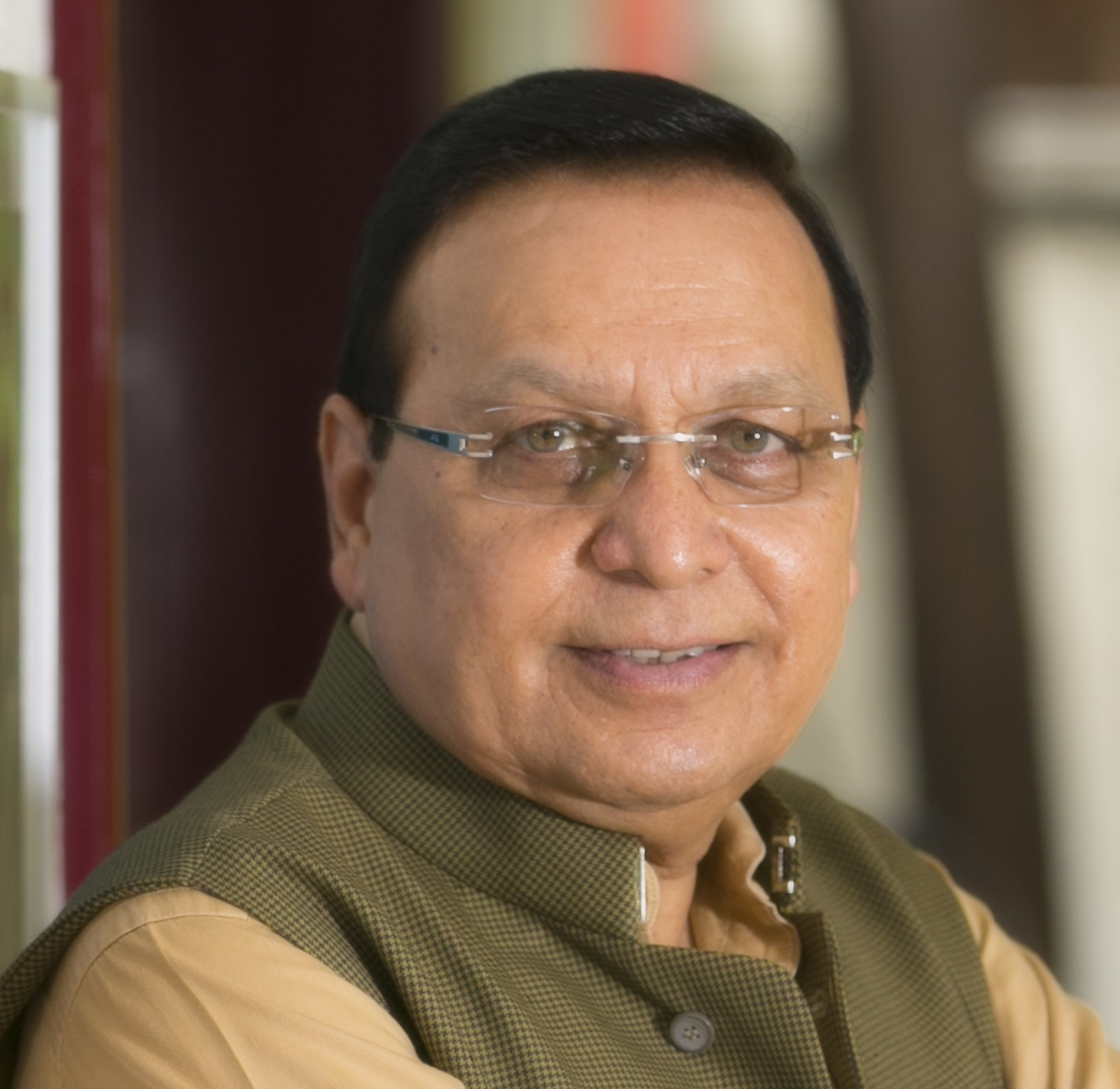

Member of Maharashtra Legislative Assembly
- In office (1999-2004), (2004 – 2009)
- Preceded by: Chandrakant Khaire
- Succeeded by: Sanjay Shirsat
- Constituency: Aurangabad West
- In office (2009–2014)
- Preceded by: Dr.Kalyan Kale
- Succeeded by: Atul Save
- Constituency: Aurangabad East

Personal details
- Born: 21 November 1952 (age 73) Yavatmal, Maharashtra
- Party: Indian National Congress
- Spouse: Ashoo R. Darda
- Children: 2 sons (Karan & Rishi)
- Parent(s): Jawaharlal Darda, Veenadevi J. Darda
- Relatives: Vijay Darda (Brother)
- Occupation: Journalist, Businessman
- Website: www.rajendradarda.com

Rajendra Jawaharlal Darda is the editor-in-chief of Lokmat Media Group, a well-known author and social worker. He was a three-time Member of the Maharashtra Legislative Assembly from Aurangabad, Maharashtra. He was a Cabinet Minister for Education and Minister of Industries in the government of Maharashtra.

== Education ==
After graduating from Nagpur University, Darda received his diploma from the Government Institute of Printing Technology, Mumbai. Darda also attended a two-year advanced course in Graphic Arts from the London College of Printing.

== Career ==
Darda is editor-in-chief of the Lokmat newspaper group. Darda had also taught journalism courses at Nagpur University.

== Art and literature ==
Rajendra Darda published his first Marathi book "Zumbar", a travelogue narrating his experiences as a student in Europe and America in the 1970s. He has also penned a book "Vibrant Vignettes" in English. In the book "Aamche Vidyapeeth" eminent journalists threw light on his contribution to journalism. He has authored a number of articles on a variety of issues and personalities. He is an expert in graphic arts and has completed two-year Advanced Course in Graphic Arts from London College of Printing.

== Ministerial tenures ==
- 31 October 1999 – Minister of State for Energy and Tourism (Chief Minister Mr Vilasrao Deshmukh)
- 9 March 2001 – Minister of State for Energy, Finance and Planning (Chief Minister Mr Vilasrao Deshmukh)
- 27 January 2003 – Minister of State for Home (Urban) (Chief Minister Mr Sushilkumar Shinde)
- 12 July 2004 – Minister of State for Energy and Excise (Chief Minister Mr Sushilkumar Shinde)
- 8 November 2009 – Cabinet Minister for Industries, Employment, Self-employment (Chief Minister Mr Ashok Chavan)
- 19 November 2010 – Cabinet Minister for School Education (Chief Minister Mr Prithviraj Chavan)

== Awards and recognition ==
- 16 September 1984: Rajendra Darda selected for Best Jaycees Yavatmal Cotton City award.
- 31 January 1986 – Lokmat Editor Rajendra Darda honoured by Maharashtra Jaycees for being Outstanding Young Person.
- 10 May 1992: Lokmat Times Editor Rajendra Darda received Matrusri Award from Former President of India Giani Zail Singh for Lokmat Times (Best Regional English Newspaper).
- 24 December 1993: Giants Federation International president Nana Chudasama felicitated Rajendra Darda for the good work in newspaper industry during the 19th convention of the Giants International.
- 29 September 1996: Rajendra Darda received Shakahar Shiromani award of Shri Bhagwan Medical Foundation from former Union Minister and champion of vegetarianism and animal welfare Maneka Gandhi.
- 14 February 2000: Rajendra Darda received 'Acharya Atre Award' from renowned cartoonist R K Laxman at Ambejogai, Beed.
- 3 October 2007: Prime Minister Dr Manmohan Singh presented Indian Language Newspaper Association’s (ILNA) award to Rajendra Darda for high standards in journalism and his contribution in national development.
- 28 June 2008: Rajendra Darda received Late Suvalalji Wakekar award at Parli Vaijnath in Beed.
- 10 February 2009: Rajendra Darda honoured with Veer Ratna award by Mahavir International to mark completion of its decade of work.
- 29 June 2009: Rajendra Darda, MLA awarded the Best Orator in the Legislative Assembly (Maharashtra) award by the then President of India, Pratibhatai Patil.
- 21 March 2010: Association of Business Communicators felicitated Industry Minister Rajendra Darda with Excellence in Strategic Business Communication award. • 30 March 2018: Sakal Jain Samaj president Rajendra Dada felicitated with ‘Bahubali Award.’
- 29 July 2022: Mahabodhi International Meditation Centre, Leh, Ladakh honoured Lokmat Editor-in-Chief Rajendra Darda with Goodwill Ambassador certificate.
- The World Record of Excellence Award (England) for journey in journalism, politics & social causes over the past five decades.

== Social service ==
Mr. Darda has always been committed to the cause of social justice, health and environment. In 1984, he mobilized relief funds for the flood-affected people of Nanded and Parbhani and constructed school buildings. After the severe earthquakes of Bihar (1988) and Killari (Latur, Marathwada 1993), he made a significant contribution through Lokmat Relief Fund towards giving relief to the affected people. Under his leadership, the Lokmat Group of Newspapers raised Kargil relief fund for the families of the martyrs and constructed hostels for the children of the martyrs at Aurangabad, Nagpur, Latur and Solapur.

=== Politics ===
In 1999, he was elected a Member of the Legislative Assembly (MLA) from Aurangabad Assembly Constituency, Maharashtra. Darda became the Minister of State for Energy, Finance and Planning, and later the Minister of State for Home. He was re-elected MLA from Aurangabad (West) Constituency in 2004 and Aurangabad (East) Constituency in 2009. He became the Minister for Industries in the newly constituted Cabinet of Maharashtra Government in November 2009 and later served as the School Education Minister.

== Personal life ==
Darda has two sons Karan and Rishi, and a brother Vijay Jawaharlal Darda who is Chairman of Lokmat and has served 3 times as an MP. He is married to Ashoo Darda, who is the chairperson of Lokmat Sakhi Manch.
