= Bhausaheb Patil Chikatgaonkar =

Indian politician

Maharashtra Legislative Assembly
- In office 2014–2019
- Preceded by: Rangnath Wani
- Succeeded by: Ramesh Bornare
- Constituency: Vaijapur

Personal details
- Born: 4 April 1961 (age 65) Chikatgaon, Vaijapur Taluka, Aurangabad District
- Party: Shiv Sena
- Other political affiliations: Nationalist Congress Party
- Spouse(s): Vijaya Chikatgaonkar, Ex-President, ZP-Aurangabad
- Children: 2
- Occupation: Politician
- Profession: Politician

Bhausaheb Patil Chikatgaonkar is an Indian politician and District President of the Nationalist Congress Party. Bhausaheb Patil Chikatgaonkar won the Vaijapur constituency of Maharashtra in the Assembly Election 2014.

== Terms in office ==
Bhausaheb Patil Chikatgaonkar is a first term member in the Maharashtra Legislative Assembly MLA.
