= Aurangabad West Assembly constituency =

Constituency of the Maharashtra legislative assembly in India

Coordinates: 19.84°N 75.23°E

Aurangabad West
- Constituency No. 108 for the Maharashtra Legislative Assembly

Constituency details
- Country: India
- Region: Western India
- State: Maharashtra
- Division: Aurangabad
- District: Aurangabad
- Lok Sabha constituency: Aurangabad
- Established: 1967
- Total electors: 407,238
- Reservation: SC

Member of Legislative Assembly
- 15th Maharashtra Legislative Assembly
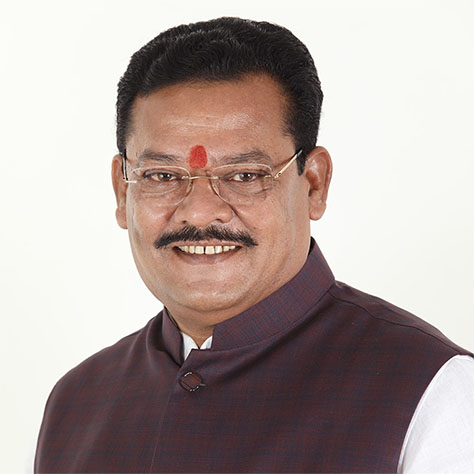
- Incumbent Sanjay Shirsat
- Party: SHS
- Alliance: NDA
- Elected year: 2024

Aurangabad West Assembly constituency (officially Chhatrapati Sambhajinagar West Assembly constituency) is one of the six constituencies of Maharashtra Vidhan Sabha located in Aurangabad district. It is reserved for the Scheduled Castes (SC) from 2008.

It is a part of the Aurangabad (Lok Sabha constituency) along with five other assembly constituencies, viz Vaijapur Assembly constituency, Gangapur, Maharashtra Assembly constituency, Aurangabad East Assembly constituency, Kannad Assembly constituency and Aurangabad Central Assembly constituency

== Members of Legislative Assembly ==
Year	Member	Party
1967	Rafiq Zakaria	Indian National Congress
1972	Rafiq Zakaria	Indian National Congress
1978	Abdul Azim Abdul Hameed	Indian National Congress
1980	Abdul Azim Abdul Hameed	Indian National Congress
1985	Amanulla Motiawala	Indian Congress
1990	Chandrakant Khaire	Shiv Sena
1995	Chandrakant Khaire	Shiv Sena
1999	Rajendra Darda	Indian National Congress
2004	Rajendra Darda	Indian National Congress
2009	Sanjay Shirsat	Shiv Sena
2014	Sanjay Shirsat	Shiv Sena
2019	Sanjay Shirsat	Shiv Sena
2024	Sanjay Shirsat	Shiv Sena

== Election results ==
=== Assembly Election 2024 ===
2024 Maharashtra Legislative Assembly election : Aurangabad West
Party	Candidate	Votes	%	±%
SHS	Sanjay Shirsat	122,498	49.62%	▲6.94
SS(UBT)	Raju Shinde	1,06,147	43.00%	New
VBA	Anjan Salve	9,667	3.92%	▼9.15
Republican Party of India (Democratic)	Ramesh Gaikwad	2,440	0.99%	New
NOTA	None of the Above	1,703	0.69%	▼0.93
Margin of victory		16,351	6.62%	▼13.98
Turnout		2,48,582	61.04%	▲2.19
Total valid votes		2,46,879		
Registered electors		4,07,238		▲21.19
SHS hold		Swing	▲6.94	

=== Assembly Election 2019 ===
2019 Maharashtra Legislative Assembly election : Aurangabad West
Party	Candidate	Votes	%	±%
SS	Sanjay Shirsat	83,792	42.68%	▲9.49
BJP	Raju Ramrao Shinde	43,347	22.08%	New
AIMIM	Arun Vitthlrao Borde	39,336	20.03%	New
VBA	Sandeep Bhausaheb Shirsat	25,649	13.06%	New
NOTA	None of the Above	3,187	1.62%	▲1.01
Margin of victory		40,445	20.60%	▲16.85
Turnout		1,99,789	59.46%	▼5.75
Total valid votes		1,96,340		
Registered electors		3,36,024		▲16.78
SS hold		Swing	▲9.49	

=== Assembly Election 2014 ===
2014 Maharashtra Legislative Assembly election : Aurangabad West
Party	Candidate	Votes	%	±%
SS	Sanjay Shirsat	61,282	33.18%	▼15.22
BJP	Madhukar Damodhar Sawant	54,355	29.43%	New
Panthers Republican Party	Gangadhar Sukhdevrao Gade	35,348	19.14%	New
INC	Dr. Jitendra Ankushrao Dehade	14,798	8.01%	▼28.54
NCP	Milind Yashwantrao Dabhade	5,198	2.81%	New
BSP	Dabhade Sugandh Sitaram	4,399	2.38%	▲0.71
BMP	Jayprakash Shankarrao Narnavre	1,871	1.01%	New
NOTA	None of the Above	1,131	0.61%	New
Margin of victory		6,927	3.75%	▼8.11
Turnout		1,85,980	64.63%	▲13.99
Total valid votes		1,84,679		
Registered electors		2,87,750		▲20.53
SS hold		Swing	▼15.22	

=== Assembly Election 2009 ===
2009 Maharashtra Legislative Assembly election : Aurangabad West
Party	Candidate	Votes	%	±%
SS	Sanjay Shirsat	58,008	48.41%	▲4.90
INC	Parkhe Chandrabhan Banduji	43,797	36.55%	▼9.31
BBM	Amit Sudhakar Bhuigal	3,791	3.16%	▲2.33
Independent	Kailas Asaram Bakhare	3,269	2.73%	New
RPI(A)	Prashant Pritamkumar Shegaonkar	2,791	2.33%	New
BSP	Rajkundal Jaya Balu	2,009	1.68%	▼6.02
ABS	Dilip Sudam Sutar	1,421	1.19%	New
Margin of victory		14,211	11.86%	▲9.51
Turnout		1,19,850	50.20%	▼9.59
Total valid votes		1,19,833		
Registered electors		2,38,747		▼57.52
SS gain from INC		Swing	▲2.55	

=== Assembly Election 2004 ===
2004 Maharashtra Legislative Assembly election : Aurangabad West
Party	Candidate	Votes	%	±%
INC	Rajendra Darda	154,056	45.86%	▼6.78
SS	Pradeep Jaiswal	1,46,170	43.51%	▲8.67
BSP	Kamaal Farooqui	25,859	7.70%	▲7.39
BBM	Kharat Gautam Bhagaji	2,796	0.83%	New
Independent	Syed M. Sultan M. Vajir	2,525	0.75%	New
Margin of victory		7,886	2.35%	▼15.45
Turnout		3,36,036	59.80%	▲1.06
Total valid votes		3,35,960		
Registered electors		5,61,956		▲31.03
INC hold		Swing	▼6.78	

=== Assembly Election 1999 ===
1999 Maharashtra Legislative Assembly election : Aurangabad West
Party	Candidate	Votes	%	±%
INC	Rajendra Darda	132,568	52.64%	▲26.79
SS	Barwal Gajanan Ramkisan	87,732	34.83%	▼10.24
NCP	Madhukarrao Mule (Anna)	27,029	10.73%	New
JD(S)	Ajmal Khan Afzal Khan	1,549	0.62%	New
Margin of victory		44,836	17.80%	▼1.42
Turnout		2,59,342	60.47%	▼6.74
Total valid votes		2,51,861		
Registered electors		4,28,871		▼0.11
INC gain from SS		Swing	▲7.56	

=== Assembly Election 1995 ===
1995 Maharashtra Legislative Assembly election : Aurangabad West
Party	Candidate	Votes	%	±%
SS	Chandrakant Khaire	126,700	45.08%	▲0.71
INC	Rajendra Darda	72,657	25.85%	New
Independent	Jawed Hussain Khan	42,722	15.20%	New
Independent	Gadhe Gangadhar Sukhdeorao	15,450	5.50%	New
BSP	Babamastan	4,787	1.70%	New
JD	Prof. Pradip Dube	4,491	1.60%	▼1.49
BBM	Kale Ganpat Rangnathrao	3,128	1.11%	New
Margin of victory		54,043	19.23%	▲4.69
Turnout		2,85,435	66.48%	▲7.19
Total valid votes		2,81,083		
Registered electors		4,29,326		▲24.79
SS hold		Swing	▲0.71	

=== Assembly Election 1990 ===
1990 Maharashtra Legislative Assembly election : Aurangabad West
Party	Candidate	Votes	%	±%
SS	Chandrakant Khaire	88,964	44.37%	New
Independent	Jawed Hussain Khan	59,809	29.83%	New
BRP	Ratankumar Pandagale	16,756	8.36%	New
Independent	Gangadhar Gade	15,218	7.59%	New
JD	Jafar Nakshabandi	6,186	3.09%	New
Independent	Farzan Ardeshar (Baba)	6,090	3.04%	New
Independent	Abdul Azim Abdul Hameed	1,349	0.67%	New
Margin of victory		29,155	14.54%	▲14.18
Turnout		2,02,294	58.80%	▲7.75
Total valid votes		2,00,507		
Registered electors		3,44,032		▲62.19
SS gain from IC(S)		Swing	▲5.90	

=== Assembly Election 1985 ===
1985 Maharashtra Legislative Assembly election : Aurangabad West
Party	Candidate	Votes	%	±%
IC(S)	Amanulla Motiawala	41,235	38.47%	New
INC	S. T. Pradhan	40,849	38.11%	New
Independent	Patel Shabbir khan	10,899	10.17%	New
Independent	S. M. Kulkarni	7,293	6.80%	New
Independent	Jagannath Kashinath Kamble	2,697	2.52%	New
CPI	Taksal Manohar Pandharinath	1,566	1.46%	New
Independent	Nelson Ingles Harrison	1,155	1.08%	New
Margin of victory		386	0.36%	▼8.58
Turnout		1,08,815	51.30%	▼1.61
Total valid votes		1,07,180		
Registered electors		2,12,111		▲37.24
IC(S) gain from INC(I)		Swing	▲4.60	

=== Assembly Election 1980 ===
1980 Maharashtra Legislative Assembly election : Aurangabad West
Party	Candidate	Votes	%	±%
INC(I)	Abdul Azim Hameed	27,302	33.88%	▼17.03
INC(U)	Amanullah Motiwala	20,096	24.94%	New
BJP	Basaiyye Shaligram Rajaram	17,738	22.01%	New
Independent	Gangadhar Gade	14,655	18.18%	New
JP	Raosaheb Chavan Patil	800	0.99%	▼31.46
Margin of victory		7,206	8.94%	▼9.51
Turnout		82,098	53.12%	▼9.50
Total valid votes		80,591		
Registered electors		1,54,553		▲13.54
INC(I) hold		Swing	▼17.03	

=== Assembly Election 1978 ===
1978 Maharashtra Legislative Assembly election : Aurangabad West
Party	Candidate	Votes	%	±%
INC(I)	Abdul Azim Hameed	42,716	50.90%	New
JP	Kashinath Navander	27,230	32.45%	New
INC	H. P. Nath	4,692	5.59%	▼50.20
Independent	Ramanlal Parikh	2,019	2.41%	New
Independent	More Balasaheb Shivram	1,908	2.27%	New
Independent	Kismatwala Sheikh Kasim	1,754	2.09%	New
Independent	Pritamkumar Sampatrao Shegaonkar	1,683	2.01%	New
Margin of victory		15,486	18.45%	▼15.81
Turnout		85,867	63.08%	▲4.71
Total valid votes		83,916		
Registered electors		1,36,124		▲31.97
INC(I) gain from INC		Swing	▼4.89	

=== Assembly Election 1972 ===
1972 Maharashtra Legislative Assembly election : Aurangabad West
Party	Candidate	Votes	%	±%
INC	Rafiq Zakaria	32,761	55.79%	▼3.85
RPI	ST Pradhan	12,641	21.53%	▲0.29
ABJS	Dnyanendra Sharma	10,790	18.37%	▼0.76
Independent	Razni Umra Hussain	1,531	2.61%	New
Margin of victory		20,120	34.26%	▼4.14
Turnout		60,398	58.56%	▼1.16
Total valid votes		58,723		
Registered electors		1,03,144		▲30.97
INC hold		Swing	▼3.85	

=== Assembly Election 1967 ===
1967 Maharashtra Legislative Assembly election : Aurangabad West
Party	Candidate	Votes	%	±%
INC	Rafiq Zakaria	27,282	59.64%	New
RPI	R. D. Aurangabadkar	9,713	21.23%	New
ABJS	V. H. Deshpandey	8,753	19.13%	New
Margin of victory		17,569	38.40%	
Turnout		48,265	61.29%	
Total valid votes		45,748		
Registered electors		78,751		
INC win (new seat)				
