= Aurangabad district =

Aurangabad district may refer to these districts in India:

- Aurangabad district, Bihar
- Aurangabad district, Maharashtra

== See also ==
- Aurangabad (disambiguation)
