= Rangnath Wani =

Indian politician

Rangnath Murlidhar Wani- R.M. WANI

Member of Legislative Assembly of Maharashtra
- In office 1999–2014
- Preceded by: Kailash Ramrao Patil
- Succeeded by: Bhausaheb Patil
- Constituency: Vaijapur

Personal details
- Born: 4 January 1944
- Died: 1 September 2021 (aged 77)
- Party: Shiv Sena

Rangnath Murlidhar Wani was an Indian politician and member of the Shiv Sena. He was elected to Maharashtra Legislative Assembly for three consecutive terms from 1999 to 2014 from the Vaijapur Vidhan Sabha constituency in Aurangabad district, Maharashtra.

== Positions held ==
- 1999: Elected to Maharashtra Legislative Assembly
- 2004: Re-Elected to Maharashtra Legislative Assembly
- 2009: Re-Elected to Maharashtra Legislative Assembly
