= Qazi Saleem =

Indian politician and Urdu poet (1930-2005)

Member of Parliament, Lok Sabha
- In office 1980-1984
- Preceded by: Bapu Kaldate
- Succeeded by: Sahebrao Dongaonkar
- Constituency: Aurangabad

Personal details
- Born: 27 November 1930 Saleem Manzil, Manzoorpura, Aurangabad, Nizam State of Hyderabad (currently Maharashtra)
- Died: 8 May 2005 (aged 74)
- Party: Indian National Congress
- Spouse: Maqbool Bano (04 May 1953)
- Children: 1 Daughter
- Parent: Qazi Hamiduddin (father)
- Education: B.A., LL.B.
- Alma mater: Aligarh Muslim University and Osmania University, Hyderabad.
- Profession: Advocate and Businessman

Qazi Saleem (27 November 1930 - 8 May 2005) was an Indian politician and Indian Urdu poet. He served as Member of Parliament, Lok Sabha, the lower house of the Parliament of India as a member of the Indian National Congress.

== Early life and background ==
Qazi Saleem was born on 27 November 1930 in Aurangabad village of Aurangabad District. Qazi Hamiduddin was his father. He completed his education from Aligarh Muslim University and Osmania University, Hyderabad.

== Personal life ==
Qazi Saleem married Maqbool Bano on 4 May 1953 and the couple has one daughter.

== Political career ==
Qazi Saleem was associated with Shetkari Kamgar Paksh, Maharashtra and served as District Secretary of Shetkari Kamgar Paksh from 1955 to 1962. In 1962 he joined Indian National Congress and became the founder and president of Aurangabad District Congress (I). He also served as a Member of the Maharashtra Legislative Council from 1962 to 1972. Later he served as Member of Parliament in 7th Lok Sabha from Aurangabad.

== Positions held ==
- District Secretary, Shetkari Kamgar Paksh (1955 - 1962).
- Vice-President, Marathwada Vibhag Congress (I).
- General Secretary of Azad College.
- Secretary of Sampardayikta Virodhi Samiti, Aurangabad.
- Member of Maharashtra Legislative Council (1962 - 1972).

#	From	To	Position Held
1	1955	1962	District Secretary of Shetkari Kamgar Paksh.
2	1962	1972	Member of Maharashtra Legislative Council.
3	18 Jan 1980	31 Dec 1984	MP in 7th Lok Sabha from Aurangabad.
