= Aurangabad Central Assembly constituency =

Constituency of the Maharashtra legislative assembly in India

Coordinates: 19.868°N 75.310°E

Aurangabad Central
- Constituency No. 107 for the Maharashtra Legislative Assembly
- Constituency in Red - Aurangabad District Map

Constituency details
- Country: India
- Region: Western India
- State: Maharashtra
- Division: Aurangabad
- District: Aurangabad
- Lok Sabha constituency: Aurangabad LS
- Established: 2008
- Total electors: 369,066
- Reservation: None

Member of Legislative Assembly
- 15th Maharashtra Legislative Assembly
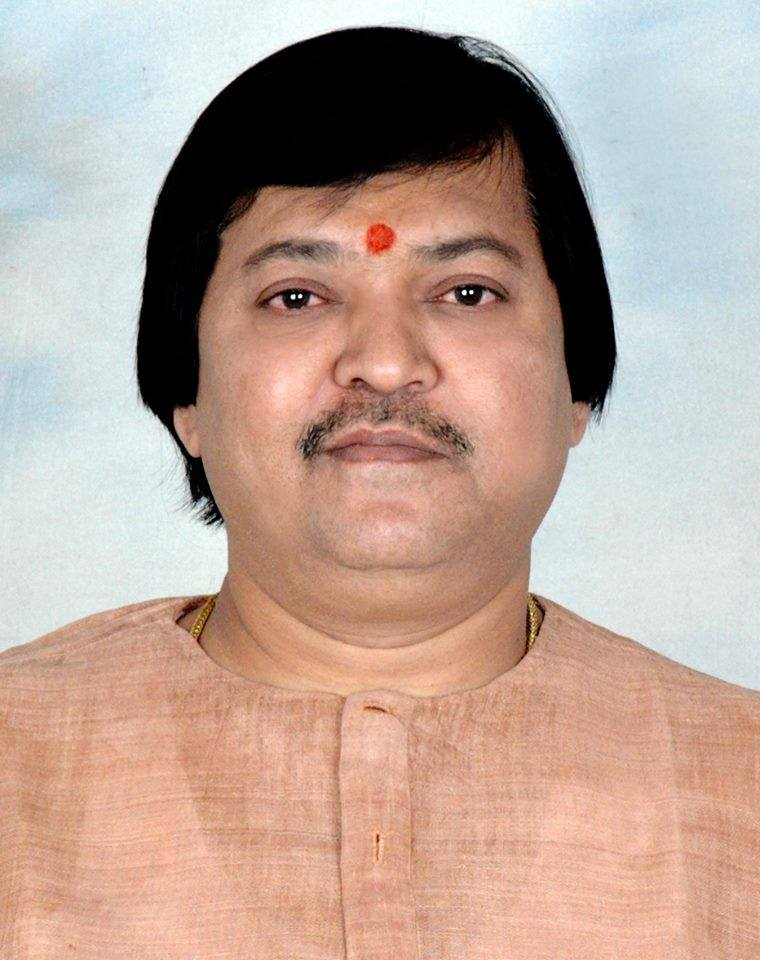
- Incumbent Pradeep Jaiswal
- Party: SHS
- Alliance: NDA
- Elected year: 2024

Aurangabad Central Assembly constituency (officially known as Chhatrapati Sambhajingar Central Assembly constituency) is one of the six constituencies of Maharashtra Vidhan Sabha located in Aurangabad district, Maharashtra.

It is a part of the Aurangabad (Lok Sabha constituency) along with five other assembly constituencies, Vaijapur, Gangapur, Aurangabad East, Kannad and Aurangabad West (SC).

== Members of the Legislative Assembly ==
Year	Member	Party
Until 2008: Constituency did not exist
2009	Pradeep Jaiswal	Independent
2014	Imtiaz Jaleel Syed	All India Majlis-e-Ittehadul Muslimeen
2019	Pradeep Jaiswal	Shiv Sena
2024	Pradeep Jaiswal	Shiv Sena

== Election results ==
=== Assembly Election 2024 ===
2024 Maharashtra Legislative Assembly election : Aurangabad Central
Party	Candidate	Votes	%	±%
SS	Pradeep Jaiswal	85,459	38.73	▼3.83
AIMIM	Naseruddin Siddiqui	77,340	35.05	▼0.32
SS(UBT)	Balasaheb Thorat	37,098	16.81	New
VBA	Jaweed Qureshi	12,639	5.73	▼8.41
NOTA	None of the Above	938	0.43	▼0.28
Margin of victory		8,119	3.68	▼3.51
Turnout		2,21,576	60.04	▲0.50
Total valid votes		2,20,638		
Registered electors		3,69,066		▲13.27
SS hold		Swing	▼3.83	

=== Assembly Election 2019 ===
2019 Maharashtra Legislative Assembly election : Aurangabad Central
Party	Candidate	Votes	%	±%
SS	Pradeep Jaiswal	82,217	42.57	▲20.26
AIMIM	Naseeruddin Siddiqui	68,325	35.37	▲2.41
VBA	Amit Bhuigal	27,302	14.13	New
NCP	Abdul Qadeer Mulana	7,290	3.77	▼2.54
Independent	Kirti Shinde	2,987	1.55	New
NOTA	None of the Above	1,365	0.71	▲0.26
Margin of victory		13,892	7.19	▼3.46
Turnout		1,94,764	59.77	▼6.10
Total valid votes		1,93,155		
Registered electors		3,25,835		▲13.54
SS gain from AIMIM		Swing	▲9.61	

=== Assembly Election 2014 ===
2014 Maharashtra Legislative Assembly election : Aurangabad Central
Party	Candidate	Votes	%	±%
AIMIM	Imtiyaz Jaleel	61,843	32.96	New
SS	Pradeep Jaiswal	41,861	22.31	▼2.70
BJP	Kishanchand Tanwani	40,770	21.73	New
NCP	Vinod Patil	11,842	6.31	▼24.28
BSP	Sanjay Jagtap	11,048	5.89	▲3.56
NOTA	None of the Above	833	0.44	New
Margin of victory		19,982	10.65	▲4.48
Turnout		1,88,728	65.76	▲11.13
Total valid votes		1,87,636		
Registered electors		2,86,978		▲14.55
AIMIM gain from Independent		Swing	▼3.80	

=== Assembly Election 2009 ===
2009 Maharashtra Legislative Assembly election : Aurangabad Central
Party	Candidate	Votes	%	±%
Independent	Pradeep Jaiswal	49,965	36.76	New
NCP	Abdul Qadeer Maulana	41,581	30.59	New
SS	Vikas Jain	33,988	25.01	New
BSP	Sanjay Chavan	3,162	2.33	New
Margin of victory		8,384	6.17	
Turnout		1,35,941	54.26	
Total valid votes		1,35,917		
Registered electors		2,50,536		
Independent win (new seat)				
