= Atul Save =

Indian politician

Minister of Renewable Energy Government of Maharashtra
- Incumbent
- Assumed office 15 December 2024
- Chief Minister: Devendra Fadnavis
- Preceded by: Ministry created

Minister of Dairy Development Government of Maharashtra
- Incumbent
- Assumed office 15 December 2024
- Chief Minister: Devendra Fadnavis
- Preceded by: Radhakrishna Vikhe Patil

Minister of OBC Welfare Government of Maharashtra
- Incumbent
- Assumed office 9 August 2022
- Chief Minister: Eknath Shinde; Devendra Fadnavis
- Preceded by: Vijay Wadettiwar

Minister of Housing Government of Maharashtra
- In office 2 July 2023 – 26 November 2024
- Chief Minister: Eknath Shinde
- Preceded by: Devendra Fadnavis
- Succeeded by: Eknath Shinde

Minister of Co-operation Government of Maharashtra
- In office 9 August 2022 – 2 July 2023
- Chief Minister: Eknath Shinde
- Preceded by: Shamrao Patil
- Succeeded by: Dilip Walse Patil

Minister of state Government of Maharashtra
- In office 16 June 2019 – 8 November 2019
- Chief Minister: Devendra Fadnavis
- Minister: Subhash Desai
- Department: Industry & Mining

Member of Maharashtra Legislative Assembly
- Incumbent
- Assumed office 2014
- Preceded by: Rajendra Darda
- Constituency: Aurangabad East

Personal details
- Born: 26 February 1962 (age 64) Nanded, Maharashtra, India
- Party: Bharatiya Janata Party
- Parent: Moreshwar Save (father)
- Education: Bachelor of Commerce
- Occupation: Politician

Atul Moreshwar Save is an Indian politician and member of the Bharatiya Janata Party. Save was elected to the Maharashtra Legislative Assembly from the Chh. Sambhajinagar Assembly Constituency of in the 2014 Elections.

The Bharatiya Janata Party chose him to lead the party in the Aurangabad Municipal Corporation elections. In the 2024 Maharashtra Assembly Election, Save was elected as the MLA of the BJP from Chh. Sambhajinagar (Aurangabad) East, Maharashtra, defeating AIMIM's Mr. Imtiaz Jalil.

== Positions held ==
=== Ministerial ===
Portfolio	Tenure	
Minister of Co-operation earlier now Minister of Housing Development	9-Aug-2022	present
Minister of OBC Welfare	9-Aug-2022	present
Minister of state for Industry & Mining	16-Jun-2019	8-Nov-2019

=== Legislative ===
Office	Constituency	Tenure	
Member of Maharashtra Legislative Assembly	Aurangabad East	2024	Present
Member of Maharashtra Legislative Assembly	Aurangabad East	2019	2024
Member of Maharashtra Legislative Assembly	Aurangabad East	2014	2019
