= Bapu Kaldate =

Indian politician

Member of Parliament, Rajya Sabha
- In office 1984–1996
- Constituency: Maharashtra

Member of Parliament, Lok Sabha
- In office 1977–1980
- Preceded by: Manikrao Palodakar
- Succeeded by: Qazi Saleem
- Constituency: Aurangabad, Maharashtra

Personal details
- Born: 1 December 1929 Isthal, Bombay Presidency, British India
- Died: 17 November 2011 (aged 81)
- Party: Janata Dal
- Spouse: Sudha Kaldate
- Children: 2 daughters

Bapu Kaldate (1 December 1929 – 17 November 2011) was an Indian politician. He was elected to the Lok Sabha, the lower house of Indian Parliament, in 1977 from Aurangabad in Maharashtra. He was earlier elected to Maharashtra Legislative Assembly. He was a member of the Rajya Sabha the upper house of Indian Parliament, representing Maharashtra for two terms from 1984 to 1996 as member of the Janata Dal. He refused to defect from his party and turned down an offer of a cabinet berth from Chandrasekhar.

== Electoral History ==
=== Rajya Sabha ===
Position	Party	Constituency	From	To	Tenure
Member of Parliament, Rajya Sabha (1st Term)	JD	Maharashtra	3 April 1984	2 April 1990	5 years, 364 days
Member of Parliament, Rajya Sabha (2nd Term)	JD	Maharashtra	3 April 1990	2 April 1996	5 years, 365 days
