= Ramkrishna Baba Patil =

Indian politician (1936–2020)

MLA, Maharashtra Legislative Assembly
- In office (1985-1990), (1990-1995)
- Preceded by: Govindrao Adik, (Indian National Congress)
- Succeeded by: Kailash Ramrao Patil, (Indian National Congress)
- Constituency: Vaijapur

Member of Parliament, Lok Sabha
- In office (1998–1999)
- Preceded by: Pradeep Jaiswal (Shiv Sena)
- Succeeded by: Chandrakant Khaire (Shiv Sena)
- Constituency: Aurangabad

Personal details
- Born: Ramkrishna Jagannath Patil; 2 September 1936 Dahegaon, Aurangabad, Hyderabad State, India
- Died: 2 September 2020 (aged 84) Aurangabad
- Spouse: Ashra Bai (m. 1956)
- Children: 4 (two sons and two daughters)
- Profession: Agriculturist; Social worker

Ramkrishna Jagannath Patil, popularly known as Ramkrishna Baba (2 September 1936 – 2 September 2020) was an Indian politician. He was a member of the Indian National Congress political party from Aurangabad, Maharashtra.

== Political career ==
Patil was a two time member of Maharashtra Legislative Assembly from Vaijapur between 1985 and 1995. He was elected to the 12th Lok Sabha in 1998 from the Aurangabad (Maharashtra Lok Sabha constituency).

He was also an agriculturist and bank chairman by profession besides being a politician and social worker. He served as the chairman of District Central Cooperative Bank in Aurangabad for 25 consecutive years.

== Personal life ==
Patil was born on 2 September 1936 in Dahegaon near Aurangabad. He completed his education until matriculation.

He died of diabetic complications due to old age in Aurangabad on 2 September 2020 at the age of 84. He was cremated in Dahegaon.

== Positions held ==
- 1978-1980 Chairman, Panchayat Samiti, Vaijapur, Aurangabad
- 1985-1995: Member, Maharashtra Legislative Assembly (two terms)
- 1998: Elected to 12th Lok Sabha
- 1998-99: Member, Committee on Agriculture
  Member, Consultative Committee, Ministry of Finance

== See also ==
- Vaijapur (Vidhan Sabha constituency)
- Aurangabad (Maharashtra Lok Sabha constituency)
- 12th Lok Sabha
- List of members of the 12th Lok Sabha
