= Moreshwar Save =

Indian politician

Member of Parliament, Lok Sabha
- In office (1989-1991), (1991 – 1996)
- Preceded by: Sahebrao Dongaonkar
- Succeeded by: Pradeep Jaiswal
- Constituency: Aurangabad

Mayor of Aurangabad
- In office 5 July 1989 – 19 May 1990
- Preceded by: Shantaram Kale
- Succeeded by: Pradeep Jaiswal

Personal details
- Born: 14 February 1931 Chinchani, Thane District, Bombay Presidency
- Died: 16 July 2015 (aged 84) Aurangabad, Maharashtra
- Party: Shiv Sena
- Spouse: Leelawati (m. 1952, his death 2015)
- Children: 3 sons (incl. Atul Save); 1 daughter
- Education: Osmania University

Moreshwar Dinanath Save (1931 – 16 July 2015) was an Indian politician who was a leader of Shiv Sena and a member of the Lok Sabha elected from Aurangabad. He was member of the 9th and 10th Lok Sabha. He also served as mayor of Aurangabad in 1989–1990.
