= Sahebrao Dongaonkar =

Indian politician

Member of Parliament, Lok Sabha
- In office 1984-1989
- Preceded by: Qazi Saleem
- Succeeded by: Moreshwar Save
- Constituency: Aurangabad

Personal details
- Born: 6 June 1948
- Party: Indian National Congress
- Spouse: Indumati
- Children: Krishna Sahebrao Dongaonkar

Sahebrao Patil Dongaonkar is an Indian politician, elected to the Lok Sabha, the lower house of the Parliament of India as a member of the Indian National Congress.
