= Aurangabad East Assembly constituency =

Aurangabad Constituency of the Maharashtra legislative assembly in India

Coordinates: 19.87°N 75.33°E

Aurangabad East
- Constituency No. 109 for the Maharashtra Legislative Assembly

Constituency details
- Country: India
- Region: Western India
- State: Maharashtra
- Division: Aurangabad
- District: Aurangabad (CS Nagar)
- Lok Sabha constituency: Aurangabad
- Total electors: 354,686

Member of Legislative Assembly
- 15th Maharashtra Legislative Assembly
- Incumbent Atul Save
- Party: BJP
- Elected year: 2024

Aurangabad East Assembly constituency is one of the six constituencies of Maharashtra Vidhan Sabha located in Aurangabad district, Maharashtra.

It is a part of Aurangabad (Lok Sabha constituency) along with five other assembly constituencies viz Vaijapur, Gangapur, Aurangabad Central, Kannad and Aurangabad West (SC)

== Members of the Legislative Assembly ==
| Year | Member | Party |
|---|---|---|
| 1978 | Rambhau Gawande | Janata Party |
| 1980 | Keshavrao Autade | Indian National Congress (I) |
| 1985 | Haribhau Bagade | Bharatiya Janata Party |
| 1990 | Haribhau Bagade | Bharatiya Janata Party |
| 1995 | Haribhau Bagade | Bharatiya Janata Party |
| 1999 | Haribhau Bagade | Bharatiya Janata Party |
| 2004 | Kalyan Kale | Indian National Congress |
| 2009 | Rajendra Darda | Indian National Congress |
| 2014 | Atul Save | Bharatiya Janata Party |
| 2019 | Atul Save | Bharatiya Janata Party |
| 2024 | Atul Save | Bharatiya Janata Party |

== Election results ==
=== Assembly Election 2024 ===
2024 Maharashtra Legislative Assembly election : Aurangabad East
| Party | Candidate | Votes | % | ±% |
|---|---|---|---|---|
| BJP | Atul Save | 93,274 | 43.32 | ▼5.26 |
| AIMIM | Imtiyaz Jaleel | 91,113 | 42.32 | ▲0.94 |
| INC | Lahu Shewale | 12,568 | 5.84 | New |
| VBA | Afsar Khan | 6,507 | 3.02 | New |
| SP | Dr.Abdul Gaffar Quadri | 5,943 | 2.76 | ▼0.11 |
| NOTA | None of the Above | 1,289 | 0.60 | ▼0.41 |
| Margin of victory | | 2,161 | 1.00 | ▼6.20 |
| Turnout | | 2,16,580 | 61.06 | ▲0.11 |
| Total valid votes | | 2,15,291 | | |
| Registered electors | | 3,54,686 | | ▲11.11 |
| BJP hold | | Swing | ▼5.26 | |

=== Assembly Election 2019 ===
2019 Maharashtra Legislative Assembly election : Aurangabad East
| Party | Candidate | Votes | % | ±% |
|---|---|---|---|---|
| BJP | Atul Save | 93,966 | 48.59 | ▲11.64 |
| AIMIM | Dr.Abdul Gaffar Quadri | 80,036 | 41.38 | ▲6.87 |
| SP | Kaleem Chotu Quraishi | 5,555 | 2.87 | New |
| BSP | Kishor Vishvanath Mhaske | 3,970 | 2.05 | ▼1.02 |
| MBT | Isa Yaseen | 2,395 | 1.24 | New |
| NOTA | None of the Above | 1,953 | 1.01 | ▲0.56 |
| Margin of victory | | 13,930 | 7.20 | ▲4.76 |
| Turnout | | 1,95,456 | 61.23 | ▼6.10 |
| Total valid votes | | 1,93,394 | | |
| Registered electors | | 3,19,209 | | ▲21.89 |
| BJP hold | | Swing | ▲11.64 | |

=== Assembly Election 2014 ===
2014 Maharashtra Legislative Assembly election : Aurangabad East
| Party | Candidate | Votes | % | ±% |
|---|---|---|---|---|
| BJP | Atul Save | 64,528 | 36.95 | ▲10.58 |
| AIMIM | Dr.Abdul Gaffar Quadri | 60,268 | 34.51 | New |
| INC | Rajendra Darda | 21,203 | 12.14 | ▼26.40 |
| SS | Kala Oza | 11,409 | 6.53 | New |
| BSP | Kacharu Shripat Sonawane | 5,364 | 3.07 | ▲1.71 |
| Independent | Uttamsingh Rajdharsingh Pawar | 2,885 | 1.65 | New |
| NCP | Zuber Amanullah Motiwala | 2,121 | 1.21 | New |
| NOTA | None of the Above | 786 | 0.45 | New |
| Margin of victory | | 4,260 | 2.44 | ▼9.74 |
| Turnout | | 1,75,429 | 66.99 | ▲13.88 |
| Total valid votes | | 1,74,636 | | |
| Registered electors | | 2,61,887 | | ▲10.61 |
| BJP gain from INC | | Swing | ▼1.60 | |

=== Assembly Election 2009 ===
2009 Maharashtra Legislative Assembly election : Aurangabad East
| Party | Candidate | Votes | % | ±% |
|---|---|---|---|---|
| INC | Rajendra Darda | 48,190 | 38.55 | ▼9.65 |
| BJP | Karad Dr. Bhagwat Kisanrao | 32,965 | 26.37 | ▼17.32 |
| Independent | Zambad Subhash Manakchand | 17,276 | 13.82 | New |
| Independent | Ma. Javed Mo. Isak | 12,571 | 10.06 | New |
| Independent | Kashinath Haribahu Kokate | 4,858 | 3.89 | New |
| MNS | Prof. Parshuram Chandrabhan Vakhure | 2,256 | 1.80 | New |
| BSP | Thombare Balu Nathaji | 1,701 | 1.36 | ▼0.53 |
| Margin of victory | | 15,225 | 12.18 | ▲7.66 |
| Turnout | | 1,25,040 | 52.81 | ▼15.52 |
| Total valid votes | | 1,25,020 | | |
| Registered electors | | 2,36,756 | | ▼19.85 |
| INC hold | | Swing | ▼9.65 | |

=== Assembly Election 2004 ===
2004 Maharashtra Legislative Assembly election : Aurangabad East
| Party | Candidate | Votes | % | ±% |
|---|---|---|---|---|
| INC | Dr. Kalyan Kale | 97,278 | 48.20 | ▲12.18 |
| BJP | Haribhau Bagade | 88,168 | 43.69 | ▼4.70 |
| Independent | Mirza Nisar Baig Mirza Aziz Baig | 4,592 | 2.28 | New |
| BSP | Bhole Madhukarrao Shanker Rao | 3,810 | 1.89 | ▲1.53 |
| Independent | Pawar Shriram Bhimrao | 2,165 | 1.07 | New |
| BBM | Jadhav Vishram Asaram | 1,794 | 0.89 | New |
| Margin of victory | | 9,110 | 4.51 | ▼7.86 |
| Turnout | | 2,01,828 | 68.32 | ▲10.17 |
| Total valid votes | | 2,01,825 | | |
| Registered electors | | 2,95,409 | | ▲26.73 |
| INC gain from BJP | | Swing | ▼0.19 | |

=== Assembly Election 1999 ===
1999 Maharashtra Legislative Assembly election : Aurangabad East
| Party | Candidate | Votes | % | ±% |
|---|---|---|---|---|
| BJP | Haribhau Bagade | 65,596 | 48.39 | ▲17.17 |
| INC | Autade Keshavrao Vishwanath | 48,823 | 36.02 | ▲16.02 |
| NCP | Sudhakar Sonwane | 17,783 | 13.12 | New |
| JD(U) | Saluja Dhanbirsingh (Kukkuseth) | 1,787 | 1.32 | New |
| Margin of victory | | 16,773 | 12.37 | ▲1.15 |
| Turnout | | 1,55,265 | 66.61 | ▼11.05 |
| Total valid votes | | 1,35,557 | | |
| Registered electors | | 2,33,101 | | ▲1.74 |
| BJP hold | | Swing | ▲17.17 | |

=== Assembly Election 1995 ===
1995 Maharashtra Legislative Assembly election : Aurangabad East
| Party | Candidate | Votes | % | ±% |
|---|---|---|---|---|
| BJP | Haribhau Bagade | 49,496 | 31.22 | ▼16.67 |
| INC | Sau. Parvatibai Trimbakrao | 31,698 | 19.99 | ▼17.79 |
| Independent | Autade Keshavrao Vishwanath | 27,131 | 17.11 | New |
| Independent | Dr. Gadekar Namdeorao Balwantrao | 23,447 | 14.79 | New |
| BBM | Sulane Trimbaksing Daulatsing | 7,245 | 4.57 | New |
| Independent | Rambhav Eknathrao Gavande | 4,072 | 2.57 | New |
| JD | Jadhav Namdeo Khandu Bagayatdar | 3,299 | 2.08 | ▼0.99 |
| Margin of victory | | 17,798 | 11.23 | ▲1.12 |
| Turnout | | 1,64,699 | 71.88 | ▲11.15 |
| Total valid votes | | 1,58,556 | | |
| Registered electors | | 2,29,116 | | ▲14.59 |
| BJP hold | | Swing | ▼16.67 | |

=== Assembly Election 1990 ===
1990 Maharashtra Legislative Assembly election : Aurangabad East
| Party | Candidate | Votes | % | ±% |
|---|---|---|---|---|
| BJP | Haribhau Bagade | 55,581 | 47.89 | ▲5.28 |
| INC | Trimbakrao Ganpatrao Sirasth | 43,856 | 37.78 | ▲3.22 |
| JD | Shiriram Rajaram Patil | 3,563 | 3.07 | New |
| Independent | Parasram Jesu Rathod | 2,387 | 2.06 | New |
| Independent | Datta Annasahen Pathrikar | 1,931 | 1.66 | New |
| Independent | Nazeerkhan Chandkhan | 1,761 | 1.52 | New |
| Independent | Madhukarrao Shankarrao Bhole | 1,659 | 1.43 | New |
| Margin of victory | | 11,725 | 10.10 | ▲2.06 |
| Turnout | | 1,19,057 | 59.54 | ▲8.90 |
| Total valid votes | | 1,16,068 | | |
| Registered electors | | 1,99,950 | | ▲30.14 |
| BJP hold | | Swing | ▲5.28 | |

=== Assembly Election 1985 ===
1985 Maharashtra Legislative Assembly election : Aurangabad East
| Party | Candidate | Votes | % | ±% |
|---|---|---|---|---|
| BJP | Haribhau Bagade | 32,174 | 42.61 | ▲15.92 |
| INC | Sudhakar Sonwane | 26,103 | 34.57 | New |
| Independent | Kacharu Raibhan Jadhav | 5,451 | 7.22 | New |
| Independent | Jadhav Ambadas Girijaram | 4,834 | 6.40 | New |
| Independent | Kishor Motiram Narwade | 2,292 | 3.04 | New |
| Independent | Sahebrao Jija Kuber | 2,289 | 3.03 | New |
| Independent | Verma Ramlakhan Matadin | 1,128 | 1.49 | New |
| Margin of victory | | 6,071 | 8.04 | ▲1.55 |
| Turnout | | 78,044 | 50.80 | ▲1.61 |
| Total valid votes | | 75,514 | | |
| Registered electors | | 1,53,638 | | ▲14.16 |
| BJP gain from INC(I) | | Swing | ▲7.64 | |

=== Assembly Election 1980 ===
1980 Maharashtra Legislative Assembly election : Aurangabad East
| Party | Candidate | Votes | % | ±% |
|---|---|---|---|---|
| INC(I) | Autade Keshavrao Vishwanath | 22,369 | 34.96 | ▼9.50 |
| INC(U) | Jadhav Vishwanath Suryabhan | 18,219 | 28.48 | New |
| BJP | Dandge Raosaheb Bhaurao | 17,073 | 26.69 | New |
| Independent | Madhukar Shankarrao Bhole | 3,299 | 5.16 | New |
| [[Janata Party (Secular) Charan Singh|Janata Party (Secular) Charan Singh]] | Vinayakrao Saluba Wagh | 1,512 | 2.36 | New |
| Independent | Patel Yasin Magan | 1,505 | 2.35 | New |
| Margin of victory | | 4,150 | 6.49 | ▲3.94 |
| Turnout | | 66,268 | 49.24 | ▼10.34 |
| Total valid votes | | 63,977 | | |
| Registered electors | | 1,34,585 | | ▲9.58 |
| INC(I) gain from JP | | Swing | ▼12.04 | |

=== Assembly Election 1978 ===
1978 Maharashtra Legislative Assembly election : Aurangabad East
| Party | Candidate | Votes | % | ±% |
|---|---|---|---|---|
| JP | Gawande Rambhau Eknath | 33,414 | 47.01 | New |
| INC(I) | Keshaorao Vishwanath Awatade | 31,606 | 44.46 | New |
| RPI | D. L. Hiwrala | 3,236 | 4.55 | ▼8.92 |
| Independent | Bhaulal Namdeo Bhalekar | 1,546 | 2.17 | New |
| Independent | Ashok Vithalrao Patil | 1,279 | 1.80 | New |
| Margin of victory | | 1,808 | 2.54 | ▼1.26 |
| Turnout | | 73,867 | 60.14 | ▲10.79 |
| Total valid votes | | 71,081 | | |
| Registered electors | | 1,22,818 | | ▲26.28 |
| JP gain from INC | | Swing | ▲2.40 | |

=== Assembly Election 1972 ===
1972 Maharashtra Legislative Assembly election : Aurangabad East
| Party | Candidate | Votes | % | ±% |
|---|---|---|---|---|
| INC | V Rao Sukyabhan Jadhav | 20,429 | 44.61 | ▼9.81 |
| ABJS | Rambhav Eknathrao Gavande | 18,685 | 40.80 | ▲7.02 |
| RPI | Deorao Limbaji | 6,168 | 13.47 | New |
| Independent | Uttamrao Shinde | 514 | 1.12 | New |
| Margin of victory | | 1,744 | 3.81 | ▼16.84 |
| Turnout | | 47,904 | 49.26 | ▼45.67 |
| Total valid votes | | 45,796 | | |
| Registered electors | | 97,256 | | ▲162.18 |
| INC hold | | Swing | ▼9.81 | |

=== Assembly Election 1967 ===
1967 Maharashtra Legislative Assembly election : Aurangabad East
| Party | Candidate | Votes | % | ±% |
|---|---|---|---|---|
| INC | V. Suryabhan | 18,725 | 54.42 | New |
| ABJS | R. Eknath | 11,622 | 33.78 | New |
| PWPI | K. B. Motale | 4,060 | 11.80 | New |
| Margin of victory | | 7,103 | 20.64 | |
| Turnout | | 37,095 | 100.00 | |
| Total valid votes | | 34,407 | | |
| Registered electors | | 37,095 | | |
| INC win (new seat) | | | | |
