= Imtiyaz Jaleel =

Indian politician (born 1968)

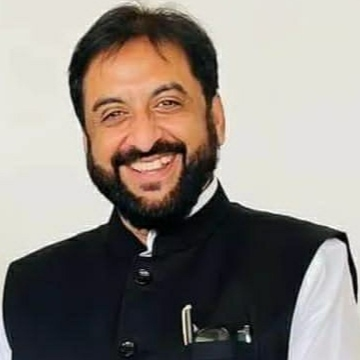

Member of Parliament, Lok Sabha
- In office 23 May 2019 – 4 June 2024
- Preceded by: Chandrakant Khaire
- Succeeded by: Sandipanrao Bhumre
- Constituency: Aurangabad

Member of the Maharashtra Legislative Assembly
- In office 15 October 2014 – 23 May 2019
- Preceded by: Pradeep Jaiswal
- Succeeded by: Pradeep Jaiswal
- Constituency: Aurangabad Central

Maharashtra State President of All India Majlis-e-Ittehadul Muslimeen
- Incumbent
- Assumed office 2019; 7 years ago

Member of Maharashtra State Board Of Waqf
- In office 5 February 2021 – 5 June 2024

Personal details
- Born: Imtiyaz Jaleel Syed; 10 August 1968 (age 58) Aurangabad, Maharashtra, India
- Party: All India Majlis-e-Ittehadul Muslimeen (AIMIM)
- Spouse: Roomi Fatema (m. 1993)
- Children: 2
- Education: Dr. Babasaheb Ambedkar Marathwada University
- Occupation: Politician, journalist
- Profession: Politician
- Awards: Newsmakers Achievers Award
- Website: https://www.aimim.org/

Imtiyaz Jaleel Syed (born 10 August 1968), also known as Syed Imtiyaz Jaleel, is an Indian politician, journalist and member of the All India Majlis-e-Ittehadul Muslimeen. In the 2019 General Elections, Jaleel was elected as Member of Parliament, Lok Sabha from Aurangabad Lok Sabha Constituency. He was elected as member of Maharashtra Legislative Assembly from Aurangabad Central constituency in 2014. He is also the state president of All India Majlis-e-Ittehadul Muslimeen in Maharashtra as well as a member of the Standing Committee of the Urban Development (UD).

== Early life ==
Jaleel was born and raised in Aurangabad to Syed Abdul Jaleel and Zakiya Jaleel. His father was a civil surgeon and his brother a manager at Jet Airways. Jaleel married Roomi Fatema on 8 July 1993, with whom he has two sons. He completed both his Master of Business Administration (1996) and Master of Mass Communication and Journalism (2000) from Dr. Babasaheb Ambedkar Marathwada University.

== Political career ==
Initially Jaleel worked as a journalist for Lokmat and NDTV. He entered politics in 2014 when he contested from the Aurangabad Central Assembly constituency for All India Majlis-e-Ittehadul Muslimeen (MIM). He started his campaign 22 days before the polling and defeated the sitting Shiv Sena legislator Pradeep Jaiswal by a margin of around 20,000 votes.

On 23 April 2015, under the leadership of Imtiaz Jaleel, MIM won 25 seats in the Aurangabad Municipal Corporation elections. During DPDC meeting which was held on 29 January 2015, Imtiyaz Jaleel raised the issue of costly MRI charges at the government-run hospital in Aurangabad. Then District Guardian Minister Ramdas Kadam directed GMCH authorities to reduce the charges of MRI scan from Rs 1,800 to Rs 700.

On 14 October 2017, Jaleel had filed a public interest litigation (PIL) before the Aurangabad bench of Bombay high court, seeking direction to the state government to allot seven acres of land to build a 200-bed hospital for women and children in Aurangabad. The court had directed the state and district administration to file a reply within six months.

On 26 March 2019, MIM decided to contest Aurangabad Lok Sabha seat in Maharashtra in alliance with the Vanchit Bahujan Aghadi led by Prakash Ambedkar. MIM President Asaduddin Owaisi had picked Imtiyaz Jaleel as the party candidate.

Jaleel won the Aurangabad Lok Sabha seat defeating the four-time sitting MP from the Shiv Sena, Chandrakant Khaire, with a slim margin of 4,492 vote. Commenting on the results, Chitra Lele, professor of political science at SNDT University said, “By not raking up national issues and shunning criticism of Narendra Modi, Jaleel avoided polarisation of votes on religious lines. On the other hand, a split in the votes going to Khaire, and AIMIM’s alliance with VBA ensured that he gets votes from Dalits and other deprived communities”.

Since 2021, Jaleel has sat on the Maharashtra Waqf Board. In the 2024 Lok Sabha election, Jaleel lost to Sandipanrao Bhumre of Shiv Sena by 134,650 votes.

On 18 October 2024, the All India Majlis e Ittehadul Muslimeen (AIMIM) Maharashtra announced that Jaleel would contest the 2024 Lok Sabha by election from the Nanded Parliamentary Constituency in Maharashtra. However, a different AIMIM candidate actually ran but the election was won by the Indian National Congress's candidate, Ravindra Vasantrao Chavan.

== Positions held ==
#	From	To	Position	Political party
1.	2014	2019	MLA (1st term) from Aurangabad Central	All India Majlis-e-Ittehadul Muslimeen
2.	2019	2024	MP (1st term) from Aurangabad	All India Majlis-e-Ittehadul Muslimeen

== Public activity ==
=== Protested outside the Aurangabad Airport ===
On 31 July 2017, Taslima Nasrin, a feminist known for her writing on criticism of religion, landed on Aurangabad Airport to visit Ajanta and Ellora Caves. Led by Imtiaz Jaleel, a group of people protested outside the Aurangabad Airport. After the backlash from protesters, Aurangabad police stopped Nasrin from stepping outside the airport and advised her to go back.

=== Tiranga Rally Muslim Reservation ===
On 11 December 2021, Jaleel led the Tiranga rally organised by the Majlis party from Aurangabad to Mumbai demanding 5% reservation to the Muslim community in Maharashtra. Jaleel said that the AIMIM party would not contest the upcoming local body elections in Maharashtra if the MVA Government did not give 5% reservation to the Muslim community.

=== Adarsh Co-operative Bank Scams ===
Jaleel took a stance against financial scams plaguing cooperative banks and societies. In a letter addressed to Prime Minister Narendra Modi and Union Home Minister Amit Shah, Jaleel called for a thorough investigation by central agencies like the CBI or ED into these irregularities. Adarsh Nagari Sahkari Credit Co-operative, which was under scrutiny for a Rs. 202 crore scam.

Jaleel's rally for justice garnered attention as he sought to protect the interests of underprivileged individuals, elderly citizens, and farmers in the district who had been adversely affected by these financial wrongdoings. He also urged the authorities to conduct a comprehensive investigation into the operations of Adarsh Nagari Credit Society and Malkapur Urban Cooperative Bank.

==== Chief Minister of Maharashtra on Scam ====
Adarsh Adarsh Co-operative Bank Scam case: the accused will sell their assets and return their money to the depositors; Testimony of Chief Minister Eknath Shinde.

== Awards and recognition ==
=== Best Working Politician Award 2023 ===
Jaleel was honoured with the ‘15th News makers Achievers Awards 2023’ in the ‘Best Working Politician’ category on 1 May 2023 at Yashwant Rao Chavan Auditorium, Mumbai.

== Notable work ==
=== Reducing Passport Processing Time from 30-45 days to just 7-10 days ===
Jaleel played a key role in modernising the Aurangabad Passport Seva Kendra (POPSK), which initially had lengthy processing times. His efforts led to the establishment of a modernised center with scanners, reducing passport processing time from 30–45 days to just 7–10 days. This change significantly improved passport services, benefitting citizens in the region.

=== PIL for 400 Bed Hospital instead of politician Gopinath Munde Statue ===
Jaleel played a pivotal role in the establishment of a 400-bed women and neonatal hospital in Aurangabad. In 2017, Jaleel filed a Public Interest Litigation (PIL) that prompted the Aurangabad bench of the Bombay High Court to intervene in the stalled project, originally sanctioned in 2013 but delayed due to lack of available land. Following the court's directives, the district collector allocated 21,853 square meters of prime land at the Government Milk Dairy for the hospital. District civil surgeon SV Kulkarni confirmed the land possession and outlined plans for construction, with the state government funding the project. Jaleel expressed satisfaction with this progress, noting that the high court would monitor the hospital's development.

== Personal views ==
In February 2019, on the occasion of Shivaji Jayanti, Jaleel said Shivaji was a secular leader who stood for communal harmony but history books had been distorted to show him as anti Muslim.

== Controversies ==
On 11 June 2022, while protesting against the controversial statement of Nupur Sharma regarding Prophet Muhammad, Jaleel said she should be hanged in Aurangabad.
