= Ramesh Bornare =

Indian politician

Ramesh Bornare Patil रमेश बोरनारे पाटील

Member of the Maharashtra Legislative Assembly
- Incumbent
- Assumed office October 2019
- Preceded by: Bhausaheb Patil
- Constituency: Vaijapur

Personal details
- Born: 27 July 1966 (age 60)
- Party: Shiv Sena
- Other political affiliations: Shivsena

Ramesh Bornare Patil (Marathi: रमेश बोरनारे) is a Shiv Sena politician from Aurangabad district, Maharashtra. He was a Member of Legislative Assembly from Vaijapur Vidhan Sabha constituency from Shiv Sena.

Ramesh Bornare Patil won the 2019 Vidhan Sabha election from Vaijapur with a record 57,000 vote margin.

== Positions held ==
- 2017: Elected as Member of Zilla Parishad, Aurangabad
- 2019: Elected to Maharashtra Legislative Assembly
