= Dahegaon, Maharashtra =

Village in Maharashtra

Coordinates: 21.044°N 79.024°E

Dahegaon is a village in Vaijapur taluka in Aurangabad district in the state of Maharashtra in India. It has population of around 2,320.

== Notable people ==
- Ramkrishna Baba Patil, former member of Maharashtra Legislative Assembly and Member of Parliament, Lok Sabha
