= Sanjay Shirsat =

Indian politician

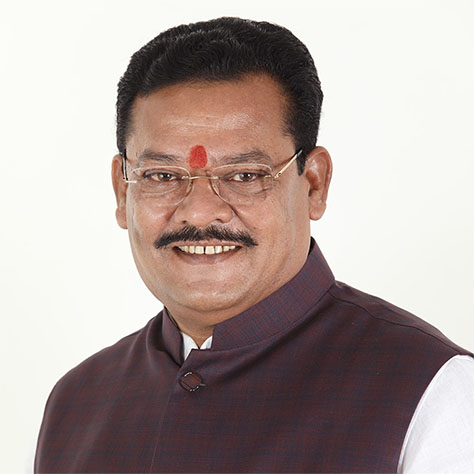

Cabinet Minister Government of Maharashtra
- Incumbent
- Assumed office 15 December 2024
- Minister: Social Justice
- Governor: C. P. Radhakrishnan; Acharya Devvrat additional charge
- Cabinet: Third Fadnavis ministry
- Chief Minister: Devendra Fadnavis
- Deputy CM: Eknath Shinde; Ajit Pawar (till his demise in 2026) Sunetra Pawar (from 2026)
- Guardian Minister: NA
- Preceded by: Eknath Shinde

Member of the Maharashtra Legislative Assembly
- Incumbent
- Assumed office (2009-present)
- Preceded by: Rajendra Darda
- Constituency: Aurangabad West

Personal details
- Born: 29 November 1961 (age 64) Chhatrapati Sambhajinagar, Maharashtra
- Party: Shiv Sena
- Spouse: Vijaya Shirsat
- Children: 3 Children; Siddhant Shirsat, Tushar Shirsat, Harshada Shirsat

Sanjay Pandurang Shirsat is an Indian politician serving as MLA in Maharashtra Legislative Assembly from Aurangabad West Vidhan Sabha constituency as a member of Shiv Sena. He has been elected to the Vidhan Sabha for four consecutive terms in 2009, 2014, 2019 and 2024.

== Positions held ==
- 2009: Elected to Maharashtra Legislative Assembly (1st Term)
- 2014: Re-elected to Maharashtra Legislative Assembly (2nd Term)
- 2019: Re-elected to Maharashtra Legislative Assembly (3rd Term)
- 2024: Re-elected to Maharashtra Legislative Assembly (4th Term)
- 15 December 2024: Minister for Social Justice
