= Pradeep Jaiswal =

Indian politician

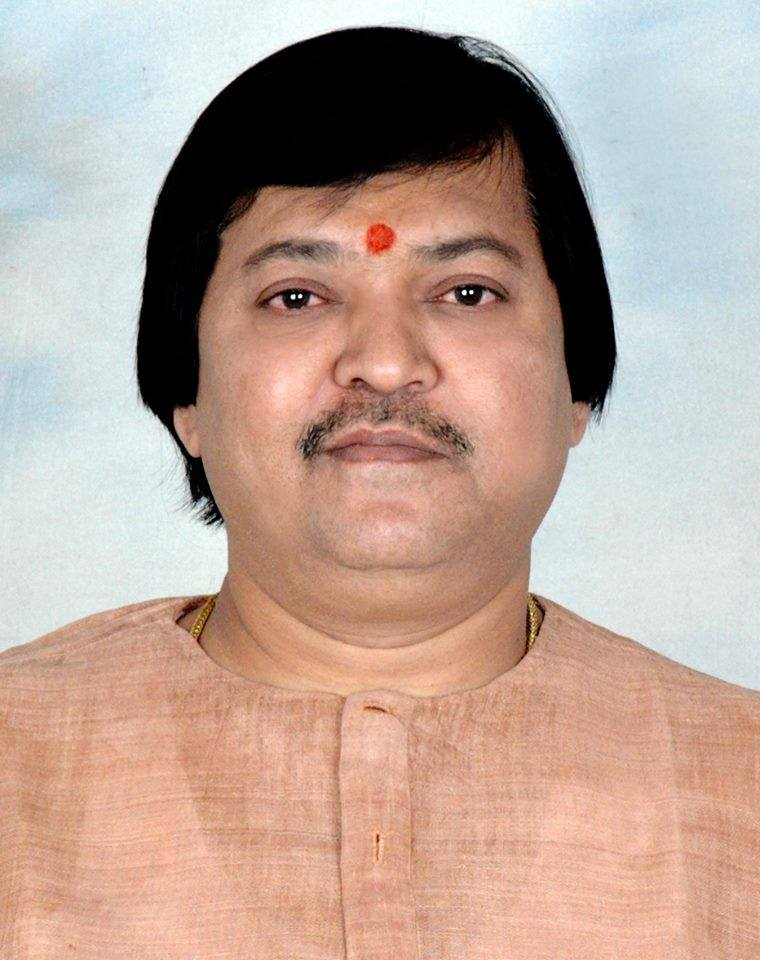

Member of Maharashtra Legislative Assembly
- Incumbent
- Assumed office 2019
- Preceded by: Imtiyaz Jaleel
- Constituency: Aurangabad Central
- In office 2009–2014
- Preceded by: Constituency Created
- Succeeded by: Imtiyaz Jaleel
- Constituency: Aurangabad Central

Member of Parliament, Lok Sabha
- In office 1996–1998
- Preceded by: Moreshwar Save (Shiv Sena)
- Succeeded by: Ramkrishna Baba Patil (Indian National Congress)
- Constituency: Aurangabad

Mayor of Aurangabad Municipal Corporation

Personal details
- Born: 28 October 1960 (age 65) Aurangabad, Maharashtra, India
- Party: Shiv Sena
- Spouse: Saroj Pradeep Jaiswal
- Children: 2
- Profession: Politician
- Website: www.pradeepjaiswal.in/

Pradeep Jaiswal is a Shiv Sena politician from Aurangabad, Maharashtra. He was a Member of Legislative Assembly from Aurangabad Central Vidhan Sabha constituency from Shiv Sena. He had also served as Mayor of Aurangabad Municipal Corporation.

== Positions held ==
- 1996: Elected to 11th Lok Sabha
- 2009: Elected to Maharashtra Legislative Assembly
- 2014: Appointed Shiv Sena Aurangabad City Chief (Mahanagar Pramukh)
- 2019: Elected to Maharashtra Legislative Assembly
