= Aurangabad Bangar =

- Census town
- Location in Uttar Pradesh, India Aurangabad Bangar (India)
- Coordinates: 27.44°N 77.69°E
- Country: India
- State: Uttar Pradesh
- District: Mathura
- Named for: Emperor Aurangzeb

Population (2001)
  - Total: 8,819

Languages
  - Official: Hindi
- Time zone: UTC+5:30 (IST)
- Vehicle registration: UP
- Website: up.gov.in

Aurangabad Bangar is a census town in Mathura district in the state of Uttar Pradesh, India.

== Geography ==
Aurangabad Bangar is located at 27.44°N 77.69°E.

== Demographics ==
As of 2001 India census, Aurangabad Bangar had a population of 8,819. Males constitute 53% of the population and females 47%. Aurangabad Bangar has an average literacy rate of 62%, higher than the national average of 59.5%; with 60% of the males and 40% of females literate. 19% of the population is under 6 years of age.
