= Prashant Bamb =

Indian politician

Member of the Maharashtra Legislative Assembly for Gangapur
- Incumbent
- Assumed office 2009
- Preceded by: Annasaheb Mane Patil

Personal details
- Born: 18 January 1972 (age 54) Lasur Station
- Party: Bharatiya Janata Party
- Website: mahabjp.eorg

Prashant Bansilal Bumb is an Indian politician and member of the Bharatiya Janata Party. He has been elected four times as a member of Maharashtra Legislative Assembly from the Gangapur, Maharashtra Assembly constituency.

== Positions held ==
- MLA - Maharashtra Legislative Assembly

== Terms in Office ==
• 2009 – Elected to Maharashtra Legislative Assembly (1st Term)

• 2014 – Re Elected to Maharashtra Legislative Assembly (2nd Term)

• 2019 – Re Elected to Maharashtra Legislative Assembly (3rd Term)

• 2024 - Re Elected to Maharashtra Legislative Assembly (4th Term)
