= Bhaurao Dagadurao Deshmukh =

Indian politician

Bhaurao D Deshmukh

M P
- In office 1962–1967
- Preceded by: Swami Ramanand Tirtha
- Constituency: Aurangabad
- In office 1967–1971

Personal details
- Born: 29 December 1922
- Party: INC
- Children: 4 sons, 3 daughters
- Profession: Advocate and Agriculturist
- As of 22 February, 2012

Bhaurao Dagadurao Deshmukh (born 29 December 1922) was an Indian politician who was a member of the 3rd and 4th Lok Sabha, representing the Aurangabad constituency of Maharashtra. He was a member of the Indian National Congress (INC) party.

Deshmukh was born on 29 December 1922. He studied law at Osmania University at Hyderabad. Deshmukh was married to Shashikala and had 4 sons and 3 daughters. He resided at Bhokharden in then Auragabad district.

Deshmukh was member of Hyderabad State Assembly from 1952 to 1956, and a member of the Bombay State Assembly in 1956.
