= Chandrakant Khaire =

Indian politician from Maharashtra

Member of Parliament, Lok Sabha
- In office (1999-2004), (2004-2009), (2009-2014), (2014-2019)
- Preceded by: Ramkrishna Baba Patil (INC)
- Succeeded by: Syed Imtiyaz Jaleel (AIMIM)
- Constituency: Aurangabad

Leader of Shiv Sena (Uddhav Balasaheb Thackeray) Party
- Incumbent
- Assumed office January 2018

Member of Maharashtra Legislative Assembly
- In office (1990-1995), (1995 – 1999)
- Constituency: Aurangabad West

Minister for Housing, Slum Improvement and Urban Land Ceiling, Maharashtra
- In office May 1995 – June 1997

Minister for Transport, Maharashtra
- In office June 1997 – May 1998

Minister for Forests and Environment, Maharashtra
- In office May 1998 – June 1999

Personal details
- Born: Chandrakant Bhaurao Khaire; 1 January 1952 (age 74) Chhatrapati Sambhaji Nagar, Hyderabad State, India
- Party: Shiv Sena (Uddhav Balasaheb Thackeray)
- Spouse: Vaijayanti Khaire (m. 1975)
- Children: 4
- Profession: Politician; social worker; industrialist; trade unionist
- As of 16 September, 2006

Chandrakant Bhaurao Khaire (born 1 January 1952) is an Indian politician. He is a member of the Shiv Sena (UBT) political party from Aurangabad. He was elected consecutively for 4 terms to the Lok Sabha in the years 1999, 2004, 2009 and 2014. He was a two time MLA from Aurangabad West in 1990 and 1995. He had also served as cabinet minister in Maharashtra state government from 1995 to 1999 in the Shiv Sena Government.

== Personal life ==
Chandrakant Bhaurao Khaire was born on 1 January 1952 to Bhaurao and Vatsala Khaire in Aurangabad, Maharashtra. He completed his Diploma in Personnel Management from Dr. Babasaheb Ambedkar Marathwada University. Khaire married Kasturi Choudhari on 5 January 1975, with whom he has two sons and two daughters. He is an industrialist and trade unionist by profession.

== Positions held ==
- 1985 : Founder Member, Shiv Sena Party, Marathwada
- 1988 : Corporator, Municipal Corporation, Gulmandi Ward, Aurangabad
- 1988-90 : Leader of the Opposition, Municipal Corporation, Aurangabad
- 1990-99 : Member, Maharashtra Legislative Assembly (two terms)
- 1992-95 : Member, Estimates Committee, Maharashtra Legislative Assembly
- 1992-1995 : Sampark Pramukh, Shiv Sena Party, Aurangabad
- 1995-1997 : Cabinet Minister, Housing, Slum Improvement and Urban Land Ceiling, Maharashtra
- 1997-1998 : Cabinet Minister, Transport, Maharashtra
- 1998-1999 : Cabinet Minister, Environment, Maharashtra
- 1995-1999 : Guardian Minister, District Aurangabad
- 1999 : Elected to 13th Lok Sabha (1st term)
- 2002-2004 : Leader, Shiv Sena Parliamentary Party (Lok Sabha)
- 2004 : Elected to 14th Lok Sabha (2nd term)
- 2005 onwards Deputy Leader, Shiv Sena
- 2009 : Elected to 15th Lok Sabha (3rd term)
- 2014 : Elected to 16th Lok Sabha (4th term)
- 2018: Appointed standing committee member of Employees state insurance corporation (ESIC)
- 2018 : Appointed Leader of Shiv Sena Party

== See also ==
- List of members of the 16th Lok Sabha
- List of members of the 15th Lok Sabha
- List of members of the 14th Lok Sabha
- 13th Lok Sabha
- Aurangabad West (Vidhan Sabha constituency)
- Manohar Joshi ministry (1995–99)
- Narayan Rane ministry

Political offices
Preceded by	Cabinet Minister for Housing, Maharashtra State; May 1995–June 1997	Succeeded by
Preceded by	Cabinet Minister for Transport, Maharashtra State; June 1997–May 1998	Succeeded by
Preceded by	Cabinet Minister for Forest and Environment, Maharashtra State; May 1998–June 1999	Succeeded by
Preceded by	Maharashtra State Guardian Minister for Aurangabad district, Maharashtra; 1995–1999	Succeeded by
