= Aurangabad Municipal Corporation =

Governing body of Aurangabad, Maharashtra, India

Aurangabad Municipal Corporation CS Nagar Municipal Corporation (CSMC)

Type
- Type: Municipal Corporation of the Aurangabad, Maharashtra

History
- Founded: 1982; 44 years ago

Leadership
- Mayor: Sameer Rajurkar, BJP
- Deputy Mayor: Rajendra Janjal, Shiv Sena (S)
- Leader of Opposition: Sameer Sajid, AIMIM
- Municipal commissioner & Administrator: G. Shreekanth (IAS)

Structure
- Seats: 115
- Political groups: Government (70): BJP (57); SS (13); Opposition (44): AIMIM (33); SS(UBT) (6); VBA (4); INC (1); NCP-SP (1)

Elections
- Last election: 15 January 2026
- Next election: 2031

Website
- https://chhsambhajinagarmc.org

The Aurangabad Municipal Corporation (officially, Chhatrapati Sambhajingar Municipal Corporation) is the governing body of the city of Aurangabad in the Indian state of Maharashtra. The municipal corporation consists of democratically elected members, is headed by a mayor and administers the city's infrastructure, public services and police. Members of the state's leading political parties hold elected offices in the corporation. Aurangabad municipal corporation is located in Aurangabad.

== Administration ==
Aurangabad Municipal Corporation (AMC) is the local civil body. It is divided into nine zones. The Municipal Council was established in 1936 and the Municipal Council area was about 54.5 km^{2}. It was elevated to the status of Municipal Corporation from 8 December 1982, and simultaneously included eighteen peripheral villages, bringing the total area under its jurisdiction to 138.5 km^{2} and extending its limits.

The city is divided into 115 electoral wards called Prabhag, and each ward is represented by a Corporator elected by the people from each ward. There are two Committees, General Body and Standing Committee headed by the Mayor and the chairman, respectively. AMC is responsible for providing basic amenities like drinking water, drainage facility, roads, streetlights, health care facilities, primary schools, etc. AMC collects its revenue from the urban taxes which are imposed on citizens. The administration is headed by the Municipal Commissioner; an I.A.S. Officer, assisted by the other officers of different departments.

| City officials | | |
|---|---|---|
| Mayor | Sameer Rajurkar | Feb 2026 |
| Municipal Commissioner and Administrator | G. Shrikant | Dec 2019 |
| Deputy Mayor | Rajendra Janjal | Feb 2026 |
| Leader of House | Sameer Rajurkar | |
| Leader of Opposition | Sameer Sajid Builder | 2026 |
| Police Commissioner | Chiranjeev Prasad | May 2018 |

== List of mayors ==
| # | Portrait | Name | Party | | Term | | | Election |
| 1 | | Shantaram Kale | Indian National Congress | | 17 May 1988 | 5 July 1989 | 1 year, 49 days | 1988 |
| 2 | | Moreshwar Save | Shiv Sena | | 5 July 1989 | 19 May 1990 | 318 days | 1988 |
| 3 | | Pradeep Jaiswal | Shiv Sena | | 19 May 1990 | 13 May 1991 | 359 days | 1988 |
| 4 | | Manmohansingh Oberoi | Indian National Congress | | 13 May 1991 | 28 May 1992 | 1 year, 15 days | 1988 |
| 5 | | Ashok Yadav | Indian National Congress | | 28 May 1992 | 30 April 1993 | 337 days | 1988 |
| 6 | | Sunanda Kolhe | Shiv Sena | | 29 April 1995 | 18 April 1996 | 355 days | 1995 |
| 7 | | Gajanan Barwal | Shiv Sena | | 18 April 1996 | 7 May 1997 | 1 year, 19 days | 1995 |
| 8 | | Abdul Rashid Khan | Indian National Congress | | 7 May 1997 | 20 April 1998 | 348 days | 1995 |
| 9 | | Shitlatai Gunjal | Shiv Sena | | 20 April 1998 | 20 April 1999 | 1 year, 0 days | 1995 |
| 10 | | Sudam Patil Sonwane | Shiv Sena | | 20 April 1999 | 29 April 2000 | 1 year, 9 days | 1995 |
| 11 | | Bhagwat Karad | Bharatiya Janata Party | | 29 April 2000 | 31 July 2001 | 1 year, 93 days | 2000 |
| 12 | | Vikas Jain | Shiv Sena | | 4 September 2001 | 29 October 2002 | 1 year, 55 days | 2000 |
| 13 | | Vimaltai Rajput | Shiv Sena | | 29 October 2002 | 3 February 2004 | 1 year, 97 days | 2000 |
| 14 | | Rukmini Shinde | Shiv Sena | | 12 February 2004 | 29 April 2005 | 1 year, 76 days | 2000 |
| 15 | | Kishanchand Tanwani | Shiv Sena | | 29 April 2005 | 4 November 2006 | 1 year, 189 days | 2005 |
| (11) | | Bhagwat Karad | Bharatiya Janata Party | | 14 November 2006 | 29 October 2007 | 349 days | 2005 |
| 16 | | Vijaya Rahatkar | Bharatiya Janata Party | | 29 October 2007 | 28 April 2010 | 2 years, 181 days | 2005 |
| 17 | | Anita Ghodele | Shiv Sena | | 29 April 2010 | 28 October 2012 | 2 years, 182 days | 2010 |
| 18 | | Kala Oza | Shiv Sena | | 29 October 2012 | 28 April 2015 | 2 years, 181 days | 2010 |
| 19 | | Trimbak Tupe | Shiv Sena | | 29 April 2015 | 30 November 2016 | 1 year, 215 days | 2015 |
| 20 | | Bhagwan Ghadmode | Bharatiya Janata Party | | 14 December 2016 | 28 October 2017 | 318 days | 2015 |
| 21 | | Nandkumar Ghodele | Shiv Sena | | 29 October 2017 | 28 April 2020 | 2 years, 182 days | 2015 |
| – | | Vacant | | – | 28 April 2020 | 10 February 2026 | 5 years, 288 days | |
| 22 | | Sameer Rajurkar | Bharatiya Janata Party | | 10 February 2026 | Incumbent | 285 days | 2026 |

== Administrative rule ==
According to the provisions of Article 2437 of the Indian Constitution and 66 (A) of the Maharashtra Municipal Corporation Act, 1949, the term of a municipal corporation is five years. Also, in accordance with the provisions of the Municipal Corporation Act and especially the provisions of Section 452 (A) and (B), Due to a delayed election because of the COVID-19 pandemic and other reasons, the State Government appointed Astik Kumar Pandey (IAS), the commissioner of the corporation, as the Administrator for the management of the corporation.

== Revenue sources ==
The following are the Income sources for the corporation from the Central and State Government.

=== Revenue from taxes ===
Following is the Tax related revenue for the corporation.

- Property tax.
- Profession tax.
- Entertainment tax.
- Grants from Central and State Government like Goods and Services Tax.
- Advertisement tax.

=== Revenue from non-tax sources ===
Following is the Non-Tax related revenue for the corporation.

- Water usage charges.
- Fees from Documentation services.
- Rent received from municipal property.
- Funds from municipal bonds.

== Election results ==
=== 2026 ===
| Party | Seats | +/- |
|---|---|---|
| Bharatiya Janata Party | 57 | ▲35 |
| All India Majlis-e-Ittehadul Muslimeen | 33 | ▲8 |
| Shiv Sena | 13 | ▼16 |
| Shiv Sena (UBT) | 6 | New entry |
| Vanchit Bahujan Aaghadi | 4 | New entry |
| Indian National Congress | 1 | ▼9 |
| Nationalist Congress Party – SP | 1 | New entry |
| Total | 115 | |

=== 2015 ===
| Party | Seats | +/- |
|---|---|---|
| Shiv Sena | 29 | |
| All India Majlis-e-Ittehadul Muslimeen | 25 | ▲25 |
| Bharatiya Janata Party | 22 | |
| Indian National Congress | 10 | |
| Bahujan Samaj Party | 5 | |
| Nationalist Congress Party | 3 | |
| Independent | 19 | |
| Total | 113 | |
