= Gangapur, Maharashtra Assembly constituency =

Constituency of the Maharashtra legislative assembly in India

Coordinates: 19.70°N 75.01°E

Gangapur
- Constituency No. 111 for the Maharashtra Legislative Assembly

Constituency details
- Country: India
- Region: Western India
- State: Maharashtra
- Division: Chhatrapati Sambhajinagar
- District: Chhatrapati Sambhajinagar
- Lok Sabha constituency: Aurangabad
- Established: 1957
- Total electors: 365,051

Member of Legislative Assembly
- 15th Maharashtra Legislative Assembly
- Incumbent Prashant Bansilal Bamb
- Party: BJP
- Elected year: 2024

Gangapur Assembly constituency is one of the six constituencies of the Maharashtra Legislative Assembly, that are located in the Aurangabad district.

== Members of Legislative Assembly ==
Year	Member	Party
1957	Chandragupta Digamberdas	Communist Party of India
1962	Yamajirao Satpute	Indian National Congress
1967	Babasaheb Pawar	Indian National Congress
1972	Babasaheb Pawar	Indian National Congress
1978	Laxman Manal	Indian National Congress
1980	Ashok Rajaram Dongaonkar Patil	Indian National Congress (I)
1985	Kisanrao Kasane	Indian Congress (Socialist)
1990	Kailash Bhairunath Patil	Shiv Sena
1995	Ashok Rajaram Dongaonkar Patil	Independent
1999	Annasaheb Mane Patil	Shiv Sena
2004	Annasaheb Mane Patil	Shiv Sena
2009	Prashant Bamb	Independent
2014	Prashant Bamb	Bharatiya Janata Party
2019	Prashant Bamb	Bharatiya Janata Party
2024	Prashant Bamb	Bharatiya Janata Party

== Election results ==
=== Assembly Election 2024 ===
2024 Maharashtra Legislative Assembly election : Gangapur
Party	Candidate	Votes	%	±%
BJP	Prashant Bansilal Bamb	125,555	46.83%	▼6.24
NCP-SP	Satish Chavan	120,540	44.96%	New
VBA	Anil Ashok Chandaliya	8,839	3.30%	▼4.60
Independent	Suresh Sahebrao Sonwane	3,658	1.36%	New
Sardar Vallabhbhai Patel Party	Anita Ganesh Vaidya	3,467	1.29%	New
Independent	Shivaji Bapurao Thube	1,769	0.66%	New
NOTA	None of the Above	1,466	0.55%	▼0.19
Margin of victory		5,015	1.87%	▼15.44
Turnout		269,581	73.85%	▲9.03
Total valid votes		268,115		
Registered electors		365,051		▲16.42
BJP hold		Swing	▼6.24	

=== Assembly Election 2019 ===
2019 Maharashtra Legislative Assembly election : Gangapur
Party	Candidate	Votes	%	±%
BJP	Prashant Bansilal Bamb	107,193	53.07%	▲22.72
NCP	Santosh Annasaheb Mane Patil	72,222	35.75%	▲17.58
VBA	Ankush Baburao Kalwane	15,951	7.90%	New
NOTA	None of the Above	1,491	0.74%	▲0.01
BSP	Acchelal Ramnaresh Yadav	1,445	0.72%	New
Independent	Shaikh Gulam Ali Mohmmad Hussain	1,273	0.63%	New
Margin of victory		34,971	17.31%	▲7.86
Turnout		203,547	64.92%	▼2.91
Total valid votes		201,992		
Registered electors		313,553		▲15.49
BJP hold		Swing	▲22.72	

=== Assembly Election 2014 ===
2014 Maharashtra Legislative Assembly election : Gangapur
Party	Candidate	Votes	%	±%
BJP	Prashant Bansilal Bamb	55,483	30.35%	New
SS	Ambadas Danve	38,205	20.90%	▲1.00
NCP	Krishna Sahebrao Pa. Dongaokar	33,216	18.17%	▲6.51
INC	Khosre Shobhabai Jagannath	16,826	9.20%	New
Independent	Chavhan Sarjerao Vishwanath	14,238	7.79%	New
Independent	Ashok Gorakhnath Jadhav	5,404	2.96%	New
MNS	Patel Badsha Abdul	5,302	2.90%	▼1.82
NOTA	None of the Above	1,331	0.73%	New
Margin of victory		17,278	9.45%	▼6.37
Turnout		184,262	67.87%	▲5.73
Total valid votes		182,793		
Registered electors		271,496		▲12.59
BJP gain from Independent		Swing	▼5.37	

=== Assembly Election 2009 ===
2009 Maharashtra Legislative Assembly election : Gangapur
Party	Candidate	Votes	%	±%
Independent	Prashant Bansilal Bamb	53,067	35.72%	New
SS	Annasaheb Mane Patil	29,568	19.90%	▼12.21
Independent	Krishna Sahebrao Patil Dongaonkar	23,786	16.01%	New
NCP	Kundlik Pandurang Mane	17,327	11.66%	▼17.52
MNS	Dilip Bhausaheb Bankar	7,012	4.72%	New
SP	Kailas Bhairunath Patil	4,426	2.98%	▼24.26
Independent	Akbar Baig Hasan Baig	2,482	1.67%	New
Margin of victory		23,499	15.82%	▲12.89
Turnout		148,682	61.66%	▼1.28
Total valid votes		148,548		
Registered electors		241,146		▼4.49
Independent gain from SS		Swing	▲3.61	

=== Assembly Election 2004 ===
2004 Maharashtra Legislative Assembly election : Gangapur
Party	Candidate	Votes	%	±%
SS	Annasaheb Mane Patil	50,985	32.11%	▼1.65
NCP	Vilas Dadarao Chavan	46,342	29.19%	New
SP	Ashok Patil Dongaonkar	43,243	27.24%	▲16.78
BSP	Valibhai Shaikh	4,596	2.89%	▲2.14
Independent	Sanjay Kacharu Ture	3,306	2.08%	New
CPI	Budhinath	2,612	1.65%	▲0.04
BBM	Shirale Mane Ramnath Laxman	1,690	1.06%	New
Margin of victory		4,643	2.92%	▲1.04
Turnout		158,795	62.89%	▲2.30
Total valid votes		158,765		
Registered electors		252,495		▲22.33
SS hold		Swing	▼1.65	

=== Assembly Election 1999 ===
1999 Maharashtra Legislative Assembly election : Gangapur
Party	Candidate	Votes	%	±%
SS	Annasaheb Mane Patil	42,211	33.76%	▲13.11
INC	Krishna Sahebrao Patil Dongaokar	39,849	31.87%	▲16.76
Independent	Ashok Patil Dongaonkar	22,803	18.24%	New
SP	Vilas Dadarao Chavan	13,073	10.46%	New
Independent	Sampat Shejul	2,221	1.78%	New
CPI	Jorawarkha Alias Jillu Mamu	2,001	1.60%	▼2.68
BSP	Shaikh Walimeeya Pirsab	938	0.75%	New
Margin of victory		2,362	1.89%	▼2.74
Turnout		138,142	66.93%	▼8.03
Total valid votes		125,031		
Registered electors		206,408		▲0.69
SS gain from Independent		Swing	▲8.48	

=== Assembly Election 1995 ===
1995 Maharashtra Legislative Assembly election : Gangapur
Party	Candidate	Votes	%	±%
Independent	Ashok Rajaram	35,544	25.28%	New
SS	Ashatai Shrimantrao	29,037	20.65%	▼19.93
INC	Kailas Bahirunath Patil	21,256	15.12%	▼15.88
Independent	Sahebrao Patil Dongaonker	20,952	14.90%	New
JD	Vilas T. Nage	8,070	5.74%	▲3.66
CPI	Taksal Manohar Pandharinath	6,017	4.28%	New
Independent	Hiwale Kaduba Punjaba	4,805	3.42%	New
Margin of victory		6,507	4.63%	▼4.95
Turnout		147,468	71.94%	▲11.99
Total valid votes		140,626		
Registered electors		204,986		▲8.91
Independent gain from SS		Swing	▼15.30	

=== Assembly Election 1990 ===
1990 Maharashtra Legislative Assembly election : Gangapur
Party	Candidate	Votes	%	±%
SS	Kailas Patil	43,233	40.58%	New
INC	Sahebrao Patil Dongaonker	33,024	30.99%	▼7.60
Independent	Ashok Rajaram	22,620	21.23%	New
JD	Laxman Suryabhan Tambe Patil	2,213	2.08%	New
Margin of victory		10,209	9.58%	▲1.39
Turnout		109,524	58.19%	▲9.82
Total valid votes		106,549		
Registered electors		188,217		▲27.02
SS gain from IC(S)		Swing	▼6.21	

=== Assembly Election 1985 ===
1985 Maharashtra Legislative Assembly election : Gangapur
Party	Candidate	Votes	%	±%
IC(S)	Kisanrao Kasane	32,435	46.78%	New
INC	Laxmanrao Munal	26,757	38.59%	New
CPI	Jorawarkha Mahelbubkha Alias Jillu Mamu	4,510	6.51%	▼5.27
Independent	Chandrakant Lammanrao Jadhav	2,727	3.93%	New
Independent	Ramnath Laxman Shirale	1,150	1.66%	New
Independent	Raosaheb Laxman Chavan	728	1.05%	New
Margin of victory		5,678	8.19%	▼4.36
Turnout		71,426	48.20%	▲6.26
Total valid votes		69,328		
Registered electors		148,184		▲6.40
IC(S) gain from INC(I)		Swing	▲5.81	

=== Assembly Election 1980 ===
1980 Maharashtra Legislative Assembly election : Gangapur
Party	Candidate	Votes	%	±%
INC(I)	Ashok Rajaram	23,126	40.97%	New
INC(U)	Laxmanrao Eknatharao Manal	16,041	28.42%	New
Independent	Paraskumar Balchand	7,383	13.08%	New
CPI	Jorawarkhan Alias Jillu Mamu Maheboobkhan	6,644	11.77%	▲2.16
BJP	Asaram Sakharam Bankar	2,092	3.71%	New
Independent	Harichand Motising	769	1.36%	New
Independent	Maksudhkhan Chandkhan	389	0.69%	New
Margin of victory		7,085	12.55%	▼11.28
Turnout		58,927	42.31%	▼6.15
Total valid votes		56,444		
Registered electors		139,268		▲11.67
INC(I) gain from INC		Swing	▼3.91	

=== Assembly Election 1978 ===
1978 Maharashtra Legislative Assembly election : Gangapur
Party	Candidate	Votes	%	±%
INC	Laxman Eknath Manal	26,128	44.88%	▼23.51
JP	Asaram Sakharam	12,251	21.04%	New
Independent	Baburao Dattatraya Pawar	8,431	14.48%	New
CPI	Manohar Pandhrinath Taksal	5,593	9.61%	▼10.63
Independent	Sahebrao Chimaji Pakhre	2,065	3.55%	New
Independent	Kapse Gambhirrao Bala Patil	2,054	3.53%	New
Independent	Kharat Ramchandra Garibrao ( Guruji )	1,694	2.91%	New
Margin of victory		13,877	23.84%	▼24.32
Turnout		61,126	49.01%	▲0.59
Total valid votes		58,216		
Registered electors		124,710		▲36.43
INC hold		Swing	▼23.51	

=== Assembly Election 1972 ===
1972 Maharashtra Legislative Assembly election : Gangapur
Party	Candidate	Votes	%	±%
INC	Balasaheb Ramrao Pawar	28,812	68.39%	▲3.4
CPI	Vishwanath Bandu Bhosale	8,525	20.23%	▼12.5
RPI(K)	Khajekar Sakharam Genji	2,440	5.79%	New
RPI	Bhimrao Haribhau Gaik Jad	2,354	5.59%	New
Margin of victory		20,287	48.15%	▲15.90
Turnout		44,856	49.07%	▼7.58
Total valid votes		42,131		
Registered electors		91,407		▲14.57
INC hold		Swing	▲3.40	

=== Assembly Election 1967 ===
1967 Maharashtra Legislative Assembly election : Gangapur
Party	Candidate	Votes	%	±%
INC	Balasaheb Ramrao Pawar	27,829	64.99%	▲4.79
CPI	C. Digamberdas	14,019	32.74%	▲1.79
Independent	B. Bhika	972	2.27%	New
Margin of victory		13,810	32.25%	▲3.00
Turnout		45,341	56.83%	▲4.39
Total valid votes		42,820		
Registered electors		79,783		▲14.88
INC hold		Swing	▲4.79	

=== Assembly Election 1962 ===
1962 Maharashtra Legislative Assembly election : Gangapur
Party	Candidate	Votes	%	±%
INC	Yamajirao Mhatarrao	20,600	60.20%	New
CPI	Baburao Dattatraya Pawar	10,590	30.95%	New
Independent	Maruti Nana	1,639	4.79%	New
Independent	Bhanudas Eknath	1,392	4.07%	New
Margin of victory		10,010	29.25%	
Turnout		36,990	53.26%	
Total valid votes		34,221		
Registered electors		69,446		
INC win (new seat)				
