= Vanchit Bahujan Aaghadi =

Indian Political Party

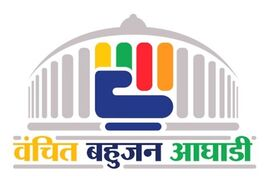
- Abbreviation: VBA
- President: Prakash Ambedkar
- Founder: Prakash Ambedkar
- Founded: 1 January 2018 (8 years ago)
- Merger of: Bharipa Bahujan Mahasangh (2019)
- Headquarters: First Floor, Thackersey House, Ballard Estate, Fort, Mumbai, Maharashtra 400001
- Newspaper: Prabuddha Bharat
- Ideology: Ambedkarism; Social equality Constitutionalism; Secularism; Socialism; Progressivism
- Colours
- ECI status: Unrecognised Registered Party
- Alliance: AIMIM+ (2019)
- Seats in Rajya Sabha: 0 / 245
- Seats in Lok Sabha: 0 / 543
- Seats in Maharashtra Legislative Assembly: 0 / 288

Election symbol
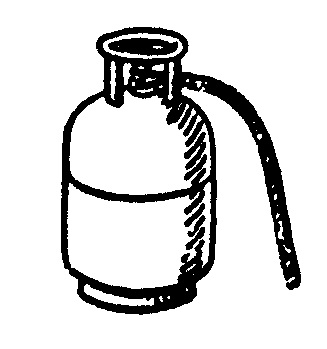

Website
- vbabharat.org

The Vanchit Bahujan Aaghadi (translation: Deprived Majority Front; abbr. VBA) is an Indian political party founded by Prakash Ambedkar on 20 March 2018. The party is primarily based in Maharashtra in India. Vanchit Bahujan Aaghadi follows Phule-Ambedkarite ideology.

== History and background ==
On 1 January 2018, the name "Vanchit Bahujan Aaghadi" was first used in a convention held by Dhangar community people at Pandharpur, Maharashtra. The convention was presided over by Prakash Ambedkar. So far, around 100 small political parties and social organizations have participated in this convention. In June 2018, a decision was taken to constitute a political party, that is the Vanchit Bahujan Aaghadi by all pro-progressive parties in a meeting in the presence of Prakash Ambedkar, Laxman Mane, Haridas Bhade and Vijay More. "There will be the inclusion of all progressive parties in this front (VBA), and this political front will be led by the eminent leader Prakash Ambedkar and existence of each progressive party shall be upheld". In this way, Prakash Ambedkar explained the doctrine of the Vanchit Bahujan Aaghadi. Later, on 20 May 2018, Ambedkar established the Vanchit Bahujan Aaghadi. On 15 March 2018, Ambedkar asserted that the Election Commission of India has announced the list of registered parties in India, and "Vanchit Bahujan Aaghadi" has been recognized as a registered political party, moreover Bharipa Bahujan Mahasangh, a political party shall be dissolved into Vanchit Bahujan Aaghadi as said by Prakash Ambedkar. On 28 September 2018, the first session of the VBA was held at Solapur and resulted in agreement from the All India Majlis-e-Ittehadul Muslimeen to form a coalition. The Coalition Vanchit Bahujan Aaghadi is going to contest for the upcoming Lok Sabha and Legislative Assembly elections 2018 in the state Maharashtra. Ambedkar subsequently organised public gatherings throughout Maharashtra under the VBA banner. In the beginning, efforts were made to organise the masses through conventions and at district levels and conferences in the name of farmers, workers, youths, and reservations.

On 23 February 2019, at Shivaji Park in Mumbai, an OBC Reservation Conference was held. Rajaram Patil, the leader of Agri-Koli community, presided over this conference in the presence of Ambedkar and Owaisi and discussed OBC rights. Furthermore, in Mumbai, there are 200 villages in Agri, Koli, Bhandari, Bombay East Indians tribal for which the government should distribute the property cards, to entitle them to the right to self development, in the same manner the development of slums should be done as per village site law. The people received huge response in the meeting at Shivaji Park, Mumbai. The meetings held by these alliances have received great response so far. Adequate efforts were also made to get Ambedkar along with Indian National Congress-Nationalist Congress Party for the anti-Bharatiya Janata Party agitation. In order to give representation for the deprived communities such as Muslim, Dhangar, Koli, Nomadic tribes OBC and smaller OBC communities, VBA demanded 12 seats (two seats for each community) to the Indian National Congress. Congress offered four seats to the Vanchit Bahujan Aaghadi. "We had proposed 12 seats initially before Congress, but the proposal did not get any positive response. [There] now there is talk of 22 seats, but that has also been revoked," said Prakash Ambedkar. Thereafter VBA took a rigid stand to contest all 48 seats in the state Maharashtra.

In July 2019, Laxman Mane split from the VBA and formed new party, the Maharashtra Bahujan Vanchit Aaghadi.

=== Office holders ===
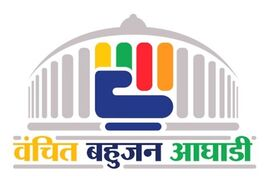
President Vanchit Bahujan Aaghadi
S.No.	Portrait	Name (born /death)	Party Officer (Presidents)	Term in office		
S.No.	Portrait	Name (born /death)	Party Officer (Presidents)	Assumed office	Left office	Time in office
1		Prakash Ambedkar born 10 May 1954	President Vanchit Bahujan Aaghadi	1 January 2018	Incumbent	8 years, 268 days

== Candidature ==
=== 2019 Indian general election in Maharashtra ===
In March 2019, VBA declared its first list of 37 candidates along with their caste or religions being mentioned. The candidates of VBA have been selected from different politically deprived communities such as Dhangar, Kunbi, Bhil, Buddhist, Koli, Vadar, Lohar, Varli, Banjara, Muslim, Mali, Kaikadi, Bhoi, Matang, Agri, Shimpi, Lingayat, Golla and Maratha. Ambedkar said the caste of the candidates had been given because no other political party does so and it was essential to highlight that these people were, in his opinion, kept out of politics by competing parties because of issues relating to caste. Out of the 48 seats in the 2019 Lok Sabha seat in Maharashtra, AIMIM is contesting in one seat of Aurangabad and the VBA candidate for the remaining 47 seats. The Election Commission of India has given election symbol "Teacup" (Cup Bashi) to most of the VBA candidates for the 2019 Lok Sabha elections. Prakash Ambedkar, the party leader, has been an MP twice from the Akola Loksabha constituency before losing his seat in the 2019 elections.

In the Lok Sabha elections 2019, the sole candidate of AIMIM Imtiyaz Jaleel won while no candidate from VBA could win the polls. In the 17 constituencies of the state, the candidates of the VBA got more than 80,000 votes. According to the figures released by the Election Commission of India, in the Lok Sabha elections held in Maharashtra in 2019, VBA and AIMIM candidates had got 4,132,242 (7.64%) votes. 47 candidates standing on the VBA ticket received 37,43,200 votes, it was 6.92% of the total votes in Maharashtra and VBA had 7.08% votes of the 47 constituencies contested (excluding Aurangabad). In all the 48 constituencies in Maharashtra, 54,054,245 voters were polled, out of which 1,198,221 voters were polled in the Aurangabad constituency. VBA supported AIMIM was the first place in a Lok Sabha constituency in Aurangabad for getting more votes, whereas VBA was the second in the Akola constituency and VBA was in the third place in 41 constituencies.

=== 2019 Maharashtra Legislative Assembly election ===
The party had an alliance with the All India Majlis-e-Ittehadul Muslimeen until 6 September 2019. The alliance disintegrated due to differences arising from seat distribution during the 2019 State Elections in Maharashtra. The AIMIM, led by Asaduddin Owaisi, had hoped to contest 100 seats out of total 288 Seats of Maharashtra Legislative Assembly, but Prakash Ambedkar proposed a mere eight seats for Owaisi's party. Despite Owaisi's attempt to negotiate, Prakash Ambedkar stood firm, effectively signaling the end of the alliance without explicitly stating it. Prakash Ambedkar is the VBA leader.

The Election Commission of India had given election symbol "Gas cylinder" to the VBA candidates for the 2019 Maharashtra Legislative Assembly election. VBA contested 234 of the 288 seats in 2019 Maharashtra Legislative Assembly election but won none. The VBA also supported 23 other non-VBA candidates. The VBA is the party which contested the second highest number of seats in the election, after the Bahujan Samaj Party (262 seats contested). According to the figures released by the Election Commission of India, in the Maharashtra Vidhan Sabha elections held in 2019, VBA candidates had got more than 24 lakh votes (4.6%). The VBA came in second place in 10 constituencies.

On 8 November 2019, the Bharipa Bahujan Mahasangha merged into the Vanchit Bahujan Aghadi.

=== 2024 Indian general election in Maharashtra ===
38 candidates of Vanchit Bahujan Aaghadi contested the 2024 Indian general election in Maharashtra, but all of them lost. VBA candidates got 15,82,855 (3.6%) votes in this election.

=== 2024 Maharashtra Legislative Assembly election ===
In the 2024 Maharashtra Legislative Assembly election, 200 candidates of Vanchit Bahujan Aaghadi contested the election but all were defeated. Almost half of these candidates were Buddhists VBA candidates got 14,13,961 (2.21%) votes in this election.

== Electoral performance ==
=== Lok Sabha ===
The Lok Sabha, also known as the House of the People, is the lower house of the bicameral Parliament of India, where the upper house is Rajya Sabha. Members of the Lok Sabha are elected by an adult universal suffrage and a first-past-the-post system to represent their respective constituencies, and they hold their seats for five years or until the body is dissolved by the president of India on the advice of the union council of ministers. The house meets in the Lok Sabha chamber of the Parliament House in New Delhi.

=== Lok Sabha Elections in Maharashtra ===
Members of the Lok Sabha
Members of the Lok Sabha Election in Maharashtra
Election Year	Leader	seats contested	seats won	+/- in seats	Popular vote	votes %	+/- in vote share	Sitting side
2019	Prakash Ambedkar	47	0 / 48	New entry	37,43,200	6.92%	New entry	Others
2024	Prakash Ambedkar	38	0 / 48	Steady	15,82,855	2.77%	▼4.15%	Others

=== Maharashtra Legislature Assembly Elections ===
Maharashtra Legislative Assembly
Maharashtra Legislative Assembly Election Performance
Election Year	Leader	seats contested	seats won	+/- in seats	Popular vote	votes %	+/- in vote share	Sitting side
2019	Prakash Ambedkar	236	0 / 288	New entry	25,23,583	4.58%	▲4.58%	Others
2024	Prakash Ambedkar	200	0 / 288	Steady	14,13,961	2.21%	▼2.37%	Others

== Manifesto ==
On 6 April 2019, the VBA said that the preamble of the Constitution of India is its manifesto. This declaration has focused on 27 different issues. These announcements have been given to 'KG to PG free education', bring Rashtriya Swayamsevak Sangh within the framework of the Indian Constitution, the status of independent religion to the Lingayatism and various schemes for the farmers.

== See also ==
- Bharipa Bahujan Mahasangh
- Politics of India
- List of political parties in India
- Politics of Maharashtra
