= 1991 Indian general election in Maharashtra =

10th Lok Sabha election in Maharashtra

- 20 May, 12 June and 15 June 1991
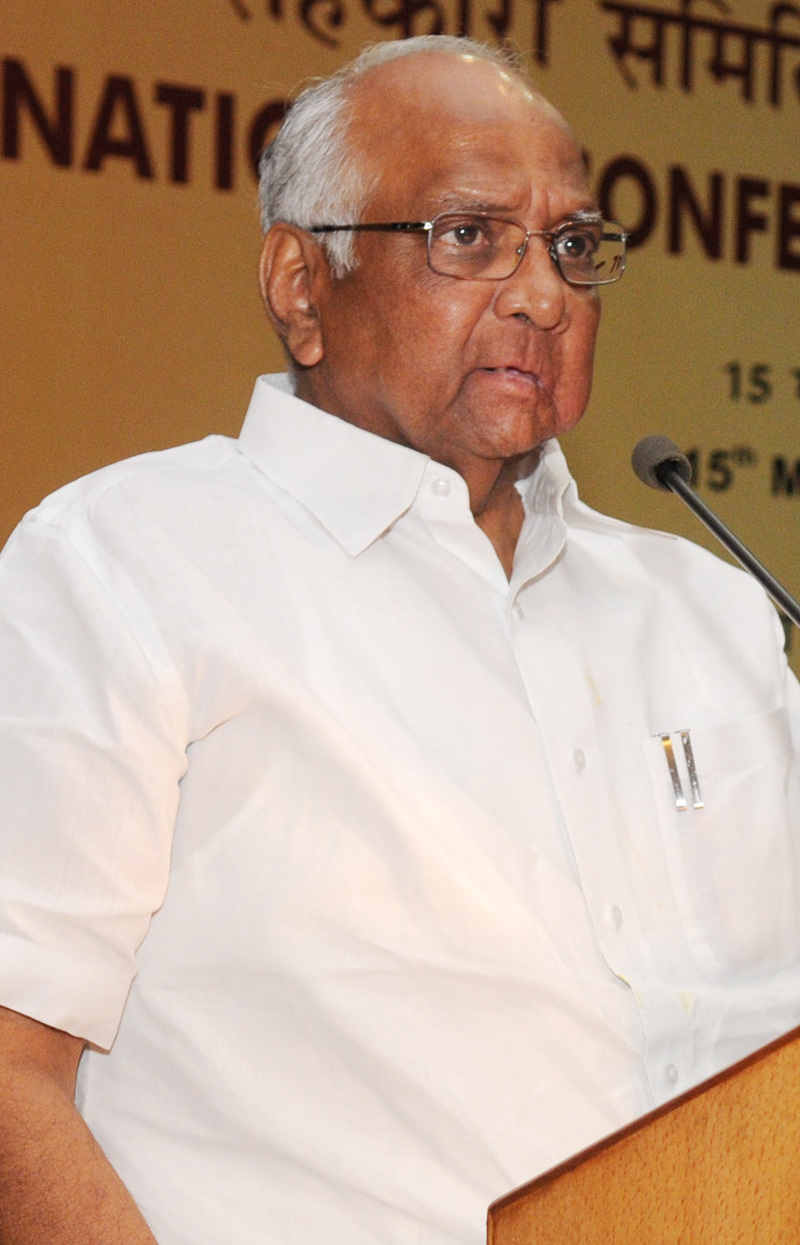

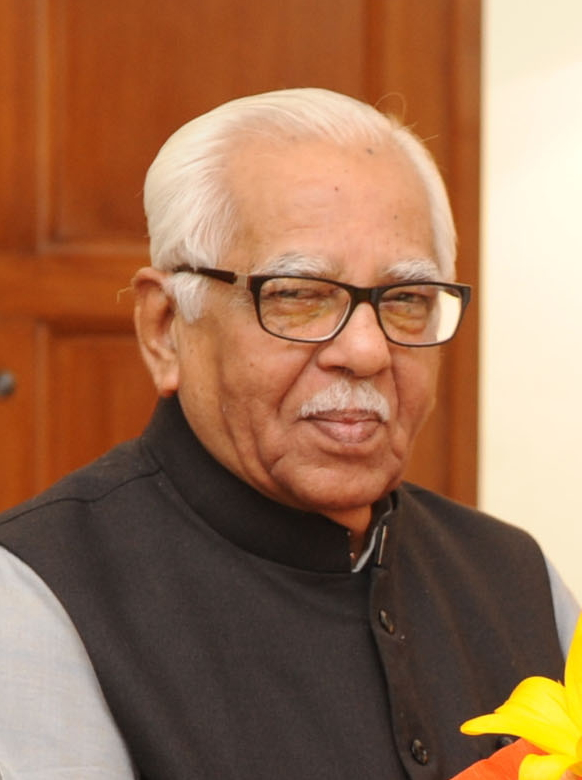

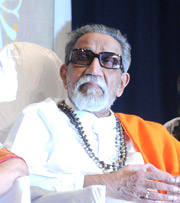
	First party	Second party	Third party
Leader	Sharad Pawar	Ram Naik	Bal Thackeray
Party	Indian National Congress	Bharatiya Janata Party	Shiv Sena
Leader's seat	Baramati (won)	Bombay North (won)	did not contest
Last election	28	10	3
Seats won	38	5	4
Seat change	▲10	▼5	▲1
Popular vote	1,12,80,003	47,06,765	22,01,391
Percentage	48.4%	20.19%	9.45%
Prime Minister before election
Chandra Shekhar
SJP(R)
Prime Minister after election
Narasimha Rao
INC

The 1991 general election was held from 20 May 1991 to 16 June 1991 on 48 Parliamentary constituencies of Maharashtra. The election were held for electing the members for the 10th Lok Sabha. The Indian National Congress became the largest party by winning 38 out of 48 seats, while Bharatiya Janata Party and Shiv Sena won 5 and 4 seats respectively. 1 seat was also won by Communist Party of India (Marxist).

== Parties and alliances ==
=== Yuti Alliance ===
Party	Flag	Symbol	Leader(s)	Seats contested
Bharatiya Janata Party			Pramod Mahajan	31
Shiv Sena			Suresh Prabhu	17
Total				48

=== Congress Alliance ===
Party	Flag	Symbol	Leader	Seats contested
Indian National Congress			Sharad Pawar	48
Total				48

=== National Front ===
Party	Flag	Symbol	Leader	Seats contested
Janata Dal			V. P. Singh	33
Indian Congress (Socialist) – Sarat Chandra Sinha			Sarat Chandra Sinha	3
Communist Party of India				3
Communist Party of India (Marxist)				2
Total				41

== List of Candidates ==
Constituency		INC		BJP+SHS	
#	Name	Party	Candidate	Party	Candidate
1	Rajapur	INC	Sudhir Sawant	SS	Wamanrao Mahadik
2	Ratnagiri	INC	Govindrao Nikam	SS	Anant Geete
3	Kolaba	INC	A. R. Antulay	SS	Satish Pradhan
4	Bombay South	INC	Murli Deora	BJP	Premkumar Sharma
5	Bombay South Central	INC	Dadasaheb Rupwate	SS	Mohan Rawale
6	Bombay North Central	INC	Sharad Dighe	SS	Vidyadhar Gokhale
7	Bombay North East	INC	Gurudas Kamat	BJP	Jayawantiben Mehta
8	Bombay North West	INC	Sunil Dutt	SS	Ramesh Prabhoo
9	Bombay North	INC	B. A. Desai	BJP	Ram Naik
10	Thane	INC	Haribansh Singh Ram	BJP	Ram Kapse
11	Dahanu (ST)	INC	Damodar Shingada	BJP	Chintaman Vanaga
12	Nashik	INC	Vasant Pawar	BJP	Daulatrao Aher
13	Malegaon (ST)	INC	Zamru Kahandole	SS	Pandurang Sonawane
14	Dhule (ST)	INC	Bapu Hari Chaure	BJP	Govindrao Chaudhari
15	Nandurbar (ST)	INC	Manikrao Gavit	BJP	Dilwarsing Padavi
16	Erandol	INC	Vijaykumar Patil	SS	Pradeep Uttamrao Patil
17	Jalgaon	INC	Mahajan J. Tukaram	BJP	Gunwantrao Sarode
18	Buldhana (SC)	INC	Mukul Wasnik	BJP	P. G. Gawai
19	Akola	INC	Gangane S. Ramkrishna	BJP	Pandurang Fundkar
20	Washim	INC	Anantrao Deshmukh	SS	Raju Ramu Naik
21	Amravati	INC	Pratibha Patil	SS	Prakash Bharsakale Patil
22	Ramtek	INC	Raje Tejsinghrao Bhonsle	BJP	Pandurang J. Hajare
23	Nagpur	INC	Datta Meghe	BJP	Banwarilal Purohit
24	Bhandara	INC	Praful Patel	BJP	Khushal Bopche
25	Chimur	INC	Vilas Muttemwar	BJP	Mahadeo Shivankar
26	Chandrapur	INC	Shantaram Potdukhe	BJP	Sudhir Mungantiwar
27	Wardha	INC	Vasant Sathe	BJP	Arun Adsad
28	Yavatmal	INC	Uttamrao Patil	BJP	Rajabhau Thakre
29	Hingoli	INC	Uttam Rathod	SS	Vilasrao Gundewar
30	Nanded	INC	Suryakanta Patil	SS	D. R. Deshmukh
31	Parbhani	INC	Manikrao Bhambale	SS	Ashokrao Deshmukh
32	Jalna	INC	Ankushrao Tope	BJP	Pundlik Hari Danve
33	Aurangabad	INC	Mohan Deshmukh	SS	Moreshwar Save
34	Beed	INC	Kesharbai Kshirsagar	BJP	Sadashiv Sitaram Munde
35	Latur	INC	Shivraj Patil	BJP	Gopalrao Patil
36	Osmanabad (SC)	INC	Arvind Kamble	BJP	Vimal Mundada
37	Sholapur	INC	Dharmanna Mondayya Sadul	BJP	Bhutada Goverdhandas
38	Pandharpur (SC)	INC	Sandipan Thorat	BJP	Shrikant Katake
39	Ahmednagar	INC	Yashwantrao Patil	BJP	Zarkar Rajabhau
40	Kopargaon	INC	Shankarrao Deoram	BJP	Gunjal Vasantrao Sakharam
41	Khed	INC	Vidura Nawale	SS	Khatape Vasant Maruti
42	Pune	INC	Vitthalrao Gadgil	BJP	Anna Joshi
43	Baramati	INC	Ajit Pawar	BJP	Pratibha Lokhande
44	Satara	INC	Prataprao Bhosale	SS	Hindurao Nimbalkar
45	Karad	INC	Prithviraj Chavan	BJP	Rajabhau Deshpande
46	Sangli	INC	Prakashbapu Patil	BJP	Biraje Appasaheb Prakash
47	Ichalkaranji	INC	Rajaram Shankarrao Mane	BJP	Vora Subhash Babubhai
48	Kolhapur	INC	Udaysingrao Gaikwad	SS	Phalake Ramchandra Shripatrao

== Results ==
=== Results by Party/Alliance ===
Alliance/ Party		Popular vote			Seats		
Alliance/ Party		Votes	%	±pp	Contested	Won	+/−
INC		1,12,80,003	48.40	▲3.04	48	38	▲10
BJP+	BJP	47,06,765	20.20	▼3.52	31	5	▼5
BJP+	SHS	22,01,391	9.45	▲8.22	17	4	▲3
BJP+	Total	69,08,156	29.65	Steady	48	9	Steady
CPI(M)		2,99,320	1.28	▲0.05	2	1	▲1
JD		24,56,784	10.54	▼0.41	33	0	▼5
CPI		2,30,499	0.99	▼0.95	3	0	▼1
IC(S)-SCS		14,434	0.06	▼0.70	7	0	
Others		11,40,314	4.90	Steady	164	0	Steady
IND		9,74,914	4.18	▼4.05	557	0	▼3
Total		2,33,04,424	100%	-	862	48	-

=== By constituency ===
Constituency		Poll%	Winner				Runner Up				Margin	%
#	Name	Poll%	Candidate	Party	Votes	%	Candidate	Party	Votes	%	Margin	%
1	Rajapur	48.88	Sudhir Sawant	INC	157,135	43.31	Wamanrao Mahadik	SHS	114,089	31.45	43,046	11.86
2	Ratnagiri	51.93	Govindrao Nikam	INC	191,864	47.22	Anant Geete	SHS	178,936	44.04	12,928	3.18
3	Kolaba	55.69	A. R. Antulay	INC	219,639	41.04	Datta Patil	PWPI	179,933	33.62	39,706	7.42
4	Bombay South	38.65	Murli Deora	INC	147,576	51.53	Sharma P. Shankardutt	BJP	121,820	42.54	25,756	8.99
5	Bombay South Central	42.48	Mohan Rawale	SHS	121,951	35.64	Dadasaheb Rupwate	INC	117,549	34.36	4,402	1.28
6	Bombay North Central	40.65	Sharad Dighe	INC	180,084	43.31	Vidyadhar Gokhale	SHS	165,872	39.89	14,212	3.42
7	Bombay North East	43.81	Gurudas Kamat	INC	337,660	51.37	Jayawantiben Mehta	BJP	278,536	42.38	59,124	8.99
8	Bombay North West	42.60	Sunil Dutt	INC	267,342	50.78	Ramesh Prabhoo	SHS	210,597	40.00	56,745	10.78
9	Bombay North	40.41	Ram Naik	BJP	304,500	48.06	B. A. Desai	INC	212,187	33.49	92,313	14.57
10	Thane	37.16	Kapse R. Ganesh	BJP	302,928	47.24	Haribansh Singh	INC	274,611	42.82	28,317	4.42
11	Dahanu (ST)	41.98	Damodar Barku Shingada	INC	178,453	40.16	Chintaman Vanaga	BJP	145,537	32.76	32,916	7.40
12	Nashik	50.72	Vasant Pawar	INC	310,247	57.81	Daulatrao Aher	BJP	168,881	31.47	141,366	26.34
13	Malegaon (ST)	44.42	Zamru Manglu Kahandole	INC	194,060	48.07	Haribahu Shankar Mahale	JD	109,760	27.19	84,300	20.88
14	Dhule (ST)	40.75	Bapu Hari Chaure	INC	211,895	58.00	Chaudhari G. Shivram	BJP	131,036	35.87	80,859	22.13
15	Nandurbar (ST)	48.96	Manikrao Hodlya Gavit	INC	287,293	66.91	Dilwarsing Padavi	BJP	118,403	27.58	168,890	39.33
16	Erandol	42.89	Vijaykumar Naval Patil	INC	180,909	44.27	P. K. Anna Patil	JP	98,916	24.21	81,993	20.06
17	Jalgaon	49.03	Gunavant Rambhau Saroda	BJP	233,587	49.57	Mahajan Jivram Tukaram	INC	209,322	44.42	24,265	5.15
18	Buldhana (SC)	50.83	Mukul Wasnik	INC	213,495	46.53	P. G. Gawai	BJP	176,404	38.44	37,091	8.09
19	Akola	54.50	Pandurang Fundkar	BJP	201,800	39.45	Gangane S. Ramkrishna	INC	156,687	30.63	45,113	8.82
20	Washim	53.16	Anantrao Vithhalrao Deshmukh	INC	173,708	38.66	Pawar Makhram Banduji	BRP	124,719	27.76	48,989	10.90
21	Amravati	45.27	Pratibha Patil	INC	177,265	42.33	Prakash Patil Bharsakale	SHS	121,784	29.08	55,481	13.25
22	Ramtek	47.95	Bhonsle T. Laxmanrao	INC	240,437	55.63	Pandurang Jayaramji Hajare	BJP	102,483	23.71	137,954	31.92
23	Nagpur	48.55	Datta Meghe	INC	274,448	45.97	Banwarilal Purohit	BJP	199,728	33.45	74,720	12.52
24	Bhandara	65.28	Praful Patel	INC	325,553	58.29	Khushal Bopche	BJP	161,995	29.00	163,558	29.29
25	Chimur	64.53	Muttemwar Vilas Baburao	INC	238,272	40.58	Mahadeo Shivankar	BJP	190,263	32.40	48,009	8.18
26	Chandrapur	50.98	Shantaram Potdukhe	INC	212,948	41.93	Temurde M. Vithalrao	JD	125,251	24.66	87,697	17.27
27	Wardha	49.24	Ghangare R. Marotrao	CPI(M)	182,436	40.81	Vasant Sathe	INC	158,906	35.55	23,530	5.26
28	Yavatmal	48.41	Uttamrao Deorao Patil	INC	187,861	43.91	Patil Narayan Sitaram	JD	116,931	27.33	70,930	16.58
29	Hingoli	48.82	Vilasrao Gundewar	SHS	145,800	32.41	Uttam Rathod	INC	142,007	31.57	3,793	0.84
30	Nanded	46.19	Suryakanta Patil	INC	251,021	51.07	D. R. Deshmukh	SHS	118,659	24.14	132,362	26.93
31	Parbhani	46.33	Ashokrao Deshmukh	SHS	143,293	32.95	Bangar Pratap Ganpatrao	JD	123,132	28.31	20,161	4.64
32	Jalna	53.88	Ankushrao Tope	INC	257,837	48.50	Pundlik Hari	BJP	189,630	35.67	68,207	12.83
33	Aurangabad	48.37	Moreshwar Save	SHS	235,859	41.38	Zakeria Rafic	JD	153,440	26.92	82,419	14.46
34	Beed	53.69	Kshirsagar Kesharbai	INC	260,035	43.55	Sadashiv Sitaram Munde	BJP	172,409	28.87	87,626	14.68
35	Latur	56.93	Shivraj Patil	INC	237,853	42.75	Gopalrao Patil	BJP	179,135	32.19	58,718	10.56
36	Osmanabad (SC)	52.42	Arvind Kamble	INC	236,627	52.13	Vimal Mundada	BJP	153,572	33.83	83,055	18.30
37	Sholapur	55.85	Sadul D. Mondayya	INC	262,623	53.13	Bhutada Gopikisan	BJP	182,533	36.93	80,090	16.20
38	Pandharpur (SC)	48.21	Sandipan Thorat	INC	315,641	66.85	Arun Krushnaji Kamble	JD	80,833	17.12	234,808	49.73
39	Ahmednagar	61.42	Yashwantrao Gadakh Patil	INC	279,520	46.41	Balasaheb Vikhe Patil	IND	267,883	44.48	11,637	1.93
40	Kopargaon	57.10	Kale Shankarrao Deoram	INC	311,367	63.40	Gunjal Vasantrao	BJP	138,910	28.28	172,457	35.12
41	Khed	48.21	Vidura Nawale	INC	276,013	60.88	Bankhele K. Baburao	JD	85,605	18.88	190,408	42.00
42	Pune	48.17	Anna Joshi	BJP	250,272	44.22	Vitthalrao Gadgil	INC	233,334	41.22	16,938	3.00
43	Baramati	46.91	Ajit Pawar	INC	437,293	75.31	Pratibha Lokhande	BJP	101,030	17.40	336,263	57.91
44	Satara	42.73	Prataprao Baburao Bhosale	INC	261,129	66.85	Hindurao Naik Nimbalkar	SHS	101,917	26.09	159,212	40.76
45	Karad	52.56	Prithviraj Chavan	INC	272,440	54.51	Nagnath Naikwadi	JD	180,060	36.03	92,380	18.48
46	Sangli	52.88	Patil Prakashbapu Vasantrao	INC	313,906	65.95	Lad Ganapati Dada	CPI	106,226	22.32	207,680	43.63
47	Ichalkaranji	53.37	Mane Balaso	INC	360,679	70.61	Sultanpure S. Virupaksha	JD	103,620	20.28	257,059	50.33
48	Kolhapur	46.93	Udaysingrao Gaikwad	INC	269,508	64.31	Phalake R. Shripatrao	SHS	75,177	17.94	194,331	46.37

== Post-election Union Council of Ministers from Maharashtra ==
#	Name	Constituency	Designation	Department	From	To	Party
1	Sharad Pawar	Baramati (Lok Sabha By-election)	Cabinet Minister	Defence	26 June 1991	5 March 1993	INC
2	Shankarrao Chavan	Maharashtra (Rajya Sabha)	Cabinet Minister	Home Affairs	21 June 1991	17 January 1996	INC
3	Ghulam Nabi Azad	Maharashtra (Rajya Sabha)	Cabinet Minister	Parliamentary Affairs	21 June 1991	17 January 1993	INC
3	Ghulam Nabi Azad	Maharashtra (Rajya Sabha)	Cabinet Minister	Civil Aviation and Tourism	9 January 1993	16 May 1996	INC
3	Ghulam Nabi Azad	Maharashtra (Rajya Sabha)	Cabinet Minister	Parliamentary Affairs	17 January 1996	16 May 1996	INC
4	N. K. P. Salve	Maharashtra (Rajya Sabha)	Cabinet Minister	Power	18 January 1993	16 May 1996	INC
5	Suresh Kalmadi	Maharashtra (Rajya Sabha)	Minister of State	Railways	15 September 1995	16 May 1996	INC
6	A. R. Antulay	Kolaba (Lok Sabha)	Cabinet Minister	Health and Family Welfare	11 June 1995	16 May 1996	INC
6	A. R. Antulay	Kolaba (Lok Sabha)	Cabinet Minister	Water Resources	17 January 1996	16 May 1996	INC
7	Mukul Wasnik	Buldhana (SC) (Lok Sabha)	Minister of State	Human Resource Development (Youth Affairs and Sports)	18 January 1993	16 May 1996	INC
7	Mukul Wasnik	Buldhana (SC) (Lok Sabha)	Minister of State	Parliamentary Affairs	19 January 1993	16 May 1996	INC
8	Vilas Baburao Muttemwar	Chimur (Lok Sabha)	Minister of State	Parliamentary Affairs	15 September 1995	16 May 1996	INC
8	Vilas Baburao Muttemwar	Chimur (Lok Sabha)	Minister of State	Rural Areas and Employment (Rural Employment & Poverty Alleviation)	15 September 1995	16 May 1996	INC
9	Shantaram Potdukhe	Chandrapur (Lok Sabha)	Minister of State	Finance	21 June 1991	17 January 1993	INC
