= Baburao Kadam =

Indian politician

Member of the Maharashtra Legislative Assembly
- Incumbent
- Assumed office 23 November 2024
- Preceded by: Nagesh Patil
- Constituency: Hadgaon

Personal details
- Born: 26 June 1979 (age 47) Bhandara
- Party: Shiv Sena (Ekanath Shinde)

Baburao Kadam Kohlikar (born 1968) is an Indian politician from Maharashtra. He is an MLA from Hadgaon Assembly constituency in Nanded district. He won the 2024 Maharashtra Legislative Assembly election representing the Shiv Sena.

== Early life and education ==
Kadam is from Hadgaon, Nanded district, Maharashtra. He is the son of Gunajirao Kadam. He completed his graduation and first year of MA at Yaswant College, Nanded which is affiliated with Marathwada University, Aurangabad but discontinued after 1993.

== Career ==
Kadam won from Hadgaon Assembly constituency representing the Shiv Sena in the 2024 Maharashtra Legislative Assembly election. He polled 113,245 votes and defeated his nearest rival, Madhavrao Patil of the Indian National Congress, by a margin of 30,067 votes. Earlier in 2024, he contested from the Hingoli Lok Sabha constituency but lost to Nagesh Patil of the Shiv Sena (UBT). He is the party's district president.
