= Rajeev Satav =

Indian politician (1974–2021)

Rajeev Shankarrao Satav

Member of Parliament, Rajya Sabha
- In office 2 April 2020 – 16 May 2021
- Preceded by: Husain Dalwai
- Succeeded by: Rajni Patil
- Constituency: Maharashtra

Member of Parliament, Lok Sabha
- In office 16 May 2014 – 23 May 2019
- Preceded by: Subhash Bapurao Wankhede
- Succeeded by: Hemant Sriram Patil
- Constituency: Hingoli

Member of Maharashtra Legislative Assembly
- In office 2009–2014
- Preceded by: Gajanan Ghuge
- Succeeded by: Santosh Kautika Tarfe
- Constituency: Kalamnuri

President of Indian Youth Congress of India
- In office Feb 2010 – Dec 2014
- Preceded by: Ashok Tanwar
- Succeeded by: Amrinder Singh Raja Warring

Personal details
- Born: 21 September 1974 Kalamnuri, Hingoli District
- Died: 16 May 2021 (aged 46) Pune, Maharashtra, India
- Party: Indian National Congress
- Spouse: Pradnya Rajeev Satav
- Children: 1 Son, 1 Daughter
- Education: ILS Law College, Pune
- As of March, 2020

Rajeev Shankarrao Satav (21 September 1974 – 16 May 2021) was an Indian politician from the Indian National Congress. At the time of his death, he was the member of the Rajya Sabha the upper house of Indian Parliament from Maharashtra.

== Biography ==
He was formerly Member of Parliament in 16th Lok Sabha from Hingoli in Maharashtra. He defeated Subhash Wankhede, Shiv Sena MP and a two time MLA. He has the distinction of wresting the Kalamnuri Assembly seat in Marathwada region from the Shiv Sena after 20 years in the 2009 elections. He was the All India Congress Committee (AICC) In charge for the State of Gujarat & Permanent Invitee to Congress Working Committee, the highest decision-making body of Indian National Congress. Before his appointment as In Charge of Gujarat he was also the AICC Secretary in charge for Saurashtra region during the Gujarat Vidhan Sabha Elections 2017, where Congress won the maximum seats.

Rajeev Satav was also a member of the Screening Committee for the Punjab Vidhan Sabha Elections 2017. He was President of the Indian Youth Congress from February 2010 to December 2014. Before occupying the position of President, Indian Youth Congress, he was President of Maharashtra Pradesh Youth Congress from May 2008 to February 2010.

Rajeev Satav was appointed the Member of Drafting Committee, Sub Group: Political Committee & Constitution Amendment Committee for the AICC Plenary Session 2018. Rajeev Satav was a Member of India - European Union Parliamentary Friendship Group & the Indian Parliamentary Group.

== Member of Parliament ==
He was Member of Parliament in Rajya Sabha (Upper House). Rajeev Satav was elected to the 16th Lok Sabha in 2014 from Hingoli constituency in Maharashtra after winning a closely fought election. The constituency is spread over two regions, Marathwada and Vidarbha.

Termed as a voice with clarity, Rajeev Satav has opened the Congress's response in Parliament on Aadhaar Bill, Skill Development, Constitutional Amendment for National Commission for Backward Classes Repeal Bill 2017 and others. Important parliamentary debates he's taken part in include those on agrarian crisis, MNREGA, drought, railways, Supplementary Demand for Grants, IIM Bill, Companies Law (Amendment) Bill and motion of thanks on President's address. He was a member of multiple Parliamentary committees, which are Standing Committee on Railways, Standing Committee on Defence, Committee on Welfare of Other Backward Classes, Joint Parliamentary Committee on Land Acquisition Bill and Consultative Committee on Youth Affairs & Sports. Rajeev Satav was also a member of Internal Parliamentary Committee of Congress Party which is tasked with examining Legislative Business during Parliament Session & Parliamentary Committee meetings.

Mr. Satav has raised important issues pertaining to Hingoli constituency and Maharashtra along with national issues through Supplementary Questions, Zero Hour Notices, and matters under Rule 377. Some issues by Mr. Satav include the demand for allowing admission to girl cadets in NDA, Farmers issue in Maharashtra, Need for a law to protect journalists, CAG report on Lack of Ammunition, anomalies in EPFO data, Demand for financial assistance to farmers affected due to drought, Need to review the increase in amount towards school development fund charged from students of Navodaya Vidyalayas & Demand of Loan Waiver for farmers in Maharashtra. His demand in the Lok Sabha resulted in an increase in the number of examination centers in Maharashtra for NEET Exams.

He has a Parliament attendance record of 81% which is higher than the national average. He has participated in 205 debates and asked 1075 questions (5th highest nationally) in the 16th Lok Sabha. He has introduced 23 private member's bills, (5th highest nationally) which include establishing Supreme Court circuit benches in India's metros, compulsory teaching of agricultural education and lowering of age to contest MP, MLA and MLC elections, Granting Paternity Benefit, High Court Bench at Hingoli, Special Package for the State of Maharashtra, Amendment in All India Services Act to ensure periodic review of bureaucrats, drafting of law in plain language bill, Unemployment Allowance Bill, The Agricultural Workers Welfare Fund Bill, 2018 etc.

Rajeev Satav is a four-time consecutive winner of the Sansad Ratna Award, an honour given to the top-performing Indian MPs. He has the second highest overall tally of initiated Debates, Private Members Bills and Questions among the First time MPs in the Lok Sabha.

Rajeev Satav was also conferred the "Bharat Asmita Jana Pratinidhi Shreshtha-2018 - Best Young Exponent of Parliamentary Practices" by MIT School of governance, Pune.

In 2020, Mr. Satav got elected to the upper house of the Indian Parliament as a candidate of INC. He submitted his Rajya Sabha nomination on 13 March in the presence of Uddhav Thackeray, Prithviraj Chavan, Ashok Chavan, Balasaheb Thorat, Jayant Patil and other leaders. He was in the Parliamentary Standing Committee on Defence and Consultative Committee for the Ministry of Civil Aviation. As a member of the Rajya Sabha, he spoke on the Finance Bill 2021 putting forth an in-depth analysis of the Bill.

== Opposing 2020 Indian agriculture acts ==
On 21 September 2020, Rajiv Satav along with seven other members were suspended from the Rajya Sabha for their unruly behaviour in the house by tearing documents, breaking mics, and heckling the Deputy Chairman of the Rajya Sabha.

== Death ==
He died in Pune, Maharashtra, India after spending 23 days in hospital due to post-COVID-19 complications with a cytomegalovirus infection.
