= Umarkhed Assembly constituency =

Constituency of the Maharashtra legislative assembly in India

Coordinates: 19.60°N 77.69°E

Umarkhed
- Constituency No. 82 for the Maharashtra Legislative Assembly

Constituency details
- Country: India
- Region: Western India
- State: Maharashtra
- District: Yavatmal
- Lok Sabha constituency: Hingoli
- Established: 1962
- Total electors: 317,398
- Reservation: SC

Member of Legislative Assembly
- 15th Maharashtra Legislative Assembly
- Incumbent Kisan Wankhede
- Party: Bharatiya Janata Party
- Elected year: 2024

Umarkhed Assembly constituency is one of the 288 constituencies of the Maharashtra Vidhan Sabha and one of the seven which are located in Yavatmal district of the Indian state of Maharashtra. It is reserved for candidates from the Scheduled Castes.

It is a part of Hingoli Lok Sabha constituency along with five other Vidhan Sabha constituencies, viz Basmath, Kalamnuri and Hingoli from Hingoli district and Kinwat and Hadgaon from Nanded district.

The remaining constituencies from Yavatmal district, Ralegaon (ST), Yavatmal (ST), Digras and Pusad are part of Yavatmal-Washim Lok Sabha constituency while Wani and Arni (SC) are part of Chandrapur Lok Sabha constituency.

== Members of Legislative Assembly ==
Year	Member	Party
1962	Ramchandra Namdeo Shingankar	Indian National Congress
1967	Shankarrao Ajaji Mane	Indian National Congress
1972	Shankarrao Ajaji Mane	Indian National Congress
1978	Anantrao Deosarkar Patil	Indian National Congress
1980	Trimbakrao Gopalrao Deshmukh	Indian National Congress (I)
1985	Bhimrao Apparao Deshmukh	Indian National Congress
1990	Prakash Deosarkar Patil	Janata Dal
1995	Uttam Raghoji Ingle	Bharatiya Janata Party
1999	Anantrao Deosarkar Patil	Indian National Congress
2004	Uttam Raghoji Ingle	Bharatiya Janata Party
2009	Vijayrao Khadse	Indian National Congress
2014	Rajendra Najardhane	Bharatiya Janata Party
2019	Namdev Sasane	Bharatiya Janata Party
2024	Kisanrao Wankhede	Bharatiya Janata Party

== Election results ==
=== Assembly Election 2024 ===
2024 Maharashtra Legislative Assembly election : Umarkhed
Party	Candidate	Votes	%	±%
BJP	Kisanrao Maroti Wankhede	108,682	49.57%	▲4.83
INC	Sahebrao Dattarao Kamble	92,053	41.98%	▲2.00
MNS	Rajendra Waman Najardhane	7,061	3.22%	▲2.70
Independent	Vijayrao Yadavrao Khadse	2,881	1.31%	New
VBA	Taterao Maroti Hanwate	1,875	0.86%	▼2.44
Independent	Kewate Vidwan Shamrao	1,413	0.64%	New
NOTA	None of the Above	654	0.30%	▼0.47
Margin of victory		16,629	7.58%	▲2.83
Turnout		219,919	69.29%	▲2.21
Total valid votes		219,265		
Registered electors		317,398		▲8.15
BJP hold		Swing	▲4.83	

=== Assembly Election 2019 ===
2019 Maharashtra Legislative Assembly election : Umarkhed
Party	Candidate	Votes	%	±%
BJP	Namdev Jayram Sasane	87,337	44.74%	▼3.65
INC	Vijayrao Yadavrao Khadse	78,050	39.98%	▲17.65
Independent	Dr. Vinkare Vishwanath Umaji	18,248	9.35%	New
VBA	Pramod Motiram Duthade	6,433	3.30%	New
NOTA	None of the Above	1,497	0.77%	▲0.17
BSP	Prof. Minakshi A. Savalkar	1,213	0.62%	▲0.03
Margin of victory		9,287	4.76%	▼21.30
Turnout		196,847	67.07%	▼0.17
Total valid votes		195,219		
Registered electors		293,480		▲5.88
BJP hold		Swing	▼3.65	

=== Assembly Election 2014 ===
2014 Maharashtra Legislative Assembly election : Umarkhed
Party	Candidate	Votes	%	±%
BJP	Rajendra Waman Najardhane	90,190	48.39%	▲8.95
INC	Vijayrao Yadavrao Khadse	41,614	22.33%	▼22.00
SS	Shivshankar Shrawan Pandhare	24,619	13.21%	New
NCP	Mohanrao Vitthalrao More	19,047	10.22%	New
BMP	Kamble Gajanan Arajun	1,464	0.79%	New
BBM	Nana Sirsat	1,167	0.63%	New
NOTA	None of the Above	1,119	0.60%	New
Margin of victory		48,576	26.06%	▲21.17
Turnout		187,619	67.69%	▲4.90
Total valid votes		186,394		
Registered electors		277,187		▲14.53
BJP gain from INC		Swing	▲4.06	

=== Assembly Election 2009 ===
2009 Maharashtra Legislative Assembly election : Umarkhed
Party	Candidate	Votes	%	±%
INC	Vijayrao Yadavrao Khadse	66,882	44.32%	▲19.16
BJP	Rajendra Waman Najardhane	59,507	39.44%	▲4.19
Independent	Gaikwad Vitthal Purbhaji	9,738	6.45%	New
BSP	Kamble Suryabhan Waghuji	2,247	1.49%	▼7.84
Independent	Babusha Allis Baburao Sudam Manvar	1,037	0.69%	New
Prabuddha Republican Party	Kamble Uttam Bhagaji	1,023	0.68%	New
Independent	Padamgirwar Murlidhar Shankarrao	997	0.66%	New
Margin of victory		7,375	4.89%	▼5.19
Turnout		150,939	62.37%	▼7.78
Total valid votes		150,897		
Registered electors		242,024		▲14.71
INC gain from BJP		Swing	▲9.08	

=== Assembly Election 2004 ===
2004 Maharashtra Legislative Assembly election : Umarkhed
Party	Candidate	Votes	%	±%
BJP	Uttam Raghoji Ingle	52,143	35.24%	▲6.72
INC	Adv. Anantrao Apparao Deosarkar	37,234	25.17%	▼10.11
BSP	Dr. Vijay Motiram Rathod	13,807	9.33%	New
SP	Mahadaji Dhondirao Kadam	9,565	6.46%	New
Independent	Jagirdar Sanaulla Amanulla	8,435	5.70%	New
Independent	Dattadigambar Shrikrushna Wankhede	6,049	4.09%	New
CPI(M)	Dhanusing Bhivsing Naik (Pawar)	4,265	2.88%	New
Margin of victory		14,909	10.08%	▲7.06
Turnout		147,953	70.13%	▲1.42
Total valid votes		147,951		
Registered electors		210,981		▲25.73
BJP gain from INC		Swing	▼0.03	

=== Assembly Election 1999 ===
1999 Maharashtra Legislative Assembly election : Umarkhed
Party	Candidate	Votes	%	±%
INC	Adv. Anantrao Apparao Deosarkar	40,668	35.28%	▲14.33
NCP	Prakash Patil Deosarkar	37,190	32.26%	New
BJP	Ingale Uttam Raghoji	32,878	28.52%	▼4.72
Independent	Bhaskar Keshao Mamidwar (Bhaskar Mama)	3,799	3.30%	New
Independent	Devidas Mude	751	0.65%	New
Margin of victory		3,478	3.02%	▼9.27
Turnout		123,370	73.52%	▼8.24
Total valid votes		115,286		
Registered electors		167,800		▼4.28
INC gain from BJP		Swing	▲2.04	

=== Assembly Election 1995 ===
1995 Maharashtra Legislative Assembly election : Umarkhed
Party	Candidate	Votes	%	±%
BJP	Ingale Uttamrao Raghoji	44,826	33.23%	▲24.32
INC	Adv. Anantrao Deosarkar	28,248	20.94%	▼17.52
Independent	Prakash Patil Deosarkar	19,530	14.48%	New
BBM	Rathod Gokuldas Devising	15,511	11.50%	New
JD	Dr. Mohammad Nadim	11,681	8.66%	▼39.79
Independent	K. D. Jadhav	3,860	2.86%	New
Independent	Patil Narayanrao Bhimrao	1,541	1.14%	New
Margin of victory		16,578	12.29%	▲2.30
Turnout		137,978	78.71%	▲12.35
Total valid votes		134,878		
Registered electors		175,300		▲15.85
BJP gain from JD		Swing	▼15.22	

=== Assembly Election 1990 ===
1990 Maharashtra Legislative Assembly election : Umarkhed
Party	Candidate	Votes	%	±%
JD	Prakash Patil Deosarkar	47,351	48.45%	New
INC	Balasaheb Vitthalrao Deshmukh	37,586	38.46%	▼9.71
BJP	Rajusingh Chudaman Rathod	8,708	8.91%	New
RPI	Dhule Bapurao Sambhaji	1,090	1.12%	▲0.53
Independent	Daoo Madhukar Narayan	999	1.02%	New
Margin of victory		9,765	9.99%	▲3.98
Turnout		99,426	65.71%	▼4.84
Total valid votes		97,729		
Registered electors		151,310		▲22.72
JD gain from INC		Swing	▲0.28	

=== Assembly Election 1985 ===
1985 Maharashtra Legislative Assembly election : Umarkhed
Party	Candidate	Votes	%	±%
INC	Bhimrao Apparao Deshmukh	41,236	48.17%	New
IC(S)	Adv. Anantrao Apparao Deosarkar	36,092	42.16%	New
Independent	Athawale Narayanrao Laxmanrao	6,885	8.04%	New
Margin of victory		5,144	6.01%	▼9.13
Turnout		86,992	70.56%	▲3.60
Total valid votes		85,601		
Registered electors		123,295		▲13.61
INC gain from INC(I)		Swing	▼8.80	

=== Assembly Election 1980 ===
1980 Maharashtra Legislative Assembly election : Umarkhed
Party	Candidate	Votes	%	±%
INC(I)	Trimbakrao Gopalrao Deshmukh	40,699	56.97%	▲38.37
INC(U)	Adv. Anantrao Apparao Deosarkar	29,882	41.83%	New
Independent	Ramchandra Vishveshwar Joshi	856	1.20%	New
Margin of victory		10,817	15.14%	▲3.72
Turnout		72,699	66.99%	▼12.15
Total valid votes		71,437		
Registered electors		108,522		▲7.38
INC(I) gain from INC		Swing	▲12.81	

=== Assembly Election 1978 ===
1978 Maharashtra Legislative Assembly election : Umarkhed
Party	Candidate	Votes	%	±%
INC	Adv. Anantrao Apparao Deosarkar	34,805	44.16%	▼8.33
JP	Jahagirdar M. Amanulla M. Ibadulla	25,803	32.74%	New
INC(I)	Trimbakrao Gopalrao Deshmukh	14,657	18.60%	New
PWPI	Keshaorao Anandrao Deosarkar	2,360	2.99%	New
Independent	Shankarrao Sambhuji Khandare	1,186	1.50%	New
Margin of victory		9,002	11.42%	▼4.22
Turnout		80,875	80.02%	▲8.35
Total valid votes		78,811		
Registered electors		101,067		▲16.93
INC hold		Swing	▼8.33	

=== Assembly Election 1972 ===
1972 Maharashtra Legislative Assembly election : Umarkhed
Party	Candidate	Votes	%	±%
INC	Shankarrao Ajaji Mane	31,589	52.49%	▼7.77
Independent	Raghunath Anant Deshmukh	22,175	36.85%	New
Independent	Chandusing Amarsing Naik	2,791	4.64%	New
Independent	Tulsidas Yogaji Paikrao	1,585	2.63%	New
RPI	Jalbarao Krushnaji Rokade	1,344	2.23%	▼5.65
ABJS	Ghatge Rangrao Shamrao	636	1.06%	▼2.96
Margin of victory		9,414	15.64%	▼25.86
Turnout		61,972	71.70%	▲4.97
Total valid votes		60,182		
Registered electors		86,434		▲18.57
INC hold		Swing	▼7.77	

=== Assembly Election 1967 ===
1967 Maharashtra Legislative Assembly election : Umarkhed
Party	Candidate	Votes	%	±%
INC	Shankarrao Ajaji Mane	28,402	60.26%	▼2.7
Independent	Keshaorao Anandrao Deosarkar	8,840	18.76%	New
Independent	G. Momohale	4,063	8.62%	New
RPI	B. R. Lokhande	3,715	7.88%	▼7.25
ABJS	N. S. Pande	1,892	4.01%	New
Margin of victory		19,562	41.51%	▲0.44
Turnout		52,274	71.71%	▼7.00
Total valid votes		47,130		
Registered electors		72,896		▲18.53
INC hold		Swing	▼2.70	

=== Assembly Election 1962 ===
1962 Maharashtra Legislative Assembly election : Umarkhed
Party	Candidate	Votes	%	±%
INC	Ramchandra Namdeo Shingankar	27,748	62.97%	New
Independent	Vishwasrao Sukaji Kambale	9,653	21.90%	New
RPI	Sahebrao Kisanrao Sirsat	6,667	15.13%	New
Margin of victory		18,095	41.06%	
Turnout		46,552	75.69%	
Total valid votes		44,068		
Registered electors		61,502		
INC win (new seat)				
