= Jawala Bazar, Hingoli =

Jawala Bazar
- Village
- Location in Maharashtra, India
- Coordinates: 19°27′50″N 76°59′10″E
- Country: India
- State: Maharashtra
- District: Hingoli

Government
  - Type: Gram panchayat

Population (2011)
  - Total: 13,219
- Demonym: Jawalkar

Languages
  - Official: Marathi
- Time zone: UTC+5:30 (IST)
- PIN: 431705
- Telephone code: 02456
- Vehicle registration: MH-38

Jawala Bazar is a major town in Aundha Nagnath tehsil of Hingoli district in Maharashtra state of India.

== Demography ==
The 2011 Census of India recorded the population of Jawala Bazar as being 2526 households comprising a total of 13,219, of which 6,698 were males while 6,521 were females. The Average Sex Ratio was 974, which was higher than the Maharashtra state average of 929. The literacy rate was 80.53%, compared to 82.34% across the state. Male literacy rate was 87.64% and the female literacy rate was 73.31%. Schedule Castes constituted 8.84% of the population and Schedule Tribes were 3.92%.
