= Subhash Bapurao Wankhede =

Indian politician

Subhash Wankhede

Member of Parliament, Lok Sabha
- In office (2009–2014)
- Preceded by: Suryakanta Patil
- Succeeded by: Rajiv Satav
- Constituency: Hingoli

Member of Legislative Assembly of Maharashtra
- In office (1995-1999), (1999-2004), (2004 – 2009)
- Preceded by: Bapurao Shivram Patil Shinde Ashtikar
- Succeeded by: Jawalgaonkar Madhavrao Nivruttirao Patil
- Constituency: Hadgaon

Personal details
- Born: 4 January 1963 (age 63) At.Lyahari, Tq.Hadgaon, Nanded District
- Party: Shivsena
- Other political affiliations: Shivsena
- Spouse: Smt.Anita Wankhede
- Children: Son-1 & Daughter-2
- Parent: Bapurao Santukrao Wankhede (father)
- Education: 10th Pass at Zilla Parishad School, Hadgaon 1985
- Occupation: Farming & Business

Subhash Bapurao Wankhede (born 4 January 1963) is an Indian politician and a member of the Shivsena political party. He was the member of the 15th Lok Sabha of India and represents the Hingoli constituency in Maharashtra state. He joined Shiv Sena on 20 July 2022.
