= Santosh Kautika Tarfe =

Indian politician

Dr. Santosh Tarfe

Member of Maharashtra Legislative Assembly
- In office 2014–2019
- Preceded by: Rajeev Satav
- Succeeded by: Santosh Bangar
- Constituency: Kalamnuri

Personal details
- Born: 12 June 1976 (age 50) Kalamnuri, Hingoli District
- Party: Shiv Sena (Nov 2026-Present)
- Other political affiliations: Shiv Sena(UBT) (2022-2026); Indian National Congress (Before 2022)
- Spouse: Vandanatai Tarfe
- Relatives: Adv. Shivajirao Moghe (Father-in-Law)
- Education: Graduate Professional M.B.B.S. Governement Medical College, Aurangabad, -1999-2000, D.C.H. College of physicians and surgeons, Mumbai-2006-07
- Occupation: Medical Profession & Agriculture

Santosh Kautika Tarfe is a member of the 13th Maharashtra Legislative Assembly from Indian National Congress (INC). He was made MLA by Rajeev Satav after Satav became MP in 2014 He represents the Kalamnuri Assembly Constituency. He belongs to the Shiv Sena (UBT).

== Personal life ==
He is the son in law of Shivajirao Moghe, a former Member of the Legislative Assembly and senior leader of the Indian National Congress party.

== Career ==
He has been president of Maharashtra State Tribal Youth Welfare Organisation. He joined the INC in February, 2012.

== Controversy ==
In September 2013, case was filed against Tarfe for abetting suicide of a tribal Raju Munjaji Vibhute (aged 23), son of RTI activist Munjaji Vibhute, belonging to Brahman Wadi, of Aundha Nagnath Taluka, Hingoli district, on a complaint filed by his widow. He was absconding in police records according to a news report dated 12 September 2013.
