= Aundha Nagnath =

Aundha Nagnath Aundha
- Temple
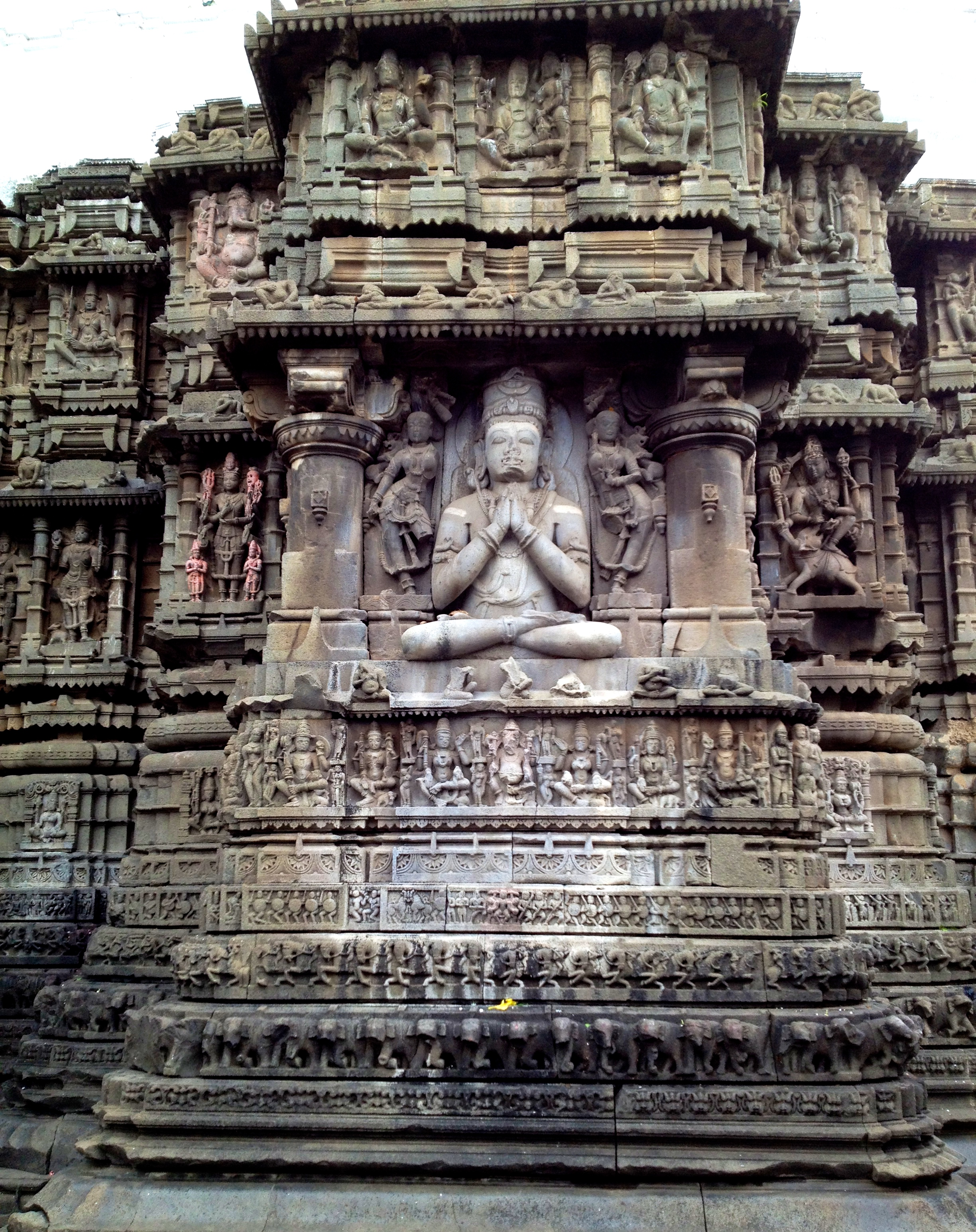
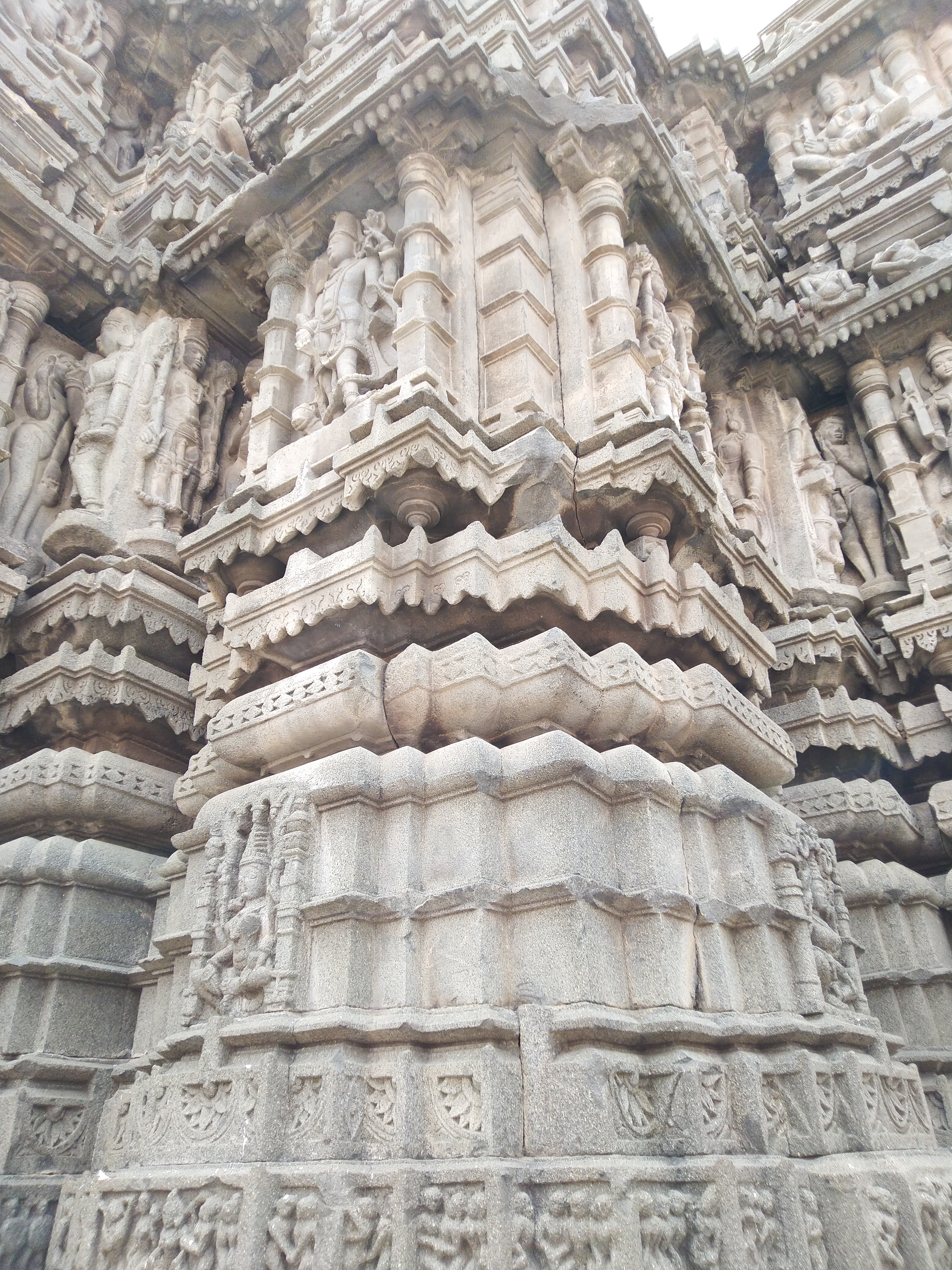
- Aundha Nagnath Temple
- Nickname: Nageshwar jyotirling
- Interactive map of Aundha Nagnath
- Coordinates: 19.534554°N 77.039566°E
- Country: India
- State: Maharashtra
- District: Hingoli

Population (2011)
  - Total: 14,801
- Demonym: Aundhekar

Languages
  - Official: Marathi
- Time zone: UTC+5:30 (IST)
- Postal code: 431705
- Vehicle registration: MH 38
- Lok Sabha Constituency: Hingoli
- Assembly Constituency: Basmath
- Website: aundhanagnathmahaulb.maharashtra.gov.in/en

Aundha Naganath is a town in the Hingoli district of the Maharashtra state in India. The town is known for the Aundha Nagnath Temple, a Hindu temple. The town is also known for the Siddheshwar Dam, which is about 15 km away from the city in the western direction. It is the proposed site for the LIGO-India Project, a planned gravitational wave detector that lies 12 km away from the town. After its scheduled completion in 2024, this research facility will be the fifth such facility after Hanford, Washington, Livingston, Louisiana in the USA, Virgo in Italy and KAGRA in Japan.

== Geography ==
Aundha Nagnath rests on the Deccan Trap in the Marathwada region of Maharashtra. The Aundha Lake is situated on the southern side is the major source of water for the town.

== Demography ==
As per the 2011 census, Aundha has a total of 2744 families residing. The town has a population of 14801 of which 7515 were males while 7286 were females. The literacy rate of the town was 82.33% about the same as the 82.34% of Maharashtra. Male literacy stands at 89.45% while the female literacy rate was 74.98%. Schedule Caste (SC) constitutes 15.57% while Schedule Tribe (ST) were 2.70% of total population.

== Transportation ==
- By Air: Aurangabad is the nearest international airport which is about 210 km away from the town. Also, Nanded national airport, which is about 70 km away connects to the town.
- By Rail: Chondi station, around 21 km away from the town serves as the nearest railway station. While Hingoli and Parbhani Junctions are well connected throughout the country's major cities such as Mumbai, Hyderabad, Delhi, Chennai, Vijaywada, Kolkata, etc.
- By Road: Aundha Nagnath is a major bus stop where all en-route buses halt. This bus stop is well connected to the major cities and regions of Maharashtra. There are daily luxury buses operating to Mumbai, Thane, Kolhapur, Nagpur, Nanded, Aurangabad, Nashik, Akola, Solapur, Latur, etc.

== Governance ==
As per Constitution of India and Panchyati Raj Act, Aundha Nagnath is administrated by Nagaradhyaksha (Head of Village) who is elected by the representatives of the village. The town falls under the Basamath Assembly Constituency for the Assembly Elections of Maharashtra. At present, this constituency is being represented by MLA Rajubhaiya Nawghare, who belongs to the Nationalist Congress Party. Aundha Nagnath region falls under the Hingoli Parliamentary Constituency for the Parliamentary Elections of India. At present, this constituency is being represented by MP Hemant Patil, who belongs to the Shiv Sena.

== Connectivity ==
- Nearest city: Hingoli, a major religious and commercial centre in the region.
- Nearest railway station: Parbhani railway station, with regular services to Mumbai, Hyderabad, Nagpur, and other cities.
- Nearest airport: Nanded Airport, approximately 88 km away, offering regional air services.
- Highways: The town lies on National Highway 361, providing road connectivity to Hingoli, Parbhani, and Nanded.

== Other Jyotirlinga In Maharashtra ==
- Jyotirlinga
- Grishneshwar Temple
- Trimbakeshwar Shiva Temple
- Bhimashankar Temple
- Vaidyanath Temple
