= Siddheshwar Dam =

- Location within Maharashtra
- Official name: Siddheshwar Dam D03206
- Location: Siddeshwar
- Coordinates: 19.5905434°N 76.9560702°E
- Opening date: 1968
- Owners: Government of Maharashtra, India

Dam and spillways
- Type of dam: Earthfill
- Impounds: Purna river
- Height: 38.26 m (125.5 ft)
- Length: 6,353.2 m (20,844 ft)
- Dam volume: 0.9072 million cubic meters

Reservoir
- Creates: Siddheshwar
- Total capacity: 0.251 km^{3} (0.060 cu mi)
- Surface area: 40.58 km^{2} (15.67 sq mi)

Siddheshwar Dam is an earth-fill dam on Purna River, which is a tributary of River Godavari. This dam is located in the north-western part of Aundha Nagnath, in the Hingoli district of Maharashtra, India.

The dam was constructed in the era of Yashwantrao Chavan, the former chief minister of Maharashtra State. The dam serves the purpose of irrigation for Aundha Nagnath and Basmath tehsils of Hingoli. It also provides drinking water to nearby cities such as Nanded and Basmath.

The proposed site for Light Interferometer Gravitational Observatory (LIGO-India) is nearly 6 km away from the dam.

== Specifications ==
The height of the dam above lowest foundation is 38.26 metres (125.5 ft), while the length is 6,353.2 m (20,844 ft). The gross storage capacity is 0.251 km^{3} (0.060 cu mi) and live storage capacity is 0.081 km^{3} (0.019 cu mi). It is also known as Rupur camp.

== Purpose ==
- Irrigation

== See also ==
- Dams in Maharashtra
- Godavari River Basin Irrigation Projects
- List of reservoirs and dams in India
