= Pankanergaon =

Village in Maharashtra

Coordinates: 19°53′N 76°50′E

Pankanergaon is a village in the Sengaon tehsil of Hingoli district, in the Indian state of Maharashtra. It has a population of nearly 10,000 and is easily accessible as it is on the main route between Hingoli and Washim. Most of the population are involved in agriculture. The main religion is Hindu but there are also some Jains, Muslims and Buddhists.

The village has an ancient temple dedicated to Shiva where every year people celebrate the festival of Mahashivaratri. There is a recently built Jain temple in the village and a temple of Devi on the outskirts.

The village has a small government school for standards 1–10. The people are not much interested in education with very few being educated or working away from home. Most are traditional farmers or work in poorly paid jobs because of their lack of education.

== The economy ==
As two tehsils are within ten kilometers, there are only a few shops in the village. These include two or three clothing stores, about ten grocer's shops and some jewelers, electrical stores, wood, welding and metal works. A market is held every Friday and is well attended by farmers and traders. For most of the population it is the main source of their everyday needs. Some farmers take their produce to other nearby weekly markets to earn some revenue.

The village has a Grampanchayat office, a Bharat Sanchar Nigam Limited sub centre and two banks. Water reserves are one of major problem of the village as there is no river or dam in the vicinity and in summer people struggle to find enough water for their daily needs, But nowadays Jalswarajya yojna brings a lot change in water problem.

Nowadays some modernisation is going on. Politics has arrived in the village and there are some good opportunities for new and young people. The place is beginning to develop as the young people are trying out new ventures and opportunities. There is also a greater awareness of the importance of education. New technologies have arrived including the cell phone and this has increased possible sources of employment and revenue.
