= Sengaon =

Village in Maharashtra

- town
- Location in Maharashtra, India
- Coordinates: 19.7929568°N 76.8865015°E
- Country: India
- State: Maharashtra
- District: Hingoli

Population (2011)
  - Total: 18,455
- Demonym: Sengaonkar

Languages
  - Official: Marathi
- Time zone: UTC+5:30 (IST)
- Postal code: 431542
- Vehicle registration: MH 38
- Lok Sabha constituency: Hingoli

Sengaon is a town and a nagarpanchayat in Hingoli subdivision of the Hingoli district, in the Indian state of Maharashtra. It is the holy place of Saint Appaswami Maharaj.Pusegaon is very important and economically main region of taluka. It is located on the bank of Kayadhu River which continues in Purna and then Godavari River. Sengaon is surrounded by range of Hingoli hills. 'Amli Bars' and 'Bhulabai' are festivals celebrated in this region.

== Demography ==
- As per 2011 census, Sengaon has total 1,708 families residing. The town has population of 8,455 of which 4,449 were males while 4,046 were females.
- Average Sex Ratio of town was 918 which is lower than Maharashtra state average of 929.
- Literacy rate of town was 81.76% compared to 82.34% of Maharashtra. Male literacy stands at 90% while female literacy rate was 74%.
- Schedule Caste (SC) constitutes 17.5% while Schedule Tribe (ST) were 2.1% of total population.
