= Kalamnuri Assembly constituency =

Constituency of the Maharashtra legislative assembly in India

Coordinates: 19.68°N 77.31°E

Kalamnuri
- Constituency No. 93 for the Maharashtra Legislative Assembly

Constituency details
- Country: India
- Region: Western India
- State: Maharashtra
- District: Hingoli
- Lok Sabha constituency: Hingoli
- Established: 1962
- Total electors: 330,941
- Reservation: None

Member of Legislative Assembly
- 15th Maharashtra Legislative Assembly
- Incumbent Santosh Bangar
- Party: SHS
- Alliance: NDA
- Elected year: 2024

Kalamnuri Assembly constituency is one of the 288 constituencies of Maharashtra Vidhan Sabha and one of the three located in the Hingoli district.

It is a part of the Hingoli Lok Sabha constituency along with five other Vidhan Sabha constituencies, viz Basmath and Hingoli from the Hingoli district and Umarkhed (SC) from the Yavatmal district and Kinwat and Hatgaon from the Nanded district.

== Members of Legislative assembly ==
Year	Member	Party
1962	Surajmal Marauam	Indian National Congress
1967	V. N. Chinchordikar	Communist Party of India
1972	Vitthalrao Maske Naik	Communist Party of India (Marxist)
1978	Vitthalrao Maske Naik	Communist Party of India (Marxist)
1980	Adv. Rajani Shankarrao Satav	Indian National Congress (I)
1985	Adv. Rajani Shankarrao Satav	Indian National Congress
1990	Marotrao Shinde	Shiv Sena
1995	Vitthalrao Maske Naik	Communist Party of India
1999	Gajananrao Ghuge	Shiv Sena
2004	Gajananrao Ghuge	Shiv Sena
2009	Rajeev Satav	Indian National Congress
2014	Santosh Tarfe	Indian National Congress
2019	Santosh Bangar	Shiv Sena
2024	Santosh Bangar	Shiv Sena

== Election results ==
=== Assembly Election 2024 ===
2024 Maharashtra Legislative Assembly election : Kalamnuri
Party	Candidate	Votes	%	±%
SS	Santosh Bangar	122,016	49.75%	▲10.48
SS(UBT)	Dr. Santosh Kautika Tarfe	90,933	37.08%	New
VBA	Dr. Dilip Maske (Naik)	18,259	7.44%	▼24.03
Independent	Ajit Magar	4,212	1.72%	New
Independent	Tarfe Santosh Laxman	1,966	0.80%	New
NOTA	None of the Above	432	0.18%	▼0.42
Margin of victory		31,083	12.67%	▲4.88
Turnout		2,45,685	74.24%	▲5.33
Total valid votes		2,45,253		
Registered electors		3,30,941		▲8.33
SS hold		Swing	▲10.48	

=== Assembly Election 2019 ===
2019 Maharashtra Legislative Assembly election : Kalamnuri
Party	Candidate	Votes	%	±%
SS	Santosh Bangar	82,515	39.27%	▲9.94
VBA	Ajit Magar	66,137	31.48%	New
INC	Dr. Santosh Kautika Tarfe	57,544	27.39%	▼7.41
NOTA	None of the Above	1,247	0.59%	▼0.02
Margin of victory		16,378	7.80%	▲2.33
Turnout		2,11,420	69.20%	▲0.69
Total valid votes		2,10,107		
Registered electors		3,05,506		▲7.87
SS gain from INC		Swing	▲4.47	

=== Assembly Election 2014 ===
2014 Maharashtra Legislative Assembly election : Kalamnuri
Party	Candidate	Votes	%	±%
INC	Dr. Santosh Kautika Tarfe	67,104	34.80%	▼5.66
SS	Gajanan Vitthalrao Ghuge	56,568	29.34%	▼6.21
NCP	Shivaji Mane	38,085	19.75%	New
RSPS	Adv. Madhavrao Naik	17,474	9.06%	New
BSP	Dr.Dilip Maske (Naik)	8,032	4.17%	▼11.28
MNS	Adkine Sunil Madhavrao	1,623	0.84%	▼0.20
NOTA	None of the Above	1,192	0.62%	New
Margin of victory		10,536	5.46%	▲0.56
Turnout		1,94,132	68.54%	▲0.02
Total valid votes		1,92,818		
Registered electors		2,83,223		▲15.01
INC hold		Swing	▼5.66	

=== Assembly Election 2009 ===
2009 Maharashtra Legislative Assembly election : Kalamnuri
Party	Candidate	Votes	%	±%
INC	Rajeev Satav	67,804	40.46%	New
SS	Gajanan Vitthalrao Ghuge	59,577	35.55%	▼14.31
BSP	Dr. Santosh Kautika Tarfe	25,893	15.45%	▲10.85
Shivrajya Party	Dr. Santosh Sadashivrao Bondhare	3,947	2.36%	▲1.75
CPI(M)	Vitthalrao Maske Naik	3,547	2.12%	▼5.37
MNS	Bandu Alias Pramod Sakharam Kute	1,738	1.04%	New
Independent	Mohammed Mujim Ansari	1,694	1.01%	New
Margin of victory		8,227	4.91%	▼11.64
Turnout		1,67,592	68.06%	▼0.55
Total valid votes		1,67,592		
Registered electors		2,46,252		▲16.64
INC gain from SS		Swing	▼9.40	

=== Assembly Election 2004 ===
2004 Maharashtra Legislative Assembly election : Kalamnuri
Party	Candidate	Votes	%	±%
SS	Ghuge Gajanan Vitthalrao	72,221	49.86%	▲19.79
NCP	Ramrao Sakharam Wadkute	48,248	33.31%	▲4.37
CPI(M)	Vitthalrao Maske Naik	10,846	7.49%	▲0.78
BSP	Vasant Kishan Paikrao	6,667	4.60%	New
Independent	Panjab Baliram Wadhave	2,811	1.94%	New
Prabuddha Republican Party	Uttamrao Dagduji Bhagat	1,085	0.75%	New
Shivrajya Party	Vilas Anandrao Patil	876	0.60%	New
Margin of victory		23,973	16.55%	▲15.42
Turnout		1,44,888	68.63%	▲9.01
Total valid votes		1,44,859		
Registered electors		2,11,128		▲18.55
SS hold		Swing	▲19.79	

=== Assembly Election 1999 ===
1999 Maharashtra Legislative Assembly election : Kalamnuri
Party	Candidate	Votes	%	±%
SS	Ghuge Gajanan Vitthalrao	31,914	30.07%	▲0.30
NCP	Rajanitai Shankarrao Satav	30,717	28.94%	New
BBM	Yogiraj Bhojaji Rathod	17,162	16.17%	New
CPI(M)	Vitthalrao Maske Naik	7,115	6.70%	▼29.78
Independent	Deelip Vithalrao Deshmukh	6,860	6.46%	New
Independent	Ramrao Apparao Wagdaw	5,483	5.17%	New
Independent	Dr. Anil Keshavrao Kanhe Pimprikar	2,498	2.35%	New
Margin of victory		1,197	1.13%	▼5.59
Turnout		1,19,304	66.99%	▼12.88
Total valid votes		1,06,136		
Registered electors		1,78,087		▲3.44
SS gain from CPI(M)		Swing	▼6.42	

=== Assembly Election 1995 ===
1995 Maharashtra Legislative Assembly election : Kalamnuri
Party	Candidate	Votes	%	±%
CPI(M)	Vitthalrao Maske Naik	45,531	36.49%	▲27.39
SS	Adv. Shivaji Gyanbarao Mane	37,144	29.77%	▼0.23
Independent	Ganeshrao Kishanrao Balwante	10,845	8.69%	New
INC	Gangaram Harsing Jadhav	8,977	7.19%	▼18.35
Independent	Sureshrao Raosaheb Wadgaonkar	6,863	5.50%	New
Independent	Begaji Sambhaji Gawande	5,196	4.16%	New
JD	Prof. F. M. Shinde	2,538	2.03%	▼4.74
Margin of victory		8,387	6.72%	▲2.27
Turnout		1,29,244	75.07%	▲8.73
Total valid votes		1,24,782		
Registered electors		1,72,172		▲4.15
CPI(M) gain from SS		Swing	▲6.49	

=== Assembly Election 1990 ===
1990 Maharashtra Legislative Assembly election : Kalamnuri
Party	Candidate	Votes	%	±%
SS	Maratrao Parasram Shinde	31,615	30.00%	New
INC	Rajeev Satav	26,924	25.55%	▼15.13
BRP	Anand Madhavrao Nerlikar	13,768	13.06%	New
Independent	Ramrao Apparao Wagdav	13,423	12.74%	New
CPI(M)	Vitthalrao Maske Naik	9,587	9.10%	▼11.74
JD	Pole Dattarao Maratrao Naik	7,138	6.77%	New
Independent	Gyanuji Ganpati Mirashi	703	0.67%	New
Margin of victory		4,691	4.45%	▼15.39
Turnout		1,07,811	65.21%	▲18.23
Total valid votes		1,05,383		
Registered electors		1,65,317		▲27.32
SS gain from INC		Swing	▼10.68	

=== Assembly Election 1985 ===
1985 Maharashtra Legislative Assembly election : Kalamnuri
Party	Candidate	Votes	%	±%
INC	Adv. Rajani Shankarrao Satav	24,042	40.68%	New
CPI(M)	Vitthalrao Maske Naik	12,317	20.84%	▼2.42
IC(S)	Mitradev Kondbarao Patil	9,476	16.03%	New
Independent	Randhir Shrawan Telgote	8,408	14.23%	New
Independent	Ganeshrao Bajirao Dhale	1,655	2.80%	New
Independent	Ramrao Harsingh Rathod	1,292	2.19%	New
Independent	Govindrao Dhulbarao Mule	1,050	1.78%	New
Margin of victory		11,725	19.84%	▲3.24
Turnout		60,923	46.92%	▼2.99
Total valid votes		59,103		
Registered electors		1,29,842		▲8.72
INC gain from INC(I)		Swing	▲0.82	

=== Assembly Election 1980 ===
1980 Maharashtra Legislative Assembly election : Kalamnuri
Party	Candidate	Votes	%	±%
INC(I)	Adv. Rajani Shankarrao Satav	23,088	39.85%	▲31.61
CPI(M)	Vitthalrao Maske Naik	13,475	23.26%	▼35.99
INC(U)	Mitradev Kondbarao Bhise	11,767	20.31%	New
Independent	Nerlikar Madhawrao Deorao	9,601	16.57%	New
Margin of victory		9,613	16.59%	▼14.57
Turnout		59,460	49.79%	▼9.60
Total valid votes		57,931		
Registered electors		1,19,425		▲8.47
INC(I) gain from CPI(M)		Swing	▼19.40	

=== Assembly Election 1978 ===
1978 Maharashtra Legislative Assembly election : Kalamnuri
Party	Candidate	Votes	%	±%
CPI(M)	Maske Vithlrao Champatrao Naik	37,911	59.25%	▲12.75
INC	Deshmukh Shiwajirao Shankarrao	17,972	28.09%	▼13.20
INC(I)	Dukare Baburao Gangaram	5,278	8.25%	New
Independent	Narwade Gangadhar Satwa	2,823	4.41%	New
Margin of victory		19,939	31.16%	▲25.95
Turnout		66,922	60.78%	▲18.49
Total valid votes		63,984		
Registered electors		1,10,103		▲11.36
CPI(M) hold		Swing	▲12.75	

=== Assembly Election 1972 ===
1972 Maharashtra Legislative Assembly election : Kalamnuri
Party	Candidate	Votes	%	±%
CPI(M)	Maske Vithlrao Champatrao Naik	18,217	46.50%	New
INC	Kalmkar B Rao G Rao	16,176	41.29%	▲2.09
RPI	Kaitare Pandit Badri	2,758	7.04%	New
Independent	Govinda Sanjoba	1,303	3.33%	New
INC(O)	Sakale Gulabsa Maniksa	722	1.84%	New
Margin of victory		2,041	5.21%	▼8.09
Turnout		40,915	41.38%	▼15.97
Total valid votes		39,176		
Registered electors		98,870		▲11.49
CPI(M) gain from CPI		Swing	▼6.00	

=== Assembly Election 1967 ===
1967 Maharashtra Legislative Assembly election : Kalamnuri
Party	Candidate	Votes	%	±%
CPI	V. N. Chinchordikar	25,882	52.50%	New
INC	K. H. Sawant	19,324	39.20%	▼20.32
Independent	K. H. Nagoji	1,570	3.18%	New
Independent	P. D. Kaluji	1,269	2.57%	New
Independent	N. K. Pandit	1,255	2.55%	New
Margin of victory		6,558	13.30%	▼18.24
Turnout		54,788	61.78%	▲13.52
Total valid votes		49,300		
Registered electors		88,680		▲33.25
CPI gain from INC		Swing	▼7.01	

=== Assembly Election 1962 ===
1962 Maharashtra Legislative Assembly election : Kalamnuri
Party	Candidate	Votes	%	±%
INC	Surajmal Marauam	16,663	59.51%	New
Independent	Pandit Badrinath	7,831	27.97%	New
Independent	Shankar Nagorao	1,243	4.44%	New
Independent	Ganpat Nagoji	1,129	4.03%	New
Independent	Sakharam Laxman	828	2.96%	New
Margin of victory		8,832	31.54%	
Turnout		30,038	45.14%	
Total valid votes		27,999		
Registered electors		66,550		
INC win (new seat)				

== See also ==
Kalamnuri
