= Vilasrao =

Vilasrao is a name. People with the name include:

- Vilasrao Deshmukh
- Vilasrao Narayan Jagtap
- Vilasrao Gundewar
- Vilasrao Baburaoji Muttemwar
- Ritesh Vilasrao Deshmukh
- Amit Vilasrao Deshmukh

== See also ==
- List of Ministers under Vilasrao Deshmukh
