= Akhada Balapur =

- Village
- Location in Maharashtra, India
- Coordinates: 19.47964°N 77.35329°E
- Country: India
- State: Maharashtra
- District: Hingoli

Government
  - Type: Gram panchayat

Population (2011)
  - Total: 12,505
- Demonym: Balapurkar

Languages
  - Official: Marathi
- Time zone: UTC+5:30 (IST)
- PIN: 431701
- Telephone code: 02456
- Vehicle registration: MH-38

Akhada Balapur is a major village in Kalamnuri tehsil of Hingoli district in Maharashtra state of India.

== Demography ==
- As per 2011 census, Balapur has a total of 2506 families residing. The village has a population of 12,505 of which 6,495 were males while 6,010 were females.
- Average sex ratio of Balapur village is 925, which is lesser than the Maharashtra state average of 929.
- Literacy rate of Balapur village was 82.34% compared to 82.95% of Maharashtra. Male literacy rate was 89.67% while female literacy rate was 75.08%.
- Schedule Caste (SC) constitutes 18.28% while Schedule Tribe (ST) were 7.22% of total population.
