= Jaipur, Hingoli =

Village in Maharashtra

Jaipur is a village in Hingoli district, Maharashtra, India. It belongs to the Marathwada region. It is located 47 km west of Hingoli and 540 km from the state capital Mumbai. The village is small, 27 square km having a population near about 9000 living and 2000 households.

The village is known for its Esai Mata Temple. Most of the Peoples living this village belong to the Jire Mali Samaj.
