= Chandrakant Ramkrishna Patil =

Indian social worker and agriculturalist

Chandrakant Patil
- Constituency: Hingoli

Chandrakant Ramkrishna Patil (1 July 1921 – 16 October 1985) was an Indian social worker and agriculturalist who served as the 6th Lok Sabha member from Hingoli as the Janata Party Candidate.

Patil was son of Shri Ramkrishan Patil from Goregaon dist. Hingoli. He was educated at Shree Ganesh Vidhya Mandir School in Indore up to matriculation. He was married to Smt. Malti Patil, 1940 and had 2 sons and 2 daughters.

Patil was previously associated with the Socialist Party. He was Chairman of Panchayat Samiti during 1972–77. He was elected to Maharashtra Legislative Assembly during 1967—72 from Hingoli.
