= Uttam Rathod =

Indian politician (born 1928)

Uttamrao Rathod

Member of Parliament, Lok Sabha
- In office 1980–1991
- Preceded by: Chandrakant Patil
- Succeeded by: Vilasrao Gundewar
- Constituency: Hingoli, Maharashtra

Personal details
- Born: 27 July 1928 Mandvi, Nanded District, Bombay Presidency, British India
- Party: Indian National Congress

Uttamrao Baliram Rathod-Patil (born 27 July 1928) is an Indian politician belonging to the Indian National Congress. He was elected to the Lok Sabha, lower house of the Parliament of India from Hingoli, Maharashtra.
