= Santosh Bangar =

Indian politician (born 1980)

Santosh Laxmanrao Bangar

Member of the Maharashtra Legislative Assembly
- Incumbent
- Assumed office (2019-2024), (2024-Present)
- Preceded by: Santosh Kautika Tarfe
- Constituency: Kalamnuri

Personal details
- Born: 14 June 1980 (age 46) Wanjarwadi, Hingoli
- Party: Shiv Sena
- Other political affiliations: Balasahebanchi Shiv Sena (2022-2023)
- Spouse: Godavari Bangar
- Education: Class 7th Pass from Manik Memorial Aary School, Hingoli in 1994-95
- Occupation: Business & Agriculture

Santosh Laxmanrao Bangar is an Indian politician serving as a 2nd time MLA in Maharashtra Legislative Assembly from Kalamnuri Vidhan Sabha constituency. He is a Shiv Sena (2022–Present) politician from Hingoli district, Maharashtra. He won the 2024 general assembly election by a margin of 34 thousand votes. In 2017 he was appointed Shiv Sena Hingoli district president and in 2019 he was elected to Maharashtra Legislative Assembly.
