= Rajendra Najardhane =

Indian politician

Member of Maharashtra Legislative Assembly
- In office 2014–2019
- Preceded by: Vijayrao Khadse
- Succeeded by: Namdev Sasane
- Constituency: Umarkhed

Personal details
- Born: 27 May 1976 (age 49) Mahagaon, Yavatmal District, Maharashtra
- Party: Maharashtra Navnirman Sena
- Other political affiliations: Bharatiya Janata Party

Rajendra Wamanrao Najardhane alias Rajubhau is a member of the 13th Maharashtra Legislative Assembly. He represents the Umarkhed Assembly Constituency. He belongs to the Bharatiya Janata Party (BJP). He had unsuccessfully contested the 2009 Maharashtra Legislative Assembly elections on the BJP ticket but lost to Vijay Khadse of the Indian National Congress. In the 2014 election, his victory was amongst the five seats won by the BJP, that resulted in the Indian National Congress (INC) not being able to win a single seat in Yavatmal district.
