= Kalamnuri =

- city
- Location in Maharashtra, India
- Coordinates: 19.67°N 77.33°E
- Country: India
- State: Maharashtra
- District: Hingoli

Government
  - Body: Municipal council
- Elevation: 480 m (1,570 ft)

Population (2011)
  - Total: 24,784
- Demonym: Kalamnurikar

Languages
  - Official: Marathi
- Time zone: UTC+5:30 (IST)
- Vehicle registration: MH-38

Kalamnuri is a city and a municipal council in Hingoli district in the Indian state of Maharashtra. Known for 500 year old Dargah of sufi saint Hazrat Sarkar Sayyad Nooruddin Noori Shahid Chisti.

== Geography ==
Kalamnuri is located at 19.67°N 77.33°E. It has an average elevation of 480 metres (1574 feet).

== Demography ==
- As per 2011 census, Kalamnuri city has population of 24,784 of which 12,952 were males while 11,832 were females.
- Average Sex Ratio of city was 914 which is lesser than Maharashtra state average of 929.
- Literacy rate of Kalamnuri city was 85.37 % compared to 82.95 % of Maharashtra. Male literacy rate was 90.34 % while female literacy rate was 80 %.
- Schedule Caste (SC) constitutes 6.29 % while Schedule Tribe (ST) were 5 % of total population.

== Government and Administration ==
- Kalamnuri Municipal Council has total administration over 4,350 houses to which it supplies basic amenities like water and sewerage. It is also authorized to build roads within Municipal Council limits and impose taxes on properties coming under its jurisdiction.
- Kalamnuri comes under Kalamnuri assembly constituency for Assembly elections of Maharashtra. Current member of Assembly representing Kalamnuri is Santosh Bangar of Shivsena who defeated Ajit Magar of Vanchit Bahujan Aghadi in 2019 assembly elections of Maharashtra.
- Kalamnuri comes under Hingoli parliamentary constituency for parliamentary elections of India. Current representative from this area to Parliament of India is Hemant Patil of Shiv Sena. He defeated Subhash Wankhede of Indian National Congress in 2019 Indian General Elections.

== See also ==
- Akhada Balapur
