= Namdev Sasane =

Indian politician (born 1964)

Member of the Maharashtra Legislative Assembly
- In office 24 October 2019 – 23 November 2024
- Preceded by: Rajendra Waman Najardhane
- Succeeded by: Kisan Wankhede
- Constituency: Umarkhed

Personal details
- Born: 14 July 1971 (age 54) Umarkhed, Maharashtra, India
- Party: Bharatiya Janata Party
- Spouse: Smt. Anuja Sasane

Namdev Jayram Sasane is an Indian politician. He was elected to the Maharashtra Legislative Assembly from Umarkhed in the 2019 Maharashtra Legislative Assembly election as a member of Bharatiya Janata Party.
