= Hadgaon Assembly constituency =

Constituency of the Maharashtra legislative assembly in India

Coordinates: 19.49°N 77.66°E

Hadgaon
- Constituency No. 84 for the Maharashtra Legislative Assembly

Constituency details
- Country: India
- Region: Western India
- State: Maharashtra
- District: Nanded
- Lok Sabha constituency: Hingoli
- Established: 1951
- Total electors: 299,252
- Reservation: None

Member of Legislative Assembly
- 15th Maharashtra Legislative Assembly
- Incumbent Baburao Kadam
- Party: SHS
- Alliance: NDA
- Elected year: 2024

Hadgaon Assembly constituency (Hadgaon/Himayatnagar) is one of the 288 Vidhan Sabha (legislative assembly) constituencies of Maharashtra state, western India. This constituency is located in Nanded district.

== Geographical Scope ==
The delimitation of the constituency happened in 2008. It comprises Himayatnagar taluka and Hadgaon taluka.

== Members of the Legislative Assembly ==
Election	Member	Party
1952	Madhava Rao Waipankar	People's Democratic Front
1957	Anjanbai Jaiwantrao	Indian National Congress
1962	Bhimrao Keshavrao Deshmukh	Indian National Congress
1967	Bhimrao Keshavrao Deshmukh	Indian National Congress
1972	Ganpatrao Rangrao Palkar	Indian National Congress
1978	Niwruttirao Mahadji Pawar- Jawalgaonkar	Janata Party
1980	Suryakanta Patil	Indian National Congress (I)
1985	Bapurao Shivram Shinde (Ashtikar)	Indian Congress
1990	Bapurao Shivram Shinde (Ashtikar)	Indian National Congress
1995	Subhash Bapurao Wankhede	Shiv Sena
1999	Subhash Bapurao Wankhede	Shiv Sena
2004	Subhash Bapurao Wankhede	Shiv Sena
2009	Madhavrao Nivruttirao Pawar-Jawalgaonkar	Indian National Congress
2014	Nagesh Bapurao Patil Ashtikar	Shiv Sena
2019	Madhavrao Nivruttirao Pawar - Jawalgaonkar	Indian National Congress
2024	Baburao Kadam Kohlikar	Shiv Sena

== Election results ==
=== Assembly Election 2024 ===
2024 Maharashtra Legislative Assembly election : Hadgaon
Party	Candidate	Votes	%	±%
SS	Baburao Kadam Kohlikar	113,245	52.49%	▲29.87
INC	Jawalgaonkar Madhavrao Nivruttirao Patil	83,178	38.55%	▲0.46
VBA	Dilip Aala Rathod	11,409	5.29%	▼0.27
NOTA	None of the above	600	0.28%	▼0.07
Margin of victory		30,067	13.94%	▲7.09
Turnout		216,355	72.30%	▲2.21
Total valid votes		215,755		
Registered electors		299,252		▲7.11
SS gain from INC		Swing	▲14.40	

=== Assembly Election 2019 ===
2019 Maharashtra Legislative Assembly election : Hadgaon
Party	Candidate	Votes	%	±%
INC	Jawalgaonkar Madhavrao Nivruttirao Patil	74,325	38.09%	▲3.15
Independent	Baburao Kadam Kohlikar	60,962	31.24%	New
SS	Nagesh Bapurao Patil Ashtikar	44,143	22.62%	▼19.53
VBA	Bharati Sudarshan Rambharati	10,856	5.56%	New
NOTA	None of the above	682	0.35%	▼0.22
Margin of victory		13,363	6.85%	▼0.37
Turnout		195,805	70.09%	▼0.24
Total valid votes		195,117		
Registered electors		279,379		▲4.79
INC gain from SS		Swing	▼4.06	

=== Assembly Election 2014 ===
2014 Maharashtra Legislative Assembly election : Hadgaon
Party	Candidate	Votes	%	±%
SS	Nagesh Bapurao Patil Ashtikar	78,520	42.15%	▲10.14
INC	Jawalgaonkar Madhavrao Nivruttirao Patil	65,079	34.94%	▼24.74
BBM	Dr. Baliram Vishvnath Bhurke	22,904	12.30%	▲10.54
BSP	Sk. Jaker Mahmmad Chaus	7,669	4.12%	▲2.94
BJP	Latabai Shyamsundar Kadam	6,908	3.71%	New
NCP	Prataprao Vinayakrao Deshmukh	1,818	0.98%	New
MNS	Sarda Suresh Mohanlal	1,647	0.88%	▲0.17
NOTA	None of the above	1,062	0.57%	New
Margin of victory		13,441	7.22%	▼20.45
Turnout		187,503	70.33%	▲0.33
Total valid votes		186,281		
Registered electors		266,610		▲15.28
SS gain from INC		Swing	▼17.53	

=== Assembly Election 2009 ===
2009 Maharashtra Legislative Assembly election : Hadgaon
Party	Candidate	Votes	%	±%
INC	Jawalgaonkar Madhavrao Nivruttirao Patil	96,584	59.68%	▲27.74
SS	Baburao alias Sambharao Kadam Kohalikar	51,803	32.01%	▼2.41
BBM	Nevarkar Gangadhar Ganpati	2,848	1.76%	▼16.81
Independent	Suresh Sitaram Jadhav	2,137	1.32%	New
BSP	Chavan Babu Dhanu	1,917	1.18%	▼0.19
JSS	Tikore Uttamrao Gangaram	1,456	0.90%	New
Shivrajya Party	Omprakash Keshavrao Shinde	1,178	0.73%	New
MNS	Haran (Patil) Keshav Vitthalrao	1,142	0.71%	New
Margin of victory		44,781	27.67%	▲25.19
Turnout		161,900	70.00%	▼3.88
Total valid votes		161,827		
Registered electors		231,275		▲13.43
INC gain from SS		Swing	▲25.26	

=== Assembly Election 2004 ===
2004 Maharashtra Legislative Assembly election : Hadgaon
Party	Candidate	Votes	%	±%
SS	Subhash Bapurao Wankhede	51,842	34.42%	▼0.67
INC	Jawalgaonkar Madhavrao Nivruttirao Patil	48,104	31.94%	▼0.63
BBM	Chabharkar Gangadhar Bibhishan	27,966	18.57%	New
Independent	Bapurao Shivram Patil Ashtikar	15,873	10.54%	New
Independent	Hukke Maroti Kanhoba	2,386	1.58%	New
BSP	Rathod Prakash Babarao	2,069	1.37%	New
Independent	Suresh Sitaram Jadhav	1,394	0.93%	New
Independent	Potdar Shriniwas Vaijanath	988	0.66%	New
Margin of victory		3,738	2.48%	▼0.04
Turnout		150,632	73.88%	▲5.02
Total valid votes		150,622		
Registered electors		203,892		▲20.86
SS hold		Swing	▼0.67	

=== Assembly Election 1999 ===
1999 Maharashtra Legislative Assembly election : Hadgaon
Party	Candidate	Votes	%	±%
SS	Subhash Bapurao Wankhede	36,496	35.09%	▲10.70
INC	Bapurao Shivram Patil Ashtikar	33,874	32.57%	▲16.88
NCP	Baburao Yadavrao Pawar Pathradkar	27,004	25.97%	New
Independent	Gajanan Chavan	3,110	2.99%	New
Independent	Ramchandra Fakira Rathod	1,791	1.72%	New
Independent	Prof. Bharat Dhole	729	0.70%	New
Margin of victory		2,622	2.52%	▼2.62
Turnout		116,164	68.86%	▼10.51
Total valid votes		103,995		
Registered electors		168,699		▲1.21
SS hold		Swing	▲10.70	

=== Assembly Election 1995 ===
1995 Maharashtra Legislative Assembly election : Hadgaon
Party	Candidate	Votes	%	±%
SS	Subhash Bapurao Wankhede	31,478	24.39%	New
Independent	Baburao Yadavrao Pawar Pathradkar	24,842	19.25%	New
BBM	Shaikh Jakir Shaikh Mohammed	24,765	19.19%	New
INC	Bapurao Shivram Patil Ashtikar	20,252	15.69%	▼15.51
JD	Shakarge Laxmanrao Girjappa	14,485	11.22%	▲2.46
Independent	Rathod Ganesh Sitaram	6,272	4.86%	New
Independent	Shinde Shivaji Nathu	4,300	3.33%	New
Independent	Bache Nandiappa Tukaram	932	0.72%	New
Margin of victory		6,636	5.14%	▼1.04
Turnout		132,300	79.37%	▲11.18
Total valid votes		129,058		
Registered electors		166,684		▲9.03
SS gain from INC		Swing	▼6.81	

=== Assembly Election 1990 ===
1990 Maharashtra Legislative Assembly election : Hadgaon
Party	Candidate	Votes	%	±%
INC	Bapurao Shivram Patil Ashtikar	31,739	31.20%	▼5.77
BJP	Prataprao Vinayakrao Deshmukh	25,449	25.02%	New
RPI	Ganesh Sitaram Rathod	18,936	18.61%	New
JD	Bhagwan Namdeorao Kadam	8,908	8.76%	New
Independent	Mirashe Ramrao Punjaji	8,856	8.71%	New
Independent	Gunjkar Ramchandra Dattarao	1,760	1.73%	New
Independent	Kamble Mariba Rama	1,571	1.54%	New
INS(SCS)	Gaushkhar Kareemkhan	1,102	1.08%	New
Margin of victory		6,290	6.18%	▼12.37
Turnout		104,247	68.19%	▲3.25
Total valid votes		101,732		
Registered electors		152,881		▲16.56
INC gain from IC(S)		Swing	▼24.32	

=== Assembly Election 1985 ===
1985 Maharashtra Legislative Assembly election : Hadgaon
Party	Candidate	Votes	%	±%
IC(S)	Bapurao Shivram Patil Ashtikar	46,365	55.52%	New
INC	Vinayakrao Ramrao Deshmukh	30,873	36.97%	New
Independent	Pralhad Nagorao Dhole	4,839	5.79%	New
Independent	Suryawanshi Arjunrao	847	1.01%	New
Independent	Sahebrao Ganpat Raut	583	0.70%	New
Margin of victory		15,492	18.55%	▲17.83
Turnout		85,171	64.94%	▼0.11
Total valid votes		83,507		
Registered electors		131,159		▲16.41
IC(S) gain from INC(I)		Swing	▲7.10	

=== Assembly Election 1980 ===
1980 Maharashtra Legislative Assembly election : Hadgaon
Party	Candidate	Votes	%	±%
INC(I)	Suryakanta Patil	34,713	48.42%	New
INC(U)	Bapurao Shivram Shinde Patil Ashtikar	34,196	47.70%	New
RPI(K)	Wadhve Narayan Parashram	2,512	3.50%	New
Margin of victory		517	0.72%	▲0.71
Turnout		73,296	65.05%	▼8.36
Total valid votes		71,694		
Registered electors		112,669		▲8.08
INC(I) gain from JP		Swing	▲9.21	

=== Assembly Election 1978 ===
1978 Maharashtra Legislative Assembly election : Hadgaon
Party	Candidate	Votes	%	±%
JP	Niwruttirao Mahadji Pawar Patil Jawalgaonkar	29,107	39.21%	New
INC	Bapurao Shivram Shinde Patil Ashtikar	29,101	39.20%	▼18.83
Independent	Muneshwar Baliram Vithalrao	5,043	6.79%	New
Independent	Gaikwad Shankarrao Baliram	4,324	5.82%	New
PWPI	Sinde Vithalrao Raghoji	3,741	5.04%	▲4.41
Independent	Wadgaonkar Uttamrao Shivaji	1,802	2.43%	New
Independent	Shetty Satva Bhiwsan	1,119	1.51%	New
Margin of victory		6	0.01%	▼25.62
Turnout		76,522	73.41%	▲23.31
Total valid votes		74,237		
Registered electors		104,242		▼0.82
JP gain from INC		Swing	▼18.82	

=== Assembly Election 1972 ===
1972 Maharashtra Legislative Assembly election : Hadgaon
Party	Candidate	Votes	%	±%
INC	Palkar Ganpatrao Rangrao	29,519	58.03%	▲0.49
CPI	Shinde Virendra Govindaro	16,481	32.40%	▲1.25
Independent	Kisanrao Narayanrao	1,797	3.53%	New
Independent	Dange Kishanrao Dattram	1,481	2.91%	New
Independent	P. S. Sadashiv	748	1.47%	New
PWPI	Sinde Vithalrao Raghoji	320	0.63%	New
Margin of victory		13,038	25.63%	▼0.76
Turnout		52,663	50.10%	▼9.47
Total valid votes		50,869		
Registered electors		105,109		▲13.91
INC hold		Swing	▲0.49	

=== Assembly Election 1967 ===
1967 Maharashtra Legislative Assembly election : Hadgaon
Party	Candidate	Votes	%	±%
INC	Bhimrao Keshavrao Deshmukh	29,308	57.54%	▲8.84
CPI	V. G. Shinde	15,865	31.15%	▲1.48
Independent	H. V. Jadhare	2,673	5.25%	New
ABJS	G. T. Wategaonkar	1,542	3.03%	New
Independent	L. D. Dange	1,048	2.06%	New
Independent	A. S. Chaure	500	0.98%	New
Margin of victory		13,443	26.39%	▲7.36
Turnout		54,969	59.57%	▲0.82
Total valid votes		50,936		
Registered electors		92,275		▲11.81
INC hold		Swing	▲8.84	

=== Assembly Election 1962 ===
1962 Maharashtra Legislative Assembly election : Hadgaon
Party	Candidate	Votes	%	±%
INC	Bhimrao Keshavrao Deshmukh	21,742	48.70%	▼2.75
CPI	Nagorao Hanmantrao	13,246	29.67%	New
Independent	Dattram Vyenkoji	7,988	17.89%	New
Independent	Kondba Nagnath	1,075	2.41%	New
Independent	Kishanrao Dattaram	597	1.34%	New
Margin of victory		8,496	19.03%	▲16.13
Turnout		48,487	58.75%	▲15.76
Total valid votes		44,648		
Registered electors		82,527		▲27.49
INC hold		Swing	▼2.75	

=== Assembly Election 1957 ===
1957 Bombay State Legislative Assembly election : Hadgaon
Party	Candidate	Votes	%	±%
INC	Anjanbai Jaiwantrao	14,317	51.45%	▲16.41
Independent	Bodhankar Shamrao Madhavrao	13,511	48.55%	New
Margin of victory		806	2.90%	▼15.89
Turnout		27,828	42.99%	▲4.29
Total valid votes		27,828		
Registered electors		64,731		▲21.30
INC gain from PDF		Swing	▼2.38	

=== Assembly Election 1952 ===
1952 Hyderabad State Legislative Assembly election : Hadgaon
Party	Candidate	Votes	%	±%
PDF	Waipankar Madhava Rao	11,118	53.83%	New
INC	Shankar Rao	7,237	35.04%	New
Socialist	Govinda Hari	2,297	11.12%	New
Margin of victory		3,881	18.79%	
Turnout		20,652	38.70%	
Total valid votes		20,652		
Registered electors		53,363		
PDF win (new seat)				
