= Aundha Nagnath Temple =

Hindu Shiva temple in Aundha Nagnath, Maharashtra, India

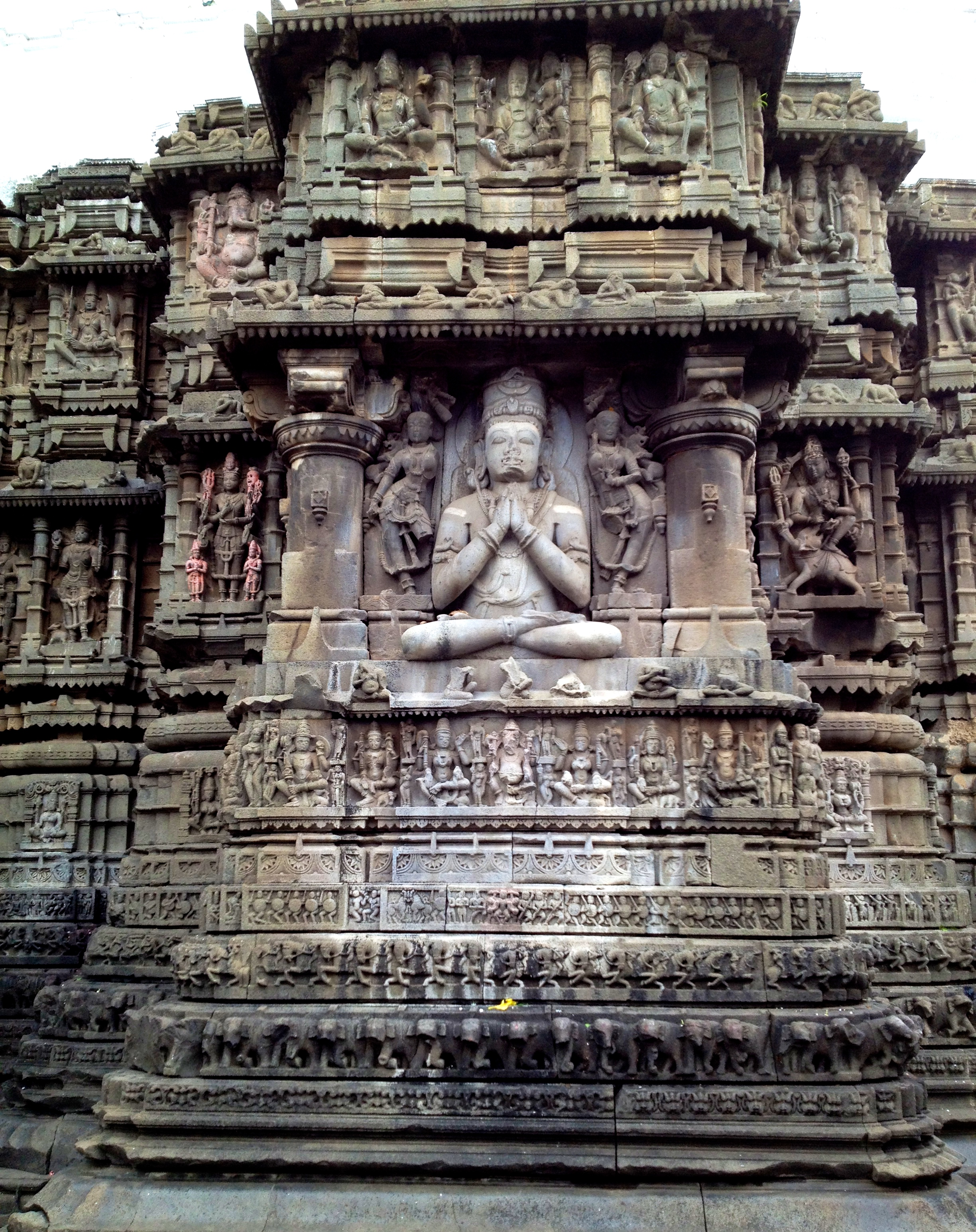

- Location in Maharashtra

Religion
- Affiliation: Hinduism
- District: Hingoli
- Deity: Shiva
- Festival: Mahashivratri

Location
- Location: Aundha Nagnath
- State: Maharashtra
- Country: India
- Interactive map of Aundha Nagnath Temple
- Coordinates: 19.537087°N 77.041508°E

Architecture
- Type: Hemadpanthi

Website
- www.aundhanagnath.in

Aundha Nagnath Temple is an ancient Shiva temple located at Aundha Nagnath in the Hingoli district of Maharashtra, India. It is considered to be the eighth of the twelve Jyotirlinga shrines dedicated to Lord Shiva. The temple is a significant historical heritage site, representing a confluence of history, architecture, faith, and culture.

The temple's history is linked to various significant periods, from the Pandavas of the Mahabharata to the Yadavas of Devagiri and later Ahilyabai Holkar. The legend of the temple rotating for the great saint Namdev further elevates its importance. Key features of the temple include its unique blend of Hemadpanti and Maratha architectural styles, a distinctive basement sanctum (garbhagriha), scenic surrounding hills, and a grand chariot festival during Mahashivratri. The Archaeological Survey of India has declared the temple a 'Protected Monument of National Importance'.

== Religious Significance and Identity ==
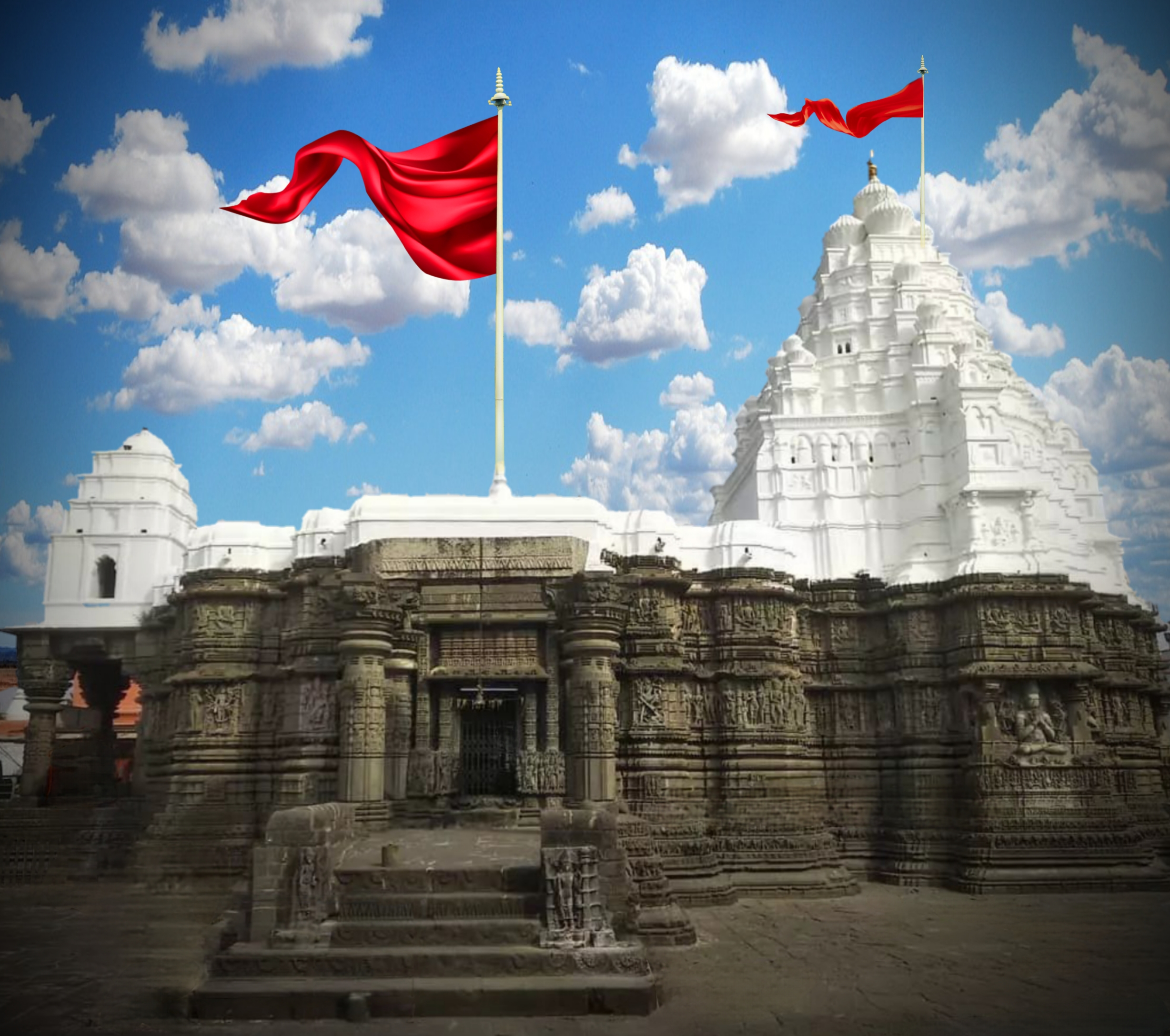
Shri Nageshwar Jyotirlinga, Garbhagriha (Sanctum)

=== Position as a Jyotirlinga ===
According to the Shiva Purana and other religious texts, Aundha Nagnath is the eighth of the twelve Jyotirlingas. A Jyotirlinga represents the radiant, self-manifested pillar of light of Shiva. The name 'Nagnath' signifies Shiva as the Lord of Serpents. It is a strong belief among devotees that worshipping here provides relief from Kaal Sarp Dosh and other serpent-related afflictions.

=== Darukavana and Mythology ===
As per mythological beliefs, the ancient name of this region was Darukavana (a forest of deodar trees). A story in the Shiva Purana states that a demoness named Daruka performed penance in this forest and pleased Goddess Parvati. Misusing her boons, Daruka began to torment people, including a devout Shiva follower named Supriya. In response to Supriya's prayers, Lord Shiva appeared, vanquished the demon, and, at the request of his devotees, settled here permanently in the form of a Jyotirlinga named 'Nagnath'. (Note: This legend is also associated with the Nageshwar Jyotirlinga in Gujarat, but in Maharashtra, Aundha Nagnath is revered as the Jyotirlinga of Darukavana.)

=== Sant Namdev and the Temple's Legend ===
A famous event from the life of the great Varkari saint Namdev (c. 1270–1350 CE) is associated with this temple. It is said that when Sant Namdev was singing kirtans (devotional songs), the temple priests obstructed him and asked him to move to the back of the temple. In deep devotion, Namdev prayed to the Lord. Pleased with his devotion, the entire temple is said to have miraculously rotated, turning its entrance to face him.

The current layout of the temple, with the statue of Nandi at the back, is believed to corroborate this story. This event has made the temple a sacred pilgrimage site for the Varkari sect as well.

== Connection with Sikhism ==
Aundha Nagnath Temple holds a special place in Sikhism as well. This connection is primarily through Sant Namdev, 61 of whose hymns (shabads/bani) are included in the holy scripture of Sikhism, the Guru Granth Sahib. Although a revered Varkari saint, Namdev is honored in Sikhism as a great 'Bhagat' (devotee).

The fifth Sikh Guru, Guru Arjan Dev, while compiling the Guru Granth Sahib, included not only the teachings of Sikh Gurus but also the works of various Indian saints like Namdev, Kabir, and Ravidas, promoting the message of 'One God'. As Aundha Nagnath is an integral part of Sant Namdev's life, it has become a place of reverence in Sikh tradition.

It is also believed that the founder of Sikhism, Guru Nanak, visited this sacred Jyotirlinga shrine during his travels in Southern India (known as 'udasis'). Consequently, many Sikhs consider this site to be sanctified by Guru Nanak's presence. Due to these historical and spiritual ties, Aundha Nagnath stands as a symbol of shared faith for both Hindus and Sikhs.

== History ==
=== Ancient Origins and Yadava Period ===
The temple's mythical origin is credited to the Pandavas from the Mahabharata. According to legend, Yudhishthira built the temple during their period of exile.

Historically, the original structure of the temple is dated to the 13th century, during the reign of the Yadavas of Devagiri. It is a prime example of the Hemadpanti architectural style, developed by their minister Hemadri Pandit. This style is characterized by interlocking stones without the use of mortar.

=== Renovation by Ahilyabai Holkar ===
During the medieval period, the temple suffered significant damage due to invasions by the Delhi Sultanate. Later, in the 18th century, Ahilyabai Holkar (1725–1795), the ruler of the Holkar kingdom of Indore, undertook the renovation of numerous Jyotirlinga shrines across India. It is widely believed that she also renovated the Aundha Nagnath temple.

This renovation likely included the reconstruction of the upper part of the temple and its shikhara (spire). The current spire exhibits a Maratha style of architecture, distinct from the original Hemadpanti base.

== Architecture ==
The temple's architecture is a blend of two distinct styles from different periods:

- Original Hemadpanti Structure: The base of the temple, including its outer walls and the sanctum, is from the Yadava period (13th century). This section features intricate carvings of deities, mythological scenes, elephants, and geometric designs.
- Maratha-era Reconstruction: The upper portion and the spire (shikhara) were rebuilt in a later period, likely the 18th century.
- Basement Sanctum (Garbhagriha): The most unique feature of the temple is its sanctum, which is located in a small chamber in the basement, accessible by a narrow flight of stairs. The Jyotirlinga is installed here.
- Position of Nandi: Due to the legend of Sant Namdev, the pavilion of Nandi (Shiva's bull) is located at the rear of the temple, which is an exception to the traditional layout.

== Festivals and Traditions ==
=== Mahashivratri and Chariot Festival ===
Mahashivratri is the largest festival celebrated at the temple. Lakhs of devotees gather to offer their prayers. The grand chariot festival (Rathotsav) held at night is the main attraction, where an idol of the Lord is carried in a procession on a decorated chariot amidst chants of "Har Har Mahadev".

=== Other Festivals ===
- Shravan Month: The entire month of Shraavana, especially the Mondays, is a period of celebration. Thousands of devotees (Kavadiyas) undertake a pilgrimage on foot to offer holy water to the Jyotirlinga.
- Vijayadashami: A palanquin procession is organized on this day.

== See also ==
- Jyotirlinga
- Grishneshwar Temple
- Trimbakeshwar Shiva Temple
- Bhimashankar Temple
- Shri Vaijnath Temple
