= Hingoli Lok Sabha constituency =

Constituency of the Indian parliament in Maharashtra

Coordinates: 19.72°N 77.15°E

Hingoli Lok Sabha
- Lok Sabha constituency
- Hingoli Lok Sabha Constituency map

Constituency details
- Country: India
- Region: Western India
- State: Maharashtra
- Assembly constituencies: Umarkhed; Kinwat; Hadgaon; Basmath; Kalamnuri; Hingoli
- Established: 1977 (49 years ago)
- Total electors: 18,17,734
- Reservation: None

Member of Parliament
- 18th Lok Sabha
- Incumbent Nagesh Ashtikar
- Party: SHS
- Alliance: NDA
- Elected year: 2024
- Preceded by: Hemant Sriram Patil

Hingoli Lok Sabha constituency is one of the 48 Lok Sabha (parliamentary) constituencies in Maharashtra state in western India.

== Assembly segments ==
Presently, after the implementation of delimitation of the parliamentary constituencies in 2008, based on the recommendations of the Delimitation Commission of India constituted in 2002, Hingoli Lok Sabha constituency comprises six Vidhan Sabha (legislative assembly) segments. These segments with constituency numbers are:

#	Name	District	Member	Party	Leading (in 2024)
82	Umarkhed (SC)	Yavatmal	Kisan Wankhede	BJP	SS(UBT)
83	Kinwat	Nanded	Bhimrao Keram	BJP	SS(UBT)
84	Hadgaon	Nanded	Baburao Kadam Kohalikar	SHS	SS(UBT)
92	Basmath	Hingoli	Chandrakant Nawghare	NCP	SS(UBT)
93	Kalamnuri	Hingoli	Santosh Bangar	SHS	SS(UBT)
94	Hingoli	Hingoli	Tanaji Mutkule	BJP	SS(UBT)

== Members of Parliament ==
Year	Name	Party
1952-76 : Constituency does not exist
1977	Chandrakant Ramkrishna Patil	Janata Party
1980	Uttamrao Rathod	Indian National Congress
1984	Uttamrao Rathod	Indian National Congress
1989	Uttamrao Rathod	Indian National Congress
1991	Vilasrao Gundewar	Shiv Sena
1996	Shivaji Mane	Shiv Sena
1998	Suryakanta Patil	Indian National Congress
1999	Shivaji Mane	Shiv Sena
2004	Suryakanta Patil	Nationalist Congress Party
2009	Subhash Wankhede	Shiv Sena
2014	Rajiv Satav	Indian National Congress
2019	Hemant Patil	Shiv Sena
2024	Nagesh Bapurao Patil Ashtikar	Shiv Sena (Uddhav Balasaheb Thackeray)

== Election results ==
=== 2024 ===
2024 Indian general election: Hingoli
Party	Candidate	Votes	%	±%
SS(UBT)	Nagesh Bapurao Patil Ashtikar	492,535	42.49	New
SS	Baburao Kadam Kohalikar	3,83,933	33.12	▼17.53
VBA	Dr. B.D.Chavhan	1,61,814	13.96	▼1.08
Independent	Ambadas Sukaji Gade	14,742	1.27	N/A
CPI(M)	Vijay Ramji Gabhane	14,644	1.26	N/A
NOTA	None of the Above	3,123	0.27	N/A
Majority		1,08,602	9.37	▼14.63
Turnout		11,59,300	63.78	▼3.06
SS(UBT) gain from SS		Swing		

=== 2019 ===
2019 Indian general election: Hingoli
Party	Candidate	Votes	%	±%
SS	Hemant Sriram Patil	586,312	50.65	
INC	Subhash Wankhede	3,08,456	26.65	
VBA	Mohan Fattusing Rathod	1,74,051	15.04	
IND	Sandesh Ram Chandra Chavan	23,690	2.05	
Majority		2,77,856	24.00	+23.83
Turnout		11,58,767	66.84	+0.55
SS gain from INC		Swing	+2.09	

=== 2014 ===
2014 Indian general election: Hingoli
Party	Candidate	Votes	%	±%
INC	Rajeev Satav	467,397	48.59	N/A
SS	Subhash Wankhede	4,65,765	48.42	+6.81
BSP	Chunnilal Jadhav	25,145	2.61	−11.01
CPI(M)	D.B.Naik	14,986	1.43	N/A
BMP	Uttamrao Pandurang Rathod	9,770	0.93	N/A
BBM	Ramrao Harising Rathod	9,577	0.91	N/A
Independent	Uttam Maroti Dhabe	7,878	0.75	N/A
AAP	Vithal Kadam	3,729	0.39	N/A
Majority		1,629	0.17	−8.84
Turnout		10,51,477	66.29	
INC gain from SS		Swing		

=== 2009 ===
2009 Indian general election: Hingoli
Party	Candidate	Votes	%	±%
SS	Subhash Wankhede	340,148	41.61	
NCP	Suryakanta Patil	2,66,514	32.60	
BSP	Dr. B. D. Chavan	1,11,357	13.62	
BBM	Madhavrao Naik	52,329	6.40	
Majority		73,634	9.01	
Turnout		8,17,467	59.68	
SS gain from NCP		Swing		

== See also ==
- Yavatmal district
- Hingoli district
- Nanded district
- List of constituencies of the Lok Sabha
