= Jawalgaonkar Madhavrao Nivruttirao Patil =

Indian politician

Madhavrao Patil

Member of the Maharashtra Legislative Assembly
- In office (2009-2014), (2019-2024)
- Preceded by: Baburao Kohalikar Kadam(2009)
- Succeeded by: Nagesh Patil
- Constituency: Hadgaon Assembly constituency

Personal details
- Born: 9 August 1972 (age 54) Hadgaon, Nanded district, Maharashtra, India
- Party: Indian National Congress
- Occupation: Politician

Madhavrao Nivruttirao Pawar Patil Jawalgaonkar also known as Madhavrao Patil (born 9 August 1972) is an Indian politician from Maharashtra. He is a member of the Indian National Congress and represented the Hadgaon Assembly constituency in the Maharashtra Legislative Assembly. He won the seat in the 2009 Maharashtra Legislative Assembly election and was elected again in the 2019.

== Early life and education ==
Jawalgaonkar is from Hadgaon, in Nanded district, Maharashtra. He is the son of former MLA Nivattirao Mahadji Pawar. He completed his Bachelor of Arts degree in 1993 at D. B. College, Bhokar.

== Political career ==
Jawalgaonkar first contested the Hadgaon Assembly constituency in the 2004 Maharashtra Legislative Assembly election but was unsuccessful. He was elected to the Maharashtra Legislative Assembly for the first time in the 2009 Maharashtra Legislative Assembly election, defeating Shiv Sena candidate Baburao Kohalikar Kadam by a margin of 44,781 votes.

In the 2014 Maharashtra Legislative Assembly election, he lost the Hadgaon seat to Nagesh Bapurao Patil Ashtikar.

He returned to the assembly in the 2019 Maharashtra Legislative Assembly election. Contesting as an Indian National Congress candidate, he received 74,325 votes and defeated independent candidate Baburao Kohalikar Kadam by 13,363 votes.

== Positions held ==
- 2009: Elected to the Maharashtra Legislative Assembly from Hadgaon.
- 2014: Lost the Hadgaon Assembly election to Nagesh Bapurao Patil Ashtikar.
- 2019: Re-elected to the Maharashtra Legislative Assembly from Hadgaon.
