= Suryakanta Patil =

Indian politician

The Honorable Suryakanta Patil
- सुर्यकांता पाटील
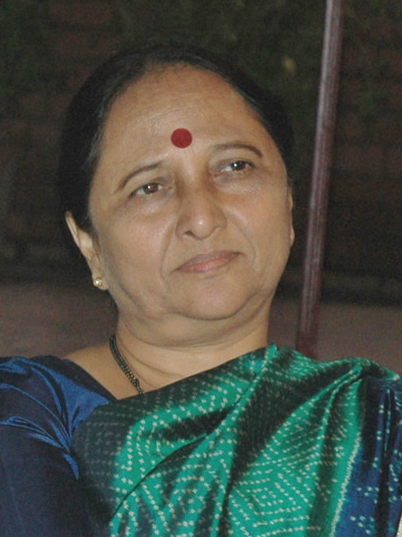
- Patil in 2006

Minister of State in Ministry of Rural Development & Ministry of Parliamentary Affairs Government of India
- In office 23 May 2004 — 22 May 2009
- Prime Minister: Manmohan Singh
- Preceded by: M. Venkaiah Naidu
- Succeeded by: Agatha Sangma (Rural Development); V. Narayanasamy (Parliamentary Affairs)

Member of Parliament, Lok Sabha
- In office 14 May 2004 — 17 May 2009
- Preceded by: Shivaji Mane
- Succeeded by: Subhash Wankhede
- Constituency: Hingoli
- In office 10 March 1998 — 26 April 1999
- Preceded by: Shivaji Mane
- Succeeded by: Shivaji Mane
- Constituency: Hingoli
- In office 21 June 1991 – 16 May 1996
- Preceded by: Venkatesh Kabde
- Succeeded by: Gangadharrao Deshmukh-Kunturkar
- Constituency: Nanded

Member of Parliament, Rajya Sabha
- In office 1986–91
- Succeeded by: Rajni Patil
- Constituency: Maharashtra

Member of Maharashtra Legislative Assembly
- In office 1980–85
- Preceded by: Nivruttirao Pawar-Jawalgaonkar
- Succeeded by: Bapurao Shinde
- Constituency: Hadgaon-Himayatnagar

Personal details
- Born: Suryakanta Jayawantrao Patil; 15 August 1948 (age 78) Yavatmal, Maharashtra
- Party: Nationalist Congress Party (Sharadchandra Pawar) (2024–present); Bharatiya Janata Party (2014–2024); Nationalist Congress Party (2004–2014); Indian National Congress (until 2004)
- Spouse: R. B. Maske
- Children: 1 Son and 1 Daughter
- Parent: Jayawantrao Vikramsingh Patil Waiphanekar
- As of 16 September, 2006

Suryakanta Patil (born 15 August 1948) is an Indian politician from Maharashtra. She is a former member of the Lok Sabha. She represented the Hingoli & Nanded of Maharashtra.

She was a member of the Nationalist Congress Party. Later in 2014, resigned from party and joined Bhartiya Janata Party along with Dr. Madhavrao Kinhalkar.

She was the Minister of State in the Ministry of Rural Development and Minister of State in the Ministry of Parliamentary Affairs. Place of Birth: Waiphana, Nanded, Maharashtra. Marital Status: Married on 2 January 1966.

== As Journalist ==
- Editor, Godawari Times – a daily in Marathi
- President- District Journalist Association (associated with Akhil Bhartiya Patrakar Parishad) since 1980.
- Journalist-Editor Literacy Artistic and Scientific Accomplishment

== Political career ==
- Corporator, Nanded-Waghala Municipal Corporation

=== Within Party ===
1971: President-District Congress Committee (women's Wing), Nanded.

1972–74: General Secretary-District Youth Congress

1977–78: Founder- Member D.C.C. (India) Nanded

1980: Member- Municipal Council Nanded

1980–85: Member- Maharashtra Legislative Assembly (Hadgaon)

1981–82: Chairperson- Committee of Subordinate Legislation

1981–85: General Secretary- Pradesh Youth Congress (I), Maharashtra

1991–96: Executive Member-CPP Congress Parliamentary Party (I)

1997–98: Vice President- Pradesh Congress Committee

=== In Legislature ===
1986–91: MP-(Rajya Sabha) elected from Maharashtra from Indian National Congress party.

1988–89: Member- Consultative Committee, Ministry of Petroleum and Chemicals

1988–90: Member, Committee of Rules

- Member of Hindi Salahakar Samity, Ministry of steel and mines and Ministry of Water Resources
- Member- Central Advisory Committee for Light House, Ministry of Surface Transport

1991: Elected to 10th Loksabha from Nanded Loksabha constituency

1998: Re-elected on 12th Loksabha (2nd term)

1998–99: Member Committee of Defense and its Sub-Committee-I Member Joint Committee of Empowerment of women and its Sub Committee on Appraisal of laws relating to women -Criminal Laws

1999–2004: Vice Chairperson- of Maharashtra Council of Agriculture Education and Research (MCAER), Pune

2004–2009 – MP & Minister of state in Ministry of Rural Development from NCP Quota.

== Special interest ==
Solving problems of women, Labour Movements, rural Development and Upliftment of poor and downtrodden

Favorite Pastime Recreation: Reading, listening to music and enjoying nature

Sports and Clubs: Swimming, shooting and table-tennis

Political and social worker, Trade Unionist

== Countries Visited ==
Japan, U.S.A., China, Egypt, U.K., Germany, New Zealand, U.A.E, Guatemala, Nicaragua.

== Other information ==
Imprisoned thrice during Janata regime and appeared before the Shah Commission.

- Member Consultative Committee Ministry of Environment and Forest
- Chairperson- Education Committee of Municipal Council, Nanded.
- Chairperson: Mahila Udyog Vikas Santha since its formation in 1977–78
- Founding President: Multipurpose Labour Union, Nanded
- President: Hutatma Jaywantrao Patil Cooperative Sugar Factory, Suryanagar Tq. Hadgaon Dist. Nanded
- Director-District Nanded Cooperative Consumer Federation since 1988;
- Director: Maharashtra State Co-operative Bank, Mumbai.
