= Kisan Wankhede =

Indian politician

Member of the Maharashtra Legislative Assembly
- Incumbent
- Assumed office (2024 - Present)
- Preceded by: Namdev Sasane
- Constituency: Umarkhed

Personal details
- Born: Kisanrao Maroti Wankhede; 7 November 1964 (age 61) At.Umarkhed, Dist.Yavatmal District
- Party: Bharatiya Janata Party

Kisanrao Maroti Wankhede is an Indian politician from Maharashtra. He is a member of the Maharashtra Legislative Assembly from 2024, representing Umarkhed Assembly constituency as a member of the Bharatiya Janata Party.

== Political career ==
Kisan Wankhede is a member of the Rashtriya Swayamsevak Sangh (RSS), a far-right Hindu nationalist paramilitary volunteer organisation and he has close relation with Senior BJP Member of Yavatmal District Nitin bhau Bhutada of Umarkhed

== See also ==
- List of chief ministers of Maharashtra
- Maharashtra Legislative Assembly
