= Dadasaheb Rupwate =

Indian politician, newspaper editor, and Ambedkarite activist

Cabinet Minister Of Housing, Social Welfare, Cultural Affairs, Fisheries and Slum Development Government of Maharashtra
- In office 1977–1978
- In office 1972–1975

Member of Maharashtra Legislative Council
- In office 1968–1978

Personal details
- Born: 28 February 1925; Maharashtra, India
- Died: 23 July 1999; Maharashtra, India
- Political party: Scheduled Caste Federation, Republican Party of India, Indian National Congress
- Occupation: Activist, Journalist, Legislator

Damodar Tatyaba Rupwate (28 February 1925 – 23 July 1999), commonly known as Dadasaheb Rupwate was an Indian politician, Ambedkarite social activist and newspaper editor from Maharashtra. Initially he was a member of the Scheduled Caste Federation and the Republican Party of India, and later the Indian National Congress. Dadasaheb Rupwate was a colleague and follower of B. R. Ambedkar, human rights leader.

He was a founder-member of the Republican Party of India (1957). He was a member of the Maharashtra Legislative Council for the period 1968 to 1978. He served as twice Cabinet Minister State of Maharashtra for the period 1972 to 1975 and 1977 to 1978; and He had Departments: Social Welfare, Housing, Cultural, Fisheries, Slum Development. He was the general secretary of All India Congress Committee. He is a committee members of Dr. Babasaheb Ambedkar: Writing and Speeches, a 22-volume series.

He was an editor of weekly "Prabuddha Bharat" and Marathi Encyclopedia, Vai (1962–1966). He was a sub-editor of "The Republican" (1960–1962). He was a trustee of weekly "Sadhana" Trust (1968 – 1978 and from 1997 onwards). Inspired by Ambedkar's Dalit Buddhist movement, Rupwate and his family converted to Buddhism in 1956. His son Premanand Rupwate was a social activist and politician.

Dadasaheb Rupwate Vidyalay And Junior College, in Ahmednagar is named after him.
