= Nagesh Bapurao Patil Ashtikar =

Indian politician

Nagesh Patil

Member of Parliament, Lok Sabha
- Incumbent
- Assumed office 4 June 2024
- Preceded by: Hemant Patil
- Constituency: Hingoli

Member of Maharashtra Legislative Assembly
- In office 19 October 2014 – 24 October 2019
- Preceded by: Madhavrao Patil
- Succeeded by: Madhavrao Patil
- Constituency: Hadgaon

Personal details
- Party: Shiv Sena (June 2026-Present), (Till 2022)
- Other political affiliations: Shiv Sena(UBT) (2022-2026)
- Occupation: Politician

Nagesh Bapurao Shinde-Ashtikar is also known as Nagesh Patil. He is a Shiv Sena (2022) politician from Nanded district, Marathwada. He was a member of the 13th Maharashtra Legislative Assembly. He represents the Hadgaon Assembly Constituency.

== Career ==
In 2009 he was Chairman of the Hadgaon Taluka Agricultural produce market committee. He was appointed Hadgaon taluka pramukh of Shiv Sena in 2013. His panel Shri Datta Shetkari Vikas Panel swept elections to Hadgaon Vividha Karyakari Seva Sahakari Sanstha in March 2015.

== Controversy ==
He is amongst 11 members of the 13th Assembly, who have an asset value of over ₹ 1 Crore but haven't declared self Income Tax Return.

== Positions held ==
- 2014: Elected to Maharashtra Legislative Assembly
- 2015: Elected as Director of Nanded District Central Co-operative Bank
- 2024: Elected to Loksabha from Hingoli
