= Basmath =

Coordinates: 19.3167°N 77.1667°E

Basmath Basmat, Vasumatinagari
- city
- Interactive map of Basmath
- Country: India
- State: Maharashtra
- District: Hingoli

Government
  - Body: Municipal Council (India)

Population (2011)
  - Total: 68,846

Language
  - Official: Marathi
  - Other: Hindi
- Time zone: UTC+5:30 (IST)
- PIN: 431512
- Vehicle registration: MH 38

Basmath is a city and a municipal council in Hingoli district in the state of Maharashtra, India.

== Demographics ==
As of 2001 India census, Basmath had a population of 57,360. Males constitute 52% of the population and females 48%. Basmath has an average literacy rate of 65%, higher than the national average of 59.5%; with 58% of the males and 42% of females literate. 16% of the population is under 6 years of age.

== Geographical indication ==
Vasmat Haldi was awarded the Geographical Indication (GI) status tag from the Geographical Indications Registry under the Union Government of India on 30 March 2024 (valid until 19 October 2031).

Honourable Balasaheb Thackeray Haridra Research and Training Center from Vasmat, proposed the GI registration of Vasmat Haldi (turmeric). After filing the application in October 2021, the Turmeric was granted the GI tag in 2024 by the Geographical Indication Registry in Chennai, making the name "Vasmat Haldi (turmeric)" exclusive to the Turmeric grown in the region. It thus became the third turmeric variety from Maharashtra after Sangli turmeric and the 37th type of goods from Maharashtra to earn the GI tag.
