= Hadgaon =

- City
- Location in Maharashtra, India Hadgaon (India)
- Coordinates: 19.5°N 77.67°E
- Country: India
- State: Maharashtra
- District: Nanded
- Elevation: 2,699 m (8,855 ft)

Population (2011)
  - Total: 27,433

Languages Marathi, Hindi English
- Time zone: UTC+5:30 (IST)
- Postal code: 431712

Hadgaon is a city and a municipal council in Nanded district in the Indian state of Maharashtra. Kednarth Temple is located at Kedarguda village about 16 kilometres (9.9 mi) from the town and attracts pilgrims. Also there are religious temples of Lord Datta & Renuka at Datta Bardi and Ukhlai Ashram, Vitthal Mandir, Ganpati Mandir in old town. Hadgaon was main place of activist in Marathwada Mukti Sangram Led by Swami Ramanand Teerth. It has an average elevation of 2,699 metres (8,855 ft).

== Demographics ==
As of 2018 India census, Hadgaon had a population of 58347. Males constitute 52% of the population and females 48%. Hadgaon has an average literacy rate of 65%, higher than the national average of 59.5%: male literacy is 73%, and female literacy is 55%. In Hadgaon, 16% of the population is under 6 years of age.

Year	Male	Female	Total Population	Change	Religion (%)							
Year	Male	Female	Total Population	Change	Hindu	Muslim	Christian	Sikhs	Buddhist	Jain	Other religions and persuasions	Religion not stated
2001	12,128	11,211	23,339	-	63.088	24.461	0.120	0.090	11.560	0.574	0.047	0.060
2011	14,066	13,367	27,433	̘+17.5%	60.704	26.300	0.109	0.051	12.004	0.452	0.055	0.324
