= Vilasrao Gundewar =

Indian politician

Vilasrao Gundewar was a member of the 10th Lok Sabha of India. He represented the Hingoli constituency of Maharashtra and is a member of the Shiv Sena political party.
