= Hingoli =

- City
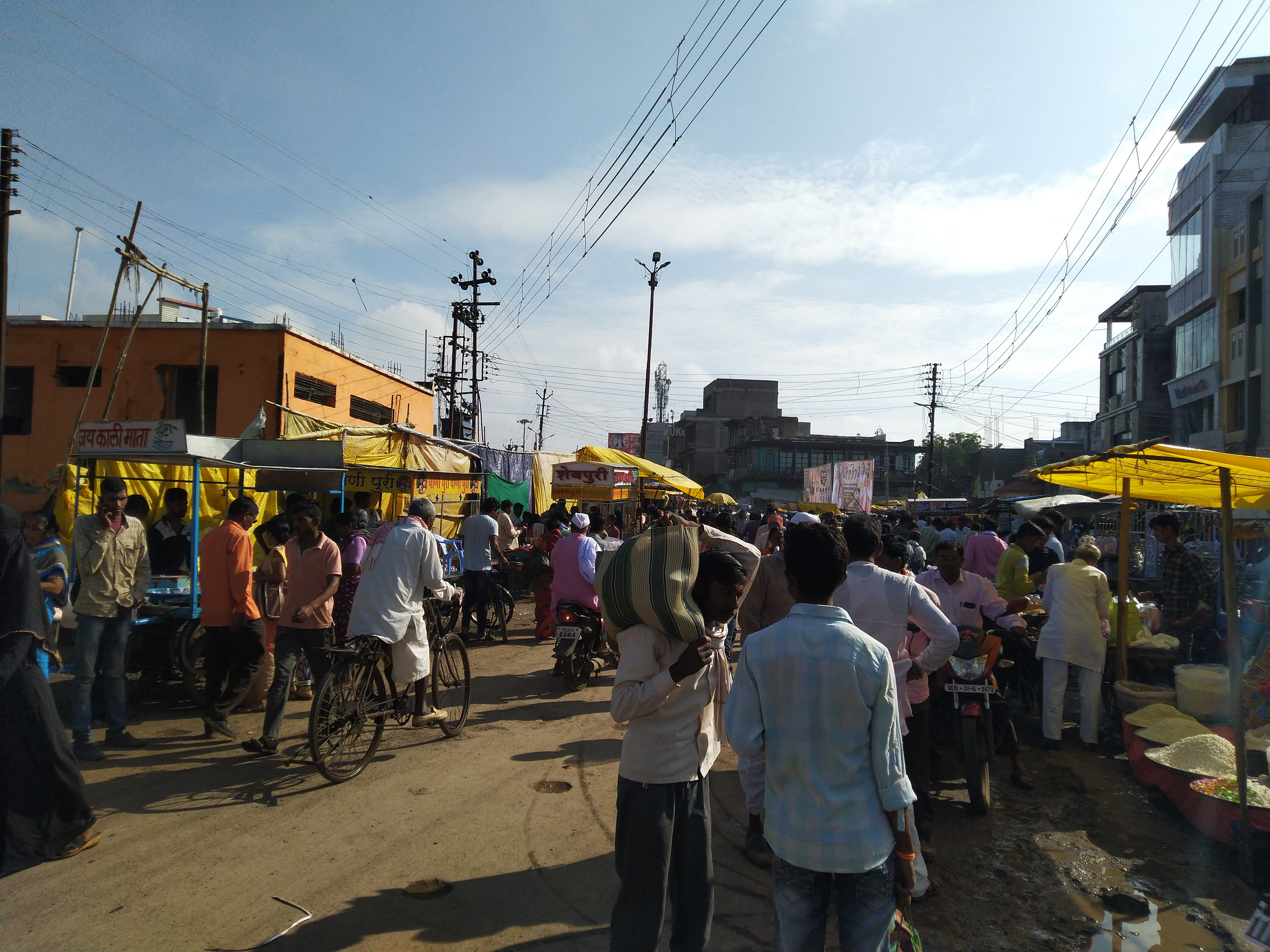
- Maharashtra
- Interactive map of Hingoli
- Coordinates: 19.72°N 77.15°E
- Country: India
- State: Maharashtra
- District: Hingoli

Government
  - Type: Municipal Corporation

Area
  - Total: 22.5 km^{2} (8.7 sq mi)
- Elevation: 457 m (1,499 ft)

Population (2011)
  - Total: 85,103
  - Density: 3,780/km^{2} (9,800/sq mi)
- Time zone: UTC+5:30 (IST)
- PIN: 431513
- Telephone code: 02456
- Vehicle registration: MH-38
- Official language: Marathi
- Website: www.hingoli.nic.in

Hingoli is a city and a municipal council in Hingoli district in the Indian state of Maharashtra

== Description ==
Hingoli is a city and a municipal council in Hingoli district in the Indian state of Maharashtra. Hingoli is located at 19.72°N 77.15°E.

== Demographics ==
Religions in Hingoli City (2011)
Religion	Percent
Hinduism	53.41%
Islam	33.47%
Buddhism	10.63%
Jainism	2.03%
Other or not stated	0.46%

Hingoli has a population of 85,103. Hingoli has a sex ratio of 963 females per 1000 males and a literacy rate of 87.53%. 13.31% of the population are under 6 years of age. Scheduled Castes and Scheduled Tribes make up 14.67% and 3.50% of the population respectively.

Language in Hingoli City (2011)
1. Marathi (53.7%)
2. Hindi (23.8%)
3. Urdu (17.3%)
4. Marwari (2.59%)
5. Other (2.67%)

At the time of the 2011 census, 53.72% of the population spoke Marathi, 23.75% Hindi, 17.27% Urdu and 2.59% Marwari as their first language.

== Notable sites ==
The following temples are of interest for their architecture:

- Chintamani Ganpati Temple, Marwadi Galli
- Pola Maruti Temple, Mangalwara
- Jaleshwar Mahadev Temple (present in the lake)
- Shri Datta Mandir, Mangalwara
- Dakshinmukhi Hanuman Temple, Khatkali

Other locations include:

- Aundha Nagnath Temple
- Sant Namdev Sansthan
- Mallinath Digambar Jain Mandir
- Siddheshwar Dam
- Bahubali Statue, Pusegaon

== Rail transport ==
Hingoli Railway Station is a railway station on Purna-Akola section of Nanded Division of South Central Railway.
