= Hingoli district =

Coordinates: 19.7167°N 77.15°E

- District of Maharashtra
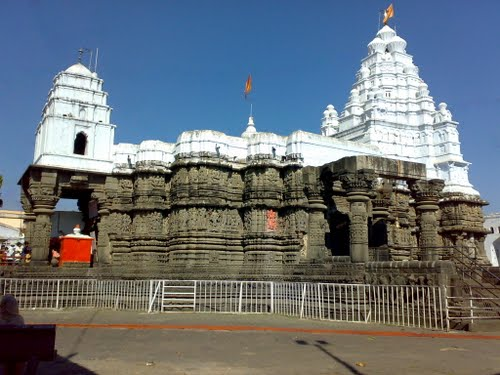
- Aundha Nagnath Temple
- Interactive map of Hingoli district
- Country: India
- State: Maharashtra
- Division: Aurangabad
- Headquarters: Hingoli
- Tehsils: Hingoli, Kalamnuri, Sengaon, Aundha Nagnath, Basmath

Government
  - Body: Hingoli Zilla Parishad
  - Guardian Minister: Abdul Sattar Abdul Nabi (Cabinet Minister Mha)
  - President Zilla Parishad: President Mr. Ganaji Belle; Vice President Mr. Manish Akhre
  - District Collector: Shri. Jitendra Papalkar (IAS)
  - CEO Zilla Parishad: Mrs. Anjali Ramesh (IAS)
  - MPs: Nagesh Patil (Hingoli)

Area
  - Total: 4,526 km^{2} (1,747 sq mi)

Population (2011)
  - Total: 1,177,345
  - Density: 260.1/km^{2} (673.7/sq mi)
  - Urban: 15.60
- Time zone: UTC+05:30 (IST)
- Website: hingoli.nic.in

Hingoli district (Marathi pronunciation: [ɦiŋɡoliː]) is an administrative district in the state of Maharashtra in India. The district is headquartered at Hingoli. The district occupies an area of 4,526 km^{2} and has a population of 11,77,345 of which 15.60% were urban (as of 2011). Hingoli was actually known as the Nizams military base as it was bordered with Vidharbha. In that era military troops, hospitals, veterinary hospital were in operation from Hingoli. Being a military base the city was one of the important and famous places of the Hyderabad state. One of the twelve Jyotirlinga shrines, the Aundha Nagnath is located in Hingoli district about 25 km south-west from district headquarter.

As of 2011 it is the third least populous district of Maharashtra (out of 36), after Sindhudurg and Gadchiroli.

== Officer ==
=== Members of Parliament ===
- Nagesh Patil (SHS(UBT))
  (Hingoli)

=== Guardian Minister ===
Guardian Minister Hingoli
- पालकमंत्री हिंगोली
- Emblem of India
- Incumbent; Abdul Sattar Abdul Nabi since 27 September 2022
- Style: The Honourable
- Appointer: Chief Minister of Maharashtra
- Term length: 5 years / No time limit
- Website: hingoli.gov.in/en/

==== list of Guardian Minister ====
| Name | Term of office |
|---|---|
| Dilip Kamble | 31 October 2014 - 8 November 2019 |
| Varsha Gaikwad | 9 January 2020 - 29 June 2022 |
| Abdul Sattar Abdul Nabi | 27 September 2022 - Incumbent |

=== District Magistrate/Collector ===
District Magistrate / Collector Hingoli
- जिल्हाधिकारी तथा जिल्हदंडाधिकरी हिंगोली
- Emblem of India
- Incumbent; Shri. Jitendra Papalkar (IAS) since 2018
- Residence: At Hingoli district
- Appointer: Government of Maharashtra
- Term length: No time limit
- Website: hingoli.gov.in/en/

==== list of District Magistrate / Collector ====
| Name | Term of office |
|---|---|
| Shri. Rahul Gupta (IAS) | 2024 - Incumbent |

== History ==
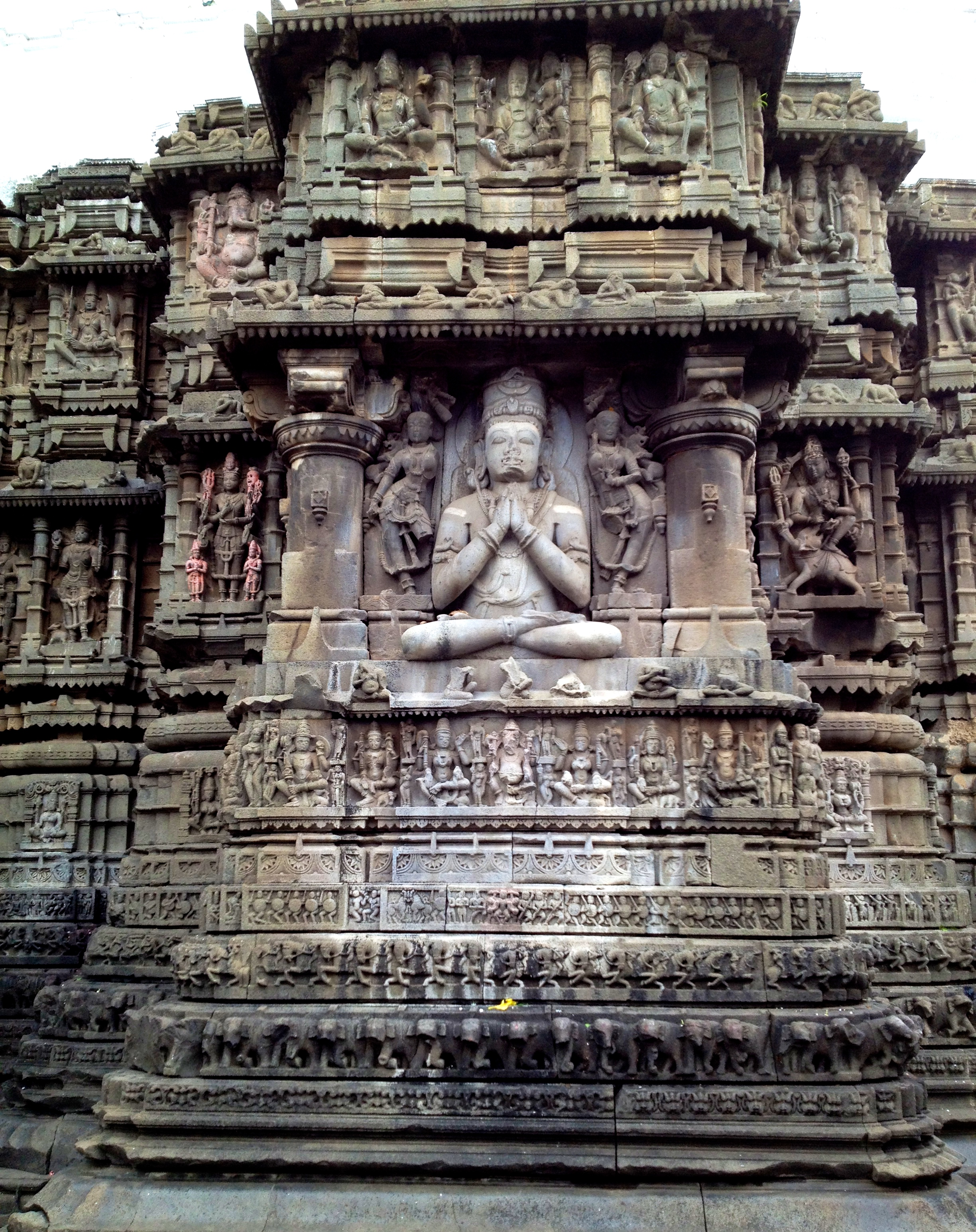
Aundha Nagnath Temple

In 1853, after the administration of the province was assigned to the British East India Company by the Nizam following a treaty, it was divided into two districts, South Berar with its headquarters at Hingoli, and North Berar with its headquarters at Buldana. Both were placed under a deputy commissioner. After the Indian Rebellion of 1857, Hingoli and its adjoining areas were restored to the Nizam and the province was reconstituted into two districts, East Berar with its headquarters at Amravati, and West Berar with its headquarters at Akola.

The territory of the present district became part of Bombay state in 1956 and Maharashtra state in 1960 as part of Parbhani district. This district was carved out from Parbhani district on 1 May 1999 with five own tehsils: Hingoli, Kalamanuri, Sengaon, Aundha Naganath, and Basamat.

== Geography ==
Hingoli is situated at the northern part of Marathwada in Maharashtra. Borders of Hingoli are surrounded by districts Washim and Yavatmal in northern side, Parbhani in western side, and Nanded at south-eastern side. There are two medium-sized dams present on both East and West sides of the district namely Isapur dam and Yeldari dam, Isapur dam provides water to irrigation purpose whereas Yeldari dam caters to irrigation as well as production of hydroelectricity. One minor dam named Siddheshwar also used for irrigation purpose in district.

== Demographics ==
Historical population
| Year | Pop. | ±% p.a. |
|---|---|---|
| 1901 | 226,384 | — |
| 1911 | 272,785 | +1.88% |
| 1921 | 267,991 | −0.18% |
| 1931 | 298,807 | +1.09% |
| 1941 | 319,200 | +0.66% |
| 1951 | 352,856 | +1.01% |
| 1961 | 430,986 | +2.02% |
| 1971 | 533,595 | +2.16% |
| 1981 | 655,199 | +2.07% |
| 1991 | 823,931 | +2.32% |
| 2001 | 987,160 | +1.82% |
| 2011 | 1,177,345 | +1.78% |

Religions in Hingoli district (2011)
| Religion | Percent |
| Hinduism | 73.32% |
| Buddhism | 15.01% |
| Islam | 10.83% |
| Jainism | 0.45% |
| Other or not stated | 0.39% |

As of the 2011 Census of India, Hingoli district has a population of 1,177,345, roughly equal to the nation of Timor-Leste or the US state of Rhode Island. This gives it a ranking of 401st in India (out of a total of 640). The district has a population density of 244 inhabitants per square kilometre (630/sq mi) . Its population growth rate over the decade 2001-2011 was 19.43%. Hingoli has a sex ratio of 942 females for every 1000 males, and a literacy rate of 78.17%. 15.18% of the population lives in urban areas. Scheduled Castes and Scheduled Tribes make up 15.51% and 9.51% of the population respectively.

Languages in Hingoli district (2011)
1. Marathi (83.5%)
2. Urdu (6.86%)
3. Hindi (4.81%)
4. Lambadi (3.25%)
5. Others (1.55%)

At the time of the 2011 Census of India, 83.53% of the population in the district spoke Marathi, 6.86% Urdu, 4.81% Hindi and 3.25% Lambadi as their first language.

== Governance ==
This district is divided into two sub-divisions, which are further divided into five talukas. Hingoli sub-division is divided into three talukas: Hingoli, Kalamnuri and Sengaon. Basmath sub-division is divided into two talukas: Aundha and Basmath.

There are three Vidhan Sabha constituencies in this district: Basmath, Kalamnuri and Hingoli. All three are part of Hingoli Lok Sabha constituency.

== Economy ==
In 2006 the Ministry of Panchayati Raj named Hingoli one of the country's 250 most backward districts (out of a total of 640). It is one of the twelve districts in Maharashtra currently receiving funds from the Backward Regions Grant Fund Programme (BRGF).

== Places of interest ==
=== Hindu temples and shrines ===
Some of the notable Hindu temples are as follows:

- Mallinath Digambar Jain Temple, Shirad Shahpur
- Aundha Nagnath is one of the twelve jyotirlingas from Hindu mythology. It is situated in the town of same name, Aundha, in Hingoli district. It is only jyotirling in India is in sanctum or garbhagruha.
- Tulja Devi Sansthan, Ghota
- Sant Namdev Sansthan Narsi, Narsi
- Tulja Bhavani Devi Temple, or Tulaja Devi Sansthan, Kalamnuri
- Jaleshwar Mahadev Temple (built in the lake), Hingoli
- Shri Datta Mandir, Mangalwara, Hingoli
- Shree Sidhnath Temple Gangalwadi, Hingoli

== Villages ==
- Jaipur

== See also ==
- Make in Maharashtra
- Tourism in Marathwada
