= Akola Lok Sabha constituency =

Lok Sabha constituency in Maharashtra

Coordinates: 20°42′32.09″N 76°59′47.73″E

Akola
- Lok Sabha constituency
- Akola Lok Sabha Constituency map

Constituency details
- Country: India
- Region: Western India
- State: Maharashtra
- Assembly constituencies: Akot; Balapur; Akola West; Akola East; Murtizapur; Risod
- Established: 1952
- Total electors: 18,90,814
- Reservation: None

Member of Parliament
- 18th Lok Sabha
- Incumbent Anup Dhotre
- Party: BJP
- Elected year: 2024
- Preceded by: Sanjay Dhotre (2019) BJP

Akola Lok Sabha constituency is one of the 48 Lok Sabha (parliamentary) constituencies in Maharashtra, currently represented by Anup Dhotre.

== Assembly segments ==
Presently, after the implementation of the Presidential notification on delimitation in 2008, Akola Lok Sabha constituency comprises six Vidhan Sabha (legislative assembly) segments. These segments (with their constituency numbers and reservation status) are:

| No | Name | District | Member | Party | Leading (in 2024) |
|---|---|---|---|---|---|
| 28 | Akot | Akola | Prakash Bharasakle | BJP | BJP |
| 29 | Balapur | Akola | Nitin Deshmukh | SS(UBT) | INC |
| 30 | Akola West | Akola | Sajid Khan Pathan | INC | INC |
| 31 | Akola East | Akola | Randhir Savarkar | BJP | BJP |
| 32 | Murtizapur(SC) | Akola | Harish Pimple | BJP | BJP |
| 33 | Risod | Washim | Amit Zanak | INC | BJP |

== Members of Parliament ==
| Year | Name | Party |
|---|---|---|
| 1952 | Gopalrao Khedkar | Indian National Congress |
| 1952 | Laxman Bhatkar | Indian National Congress |
| 1957 | Gopalrao Khedkar | Indian National Congress |
| 1957 | Laxman Bhatkar | Indian National Congress |
| 1960^ | T. S. Patil | Indian National Congress |
| 1962 | Mohammad Mohibbul Haq | Indian National Congress |
| 1967 | K.M. Asghar Husain | Indian National Congress |
| 1971 | K.M. Asghar Husain | Indian National Congress |
| 1972^ | Vasant Sathe | Indian National Congress |
| 1977 | Vasant Sathe | Indian National Congress |
| 1980 | Madhusudan Vairale | Indian National Congress |
| 1984 | Madhusudan Vairale | Indian National Congress |
| 1989 | Pandurang Fundkar | Bhartiya Janata Party |
| 1991 | Pandurang Fundkar | Bhartiya Janata Party |
| 1996 | Pandurang Fundkar | Bhartiya Janata Party |
| 1998 | Prakash Ambedkar | Republican Party of India |
| 1999 | Prakash Ambedkar | Bharipa Bahujan Mahasangh |
| 2004 | Sanjay Dhotre | Bhartiya Janata Party |
| 2009 | Sanjay Dhotre | Bhartiya Janata Party |
| 2014 | Sanjay Dhotre | Bhartiya Janata Party |
| 2019 | Sanjay Dhotre | Bhartiya Janata Party |
| 2024 | Anup Dhotre | Bhartiya Janata Party |

^ by-poll

== Election results ==
=== 2024 ===
2024 Indian general elections: Akola
| Party | Candidate | Votes | % | ±% |
|---|---|---|---|---|
| BJP | Anup Sanjay Dhotre | 457,030 | 38.96 | ▼10.57 |
| INC | Abhay Kashinath Patil | 416,404 | 35.50 | ▲10.59 |
| VBA | Prakash Ambedkar | 276,747 | 23.59 | ▼1.32 |
| NOTA | None of the Above | 5,783 | 0.49 | ▼0.30 |
| INL | Adv Najib Shaikh | 3,300 | 0.28 | N/A |
| BSP | Kashinath Vishwanath Dhamode | 2,760 | 0.24 | N/A |
| Majority | | 40,626 | 3.46 | ▼21.16 |
| Turnout | | 11,73,072 | 62.04 | ▲1.98 |
| BJP gain from INC | | Swing | | |

=== General elections 2019 ===
2019 Indian general elections: Akola
| Party | Candidate | Votes | % | ±% |
|---|---|---|---|---|
| BJP | Sanjay Dhotre | 554,444 | 49.53 | +2.89 |
| VBA | Prakash Ambedkar | 2,75,596 | 24.91 | New |
| INC | Hidayatullah Barakatullah Patel | 2,54,370 | 22.72 | −3.17 |
| NOTA | None of the Above | 8,866 | 0.79 | +0.16 |
| Majority | | 2,75,596 | 24.62 | |
| Turnout | | 11,20,185 | 60.06 | |
| BJP gain from VBA | | Swing | | |

=== General elections 2014 ===
2014 Indian general elections: Akola
| Party | Candidate | Votes | % | ±% |
|---|---|---|---|---|
| BJP | Sanjay Shamrao Dhotre | 456,472 | 46.64 | |
| INC | Hidayatulla Barkatulla Patel | 2,53,356 | 25.89 | |
| BBM | Prakash Yashwant Ambedkar | 2,38,776 | 24.40 | |
| AAP | Ajay Panjabrao Hingankar | 8,076 | 0.83 | |
| BSP | Bhai B. C. Kamble | 7,858 | 0.80 | |
| NOTA | None of the Above | 6,206 | 0.63 | |
| Majority | | 2,03,116 | 20.75 | |
| Turnout | | 9,78,630 | 58.51 | |
| BJP gain from INC | | Swing | | |

=== General elections 2009 ===
2009 Indian general elections: Akola
| Party | Candidate | Votes | % | ±% |
|---|---|---|---|---|
| BJP | Sanjay Dhotre | 287,526 | 38.91 | |
| BBM | Prakash Ambedkar | 2,22,678 | 30.13 | |
| INC | Babasaheb Dhabekar | 1,82,776 | 24.73 | |
| Majority | | 64,848 | 8.78 | |
| Turnout | | 7,38,955 | 49.91 | |
| BJP gain from BBM | | Swing | | |

== See also ==
- Buldhana Lok Sabha constituency (1951 elections as Buldhana Akola Lok Sabha constituency electing two seats)
- Khamgaon Lok Sabha constituency (1962,1967,1971 elections to 3rd,4th,5th Lok Sabha)
- Washim Lok Sabha constituency (1977 to 2004 elections for 6th to 14th Lok Sabha)
- Akola district
- Washim district
- List of constituencies of the Lok Sabha
