= Medshi Assembly constituency =

Constituency of the Maharashtra legislative assembly in India

Medshi
- Former constituency for the Maharashtra Legislative Assembly

Constituency details
- Country: India
- Region: Western India
- State: Maharashtra
- Established: 1967
- Abolished: 2008
- Total electors: 172,878

Medshi Assembly constituency was an assembly constituency in the India state of Maharashtra.

== Members of the Legislative Assembly ==
Election	Member	Party
1967	Ramrao Gopalrao Zanak	Indian National Congress
1972	Ramrao Gopalrao Zanak	Indian National Congress
1978	Shinde Vitthalrao Kondaji	Indian National Congress
1980	Ramraoji Gopalrao Zanak	Indian National Congress
1982 By-election	G. K. Kundlikrao	Indian National Congress
1985	Subhash Ramraoji Zanka	Indian National Congress
1990	Subhash Ramraoji Zanka	Indian National Congress
1995	Subhash Ramraoji Zanka	Indian National Congress
1999	Vijay Tulshiramji Jadhao	Bharatiya Janata Party
2004	Vijay Tulshiramji Jadhao	Bharatiya Janata Party
2008 onwards : See Risod
2009	Subhash Ramraoji Zanka	Indian National Congress
2014	Amit Zanak	Indian National Congress
2019	Amit Zanak	Indian National Congress
2024	Amit Zanak	Indian National Congress

== Election results ==
=== Assembly Election 2004 ===
2004 Maharashtra Legislative Assembly election : Medshi
Party	Candidate	Votes	%	±%
BJP	Jadhao Vijay Tulshiram	38,525	32.79%	▼11.91
Independent	Dr. Ingole Arun Gyanuji	37,997	32.34%	New
INC	Sarnaik Diliprao Jijebarao	15,481	13.17%	▼25.36
BBM	Rajurkar Ajaysingh Vijaysingh	6,355	5.41%	New
BSP	Dahatre Suryaprakash Bhagwanrao	4,692	3.99%	New
Lok Rajya Party	Giri Arvind Ganpat	3,838	3.27%	New
Independent	Ganesh Ashruji Gawali	2,724	2.32%	New
Margin of victory		528	0.45%	▼5.72
Turnout		117,507	67.96%	▲2.26
Registered electors		172,878		▲11.87
BJP hold		Swing	▼11.91	

=== Assembly Election 1999 ===
1999 Maharashtra Legislative Assembly election : Medshi
Party	Candidate	Votes	%	±%
BJP	Vijay Tulshiramji Jadhao	45,389	44.70%	▲27.11
INC	Zanak (Patil) Subhash Ramraoji	39,126	38.53%	▲13.45
NCP	Khadse Babarao Sahebrao	6,161	6.07%	New
Independent	Rathod Vasantrao Gobra	1,698	1.67%	New
Independent	Tayde Pandurang Mahadeo	726	0.71%	New
Independent	Dahatre Suryaprakash Bhagwanrao	642	0.63%	New
Margin of victory		6,263	6.17%	▲5.05
Turnout		101,547	61.28%	▼11.16
Registered electors		154,539		▲6.71
BJP gain from INC		Swing	▲19.62	

=== Assembly Election 1995 ===
1995 Maharashtra Legislative Assembly election : Medshi
Party	Candidate	Votes	%	±%
INC	Subhash Ramraoji Zanak (Patil)	27,923	25.08%	▼9.26
BBM	Dr. Dnyaneshwar Keshavrao Shewale	26,676	23.96%	New
BJP	Vijay Tulshiram Jadhao	19,579	17.59%	New
Independent	Pundlikrao Ramji Gawali	14,564	13.08%	New
JD	Suryaprakash Bhagwanrao Dahatre	8,964	8.05%	▼2.78
Independent	Limbaji Saduji Gabahane	6,592	5.92%	New
Margin of victory		1,247	1.12%	▼8.71
Turnout		111,329	74.77%	▲9.23
Registered electors		144,822		▲11.16
INC hold		Swing	▼9.26	

=== Assembly Election 1990 ===
1990 Maharashtra Legislative Assembly election : Medshi
Party	Candidate	Votes	%	±%
INC	Zanak Subhash Ramraoji	30,261	34.34%	▼17.25
SS	Pundlikrao Ramji Gawali	21,598	24.51%	New
Independent	Gabahane Limbaji Saduji	19,091	21.66%	New
JD	Kale Damodar Ramji	9,545	10.83%	New
Independent	Ghuge Sahebrao Uttamrao	3,005	3.41%	New
Independent	Gaikwad Uttam Narayan	784	0.89%	New
Margin of victory		8,663	9.83%	▼5.39
Turnout		88,125	66.47%	▲4.44
Registered electors		130,285		▲20.58
INC hold		Swing	▼17.25	

=== Assembly Election 1985 ===
1985 Maharashtra Legislative Assembly election : Medshi
Party	Candidate	Votes	%	±%
INC	Zanak Subhash Ramraoji	35,235	51.59%	New
Independent	Badhe Shesharao Bhaurao	24,837	36.37%	New
IC(S)	Arun Gyanuji Ingole	6,350	9.30%	New
Independent	Chothamal Gowardhan Zaduji	600	0.88%	New
Margin of victory		10,398	15.23%	
Turnout		68,294	62.03%	
Registered electors		108,053		
INC hold		Swing		

=== Assembly By-election 1982 ===
1982 Maharashtra Legislative Assembly by-election : Medshi
Party	Candidate	Votes	%	±%
INC	G. K. Kundlikrao	29,728		New
IC(S)	S. V. Kondji	26,527 #DIV/0!		New
Margin of victory		3,201		
INC gain from INC(I)		Swing		

=== Assembly Election 1980 ===
1980 Maharashtra Legislative Assembly election : Medshi
Party	Candidate	Votes	%	±%
INC(I)	Zanak Ramraoji Gopalrao	40,173	65.09%	▲14.54
INC(U)	Shinde Vitthalrao Kondaji	10,669	17.29%	New
RPI(K)	Wankhade Jotiram Namdeo	4,795	7.77%	New
BJP	Tiwari Balkisan Asaram	3,738	6.06%	New
Independent	Asankar Lingappa Dattatraya	697	1.13%	New
Margin of victory		29,504	47.80%	▲23.84
Turnout		61,721	61.92%	▼16.04
Registered electors		97,010		▲6.87
INC(I) hold		Swing	▲14.54	

=== Assembly Election 1978 ===
1978 Maharashtra Legislative Assembly election : Medshi
Party	Candidate	Votes	%	±%
INC(I)	Shinde Vitthalrao Kondaji	36,552	50.55%	New
INC	Zanak Ramraoji Gopalrao	19,224	26.58%	▼56.67
JP	Jadhao Tulshiram Zelaji	6,931	9.58%	New
Independent	Zalke Sitaram Vishram	5,730	7.92%	New
Independent	Medshikar Shriniwasrao Sampatrao	1,167	1.61%	New
Margin of victory		17,328	23.96%	▼51.08
Turnout		72,313	77.13%	▲20.05
Registered electors		90,778		▲2.29
INC(I) gain from INC		Swing	▼32.71	

=== Assembly Election 1972 ===
1972 Maharashtra Legislative Assembly election : Medshi
Party	Candidate	Votes	%	±%
INC	Ramrao Gopalrao Zanak	44,040	83.26%	▲23.52
ABJS	Shamrao Uttamrao Vaidya	4,346	8.22%	New
Independent	Sitaram Sagnaji Dhabe	2,056	3.89%	New
Margin of victory		39,694	75.04%	▲48.26
Turnout		52,897	56.84%	▼13.75
Registered electors		88,746		▲17.33
INC hold		Swing		

=== Assembly Election 1967 ===
1967 Maharashtra Legislative Assembly election : Medshi
Party	Candidate	Votes	%	±%
INC	Ramrao Gopalrao Zanak	33,149	59.74%	New
RPI	J. D. Rajurkar	18,291	32.96%	New
Independent	B. M. Khandare	419	0.76%	New
Independent	K. G. Wakode	384	0.69%	New
Margin of victory		14,858	26.78%	
Turnout		55,488	69.45%	
Registered electors		75,639		
INC win (new seat)				
