= Risod Assembly constituency =

Constituency of the Maharashtra legislative assembly in India

Coordinates: 19.98°N 76.78°E

Risod
- Constituency No. 33 for the Maharashtra Legislative Assembly

Constituency details
- Country: India
- Region: Western India
- State: Maharashtra
- District: Washim
- Lok Sabha constituency: Akola
- Established: 2008
- Total electors: 324,918
- Reservation: None

Member of Legislative Assembly
- 15th Maharashtra Legislative Assembly
- Incumbent Amit Subhashrao Zanak
- Party: INC
- Alliance: MVA
- Elected year: 2024

Risod Assembly constituency is one of the 288 constituencies of Maharashtra Vidhan Sabha (Legislative Assembly) and one of the three which are located in Washim district formed in 2008.

Risod is part of Akola Lok Sabha constituency along with five other Vidhan Sabha constituencies, namely Akot, Balapur, Akola West, Akola East and Murtizapur, from Akola district.

== Members of the Legislative Assembly ==
Election	Member	Party
1967	Ramrao Gopalrao Zanak	Indian National Congress
1972	Ramrao Gopalrao Zanak	Indian National Congress
1978	Shinde Vitthalrao Kondaji	Indian National Congress
1980	Ramraoji Gopalrao Zanak	Indian National Congress
1982 By-election	G. K. Kundlikrao	Indian National Congress
1985	Subhash Ramraoji Zanak	Indian National Congress
1990	Subhash Ramraoji Zanak	Indian National Congress
1995	Subhash Ramraoji Zanak	Indian National Congress
1999	Vijay Tulshiramji Jadhao	Bharatiya Janata Party
2004	Vijay Tulshiramji Jadhao	Bharatiya Janata Party
Before 2008: See Medshi Assembly constituency
2009	Subhash Ramraoji Zanak	Indian National Congress
2014	Amit Zanak	Indian National Congress
2019	Amit Zanak	Indian National Congress
2024	Amit Zanak	Indian National Congress

== Election results ==
=== Assembly Election 2024 ===
2024 Maharashtra Legislative Assembly election : Risod
Party	Candidate	Votes	%	±%
INC	Amit Subhashrao Zanak	76,809	33.44%	▼0.83
Independent	Anantrao Vithhalrao Deshmukh	70,673	30.77%	New
SS	Bhavana Gawali	60,693	26.42%	▲15.10
VBA	Prashant Sudhir Goley	15,907	6.93%	▼9.98
RSPS	Dipak Shriram Tirke	1,738	0.76%	New
NOTA	None of the Above	1,271	0.55%	▼0.20
Margin of victory		6,136	2.67%	▲1.62
Turnout		230,971	71.09%	▲4.69
Total valid votes		229,700		
Registered electors		324,918		
INC hold		Swing	▼0.83	

=== Assembly Election 2019 ===
2019 Maharashtra Legislative Assembly election : Risod
Party	Candidate	Votes	%	±%
INC	Amit Subhashrao Zanak	69,875	34.27%	▼4.63
Independent	Anantrao Vithhalrao Deshmukh	67,734	33.22%	New
VBA	Dilip Rambhau Jadhao	34,475	16.91%	New
SS	Sanap Vishwnath Ashruji	23,075	11.32%	▲1.21
NOTA	None of the Above	1,534	0.75%	▼0.55
Independent	Vishwanath Tukaram Shevale	1,405	0.69%	New
Margin of victory		2,141	1.05%	▼8.17
Turnout		205,512		▲3.42
Total valid votes		203,883		
Registered electors		308,878		
INC hold		Swing	▼4.63	

=== Assembly Election 2014 ===
2014 Maharashtra Legislative Assembly election : Risod
Party	Candidate	Votes	%	±%
INC	Amit Subhashrao Zanak	70,939	38.91%	▲6.75
BJP	Jadhav Vijay Tulsiram	54,131	29.69%	▲6.51
SS	Sanap Vishwanath Aashruji	18,425	10.10%	New
BBM	Kalapad Ramkrishna Sakharamji	15,348	8.42%	▲4.04
MNS	Raju Patil Raje	12,396	6.80%	▲3.56
NCP	Babarao Sahebrao Patil (Khadse)	5,811	3.19%	New
NOTA	None of the Above	2,374	1.30%	New
BSP	Devadhe Patil Subhash Uttamrao	1,452	0.80%	▼0.77
Margin of victory		16,808	9.22%	▲7.31
Turnout		184,735		▼0.82
Total valid votes		182,339		
Registered electors		291,327		
INC hold		Swing	▲6.75	

=== Assembly Election 2009 ===
2009 Maharashtra Legislative Assembly election : Risod
Party	Candidate	Votes	%	±%
INC	Subhash Zanak	51,234	32.15%	New
Independent	Anantrao Vithhalrao Deshmukh	48,194	30.24%	New
BJP	Jadhav Vijay Tulsiram	36,940	23.18%	New
BBM	Kayande Laxmanrao Sambhaji	6,977	4.38%	New
MNS	Bharat Uddhavrao Patil	5,153	3.23%	New
Independent	Adv. Sanjay Shioram Ingole	3,407	2.14%	New
BSP	Wankhede Avinash Baliram	2,496	1.57%	New
Margin of victory		3,040	1.91%	
Turnout		159,442	63.44%	
Total valid votes		159,351		
Registered electors		251,309		
INC win (new seat)				

== See also ==
- Risod
- List of constituencies of Maharashtra Vidhan Sabha
