= Murtizapur Assembly constituency =

Constituency of the Maharashtra legislative assembly in India

Coordinates: 20.73°N 77.36°E

Murtizapur
- Constituency No. 32 for the Maharashtra Legislative Assembly

Constituency details
- Country: India
- Region: Western India
- State: Maharashtra
- District: Akola
- Lok Sabha constituency: Akola
- Established: 1951
- Total electors: 311,175
- Reservation: SC

Member of Legislative Assembly
- 15th Maharashtra Legislative Assembly
- Incumbent Harish Marotiappa Pimple
- Party: BJP
- Alliance: NDA
- Elected year: 2024

Murtizapur Assembly constituency is one of the 288 constituencies of Maharashtra Vidhan Sabha and one of the five which are located in Akola district. It is reserved for a Scheduled Caste candidate.

It is a part of Akola Lok Sabha constituency along with five other assembly constituencies, viz Akot, Balapur, Akola West, and Akola East and Risod from the Washim district.

As per orders of Delimitation of Parliamentary and Assembly constituencies Order, 2008, No. 32 Murtizapur Assembly constituency is composed of the following: 1. Murtizapur Tehsil, 2. Barshitakli Tehsil, and 3. Akola Tehsil (Part), Revenue Circle - Kurankhed. of the district.

== Members of the Legislative Assembly ==
Year	Member	Party
1952	Shamrao Deorao Dhotre	Indian National Congress
1957	Dagadu Zangoji Palaspagar(Sc)	Indian National Congress
1957	Kusumtai Wamanrao Korpe	Indian National Congress
1962	Kusumtai Wamanrao Korpe	Indian National Congress
1967	Pratibhadevi Tidke	Indian National Congress
1972	Pratibhadevi Tidke	Indian National Congress
1978	Dhyandeorao Mukundrao Thakare	Indian National Congress (I)
1980	Suresh Walji Kanot	Indian National Congress (I)
1985	Suhas Bhagwantrao Tidke	Indian National Congress
1990	Makhram Banduji Pawar	Independent politician
1995	Motiram Lahane	Bharatiya Janata Party
1999	Sanjay Shamrao Dhotre	Bharatiya Janata Party
2004	Tukaram Bidkar	Nationalist Congress Party
2009	Harish Pimple	Bharatiya Janata Party
2014	Harish Pimple	Bharatiya Janata Party
2019	Harish Pimple	Bharatiya Janata Party
2024	Harish Pimple	Bharatiya Janata Party

== Election results ==
=== Assembly Election 2024 ===
2024 Maharashtra Legislative Assembly election : Murtizapur
Party	Candidate	Votes	%	±%
BJP	Harish Pimple	91,820	44.17%	▲10.01
NCP-SP	Samrat Dongardive	55,956	26.92%	New
VBA	Sugat Gyaneshwar Waghmare	49,608	23.87%	▼9.20
AIMIM	Surwade Samrat Manikrao	3,201	1.54%	New
Independent	Ravi Rameshchandra Rathi	2,764	1.33%	New
NOTA	None of the above	886	0.43%	▼0.27
Margin of victory		35,864	17.25%	▲16.15
Turnout		208,754	67.09%	▲12.45
Total valid votes		207,868		
Registered electors		311,175		▼3.31
BJP hold		Swing	▲10.01	

=== Assembly Election 2019 ===
2019 Maharashtra Legislative Assembly election : Murtizapur
Party	Candidate	Votes	%	±%
BJP	Harish Pimple	59,527	34.16%	▼0.61
VBA	Awachar Pratibha Prabhakar	57,617	33.07%	New
NCP	Ravikumar Rameshchandra Rathi	41,155	23.62%	▲18.80
PHJSP	Rajkumar Narayanrao Nachane	8,764	5.03%	New
Independent	Ashish Shankarappa Bare	2,445	1.40%	New
NOTA	None of the above	1,225	0.70%	▲0.30
Margin of victory		1,910	1.10%	▼7.16
Turnout		175,830	54.64%	▲1.18
Total valid votes		174,244		
Registered electors		321,817		▲9.83
BJP hold		Swing	▼0.61	

=== Assembly Election 2014 ===
2014 Maharashtra Legislative Assembly election : Murtizapur
Party	Candidate	Votes	%	±%
BJP	Harish Pimple	54,226	34.77%	▼4.36
BBM	Rahul Shesharao Dongare	41,338	26.51%	▼0.68
SS	Mahadev Bapurao Gawale	24,486	15.70%	New
INC	Ingle Shravan Shekoji	18,044	11.57%	New
NCP	Dr. Sudhir Sahebrao Vilhekar	7,520	4.82%	▼22.10
Independent	Sandip Daulatrao Sarnaik	3,158	2.03%	New
MNS	Rama Supadaji Umbarkar	973	0.62%	New
BSP	Arun Anandrao Bangare	951	0.61%	▼0.82
NOTA	None of the above	622	0.40%	New
Margin of victory		12,888	8.26%	▼3.68
Turnout		156,626	53.46%	▲3.46
Total valid votes		155,940		
Registered electors		293,003		▲13.88
BJP hold		Swing	▼4.36	

=== Assembly Election 2009 ===
2009 Maharashtra Legislative Assembly election : Murtizapur
Party	Candidate	Votes	%	±%
BJP	Harish Pimple	50,333	39.13%	▲9.11
BBM	Palaspagar Baldev Sukhaev	34,975	27.19%	▲5.22
NCP	Awachar Pratibha Prabhakar	34,631	26.92%	▼13.17
Independent	Prof. Mukund Vithalrao Khaire	4,016	3.12%	New
BSP	Dhurdev Wasudev Narayanrao	1,834	1.43%	▲0.21
Margin of victory		15,358	11.94%	▲1.87
Turnout		128,651	50.00%	▼13.89
Total valid votes		128,644		
Registered electors		257,296		▲38.51
BJP gain from NCP		Swing	▼0.96	

=== Assembly Election 2004 ===
2004 Maharashtra Legislative Assembly election : Murtizapur
Party	Candidate	Votes	%	±%
NCP	Birkad Tukaram Haribhau	47,580	40.09%	New
BJP	Kambe Raosaheb Dattuji	35,633	30.02%	▼17.23
BBM	Ingle Shravan Shekoji	26,070	21.97%	▼20.01
SP	Principal Madhukar Pawar	5,387	4.54%	New
Independent	Sontakke Arun Vitthal	1,468	1.24%	New
BSP	Ganesh Omkarmal Heda	1,451	1.22%	New
Margin of victory		11,947	10.07%	▲4.80
Turnout		118,689	63.89%	▲8.76
Total valid votes		118,685		
Registered electors		185,758		▲9.66
NCP gain from BJP		Swing	▼7.16	

=== Assembly Election 1999 ===
1999 Maharashtra Legislative Assembly election : Murtizapur
Party	Candidate	Votes	%	±%
BJP	Sanjay Dhotre	42,173	47.25%	▲18.09
BBM	Rathod Hirasing Ramu	37,473	41.98%	New
Independent	Shirsat. B. R	5,816	6.52%	New
Independent	Laxman Sakharam Sarkate	2,610	2.92%	New
Independent	Gawande Krishnarao Kashirao	805	0.90%	New
Margin of victory		4,700	5.27%	▲4.25
Turnout		93,389	55.13%	▼18.58
Total valid votes		89,260		
Registered electors		169,395		▲6.31
BJP hold		Swing	▲18.09	

=== Assembly Election 1995 ===
1995 Maharashtra Legislative Assembly election : Murtizapur
Party	Candidate	Votes	%	±%
BJP	Motiram Lahane	33,577	29.16%	▲0.14
BBM	Pawar Makhram Banduji	32,397	28.13%	New
INC	Babanrao Mahadeorao Daberao	16,051	13.94%	▲1.75
JD	Avvalwar Prakash Kondiram	8,843	7.68%	New
Independent	Kambe Raosaheb Dattuji	6,419	5.57%	New
Independent	Vasantrao Kambe Wakil Saheb	5,455	4.74%	New
Independent	Mir Ajhar Ali Hyder Ali	4,977	4.32%	New
Independent	Patil Vithalrao Narayanrao	907	0.79%	New
Margin of victory		1,180	1.02%	▼4.59
Turnout		117,461	73.71%	▲10.04
Total valid votes		115,159		
Registered electors		159,348		▲11.60
BJP gain from Independent		Swing	▼5.47	

=== Assembly Election 1990 ===
1990 Maharashtra Legislative Assembly election : Murtizapur
Party	Candidate	Votes	%	±%
Independent	Pawar Makhram Banduji	31,069	34.63%	New
BJP	Motiramji Udaybhanji Lahane	26,033	29.02%	▲2.57
Independent	Vasantrao Janardan Kambe (Vakil Saheb)	12,149	13.54%	New
INC	Suhas Bhagvantrao Tidke	10,933	12.19%	▼34.82
PWPI	Gawande Vijay Bhaskarrao	4,023	4.48%	New
Independent	Thakare Dnyaneshwar Mukund	1,581	1.76%	New
Margin of victory		5,036	5.61%	▼14.95
Turnout		90,904	63.67%	▲1.62
Total valid votes		89,718		
Registered electors		142,784		▲23.97
Independent gain from INC		Swing	▼12.38	

=== Assembly Election 1985 ===
1985 Maharashtra Legislative Assembly election : Murtizapur
Party	Candidate	Votes	%	±%
INC	Suhas Bhagwantrao Tidke	33,071	47.01%	New
BJP	Dhotre Sahebrao Deorao	18,606	26.45%	▲9.06
Independent	B. R. Sirsat	16,663	23.69%	New
RPI	Khandare Rambhau Bhauji	469	0.67%	▼17.54
Independent	Ingle Ganesh Bhikaji	446	0.63%	New
Independent	Parasnath R. Mishra	429	0.61%	New
Margin of victory		14,465	20.56%	▲5.85
Turnout		71,470	62.05%	▲6.89
Total valid votes		70,342		
Registered electors		115,180		▲8.43
INC gain from INC(I)		Swing	▲13.42	

=== Assembly Election 1980 ===
1980 Maharashtra Legislative Assembly election : Murtizapur
Party	Candidate	Votes	%	±%
INC(I)	Kanot Suresh Walji	19,152	33.59%	▼7.13
Independent	Kambe Vasantao Janardan	10,763	18.88%	New
RPI	Tayade Vijaykumar Babanji	10,382	18.21%	New
BJP	Lajane Ulhasrao Govindrao	9,916	17.39%	New
AIFB	Arvind Kamlakar Deshmukh	5,598	9.82%	▲8.81
Independent	Onkar Purnaji Nachane	617	1.08%	New
Independent	Pimple Basweshwarappa Kisanappa	583	1.02%	New
Margin of victory		8,389	14.71%	▲11.32
Turnout		58,594	55.16%	▼21.45
Total valid votes		57,011		
Registered electors		106,229		▲6.82
INC(I) hold		Swing	▼7.13	

=== Assembly Election 1978 ===
1978 Maharashtra Legislative Assembly election : Murtizapur
Party	Candidate	Votes	%	±%
INC(I)	Thakare Dhyandeorao Mukundrao	30,127	40.72%	New
JP	Lahane Motiramji Udebhanji	27,621	37.33%	New
INC	Dhabekar Kesharao Narayanrao	15,154	20.48%	▼33.04
AIFB	Mankar Rameshwar Jagdeorao	747	1.01%	▼16.93
Margin of victory		2,506	3.39%	▼32.11
Turnout		76,185	76.61%	▲13.64
Total valid votes		73,988		
Registered electors		99,451		▲3.75
INC(I) gain from INC		Swing	▼12.80	

=== Assembly Election 1972 ===
1972 Maharashtra Legislative Assembly election : Murtizapur
Party	Candidate	Votes	%	±%
INC	Pratibhadevi Tidke	28,373	53.52%	▲1.08
RPI	Bapurao Babanji Tayade	9,553	18.02%	▼2.54
AIFB	Motiram Shriram Kambe	9,509	17.94%	New
SSP	Ajij Mohammed Ajim	5,576	10.52%	New
Margin of victory		18,820	35.50%	▲9.24
Turnout		60,361	62.97%	▼5.54
Total valid votes		53,011		
Registered electors		95,858		▲13.96
INC hold		Swing	▲1.08	

=== Assembly Election 1967 ===
1967 Maharashtra Legislative Assembly election : Murtizapur
Party	Candidate	Votes	%	±%
INC	Pratibhadevi Tidke	27,593	52.44%	▼7.89
Independent	S. P. Pachade	13,774	26.18%	New
RPI	S. I. Meshram	10,819	20.56%	New
Independent	B. K. Ingle	429	0.82%	New
Margin of victory		13,819	26.26%	▼14.26
Turnout		57,627	68.51%	▲0.08
Total valid votes		52,615		
Registered electors		84,112		▲6.77
INC hold		Swing	▼7.89	

=== Assembly Election 1962 ===
1962 Maharashtra Legislative Assembly election : Murtizapur
Party	Candidate	Votes	%	±%
INC	Kusumtai Wamanrao Korpe	30,177	60.33%	▼0.63
RPI	Pandurang Goturam Athawale	9,908	19.81%	New
Independent	Hariram Daryaji	9,006	18.01%	New
Independent	Namya Raghunath	928	1.86%	New
Margin of victory		20,269	40.52%	▲23.03
Turnout		53,906	68.43%	▼42.26
Total valid votes		50,019		
Registered electors		78,781		▼41.48
INC hold		Swing	▲28.65	

=== Assembly Election 1957 ===
1957 Bombay State Legislative Assembly election : Murtizapur
Party	Candidate	Votes	%	±%
INC	Palaspagar Dagadu Zangoji	47,204	31.68%	▼23.34
INC	Korpe Kusum W/o Wamanrao	43,640	29.29%	▼25.73
Independent	Raut Wasudeo Khushal	21,142	14.19%	New
SCF	Sardar Motiram Kisan	19,728	13.24%	New
PSP	Polkat Shriram Narayan	6,317	4.24%	New
Independent	More Pandurang Annaji	3,720	2.50%	New
Independent	Shankarrao Sambhuji	3,717	2.49%	New
Independent	Wankhade Onkar Narsaji	3,550	2.38%	New
Margin of victory		26,062	17.49%	▼15.37
Turnout		149,018	110.69%	▲41.86
Total valid votes		149,018		
Registered electors		134,624		▲177.82
INC hold		Swing	▼23.34	

=== Assembly Election 1952 ===
1952 Hyderabad State Legislative Assembly election : Murtizapur
Party	Candidate	Votes	%	±%
INC	Shamrao Deorao Dhotre	18,353	55.02%	New
Independent	Vithalrao Narayan Jamadar	7,393	22.17%	New
Socialist	Bhagwan Hirasa Mawale	6,200	18.59%	New
SKP	P. R. Lewe	1,090	3.27%	New
Independent	Bapuraoji Narayanji Vairale	318	0.95%	New
Margin of victory		10,960	32.86%	
Turnout		33,354	68.83%	
Total valid votes		33,354		
Registered electors		48,458		
INC win (new seat)				

== See also ==
- Murtajapur
- Barshitakli
- Kurankhed
- UJALESHWAR
- CCIT
