= Akola East Assembly constituency =

Constituency of the Maharashtra legislative assembly in India

Coordinates: 20°42′32.09″N 76°59′47.73″E

Akola East
- Constituency No. 31 for the Maharashtra Legislative Assembly

Constituency details
- Country: India
- Region: Western India
- State: Maharashtra
- District: Akola
- Lok Sabha constituency: Akola
- Established: 2008
- Total electors: 355,797
- Reservation: None

Member of Legislative Assembly
- 15th Maharashtra Legislative Assembly
- Incumbent Randhir Pralhadrao Savarkar
- Party: BJP
- Alliance: NDA
- Elected year: 2024

Akola East Assembly constituency is one of the 288 constituencies of Maharashtra Vidhan Sabha and one of the five which are located in the Akola district.

It is a part of the Akola (Lok Sabha constituency) along with five other assembly constituencies, viz Akot, Balapur, Akola West, and Murtizapur (SC) and Risod from the Washim district.

As per orders of Delimitation of Parliamentary and Assembly constituencies Order, 2008, No. 31 Akola East Assembly constituency is composed of the following: Akola Tehsil (Part) - Akola (M.Corp.) (Part), Ward No 8 to 12, 31 to 37 and 54 to 55, 2. Akot Tehsil (Part), Revenue Circle-Kutasa, Chohatta, 3. Akola Tehsil (Part)-Ghusar, Palso BK., Borgaon Manju, Kapshi and Akola, Umari Pragane Balapur (CT) and Malkapur (CT). of the district.

== Members of the Legislative Assembly ==
Year	Member	Party
Before 2008: Constituency did not exist
2009	Haridas Pandhari Bhade	Bharipa Bahujan Mahasangh
2014	Randhir Savarkar	Bharatiya Janata Party
2019	Randhir Savarkar	Bharatiya Janata Party
2024	Randhir Savarkar	Bharatiya Janata Party

== Election results ==
=== Assembly Election 2024 ===
2024 Maharashtra Legislative Assembly election : Akola East
Party	Candidate	Votes	%	±%
BJP	Randhir Pralhadrao Sawarkar	108,619	49.29%	▼3.32
SS(UBT)	Gopal Alias Ashish Ramrao Datkar	58,006	26.32%	New
VBA	Dnyaneshwar Shankar Sultane	50,681	23.00%	▼16.67
NOTA	None of the Above	1,510	0.69%	▼0.56
Margin of victory		50,613	22.97%	▲10.02
Turnout		221,870	62.36%	▲6.56
Total valid votes		220,360		
Registered electors		355,797		▲3.18
BJP hold		Swing	▼3.32	

=== Assembly Election 2019 ===
2019 Maharashtra Legislative Assembly election : Akola East
Party	Candidate	Votes	%	±%
BJP	Randhir Pralhadrao Sawarkar	100,475	52.62%	▲20.59
VBA	Haridas Pandhari Bhade	75,752	39.67%	New
INC	Vivek Ramrao Paraskar	9,533	4.99%	▼0.70
NOTA	None of the Above	2,381	1.25%	New
Margin of victory		24,723	12.95%	▲11.49
Turnout		193,462	56.10%	▼0.37
Total valid votes		190,958		
Registered electors		344,835		▲14.70
BJP hold		Swing	▲20.59	

=== Assembly Election 2014 ===
2014 Maharashtra Legislative Assembly election : Akola East
Party	Candidate	Votes	%	±%
BJP	Randhir Pralhadrao Sawarkar	53,678	32.03%	New
BBM	Haridas Pandhari Bhade	51,238	30.57%	▼2.15
SS	Gopikisan Radhakisan Bajoria	35,514	21.19%	▼1.91
INC	Dr.Subhashchandra Wamanrao Korpe	9,542	5.69%	▼14.24
NCP	Shirish Vasantrao Dhotre	6,088	3.63%	New
Independent	Vijay Onkarrao Malokar	1,430	0.85%	New
NOTA	None of the Above	989	0.59%	New
Margin of victory		2,440	1.46%	▼8.17
Turnout		168,664	56.10%	▲1.91
Total valid votes		167,608		
Registered electors		300,651		▲9.33
BJP gain from BBM		Swing	▼0.69	

=== Assembly Election 2009 ===
2009 Maharashtra Legislative Assembly election : Akola East
Party	Candidate	Votes	%	±%
BBM	Haridas Pandhari Bhade	48,438	32.72%	New
SS	Gulabrao Ramrao Gawande	34,194	23.10%	New
INC	Vijay Alias Dadarao Narayanrao Mete (Patil)	29,511	19.93%	New
JSS	Vijay Omkarrao Malokar	29,065	19.63%	New
BSP	Shankar Kisanrao Ingle	1,449	0.98%	New
Independent	Sheshrao Rambhau Dongre	1,082	0.73%	New
Margin of victory		14,244	9.62%	
Turnout		148,045	53.84%	
Total valid votes		148,040		
Registered electors		274,988		
BBM win (new seat)				

== See also ==
- Akola
