= Motiram Lahane =

Indian politician (1922–2005)

Member of Parliament, Rajya Sabha
- Incumbent
- Assumed office 1978 -1980
- Constituency: Maharashtra

MLA
- In office 1995–1999
- Succeeded by: Sanjay Dhotre
- Constituency: Murtizapur

Personal details
- Born: 1922 Pinjar, Akola district, Berar Division
- Died: 11 March 2005 Pinjar
- Party: BJP
- Profession: Agriculturist

Motiram Lahane (1922 - 2005) was a politician with Bharatiya Janata Party. He was a member of Rajya Sabha from Maharashtra state during the term 14 December 1978 to 2 April 1980 as Janata Party candidate.

He entered politics as a member of Jana Sangh. He had represented Murtijapur Assembly constituency of Maharashtra State for a term from 1995 to 1999 as a member of BJP. He had earlier lost from that seat in 1978 and 1990 vidhan sabha elections. He was popularly known as Bhausaheb.

Motiram Lahane died on 11 March 2005.
