= Tukaram Bidkar =

Indian politician and actor (died 2025)

Member of the Maharashtra Legislative Assembly
- In office 2004–2009
- Preceded by: Sanjay Shamrao Dhotre
- Succeeded by: Harish Pimple
- Constituency: Murtizapur

Personal details
- Born: Maharashtra, India
- Died: 13 February 2025 Akola, Maharashtra, India
- Party: Nationalist Congress Party (before 2023); Nationalist Congress Party (Ajit Pawar) (2023–2025)
- Occupation: Politician, actor and athlete

Tukaram Bidkar (also spelled Tukaram Birkad; died 13 February 2025) was an Indian politician and actor. He was a member of the Nationalist Congress Party and served as a Member of the Maharashtra Legislative Assembly from Murtizapur Assembly constituency from 2004 to 2009. He also chaired the Vidarbha Statutory Development Board.

== Background ==
Tukaram Bidkar was born in Tolangabad, Maharashtra. He was a kabaddi player and received an award from President Giani Zail Singh. He also mentored athletes through the Jai Bajrang Vyayamshala.

Bidkar died in a traffic collision in Akola, Maharashtra, on 13 February 2025.

== Political career ==
Bidkar began his political career as a member of the Zilla Parishad. In 2004, he was elected as a Member of the Legislative Assembly (MLA) from the Murtizapur Assembly constituency. He was also appointed the chairman of the Vidarbha Statutory Development Board.

He was associated with Sharad Pawar's Nationalist Congress Party. After the Nationalist Congress Party split, he aligned with the faction led by Deputy Chief Minister Ajit Pawar.

Bidkar also served as the Vice President of the Akhil Bharatiya Mahatma Phule Samata Parishad, Maharashtra.

== Film career ==
Bidkar also appeared in Marathi films. He played a notable role in Debu, a film that he also produced, based on the life of Sant Gadge Maharaj. He later appeared in Khairlanjichya Mathyawar (2014), Zari (2017), and Tu Fakt Ho Mhan (2022). He also had a role in Aasud (2019), a Marathi film addressing farmer suicides.

=== Filmography ===
Year	Film	Notes
2010	Debu	Based on Gadge Maharaj's life; also producer
2014	Khairlanjichya Mathyawar	
2017	Zari	Also producer
2019	Aasud	
2022	Tu Fakt Ho Mhan	
