= Anantrao Vithhalrao Deshmukh =

Indian politician

Anantrao Vitthalrao Deshmukh 'भाऊसाहेब'

Minister of State Government of Maharashtra
- In office 1985–1989
- Minister: Finance & Planning * Employment Guarantee Scheme * Information & Public Relation

Member of Maharashtra Legislative Assembly
- In office 1985–1989
- Preceded by: Rathi Ramkrushna Gangaramji
- Succeeded by: Gulabrao Ramrao Gawande
- Constituency: Karanja

Member of Parliament, Lok Sabha
- In office 1989–1996
- Preceded by: Gulam Nabi Azad
- Succeeded by: Pundlikrao Gawali
- Constituency: Washim

Personal details
- Born: 19 August 1949 (age 77)
- Party: Bhartiya Janata Party (2023-Present)
- Other political affiliations: Indian National Congress (1973-2009), (2013-2019); Independent (2009-2013); Washim Zilha Jan Vikas Aghadi (2019-2023)
- Spouse: Jayashri Anantrao Deshmukh
- Children: Chaitanya Deshmukh; Nakul Deshmukh - Ex-President of Washim District Youth Congress.
- Parent: Vitthalrao Khanderao Deshmukh
- Education: Poona University, Poona (Maharashtra), B.Sc, M.Sc(Goldmedalist)
- Occupation: Politician
- Profession: Agriculturist
- Nickname: Bhausaheb

Anantrao Vitthalrao Deshmukh is an Indian politician from Maharashtra. He served as a Minister of State for Finance, Planning, Employment Guarantee Scheme, Information and Public Relations in the Government of Maharashtra. He is a member of the Bharatiya Janata Party and was previously a member of the Indian National Congress. Deshmukh is the president of Arya Shikshan Sanstha, established in 1915, which operates several educational institutions, including Bharat Madhyamik School, Bharat Prathamik School, Bharat Kanya School, Sunrise English School, Bharat Junior and Senior College in Risod, and schools in Chinchamba Pen and Chinchamba Bhar. Before the formation of Washim district, Deshmukh began his political career as a member of a Gram panchayat in 1974. In 1979, he was elected to the Zilla Parishad of Akola. He later served as president of the Akola Youth Congress in 1981 and as president of the Akola Khadi Board in 1982.

In 1985, Deshmukh was elected as a member of the Legislative Assembly of Maharashtra from the Karanja Assembly constituency. He subsequently served as a Minister of State for Finance, Employment Guarantee Scheme, Information and Public Relations in the Government of Maharashtra. Deshmukh was elected to the Lok Sabha from the Washim Lok Sabha constituency in the 1989 Indian general election and 1991 Indian general election. He has served as vice president of the Maharashtra Pradesh Congress Committee and as a member of the Indian National Congress. Deshmukh contested the 1999 Indian general election from the Yavatmal–Washim Lok Sabha constituency but was defeated. He later contested elections from the Risod Assembly constituency as an independent candidate in the 2009, 2019, and 2024 Maharashtra Assembly elections, but was unsuccessful.

In the 2009 election, Deshmukh was defeated by Subhashrao Zhanak, who had previously served as the Minister for Women and Child Development in the Government of Maharashtra. In the 2019 election, his opponent was Ameet Shubhashrao Zhanak. In the 2024 election, Deshmukh contested against Ameet Shubhashrao Zhanak and Bhavana Gawali, among others. Zhanak won the election.

In the 2024 Maharashtra Legislative Assembly election, Deshmukh contested from the Risod Assembly constituency. He was defeated by Ameet Shubhashrao Zhanak. After the formation of Washim district, Deshmukh remained active in the politics of the district and was associated with local bodies including the Zilla Parishad, Risod Municipal Council, and Malegaon Nagar Panchayat. Deshmukh joined the Bharatiya Janata Party on 14 March 2023 along with his sons Nakul Anantrao Deshmukh and Chaitanya Anantrao Deshmukh. Reports stated that he joined the BJP after dissatisfaction with the Indian National Congress leadership. Deshmukh was a classmate of Rajesh Pilot and Madhavrao Scindia.
