= Akola West Assembly constituency =

Constituency of the Maharashtra legislative assembly in India

Coordinates: 20°56′55.01″N 77°6′5.73″E

Akola West
- Constituency No. 30 for the Maharashtra Legislative Assembly

Constituency details
- Country: India
- Region: Western India
- State: Maharashtra
- District: Akola
- Lok Sabha constituency: Akola
- Established: 2008
- Total electors: 351,092
- Reservation: None

Member of Legislative Assembly
- 15th Maharashtra Legislative Assembly
- Incumbent Sajid Khan Pathan
- Party: INC
- Alliance: MVA
- Elected year: 2024

Akola West Assembly constituency is one of the 288 Vidhan Sabha (Legislative Assembly) constituencies of Maharashtra state in western India. This constituency is located in the Akola district.

Akola is part of the Akola Lok Sabha constituency along with five other Vidhan Sabha segments, namely Akot, Akola East, Balapur and Murtizapur in this district and Risod in adjoining Washim district.

As per orders of Delimitation of Parliamentary and Assembly constituencies Order, 2008, No. 30 Akola West Assembly constituency is composed of the following: Akola Tehsil (Part) - Akola (M.Corp.) (Part), Ward No 1 to 7,13 to 30, 38 to 53 and 56 to 65 of the district.

On 3 November 2023, Akola West Assembly Constituency got Vacant as the death of Senior BJP Leader Govardhan Mangilal Sharma

== Members of the Legislative Assembly ==
Year	Member	Party
Before 2008: Constituency did not exist
2009	Govardhan Sharma	Bharatiya Janata Party
2014	Govardhan Sharma	Bharatiya Janata Party
2019	Govardhan Sharma	Bharatiya Janata Party
2024	Sajid Khan Pathan	Indian National Congress

== Election results ==
=== Assembly Election 2024 ===
2024 Maharashtra Legislative Assembly election : Akola West
Party	Candidate	Votes	%	±%
INC	Sajid Khan Pathan	88,718	43.48%	▲1.12
BJP	Vijay Kamalkishor Agrawal	87,435	42.85%	▼1.06
Independent	Harish Ratanlal Alimchandani	21,481	10.53%	New
Independent	Rajesh Kripashankar Mishra	2,653	1.30%	New
PHJSP	Ashok Madhukar Olambe	2,127	1.04%	New
NOTA	None of the Above	1,257	0.62%	▼0.95
Margin of victory		1,283	0.63%	▼0.93
Turnout		205,317	58.48%	▲7.90
Total valid votes		204,060		
Registered electors		351,092		▲5.68
INC gain from BJP		Swing	▼0.44	

=== Assembly Election 2019 ===
2019 Maharashtra Legislative Assembly election : Akola West
Party	Candidate	Votes	%	±%
BJP	Govardhan Mangilal Sharma	73,262	43.91%	▼3.20
INC	Sajid Khan Pathan	70,669	42.36%	▲35.91
VBA	Madan Bhargad	20,687	12.40%	New
NOTA	None of the Above	2,617	1.57%	New
Margin of victory		2,593	1.55%	▼26.57
Turnout		169,540	51.03%	▼1.18
Total valid votes		166,839		
Registered electors		332,220		▲20.18
BJP hold		Swing	▼3.20	

=== Assembly Election 2014 ===
2014 Maharashtra Legislative Assembly election : Akola West
Party	Candidate	Votes	%	±%
BJP	Govardhan Mangilal Sharma	66,934	47.11%	▲11.92
NCP	Vijay Pundlikrao Deshmukh	26,981	18.99%	New
BBM	Aasif Khan Mustafa Khan	23,927	16.84%	▲7.35
SS	Gulabrao Ramrao Gawande	10,572	7.44%	New
INC	Usha Jagajitsingh Virak	9,164	6.45%	▼19.25
WPOI	Mahemood Usman Sk. Anwar	1,457	1.03%	New
NOTA	None of the Above	1,047	0.74%	New
BSP	Sanghpal Kashiram Sirsat	1,032	0.73%	New
Margin of victory		39,953	28.12%	▲18.63
Turnout		143,163	51.79%	▲2.56
Total valid votes		142,076		
Registered electors		276,433		▲7.59
BJP hold		Swing	▲11.92	

=== Assembly Election 2009 ===
2009 Maharashtra Legislative Assembly election : Akola West
Party	Candidate	Votes	%	±%
BJP	Govardhan Mangilal Sharma	44,156	35.19%	New
INC	Ramakant Umashankar Khetan	32,246	25.70%	New
JSS	Azhar Husain	23,060	18.38%	New
BBM	Haji Sajjad Husen Altaf Husen	11,909	9.49%	New
MNS	Pankaj Dnyanesh Sable	5,660	4.51%	New
SP	Nakirkha Ahemadkha	2,753	2.19%	New
AIUDF	Abdul Munaf Abdul Rasheed	1,578	1.26%	New
Margin of victory		11,910	9.49%	
Turnout		125,547	48.87%	
Total valid votes		125,483		
Registered electors		256,923		
BJP win (new seat)				

== See also ==
- Akola
- List of constituencies of Maharashtra Vidhan Sabha
