= Baliram Sirskar =

Indian politician

Member of Maharashtra Legislative Assembly
- In office (2009-2014), (2014 – 2019)
- Preceded by: Narayanrao Gavhankar
- Succeeded by: Nitin Deshmukh (Tale)
- Constituency: Balapur

Personal details
- Party: Shivsena
- Other political affiliations: BBM, VBA, NCP, BJP

Baliram Bhagwan Sirskar is a member of the 13th Maharashtra Legislative Assembly. He represents the Balapur Assembly Constituency. He belongs to the BJP.
