= Madhusudan Vairale =

Indian politician (1928–1988)

Member of Parliament, Lok Sabha
- In office (1980–1984), (1984 – 1989)
- Preceded by: Vasant Sathe
- Succeeded by: Pandurang Pundalik Fundkar
- Constituency: Akola, Maharashtra

Member of Maharashtra Legislative Assembly
- In office (1967–1972)
- Preceded by: Shriram Mankar
- Succeeded by: Govindrao Sarnaik
- Constituency: Balapur

Personal details
- Born: 11 November 1928 Akola, Bombay Presidency, British India
- Died: 16 April 1988 (aged 59)
- Party: Indian National Congress
- Spouse: Vijaya Vairale

Madhusudan Atmaram Vairale (11 November 1928 – 16 April 1988) was an Indian politician. He was elected to the Lok Sabha, the lower house of the Parliament of India as a member of the Indian National Congress.

Vairale died on 16 April 1988, at the age of 59.
