= Randhir Pralhadrao Sawarkar =

Indian politician

Member of the Maharashtra Legislative Assembly
- In office 2014–Incumbent
- Preceded by: Haridas Bhade
- Constituency: Akola East
- Majority: 45,996 (2024)

Chief Whip of Maharashtra BJP Legislative Party
- In office February 2024 – Incumbent
- Chief Minister: Devendra Fadnavis

General Secretary of Bharatiya Janata Party, Maharashtra
- In office September 2022 – Incumbent
- President: Chandrashekhar Bawankule

Personal details
- Born: 14 April 1973 (age 53) Akola, Maharashtra, India
- Party: Bharatiya Janata Party
- Spouse: Manjusha Randhir Sawarkar
- Children: Sayali Randhir Sawarkar; Harsh Randhir Sawarkar
- Education: Sant Gadge Baba Amravati University
- Occupation: Politician, Businessman, Agriculturist

Randhir Pralhadrao Sawarkar (born 14 April 1973) is an Indian politician from the Bharatiya Janata Party (BJP) who has represented the Akola East constituency in the Maharashtra Legislative Assembly since 2014. Since February 2024, he has served as the Chief Whip of the Maharashtra BJP Legislative Party under Chief Minister Devendra Fadnavis. Additionally, he has held the position of General Secretary of the Maharashtra BJP since September 2022, during the tenure of party president Chandrashekhar Bawankule. Sawarkar’s political career has been marked by his focus on regional development and agricultural issues, particularly in the Akola district.

== Early life and education ==
Randhir Pralhadrao Sawarkar was born on 14 April 1973 in Akola, Maharashtra. He completed his early education at Holy Cross Convent School in Akola before pursuing a Bachelor of Engineering (B.E.) degree in Production at the College of Engineering and Technology, Akola, affiliated with Sant Gadge Baba Amravati University, graduating in 1995. His entry into politics came at the age of 17, when he became involved in student movements linked to the Shetkari Sanghatana, an organization focused on farmers' rights, eventually rising to the role of district president.

== Political career ==
Randhirbhau is a member of the Rashtriya Swayamsevak Sangh (RSS), a far-right Hindu nationalist paramilitary volunteer organisation. Sawarkar’s political journey began with grassroots activism, and he joined the BJP, where he steadily advanced through various roles. He first won the Akola East seat in the 2014 Maharashtra Legislative Assembly election, defeating Haridas Bhade of the Bharipa Bahujan Mahasangh by a margin of 2,440 votes. He retained the constituency in the 2019 and 2024 elections, with his 2024 victory marked by a significant margin of 50,613 votes against Ashish Ramrao Datkar of Shiv Sena (UBT).

Within the BJP, Sawarkar has held several positions, including General Secretary (Rural) of Akola District BJP from 2007 to 2010 and District President (Rural) from 2020 to 2023. His appointment as General Secretary of the Maharashtra BJP in September 2022 and Chief Whip in February 2024 reflect his growing influence within the party’s state unit.

Sawarkar has been active in legislative proceedings, with a reported attendance rate of 89% between November 2019 and March 2024, surpassing the state average of 83.5%, and raising 218 questions during that period.

== Personal life ==
Sawarkar is married to Manjusha Randhir Sawarkar, who holds a postgraduate degree. The couple has two children Sayali Randhir Sawarkar, and their son, Harsh Randhir Sawarkar.
