= Washim Lok Sabha constituency =

Former constituency of the Indian parliament in Maharashtra

Coordinates: 20.1°N 77.1°E

washim
- Former Lok Sabha constituency

Constituency details
- Country: India
- Region: Western India
- State: Maharashtra
- Established: 1952
- Abolished: 2008

Washim was a Lok Sabha constituency in Maharashtra state in western India from 1977 (6th Lok Sabha) till 2004 elections (14th Lok Sabha). It was established before the 1977 Lok Sabha elections following the abolition of the Khamgaon Lok Sabha constituency, which had existed for three terms in the eighbouring Buldhana district. This constituency was dissolved when the delimitation of parliamentary constituencies based on the recommendations of the Delimitation Commission of India constituted in 2002 was implemented with the creation of new Yavatmal-Washim Lok Sabha constituency.

== Members of Parliament ==
Year	Member	Party
1952-76 : See Khamgaon Lok Sabha constituency
1977	Vasantrao Naik †	Indian National Congress
1980	Ghulam Nabi Azad	Indian National Congress (I)
1984	Ghulam Nabi Azad	Indian National Congress
1989	Anantrao Vithhalrao Deshmukh	Indian National Congress
1991	Anantrao Vithhalrao Deshmukh	Indian National Congress
1996	Pundlikrao Gawali	Shiv Sena
1998	Sudhakarrao Naik	Indian National Congress
1999	Bhavana Gawali Patil	Shiv Sena
2004	Bhavana Gawali Patil	Shiv Sena
2008 onwards : See Yavatmal–Washim Lok Sabha constituency

== Detailed Results ==
Vote share of Winning candidates
2004	49.77%
1999	38.29%
1998	57.23%
1996	39.30%
1991	38.66%
1989	55.34%
1984	42.28%
1980	64.42%
1977	60.01%

=== 2004 ===
2004 Indian general election: Washim
Party	Candidate	Votes	%	±%
SS	Bhavana Gawali	358,682	49.77	
NCP	Naik Manohar Rajusing	297,784	41.32	
BSP	Dr. Jadhav Ravi Sampatrao	21,943	3.04	
IND	S. Wahiddoddin S. Karimoddin	14,085	1.95	
LRP (Note: Lok Rajya Party)	Jagirdar Shamshoddin Ainnoddin	6,842	0.95	
IND	Kamble Shilanand Laxmanrao	5,226	0.73	
IND	Pathak Mohan Dattatraya	3,827	0.53	
SP	Shekh Mukim Ahamad Abdul Rashid	3,515	0.49	
IND	Beniwale Salim Gangubhai	2,668	0.37	
ARP (Note: Ambedkarist Republican Party)	Yashwant Sukhdev Patil	2,436	0.34	
IND	Kamble Uttam Bhagaji	1,963	0.27	
IND	Debaje Abuji alias Pralhadrao Ashruji	1,752	0.24	
Majority		60,898	8.45	
Turnout		720,723		
SS hold		Swing		

=== 1999 ===
1999 Indian general election: Washim
Party	Candidate	Votes	%	±%
SS	Bhawana Pundlikrao Gawali	244,820	38.29	
INC	Deshmukh Anantrao Vitthalrao	205,225	32.10	
NCP	Prof. Javed Khan	154,030	24.09	
IND	Naik Raju Ramu	24,859	3.89	
IND	Kalapad Ramkrishna Sakharamji	6,810	1.07	
IND	Debaje Lekhak Pralhadrao Ashruji	3,671	0.57	
Majority		39,595	6.19	
Turnout		678,010	67.52	
Swing to SS from INC		Swing		

=== 1998 ===
1998 Indian general election: Washim
Party	Candidate	Votes	%	±%
INC	Naik Sudhakarrao Rajusing	359,742	57.23	
SS	Dr. Dnyaneshwar Keshaorao Shewale	251,152	39.96	
JD	Dhole Nagorao Punjarao	7,810	1.24	
IND	Debaje Pralhadrao Ashruji	3,215	0.51	
BSP	Jadhav Ravi Sampatrao	3,158	0.50	
IC(S)	Kakade Sarjerao Ganpatrao	1,547	0.25	
IND	Deshmukh Narayanrao Shankarrao	1,396	0.22	
IND	Annasaheb Deshmukh	552	0.09	
Majority		108,590	17.27	
Turnout		641,162	63.60	
Swing to INC from SS		Swing		

=== 1996 ===
1996 Indian general election: Washim
Party	Candidate	Votes	%	±%
SS	Gawali Pundlikrao Ramji	228,238	39.30	
INC	Naik Sudhakar Rajusingh	211,549	36.42	
BBM	Pawar Makharam Banduji	90,321	15.55	
AIIC(T)	Pande Sambhaji Dattarao	18,758	3.23	
JP	Kadam Nagorao Tukaram	2,616	0.45	
IC(S)	Sarjerao Ganpatrao Kakade	1,072	0.18	
IND	19 Independent Candidates	28,240	4.88	
Majority		16,689	2.88	
Turnout		592,491	61.04	
Swing to SS from INC		Swing		

=== 1991 ===
1991 Indian general election: Washim
Party	Candidate	Votes	%	±%
INC	Anantrao Vitthalrao Deshmukh	173,708	38.66	
BRP (Note: Bharatiya Republican Paksha)	Pawar Makhram Banduji	124,719	27.76	
SS	Naik Raju Ramu	116,160	25.85	
IND	Ingole Bhimrao Vithuji	9,375	2.09	
IND	Vijaykumar Shriram Deshmukh	5,026	1.12	
INS(SCS)	Dawale Baburao Deorao	3,215	0.72	
BSP	Sonone Ramprabhu Suryabhanji	1,492	0.33	
DDP	Sarkate Goutam Prabhakar	159	0.04	
IND	15 Independent Candidates	15,454	3.44	
Majority		48,989	10.90	
Turnout		456,483	53.16	
INC hold		Swing		

=== 1989 ===
1989 Indian general election: Washim
Party	Candidate	Votes	%	±%
INC	Deshmukh Anantrao Vitthalrao	306,935	55.34	
IND	Yedatkar Laxmanrao Hanguji	171,081	30.84	
BRP	Abdul Rauf Sk. Mohiyoddin	37,643	6.79	
DMM (Note: All India Dalit Muslim Minorities Suraksha Mahasangh)	Atote Gopalrao Sukhdeorao	12,700	2.29	
IND	Gulmohammad Khan Wayyub Khan	8,369	1.51	
DDP	Bhole Ashok Motiram	6,366	1.15	
SS	Gawande Gulabrao Ramrao	6,171	1.11	
BSP	Sonone Ramprabha Suryabhanji	3,166	0.57	
IND	Jadhao Babusing Madansing	1,198	0.22	
IND	Dabaje Pralhadrao Ashruji	1,020	0.18	
Majority		135,854	24.50	
Turnout		568,338	66.58	
INC hold		Swing		

=== 1984 ===
1984 Indian general election: Washim
Party	Candidate	Votes	%	±%
INC	Ghulam Nabi Azad	197,822	42.28	
IC(S)	Rathod Gokuldas Dekhsing	187,463	40.07	
IND	Chandan Raghobaji Telang	69,370	14.83	
IND	Patil Manoharrao Nagorao	6,218	1.33	
IND	C. K. Mankikar	2,402	0.51	
LKD	Kadam Nagarao Tukaram	2,034	0.43	
IND	Mahadeo Tukaramji Khadse	1,950	0.42	
IND	Vikram Kisan Pradhan	628	0.13	
Majority		10,359	2.21	
Turnout		481,264	70.10	
INC hold		Swing		

=== 1980 ===
1980 Indian general election: Washim
Party	Candidate	Votes	%	±%
INC(I)	Ghulam Nabi Azad	245,091	64.42	
JP	Ade Pratapsing Ramsing	93,613	24.61	
RPI	Sirsat Sahebrao Kisarao	10,210	2.68	
IND	Ramchandra Vishweshwar Joshi	7,729	2.03	
IND	Joshi Ratnakar Prabhakar	6,995	1.84	
IND	Deshmukh Dattarao Marotrao	6,614	1.74	
IND	Polkat Purushottam Wasudeo	3,611	0.95	
IND	Reddi P. Ramchandra Narayan	3,204	0.84	
IND	Kadam Nagorao Tukaram	1,981	0.52	
IND	Paikrao Tulshiram Yogaji	1,396	0.37	
Majority		151,478	39.81	
Turnout		392,774	63.27	
Swing to INC(I) from INC		Swing		

=== 1977 ===
1977 Indian general election: Washim
Party	Candidate	Votes	%	±%
INC	Vasantrao Naik	213,339	60.01	
RPI(K)	Khandare Shankarrao Sambhuji	140,182	39.43	
IND	Kodgirwar Ramdas Dattatraya	1,978	0.56	
Majority		73,157	20.58	
Turnout		367,227	68.28	
INC win (new seat)				

== See also ==
- Washim district
- List of constituencies of the Lok Sabha
