= K. M. Asghar Husain =

Indian politician

K.M. Asghar Husain

M P
- In office 1967–1971
- Preceded by: Mohammad Mohibbul Haq
- Succeeded by: Vasant Sathe
- Constituency: Akola

Vice-President, Municipal Council Akola
- In office 1955–1971

Personal details
- Born: 23 January 1916 Ghodegaon, Maharashtra
- Party: INC
- Spouse: Ruh-Afza Khanum
- Children: 2 sons, 3 daughters
- Education: Law college Nagpur
- Profession: Advocate; Educationist
- As of 22 February, 2012

Khan M. Asghar Husain (born 23 January 1916) was a member of the 4th and 5th Lok Sabha of India. He represents the Akola constituency of Maharashtra and a member of the Indian National Congress (INC) political party.

He was a Member, Nagpur University Court during 1967–70 and Governing Body of Shivaji College, Akola.

He was vice-president of Municipal Council, Akola since 1955;

He was president, Berar Muslim Educational Conference since 1969 and Urdu Education Society, Akola.
