= Anup Dhotre =

Indian politician

Anup Sanjay Dhotre

Member of Parliament, Lok Sabha
- Incumbent
- Assumed office 4 June 2024
- Preceded by: Sanjay Dhotre
- Constituency: Akola

Personal details
- Born: 24 May 1984 (age 42)
- Party: Bharatiya Janta Party
- Spouse: Sameeksha Anup Dhotre (wife)
- Parent: Sanjay Shamrao Dhotre (father)

Anup Sanjay Dhotre is an Indian politician and Member of Parliament in the 18th Lok Sabha. He is a member of Bharatiya Janta Party. He is the son of Sanjay Dhotre.

== Political career ==
Anupbhau Dhotre is a member of the Rashtriya Swayamsevak Sangh (RSS), a far-right Hindu nationalist paramilitary volunteer organisation. In 2024, Dhotre was elected Member of Parliament of the Akola Lok Sabha Constituency.
