= Govardhan Mangilal Sharma =

Indian politician (1949–2023)

Govardhan Sharma

Minister of state Government of Maharashtra
- In office June 1995 – 7 May 1998
- Chief Minister: Manohar Joshi
- Minister: Narayan Rane
- Department: Animal Husbandry, Dairy Development & Fisheries

Member of Maharashtra Legislative Assembly
- In office (2009-2014), (2014-2019), (2019 – 2023)
- Preceded by: constituency created
- Succeeded by: Sajid Khan Pathan
- Constituency: Akola West
- In office (1995-1999), (1999-2004), (2004 – 2009)
- Preceded by: Arun Vishnuji Divekar
- Succeeded by: constituency abolished
- Constituency: Akola

Personal details
- Born: 2 January 1949 Pusad, Yavatmal, Central Provinces and Berar, India
- Died: 3 November 2023 (aged 74) Akola, Maharashtra, India
- Party: Bharatiya Janata Party
- Spouse: Gangadevi Sharma
- Parent: Mangilal Sharma (father)
- Occupation: Politician

Govardhan Mangilal Sharma (2 January 1949 – 3 November 2023) was an Indian politician who was a member of the 13th Maharashtra Legislative Assembly. He represented the Akola-West Assembly Constituency. He belonged to the Bharatiya Janata Party.

Sharma was the senior leader of Bharatiya Janata Party in Akola district, and he had been continuously representing the Akola West constituency from 1995.

== Death ==
Govardhan Sharma died from cancer on 3 November 2023, at the age of 74.
