= Khamgaon Lok Sabha constituency =

Former constituency of the Indian parliament in Maharashtra

Coordinates: 20.7°N 76.6°E

Khamgaon
- Former Lok Sabha constituency

Constituency details
- Country: India
- Region: Western India
- State: Maharashtra
- Established: 1962
- Abolished: 1977
- Reservation: SC

Khamgaon Lok Sabha constituency was a Lok Sabha (Parliamentary) constituency of Maharashtra state in western India. This constituency was in existence during Lok Sabha elections of 1962, 1967 and 1971 for the 3rd to 5th Lok Sabha. It was abolished for 1977 Lok Sabha elections, with creation of new Washim (Lok Sabha constituency) in neighbouring Akola district. It was reserved for Scheduled Caste candidate. After 2008 delimitation, some areas including the former Khamgaon Lok Sabha cnstituency and its full assembly segment were included in the Buldhana (Lok Sabha constituency).

== Members of Parliament ==
| Year | Member | Party |
|---|---|---|
1952-61 : Constituency does not exist
| 1962 | Laxman Shrawan Bhatkar | Indian National Congress |
| 1967 | Arjun Shripat Kasture | Indian National Congress |
| 1971 | Arjun Shripat Kasture | Indian National Congress |
1976 onwards : See Washim Lok Sabha constituency

== See also ==
- Buldhana (Lok Sabha constituency)
- Akola (Lok Sabha constituency)
- Washim (Lok Sabha constituency)
- List of former constituencies of the Lok Sabha
- Buldhana district
- Akola district
