= Balapur Assembly constituency =

Constituency of the Maharashtra legislative assembly in India

Coordinates: 20°39′58.31″N 76°46′15.71″E

Balapur
- Constituency No. 29 for the Maharashtra Legislative Assembly

Constituency details
- Country: India
- Region: Western India
- State: Maharashtra
- District: Akola
- Lok Sabha constituency: Akola
- Established: 1951
- Total electors: 311,167
- Reservation: None

Member of Legislative Assembly
- 15th Maharashtra Legislative Assembly
- Incumbent Nitin Deshmukh
- Party: SS(UBT)
- Alliance: MVA
- Elected year: 2024

Balapur Assembly constituency is one of the 288 constituencies of Maharashtra State Assembly and one of the five which are located in Akola district.

It is a part of the Akola (Lok Sabha constituency) along with five other assembly constituencies, viz Akot, Akola West and Akola East, Murtizapur (SC) and Risod from the Washim district.

As per orders of Delimitation of Parliamentary and Assembly constituencies Order, 2008, No. 29 Balapur Assembly constituency is composed of the following: 1. Balapur Tehsil, 2. Patur Tehsil, 3. Akola Tehsil (Part) Revenue Circle - Ugawa of the Akola district.

== Members of the Legislative Assembly ==
Year	Member	Party
1952	Dagadu Palaspagar & Kazi Syed Ghiyasuddin Kazi Syed Nasiruddin	Indian National Congress
1952	Ghiyasuddin Kazi	Indian National Congress
1957	Ghiyasuddin Kazi	Indian National Congress
1962	Shriram Mankar	Independent
1967	Madhusudan Vairale	Indian National Congress
1972	Govindrao Sarnaik	Indian National Congress
1978	Prakashchandra Gujarathi	Indian National Congress (I)
1980	Pralhadrao Khode	Indian National Congress (I)
1981	Laxmanrao Tayade	Indian National Congress (I)
1985	Govardhan Khotre	Indian National Congress
1990	Kisanrao Raut	Bharatiya Janata Party
1995	Narayanrao Gavhankar	Bharatiya Janata Party
1999	Laxmanrao Tayade	Indian National Congress
2004	Narayanrao Gavhankar	Bharatiya Janata Party
2009	Baliram Sirskar	Independent
2014	Baliram Sirskar	Bharipa Bahujan Mahasangh
2019	Nitin Bhikanrao Deshmukh (Tale)	Shiv Sena
2024	Nitin Bhikanrao Deshmukh (Tale)	Shiv Sena (UBT)

== Election results ==
=== Assembly Election 2024 ===
2024 Maharashtra Legislative Assembly election : Balapur
Party	Candidate	Votes	%	±%
SS(UBT)	Nitin Bhikanrao Deshmukh (Tale)	82,088	37.14	New
VBA	Syed Natiquddin Khatib (S.N. Khatib)	70,349	31.83	▲5.73
SS	Baliram Bhagwan Sirskar	61,192	27.68	▼8.12
NOTA	None of the above	589	0.27	▼0.64
Margin of victory		11,739	5.31	▼4.39
Turnout		221,631	71.23	▲5.11
Total valid votes		221,042		
Registered electors		311,167		▲5.16
SS(UBT) gain from SS		Swing	▲1.34	

=== Assembly Election 2019 ===
2019 Maharashtra Legislative Assembly election : Balapur
Party	Candidate	Votes	%	±%
SS	Nitin Bhikanrao Deshmukh (Tale)	69,343	35.80	▲31.79
VBA	Dr. Dhairyavardhan Haribhau Pundkar	50,555	26.10	New
AIMIM	Dr. Rahman Khan Haji Kale Khan	44,507	22.98	New
NCP	Sangram Gulabrao Gawande	16,497	8.52	▲3.80
SWP	Dudhe Tukaram Ukarda	6,262	3.23	New
NOTA	None of the above	1,753	0.91	▲0.37
Margin of victory		18,788	9.70	▲5.56
Turnout		195,636	66.12	▲5.84
Total valid votes		193,690		
Registered electors		295,885		▲5.64
SS gain from BBM		Swing	▲11.11	

=== Assembly Election 2014 ===
2014 Maharashtra Legislative Assembly election : Balapur
Party	Candidate	Votes	%	±%
BBM	Baliram Bhagwan Sirskar	41,426	24.69	New
INC	Syed Natiquddin Khatib (S.N. Khatib)	34,487	20.56	▼6.16
BJP	Thorat Tejrao Uttamrao	30,741	18.32	▼3.13
Independent	Sandip Dadarao Patil	18,547	11.06	New
Independent	Narayanrao Haribhau Gavhankar	16,230	9.67	New
NCP	Hidayat Khan Rum Khan	7,919	4.72	New
SS	Kalin Wamanrao Lande	6,722	4.01	New
Independent	Mukim Ahmad	2,901	1.73	New
NOTA	None of the above	901	0.54	New
Margin of victory		6,939	4.14	▲3.02
Turnout		168,841	60.28	▲2.89
Total valid votes		167,765		
Registered electors		280,085		▲12.97
BBM gain from Independent		Swing	▼3.15	

=== Assembly Election 2009 ===
2009 Maharashtra Legislative Assembly election : Balapur
Party	Candidate	Votes	%	±%
Independent	Baliram Bhagwan Sirskar	39,581	27.84	New
INC	Rajaya Begum Natiquoddin Khatib	37,991	26.72	▲9.28
BJP	Gavhankar Narayanrao Haribhau	30,491	21.45	▼19.26
JSS	Nitin Bhikanrao Deshmukh (Tale)	25,022	17.60	New
MNS	Prashant Kashiram Lothe	1,714	1.21	New
Independent	Mohammedsadiq Mohammed ismaile	1,334	0.94	New
Independent	Mohammedibrahim Ab. Subhan	1,141	0.80	New
BSP	Devanand Jyotiram Gawai	1,136	0.80	▼1.04
Margin of victory		1,590	1.12	▼4.55
Turnout		142,288	57.39	▼7.68
Total valid votes		142,159		
Registered electors		247,924		▲25.88
Independent gain from BJP		Swing	▼12.87	

=== Assembly Election 2004 ===
2004 Maharashtra Legislative Assembly election : Balapur
Party	Candidate	Votes	%	±%
BJP	Gavhankar Narayanrao Haribhau	52,157	40.71	▲11.87
BBM	Sy. Mohsin Bhai	44,889	35.04	New
INC	Syed Natiquddin Khatib (S.N. Khatib)	22,340	17.44	▼22.05
Independent	Prakash Shriram Mankar	2,907	2.27	New
BSP	Atul Damodar Amankar	2,355	1.84	New
Independent	Dr. D. S. Thorat	1,921	1.50	New
Independent	Madhukar Onkar Tarhale	1,547	1.21	New
Margin of victory		7,268	5.67	▼4.98
Turnout		128,162	65.07	▲3.15
Total valid votes		128,116		
Registered electors		196,952		▲11.45
BJP gain from INC		Swing	▲1.22	

=== Assembly Election 1999 ===
1999 Maharashtra Legislative Assembly election : Balapur
Party	Candidate	Votes	%	±%
INC	Tayade Laxmanrao Babuji	40,228	39.49	▲18.94
BJP	Gavhankar Narayanrao Haribhau	29,376	28.84	▼0.56
Independent	Tathod Sevakram Mahadeo	16,161	15.86	New
SP	Mukim Ahmad Abdul Rasheed	14,716	14.45	New
Independent	Nikhade Prakash Rajaram	690	0.68	New
Margin of victory		10,852	10.65	▲9.64
Turnout		109,425	61.92	▼15.50
Total valid votes		101,873		
Registered electors		176,716		▲7.24
INC gain from BJP		Swing	▲10.09	

=== Assembly Election 1995 ===
1995 Maharashtra Legislative Assembly election : Balapur
Party	Candidate	Votes	%	±%
BJP	Gavhankar Narayanrao Haribhau	36,844	29.40	▼11.48
BBM	Dhomane Suryabhan Narayan	35,582	28.39	New
INC	Syed Natiquddin Khatib (S.N. Khatib)	25,757	20.55	▲5.45
Independent	Subhankha Haji Kalekha	10,241	8.17	New
Independent	Tathod Prakashrao Shankarrao	6,445	5.14	New
Independent	Baldeorao Shridhar Mahaisane	4,385	3.50	New
JD	Satav Pandurang Sakharam	2,110	1.68	▲0.29
Independent	Kanta Ramrao Mhaisane	1,080	0.86	New
Margin of victory		1,262	1.01	▼5.58
Turnout		127,571	77.42	▲11.21
Total valid votes		125,325		
Registered electors		164,779		▲12.35
BJP hold		Swing	▼11.48	

=== Assembly Election 1990 ===
1990 Maharashtra Legislative Assembly election : Balapur
Party	Candidate	Votes	%	±%
BJP	Kisanrao Babanrao Raut	39,183	40.88	▲14.81
AIML	Gazi Mohammadali Qaz Mohammed Ibrahimali	32,870	34.29	New
INC	Tirukh Devidas Namdeo	14,471	15.10	▼24.15
Independent	Raut Kanardhan Pundlik	5,121	5.34	New
JD	Govindrao Amutrrao Mankar	1,330	1.39	New
Margin of victory		6,313	6.59	▼0.13
Turnout		97,108	66.21	▲2.99
Total valid votes		95,858		
Registered electors		146,661		▲21.86
BJP gain from INC		Swing	▲1.63	

=== Assembly Election 1985 ===
1985 Maharashtra Legislative Assembly election : Balapur
Party	Candidate	Votes	%	±%
INC	Khotre Gowardhan Janadan	29,207	39.25	New
Independent	Abdullaha Khan Manzer Manwerkhan	24,206	32.53	New
BJP	Deshmukh Vasantrao Bapurao	19,395	26.07	▼10.14
Independent	Ghatol Shivlal Sukhadeo	697	0.94	New
Margin of victory		5,001	6.72	▼6.73
Turnout		76,090	63.22	
Total valid votes		74,405		
Registered electors		120,354		
INC gain from INC(I)		Swing	▼10.41	

=== Assembly By-election 1981 ===
1981 Maharashtra Legislative Assembly by-election : Balapur
Party	Candidate	Votes	%	±%
INC(I)	Tayade Laxmanrao Babuji	34,515	49.66	▲14.66
BJP	Deshmukh Vasantrao Bapurao	25,165	36.21	▲18.72
Independent	K. V. Vithalrao	7,314	10.52	New
Independent	C. K. Mankkar	1,339	1.93	New
Independent	P. S. Dharmaji	480	0.69	New
Margin of victory		9,350	13.45	▼1.05
Total valid votes		69,500		
INC(I) hold		Swing	▲14.66	

=== Assembly Election 1980 ===
1980 Maharashtra Legislative Assembly election : Balapur
Party	Candidate	Votes	%	±%
INC(I)	Khode Pralhadrao Narayanrao	20,039	35.00	▲3.21
RPI(K)	Khandare Shankar Rao Sambhuji	11,739	20.50	New
BJP	Akbar Vakil Sheikh Abdar	10,012	17.49	New
INC(U)	Dr. Tirukh Devidas Namdeo	9,758	17.04	New
Independent	Gadgil Chandrashekar Shambhurao	3,008	5.25	New
Independent	Nawakar Namdeorao Ganpat	1,135	1.98	New
Independent	Gujrathi Prakashchandra Nathulal	911	1.59	New
Independent	Kanjarkar Prakash Bhaskarrao	412	0.72	New
Margin of victory		8,300	14.50	▲8.79
Turnout		59,082	54.03	▼16.78
Total valid votes		57,255		
Registered electors		109,349		▲6.05
INC(I) hold		Swing	▲3.21	

=== Assembly Election 1978 ===
1978 Maharashtra Legislative Assembly election : Balapur
Party	Candidate	Votes	%	±%
INC(I)	Gujarathi Prakashchandra Alias Banduseth Nattulal	22,469	31.79	New
JP	Akbar Vakil Sheikh Abdar	18,434	26.08	New
INC	Madhusudan Vairale	12,523	17.72	▼52.03
PWPI	Karale Devidas Marotirao	11,311	16.00	New
Independent	Ingale Namdeo Sharwan	1,353	1.91	New
Independent	Ingle Bhagwantrao Ramrao	1,332	1.88	New
Independent	Anandrao Awadhut Mankar	1,107	1.57	New
Independent	Motiram Kisan Gadage	881	1.25	New
Margin of victory		4,035	5.71	▼45.37
Turnout		73,014	70.81	▲7.02
Total valid votes		70,673		
Registered electors		103,114		▲9.95
INC(I) gain from INC		Swing	▼37.96	

=== Assembly Election 1972 ===
1972 Maharashtra Legislative Assembly election : Balapur
Party	Candidate	Votes	%	±%
INC	Govindrao S. Sarnayak	36,832	69.75	▲16.10
Independent	Anandrao S. Bhuskute	9,859	18.67	New
RPI	Vishwanath Kwankhade	6,118	11.59	▼16.25
Margin of victory		26,973	51.08	▲25.27
Turnout		59,828	63.79	▼5.62
Total valid votes		52,809		
Registered electors		93,782		▲11.67
INC hold		Swing	▲16.10	

=== Assembly Election 1967 ===
1967 Maharashtra Legislative Assembly election : Balapur
Party	Candidate	Votes	%	±%
INC	Madhusudan Vairale	28,690	53.65	▲11.42
RPI	S. H. Mankar	14,888	27.84	New
Independent	B. A. Ingle	8,557	16.00	New
Independent	B. K. Tayde	1,339	2.50	New
Margin of victory		13,802	25.81	▲13.69
Turnout		58,291	69.41	▲0.23
Total valid votes		53,474		
Registered electors		83,979		▲13.80
INC gain from Independent		Swing	▼0.70	

=== Assembly Election 1962 ===
1962 Maharashtra Legislative Assembly election : Balapur
Party	Candidate	Votes	%	±%
Independent	Shriram Haribhau Mankar	25,173	54.35	New
INC	Kazi Syed Gayasuddin Syed Nasiruddin	19,561	42.23	▼16.81
Independent	Sampat Jamuji Wankhede	1,583	3.42	New
Margin of victory		5,612	12.12	▼11.11
Turnout		51,055	69.18	▲1.73
Total valid votes		46,317		
Registered electors		73,795		▲16.58
Independent gain from INC		Swing	▼4.69	

=== Assembly Election 1957 ===
1957 Bombay State Legislative Assembly election : Balapur
Party	Candidate	Votes	%	±%
INC	Kazi Syed Ghiyasuddin Kazi Syed Nasiruddin	25,208	59.04	▼0.37
PWPI	Mankar Anandrao Awadhut	15,291	35.81	New
Independent	Kahate Wasantrao Dajipant	2,196	5.14	New
Margin of victory		9,917	23.23	▲22.61
Turnout		42,695	67.45	▼23.78
Total valid votes		42,695		
Registered electors		63,301		▼33.20
INC hold		Swing	▲29.03	

=== Assembly Election 1952 ===
1952 Hyderabad State Legislative Assembly election : Balapur
Party	Candidate	Votes	%	±%
INC	Kazi Syed Ghiyasuddin Kazi Syed Nasiruddin	25,944	30.01	New
INC	Dagdu Zangoji Palaspagar	25,411	29.40	New
Socialist	Ramkrishna Shrawan Rathod	6,449	7.46	New
Independent	Wamanrao Namdeorao Mankar	5,823	6.74	New
SKP	Bajirao Ganpatrao Mahalle	5,451	6.31	New
Independent	Ulkuda Govind Patil	4,840	5.60	New
ABJS	Wasantrao Dajipant Kahate	3,985	4.61	New
Independent	Shankar Sadu Pan Patil	3,249	3.76	New
RRP	Namdeo Tanaji Khandare	3,078	3.56	New
Independent	Kisan Govind Ingale	2,214	2.56	New
Margin of victory		533	0.62	
Turnout		86,444	91.23	
Total valid votes		86,444		
Registered electors		94,758		
INC win (new seat)				

== See also ==
- Balapur taluqa
- Patur taluqa
