= Vasant Sathe =

Indian politician (1925–2011)

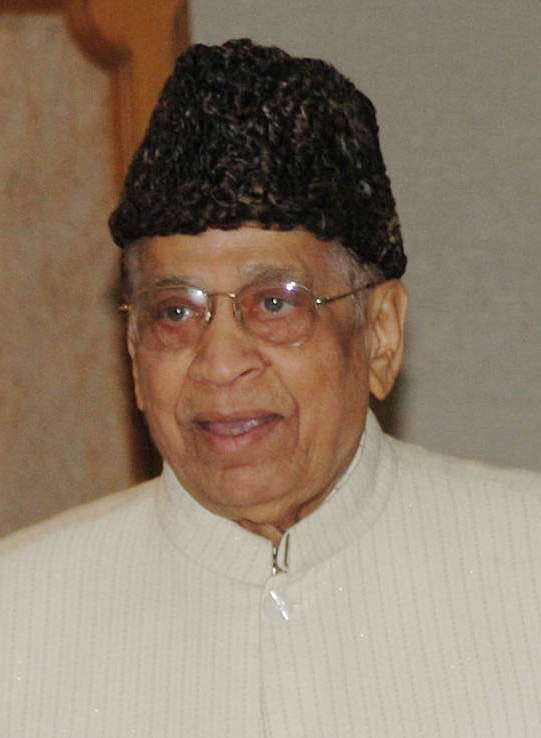

Union Minister of Information and Broadcasting
- In office 1980–1982
- Prime Minister: Indira Gandhi
- Preceded by: Purushottam Kaushik
- Succeeded by: N. K. P. Salve

Member of Parliament, Lok Sabha
- In office 21 January 1980 – 21 June 1991
- Preceded by: Santoshrao Gode
- Succeeded by: Ramchandra Ghangare
- Constituency: Wardha (Lok Sabha constituency)
- In office 1971–1980
- Preceded by: K. M. Asghar Husain
- Succeeded by: Madhusudan Vairale
- Constituency: Akola (Lok Sabha constituency)

Personal details
- Born: 5 March 1925 Nashik, Bombay Presidency, British India
- Died: 23 September 2011 (aged 86) Gurgaon, Haryana, India
- Party: Indian National Congress
- Spouse: Jayashree Sathe
- Children: 3
- Website: www.vasantsathe.com

Vasant Purushottam Sathe (5 March 1925 – 23 September 2011) was an Indian politician of the Indian National Congress party. He was a lawyer by training and became a parliamentarian in 1972 and a cabinet minister during the 1980s. He was a socialist and came to prominence in the congress after Indira Gandhi split the party for a second time in 1978. He was also known for his tenure as Union Minister of Information and Broadcasting when he initiated the process which led to Indian television moving into colour broadcasting for the Asian Games 1982 and Hum Log the first colour Indian soap-opera.

== Early life ==
Vasant Purushottam Sathe was born on 5 March 1925 at Nashik, Maharashtra, to Purushottam Sathe.

He received his early education at Bhonsla Military School, Nashik, and did his master's in economics and political science at Nagpur Mahavidyalaya, followed by a degree in law at Morris College, Nagpur University.

== Political career ==
Sathe joined the Socialist Party upon at its inception in 1948 after which he joined the Congress. He made his debut as a Member of Parliament in 1972 for the Akola constituency in the Vidarbha region of Maharashtra. In the 1980s he moved to the Wardha constituency. He won from Wardha in 1980, 1984 and 1989, but lost in 1991 and 1996. Sathe worked as a Union Cabinet minister for the Government of India. He is known for his candidness on issues of critical concern to the country and his unconventional lifestyle. He propagated the Presidential form of government for India.

He was a member of the Consultative Committee of the Planning commission in 1972 before holding key portfolios as the Union Minister of Ministry of Information and Broadcasting in 1980, Chemicals and Fertilizers in 1982, Steel, Mines & Coal in 1985, Energy in 1986, and Communications from 1988–1989.

He was also the Chairman of Indo-Japan Study Committee from 1992–95 and became President of the Indian Council for Cultural Relations in 1993. He has represented India at UNESCO, the World Peace Congress and the Inter-Parliamentary Union.

In 2005 he released his auto-biography Memoirs of a Rationalist on his 81st birthday.

== Personal life ==
Sathe married the late Jayshree Sathe on 7 February 1949. He has 3 children: Two daughters Suhas and Suniti and a son, Subhash who is an industrialist at Gurgaon near Delhi.

He died following a heart attack on 23 September 2011 in Gurugram, India. He complained of chest pain late in the evening and was rushed to a private hospital, where doctors declared him dead.

== Books ==
- Towards Social Revolution: A Case for Economic Democracy, Vikas Pub., 1985. ISBN 0-7069-2580-7.
- Restructuring of Public Sector in India, Vikas Pub. House, 1989.
- National government: agenda for a new India, UBS Publishers Distributors, 1991. ISBN 81-85273-66-9.
- Two Swords in One Scabbard: a Case for Presidential Form of Parliamentary Democracy, NIB Publishers, 1989.
- Tax Without Tears: For Economic Independence and National Integration,
- The Challenge of Change: Key Issues for a Developing Society, Allied Publishers, 1989.
- India to be a Global Power.
- Memoirs of a Rationalist, Om Books International, 2005. ISBN 81-87107-40-5.
