= Palso =

Village in Maharashtra

Coordinates: 20°46′N 77°14′E

Palso Palaso BK
- Village
- Interactive map of Palso
- Country: India
- State: Maharashtra
- District: Akola

Government
  - Type: Grampanchayat
  - Body: Grampanchayat of Palso

Population (2011)
  - Total: 1,456
- Demonym: Palsokar

Languages
  - Official: Marathi

Palso is a village in Akola district in the state of Maharashtra, India.

== Location ==
Palso is a village 21 kilometres (13 mi) from Akola City. Palso is one of the smaller villages in Akola district with a population of 1456 as of the 2011 census.
