= Pundlikrao Gawali =

Indian politician

Pundlikrao Ramji Gawali

Member of Parliament in Lok Sabha
- In office 1996–1998
- Preceded by: Anantrao Vithhalrao Deshmukh
- Succeeded by: Sudhakarrao Naik
- Constituency: Washim Lok Sabha constituency

Personal details
- Born: Pundlikrao Ramji Gawali; 11 November 1949 Gohgaon, Akola District , Maharashtra)
- Died: 13 September 2001 (aged 51) Washim, Maharashtra
- Party: Shiv Sena
- Children: Bhavana Pundlikrao Gawali

Pundlikrao Ramji Gawali (born 11 November 1949 in Gohgaon, Akola, Maharashtra) was an Indian politician and member of the Shiv Sena. He was Member of Parliament representing Washim from 1996 to 1998 in the 11th Lok Sabha.
