= Amit Subhashrao Zanak =

Indian politician

Amit Zanak

Member of the Maharashtra Legislative Assembly
- Incumbent
- Assumed office 19 October 2014
- Preceded by: Subhash Zanak
- Constituency: Risod

Personal details
- Born: Mangul Zanak / gaundhala
- Party: Indian National Congress
- Spouse: Priti Khedekar
- Parent: Subhash Zanak (father)
- Education: B.Tech. in Electronics Engineering; MBA
- Alma mater: Priyadarshini College of Engineering, Nagpur
- Occupation: Politician, Farmer

Amit Subhashrao Zanak is a member of Maharashtra Legislative Assembly. He represents the constituency of Risod, India. He belonged to the Indian National Congress (INC).

He was all set to embark on the engineering profession until his father's sudden death on 28 October 2014 that forced him to take a plunge into the world of politics at the age of 28. But he performed exceedingly well after winning the by-polls on a Congress ticket from Risod constituency in Washim district. The seat was left vacant after his father Subhash Zanak, former minister state minister for women and child development, died due to a cardiac arrest. Zanak is from the third generation Zanak family dynasty of politicians.

He claimed to provide the many facilities in his constituency including construction of substation and many small irrigation projects, piding potable water to villagers, starting a training centre for UPSC and MPSC examinations and also a gymnasium for the youths.

On 22 March 2017, Zanak was suspended along with 18 other MLAs until 31 December for interrupting Maharashtra Finance Minister Sudhir Mungantiwar during a state budget session and burning copies of the budget outside the assembly four days earlier.

== Vidhan Sabha Elections, 2014 ==
In the Maharashtra Vidhan Sabha Elections which were held on 15 October 2014, Ameet Zanak contested from Risod constituency on an Indian National Congress Party ticket. Ashok Chavan was reportedly very keen to offer Ameet Zanak the Congress candidate from Risod. Ameet Zanak defeated Mr. Vijay Jadhav of BJP, the Ex-MLA of same constituency. Ameet Zanak got 391 votes in this election whereas his challenger Mr. Vijay Jadhav had to be satisfied with 61,285.
