= Kurankhed =

Village in Maharashtra

- village
- Location in Maharashtra, India Kurankhed (India)
- Coordinates: 20°42′7″N 77°14′59″E
- Country: India
- State: Maharashtra
- District: Akola
- Elevation: 294 m (965 ft)

Languages
  - Official: Marathi
- Time zone: UTC+5:30 (IST)
- Vehicle registration: MH-30

Kurankhed is a village in the Akola district in Amravati division of Vidarbha region of Maharashtra state in India.

It is situated on the bank of the river Katepurna, one of the north-flowing rivers in the Akola district, and it is also recognized as the village Katepurna. It is well known among the pilgrimage for the shri Chandika Devi locally known as Dhaga Devi, the temple situated in the village boundary of the village Dhaga. The annual fair organised in the month of April every year. The many historic evidence was noticed in the mythological books, the historic name of Kurankhed was mentioned as Kuntinpur.

It is located on National Highway 6 running between Hazira (near Surat) in Gujarat to Kolkata, West Bengal.
