= Ujaleshwar =

Village in Maharashtra

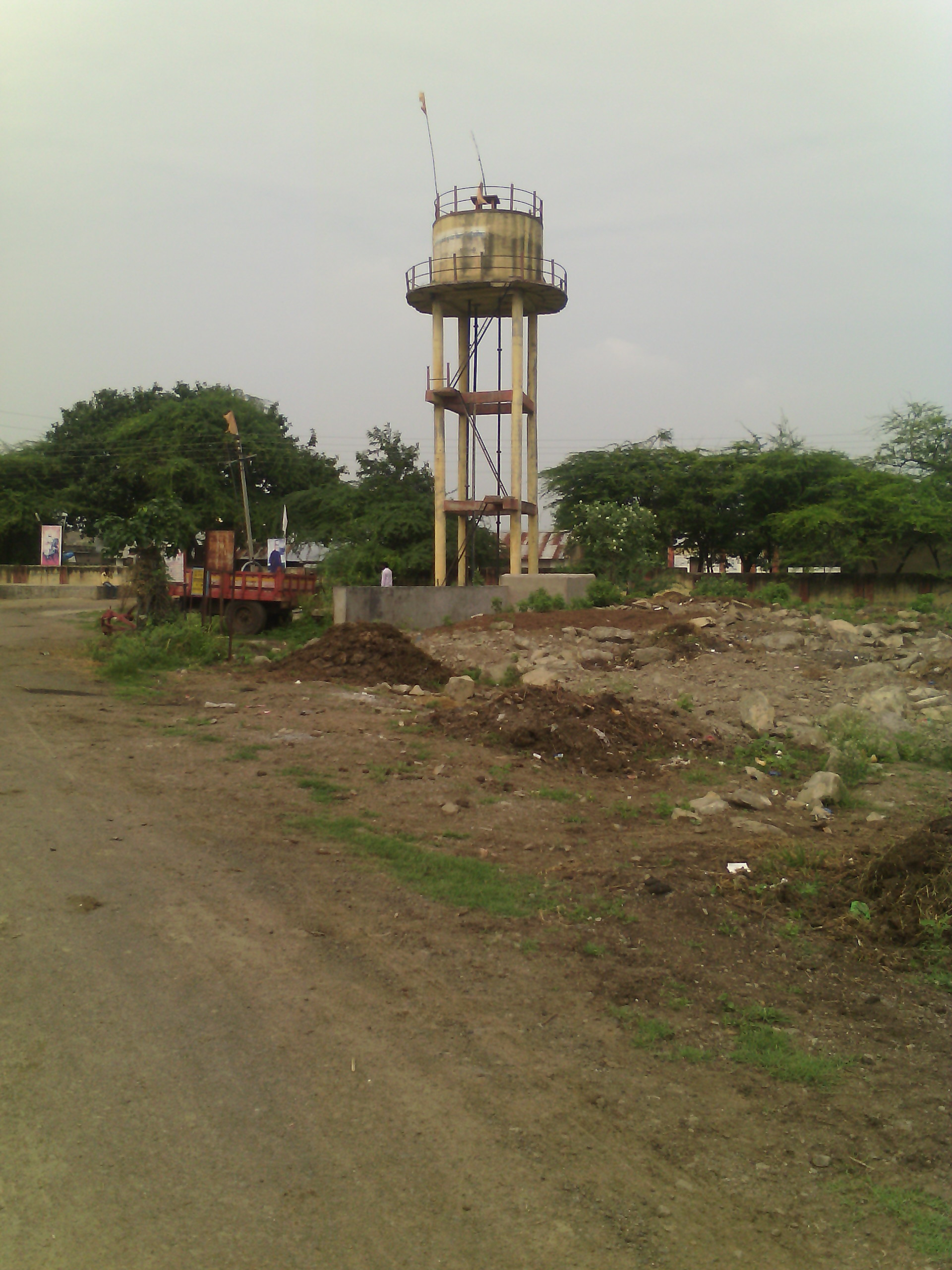
Ujaleshwar water tank

Ujaleshwar is a small village in the Akola district of Maharashtra State, India.

Ujaleshwar is located in the Barshitakli Tehsil administrative division. Its neighboring villages include Kajaleshwar and Nimbhara. Ujaleshwar's nearest rail station is in Barshitakli, and its nearest airport is Akola Airport.

== Etymology ==
Ujaleshwar (in Marathi (उजळेश्वर, Ujaḷēśvar) is named after the God Ujaleshwar, also known as Shiva. Ujale (उजळे) is defined as enlightened, and Shwar (ईश्वर) translates to God. सर्वांचे कल्याण करणारा देव म्हणजे उजळेश्वर.

== History ==
Records show that Ujaleshwar existed at the time of the Maratha Empire in the 18th century. Numerous coins from the Shivaji Maharaj have been found from excavations around the village. For a sizable amount of the village's history, its inhabitants were poor and lacked opportunities to earn wages. The villagers worked on farms in nearby villages such as Tamsi and Nimbhara, since Ujaleshwar inhabitants could not support their own agriculture due to a lack of water. The Government of Maharashtra later built numerous dams in the area, enabling irrigation and farming. The village has since grown economically, providing employment opportunities for local residents.

== Population ==

In 2011, a national census concluded that the population of Ujaleshwar was 851 with 184 families. This included 96 children 0-6 years old, 10.53% of the population. The sex ratio is 884, which is below the average sex ratio of Maharashtra State. The literacy rate is 86.52%, higher than the state's average of 82.34%.

== Religion ==
Religions practiced in the village include Hinduism, Buddhism, and Brahmanism.

== Festivals ==
Festivals are an important part of village life, and the people of Ujaleshwar celebrate many, including Navratri, Ganeshotsav, and Shivjayanti. During Navaratri Utsav, the inhabitants of Ujaleshwar perform the Garba dance. The event is particularly popular among younger men and women.

== Nearby villages ==
- Tamsi
- Tiwasa
- Donad
- Kajaleshwar
- Titawan
- Nimbhara
- Mahan
- Kothali
- Redava
