= Sanjay Shamrao Dhotre =

Indian politician

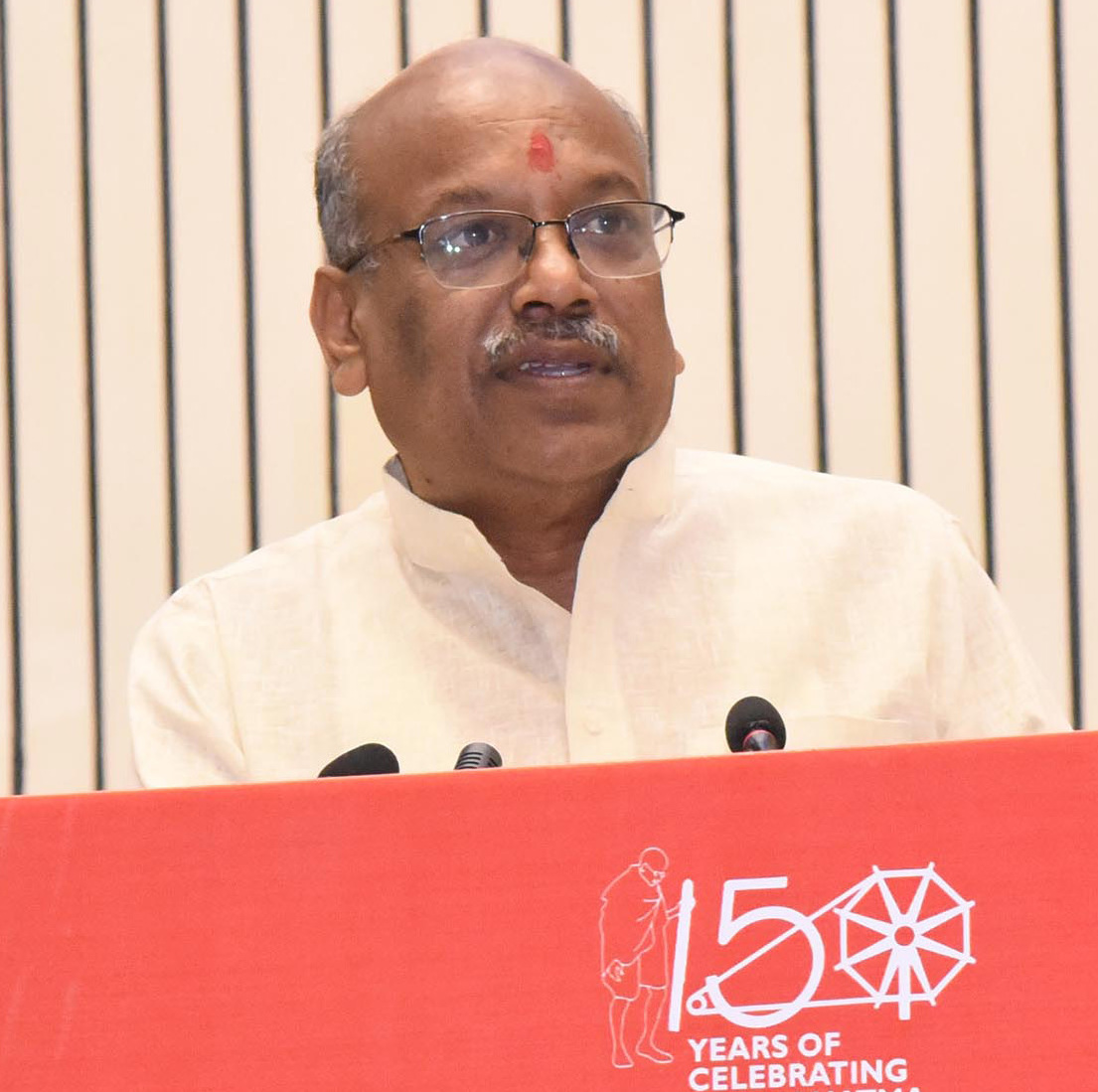

Minister of State for Human Resource Development (from 29 July 2020 as Education)
- In office 30 May 2019 – 7 July 2021
- Prime Minister: Narendra Modi
- Minister: Ramesh Pokhriyal
- Preceded by: Satya Pal Singh
- Succeeded by: Dr. Subhas Sarkar and Annpurna Devi

Minister of State for Electronics and Information Technology
- In office 30 May 2019 – 7 July 2021
- Prime Minister: Narendra Modi
- Minister: Ravi Shankar Prasad
- Preceded by: S.S. Ahluwalia
- Succeeded by: Rajeev Chandrasekhar

Minister of State for Communications
- In office 30 May 2019 – 7 July 2021
- Prime Minister: Narendra Modi
- Minister: Ravi Shankar Prasad
- Preceded by: Manoj Sinha

Member of Parliament, Lok Sabha
- In office 13 May 2004 – 4 June 2024
- Preceded by: Prakash Ambedkar
- Succeeded by: Anup Sanjay Dhotre
- Constituency: Akola, Maharashtra

Member of the Legislative Assembly, Maharashtra
- In office 6 October 1999 – 14 May 2004
- Preceded by: Bhausaheb Lahane
- Succeeded by: Tukaram Bidkar
- Constituency: Murtizapur

Personal details
- Born: 26 February 1959 (age 67) Akola, Bombay State, India
- Party: Bharatiya Janata Party
- Spouse: Suhasini Dhotre
- Children: 2 sons including Anup Dhotre
- Education: Government College of Engineering, Amravati
- Profession: Industrialist; Agriculturist
- As of 1 June, 2019

Sanjay Shamrao Dhotre (born 26 February 1959) is an Indian politician from the state of Maharashtra and formerly Minister of State in the Government of India and a former member of the 17th Lok Sabha of India. He represents the Akola constituency of Maharashtra and is a member of the Bharatiya Janata Party (BJP) political party.

He was also a member of the 14th Lok Sabha, 15th Lok Sabha and 16th Lok Sabha between 2004 and 2019 from Akola.

== Education and early career ==
Dhotre holds a Bachelor of Mechanical Engineering from the Government College of Engineering, Amravati. He graduated in 1981.

== Career ==
In May 2019, Dhotre became Minister of State for Human Resource Development, Communications and Electronics and Information Technology.

=== Debate details in Lok Sabha ===
- 14-Jul-2014 (I) The Budget (Railways) – 2014-15 (II) Demands for Excess Grants (Railways) – 2011-12
- 14-Jul-2014 - Need to expedite the gauge conversion of the Ratlam-Fatehabad-Indore-Mhow-Khandwa-Amalakhurd-Akot-Akola Section
- 31-Jul-2014 - flood and drought situation in the country
- 11-Aug-2014 - The Railways (Amendment) Bill, 2024
- 25-Nov-2014 - Demand for recognizing Anganwadi workers as regular govt employees
- 11-Mar-2015 - The Budget (Railways) – 2015–16; (ii) Demands Grants on Account (Railways) – 2015–16; and (iii) Supplementary Demands for Grants (Railways) – 2014-15
- 19-Mar-2015 - Discussion on the agrarian situation in the country
- 22-Apr-2015 - Regarding not to scrap Handloom Reservation Act
- Resignation from Modi Cabinet on Wednesday 7 July 2021

=== Positions held in Lok Sabha ===
- 5 Aug. 2004 and 5 Aug. 2007 - Aug. 2008 - Member, Committee on Information Technology
- 31 Aug. 2009 - Member, Committee on Rural Development
- 14 Aug. 2014 onwards - Member, Committee on Estimates
- 1 Sep. 2014 onwards - Member, Standing Committee on Railways
- 1 Sep. 2014 onwards - Member, Consultative Committee, Ministry of Agriculture
- 3 July 2015 onwards - Convenor, Sub Committee-III, Committee on Estimates

=== Legislative ===
- Member, Maharashtra Legislative Assembly - 1999 to 2004
- Elected for 14th Lok Sabha (First Term)
- Re-elected for 15th Lok Sabha (Second Term)15th Lok Sabha
- Re-elected for 16th Lok Sabha (Third Term)
- Re-elected for 17th Lok Sabha (Fourth Term)

== Family and personal life ==
Sanjay Dhotre was married to Suhasini in 1983. They have two sons. His eldest son Anup Dhotre is Member of Lok Sabha from Akola.
