= Nitin Tale =

Indian politician

Nitin Bappu Deshmukh

Member of the Maharashtra Legislative Assembly
- Incumbent
- Assumed office (2019-2024), (2024-Present)
- Preceded by: Baliram Sirskar
- Constituency: Balapur

Personal details
- Born: Nitin Bhikanrao Tale At.Sasti Tq.Patur, Akola District
- Party: Shiv Sena(UBT)

Nitin Bhikanrao Deshmukh (Tale) is an Indian politician serving as MLA in Maharashtra Legislative Assembly from Balapur Vidhan Sabha constituency. He is District President of Shiv Sena from Akola district, Maharashtra.

== Positions held ==
- 2019: Elected to Maharashtra Legislative Assembly
- 2024: re-elected to Maharashtra Legislative Assembly.
