= Harish Pimple =

Indian politician

Member of the Maharashtra Legislative Assembly for Murtizapur
- Incumbent
- Assumed office 2009
- Preceded by: Tukaram Bidkar

Personal details
- Born: 20 January 1964 (age 62) Kalyan, Maharashtra, India
- Party: Bharatiya Janata Party
- Spouse: Nutan Pimple
- Children: Rohan Pimple (Son); Gouri Pimple
- Parent: Marotiappa Pimple (father)
- Occupation: Politician

Harish Marotiappa Pimple is a member of the 13th Maharashtra Legislative Assembly. He represents the Murtizapur Assembly Constituency. He belongs to the Bharatiya Janata Party.

== Political career ==
Harish Pimple is a member of the Rashtriya Swayamsevak Sangh (RSS), a far-right Hindu nationalist paramilitary volunteer organisation.
