= Sajid Khan Pathan =

Indian politician (born 1975)

Member of the Maharashtra Legislative Assembly
- Incumbent
- Assumed office 23 November 2024
- Preceded by: Govardhan Mangilal Sharma

State Chairman of the Minority Department, Maharashtra Pradesh Congress Committee
- Constituency: Akola West
- Incumbent
- Assumed office August 2026

Personal details
- Born: Akola, State of Maharashtra
- Party: INC
- Spouse: Anjum Khan Sajid Khan
- Children: Sohel Khan Sajid Khan, Uzma Khan Sajid Khan
- Occupation: Politician

Sajid Khan Mannan Khan (also Sajid Khan Pathan) (born 1975) is an Indian politician from Maharashtra. He is a member of the Maharashtra Legislative Assembly from Akola West Assembly constituency in Akola district. He won the 2024 Maharashtra Legislative Assembly election, representing the Indian National Congress.

== Early life and education ==
Pathan was born in Akola, Maharashtra in a middle class family. He is the son of Mannan Khan Sujat Khan. He passed Class 8 at Mungilal Bajoriya School and later discontinued his studies in 1991 after failing to clear Class 10 examinations conducted by Akola Board, Amravati.

== Career ==
Pathan entered politics in 2007 and was elected as a municipal corporator from a local ward in Akola which he served for three consecutive terms and about 20 years. He also served as chairman of the Standing Committee and leader of the opposition in Akola Municipal Corporation.

Pathan won from Akola West Assembly constituency representing Indian National Congress in the 2024 Maharashtra Legislative Assembly election. He polled 88,718 votes and defeated his nearest rival, Vijay Agrawal Kamalkishor of the Bharatiya Janata Party, by a margin of 1,283 votes. During the post victory celebrations, a few of his supporters were arrested for allegedly assaulting policemen. Earlier, he lost the 2019 Maharashtra Legislative Assembly election.

In August 2026, Pathan was appointed chairman of the Minority Department of the Maharashtra Pradesh Congress Committee. The appointment was approved by Congress president Mallikarjun Kharge.
