= Khairlanjichya Mathyawar =

- Directed by: Raju Meshram
- Produced by: Padmashree Kalpana Saroj
- Starring: Kishori Shahane Vij; Anant Jog; Milind Shinde
- Music by: Anand Modak
- Release date: 7 February 2014
- Country: India
- Language: Marathi

Khairlanjichya Mathyawar is a 2014 Indian Marathi language film directed by Raju Meshram and produced by Padmashree Kalpana Saroj. The film stars Kishori Shahane Vij, Anant Jog and Milind Shinde, and features music by Anand Modak. It was released on 7 February 2014.

== Synopsis ==
The film is based on the Khairlanji massacre that took place in a village in Vidarbha in 2006. It focuses on the wife and children of Dalit farmer Bhayyalal Bhotmange, who were brutally murdered.

== Cast ==
- Kishori Shahane Vij as Surekha
- Dipak Balraj Vij
- Anant Jog
- Tukaram Bidkar
- Milind Shinde
- Vilas Ujawane
- Pratiksha Mungekar
- Dr. Sandeep Patil
- Akash Gharat
- Geeta Shinde

== Soundtrack ==
Khairlanjichya Mathyawar

Soundtrack album by Anand Modak
- Released: 2014
- Recorded: 2014
- Genre: Feature film soundtrack
- Language: Marathi

Track listing
No.	Title	Singer(s)	Length
1.	"Jhale Yudh Suru Aata"	Pranjali Barve	4:57
2.	"Rakht Hi Okun Jhale"	Ajay Gogavale	4:22
3.	"Saar Kas Saamsum"	Sangita Nerurkar	5:40
4.	"Anand Janu Bai"	Kumud Kulkarni, Meghana Kulkarni	2:18
5.	"Marnacha Paya"	Ravindra Sathe	4:42
6.	"Angani Bor Pikale"	Prachi Dubale	4:05
7.	"Mahadeva Jato Ga"	Kumud Kulkarni, Meghana Kulkarni, Pramod Ranade	3:16
8.	"Kashasathi Kashasathi"	Kalyani Shelke	4:26
9.	"Antar Mantar"	Jyoti Subhashchandra	0:57
Total length:			33:23

== Critical response ==
Khairlanjichya Mathyawar received mixed reviews from critics. A reviewer in The Indian Express wrote "While, the story and screenplay is taut and does not slack, Meshram’s attempt to string the various incidents together in a fortright manner, gives one the feel of watching a documentary". A reviewer in Divya Marathi wrote "Although the story is strong, the cinematography lacks grandeur due to poor editing".

== Controversy ==
A petition seeking to ban the film's release was filed by Bhayyalal Bhotmange himself and Ravi Shende, convener of Akhil Bharatiya Dhammasena. The petition claimed that his personality was wrongly presented in the film, and that some scenes tarnished the reputation of his daughter. As a result, a court cancelled the certificate given by the Censor Board and banned the film. The Nagpur Bench of the Bombay High Court upheld the ban.
