= 1982 elections in India =

Elections in India
- 1982

Elections in the Republic of India in 1982 included elections to five state legislative assemblies and to seats in the Rajya Sabha.

== Results ==
Date(s)	State	Government before election	Chief Minister before election	Government after election	Chief Minister after election	Maps
19 May 1982	Kerala	President's Rule		Indian National Congress	K. Karunakaran	
19 May 1982	Haryana	Indian National Congress	Bhajan Lal Bishnoi	Indian National Congress	Bhajan Lal Bishnoi	
19 May 1982	Himachal Pradesh	Indian National Congress	Thakur Ram Lal	Indian National Congress	Thakur Ram Lal	
19 May 1982	West Bengal	Communist Party of India (Marxist)	Jyoti Basu	Communist Party of India (Marxist)	Jyoti Basu	
10 November 1982	Nagaland	Naga National Democratic Party	John Bosco Jasokie	Indian National Congress	S. C. Jamir	

== Legislative Assembly elections ==
=== Haryana ===
Party	Votes	%	Seats
Indian National Congress (Indira)	1,845,297	37.58	36
Lok Dal	1,172,149	23.87	31
Bharatiya Janata Party	376,604	7.67	6
Janata Party	157,224	3.29	1
Communist Party of India	36,642	0.75	0
Communist Party of India (Marxist)	18,616	0.38	0
Indian National Congress (Socialist)	398	0.01	0
Independents	1,303,414	26.54	16
Invalid/blank votes	87,091	–	–
Total	4,997,435	100	90
Registered voters/turnout	7,152,281	69.87	–
Source: Electoral Commission of India

=== Himachal Pradesh ===
Party	Votes	%	Seats	+/–
Indian National Congress (Indira)	659,239	42.52	31	+22
Bharatiya Janata Party	545,037	35.16	29	New
Janata Party	73,683	4.75	2	–51
Communist Party of India	26,543	1.71	0	0
Lok Dal	22,521	1.45	0	New
Communist Party of India (Marxist)	2,636	0.17	0	0
Independents	220,637	14.23	6	0
Total	1,550,296	100.00	68	0
Valid votes	1,550,296	98.65		
Invalid/blank votes	21,278	1.35		
Total votes	1,571,574	100.00		
Registered voters/turnout	2,211,524	71.06		
Source: ECI

=== Kerala ===
Party Wise Results
Party	Seats	Valid Votes Secure	Alliance
Indian National Congress-Indira (Cong-I or INCI)	20	1137374	UDF
Congress (A) (INC(A))	15	920743	UDF
Indian Union Muslim League (IUML)	14	590255	UDF
Kerala Congress- Mani (KCM)	6	559930	UDF
Kerala Congress- Joseph (KCJ)	8	435200	UDF
Janata-Gopalan (JANG)	4	262595	UDF
National Democratic Party (NDP)	4	255580	UDF
Socialist Republican Party (SRP)	2	205250	UDF
Revolutionary Socialist Party-Sreekantan Nair (RSP-S)	1	114721	UDF
Praja Socialist Party (PSP)	1	29011	UDF
Democratic Labour Party (DLP)	1	35821	UDF
Independents (UDF)	1	71025	UDF
Communist Party of India-Marxist (CPI-M)	28	1964924	LDF
Communist Party of India (CPI)	13	838191	LDF
Congress-Socialist (ICS)	7	551132	LDF
Revolutionary Socialist Party (RSP)	4	263869	LDF
All Indian Muslim League (AIML)	4	310626	LDF
Janata (JAN)	4	386810	LDF
Democratic Socialist Party (DSP)	1	37705	LDF
Independents (LDF)	2	149928	LDF
Total	140		

=== Nagaland ===
Party	Votes	%	Seats	+/–
Indian National Congress	140,420	32.08	24	+9
Naga National Democratic Party	140,112	32.01	24	New
Independents	157,173	35.91	12	+3
Total	437,705	100.00	60	0
Valid votes	437,705	98.59		
Invalid/blank votes	6,267	1.41		
Total votes	443,972	100.00		
Registered voters/turnout	596,453	74.44		
Source: ECI

=== West Bengal ===
Party		Candidates	Seats	Votes	%
Left Front	Communist Party of India (Marxist)	209	174	8,655,371	38.49
Left Front	All India Forward Bloc	34	28	1,327,849	5.90
Left Front	Revolutionary Socialist Party	23	19	901,723	4.01
Left Front	Communist Party of India	12	7	407,660	1.81
Left Front	Revolutionary Communist Party of India	3	2	106,973	0.48
Left Front	Marxist Forward Bloc	2	2	80,307	0.36
Left Front	Biplobi Bangla Congress	1	0	34,185	0.15
Left Front	West Bengal Socialist Party and Democratic Socialist Party	10	6	354,935	1.58
Indian National Congress (I)		250	49	8,035,272	35.73
Indian Congress (Socialist)		28	4	885,535	3.94
Socialist Unity Centre of India		34	2	232,573	1.03
Janata Party		93	0	187,513	0.83
Bharatiya Janata Party		52	0	129,994	0.58
Indian Union Muslim League		4	0	129,116	0.57
Lok Dal		16	0	22,361	0.10
Jharkhand Mukti Morcha		1	0	1,268	0.01
Independents		432	1	994,701	4.42
Total		1,204	294	22,487,336	100
Source: ECI
