= Bhavana Gawali =

Indian politician

Bhavana Pundlikrao Gawali (Patil)

Member of Maharashtra Legislative Council
- Incumbent
- Assumed office 28 July 2024
- Governor: Ramesh Bais; C. P. Radhakrishnan
- Chairman of Council: Neelam Gorhe (Additional Charge); Ram Shinde
- Constituency: Elected by MLAs

Member of Parliament in Lok Sabha
- In office 2009–2024
- Succeeded by: Sanjay Uttamrao Deshmukh
- Constituency: Yavatmal–Washim

Member of Parliament in Lok Sabha
- In office 1999–2009
- Preceded by: Sudhakarrao Naik
- Constituency: Washim

Personal details
- Born: 23 May 1973 (age 53) Risod, Washim District, Maharashtra,
- Party: Shiv Sena
- Spouse: Capt. Prashant Surve Patil
- Parent: Pundlikrao Ramji Gawali (father)

Bhavana Pundlikrao Gawali (born 23 May 1974) is a five-time Member of Parliament from Shivsena representing Yavatmal-Washim Lok Sabha and she is a daughter of senior Shiv Sena leader & former M.P. Pundlikrao Gawali. She is serving as a Member of Parliament for this constituency since 1999. She is currently the most senior Member of Parliament from Maharashtra (more than 25 years in office).

The Enforcement Directorate (ED) raided several locations linked to Gawali on 30 August 2021.

== Early life and background ==
Bhavana Pundlikrao Gawali, also called Bhavnatai, was born in a traditional Ghatole Kunbi family in Risod on 23 May 1973. She is the daughter of former Shiv Sena senior leader & Member of parliament of Washim, Pundlikrao Ramji Gawali and Smt.Shalinitai Gawali. She completed her BA Arts from Risod, Washim (Babasaheb Dhabekar Arts College, Risod) from Amrawati University. She was married to Capt. Prashant Surve Patil.

== Positions held ==
Positions
Year	Position
1999	Elected to 13th Lok Sabha (1st term)
1999–2000	Member, Committee on Commerce
2000–2001	Member, Committee on Empowerment of Women
2004	Re-elected to 14th Lok Sabha (2nd term)
2007–09	Member, Committee on Health & Family Welfare
2009	Re-elected to 15th Lok Sabha (3rd term)
2009	Member, Committee on Transport, Tourism, and Culture
2014	Re-elected to 16th Lok Sabha (4th term)
Sep. 2014	Member, Standing Committee on Empowerment of Women, Human Resource Development and Ministry of Health and Family Welfare
2019	Re-elected to 17th Lok Sabha (5th term)
Sep. 2019	Member, Standing Committee on Health and Family Welfare, Health and Family Welfare
Oct. 2020	Member, Consultative Committee, Ministry of Women and Child Development, Absence of Members from the Sittings of the House
2024	Elected to Maharashtra Legislative Council (1st term)
