= Subhash Zanak =

Indian politician

Subhash Zanak was the MLA from Risod Constituency and Ex-Cabinet Minister of Women and Child Development in the Government of Maharashtra in India. He was leader from the Indian National Congress Party.

== Political career ==
He was elected as member of Maharashtra Legislative Assembly from Risod, in Washim district in October 2009. He was elected from Medshi (Vidhan Sabha constituency) in 1985, 1990 and 1995. He started his career by the guidance of his father Ramrao Zanak, who was elected as MLA from Medshi in 1980.

He died on 28 October 2013 at Akola in a private hospital from cardiac arrest.

Preceded by	Minister of Women and Child Administration; 7 November 2009 –	Succeeded by ??
