= Bharipa - Bahujan Mahasangh =

Political party of India

- Chairman: Prakash Ambedkar
- Founded: 4 July 1994
- Merged into: Vanchit Bahujan Aghadi (2019)
- Newspaper: Prabuddha Bharat
- Youth wing: Bharipa Bahujan Federation
- Ideology: Dalit Socialism; Secularism
- Political position: Centre-left
- Colours: Blue

Website
- www.bharip.org

The Bharipa - Bahujan Mahasangh (IAST: Bhāripa Bahujana Mahāsaṅgha; abbr. BBM) was an Indian political party founded by Prakash Ambedkar on 4 July 1994. The party was a splinter group of the Republican Party of India and had its roots in the Scheduled Castes Federation led by N. Sivaraj and B. R. Ambedkar. The president of the party was Prakash Ambedkar. The complete name of the party is Bharatiya Republican Paksha - Bahujan Mahasangh (Republican Party of India - Majority Grand Union). BBM was primarily based in Maharashtra. In 2019, BBM merged into the Vanchit Bahujan Aghadi, a new political party founded by Prakash Ambedkar.

== History ==
The party was formed on 4 July 1994, through a split in the Republican Party of India. The party was led by Prakash Ambedkar, the grandson of B. R. Ambedkar.

In the elections to the Maharashtra state assembly in 1999 BBM put up 34 candidates. In the 13th Lok Sabha elections during 1999, Ambedkar was elected from the Akola constituency.

In the 2004 Lok Sabha election, the party lost its parliamentary representation. In total the party had launched 16 candidates, all from Maharashtra. In Akola, Ambedkar was defeated by a Bharatiya Janata Party (BJP) candidate. BBM polled a total of 606,827 votes, and won three seats.

In the 2014 Maharashtra Legislative Assembly election BBM candidate Baliram Sirskar won from Balapur in Akola by a margin of 6,939 votes.

On 20 March 2018, Prakash Ambedkar founded new political party named the Vanchit Bahujan Aghadi. On 14 March 2019, Ambedkar has announced the Bharipa Bahujan Mahasangh will merge with the Vanchit Bahujan Aghadi. He said that, despite the 'Akola pattern' of social engineering through the success of the Bharipa-Bahujan Mahasangh, the word 'Bharipa' (RPI) had limited the expansion of the party. He said that after the Lok Sabha elections 2019, the Bharipa Bahujan Mahasangh will merge with the Vanchit Bahujan Aghadi, because the Vanchit Bahujan Aghadi is acceptable in a broad sense. On 8 November 2019, the Bharipa Bahujan Mahasangha merged into the Vanchit Bahujan Aghadi.

== Electoral performance ==
=== Lok Sabha Elections ===
Lok Sabha Term	Indian General Election	Seats contested	Seats won	Party Votes	Party Votes %	State (seats)
11th Lok Sabha	1996	4	0	3,29,695	1.2	Maharashtra (0)
13th Lok Sabha	1999	4	1	5,92,559	2.1	Maharashtra (1)
14th Lok Sabha	2004	16	0	4,28,566	1.3	Maharashtra (0)
15th Lok Sabha	2009	39	0	4,92,470	1.3	Maharashtra (0)
16th Lok Sabha	2014	23	0	3,60,854	0.7%	Maharashtra (0)

=== Maharashtra Vidhan Sabha Elections ===
Vidhan Sabha Term	Maharashtra General Election	Seats contested	Seats won	Party Votes	Party Votes %
10th Vidhan Sabha	1999	34	3	6,06,827	1.8
11th Vidhan Sabha	2004	83	1	5,16,221	1.2
12th Vidhan Sabha	2009	103	1	3,76,645	0.8
13th Vidhan Sabha	2014	70	1	4,72,925	0.9

== See also ==
- Republican Party of India (A)
- Republican Sena
