= Jarul =

Village in Maharashtra

- village
- Nickname: Marathwada
- Location in Maharashtra, India Jarul (India)
- Coordinates: 19.967°N 74.747°E
- Country: India
- State: Maharashtra
- District: Aurangabad
- Elevation: 514 m (1,686 ft)

Population (2001)
  - Total: 2,442

Languages
  - Official: Marathi
- Time zone: UTC+5:30 (IST)

Jarul is a small village and a Gram panchayat in Vaijapur taluka of the Aurangabad district in the Indian state of Maharashtra.

== Geography ==
Jarul is located at Latitude = 19°58'0"N and Longitude = 74°44'49"E 19.58°N 74.44°E. It has an average elevation of 514 metres (1686 feet) from the mean sea level at Karachi.

The nearest city is Vaijapur. Jarul is well connected to the city and railway station. The nearby railway station is Rotegaon station, on the South Central Railway system of Indian Railways.

It also has a small irrigation dam on the Sārangi river.

== Demographics ==
- Jarul has a total population of 2442, and 443 households. There are 1200 female and 1242 male residents.
- Overall literacy is 54.87% of the population (1340 people). The literacy rate for men is 67.63% (840 people), and 41.67% for women (500 people).

Many of the schools present in this village starting from Z.P to M.v . The most important things in this town are the greenery during the rainy season and its people.
