= Palaskheda =

Village in Maharashtra

Palaskheda is a village in Maharashtra, India. The village is located in Soegaon Tehsil of Aurangabad district.

== Address ==
Tal-Kaij Dist-Beed Maharashtra India PIN code-431518

=== Geographic Location ===
18°39'59.08"N Latitude

76°15'2.77"E Longitude

Elevation 2128 feet above MSL

== Population ==
Palaskheda had a total population of 231 according to the 2011 census. There were about 36 families in the village.
