= Patoda, Aurangabad =

Village in Maharashtra, India

Patoda
- Village
- Location in Maharashtra, India Patoda (India)
- Coordinates: 19.817203°N 75.268288°E
- Country: India
- State: Maharashtra
- Region: Marathwada
- District: Aurangabad
- Tahsil: Aurangabad

Government
  - Type: Gram Panchayat
  - Body: Patoda Gram Panchayat

Area
  - Total: 564.32 ha (1,394.5 acres)
  - Land: 488.99 ha (1,208.3 acres)
- Elevation: 561 m (1,841 ft)

Population (2011)
  - Total: 2,368
  - Density: 484.3/km^{2} (1,254/sq mi)
- Demonym: Patodawashi

Languages
  - Official: Marathi
  - Sex ratio: 927

Demographics
  - Literacy rate: 72.5%
- Time zone: UTC+5:30 (IST)
- PIN: 431001
- Area code: +91-2432
- Website: gskpatoda.in

Patoda (Marathi: पाटोदा) is known as the ideal village of Maharashtra and this village is located in Aurangabad taluka of Aurangabad district in the state of Maharashtra, India. 34 types of innovative activities are being implemented in this village and it has received a total of 24 awards from the central and state governments of India and others.

== Demographics ==
=== Population ===
The total population of Patoda is 3,368, of which 1,229 are males and 1,139 are females. Thus the average sex ratio of Patoda is 0.927.

The population of children of age 0–6 years is 348, which is 15% of the total population. There are 194 male children and 154 female children between the age 0–6 years. Thus, as per the census 2011, the child sex ratio of Patoda is 0.794 which is less than average sex ratio of Patoda village.

As per the census 2011, the literacy rate of Patoda is 72.5%. Thus, Patoda village has a higher literacy rate than the surrounding Aurangabad district (67.6%). The male literacy rate is 83.38% and the female literacy rate is 61.02%.

== Activities ==
Activities implemented in Patoda village

- Free flour mill

The said scheme was launched by Gram Panchayat in the year 2009–2010. So Gram Panchayat does not need to go home to ask for tax. Also every year there is an increase in account holders. Annual recovery is 90 to 95%. Gram panchayat has started 2 free flour mills for grinding grain in the village. Every Gram Panchayat tax paying family benefits from this initiative and free millet is provided to them throughout the year.

- Birthday

Every villager and student of the village is felicitated by the Gram Panchayat on the occasion of their birthday and entrusted with the responsibility of tree care by gifting a tree.

- CCTV Cameras

A total of 32 CCTV cameras have been installed at schools, offices and important places in the village through the Gram Panchayat. CCTV cameras keep control over the working class and help in village plastic ban, gutka ban, sewage management, garbage management and village security.

- Group Meal

On the 3rd Saturday of every month, a group meal is organized for all the citizens through public participation. An enlightening lecture is organized on this day and this activity is implemented throughout the year.

- Waste Management

Gram Panchayat has arranged 2 garbage bins in front of every house in the village to collect wet and dry waste. Garbage is collected and compost is made from the waste. Also, each house has been given an environmental bag to collect plastic and the said plastic is collected every Saturday And then the Gram Panchayat sells the plastic.

- Malnutrition Free Anganwadi

Children in the Anganwadi are given healthy food every day and the Anganwadi has played a significant role in eradicating malnutrition.

- ISO Rating

Day-to-day operations of Gram Panchayat Office and Anganwadi ISO. It is being done according to the operating system and I.S.O. Gram Panchayat and Anganwadi have received the rating certificate.

- Solar Lights and Biogas

15 solar lights have been installed at various places in the village and a total of 11 biogas projects have been implemented. Among them, 2 biogas projects have been connected to toilets.

- Banyan Trees and Women

On the occasion of Vat Purnima, women in the village are gifted with saplings of Vatvriksha from the Gram Panchayat and women are being given the benefit of self-help groups and various trainings. Every house in the village has a house number recorded by the Gram Panchayat and the name of the male and female head of the household is indicated on it.

- Village Festival

There are two temples of Shri Hanuman and Mahadev in the village and on the day of Dussehra all the people of the village gather together and organize religious, social and cultural events. Apart from this, many public welfare activities are being implemented by Gram Panchayat with the cooperation of villagers.
