= Deulgaon Bazar =

Village in Maharashtra

- village
- Interactive map of Deulgaon Bazar
- Coordinates: 20.3485°N 75.5002°E
- Country: India
- State: Maharashtra
- District: Aurangabad

Government
  - Body: Gram panchayat

Languages
  - Official: Marathi
- Time zone: UTC+5:30 (IST)
- PIN: 431113
- ISO 3166 code: IN-MH

Deulgaon Bazar is a village in Sillod taluka of Aurangabad district in the Indian state of Maharashtra.

The village is situated on the bank of the upper reaches of the Purna River, 27 km from Sillod. Due to the presence of various temples in the village, it was named Deulgaon (village of temples). The population is approximately 7000.

Deulgaon Bazar was famous for yielding Chili.
