= Vaijapur =

Vaijapur वैजापूर
- City
- Nickname: Gateway to Marathwada
- Location in Maharashtra, India
- Coordinates: 19.92°N 74.73°E
- Country: India
- State: Maharashtra
- District: Aurangabad
- Elevation: 514 m (1,686 ft)

Population (2011)
  - Total: 65,296

Languages
  - Official: Marathi
- Time zone: UTC+5:30 (IST)
- PIN: 423701
- Telephone code: 2436
- Vehicle registration: MH 57 (Earlier MH 20)
- Sex ratio: 924 ♂/♀

Vaijapur is a city and a municipal council in Aurangabad District in the Indian state of Maharashtra. It is bordered by the Nashik districts to the west, Kannad tehsil to the north, Gangapur tehsil to the east, and Ahmednagar districts to the south. Vaijapur is the headquarters of Vaijapur tehsil and also known as the Gateway of Marathwada.

== History ==
=== Battle of Palkhed ===
In 1719 Nizam-ul-Mulk who had been appointed the governor of Malva by the Mughal Emperor rose against the Sayyid Brothers and marched to the Deccan. He was followed by a large force under Dilawar ‘Ali Khan, and another army advanced against him from Aurangabad, commanded by the acting viceroy, ‘Alam ‘Ali Khan. Nizam-ul-Mulk first encountered the former, and Dilawar ‘Ali Khan was defeated and killed in engagement at Ratanpur, sixteen kos from Burhanpur. ‘Alam Ali Khan was at Fardapur when news arrived of Husain ‘Ali Khan, who was advancing to his assistance from Agra. He preferred, however, to hazard a battle, and was defeated and killed Burhanpur on 1 August 1720. Nizam-ul-Mulk proceeded to Aurangabad, where he was joined by Mubariz Khan, the subadar of Hyderabad, and other officers.22 Nizam-ul-mulk now established himself firmly in the Deccan. Next year saw the downfall of the Sayyad brothers and elevation of Nizam-ul-mulk as prime minister of the Mughal Empire. He took charge of his new post in 1722.1 But tired of court intrigues retired to the Deccan in 1724 when he crushed Mbariz Khan, the governor of Hyderabad in the battle of Sakharkherda which he later renamed Fatteh Kharda fought in October 1724.2 From this date the Nizam became virtually independent of Moghal power. In the next two years the Nizam consolidated his hold in the eastern parts of the province. His real enemies, however, were the Marathas who under the dynamic leadership of Peshva Bajirao were fast growing into an all-India power. In 1727 Nizam-ul-mulk opened his campaign against the Marathas. Bajirao, also made his preparations. He laid waste the district of Jalna in the cold season of 1727, and ‘Iwaz Khan with Asaf Jah's advanced guard partially engaged him. The Marathas retired to Mahur, and then turned rapidly towards Aurangabad and made for Burhanpur followed by ‘Iwaz Khan and ‘Asaf Jah. After crossing the Ajanta ghat, Bajirao started off for Gujarat; while ‘Asaf Jah relieved Burhanpur, and returned to Aurangabad with the intention of advancing on Pune. ‘Asaf Jah went as far as Ahmadnagar, when Bajirav also returned in 1728, and crossing the Kasar Bari ghat, laid waste the talukas of Vaijapur and Gangapur. ‘Asaf Jah's Maratha allies rendered him but little assistance, and he was much harassed by the enemy. There was also great scarcity of water. The Maratha forces surrounded him at Palkhed where a battle was fought in March 1728 and forced him to sign a treaty by which the Nizam agreed to acknowledge Shahu as the head of the Marathas, and as entitled to collect chauth and sardeshmuki in the Deccan. This treaty is a landmark in the history of the Nizams as the Marathas now obtained a full right to post their officers for the collection of chauth and sardeshmukhi in the territory of the Nizam.

== Geography ==
Vaijapur is located at 19.92°N 74.73°E. Vaijapur, situated on the Narangi river. Vaijapur is located 514 m (1,666 ft) above sea level on the western margin of the Deccan plateau.

== Toponymy ==
Regarding the origin of Vaijapur which was also known as Baizapur, it is related that a certain Kunbi struck upon a linga while ploughing his field. He installed this linga in a temple to Vaijanath and hence the village came to be known as Vaijapur. Yet another story tells that a certain princess Vaija was converted by a Muhammedan saint and that after her death she was laid to rest in the tomb of that saint. To commemorate this event the village was termed as Vaijapur or Baizapur. The town gives glimpses of its former prosperity in the handsome stone buildings which were erected by the savakars or capitalists of the place. The basement of the structures and the lower half of the walls are constructed of huge stone slabs, cemented and bolted together. Large kiln-burn bricks have been employed in building the upper portions of the walls, and the roofs are terraced. The town had a population of 16,660 in 1971. It also has a medium-size project on Nārangi-Sārangi river junction, for water supply to the Vaijapur city.

=== Municipality ===
Vaijapur was constituted a municipality in 1944 and according to the 1961 census its jurisdiction extended over an area of 13.6 square miles. The municipal affairs are managed by a committee of 21 members presided over by the president who is elected by the members from among themselves. Necessary administrative staff has been appointed to look after the various municipal departments. In 1973–74 municipal income and expenditure amounted to Rs. 8,04,000 and Rs. 6,81,000 respectively.

== Climate ==
The climate of the district is characterized by a hot summer and a general dryness throughout the year except during the southwest monsoon season, which is from June to September while October and November constitute the post-monsoon season. The winter season commences towards the end of November when temperatures begin to fall rapidly. December is the coldest month with the mean maximum temperature of 28.9 °C, while the mean minimum temperature is 10.3 °C. From the beginning of March, the daily temperature increases continuously. May is the hottest month with the mean maximum temperature of 39.8 °C and the mean minimum temperature of 24.6 °C. With the onset of the southwest monsoon by about the second week of June, the temperature falls appreciably. Except during the southwest monsoon season, when the relative humidity is high, the air is generally dry over the district. The summer months are the driest when the relative humidity is generally between 20 and 25% in the afternoon. Winds are generally light to moderate with increase in speed during the latter half of the hot season and in the monsoon season. The winds flow predominantly from directions between west and north during the hot season. They are mostly from directions between southwest and northwest during the southwest monsoon season. They blow mostly from the directions between northeast and southeast during the rest of the year becoming southwesterly to north westerly in January and February.

== Demographics ==
As of 2001 India census, Vaijapur had a population of 37,002. Males constitute 52% of the population and females 48%. Vaijapur has an average literacy rate of 70%, higher than the national average of 59.5%: male literacy is 77%, and female literacy is 62%. In Vaijapur, 14% of the population is under 6 years of age. Vaijapur consists of 164 villages and has 7 revenue circle. The main occupation in the tehsil area is agriculture. Marathi is the official and most widely spoken language, while Hindi, Ahirani, Marwari, Rajputi dialect and English are understood and spoken widely.

=== Religion in Vaijapur city ===
Religion in Vaijapur city (2011)
1. Hinduism (64.1%)
2. Islam (29.1%)
3. Buddhism (3.69%)
4. Jainism (2.40%)
5. Christianity (0.34%)
6. Sikhism (0.28%)
7. Others (0.10%)

=== Religion in Vaijapur Taluka ===
Religion in Vaijapur Taluka (2011)
1. Hinduism (85.0%)
2. Islam (10.2%)
3. Buddhism (3.84%)
4. Jainism (0.64%)
5. Christianity (0.14%)
6. Sikhism (0.07%)
7. Others (0.10%)

Hinduism is strong in Vaijapur Taluka with 85% which is more than Average 69% of Aurangabad district. Muslims constitute 10% of the population. Navayana Buddhism is practiced by 3–4% of the population.

== Geological setting ==
Deccan trap of the Late Cretaceous-Palaeogene comprising lava flows of basaltic composition, occupy the whole area of the tehsil. Quaternary alluvium occupies the Godavari valley and well exposed south of Vaijapur and comprises gravel beds, sands, silts, and clay.

=== Soil ===
The most important soils of the district are the black clayey soils on plains interspersed with occasional stretches of shallow soils on ridges. In the north, the soils are shallow and poor and in the south they are deep and fertile and particularly so in the Godavari valley. They are all derived from Deccan trap. The soils can be classified as light, medium and heavy according to the depth, texture and location.

=== Rivers ===
- Godavari -The Godavari forms nearly the entire southern boundary from Dongaon about 3 kilometres above Puntamba to Chendufal.
- Narangi River -The Narangi rises on the southern slopes of the water divide to the south of the Maniyad river a little above Naral village and flows past Vaijapur. A little below the latter, it is joined by the Deo nala, flowing from Nasik district. It has a fairly long south by southwesterly course before its point of entry into the Godavari is carried a little down the latter. It is joined by the Chor nala from the west and Kurla nala from the east.
- Narali-The Narali nala is a small stream rising above Jambargaon on a low divide and after passing by Virgaon joins the Godavari at Dak Pimpalgaon.
- Shivna-The Shivna is a much larger river than any of the streams mentioned above and is a master stream of the western part of Aurangabad district. The Shivna rises on the eastern slopes of the Ajanta range just east of the trijunction of Jalgaon, Nasik and Aurangabad districts above Kalanki village and has a fairly long easterly course as far as Kannad town draining the entire area lying between the Ajanta range on the north and the Surpalnath range on the south. Near Kannad it is joined by several streams draining the Ajanta range and the northern part of the Ellora range, inclusive of the one which rises on the southern slopes of the Satmala hill. South of Kannad, the Shivna after flowing beyond the eastern extremity of the Surpalnath range, is relieved of the restrictive influence of the latter and flows in a southwesterly direction as far as Baigaon, where it turns and flows almost in a southerly course up to Katepimpalgaon. Here it turns and flows in a southeasterly course to join the Godavari at Sawkheda. Thus the river has an initial easterly course, then a southwesterly course, then a southerly course and lastly a southeasterly course. These changing directions of flow depict the lines of structural lines of weakness in the basal rocks.
- Bori nala.-The westernmost significant tributary of the Shivna is Bori nala which rises above HilaIpur on the low water divide separating it from the Maniyad. Near Kolhi where the ShiynaVaijapur road crosses the Bori is located the Kolhi Project. After passing by Borsar, Bhaigaon, Parsoda and Karanjgaon it turns and flows southwards to join the Shivna above Katepimpalgaon below the confluence of the Dheku.
- Dheku-The Dheku nala rises in the Gorakhnath and Kapilanath hills of the Ajanta range above Dheku. village in Nasik district and flows in a southerly course as Tunki, where it turns and flows in southeasterly course. It covers an area of 410 km2 and lies between latitudes 12°152 N to 19°552 N and longitudes 74°452 E to 75°002 E and falls in the Survey of India Toposheet 46L/ 16 and 47I/13. The Karali nala, a similar stream flowing a little eastwards joins the Dheku. The headworks of the Dheku Project are located below this confluence and upstream of Bhatana village. Below Bhatana the river flows in a more southerly course and after running nearly parallel to the Shivna for more than 20 km., joins the latter upstream of Katepimpalgaon.
- Khari-The Khari nala rises in the Ajanta range and after an initial course in Nasik district enters this district. Soon it is joined by the Chamandara nala and the combined stream flows southeastwards and joins the Shivna near Bharagaon.
- Maniyad - Maniyad river the tributaries of the Tapi basin flowing towards north and meet Girna river in Nashik district. A Maniyad reservoir called as Vinayaksagar constructed across this river near Parala village. This reservoir is used for irrigation and supply of drinking water to part of Vaijapur taluka and also for pisciculture on lease basis.

== Irrigation projects ==
- Dheku Project

The dam is of composite type with a total length of 2583 ft having a maximum height of 48 ft at gorge portion. It is situated on Dheku river, a tributary of Shivna river near village Bhatana in Vaijapar tehsil. Its construction was started in October 1956 and completed in June 1961, the total cost being Rs. 3136 lakhs. To pass a flood discharge of 68,700 cusecs a waste weir has been constructed having a total length of 850 ft. There is one head regulator with a discharging capacity of 39 cusecs. The reservoir has one canal of a length of 15 miles on the left flank irrigating about 6700 acres from 16 village in Vaijapur tehsil. The crops irrigated under this project include jowar. bajri, mug, groundnut, maize, paddy, onion, chilli. cotton, sugarcane and wheat.

- Kolhi Project:

This dam is an earthen embankment 2592 feet long with a maximum height of 48 ft above the nala bed. Its construction was started in 1965 and was completed in 1967 at a total cost of Its. 21,30,849. The project is situated on Bor nala. a tributary of Shivna river near village Kolhi in Vaijapur tahsil. To pass the food discharge of 24.600 cuseca, a waste weir has been constructed having a total length of 525 ft. It has a left flank canal with a total length of 6 miles which would irrigate an area, of 1165 acres of the four villages in Vaijapur tehsil.

- Narangi-sarangi Project
- Manyad Storage Tank:

The dam is an earthen embankment type. It is situated on Manyad river near village Parala in Vaijapar tehsil. Its construction was started in 2002 and completed in 2003, the total cost being Rs.6.00 crore. Manyad storage tank having capacity of 6.11 thousand cubic meters out of which 5.38 thousand cubic meters is live storage. The Manyad water irrigate 880 hector land of surrounded area of Manyad valley. All water is reserve for only irrigation purpose however same nearby village having drinking water supply scheme from this storage tank include Loni Kh, Chikatgaon, Nimgaon, Tunki, Talwada. The crops irrigated under this pinclude jowar. bajri, mug, groundnut, maize, paddy, onion, chilli, cotton, sugarcane, and wheat.

== Tourist attractions ==
- Dahegaon (Bor) :- Dahegaon Bor is the birthplace of rashtrasant Jagadguru Janardan Swami (Maungiri) Maharaj, where he was born, There is a beautiful temple of him in this village, Millions of devotees come throughout the year to have their darshan.
- Shri Dakshayani Temple, Lasurgaon on Shivna riverside in Lasurgaon.
- On the Vaijapur-Shrirampur way on Godavari river, there are ancient temples on beautiful island.
- Shiur:- Ravaneshvar temple, Shiur where Ravan did Tapa.(Marathi:तप - Tap).
- Saint Shankar Maharaj Samadhi.
- Ancient Shiv and Ram mandir/temple.
- Naugaji Baba Dargah is located just outside city, the saint Naugaji Baba Is famous in and around of Vaijapur, many people pray to Baba for problems.
- Near to Vaijapur 7 km away there is Ukkadgaon small village situated on vaijapur-Kopergaon road, This place is famous for Mandir Of Devi. it is assumed that Renuka Mata of Mahur Gad came to Ukkadgaon to give Darshana to Bhakta, here also the yearly yatra will be celebrated.
- Gangagiri Maharaj Samadhi Sthal – Sarla Bet Island situated in the river to Godavari. The foundation of sarla Bet was done by Gangagiri Maharaj. His main Purpose was to bring together scattered community and make them follow the Spiritualists. He used the devotional Songs, hymns for the same very proficiently. The same was followed by every descendant of Maharaj Currently Ramgiri Maharaj is looking after the work of the Sarla Bet, Here on Sarla Bet After Gangagiri Maharaj his descendants were as Harigiriji Maharaj, Nathgiriji Maharaj, Someshwargiri Maharaj, Narayangiri Maharaj respectively, Now the Trust is well Known in all over the Maharashtra, There are two more branches of the trust at Pandharpur & Alandi Saptha. Sarla Bet can be conveniently reached from any part of by road. The town in Blessed and situated Between the World-famous Sai Baba's Shirdi & Lord Shani's Shani Shingnapur, both the towns are situated within 45–60 km radius with Sarla Bet being centrally located.
- Nagamthan:- Is a market village in vaijapur tq. of 5000-6000 inhabitants. It is in vaijapur tehasil, near about 27 km of vaijapur. This village is reside of godavari river here this is known as "Dakshin Vahini Godavari" It is surmised that nagamthan was a place of some importance in olden times. It said to have been faunded by a "Prabhu Shree Ramchandra" him eshtablish bhagwan Mahadeva's temple is situated reside the Godavari River. It is near a sanctuary containing a linga. A large number of Hindus visit it on the Mahashivratri Festival. Water of godavari stream is taken as tirth. Thursday is the weekly market day.

The village has a primary z.p. school, Marathwada Shikshan Prasarak Mandal's New High School and also a post office. The village is situated between Shirdi, the location of Sai Baba's shrine, and Shani Shingnapur, the location of a shrine to Lord Shani. Both towns are situated within 40–60 km. The Yogiraj Gangagiriji Maharaj Samadhi Sthan at Sarala Bet is situated within 7 km from Nagamthan.

- Raje Shivaji stayed Salunkhe's wada with his father Shahaji & mother Jijabai for nearly 15 days accompanying 9 sardars.
- Vaijanath temple:

The Vaijanath Mahadev temple is an antique shrine. It has a pyramidal roof rising in nine tiers with a small dome and spire at the top. The masonry is in stone and mortar and the only decorations are a series of arched recesses in plaster on the walls. A fair attended by over 3,000 persons is held on Mahashivratri in honour of Vaijanath. Entirely built of timber is the temple of Hanuman. It is reported to be nearly 100 years old.

- Bhavani temple:

Temple to Bhavani or Durgadevi has a Balbodh inscription recording its erection some 200 yews ago. The idol of the goddess is installed on a high pedestal inside the vestibule and is flanked by representations of Tuljapur and Mahur goddesses. In front of the temple is a tall lamp pillar about 50 feel in height. Repairs were carried out to the temple eight to ten years ago. A fair attended by two to three thousand persons is held on Chaitra suddha 5. The temple has about 30 acres of Inam Lands.

- Dargah of Sayyad Rukn-ud-din

The town has the dargah of Sayyad Rukn-ud-din Muslim saint. It is situated near the western gate of Vaijapur and is nine yards in length. It is covered with an horizontal arched roof and the dome is plain crowned by a high spire. The whole is surrounded by a wall. Within the enclosure are a sarai and navab khana. It is said that the tomb existed in the time of Malik Ambar, and that Aurangzeb reconstructed it of brick and chunam. A rich chanam was spread over tit, tomb by one of the Peshva, while the Raja of Indom covered it with a ghilaf or shawl made of Ahmadabad mashru. It is still preserved. Both the Muslims and the Hindus hold the saint in high reverence and the annual urus is attended by nearly 25,000 persons coming from far and near. An old masjid close by has three pointed arches and the corners contain little kiosks instead of minarets. In front is a sloping verandah. Vaija Rani, a devout princess after whom the town is believed to have been named, frequented the tomb and at her death she was buried within the precincts of the dargah. A cenotaph to the princess is to the north of the town. It is a small building, having scolloped arches and brass-bound pillars. Among the mosques, the Jumma masjid is the largest. Its porch is neatly carved with floral sculpture. There is a Persian inscription over the entrance but unfortunately it contains no date. Vaijapur has also a large idgah built in 1787 by Sayyad Jafar Khan. There are some minor Hindu shrines too.

- Biloni is a village of Vaijapur taluka. at biloni Hindu God Mata Tuljabhwani Temple, is about 200 or 250 years old. Biloni is from Vaijapur above 15 km and from Aurangabad about 67 km. you can go to Biloni by road. Biloni is cover by mountain and forest. Biloni is in develop state.
- Aghur is a village in Vaijapur Tq. of approx. 3000 inhabitants. The Head Office Of Z.P. School Is Located In Aghur. The Aghureshwar Mahadev Mandir A Prominent Temple Of Bhagwan Shiva Carved Hundreds Of Year Ago With One Single Stone Is Also Located In Aghur. The temple is surrounded by beautifully carved stone statues of Bhagwan Indra, Bhagwan Ganesha, Nandi, hagwan Vishnu, Devi Parvati, Devi Sarswati, Devi Laxmi also a giant elephant statue carved of one single stone. Beside the Temple is a carved well locally called as Barrao.

The name of the village 'Aghur' is derived from the name of Shri Aghureshwar Mahadev.

- Wakala is a market village of 3,069 inhabitants in 1971 in Vaijapur tahsil lying about 24 miles north of Vaijapur town. In its vicinity is a large timed tomb which is probably among the earliest in the district, as it indicates a combination of the Hindu and early Pathan styles of architecture. The main building is 26 feet square. On each face it has three arched recesses, with corresponding recesses higher up, in the portion that rises above the arcaded verandah which surrounds it on all the sides. In the recesses, of each angle there are seven tombs, with nine other tombs at the entrance, giving a total of 28 tombs in the makbara. The cornice is supported on brackets, and the parapet is perforated with a series of pointed arches on pillars. Rising above the roof is an octagonal band containing arched recesses and little pavilions at the angles, and from this springs a horse-shoe dome with its base adorned by lotus leaves. On each side of the verandah there are five horizontal arches standing on moulded stone pillars. Above is a sloping cornice supported on ornamental brackets. A neat parapet runs all round the verandah terrace, the corner angles being adorned with little domes resembling the large dome of the main building. The basement is high and a portico in front is ascended at the sides by a flight of nine steps either way. An adjoining stream called Bhimakund is held sacred by the Hindus. A small and plain cave temple close by has a sanctuary containing a linga. A large number of Hindus visit it on the Mahashivratri festival. Water of the stream is taken as tirth. Friday is the weekly market day.

- Parala is a village of 2100 inhabitants, according to 2001 census, in Vaijapur tahsil situated about 30 km north-west of Vaijapur. It is surmised that Parala was a place of some importance in olden times. It is said to have been founded by a father of Vyas Rushi, Maharshi Parashar and named after him. A temple of Pareshwar Mahadeva is situated on bank of small tributaries of maniyad river. Parala is previously famous for cotton and now for Manyad Dam. The village has a primary school and a post office. Drinking water is obtained from the river and wells.Heulandite Mineral of Zeolite group found in hilly area, the piece of this mineral is very esthetic, with a group of crystals grown in a very aerial form at one end of the matrix. It has a magnificent luster and curious zonal changes of color. Scolecite, Stilbite and abundant zeolite in the tholeiitic basalt are reported.

- Bhagur is a village of 2637 population, according to 2001 census, in Vaijapur tahsil situated about 20 km Southeast of Vaijapur. The Head Office Of Z.P. School Is Located In Bhagur.
- Babhulgaon Bk(Pirache) :-This village has a dargah of Dawal Malik Baba, The devotees come from Maharashtra and pray to Baba for their various problems.Every Thursday the devotees complete their vow and this day is villages weekly market day....

== Transport ==
Vaijapur is connected by roads with various major cities of Maharashtra and other states. Mumbai–Nagpur Expressway passes through the tehsil. Vaijapur has road connectivity to Nashik, Pune, Ahmednagar, Malegaon, Jalgaon, Mumbai, Shirdi and is also being developed.

- Mumbai - Aurangabad
- Nashik - Nirmal
- Malegaon - Aurangabad
- Shrirampur- Vaijapur
- Nandgaon- Vaijapur
- Shivoor- Rajapur-Manmad
- Vaijapur - Aurangabad(via Gangapur distance=76)
- Mumbai - Aurangabad - Nagpur

== Rail ==
In the early twentieth century cotton was the largest export of Hyderabad State; the cotton industry held an important place in the eyes of Nizam's Hyderabad Government. The Hyderabad-Godavari Valley Railway was established by the Nizam of Hyderabad as a part of The Nizam's Guaranteed State Railway a company under the guarantee of the Hyderabad State. Vaijapur is part of Nizam state. Now the Manmad-Kachiguda Railway Station Broad gauge railway line which emanates from the Mumbai-Bhusawal-Howrah trunk route at Manmad is an important artery of traffic in Vaijapur tehsil of Aurangabad district. Rotegaon (station code:RGO) is a nearest station located on the Secunderabad-Manmad section of the Nanded Division of South Central Railway zone of the Indian Railways. Vaijapur has rail connectivity with Mumbai, Hyderabad. It is also connected to Manmad, Nanded, Parli, Nagpur, Nizamabad, Nashik, Pune, Baroda, Narsapur. But there is still a demand for direct rail connectivity to other major cities of India. The Jalna - Mumbai vande Bharat train is the fastest train connecting it with Mumbai is yet to be having stop to here.

- Mumbai - Hingoli Deccan - Mumbai - Janshatabdi Express - Daily - Up & Down (Stop yet to be)
- Nandigram Express - Via - Aurangabad to Mumbai - Daily Service
- Devgiri Express - Via - Aurangabad to Mumbai - Daily Service
- Tapovan Express - daily service

== Schools and colleges ==
- Public International English School
- Vinayakrao Patil Science, Arts & Commerce Mahavidyalaya, Vaijapur
- MIT College of Engineering, Rotegaon
- Raje Sambhaji College, Aghur
- Raje Sambhaji Highschool, Aghur
- Matoshri College of Pharmacy, Aghur
- Z.P.Prathamik Government School, Aghur
- Padmavati BEd College, Aghur
- Nandakumar Shinde College of Pharmacy, Aghur
- Halqa-e-Dawanaik Urdu Primary School, Vaijapur
- H.D. Urdu Girl's High School Vaijapur
- Ayesha Urdu Primary School Vaijapur
- Naughazi Baba Urdu Primary School Vaijapur
- Saint Monica English Highschool, Vaijapur
- J. K. Jadhav College, Vaijapur
- Deogiri Global Academy
- Arohan Academy
- Shri Swami Samarth Vidyalaya
- Sanjivani Academy, Vaijapur
- Karuna Niketan Primary and Secondary Highschool, Vaijapur
- New High School & jr college Dahegaon
- Chhatrapati shahu arts, commerce and science jr. College vaijapur
- Z. P. H. S Borsar
