= Kachner Jain Temple =

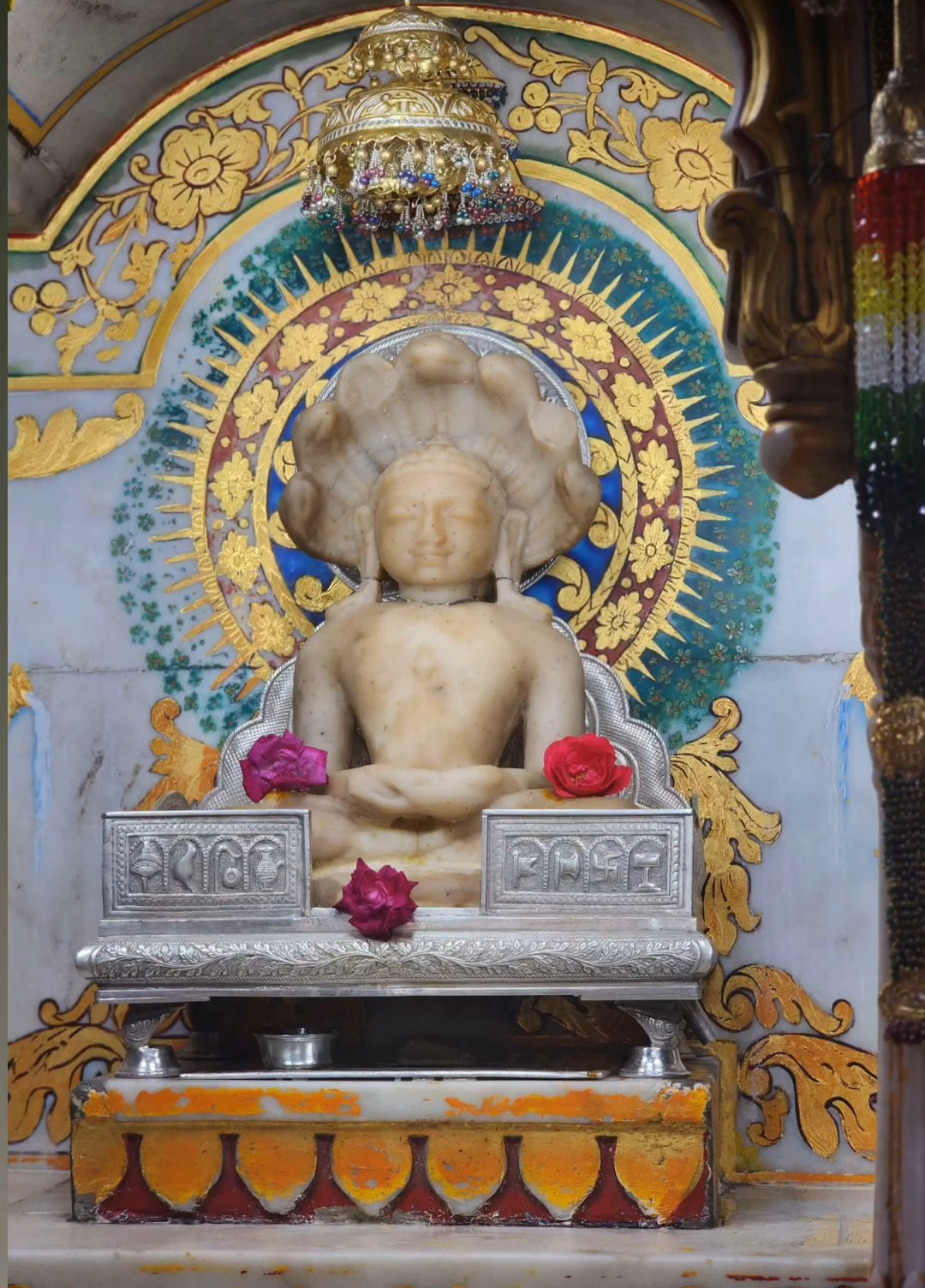
- Parshvanatha idol at Kachner Jain Temple

Religion
- Affiliation: Jainism
- Sect: Digambara
- Deity: Parshvanatha
- Governing body: Shri 1008 Chintamani Parshvanath Digamber Jain Atishay Kshetra Kachner Trust

Location
- Location: Kachner, Chhatrapati Sambhajinagar

Architecture
- Established: 13th century

Kachner Jain Temple is a Jain temple dedicated to Parshvanatha, the 23rd Tirthankara of Jainism, at Kachner in Chhatrapati Sambhajinagar district, Maharashtra, India.

== Temple ==
Kachner is an important Jain centre in the Marathwada region, with a history dating to the 13th century CE. Kachner enshrines a seven-hooded serpent Parshvanatha seated in padmasana with canopy of a five-hooded serpent. An annual three-day fair is held here.

== See also ==
- Nemgiri
- Mangi-Tungi
- Gajpanth
