= Tomb of Aurangzeb =

Tomb in Khuldabad, Maharashtra, India

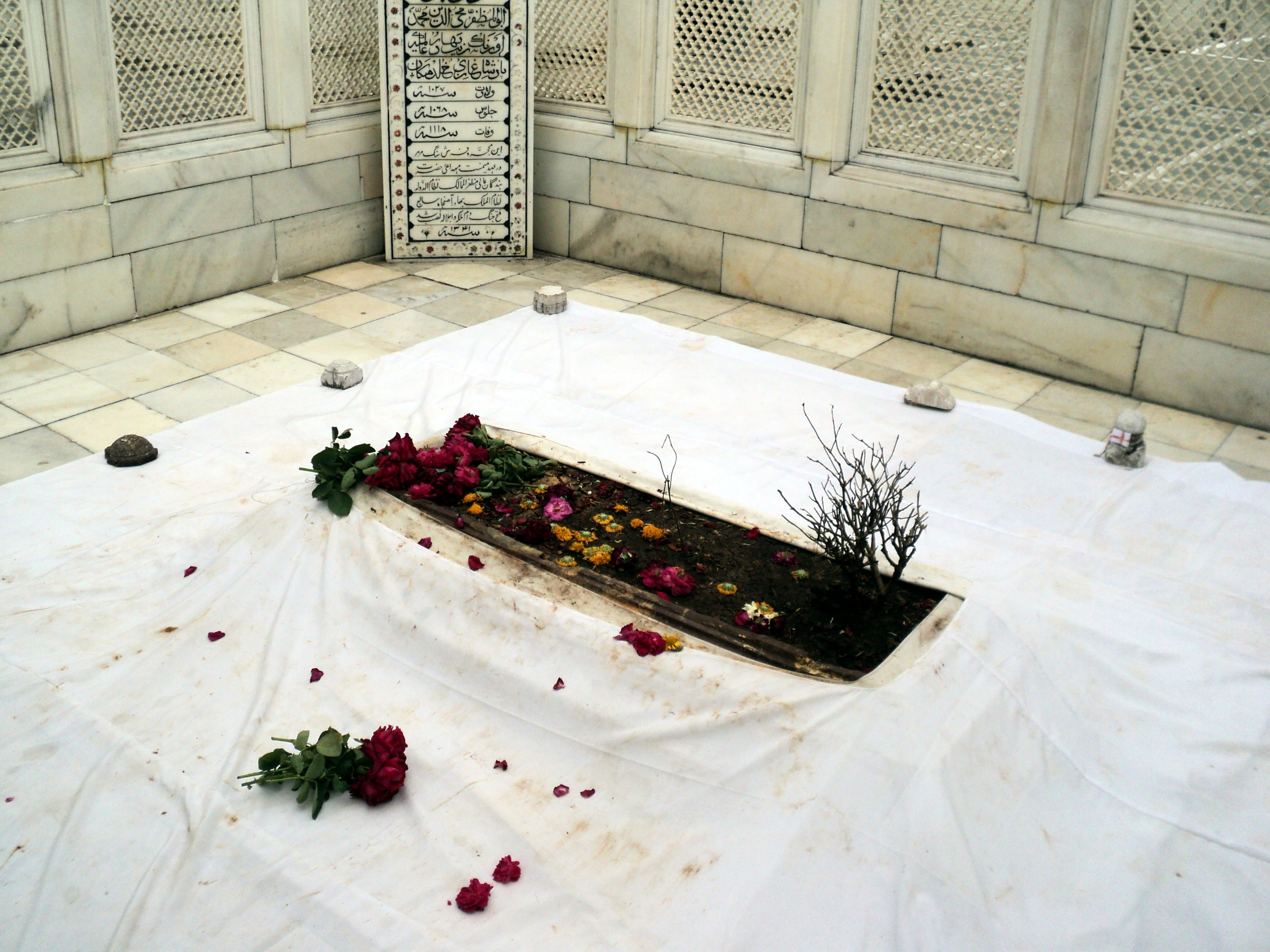
- Tomb of Aurangzeb

General information
- Type: Tomb
- Architectural style: Mughal
- Location: Khuldabad, Aurangabad district, Maharashtra, India
- Coordinates: 20°0′18.13″N 75°11′29.04″E
- Construction started: 4 March 1707
- Completed: 1707
- Opened: 1707

Design and construction
- Architect: Azam Shah

The Tomb of Aurangzeb is located in Khuldabad, Aurangabad district, Maharashtra, India. In notable contrast to other Mughal tombs, which are large monuments of Mughal architecture, including the Taj Mahal, at his own direction Aurangzeb is buried in an unmarked grave at the complex of the dargah or shrine of Sheikh Zainuddin.

== Background ==
Aurangzeb (3 November 1618 – 3 March 1707), the sixth Mughal emperor, ruled most of the Indian subcontinent for half a century until he died on 3 March 1707. According to his wish, he was buried near the dargah of Sheikh Zainuddin, a Sufi who was also his "spiritual and religious teacher".

== Location ==
The tomb is located in the city of Khuldabad, in the district of Aurangabad, 24 kilometres (15 mi) from Aurangabad. It is located in the south-eastern corner of the complex of the dargah of Sheikh Zainuddin.

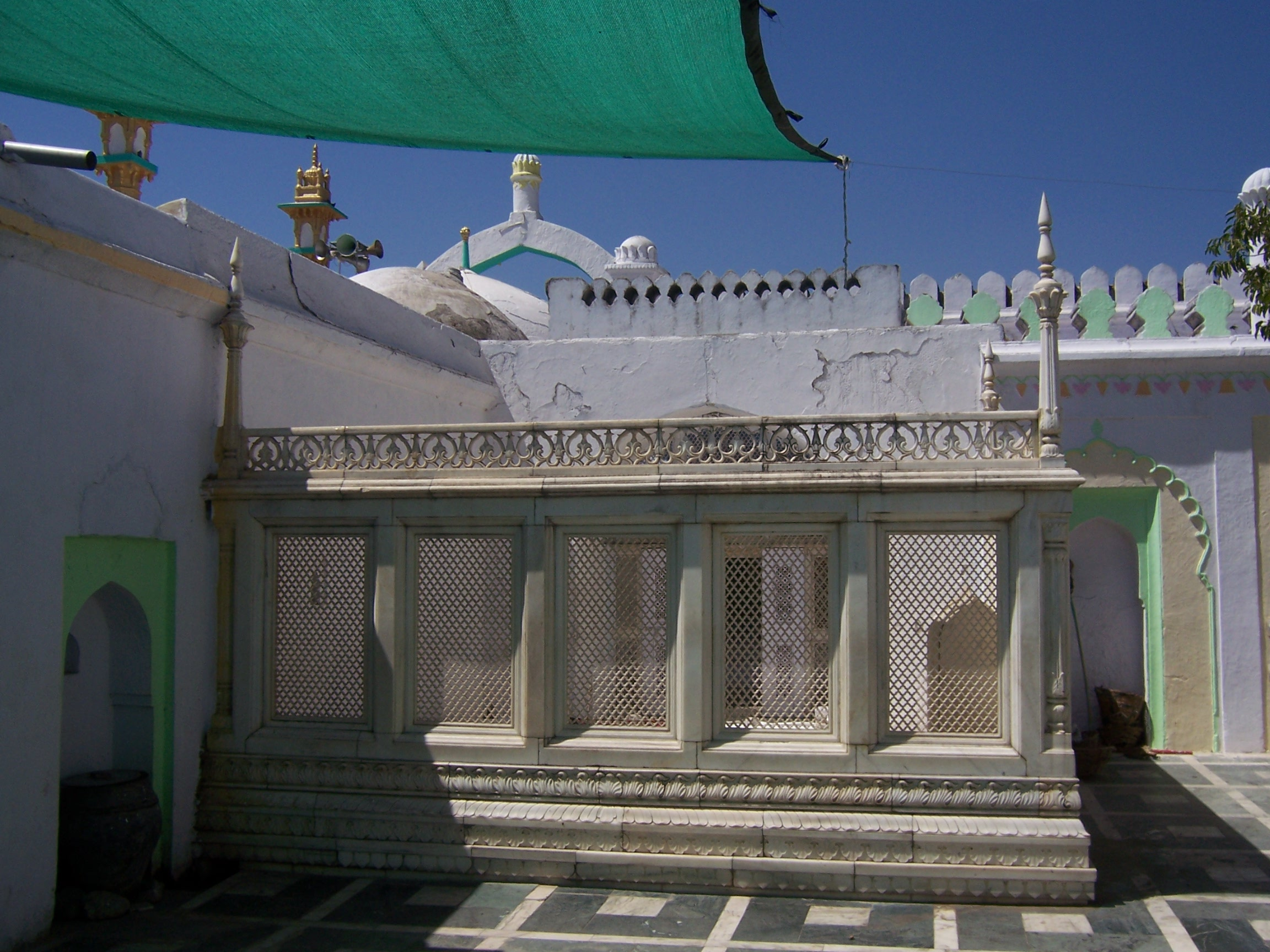
Aurangzeb's Tomb, with marble jaali (latticed screen) around it.

== Description ==
Aurangzeb died in 1707 at Ahmednagar. His body was then carried to Khuldabad after his son Azam Shah and his daughter Zeenat-un-Nissa arrived at their father's camp.

There is a platform over the tomb made of red stone, less than three yards in length. There is also a "cavity" in the middle which measures a "few fingers". Inspired by the grave of his sister Jahanara Begum, the tomb has been covered with soil on which herbs grow. After his burial, Aurangzeb was given the posthumous title of "Khuld-makan" ("he whose abode is in eternity"). Lord Curzon later covered the site with marble and surrounded it with a "pierced marble screen". The tomb is roofed by "the vault of the sky". The gateway and the domed porch were added in 1760.

It is said that Aurangzeb paid for his burial place by stitching caps during his last years and that it cost only 14 rupees and 12 annas. The tomb is "remarkably simple in keeping with Aurangzeb's own wishes". Aurangzeb's full name is written on a marble plate located in one of the corners of the tomb.

The dargah also houses the tomb of the first Nizam of Hyderabad, Asaf Jah I, his son Nasir Jung, and those of Aurangzeb's son Muhammad Azam Shah and his wife.

== In literature ==
In her poetical illustration, The Tomb of Aurangzebe, Letitia Elizabeth Landon may have been confused by the engraving she was given (from a painting by Samuel Prout), as in it she justifies the construction of mighty tombs.
