= Aurangabad district, Maharashtra =

Aurangabad district
- District
- Chhatrapati Sambhajinagar district
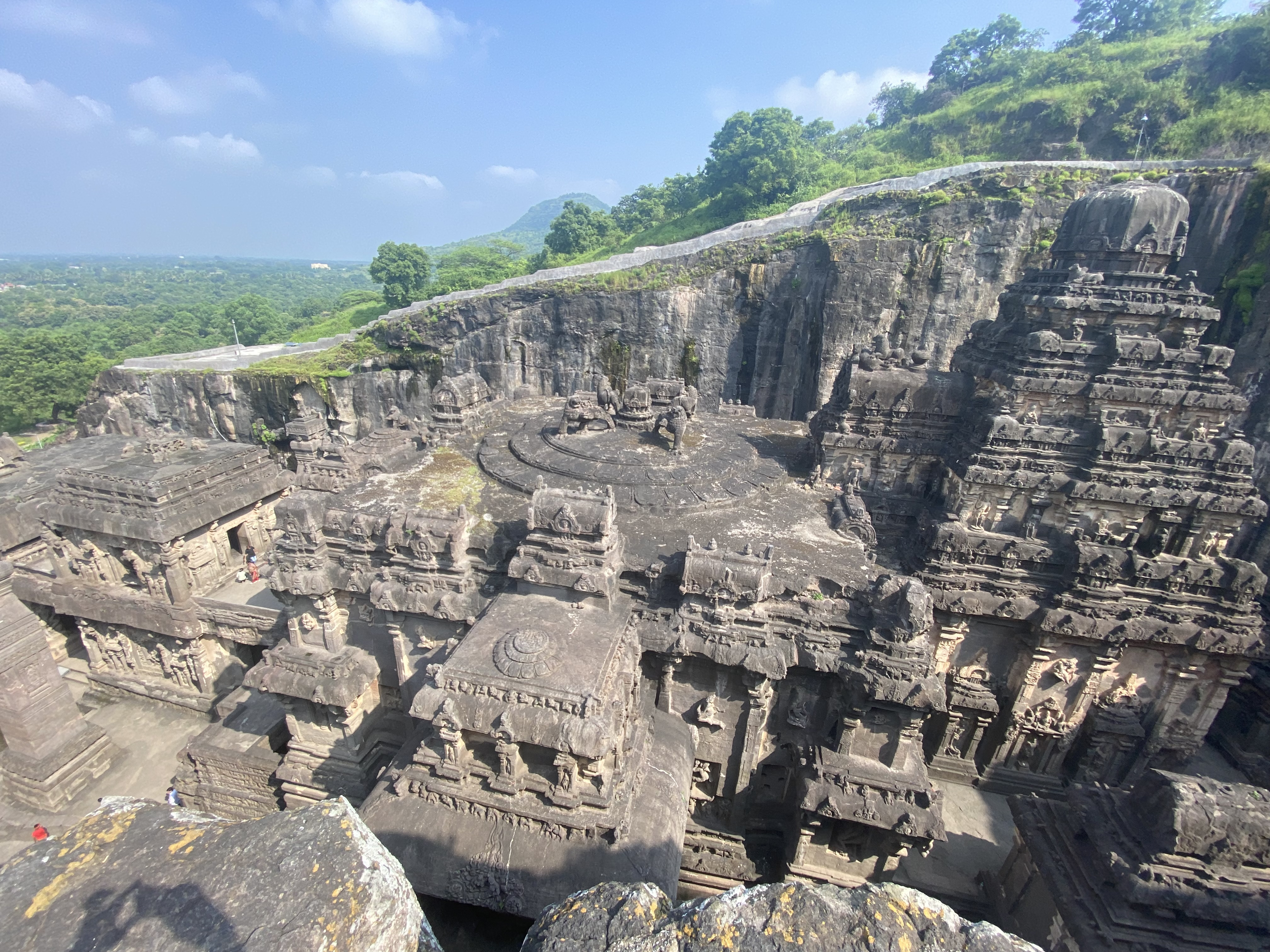
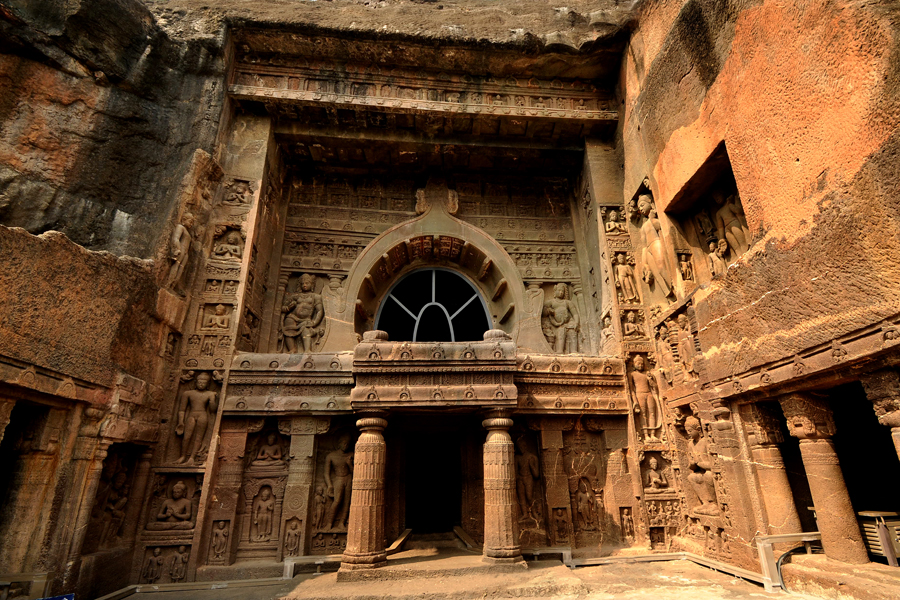
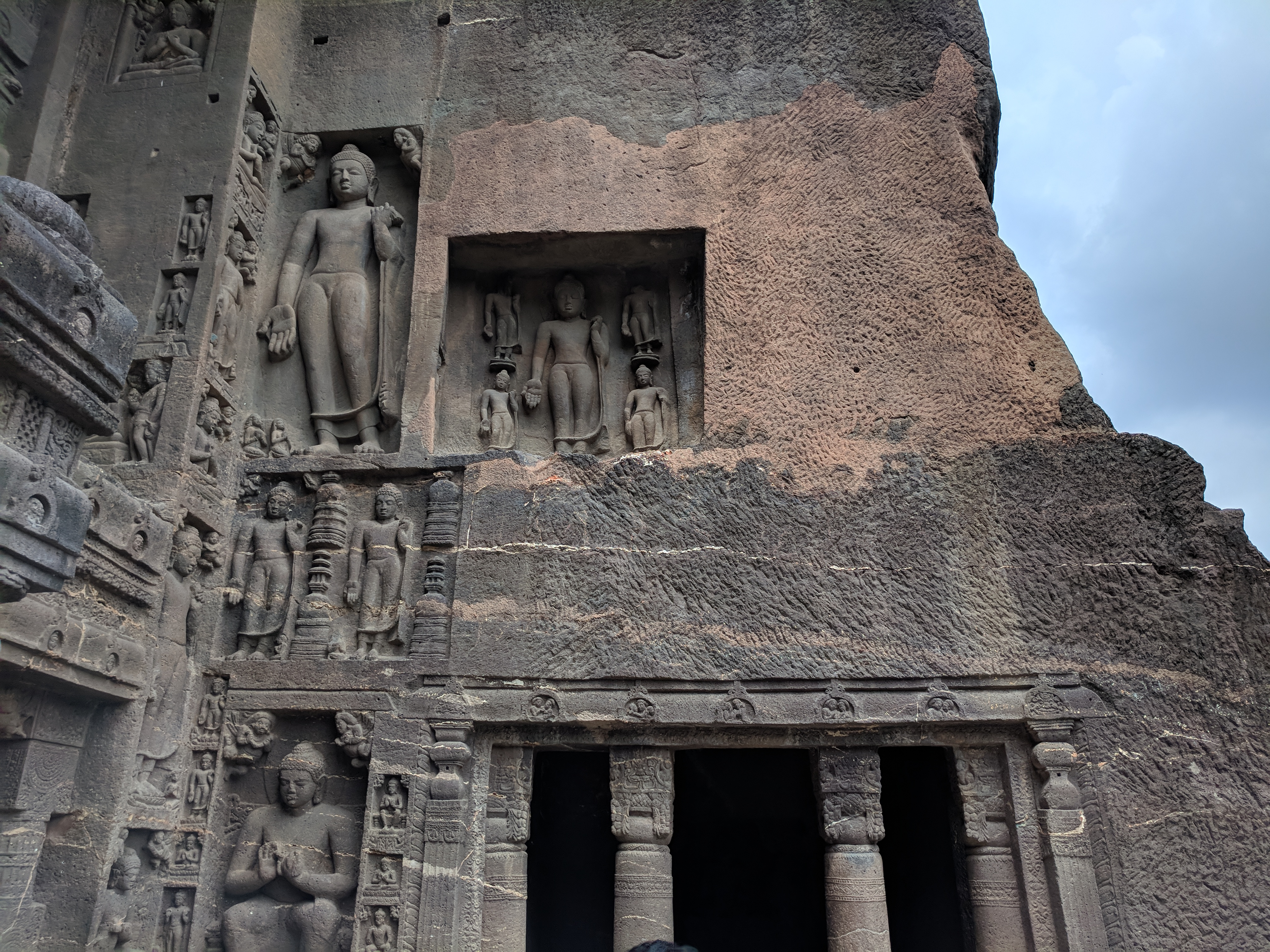
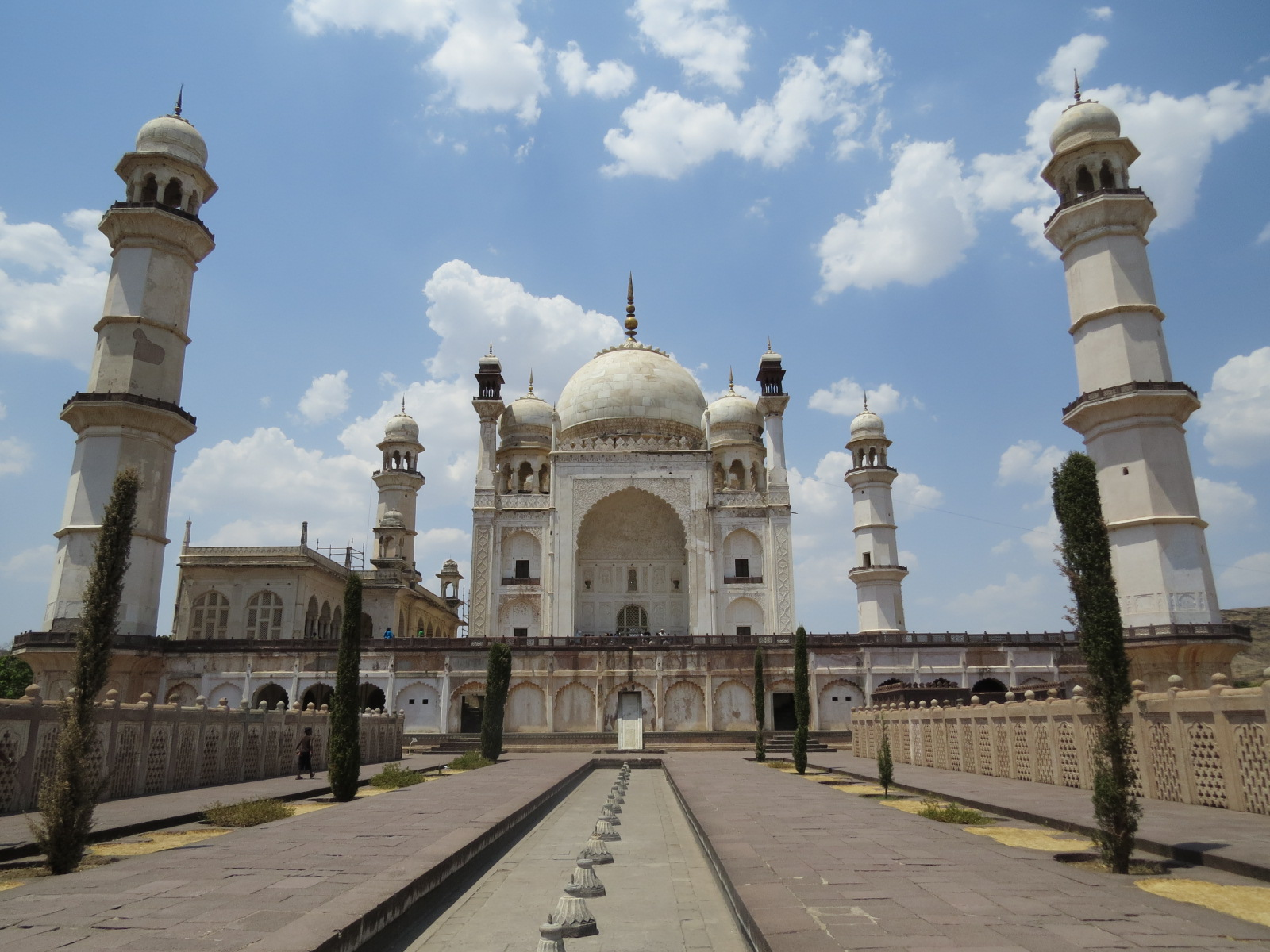
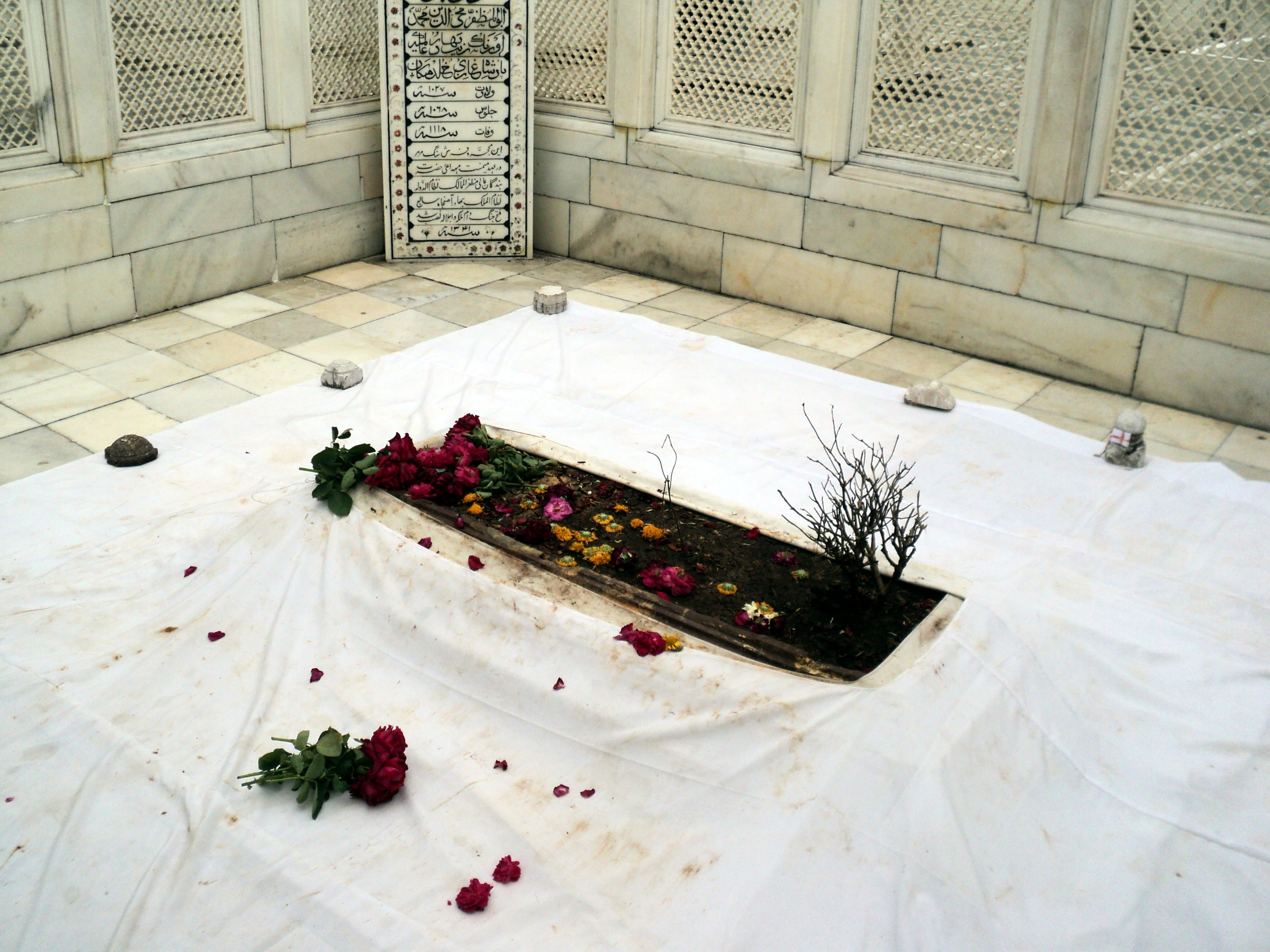
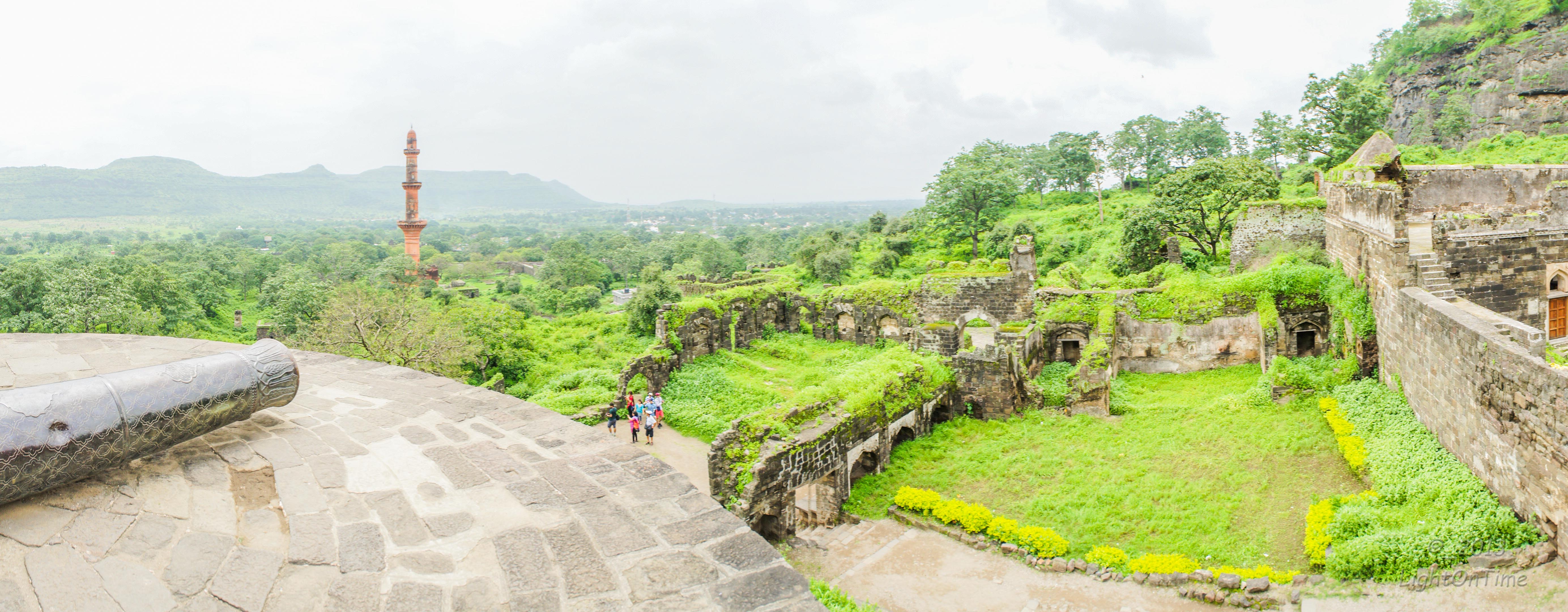
- From top, left to right: Kailasha temple at the Ellora Caves; facade of Ajanta Cave 19; Buddha carvings to the right of Cave 19's entrance; Bibi Ka Maqbara; Tomb of Emperor Aurangzeb Alamgir, Khuldabad; Daulatabad Fort
- Interactive map of Aurangabad district
- Country: India
- State: Maharashtra
- Division: Aurangabad
- Headquarters: Aurangabad
- Tehsils: List of tehsils: Aurangabad; Paithan; Vaijapur; Gangapur; Khuldabad; Phulambri; Kannad; Sillod; Soegaon

Government
  - Body: Chhatrapati Sambhajinagar Zilla Parishad
  - Guardian Minister: Abdul Sattar; Additional charge (Cabinet Minister)
  - President Zilla Parishad: President Meena Shelke; Vice-President Lahanu Gaikwad
  - District collector: Deelip Swami (IAS)
  - CEO Zilla Parishad: Nilesh R. Gatne (IAS)
  - MPs: Sandipanrao Bhumre (Aurangabad); Kalyan Kale (Jalna)

Area
  - Total: 10,100 km^{2} (3,900 sq mi)

Population (2011)
  - Total: 3,701,282
  - Density: 366/km^{2} (949/sq mi)
  - Urban: 37.53%

Demographics
  - Literacy: 79.02%
  - Sex ratio: 924
- Time zone: UTC+05:30 (IST)
- Vehicle registration: MH-20 (Aurangabad); MH-57 (Vaijapur)
- Major highways: NH-211
- Official Language: Marathi
- Per capita income(Aurangabad district): INR 1,63,325(2019–20)
- Nominal gross domestic product(Aurangabad district): INR 98,804 crores (2022–23)
- Website: chhatrapatisambhajinagar.maharashtra.gov.in

Aurangabad district (Marathi pronunciation: [əu̯ɾəŋɡaːbaːd̪]), officially known as Chhatrapati Sambhajinagar district, is one of the 36 districts of the state of Maharashtra in western India. It borders the districts of Nashik to the west, Jalgaon to the north, Jalna to the east, and Ahmednagar to the south. The city of Aurangabad houses the district's administrative headquarters. The district has an area of 10,100 km^{2}, of which 37.55% is urban and the rest is rural. Aurangabad District is a major tourism region in Marathwada, with attractions including the Ajanta Caves and Ellora Caves.

== Geography ==
Aurangabad District is located mainly in the Godavari River Basin and partly in the Tapti River Basin. The district is located between 19 and 20 degrees north longitude and between 74 and 76 degrees east latitude, covering an area of 10,100 km^{2}.

=== Geology ===
==== Geological formations ====
Aurangabad District lies on the Deccan Plateau and is covered by the Deccan Traps, which formed during the Late Cretaceous and Lower Eocene ages. Thin alluvial deposits lie above the Deccan Traps along the major rivers. The basaltic lava flows belonging to the Deccan Traps are the only major geological formation in the district. The lava flows are horizontal, with each flow featuring two distinct layers. The upper layer consists of vesicular and amygdule zeolitic basalt, while the lower layer consists of massive basalt.

==== Elevation and mountains ====
The average height of southern portion of the district is between 600 and 670 metres. The district features four distinct mountains:

- Antur – 827 m
- Abbasgad – 671 m
- Satonda – 552 m
- Ajintha – 578 m

==== Rivers ====
The major rivers in Aurangabad District are the Godavari, Purna, Shivana, and Kham rivers.

The Narangi River rises on the southern slopes of the water divide south of the Maniyad River near the village of Naral. It flows past Vaijapur, where it is joined by the Deo Nala River from Nasik District. The Narangi follows a long south-southwesterly course before its point of entry into the Godavari. It is joined by the Chor nala from the west and the Kurla nala from the east, continuing the trend of the Kurla River after the Kurla's confluence.

=== Climate ===
The rainy season lasts from June through September and the average rainfall is 734 mm. The temperature ranges from 14 to 40 degrees Celsius on average. The winter season is from October to February and the summer season is from March to May.

Climate data for Aurangabad
Month	Jan	Feb	Mar	Apr	May	Jun	Jul	Aug	Sep	Oct	Nov	Dec	Year
Mean daily maximum °C (°F)	29.7 (85.5)	32.5 (90.5)	36.1 (97.0)	39.0 (102.2)	39.9 (103.8)	34.9 (94.8)	30.3 (86.5)	29.1 (84.4)	30.4 (86.7)	32.6 (90.7)	30.9 (87.6)	29.3 (84.7)	32.9 (91.2)
Mean daily minimum °C (°F)	14.2 (57.6)	16.3 (61.3)	20.2 (68.4)	23.7 (74.7)	24.6 (76.3)	23.0 (73.4)	21.8 (71.2)	21.1 (70.0)	20.9 (69.6)	19.7 (67.5)	16.4 (61.5)	14.0 (57.2)	19.7 (67.5)
Average precipitation mm (inches)	2.2 (0.09)	2.9 (0.11)	5.1 (0.20)	6.3 (0.25)	25.5 (1.00)	131.4 (5.17)	167.0 (6.57)	165.0 (6.50)	135.3 (5.33)	52.6 (2.07)	29.3 (1.15)	8.4 (0.33)	731.0 (28.78)
Source: IMD

== Demographics ==
Historical population
Year	Pop.	±% p.a.
1901	444,492	—
1911	533,331	+1.84%
1921	436,921	−1.97%
1931	579,857	+2.87%
1941	656,289	+1.25%
1951	714,894	+0.86%
1961	943,092	+2.81%
1971	1,241,195	+2.78%
1981	1,589,754	+2.51%
1991	2,218,615	+3.39%
2001	2,902,602	+2.72%
2011	3,701,282	+2.46%

According to the 2011 census, Aurangabad District has a population of 3,701,282 inhabitants and a population density of 365 inhabitants per square kilometre (950/sq mi). It is the 72nd most populous district in India out of 640, and the population growth rate between 2001 and 2011 was 27.33%. The district has a sex ratio of 917 females for every 1000 males and a literacy rate of 79.02%. 43.77% of the population live in urban areas. Scheduled Castes and Scheduled Tribes make up 14.57% and 3.87% of the population respectively.

=== Religions ===
Religions in Aurangabad district (2011)
Religion	Percent
Hinduism	68.77%
Islam	21.25%
Buddhism	8.35%
Jainism	0.84%
Christianity	0.43%
Other or not stated	0.36%

According to the 2011 census, Hinduism is the most followed religion in the district and is practised by 69.77% of the population. Other popular religions include Islam (21.25%), Buddhism (8.35%) and Jainism (0.84%). In rural areas, Hindus are nearly 80% of the population while Muslims are nearly 15% of the population.

=== Languages ===
Languages in Aurangabad district (2011)
1. Marathi (69.7%)
2. Urdu (14.5%)
3. Hindi (9.49%)
4. Lambadi (2.57%)
5. 'Other' Hindi (1.06%)
6. Others (2.71%)

As of the 2011 Census of India, 69.66% of the population in the district speaks Marathi, 14.51% Urdu, 9.49% Hindi and 2.57% Lambadi as their first language. 1.06% of the population recorded their language as 'Others' under Hindi.

== Government and politics ==
=== Administrative divisions ===
The district comprises nine tehsils: Kannad, Soyagaon, Sillod, Phulambri, Aurangabad, Khuldabad, Vaijapur, Gangapur, and Paithan. The new proposal for tehsil is lasur and pishor. The big towns were divide from gangapur tehsil and kannad tehsil

Nine Maharashtra Vidhan Sabha constituencies are located in this district: Sillod, Kannad, Phulambri, Aurangabad Central, Aurangabad West, Aurangabad East, Paithan, Gangapur, and Vaijapur.

The Vidhan Sabha constituencies are grouped into two Lok Sabha constituencies: Aurangabad and Jalna.

==== Villages ====
- Deulgaon Bazar
- Koli Bodkha

=== Officers ===
==== Members of Parliament ====
- Sandipanrao Bhumre, Shiv Sena Shinde Group
  (Aurangabad)
- Kalyan Kale, INC
  (Jalna)

==== Guardian Minister ====
Guardian Minister Aurangabad
- Emblem of India
- Incumbent; Abdul Sattar; Additional Charge since 4 June 2024
- Style: The Honourable
- Residence: Aurangabad
- Appointer: Chief Minister of Maharashtra
- Term length: 5 years / No time limit
- Website: aurangabad.gov.in/en/

===== list of Guardian Minister =====
Name	Term of office
Radhakrishna Vikhe Patil	7 November 2009– 10 November 2010
Rajendra Darda	11 November 2010– 26 September 2014
Ramdas Kadam	5 December 2014 - 8 November 2019
Subhash Desai	9 January 2020 - 29 June 2022
Sandipanrao Bhumre	24 September 2022- 4 June 2024
Abdul Sattar; Additional charge	4 June 2024- Incumbent

=== District Magistrate/Collector ===
District Magistrate / Collector Aurangabad
- Emblem of India
- Incumbent; Deelip Swami (IAS)
- Residence: At Aurangabad District
- Appointer: Government of Maharashtra
- Term length: No time limit
- Website: aurangabad.gov.in/en/

== Tourism ==
There are many points of interest in Aurangabad District, including temples, villages, gardens, and sanctuaries.

=== Indian rock-cut architecture ===
Ajanta Caves, Aurangabad Caves and Ellora Caves

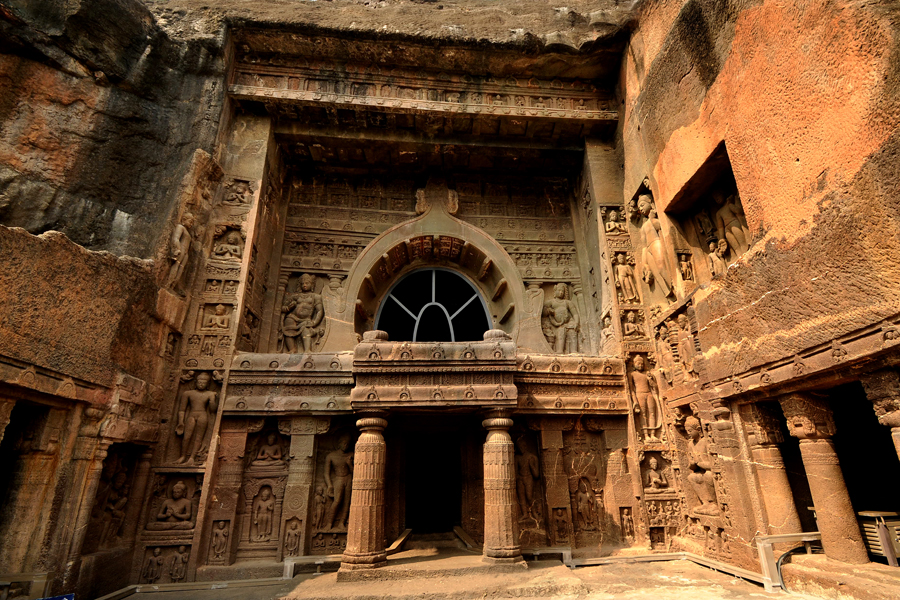
The Ajanta Caves are 30 rock-cut Buddhist cave monuments built during rule of the Vakatakas.

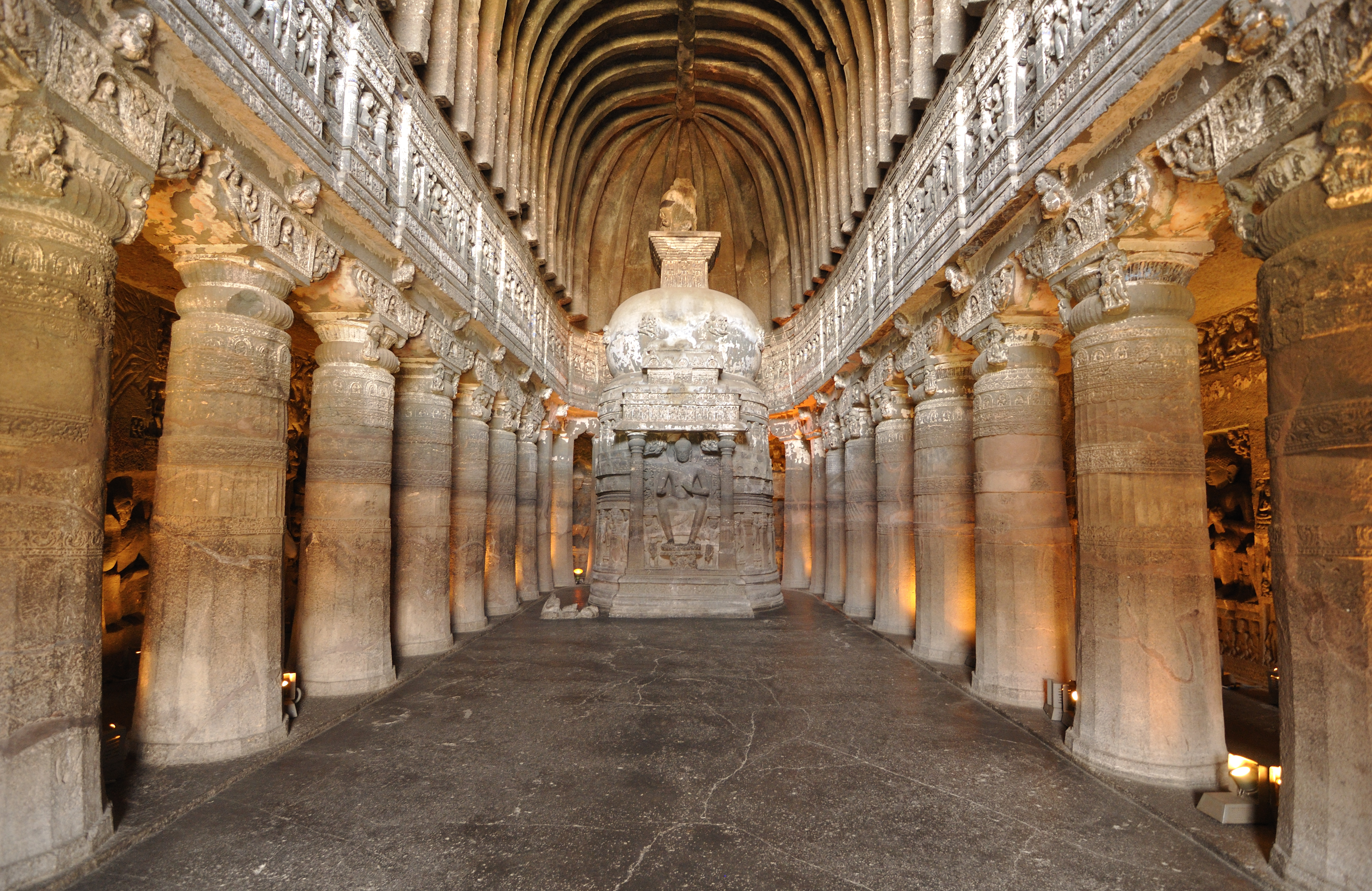
Buddhist "Chaitya Griha" (prayer hall) with a seated Buddha in Cave 26 of the Ajanta Caves.

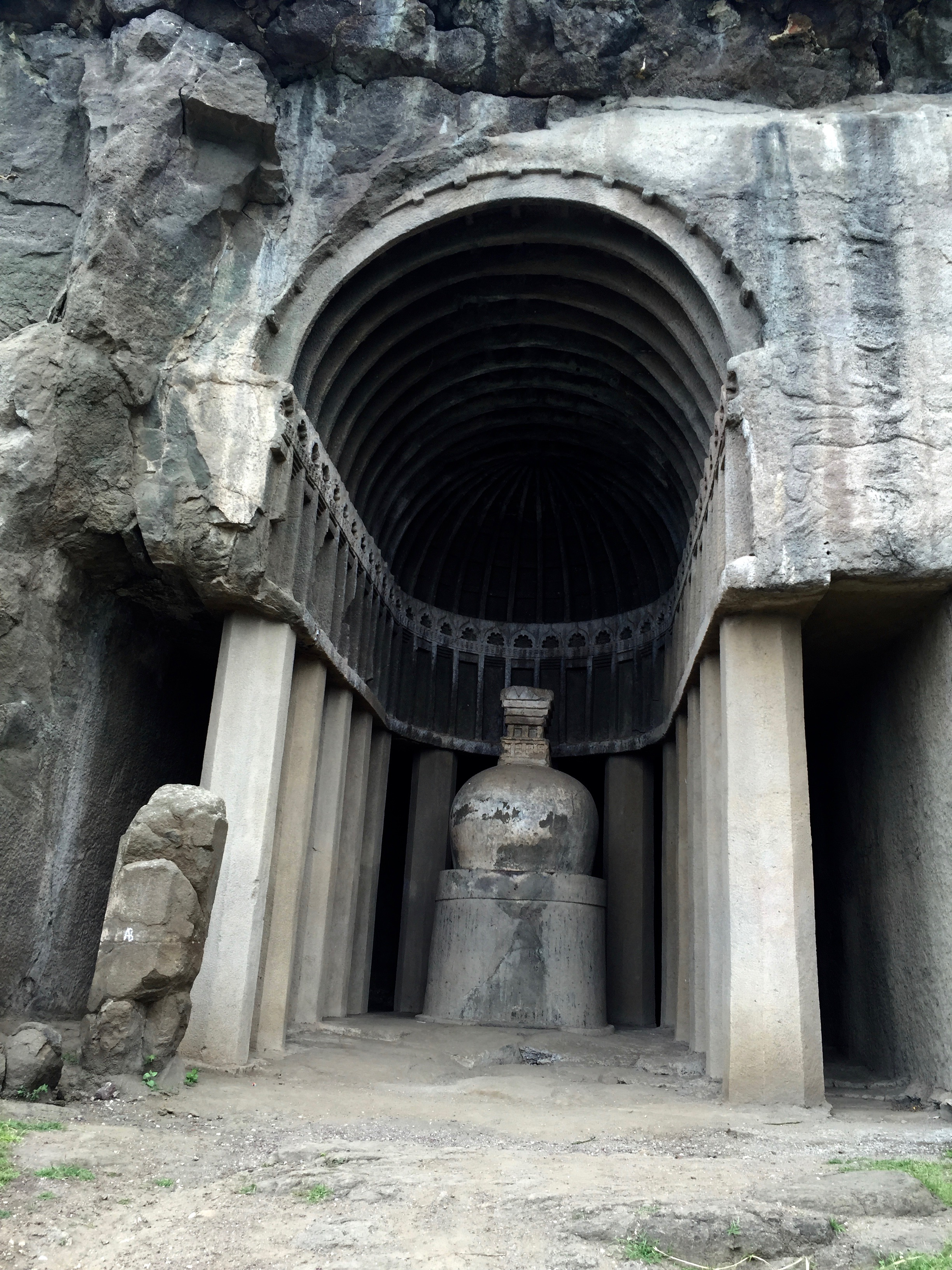
Chaitya with stupa, Cave 4, Aurangabad Caves.

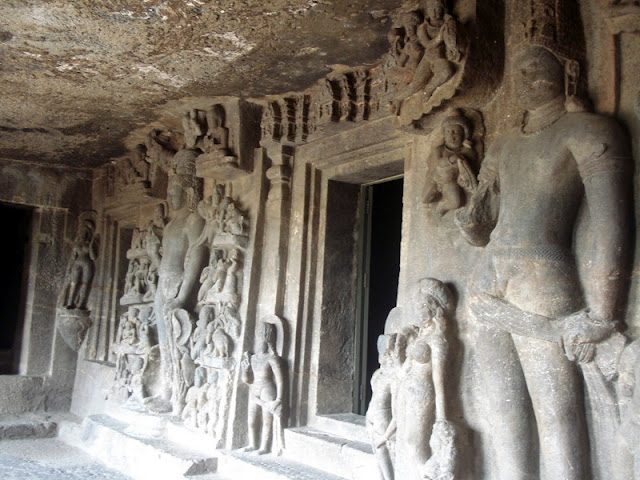
Various sculptures next to an entrance at Aurangabad Caves.

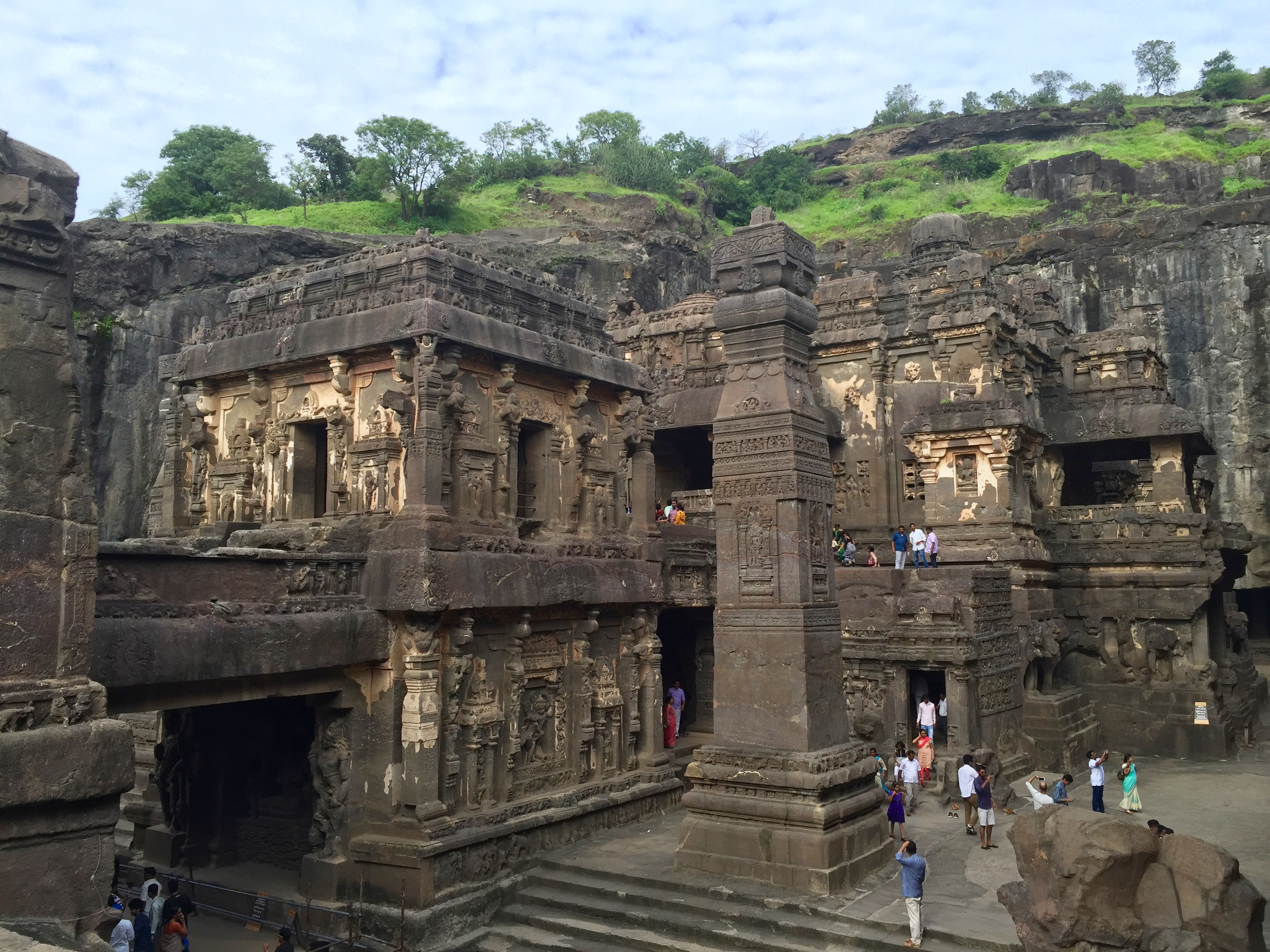
Central pillar near Kailasa temple at Ellora Caves.

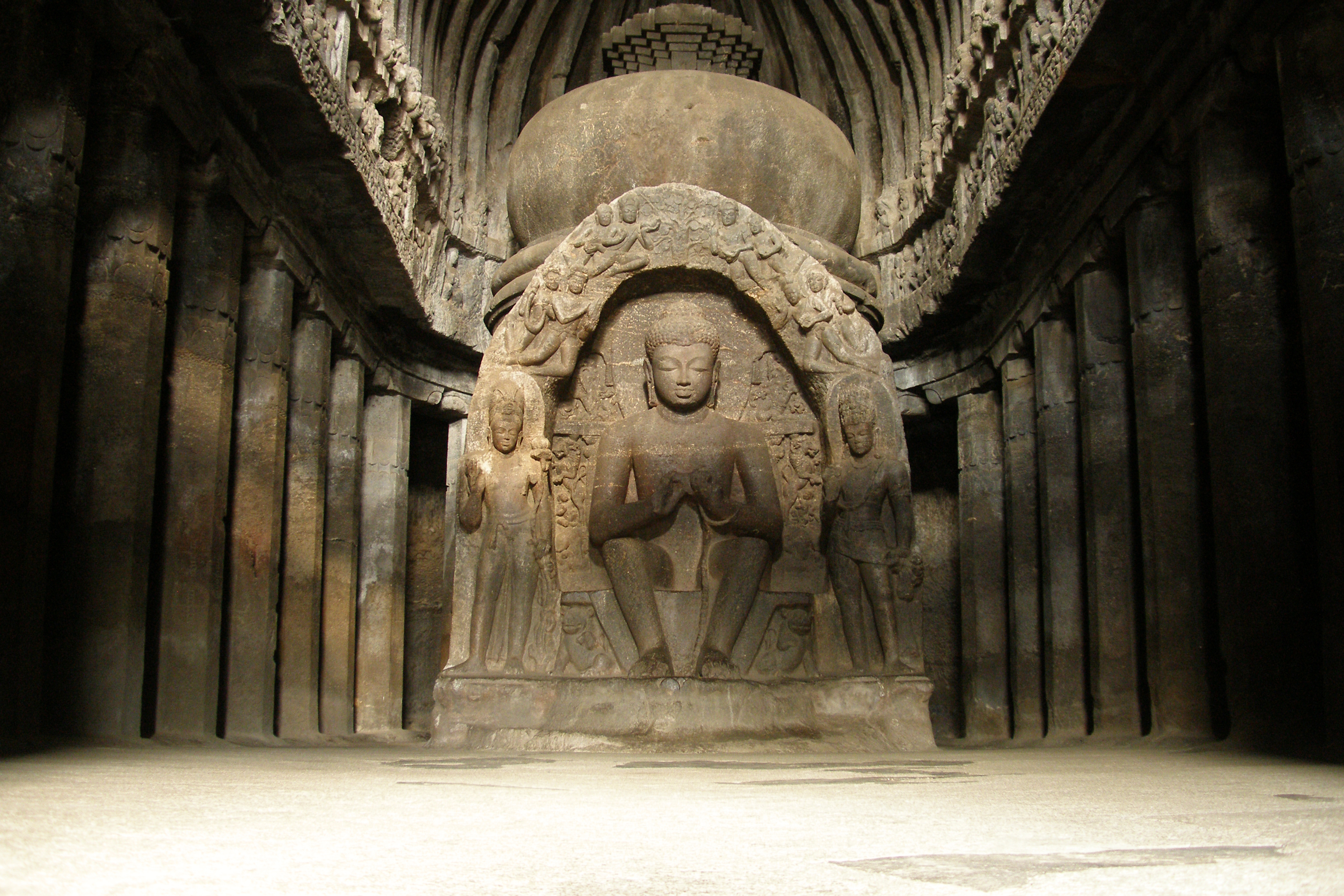
Statue of the Buddha seated. Part of the Carpenter's cave (Buddhist Cave 10).

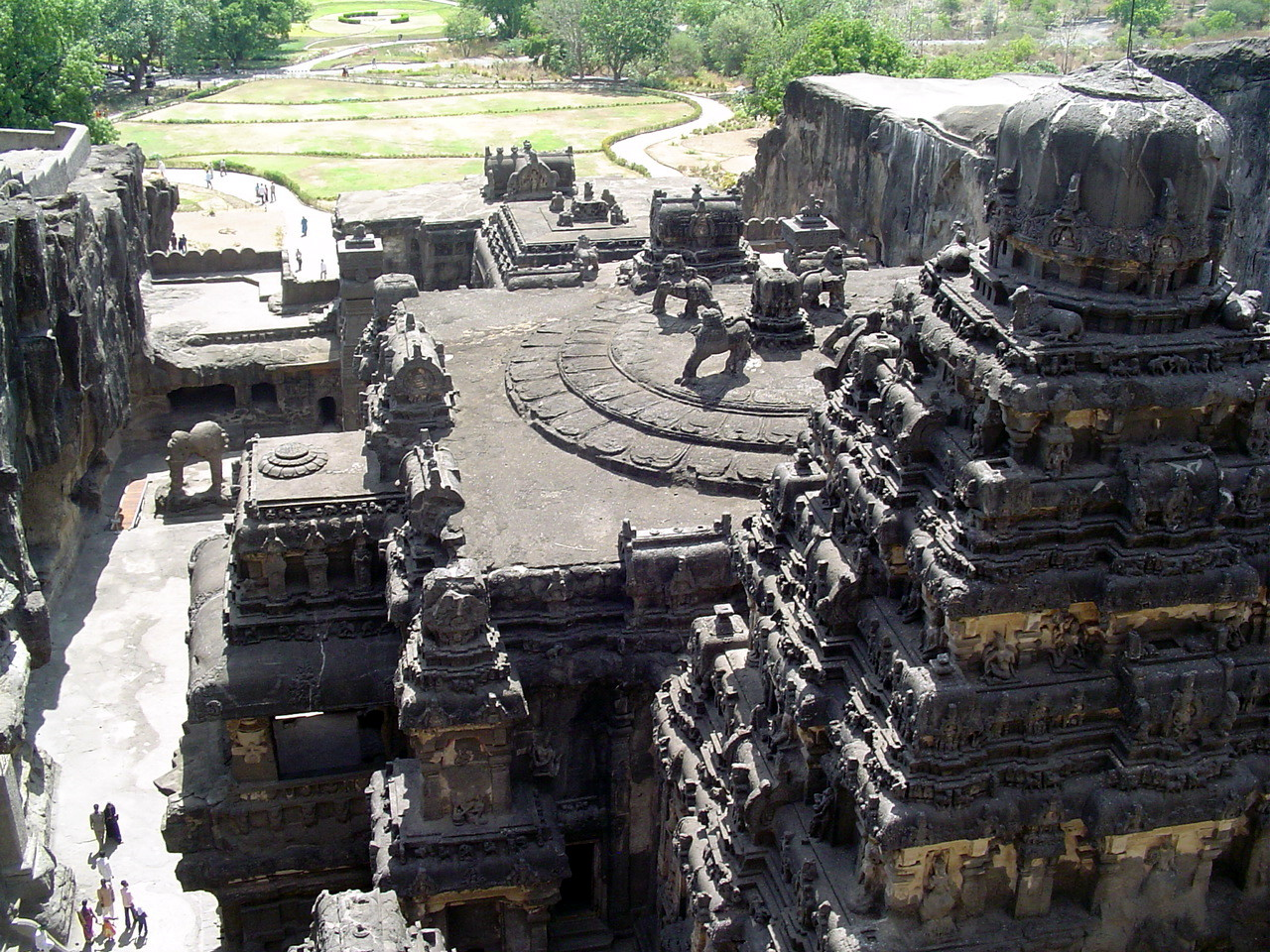
Kailasa temple, Ellora, Aurangabad

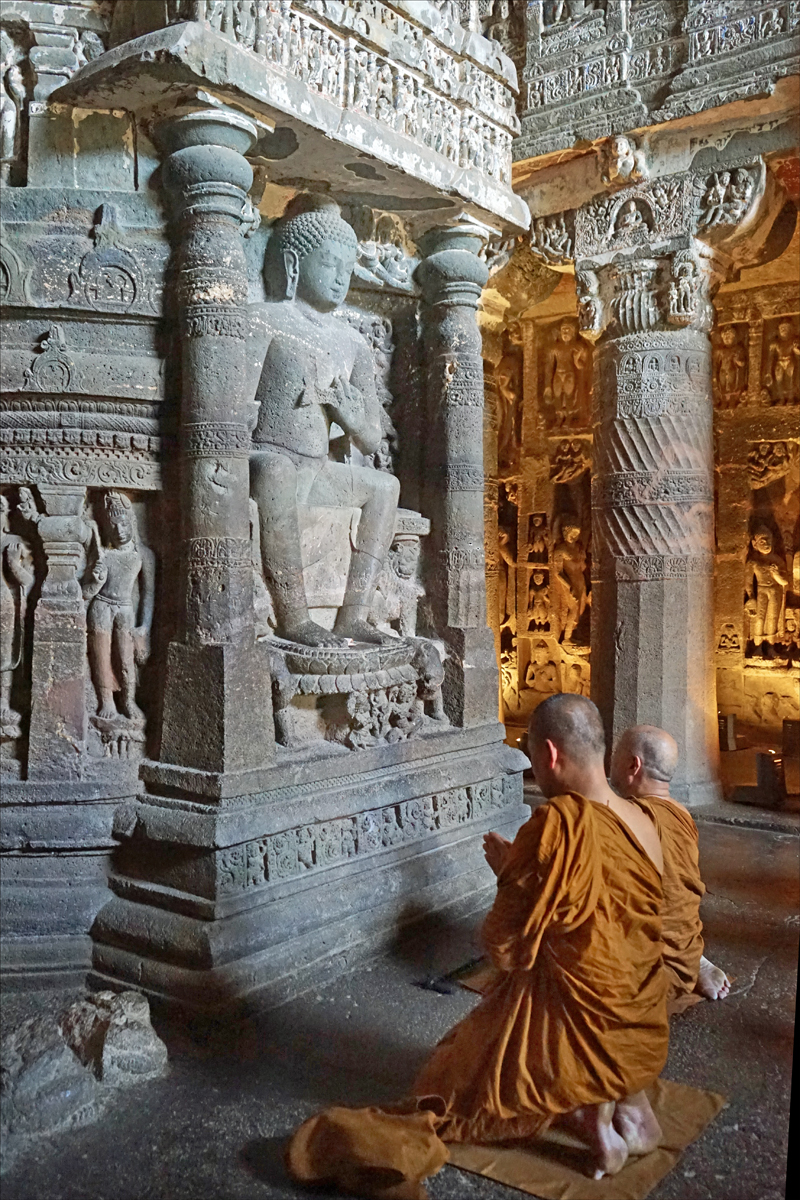
Buddhist monks praying in front of the Dagoba of Chaitya in Cave 26 of the Ajanta Caves.

=== Caves ===
- The Ajanta Caves are situated 107 km (66 mi) from Aurangabad city. They comprise 30 rock-cut caves around a gorge and were built by the Satavahana, Vakataka and Chalukya dynasties between the 2nd and 5th centuries CE. They contain various works of ancient Indian art, including paintings which are among the rarest and finest surviving examples of their era. The Ajanta Caves are a UNESCO World Heritage Site.
- The Ellora Caves are 29 km (18 mi) from Aurangabad city. They consist of 34 caves built between the 5th and 10th centuries CE under the patronage of the Rashtrakuta Dynasty. They represent the epitome of Indian rock cut architecture. Like the Ajanta Caves, the Ellora Caves are also a UNESCO World Heritage Site.
- The Aurangabad Caves are 5 km (3 mi) from Aurangabad city. Nestled amidst the hills are 12 Buddhist caves dating back to 3 A.D. Of particular interest are the Tantric influences evident in the iconography and architectural design of the caves.

=== Holy sites ===
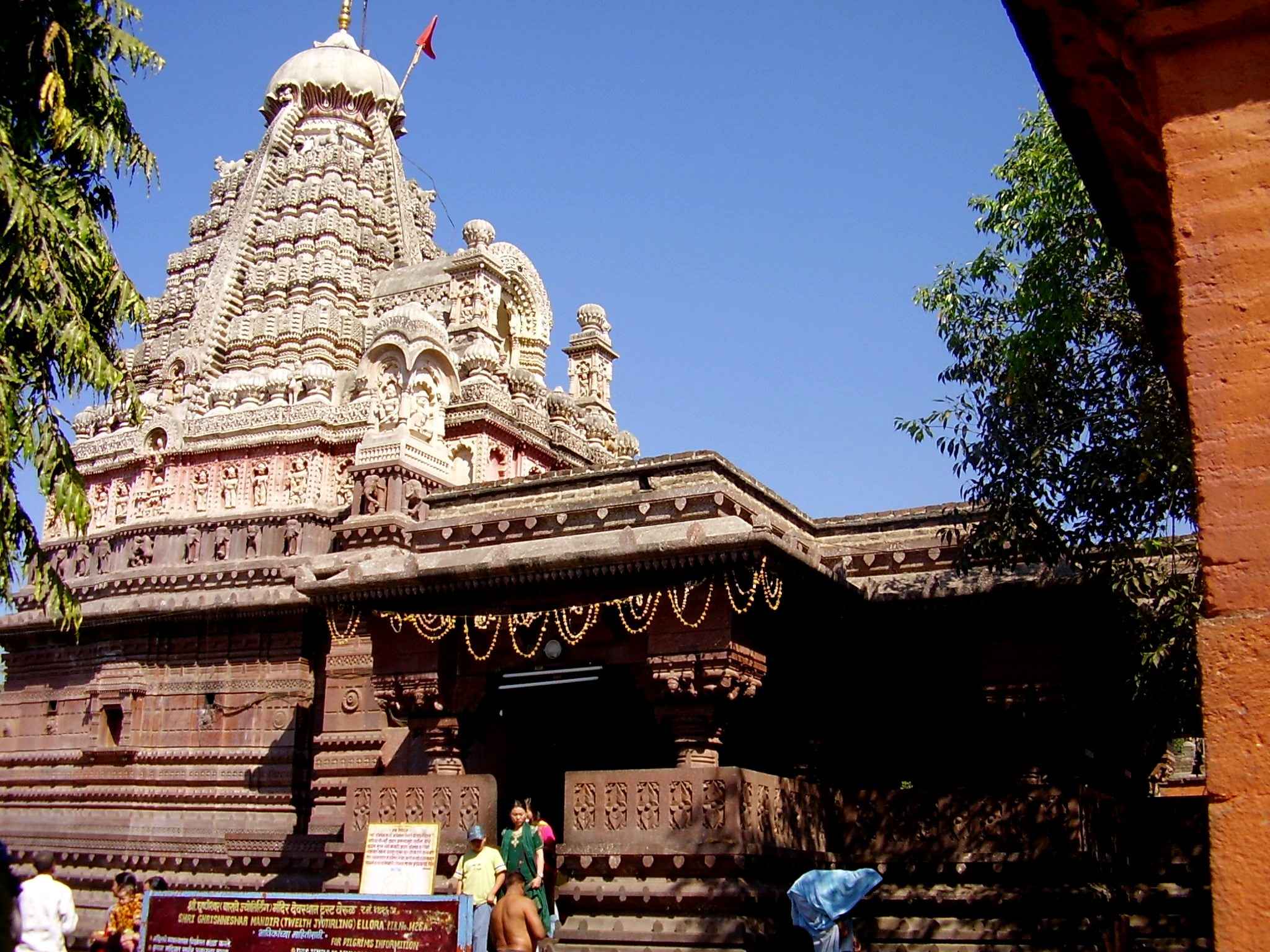
View of Grishneshwar temple

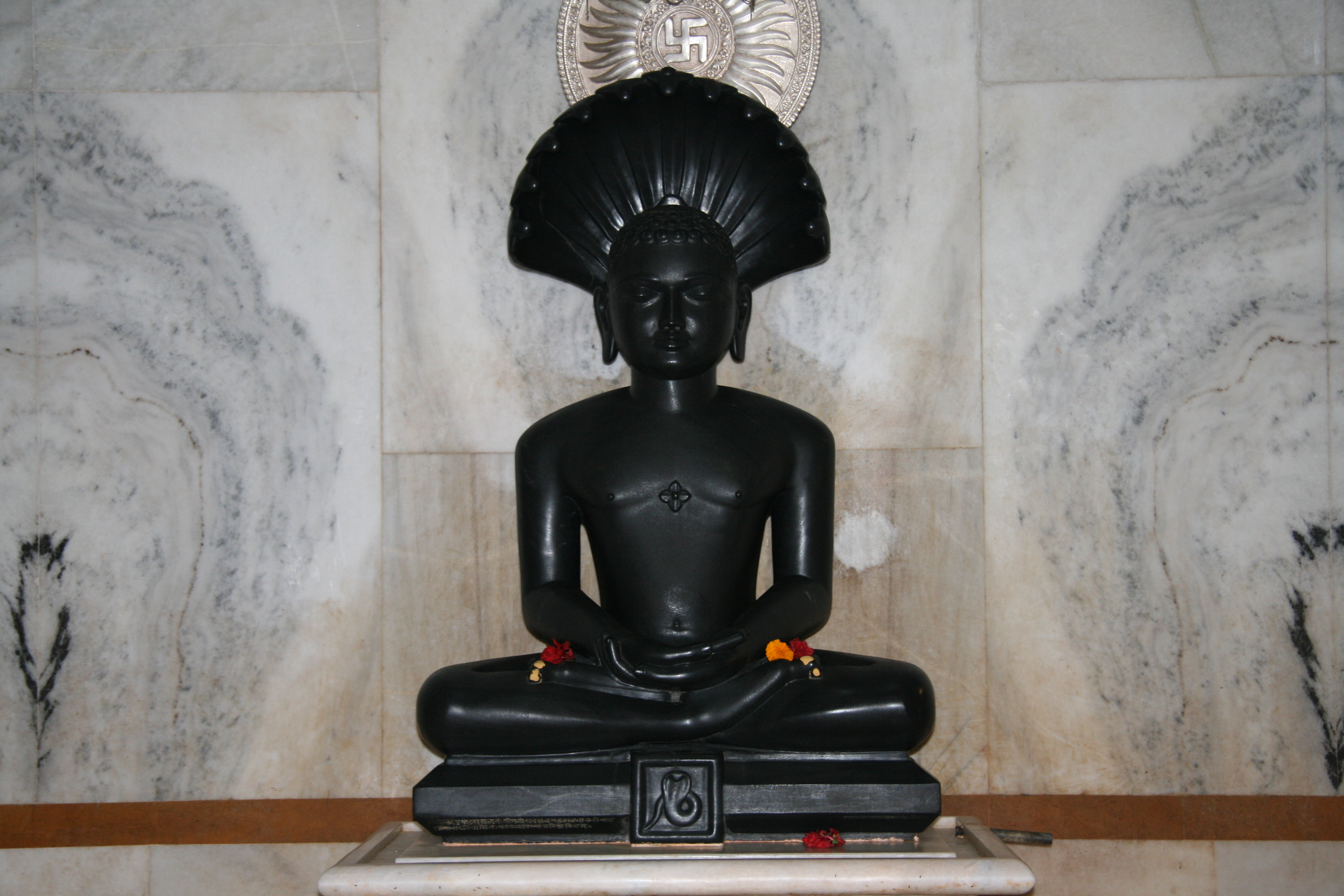
Idol of Parshvanatha at Kachner temple
- Grishneshwar Temple is one of the 12 Jyotirlinga shrines in India. It was built by Ahilyabai Holkar in the 18th century CE. The structure is a unique example of Bhoomija architecture with a Maratha style influence.
- Kachner Jain Temple is a 250 year old Jain center is dedicated to Parshvanatha. It contains an idol called Chintamani Parshvanath.
- Shuli Bhanjan is a hill near Aurangabad. It is believed that Saint Eknath Maharaj carried his Tapasya here.

==== Hindu temples and shrines ====
There are dozens of Hindu temples and shrines in the region.

- Grishneshwar temple
- Kailash temple, Ellora caves, Verul
- Khadakeshwar temple.
- Vitthal Mandir, Pandharpur, A'bad.
- Renukamata mandir, Karnapura. Karnapura Temple.
- Sansthan Ganapati mandir.
- Siddhivinayak mandir.
- Pavan Ganesh mandir.
- Sai Tekadi (Hill).
- Hanuman Tekadi (Hill).
- Khandoba Mandir, Satara.
- Bhadra Maruti Temple, Khuldabad.
- Sant Dnyaneshwar Mandir, Paithan.
- Eknath Maharaj Mandir, Paithan.
- Savata Maharaj Mandir, Vaijapur.
- Mahalakshmi Mandir, Vaijapur.
- Virbhadra Temple, Vaijapur.
- Sant Danshower Maharaj Sansthan.
- Mhasoba Maharaj Mandir, Sillod.
- Sindhi mandir, Sillod.
- Shree Chakradhar Swami Mandir, Gangapur.
- Panchavati Mahadev mandir, Gangapur.
- Ekmukhi Datt Mandir, Gangapur.
- Bhairavnath Mandir, Soegaon.
- Munjoba mandir, Soegaon.
- Mahamuni Agasti Maharaj Warkari Shikshan Sansthan, Soegaon.
- Ram mandir, Kannad.
- Bajarangbali mandir, Kannad.
- Jagrut Siddhivinayak temple, Kannad.

=== Gates and forts ===
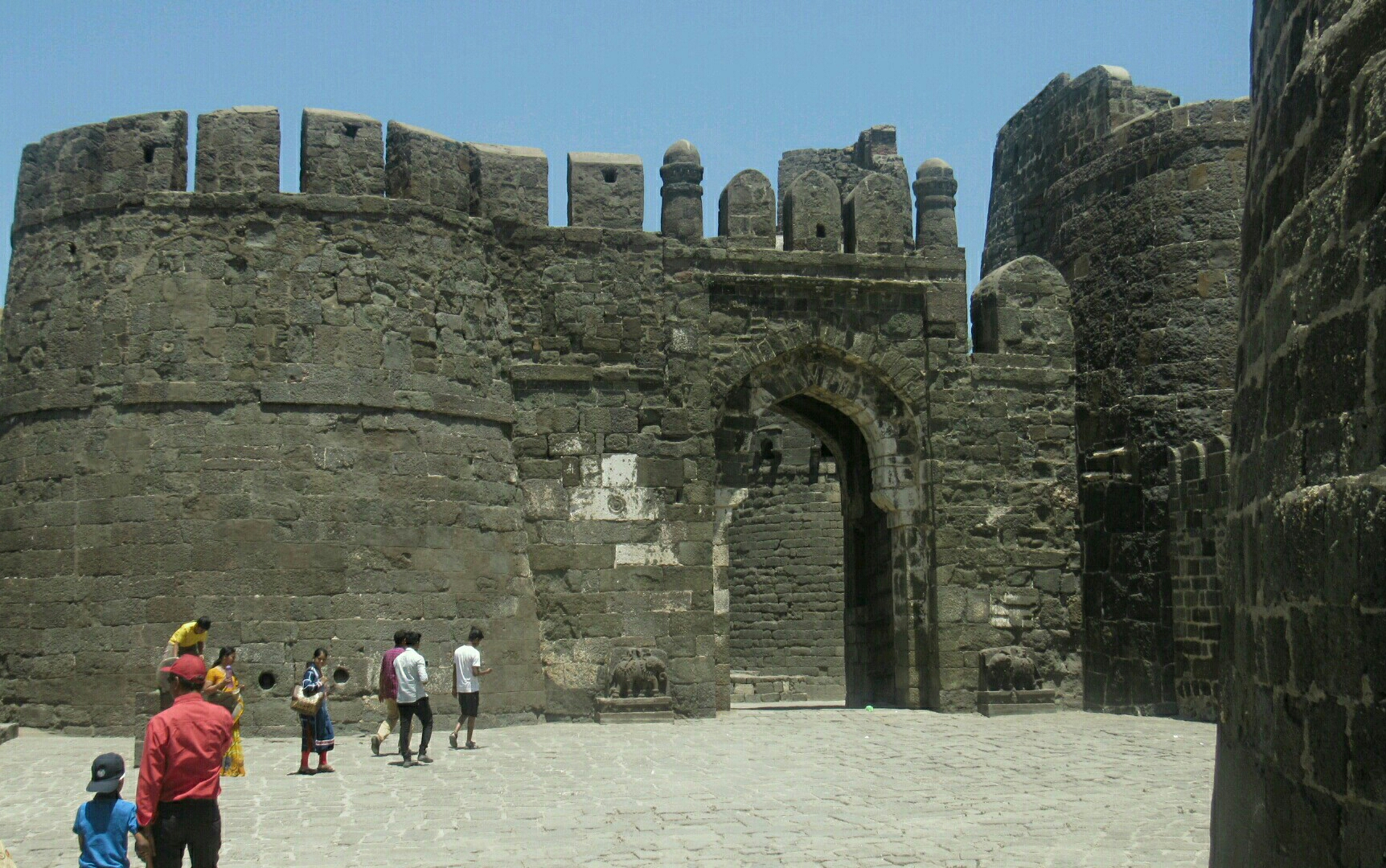
Front view of Daulatabad Fort

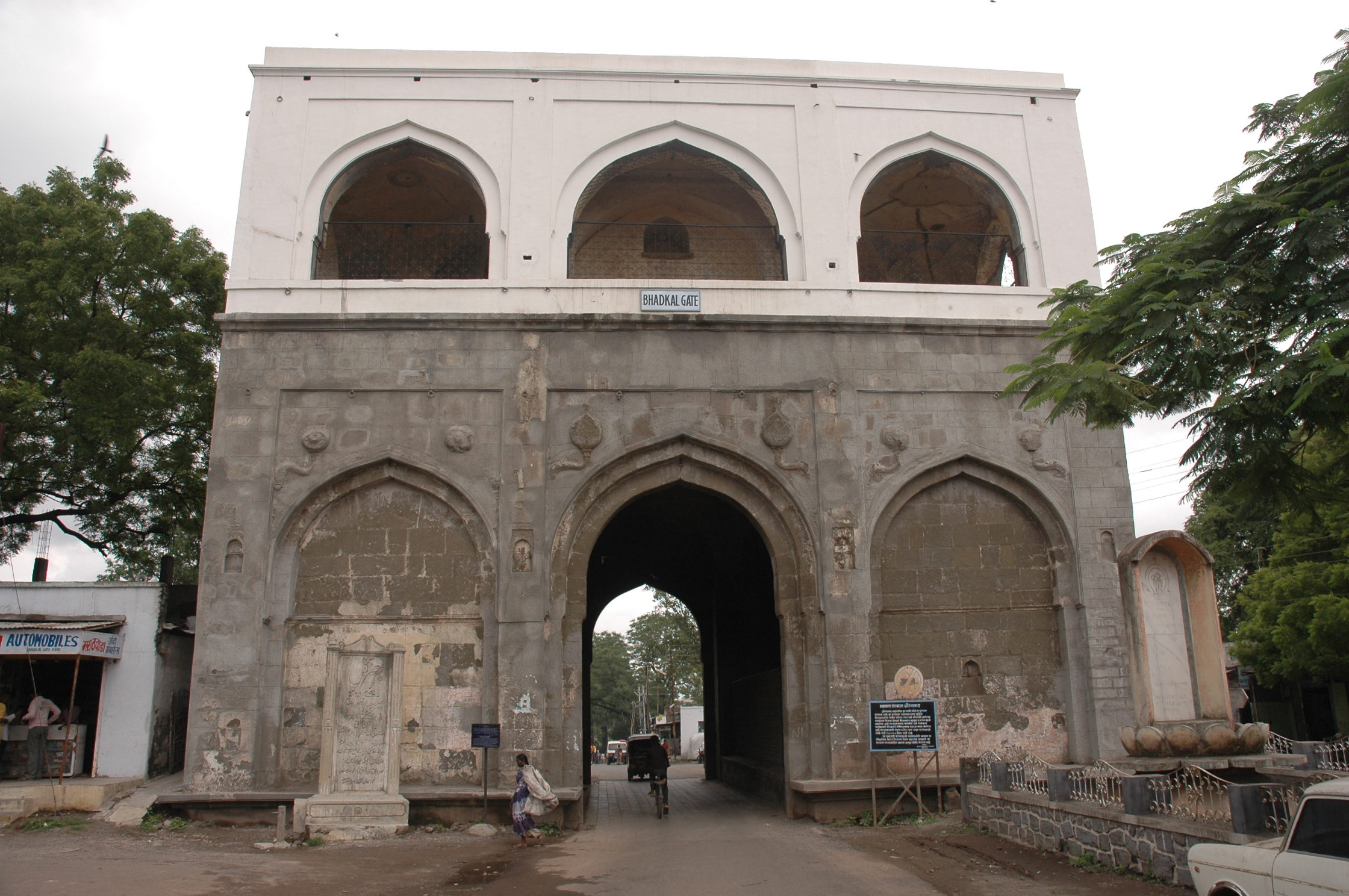
Bhadkal Gate

The city of Aurangabad is known for its 52 gates and has been called the "City of Gates". These gates were built during Mughal era.

Daulatabad Fort (aka Devagiri Fort), located some 15 km (9 mi) north-west of Aurangabad, was built in the 12th century CE by the Yadava Dynasty. It was one of the most powerful forts during the medieval era. The fort was built on a 200-metre-high (660 ft) conical hill and defended by moats, trenches, and three encircling walls with bastions. It also had two fixed massive canons which could be pivoted. The fort was never conquered by any military force.

=== Mughal architecture ===
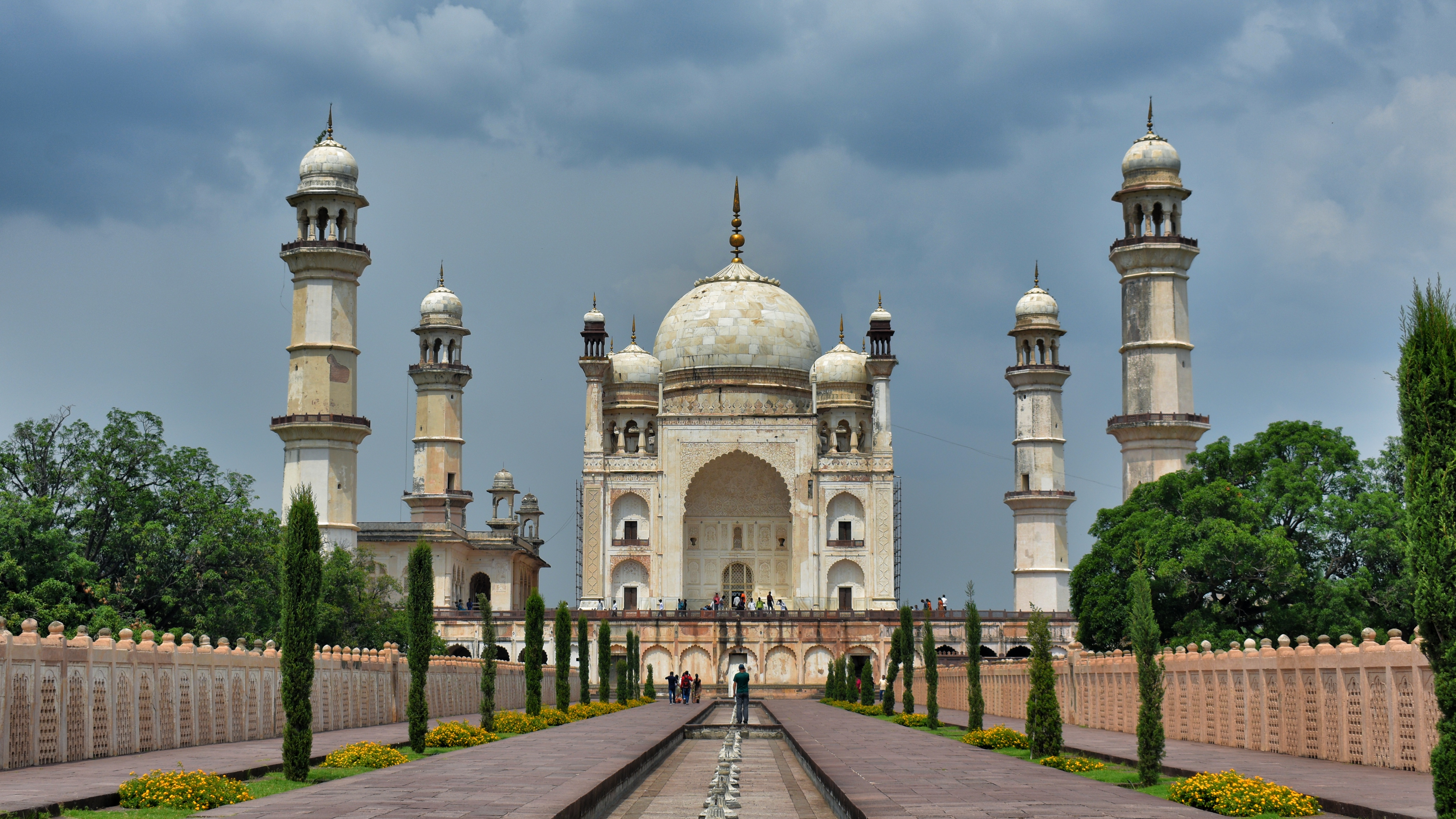
Bibi Ka Maqbara

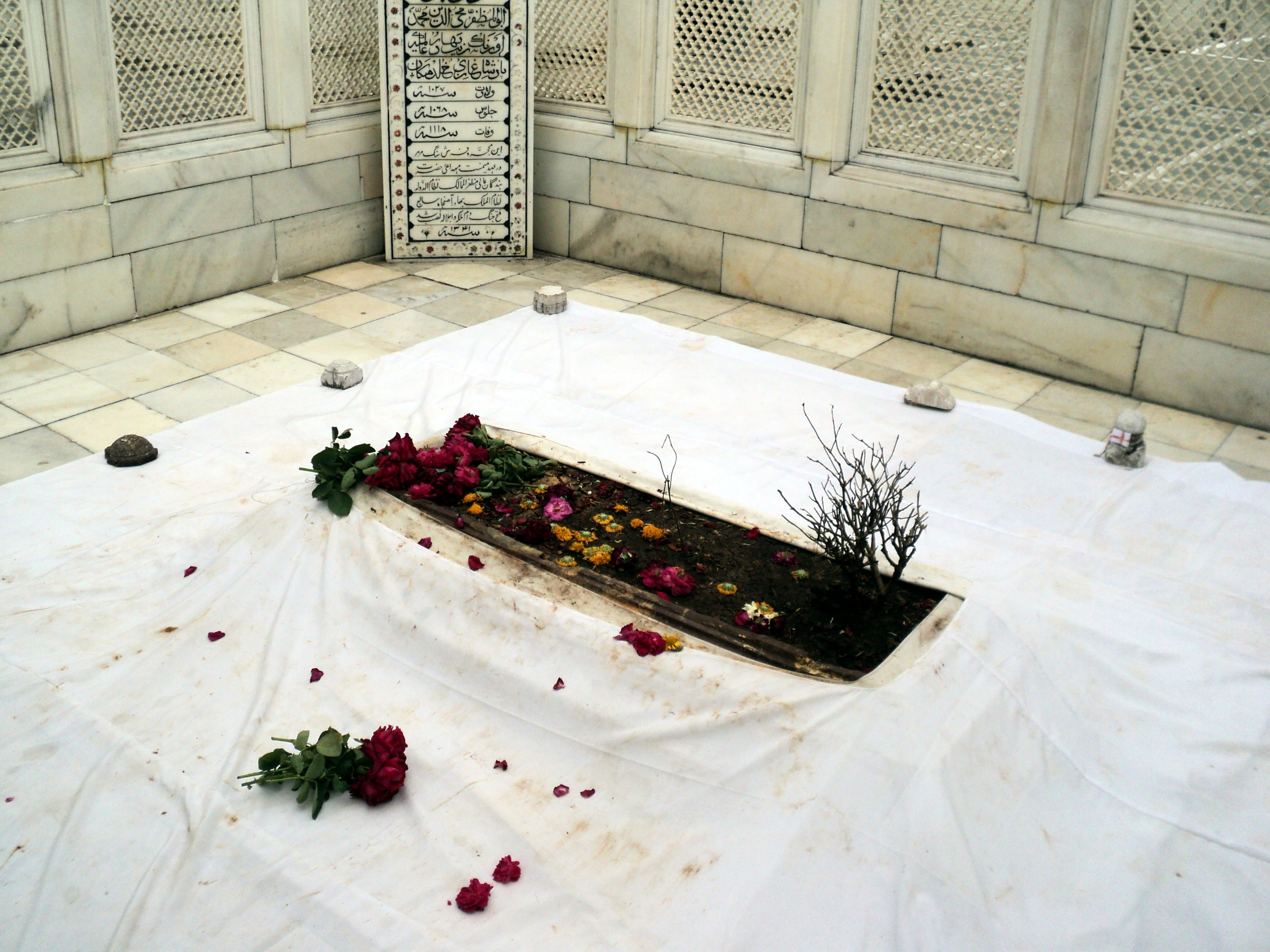
Tomb of Aurangzeb
- The Bibi Ka Maqbara is the burial mausoleum of Emperor Aurangzeb's wife, Dilras Banu Begum (posthumously known as Rabia-ud-Daurani). The site is 3 km (2 mi) from Aurangabad city. It is an imitation of the Taj Mahal at Agra and is popularly known as the "Taj of the Deccan".
- The Tomb of Aurangzeb is located in the village of Khuldabad, 24 km (15 mi) to the north-west of Aurangabad city, in the south-eastern corner of the complex of the dargah of Sheikh Zainuddin. Aurangzeb is considered to have been last great Mughal emperor.

=== Other notable sites ===
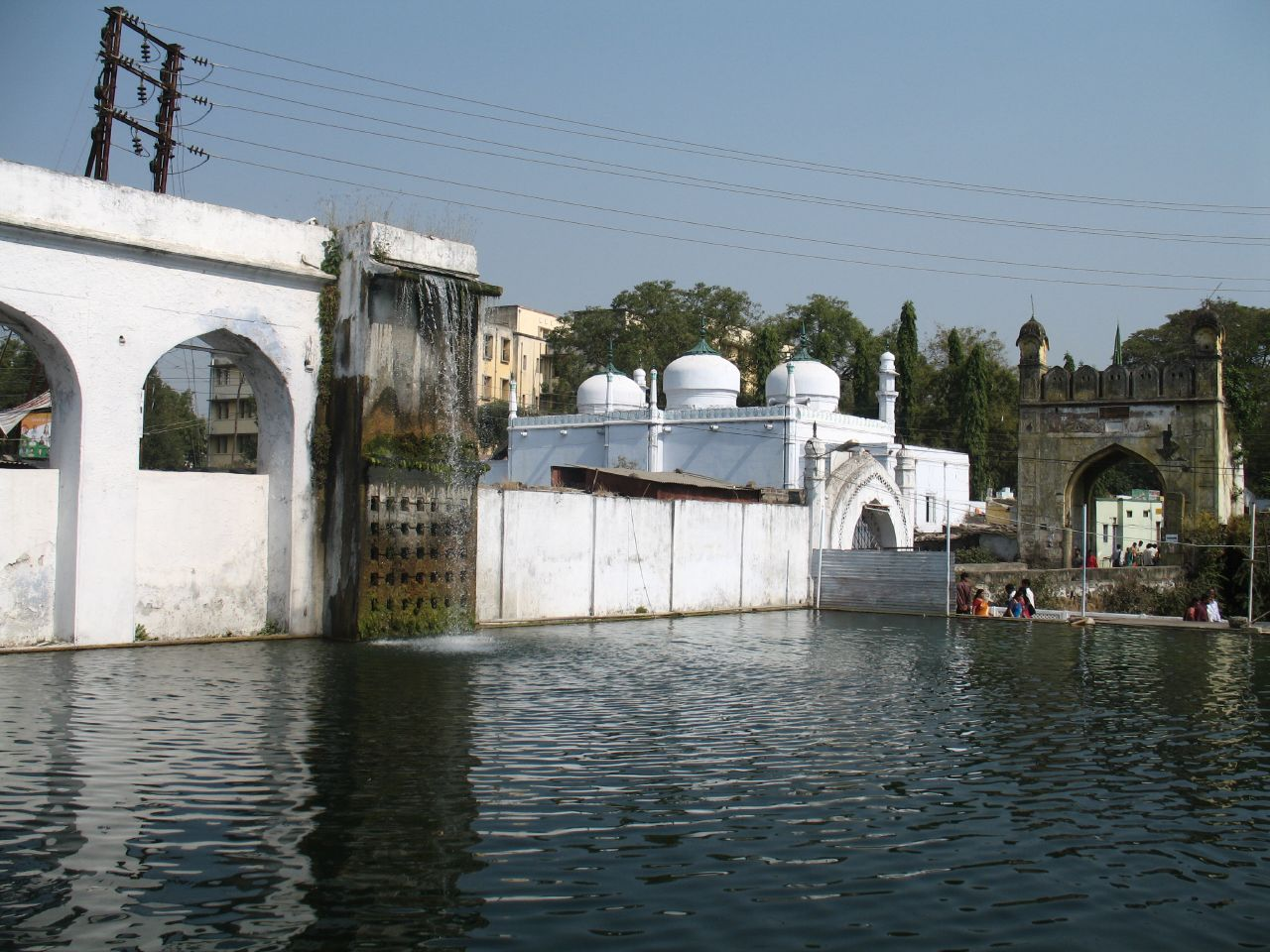
Panchakki was designed to generate energy from water flowing down a mountain. It displays the scientific thought process that guided medieval Indian architecture.

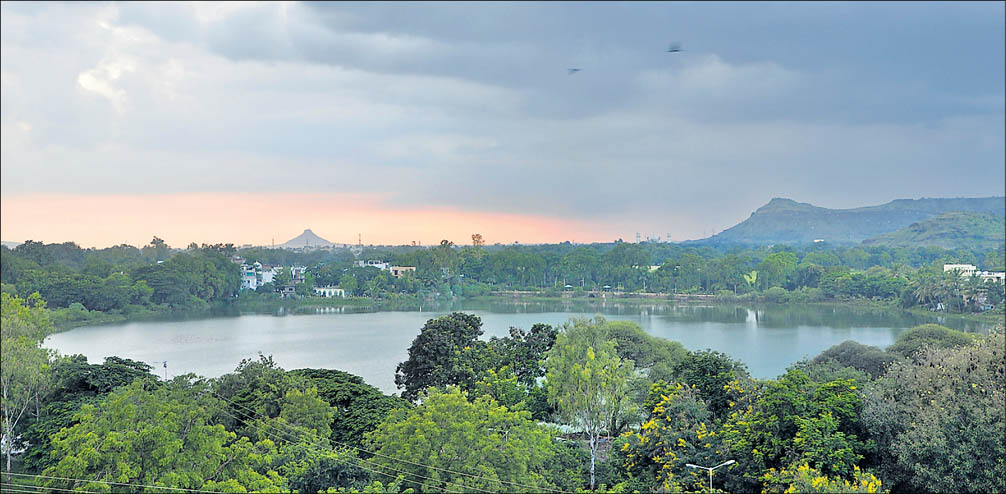
Salim Ali Lake

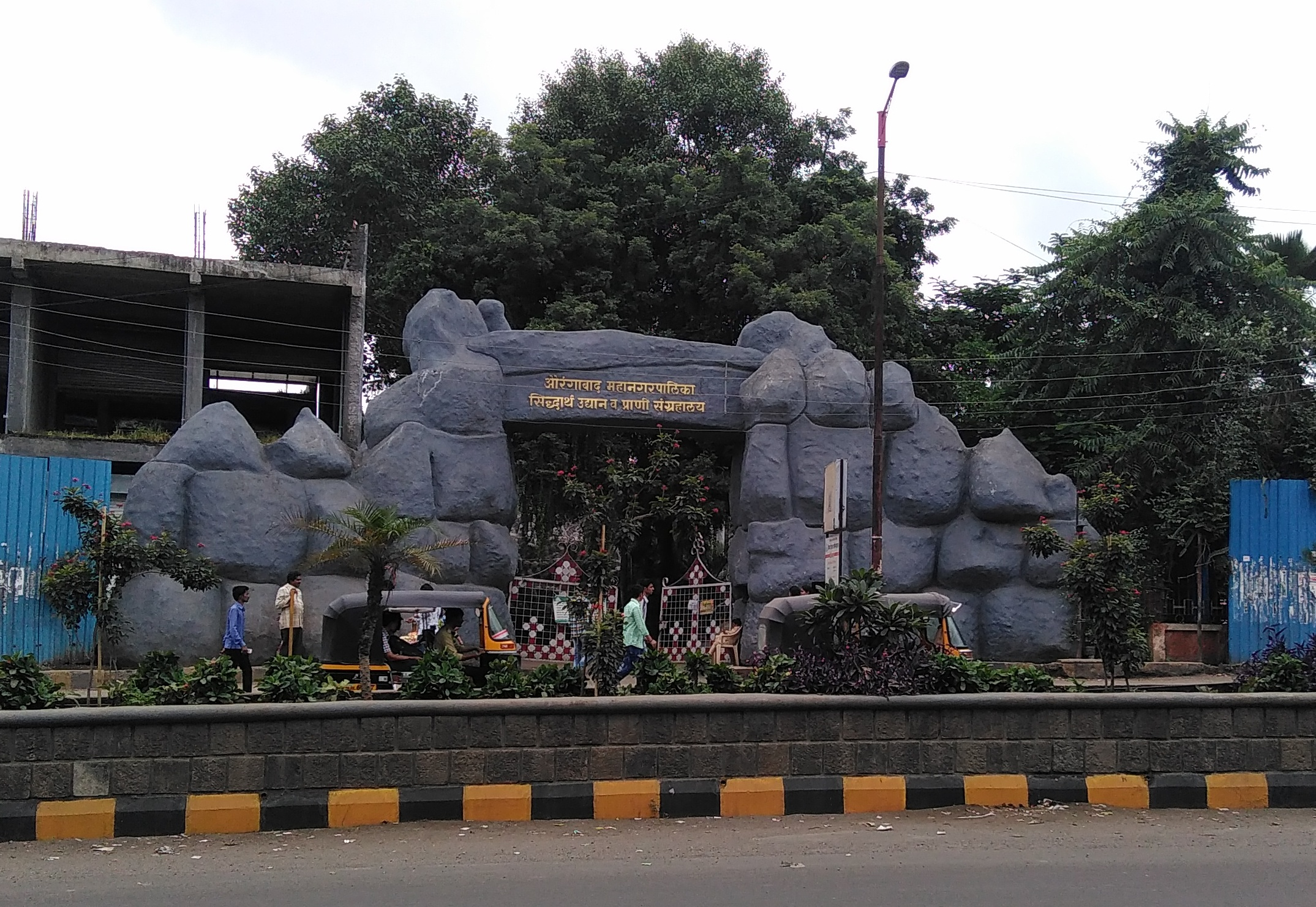
Siddharth Garden near a bus stand in Aurangabad
- Panchakki, which literally means "water mill", is a 17th-century water mill situated within the old city of Aurangabad. It is known for its underground channel, which carries water from hills over 8 km away. The channel culminates in an artificial waterfall that powers the mill.
- Salim Ali Lake & Bird Sanctuary is located in the northern part of the city near Delhi Darwaza, opposite Himayat Bagh. During the Mughal period, it was known as Khiziri Talab. It was renamed after the great ornithologist and naturalist Salim Ali. It features a bird sanctuary and a garden maintained by the Aurangabad Municipal Corporation.
- Siddharth Garden and Zoo is situated near the central bus station in Aurangabad city. It is the only zoo in the Marathwada region. It is home to several species of animals, birds, flowers, and trees. The name "Siddhartha" is a reference to Gautama Buddha.
- The Gautala Autramghat Wildlife Sanctuary is a protected area of Maharashtra state, India. It lies in the Satmala and Ajantha hill ranges of the Western Ghats, and administratively is in kannad taluka of Aurangabad District. The wildlife sanctuary was established in 1986 in an existing reserved forest area

== Transportation ==
=== Road ===
- Mumbai – Aurangabad
- Hyderabad – Aurangabad
- Nagpur – Aurangabad
- Dhule – Aurangabad
- Pune – Aurangabad (approximately 4.5 hours journey time)
- Solapur – Aurangabad

=== Rail ===
The Manmad-Kachiguda Railway Station Broad gauge railway line emanates from the Mumbai-Bhusawal-Howrah trunk route at Manmad and is an important traffic artery in Aurangabad District. Routes include:

- Mumbai – Aurangabad
- Hyderabad – Nanded – Aurangabad
- Secunderabad – Bangalore – Parbhani – Aurangabad
- Delhi – Aurangabad – Delhi
- Nagpur – Aurangabad – Nagpur
- Mumbai-Aurangabad – Mumbai – Janshatabdi Express (daily service)
- Nandigram Express – via – Aurangabad to Mumbai (daily service)
- Devgiri Express – via – Aurangabad to Mumbai (daily service)
- Tapovan Express (AWB to NED)(Nanded) or (AWB to CSTM )(Mumbai)(daily service)
- Marathwada Express- (AWB to DAB)(Darmabad) or AWB To MMR(Manmad Jn) (daily service)
- Sachkhand Express- (AWB to NED)(Nanded) or (AWB to ASR) Amritsar JN (daily service)

Aurangabad Airport has flights to Delhi, Mumbai, Hyderabad-Tirupati, Ahmedabad, Bengaluru, Udaipur, and Jaipur.

== See also ==
- Tourism in Marathwada
- Aurangabad Industrial City
