= Koli Bodkha =

Village in Maharashtra

Koli Bodkha is a village in the Aurangabad District of Maharashtra, India. It is located 23.3 km away from Paithan, 78.5 km from Aurangabad, and 294 km from the main state city of Mumbai.
