= Shuli Bhanjan =

Hill in Maharashtra, India

Coordinates: 19°58′39.4″N 75°09′7.4″E

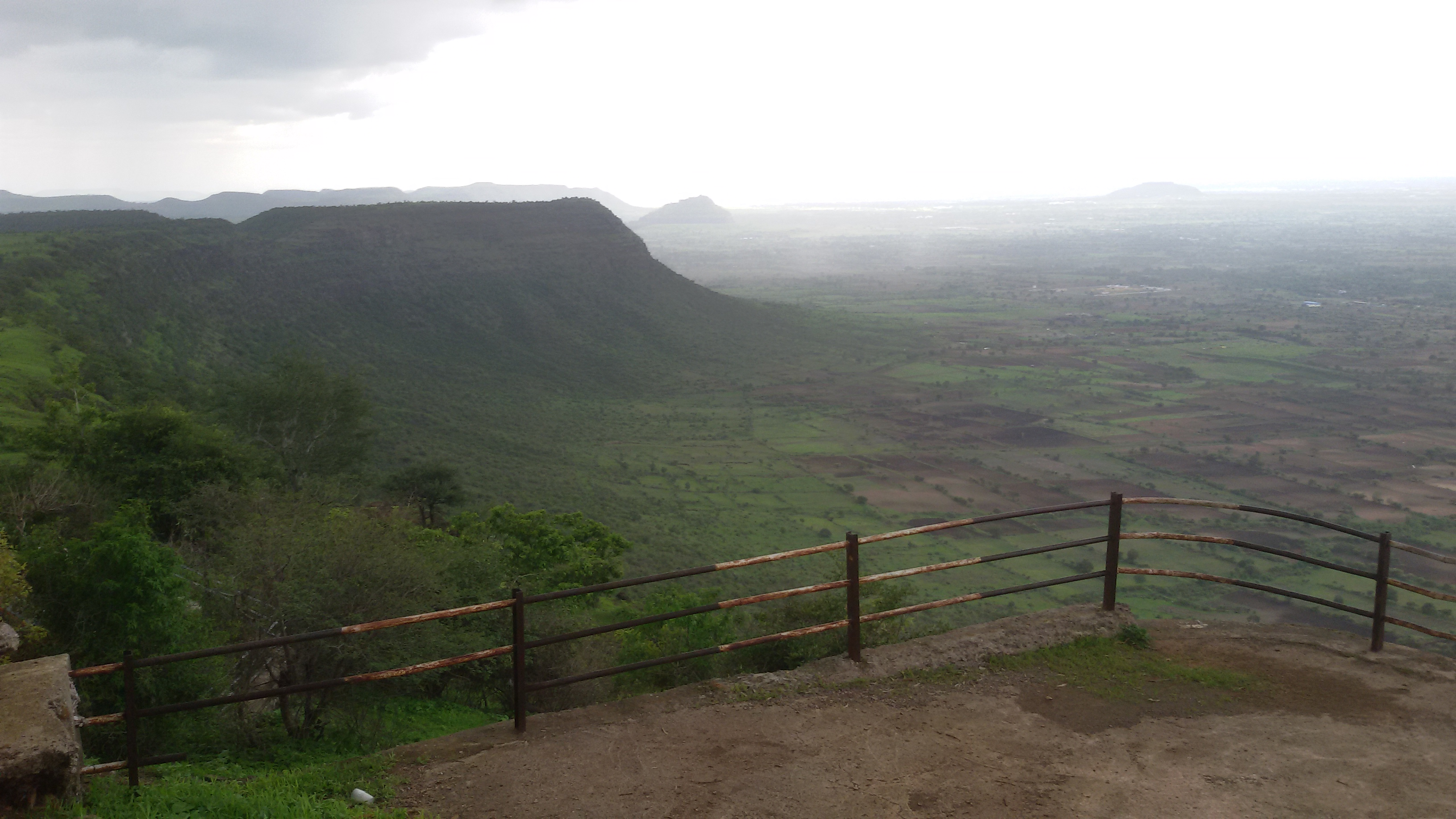
Shuli Bhanjan

Shuli Bhanjan is a hill in the Indian state of Maharashtra located 30 kilometers from Chhatrapati Sambhaji Nagar (previously known as Aurangabad) on the way to UNESCO Ellora Caves which is just seven kilometers away.

This place is situated behind Daulatabad fort as seen from Chhatrapati Sambhaji Nagar in district of Aurangabad and is accessible by road. The height is about 850 meters above sea level.

The 16th-century famous Hindu saint Eknath Maharaj has done penance (tapasya) at this location. He travelled daily on foot from the nearby Daulatabad fort where he had his employment. He is said to have met his spiritual Guru Shri Janardan Swami at Shuli Bhanjan. Saint Eknath Maharaj is said to have received blessings of Dattatreya Swami on the exact location where the Datta Mandir is now located on top of the hill. A stone opposite to temple produces the sound of a metallic bell can be seen outside the temple.The temple has abundant space for caring rituals. A good road is built and ample parking space is available.

It is a revered holy place of Hindus, Buddhism and Jainism. Tourists often visit here experiencing nature and faith.

== Surroundings ==
There are two hot water springs at the top of the hill near the Mandir. A stone which produces sounds of metallic bell is also seen just outside the temple. The place is ideal for Meditation. Mhaismal hill station is also seen at a distance. Aurangabad-Nasik highway is seen at the foot of the hill.

Regional wildlife is in abundant. Peacocks venture on the road side in the mornings and towards the evenings. One can hear the sounds throughout the day.

During rainy season, the cloud and fog gathering is mesmerizing. One can see the clouds forming down below if you are at the view point which is very near the temple. One can find small waterfalls throughout the terrain.

During August–September ( Śarad or Sharad Rutu meaning Autumn season) and March–April ( Vasanta Rutu meaning Spring Season) many people from the neighboring places visit this place. One can notice number of wild flowers blossomed during this season over the mountains & plains as if a carpet has been laid.

Karavanda (Carissa spinarum) also called as ran-mewa meaning forest berries are found in abundance towards end of summer typically May/June. During summer, one can also see flowering Palas (Butea frondosa) trees.

== Pariyon Ka Talab (Aurangabad) ==
On the way to Shuli Bhanjan, one comes across Pariyon Ka Talab (Lake of fairy tale princess). One can spend some time here before starting their climb on to the mountains.

== Miscellaneous ==
Development of this roads and electricity is done by of Mr. Dadasaheb (Pandurang) Ganorkar. He is a local social leader.
