= Sillod =

- city
- Location in Maharashtra, India
- Coordinates: 20.3°N 75.65°E
- Country: India
- State: Maharashtra
- District: Aurangabad
- Elevation: 612 m (2,008 ft)

Population (2011)
  - Total: 58,230

Languages
  - Official: Marathi
- Time zone: UTC+5:30 (IST)
- PIN: 431112
- Vehicle registration: MH-20
- Sex ratio: 936♂/♀
- Website: www.sillod.org

Sillod is a city and a taluka in the Aurangabad district of the Indian state of Maharashtra. Sillod is represented in the Maharashtra Vidhan Sabha through the Sillod Vidhan Sabha constituency. MLA OF SILLOD IS Abdul sattar

== History ==
A village named Shivanitapur once stood on the site of the modern day city. According to some historians, there is a Hemadpanthi style Mahadev Mandir still standing in Mhasoba Colony, the old area of city.

== Demographics ==
Religion in sillod (2011)
1. Islam (47.2%)
2. Hinduism (45.1%)
3. Buddhism (5.54%)
4. Jainism (1.63%)
5. Christianity (0.35%)
6. Sikhism (0.06%)
7. Others (0.07%)
Religion in sillod Taluka (2011)
1. Hinduism (69.1%)
2. Islam (25.6%)
3. Buddhism (4.74%)
4. Jainism (0.39%)
5. Christianity (0.01%)
6. Sikhism (0.03%)
7. Others (0.07%)

=== Population ===
As of the 2011 Indian census, Sillod had a population of 58230, of which 51.64 per cent were male and 48.35 per cent female. The city has an average literacy rate of 83.32per cent, higher than the state average of 82.34% with a male literacy rate of 89.74 per cent and that for females 76.47 per cent fifteen per cent of Sillod's population is under six years of age.

== Government ==
Sillod is the Municipal council in district of chhatrapati sambhaji nagar, Maharashtra. In 2019, Rajashri Nikam of Shiv Sena became the Mayor of Sillod.

Sillod Municipal Results (2019):

| S.No. | Party name | Party flag or symbol | No. of Corporators |
|---|---|---|---|
| 01 | Shiv Sena (SS) | | 24 |
| 02 | Bharatiya Janata Party (BJP) | | 02 |
| 03 | Indian National Congress (INC) | | 00 |
| 04 | Nationalist Congress Party (NCP) | | 00 |
| 05 | Bahujan Samaj Party | | 00 |
| 08 | Independent | | 00 |

=== Judicial ===
The city is the seat of the Aurangabad district Court, situated on Main Road. There are also Tehsil and Sessions Court as well as many other courts of Law.

== Economy ==
Sillod Taluka is situated next to four major districts: Jalgoan in the north (94 km), Aurangabad in the south-west (65 km), Jalna in the south-east (67 km) and Buldhana in the north-east (72 km). It has one of the largest market in the Aurangabad district. It has big precious metal (gold/silver) market in main market called Sarafa market.

The tehsil (administrative district) ranks number one in the production of maize. As well as corn and maize, Sillod is also a leading producer of cotton and ginger. The cultivation of major crops has changed over the last decade due to changes in the water landscape of the area. Prior to these changes the major crops were sugarcane, jowar, bajara (green millet) and cotton with very little cultivation of Ginger. Food processing facilities include the Siddheshwar Sahakari Sakhar Karkhana (sugar factory), as well as ginning and oil mills.

The villages of Andhari, Palashi, Bharadi, Shivna, Ajantha, Ambhai, Golegoan, and Borgaon Bazar have had a major impact on shaping the economic prospects of Sillod tehsil,Andhari is one of the developed village in tehsil.

Sillod has branches of major nationalized banks including State Bank of India, State Bank of Hyderabad, Bank of Maharashtra, Central Bank of India and Bank of India.

== Tourism and culture ==
Sillod lies 40 kilometres (25 mi) from the Ajanta Caves, a UNESCO World Heritage Site popular for its paintings of ancient India.

In old city, at Mhasoba galli popular temple of Mhasoba Maharaj deity. An annual fair is (Jatra) is held in sillod city. The Durga Mata Temple is located just behind the Mhasoba Temple on Kerhala road.

=== Shivaji Maharaj Statue ===
Sillod is the only place where you can find a statue of Chhatrapati Shivaji Maharaj, built in front of the Jama Masjid. The statue was built by the late Digambar Shankar Prashad between the 1970s and 2000s and stands as a symbol of unity.

Jama Masjid Sillod Is One Of the Biggest Masjid In Chhatrapati Sambhajinagar district, and was rebuilt in 2000.

Many surrounding villages have notable temples. A Hemadpanthi Nilkantheshwar Mandir is located in Nillod village. A temple dedicated to Hindu mystic Siddheshwar Maharaj is situated in Dhotra. Murdeshwar is one of the popular pilgrimage centre with a Mahadev temple near the Kelana River.This temple is located about 88 km northerly to Chhatrapati Sambhajinagar, 35km north-westerly to Sillod town, 50km westerly to the famous Ajanta caves. Village of Borgaon Bazar is the Samadhi site of Swami Narayan Saraswati Maharaja. Lonwadi, situated at 30 km westerly from Sillod, is known for the Amba Bhavani Mata temple. There is also the temple of Sant Surajgir Maharaj, who is the Guru of Kadhigiri Maharaj of Murdeshwar. Mandna is known for the Chandika Mata temple.

== See also ==
- Sillod Municipal Council
- Sillod Vidhan Sabha Constituency
