= Soyagaon =

- Town and Taluka
- Location in Maharashtra, India
- Coordinates: 20.551389°N 74.507222°E
- Country: India
- State: Maharashtra
- District: Nashik
- Taluka: soygaon

Government
  - Type: corporation
  - Body: Malegaon municipal corporation

Population (2011)
  - Total: 48,000

Languages
  - Official: Marathi
- Time zone: UTC+5:30 (IST)
- PIN: 423203,423105
- Vehicle registration: MH41

Soyagaon or soegaon is a Town and Taluka in Nashik District in the Indian state of Maharashtra.

== Demographics ==
In the 2001 India census, Soyagaon had a population of 21,819. Males constituted 52% of the population and females 48%. Soyagaon had an average literacy rate of 81%, higher than the national average of 59.5%: male literacy was 85%, and female literacy was 76%. In 2001 in Soyagaon, 12% of the population was under 6 years of age.
