= Gangapur, Maharashtra =

Gangapur
- Town
- Location in Maharashtra, India
- Coordinates: 19.6991°N 75.0086°E
- Country: India
- State: Maharashtra
- District: Aurangabad

Government
  - Body: Municipal Council
  - President (नगराध्यक्ष): <संजय विठ्ठलराव जाधव >
- Elevation: 572 m (1,877 ft)

Population (2001)
  - Total: 25,053

Languages
  - Official: Marathi
- Time zone: UTC+5:30 (IST)
- Postal code: 431109
- ISO 3166 code: IN-MH
- Vehicle registration: MH-20
- Website: maharashtra.gov.in

Gangapur is a town and a municipal council in Aurangabad district in the state of Maharashtra, India.

== Geography ==
Gangapur is located about 38 km from Aurangabad on the Aurangabad–Ahmednagar Highway. It serves as a taluka headquarters.

The town is known for several temples including:

- Narasimha Temple
- Vitthal Mandir
- Ek Mukhi Datta Temple
- Rameshwar Temple
- Mukteshwar Temple
- Jagdamba Devi Temple (Jamgaon)

Gangapur Sugar Factory is located in Jamgaon, which lies near the backwaters of Jayakwadi Dam, making much of the surrounding land irrigated.

The town has an average elevation of 572 metres (1876 feet).

== Demographics ==
As per the 2011 Census, Gangapur had a population of 41,067. Males constitute 52% and females 48%.

The average literacy rate is 71.2%, higher than the national average:

- Male literacy: 74%
- Female literacy: 59%

About 15% of the population is under 6 years of age.

== Religion ==
=== Town ===
- Hinduism – 61.42%
- Islam – 30.01%
- Buddhism – 16.5%
- Jainism – 1.02%
- Christianity – 0.37%
- Sikhism – 0.04%

=== Taluka ===
- Hinduism – 75.61%
- Islam – 15.07%
- Buddhism – 8.16%
- Jainism – 0.57%
- Christianity – 0.23%
- Sikhism – 0.04%

== Education ==
Gangapur has several schools and colleges, including:

- St. Mary's High School, Wahegaon (run by St. Francis Education Society, Aurangabad)
- Shri Muktanand Mahavidyalaya – offering Arts, Commerce, and Science streams, reaccredited with an "A+" grade by NAAC
