= Tourism in Marathwada =

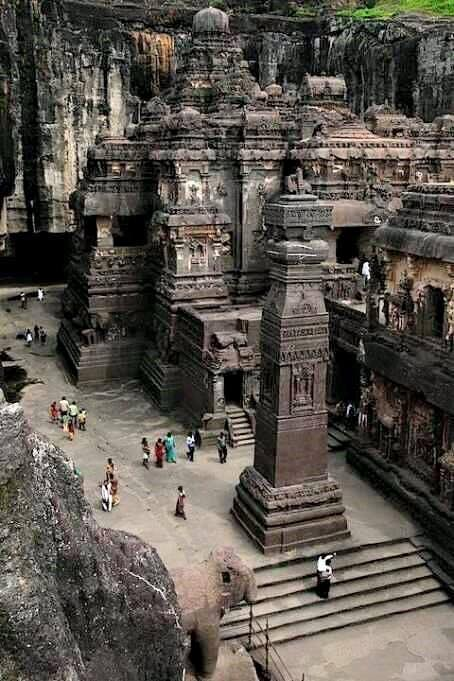
Kailashanatha Temple in Ellora Caves

Tourism in Marathwada refers to tourism in the Marathwada region of Maharashtra state in India. Chatrapati Sambhaji Nagar is a regional headquarters in Marathwada, and the tourism capital of Maharashtra state. Out of the four UNESCO World Heritage Sites in Maharashtra, two are in the Marathwada region. There are also 110 monuments in Marathwada, which are protected by Government of Maharashtra and recognized by Archaeological Survey of India.

Marathwada is also an important region for religious tourism; 3 of the 12 Hindu Jyotirlinga temples mentioned in the Shiva Purana are in Marathwada. Hazur Sahib Nanded is the second holiest place in Sikhism after the Harminder Sahib (Golden Temple) in Amritsar. There are also Sufi shrines in Marathwada, the most famous among them being the Turabul Haq Dargah at Parbhani, where thousands of people of all religions visit the dargah annually. Pathri in Parbhani district is the birthplace of Sai Baba of Shirdi, and the Sai Baba Birth Temple is one of the major religious tourism places in Marathwada.

== Caves ==
The Marathwada region is home to a number of man-made cave temples, monuments, and historic sites.

- Pitalkhora Caves – these colorful Buddhist caves are 17 km (11 mi) from Kannad Town. They were carved in the first century and is the first cave in Asia.
- Rohilagad Caves – Rohilagad is 44 km (27 mi) from Aurangabad and 45 km (28 mi) from Jalna. These three caves date back to Satvahan yug, and many artworks were added to Rohilagad samrajya. The sculptures of Rohilagad are considered masterpieces of Hindu religious art.
- Ajanta Caves – a UNESCO World Heritage Sites that dates back to the 2nd and 1st centuries BC. During the Gupta period (5th and 6th centuries AD), many more richly decorated caves were added to the original group. The paintings and sculptures of Ajanta are considered masterpieces of Buddhist religious art.
- Ellora Caves – a UNESCO World Heritage Sites that dates back to 600–1000 AD. Its sanctuaries are devoted to Buddhism, Hinduism, and Jainism. According to UNESCO, "it illustrates the spirit of tolerance that was characteristic of ancient India".
- Aurangabad Caves – twelve 3rd-century Buddhist caves on the campus of Dr. Babasaheb Ambedkar Marathwada University, Aurangabad.
- Ghatotkacha Cave (Aurangabad)
- Rudreshwar Caves (Aurangabad district)
- Kharosa Caves (Latur district)
- Shivleni Caves (Ambajogai, Beed district)
- Bhokardan Caves (Bhokardan, Jalna district)
- Pandava Caves (Nanded district)
- Brahmani Caves (Nanded district)
- Dharashiv Caves – this nexus of seven caves is located 8 km (5.0 mi) away from Osmanabad in the Balaghat Mountains. The caves were noted by Archaeological Department of India and mentioned in the book Archaeological Survey of India by James Burges. Dharashiv Caves have been declared a protected area by Government of Maharashtra.
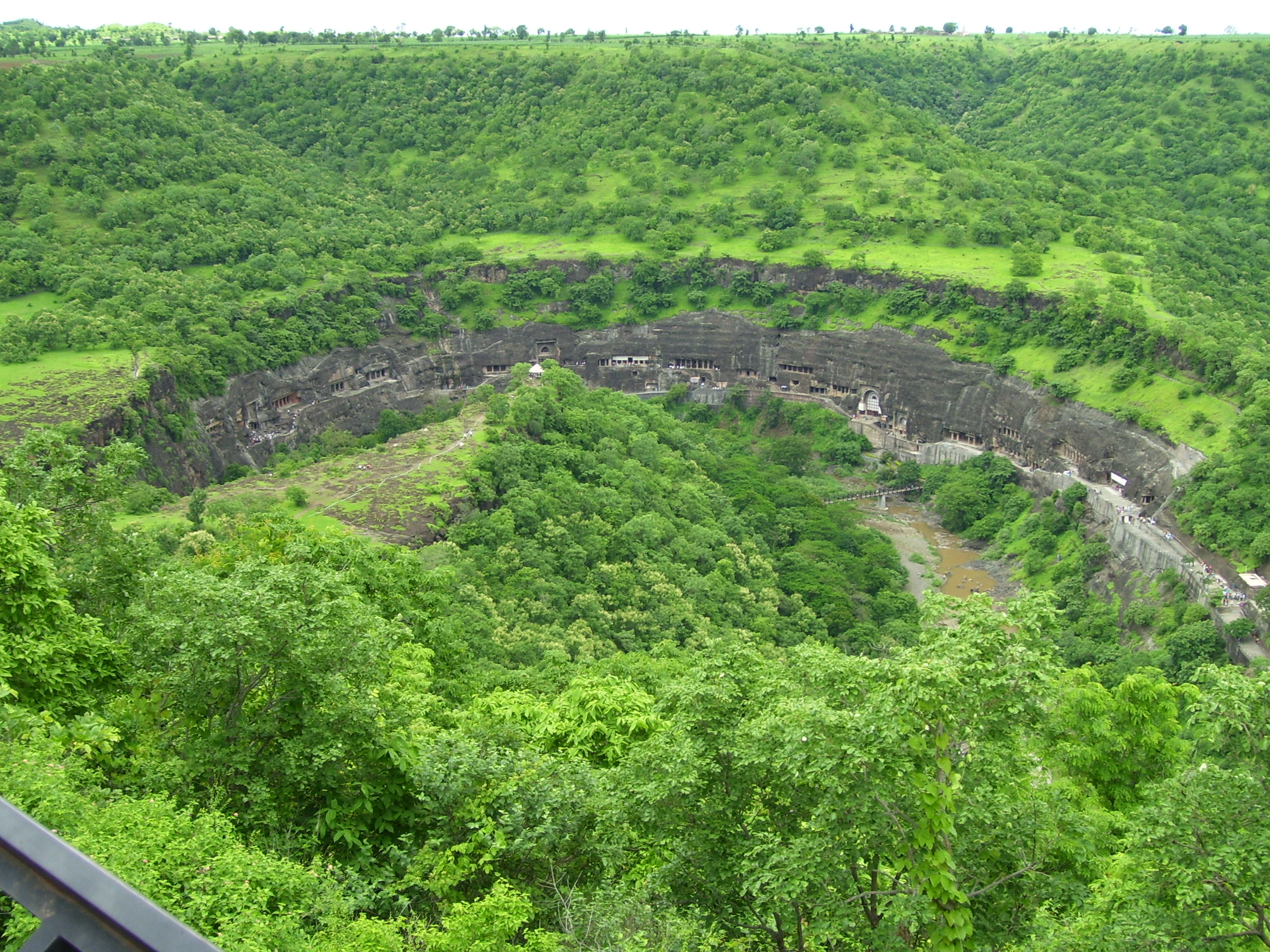
Ajanta Caves view from nearby hill

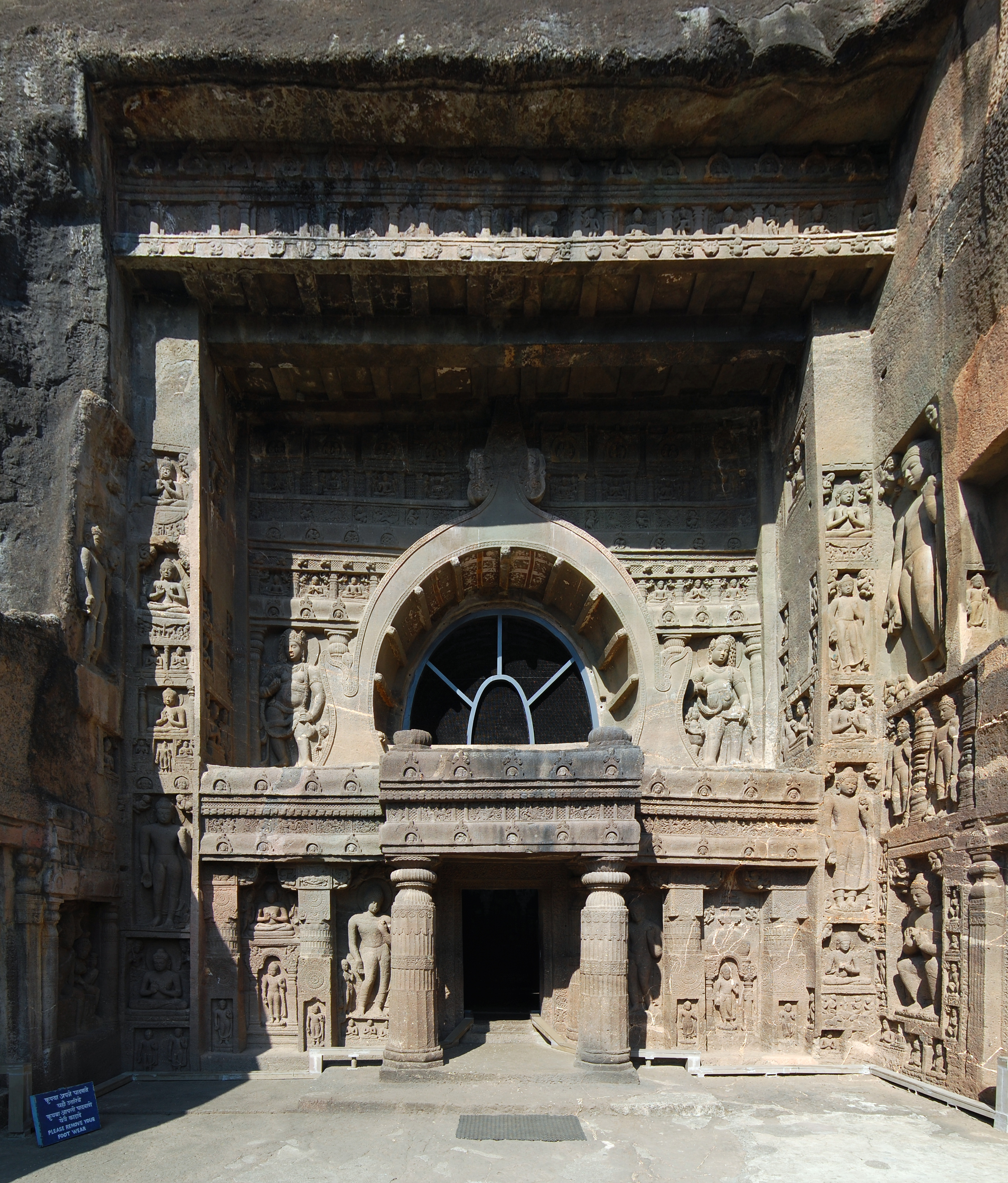
Entrance of Cave 19, Ajanta

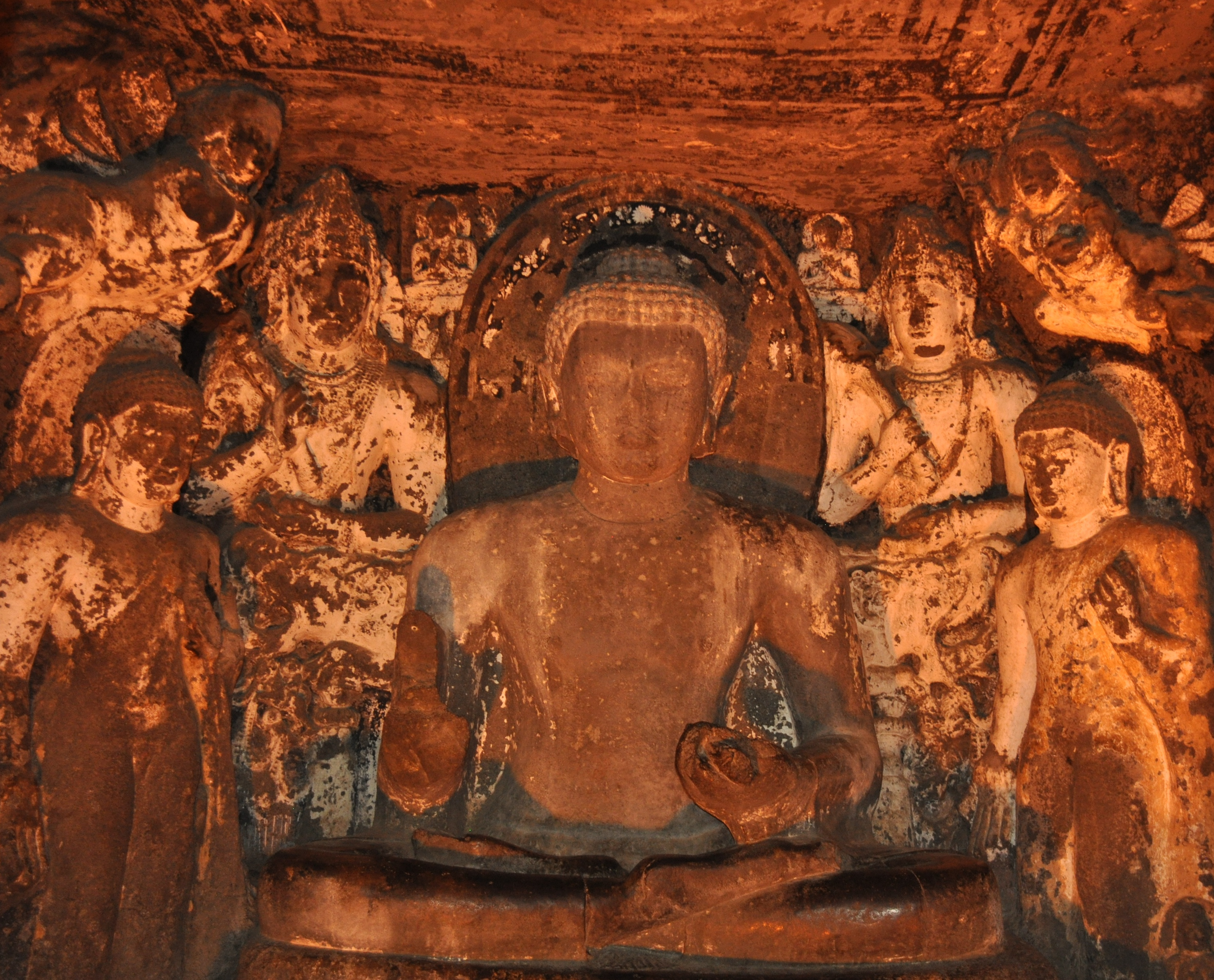
Buddha in a preaching pose flanked by bodhisattvas in Cave 4, Ajanta

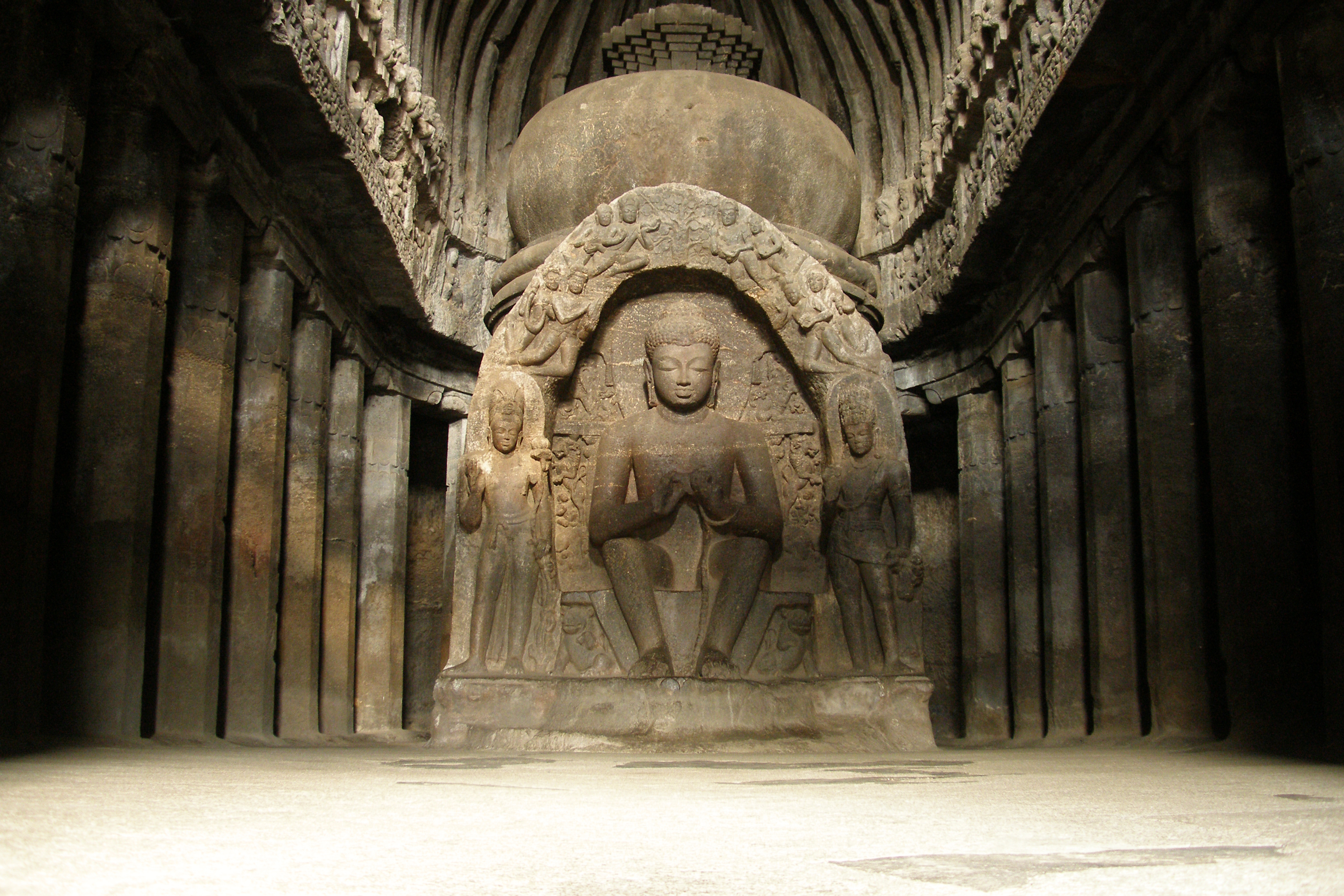
Cave 10, Ellora Caves

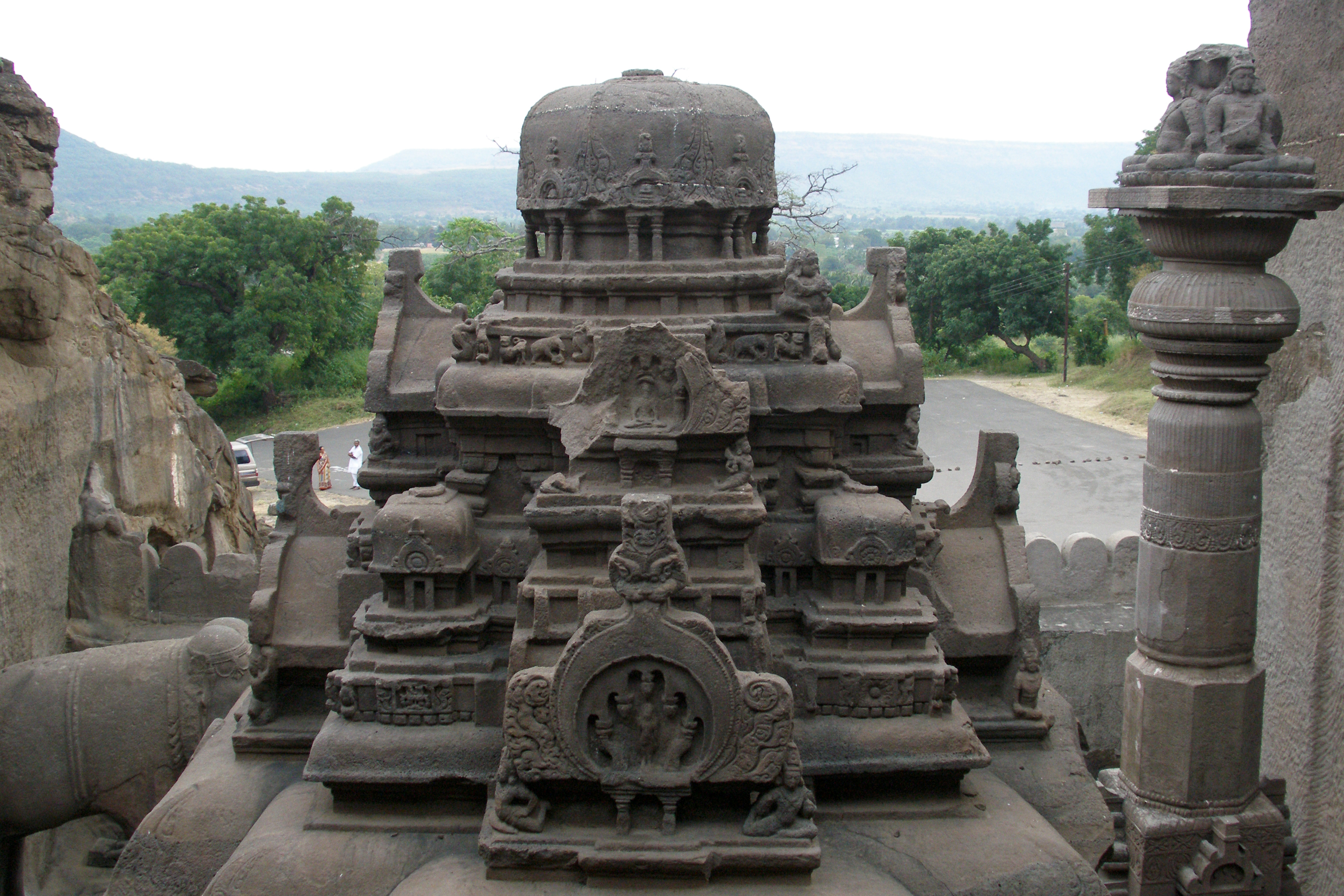
Indra Sabha, Ellora Caves

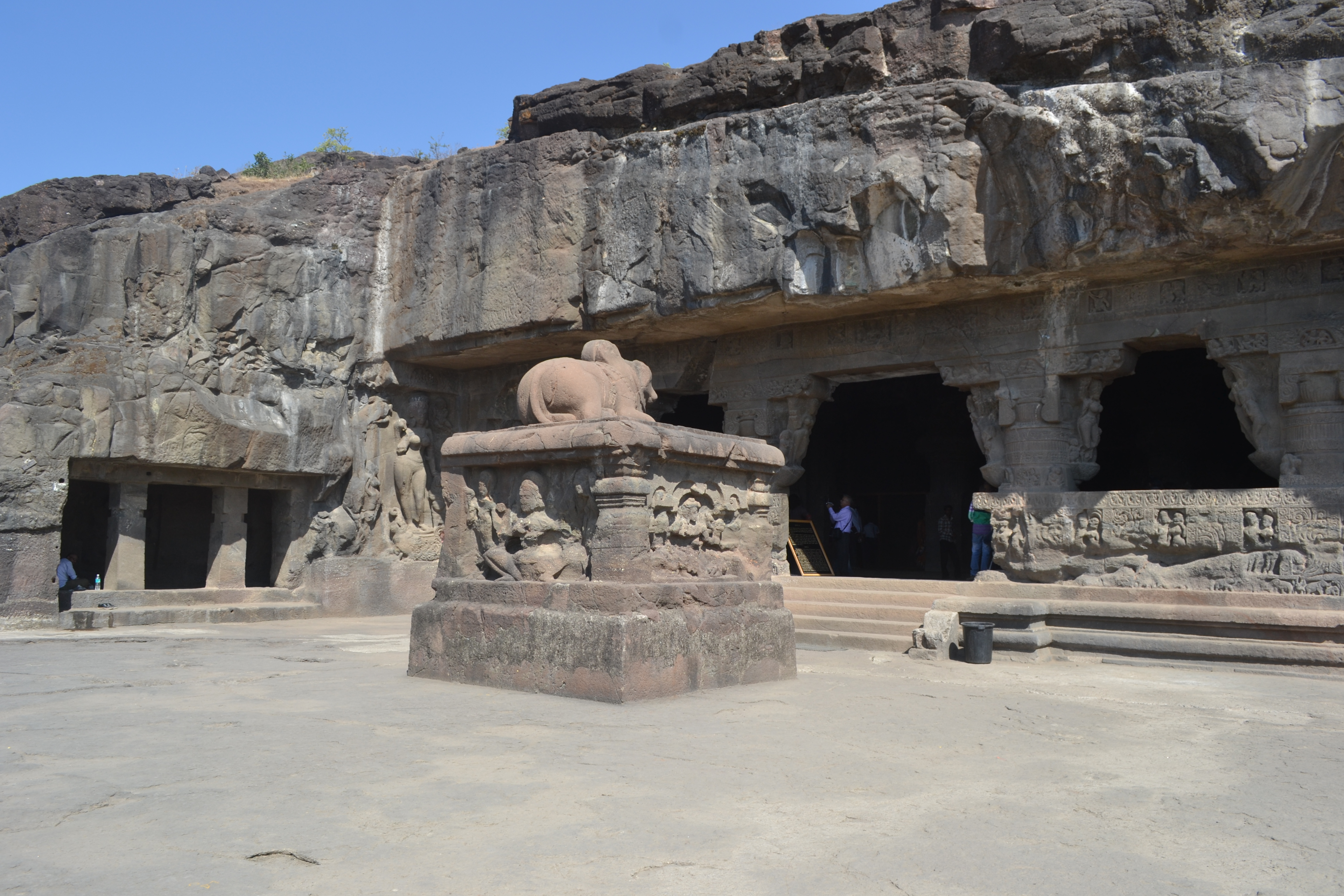
Cave 21, Ellora Caves

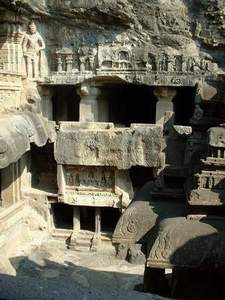
Jain cave in Ellora

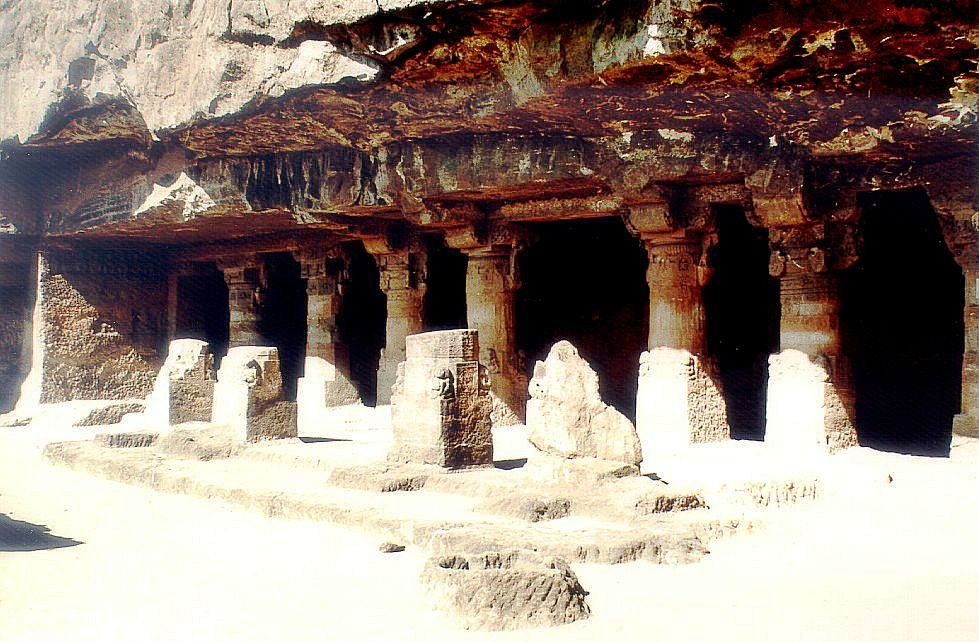
Aurangabad Caves

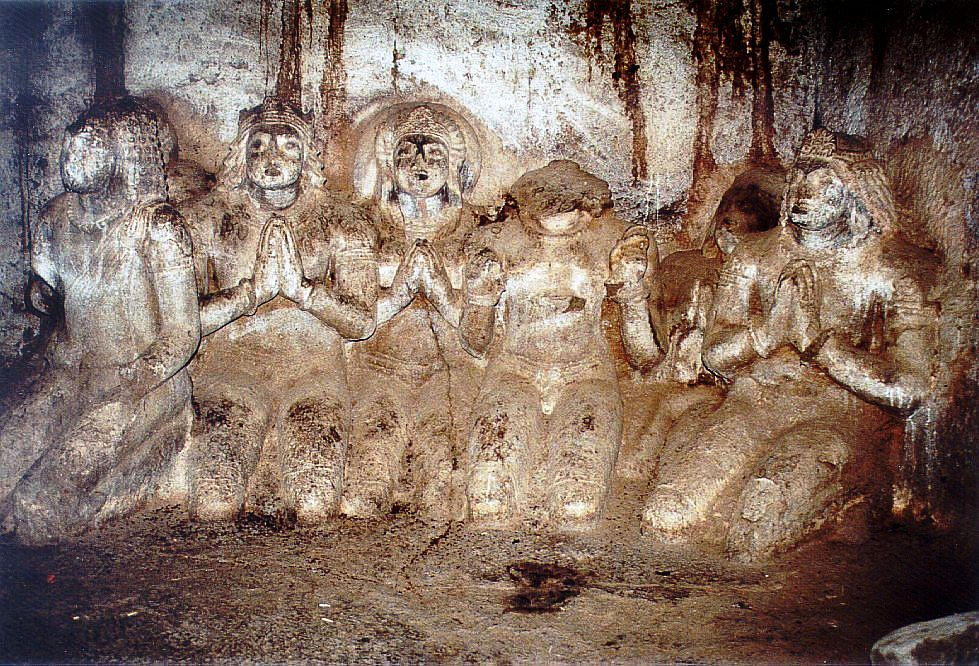
Art in Aurangabad Caves

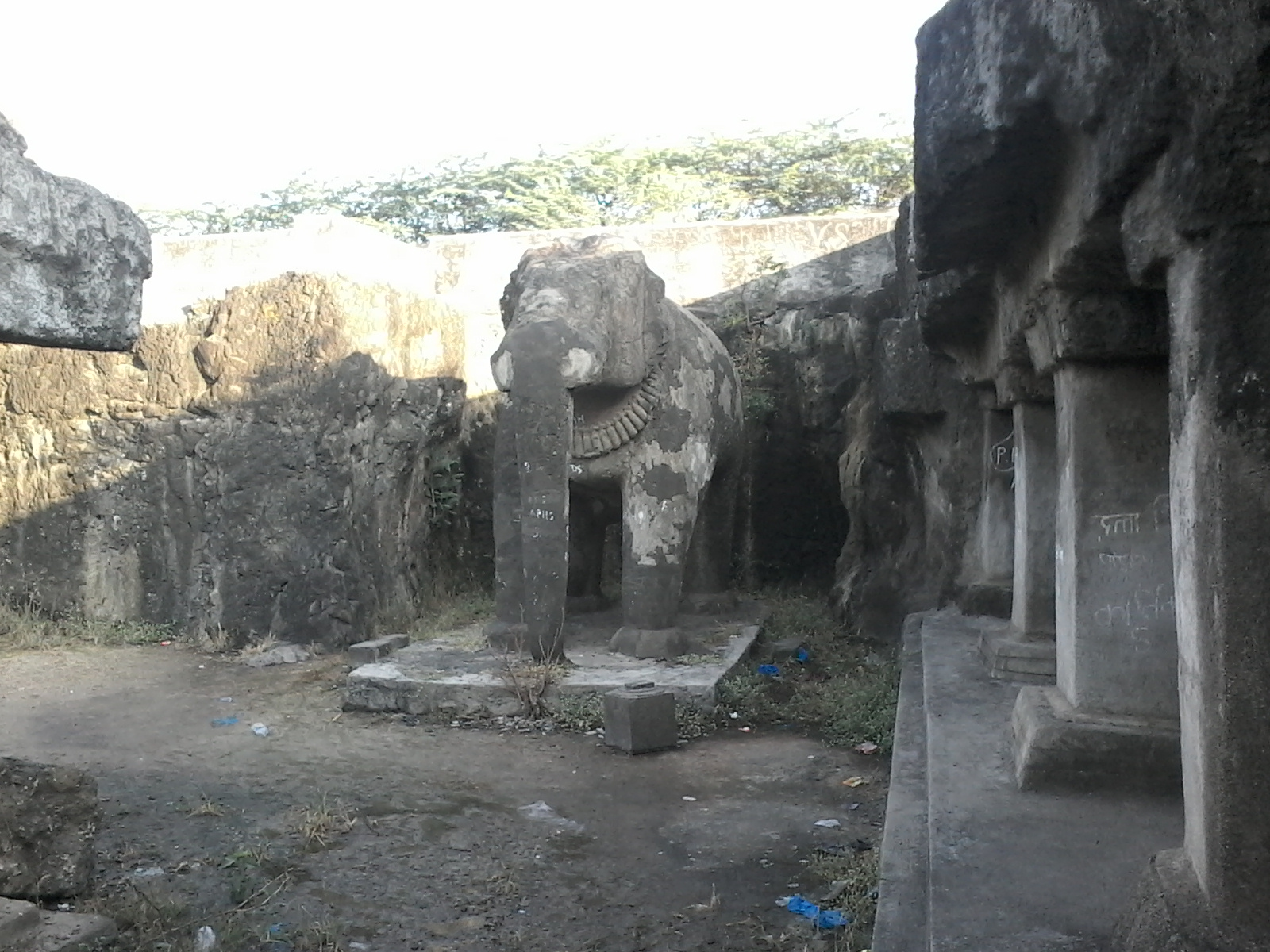
Shivleni Caves in Ambajogai, Beed district

== Religious tourism ==
=== Hindu temples ===
Jyotirlingas are known as "Signs of God Shiva". These are mentioned in the Shiva Purana. It is believed that Shiva first manifested himself as a Jyotirlinga on the night of the Aridra Nakshatra, thus the special reverence for the Jyotirlinga. There is nothing to distinguish the appearance, but it is believed that a person can see these lingas as columns of fire piercing through the earth after he reaches a higher level of spiritual attainment. Though contested with other claimants elsewhere for each of these, the following are Jyotirlingas in Marathwada:

- Grishneshwar Temple (Aurangabad district)
- Aundha Nagnath Temple (Hingoli district)
- Shri Vaijnath Temple (Parli, Beed district)

Two other Jyothirlingas—Bhimashankar and Trimbakeshwar Shiva Temple—are also in Maharashtra state, close to Marathwada.

Other major Hindu temples include:

- Tulja Bhavani Temple (Tuljapur, Osmanabad district) – considered one of 51 Shakti Peethas and one among the Saadeteen (3.5) Shakti Peethas of Maharashtra. (A Shakti Peetha is a place to worship various forms of goddess Shakti.)
- Renuka Devi temple (Mahur, Nanded district) – another Shakti Pitha among the Saadeteen (3.5) Shakti Peethas of Maharashtra
- Mahalakshmi Devi temple (Kolhapur, Kolhapur district) – another Shakti Pitha among the Saadeteen (3.5) Shakti Peethas of Maharashtra
- Saptashrungi Devi temple (Saptashurungi Gad, Nashik district) – another Shakti Pitha among the Saadeteen (3.5) Shakti Peethas of Maharashtra
- Jyotiba temple (Jyotiba Dongar, Kolhapur district) – Known as Daccan Cha Raja
- Khandoba temple (Jejuri, Pune district) – Known as Combined attributes of Shiva, the sun god Surya, and Bhairava. Kuldaivat(Family Deity) of many families in Maharashtra.
- Ambajogai/Yogeshwari Temple (Ambajogai)
- Kailasa Temple, Ellora (Aurangabad district) – one of the largest rock-cut ancient Hindu temples; built in the 8th century by the Rashtrakuta king Krishna I
- Ganesha temple, Rajur Ganapati (Jalna district) – a complete Ganesha Peetha situated on hill in Rajur
- Sai Baba Birth Temple (Pathri) – the birthplace of the Indian spiritual master Sai Baba of Shirdi
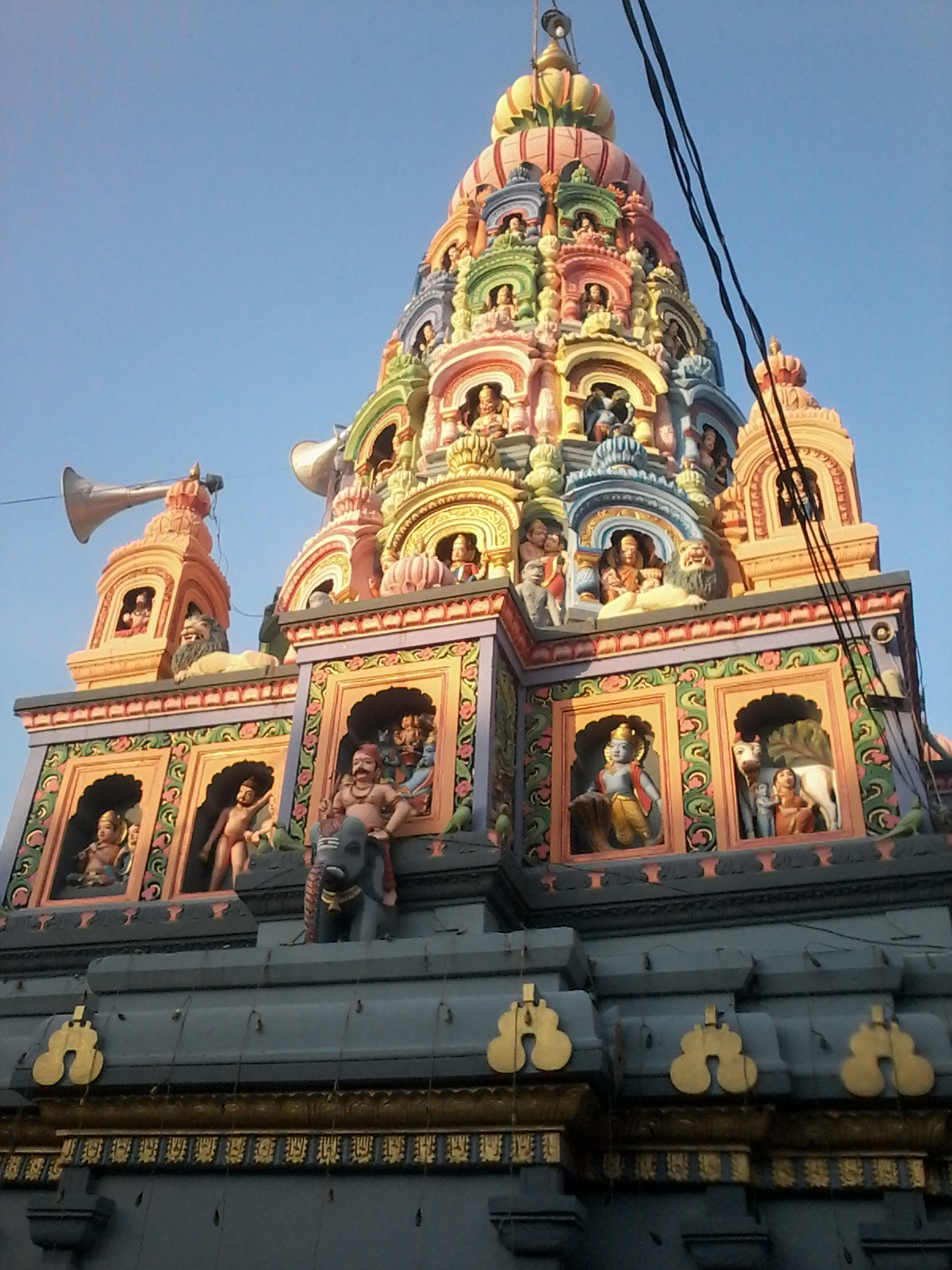
Ambajogai Temple in Ambajogai

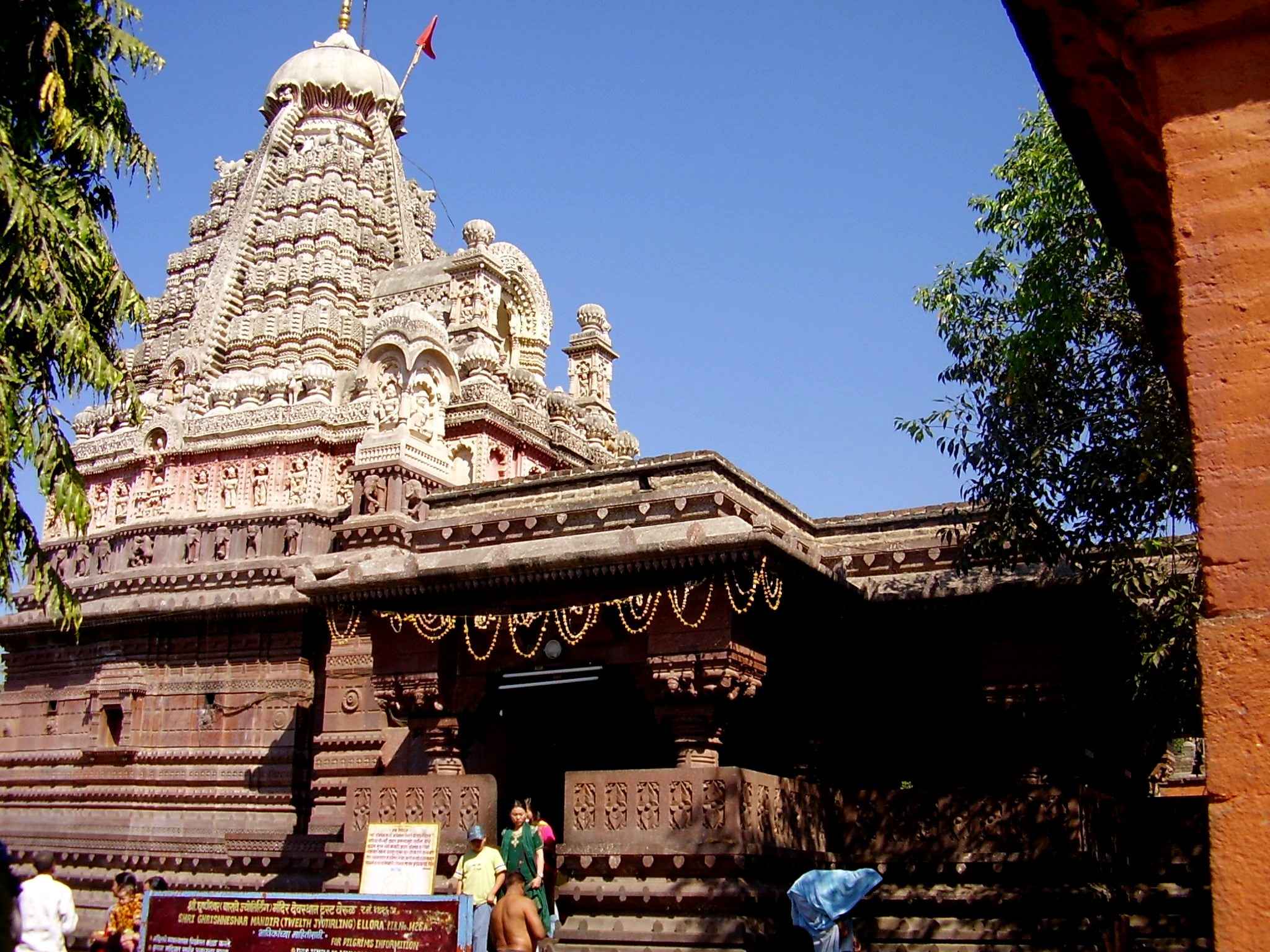
Grishneshwar Temple

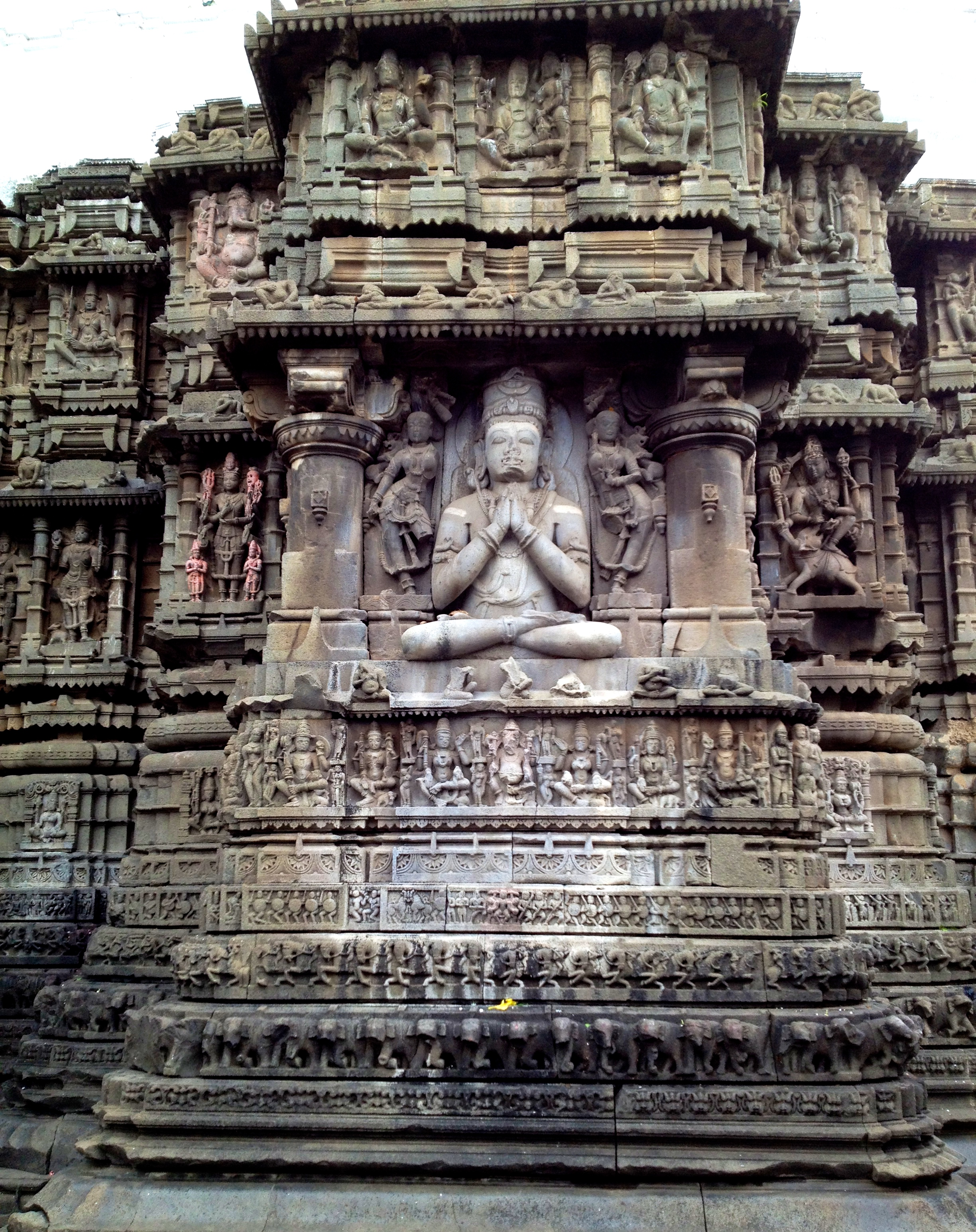
Aundha Nagnath Temple

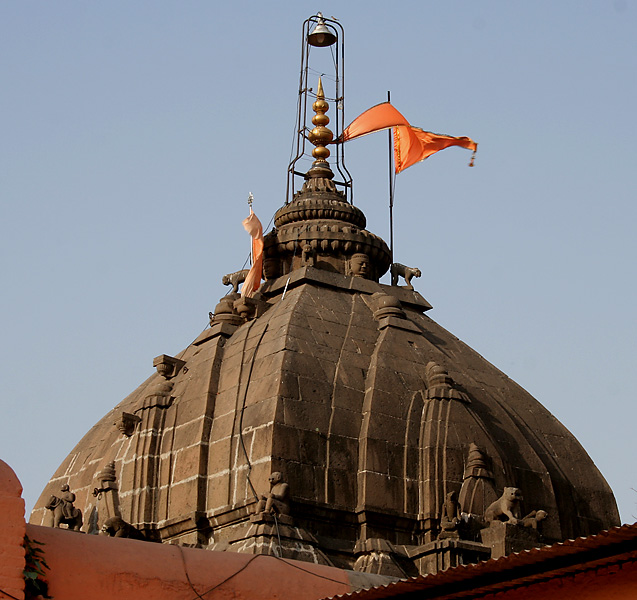
Parli Vaijnath Temple

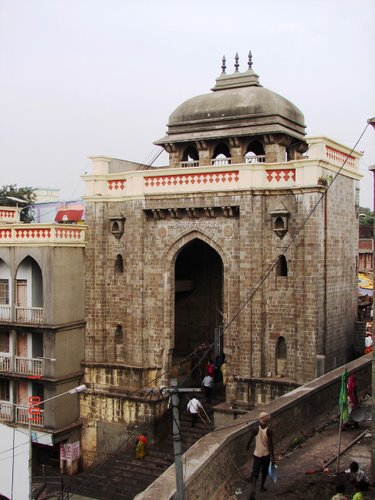
Tulja Bhavani Temple

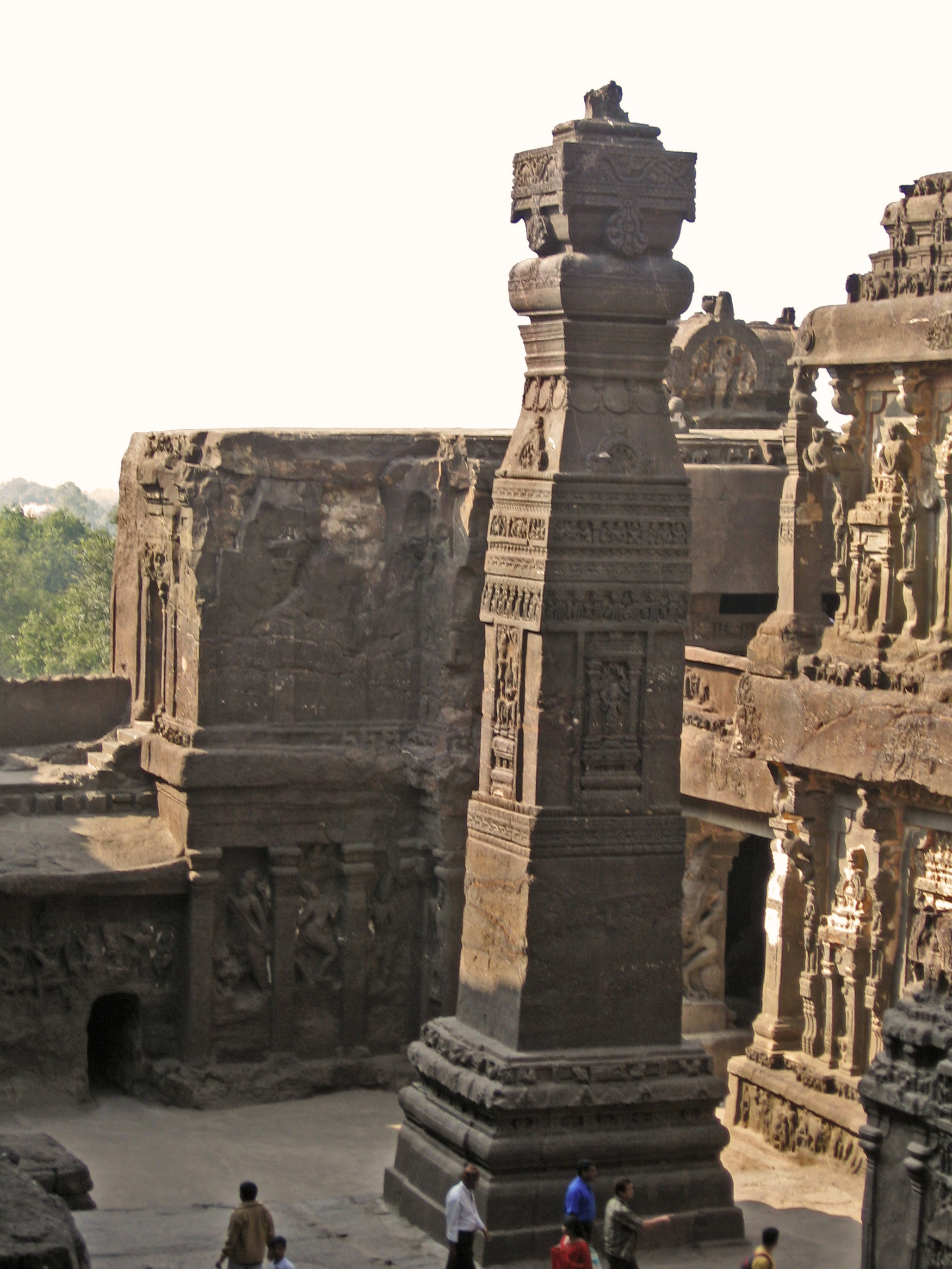
Stone carved pillar at Kailasa Temple, Ellora

=== Sikh gurdwaras ===
Locations of the five takhts of Sikhism in India

Marathwada is the second most-visited region by Sikhs in India after Punjab. The main gurdwara in Marathwada is Hazur Sahib in Nanded.

The city of Nanded has been associated with the first and the last of the Sikh Gurus. Guru Nanak Dev passed through Nanded during his extensive travels (which took him as far south as Sri Lanka); Guru Gobind Singh spent his last years in the city. Bhai Daya Singh, one of the Panj Pyare of Sikhism, lived in Aurangabad and has a gurdwara in the city named in his honor: Gurdwara Bhai Daya Singh.

The major gurdwaras in Marathwada include:

- Hazur Sahib – the most sacred takht among Panj Takht of Sikhism. It is known for Guru Gaddi, an annual event in November which marks establishment of the Guru Granth Sahib as permanent guru by Guru Gobind Singh. In 2008, on the 300th anniversary of establishment of Guru Granth Sahib, thousands of followers visited the gurdwara.
- Gurdwara Bhai Daya Singh – gurdwara in Aurangabad related to Daya Singh
- Gurdwara Nagina Ghat Sahib – gurdwara on the riverbank in Nanded
- Gurdwara Baba Banda Bahadur Ghat – where Banda Singh Bahadur lived in Nanded
- Gurdwara Hira Ghat Sahib – where Guru Gobind Singh first pitched his tent in Nanded on the banks of Godavari River
- Gurdwara Mata Sahib
- Gurdwara Shikar Ghat Sahib
- Gurdwara Mal Tekari Sahib
- Gurdwara Sangat Sahib
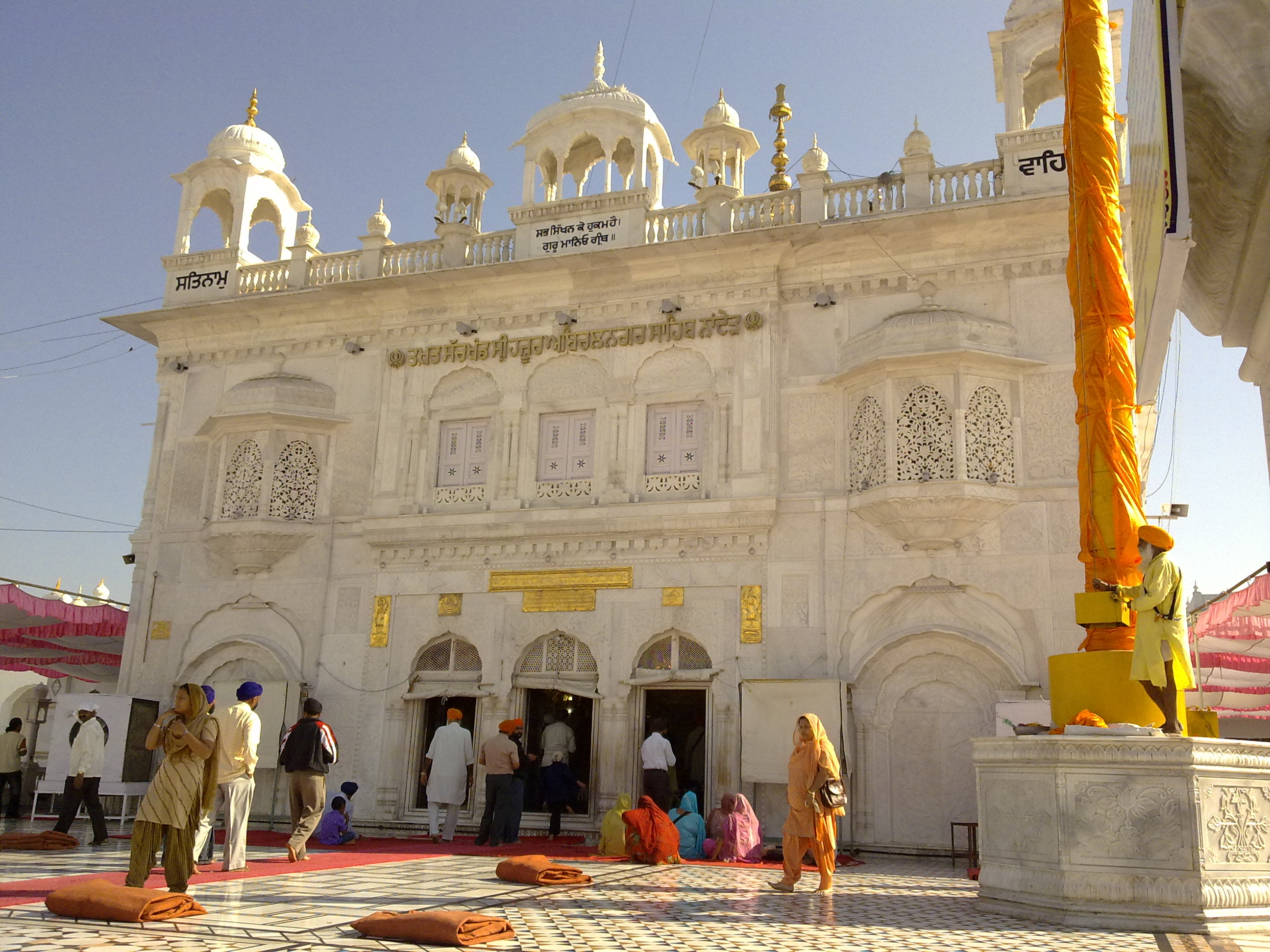
Hazur Sahib

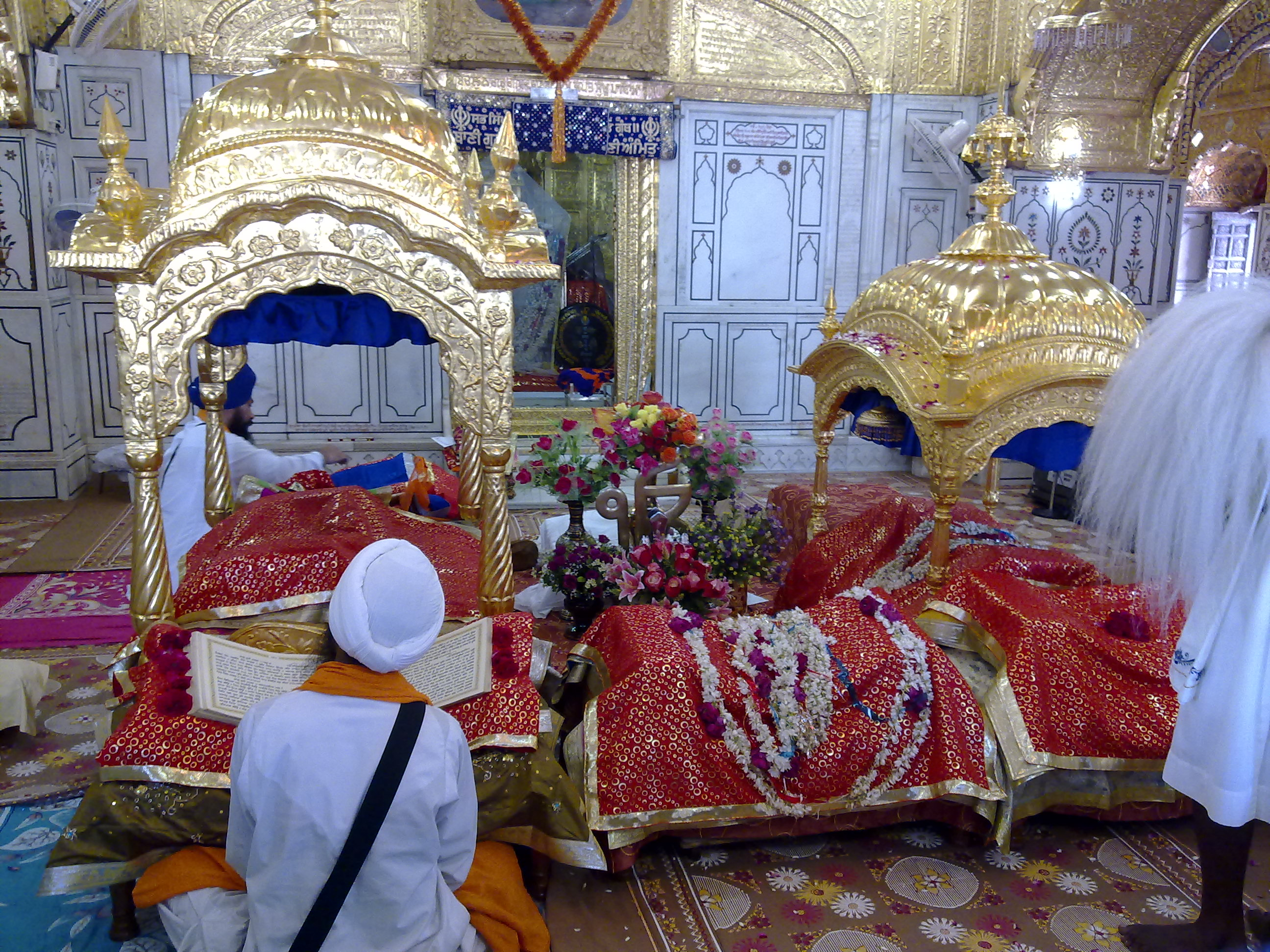
Interior of Hazur Sahib

=== Islamic sites ===
Historically, Marathwada was part of Mughal Empire and Nizam of Hyderabad, which has given the region its own Islamic heritage in the form of art and culture. The following are some of important places connected with Sufism and Islamic leaders in Marathwada:

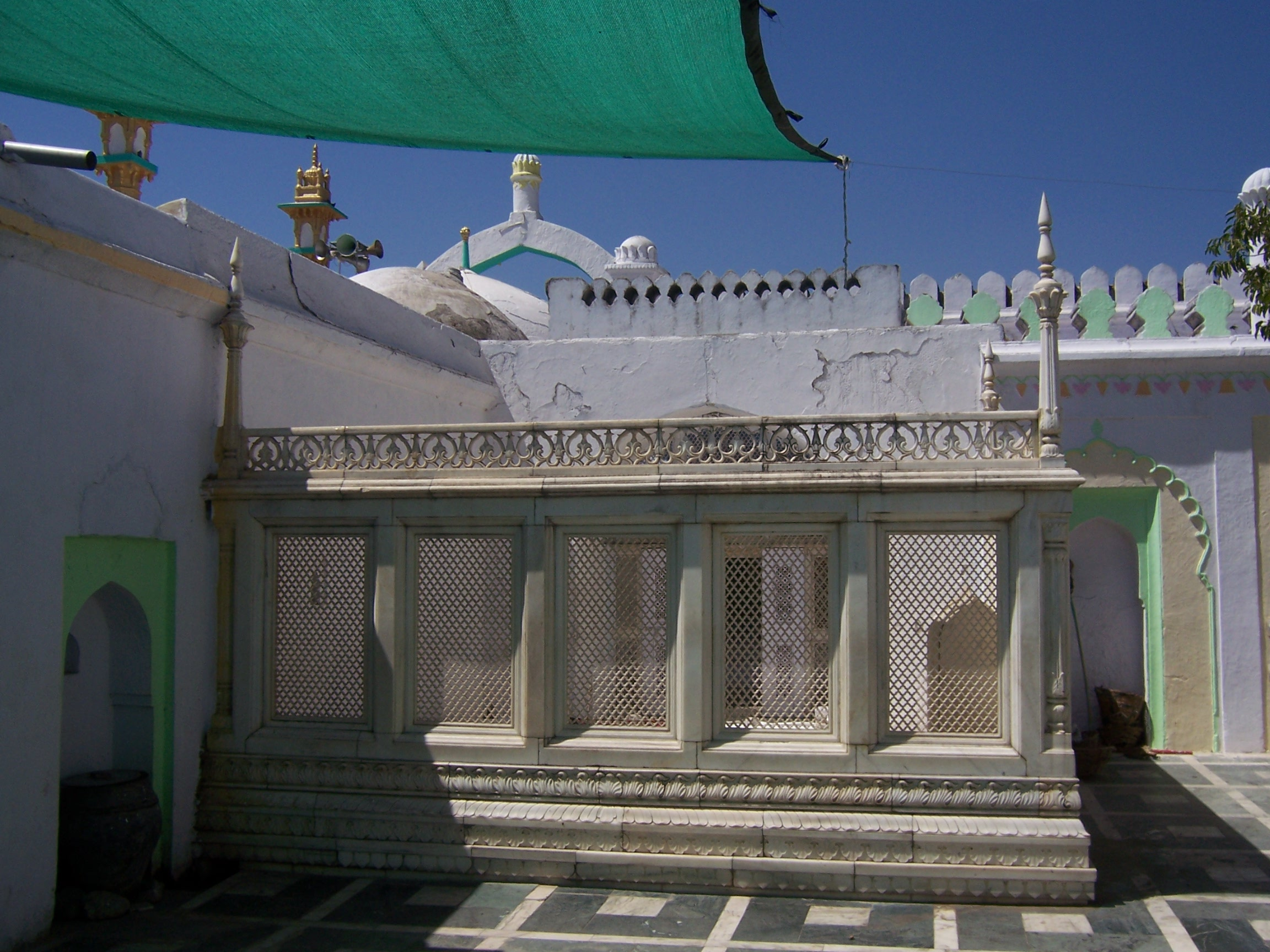
Tomb of Aurangzeb in Khuldabad

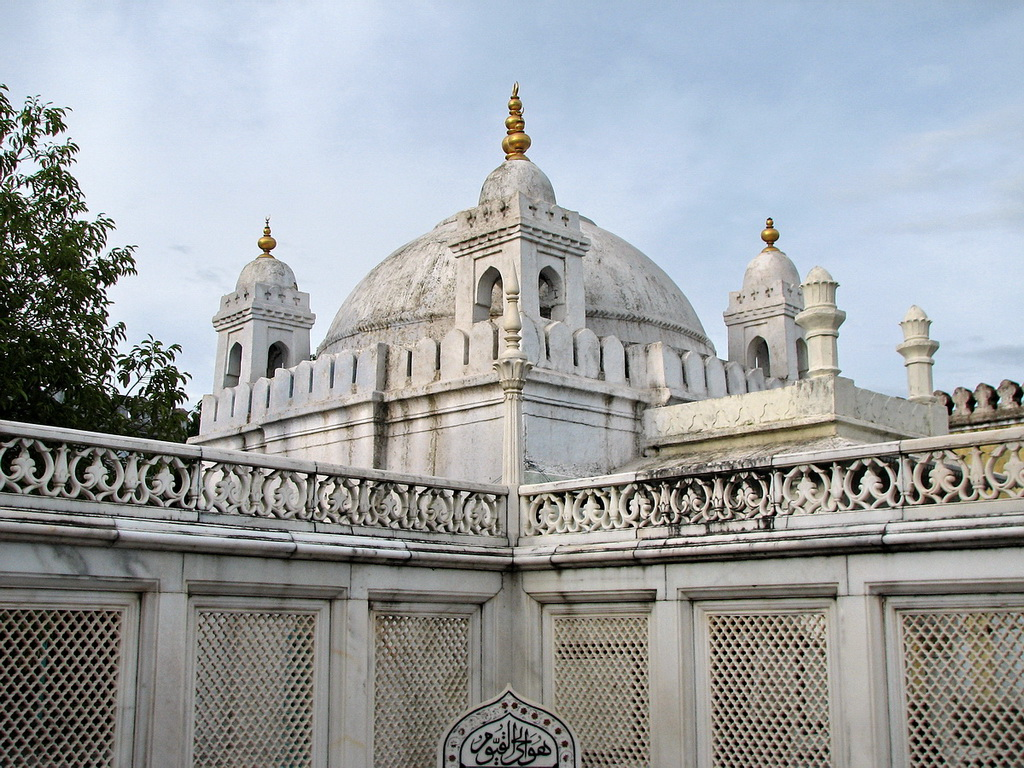
Zainuddin Shirzai Maqbara, Khuldabad

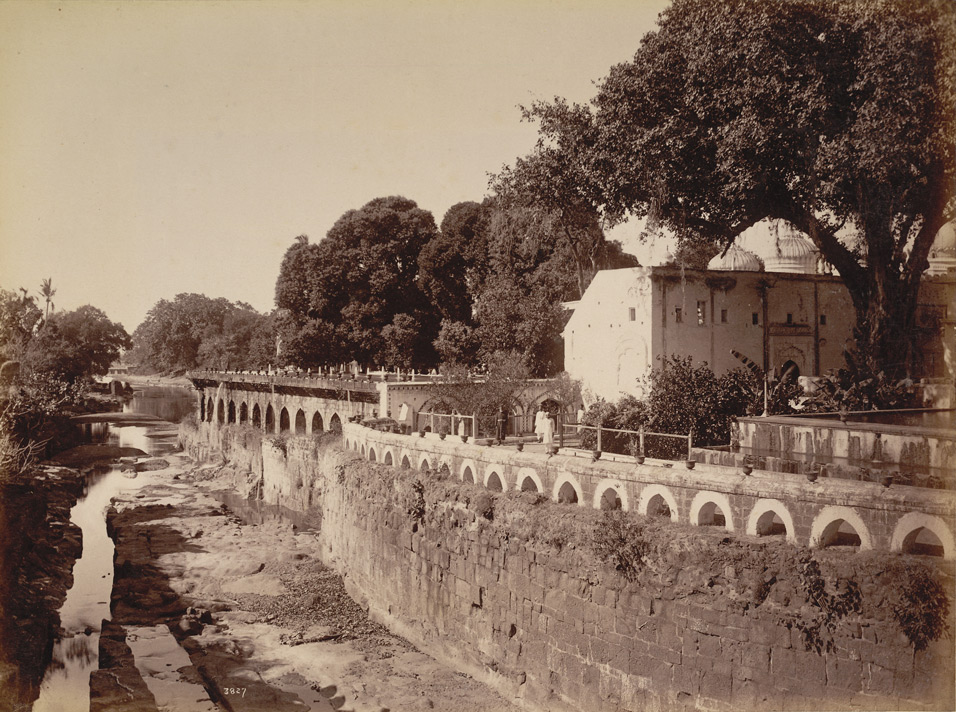
Panchakki, Dargah Baba Shah Mosafar 1880s

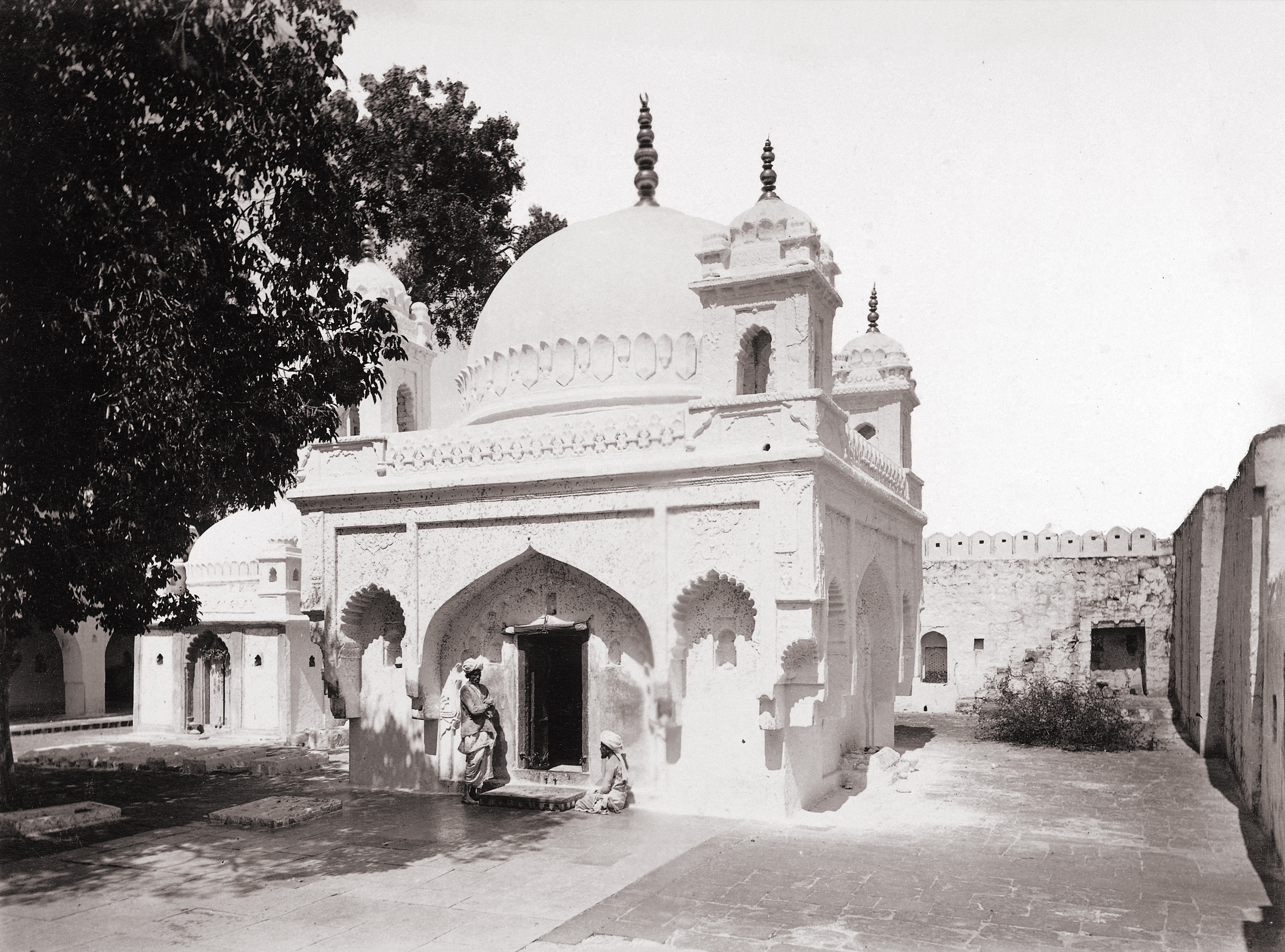
Tomb of Zar Zari Zar Baksh, Khuldabad, 1890s

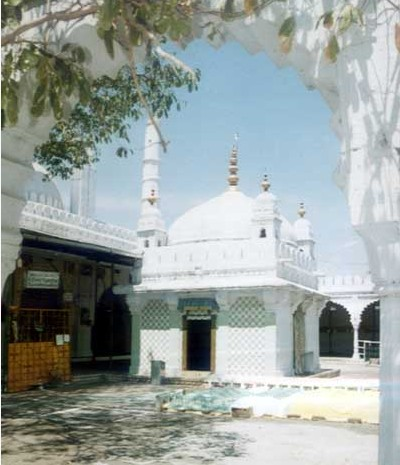
Tomb of Sayyid Burhan-ud-din, Khuldabad

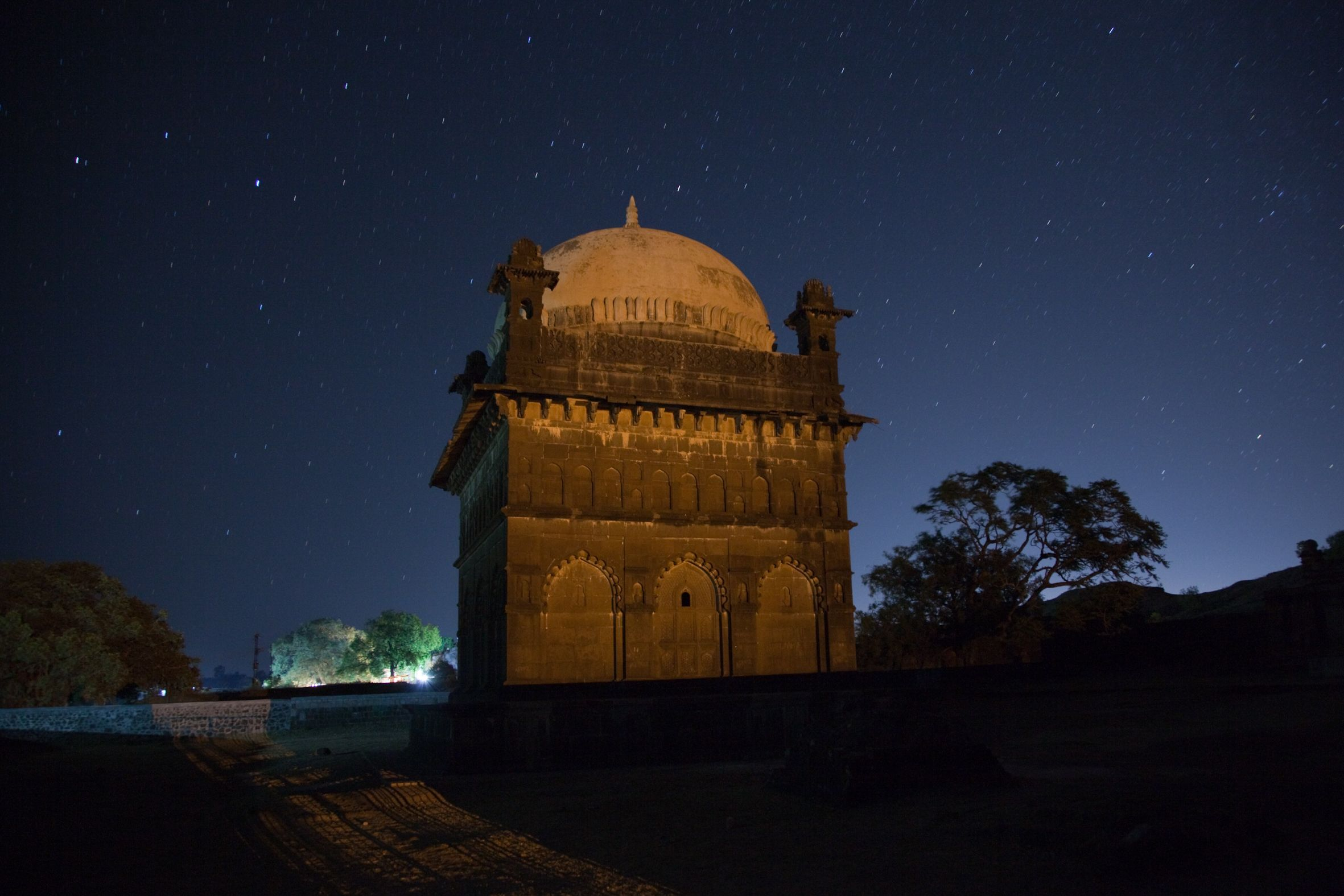
Tomb of Malik Ambar, Khuldabad

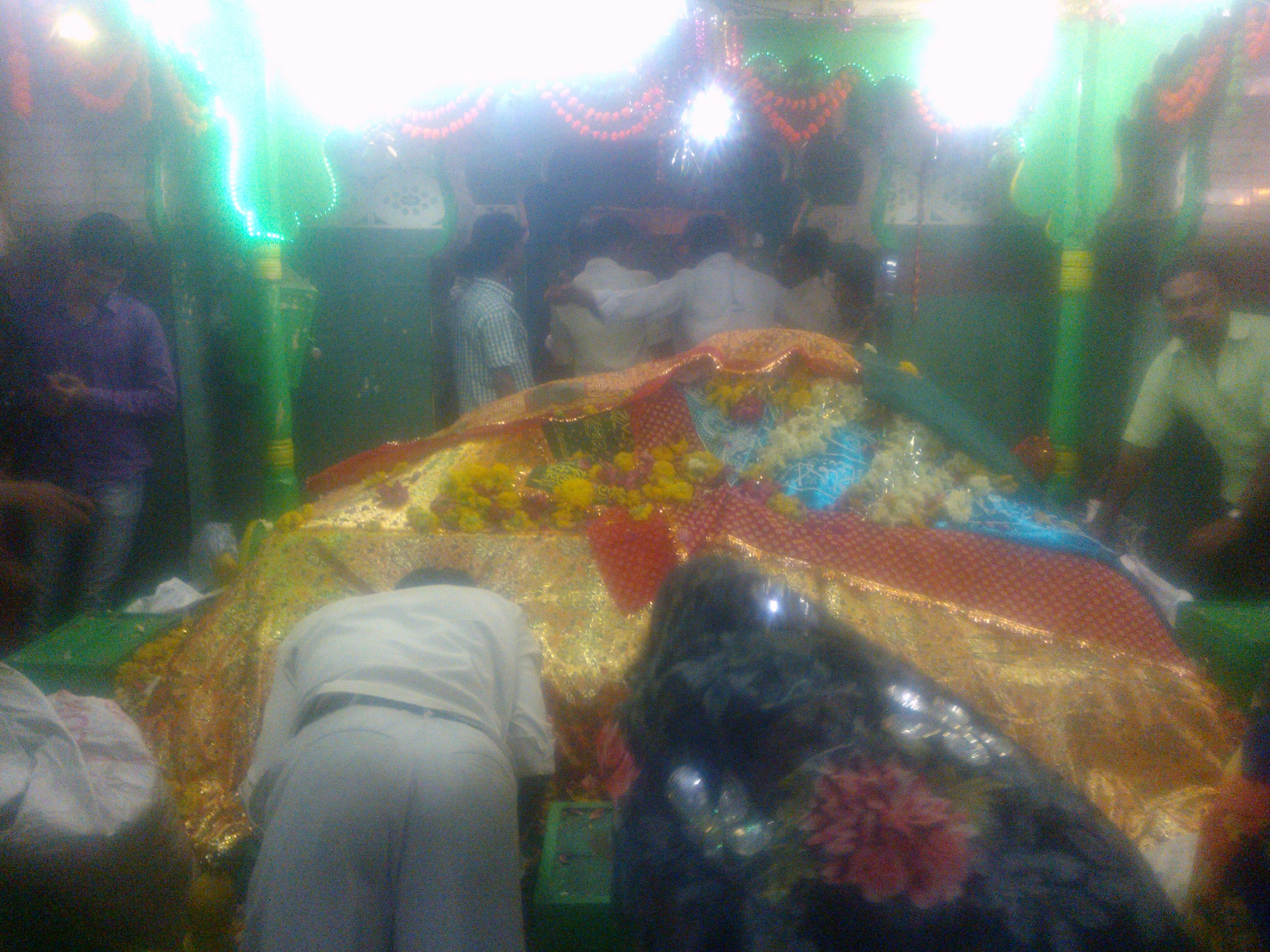
Shrine of Turabul Haq Dargah in Parbhani

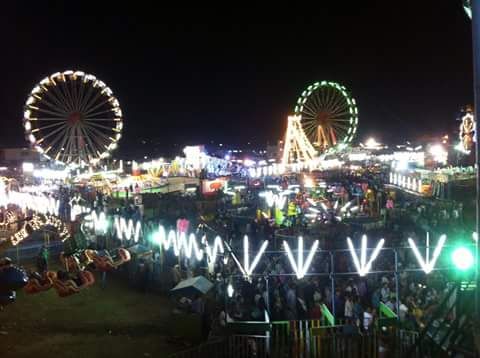
108-year-old annual Parbhani festival at Turabul Haq Dargah

== Monuments and forts ==
Of the 244 state-protected monuments in Maharashtra state, 110 are in Marathwada. The following are some of these monuments:

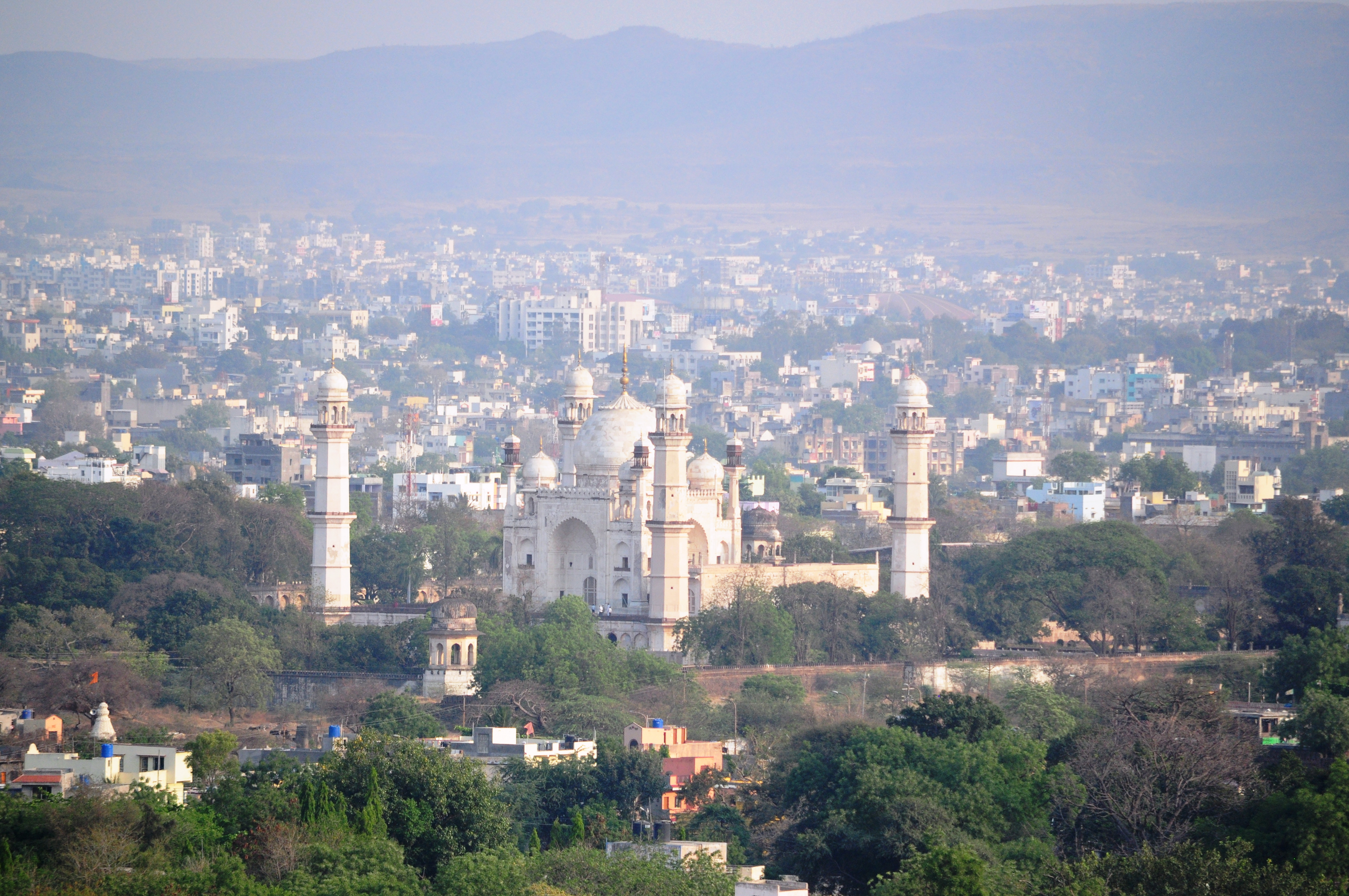
Bird’s eye view of Bibi Ka Maqbara in Aurangabad.

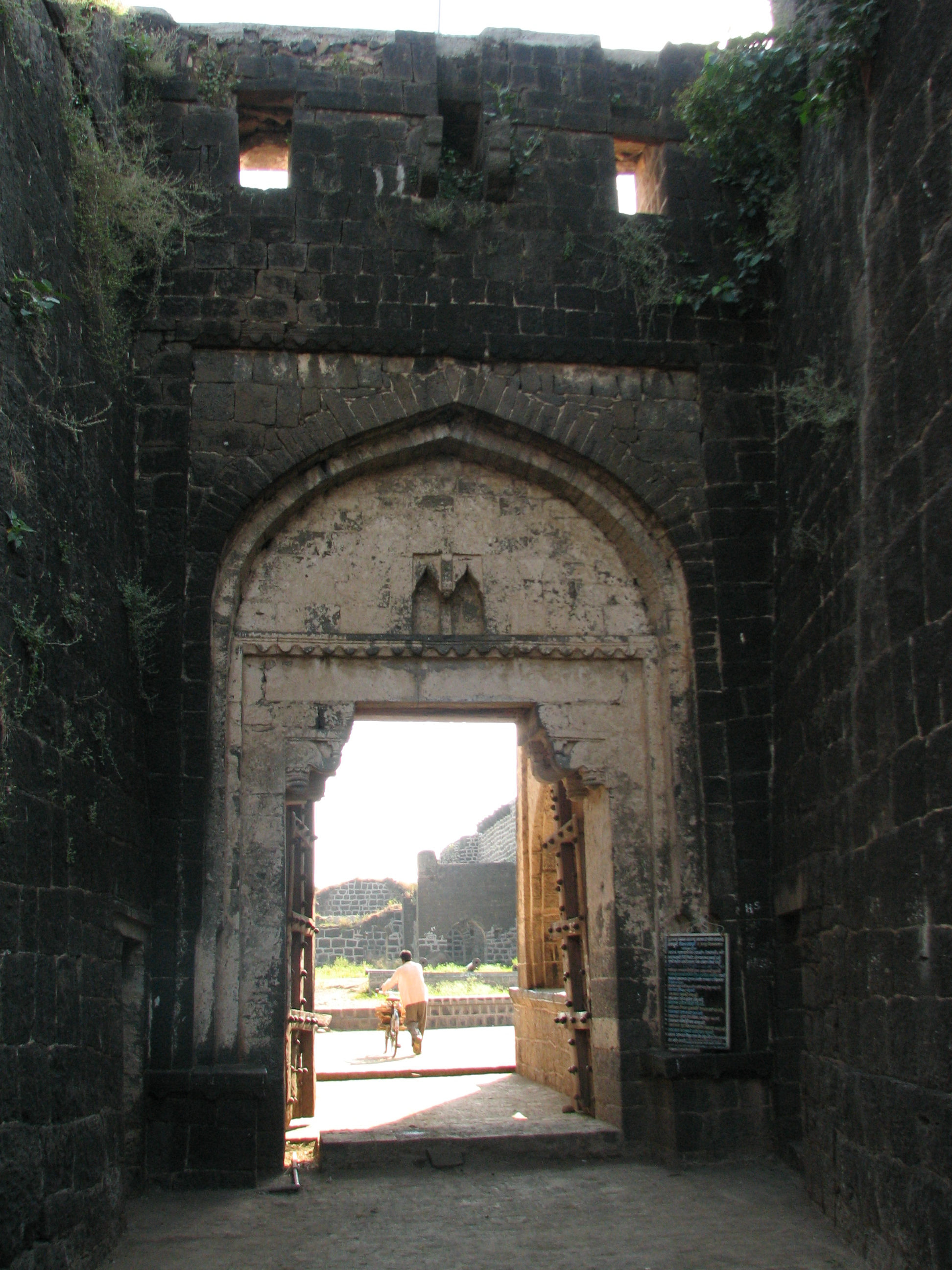
Main entrance of Naldurg Fort in Osmanabad

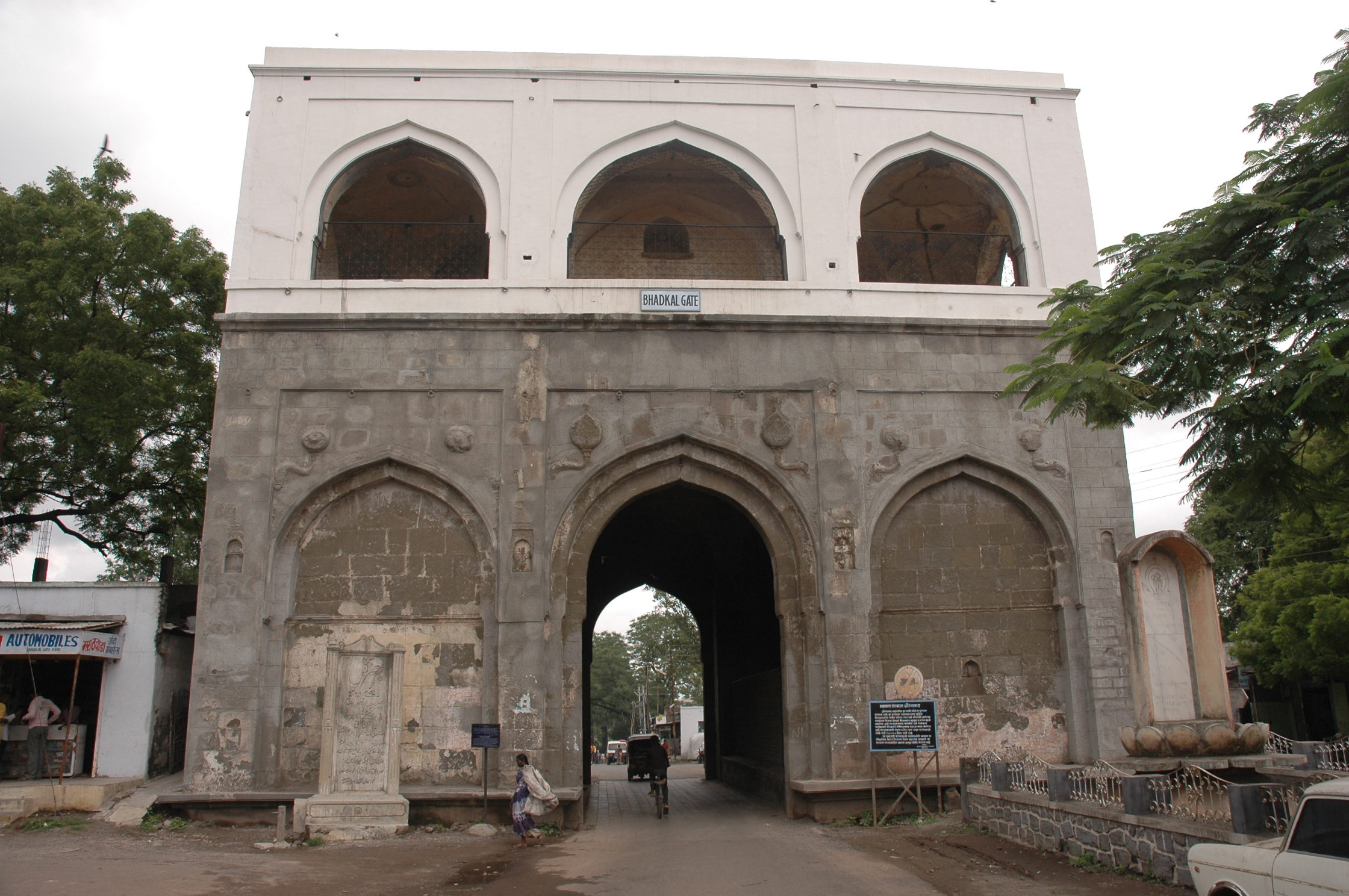
Bhadkal Gate in Aurangabad

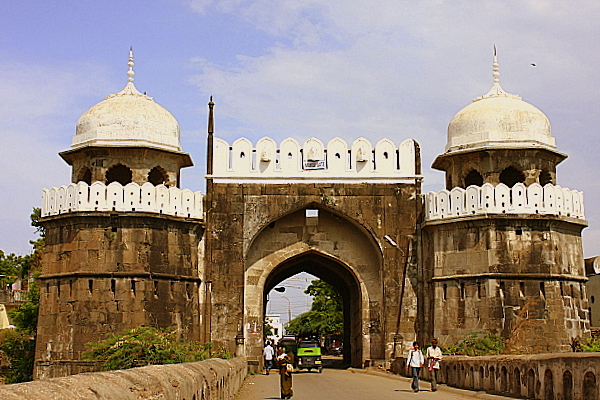
Mecca Gate in Aurangabad

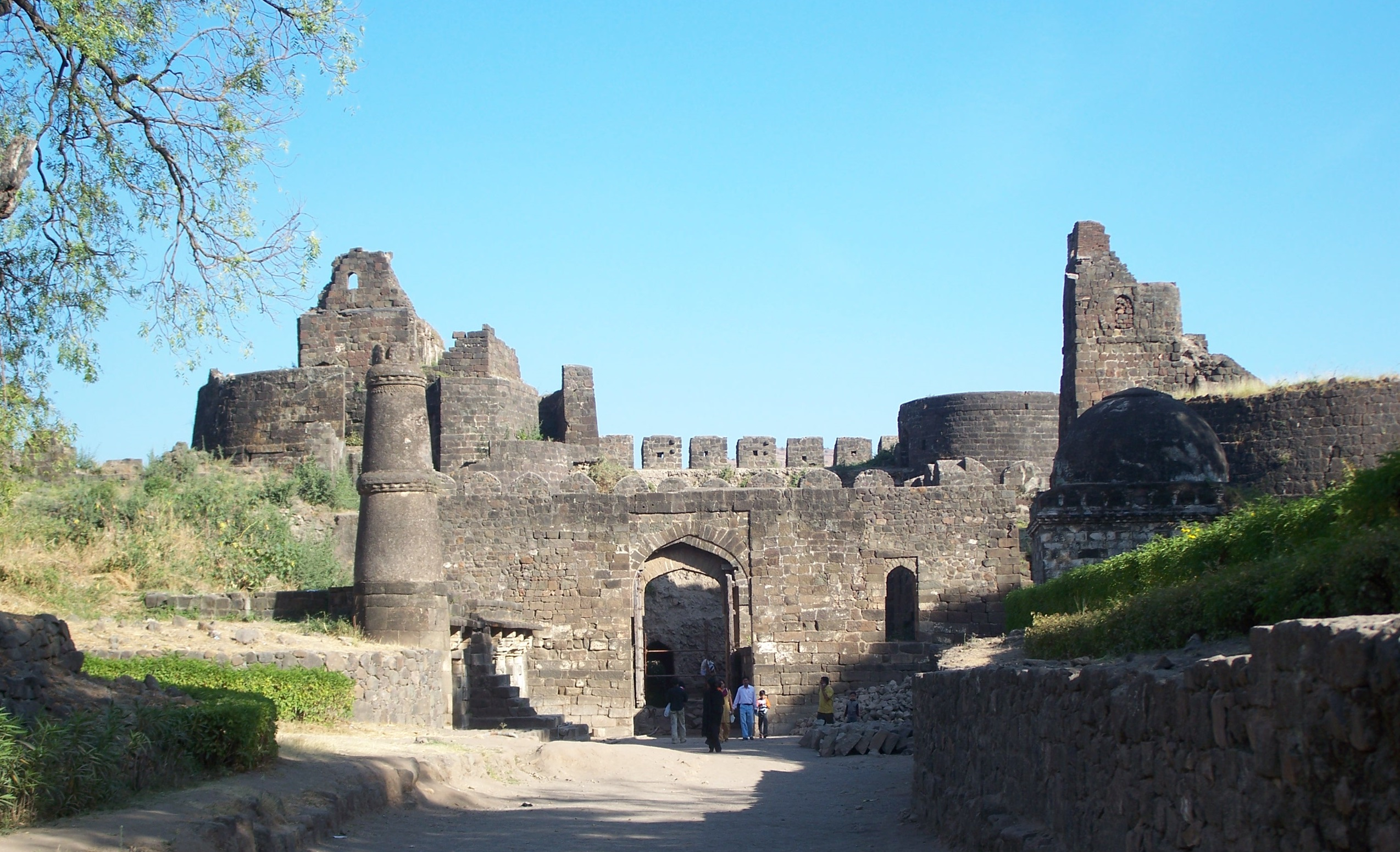
Daulatabad (Deogiri) Fort

== See also ==
- Tourism in India
- Tourism in Maharashtra
