= Hazur Sahib =

Religious centre in Sikhism

Sri Hazur Sahib
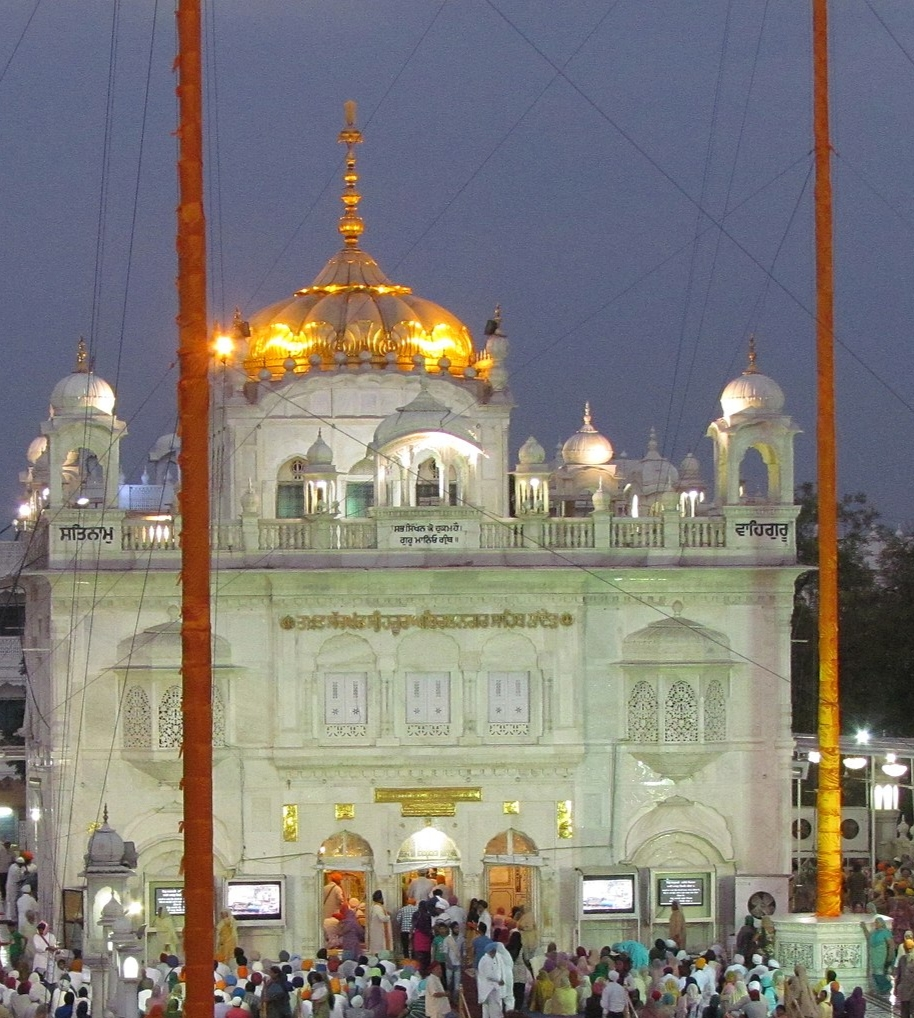
- The Hazur Sahib

General information
- Architectural style: Sikh architecture
- Location: Nanded, Maharashtra, India
- Coordinates: 19°09′10″N 77°19′07″E
- Construction started: 1832

Hazur Sahib (Note: Also spelt as Hazoor Sahib.) (Hazūrī Sāhib; lit. 'presence of the sahib/master'), officially Takht Sachkhand Sri Hazur Abchalnagar Sahib, is one of the five takhts (religious centres) in Sikhism. The gurdwara (Sikh house of worship) was built between 1832 and 1837 by Maharaja Ranjit Singh (1780–1839). It is located on the banks of the Godavari River at the city of Nanded in the state of Maharashtra, India.

The structure is built at the place where Guru Gobind Singh Ji died. The gurdwara within the complex is known as Sach-Khand (Realm of Truth). The inner room of the gurdwara is called the Angitha Sahib and is built over the place where Gobind Singh was cremated in 1708.

== History ==
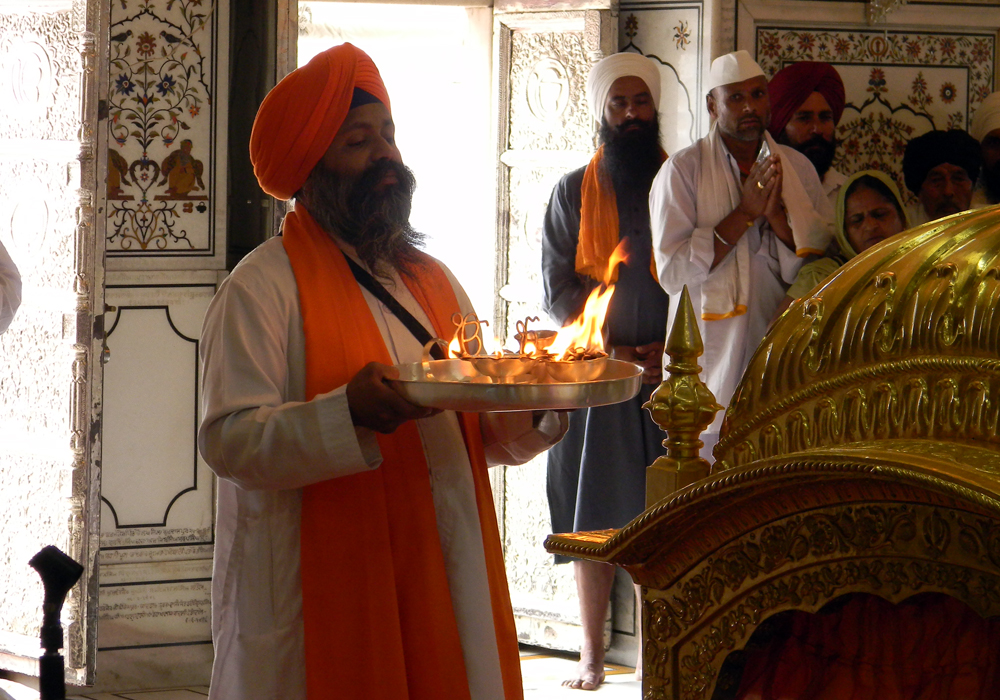
Aarti prayers in Hazur Sahib Nanded

Hazur Sahib marks the site where Guru Gobind Singh ji had his camp in 1708. The Guru held his court and congregation here and was convalescing after being attacked by two would-be assassins. One of the attackers stabbed the Guru, and was killed by him with a single stroke of his talwar (curved sword). The other was killed by his followers as he tried to escape. The Guru's wound was deep, but initially healed after being stitched by an English surgeon sent by Bahadur Shah I, who served as his doctor, and Dara Shikoh before him. The wound re-opened a few days later when the Guru was stringing a bow for one of his Sikhs and the Guru merged into the Primal (Joti Jot) after declaring the Guru Granth Sahib as his successor.

All the functions are carried out by the priests in the outer room. The inner room is a vault that houses valuable objects, weapons and other personal belongings of the Guru. No one except the head priest can enter the vault.

=== Heritage conservation ===
Sikh historians and scholars have raised alarms regarding the plight of Sikh historical heritage within the Takht Hazur Sahib complex. Many historical structures have been destroyed by the takht's management committee, much to the dismay of a vocal section of Sikhs who pleaded for these sites to be preserved in their original state. Sharad Chalikwar, a consultant engineer, and Kiran Kalamdani, a restoration architect, had come up with restoration plans to save the historical buildings but Hazur Sahib's management committee ended-up demolishing the buildings under the guise of Kar Seva renovations.

The buildings that were destroyed include:

- Ramgarhia Bunga (Note: Not to be confused with a building with the same name located near the Golden Temple in Amritsar.), constructed upon the patronage of Maharaja Ranjit Singh. Demolished in January 2007 under the supervision of the police.
- Baradari, constructed upon the patronage of Maharaja Ranjit Singh. Demolished in October 2007.

The gurdwara management committee, specifically chairman P.S. Pasricha, defended their action to destroy the historical sites because of their age, dilapidated condition, need for "beautification", needing room for their development plans, and that land has been allotted for the building of a new 31-room sarai with a museum. Meanwhile, conservators Sharad Chalikwar and Kiran Kalamdani trying to save the structure faced pushback and hostility .

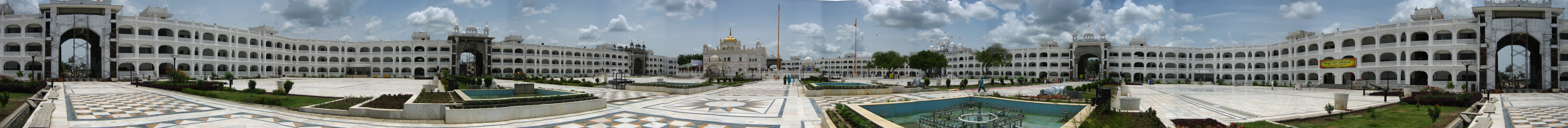

== Gallery ==
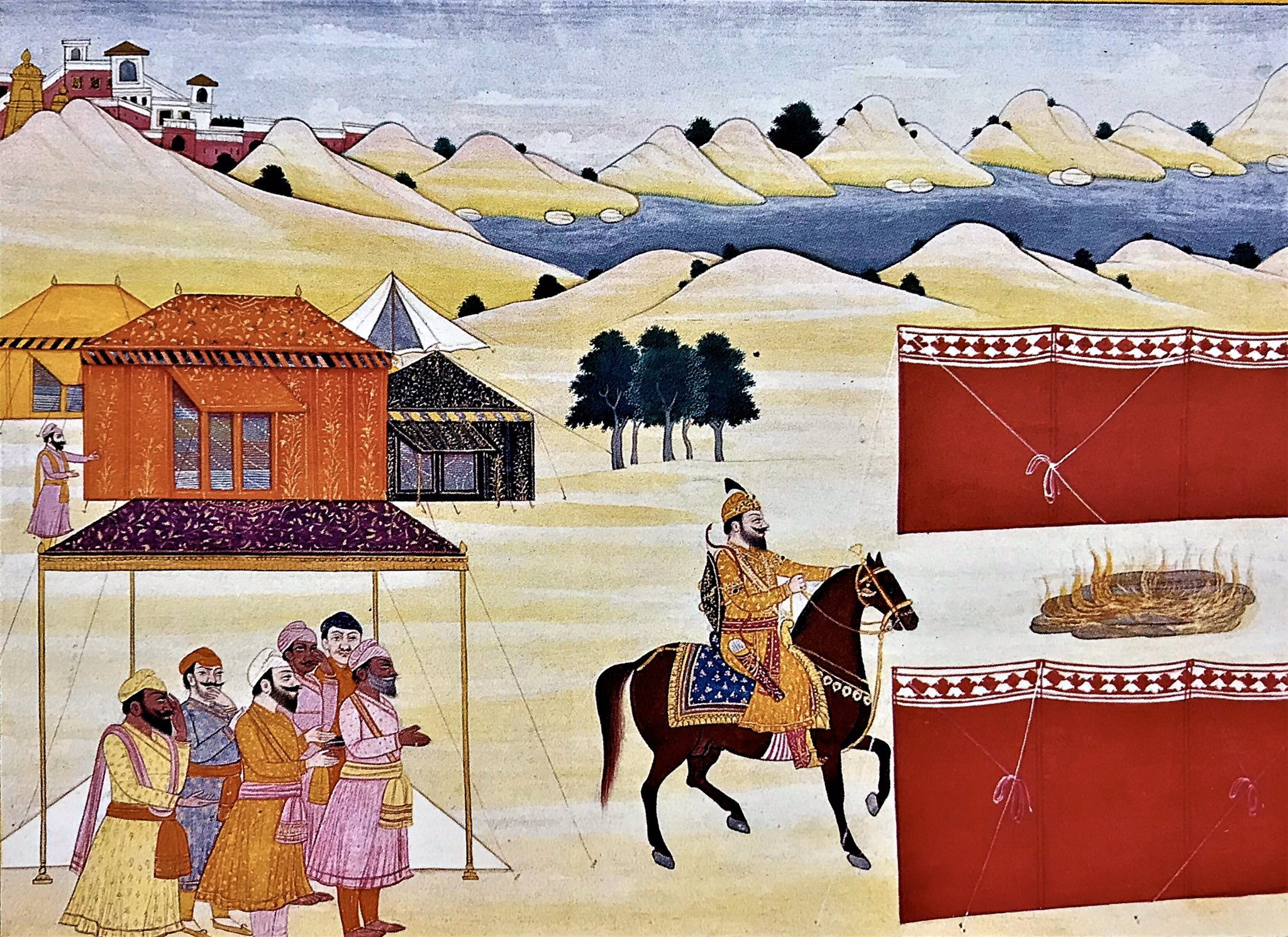
Cremation of Guru Gobind Singh at Nanded

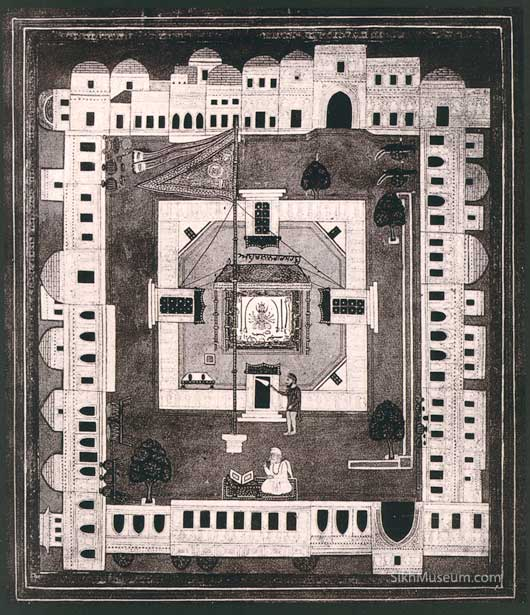
Overhead map of Takht Sri Hazoor Sahib Gurdwara complex, ca.1870.

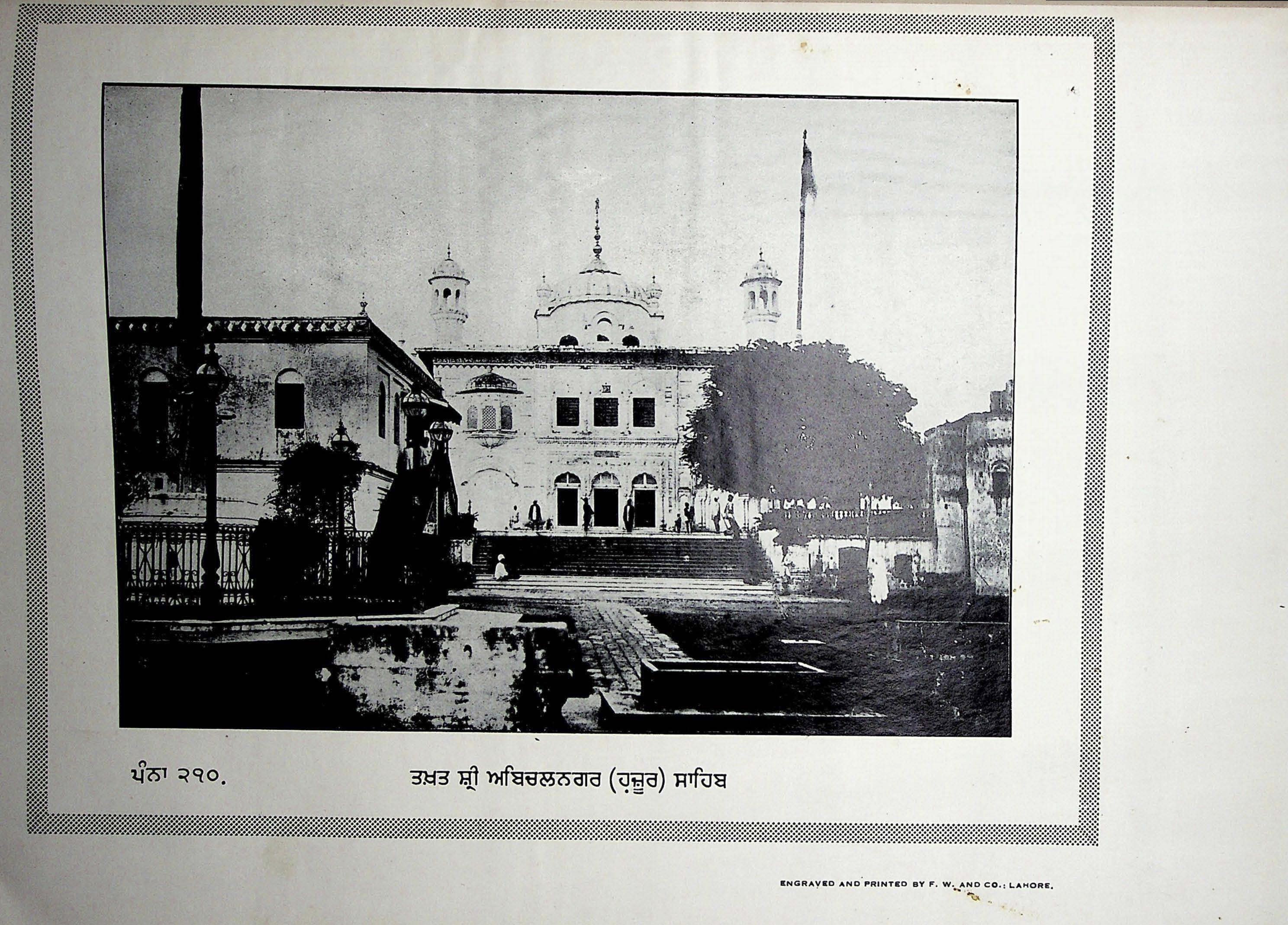
Photograph of Takht Hazur Sahib, ca.1880.

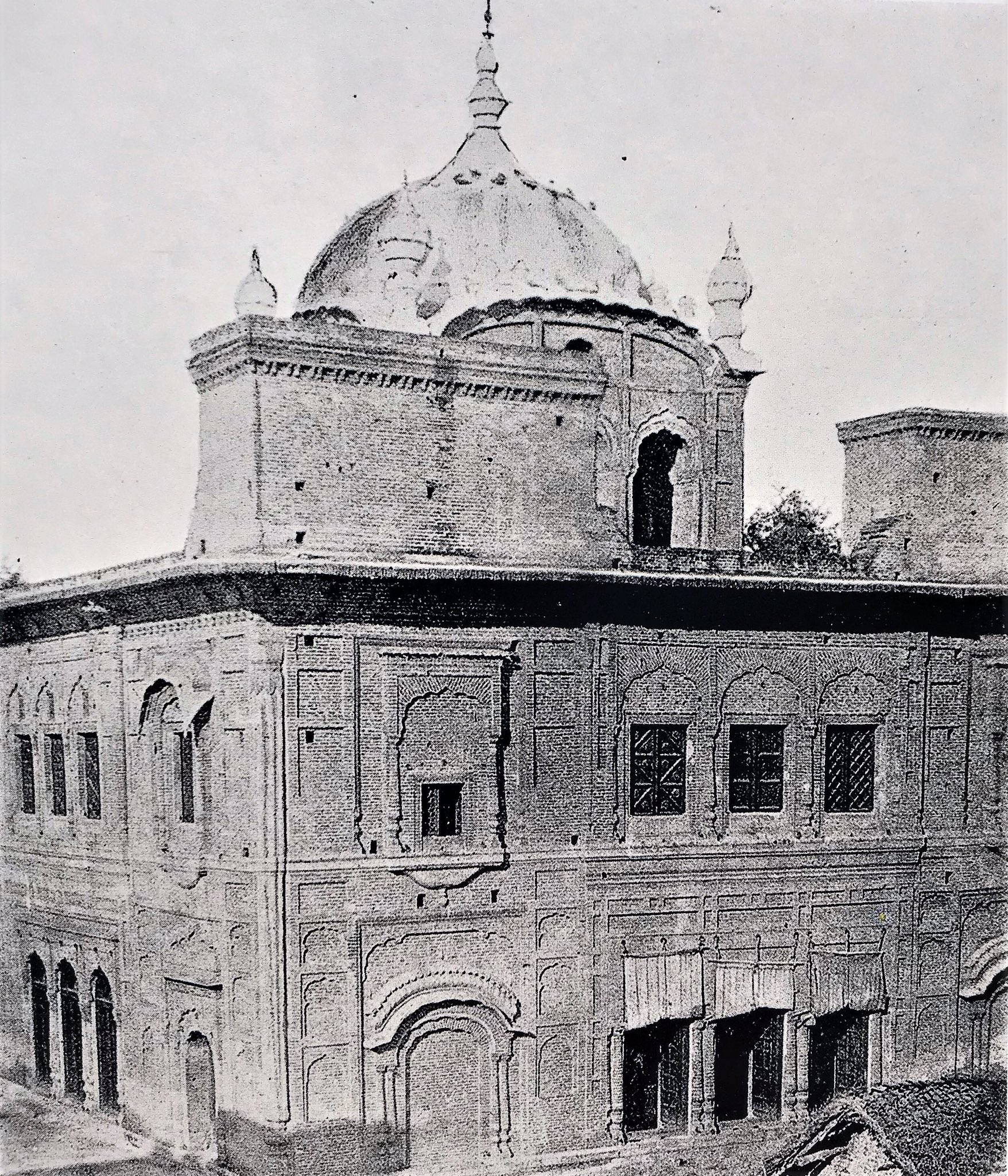
Historical photograph of Sri Hazur Sahib, Nanded in 1895

== See also ==
- Tourism in Marathwada
