= Turabul Haq Dargah =

Tomb of a Sufi saint in India

Turabul Haq Sahab Dargah
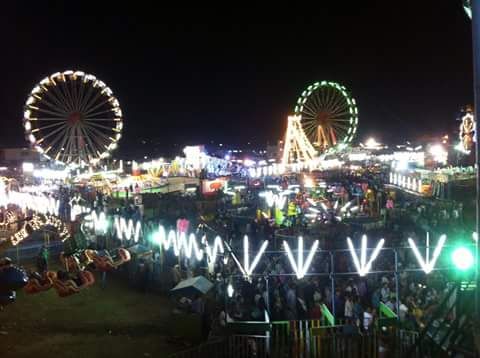
- Annual Parbhani Dargah Festival during night

Religion
- District: Parbhani district

Location
- State: Maharashtra
- Country: India
- Interactive map of Turabul Haq Sahab Dargah
- Coordinates: 19.27°N 76.78°E

Turabul Haq Dargah, is a tomb of the Sufi saint Turabul Haq, also known as Turatpeer Baba who spent most of his last days in Parbhani.

== About ==
Dargah is best known for its annual fair, which has history of 108 years, thousands of followers of all religions and faiths gather together between 2 February to 15 February each year. In Parbhani this dargah is the symbol of unity between all religions. People from across the state visits the dargah.

Thousands of followers of dargah claim that their wish got fulfilled after visiting this dargah. Because of huge popularity of dargah in Maharashtra state, it is often called as "Ajmer Sharif of Maharashtra". Thousands of diseased persons visit this dargah in the hope of healthy life. It is estimated that nearly 5 lakh (half million) people visited dargah during 2015 festival season between 2 February to 15 February.

== Transport ==
Parbhani is in Marathwada region of Maharashtra, about 550 kilometres (340 mi) away from Mumbai, 200 kilometres (120 mi) away from Aurangabad and 345 kilometres (214 mi) from Hyderabad. Parbhani is well connected by roads and trains to cities like Mumbai, Bangalore, Hyderabad, Amritsar, Bhopal, New Delhi, Nagpur, Pune.
Nearest airport is to Parbhani is Aurangabad Airport and Nanded Airport.

== Gallery ==
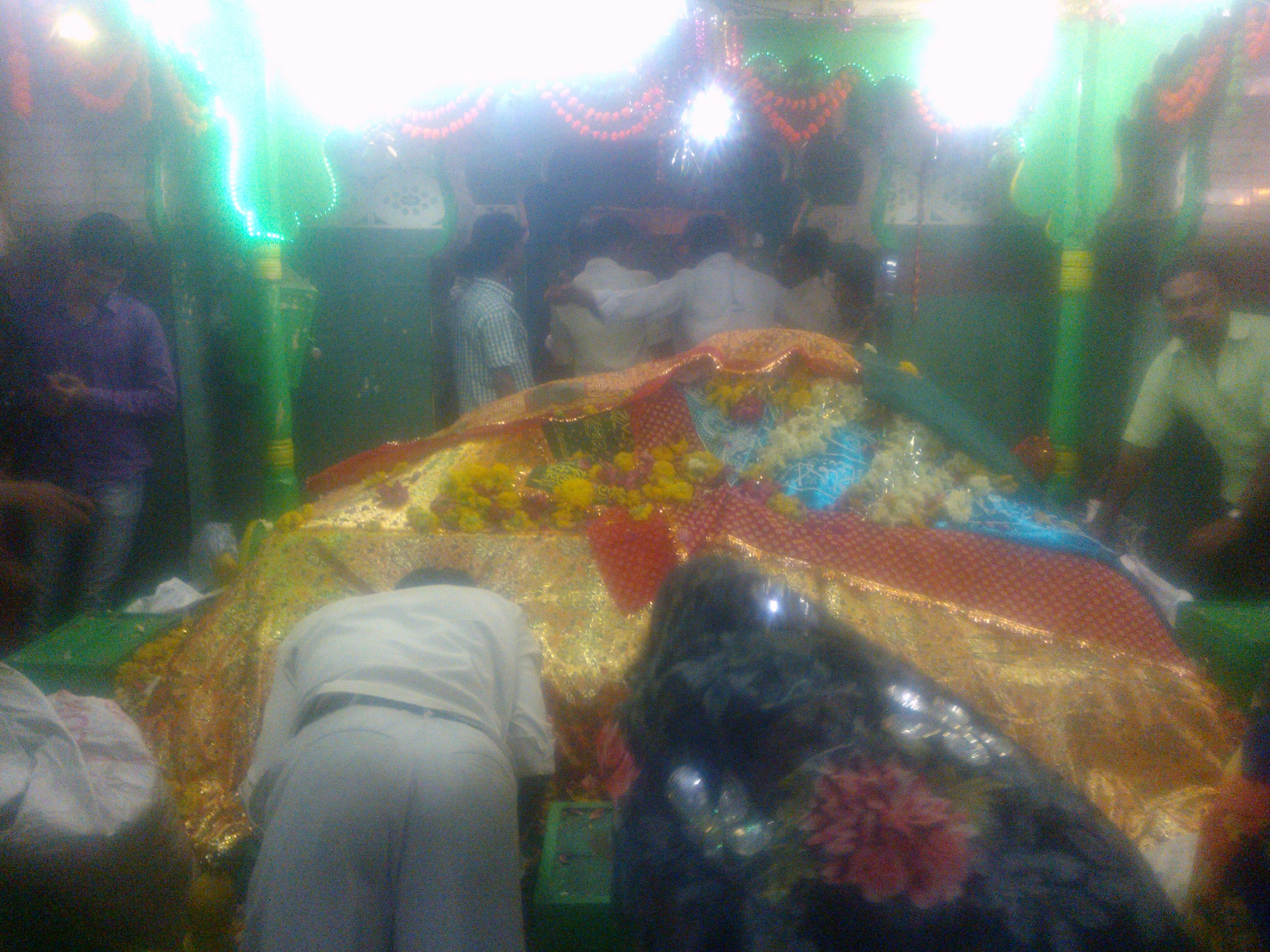
Shrine of Turabul Haq

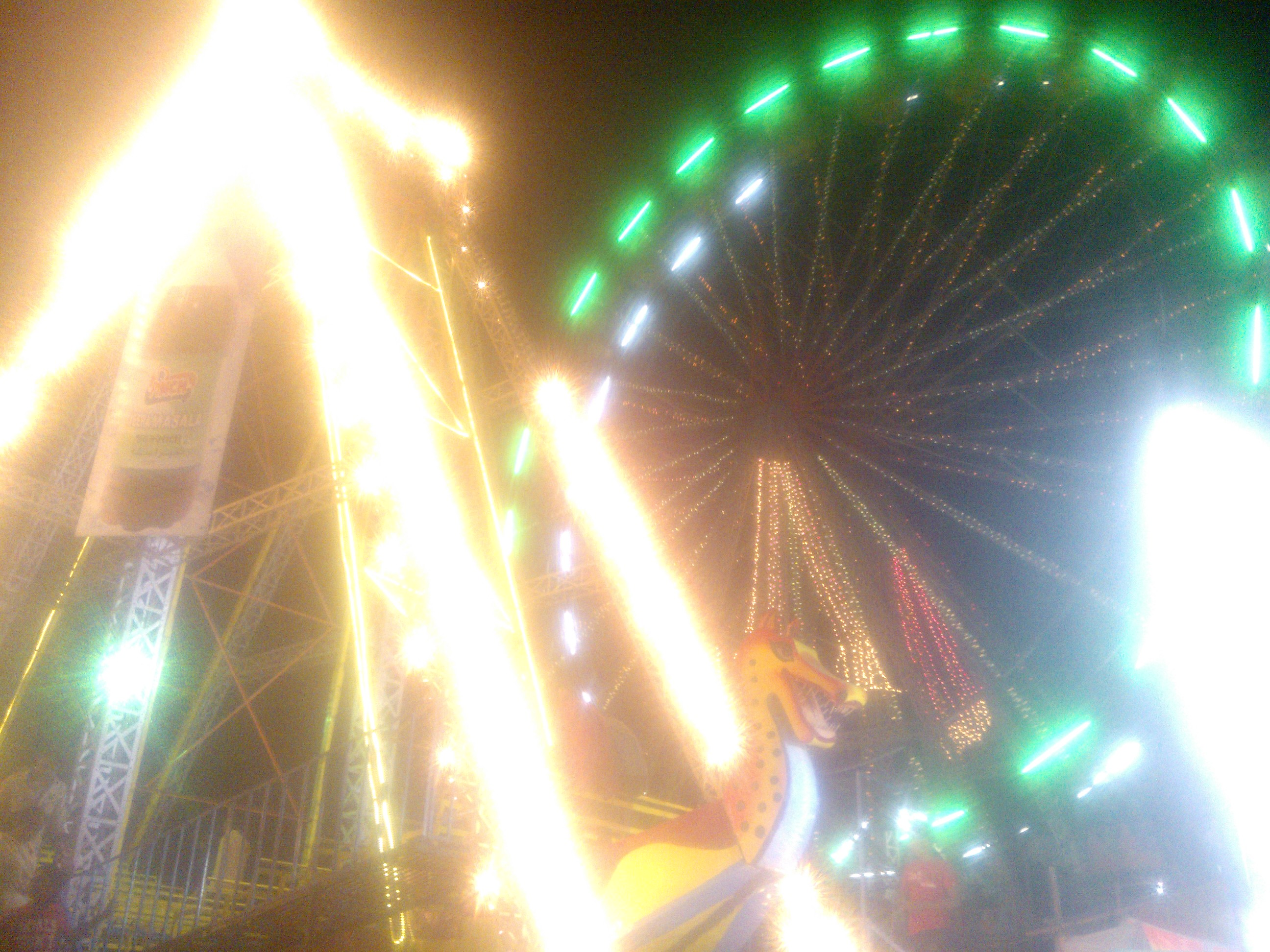
Joy rides at the fair

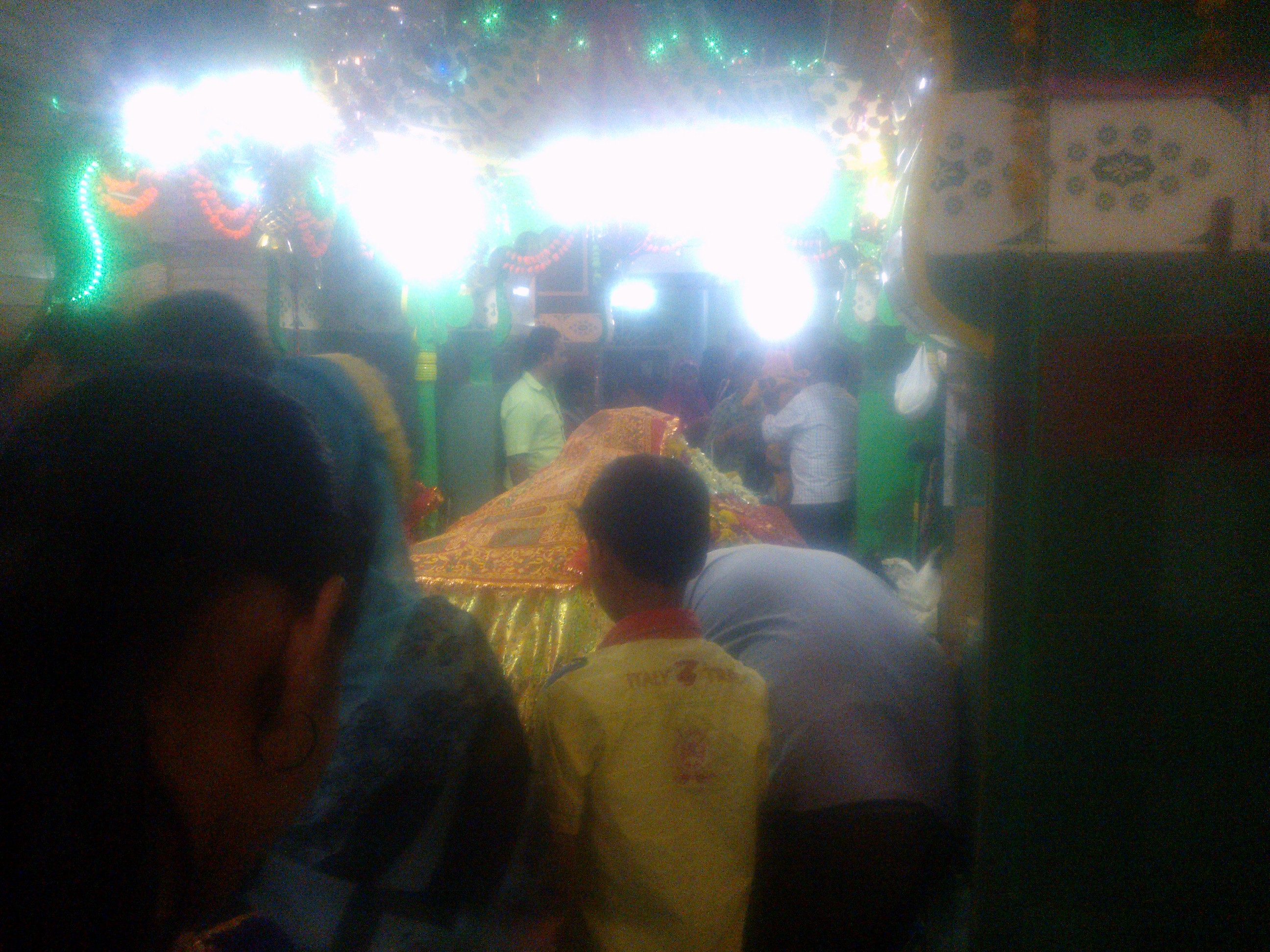
People waiting for their turn to see the shrine.

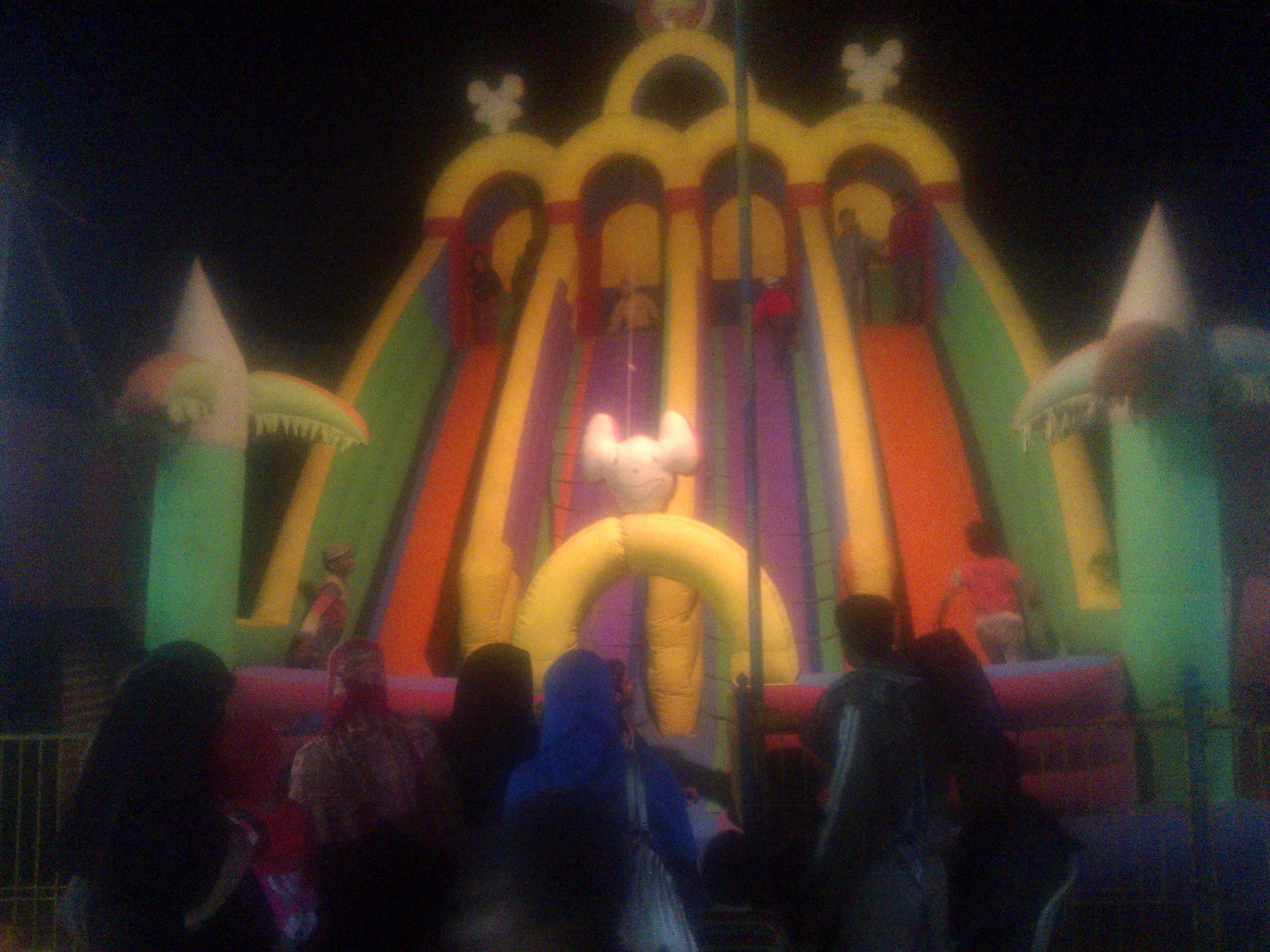
Kids enjoying in festival.

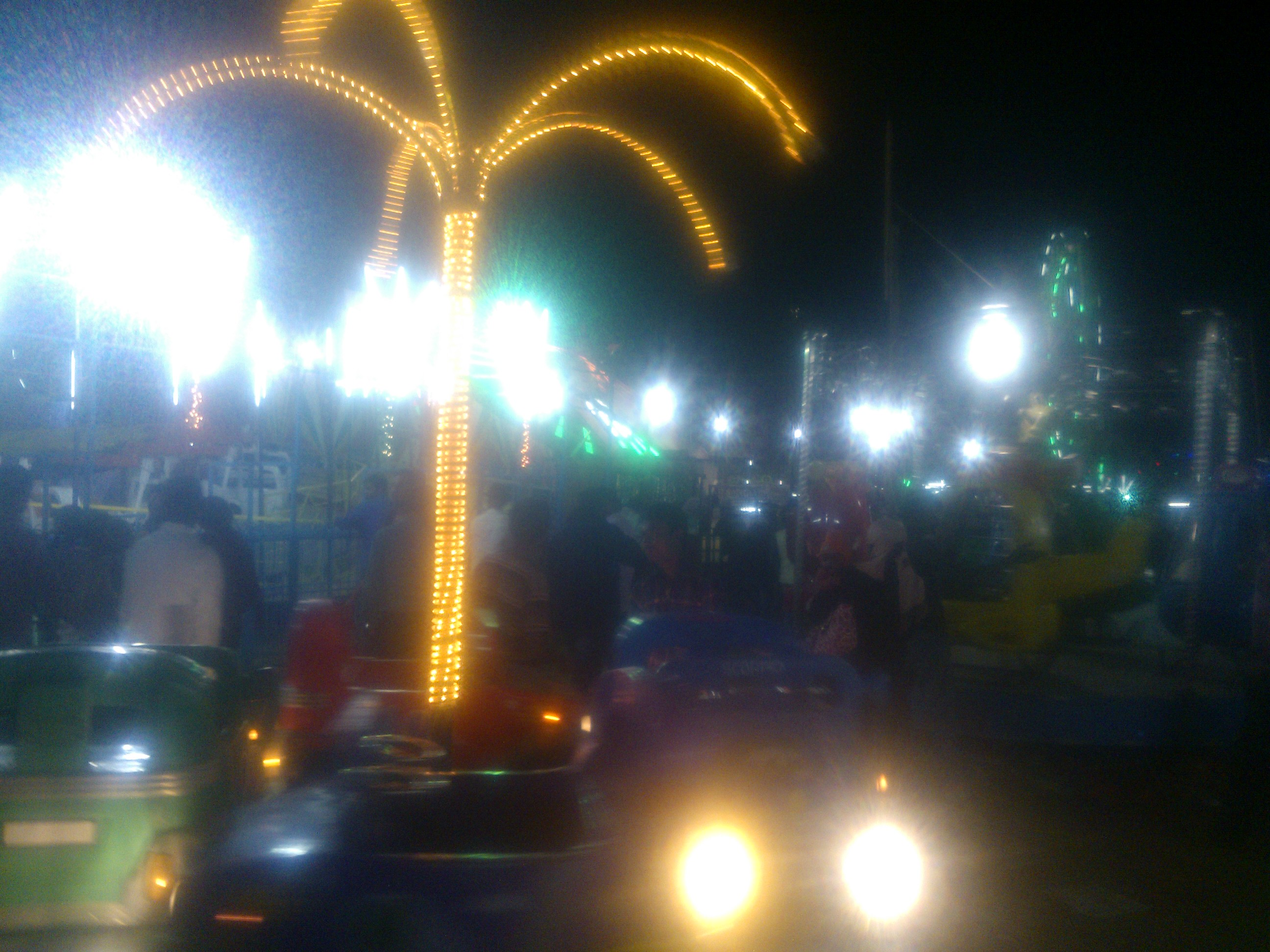
Still from the fair

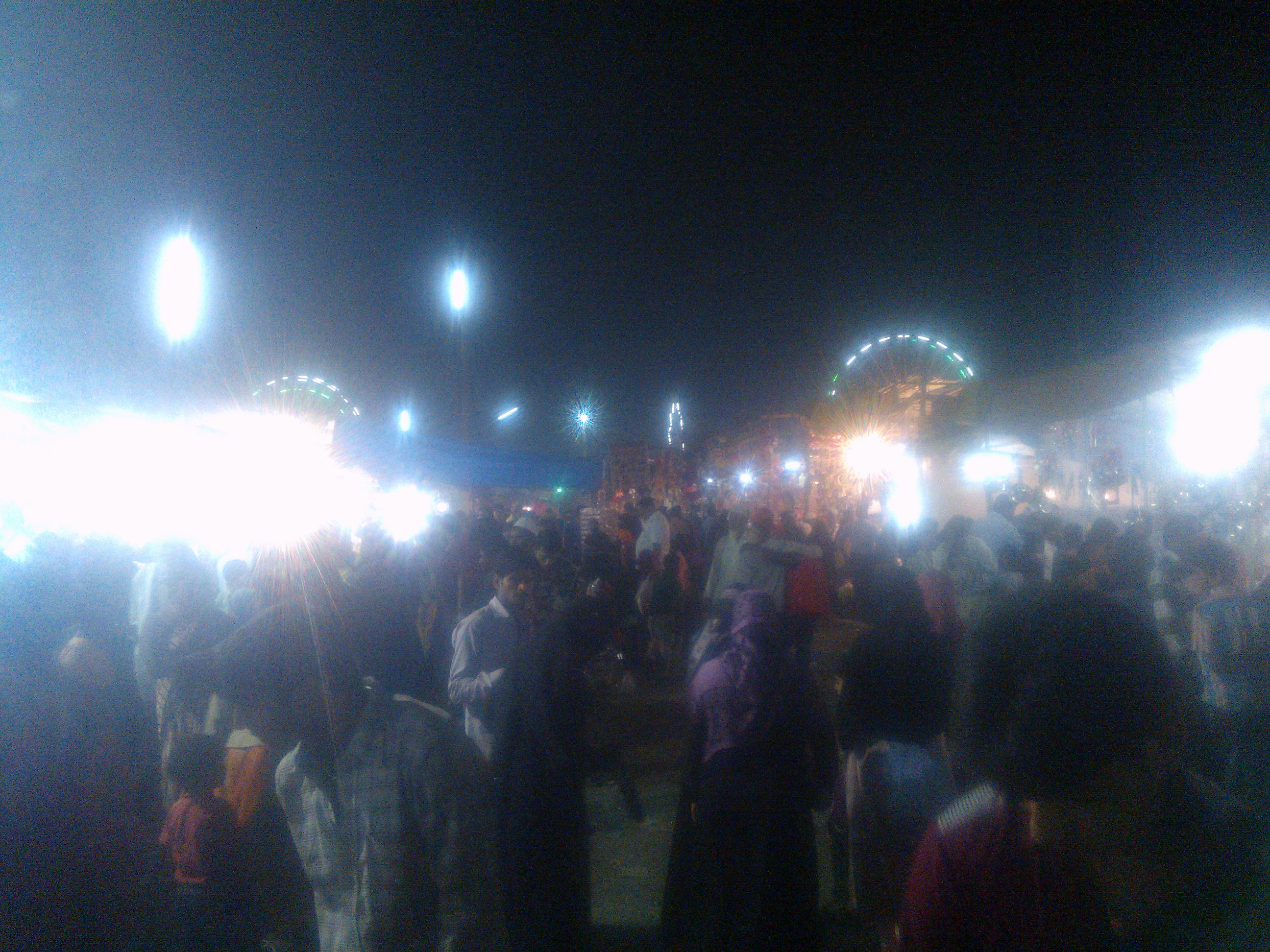
Crowd during the fair

== See also ==
- Ajmer Sharif Dargah
- Ashrafpur Kichhauchha
- Tourism in Marathwada
