= Sri Sai Janmasthan Temple, Pathri =

Temple in Pathri, India

- Location in Maharashtra, India

Religion
- Affiliation: Hinduism
- District: Parbhani
- Deity: Sai baba of Shirdi

Location
- Location: Pathri
- State: Maharashtra
- Country: India
- Interactive map of Sri Sai Janmasthan Temple, Pathri
- Coordinates: 19.25°N 76.45°E

Architecture
- Established: 1999

Website
- Official Website

Sri Sai Janmasthan Temple (Sai Baba Birth Temple) is a temple in Pathri city of Parbhani district of Maharashtra, India. It has been claimed that Pathri is the real birthplace of Sai Baba, which has been subject to controversy.

== History ==
In 1970s, a field research claimed that Shri Sai Baba was born in Pathri village. Sri Sai Smarak Samiti (Sai Memorial committee) was then formed in Pathri. A committee purchased land for temple on site of Sai Baba's house and construction of the temple was started in 1994. In 1999 the temple was inaugurated to the public.

== See also ==
- Sai Baba of Shirdi
