= Memorial =

Area or object which serves as a focus for memory or commemoration

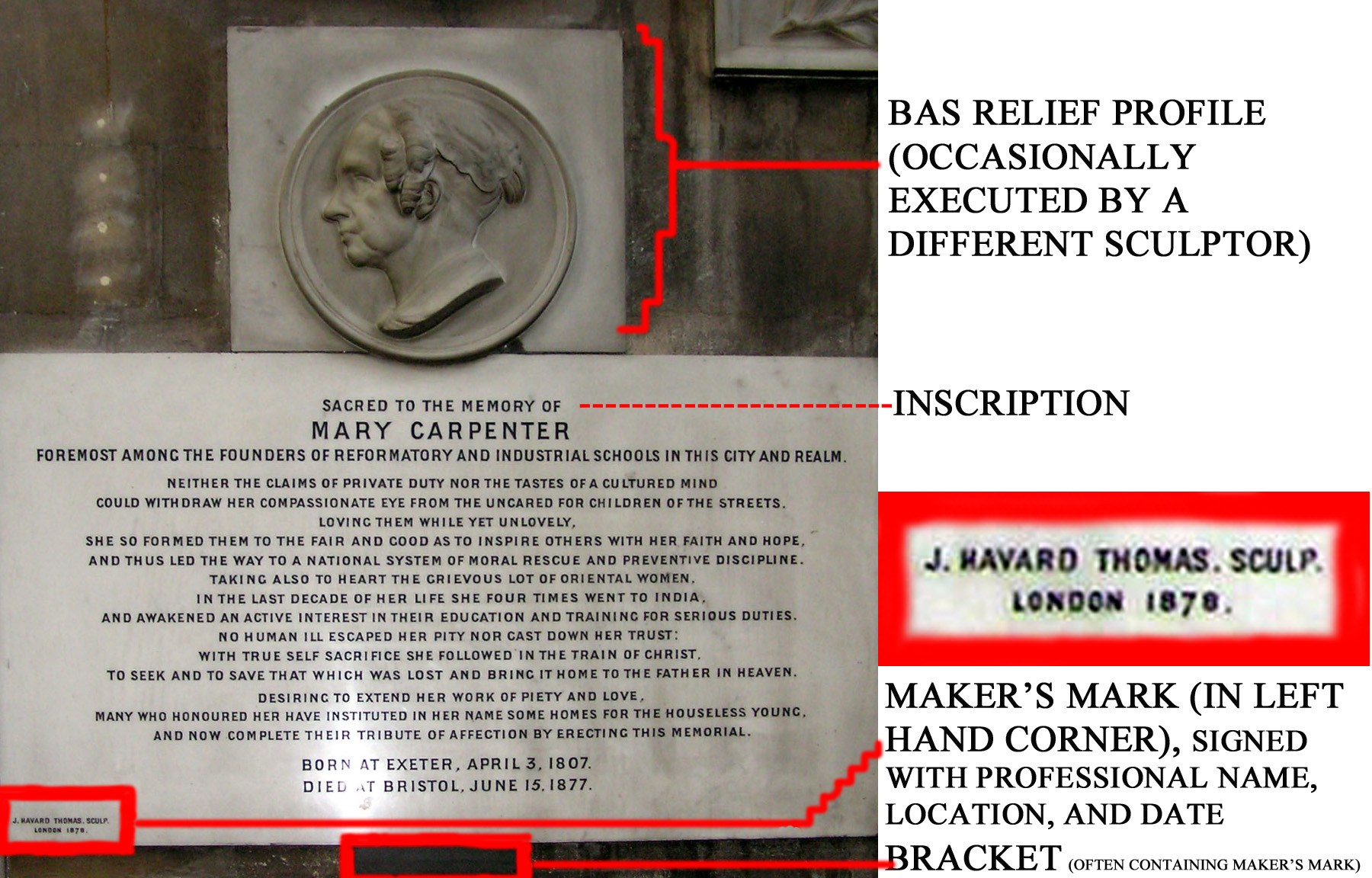
A wall-mounted memorial to Mary Carpenter in Bristol Cathedral.

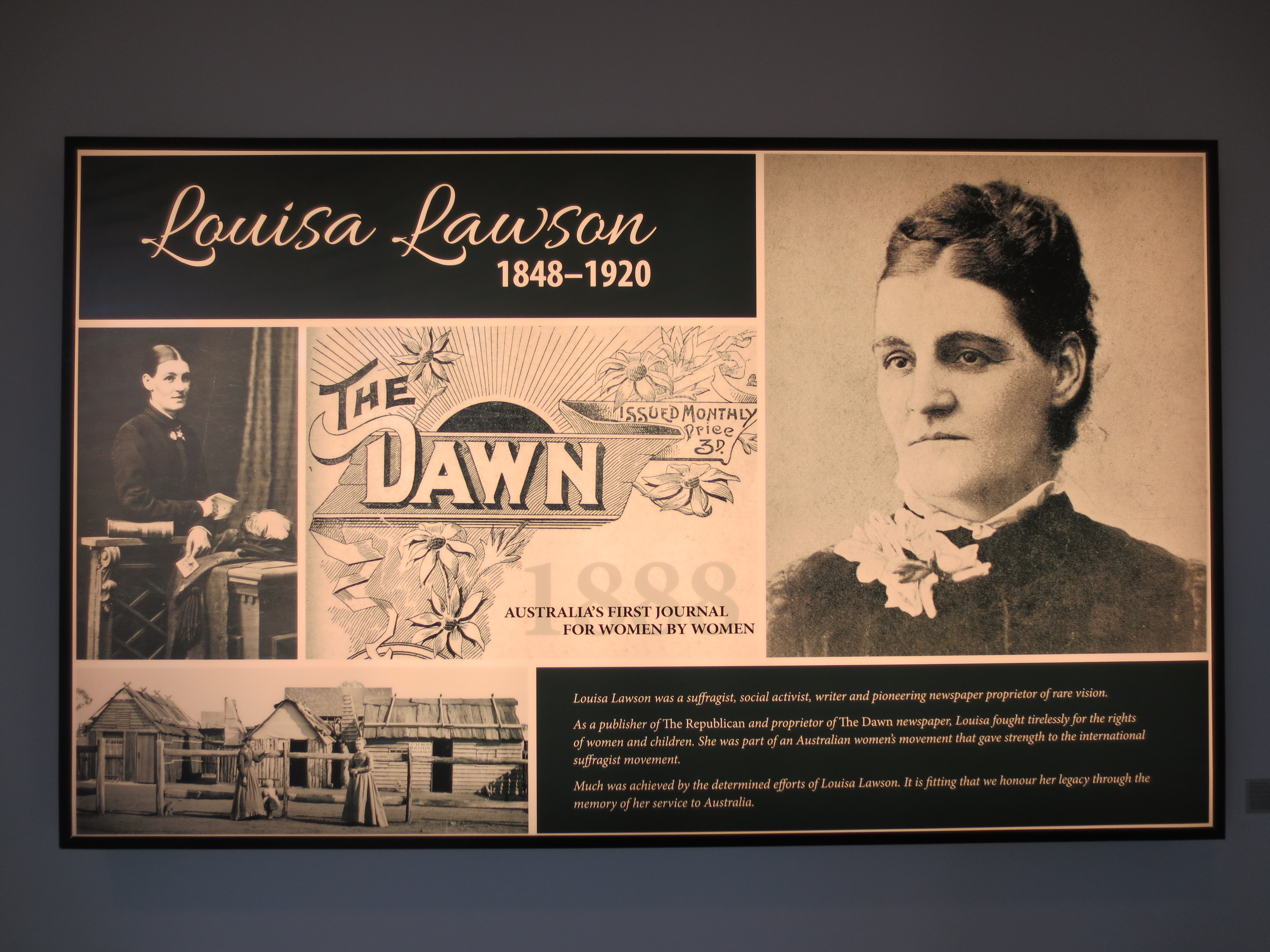
Lightbox used as a memorial.

A memorial is an object or place which serves as a focus for the memory or the commemoration of something, usually an influential, deceased person or a historical, tragic event. Popular forms of memorials include landmark objects such as homes or other sites, or works of art such as sculptures, statues, fountains or parks. Larger memorials may be known as monuments.

== Types ==
The most common type of memorial is the gravestone or the memorial plaque. Also common are war memorials commemorating those who have died in wars. Memorials in the form of a cross are called intending crosses.

Online memorials are often created on websites and social media to allow digital access as an alternative to physical memorials which may not be feasible or easily accessible.

When somebody has died, the family may request that a memorial gift (usually money) be given to a designated charity, or that a tree be planted in memory of the person. Those temporary or makeshift memorials are also called grassroots memorials.

Sometimes, when a student has died, the memorials are placed in the form of a scholarship, to be awarded to high-achieving students in future years.

Memorials to persons or events of major significance may be designated as national memorials.

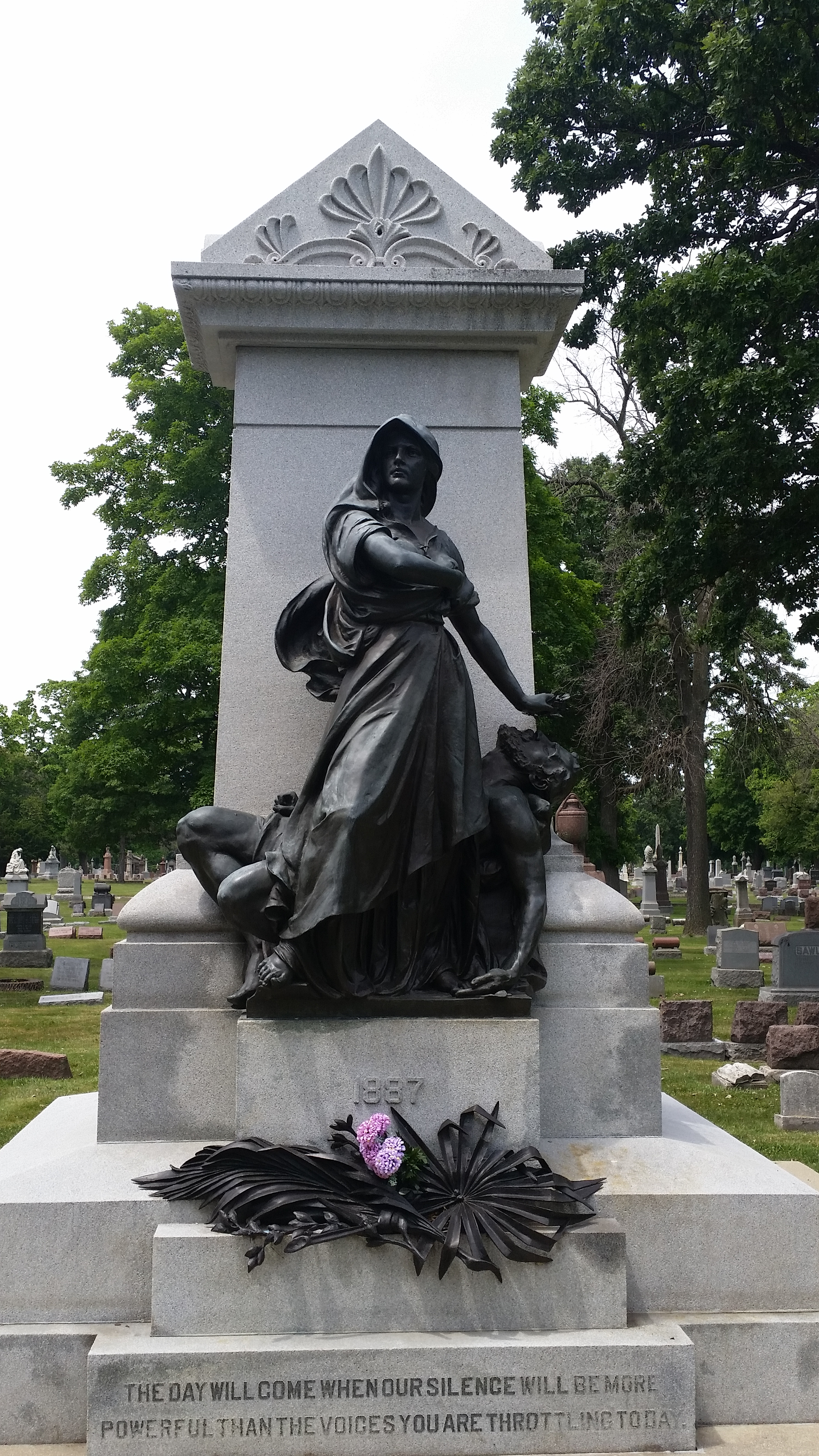
The Haymarket Martyrs' Monument at the Forest Home Cemetery in Forest Park, Illinois

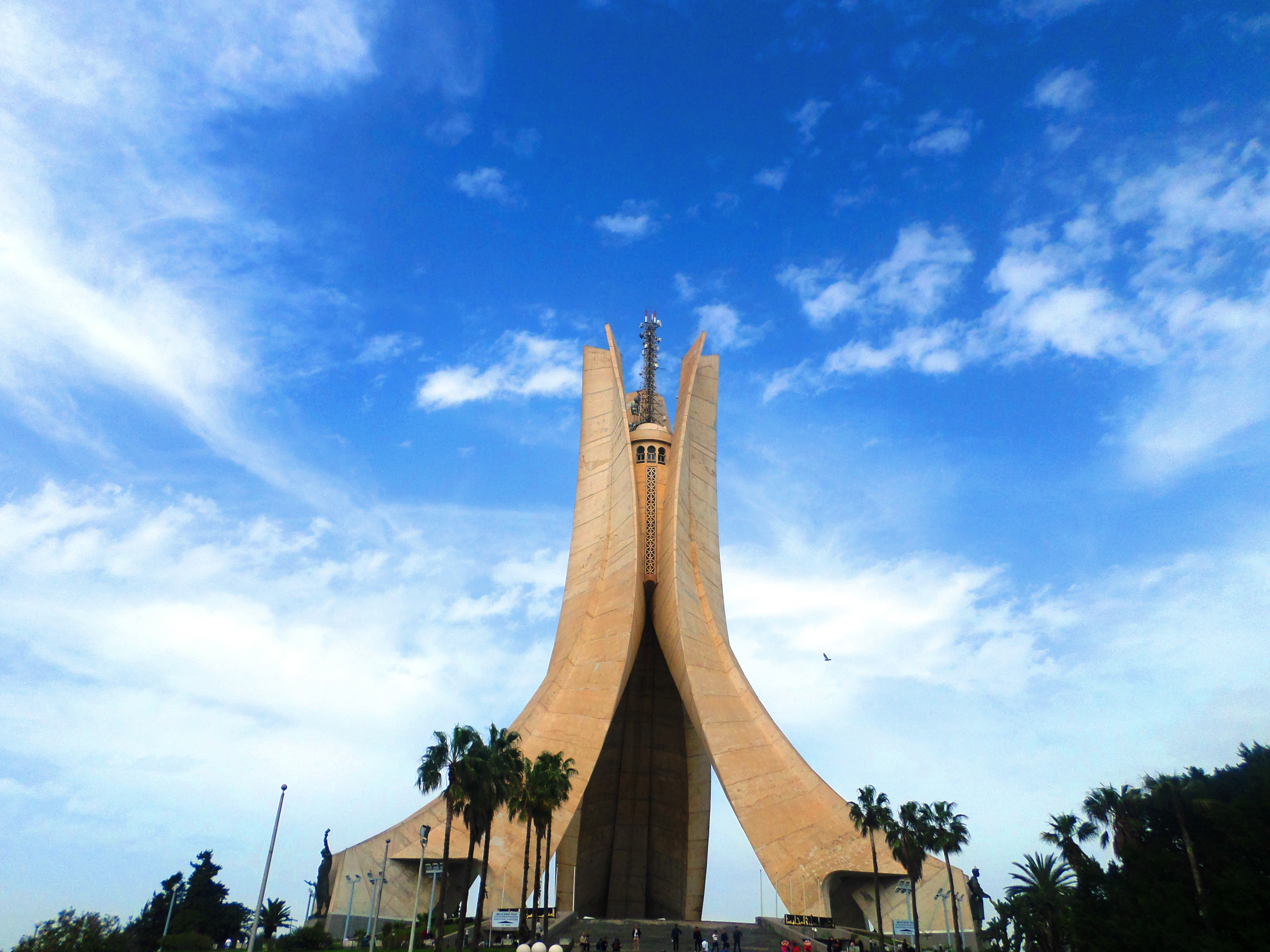
Maqam Echahid in Algiers, Algeria

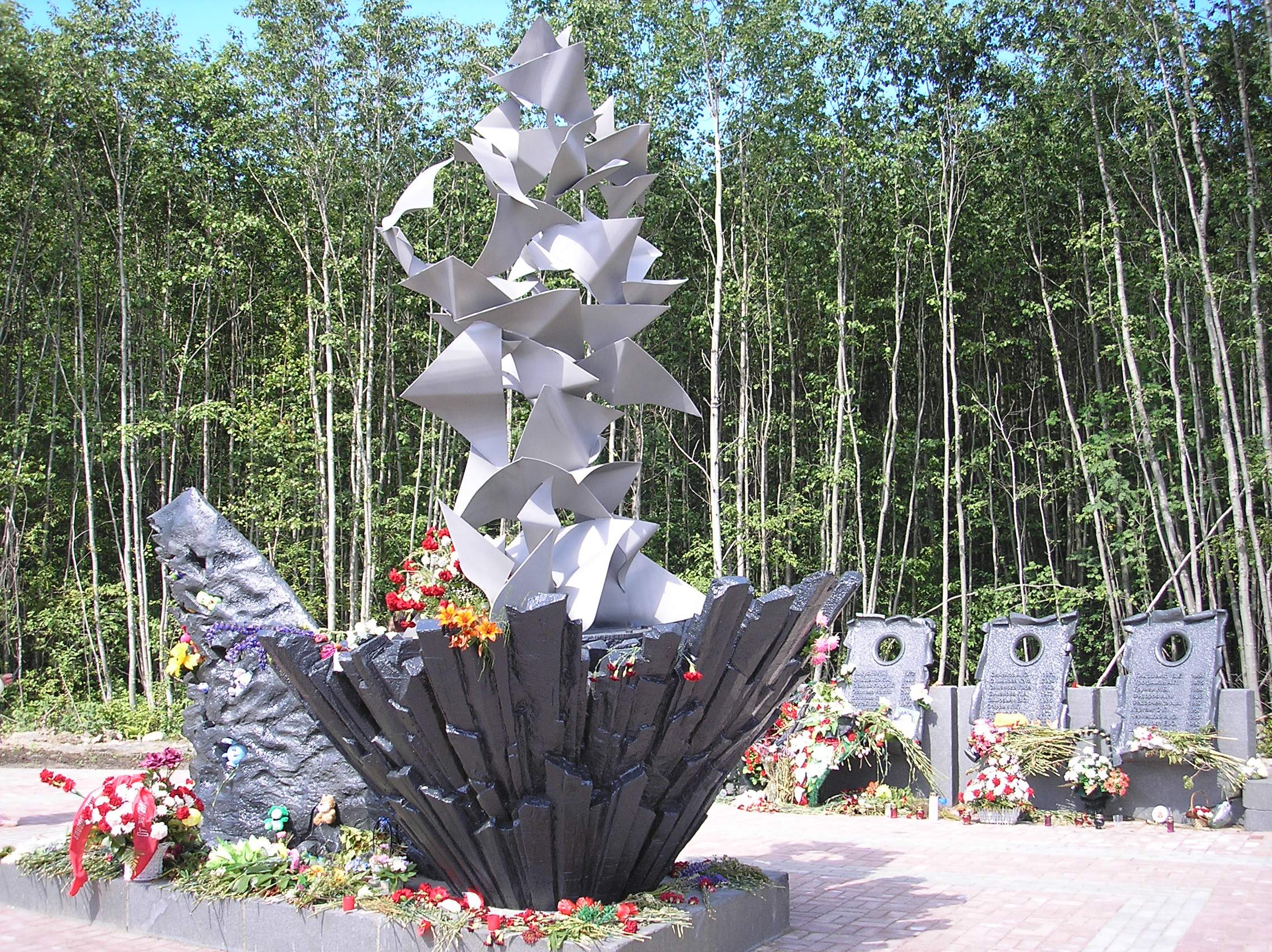
The memorial monument of the 2011 airport disaster in Petrozavodsk, Republic of Karelia

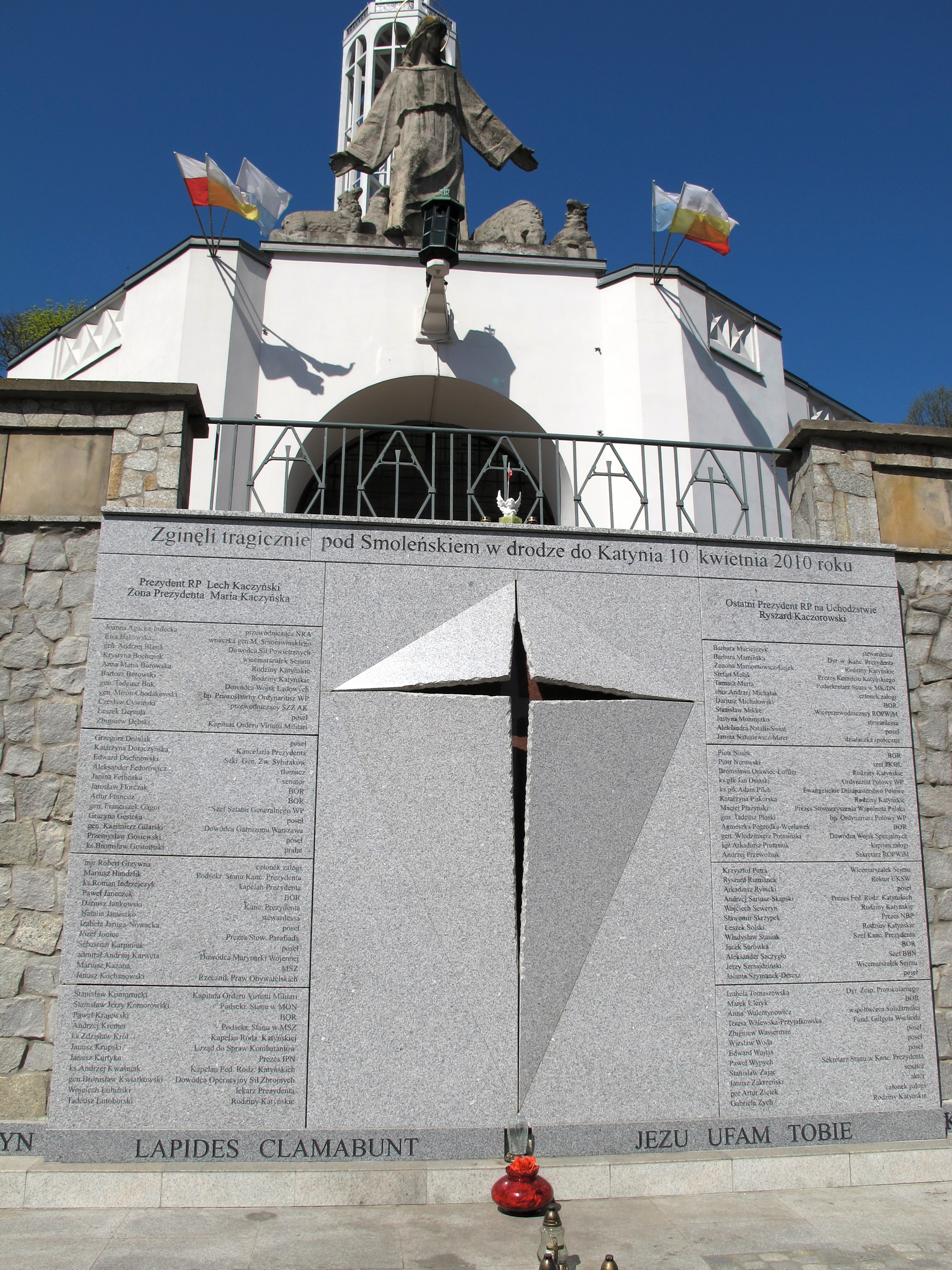
Memorial dedicated to the victims of the 2010 Polish Air Force Tu-154 crash in Smoleńsk at the Church of St. Roch in Białystok, Poland

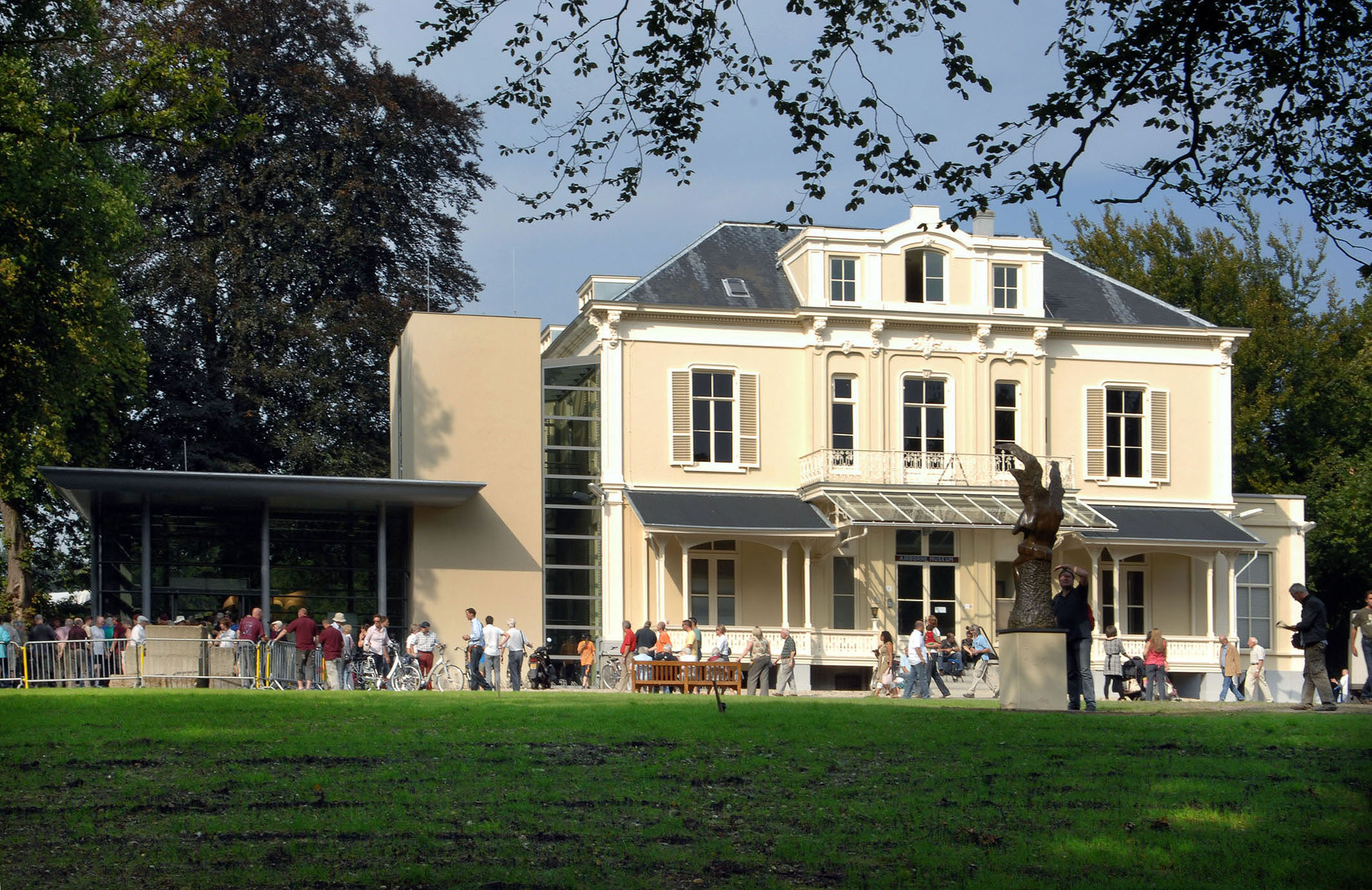
The Airborne Museum in Arnhem, Netherlands commemorates the liberation of the city during World War II

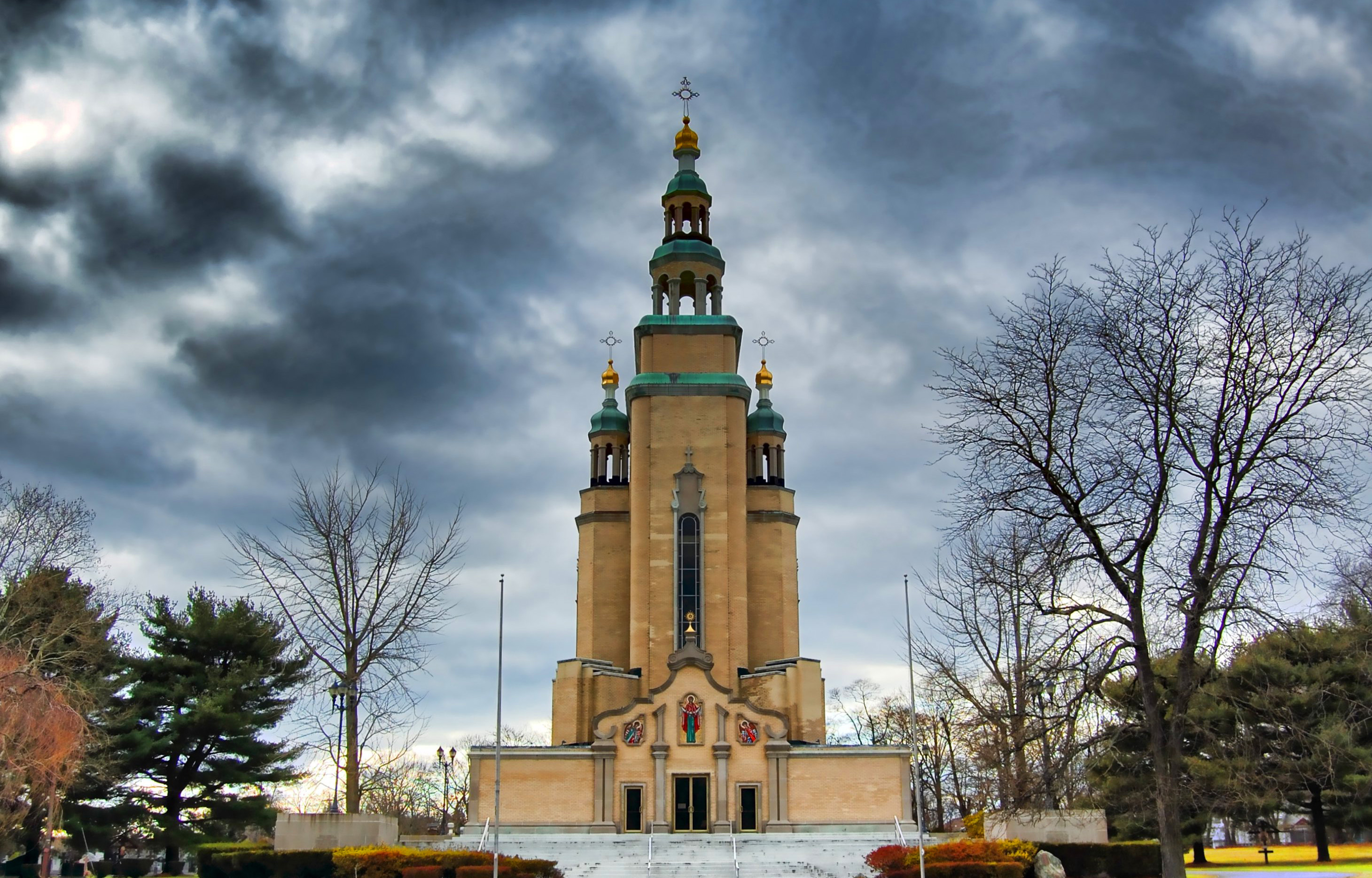
St. Andrew Memorial Church in South Bound Brook, New Jersey, was built in 1965 to commemorate the victims of the Holodomor

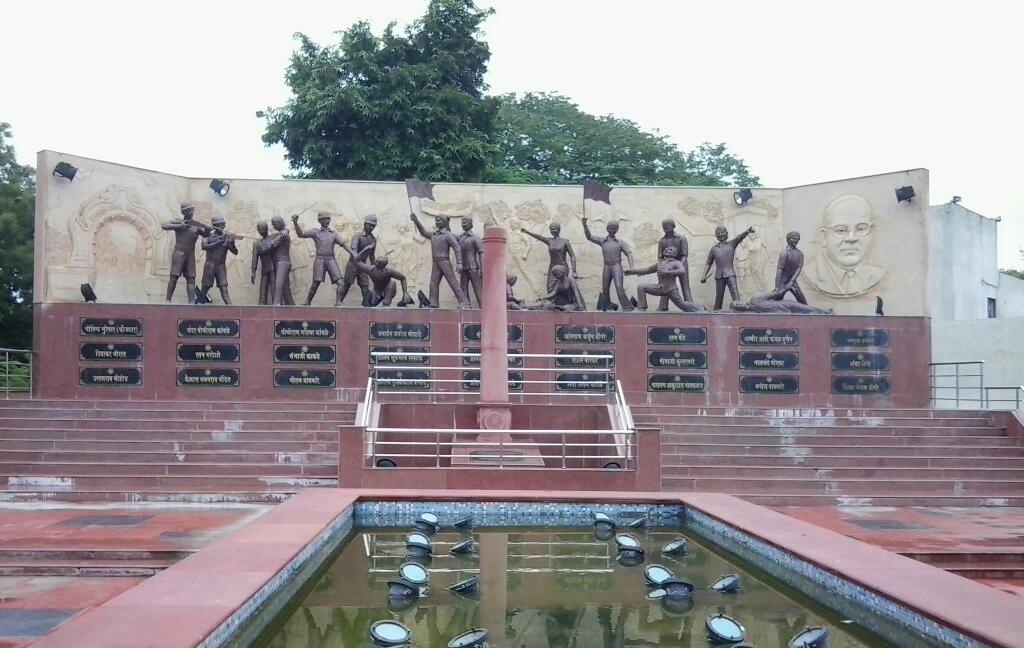
Namantar Shahid Smarak commemorates the Namantar Andolan

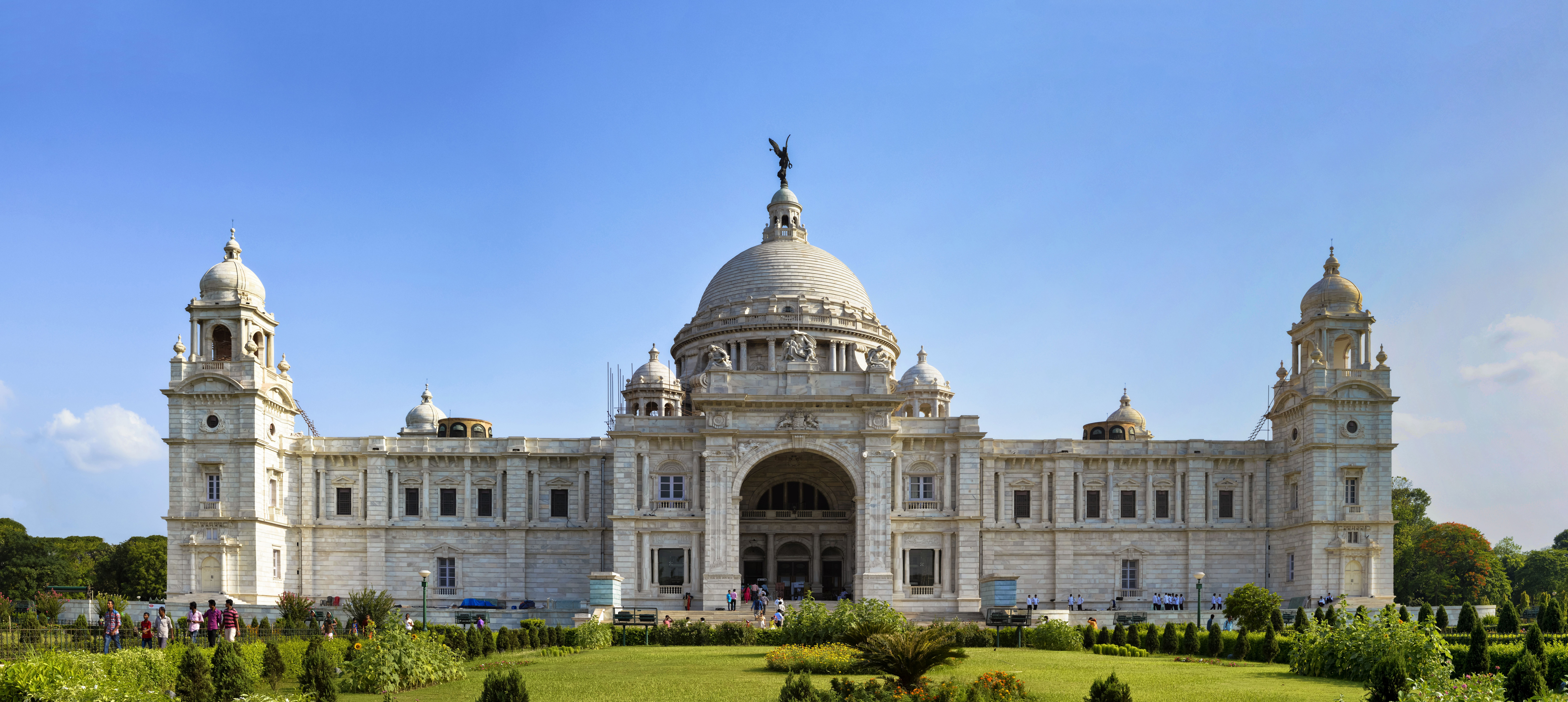
The Victoria Memorial of Kolkata is an important monument of India

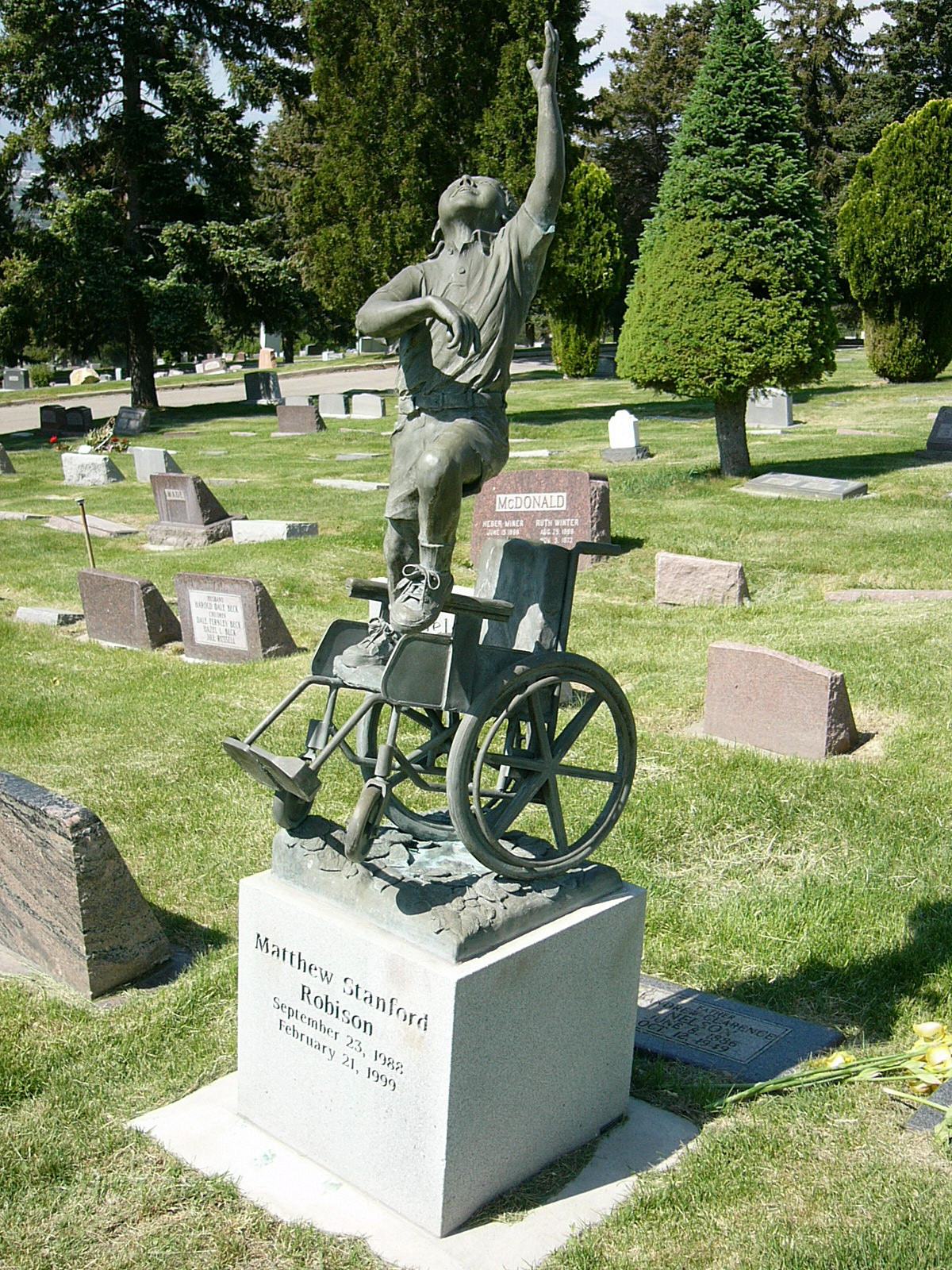
The grave memorial for a ten year old disabled boy; Matthew Stanford Robison. Salt Lake City Cemetery Utah.

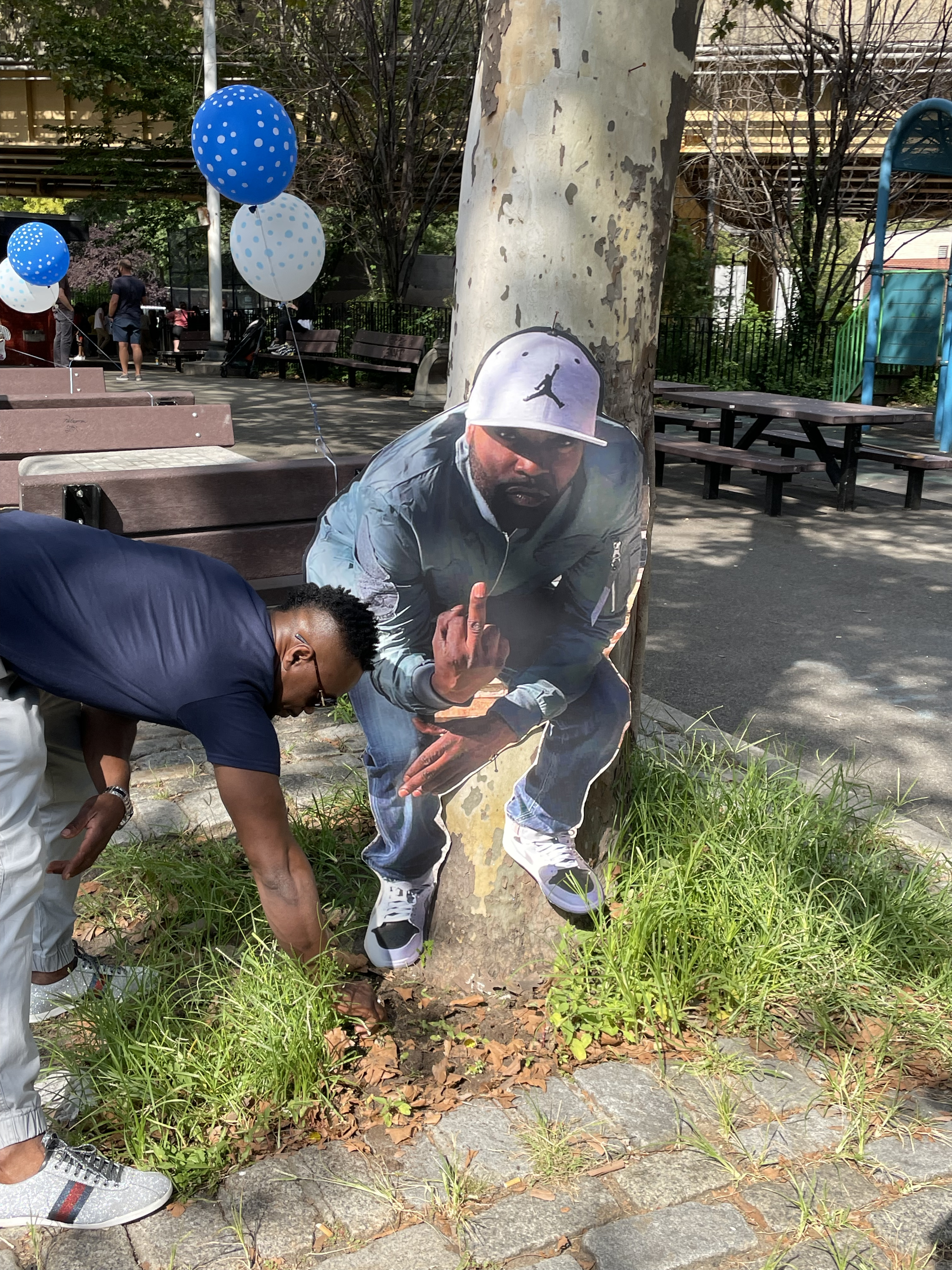
Homemade memorial in Brooklyn, NYC featuring a photo cut-out of the deceased giving the middle-finger

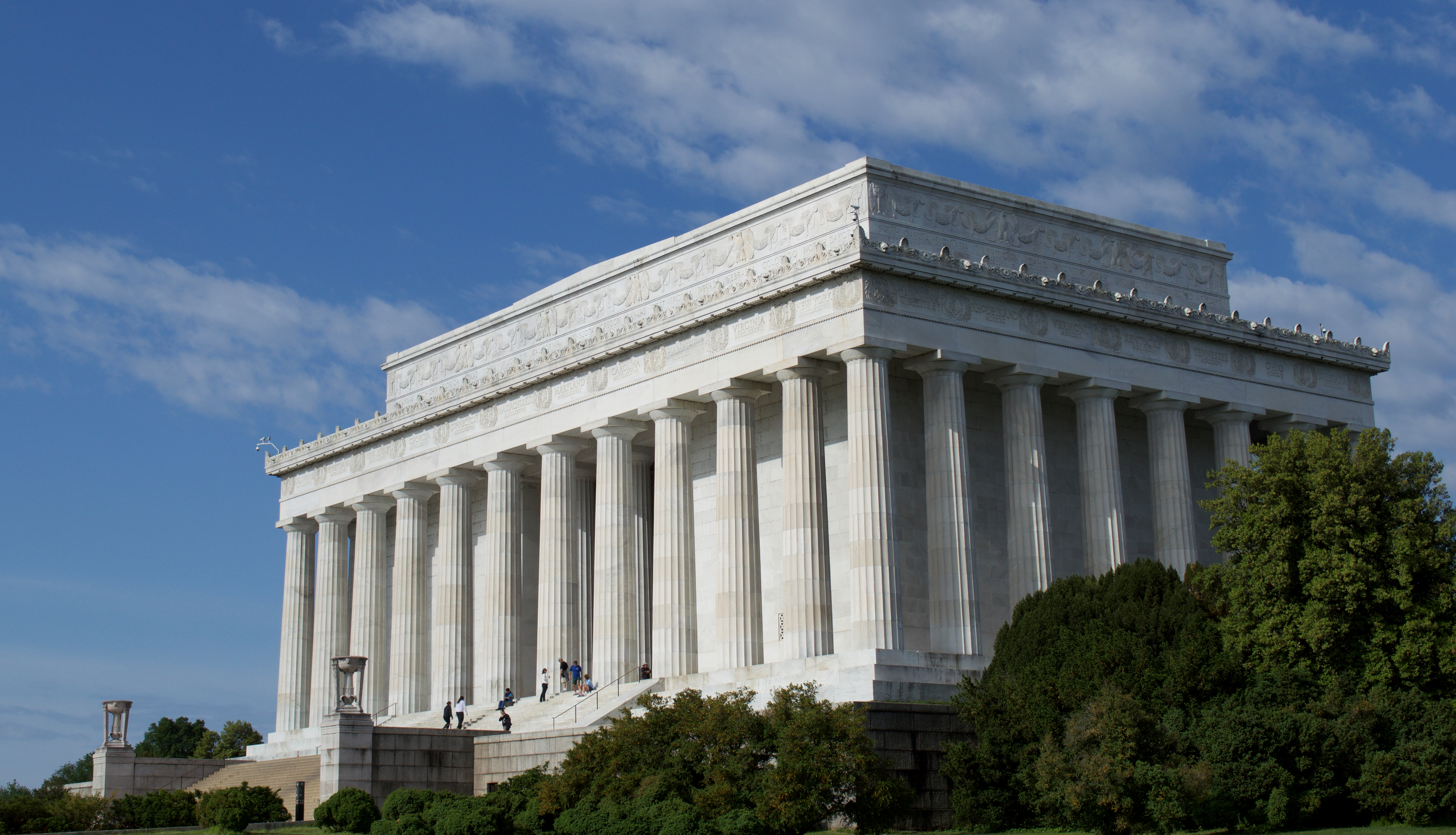
Lincoln Memorial in Washington, D.C., United States.

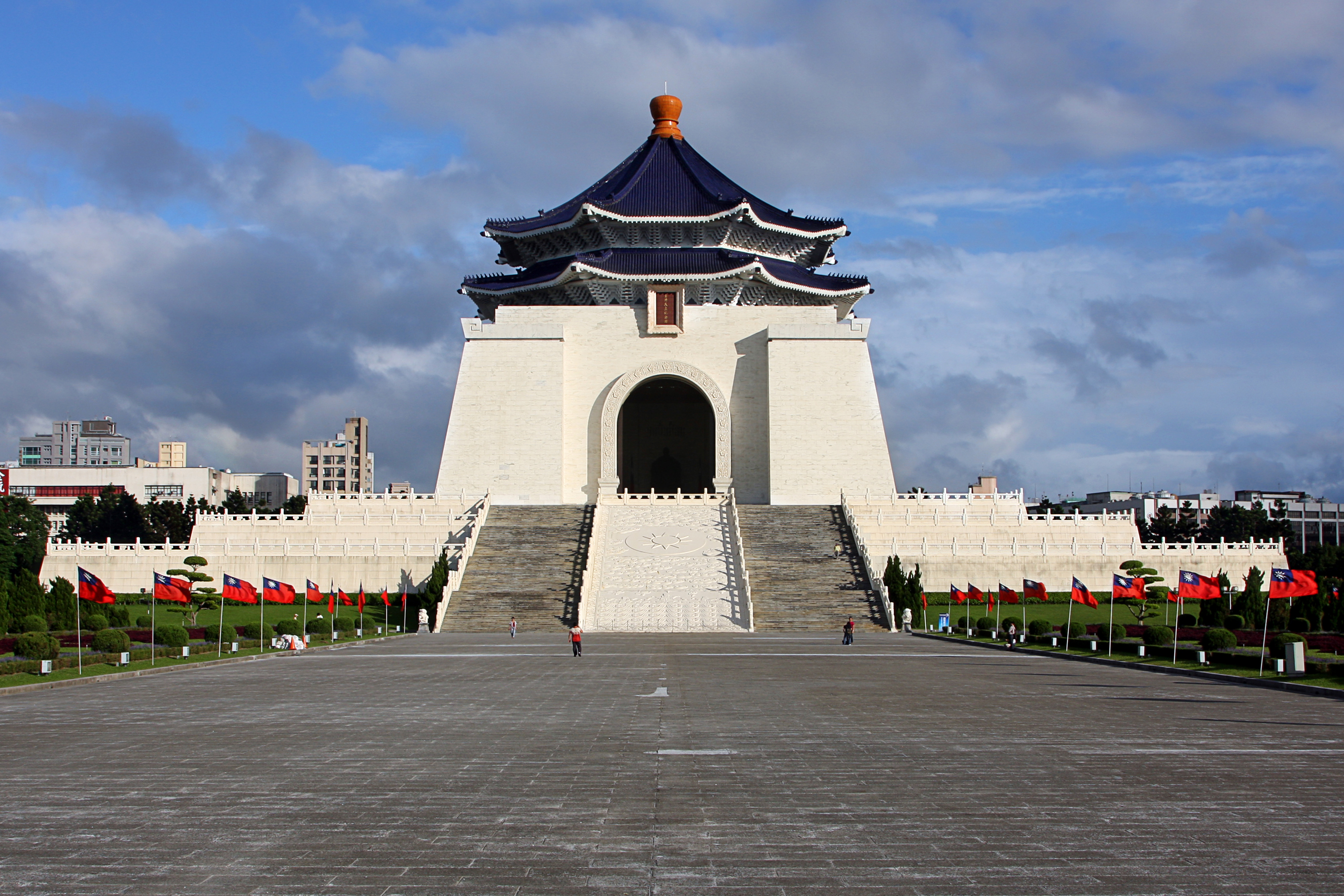
Chiang Kai-shek Memorial Hall in Taipei, Taiwan.

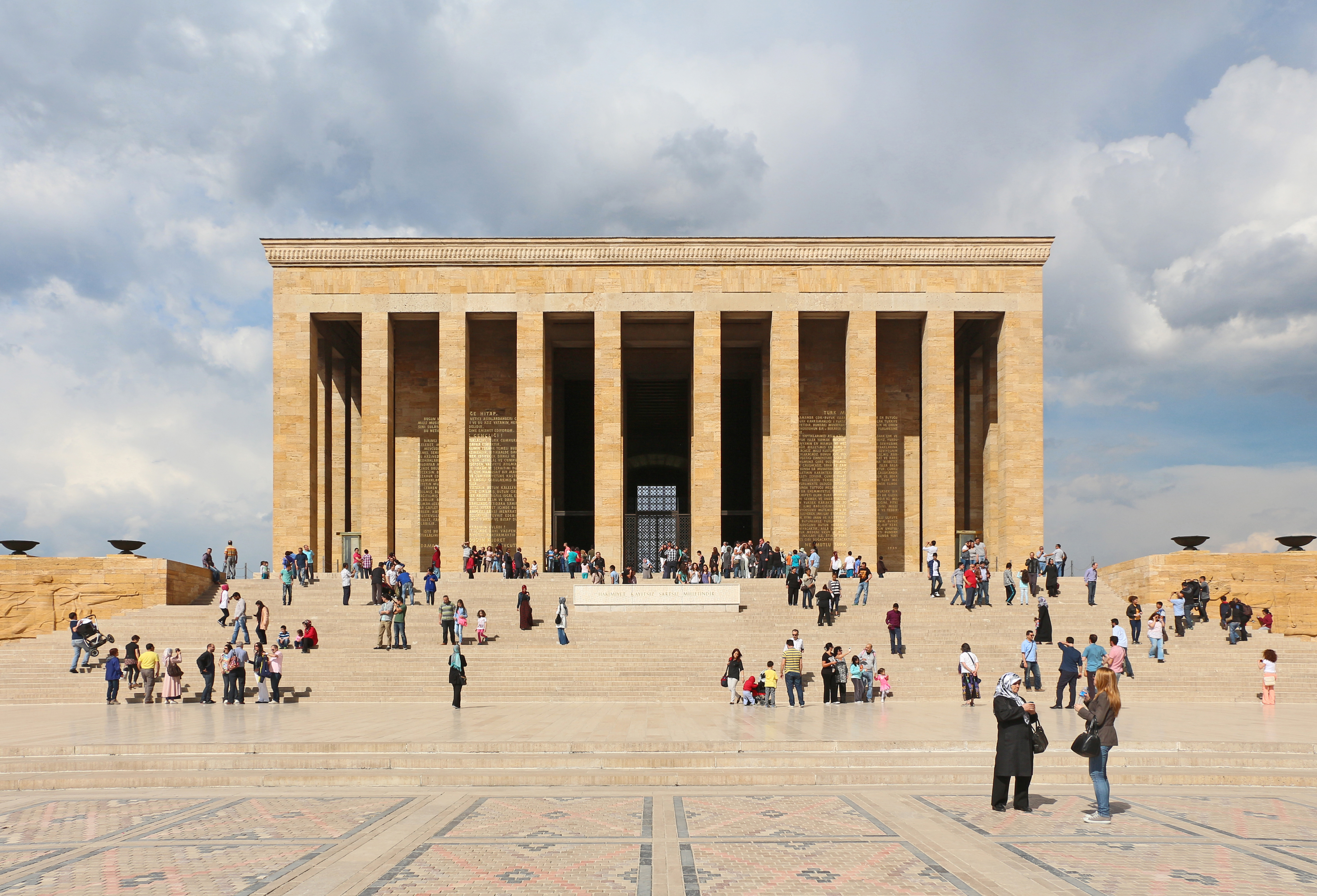
Anıtkabir in Ankara, Turkey.

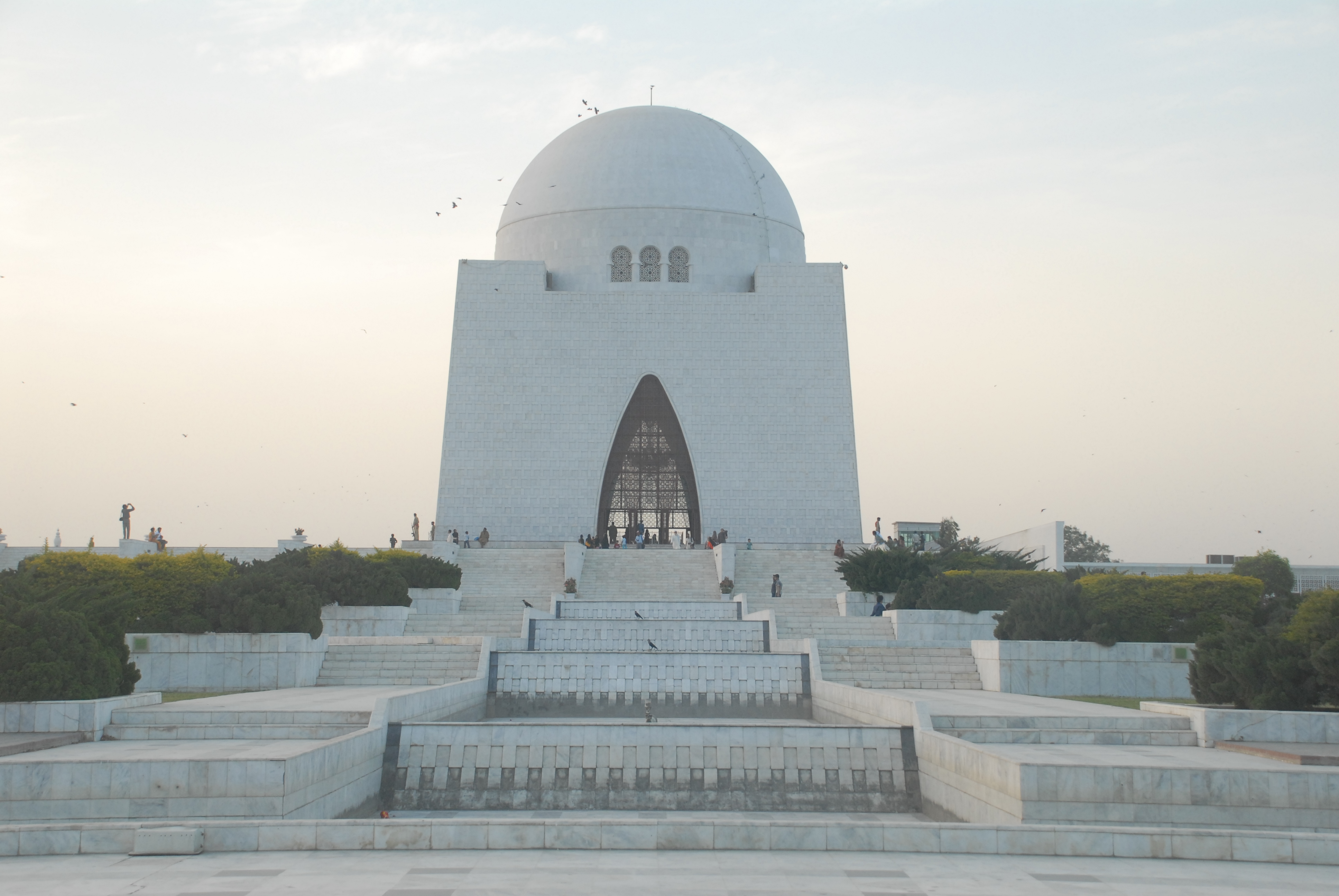
Mazar-e-Quaid in Karachi, Pakistan.

== See also ==
- Lists of monuments and memorials
- Ghost bike
- Historical marker
- Memorial bench
- Memorialization
- National monument
- Public history
- Roadside memorial
- Tomb of the Unknown Soldier
- War memorial
- Culture of Remembrance
- Skull Tower
