= Sanjay Bansode =

Indian politician

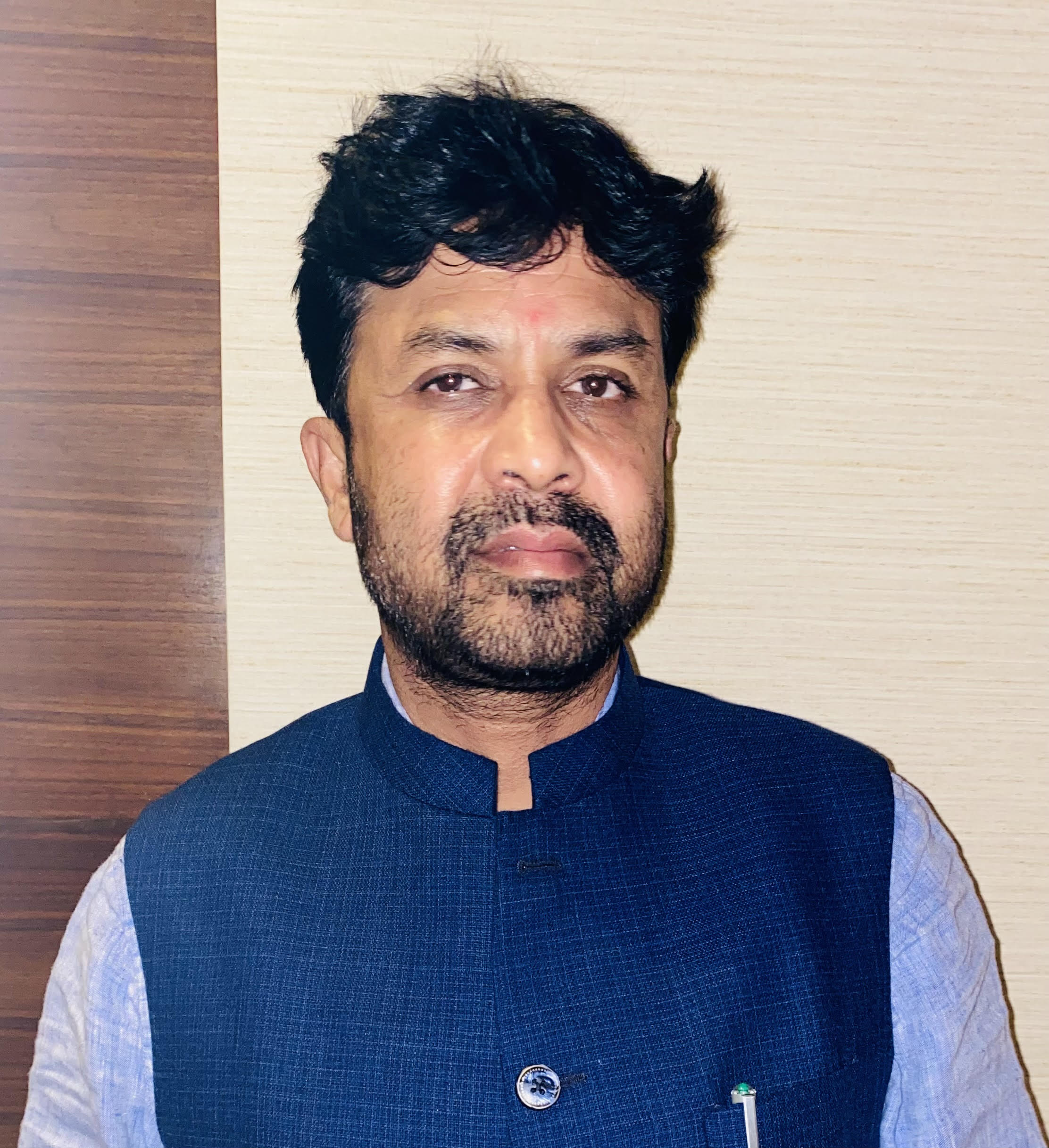
- Shri. Sanjay Bansode

Cabinet Minister Government of Maharashtra
- In office 14 July 2023 – 26 November 2024
- Minister: Sports and Youth Welfare; Ports Development
- Governor: Ramesh Bais; C. P. Radhakrishnan
- Cabinet: Eknath Shinde ministry
- Chief Minister: Eknath Shinde
- Deputy CM: Devendra Fadnavis (First); Ajit Pawar (Second)
- Guardian Minister: NA
- Preceded by: Girish Mahajan (Sports and Youth Welfare Ministry); Dadaji Bhuse (Ports Development Ministry)

Minister of State Government of Maharashtra
- In office 30 December 2019 – 29 June 2022
- Minister: Environment and climate change; Water Supply.; Sanitation; Public Works (Including Public Undertakings); Employment Guarantee; Earthquake Rehabilitation; Parliamentary Affairs.; Home Affairs (Rural) Additional charge on 27 June 2022; Woman and Child Development. Additional charge on 27 June 2022
- Governor: Bhagat Singh Koshyari
- Chief Minister: Uddhav Thackeray
- Deputy CM: Ajit Pawar

Member of the Maharashtra Legislative Assembly
- Incumbent
- Assumed office 27 November 2019
- Preceded by: Sudhakar Bhalerao
- Constituency: Udgir

Personal details
- Born: 31 December 1973 (age 52) Udgir, Maharashtra, India
- Citizenship: India
- Party: Nationalist Congress Party
- Other political affiliations: Indian National Congress
- Education: Bachelor of Arts
- Alma mater: Deogiri College, Aurangabad; Dr. Babasaheb Ambedkar Marathwada University
- Occupation: Politician

Sanjay Baburao Bansode (born 31 December 1973) is an Indian politician from Nationalist Congress Party, who is the cabinet minister of Maharashtra from 14 July 2023 for sports, youth welfare and ports. He also served as the minister of state from 30 December 2019 to 29 June 2022 in the Uddhav Thackeray government. He is a member of Nationalist Congress Party from Latur district.

He became member of Maharashtra Legislative Assembly by defeating Dr.Anil Kamble of Bharatiya Janata Party in 2019 Maharashtra Legislative Assembly election and represents Udgir-Jalkot constituency. He had participated in Namantar movement.

== Personal life ==
Bansode belongs to an Ambedkarite Buddhist family.

After completing matriculation in Latur, Bansode completed graduation from Deogiri College, Aurangabad.

== Political career ==
=== Early career ===
Bansode was known as student loving leader since he showed his leadership in college. In same time, he started to work for National Students' Union of India. He joined Indian National Congress in 1992. He was regional vice-president of Indian Youth Congress. During Namantar movement, he traveled in Marathwada with Nationalist Congress Party president Sharad Pawar.

He became executive president of NCP for Latur district when NCP founded in 1999. Since then he worked as regional secretary. He also worked as district president of Mahatma Phule Equality Council.

=== Elections ===
Bansode was defeated in triad battle to Sudhakar Bhalerao in 2014 Maharashtra Legislative Assembly election. He worked for five years in the constituency. Udgir constituency is a strong point for BJP, where NCP had only one district councillor and two Panchayat committee members.

He won 2019 Maharashtra Legislative Assembly election by defeating incumbent Dr. Anil Kamble with margin of 20,000 votes. Udgir constituency got minister after 35 years. Before Bansode, Udgir (Vidhan Sabha constituency) had a state minister Balasaheb Jadhav in 1984 to '86.

== Positions held ==
• 1992–1999: Regional vice-president of Youth Congress and member of Indian National Congress

• 1999–2019: Regional Secretary of Nationalist Congress Party

• 2019–present: Member Of Maharashtra Legislative Assembly

• 2019–2022: Minister of state for environment, water supply and sanitation, public works, employment guarantee, earthquake rehabilitation and parliamentary affairs; Government of Maharashtra

== See also ==
• Udgir (Vidhan Sabha constituency)
