= Gangadhar Gade =

Indian politician and activist (1939–2024)

Gangadhar Sukhdev Gade (1939 – 4 May 2024) was an Indian politician and Ambedkarite sociopolitical activist from Maharashtra. He was a leader of the Republican Party of India, and was president of the Panther Republic Party. He was elected to the Maharashtra Legislative Assembly in 1972. He was also the Transport Minister during the First Vilasrao Deshmukh ministry for six months.

A popular Buddhist leader among the state, Gade was the leader of the Namantar Andolan (Name change movement) of Marathwada University. On 7 July 1977, Dalit Panthers general secretary Gade firstly demanded that the name of Dr. Babasaheb Ambedkar be given to the then Marathwada University.

Gade was born in 1939 in Kavthal village of Morshi taluka of Amravati district. He died in Aurangabad on 4 May 2024, at the age of 85.
