= Namantar Shahid Smarak =

Martyrdom memorial in Maharashtra, India

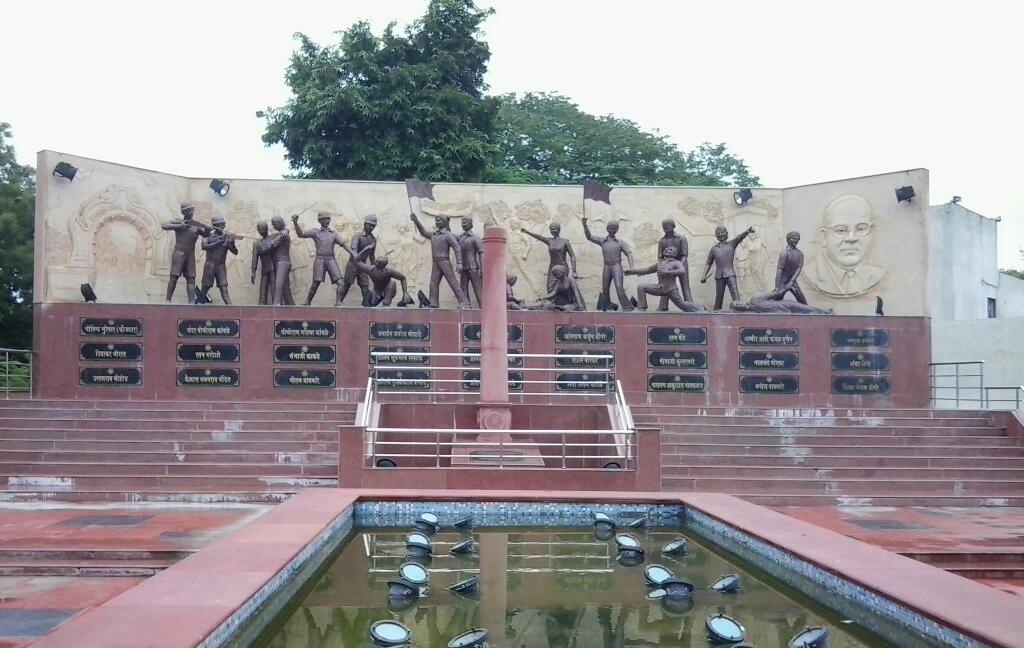
- Interactive map of Namantar Shahid Smarak
- Location: Indora Bridge 10, Kamptee Road, Nagpur, Maharashtra, India
- Coordinates: 21.1711°N 79.0966°E
- Designer: Uday Gajbhiye
- Type: Martyrdom memorial
- Completion date: 2013
- Dedicated to: Martyrs of the Namantar Andolan

The Namantar Shahid Smarak (English: Name Change Martyrdom Memorial) is a large memorial sculpture dedicated to those who died in the Namantar Andolan. In 2013, 19 years after the movement's success, the city government of Nagpur erected the monument in memory of the valour and the sacrifice of the Dalit martyrs. The memorial was built by contractor Sunil Sharma on 2,225 m^{2} of land at a cost of ₹1.58 crore (approximately US$259,000).

== Background ==
The Dalits of India were on the bottom of the Indian caste system for centuries. In Hinduism, there are four varnas (classes) and in that system, the Dalits are below the lowest of them. Dalits were considered polluted and this pollution was considered contagious. They worked in jobs which were considered ritually impure, they were not allowed to enter Hindu temples, they had to draw their water from separate wells and they had to live outside of villages. Untouchability was outlawed in 1950, but despite the laws, discrimination continues today.

In the early 20th century, one of the first Dalits to earn a college education was B. R. Ambedkar. Fighting discrimination, he attended Elphinstone College in Bombay, earned a master's degree from Columbia University in the United States and then earned a doctoral degree from the London School of Economics. The British Raj made education more available to Untouchables but discrimination continued. Ambedkar established hostels, schools and colleges which were open to Dalits. As part of the movement surrounding the independence of India from Britain, major social changes took place and Dr. B. R. Ambedkar was appointed to lead the committee to draft a new constitution for India. He proposed, and the new country passed into law, a wide range of civil liberties, including the legal abolition of untouchability.

Many Indian universities were renamed after people like Ambedkar and those changes were welcomed with few arguments. The Dalit community in the state of Maharashtra proposed to rename Marathwada University in honour of Ambedkar. The chief minister, the legislature, and university leaders approved the change, but a storm of opposition arose among Hindus. On 27 July 1978 riots began and the name change was stopped. The riots affected 25,000 Dalits and at least 27 were killed, five by the police. The Namantar Andolan (Name Change Movement) continued for 16 years before the university was renamed Dr. Babasaheb Ambedkar Marathwada University.

== Development ==
Many organisations and political parties proposed the idea for a memorial late in the 1990s and worked for 12 years to see a memorial realized. In 2010, the government of Nagpur announced the decision to build the memorial. An initial proposed design unveiled in April 2011 was not considered acceptable because it did not represent the history of the Namantar Andolan. Many suggestions were given for the memorial's design. The final design was completed by sculptor Uday Gajbhiye.

Because many Dalits had converted to Buddhism with B.R. Ambedkar, the choice of Buddha Jayanti (Buddha's Birthday) to inaugurate the monument was auspicious. Jogendra Kawade, the leader of the Namantar Long March, was present that day and he said:

A nation stands after sacrifice and laying lives for a nation's cause. The fight for naming Marathwada University after Dr Ambedkar was not a single person's fight but was a movement launched with massive support of people which bore the fruits after 16 years of continuous struggle. The Indora Bridge 10 which inspired thousands of Bhim Sainiks to launch the long march which witnessed bloody sacrifice by the Bhim Sainiks, now, stands as Shahid Smarak in a glorious and magnificent way fittingly saluting the sacrifice of Bhim Sainiks, ... This Memorial would continue to inspire the present and future generations as well.

.

== Design ==
The memorial is located at Indora Bridge 10 on Kamptee Road, Nagpur. The location was selected because it is the site where Avinash Dongre, a child protesting in support of the Namantar Andolan, was shot in the head by police on 4 August 1978. Four others - Dilip Ramteke, Abdul Sattar, Roshan Borkar and Ratan Mendhe - also lost their lives nearby. The memorial has a total of 27 sculptures of Bhim Sainiks (Soldiers of Bhim) who died during the event, who are shown in the act of their struggle. There are also 27 plaques with the name of each person, and the memorial also has a monolith to pay homage to the martyrs.

Nearby, there is a mini-theater for plays and discussions and a library with materials related to the history of the Namantar Andolan.

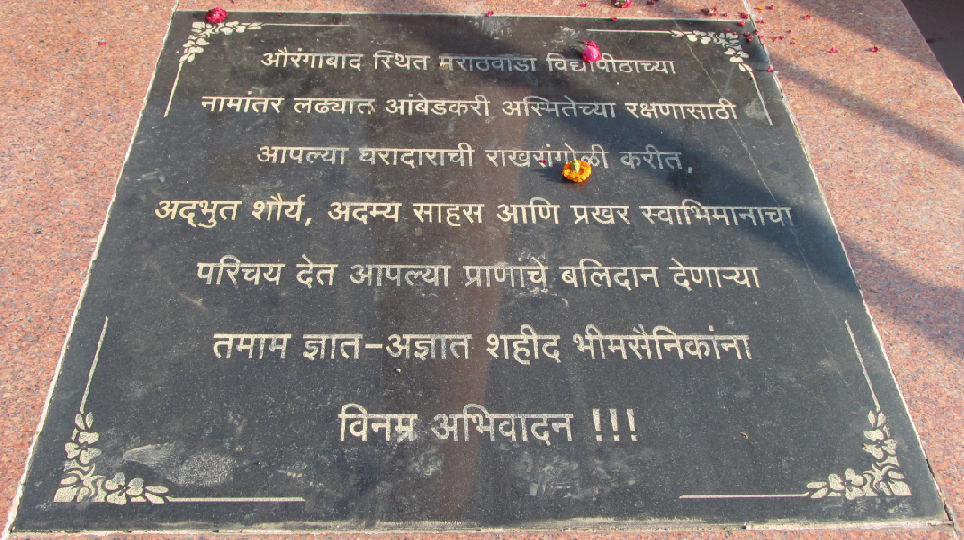
Plaque at the entrance gate

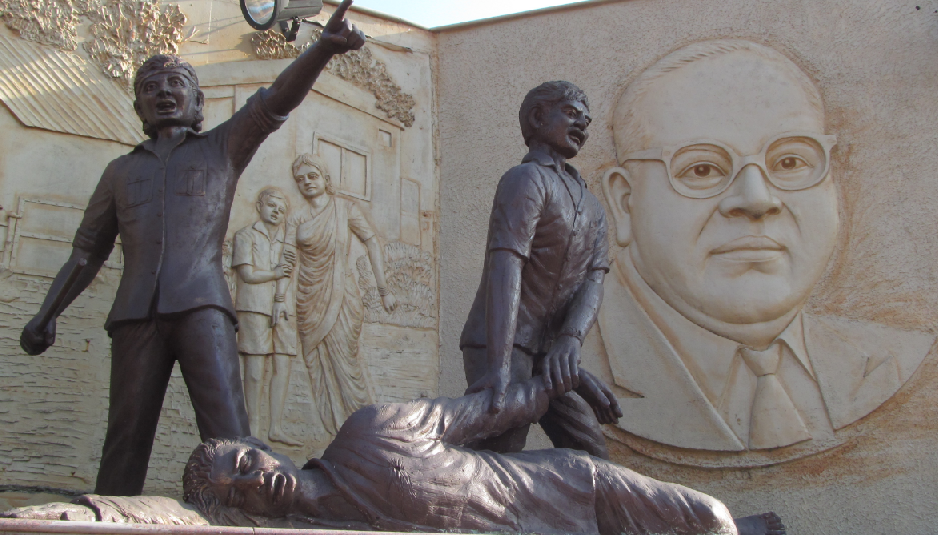
Bhim Sainiks with B. R. Ambedkar in the background

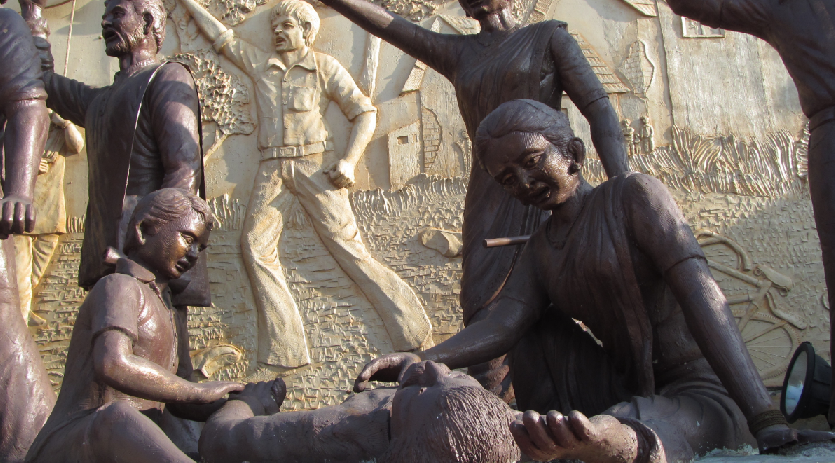
Giving aid to a fallen comrade

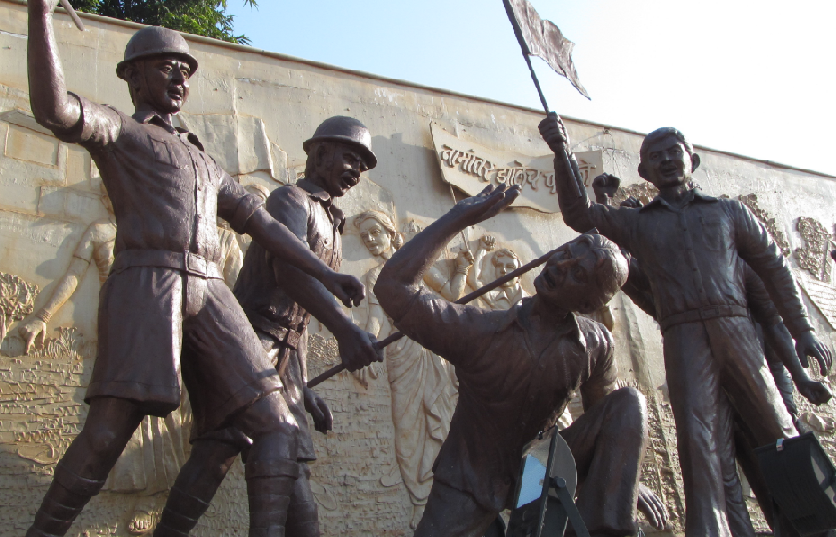
Victim of a lathi charge

The martyrs of Namantar Andolan:

- Suhasini Bansod (सुहासिनी बनसोड)
- Govind Bhurewar (गोविंद भुरेवार)
- Bhalchandra Borkar (भालचंद्र बोरकर)
- Roshan Borkar (रोशन बोरकर)
- Avinash Dongre (अविनाश डोंगरे)
- Narayan Gaikwad (नारायण गायकवाड)
- Shabbir Ali Kajal Hussain (शब्बीर अली काजल हुसैन)
- Chandar Kamble (चंदर कांबळे)
- Pochiram Kamble (पोचिराम कांबळे)
- Domaji Kuttarmare (डोमाजी कुत्तरमारे)
- Janardan Mawale (जनार्दन मवाळे)
- Janardan Mhaske (जनार्दन मस्के)
- Ratan Mendhe (रतन मेंढे)
- Kailas Pandit (कैलास पंडित)
- Ratan Pardeshi (रतन परदेशी)
- Dilip Ramteke (दिलीप रामटेके)
- Dyneshwar Sakhare (ज्ञानेश्‍वर साखरे)
- Abdul Sattar (अब्दुल सत्तार)
- Pratibha Tayade (प्रतिभा तायडे)
- Diwakar Thorat (दिवाकर थोरात)
- Gautam Waghmare (गौतम वाघमारे)
- Manoj Waghmare (मनोज वाघमारे)
- Shila Waghmare (शीला वाघमारे)

== See also ==
- Battle of Koregaon
