= Udgir Assembly constituency =

Constituency of the Maharashtra legislative assembly in India

Coordinates: 18.39°N 77.11°E

Udgir
- Constituency No. 237 for the Maharashtra Legislative Assembly

Constituency details
- Country: India
- Region: Western India
- State: Maharashtra
- District: Latur
- Lok Sabha constituency: Latur
- Established: 1952
- Total electors: 323,962
- Reservation: SC

Member of Legislative Assembly
- 15th Maharashtra Legislative Assembly
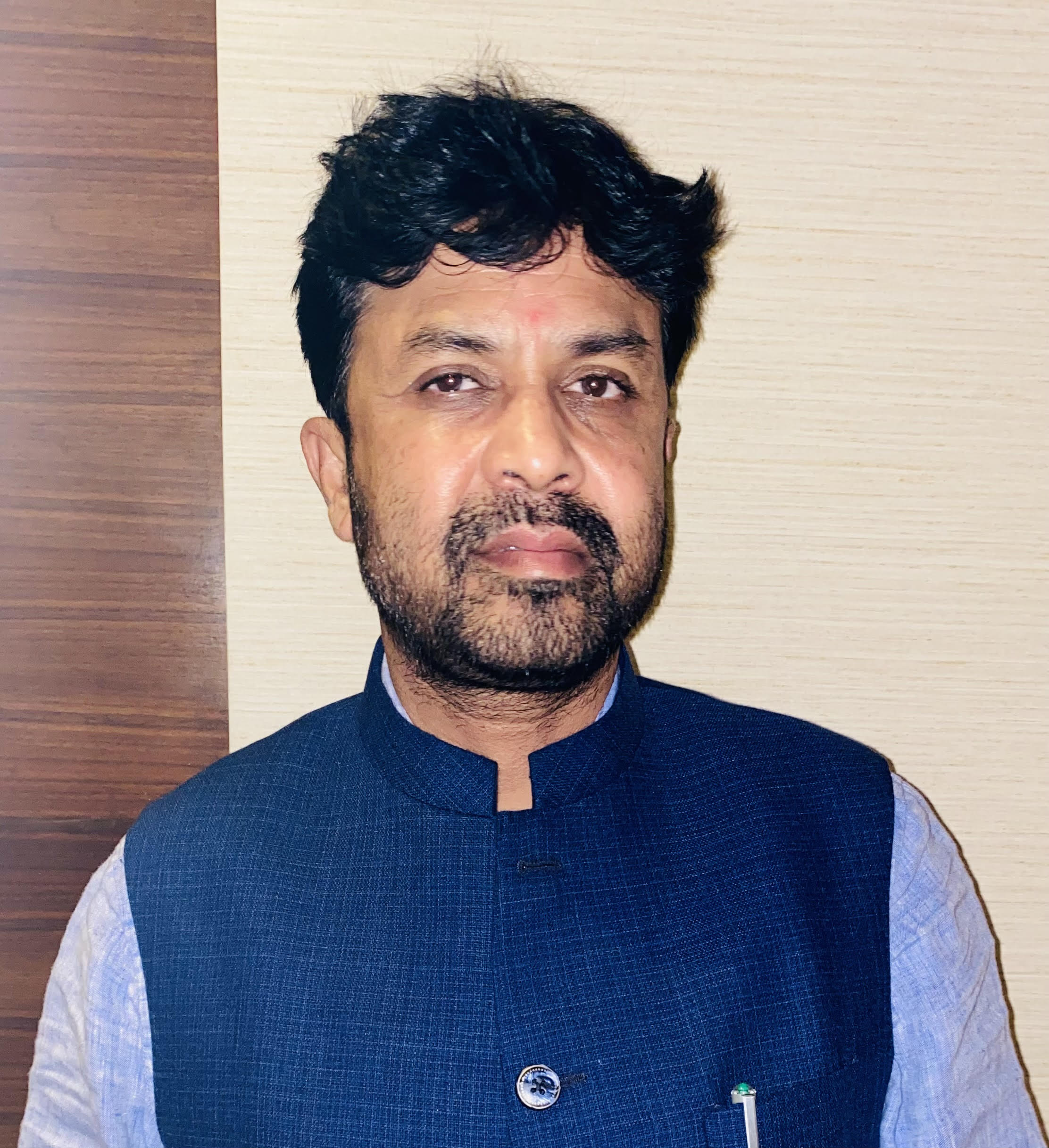
- Incumbent Sanjay Bansode
- Party: NCP
- Alliance: NDA
- Elected year: 2024

Udgir Assembly constituency is one of the six Maharashtra Assembly constituencies in Latur Lok Sabha constituency.

== Members of the Legislative Assembly ==
Election	Member	Party
1952	Ghonsikar Madhavrao	Indian National Congress
1952	Kamble Tulsiram	Indian National Congress
1962	Vithalrao Bapurao	Indian National Congress
1967	P. S. Sarwade	Indian National Congress
1972	Vithalrao Khadiwale	Republican Party of India
1978	Balasaheb Kishanrao Jadhav	Indian National Congress
1980	Balasaheb Kishanrao Jadhav	Indian National Congress
1985	Balasaheb Kishanrao Jadhav	Indian National Congress
1990	Narayanrao Bajirao Patil	Janata Dal
1995	Prof. Manohar Digamberrao Patwari	Indian National Congress
1999	Govind Dnyanoba Kendre	Bharatiya Janata Party
2004	Chandrashekhar Dhoniba Bhosale	Nationalist Congress Party
2009	Sudhakar Sangram Bhalerao	Bharatiya Janata Party
2014	Sudhakar Sangram Bhalerao	Bharatiya Janata Party
2019	Sanjay Bansode	Nationalist Congress Party
2024	Sanjay Bansode	Nationalist Congress Party

== Election results ==
=== Assembly Election 2024 ===
2024 Maharashtra Legislative Assembly election : Udgir
Party	Candidate	Votes	%	±%
NCP	Sanjay Bansode	152,038	69.28%	New
NCP-SP	Sudhakar Sangram Bhalerao	58,824	26.81%	New
Bahujan Bharat Party	Bhaskar Dattatraya Bandewar	4,622	2.11%	New
NOTA	None of the above	991	0.45%	▼0.16
Margin of victory		93,214	42.48%	▲30.96
Turnout		220,435	68.04%	▲7.83
Total valid votes		219,444		
Registered electors		323,962		▲8.30
NCP gain from NCP		Swing	▲15.31	

=== Assembly Election 2019 ===
2019 Maharashtra Legislative Assembly election : Udgir
Party	Candidate	Votes	%	±%
NCP	Sanjay Bansode	96,366	53.97%	▲29.26
BJP	Anil Sadashiv Kamble	75,787	42.44%	▲3.02
VBA	Atul Abhimanyu Dhaware	2,599	1.46%	New
NOTA	None of the above	1,097	0.61%	▲0.05
Margin of victory		20,579	11.52%	▼3.20
Turnout		180,100	60.21%	▼2.45
Total valid votes		178,565		
Registered electors		299,139		▲10.14
NCP gain from BJP		Swing	▲14.55	

=== Assembly Election 2014 ===
2014 Maharashtra Legislative Assembly election : Udgir
Party	Candidate	Votes	%	±%
BJP	Sudhakar Sangram Bhalerao	66,686	39.42%	▼7.38
NCP	Sanjay Bansode	41,792	24.71%	▼11.14
INC	Prof. Ramkishan Bhimrao Sonkamble	37,837	22.37%	New
SS	Adavale Ramchandra Madhavrao	15,418	9.12%	New
Independent	Gaikwad Madankumar Rajendra	1,958	1.16%	New
SP	Sangave Nivrutti Sambhaji	1,465	0.87%	New
NOTA	None of the above	955	0.56%	New
Margin of victory		24,894	14.72%	▲3.77
Turnout		170,199	62.66%	▼1.41
Total valid votes		169,148		
Registered electors		271,610		▲10.29
BJP hold		Swing	▼7.38	

=== Assembly Election 2009 ===
2009 Maharashtra Legislative Assembly election : Udgir
Party	Candidate	Votes	%	±%
BJP	Sudhakar Sangram Bhalerao	73,840	46.80%	▲11.95
NCP	Kaamant Machhindra Gunwantrao	56,563	35.85%	▼0.99
RPI(A)	Adv. Bhalerao Gautam Pandurangrao	16,286	10.32%	New
BSP	Gaikwad Madhav Chimaji	1,246	0.79%	▼3.82
Independent	Ramkishan Sambhaji Gotmukhale	1,232	0.78%	New
LJP	Gaikwad Mahadev Nivrati	1,030	0.65%	New
Independent	More Balaji Ramrao	995	0.63%	New
Margin of victory		17,277	10.95%	▲8.96
Turnout		157,784	64.07%	▼6.95
Total valid votes		157,777		
Registered electors		246,273		▲11.86
BJP gain from NCP		Swing	▲9.96	

=== Assembly Election 2004 ===
2004 Maharashtra Legislative Assembly election : Udgir
Party	Candidate	Votes	%	±%
NCP	Bhosale Chandrashekhar Dhoniba	57,605	36.84%	▲5.41
BJP	Kendre Govind Dnyanoba	54,488	34.85%	▼7.27
SP	Prof. Patwari Manohar Digambarrao	26,341	16.85%	New
BSP	Adv. Khateeb Hisamoddin Nizamoddin	7,209	4.61%	New
Independent	Sangave Niurti Sambhaji	1,617	1.03%	New
Margin of victory		3,117	1.99%	▼8.70
Turnout		156,364	71.02%	▼3.42
Total valid votes		156,357		
Registered electors		220,164		▲29.92
NCP gain from BJP		Swing	▼5.28	

=== Assembly Election 1999 ===
1999 Maharashtra Legislative Assembly election : Udgir
Party	Candidate	Votes	%	±%
BJP	Kendre Govind Dnyanoba	50,394	42.12%	▲23.96
NCP	Jadhav Balasaheb Kishanrao	37,604	31.43%	New
INC	Prof. Patwari Manohar Digambarrao	30,072	25.14%	▼0.80
Independent	Waghmare Sangram Ganpat	887	0.74%	New
Margin of victory		12,790	10.69%	▲8.17
Turnout		126,151	74.44%	▼8.76
Total valid votes		119,636		
Registered electors		169,459		▲4.38
BJP gain from INC		Swing	▲16.18	

=== Assembly Election 1995 ===
1995 Maharashtra Legislative Assembly election : Udgir
Party	Candidate	Votes	%	±%
INC	Prof. Patwari Manohar Digamberrao	34,333	25.94%	▼11.04
JD	Kendre Govind Dnyanoba	30,996	23.42%	▼13.94
BJP	Dr. Yerme Prakash Tulshiram	24,040	18.16%	▲11.85
Independent	Patil Ramchandra Vithalrao	19,983	15.10%	New
BSP	Jahagirdar Kalimoddin Rijawanoddin	11,433	8.64%	New
Independent	Bais Bhagwansingh Ganeshsingh	5,106	3.86%	New
Independent	Majge Rajkumar Annarao	2,284	1.73%	New
Independent	Wattamwar Shyam Hanmanth	1,278	0.97%	New
Margin of victory		3,337	2.52%	▲2.14
Turnout		135,082	83.20%	▲21.10
Total valid votes		132,362		
Registered electors		162,353		▼5.61
INC gain from JD		Swing	▼11.42	

=== Assembly Election 1990 ===
1990 Maharashtra Legislative Assembly election : Udgir
Party	Candidate	Votes	%	±%
JD	Patil Narayanrao Bajirao	39,246	37.36%	New
INC	Baswaraj Malsetti Patil	38,844	36.98%	▼16.00
Independent	Patil Ramchandra Vithalrao (Talegaonkar)	12,974	12.35%	New
BJP	Vishwanath Shankarrao Anhulge	6,628	6.31%	New
Independent	Patil Narsing Subhanrao	1,755	1.67%	New
Independent	Jadhav Prabhakar Shankarrao	1,048	1.00%	New
Independent	Motiram Nagoba Dawale	962	0.92%	New
Independent	Pawar Sanjay Tukaram	820	0.78%	New
Margin of victory		402	0.38%	▼7.83
Turnout		106,816	62.10%	▼4.38
Total valid votes		105,035		
Registered electors		171,999		▲29.06
JD gain from INC		Swing	▼15.62	

=== Assembly Election 1985 ===
1985 Maharashtra Legislative Assembly election : Udgir
Party	Candidate	Votes	%	±%
INC	Jadhav Balasaheb Kishanrao	46,231	52.98%	New
Independent	Patwari Manoharrao Digamberrao	39,066	44.77%	New
IC(S)	Shinde Tulshiram Daulatrao	1,442	1.65%	New
Margin of victory		7,165	8.21%	▼14.23
Turnout		88,601	66.48%	▲4.14
Total valid votes		87,254		
Registered electors		133,267		▲10.17
INC gain from INC(U)		Swing	▲8.03	

=== Assembly Election 1980 ===
1980 Maharashtra Legislative Assembly election : Udgir
Party	Candidate	Votes	%	±%
INC(U)	Jadhav Balasaheb Kishanrao	33,243	44.95%	New
JP	Patwari Manoharrao Digamberrao	16,647	22.51%	New
INC(I)	Patil Pandhirinath Gyanoba	11,873	16.05%	New
RPI(K)	Rathod Rajaram Thawara	10,456	14.14%	New
BJP	Boralkar A. Ajij Malakji	1,739	2.35%	New
Margin of victory		16,596	22.44%	▲15.33
Turnout		75,404	62.34%	▼3.04
Total valid votes		73,958		
Registered electors		120,964		▲9.99
INC(U) gain from INC		Swing	▲9.99	

=== Assembly Election 1978 ===
1978 Maharashtra Legislative Assembly election : Udgir
Party	Candidate	Votes	%	±%
INC	Jadhav Balasaheb Kishanrao	24,455	34.96%	▼12.01
PWPI	Patwari Manohar Digambarrao	19,482	27.85%	New
JP	Kaldate Shridhar Narayanrao	17,294	24.73%	New
Independent	Manjur Ahmedkhan Hussain Khan	8,714	12.46%	New
Margin of victory		4,973	7.11%	▲6.59
Turnout		71,899	65.38%	▲20.11
Total valid votes		69,945		
Registered electors		109,973		▲3.87
INC gain from RPI		Swing	▼12.53	

=== Assembly Election 1972 ===
1972 Maharashtra Legislative Assembly election : Udgir
Party	Candidate	Votes	%	±%
RPI	Vithalrao Khadiwale	22,058	47.49%	▲29.28
INC	Ghoge Bhimrao Manikrao	21,815	46.97%	▲0.86
ABJS	Gaikwad Gopalrao Shetiba	2,200	4.74%	New
Independent	Kamble Sopan Kishan	371	0.80%	New
Margin of victory		243	0.52%	▼15.92
Turnout		47,934	45.27%	▲5.19
Total valid votes		46,444		
Registered electors		105,877		▲15.72
RPI gain from INC		Swing	▲1.38	

=== Assembly Election 1967 ===
1967 Maharashtra Legislative Assembly election : Udgir
Party	Candidate	Votes	%	±%
INC	P. S. Sarwade	15,419	46.11%	▼23.72
Independent	V. B. Khadiwale	9,920	29.67%	New
RPI	G. K. Mahalinge	6,090	18.21%	New
Independent	P. S. Waghmare	1,293	3.87%	New
Independent	N. S. Gawle	718	2.15%	New
Margin of victory		5,499	16.44%	▼28.65
Turnout		36,673	40.08%	▼8.77
Total valid votes		33,440		
Registered electors		91,496		▲37.46
INC hold		Swing	▼23.72	

=== Assembly Election 1962 ===
1962 Maharashtra Legislative Assembly election : Udgir
Party	Candidate	Votes	%	±%
INC	Vithalrao Bapurao	21,494	69.83%	▲1.39
RPI	Kisan Sakharam	7,616	24.74%	New
PSP	Laxman Dhondiba Arkade	1,669	5.42%	New
Margin of victory		13,878	45.09%	▲8.20
Turnout		32,516	48.85%	▲6.37
Total valid votes		30,779		
Registered electors		66,560		▼39.42
INC hold		Swing	▲1.39	

=== Assembly Election 1952 ===
1952 Hyderabad State Legislative Assembly election : Udgir
Party	Candidate	Votes	%	±%
INC	Ghonsikar Madhavrao	31,945	68.44%	New
Independent	Kheni Maharudrappa	14,728	31.56%	New
INC	Kamble Tulsiram			
Margin of victory		17,217	36.89%	
Turnout		46,673	42.48%	
Total valid votes		46,673		
Registered electors		109,863		
INC win (new seat)				
