= Sudhakar Sangram Bhalerao =

Indian politician

Member of the Maharashtra Legislative Assembly
- In office 2009–2019
- Preceded by: Chandrashekhar Bhosale
- Succeeded by: Sanjay Bansode
- Constituency: Udgir

Personal details
- Party: Nationalist Congress Party (SP) NCP (SP) (2024–present)
- Other political affiliations: Bharatiya Janata Party (2009–2024)

Sudhakar Sangram Bhalerao, also known as Sudhakar Bhalerao, is an Indian politician who served as Member of the Maharashtra Legislative Assembly from Udgir constituency elected in 2009 and 2014. He contested in 2024 Maharashtra Legislative Assembly Election. He lost election against Nationalist Congress Party SP Candidate with the Margin of 93,214 votes, Sudhakar Sangram Bhalerao gained 58,824 votes.

== Constituency ==
Udgir is a reserved constituency (Scheduled Caste) in the Latur district of Maharashtra. The constituency comes under Latur district of Maharashtra State.

== Electoral history ==
Year	Party	Constituency	Result
2009	BJP	Udgir	Won
2014	BJP	Udgir	Won
2024	NCP-SP	Udgir	Lost
