= Namantar Andolan =

Dalit and Navayana Buddhist movement

- Part of Dalit Buddhist movement
- Gate of the renamed university and statue of Dr. Ambedkar in distance
- Date: 27 July 1978 - 14 January 1994
- Location: Marathwada, Maharashtra, India
- Goals: Renaming of Marathwada University
- Methods: Protest march, street protest, riot, strike
- Result: Renamed Dr. Babasaheb Ambedkar Marathwada University

Namantar Andolan (English: Name Change Movement) was a Dalit and Navayana Buddhist movement to change the name of Marathwada University, in Aurangabad, Maharashtra, India, to Dr. Babasaheb Ambedkar University. It achieved a measure of success in 1994, when the compromise name of Dr. Babasaheb Ambedkar Marathwada University was accepted. The movement was notable for the violence against Dalits and Navayana Buddhists.

== Background ==
Namantar means name change and andolan means social movement. The Namantar Andolan was a 16-year-long Dalit campaign to rename Marathwada University in recognition of B. R. Ambedkar, the jurist, politician and social reformer who had proposed that untouchability should be made illegal.

Non-Dalit student groups initially supported the demand to have the university renamed but did so less for reasons of dogma than for the pragmatic desire to bring the Dalit, mostly Mahar (now Buddhists), students into the general fold. Dalit students traditionally showed no interest in supporting such causes as lower fees and cheaper textbooks, but they constituted around 26 percent of the student population and anticipated quid pro quo. A march involving Dalit and non-Dalit students was organised, with the intent of petitioning the council of the university for the change. The procession met with another, headed by Gangadhar Gade, a Dalit Panthers leader, who launched a tirade of abuse at the non-Dalit contingent as he asserted the right of the Dalits to take all the credit for the change in name. This alienated the non-Dalit students and, according to Dipankar Gupta, "the division was caused not so much by Hindu caste prejudices and reticence to support the renaming of the University, but rather by the splittist and sectarian position taken by Gadhe", who might also be concerned that any alliance between Dalits and non-Dalits could affect the potency of the Panthers. Among left-wing organisations, only the Students' Federation of India and Yukrant continued to support the campaign.

In 1977, the chief minister of Maharashtra, Vasantdada Patil, promised that the renaming would occur, and in July 1978, the Maharashtra Legislature approved it. Uttara Shastree notes that the campaign at this time reflected the desire of neo-Buddhists for an improved image and position in society, as a significant part of which they called on the symbolic ideas of Ambedkar, that had preceded his rise to prominence. The University Executive Body passed a resolution to rename the university and this series of decisions was the catalyst for rioting, which began on 27 July 1978 and lasted several weeks.

Commentators such as Gail Omvedt believe that the violence was a caste war based on hatred; whilst others, such as Gupta, believe that the causes were more varied. Both Omvedt and Gupta noted that the violence was aimed at the Mahars (now Buddhists) and did not extend to other Dalit groups, while Gupta also notes that it was concentrated in the three districts of Marathwada — Aurangabad, Nanded and Parbhani — where Dalit registrations in schools and colleges were particularly high, and economic competition was the most fierce. In particular, the centres of the unrest were urban areas, where the impact of Mahar aspirations would most deeply affect the employment, social, and economic roles which Hindu castes considered to be their preserve. Troubles were largely absent from the other two districts, Beed and Osmanabad, and the spill of problems into rural areas generally was patchy. (Note: In some rural villages, caste Hindus assisted in defending their Mahar neighbours against trouble-makers; in other instances where trouble arose, it might be on a selective basis, with some particularly aspirational Mahars being targeted but the remainder being tolerated.) These issues of geographic and demographic targeting, according to Gupta, indicate that the real causes of the violence were more subtle than war between caste Hindu and Dalit. There were also instances of violent acts taking place under the pretext of the riots elsewhere but in fact to settle very local and personal scores unrelated to the broader causes. In contradiction to these views, Y. C. Damle maintains that the violence "specially affected the Scheduled Caste people in the villages although the agitation for renaming the Marathwada University after B. R. Ambedkar was spearheaded by Dalit Panthers and such leaders mainly in urban centres. In giving a call for agitation, hardly any effort was made to protect the villages or villagers."

== Attacks ==
Riots affected 1,200 villages in Marathwada, impacting on 25,000 Marathi Buddhists and Hindu Dalits and causing thousands of them to seek safety in jungles. The terrorised Dalits did not return to their villages, despite starvation. This violence was allegedly organised by members of the Maratha community and took many forms, including killings, burning of houses and huts, pillaging of Dalit colonies, forcing Dalits out of villages, polluting drinking water wells, destruction of cattle, and refusal to employ. This continued for 67 days. According to the Yukrant leader, attacks on Dalit were collective and pre-planned. In many villages, Dalit colonies were burned. The burning houses in Marathwada region affected 900 Dalit households. Upper caste rioters demolished essential household items that the Dalit possessed. They even burned the fodder stocks owned by Dalits. The bridges and culverts were intentionally broken or damaged to paralyse the military and police aid in villages during the time of the attacks. Upper caste mobs attacked government property including government hospitals, railway stations, gram panchayat offices, state transport buses, district council operated school buildings, the telephone system and the government go downs. ₹30 crore worth property was damaged. The Marathwada region was under siege of violence for over two years. The Dalits were wrecked economically and psychologically. Many Dalit protesters were physically injured and nineteen died including five protesters who lost their lives during the police repression.

Much of the violence occurred in Nanded district. Examples include:

- Sonkhed village: The mob burned a Dalit residential area. Two women were raped and three children were killed.
- Sugaon village: Janardhan Mavde was killed.
- Bolsa and Izzatgaon villages: women were raped and tortured (one woman had her breast cut off).
- The elder son of the martyr Pochiram Kamble, Chandar Kamble, lost his life during the Andolan.
- Koklegaon: A Dalit teacher, local social activist, was tortured with his wife. Dalit habitations were set on fire.

Violence also occurred in Parbhani district. Examples include:

- Parbhani: Hindu students and youths destroyed the statue of Ambedkar at Bhim Nagar.
- Parbhani: On 17 July 1978, agitators stopped buses and trains and even cut the telephone lines. The police did not intervene, and after 30 July Dalit habitations were targeted.
- Adgaon Village: Dalits were threatened; cattle shed and agricultural equipments were torched.
- Samiti observed similar violent incidents (like Nanded district) in Koregaon, Kaulgaon, Nandgaon, Sodgaon, Halta, Cohgaon, Nandapur, and many other villages of Parbhani district.

Examples of violence in Aurangabad district included:

- Aurangabad: Non-Dalits destroyed public property by burning buses, blowing up bridges to paralyze the social life.
- Aurangabad: Many professors opposed renaming the university. On the other hand, prof. Desarda, a Marxist teacher, was beaten by Maratha students for supporting the Namantar.
- Akola Village: Mahajanrao Patil, a Lingayat, an upper caste Hindu, helped Dalits so he was beaten badly. Police did not react after his complaint. Kashinath Borde, neo-Buddhist police Patil, a flour mill owner, who officially reported complaints of harassment against Hindus was targeted. His bullock cart, household goods and house were burned.

Examples of violence in Beed district included:

- Ambajogai: : Followers of Sharad Pawar got assaulted.

Examples of violence in Osmanabad district included:

- Tuljapur: Dalit women were specifically attacked. Upper caste women helped in the torching of Dalit houses.
- Dalits were terrorised by damaging the road bridges, telephone lines and the roads connecting between Kalamb and Yermala.
- Dalits in Tuljapur, Savargaon, Bavi, Pthrud, and Wagholi attacked.
- A group of almost 900 violent upper caste youths attacked Dalits.

Example of violence in Hingoli district included:

- Basmath: After the attacks, the Tehsildar did not provide meals for the victims. Instead, he advised them to beg for it.

Examples of violence in Nashik district included:

- Nashik: The attempts were made to garland the statue of Shivaji with footwear, to criticize Neo-Buddhists and to activate riots.
- Vihit village: The statue of Ambedkar was damaged.

Examples of violence in Nagpur included:

- The police shot Avinash Dongre, a child, in his head when he was chanting the slogan Change the name at Indora Bridge 10.
- Along with Dongre, Dilip Ramteke, Abdul Sattar, Roshan Borkar and Ratan Mendhe sacrificed their lives in Namantar struggle at Nagpur.

In Jalgot Village, Inspector Bhurevar was beaten and then burned alive by a mob at a police outpost. Violence was reported in Pune. Demonstrators in Mumbai teargassed. Statues of Ambedkar and the Buddha through the region were also damaged or destroyed.

== Role of media, political parties and bureaucrats ==
=== Media ===
The regional press played a biased role during the violence. The Marathi Newspaper, Prajawani and Godatir Samachar, opposed the Namantar "by giving wide publicity to the riots in the cities and suppressing news in the rural areas." According to Aurangabad daily, Marathwada the Namantar was a cultural violation for Marathwada existence. The press did not publish about rural violence news. They did not report the declarations by the Republican Party of India and Dalit Panthers. The front page of a famous Marathi newspaper published a notice for upper caste Hindus to support the agitation. Similarly, people were urged through letters, flyers, and hand-outs to join the agitation. The Parliamentary Committee advised to reinforce the police intelligence with radio communication, telephones, and motor vehicles in talukas. But the media intensified on allegations that the Scheduled Caste and Scheduled Tribe (Prevention of Atrocities) Act, 1989 was being misused. Bhalchandra Nemade commented "All Marathi newspapers are communal and they thrive on the so-called 'freedom of the press' to serve their own aims." The chief minister of Maharashtra admitted the one-sided role of the press.

=== Political parties ===
Shiv Sena, the Hindutva political party, initially declared itself opposed to the Namantar. During the agitation, the supporters of Bal Thackeray burnt homes of the Dalits. People were physically harmed, including by attacks with swords. Interviewers explained that the attackers were from the Maratha community, who also burned Dalit properties in Nanded district. Supporters of the Peasants and Workers Party of India (PWP) and Indian National Congress were involved in these burnings. In the same area, there were allegations of two women raped and three children killed, but no legal action instigated. According to Gopal Guru:

PWP and Shiv Sena aggravated the tension in Parbhani, Nanded, Beed, and Osmanabad. Congress did not show any inclination to defuse the tension and whatever efforts were made particularly by the Congress leaders from Beed and Osmanabad districts were insufficient or localised. On the other hand, Congress leaders particularly from Latur, Aurangabad, Jalna and to some extent Beed districts identified with the Dalit cause and worked for the Dalit harmony in these districts to maintain political impression.

But later in 2011, Bal Thackeray cleared that he never opposed the Namantar. He said in an interview that:

Let me make it clear once again. I never opposed the renaming of the university. I had suggested that the name Marathwada University be retained, and Ambedkar's name is added to it. RPI leader R. S. Gavai came to my residence and I suggested that Ambedkar's name is added to the existing name of the university. He liked the idea and phoned Sharad Pawar (the then chief minister) who also gave his approval. My stance was that while renaming the varsity, the pride of Marathwada region should remain intact.

=== Bureaucrats ===
Many Dalits were harassed by the police as they continued to campaign for the change. The police allegedly reacted by adopting tactics such as delay and suppression of evidence. In a few villages, Hindu police patils and sarpanchs of all riot-affected villages teamed up with rich Hindu caste landowners to attack Dalit's poor peasants and agricultural labourers. The police joined the mob in a violent way. The district collector of Nanded was from Dalit community, and was powerless when his assistant officers refused his commands. In Akola Village, the police intentionally refused to lodge complains during violence against upper caste Hindus. In Nanded, the curfew was enforced during agitation. The sons of the resident Deputy Collector, Home Inspector and Circle Inspector took part in the riot. During restriction timings, the Dalit homeguards interrupted them. A complaint was registered contrary to the homeguards. The complaints lodged by the Dalits were taken cold-bloodedly by the police. A Parliamentary Committee concluded that the police were "mere spectators to the incidents" during the atrocities.

== Effects ==
After the riots, many landlords refused to employ Dalits, even at public places such as hotels. They discriminated against them. Rioters created a silent boycott. Because of fearful environment the Dalits migrated to the cities, and did not return to their villages. Dalit-grown crops got set on fire. In 1985, in the Wakod village of Sillod taluka, the standing crops owned by Dalits on their land were ploughed up by the Sarpanch himself. A few college teachers and academicians formed a samiti to rehabilitate Dalit victims to restore harmony to the community. Muslims of Marathwada opposed the bandhs declared by Shiv Sena. They did not close their commercial establishments to show their support for Namantar. The Parliamentary Committee revealed that humanitarian aid provided to help Dalits was not sufficient to recover the losses. Moreover, Samiti observed the corruption in it.

Sooner after the atrocities, authorities brought around 3000 individuals into the police custody, but victims reported that very few went into the court, and the remaining cases weren't much faster. Even natives pressured to dismiss all cases. The parliamentary committee advised "an automatic judicial inquiry in all cases of large-scale arson and looting involved Dalits". But, the judicial inquiry was opposed by the Maharashtra government.

== Long March ==
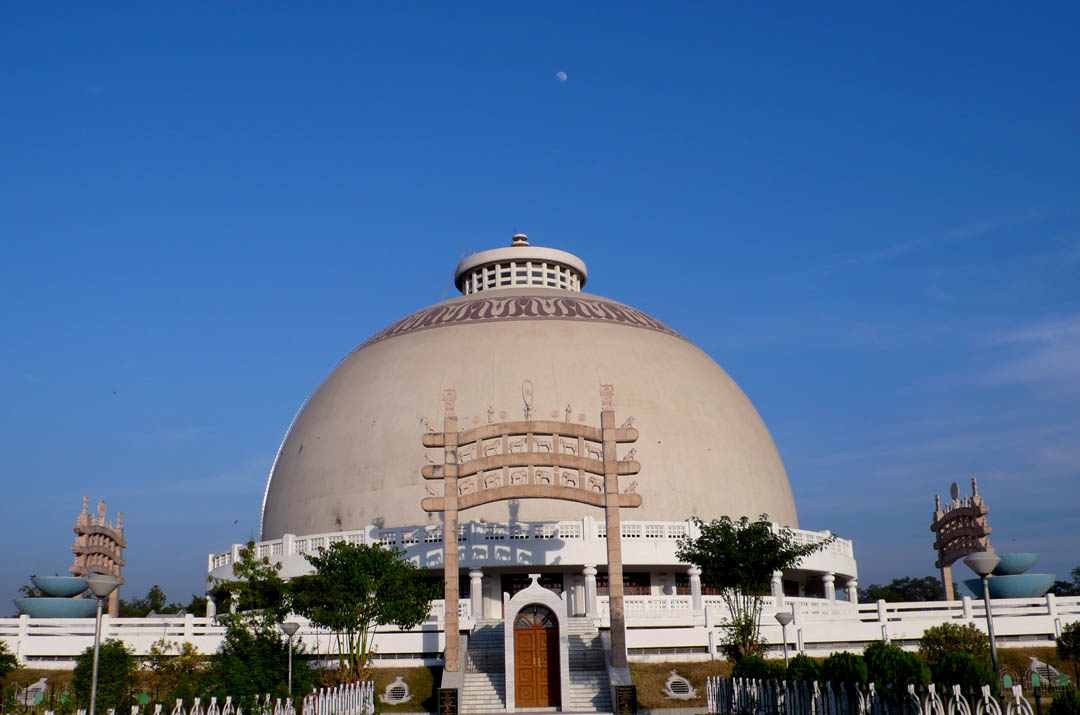
Deekshabhoomi, where Ambedkar embraced Buddhism, from where Jogendra Kawade launched and led the Long March on 11 November 1979

On 4 August 1978, Jogendra Kawade led a march from Deekshabhoomi to the district magistrate's office in Nagpur to rename the university. On the same day, there was a meeting in Aakashwani Chowk that was attended by a large student crowd. Following, the people were going back home zestfully. The provoked violence started when some anti-social elements pelted stones at transportation links. The police opened fire to overcome turbulence. After this incident, the Long March was declared. Dalit protestors from Delhi, Haryana, Bihar, Madhya Pradesh, Andhra Pradesh, Karnataka and Tamil Nadu reached to Nagpur.

The violence caused the Dalits to suspend their campaign for a while, but when a new incumbent as chief minister, Sharad Pawar, found various reasons to postpone the renaming, the reaction was the organisation of a Long March and instigating the Namantar Andolan. The march was inspired by the Chinese Long March and intended to end symbolically with convergence in Aurangabad on 6 December 1979, on Ambedkar's death anniversary. According to Omvedt, "Long March was organised by very factionalised committees that included the Dalit Panthers, smaller Dalit organisations, the Republican Party factions, socialist individuals and groups, and the Communist parties." The protest march was led by Jogendra Kawade and caused the arrest of thousands of protesters as well as prominent leaders. According to Kawade "this was the fight for the protection of democracy and humanism".

The Long March began on a Dhammachakra Pravartan Din from Deekshabhoomi, Nagpur, an area populated by many Buddhists, towards Aurangabad, blessed by Bhadant Anand Kausalyayan. Each day, protesters marched 30 kilometres to cover a distance of 470 kilometres in 18 days in the bitter cold. This was one of the most remarkable andolan in Indian history, after the 1927 Indian Independence movement due to Dalit women's active key role–they took part in the Jail Bharo Andolan with pride. At every village, masses of people joined the Long March. "This march was the world's third largest Long March." According to Yukrant leader, around 3 lakhs of people were expected to join the Long March to rename the university after Ambedkar's name. A small percentage reached to Aurangabad, but minimum 3 lakhs organized the mass protest – satyagraha, Jail Bharo Andolan, March. The protesters clashed with the police between 25 November to 6 December. Thousands of Long March activists walking from Nagpur, Udgir, and Satara were taken into custody at the boundaries of Marathwada. Thousands were arrested during the satyagraha struggle at their towns and cities. During 6 December, Ambedkar's death anniversary, protesters were lathi charged and police fired shots on them. On the same day, Vidarbha bandh was observed. On 27 November, police stopped the protesters at Khadakpurna River Bridge in Buldhana district in the afternoon. Thousands of protesters started a sit-in at the Khadakpurna River Bridge. They were lathi charged after 12 midnight in their sleep. During the course, many ran away, and hundreds were arrested.

On 3 December, there was a protest by Dalit youths who burned buses. 4 of them died in clashes with the police at Nagpur. Police arrested around 12,000 demonstrators, who planned to march towards the university from Kranti Chowk, at Auragabad. Demonstrators of Dalit Panthers were arrested at Bhadkal Gate and at the university entrance. Leaders and activists arrested, physically harmed, lathi charged, shot with tear gas, and air firing to disperse the crowd. The intention of the state was to control and disperse demonstrators and keep them from anti Dalits, who formed the Namantar Virodhi Group (a group opposing renaming). Most of them were freed from jails on the same evening but few refused to leave the jails to continue satyagraha. The main agenda of this Long March was to battle against caste oppression.

The movement became a part of Dalit literature. According to Omvedt, "the upsurge, turmoil's and frustration of the long march campaign brought the movement to a new turning point. The readiness for action shown by Dalit masses provided a demonstration of their powerful urge for revolutionary change". During the Long March, men sung songs of martyrs. Women even joined children to boost this revolution. The andolan gradually turned out in Agra, Delhi, Bengaluru, Hyderabad, where people protested marching. For 16 years, many meetings were held, people protested marching, and they were arrested many times.

== Namvistar Din ==
Govindbhai Shroff was against renaming the university, but he requested people to accept the new name with non-violence. Concurrently, he pressed a requirement to withdraw the Scheduled Caste and Scheduled Tribe (Prevention of Atrocities) Act, 1989 cases against non-Dalits, specifically the malafide ones. Tight security was deployed on the eve of the announcement with a few incidents reported in Parbhani and Amravati. The police imposed a curfew at Tuljapur and shots fired by the police were reported in Beed. After renaming the university, at least four Dalits were stabbed, Dalit property was set on fire and statues of Ambedkar dishonoured at Parbhani and Osmanabad. However, in Osmanabad district, at Kathi Savargaon, the renaming decision was welcomed with celebration by Maratha sarpanch in village. A similar case was reported in Lohara.

Marathwada region has a diverse cultural and historical background, so many names were suggested. Finally the "university was renamed as Dr. Babasaheb Ambedkar Marathwada University to pay homage to the work done by B. R. Ambedkar for the educational development of the Marathwada region." The university name was eventually altered on 14 January 1994. The chosen form — Dr. Babasaheb Ambedkar Marathwada University — represents an expansion of the existing name (a Namvistar) rather than complete change (Namanatar). Sharad Pawar also announced that it would be a policy to encourage higher education for everyone, irrespective of caste, class, religion, and ethnicity. Moreover, the newly named university was developed with improved facilities in some departments to conceptualize the dream of Ambedkar, which was one of the important parameters for the university. At the same time, the university adopted the Ajanta arch, with elephants as its primary logo, reflecting the Buddhist cultural significance of the Ajanta Caves.

Every 14 January, the followers of Ambedkar throng the university. The political parties and organizations, based on Ambedkar's thinking, celebrate this day. Many people visit the university to celebrate the Namvistar Din, so political parties arrange their rallies traditionally. The university building and gate is decorated with lights. Many people visit the Buddhist caves on this occasion. Women greet each other by applying nil (indigo colour powder). This day is celebrated in other educational institutes other than Dr. Babasaheb Ambedkar Marathwada University as well.

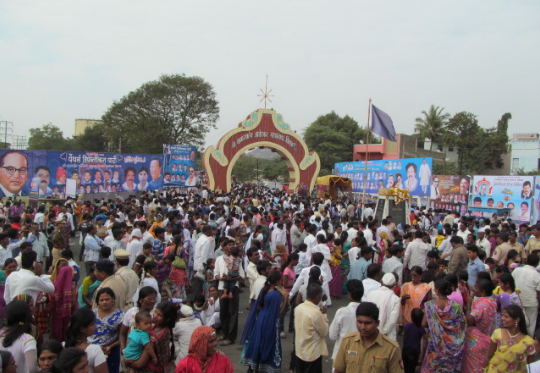
Massive crowd at Dr. Babasaheb Ambedkar Marathwada University gate during Namvistar Din celebrations.

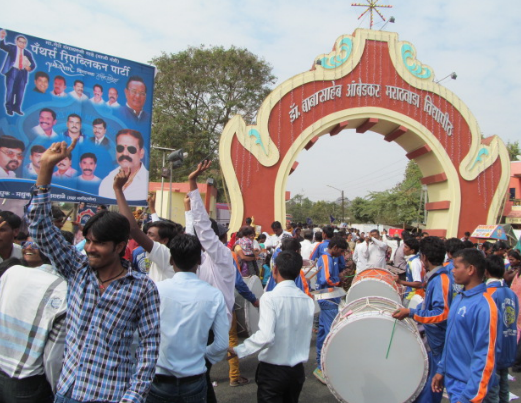
People dancing during the Namvistar Din celebrations at Dr. Babasaheb Ambedkar Marathwada University gate.

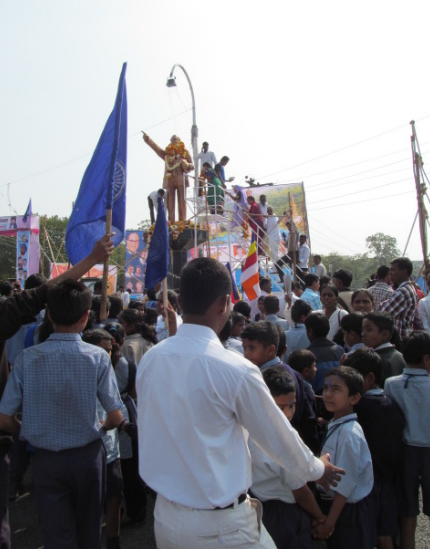
School children pay rich tribute to Dr B R Ambedkar on Namvistar Din.

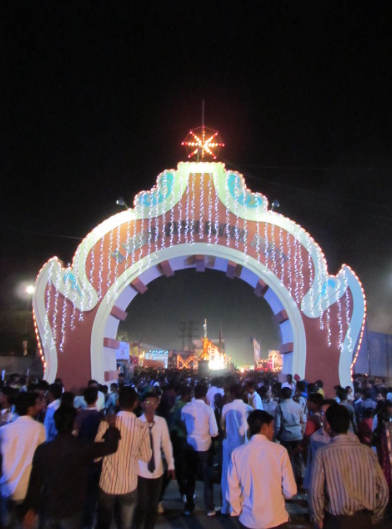
File:Dr. Babasaheb Ambedkar Marathwada University gate on the eve of Namvistar Din celebrations.

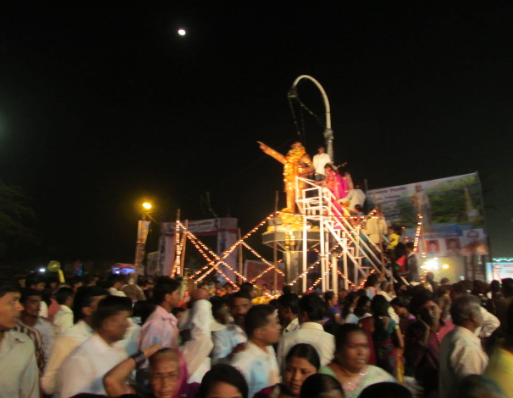
People garland statue of Dr. Babasaheb Ambedkar on Namvistar Din.

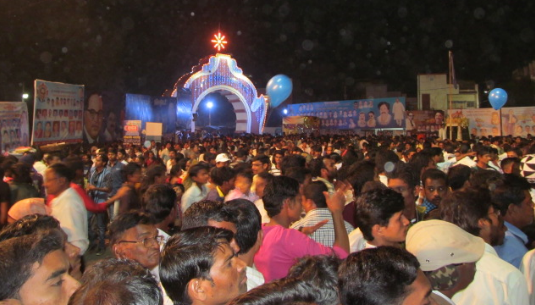
Eve of Namvistar Din.

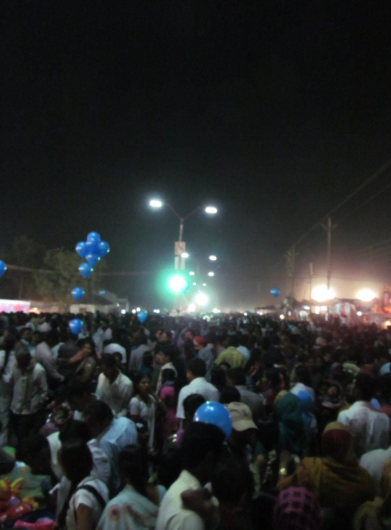
The crowd in Aurangabad during Namvistar Din.

== Legacy ==
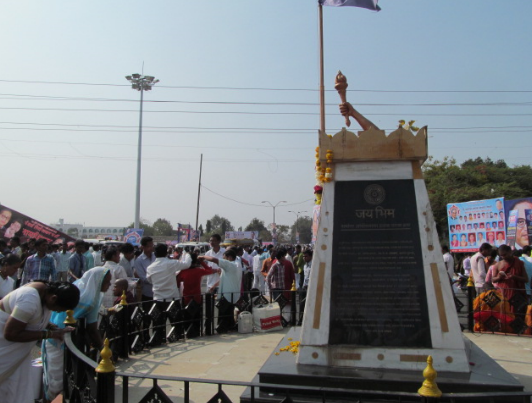
Woman paying homage to martyrs at Namantar Shahid Stambh, which is the Namantar Martyrs Monolith, in front of the Dr. Babasaheb Ambedkar Marathwada University gate.

People come to the university gate to have darshan, which resembles the Sanchi Stupa gate, and leave an offering as if the university were a place of pilgrimage. In 2013, the Nagpur Municipal Corporation erected the Namantar Shahid Smarak (Martyrdom Memorial) dedicated to Dalits who died in the movement at Nagpur.

== See also ==
- The Buddha and His Dhamma
- Bhadant Anand Kausalyayan
- Marathi Buddhists
- Chaitya Bhoomi
- Dalit Buddhist movement
- Caste system in India
- Self-Respect Movement
- Caste politics
- National Campaign on Dalit Human Rights
