= Dr. Babasaheb Ambedkar Marathwada University =

Indian university in Aurangabad, Maharashtra

- Ḍŏ. Bābāsāhēb Āmbēḍakar Marāṭhavāḍā Vidyāpīṭh
- Former name: Marathwada University
- Motto: Knowledge is sacred and is the source of enlightenment
- Type: Public
- Established: 1958 (68 years ago)
- Affiliations: UGC, NAAC, AIU
- Chancellor: Governor of Maharashtra
- Vice-Chancellor: Dr. Vijay J. Fulari
- Location: Aurangabad, India; 19°54′17.88″N 75°18′43.62″E
- Campus: Urban
- Website: bamu.ac.in

Dr. Babasaheb Ambedkar Marathwada University (BAMU), is a public university located in Aurangabad, Maharashtra. It is named after Babasaheb Bhimrao Ambedkar, an Indian social reformer and political leader who chaired the committee that drafted the Constitution of India. The university was established on 23 August 1958. It is spread over 725 acres, making it the largest University in Maharashtra, India, in terms of total area.

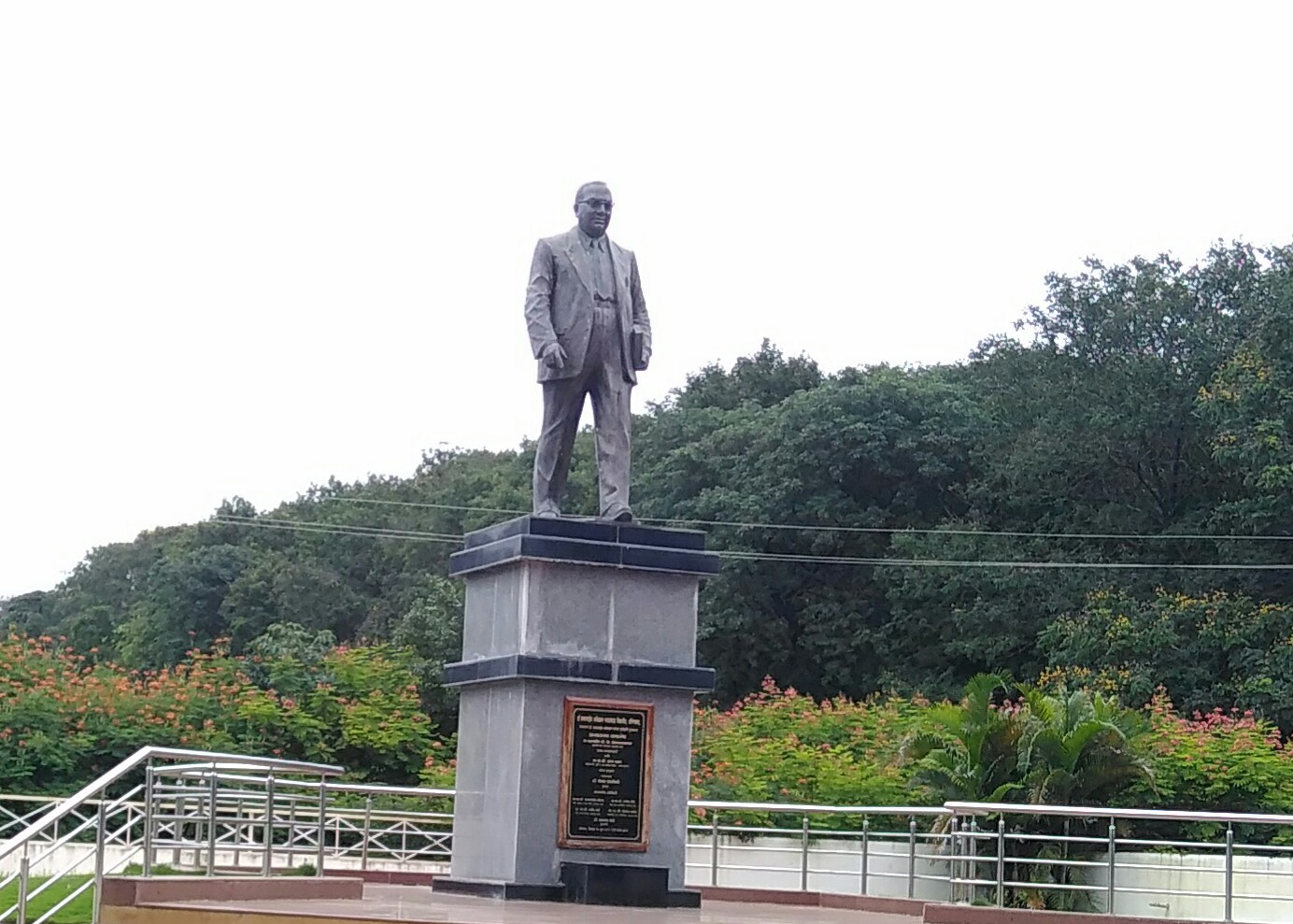
Babasaheb Ambedkar's statue in Dr. Babasaheb Ambedkar Marathwada University

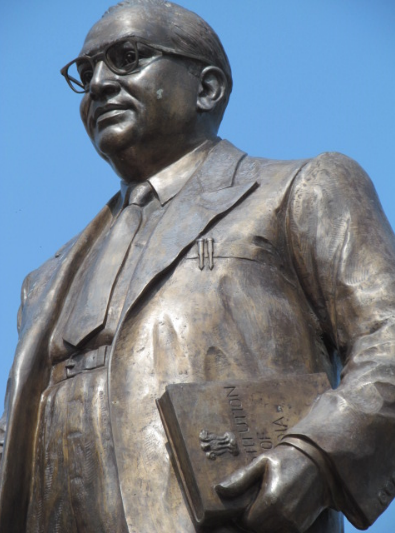
Central statue of Dr Babasaheb Ambedkar in Dr. Babasaheb Ambedkar Marathwada University.

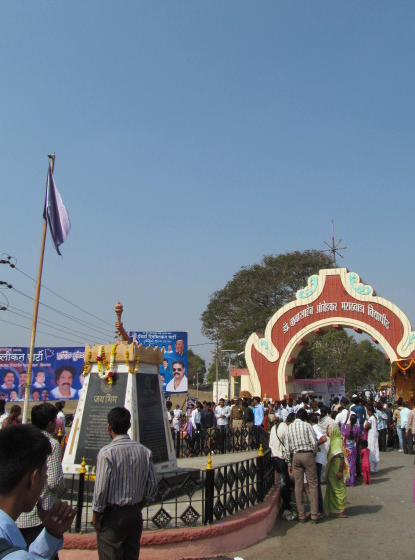
Namantar Shahid Stambh is Namantar martyrs monolith in front of university gate erected in memory of the valour and the sacrifice of Dalit martyrs.

== Namantar Andolan ==
In 1978, the Chief Minister of Maharashtra, the state legislature, and the University administration approved renaming the university after B. R. Ambedkar. This decision was strongly opposed by other communities, resulting in the anti-Dalit pogrom. The Namantar Andolan was the renaming movement organised by Dalits for 16 years. On 14 January 1994, the university was officially renamed as "Dr. Babasaheb Ambedkar Marathwada University."

== Organisation and administration ==
=== Colleges ===
Since establishment, the university has affiliated around 456 colleges across six districts in Maharashtra: Aurangabad, Beed, Jalna, Latur, and Osmanabad, and Parbhani districts.

=== Aurangabad district ===
- AD College of Education
- Chate Business School – CBS
- Chishtiya College of Arts and Science
- Deogiri College, Aurangabad
- Deogiri Institute of Engineering and Management Studies – DIEMS
- Deogiri Institute of Technology and Management Studies – DITMS
- Dnyanjyoti College of Education
- Dr. (Sow) Indirabai Bhaskarrao Pathak Mahila Mahavidyalaya
- Dr. Ambedkar of Law College
- Dr. GY Pathrikar College of Computer Science and Information Technology
- Dr. Rafiq Zakaria College for Women
- Dr. Ram Manohar Lohia Institution's of Bio-Science and Technology
- Dr. Vedprakash Patil Pharmacy College
- DSR College of Education
- Everest Educational Society's Group of Institutions – College of Engineering and Technology
- Foster Development College of Education
- Foster Development School of Management
- Government College of Education
- Government College of Engineering – Aurangabad
- Government College of Pharmacy
- Government Institute of Science
- Government School of Art
- Hi-Tech College of Management and Computer Science
- Hi-Tech Institute of Technology – HIT
- Indraraj College of Arts, Commerce and Science
- Janta Shikshan Prasarak Mandal College of Education
- Jayprakash Narayan B.Ed. College
- Jibran Quadri Institute of Management Sciences and Research – JQIM
- Kohinoor Arts, Commerce and Science College
- Late Pandharinath Patil Institute of Management Studies and Information Technology
- Late Vasantraoji Kale Law College
- Lokseva Education Society's Arts and Science College
- Maharaja Sayajirao Gaikwad College
- Maharashtra Institute of Technology – MIT
- Mahatma Gandhi Mission College of Journalism and Mass Communication
- Mahatma Gandhi Mission Institute of Biosciences and Technology
- Mahatma Gandhi Mission Institute of Management & Research
- Mahatma Gandhi Mission's Institute of Fashion Designing
- Mahatma Gandhi Mission's Jawaharlal Nehru Engineering College – MGM JNEC
- Mahatma Phule College of Education
- Mahatma Phule Master of Education College
- Manikchand Pahade Law College
- Marathwada College of Education
- Marathwada Institute of Management and Research
- Marathwada Sanskrutik Mandal's College of Physical Education
- Maulana Azad College of Arts, Science and Commerce
- Maulana Azad Educational Trust Millennium Institute of Management – MIM
- Milind College of Science
- MSP Mandal's Shivchhatrapati College
- National Arts, Commerce and Science College
- National Institute of Electronics and Information Technology – NIEIT
- Oyster College of Architecture
- Oyster Institute of Pharmacy
- Peoples College of Forensic Science and Cyber Security
- PES College of Engineering
- PES College of Physical Education
- Rajarshi Shahu Institute of Management – RSIM
- Rajesh Bhaiyya Tope College of Pharmacy
- Rashtriya College
- Sant Dnyaneshwar Mahavidyalaya
- Sant Gadge Maharaj College of Education
- Savitribai Phule Women's Engineering College – SPW
- SBES College of Arts and Commerce
- Shivaji Arts, Commerce and Science College
- Shreeyash College of Engineering and Technology – SYCET
- Shri Asaramji Bhandwaldar Arts, Commerce and Science College
- Shri Bhagwan College of Pharmacy
- Shri Dhaneshwari Manav Vikas Mandal's Dhaneshwari Post Graduate College of Education
- Shri Dhaneshwari Manav Vikas Mandal's Dr. Vedprakash Patil Pharmacy College
- Shri Muktananad College
- Shri Sai Institute of Pharmacy and Research
- Shri Sai Janvikas Pratisthan College of Education
- Shrinath College of Education
- Shriyash Institute of Management – SIM
- Sir Sayyed College of Arts, Commerce and Science – SSC
- Talat College of Education
- Tom Patrick Institute of Computer and Information Technology – TPICIT
- V.N. Patil Law College
- Vasantrao Naik Mahavidyalaya
- Veermata Jijau Women's Engineering College
- Vivekanand Arts, Sardar Dalip Singh Commerce and Science College
- YB Chavan College of Pharmacy
- Yeshwantrao Chavan College of Arts, Commerce & Science

=== Beed district ===
- Aditya B.Ed. College
- Aditya Engineering College
- Aditya M.B.A. College
- Anandrao Dhonde Alis Babaji Mahavidyalaya
- Babasaheb Paranjape College of Physical Education
- Government College of Education
- Gurukrupa Institute of Pharmacy
- JSP Mandal's College of Education
- Kholeshwar Mahavidyalaya
- Maharashtra Institute of Information Technology – MIIT
- Mahatma Basaveshwar Education Society's College of Engineering
- Mahila Adhyapak Vidhayalaya D.Ed. College
- Majalgaon Arts, Science and Commerce College
- Manavlok's College of Social Sciences
- Marathwada Shikshan Prasarak Mandal's Balbhim Arts, Science and Commerce College
- Milliya Arts, Science and Management Science College
- MSP Mandal's Law College
- Nagnathappa Halge Engineering College
- Navgan Shikshan Sanstha Rajuri (N) Arts, Commerce College
- Navgan Shikshan Sanstha, Rajuri's College of Physical Education
- NSS College of Physical Education
- Padmabhushan Vasant Dada Patil College – PVPC
- R.B. Attal Arts, Science & Commerce College
- Rajarshi Shahu Mahila Adhyapak Mahavidyalaya
- RB Attal Arts, Science and Commerce College
- S.K. Gandhi Arts, Amolak Science, B.H. Gandhi Commerce College
- Sambhaji Raje College of Library and Management Science
- Sambhaji Raje Management Science College
- Shetkari Shikshan Prasarak Mandal's College of Education – D.Ed.
- Shri Balaji Shikshan Prasarak Mandal's College of Education
- Shri Panditguru Pardikar Mahavidyalaya
- Shri Siddheshwar Mahavidyalaya
- SSP Mandal's College of Education
- Swami Ramanand Teerth Mahavidyalaya
- Tulsi College of Computer Science and Information Technology
- Vaidyanath College
- Vasant Mahavidyalaya
- Vasantrao Kale College of Journalism and Computer Science
- Vasundhara College
- Yogeshwari Mahavidyalaya

=== Jalna district ===
- Dankuwar Mahila Mahavidyalaya
- Dharti Janseva Pratisthan's College of Education
- Matsyodari Shikshan Sanstha College of Education
- Matsyodari Shikshan Sanstha College of Physical Education
- Matsyodari Shikshan Sanstha's College of Engineering and Technology
- Matysodari Shikshan Sanstha's Arts, Commerce and Science College
- Nirmal Krida and Samaj Prabodhan Trust Arts, Science and Commerce College
- Nirmal Krida and Samaj Prabodhan Trust Institute of Management
- Nirmal Krida and Samaj Prabodhan Trust's Institute of Computer Science and Management – ICSM
- Om Shanti College of Education
- Rajureshwar Arts, Commerce and Science College
- Raosaheb Patil Danve College of Pharmacy
- Rashtramata Indira Gandhi Arts, Commerce and Science College
- Rashtramata Indira Gandhi Mahavidyalaya
- Siddharth Arts, Commerce and Science College
- Swami Vivekanand Senior College

=== Latur district ===
- MAEER'S Smt. Prayag Akka Karad D.Ed. College

=== Osmanabad district ===
- Advance Computer College
- KT Patil College of Education
- KT Patil College of Engineering and Technology
- KT Patil College of MBA
- KT Patil College of Pharmacy
- R.P. College of Pharmacy
- Ramkrishna Paramhansa Mahavidyalaya
- Sanjeevan College of Home Science
- Shikshan Maharshi Dnyandeo Mohekar Mahavidyalaya – SMD
- Shramjivi College of Education
- Shri Chhatrapati Shivaji College
- Shri Madhavrao Patil Mahavidyalaya
- Shri Tulja Bhavani College of Engineering
- Shrikrishna Mahavidyalaya
- Terna Public Charitable Trust's College of Engineering
- Venkatesh Mahajan Senior College

=== Parbhani district ===
- Late Shankarrao Gutte Gramin Arts, Commerce and Science college

== Library ==
Knowledge Resource Centre is the main library of the university. The library was founded in the 1958 as the Varsity library. The university library houses books dating back to the 1600s. Recently, the Knowledge Resource Centre subscribed to the World E-book Library through a Noida-based company, which will enable students to access over 300,000 e-books including journals and other documents.

Babasaheb Ambedkar Marathwada University

== Student halls of residence ==
There are separate halls of residence for both males and females enrolled at the university.

== See also ==
- Marathwada University Ground
