= List of State Protected Monuments in Maharashtra =

This is a list of State Protected Monuments as officially reported by and available through the website of the Archaeological Survey of India in the Indian state of Maharashtra. The monument identifier is a combination of the abbreviation of the subdivision of the list (state, ASI circle) and the numbering as published on the website of the ASI. 244 State Protected Monuments have been recognized by the ASI in Maharashtra. Besides the State Protected Monuments, also the Monuments of National Importance in this state might be relevant.

== List of state protected monuments ==
SL. No.	Description	Location	Address	District	Coordinates	Image
S-MH-1	Kharda Fort	Khardi, Jamkhed		Ahmednagar	18°37′59″N 75°28′29″E	Kharda Fort
S-MH-2	Gadhi (Birth Place of Aahiliyabai Holkar)	Chaundi, Jamkhed		Ahmednagar	18°34′19″N 75°11′14″E	Upload Photo
S-MH-3	Raghaveshwar Mahadev Temple	Kumbhari, Kopargaon		Ahmednagar	19°54′21″N 74°24′47″E	Upload Photo
S-MH-4	Mahadeva Temple	Chaundi, Jamkhed		Ahmednagar	18°34′18″N 75°11′09″E	Upload Photo
S-MH-5	Chaundeshwari Temple	Chaundi, Jamkhed		Ahmednagar	18°34′17″N 75°11′10″E	Upload Photo
S-MH-6	Lakshmi Temple	Shri Gonda		Ahmednagar	18°36′56″N 74°41′54″E	Upload Photo
S-MH-7	Hari Naryana Math	Benwadi		Ahmednagar	18°29′46″N 74°58′28″E	Upload Photo
S-MH-8	Ahilyabai Birth- place	Chaundi, Jamkhed		Ahmednagar	18°34′19″N 75°11′14″E	Upload Photo
S-MH-9	Birthplace of Senapati Bapat	Parner		Ahmednagar	19°00′09″N 74°26′18″E	Upload Photo
S-MH-10	Raghobadada vada	Kopergaon		Ahmednagar	19°52′50″N 74°28′52″E	Upload Photo
S-MH-11	Khan-I-Jahan Bagh (Laal Bagh)	Khuldabad		Aurangabad	20°00′17″N 75°11′26″E	Upload Photo
S-MH-12	Baitulwadi fort	Baitulwadi, Songaon		Aurangabad	20°33′15″N 75°37′18″E	Baitulwadi fort More images
S-MH-13	Taltam Fort (Janjala Fort)	Jinjala, Songaon		Aurangabad	20°33′42″N 75°34′46″E	Upload Photo
S-MH-14	Antur Fort	Kannad, Nagapur	Gautada forest, Maharashtra 431147, India	Aurangabad	20°25′41″N 75°14′07″E	Antur Fort
S-MH-15	Ghatotkach Lena	Janjala	18 km to the west of Ajantha, near Jinjala village, Maharashtra 431120, India	Aurangabad	20°33′10″N 75°35′06″E	Ghatotkach Lena
S-MH-16	Rudreshwar Lena	Vetalwadi, Soigaon		Aurangabad	20°33′28″N 75°38′42″E	Upload Photo
S-MH-17	Jogeshwari Devi Lena	Sillod City		Aurangabad	20°29′14″N 75°26′32″E	Upload Photo
S-MH-18	Khandoba Temple	Satara		Aurangabad	19°50′27″N 75°19′28″E	Upload Photo
S-MH-19	Nageshwar Temple	Rahimabad, Sellod		Aurangabad	20°20′47″N 75°43′28″E	Upload Photo
S-MH-20	Vadeshwar Mahadeva Temple	Ambhai, Sellod		Aurangabad	20°28′18″N 75°34′05″E	Upload Photo
S-MH-21	Soneri Mahal	Aurangabad City	Near Dr Babasaheb Ambedkar Marathwada University Campus, Aurangabad city, Maharashtra 431004, India	Aurangabad	19°54′24″N 75°18′33″E	Soneri Mahal
S-MH-22	Shah Ganj Masjid	Shah Ganj Market	Aurangabad city	Aurangabad	19°53′14″N 75°20′06″E	Upload Photo
S-MH-23	Lal Masjid	Townhall, Makkai Gate	Aurangabad city	Aurangabad	19°53′31″N 75°19′22″E	Upload Photo
S-MH-24	Kali Masjid	City Chowk	Aurangabad city	Aurangabad	19°53′19″N 75°20′23″E	Upload Photo
S-MH-25	Chowk Masjid	City Chowk	Aurangabad city	Aurangabad	19°53′19″N 75°19′50″E	Chowk Masjid
S-MH-26	Bhadkal Darwaza	Near Naukhanda (Naan Khan Palace) College	Aurangabad city	Aurangabad	19°53′19″N 75°19′18″E	Bhadkal Darwaza
S-MH-27	Makkai Darwaza	Ghati Hospital, Near BB ka maqbara	Aurangabad city	Aurangabad	19°53′39″N 75°19′06″E	Makkai Darwaza
S-MH-28	Dilli Darwaza	Near Subedari Guest house	VIP road, Himayat Bagh	Aurangabad	19°53′51″N 75°20′16″E	Dilli Darwaza
S-MH-29	Naukhand Darwaza	Near Bhadkal Gate(Darwaza)	Naukhanda College of Women's	Aurangabad	19°53′18″N 75°19′11″E	Upload Photo
S-MH-30	Paanchakki	Near PES college	Aurangabad city	Aurangabad	19°53′22″N 75°18′56″E	Paanchakki
S-MH-31	Shahi Hamam	Daulatabad		Aurangabad	19°56′49″N 75°12′56″E	Upload Photo
S-MH-32	Inscribed Rock			Aurangabad		Upload Photo
S-MH-33	Jami Masjid of Asafjahan I	Ajanta, Sillod		Aurangabad	20°31′56″N 75°44′47″E	Upload Photo
S-MH-34	Baradari of Salarjung	Ajanta, Sillod		Aurangabad	20°31′49″N 75°44′45″E	Upload Photo
S-MH-35	Ajanta Sarai	Ajanta, Sillod		Aurangabad	20°32′04″N 75°44′49″E	Upload Photo
S-MH-36	Fardapur Sarai	Fardapur, Soigaon		Aurangabad	20°35′05″N 75°43′21″E	Upload Photo
S-MH-37	Bani Begum Bagh	Khuldabad	Khuldabad	Aurangabad	20°00′19″N 75°11′19″E	Upload Photo
S-MH-38	Munim Bagh	Khuldabad		Aurangabad	20°00′15″N 75°11′25″E	Upload Photo
S-MH-39	Asaf Jahan's Tomb	Khuldabad		Aurangabad	20°00′19″N 75°11′25″E	Upload Photo
S-MH-40	Prince Azam Shah's Tomb	Khuldabad		Aurangabad	20°00′18″N 75°11′30″E	Upload Photo
S-MH-41	Shahid Nasir Jung's Tomb	Khuldabad		Aurangabad	20°00′19″N 75°11′25″E	Upload Photo
S-MH-42	Abdul Hasan Shah's Tomb	Khuldabad		Aurangabad	20°00′54″N 75°11′00″E	Upload Photo
S-MH-43	Nakkar Hussain's Tomb			Aurangabad		Upload Photo
S-MH-44	Malojiraje Gadhi	Verul		Aurangabad	20°01′30″N 75°09′59″E	Upload Photo
S-MH-45	Image of Narasimha	Paithan		Aurangabad	19°27′53″N 75°22′57″E	Upload Photo
S-MH-46	Image of Shesashayi	Paithan		Aurangabad	19°27′53″N 75°22′56″E	Upload Photo
S-MH-47	Tirthastambha	Paithan		Aurangabad	19°27′55″N 75°23′01″E	Upload Photo
S-MH-48	Dharur Fort		Dharur	Beed district	18°49′07″N 76°06′07″E	Upload Photo
S-MH-49	Shivleni Caves / Jogaai Sabha Mandap	Ambajogai	Shivleni, Mukundraj Samadhi Road, Ambajogai	Beed	18°44′23″N 76°23′10″E	Shivleni Caves / Jogaai Sabha Mandap More images
S-MH-50	Kankaleshwar Temple		Beed city	Beed	18°59′15″N 75°46′05″E	Kankaleshwar Temple
S-MH-51	Khandeshwari Temple (Renuka Mata Temple)		Beed city	Beed	19°00′04″N 75°46′33″E	Upload Photo
S-MH-52	Amleshwar Temple	Ambejogai		Beed	18°45′06″N 76°23′54″E	Upload Photo
S-MH-53	Kholeshwar Temple	Ambejogai		Beed	18°44′16″N 76°23′24″E	Upload Photo
S-MH-54	Kedareshwar Mahadeva Temple	Dharmpuri		Beed	18°43′58″N 76°38′19″E	Upload Photo
S-MH-55	Mausoleum Shahenshah Balli	Beed		Beed	18°59′14″N 75°46′27″E	Upload Photo
S-MH-56	Mausoleum of Peer Balasaheb	Beed		Beed	18°59′31″N 75°44′09″E	Upload Photo
S-MH-57	Rajuri Darwaza	Beed		Beed	18°59′22″N 75°45′24″E	Upload Photo
S-MH-58	Rana Kumbha			Beed		Upload Photo
S-MH-59	Neelkantheshwar Temple	Sindkhed Raja		Buldhana district	19°57′04″N 76°07′25″E	Upload Photo
S-MH-60	Motitalava	Sindkhed Raja		Buldhana	19°56′39″N 76°06′27″E	Upload Photo
S-MH-61	Rajvada of Lakhuji Jadhav	Sindkhed Raja	Deulgaon Raja	Buldhana	19°57′14″N 76°07′38″E	Upload Photo
S-MH-62	Rangmahal	Sindkhed Raja		Buldhana	19°57′09″N 76°07′25″E	Upload Photo
S-MH-63	Savkarvada	Sindkhed Raja		Buldhana	19°57′14″N 76°07′30″E	Upload Photo
S-MH-64	Someshwar Temple	Rajura		Chandrapur district	19°46′35″N 79°21′30″E	Upload Photo
S-MH-65	Vishnu Temple	Manikgad, Korpana		Chandrapur	19°40′13″N 79°07′35″E	Upload Photo
S-MH-66	Anchaleshwar Temple	Chandrapur		Chandrapur	19°56′45″N 79°18′11″E	Upload Photo
S-MH-67	Shankar Temple	Bhisee, Chimur		Chandrapur	20°38′01″N 79°24′12″E	Upload Photo
S-MH-68	Bhavani Temple	Bhatala		Chandrapur	20°20′34″N 79°04′43″E	Upload Photo
S-MH-69	Dolmen Prehistoric Site	Hirapur		Chandrapur	20°37′25″N 79°31′47″E	Upload Photo
S-MH-70	Garuda Stambha	Manikgad, Korpan		Chandrapur		Upload Photo
S-MH-71	Lalinga Fort	Dhule		Dhule district	20°48′43″N 74°44′22″E	Lalinga Fort More images
S-MH-72	KalaikaDevi Temple	Shirud		Dhule	20°44′05″N 74°53′34″E	Upload Photo
S-MH-73	Haraba Temple	Methi		Dhule	21°14′39″N 74°38′22″E	Upload Photo
S-MH-74	Bhavani Temple	Methi		Dhule	21°14′49″N 74°38′13″E	Upload Photo
S-MH-75	Vishnu Temple	Methi		Dhule	21°14′48″N 74°38′13″E	Upload Photo
S-MH-76	Dharavi Fort	Dharavi		Greater Mumbai	19°02′48″N 72°51′52″E	Dharavi Fort More images
S-MH-77	St. George fort	Near CST		Greater Mumbai	18°56′27″N 72°50′15″E	St. George fort More images
S-MH-78	Mahim Fort	Mahim		Greater Mumbai	19°02′31″N 72°50′17″E	Mahim Fort More images
S-MH-79	Bandra Fort	Bandra		Greater Mumbai	19°02′31″N 72°49′06″E	Bandra Fort More images
S-MH-80	Shivadi Fort	Sewri		Greater Mumbai	19°00′02″N 72°51′36″E	Shivadi Fort More images
S-MH-81	Gateway of India	Apollo Bunder, Kolaba		Greater Mumbai	18°55′19″N 72°50′05″E	Gateway of India More images
S-MH-82	Banganga Talav	Walkeshwar		Greater Mumbai	18°56′43″N 72°47′38″E	Banganga Talav More images
S-MH-83	August Kranti Maidan	Near Nana Chowk		Greater Mumbai	18°57′45″N 72°48′38″E	August Kranti Maidan More images
S-MH-84	Amargad Fort			Hingoli district		Upload Photo
S-MH-85	Padlela Fort Pethvadgaon	Anthali, Basmat		Hingoli	19°31′24″N 77°21′29″E	Upload Photo
S-MH-86	Sant Namdeva Birthplace and Narsimha Temple	Narsi		Hingoli	19°45′41″N 77°00′27″E	Upload Photo
S-MH-87	Hindu Temple	Aral		Hingoli	19°20′03″N 76°59′44″E	Upload Photo
S-MH-88	Nagnath Temple	Aundha Nagnath		Hingoli	19°32′14″N 77°02′28″E	Nagnath Temple More images
S-MH-89	Pancha Pandava temple	Aundhha		Hingoli		Upload Photo
S-MH-90	Garhi	Tondapur, Jamner		Jalgaon district		Upload Photo
S-MH-91	Parola Fort	Parola		Jalgaon	20°52′38″N 75°06′57″E	Upload Photo
S-MH-92	Shiva temple	Tondapur		Jalgaon	20°34′27″N 75°48′24″E	Upload Photo
S-MH-93	Pandava Vada Mosque	Erandol		Jalgaon	20°55′16″N 75°19′30″E	Upload Photo
S-MH-94	Ves	Amalner		Jalgaon	21°02′33″N 75°03′53″E	Upload Photo
S-MH-95	Bhokardan Leni	Bhokardan		Jalna district	20°16′14″N 75°45′48″E	Upload Photo
S-MH-96	Mahadeva Temple	Anva		Jalna	20°24′59″N 75°46′58″E	Upload Photo
S-MH-97	Mahadeva Temple	Jamkhed		Jalna	19°38′32″N 75°39′50″E	Upload Photo
S-MH-98	Vishalgarh	Vishalgad		Kolhapur district	16°54′21″N 73°44′45″E	Vishalgarh More images
S-MH-99	Rangna Fort	Narur		Kolhapur	16°04′46″N 73°50′40″E	Rangna Fort More images
S-MH-100	Bhudargad	Bidri		Kolhapur	16°15′09″N 74°08′27″E	Bhudargad More images
S-MH-101	Pandavadara Leni (Shaiva)	Badewadi		Kolhapur	16°49′27″N 74°02′50″E	Upload Photo
S-MH-102	Mahadeva Temple	Aare		Kolhapur	16°38′06″N 74°07′54″E	Upload Photo
S-MH-103	Lakshmi Vilas Palace	Kolhapur		Kolhapur	16°43′55″N 74°14′21″E	Lakshmi Vilas Palace More images
S-MH-104	Samadhi of Amatya Ramchandrapant	Panhala Fort		Kolhapur	16°48′34″N 74°06′44″E	Upload Photo
S-MH-105	Ausa Fort	Ausa		Latur district	18°14′27″N 76°29′59″E	Ausa Fort More images
S-MH-106	Udgir Fort	Udgir		Latur	18°24′07″N 77°07′05″E	Udgir Fort
S-MH-107	Kharosa Leni	Kharosa		Latur	18°09′26″N 76°40′42″E	Kharosa Leni More images
S-MH-108	Devi Temple	Gangapur		Latur	18°21′05″N 76°31′17″E	Upload Photo
S-MH-109	Jami Masjid	Ausa		Latur	18°14′56″N 76°29′56″E	Upload Photo
S-MH-110	Bagh-e-Hissam	Udgir		Latur	18°23′13″N 77°06′19″E	Upload Photo
S-MH-111	Umred Fort	Umred		Nagpur	20°51′28″N 79°19′10″E	Upload Photo
S-MH-112	Nagardhan	Nagardhan	Tehsil Ramtek	Nagpur district	21°20′13″N 79°18′56″E	Nagardhan More images
S-MH-113	Chandramauli temple			Nagpur		Upload Photo
S-MH-114	Panchashikhari Temple			Nagpur		Upload Photo
S-MH-115	Datta Temple			Nagpur		Upload Photo
S-MH-116	Harihara Temple			Nagpur		Upload Photo
S-MH-117	Deekshabhoomi	Nagpur	Ramdaspeth	Nagpur	21°07′42″N 79°04′01″E	Deekshabhoomi More images
S-MH-118	Tajbagh	Nagpur	Dighori, Umrer Road	Nagpur	21°06′53″N 79°07′24″E	Upload Photo
S-MH-119	Chhatri	Nagpur		Nagpur	21°08′20″N 79°05′23″E	Upload Photo
S-MH-120	Chhatri			Nagpur		Upload Photo
S-MH-121	Jagannath Temple	Ramtek		Nagpur	21°23′30″N 79°20′56″E	Upload Photo
S-MH-122	Mahadeva Temple			Nagpur		Upload Photo
S-MH-123	Shiva Temple			Nagpur		Upload Photo
S-MH-124	Shiva Temple			Nagpur		Upload Photo
S-MH-125	Shiva Temple			Nagpur		Upload Photo
S-MH-126	Shiva Temple			Nagpur		Upload Photo
S-MH-127	Shiva Temple			Nagpur		Upload Photo
S-MH-128	Mahadeva Temple			Nagpur		Upload Photo
S-MH-129	Shiva Temple			Nagpur		Upload Photo
S-MH-130	Shiva Temple			Nagpur		Upload Photo
S-MH-131	Mahadeva Temple			Nagpur		Upload Photo
S-MH-132	Ganesha Temple			Nagpur		Upload Photo
S-MH-133	Vitthala Temple			Nagpur		Upload Photo
S-MH-134	Datta Temple			Nagpur		Upload Photo
S-MH-135	Dharmashala			Nagpur		Upload Photo
S-MH-136	Samadhi of Ranisaheb			Nagpur	21°08′21″N 79°06′13″E	Upload Photo
S-MH-137	Ram Ganesh Gadkari Memorial	Saoner		Nagpur	21°23′01″N 78°55′12″E	Upload Photo
S-MH-138	Sarasvati Mata Payarikund	Katol		Nagpur	21°16′00″N 78°35′11″E	Upload Photo
S-MH-139	Archaeological Site	Adam		Nagpur	20°59′51″N 79°27′15″E	Upload Photo
S-MH-140	Archaeological Site Adam buddha stupa	Adam		Nagpur	20°59′56″N 79°27′26″E	Upload Photo
S-MH-141	Bholahudki Tekdi	Mandhal	Mandhal	Nagpur	20°56′25″N 79°28′00″E	Upload Photo
S-MH-142	Eidgah			Nanded district		Upload Photo
S-MH-143	Nandagiri Fort	Nanded		Nanded	19°08′30″N 77°19′30″E	Upload Photo
S-MH-144	Kandhar Fort	Kandhar		Nanded	18°52′27″N 77°12′05″E	Kandhar Fort More images
S-MH-145	Mahur Fort	Mahurgad		Nanded	19°50′15″N 77°55′49″E	Mahur Fort More images
S-MH-146	Pandava Leni			Nanded		Upload Photo
S-MH-147	Brahmani Lene	Shiur		Nanded	19°40′44″N 77°27′46″E	Upload Photo
S-MH-148	Parvati Temple	Hottal		Nanded	18°28′46″N 77°33′37″E	Upload Photo
S-MH-149	Mahadeva Temple	Hottal		Nanded	18°28′45″N 77°33′37″E	Upload Photo
S-MH-150	Parameshwar Temple	Hottal		Nanded	18°28′38″N 77°33′35″E	Upload Photo
S-MH-151	Nandi temple and Kunda	Hottal		Nanded	18°28′43″N 77°33′51″E	Upload Photo
S-MH-152	Narasimha temple and Image	Shelgaon		Nanded	18°36′47″N 77°43′31″E	Upload Photo
S-MH-153	Ankaleshwar Mahadeva Temple			Nanded		Upload Photo
S-MH-154	Renukadevi Temple	Mahurgad		Nanded	19°49′57″N 77°55′24″E	Upload Photo
S-MH-155	Mahadeva Temple			Nanded		Upload Photo
S-MH-156	Bhoganarsimha Temple	Raher		Nanded	18°53′42″N 77°40′11″E	Upload Photo
S-MH-157	Ksetrapala Temple Ruins			Nanded		Upload Photo
S-MH-158	Archaeological Remains of Temple and River			Nanded		Upload Photo
S-MH-159	Mauli Tale/Matritirth	Mahurgad		Nanded	19°51′04″N 77°55′35″E	Upload Photo
S-MH-160	Hathikhana	Mahurgad		Nanded	19°50′58″N 77°55′29″E	Upload Photo
S-MH-161	Sarfaraz Khan's Masjid	Biloli		Nanded	18°46′24″N 77°43′21″E	Upload Photo
S-MH-162	Mohida Tarf (Haveli)			Nandurbar district		Upload Photo
S-MH-163	Malegaon Fort	Malegaon		Nashik district	20°32′44″N 74°31′49″E	Malegaon Fort More images
S-MH-164	Ankai- Tankai Fort	Ankai		Nashik	20°11′30″N 74°27′18″E	Upload Photo
S-MH-165	Jain Leni (Kalika Mandir)	Chandwad		Nashik	20°19′45″N 74°15′17″E	Upload Photo
S-MH-166	Sundar Narayan temple	Nashik		Nashik	20°00′29″N 73°47′24″E	Sundar Narayan temple More images
S-MH-167	Neelkantheshwar Mahadeva temple	Nashik		Nashik	20°00′23″N 73°47′32″E	Neelkantheshwar Mahadeva temple More images
S-MH-168	Tatoba Temple	Odha		Nashik	19°59′46″N 73°54′20″E	Upload Photo
S-MH-169	Mukteshwar Mahadeva Temple	Sinnar		Nashik	19°50′54″N 74°00′42″E	Upload Photo
S-MH-170	Vaijeshwar Mahadeva Temple	Wavi		Nashik	19°48′00″N 74°14′59″E	Upload Photo
S-MH-171	Renuka Temple	Chandwad		Nashik	20°20′44″N 74°15′01″E	Renuka Temple More images
S-MH-172	Vishnu Temple	Dhodambe		Nashik	20°19′54″N 74°03′32″E	Upload Photo
S-MH-173	Brahmanaleshwar Temple			Nashik		Upload Photo
S-MH-174	Raghaveshwar Mahadeva temple	Chichodi		Nashik	20°01′15″N 74°25′51″E	Upload Photo
S-MH-175	Mahadeva Temple	Deolane		Nashik	20°37′57″N 74°18′24″E	Mahadeva Temple
S-MH-176	Ballaleshwar Temple	Trimbak		Nashik	19°55′58″N 73°31′37″E	Upload Photo
S-MH-177	Birthplace of Savarkar	Bhagur		Nashik	19°52′31″N 73°50′00″E	Upload Photo
S-MH-178	Vihir (Savarkar Memorial)	Bhagur		Nashik	19°52′28″N 73°50′02″E	Vihir (Savarkar Memorial)
S-MH-179	Sarkarvada	Nashik		Nashik	20°00′20″N 73°47′26″E	Sarkarvada More images
S-MH-180	Rang Mahal	Chandwad		Nashik	20°19′48″N 74°14′43″E	Rang Mahal More images
S-MH-181	Pathri Fort	Pathri		Parbhani district	19°15′04″N 76°25′17″E	Upload Photo
S-MH-182	Vadgaon Fort			Parbhani		Upload Photo
S-MH-183	Gokulaeshwar Temple	Charthana		Parbhani	19°37′35″N 76°32′34″E	Upload Photo
S-MH-184	Ganapati temple	Charthana		Parbhani	19°37′48″N 76°32′25″E	Upload Photo
S-MH-185	Jod Mahadeva Temple	Charthana		Parbhani	19°37′40″N 76°32′20″E	Upload Photo
S-MH-186	Khurachi Aai Temple			Parbhani		Upload Photo
S-MH-187	Unkdeshwar Temple	Charthana		Parbhani	19°37′36″N 76°32′21″E	Upload Photo
S-MH-188	Narasimha temple	Charthana		Parbhani	19°37′37″N 76°32′18″E	Upload Photo
S-MH-189	Mahadeva Temple			Parbhani		Upload Photo
S-MH-190	Renu Vihara Temple			Parbhani		Upload Photo
S-MH-191	Jain Temple	Charthana		Parbhani	19°37′46″N 76°32′24″E	Upload Photo
S-MH-192	Jain Temple	Charthana		Parbhani	19°37′37″N 76°32′19″E	Upload Photo
S-MH-193	Mahadeva Temple	Erandeshwar		Parbhani	19°17′45″N 76°57′12″E	Upload Photo
S-MH-194	Sant Janabaichi Samadhi	Gangakhed		Parbhani	18°57′59″N 76°44′53″E	Upload Photo
S-MH-195	Deepmala	Charthana		Parbhani	19°37′37″N 76°32′18″E	Upload Photo
S-MH-196	Jami Masjid			Parbhani		Upload Photo
S-MH-197	Roshan Khan's Tomb	Parbhani		Parbhani	19°16′13″N 76°46′01″E	Upload Photo
S-MH-198	Jami Masjid			Parbhani		Upload Photo
S-MH-199	Torna Fort	Charhat Wadi		Pune district	18°16′34″N 73°37′22″E	Torna Fort More images
S-MH-200	Rajgad	Pune		Pune	18°14′48″N 73°40′56″E	Rajgad More images
S-MH-201	Sinhagad	Thoptewadi		Pune	18°21′59″N 73°45′21″E	Sinhagad More images
S-MH-202	Koirigad	Aamby Valley City		Pune	18°37′16″N 73°23′09″E	Koirigad More images
S-MH-203	Mahadeva Temple	Pune		Pune	18°36′08″N 73°47′58″E	Upload Photo
S-MH-204	Nageshwar Temple	Pune		Pune	18°31′16″N 73°51′48″E	Nageshwar Temple More images
S-MH-205	Kukadeshwar Temple	Pur		Pune	19°14′25″N 73°43′18″E	Kukadeshwar Temple More images
S-MH-206	Narasimha Temple	Nira Narasingpur		Pune	17°58′15″N 75°07′55″E	Narasimha Temple More images
S-MH-207	Shri Khandoba Temple Sonkul	Jejuri		Pune	18°16′20″N 74°09′38″E	Shri Khandoba Temple Sonkul More images
S-MH-208	Mahatma Phule Vada	Pune		Pune	18°30′25″N 73°51′50″E	Mahatma Phule Vada More images
S-MH-209	Vishrambagh Vada	Pune		Pune	18°30′49″N 73°51′11″E	Vishrambagh Vada More images
S-MH-210	St. Chrispin Home	Pune		Pune	18°30′30″N 73°49′55″E	St. Chrispin Home More images
S-MH-211	Samadhi of Tanaji Malusare	Sinhagad		Pune	18°21′53″N 73°45′17″E	Samadhi of Tanaji Malusare More images
S-MH-212	Samadhi of Sambhaji Maharaja	Vadhu Budruk		Pune	18°39′53″N 74°02′18″E	Samadhi of Sambhaji Maharaja More images
S-MH-213	Grave of Mastani	Malwadi Agarkarwadi		Pune	18°50′10″N 74°03′19″E	Grave of Mastani More images
S-MH-214	Sardar Kanhoji Jedhe Vada	Kari		Pune	18°04′29″N 73°45′27″E	Sardar Kanhoji Jedhe Vada More images
S-MH-215	Hutatma Rajguru Vada	Rajgurunagar		Pune	18°51′03″N 73°52′59″E	Hutatma Rajguru Vada More images
S-MH-216	Samadhi of Sarkhel Kanhoji Angre	Alibag		Raigad	18°38′43″N 72°52′31″E	Samadhi of Sarkhel Kanhoji Angre More images
S-MH-217	Birthplace of Vasudeva Balwant Phadke	Shirdhon		Raigad	18°55′51″N 73°07′51″E	Upload Photo
S-MH-218	Rasalgad	rasalgad		Ratnagiri	17°45′56″N 73°30′42″E	Rasalgad More images
S-MH-219	Buddhist Leni	Panhale Kazi	Panhale Kazi Village, Near Bank of Kodjai River, Maharashtra 415711	Ratnagiri	17°38′44″N 73°14′40″E	Buddhist Leni More images
S-MH-220	Birthplace of Lokmanya Tilak	Ratnagiri		Ratnagiri	16°59′47″N 73°17′27″E	Birthplace of Lokmanya Tilak More images
S-MH-221	Thibaw Palace	Ratnagiri		Ratnagiri	16°59′01″N 73°18′41″E	Thibaw Palace More images
S-MH-222	Samadhi of Raja and Rani of Thiba	Ratnagiri		Ratnagiri	16°59′25″N 73°19′16″E	Upload Photo
S-MH-223	Kalammadevi Temple	Kalamwadi		Sangli district	17°05′39″N 74°11′42″E	Upload Photo
S-MH-224	Birthplace of Yashwantrao Chavhan	Deorashtre		Sangli	17°10′01″N 74°23′05″E	Upload Photo
S-MH-225	Bhiravnath Temple	Kikali		Satara district	17°51′12″N 74°00′39″E	Upload Photo
S-MH-226	Vasudeva Temple Math			Satara		Upload Photo
S-MH-227	Samadhi of Sarsenapati Hambirao Mohite	Talbid		Satara	17°20′19″N 74°06′41″E	Samadhi of Sarsenapati Hambirao Mohite More images
S-MH-228	Birthplace of Savitribai Phule	Naigaon		Satara	18°06′32″N 73°57′48″E	Upload Photo
S-MH-229	Adalatvada	Satara		Satara	17°40′37″N 73°59′30″E	Adalatvada More images
S-MH-230	Bharatgad	Masure		Sindhudurg district	16°10′17″N 73°29′57″E	Bharatgad More images
S-MH-231	Dutch Vakhar	Vengurla		Sindhudurg	15°51′34″N 73°37′49″E	Dutch Vakhar More images
S-MH-232	Sangameshwar and Muralidhar Temple	Kudal		Solapur district	17°22′50″N 75°53′51″E	Upload Photo
S-MH-233	Mahadeva Temple	Solapur		Solapur	17°40′21″N 75°54′18″E	Upload Photo
S-MH-234	Shirgavcha Fort	Shirgaon		Thane district	19°41′46″N 72°42′49″E	Shirgavcha Fort More images
S-MH-235	Khandeshwari Lene	Amane		Thane	19°18′49″N 73°08′11″E	Upload Photo
S-MH-236	Naldurga Fort	Aliyabad		Dharashiv district	17°49′02″N 76°17′22″E	Naldurga Fort More images
S-MH-237	Paranda Fort	Paranda		Dharashiv	18°16′15″N 75°27′15″E	Paranda Fort More images
S-MH-238	Dharashiva Leni	Ghatangri		Dharashiv	18°11′45″N 76°00′35″E	Dharashiva Leni More images
S-MH-239	Uttaraeshwar temple	Ter		Dharashiv	18°19′19″N 76°08′31″E	Uttaraeshwar temple More images
S-MH-240	Trivikram Temple	Ter		Dharashiv	18°19′11″N 76°08′30″E	Trivikram Temple More images
S-MH-241	Bhavani Temple	Tuljapur		Dharashiv	18°00′45″N 76°03′57″E	Bhavani Temple More images
S-MH-242	Mahadeva temple	Mankeshwar		Dharashiv	18°21′27″N 75°38′48″E	Upload Photo
S-MH-243	Mausoleum of Hazrat Shamsuddin	Dharashiv (Osmanabad)		Dharashiv	18°10′21″N 76°02′23″E	Mausoleum of Hazrat Shamsuddin More images
S-MH-244	Tirthakunda	Ter		Dharashiv	18°19′28″N 76°08′29″E	Upload Photo

== See also ==
- List of State Protected Monuments in India for other State Protected Monuments in India
- List of Monuments of National Importance in Maharashtra
- Tourism in Maharashtra
- Tourism in Marathwada
