= Shirgaon =

Shirgaon may refer to:

- Shirgaon (Mawal), village in Pune district, Maharashtra, India
- Shirgaon, Ratnagiri, Maharashtra, India
- Shirgaon, Sangli, Maharashtra, India
- Shirgaon, Solapur, Maharashtra, India
- Shirgaon Fort, Palghar, Maharashtra, India
- Shirgaon Census Town, Palghar, Maharashtra, India

== See also ==
- Shiragaon, village in Karnataka, India
