= Shivana River =

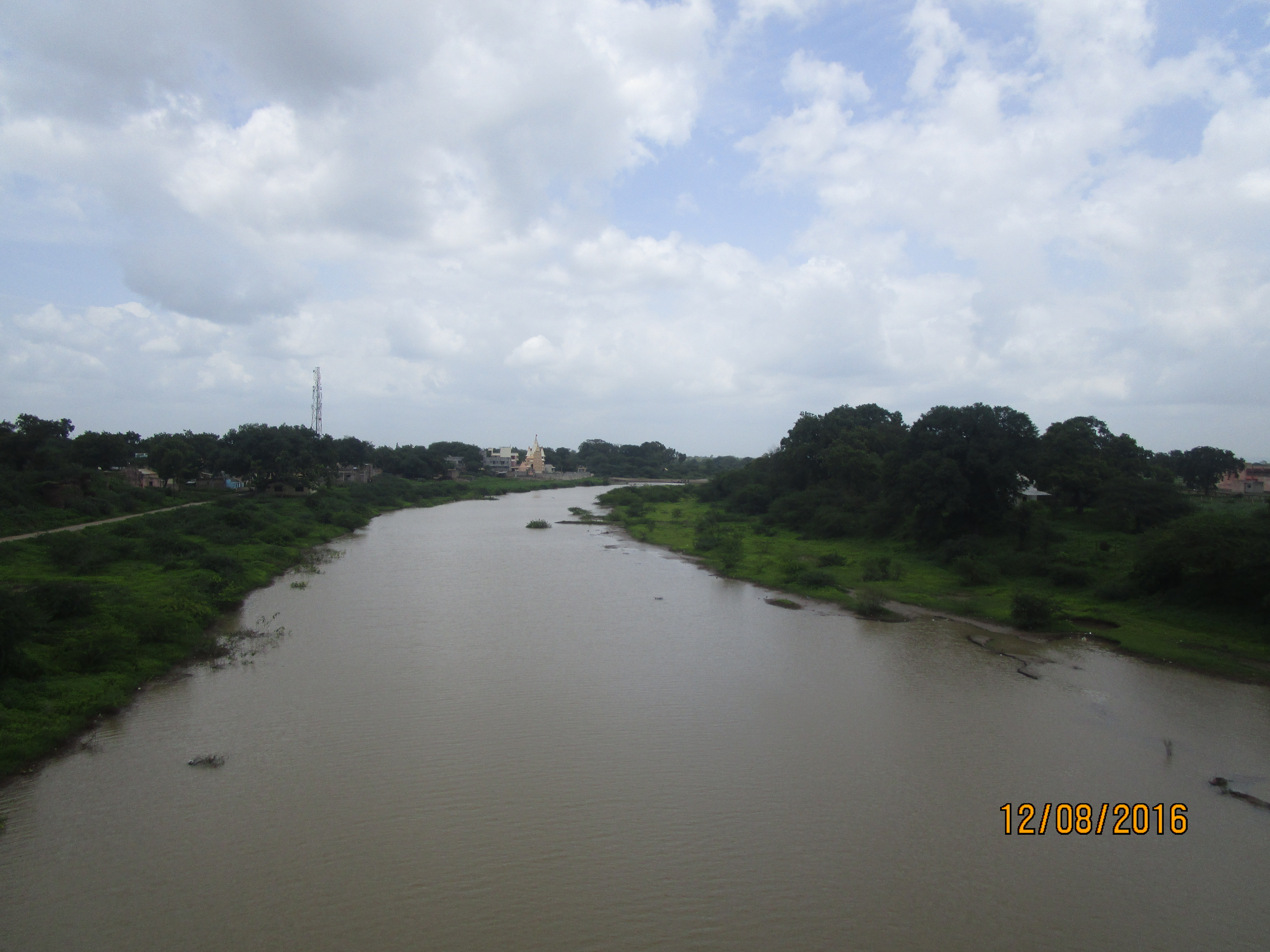
- Shivana River
- Native name: शिवना नदी (Marathi)

Location
- Country: India
- State: Maharashtra
- Region: Marathwada
- District: Shambhaji Nagar
- City: Kannad

Physical characteristics
- Source: Ajanta Range
  - location: Gautala Wildlife Sanctuary, Shambhali Nagar, Marathwada, Maharashtra, India
  - coordinates: 20°33′N 75°19′E
  - elevation: 838 m (2,749 ft)
- Mouth: Godavari River
  - location: NathSagar Reservoir, Shambhali Nagar, Marathwada, Maharashtra
  - coordinates: 19°10′N 72°02′E
  - elevation: 351 m (1,152 ft)

Shivana River is a minor but important tributary of the Godavari, lying entirely within Aurangabad district, Maharashtra. It rises in the Kannad taluka, from the south-western slope of the Ajanta Hills which also holds the origin to another major tributary Purna.

== Origin ==
The river collects streams draining the Gautala Wildlife Sanctuary from the southern slopes of the Ajanta Hills.

== Course ==
From the point of origin flows southeast for a short course till the town Kannad. Here the river is interrupted by presence of the Ambadi Dam. The reservoir thus formed provides a water resource used for human consumption and is rich in fish diversity. From Kannad, the river flows in a south-eastern direction and is impounded by another dam known as the Shivana Takli Dam. Upon reaching Jambarkheda, the river changes its course to flow south wards until Kate Pimpalgaon where it resumes the south-eastern course, ideal of most rivers of the Deccan Plateau. The river ends itself by merging seamlessly into the back waters of the NathSagar Reservoir formed by the Jayakwadi Dam on the river Godavari.It goes through Mandsaur district and touch the statue of Pashupatinath god in rainy season.

== Dams ==
- Ambadi Dam
- Shivana Takli Dam
