= Ajanta range =

Mountain range in Maharashtra, India

Ajanta Range
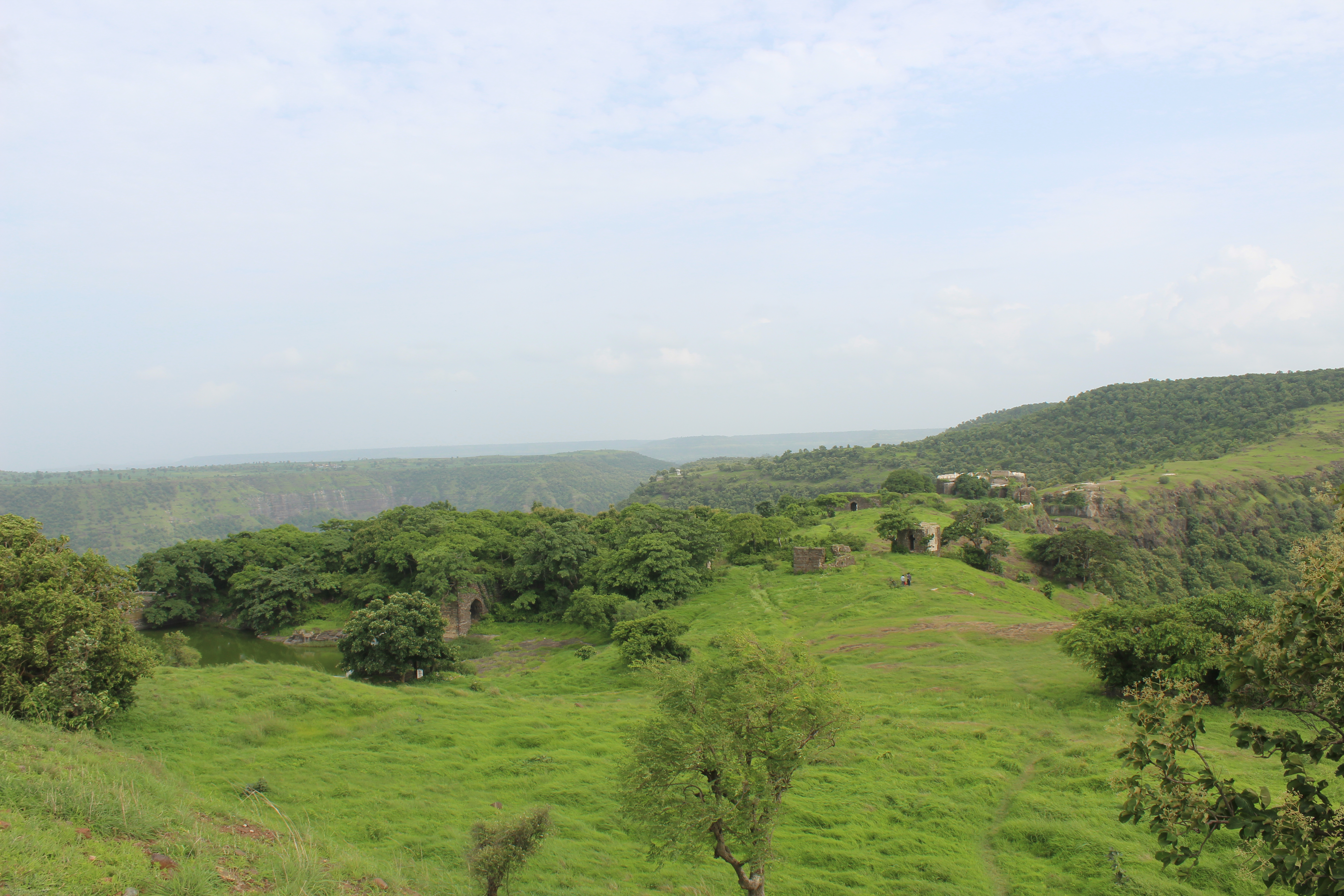
- Part of Ajanta range around Antur fort

Highest point
- Elevation: 500–700 m (1,600–2,300 ft)
- Coordinates: 20°20′N 75°10′E

Geography
- Location within Maharashtra
- Location: Ajanta Range
- Country: India
- State: Maharashtra
- District(s): Jalgaon, Aurangabad, Jalna, Buldhana

The Ajanta range (Marathi: अजिंठा पर्वतरांगा) is a mountain range in the state of Maharashtra in Central India. The range forms northern wall of the Deccan Plateau and acts as a watershed between tributaries of the Godavari and Tapi rivers.

== Geography ==
Starting from around the east of Nandgaon in Nashik district, the range follows a generally westward course towards the southern parts of Jalgaon district, the north part of Aurangabad district and Jalna district and the south of Buldhana district. The range peaks around 500–700 metres and acts as a dividing ridge between the Godavari and Tapi-Purna river basins. The rivers Dnyanganga, Vishwaganga, and Nalganga begin from the northern slopes of the range and form tributaries of the Tapi-Purna river system. The rivers Khadakpurna and Painganga originate from the southern slope and form part of the Godavari basin.

== Wildlife ==
The hills consist largely of basaltic lava trap soil and are covered with tropical dry deciduous forest. The Gautala Autramghat Sanctuary is a wildlife sanctuary in the western part and the Dnyanganga Wildlife Sanctuary is in the eastern part of the range. Leopards, sloth bears, jackals, deer, etc. are found in protected areas of the sanctuaries. The forests were home to a significant number of tigers until the 19th century; however, the tiger population significantly decreased and tigers are now a rarity in the ranges.

== History ==
The range is the site of and gives its name to the Ajanta Caves, a UNESCO World Heritage Site. Daulatabad fort and Antur fort, both protected historical sites, are located in the Ajanta hills.
