= Ambadi Dam =

- Location within Maharashtra
- Official name: Ambadi Dam
- Location: Kannad
- Coordinates: 20.2847809°N 75.0855231°E
- Opening date: 1978
- Owners: Government of Maharashtra, India

Dam and spillways
- Type of dam: Earthfill
- Impounds: Shivana River
- Height: 20 m (66 ft)
- Length: 2,210 m (7,250 ft)
- Dam volume: 707,000 m^{3} (25,000,000 cu ft)

Reservoir
- Total capacity: 942,000 m^{3} (33,300,000 cu ft)
- Surface area: 0 km^{2} (0 sq mi)

Ambadi Dam, is an earthfill dam on Sivana river near Kannad, Aurangabad district in state of Maharashtra in India.

== Specifications ==
The height of the dam above lowest foundation is 20 m (66 ft) while the length is 2,210 m (7,250 ft). The volume content is 707,000 m^{3} (25,000,000 cu ft) and gross storage capacity is 1,200,000 m^{3} (42,000,000 cu ft).

== Purpose ==
- Irrigation

== See also ==
- Dams in Maharashtra
- List of reservoirs and dams in India
