= Sanjana Jadhav =

Indian politician

Member of the Maharashtra Legislative Assembly
- Incumbent
- Assumed office November 2024
- Preceded by: Udaysingh Rajput
- Constituency: Kannad

Personal details
- Party: Shiv Sena
- Spouse: Harshvardhan Jadhav
- Parent: Raosaheb Danve (father)
- Relatives: Santosh Danve (brother)

Sanjanatai Harshvardhan Jadhav also known as Sanjanatai (born 1983) is an Indian politician from Maharashtra. She was elected to the Maharashtra Legislative Assembly from Kannad representing the Shiv Sena winning the 2024 Maharashtra Legislative Assembly election.

== Early life and education ==
Sanjana is from Kannad, Chhatrapati Sambhajinagar District, Maharashtra. She is the daughter of former union minister Raosaheb Danve and wife of two time MLA Harshvardhan Raibhan Jadhav. She completed her bachelor of arts in 2005 at Dr. Babasaheb Ambedkar Marathwada University, Aurangabad.

== Career ==
Jadhav won from Kannad Assembly constituency representing Shiv Sena, and backed by ruling Mahayuti alliance, in the 2024 Maharashtra Legislative Assembly election. She polled 84,492 votes and defeated her nearest rival, husband and ex MLA, Harshvardhan Raibhan Jadhav an independent politician, by a margin of 18,201 votes.
