= Purna River (tributary of Godavari) =

Purna river
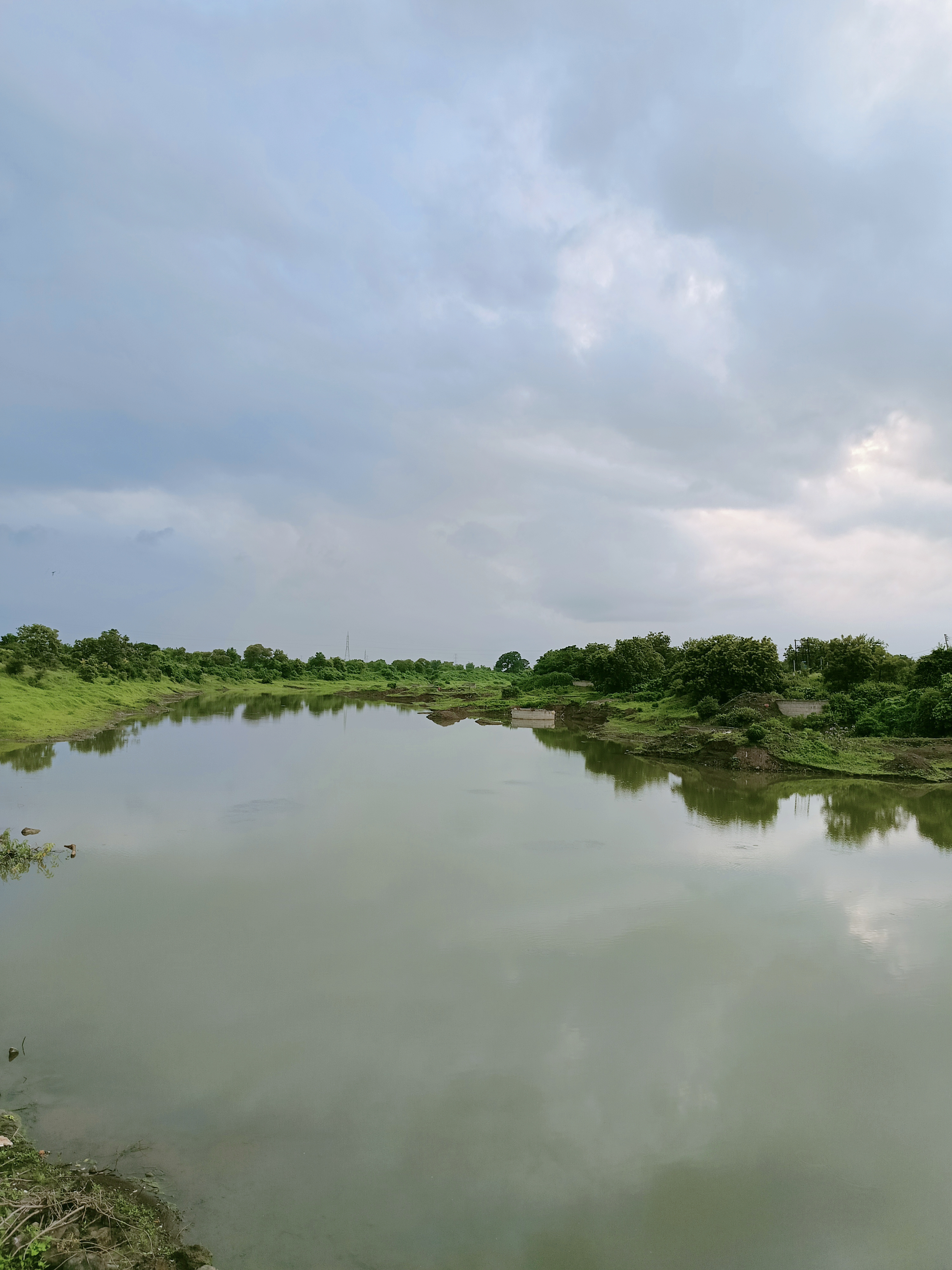
- Purna river at Kedarkheda
- Native name: पूर्णा नदी (Marathi)

Location
- Country: India
- State: Maharashtra
- Region: Marathwada
- District: Aurangabad, Jalna, Buldhana, Parbhani, Hingoli
- City: Purna

Physical characteristics
- Source: Ajanta Range
  - location: Gautala Wildlife Sanctuary, Aurangabad, Marathwada, Maharashtra, India
  - coordinates: 20°33′N 75°19′E
  - elevation: 838 m (2,749 ft)
- Mouth: Godavari River
  - location: Jambulbet, Parbhani district, Marathwada, Maharashtra
  - coordinates: 19°10′N 72°02′E
  - elevation: 351 m (1,152 ft)
- Length: 373 km (232 mi)
- Basin size: 15,579 km^{2} (6,015 sq mi)

Basin features
- Tributaries
  - left: Kelana River, Damna River, Lendi River
  - right: Anjana River, Girija River, Dudhana River

The Purna River is a major left-bank tributary of Godavari River originating in the Ajanta range in Aurangabad District, Maharashtra.The river lies in the rain shadow region of Maharashtra, on the Deccan Plateau, flowing through the districts of Aurangabad, Jalna, Buldhana, Hingoli and Parbhani with a large catchment area measuring about 15,579 km^{2}. This enormous catchment area is often tagged as a sub-basin of Godavari River and along with its tributaries forms a dendritic drainage pattern. It is a prime river in the Marathwada region of Maharashtra running for about 373 km before it converges with Godavari River south of Purna city in the Parbhani district.

== Origin ==
The river originates in the Ajanta Hill range within the Gautala Wildlife Sanctuary at an elevation of 838m. The sanctuary provides the much needed forest cover acting like a sponge to soak in the 711 mm to 889 mm of rain received per year, a crucial source of water, in this rain scarce region of Maharashtra.

== Course ==
The river has an extensive course measuring up to 373 km in length making it longer than the River Thames of Great Britain. Very close to its origin, it is dammed through the Nevpur Medium Irrigation Project within the Kannad Taluka, Aurangabad district. Collecting the tributary Anjana within the Sillod taluka, it ends its short course within Aurangabad and enters the Jalna where it is consecutively joined by two rivers, Girija at Walsakhalsa and Kelana at Jafrabad. Beyond this the river enters the Buldhana district where it spreads out into the backwaters of the Khadakpurna dam and also receives another small tributary called Damna. Then on the river assumes the role of a natural boundary between the two districts of Hingoli and Parbhani. Along the course here its flow is interrupted by two dams; Yeldari Dam - the second largest in Marathwada - which forms a large reservoir with live capacity of 0.81 billion cubic meters and Siddheshwar Dam. The flow, now considerably reduced due to the presence of the two dams, trickles along down south, leaving the boundary between Hingoli and Parbhani and flowing down into Parbhani. Just before SH 222 crosses the river, it is joined by its largest tributary - Dudhana River, thereby augmenting its flow. In its last lap the river flows through Purna city where it is damned for the last time and ultimately flows into the Godavari River at an elevation of about 351m.

== Tributaries ==
The longest tributary of Purna is Dudhana river. The list of the most significant tributaries is provided below, from the river that form a confluence nearest to the origin to the one furthest away.

Order	Left Bank	Taluka, District	Right Bank
1	----	Sillod, Aurangabad	Anjana
2	----	Bhokardan, Jalna	Girija
3	Kelana	Jafrabad, Jalna	----
4	Damna	Jafrabad, Jalna	----
5	Lendi	Jafrabad, Jalna	----
6	Aamna	Purna, Buldhana	----
7	----	Purna, Parbhani	Dudhana

== Dams ==
The river has a number of significant dams built along its course in order to harness the water in this drought prone region. The second largest dam in Marathwada is the Yeldari Dam, an earth fill type of structure nearly 51 m high with gross storage capacity of 0.934 billion cubic meters. Khadakpurna and Siddheshwar are other dams located on the river. The region relies heavily on these reservoirs to meet the water requirements with delay or poor monsoon dramatically affecting the region resulting in droughts and abysmal agricultural productivity.
