= Kannad Assembly constituency =

Constituency of the Maharashtra legislative assembly in India

Coordinates: 20.27°N 75.13°E

Kannad
- Constituency No. 105 for the Maharashtra Legislative Assembly

Constituency details
- Country: India
- Region: Western India
- State: Maharashtra
- Division: Aurangabad
- District: Aurangabad
- Lok Sabha constituency: Aurangabad
- Established: 1952
- Total electors: 333,280

Member of Legislative Assembly
- 15th Maharashtra Legislative Assembly
- Incumbent Sanjana Jadhav
- Party: SHS
- Alliance: NDA
- Elected year: 2024

Kannad Assembly constituency is one of the six constituencies of Maharashtra Vidhan Sabha located in the Aurangabad district.

It is a part of the Aurangabad (Lok Sabha constituency) along with five other assembly constituencies, viz Vaijapur Assembly constituency, Gangapur Assembly constituency, Aurangabad East Assembly constituency, Aurangabad Central Assembly constituency and Aurangabad West Assembly constituency.

== Members of the Legislative Assembly ==
Year	Member	Party
1952	Ramgopal Ramakishan Nawadar	Indian National Congress
1957	Baburao Manikrao Nawadar	Indian National Congress
1962	Kakasaheb Bhikanrao Deshmukh	Indian National Congress
1967	Narayan Patil	Indian National Congress
1972	Narayan Patil	Indian National Congress
1978	T. S. Patil	Janata Party
1980	Raibhan Jadhav	Indian National Congress (U)
1985	Kishore Patil	Indian Congress (Socialist)
1990	Raibhan Jadhav	Independent
1995	Raibhan Jadhav	Indian National Congress
1999	Nitin Suresh Patil	Indian National Congress
2004	Namdev Pawar	Shiv Sena
2009	Harshvardhan Jadhav	Maharashtra Navnirman Sena
2014	Harshvardhan Jadhav	Shiv Sena
2019	Udaysingh Rajput	Shiv Sena
2024	Sanjana Jadhav	Shiv Sena

== Election results ==
=== Assembly Election 2024 ===
2024 Maharashtra Legislative Assembly election : Kannad
Party	Candidate	Votes	%	±%
SS	Sanjanatai Harshvardhan Jadhav	84,492	36.54%	▼0.55
PWPI	Harshvardhan Jadhav	66,291	28.67%	New
SS(UBT)	Udaysingh Rajput	46,510	20.12%	New
Independent	Manoj Keshavrao Pawar	11,735	5.08%	New
VBA	Ayas Makbul Shah	8,539	3.69%	▼3.03
MNS	Chavhan Lakhan Rohidas	3,595	1.55%	New
Independent	Abdul Javed Abdul Wahed	3,208	1.39%	New
Independent	Sangita Ganesh Jadhav	1,764	0.76%	New
NOTA	None of the above	1,093	0.47%	▼0.54
Margin of victory		18,201	7.87%	▼0.88
Turnout		232,302	69.70%	▲1.14
Total valid votes		231,209		
Registered electors		333,280		▲5.91
SS hold		Swing	▼0.55	

=== Assembly Election 2019 ===
2019 Maharashtra Legislative Assembly election : Kannad
Party	Candidate	Votes	%	±%
SS	Udaysingh Rajput	79,225	37.09%	▲4.12
Independent	Harshvardhan Jadhav	60,535	28.34%	New
NCP	Kolhe Santosh Kisan	43,625	20.43%	▼11.72
VBA	Maruti Gulab Rathod	14,349	6.72%	New
Independent	Kishor (Aaba) Narayanrao Pawar	10,614	4.97%	New
Independent	Vitthalrao Narayan Thorat	3,247	1.52%	New
NOTA	None of the above	2,167	1.01%	▼0.09
Margin of victory		18,690	8.75%	▲7.93
Turnout		215,758	68.56%	▲0.38
Total valid votes		213,583		
Registered electors		314,679		▲11.82
SS hold		Swing	▲4.12	

=== Assembly Election 2014 ===
2014 Maharashtra Legislative Assembly election : Kannad
Party	Candidate	Votes	%	±%
SS	Harshvardhan Jadhav	62,542	32.97%	▲19.74
NCP	Udaysingh Rajput	60,981	32.15%	New
BJP	Dr. Sanjay Gavhane	28,037	14.78%	New
INC	Namdev Ramrao Pawar	21,865	11.53%	▼2.84
RSPS	Rathod Maruti Gulabrao	5,732	3.02%	New
MNS	Subhash Patil	3,602	1.90%	▼25.08
BSP	Rathod Keshav Mansing	3,522	1.86%	New
NOTA	None of the above	2,094	1.10%	New
Margin of victory		1,561	0.82%	▼1.58
Turnout		191,865	68.18%	▲1.72
Total valid votes		189,687		
Registered electors		281,425		▲9.43
SS gain from MNS		Swing	▲5.99	

=== Assembly Election 2009 ===
2009 Maharashtra Legislative Assembly election : Kannad
Party	Candidate	Votes	%	±%
MNS	Harshvardhan Jadhav	46,106	26.98%	New
Independent	Udaysingh Rajput	41,999	24.57%	New
INC	Bharatsingh Shivsingh Rajput	24,561	14.37%	▼6.36
SS	Namdev Ramrao Pawar	22,619	13.23%	▼7.91
Independent	Annasaheb Panditrao Shinde	19,829	11.60%	New
Independent	Gajanan Ganpatrao Surase	2,304	1.35%	New
Independent	Shaikh Yakub Mahemood	2,106	1.23%	New
Independent	Jadhav Bharat Laxman	1,954	1.14%	New
Margin of victory		4,107	2.40%	▲1.99
Turnout		170,914	66.46%	▼6.95
Total valid votes		170,911		
Registered electors		257,180		▲10.99
MNS gain from SS		Swing	▲5.84	

=== Assembly Election 2004 ===
2004 Maharashtra Legislative Assembly election : Kannad
Party	Candidate	Votes	%	±%
SS	Namdev Ramrao Pawar	35,951	21.14%	▼11.20
INC	Nitin Suresh Patil	35,251	20.73%	▼12.79
Independent	Harshvardhan Jadhav	34,278	20.16%	New
Independent	Udaysingh Rajput	33,789	19.87%	New
Independent	Uttamrao Balachand Rathod	12,821	7.54%	New
Independent	Vilas Kishanrao More	7,717	4.54%	New
BSP	Shaikh Yakub Shaikh Mehmood	4,708	2.77%	▲2.07
Independent	Chawan Yogeshwarrao Eknathrao	3,837	2.26%	New
Margin of victory		700	0.41%	▼0.77
Turnout		170,095	73.41%	▲4.94
Total valid votes		170,056		
Registered electors		231,705		▲20.40
SS gain from INC		Swing	▼12.38	

=== Assembly Election 1999 ===
1999 Maharashtra Legislative Assembly election : Kannad
Party	Candidate	Votes	%	±%
INC	Nitin Suresh Patil	41,096	33.52%	▼19.26
SS	Namdev Ramrao Pawar	39,651	32.34%	▲2.78
NCP	Jadhav Tejaswini Raibhan	39,548	32.25%	New
Independent	Vitthalrao Narayan Thorat	1,470	1.20%	New
BSP	Bhosale Haridas Bajirao	853	0.70%	New
Margin of victory		1,445	1.18%	▼22.04
Turnout		131,761	68.47%	▲21.16
Total valid votes		122,618		
Registered electors		192,440		▲2.09
INC hold		Swing	▼19.26	

=== Assembly By-election 1998 ===
1998 Maharashtra Legislative Assembly by-election : Kannad
Party	Candidate	Votes	%	±%
INC	Jadhav Tejaswini Raibhan	45,642	52.78%	▲18.14
SS	Subhash Patil	25,559	29.56%	▲12.72
SP	Uttamrao Rathod	15,037	17.39%	New
Margin of victory		20,083	23.22%	▲6.92
Turnout		89,190	47.31%	▼26.03
Total valid votes		86,472		
Registered electors		188,508		▼1.15
INC hold		Swing	▲18.14	

=== Assembly Election 1995 ===
1995 Maharashtra Legislative Assembly election : Kannad
Party	Candidate	Votes	%	±%
INC	Raibhan Rambhaji Jadhav	46,639	34.64%	▲8.38
Independent	Pawar Narayan Bajirao	24,692	18.34%	New
SS	Kolhe Kishan Budhaji	22,672	16.84%	▼0.22
BBM	Jadhav Sitaram Jesu	19,702	14.63%	New
Independent	Patil Kishor Patilba	12,393	9.20%	New
JD	Rajput Narayansingh Budhsinh	4,684	3.48%	▼8.78
Independent	Wagh Rameshrao Wamanrao	1,506	1.12%	New
Margin of victory		21,947	16.30%	▲9.75
Turnout		139,859	73.34%	▲10.97
Total valid votes		134,635		
Registered electors		190,695		▲9.26
INC gain from Independent		Swing	▲1.83	

=== Assembly Election 1990 ===
1990 Maharashtra Legislative Assembly election : Kannad
Party	Candidate	Votes	%	±%
Independent	Raibhan Rambhaji Jadhav	34,832	32.81%	New
INC	Kishor Patil	27,875	26.26%	▲1.22
SS	Yeshwant Pawar	18,110	17.06%	New
JD	Kolhe Bhagaji Budhaji	13,019	12.26%	New
Independent	Uttamrao Balachand Rathod	7,454	7.02%	New
Independent	Vithalbai Madhavrao Khairnar	1,226	1.15%	New
Independent	Kailas Manikrao Bodkhe	817	0.77%	New
Margin of victory		6,957	6.55%	▼5.71
Turnout		108,864	62.37%	▲3.16
Total valid votes		106,148		
Registered electors		174,538		▲26.79
Independent gain from IC(S)		Swing	▼4.48	

=== Assembly Election 1985 ===
1985 Maharashtra Legislative Assembly election : Kannad
Party	Candidate	Votes	%	±%
IC(S)	Kishore Patil Adhav	29,462	37.29%	New
INC	Narayan Girmaji Patil	19,778	25.04%	New
CPI	Sudam Bala Jadhav	14,093	17.84%	New
Independent	Walmik Poma Chavan	10,171	12.88%	New
Independent	Syed Daud Syed Hayat	3,404	4.31%	New
Independent	Dagdu Shravan	1,324	1.68%	New
Independent	Jape Shasikant Raghunath	766	0.97%	New
Margin of victory		9,684	12.26%	▼4.24
Turnout		81,510	59.21%	▲7.48
Total valid votes		78,998		
Registered electors		137,661		▲10.22
IC(S) gain from INC(U)		Swing	▲0.33	

=== Assembly Election 1980 ===
1980 Maharashtra Legislative Assembly election : Kannad
Party	Candidate	Votes	%	±%
INC(U)	Raibhan Rambhaji Jadhav	23,144	36.96%	New
INC(I)	Baburao Manikrao	12,813	20.46%	▲3.11
Independent	Ramrao Gangaram	7,606	12.15%	New
JP	Tukaram Shankar Patil	6,204	9.91%	New
Independent	Asaram Sakharam	4,354	6.95%	New
Independent	Vishwanath Govindrao Nimbhorkar	4,031	6.44%	New
Independent	Kanhiram Gurudayal	2,249	3.59%	New
Independent	Dagdu Shravan Divekar	1,153	1.84%	New
Margin of victory		10,331	16.50%	▲5.84
Turnout		64,603	51.73%	▼11.28
Total valid votes		62,621		
Registered electors		124,895		▲9.24
INC(U) gain from JP		Swing	▼8.49	

=== Assembly Election 1978 ===
1978 Maharashtra Legislative Assembly election : Kannad
Party	Candidate	Votes	%	±%
JP	Tukaram Shankar Patil	31,450	45.45%	New
INC	Pandurang Shenphadu	24,075	34.79%	▼20.86
INC(I)	Asaram Sakharam	12,008	17.35%	New
Independent	Bhaginath Tatyarao Bhairav	1,668	2.41%	New
Margin of victory		7,375	10.66%	▼0.63
Turnout		72,043	63.01%	▲12.76
Total valid votes		69,201		
Registered electors		114,327		▲19.35
JP gain from INC		Swing	▼10.20	

=== Assembly Election 1972 ===
1972 Maharashtra Legislative Assembly election : Kannad
Party	Candidate	Votes	%	±%
INC	Narayan Girmaji Patil	25,765	55.65%	▼10.61
SSP	Tila Sajan	20,536	44.35%	New
Margin of victory		5,229	11.29%	▼30.93
Turnout		48,136	50.25%	▲6.03
Total valid votes		46,301		
Registered electors		95,792		▲13.58
INC hold		Swing	▼10.61	

=== Assembly Election 1967 ===
1967 Maharashtra Legislative Assembly election : Kannad
Party	Candidate	Votes	%	±%
INC	Narayan Girmaji Patil	22,731	66.26%	▲12.75
Independent	K. Gurudayal	8,245	24.03%	New
Independent	R. Mhasu	3,331	9.71%	New
Margin of victory		14,486	42.22%	▲5.70
Turnout		37,299	44.22%	▼8.80
Total valid votes		34,307		
Registered electors		84,341		▲1.02
INC hold		Swing	▲12.75	

=== Assembly Election 1962 ===
1962 Maharashtra Legislative Assembly election : Kannad
Party	Candidate	Votes	%	±%
INC	Kakasaheb Bhikanrao Deshmukh	21,926	53.51%	▲10.03
PSP	Kanhiram Gurudayal	6,959	16.98%	▼17.18
Independent	Girjaram Bapurao	6,259	15.27%	New
Independent	Mishrilal Jawahirmal	5,834	14.24%	New
Margin of victory		14,967	36.52%	▲27.20
Turnout		44,270	53.02%	▲13.69
Total valid votes		40,978		
Registered electors		83,489		▲23.39
INC hold		Swing	▲10.03	

=== Assembly Election 1957 ===
1957 Bombay State Legislative Assembly election : Kannad
Party	Candidate	Votes	%	±%
INC	Baburao Manikrao	11,569	43.48%	▼7.14
PSP	Kakasaheb Bhikanrao Deshmukh	9,089	34.16%	New
Independent	Patil Shaikhlal	3,202	12.03%	New
Independent	Patil Eknath Deoram	2,750	10.33%	New
Margin of victory		2,480	9.32%	▲8.07
Turnout		26,610	39.33%	▼6.73
Total valid votes		26,610		
Registered electors		67,665		▲24.92
INC hold		Swing	▼7.14	

=== Assembly Election 1952 ===
1952 Hyderabad State Legislative Assembly election : Kannad
Party	Candidate	Votes	%	±%
INC	Nawadar, Ramgopal Ramakishan	12,630	50.62%	New
Socialist	Kakasaheb Alias Tajpal	12,319	49.38%	New
Margin of victory		311	1.25%	
Turnout		24,949	46.06%	
Total valid votes		24,949		
Registered electors		54,167		
INC win (new seat)				

== See also ==
- Vaijapur
