= Shivana Takli Dam =

- Location within Maharashtra
- Official name: Shivana Takli Dam D03058
- Location: Kannad
- Coordinates: 20.1166709°N 75.0836616°E
- Opening date: 2005
- Owners: Government of Maharashtra, India

Dam and spillways
- Type of dam: Earthfill
- Impounds: Shivana River
- Height: 17.7 m (58 ft)
- Length: 4,524 m (14,843 ft)
- Dam volume: 622 km^{3} (149 cu mi)

Reservoir
- Total capacity: 38,190 km^{3} (9,160 cu mi)
- Surface area: 887 km^{2} (342 sq mi)

Shivana Takli Dam, is an earthfill dam on Shivna river near Kannad, Aurangabad district in the state of Maharashtra in India.

== Specifications ==
The height of the dam above lowest foundation is 17.7 m (58 ft) while the length is 4,524 m (14,843 ft). The volume content is 622 km^{3} (149 cu mi) and gross storage capacity is 39,360.00 km^{3} (9,442.97 cu mi).

== Purpose ==
- Irrigation

== See also ==
- Dams in Maharashtra
- List of reservoirs and dams in India
