= Harshvardhan Jadhav =

Indian politician from Maharashtra

Member of Maharashtra Legislative Assembly
- In office (2009-2014), (2014 – 2019)
- Preceded by: Namdev Pawar
- Succeeded by: Udaysingh Rajput
- Constituency: Kannad

Personal details
- Born: 1978 (age 47–48)
- Party: Bharat Rashtra Samithi
- Other political affiliations: Maharashtra Navnirman Sena; Shiv Sena; Shiv Swarajya Paksha
- Spouse: Sanjana Jadhav
- Children: 1
- Relatives: Raosaheb Danve Patil (Father-In-Law); Santosh Raosaheb Danve Patil (Brother-In-Law)
- Education: Diploma in Business Administration at Cardiff University
- Occupation: Farming and Business

Harshvardhan Jadhav is an Indian politician who formerly represented Kannad in the Maharashtra Legislative Assembly. He has been a member of Shiv Sena, Maharashtra Navnirman Sena, Shiv Swarajya Paksha at various times in his political career and later joined the Bharat Rashtra Samithi (BRS).

== Political career ==
Coming from a political family, Jadhav entered politics somewhat reluctantly in 2004, losing the Assembly election that year as an independent. He was elected to Vidhan Sabha in 2009 from the Kannad Assembly Constituency as a Maharashtra Navnirman Sena nominee. He won the seat for a consecutive term in 2014, as a member of Shiv Sena.

Jadhav contested the 2019 Lok Sabha election as an independent from Aurangabad. Jadhav gained sizeable Maratha support, which resulted in the Shiv Sena losing the seat after having won it for 4 consecutive elections. In the aftermath, his house was pelted with stones by Shiv Sena supporters for his comments about Uddhav Thackeray. While he had floated his own party "Shiv Swarajya Paksha/Shiv Swarajya Bahujan Paksh", he contested as an Independent. He later announced that the party will continue fielding candidates in upcoming state elections.

Jadhav rejoined MNS in 2020 and was tasked with playing an influential role in Marathwada politics.

He is known for his activism for Maratha reservation and support for Maratha Kranti Morcha.

In May 2020, Jadhav announced that he has retired from politics and would support his wife to further her political ambitions.

== Controversies ==
In 2011, Jadhav was involved in an assault case where he claimed he was assaulted by the police. A counter-case was filed by the police alleging he was the one who instigated the attacks. Two cops were suspended after the incident and in 2017 Jadhav was sentenced to one year in jail. In 2014, He was again in the news for slapping a security officer.

In March 2020, a case was registered against Jadhav for verbally assaulting a person from the Scheduled caste under the Atrocities act. His camp denied the allegations and called the charges politically motivated.

In Dec 2020, the Bopodi Police station lodged an FIR against him for attempted murder in a road rage incident in Aundh, Pune in which he was later granted bail and the opposing side were charged under the same.

== Personal life ==
Jadhav is the son of Late Raibhan Jadhav, a politician from Indian national congress and social worker who was locally known as Krishi Maharshi for his agricultural work in the Kannad constituency.

After series of video posts over previous months, Jadhav filed for divorce in August 2020 citing mental anguish.

== Positions held ==
- 2009: Elected to Maharashtra Legislative Assembly as member of Maharashtra Navnirman Sena
- 2014: Re-elected to Maharashtra Legislative Assembly, as member of Shiv Sena
