= Yeldari Dam =

- Location within India
- Official name: Yeldari Dam D03211
- Location: Yeldari
- Coordinates: 19.7196664°N 76.7319488°E
- Opening date: 1968
- Owners: Government of Maharashtra, India

Dam and spillways
- Type of dam: Earthfill
- Impounds: Purna river
- Height: 51.2 m (168 ft)
- Length: 4,232 m (13,885 ft)

Reservoir
- Creates: Yeldari
- Total capacity: 0.934 km^{3} (0.224 cu mi)
- Surface area: 101.540 km^{2} (39.205 sq mi)

Yeldari Dam is an earthfill dam on Purna river near Yeldari in Jintur taluka of Parbhani district in the state of Maharashtra in India. It is the second largest dam in Marathwada region. Dam is renovated and developed as a big reservoir and also tourist attraction spot in Parbhani district.

== Specifications ==
The height of the dam above its lowest foundation is 51.2 m (168 ft) while the length is 4,232 m (13,885 ft). The live storage capacity is 0.81 km^{3} (0.19 cu mi).

== Purpose ==
- Irrigation
- Hydroelectricity

The dam was built between 1958 and 1968 under the observation of Yashwantrao Chavan. It has a hydroelectric power station consisting of three units of 7.5 MW capacity each for 22.5 MW total capacity.

== See also ==
- Dams in Maharashtra
- List of reservoirs and dams in India
