= Udaysingh Rajput =

Indian politician

- उदयसिंह राजपूत

Member of Legislative Assembly of Maharashtra
- In office October 2019 – 26 November 2024
- Preceded by: Harshvardhan Jadhav
- Succeeded by: Sanjana Jadhav
- Constituency: Kannad

Personal details
- Born: Udaysingh Sardarsingh Rajput; 1 July 1971 (age 55) Nagad, Aurangabad district
- Party: Shiv Sena(UBT)
- Other political affiliations: Shiv Sena
- Education: Graduate BA From Yashwantrao Chavan Open University Nashik,
- Occupation: Politician, Agriculture, Social worker

Udaysingh Rajput (Marathi: उदयसिंह राजपूत) is a Shiv Sena (UBT) politician from Aurangabad district, Maharashtra. He has previously served as the Member of Legislative Assembly from Kannad Vidhan Sabha constituency as a member of Shiv Sena from 2019 to 2022 and as a member of Shiv Sena (UBT) from 2022 to 2024. Rajput serves as a social worker as well.

== Positions held ==
- 2019: Elected to Maharashtra Legislative Assembly
