= Antur Fort =

Fort in Maharashtra, India

- Kannad, Auranagabad district, Maharashtra
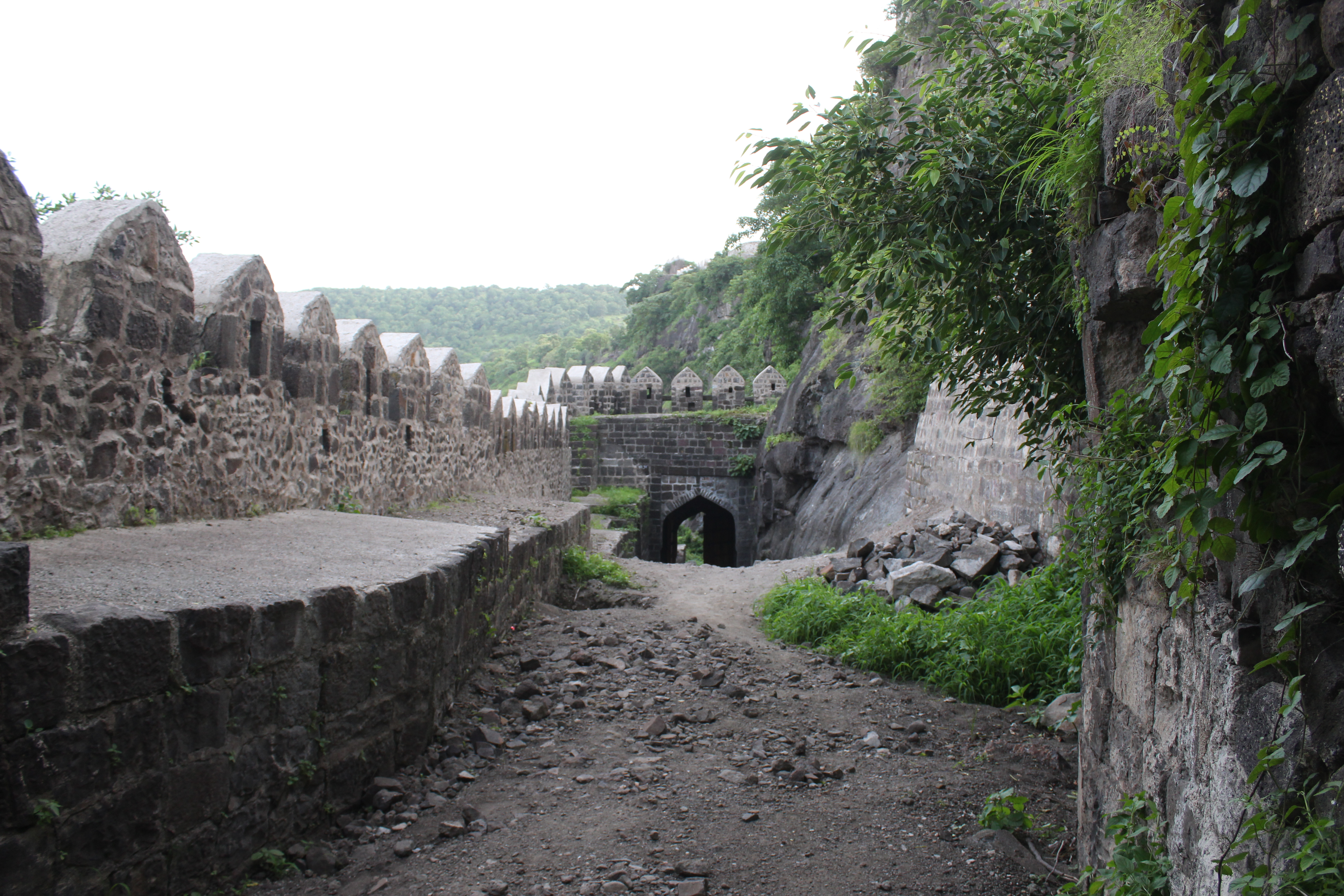

Site information
- Owner: Government of India
- Open to the public: Yes

Location
- Antur Fort in Maharashtra
- Coordinates: 20.427345°N 75.236017°E

Antur Fort is a fort near Nagapur village in Kannad taluka In Chhatrapati Sambhajinagar district of Maharashtra state of India. This monument is protected by Maharashtra State, Archaeology Department.

== History ==
The fort was built about the middle of the 15th century by a Maratha Chief and was named after him. It was taken by the Mohammedans. Between 16th and 17th centuries it belonged to the Nizam Shahi of Ahmadnagar, as is evidenced front several inscriptions in the fort in which some of the kings of this dynasty are mentioned.

== Structure ==
The hill on which fort stays is nearly square in form and about a mile in circumference. It has a natural scarp about 700 ft high on three sides while on the south it has been artificially scarped. Two fines of walls, with bastions at intervals, extend round the brow of the hill at a short distance from each other and the entrance was guarded by strong teak wood gates.

== See also ==
- List of State Protected Monuments in Maharashtra
