= Panhale Kazi =

Village in Maharashtra

Coordinates: 17°38′28″N 73°15′1″E

- Village
- Interactive map of Panhale Kazi
- Country: India
- State: Maharashtra

Panhale Kazi is a small village in Ratnagiri district, Maharashtra state in Western India. The 2011 Census of India recorded a total of 510 residents in the village. Panhale Kazi's geographical area is approximately 562 hectares (1,390 acres).
