= Bharatgad =

Fort near Malvan, India

Bharatgad Fort
- Part of Konkan coast Range
- Sindhudurg district, Maharashtra

Site information
- Type: Sea fort
- Owner: Private
- Controlled by: Maratha Empire (1739-1818); United Kingdom: East India Company (1818-1857); British Raj (1857-1947); India (1947-)
- Open to the public: Yes
- Condition: Good

Location
- Shown within Maharashtra Bharatgad Fort (India)
- Coordinates: 16°10′15.7″N 73°29′55.2″E
- Height: 225 Ft.

Site history
- Materials: Red laterite Stone

Bharatgad Fort is a fort located 18 km from Malvan, in Sindhudurg district, of Maharashtra. This fort is located on the southern bank of Gad river or Kalaval creek. The fort is spread over an area of 4-5 acres and covered with mango orchard.

== History ==
Shivaji Maharaj visited this place in 1670 but due to less availability of water on the Masure hill, he abandoned the site for building the fort. In 1680 the Wadikar Phonda Sawant decided to build the fort. The fort was completed in 1701. In 1748 Tulaji Angre, the son of Kanhoji Angre tried to captured the fort. In 1818, Captain Hutchinson captured this fort and found that the well on the fort was devoid of water.

== How to reach ==
The nearest town is Malvan which is 526 km from Mumbai. The base village of the fort is Masure. The Bharatgad and Bhadwantgad forts can be visited in a single day. There are good hotels at Malvan, now tea and snacks are also available in small hotels on the way to Masure.

== Places to see ==
The gates and bastion are in good state. This fort is a private property. This fort has 9 bastions. the entire fort is protected by 20feet wide and 10feet deep moat. The balekilla is in the center of the fort. It is protected by a 10feet high wall and four strong bastions. There is a well, a gunpowder storeroom, grain store room and a Mahapurush temple inside the balekilla. There is also a cave and hidden door inside the fort. It takes about an hour to visit all places on the fort.

== See also ==
- List of forts in India
- Maratha Navy
- Maratha War of Independence
- Battles involving the Maratha Empire
- Maratha Army
- Military history of India
- List of Maratha dynasties and states
