= Riwa Fort =

Coastal fort in Mumbai, India

- Kala Qilla
- Dharavi, Mumbai, India
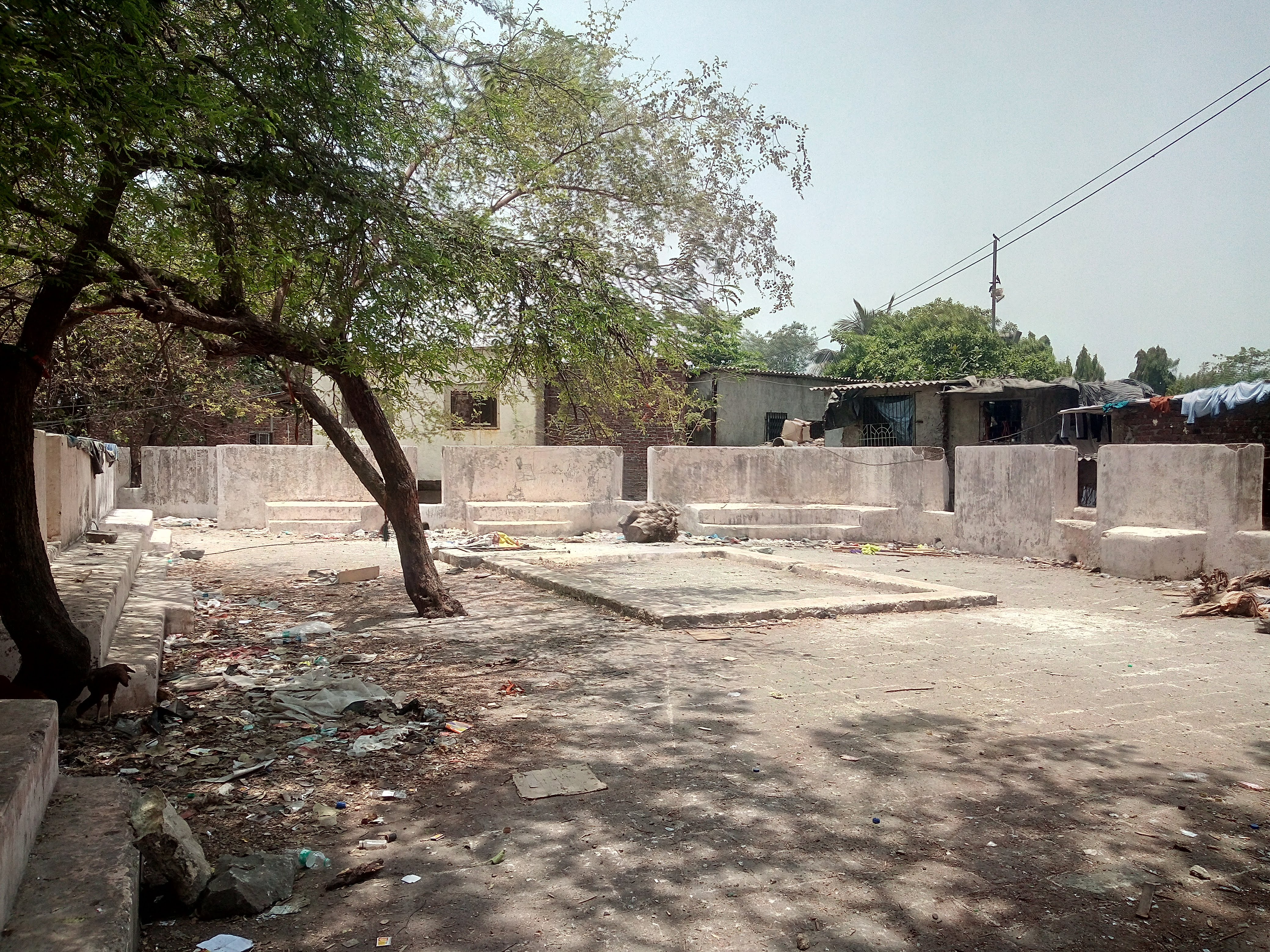
- Remnants of the Riwa Fort

Site information
- Type: Land battery
- Owner: East India Company; Maratha Kingdom; Government of India (1947- Present)
- Open to the public: No
- Condition: Dilapidated

Location
- Coordinates: 19.0509°N 72.86006°E

Site history
- Built: 1737; 289 years ago
- Built by: John Horne
- Materials: Basalt and Lime mortar

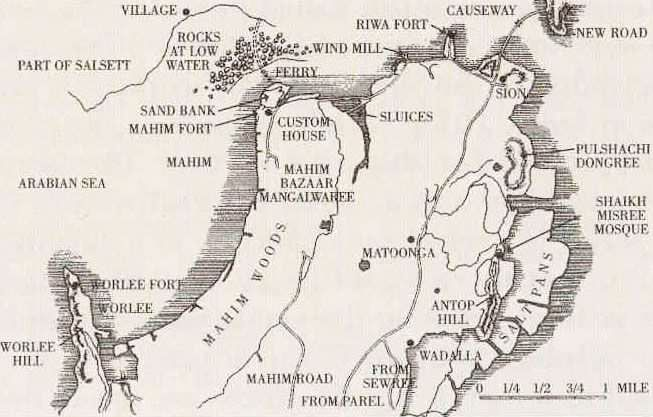
Old map of the region (post 1805). Riwa Fort is shown to the north.

The Riwa Fort (also Fort), locally known as Kala Qilla or Black Fort, is a fort in central Mumbai (Bombay), India on the banks of the Mithi River. The fort is currently in a dilapidated condition amidst the Dharavi slums. Dharavi was initially a large piece of marshy land that was located strategically, dividing the lands ruled by the British and the Portuguese. John Horne, the then Governor of Bombay, had commissioned the construction of this fort to protect Bombay from the aggressive sea-faring Maratha leader Kanhoji Angre. The Riwa Fort was later captured by the Marathas.

The fort falls under the jurisdiction of the Maharashtra Directorate of Archaeology and Museums.

== See also ==
- List of forts in Maharashtra
