= Ghatotkacha Caves =

Buddhist caves in Maharashtra, India

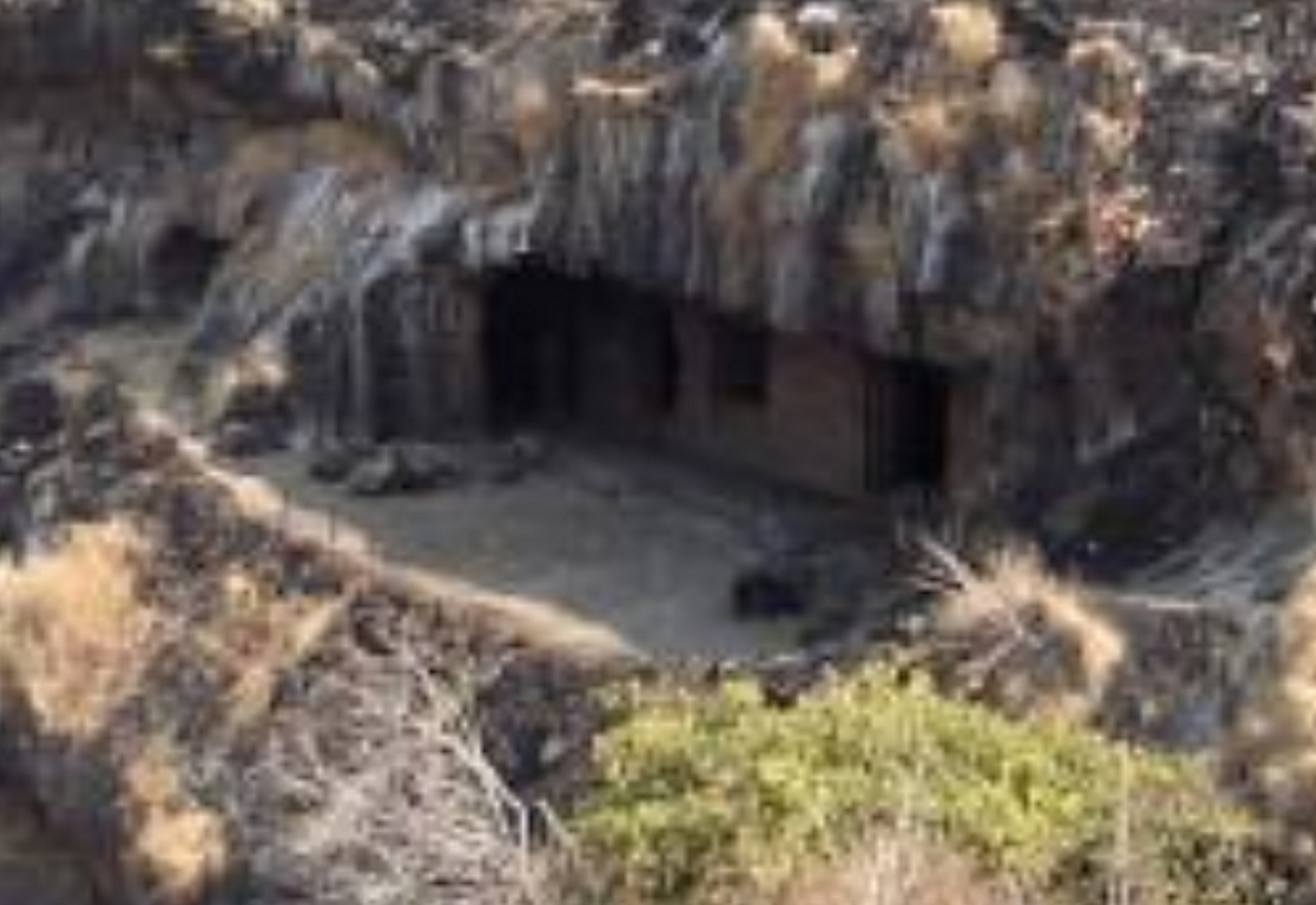
- Ghatotkacha Cave

- Location within India
- 20.552620°N 75.584977°E

Site notes
- Governing body: Archeological Survey of India

The Ghatotkach Caves are located 18 km to the west of Ajantha, near Jinjala, India. The caves include three Buddhist caves, one is a chaitya and two are viharas. The caves were excavated in the 6th century AD, and were influenced by Mahayana Buddhism.

The caves have an inscription by Varahadeva, a minister of the Vakataka dynasty under King Harishena (r. c. 475 – c. 500 CE). Varahadeva is also known for a decatory inscription in Cave 16 at Ajanta Caves in which he affirms his devotion to the Buddhist faith: "regarding the sacred law as his only companion, (he was) extremely devoted to the Buddha, the teacher of the world".

The inscription at Ghatotkacha Cave is about the Buddha, the Dhamma and the Sangha. At the same time, Varahadeva proudly affirms his Hindu heritage. The inscription gives a long genealogy of the donor's family. It includes mention of a person named Soma, who had Kshatriya as well as Brahmana wives.

The Maharashtra Tourism Development Corporation advises that the caves are only for the adventurous traveller as access is difficult.

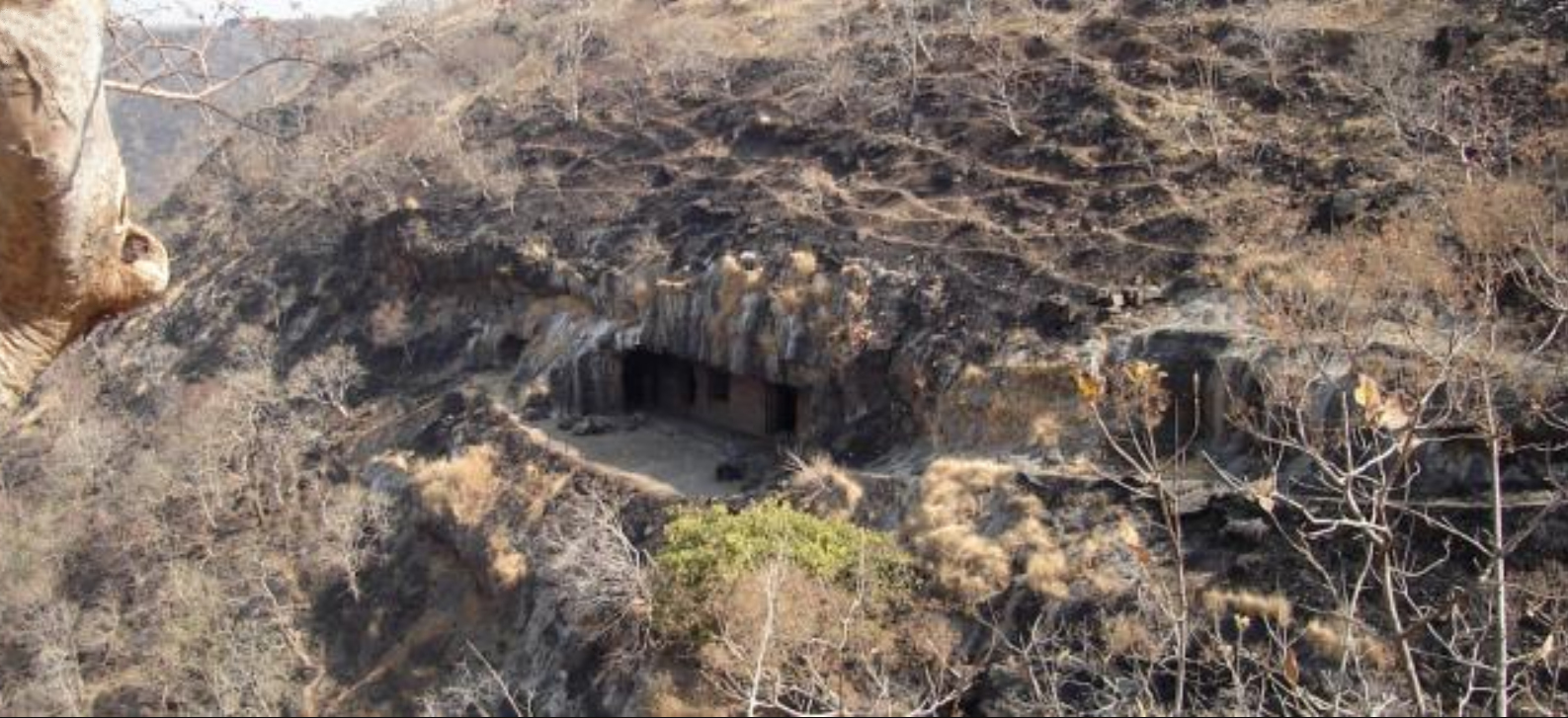
The Ghatotkacha Caves and their environment.

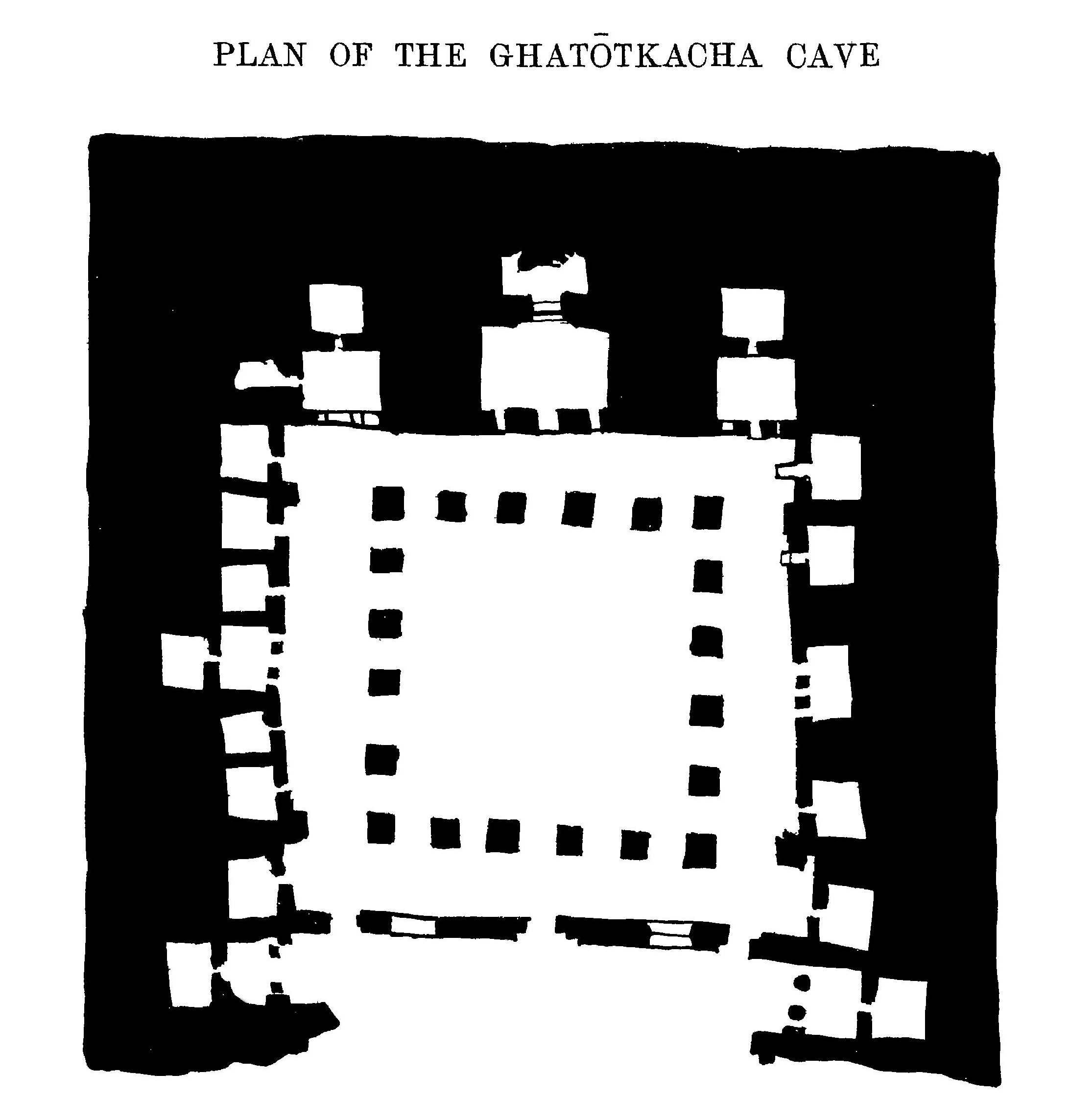
Plan of the main Ghatotkacha cave

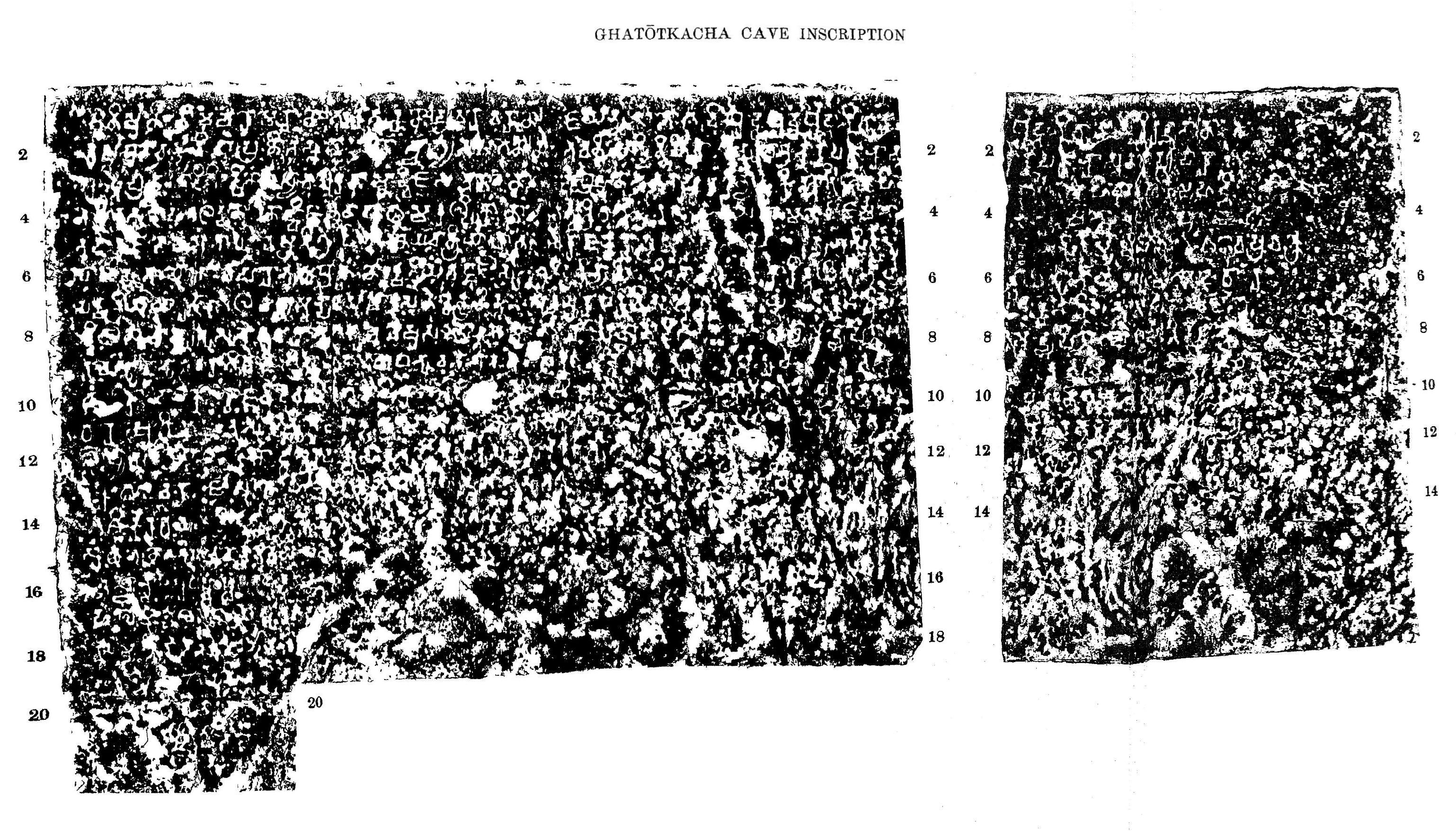
Ghatotkacha cave inscription

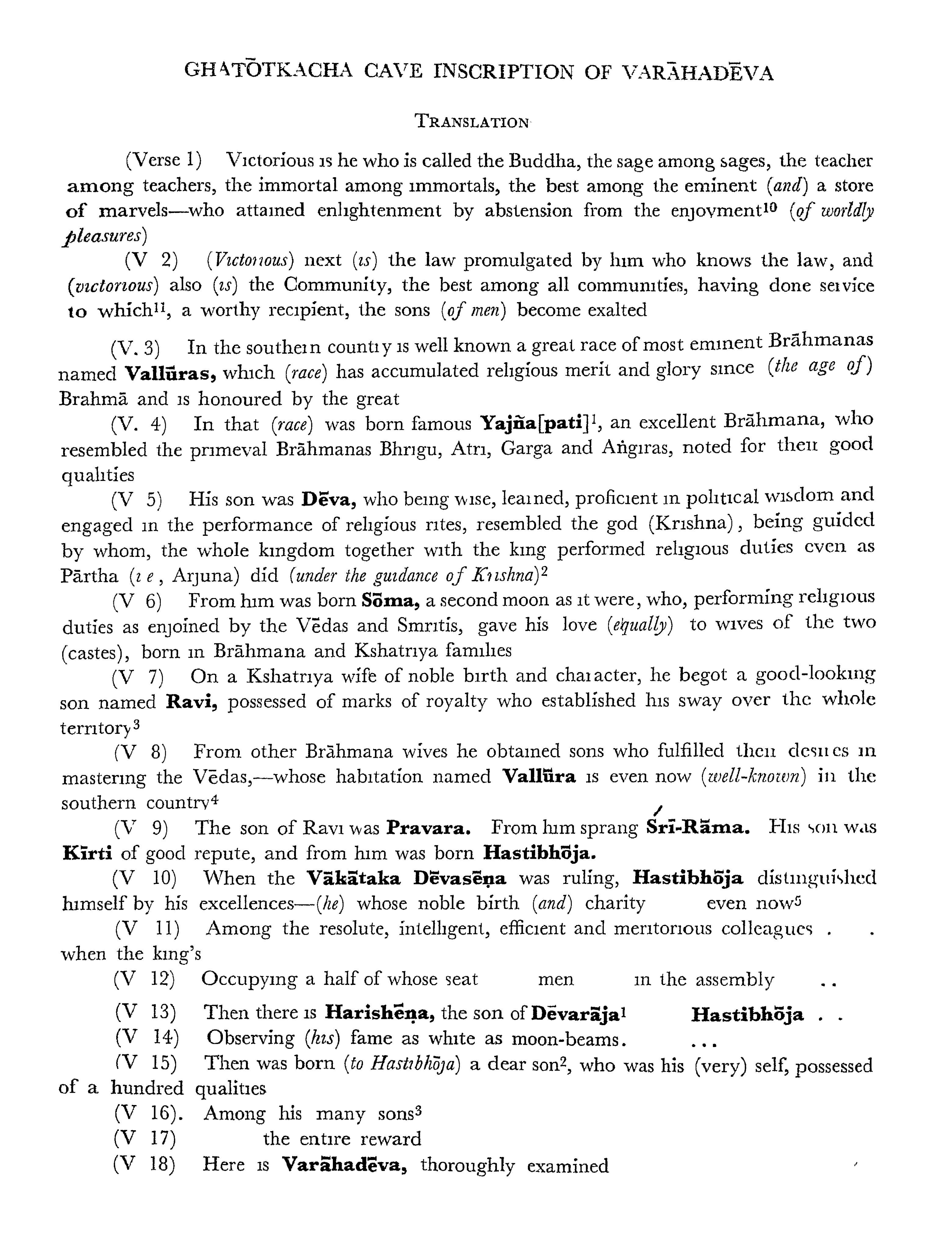
Ghatotkacha inscription (translation)
