= Shirgaon Fort =

- शिरगाव किल्ला
- Part of Konkan coast
- Palghar district, Maharashtra
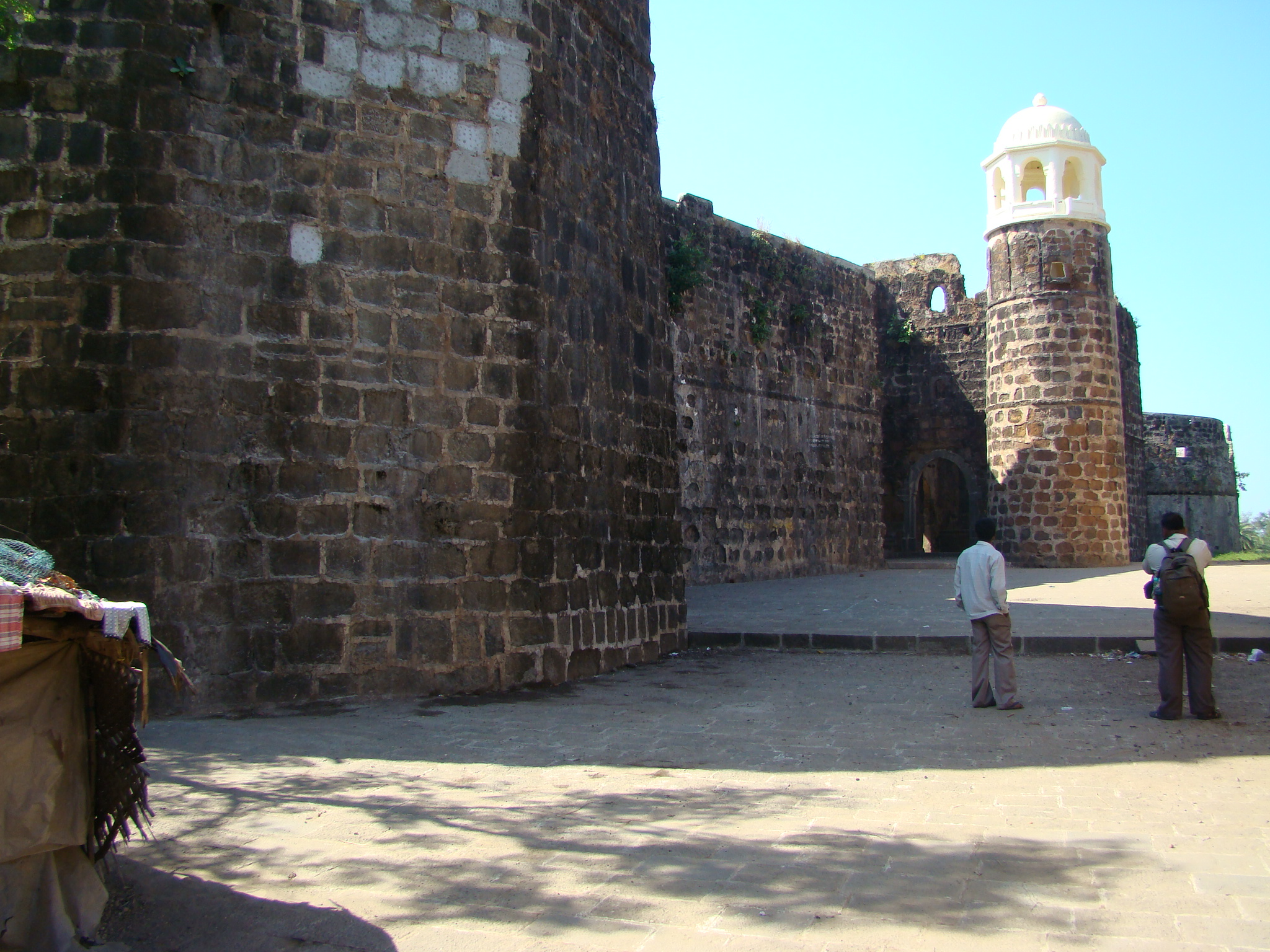
- Shirgaon fort

Site information
- Type: Sea Fort
- Owner: Government of India
- Controlled by: Ahmadnagar (1521-1594); Portugal (1594); Maratha Empire (1739-1818); United Kingdom: East India Company (1818-1857); British Raj (1857-1947); India (1947-)
- Open to the public: Yes
- Condition: Ruins

Location
- Shown within Maharashtra
- Location within Maharashtra Location within India
- Coordinates: 19°41′46.2″N 72°42′48.6″E
- Height: at MSL

Site history
- Materials: Black Basalt Stone

Shirgaon Fort / Shirgao Fort (Marathi: शिरगाव किल्ला) is a fort located 6.5 km from Palghar, in Palghar district, of Maharashtra. This fort is in very good condition. The outer walls, steps, parapets, bastions etc. in solid masonry are in excellent order and worth seeing. The fort is located in the Shirgaon village.

== History ==
This fort was built during Yadava of Devgiri in 1225 A.D. This fort was under the Gujarati Musalman rulers in 1432, followed by the Bahamani Dynasty. After the defeat of Bahamani dynasty, the fort was under the Ahmednagar Sultanate for a short period. All the forts close to Vasai fort were won by Portuguese in 1520–1533. In November 1737 Maratha army tried to capture the fort but, retreated in December 1737. After the siege of Vasai fort, Maratha army captured the fort on 22 January 1739. The Marathas repaired the fort in 1772. The Fort was captured by British in 1818.

== How to reach ==
The nearest town is Palghar which is 109 km from Mumbai. The base village of the fort is Shirgaon. There are good hotels at Palghar and Shirgaon. Palghar is well connected by Road and rail route.

== Places to see ==
The Fort is rectangular in shape. The entrance gate is east facing immediately followed by another gate at a right angle to the earlier. There is the year 1714 inscribed on near the second gate. There are total five bastions. The four bastions at the four corners are octagonal, while the fifth one at the entrance gate is circular. The vestibules for guards near the entrance gate are in good condition. It takes about an hour to walk around the parapet wall and visit all the places of the fort.

== See also ==
- List of forts in Maharashtra
- List of forts in India
- Chimaji Appa
- Marathi People
- Maratha Navy
- List of Maratha dynasties and states
- Battles involving the Maratha Empire
- Maratha Army
- Maratha titles
- Military history of India
