= Shiragaon =

- Village
- Interactive map of Shiragaon
- Coordinates: 16°13′17″N 74°39′28″E
- Country: India
- State: Karnataka
- District: Belagavi
- Talukas: Hukkeri

Population (2011)
  - Total: 3,644

Languages
  - Official: Kannada
- Time zone: UTC+5:30 (IST)
- Postal code: 591309
- ISO 3166 code: IN-KA

Shiragaon is a village in Hukkeri taluka of Belagavi district of Karnataka, India.

== Demographics ==
As per 2011 census data, the village has a total population of 3,644 of which 1,824 are males and 1,820 are females.
