= T. S. Patil =

Indian politician

Tukaram Shankar Patil

Member of Parliament (India)
- In office 1960–1962
- Preceded by: Laxman Shrawan Bhatkar
- Constituency: Akola
- In office 1960–1962

Personal details
- Born: 19 December 1900 Dabhadi, Bombay Presidency
- Died: Malkapur, Buldhana
- Party: Indian National Congress
- Children: 2 sons
- Education: Fergusson College, Pune (1920)
- Profession: Barrister

T. S. Patil was the Member of Parliament for Akola Lok Sabha constituency from 1960 to 1962. He was elected in a By-election.
