= Gautala Autramghat Sanctuary =

Protected Wildlife Sanctuary in Maharashtra, India

Gautala Autramghat Wildlife Sanctuary
- IUCN category IV (habitat/species management area)
- Location within Maharashtra Location within India
- Interactive map of Gautala Autramghat Wildlife Sanctuary
- Location: Aurangabad district, Jalgaon District Maharashtra, India
- Nearest city: Kannad and Chalisgaon
- Coordinates: 20°19′57.0″N 75°08′27.0″E
- Area: 260.61 km^{2} (100.62 sq mi)
- Established: 1986
- Governing body: Maharashtra State Forest Department

List of Wildlife Sanctuaries in Maharashtra, India
Sr. No.	Name of Sanctuary	Place/ Location	Key Wildlife Species
1	Tipeshwar Wildlife Sanctuary	Yavatmal District	Tiger Hotspot
2	Umred-Pauni- Karhandle Wildlife Sanctuary	Nagpur District	Bengal Tiger
3	Nagzira Wildlife Sanctuary	Gondhia District	Bengal Tiger
4	Bor Tiger Reserve	Across Wardha and Nagpur District	Bengal Tiger
5	Melghat Wildlife Sanctuary	Amravati District	Forest Owlets, Bengal Tiger
6	Koka Wildlife Sanctuary	Bhandara District	Bengal Tiger, Leopard
7	Bhamragarh Wildlife Sanctuary	Gadchiroli District	Sloth Bear
8	Dnyanganga Wildlife Sanctuary	Buldhana District	Chital (Spotted Deer)
9	Katepurna Wildlife Sanctuary	Akola District	Leopard
10	Mansingdeo Wildlife Sanctuary	Nagpur District	Tiger
11	Chikaldara Wildliffe Sanctuary	Amravati District	Bengal Tiger
12	Painganga Wildliffe Sanctuary	located across the Yavatmal and Nanded Districts	Leopard
13	Karanja Sohol Wildlife Sacntuary	Washim District	Blackbuck
14	Wan Wildlife Sanctuary	Across Akola and Amravati District	Leopard
15	Ambabarwa Wildlife Sanctuary	Buldhana District	Leopard
16	Bhimashankar Wildlife Sanctuary	Across Pune and Raigad District	Indian Giant Squirrel
17	Koyna Wildlife Sanctuary	Satara District	Leopard
18	Radhanagari Wildlife Sanctuary	Kolhapur District	Gaur ( Indian Bison)
19	Chandoli Wildlife Sanctuary	Across Sangli, Kolhapur, Satara and Ratnagiri District	Leopard
20	Mayureshwar Wildlife Sanctuary	Pune District	Blackbuck
21	Toranmal Wildlife Sanctuary	Nandurbar District	Leopard
22	Rehekuri Blackbuck Sanctuary	Solapur District	Blackbuck
23	Kalsubai – Harishchandragad Wildlife Sanctuary	Across Nashik, Ahmednagar (Ahilyanagar) and Pune District	Leopard
24	Supe Wildlife Sanctuary	Ahmednagar (Ahilyanagar)	Blackbuck
25	Nannaj Wildlife Sanctuary	Solapur District	Great Indian Bustard
26	Sagareshwar Wildlife Sanctuary	Sangli District	Blackbuck
27	Gautala – Autramghat Wildlife Sanctuary	Across Chhatrapati Sambhajinagar (Aurangabad) and Jalgoan District	Leopard
28	Jayakwadi Wildlife Sanctuary	Across Chhatrapati Sambhajinagar (Aurangabad) and Beed District	Migratory Birds (Ex. Flamingos, Common Teal, Northern Pintail, Garganey, Common Pochard, etc.)
29	Nandur Madhameshwar Wildlife Sanctuary	Nashik District	Migratory Water Birds (Ex. Flamingos, Common Teal, Northern Pintail, Black Tailed Godwit, Eurasian Curlew, etc.)
30	Naygaon Wildlife Sanctuary	Beed District	Blackbuck
31	Yedshi – Ramling Ghat Wildlife Sanctuary	Dharashiv (Osmanabad) District	Leopard
32	Malvan Marine Wildlife Sanctuary	Sindhudurg District	Coral reefs and Marine Life
33	Phansad Wildlife Sanctuary	Raigad District	Indian Giant Squirrel
34	Tansa Wildlife Sanctuary	Across Palghar and Thane District	Leopard
35	Karnala Wildlife Sanctuary	Raigad District	Bird ( Specially – Karnala Ashy Minivet)
36	Yawal Wildlife Sanctuary	Jalgaon District	Leopard

References :

· https://www.thrillophilia.com/wildlife-sanctuaries-in-maharashtra

· https://mahaforest.gov.in/index.php/sanctuaries/index/en

· https://testbook.com/mpsc-preparation/wildlife-sanctuaries-in-maharashtra

Chart definition page not found.

The Gautala Autramghat Wildlife Sanctuary is a protected area of Maharashtra state, India. It lies in the Satmala and Ajanta hill ranges of the Western Ghats, and administratively is in Aurangabad District and Jalgaon District. The wildlife sanctuary was established in 1986 in an existing reserved forest area.

It covers a total area of 26,061.19 hectares (64,399 acres) with Reserved Forest Areas of 19706 ha. in Aurangabad and 6355.19 ha. in Jalgaon. Its name comes the nearby village of Gautala, which was itself named after Gautam Rishi, a Hindu ascetic mentioned in the Ramcharitmanas.

Inside the dense forest there is lake called gautala where some people used to be live and cattle grazing from which the place and forest named gautala Gau (Cow).

== Wildlife ==
There are many species of animals like reptiles, mammals, and insects found here. More than 240 various bird species live here including Spoonbill, Peafowl, and Crane. In sanctuary areas, there are also many ancient temples, caves, lakes, and waterfalls which are attracted by tourists. The wildlife is well protected by the Maharashtra government, announced this place as a sanctuary established in 1986.

== Ecology ==
The area has southern tropical dry deciduous forest with interspersed bush and grasslands.This topography supports wide variety of flora and fauna.

=== Fauna ===
The wildlife include wide variety of animals. They are chinkara (Gazella bennettii), nilgai (antelope) (Boselaphus tragocamelus), sloth bears (Melursus ursinus), jungle cat (Felis chaus), brown palm civet (Paradoxurus jerdoni), muntjac (barking deer) (Muntiacus muntjak), hare (Lepus nigricollis), leopard, fox, jackal, bats, wild boar, gray langur (Semnopithecus entellus), and wolf (Canis lupus pallipes). Total 240 bird species have been observed in and around the sanctuary, among them are cranes, spoonbills, storks, ibis, pochards, peafowl, quail, partridges, and various species of wading birds. Snakes include the cobra (Naja naja), common krait (Bungarus caeruleus), and rat snake (Ptyas mucosus).

=== Flora ===
The hill tops in the sanctuary are grass lands where as most of the forest trees occur on the slopes.Trees include teak (Tectona grandis), anjan (Hardwickia binata), oil cake tree (Albizia amara), sandalwood (Santalum album), bel (Aegle marmelos), awla (Phyllanthus emblica), bhallatak (Semecarpus anacardium), and moha (Madhuca longifolia).

== How to reach ==
The sanctuary is well connected by road. It is about 75 km from Chhatrapati Sambhajinagar (Aurangabad) and 40 km from Chalisgaon city. The nearest rail head is Chalisgaon and airport is at Chhatrapati Sambhajinagar (Aurangabad) also nearby towns Kannad City from where 2 to 3 Bus are available from Kannad in a day.

== Features ==
- Pitalkhora caves, rock-cut, Buddhist caves, from the 2nd century BCE to 1st century CE
- Patnadevi Temple
- Mahadeva Temple
- Sita Khori a waterfall

There are many temples, waterfalls, viewpoints and caves are present for tourists.
