= Shirgaon Census Town =

- Census Town
- Interactive map of Shirgaon Census Town
- Country: India
- State: Maharashtra
- District: Palghar

Languages
  - Official: Marathi
- Time zone: UTC+5:30 (IST)

Shirgaon Census Town is a Census Town situated at Palghar district of the State of Maharashtra, India.

== Geography ==
The total geographical area of Shirgaon census town is 8 square kilometers which makes it the 3rd biggest census town by area in the Palghar district.

== Demographics ==
The total has a population of 5,971 people out of which 3,097 are males and 2,874 are females. The average human sex ratio of Shirgaon is 928.

== Literacy ==
According to the 2011 Indian Census The total literacy rate of Shirgaon is 88.18 percent which is higher than average literacy rate of 82.34 percent in Maharashtra. The male literacy rate was 93.36 percent and the female literacy rate was 82.55 percent.
