= Kannad =

- Location in Maharashtra, India
- Coordinates: 20.27°N 75.13°E
- Country: India
- State: Maharashtra
- District: Chhatrapati Sambhajinagar (Aurangabad)
- Elevation: 633 m (2,077 ft)

Language
  - Official Req =: Marathi
- Postal code: 431103
- ISO 3166 code: IN-MH
- Website: Official

Kannad is a Taluka and a Municipal Council city in Aurangabad (CS Nagar) District in the Indian state of Maharashtra.
