= Anjali Damania =

Indian politician

Personal details
- Party: Aam Aadmi Party (2012—2015)
- Spouse: Anish Damania
- Children: 2
- Education: Graduation
- Occupation: Politician
- Profession: Lab technician

Anjali Anish Damania is an Indian anti-corruption activist and politician. She was the convener of Maharashtra state unit of Aam Admi Party (AAP).

During 2011–12, she exposed corruption in the Kondhane dam project through RTI queries. She came into the limelight in 2012, after she accused the Bharatiya Janata Party President Nitin Gadkari of having a business partnership with the Nationalist Congress Party chief Sharad Pawar.

She unsuccessfully contested 2014 Lok Sabha elections from Nagpur, as an AAP candidate against Gadkari. However, in March 2015, she quit the AAP amid allegations of horse trading against national convener and Delhi CM Arvind Kejriwal. She has filed several PIL's against powerful politicians like Chhagan Bhujbal and Eknath Khadse. On 2 June 2016 she went on an indefinite hunger strike demanding the resignation of Eknath Khadse, which resulted in Khadse's resignation from the position of Maharashtra state Revenue Minister.

== Anti-Corruption Activism ==
=== Eknath Khadse matter ===
Anjali Damania accused Khadse of misuse of office and corruption on his Bhosari MIDC land grabbing matter. She went on hunger strike against Khadse and demanded probe. She filed PIL against him. Khadse, in retaliation, filed a case against her in Muktainagar police station for making alleged false and defamatory statements against him.

=== Kondhane dam issue ===
A pathologist by profession, Anjali Damania owned a 30-acre farm in the Kondivade village of Raigad district. In 2011, the government sent her a notice, stating that her land would be acquired for the construction of the Kondhane dam. In June 2011, she sent a letter to the Irrigation Department, asking for location of the dam as she wanted to check if her land would be submerged. She then went out of the country. When she returned in August, she found that the work on the dam had already started. She filed the RTI queries to know more about the project. Initially, she did not get any replies. After complaining to the Chief Information Commissioner (CIC), she received responses and found several irregularities. She found that the cost of the project had escalated from ₹560 million (US$5.8 million) to ₹3.28 billion (US$34 million) in just one month after the contract was awarded. This increase was a result of a local elected representative's demand that the height of the dam be increased from 39 meters to 71 meters. In April 2012, along with another landowner Ajay Mathankar, she filed a Public Interest Litigation (PIL) in the Bombay High Court. The litigation ultimately forced the government to cancel the tender for the project. She also noticed similar cost escalations in other projects: the Kalu dam in Thane district, the Balganga dam in Raigad district and the Shai dam in the Thane district. The irregularities were found to be part of the bigger Maharashtra Irrigation Scam exposed by Vijay Pandhare.

=== Accusations against Nitin Gadkari ===
In September 2012, Vijay Pandhare's letter detailing the Maharashtra Irrigation Scam was leaked to the media, leading to the resignation of irrigation minister Ajit Pawar (nephew of the Nationalist Congress Party chief Sharad Pawar). Subsequently, Anjali Damania claimed that she had met the Bharatiya Janata Party (BJP) President Nitin Gadkari thrice – twice in 2011 and once on 14 August 2012 – requesting him to pursue such cases in public interest. She alleged that Gadkari told her that he had a business relationship with Sharad Pawar, and therefore, he would not pursue the case. Gadkari rejected the allegations, saying that he had never met Damania, and sued her for defamation. The BJP denied any link between Gadkari and Pawar.

She also alleged that Gadkari tried to prevent the BJP leader Kirit Somaiya from filing a PIL against the scam. In October 2012, she told media that Gadkari had misused his political contacts to usurp agricultural land in Khursapur for his firm Purti Power and Sugar Ltd (PPSL), but did not provide any evidence of this. The Times of India followed up on her allegations, and revealed that the company's shareholders included several shell corporations. Subsequently, the income tax department raided Gadkari's companies and associated firms. Gadkari had to step down as the BJP President in January 2013, after several party leaders including Yashwant Sinha protested against him. In December 2013, Gadkari stated that no evidence of corruption had been found against him despite all the investigations and the media hype. Damania refused to back out from her charges against Gadkari.

== Political career ==
She joined the India Against Corruption (IAC) movement of Anna Hazare in 2011. After IAC split, she joined the Aam Aadmi Party, and became the convener of its Maharashtra unit.

=== 2014 Lok Sabha election ===
Damania contested 2014 general election unsuccessfully from Nagpur constituency. She secured 69,081 votes. She lost to former BJP president Nitin Gadkari who secured 587,767 votes.

On 5 June 2014, she announced her resignation from AAP, without stating any reason for her exit.

== Personal life ==
Anjali Damania's husband Anish Damania is the CEO at J M Financials and Honorary Advisor to Maharashtra Institution for Transformation (MITRA). The couple have two children. According to Damania, her father was in the RSS, so she was brought up in an anti-corruption atmosphere. She obtained a diploma in Medical lab Technology from Premlila Vithaldas Polytechnic, Mumbai and later a Fellowship in Medical Laboratory Technology.
