= Dhikale =

Dhikale is a surname. People with the surname include:

- Rahul Uttamrao Dhikale
- Uttamrao Dhikale
