= Sinnar Assembly constituency =

Constituency of the Maharashtra legislative assembly in India

Coordinates: 19.85°N 73.99°E

Sinnar
- Constituency No. 120 for the Maharashtra Legislative Assembly

Constituency details
- Country: India
- Region: Western India
- State: Maharashtra
- District: Nashik
- Lok Sabha constituency: Nashik
- Established: 1955
- Total electors: 324,867
- Reservation: None

Member of Legislative Assembly
- 15th Maharashtra Legislative Assembly
- Incumbent Adv. Manikrao Kokate
- Party: NCP
- Alliance: NDA
- Elected year: 2024

Sinnar Assembly constituency is one of the fifteen constituencies of the Maharashtra Vidhan Sabha located in Nashik district. It is a part of Nashik Lok Sabha constituency along with five other assembly constituencies, namely, Nashik East, Nashik Central, Nashik West, Deolali (SC) and Igatpuri (ST).

== Members of the Legislative Assembly ==
Year	Member	Party
1957	Navale Shankar Kondaji	Praja Socialist Party
1962	Shankar Balaji Waje	Indian National Congress
1967	Ramkrishna Narayan Naik	Indian National Congress
1972	Ramkrishna Narayan Naik	Indian National Congress
1978	Gadhak Suryabhan Sukdeo	Independent politician
1980	Gadhak Suryabhan Sukdeo	Indian National Congress
1985	Dighole Tukaram Sakharam	Indian Congress
1990	Dighole Tukaram Sakharam	Indian National Congress
1995	Dighole Tukaram Sakharam	Independent politician
1999	Manikrao Shivajirao Kokate	Shiv Sena
2004	Manikrao Shivajirao Kokate	Shiv Sena
2009	Manikrao Shivajirao Kokate	Indian National Congress
2014	Rajabhau (Parag) Prakash Waje	Shiv Sena
2019	Manikrao Shivajirao Kokate	Nationalist Congress Party
2024	Manikrao Shivajirao Kokate	Nationalist Congress Party

== Election results ==
=== Assembly Election 2024 ===
2024 Maharashtra Legislative Assembly election : Sinnar
Party	Candidate	Votes	%	±%
NCP	Manikrao Shivajirao Kokate	138,565	57.36	New
NCP-SP	Uday Punjaji Sangale	97,681	40.43	New
Independent	Sagar Pandurang Sangale	2,275	0.94	New
NOTA	None of the Above	1,813	0.75	▼0.12
Margin of victory		40,884	16.92	▲15.87
Turnout		243,403	74.92	▲9.06
Total valid votes		241,590		
Registered electors		324,867		
NCP gain from NCP		Swing	▲8.17	

=== Assembly Election 2019 ===
2019 Maharashtra Legislative Assembly election : Sinnar
Party	Candidate	Votes	%	±%
NCP	Manikrao Shivajirao Kokate	97,011	49.19	▲48.14
SS	Rajabhau (Parag) Prakash Waje	94,939	48.14	▼4.99
VBA	Vikram Murlidhar Katkade	2,886	1.46	New
NOTA	None of the Above	1,709	0.87	▲0.41
Margin of victory		2,072	1.05	▼9.45
Turnout		199,276		▼5.86
Total valid votes		197,226		
Registered electors		301,994		
NCP gain from SS		Swing	▼3.94	

=== Assembly Election 2014 ===
2014 Maharashtra Legislative Assembly election : Sinnar
Party	Candidate	Votes	%	±%
SS	Rajabhau (Parag) Prakash Waje	104,031	53.13	▲6.44
BJP	Manikrao Shivajirao Kokate	83,477	42.63	New
INC	Kale Sampat Santu	3,319	1.69	▼46.80
NCP	Garje Shubhangi Suresh	2,052	1.05	New
BSP	Dr. Shashikant Chandrakant Gaikwad	1,520	0.78	▼0.15
NOTA	None of the Above	899	0.46	New
Margin of victory		20,554	10.50	▲8.68
Turnout		196,771		▲7.27
Total valid votes		195,821		
Registered electors		275,145		
SS gain from INC		Swing	▲4.63	

=== Assembly Election 2009 ===
2009 Maharashtra Legislative Assembly election : Sinnar
Party	Candidate	Votes	%	±%
INC	Manikrao Shivajirao Kokate	75,630	48.50	New
SS	Waje Prakash Shankarrao	72,800	46.68	▼3.34
Independent	Dnyaneshwar Bahiru Bhosale	1,868	1.20	New
Shivrajya Party	Avhad Mahesh Zunjar	1,494	0.96	New
BSP	Barke Gopal Chindhu	1,438	0.92	▼0.10
Margin of victory		2,830	1.81	▼12.97
Turnout		156,097	63.96	▼8.07
Total valid votes		155,939		
Registered electors		244,047		▲29.75
INC gain from SS		Swing	▼1.53	

=== Assembly Election 2004 ===
2004 Maharashtra Legislative Assembly election : Sinnar
Party	Candidate	Votes	%	±%
SS	Manikrao Shivajirao Kokate	67,722	50.03	▼8.39
NCP	Tukaram Sakharam Dighole	47,708	35.24	▼2.53
Independent	Garje Suresh Dhondu	13,292	9.82	New
Independent	Dr. T. K. Sadgir	3,964	2.93	New
BSP	Gade Shantaram Balkrishna (Bhau)	1,384	1.02	New
Kranti Kari Jai Hind Sena	Chandrakant Amrut Joshi (Sir)	1,296	0.96	New
Margin of victory		20,014	14.79	▼5.87
Turnout		135,382	71.98	▼0.41
Total valid votes		135,366		
Registered electors		188,094		▲20.37
SS hold		Swing	▼8.39	

=== Assembly Election 1999 ===
1999 Maharashtra Legislative Assembly election : Sinnar
Party	Candidate	Votes	%	±%
SS	Manikrao Shivajirao Kokate	66,072	58.42	▲27.17
NCP	Dighole Tukaram Sakharam	42,715	37.77	New
INC	Ghumare Bhagwatrao Revaji	4,304	3.81	▼21.47
Margin of victory		23,357	20.65	▲14.53
Turnout		117,452	75.17	▼3.54
Total valid votes		113,091		
Registered electors		156,257		▲1.69
SS gain from Independent		Swing	▲21.05	

=== Assembly Election 1995 ===
1995 Maharashtra Legislative Assembly election : Sinnar
Party	Candidate	Votes	%	±%
Independent	Dighole Tukaram Sakharam	43,600	37.38	New
SS	Deshmukh Digambar Jayawantrao	36,458	31.25	▲11.15
INC	Shinde Bhagirath Nivrutti	29,487	25.28	▼25.30
BBM	Avhad Kondaji Raoba	3,750	3.21	New
Independent	Kakad Netaji Eknath	1,949	1.67	New
Margin of victory		7,142	6.12	▼15.80
Turnout		119,950	78.06	▲11.33
Total valid votes		116,654		
Registered electors		153,656		▲7.19
Independent gain from INC		Swing	▼13.20	

=== Assembly Election 1990 ===
1990 Maharashtra Legislative Assembly election : Sinnar
Party	Candidate	Votes	%	±%
INC	Dighole Tukaram Sakharam	46,830	50.58	▲29.44
JD	Gadhak Suryabhan Sukdeo	26,536	28.66	New
SS	Deshmukh Digambar Jayawantrao	18,611	20.10	New
Margin of victory		20,294	21.92	▲2.21
Turnout		94,271	65.76	▲0.31
Total valid votes		92,587		
Registered electors		143,355		▲24.67
INC gain from IC(S)		Swing	▲2.13	

=== Assembly Election 1985 ===
1985 Maharashtra Legislative Assembly election : Sinnar
Party	Candidate	Votes	%	±%
IC(S)	Dighole Tukaram Sakharam	35,810	48.45	New
Independent	Gadhak Suryabhan Sukdeo	21,241	28.74	New
INC	Daware Nivrutti Bajunath	15,626	21.14	New
Margin of victory		14,569	19.71	▼26.80
Turnout		75,388	65.56	▲4.59
Total valid votes		73,913		
Registered electors		114,987		▲6.61
IC(S) gain from INC(U)		Swing	▼24.00	

=== Assembly Election 1980 ===
1980 Maharashtra Legislative Assembly election : Sinnar
Party	Candidate	Votes	%	±%
INC(U)	Gadhak Suryabhan Sukdeo	46,639	72.45	New
INC(I)	Waje Ashok Vithal	16,699	25.94	New
Margin of victory		29,940	46.51	▲27.64
Turnout		65,667	60.88	▼9.50
Total valid votes		64,377		
Registered electors		107,860		▲7.90
INC(U) gain from Independent		Swing	▲20.03	

=== Assembly Election 1978 ===
1978 Maharashtra Legislative Assembly election : Sinnar
Party	Candidate	Votes	%	±%
Independent	Gadhak Suryabhan Sukdeo	36,255	52.42	New
INC	Avhad Nivrutti Mahadu	23,205	33.55	▼19.53
JP	Sangle Sudam Bhaguji	6,847	9.90	New
Independent	Bhalerao Kaleshwar Bhiwaji	2,006	2.90	New
Independent	Avadh Zunzar Mhasuji	854	1.23	New
Margin of victory		13,050	18.87	▲9.37
Turnout		71,044	71.07	▲3.35
Total valid votes		69,167		
Registered electors		99,967		▲10.46
Independent gain from INC		Swing	▼0.66	

=== Assembly Election 1972 ===
1972 Maharashtra Legislative Assembly election : Sinnar
Party	Candidate	Votes	%	±%
INC	Ramkrishna Narayan Naik	31,628	53.08	▲22.11
Independent	Waje Shankarrao Balaji	25,967	43.58	New
ABJS	Avad Mahadeo Bala	1,040	1.75	New
RPI	Ganga Sakharam Roopawate	685	1.15	New
Margin of victory		5,661	9.50	▲9.14
Turnout		61,313	67.75	▲9.26
Total valid votes		59,591		
Registered electors		90,504		▲22.91
INC hold		Swing	▲22.11	

=== Assembly Election 1967 ===
1967 Maharashtra Legislative Assembly election : Sinnar
Party	Candidate	Votes	%	±%
INC	Ramkrishna Narayan Naik	12,901	30.96	▼16.9
Independent	A. G. Durve	12,750	30.60	New
Independent	L. T. Harak	10,898	26.16	New
PWPI	P. B. Kathale	3,249	7.80	New
Independent	R. N. Rajebhonsale	1,121	2.69	New
Independent	W. P. Bhat	745	1.79	New
Margin of victory		151	0.36	▼6.95
Turnout		45,751	62.13	▼5.01
Total valid votes		41,664		
Registered electors		73,635		▲8.39
INC hold		Swing	▼16.90	

=== Assembly Election 1962 ===
1962 Maharashtra Legislative Assembly election : Sinnar
Party	Candidate	Votes	%	±%
INC	Shankar Balaji Waje	20,027	47.86	▲18.98
CPI	Gangadhar Wamanrao Chavanke	16,967	40.55	New
PSP	Dharma Bhavanji Avha	3,841	9.18	▼58.48
Independent	Dattatraya Nathu Hande	1,009	2.41	New
Margin of victory		3,060	7.31	▼31.46
Turnout		45,268	66.63	▼11.89
Total valid votes		41,844		
Registered electors		67,938		▲23.90
INC gain from PSP		Swing	▼19.80	

=== Assembly Election 1957 ===
1957 Bombay State Legislative Assembly election : Sinnar
Party	Candidate	Votes	%	±%
PSP	Navale Shankar Kondaji	27,260	67.66	New
INC	Naik Vasantrao Narayan	11,637	28.88	New
Independent	Avad Laxman Namdeo	734	1.82	New
Independent	Pagar Rangnath Dhondiram	661	1.64	New
Margin of victory		15,623	38.77	
Turnout		40,292	73.48	
Total valid votes		40,292		
Registered electors		54,832		
PSP win (new seat)				

== See also ==
- Sinnar
