= Uttamrao =

Uttamrao is a name that originated from India. People with the name include:

- Dahake Prakash Uttamrao, Indian politician
- Narayanrao Uttamrao Deshmukh, Indian politician
- Rahul Uttamrao Dhikale, Indian politician
- Sanjay Uttamrao Deshmukh (born 1968), Indian politician
- Uttamrao Dhikale, Indian politician
- Uttamrao Jankar, Indian politician
- Uttamrao Patil, Indian politician
- Uttamrao Deorao Patil (1944–2012), Indian politician
