= Vasant Pawar =

Indian politician

Member of Parliament, Lok Sabha
- In office 1991-1996
- Preceded by: Daulatrao Aher
- Succeeded by: Rajaram Godase
- Constituency: Nashik, Maharashtra

Personal details
- Born: 4 April 1948 Panchavati, Nasik district, Bombay Presidency
- Party: Indian National Congress
- Other political affiliations: Nationalist Congress Party
- Spouse: Nilima Pawar
- Website: http://www.drvasantpawar.com

Vasant Nivruttirao Pawar is an Indian politician. He was elected to the Lok Sabha, the lower house of the Parliament of India as a member of the Indian National Congress.
