= Nashik Assembly constituency =

Former constituency of the Maharashtra legislative assembly in India

Nashik
- Former constituency for the Maharashtra Legislative Assembly

Constituency details
- Country: India
- Region: Western India
- State: Maharashtra
- Lok Sabha constituency: Nashik
- Established: 1955
- Abolished: 2008

Nashik Vidhan Sabha seat was one of the constituencies of Maharashtra Vidhan Sabha, in India. It was a segment of Nashik Lok Sabha constituency. Nashik seat existed until the 2004 elections after which it became defunct in 2008.

== Members of Vidhan Sabha ==
Year	Member	Party
1957	Kamble S. L. (Sc)	Scheduled Castes Federation
1957	Pandurang Mahadeo Murkute	Indian National Congress
1962	Vasant Narayan Naik	Indian National Congress
1967	Vasant Narayan Naik	Indian National Congress
1972	Lonari Vilas Murlidhar	Indian National Congress
1978	Upadhye Vasant Ganesh	Janata Party
1980	Wavare Shantarambapu Kondaji	Independent politician
1985	Dr. Daulatrao Aher Sonuji	Bharatiya Janata Party
1990	Kathe Ganpatrao Pundalik	Bharatiya Janata Party
1995	Dr. Daulatrao Aher Sonuji	Bharatiya Janata Party
1999	Dr. Daulatrao Aher Sonuji	Bharatiya Janata Party
2004	Bachhav Shobha Dinesh	Indian National Congress

== Election results ==
=== Assembly Election 2004 ===
2004 Maharashtra Legislative Assembly election : Nashik
Party	Candidate	Votes	%	±%
INC	Bachhav Shobha Dinesh	85,786	45.38%	▲24.99
BJP	Dr. Daulatrao Aher Sonuji	79,625	42.12%	▼5.39
CPI(M)	Dr. D. L.Karad	15,415	8.15%	New
BSP	Sayyad Mushir Muniroddin	5,594	2.96%	New
Margin of victory		6,161	3.26%	▼12.15
Turnout		1,89,086	42.94%	▼1.98
Total valid votes		1,89,037		
Registered electors		4,40,300		▲27.69
INC gain from BJP		Swing	▼2.13	

=== Assembly Election 1999 ===
1999 Maharashtra Legislative Assembly election : Nashik
Party	Candidate	Votes	%	±%
BJP	Dr. Daulatrao Aher Sonuji	73,591	47.51%	▼0.70
NCP	Dr. Pawar Vasant Nivrutti	49,717	32.10%	New
INC	Chhajed Jayprakash Jitmal	31,576	20.39%	▼2.85
Margin of victory		23,874	15.41%	▼9.56
Turnout		1,60,608	46.58%	▼14.96
Total valid votes		1,54,884		
Registered electors		3,44,826		▲4.94
BJP hold		Swing	▼0.70	

=== Assembly Election 1995 ===
1995 Maharashtra Legislative Assembly election : Nashik
Party	Candidate	Votes	%	±%
BJP	Dr. Daulatrao Aher Sonuji	94,852	48.21%	▼0.06
INC	Mane Murlidhar Pandurang	45,717	23.24%	▼20.82
Independent	Wavare Shantarambapu Kondaji	31,170	15.84%	New
CPI(M)	Adv. Sou. Karad Vasudha Dhondiram	11,306	5.75%	New
SAP	Patil Gopal Baburao	2,603	1.32%	New
Independent	Jadhav Sampatrao Rambhau	1,777	0.90%	New
Independent	Khandave Panditrao Runjaji	1,586	0.81%	New
Margin of victory		49,135	24.97%	▲20.76
Turnout		2,00,041	60.88%	▲6.20
Total valid votes		1,96,745		
Registered electors		3,28,590		▲32.13
BJP hold		Swing	▼0.06	

=== Assembly Election 1990 ===
1990 Maharashtra Legislative Assembly election : Nashik
Party	Candidate	Votes	%	±%
BJP	Kathe Ganpatrao Pundalik	64,425	48.27%	▲3.72
INC	Khaire Pandharinath Sadhavrao	58,801	44.05%	▲1.96
JD	Chavan Shantaram (Bhau) Pandurang	8,937	6.70%	New
Margin of victory		5,624	4.21%	▲1.77
Turnout		1,35,088	54.32%	▼1.45
Total valid votes		1,33,480		
Registered electors		2,48,682		▲45.26
BJP hold		Swing	▲3.72	

=== Assembly Election 1985 ===
1985 Maharashtra Legislative Assembly election : Nashik
Party	Candidate	Votes	%	±%
BJP	Dr. Daulatrao Aher Sonuji	42,030	44.54%	▲13.43
INC	Chhajed Jayprakash Jitmal	39,721	42.09%	New
RPI	Kardak Waman Tabaji	7,759	8.22%	New
Independent	Sanap Vijay Bhaurao	2,161	2.29%	New
Independent	Thorat Keshav Yashwant	1,703	1.80%	New
Margin of victory		2,309	2.45%	▼1.44
Turnout		95,357	55.70%	▲7.09
Total valid votes		94,363		
Registered electors		1,71,195		▲15.58
BJP gain from Independent		Swing	▲9.54	

=== Assembly Election 1980 ===
1980 Maharashtra Legislative Assembly election : Nashik
Party	Candidate	Votes	%	±%
Independent	Wavare Shantarambapu Kondaji	24,900	35.00%	New
BJP	Kathe Ganpatrao Pundalik	22,133	31.11%	New
INC(I)	Chhajed Jayprakash Jitmal	18,802	26.43%	▼13.72
JP	Upadhaya Vasant Ganesh	4,846	6.81%	▼35.68
Margin of victory		2,767	3.89%	▲1.55
Turnout		72,097	48.68%	▼13.67
Total valid votes		71,141		
Registered electors		1,48,113		▲18.38
Independent gain from JP		Swing	▼7.49	

=== Assembly Election 1978 ===
1978 Maharashtra Legislative Assembly election : Nashik
Party	Candidate	Votes	%	±%
JP	Upadhye Vasant Ganesh	32,809	42.50%	New
INC(I)	Wavare Shantarambapu Kondaji	31,001	40.15%	New
INC	Lonari Vilas Murlidhar	10,605	13.74%	▼49.30
Independent	Kansara Damodar Parasharam	1,756	2.27%	New
Margin of victory		1,808	2.34%	▼28.87
Turnout		78,576	62.80%	▲8.36
Total valid votes		77,206		
Registered electors		1,25,118		▲17.20
JP gain from INC		Swing	▼20.54	

=== Assembly Election 1972 ===
1972 Maharashtra Legislative Assembly election : Nashik
Party	Candidate	Votes	%	±%
INC	Lonari Vilas Murlidhar	35,894	63.03%	▲15.30
ABJS	Kathe Ganpatrao Pundalik	18,121	31.82%	▼7.49
Independent	Dashrath Kisan Tambe	1,687	2.96%	New
CPI(M)	Ramdas Laxman Khaire	955	1.68%	New
Margin of victory		17,773	31.21%	▲22.79
Turnout		58,062	54.39%	▼4.59
Total valid votes		56,946		
Registered electors		1,06,755		▲31.08
INC hold		Swing	▲15.30	

=== Assembly Election 1967 ===
1967 Maharashtra Legislative Assembly election : Nashik
Party	Candidate	Votes	%	±%
INC	Vasant Narayan Naik	22,521	47.73%	▼1.85
ABJS	Bhilkchand Vedushet Vadnagare	18,550	39.31%	▲24.06
Independent	S. H. Bismilla	4,454	9.44%	New
PSP	P. D. Takle	1,122	2.38%	New
Independent	S. K. Rathi	286	0.61%	New
Margin of victory		3,971	8.42%	▼22.53
Turnout		50,951	62.56%	▲2.34
Total valid votes		47,185		
Registered electors		81,441		▲10.21
INC hold		Swing	▼1.85	

=== Assembly Election 1962 ===
1962 Maharashtra Legislative Assembly election : Nashik
Party	Candidate	Votes	%	±%
INC	Vasant Narayan Naik	20,371	49.58%	▲28.04
Independent	Ramchandra Jagannath Pande	7,657	18.64%	New
ABJS	Bhilkchand Vedushet Vadnagare	6,266	15.25%	New
CPI	Ramchandra Namdeo Bhangare	4,810	11.71%	New
Independent	Shivaram Rama Jadhao	1,031	2.51%	New
Independent	Sakhahari Laxman Kambale	495	1.20%	New
Margin of victory		12,714	30.95%	▲28.74
Turnout		44,808	60.64%	▼49.95
Total valid votes		41,085		
Registered electors		73,893		▼36.42
INC gain from SCF		Swing	▲23.26	

=== Assembly Election 1957 ===
1957 Bombay State Legislative Assembly election : Nashik
Party	Candidate	Votes	%	±%
SCF	Kamble S. L. (Sc)	32,287	26.32%	New
PWPI	Vithalrao Ganpatrao Hande	29,587	24.12%	New
INC	Kale Dattatray Tulshiram (Sc)	26,428	21.54%	New
INC	Abad Lakhmichand Ramchandra	23,758	19.37%	New
Independent	Ghute Khanderao Sajan	3,348	2.73%	New
RRP	Barve Indirabai Parshuram	2,597	2.12%	New
Independent	Lokhande Kisan Rajaram (Sc)	2,476	2.02%	New
Margin of victory		2,700	2.20%	New
Turnout		1,22,669	105.55%	
Total valid votes		1,22,669		
Registered electors		1,16,223		New
SCF gain from INC		Swing		

== See also ==
- List of constituencies of Maharashtra Legislative Assembly
