= Sameer Bhujbal =

Indian politician

Member of the India Parliament for Nashik
- In office 4 June 2009 – 16 May 2014
- Preceded by: Devidas Anandrao Pingale
- Succeeded by: Hemant Godse

Personal details
- Born: 9 October 1973 (age 52) Nashik, Maharashtra, India
- Party: Nationalist Congress Party

Sameer Magan Bhujbal (born 9 October 1973) is an Indian politician and a leader of the Nationalist Congress Party. He was member of the 15th Lok Sabha representing Nashik in Maharashtra state in India from 2009 to 2014.

In 2023, he was elected as the NCP President of Mumbai by the Nationalist Congress Party (Ajit Pawar Faction). He is the nephew of senior NCP leader Chhagan Bhujbal.
