= Madhavrao Patil =

Indian politician (1940–2020)

Madhavrao Thete Patil

Member of Parliament, Lok Sabha
- In office 1998-1999
- Preceded by: Rajaram Godase
- Succeeded by: Uttamrao Dhikale
- Constituency: Nashik, Maharashtra

Personal details
- Born: 21 January 1940 Nasik , Bombay Presidency, British India
- Died: 14 June 2020 (aged 80)
- Party: Indian National Congress
- Other political affiliations: Nationalist Congress Party
- Spouse: Hirabai

Madhavrao Thete Patil (21 January 1940 – 14 June 2020) was an Indian politician. He was elected to the Lok Sabha, the lower house of the Parliament of India, as a member of the Indian National Congress. He joined the Nationalist Congress Party in 1999.
