= G H Deshpande =

Indian politician

Member of Parliament, Lok Sabha
- In office 1952–1957
- Succeeded by: Bhaurao Krishnaji Gaikwad
- In office 1962-1963
- Preceded by: Bhaurao Krishnaji Gaikwad
- Succeeded by: Yashwantrao Balwantrao Chavan
- Constituency: Nashik, Maharashtra

Personal details
- Born: 28 September 1902 Nasik, Bombay Presidency, British India
- Party: Indian National Congress
- Spouse: Radhabai

Govind Hari Deshpande was an Indian politician. He was elected to the Lok Sabha, the lower house of the Parliament of India as a member of the Indian National Congress.
