= Vithalrao Hande =

Indian politician

Leader of the Opposition Maharashtra Legislative Council
- In office 23 December 1988 – 20 December 1990
- Chief Minister: Sharad Pawar
- Preceded by: R. S. Gavai
- Succeeded by: R. S. Gavai

Member of Maharashtra Legislative Council
- In office 8 July 1986 – 7 July 1992
- Constituency: elected by Members of Legislative Assembly
- In office 1968–1974
- Constituency: elected by Members of Legislative Assembly

Member of Parliament, Lok Sabha
- In office 1977–1980
- Preceded by: B. R. Kavade
- Succeeded by: Pratap Wagh
- Constituency: Nashik

Member of Maharashtra Legislative Assembly
- In office 1957–1962
- Preceded by: Inaugural holder
- Succeeded by: Vasant Naik
- Constituency: Nashik

Personal details
- Born: 1 October 1920 Adgaon Taluk Nasik district, Bombay Presidency, British India
- Died: 18 November 2013 (aged 93)
- Party: Peasants and Workers Party of India
- Spouse: Sushila Hande
- Children: 4 daughters

Vithalrao Ganpatrao Hande is an Indian politician. He was elected to the Lok Sabha, the lower house of the Parliament of India as a member of the Peasants and Workers Party of India.
