= B. R. Kavade =

Indian politician (1923–2006)

Member of Parliament, Lok Sabha
- In office 1967–1977
- Preceded by: Daulatrao Aher
- Succeeded by: Rajaram Godase
- Constituency: Nashik, Maharashtra

Personal details
- Born: 6 December 1923 Takali, Taluka Nandgaon, Nasik district, Bombay Presidency
- Died: 2006 (aged 82–83)
- Party: Indian National Congress
- Spouse: Jijabai Kavade

Bhanudas Ramchandra Kavade (6 December 1923 – 2006) was an Indian politician. He was elected to the Lok Sabha, the lower house of the Parliament of India as a member of the Indian National Congress. He died in 2006.
