= Muralidhar Mane =

Indian politician

Member of Parliament, Lok Sabha
- In office 1984-1989
- Preceded by: Pratap Wagh
- Succeeded by: Daulatrao Aher
- Constituency: Nashik, Maharashtra

Personal details
- Born: 19 August 1949 (age 76) Sangmeshwar Village, Malegaon Tehsil, Nasik district, Bombay Presidency
- Party: Indian National Congress
- Spouse: Vimal Mane

Muralidhar Mane is an Indian politician. He was elected to the Lok Sabha, the lower house of the Parliament of India as a member of the Indian National Congress.
