= Gadkari (film) =

- Theatrical release poster
- Directed by: Anurag Rajan Bhusari
- Written by: Anurag Rajan Bhusari
- Produced by: Akshay Anant Deshmukh
- Starring: Rahul Chopda; Aishwarya Dorle; Trupti Kalkar; Abhilash Bhusari
- Music by: Ajit Parab; Radhika Bhusari
- Production company: Akshay Deshmukh Films
- Release date: 27 October 2023
- Country: India
- Language: Marathi

Gadkari is a 2023 Indian Marathi-language biopic based on Nitin Gadkari, the Minister for Road Transport & Highways. The film is produced by Akshay Anant Deshmukh under the banner of Akshay Deshmukh Films. The story, screenplay and direction of the film is by Anurag Rajan Bhusari.

== Plot ==
The film depicts Gadkari's struggle, his transition from Jan Sangh to the BJP, his volunteer work with Sangh, and his political path.

== Cast ==
- Rahul Chopda as Nitin Gadkari
- Aishwarya Dorle as Kanchan Gadkari
- Trupti Kalkar
- Abhilash Bhusari

== Production and marketing ==
The first look poster was unveiled by trade analyst Taran Adarsh. The film was officially announced on 11 October 2023 via teaser. The teaser was released on 11 October 2023. The teaser received mixed response. On 15 October 2023 the 2 minute 3 second trailer was released.

== Release ==
The film was theatrically released on 27 October 2023 all over Maharashtra.

== Reception ==
Akhilesh Nerlekar of Loksatta in negative review called it "A very shallow, simple and misguided film." Nagpur Today wrote "A Disappointing biopic that misses the mark." Film Information wrote "Gadkari is a fairly well made film but it does not have much masala to succeed at the ticket counters."
