= Rajabhau Waje =

Indian politician

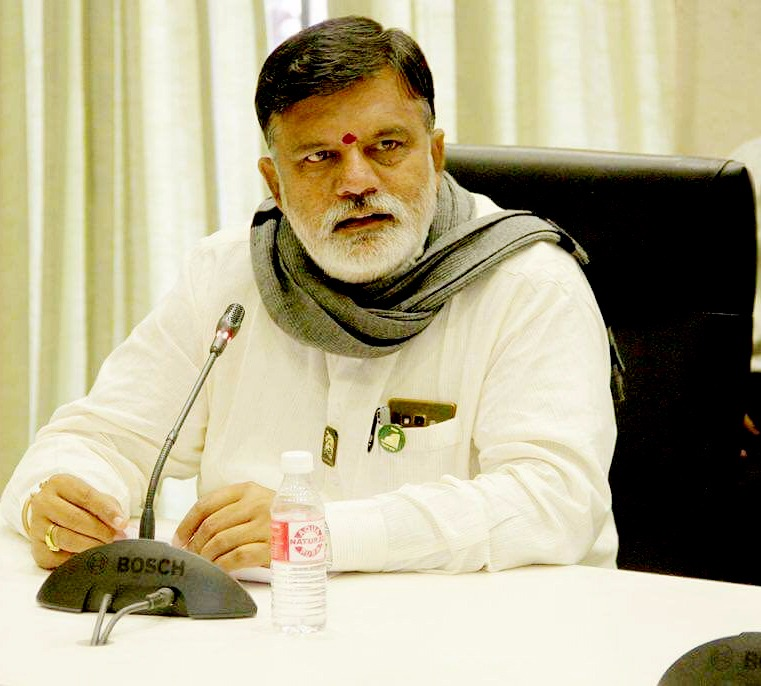

Member of Parliament, Lok Sabha
- Incumbent
- Assumed office 16 June 2024
- Preceded by: Hemant Godse
- Constituency: Nashik

Member of Maharashtra Legislative Assembly
- In office 2014–2019
- Preceded by: Manikrao Kokate
- Succeeded by: Manikrao Kokate
- Constituency: Sinnar

Personal details
- Born: 14 December 1965 (age 60) Deglur, Sinnar Taluka, Nashik District, India
- Party: Shiv Sena (Uddhav Balasaheb Thackeray)
- Occupation: Politician

Rajabhau Waje alias Parag Prakash Waje (born 1965) is an Indian politician, from Sinnar, Nashik district. He is the member of 18th Lok Sabha representing the Shivsena (Uddhav Balasaheb Thackeray) party. He was also a Member of the 13th Maharashtra Legislative Assembly from Sinnar Vidhan Sabha constituency. He belongs to a Maratha (Maratha) political family; his grandfather, Shankar Balaji Waje was a Maharashtra Legislative Assembly member from Sinnar 1965 to 1967. His grandmother, Mathurabai Waje was the first female mayor of Sinnar Nagar Parishad in Bombay State in 1953. She resigned from his post to support the Samyukta Maharashtra Movement and served prison terms. His father, Prakash Waje, also contested 2009 Maharashtra Legislative Assembly election from Sinnar (Vidhan Sabha constituency).

Rajabhau Waje has supported the farmers' cause and has led many agitations. In May 2023, a panel led by Rajabhau Waje successfully took control of the Sinnar APMC from his rival, Manikrao Kokate.

== Positions held ==
- 2014: Elected to Maharashtra Legislative Assembly
- 2014: Elected to Panchayati Raj Samiti, A committee of Maharashtra Legislative Assembly
- 2014: Elected to Grahak Sanrakshak Parishad, A committee of Maharashtra Legislative Assembly
- 2017: Elected to Anusuchit Jamati Kalyan Samiti, A committee of Maharashtra Legislative Assembly
- 2017: Elected to Anusuchit Jamati Kalyan Samiti, A committee of Maharashtra Legislative Assembly
- 2024 : Elected as Member of Parliament from Nashik Lok Sabha Constituency.

== See also ==
- Nashik Lok Sabha constituency
