= Maharashtra Irrigation Scam =

Financial irregularity scandal in India

The Maharashtra Irrigation Scam was an alleged government scam which involved financial irregularities of ₹35,000 crore (US$3.6 billion) in the Indian state of Maharashtra during 1999–2009. The allegations of corruption were made after a 2012 Economic Survey stated that the state's irrigation potential had increased by only 0.1% during the past decade, even after ₹70,000 crore (US$7.3 billion) had been spent on the various projects. Vijay Pandhare, an engineer employed by the government claimed that more than half the amount had been pocketed by corrupt leaders. The Maharashtra Government rejected the allegations, stating that the 0.1% increase considered only "well irrigation" and did not take into account other projects. It released a whitepaper, stating that there was a 28% rise in the irrigation potential, giving a clean chit to its ministers.

== Background ==
The Nationalist Congress Party (NCP) leader Ajit Pawar was the irrigation minister of Maharashtra during 1999–2009. On 25 April 2008, Deputy Secretary TN Munde issued a circular stating that the Irrigation Department was making exorbitant payments for the various raw materials and components, instead of following the scheduled rates fixed by the department. On 14 May 2008, Pawar's office issued a letter asking Munde to repeal the circular, and cautioned him against issuing any circular without the minister's sanction.

During 14–19 December 2009, the Marathi-language newspaper Loksatta carried a series of articles, accusing Pawar of awarding two projects worth ₹1,385 crore to the builder-cum-contractor named Avinash Bhonsle, at an inflated cost. In November 2010, Pawar handed over the Irrigation Department to the fellow NCP leader Sunil Tatkare. He also appointed two inquiry committees, which found several financial irregularities. Pawar went on to become the Deputy Chief Minister in December 2010.

The media continued to highlight the irregularities in the irrigation projects over the next year. In 2012, the State's economic survey mentioned that the irrigation potential had grown by just 0.1% in the past decade, leading to criticism by the Opposition.

== Vijay Pandhare's whistleblowing ==
In February 2012, the Chief Engineer Vijay Pandhare, wrote a letter to the state's Governor, the Chief Minister and the Irrigation Department's principal secretary, complaining about rampant corruption in the department. After he was asked to provide details, he wrote a 15-page letter dated 5 May 2012. In this letter, he alleged that more than half the amount spent on the irrigation projects between 1999 and 2009 had been pocketed by the corrupt politicians and contractors. He highlighted specific instances of corruption including cost escalations, unnecessary additions to the project scope and poor-quality construction. Pandhare accused Ajit Pawar of being directly involved in the scam. He also accused the corrupt leaders of "playing with citizens' lives", saying that the construction quality had been seriously compromised in the dam projects.

The Leader of the Opposition in the Maharashtra Legislative Council and the Bharatiya Janata Party (BJP) councillor Vinod Tawde alleged that 5–7% of the total tender cost was paid in kickbacks to a person named "M" (allegedly Ajit Pawar). The CM's office did not respond to the letter, but the media got hold of the letter in September 2012.

In August 2012, a non-profit organization called Jan Manch petitioned the Nagpur Bench of the Bombay High Court to order an inquiry into the irregularities. The Court then sent a notice to the Government. The petition stated that the cost of 38 irrigation projects under the Vidarbha Irrigation Development Corporation (VIDC) had been escalated from ₹6,672.27 crores to ₹26,722.33 crores within a span of 7 months in 2009.

== Subsequent allegations ==
Amid allegations of corruption, Ajit Pawar resigned on 25 September. In October, Ashish Khetan of Tehelka alleged that Pawar changed the administrative processes to handle the files pertaining to the new projects, overruled the officers who flagged the violations, ensured advance payments to the contractors, overlooked delays and accepted poor-quality work. During a period of 3 months in 2009, Ajit Pawar had approved the cost inflation and escalated the cost of 32 irrigation projects in Vidarbha by ₹17,700 crores.

NCP councillors Sandeep Bajoriya and Satish Chauhan were among the contractors who were awarded the controversial contracts. The Nagpur-based businessman Ajay Sancheti, who later became a BJP Rajya Sabha Member of Parliament (MP), also got irrigation contracts worth more than ₹3,000 crores. The government rules prohibit any company from getting more than three contracts. Sancheti circumvented this rule by getting contracts under two company names: Shakti Kumar M Sancheti Ltd. and SMS Infrastructure Ltd. After he won the contracts, the project costs were escalated through scope addition. Other contractor firms accused of being involved in the irregularities were Pune-based Soma Enterprises (run by Avinash Bhonsale) and the Mumbai-based FA Constructions (run by Fateh Mohammed Khatri and his son Nisar).

An irrigation contractor has revealed how bribes are paid to bag dam contracts. From the lowly clerk to the politician, a percentage of the project cost has to be offered as kickbacks in order to procure the work order. According to him, the total cut amounts to over 22% of the tender cost.

The Pune-based contractor, whose identity is being withheld by this newspaper on his request, wrote a strong letter to the state government and governor recently, highlighting the modus operandi in the scam-tainted department. Last week, the state government gave its nod to the Anti-Corruption Bureau to start an open inquiry against former water resources minister Ajit Pawar and his successor Sunil Tatkare for their alleged role in the multi-crore irrigation scam.

The letter by the contractor alleged that bribes are paid to the tender clerk, the accountant and staff of the respective divisions, the executive engineer, superintending engineer and his staff, chief engineer, executive engineer, executive director, secretary, chairman of the corporation and local MLA.

"All of them are entertained by the bidders, who give them cash fixed by the department unofficially", said the letter. These amounts are paid just to procure the work order. But more money is demanded after the work is awarded. Officials who clear bills of contractors, too want their cut. "Approximate 10% of the billed amount in cash must be paid to the executive officers. Besides, there is what is called an adjustment amount, shared equally between contractors and officers", it said. "This is a routine established procedure. No one feels they are doing anything odd", said the contractor.

The letter said any bidders who tried to challenge this procedure are "dealt strongly" by department officers. Either the contractor is forced to fall in line or leave the scene. "No bidder dares to challenge this system. Everyone wants to go with the flow and make sure they get a piece of the cake", it said.

The letter further said tender notices are not published in the "desired newspapers" (they are published in papers not widely read) as per the government resolution. "At the same time discrepancies are kept in these notices. No details are mentioned for payment of fees, addresses and contact numbers", it said.

A senior department official told TOI: "Projects were awarded at hugely inflated costs. A work costing, say, ₹100, was pegged at ₹500 when tenders were floated. Secondly, the politically-connected contractors carried out sub-standard work as exposed by the Mendigiri Committee report. Thirdly, these contractors did much less work, but charged double the amount from the department." He added, "Professional contractors were virtually driven out after ministers started influencing awarding of contracts. Politicians became partners of small-time contractors, who in turn entered politics." Over the past few months, the state government has tried to revamp the scam-tainted department by posting bureaucrats with a "clean track record". In October, the department scrapped the pre-qualification tender process where the corruption used to start. The pre-qualification guidelines were so manipulated that only a chosen few contractors could make the grade to bid for the multi-crore contracts.

== Government's clean chit to Ajit Pawar ==
Subsequently, in November 2019, the Maharashtra Government released a whitepaper, which gave a clean chit to Ajit Pawar. The paper justified the expenses incurred on the irrigation projects. It stated that there had been a 28% rise in irrigation potential and a 5.17% rise in irrigated land in Maharashtra during the past 10 years. Ajit Pawar was then given the post of Deputy Chief Minister.

== 2014–15 investigation ==
After Bharatiya Janata Party and Shiv Sena formed government in Maharashtra, the state government initiated inquiries into alleged irregularities in 12 irrigation projects.
