= Nitin Gadkari =

Indian politician (born 1957)

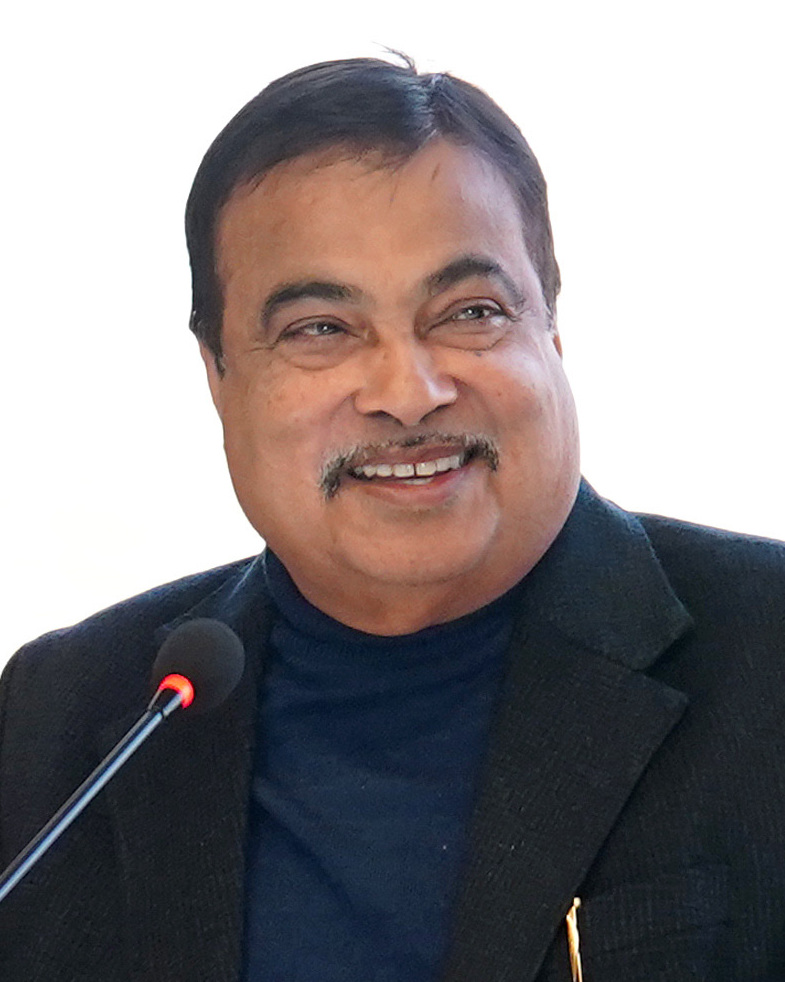
- Gadkari in 2026

Union Minister of Road Transport and Highways
- Incumbent
- Assumed office 26 May 2014
- President: Pranab Mukherjee; Ramnath Kovind; Droupadi Murmu
- Prime Minister: Narendra Modi
- Preceded by: Oscar Fernandes

Union Minister of Micro, Small and Medium Enterprises
- In office 30 May 2019 – 7 July 2021
- President: Ramnath Kovind
- Prime Minister: Narendra Modi
- Preceded by: Giriraj Singh
- Succeeded by: Narayan Rane

Union Minister of Shipping
- In office 26 May 2014 – 30 May 2019
- President: Pranab Mukherjee; Ramnath Kovind
- Prime Minister: Narendra Modi
- Preceded by: G. K. Vasan
- Succeeded by: Mansukh L. Mandaviya

Union Minister of Water Resources, River Development and Ganga Rejuvenation
- In office 3 September 2017 – 30 May 2019
- President: Ramnath Kovind
- Prime Minister: Narendra Modi
- Preceded by: Uma Bharti
- Succeeded by: Gajendra Singh Shekhawat

Union Minister of Rural Development
- In office 4 June 2014 – 9 November 2014
- President: Pranab Mukherjee
- Prime Minister: Narendra Modi
- Preceded by: Gopinath Munde
- Succeeded by: Birender Singh

Union Minister of Panchayati Raj
- In office 4 June 2014 – 9 November 2014
- President: Pranab Mukherjee
- Prime Minister: Narendra Modi
- Preceded by: Gopinath Munde
- Succeeded by: Birender Singh

Union Minister of Drinking Water and Sanitation
- In office 4 June 2014 – 9 November 2014
- President: Pranab Mukherjee
- Prime Minister: Narendra Modi
- Preceded by: Gopinath Munde
- Succeeded by: Birender Singh

Member of Parliament, Lok Sabha
- Incumbent
- Assumed office 16 May 2014
- Preceded by: Vilas Muttemwar
- Constituency: Nagpur, Maharashtra

9th National President of Bharatiya Janata Party
- In office 23 December 2009 – 23 January 2013
- Preceded by: Rajnath Singh
- Succeeded by: Rajnath Singh

President of Bharatiya Janata Party – Maharashtra
- In office 5 April 2005 – 22 December 2009
- Preceded by: Pandurang Fundkar
- Succeeded by: Sudhir Mungantiwar

Leader of the Opposition in Maharashtra Legislative Council
- In office 23 October 1999 – 11 April 2005
- Chief Minister: Vilasrao Deshmukh; Sushilkumar Shinde
- Preceded by: Chhagan Bhujbal
- Succeeded by: Pandurang Fundkar

Minister of Public Works of Maharashtra
- In office 14 March 1995 – 18 October 1999
- Chief Minister: Manohar Joshi; Narayan Rane
- Preceded by: Shivajirao Deshmukh
- Succeeded by: Vijaysinh Mohite–Patil

Member of Maharashtra Legislative Council
- In office 20 July 1990 – 16 May 2014
- Preceded by: Gangadhar Fadnavis
- Succeeded by: Anil Sole
- Constituency: Nagpur Graduates

Personal details
- Born: Nitin Jairam Gadkari; 27 May 1957 (age 69) Nagpur, Bombay State, India (present-day Maharashtra)
- Party: Bharatiya Janata Party
- Spouse: Kanchan Gadkari (m. 1984)
- Children: 3 (2 sons and 1 daughter)
- Education: Master of Commerce; Bachelor of Laws; Doctor of Letters; Nagpur University; Swami Ramanand Teerth Marathwada University
- Occupation: Businessman; politician
- Website: nitingadkari.org.in

Nitin Jairam Gadkari (/nitin ɡʌdkʌˈri/; born 27 May 1957) is an Indian politician who is serving as the 40th Minister of Road Transport & Highways since 2014. He is also the longest serving Minister for Road Transport & Highways, currently in his tenure for over twelve years, and is the only person to serve under a single portfolio for three consecutive terms. A senior leader of the Bharatiya Janata Party (BJP), he served as the President of BJP party from 2009 to 2013.

He currently represents the Nagpur constituency in the Lok Sabha and is a lawyer by profession. He has previously served as a Minister in various departments, including Water resources and River development, Shipping, Rural Development and MSME. During his term as Minister for Public Works, he undertook large-scale infrastructure projects. He is recognized for being pioneer of PPP in the road sector in India. His major contributions include initiation of the Mumbai-Pune Expressway and other developments of expressway and road infrastructure. He infamously fast-tracked the E100 fuel.

== Early life ==
Gadkari was born into a Marathi Brahmin family in Nagpur, India to Jairam Gadkari and Bhanutai Gadkari on 27 May 1957. During his adolescence, he worked for the Bharatiya Janata Yuva Morcha and the student union Akhil Bharatiya Vidyarthi Parishad. He completed M.Com. and LL.B. from Nagpur University.

== Political career ==
Gadkari served as the Minister of Public Works Department (PWD) of the Government of Maharashtra from 1995 to 1999 and restructured it from top to bottom. He has served as the president of the Maharashtra state unit of BJP.

Gadkari strongly supported privatisation while he campaigned for investments in infrastructure from private firms. He addressed several meetings between private investors, contractors, builders and various trade organisations and diverted large amounts of budgeted projects towards privatisation. Subsequently, the state government allocated ₹7 billion for rural connectivity. Over the next four years, all-weather road connectivity in Maharashtra was extended to 98% of the population. The project aimed to connect 13,736 remote villages which remained unconnected since independence by road. It also helped ameliorate malnutrition in remote Melghat-Dharni area of Amravati district, which previously had no access to medical aid, ration or educational facilities.

Gadkari was the architect of Pradhan Mantri Gram Sadak Yojana. He received the Late Madhavrao Limaye Award by Public Library Nashik, for Most Efficient Member of Parliament for 2020–21.

=== Positions served ===
- Minister, Govt of Maharashtra
- Chairman, Purti Group of Companies
- President, Bharatiya Janata Party, Maharashtra State
- Leader of Opposition, Maharashtra Legislative Council
- Former Minister for Public Works Department, Maharashtra State
- Member of Legislative Council, Maharashtra State
- Elected to the Maharashtra Govt. Legislative Council in 1989 from graduates constituency, Nagpur Region
- Re-elected in 1990
- Re-elected in 1996 and elected unopposed in 2002
- Inducted in the Maharashtra State Government Cabinet as the Minister for Public Works on 27 May 1995
- Member of the High Powered Committee for Privatisation, Government of Maharashtra
- Chairman, Maharashtra State Road Development Corporation, India
- Guardian Minister for Nagpur District, Govt. of Maharashtra
- Chairman, Mining policy Implementation Committee, Govt. of Maharashtra
- Chairman, Metropolis Beautification Committee, Govt. of Maharashtra
- Leader of Opposition, Maharashtra Legislative Council, Chairman National Rural Road Development Committee
- Chairman, Review Committee of PWD at Govt. of India
- State President of Bharatiya Janata Party, Maharashtra
- National President of BJP, India

=== As Public Works Department (PWD) Minister, Maharashtra, 1996–99 ===
As PWD Minister of Maharashtra, Gadkari played a crucial role in expediting the construction of the Mumbai-Pune Expressway. In 1990, the Government of Maharashtra conducted feasibility studies for the new expressway to be operated on a toll basis, however, it was only after Gadkari took over as PWD Minister that the construction of this project was fast-tracked. Gadkari entrusted the work of the construction of Mumbai-Pune expressway to MSRDC in March 1997 on Build-Operate-Transfer basis with permission to collect toll for 30 years. The tender notice was published in leading newspapers all over India and also on the Internet. Due to the wide publicity, 133 tenders were sold and on 18 December 1997, 55 tenders were received. After technical and financial evaluation, tenders were accepted and work orders were given on 1 January 1998 to four contractors. Thereafter tenders for widening of the Khandala and Lonavala-Khandala bypass works were invited. The tenders were received on 24 August 1998 and orders were issued on 4 September 1998. The first sections of the Expressway opened in 2000, and the entire route was completed, opened to traffic and made fully operational from April 2002.

The other major achievement of Gadkari as state minister was the construction of 55 flyovers in Mumbai, which eased the city traffic problems significantly.

=== As President of BJP, 2009–2013 ===
Gadkari was appointed the president of the BJP in December 2009. This was considering a tough phase for the BJP as the party had lost two successive Lok Sabha elections and needed a quick revamp.

In his book India Aspires, co-authored with Tuhin Sinha, Gadkari spells out his development ideas for the country in great detail. Increased institutional support to green energy, alternate fuel and effective waste management hold special importance in Gadkari's development plan.

As BJP party president, Gadkari, re-emphasised on legendary Jan Sangh leader Deen Dayal Upadhya's principles of Integral Humanism and Antyodaya (upliftment of the poor). At the same time, various cells were constituted within the party to regularly monitor the develop work undertaken by various BJP state governments and to come up with new policy inputs.

Gadkari resigned as party president in January 2013.

=== 2014 and 2019 Lok Sabha elections ===
Gadkari contested 2014 Lok Sabha election successfully from Nagpur constituency and won. He defeated Congress party candidate Vilas Muttemwar by margin of 285,000. He retained his seat in 2019, defeating Nana Patole of Congress party by 216,000 margin.

=== Union Minister ===
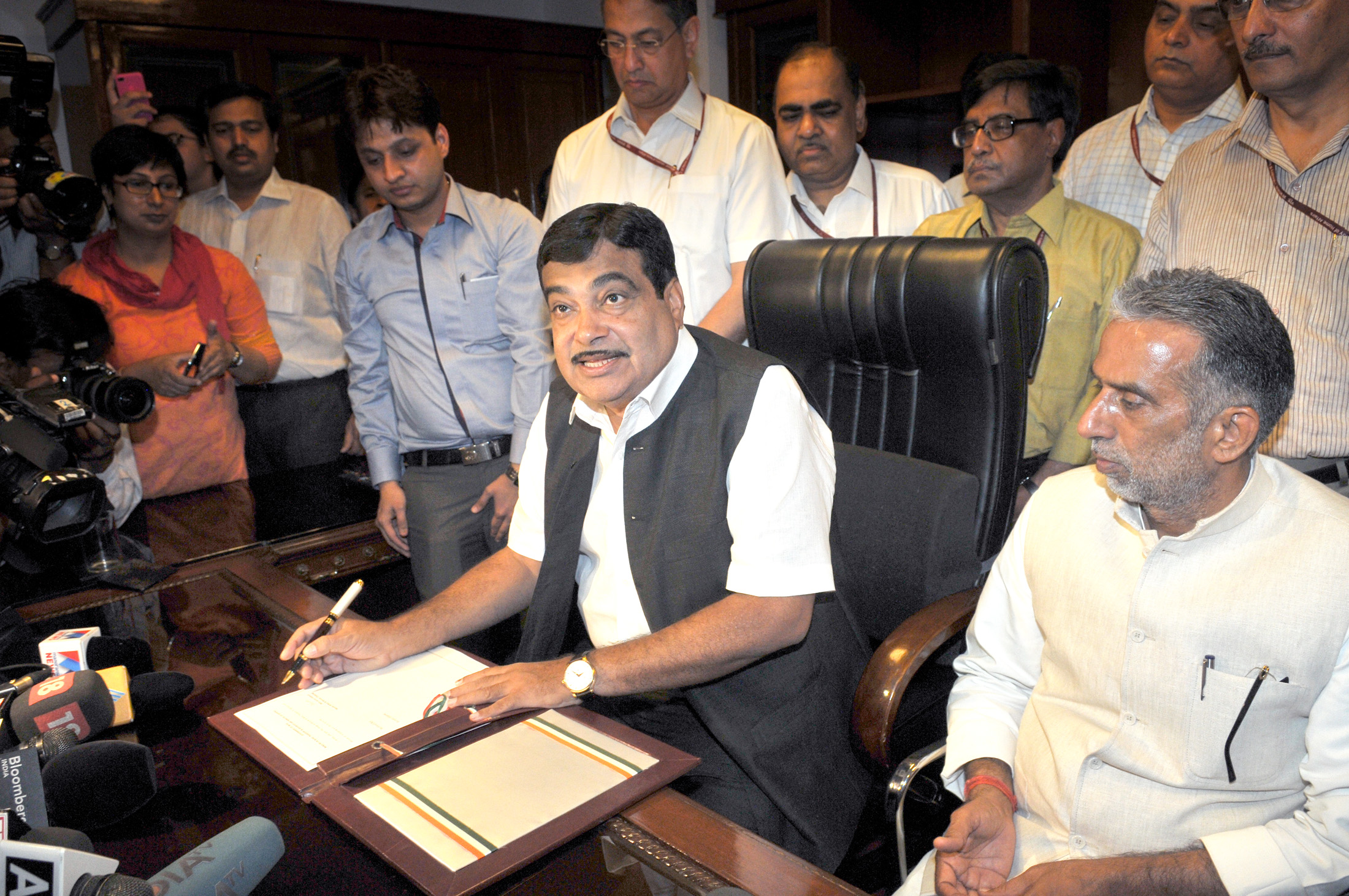
Gadkari taking charge as the Union Minister for Road Transport and Highways and Shipping, in New Delhi on 29 May 2014.

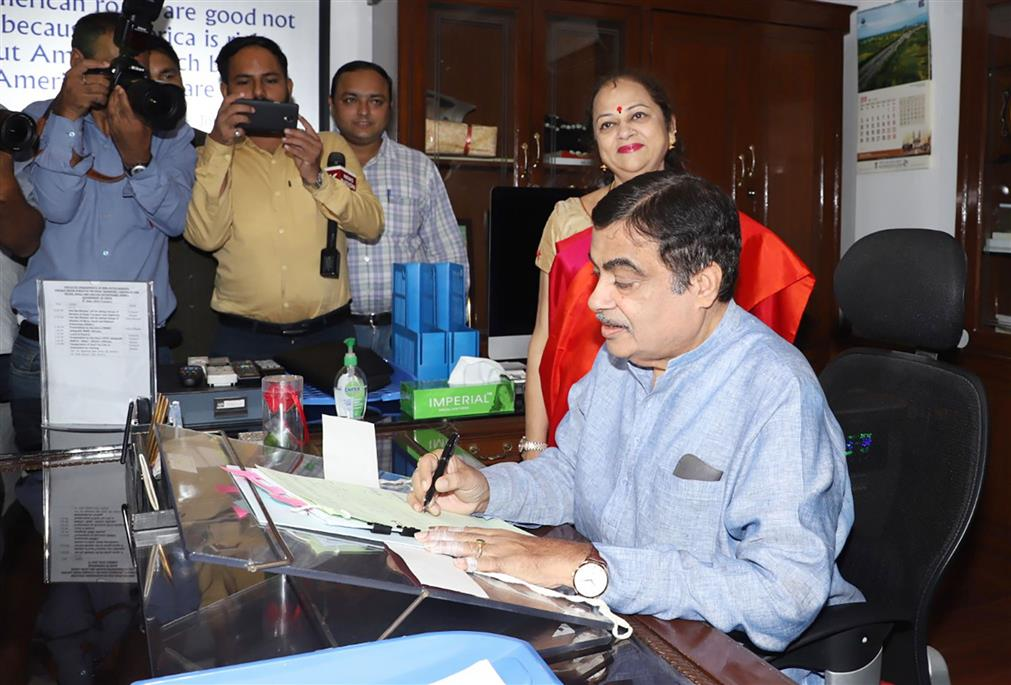
Gadkari taking charge as the Union Minister for Road Transport and Highways, in New Delhi on 4 June 2019.

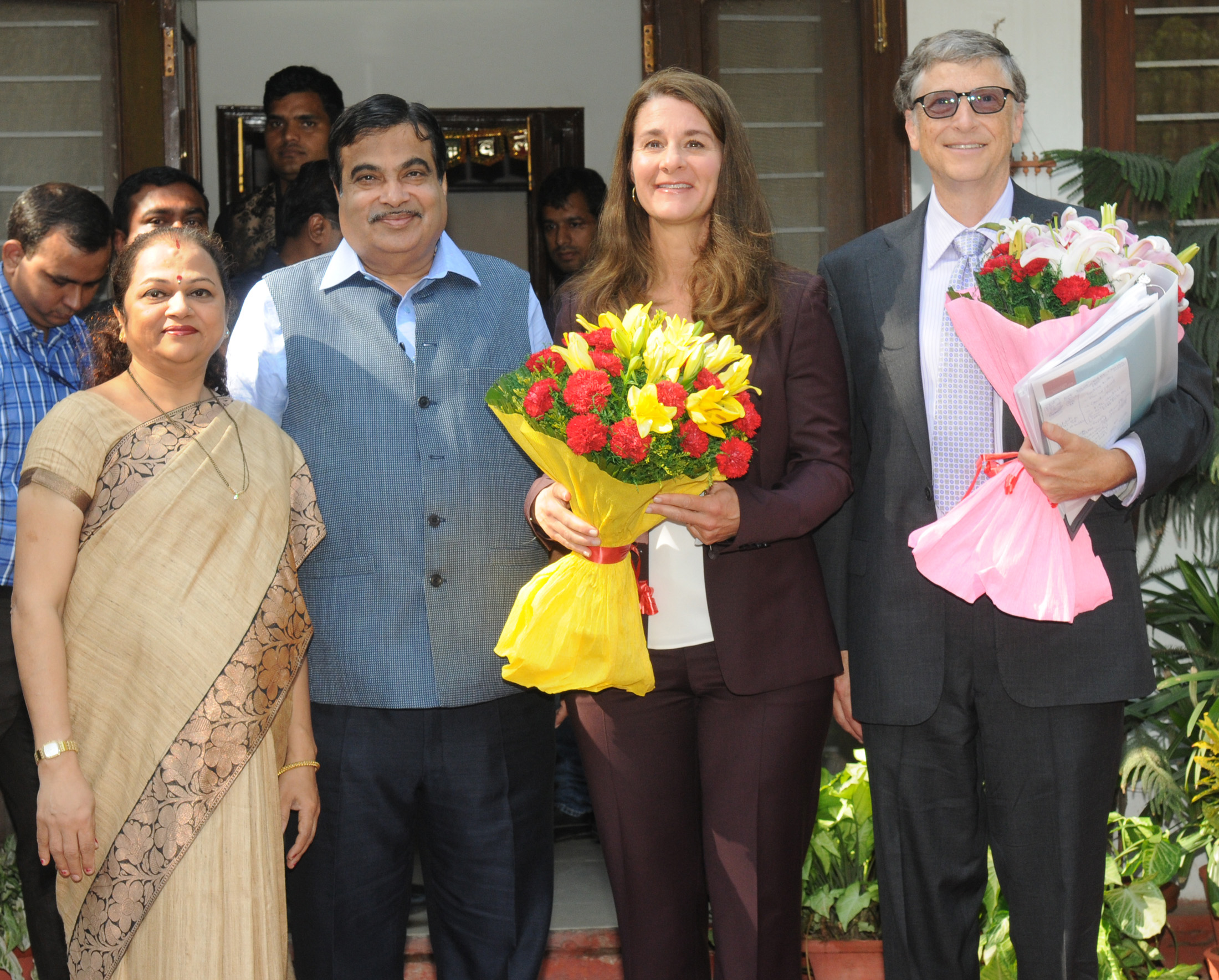
Bill Gates and Melinda Gates, Co-Chairs of the Bill & Melinda Gates Foundation calls on the Union Minister for Road Transport & Highways and Shipping, Nitin Gadkari and his wife Kanchan Gadkari, in New Delhi on 19 September 2014.

Gadkari became the Minister of Road Transport and Highways and Minister of Shipping in May 2014. Out of the stalled projects he inherited, projects worth ₹1 trillion (US$11 billion) were terminated and others worth ₹350 billion (US$3.7 billion) were put up for rebidding. He increased the pace of road creation in the country from 2 km/day to 16.5 km/day in his first year and to 21 km/day in the second year and end of 2018 30 km/day. He reserved an amount of one per cent of the total projects awarded in his tenure worth ₹2 trillion (US$21 billion) for trees and beautification.

During the Second Modi ministry, Gadkari retained Ministry of Road Transport and Highways, while the Ministry of Shipping and Ministry of Water Resources, River Development and Ganga Rejuvenation were replaced with Ministry of Micro, Small and Medium Enterprises on 31 May 2019. Highway construction pace post 2019 was 36 km per day in 2020 and Gadkari aims to take it to 68 km per day with a target of 25000 km in 2022–23. In line with the vision of Atmanirbhar Bharat green fuel adoption and fuel self sufficiency Gadkari drove to the parliament in a hydrogen powered FCEV Toyota Mirai car. He asked people to opt for green fuel vehicles.

Gadkari, who was virtually present at the inauguration of the headquarters of the National Highways Authority of India (NHAI) on 28 October 2020, made a speech that was highly critical of the NHAI officials and bureaucracy.

Gadkari has been the subject of discussion for several initiatives by both BJP and Congress leaders as well as critics, most notably for increasing blend of ethanol in gasoline, encouraging mixing plastic in asphalt-bitumen roads, as well as launching the Bharat NCAP. The Bharat NCAP has been launched on the lines of Global NCAP, which is based on Latin NCAP 2016. Due to absence of safety features in cars made for India, which was noted following the crash testing of a few models in 2014, Gadkari mandated safety features such as ABS and 6 airbags(earlier 2 airbags) for cars sold across India. While he received praise for trying to make roads and cars safer, some automakers criticised this decision, stating that adding safety features will drive up prices of vehicles and make them unaffordable.

Under his tenure as Minister of Road Transport & Highways, India's National Highway (NH) network has grown by 60% becoming world's second largest network, rising from 91,287 km in 2014 to 146,195 km in 2024. The length of National High-Speed Corridors (HSC) has increased by 2560%, rising from 93 km in 2014 to 2,474 km in 2024 and the length of 4-lane and above National Highways (excluding HSCs) has more than doubled, expanding from 18,278 km in 2014 to 45,947 km in 2024.

=== Khasdar Sanskrutik Mahotsav ===
Gadkari, organises Khasdar Sanskrutik Mahotsav every year in Nagpur. The event focuses on India's diverse cultural heritage, encompassing traditional arts, music, dance, and literature. The Program Involves Various Bollywood celebrtities, singers and performers including Hema Malini, Mika Singh, Amit Trivedi and Adnan Sami.

=== 2024 general election ===
In March 2024, he was announced as the BJP candidate from his home constituency Nagpur in the 2024 General Elections. He secured a decisive victory for the third consecutive time, defeating his closest Congress rival by a margin of 137,603 votes.

== Industrial career ==
During his career in politics, Gadkari set up a number of private industries and companies. These include –

- Poly sack Industrial Society Ltd – founder and chairman
- Nikhil Furniture and Appliances Pvt. Ltd – promoter and director
- Antyodaya Trust – founder and member
- Empress Employees Co-operative Paper Mills Ltd – founder and chairman
- Purti Power and Sugar Ltd / Purti Sakhar Karkhana Ltd – promoter

Gadkari has registered himself as an agriculturist for tax purposes. He also started a fruit export company under the banner of "Ketaki Overseas Trading Company". He owns a total of 17 sugar plantations in Vidarbha under the banner of the Purti group. Gadkari floated the Purti Power and Sugar Ltd (now Purti Group) in 1995, when he started as PWD minister in Maharashtra. In 2012, the companies came into the media glare based on irregularities unearthed by RTI activist Anjali Damania, the Income Tax department investigated a number of firms that had invested in Purti, and found more than a dozen of these to be bogus addresses. Another three investing firms were found co-located with the Somani Group, but no one knew of these firms. Following this, Delhi CM Arvind Kejriwal amplified the allegations accusing Gadkari of irregularities. However, Kejriwal apologised unconditionally after Gadkari filed a defamation case against him.

In 2010, when the Purti group had incurred losses of Rs. 640 million, the firm IRB, which had obtained hefty road contracts under Gadkari's term as PWD minister, loaned the group Rs. 1.64 billion, which was higher than Purthi's turnover of Rs. 1.45 billion. When questioned on Marathi channel IBN-Lokmat, about why he did not avail a loan from banks, Gadkari explained that the balance sheets of the company were not in a suitable state, so he had requested his friend Dattatray to help him out. Also, Gadkari's son Nikhil was allegedly a director with IRB at the time. Gadkari argued that there was nothing wrong in having contractors invest in one's firms, but opposition leaders have argued that all this suggests a quid pro quo for political favours granted by Gadkari.

The news of these allegations broke a few months before Gadkari was to seek re-election as president of the BJP. At the time, Gadkari was to address several rallies for the 2012 Himachal Pradesh Legislative Assembly election. India Today reported that BJP leader Shanta Kumar had suggested that Gadkari's presence was "affecting BJP's anti-corruption campaign." Subsequently, Gadkari cancelled his scheduled rallies at Bilaspur and Solan on 30 October.

In early 2013, in the elections for BJP president, for which Gadkari was "close to clinching a second innings" his chances unravelled with several senior leaders suggesting that the I-T indictment of the Purti groups investments had damaged his image, and Gadkari was not re-elected. Gadkari told the Times of India that he was stepping down until the inquiry proved him innocent. Some RSS functionaries have suggested that his exit was the result of infighting. Subsequently, Gadkari threatened the I-T officers, saying "when our party comes to power, there would be no Chidambaram or Sonia to save them (I-T officials)"; Gadkari said,"Earlier CBI was doing Congress's bidding and now the I-T people are following suit." The I-T officers association took umbrage at these remarks and demanded an apology.

Eventually, in May 2013, the Income Tax department assessed that Gadkari's firms had evaded Rs. 70 million via such benami investments and other practices. On 30 April 2014, then Congress union Minister Manish Tewari apologised to Gadkari when he was dragged in to a defamation suit by the latter. This apology was based on the judicial commission mention that Gadkari had played no role or had no concern with the scam. On 13 May 2014, the Income Tax department of Maharashtra state cleared Gadkari's name and gave him a clean chit saying there is no investigation presently pending. GPS based toll collection will start on National Highways, said Nitin Gadkari.

== Publications ==
Gadkari authored Unmasking India: Webinars for Atmanirbhar Bharat (2021), edited by Sarita Kaushik and Rahul Pande. The book compiles his addresses delivered during the COVID-19 pandemic through a series of webinars on economic self-reliance (Atmanirbhar Bharat). The discussions cover sectors including MSMEs, agriculture, infrastructure, transport, energy and innovation.

== Personal life ==
Nitin Gadkari is married to Kanchan Gadkari and they have three children, Nikhil, Sarang and Ketki. His eldest son Nikhil is married to Rutuja Pathak and Sarang Gadkari is married to Madhura Rodi. Gadkari and his family follow a vegetarian diet.

== Controversies ==
In August 2019, Gadkari created controversy when he stated that he had advised the then Union Finance Minister to sack the RBI Governor because the latter was "inflexible and adamant".

In 2009, seven-year-old Yogita Thakre was found dead with bruises all over her body in a car allegedly owned by Gadkari and parked near his home in Nagpur. Maharashtra's Criminal Investigation Department (CID) attempted to close the case twice, but local courts rejected the closure reports. Gadkari's employees claimed that the girl had accidentally locked herself in the boot of the car and died of suffocation, while her mother alleged that she had been murdered. The post-mortem report indicated that Yogita was smothered to death. According to a release on 21 May 2009 by senior police inspector R. S. Katole, blood stains were found on the child's undergarments, as well as on her private parts. Her mouth was reportedly found open and her lips turned black. A vaginal swab was sent to a regional forensic laboratory to determine if she had been sexually assaulted.

In 2025, Gadkari faced criticism over the nationwide rollout of petrol blended with 20% ethanol (E20). Critics alleged that the move reduced fuel efficiency, caused potential damage to older vehicles, and primarily benefited ethanol-producing companies linked to his family, such as Cian Agro Industries & Infrastructure Ltd and Manas Agro Industries, in which his sons reportedly held stakes. Congress alleged a conflict of interest, claiming that the ethanol policy disproportionately aided such companies whose revenues surged after the policy change. Gadkari denied any wrongdoing, stating that he had "no role" in issuing contracts for ethanol production and that his family's firms accounted for less than 0.5% of national output. He also alleged that much of the criticism of the E20 policy was part of a "paid political campaign" to discredit him. The Supreme Court of India dismissed a petition that sought to halt the rollout of E20, thereby upholding the government's blending policy. Media reports also noted that several social media influencers were engaged in paid promotional campaigns to support ethanol blending and the E20 fuel policy. Gadkari following the footsteps of Brazil, wishes to increase ethanol percentage in petrol to 35%.

In March 2025, Caravan magazine published an article "Nagpur's Beef": The beef company enmeshed in Gadkari's business empire" alleging links between Gadkari's business network and a beef company. CIAN Agro Industries & Infrastructure Ltd, being run by Nikhil Gadkari, vehemently denied this. It has denied any involvement in meat processing or exports, emphasising its focus on agro-based commodities and lack of licences for bovine meat products. It has called the report false, incendiary, and damaging to its reputation. The company has sent notice to Caravan, demanding the removal of its article. Within weeks, the claims spread across digital platforms and social media. Nitin Gadkari has filed a ₹50 crore defamation suit against YouTuber Mukesh Mohan for his video based on The Caravan report, leading to an FIR, phone seizures, and police summons against Mohan. Mohan alleges similar FIRs have been filed against other content creators in Aurangabad, Gujarat, and Delhi for related videos, prompting online debate about whether secondary speakers are being unfairly targeted.

== In popular culture ==
On 27 October 2023, a Marathi language biopic titled Gadkari was released in Maharashtra.

== See also ==
- Make in India
- Highways in India
- Ports in India

Lok Sabha
Preceded by Vilas Muttemwar	Member of Parliament for Nagpur; 2014–present	Succeeded by Incumbent
Political offices
Preceded by Oscar Fernandes	Minister of Road Transport and Highways; 26 May 2014–present	Succeeded by Incumbent
Preceded by G. K. Vasan	Minister of Shipping; 26 May 2014 – 26 May 2019	Succeeded by Mansukh L. Mandaviya; Minister of State (Independent Charge)
Preceded by Gopinath Munde	Minister of Rural Development; 4 June 2014 – 9 November 2014	Succeeded by Chaudhary Birender Singh
Preceded by Gopinath Munde	Minister of Panchayati Raj; 4 June 2014 – 9 November 2014	Succeeded by Chaudhary Birender Singh
Preceded by Gopinath Munde	Minister of Drinking Water and Sanitation; 4 June 2014 – 9 November 2014	Succeeded by Chaudhary Birender Singh
Preceded by Uma Bharti	Minister of Water Resources, River Development & Ganga Rejuvenation; 3 September 2017 – 26 May 2019	Succeeded by Ministry renamed as Jal Shakti; Gajendra Singh Shekhawat
Preceded by Giriraj Singh; Minister of State (Independent Charge)	Minister of Micro, Small and Medium Enterprises; 30 May 2019 – 7 July 2021	Succeeded by Narayan Rane
