= Tuhin Sinha =

Indian novelist, journalist and BJP spokesperson

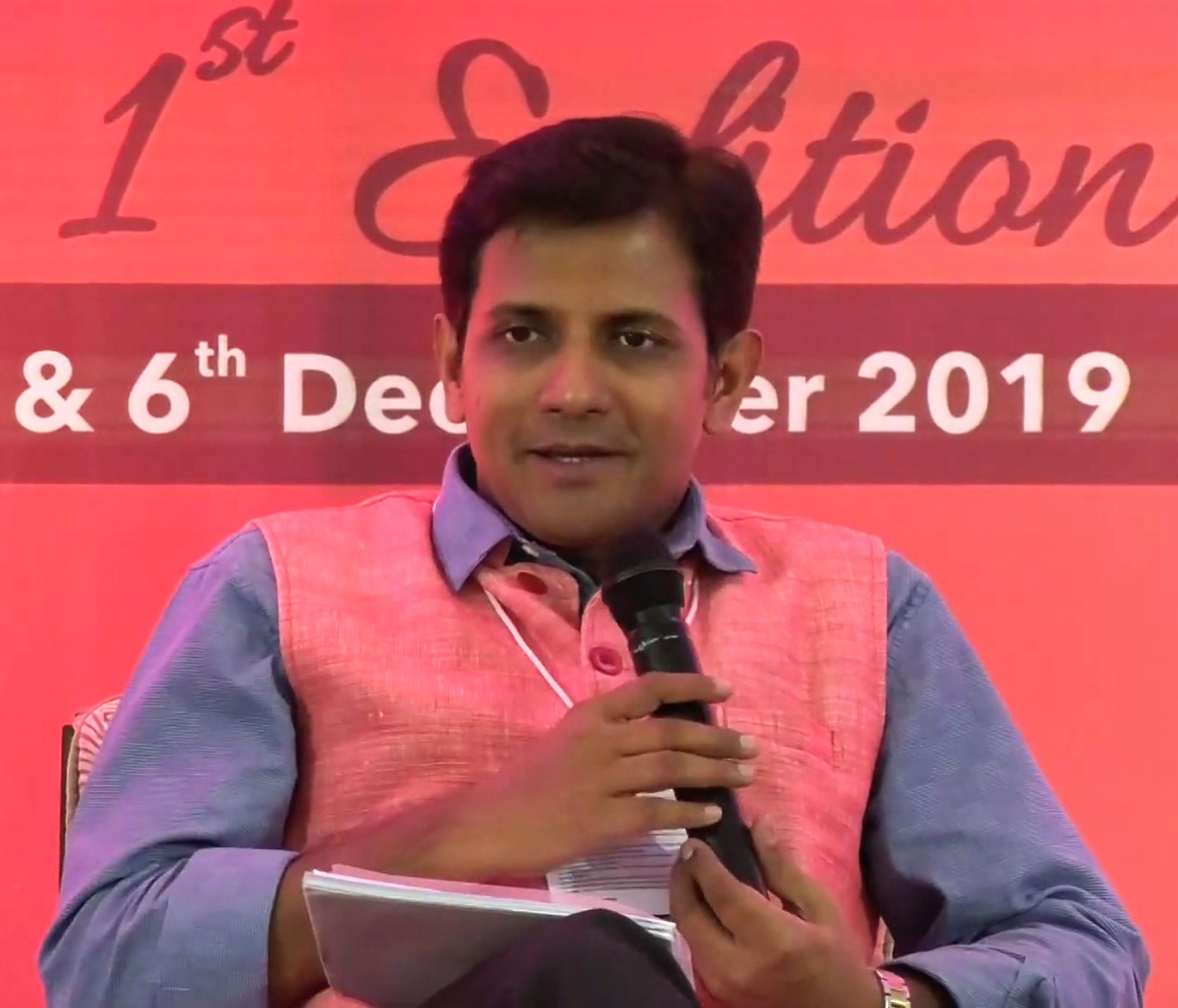
- Tuhin Sinha in 2019
- Born: Tuhin Amar Sinha; Jamshedpur, Jharkhand
- Citizenship: India
- Education: Hindu College, Delhi; Delhi University
- Occupation: Writer
- Writing career
- Language: English, Hindi
- Genres: Political thrillers, romance, historical novels, non-fiction
- Notable works: Of Love and Politics; The Edge of Desire; Daddy; The Legend of Birsa Munda; The Great Tribal Warriors of Bharat

Tuhin Amar Sinha is an Indian author of political thrillers, romance novels and non-fiction works. Since 2016, he has been a spokesperson for the Bharatiya Janata Party (BJP).

== Life ==
Sinha was born and brought up in Jamshedpur, Jharkhand. He completed his schooling at Loyola School and is a commerce graduate from Hindu College, University of Delhi. Sinha worked for a year in TV ad sales. He moved to Mumbai to find work in the entertainment industry. Having tried unsuccessfully to become an actor, he took a scriptwriting course and began writing for TV; then turned to books, debuting with That Thing Called Love in 2007. This was followed by 22 yards in 2008 and Of Love and Politics in 2010. Sinha proceeded to write political thrillers and romance novels as well as Daddy, a non-fiction book on parenting (2015), and two books on politics, one with former BJP president Nitin Gadkari. In 2021, he published the historical novel The Legend of Birsa Munda (2021), a dramatized account of the life of 19th-century religious leader and tribal revolutionary Birsa Munda, co-written with Ankita Verma, followed in 2022 by the non-fiction book The Great Tribal Warriors of Bharat, co-authored with Ambalika.

On 31 January 2014, Sinha joined the Bharatiya Janata Party (BJP); in December 2016, he was appointed spokesperson for Mumbai region. Sinha was subsequently included in the national media team of BJP. In 2016–2017, Sinha was on the Steering Committee of the national #HaveaSafeJourney (#HASJ) awareness campaign, a road safety initiative by the Ministry of Road Transport and Highways. In 2017, Sinha filed a plea against Rahul Gandhi, then vice-president of the Congress Party, in the Delhi High Court, alleging that Gandhi had violated the Special Protection Group Act by giving his security detail the slip; the court refused to rule on the matter, saying security was a matter for the government.

In 2022 Sinha sued the Wikimedia Foundation following the deletion of the Wikipedia page about him. The article was recreated by an editor, but as of 2024 the court case is ongoing regarding compensation.

== Reception ==
Reviewing for The Hindu, Reshmi Kulkarni found Of Love and Politics to be a "more head-spinning than heady" political thriller with occasional splashes of romance. Reviewing The Edge of Desire, Kulkarni found the work to be a one-time-read that suffered from the intense cramming of a multitude of political affairs. Sayoni Aiyar for News18.com deplored how Sinha's female lead character defined herself entirely by relationships with men in her life. Reviewing for The Deccan Chronicle, Omkar Sane panned Let The Reason be Love as an epitome of mediocrity and predictability. Sinha's non-fiction book on childcare, Daddy (2015), was described in The New Indian Express as written for "new-generation fathers."

== Bibliography ==
=== Fiction ===
- That Thing Called Love.
- 22 Yards; republished as The Captain.
- Of Love and Politics.
- The Edge of Desire.
- The Edge of Power.
- Let the Reason Be Love.
- When the Chief Fell in Love.
- Mission Shengzhan – India Fights The Dragon (co-authored with Clark Prasad).
- The Legend of Birsa Munda (co-authored with Ankita Verma).

=== Non-fiction ===
- India Aspires: Redefining Politics of Development (co-authored with former BJP president Nitin Gadkari).
- Daddy.
- India Inspires: Redefining the Politics of Deliverance.
- The Great Tribal Warriors of Bharat (co-authored with Ambalika).
