= Pratap Wagh =

Indian politician

Member of Parliament, Lok Sabha
- In office 1980-1984
- Preceded by: Vithalrao Hande
- Succeeded by: Muralidhar Mane
- Constituency: Nashik, Maharashtra

Personal details
- Born: 20 December 1938 (age 87) Nasik, Bombay Presidency, British India
- Party: Indian National Congress
- Spouse: Sujata Wagh
- Children: One daughter

Pratap Wagh is an Indian politician. He was elected to the Lok Sabha, the lower house of the Parliament of India as a member of the Indian National Congress.
