= Manikrao Kokate =

Indian politician

Manikrao Shivajirao Kokate
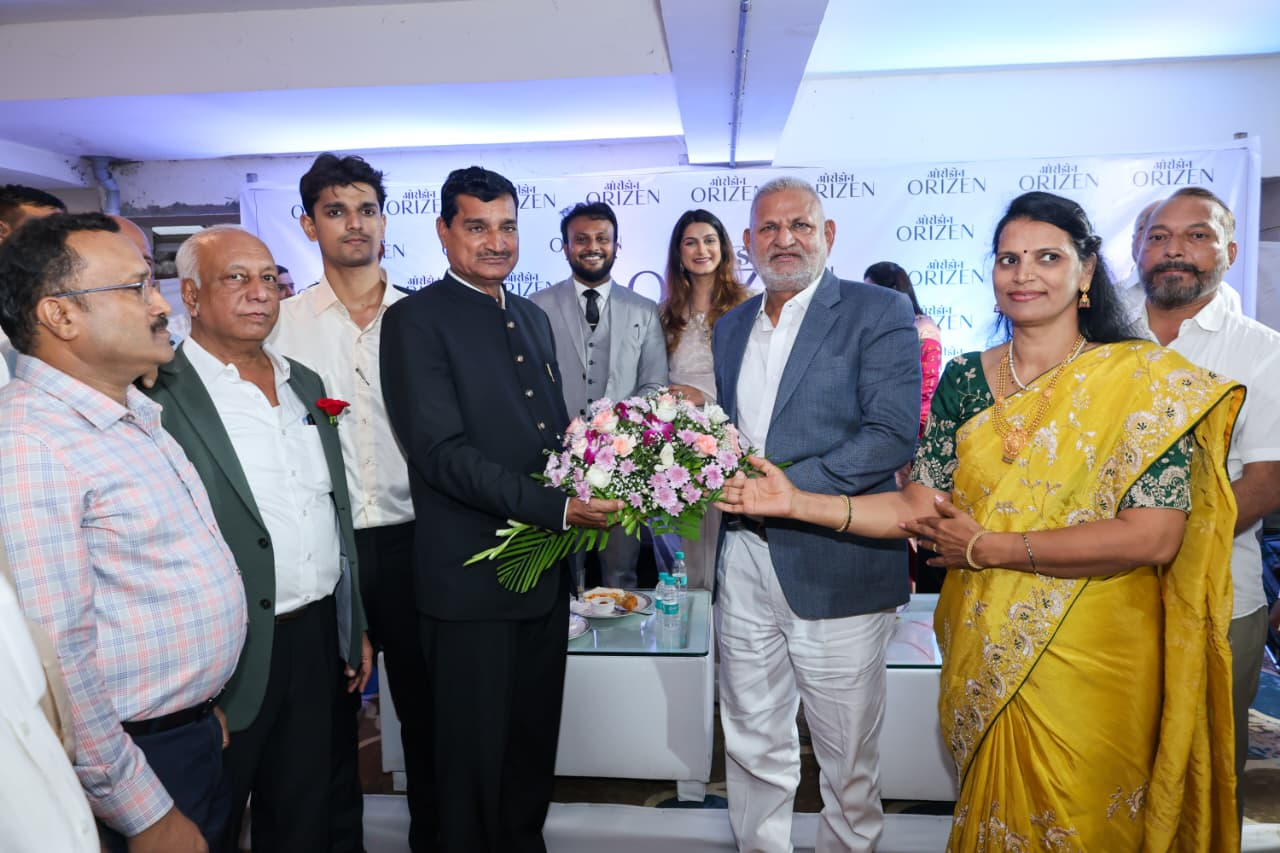
- Kokate (on the right) at the inauguration of Orizen Dental Clinic

Cabinet Minister Government of Maharashtra
- In office 31 July 2025 – 18 December 2025
- Minister: Sports and Youth Welfare; Minority Development and Aukaf
- Cabinet: Third Fadnavis ministry
- Chief Minister: Devendra Fadnavis
- Deputy CM: Eknath Shinde; Ajit Pawar
- Preceded by: Dattatray Vithoba Bharne
- Succeeded by: Ajit Pawar

Cabinet Minister Government of Maharashtra
- In office 15 December 2024 – 31 July 2025
- Minister: Agriculture
- Governor: C. P. Radhakrishnan
- Cabinet: Third Fadnavis ministry
- Chief Minister: Devendra Fadnavis
- Deputy CM: Eknath Shinde; Ajit Pawar
- Guardian Minister: Akola
- Preceded by: Dhananjay Munde
- Succeeded by: Dattatray Vithoba Bharne

Member of the Maharashtra Legislative Assembly
- Incumbent
- Assumed office (2019-2024), (2024-Present)
- Preceded by: Rajabhau Waje
- Constituency: Sinner
- In office (1999-2004), (2004-2009), (2009 – 2014)
- Preceded by: Tukaram Dighole
- Succeeded by: Rajabhau Waje
- Constituency: Sinner

Personal details
- Born: 26 September 1957 (age 69) Nashik, Bombay State, India
- Party: Nationalist Congress Party (2019-Present), (1999-1999)
- Other political affiliations: Bharatiya Janata Party (2014-2019) Indian National Congress (2009-2014), (Before 1999) Shiv Sena (1999-2009)
- Education: B.Sc, LLB From University of Pune

Manikrao Kokate is a politician from Nashik District of Maharashtra State. He is currently MLA of Sinnar Assembly Constituency on NCP Ticket. He has won from Sinnar assembly constituency 5 times.

He has unsuccessfully contested as Independent candidate for 2019 Lok Sabha Elections from Nashik Lok Sabha Constituency.

== Political career ==
He started his political journey with Indian National Congress (INC) at young age. He left the Congress and joined the Nationalist Congress Party (NCP), which was founded by Sharad Pawar in 1999. After NCP denied him ticket for Sinnar Assembly Constituency, he switched to Shivsena and won the seat in 1999 and 2004 Maharashtra Assembly elections. Later he joined the rebellion of then Shivsena leader Narayan Rane and joined Congress along with Rane. He won from Sinnar for third time in 2009 assembly election on Congress ticket. He again switched to BJP for 2014 assembly election and was defeated by Shivsena candidate Rajabhau Waje. In 2019 Loksabha Elections, he fought as independent candidate from Nashik Lok Sabha seat, he was defeated by Shivsena candidate. He once again switched to NCP for 2019 assembly elections, he won the Sinnar assembly seat for 4th time by very thin margin. In the 2024 assembly elections, he won by a huge margin against the NCP Sharad Pawar's candidate, Uday Sangale.
