= Balasaheb Mahadu Sanap =

Indian politician

Maharashtra Legislative Assembly
- In office 2014–2019
- Preceded by: Uttamrao Dhikale
- Succeeded by: Rahul Dhikale
- Constituency: Nashik East

Personal details
- Born: 30 June
- Party: Bharatiya Janata Party
- Other political affiliations: Nationalist Congress Party; Shivsena
- Occupation: Politician

Balasaheb Mahadu Sanap is an Indian politician and member of the Bharatiya Janata Party. He is a first term member of the Maharashtra Legislative Assembly. He is BJP's 1st Mayor and 1st Vice-Mayor Nashik Municipal Corporation. He was the city president of Bhartiya Janta Party till 22 August 2019. He is also President- Committee of Anusuchit Jati and Jamati of Maharashtra Government and Vice-President Committee of Mayors of Maharashtra Municipal Corporation.

He was rejected ticket in 2019 elections by BJP and he contested as NCP candidate and lost from Nashik East. After the election results he joined Shiv Sena.

In the 2019 assembly elections, he lost against Bharatiya Janata Party candidate Adv. Rahul Dhikle.

== Constituency ==
Balasaheb Mahadu Sanap was elected from the Nashik-East assembly constituency, Maharashtra.

== Positions held ==
- Maharashtra Legislative Assembly MLA.
- Terms in office: 2014-2019.
