= Hiraman Khoskar =

Indian politician

Hiraman Bhikaji Khoskar
- हिरामण भिकाभाई खोस्कर

Member of the Maharashtra Legislative Assembly
- Incumbent
- Assumed office 24 October 2019
- Preceded by: Nirmala Gavit
- Constituency: Igatpuri

Personal details
- Party: Nationalist Congress Party; Indian National Congress (until 2024)
- Parent: Bhikaji Gopala Khoskar
- Profession: Politician, Farmer

Hiraman Bhikabhai Khoskar is an Indian politician. He was elected as a Member of the Maharashtra Legislative Assembly for Igatpuri constituency during the 2019 Maharashtra Legislative Assembly election.

Ahead of the 2024 Maharashtra Legislative Assembly election, he left the Indian National Congress and joined the Nationalist Congress Party. He was later declared as the Nationalist Congress Party candidate from the Igatpuri Assembly constituency.

== Early life ==
Hiraman Khoskar was born in a Agriculturist Koli family of Igatpuri in Maharashtra to Bhikaji Gopala Khoskar on 11 August 1965.

== Political career ==
- 2019 - ongoing: Member of Legislative assembly from Igatpuri Assembly constituency
