= Nashik Lok Sabha constituency =

Lok Sabha constituency in Maharashtra

Coordinates: 20.0°N 73.8°E

Nashik Lok Sabha
- Lok Sabha constituency
- Nashik Lok Sabha Constituency map

Constituency details
- Country: India
- Region: Western India
- State: Maharashtra
- Assembly constituencies: Sinnar; Nashik East; Nashik Central; Nashik West; Deolali; Igatpuri
- Established: 1952
- Reservation: None

Member of Parliament
- 18th Lok Sabha
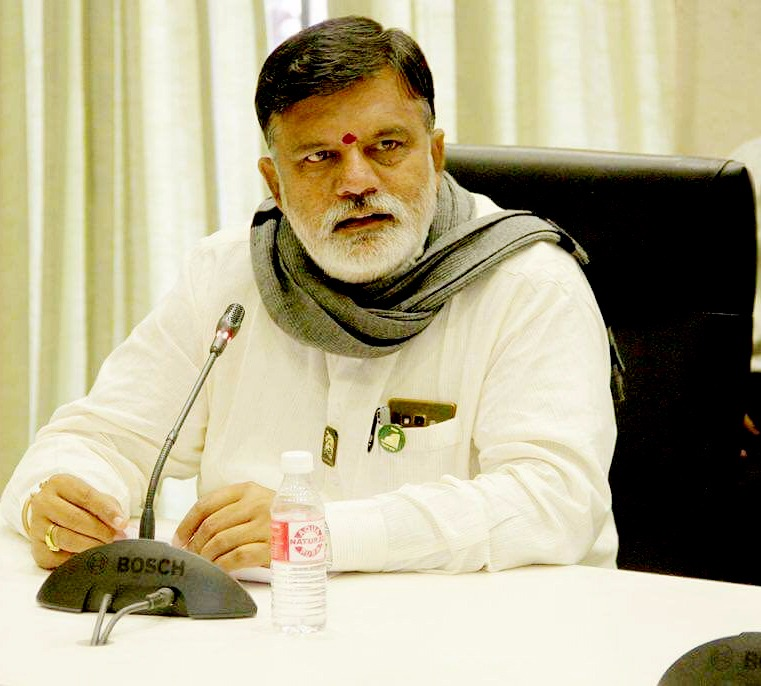
- Incumbent Rajabhau Waje
- Party: SS(UBT)
- Alliance: INDIA
- Elected year: 2024
- Preceded by: Hemant Godse

Nashik Lok Sabha constituency is one of the 48 Lok Sabha (parliamentary) constituencies of Maharashtra state in western India.

== Vidhan Sabha segments ==
Presently, after the implementation of delimitation of the parliamentary constituencies in 2008, Nashik Lok Sabha constituency comprises the following six Vidhan Sabha (Legislative Assembly) segments:

Constituency number	Name	Reserved for (SC/ST/None)	District	Party	2024 Lead
120	Sinnar	None	Nashik	NCP	SS(UBT)
123	Nashik East	None	Nashik	BJP	SHS
124	Nashik Central	None	Nashik	BJP	SS(UBT)
125	Nashik West	None	Nashik	BJP	SHS
126	Deolali	SC	Nashik	NCP	SS(UBT)
127	Igatpuri	ST	Nashik	NCP	SS(UBT)

== Members of Parliament ==
Year	Name	Party
1952	Govind Deshpande	Indian National Congress
1957	Bhaurao Gaikwad	Scheduled Castes Federation
1962	Govind Deshpande	Indian National Congress
1963^	Yashwantrao Chavan	Indian National Congress
1967	B. R. Kavade	Indian National Congress
1971	B. R. Kavade	Indian National Congress
1977	Vithalrao Hande	Peasants and Workers Party
1980	Pratap Wagh	Indian National Congress
1984	Muralidhar Mane	Indian National Congress
1989	Daulatrao Aher	Bharatiya Janata Party
1991	Vasant Pawar	Indian National Congress
1996	Rajaram Godase	Shiv Sena
1998	Madhavrao Thete Patil	Indian National Congress
1999	Uttamrao Dhikale	Shiv Sena
2004	Devidas Pingale	Nationalist Congress Party
2009	Sameer Bhujbal	Nationalist Congress Party
2014	Hemant Godse	Shiv Sena
2019	Hemant Godse	Shiv Sena
2024	Rajabhau Waje	Shiv Sena (UBT)

== Election results ==
=== General election 2024 ===
2024 Indian general elections: Nashik
Party	Candidate	Votes	%	±%
SS(UBT)	Rajabhau Waje	616,729	49.85	New
SS	Hemant Godse	454,728	36.75	▼13.47
VBA	Karan Gaikar	47,193	3.81	▼6.01
Independent	Shantigiri Maharaj	44,524	3.60	N/A
Margin of victory		162,001	13.09	▼12.95
Turnout		12,37,204	60.94	▲1.41
SS(UBT) gain from SS		Swing		

=== General election 2019 ===
2019 Indian general elections: Nashik
Party	Candidate	Votes	%	±%
SS	Hemant Godse	563,599	50.23	▼2.50
NCP	Sameer Bhujbal	271,395	24.19	▼8.58
Independent	Manikrao Kokate	134,527	11.99	New entry
VBA	Pavan Pawar	109,981	9.81	New entry
Margin of victory		292,204	26.04	
Turnout		11,22,092	59.53	
SS hold		Swing		

=== General election 2014 ===
2014 Indian general elections: Nashik
Party	Candidate	Votes	%	±%
SS	Hemant Godse	494,735	52.77	▲28.68
NCP	Chhagan Bhujbal	307,399	32.79	▼3.55
MNS	Pradeep Pawar	63,050	6.73	▼26.25
BSP	Dinkar Dharma Patil	20,896	2.23	▼0.54
CPI(M)	Tanaji Jaibhave	17,154	1.83	N/A
AAP	Vijay Pandhare	9,672	1.03	N/A
Margin of victory		187,336	19.98	▲16.62
Turnout		937,405	58.82	▲13.47
SS gain from NCP		Swing		

=== General election 2009 ===
2009 Indian general elections: Nashik
Party	Candidate	Votes	%	±%
NCP	Sameer Bhujbal	238,706	36.34	▼10.51
MNS	Hemant Godse	216,674	32.98	New entry
SS	Datta Gaikwad	158,251	24.09	▼20.47
BSP	Sudhirdas Maharaj	17,980	2.74	N/A
Independent	Rajendra Kadu	7,982	1.22	N/A
Margin of victory		22,032	3.36	▲1.07
Turnout		656,892	45.35	N/A
NCP hold		Swing		

=== General election 2004 ===
2004 Indian general elections: Nashik
Party	Candidate	Votes	%	±%
NCP	Devidas Pingale	307,612	46.85	NA
SS	Dashrath Patil	292,555	44.56	NA
CPI	Radheshyam Gunjal	17,831	2.72	NA
BSP	Gajiram Pawar	15,457	2.35	NA
Independent	Vimaltai Avhad	7,917	1.21	NA
Margin of victory		15,058	2.29	NA
Turnout		656,525	43.12	
NCP gain from SS		Swing		

=== General election 1999 ===
1999 Indian general elections: Nashik
Party	Candidate	Votes	%	±%
SS	Uttamrao Dhikale	303,084	38.9	NA
NCP	Madhavrao Patil	266,272	34.2	NA
INC	Gopalrao Gulave	148,346	19.1	NA
Margin of victory		36,812	4.7	
Turnout		778,284	57.9	
SS gain from INC		Swing		

=== General election 1998 ===
1998 Indian general election: Nashik
Party	Candidate	Votes	%	±%
INC	Madhavrao Patil	381,300	57.19	
SS	Rajaram Godase	278,908	41.83	
Margin of victory		102,392	15.36	
Turnout		666,781	51.65	
INC gain from SS		Swing		

=== General election 1996 ===
1996 Indian general election: Nashik
Party	Candidate	Votes	%	±%
SS	Rajaram Godase	295,044	47.41	
INC	Vasant Pawar	221,505	35.59	
BBM	Nivrutti Awhad	78,435	12.60	
Margin of victory		73,539	11.82	
Turnout		622,326	48.58	
SS gain from INC		Swing		

=== General election 1991 ===
1991 Indian general election: Nashik
Party	Candidate	Votes	%	±%
INC	Vasant Pawar	310,247	57.81	
BJP	Daulatrao Aher	168,881	31.47	
JD	Dattatray Katkade	45,511	8.48	
Margin of victory		141,366	26.34	
Turnout		536,639	50.72	
INC gain from BJP		Swing		

=== General election 1989 ===
1989 Indian general election: Nashik
Party	Candidate	Votes	%	±%
BJP	Daulatrao Aher	287,267	51.06	
INC	Muralidhar Mane	256,614	45.61	
Margin of victory		30,653	5.45	
Turnout		562,644	54.84	
BJP gain from INC		Swing		

=== General election 1984 ===
1984 Indian general election: Nashik
Party	Candidate	Votes	%	±%
INC	Muralidhar Mane	197,428	45.16	
IC(S)	Pralhad Patil Karad	159,882	36.57	
BJP	Ramrao Hire	37,615	8.60	
Margin of victory		37,546	8.59	
Turnout		437,177	56.51	
INC gain from INC		Swing		

=== General election 1980 ===
1980 Indian general election: Nashik
Party	Candidate	Votes	%	±%
INC	Pratap Wagh	204,155	53.47	
INC(U)	Vinayakrao Patil	157,900	41.36	
Margin of victory		46,255	12.11	
Turnout		381,796	53.42	
INC gain from PWPI		Swing		

=== General election 1977 ===
1977 Indian general election: Nashik
Party	Candidate	Votes	%	±%
PWPI	Vithalrao Hande	164,258	50.33	
INC	Baburao Thakre	153,017	46.89	
Margin of victory		11,241	3.44	
Turnout		326,346	54.70	
PWPI gain from INC		Swing		

=== General election 1971 ===
1971 Indian general election: Nasik
Party	Candidate	Votes	%	±%
INC(R)	B. R. Kavade	208,898	74.15	
BKD	Dhairyashilrao Pawar	63,157	22.42	
Margin of victory		145,741	51.73	
Turnout		281,736	57.35	
INC hold		Swing		

=== General election 1967 ===
1967 Indian general election: Nasik
Party	Candidate	Votes	%	±%
INC	B. R. Kavade	155,632	56.60	
RPI	Bhaurao Gaikwad	119,325	43.40	
Margin of victory		36,307	13.20	
Turnout		274,957	65.79	
INC hold		Swing		

=== General election 1962 ===
1962 Indian general election: Nasik
Party	Candidate	Votes	%	±%
INC	Govind Deshpande	110,242	57.67	
RPI	Bhaurao Gaikwad	50,588	26.46	
PSP	Namdeo Pagare	18,679	9.77	
Independent	Ramchandra Bhoye	11,666	6.10	
Margin of victory		59,654	31.21	
Turnout		191,175	54.18	
INC gain from SCF		Swing		

=== General election 1957 ===
1957 Indian general election: Nasik
Party	Candidate	Votes	%	±%
SCF	Bhaurao Gaikwad	85,437	48.44	
INC	Govind Deshpande	74,068	41.99	
Independent	Savleram Lilke	16,879	9.57	
Margin of victory		11,369	6.45	
Turnout		176,384	48.13	
SCF gain from INC		Swing		

=== General election 1951 ===
1951 Indian general election: Nasik Central
Party	Candidate	Votes	%	±%
INC	Govind Deshpande	89,261	43.50	
Socialist	Narayanrao Zodge	45,600	22.22	
Kamgar Kisan Paksha	Gopal Saundarkar	26,885	13.10	
PWPI	Shankar Bodhale	15,051	7.34	
CPI	Karbhari Wagh	14,383	7.01	
RRP	Vishnu Kelkar	8,427	4.11	
Margin of victory		43,661	21.28	
Turnout		205,175	53.17	
INC win		Swing		

== See also ==
- Nashik district
- List of constituencies of the Lok Sabha
