= Gaveet Nirmala Ramesh =

Indian politician

Maharashtra Legislative Assembly
- In office 2009–2019
- Preceded by: Kashinath Mengal
- Succeeded by: Hiraman Khoskar
- Constituency: Igatpuri

Maharashtra Legislative Assembly

Personal details
- Party: Shiv Sena
- Other party: Indian National Congress
- Children: Harshal, Nayana
- Relatives: Manikrao Gavit (Father)
- Occupation: Politician

Gaveet Nirmala Ramesh, sometimes Nirmala Gavit, is an Indian politician from Maharashtra. She is a two-term member of the Maharashtra Legislative Assembly.

== Constituency ==
Gaveet Nirmala Ramesh was elected from the Igatpuri assembly constituency Maharashtra.

== Political Party ==
She is a member of the Indian National Congress.

== Positions held ==
- Maharashtra Legislative Assembly MLA
- Terms in office: 2009-2014 and 2014–2019.
