= Kondivade Andar Mawal =

Village in Maharashtra

- Village
- Location in Maharashtra, India Kondivade Andar Mawal (India)
- Coordinates: 18.8314798°N 73.5946254°E
- Country: India
- State: Maharashtra
- District: Pune
- Tehsil: Maval

Government
  - Type: Panchayati Raj
  - Body: Gram panchayat

Area
  - Total: 496.04 ha (1,225.7 acres)

Population (2011)
  - Total: 951
  - Density: 192/km^{2} (497/sq mi)
- Sex ratio 473/478 ♂/♀

Languages
  - Official: Marathi
  - Other spoken: Hindi
- Time zone: UTC+5:30 (IST)
- Pin code: 412106
- Telephone code: 02114
- ISO 3166 code: IN-MH
- Vehicle registration: MH-14
- Website: pune.nic.in

Kondivade Andar Mawal is a village and gram panchayat in India, situated in Mawal taluka of Pune district in the state of Maharashtra. It encompasses an area of 496.04 ha (1,226 acres).

== Administration ==
The village is administrated by a sarpanch, an elected representative who leads a gram panchayat. At the time of the 2011 Census of India, the village was the headquarters for the eponymous gram panchayat, which also governed the village of Kondivade Nane Mawal.

== Demographics ==
At the 2011 census, the village comprised 174 households. The population of 951 was split between 473 males and 478 females.

== Air travel connectivity ==
The closest airport to the village is Pune Airport.

== See also ==
- List of villages in Mawal taluka
