= Sansari =

- Village
- Location in Rajasthan, India
- Coordinates: 25.481°N 73.703°E
- Country: India
- State: Rajasthan
- District: Pali
- Established: 1607
- Founder: Thakur Bhopat Singh

Population (2011)
  - Total: 981
- PIN: 306022
- Telephone code: 02934
- Vehicle registration: RJ-22

Sansari is a village in Rajasthan, India. It is located on Phulad–Desuri road. It is panchayat headquarters for 4 villages (Ashapura a.k.a. Akar, Guda Gopinath, Guda Durjan and Sansari). Sansari is located around 65 km from the district headquarters Pali, and 27 km from Tehsil headquarters in Desuri.

It is the last village in Desuri Tehsil, after which Marwar Junction Tehsil starts. Currently MNREGA office has been opened in Sansari, for the villages in Sansari Panchayat.

== Demographics ==
As per Jodhpur State census 1931, total population was 282, (Males 141, Females 141) and total households of 64. Out of 282, 2 were Jains and rest were Hindus. As per census of India 2011, total population is 981 ( Males - 468, Females - 513) and total households of 201.
