= Igatpuri Assembly constituency =

Constituency of the Maharashtra legislative assembly in India

Coordinates: 19.697°N 73.561°E

Igatpuri
- Constituency No. 127 for the Maharashtra Legislative Assembly

Constituency details
- Country: India
- Region: Western India
- State: Maharashtra
- District: Nashik
- Lok Sabha constituency: Nashik
- Established: 1957
- Total electors: 280,867
- Reservation: ST

Member of Legislative Assembly
- 15th Maharashtra Legislative Assembly
- Incumbent Hiraman Khoskar
- Party: NCP
- Alliance: NDA
- Elected year: 2024

Igatpuri Assembly constituency is one of the 288 constituencies of the Maharashtra Legislative Assembly, in Indian state of Maharashtra. It is a part of the Nashik Lok Sabha constituency and is reserved for members of the Scheduled Tribes. It comprises Trimbakeshwar tehsil and parts of Igatpuri tehsil, both in Nashik district.

== Members of the Legislative Assembly ==
Year	Member	Party
1957	Govardhane Punjaji Laxman	Communist Party of India
1962	Mulchand Gothi	Indian National Congress
1967	S. G. Chavare	Indian National Congress
1972	Vithalrao Ghare	Indian National Congress
1978	Bhau Sakru Wagh	Indian National Congress (I)
1980	Vithalrao Ghare	Indian National Congress (I)
1985	Shivram Zole	Indian Congress
1990	Yadavrao Bambale	Bharatiya Janata Party
1995	Shivram Zole	Indian National Congress
1999	Pandurang Gangad	Shiv Sena
2004	Kashinath Mengal	Shiv Sena
2009	Nirmala Gavit	Indian National Congress
2014	Nirmala Gavit	Indian National Congress
2019	Hiraman Khoskar	Indian National Congress
2024	Hiraman Khoskar	Nationalist Congress Party

== Election results ==
=== Assembly Election 2024 ===
2024 Maharashtra Legislative Assembly election : Igatpuri
Party	Candidate	Votes	%	±%
NCP	Hiraman Khoskar	117,575	55.25%	New
INC	Luckybhau Bhika Jadhav	30,994	14.56%	▼38.14
Independent	Gaveet Nirmala Ramesh	23,776	11.17%	New
MNS	Kashinath Dagadu Mengal	20,374	9.57%	▲5.58
VBA	Bhaurao Kashinath Dagale	6,522	3.06%	▼3.01
Independent	Bhagwan Rambhau Madhe	2,884	1.36%	New
NOTA	None of the Above	2,219	1.04%	▼0.82
Independent	Shengal Vikas Mohan	2,050	0.96%	New
Margin of victory		86,581	40.69%	▲21.47
Turnout		2,15,021	76.56%	▲12.55
Total valid votes		2,12,802		
Registered electors		2,80,867		▲8.11
NCP gain from INC		Swing	▲2.54	

=== Assembly Election 2019 ===
2019 Maharashtra Legislative Assembly election : Igatpuri
Party	Candidate	Votes	%	±%
INC	Hiraman Khoskar	86,561	52.71%	▲20.70
SS	Nirmala Ramesh Gavit	55,006	33.49%	▲8.25
VBA	Luckybhau Bhika Jadhav	9,975	6.07%	New
MNS	Yogesh Kiran Shevre	6,566	4.00%	▲1.91
NOTA	None of the Above	3,059	1.86%	▲0.11
Independent	Shaila Shioram Zole	1,506	0.92%	New
Bhartiya Tribal Party	Shivram Dharma Khane	1,461	0.89%	New
Independent	Adv. Yashwant Walu Pardhi	1,278	0.78%	New
Margin of victory		31,555	19.21%	▲12.45
Turnout		1,67,336	64.41%	▼1.94
Total valid votes		1,64,230		
Registered electors		2,59,809		▲10.27
INC hold		Swing	▲20.70	

=== Assembly Election 2014 ===
2014 Maharashtra Legislative Assembly election : Igatpuri
Party	Candidate	Votes	%	±%
INC	Gaveet Nirmala Ramesh	49,128	32.01%	▲8.54
SS	Shivram Shankar Zole	38,751	25.24%	▲9.63
NCP	Hiraman Khoskar	21,747	14.17%	New
Independent	Mengal Kashinath Dagdu	17,167	11.18%	New
BJP	Chandrakant Mahadev Khade	11,250	7.33%	New
Independent	Sandeep Raghunath Jadhav	6,876	4.48%	New
MNS	Lachake Prakash Aappa	3,211	2.09%	▼18.37
NOTA	None of the Above	2,688	1.75%	New
Margin of victory		10,377	6.76%	▲3.77
Turnout		1,56,215	66.30%	▲4.90
Total valid votes		1,53,501		
Registered electors		2,35,601		▲14.23
INC hold		Swing	▲8.54	

=== Assembly Election 2009 ===
2009 Maharashtra Legislative Assembly election : Igatpuri
Party	Candidate	Votes	%	±%
INC	Gaveet Nirmala Ramesh	29,155	23.46%	▼5.88
MNS	Mengal Kashinath Dagdu	25,433	20.47%	New
SS	Ghare Ramdas Vitthalrao	19,406	15.62%	▼20.82
PWPI	Shivram Shankar Zole	14,108	11.35%	▲7.00
CPI(M)	Anjana Surendra Raut	11,514	9.27%	New
Independent	Sabale Pundalik Dharma	7,461	6.00%	New
Independent	Mengal Vilas Laxman	2,561	2.06%	New
Margin of victory		3,722	3.00%	▼4.10
Turnout		1,24,271	60.25%	▲3.81
Total valid votes		1,24,269		
Registered electors		2,06,251		▲13.93
INC gain from SS		Swing	▼12.98	

=== Assembly Election 2004 ===
2004 Maharashtra Legislative Assembly election : Igatpuri
Party	Candidate	Votes	%	±%
SS	Mengal Kashinath Dagdu	37,233	36.44%	▲6.46
INC	Damse Vasant Madhavrao	29,985	29.34%	▲0.23
Independent	Shivram Shankar Zole	22,036	21.57%	New
PWPI	Khatele Hiraman Bhima	4,449	4.35%	New
BSP	Kunde Chandar Balkrishna	4,066	3.98%	New
Independent	Rongte Baliram Sitaram	2,351	2.30%	New
Independent	Gavari Asha Genu	1,144	1.12%	New
Margin of victory		7,248	7.09%	▲6.23
Turnout		1,02,212	56.46%	▲10.40
Total valid votes		1,02,184		
Registered electors		1,81,041		▲14.58
SS hold		Swing	▲6.46	

=== Assembly Election 1999 ===
1999 Maharashtra Legislative Assembly election : Igatpuri
Party	Candidate	Votes	%	±%
SS	Gangad Pandurang Chapu (Baba)	21,807	29.98%	▲6.92
INC	Damse Vasant Madhavrao	21,179	29.11%	▼1.87
NCP	Shivram Shankar Zole	20,572	28.28%	New
CPI(M)	Mengal Kashinath Dagdu	3,765	5.18%	New
Independent	Lande Madhukar Manaji	3,721	5.11%	New
Independent	Ghode Manohar Bhikaji	1,215	1.67%	New
Independent	Ware Mangesh Sakru	490	0.67%	New
Margin of victory		628	0.86%	▼5.71
Turnout		79,106	50.07%	▼23.16
Total valid votes		72,749		
Registered electors		1,57,998		▲1.53
SS gain from INC		Swing	▼1.01	

=== Assembly Election 1995 ===
1995 Maharashtra Legislative Assembly election : Igatpuri
Party	Candidate	Votes	%	±%
INC	Shivram Shankar Zole	33,365	30.98%	▲4.04
PWPI	Gangad Pandoorang Chapu	26,289	24.41%	▲21.41
SS	Zole Pandurang Shankar	24,829	23.06%	New
Independent	Bambale Yadavrao Anandrao	8,128	7.55%	New
Independent	Kamadi Pandoorang Soma	5,003	4.65%	New
BBM	Thawale Bhika Lahu	4,645	4.31%	New
Independent	Shengal Ekanath Narayan	2,358	2.19%	New
Margin of victory		7,076	6.57%	▲2.27
Turnout		1,13,043	72.64%	▲21.13
Total valid votes		1,07,692		
Registered electors		1,55,624		▲6.49
INC gain from BJP		Swing	▼1.27	

=== Assembly Election 1990 ===
1990 Maharashtra Legislative Assembly election : Igatpuri
Party	Candidate	Votes	%	±%
BJP	Yadavrao Anandrao Bambale	22,656	32.25%	New
Independent	Ghare Vitthalrao Ganpat	19,632	27.95%	New
INC	Shivram Shankar Zole	18,924	26.94%	▼4.88
INS(SCS)	Agiwale Kacharu Yashawant	4,926	7.01%	New
PWPI	Khatele Narayan Bahu	2,106	3.00%	New
Independent	Shankarrao Kalu Zole	1,039	1.48%	New
Independent	Lande Madhukar Manaji	823	1.17%	New
Margin of victory		3,024	4.30%	▼3.33
Turnout		71,879	49.19%	▲2.43
Total valid votes		70,252		
Registered electors		1,46,140		▲24.31
BJP gain from IC(S)		Swing	▼7.20	

=== Assembly Election 1985 ===
1985 Maharashtra Legislative Assembly election : Igatpuri
Party	Candidate	Votes	%	±%
IC(S)	Shivram Shankar Zole	21,168	39.45%	New
INC	Ghare Vitthalrao Ganpat	17,073	31.82%	New
Independent	Bamale Yadavrao Anandrao	7,052	13.14%	New
Independent	Kamadi Soma Sonu	6,007	11.20%	New
Independent	Chandre Chander Bhau	2,030	3.78%	New
Independent	Pawar Madhukar Pandit	322	0.60%	New
Margin of victory		4,095	7.63%	▼5.94
Turnout		55,150	46.91%	▲1.43
Total valid votes		53,652		
Registered electors		1,17,561		▲7.03
IC(S) gain from INC(I)		Swing	▲3.65	

=== Assembly Election 1980 ===
1980 Maharashtra Legislative Assembly election : Igatpuri
Party	Candidate	Votes	%	±%
INC(I)	Ghare Vitthalrao Ganpat	17,389	35.81%	▼2.58
INC(U)	Wagh Bhau Sakru	10,798	22.24%	New
Independent	Achari Ganpat Soma	8,483	17.47%	New
JP	Damse Madhavrao Sakharam	7,051	14.52%	▼10.00
Independent	Shivram Shankar Zole	4,581	9.43%	New
Margin of victory		6,591	13.57%	▼0.30
Turnout		49,993	45.51%	▼6.28
Total valid votes		48,562		
Registered electors		1,09,841		▲5.82
INC(I) hold		Swing	▼2.58	

=== Assembly Election 1978 ===
1978 Maharashtra Legislative Assembly election : Igatpuri
Party	Candidate	Votes	%	±%
INC(I)	Wagh Bhau Sakru	20,120	38.39%	New
JP	Damse Madhavrao Sakharam	12,850	24.52%	New
INC	Khatle Narayan Bhau	10,950	20.89%	▼34.43
CPI	Bomade Laxman Krishna	6,042	11.53%	New
Independent	Reval Bhikunath Benduji	684	1.31%	New
Independent	Mande Laxman Dagadu	644	1.23%	New
Independent	More Nandlal Vithal	587	1.12%	New
Margin of victory		7,270	13.87%	▼15.40
Turnout		54,168	52.19%	▲7.43
Total valid votes		52,408		
Registered electors		1,03,798		▲7.23
INC(I) gain from INC		Swing	▼16.93	

=== Assembly Election 1972 ===
1972 Maharashtra Legislative Assembly election : Igatpuri
Party	Candidate	Votes	%	±%
INC	Ghare Vitthalrao Ganpat	23,060	55.32%	▼10.04
BKD	Wagh Bhau Sakru	10,859	26.05%	New
Independent	Agiwaleshwaravan Soma	4,312	10.35%	New
PWPI	Sakharam Nana Jadhav	2,151	5.16%	New
ABJS	Uttam Thamaji Bharmal	1,299	3.12%	New
Margin of victory		12,201	29.27%	▼1.46
Turnout		43,062	44.49%	▼5.26
Total valid votes		41,681		
Registered electors		96,801		▲18.56
INC hold		Swing	▼10.04	

=== Assembly Election 1967 ===
1967 Maharashtra Legislative Assembly election : Igatpuri
Party	Candidate	Votes	%	±%
INC	S. G. Chavare	25,788	65.36%	▲23.78
CPI	L. K. Bombale	13,665	34.64%	▼3.64
Margin of victory		12,123	30.73%	▲27.42
Turnout		41,768	51.16%	▼0.93
Total valid votes		39,453		
Registered electors		81,644		▲30.34
INC hold		Swing	▲23.78	

=== Assembly Election 1962 ===
1962 Maharashtra Legislative Assembly election : Igatpuri
Party	Candidate	Votes	%	±%
INC	Mulchand Shrimal Gothi	12,829	41.58%	New
CPI	Shabaji Ramchandra Khatale	11,808	38.27%	New
PSP	Joquim Semoes	5,766	18.69%	New
Independent	Punjaram Kalu Salwa	449	1.46%	New
Margin of victory		1,021	3.31%	
Turnout		32,922	52.56%	
Total valid votes		30,852		
Registered electors		62,639		
INC win (new seat)				

== See also ==
- Nashik district
- List of constituencies of the Maharashtra Legislative Assembly
