= Nashik East Assembly constituency =

Constituency of the Maharashtra legislative assembly in India

Coordinates: 19.996°N 73.833°E

Nashik East
- Constituency No. 123 for the Maharashtra Legislative Assembly

Constituency details
- Country: India
- Region: Western India
- State: Maharashtra
- District: Nashik
- Lok Sabha constituency: Nashik
- Established: 2008
- Total electors: 409,539
- Reservation: None

Member of Legislative Assembly
- 15th Maharashtra Legislative Assembly
- Incumbent Rahul Uttamrao Dhikale
- Party: BJP
- Elected year: 2024

Nashik East Assembly constituency is one of the 288 Vidhan Sabha (legislative assembly) constituencies of Maharashtra state, western India. This constituency is located in Nashik district. It is one of the six assembly segments under Nashik Lok Sabha constituency and was established in 2008 after the passing of the Delimitation of Parliamentary and Assembly Constituencies Order, 2008.

== Geographical scope ==
The constituency comprises parts of Nashik taluka viz. the following wards of Nashik Municipal Corporation - 1 to 10, 14, 16, 30 to 35, 40 to 42 and 67 to 70.

== Members of the Legislative Assembly ==
Year	Member	Party
Till 2009 : Constituency did not exist
2009	Uttamrao Dhikale	Maharashtra Navnirman Sena
2014	Balasaheb Sanap	Bharatiya Janata Party
2019	Rahul Dhikale	Bharatiya Janata Party
2024	Rahul Dhikale	Bharatiya Janata Party

== Election results ==
=== Assembly Election 2024 ===
2024 Maharashtra Legislative Assembly election : Nashik East
Party	Candidate	Votes	%	±%
BJP	Rahul Uttamrao Dhikale	156,246	64.81%	▲16.30
NCP-SP	Ganesh (Bhau) Baban Gite	68,429	28.38%	New
VBA	Ravindrakumar (Aanna) Janardan Pagare	5,191	2.15%	▼3.52
MNS	Prasad (Balasaheb) Dattatray Sanap	4,987	2.07%	New
Nirbhay Maharashtra Party	Bhabhe Jitendra Naresh (Jitendra Bhave)	2,085	0.86%	New
NOTA	None of the Above	1,989	0.83%	▼0.91
Margin of victory		87,817	36.42%	▲29.68
Turnout		243,079	59.35%	▲8.82
Total valid votes		241,090		
Registered electors		409,539		▲15.20
BJP hold		Swing	▲16.30	

=== Assembly Election 2019 ===
2019 Maharashtra Legislative Assembly election : Nashik East
Party	Candidate	Votes	%	±%
BJP	Rahul Uttamrao Dhikale	86,304	48.50%	▲0.76
NCP	Balasaheb Mahadu Sanap	74,304	41.76%	▲33.90
VBA	Santosh Ashok Nath	10,096	5.67%	New
INC	Ganesh Sukdeo Unhawane	4,505	2.53%	▼9.27
NOTA	None of the Above	3,090	1.74%	▲0.65
Margin of victory		12,000	6.74%	▼21.30
Turnout		181,206	50.97%	▼1.96
Total valid votes		177,929		
Registered electors		355,502		▲11.83
BJP hold		Swing	▲0.76	

=== Assembly Election 2014 ===
2014 Maharashtra Legislative Assembly election : Nashik East
Party	Candidate	Votes	%	±%
BJP	Balasaheb Mahadu Sanap	78,941	47.74%	▲26.80
SS	Chandrakant (Raju Anna) Pandurang Lavte	32,567	19.70%	New
INC	Nimse Udhav Baburav	19,509	11.80%	▼2.68
NCP	Pingale Devidas Anandrao	13,005	7.86%	New
MNS	Ramesh Shankar Dhongade(R. D.)	12,488	7.55%	▼26.83
BSP	Gangurde Mukund Hiraman	6,693	4.05%	New
NOTA	None of the Above	1,795	1.09%	New
Margin of victory		46,374	28.05%	▲14.60
Turnout		167,198	52.59%	▲3.50
Total valid votes		165,353		
Registered electors		317,898		▲10.65
BJP gain from MNS		Swing	▲13.36	

=== Assembly Election 2009 ===
2009 Maharashtra Legislative Assembly election : Nashik East
Party	Candidate	Votes	%	±%
MNS	Uttamrao Dhikale	47,924	34.39%	New
BJP	Balasaheb Mahadu Sanap	29,189	20.94%	New
INC	Pangavhane Rajaram Dinkarrao	20,182	14.48%	New
Independent	Pingale Devidas Anandrao	14,263	10.23%	New
Independent	Adhav Dinkar Gotiram	8,833	6.34%	New
Independent	Ghiya Subhash Babulal	5,728	4.11%	New
RPI(A)	Unhavane Ganesh Sukadeo	4,609	3.31%	New
Margin of victory		18,735	13.44%	
Turnout		139,441	48.53%	
Total valid votes		139,372		
Registered electors		287,308		
MNS win (new seat)				
