= Vijay Pandhare =

Former bureaucrat, anti-corruption activist and political leader

Vijay Balwant Pandhare
- Occupations: Chief engineer, irrigation department
- Employer: Government of Maharashtra
- Known for: Whistleblower in Maharashtra Irrigation Scam 2012
- Political party: Aam Aadmi Party

Vijay Pandhare is a former bureaucrat from Maharashtra, India. He was the chief engineer of the Water Resources Department and a member of the state-level technical advisory committee. He is state executive committee member at Aam Aadmi Party Maharashtra.

== Whistle blowing ==
Pandhare is a whistleblower who wrote to the chief minister of the state of Maharashtra and its governor alleging irregularities and cost inflation in irrigation projects. The controversy raised by these communications caused the deputy chief minister of the state Ajit Pawar to resign. In his letters he pointed out that Rs 120 billion spent on lift irrigation projects in the state are a total waste as around 99 per cent of the total 227 projects in Maharashtra are not working and 90 per cent never began functioning.

Pandhare, in a letter to other engineers, alleged that corruption can be controlled by curtailing the powers. The irregularities were so serious Pandhare alleged that the government was "...playing with people's lives".

== Political career ==
In December 2013, after his retirement from active service, Pandhare joined the Aam Aadmi Party (AAP).

He unsuccessfully fought the 2014 Lok Sabha elections from Nashik, losing his deposit. He secured sixth position with 9,672 votes, losing to Hemant Godse, who got 494,735 votes. Even before the election results were announced, he relocated to Buldhana, and declared that he won't contest elections any more. He claimed that "more than 98% of the people" associated with AAP did it merely for publicity.
