= Uttamrao Dhikale =

Indian politician

Uttamrao Nathuji Dhikale
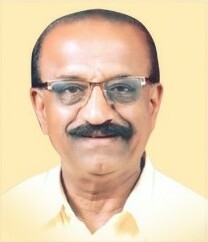

Member of Maharashtra Legislative Assembly
- In office 2009–2014
- Succeeded by: Balasaheb Sanap
- Constituency: Nashik East

Member of Parliament, Lok Sabha
- In office 1999–2004
- Preceded by: Madhavrao Patil
- Succeeded by: Devidas Pingale
- Constituency: Nashik

Personal details
- Born: 10 February 1940 Vinchur, Dist. Nashik
- Died: 7 April 2015 (aged 75)
- Party: Indian National Congress, Shivsena, Maharashtra Navnirman Sena
- Children: Rahul Uttamrao Dhikale
- Education: Bachelor of Law BSL LLB
- Alma mater: University of Pune

Uttamrao Nathuji Dhikale (10 February 1940 – 7 April 2015) was a member of the 13th Lok Sabha of India. He represented the Nashik constituency of Maharashtra from Shivsena. He later joined Maharashtra Navnirman Sena and was a member of Maharashtra Legislative Assembly from Nashik East Constituency. His son Rahul Uttamrao Dhikale is currently a Member of legislative Assembly (Bharatiya Janata Party) from Nashik East constituency party.

== Early life ==
Uttamrao Dhikale was born on 10 February 1940 in Vinchur. He completed his education with a Bachelor in Law (LLB) degree from Pune University. At the age of 27, he became the youngest councilor in the Nashik Municipal Corporation.

== Positions held ==
- Councilor in Nashik Municipal Corporation (1967–1980)
- Genearal Secretary of Nashik District Congress Committee (1980)
- Director Nashik District Central Co-operative Bank (1974–2013)
- Chairman Nashik District Central Co-operative Bank (1974–1975, 1982–1983, 2007–2008)
- Mayor of Nashik Municipality (1967–1968)
- Mayor Nashik Municipal Corporation (1995–1996)
- Member of Parliament in the Lok Sabha (1999–2004)
- Member of Committee on Government Assurances (1999–2000)
- Member of Consultative Committee, Ministry of Agriculture (2000–2004)
- Member of Legislative Assembly Maharashtra (2009–2014)
