= Hemant Godse =

Indian politician

Member of Parliament, Lok Sabha
- In office 16 May 2014 – 4 June 2024
- Preceded by: Sameer Bhujbal
- Succeeded by: Rajabhau Waje
- Constituency: Nashik

Personal details
- Born: 3 August 1970 (age 56) Deolali, Maharashtra, India
- Party: Shiv Sena
- Occupation: Politician

Hemant Tukaram Godse (born 3 August 1970) was a member of the 17th Lok Sabha of India. He represented Nashik constituency of Maharashtra and is a member of the Shinde Shiv Sena . He was previously a member of the Maharashtra Navnirman Sena and contested the same constituency in the 2009 elections, but lost to the NCP's Sameer Bhujbal by 24,000 votes.

In 2014, He defeated NCP strongman and former deputy chief minister of Maharashtra Chhagan Bhujbal who contested from the Nationalist Congress Party by 1,87,336 votes by polling 4,94,735 votes against Bhujbal's 3,07,399. He again defeated Sameer Bhujbal by 3 lakh votes in the 2019 Lok Sabha election. He became the 2nd MP to get a repeated term after 56 years.

== Positions held ==
- 2007-2012: Member, Zila Parishad, Nashik
- 2008-2009: Member, Senate of Pune University
- 2012-2014: Elected as Councillor, Nashik Municipal Corporation
- 2014: Elected to 16th Lok Sabha
- Sep. 2014 onwards : Member, Standing Committee on Information Technology
- May 2019: Elected to 17th Lok sabha
