= Rahul Uttamrao Dhikale =

Indian politician

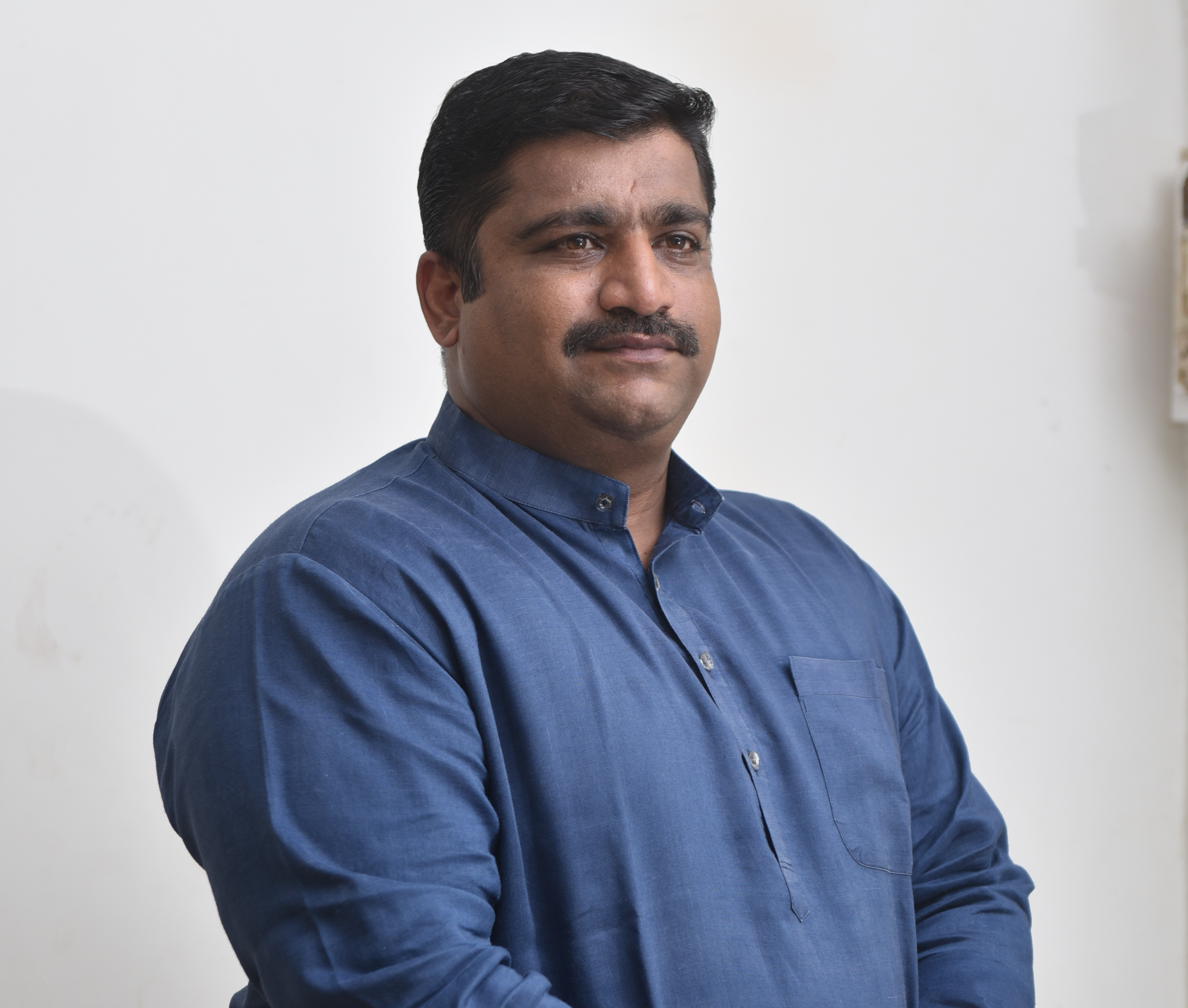

Member of Maharashtra Legislative Assembly
- Incumbent
- Assumed office 23 October 2019
- Preceded by: Balasaheb Sanap
- Constituency: Nashik East

Personal details
- Born: 14 August 1979 (age 47) Nashik
- Party: Bharatiya Janata Party
- Education: Bachelor of Law
- Occupation: Politician

Rahul Uttamrao Dhikale is an Indian politician. He is a Member of the Bhartiya Janata Party. In 2019 & 2024, he was elected as Member of the Legislative Assembly of the Nashik East Constituency in Maharashtra.

== Early life and family ==
Rahul Dhikale was born on 14 August 1979. His father late Uttamrao Dhikale was a member of 13th Loksabha of India from Nashik Constituency. His education is Bachelor in Law(LLB) from N.B.T. Law College Nashik. At the age of twelve, Rahul Dhikale trained in wrestling and participated in Maharashtra Hind Kesari competitions. In the year of 1995, Rahul Dhikale won Nashik's Mayor Kesari Competition.

== Political career ==
Rahul Dhikale was elected as Councilor in Nashik Municipal Corporation (2012-2017). In 2014-2015 he was Chairman of Standing Committee in Nashik Municipal Corporation. In 2019, Rahul Dhikale won election of Legislative Assembly in Maharashtra from Nashik East Assembly Constituency and has been re-elected as an MLA for the second time in a row in the 2024 Maharashtra Assembly elections.

== Awards ==
- Winner of Nashik's Mayor Kesari - 1995
