= Devidas Anandrao Pingale =

Indian politician

Pingale Devidas Anandrao

Member of Parliament, Lok Sabha
- In office 2004–2009
- Constituency: Nashik

Personal details
- Born: 12 March 1961 (age 65) Nashik, Maharashtra, India
- Party: NCP
- Spouse: Chandrakala Devidas Pingle
- Children: Yogesh, Nitin, Deepali & Ashwini
- As of 16 September, 2006

Pingale Devidas Anandrao (born 12 March 1961) is a member of the 14th Lok Sabha of India. He represents the Nashik constituency of Maharashtra and is a member of the Nationalist Congress Party (NCP) political party.
