= Rajaram Godase =

Indian politician (born 1961)

Rajaram Godase (born 18 April 1961 in Sansari, Nasik) was a member of the 11th Lok Sabha of India. He represented the Nashik constituency of Maharashtra and is a member of the Shiv Sena political party.
