= Bhaurao Gaikwad =

Indian social activist and politician

Karmaveer Dadasaheb Gaikwad
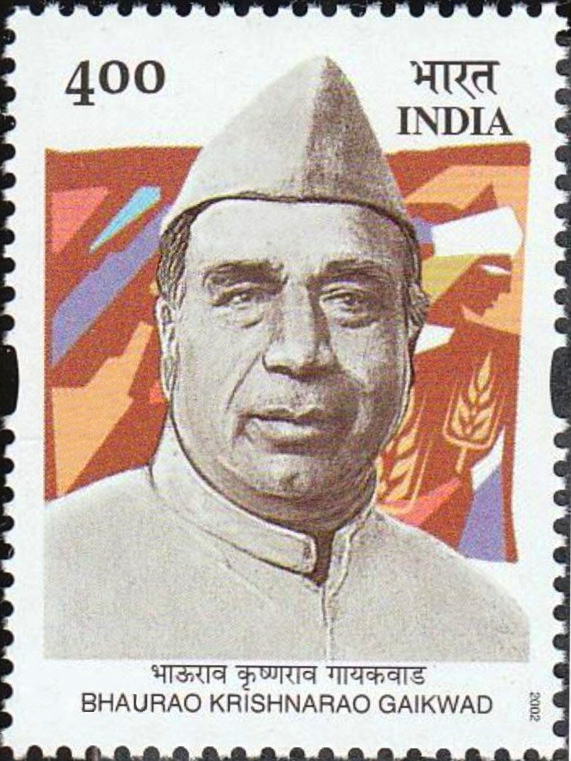
- Gaikwad on a 2002 stamp of India

Member of Parliament, Lok Sabha
- In office 1957–1962

Member of Parliament, Rajya Sabha for Maharashtra
- In office 1962–1968

Personal details
- Born: Bhaurao Krishnaji Gaikwad; 15 October 1902 Ambe, Bombay Presidency, British India (now in Maharashtra, India)
- Died: 29 December 1971 (aged 69) Willingdon Hospital, New Delhi
- Party: Republican Party of India
- Spouse(s): Seetabai (m. 1912 – d. 1968); Geetabai (m. 1921)
- Occupation: politician
- Profession: Social activist

Bhaurao Krishnaji Gaikwad (15 October 1902 – 29 December 1971), also known as Dadasaheb Gaikwad, was an Indian politician and social worker from Maharashtra. He was founder member of the Republican Party of India and was a member of parliament in both the Lok Sabha (1957 - 1962) and Rajya Sabha (1962 - 1968). He was a close colleague and follower of human rights leader B. R. Ambedkar. The people of Maharashtra honoured him with the sobriquet Karmaveer (King of actions) and the Government of India awarded him with Padma Shri in 1968 for his dedicated service to society.

== Life ==
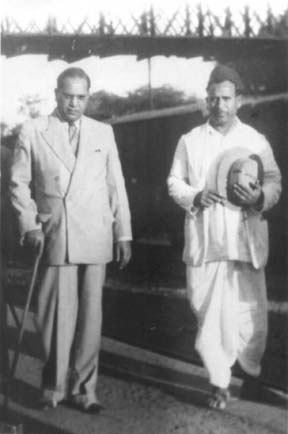
Gaikwad (right) with Babasaheb Ambedkar (left) at Nashik railway station, November 1945

Gaikwad was born on 15 October 1902 into Mahar family at Ambe village in Dindori tehsil, Nashik district of Maharashtra.

== Conversion ==
Gaikwad embraced Buddhism at the hands of Babasaheb Ambedkar at Deekshabhoomi, Nagpur on 14 October 1956. He imparted Buddha Dhamma Diksha to thousands at Chaitya Bhoomi, Mumbai on 7 December 1956.

== Legacy ==
Government of Maharashtra gives special assistance to socially and economically backward people on his name, Karmaveer Dadasaheb Gaikwad Sabalikaran & Swabhiman Yojana.

The Government of India issued a commemorative stamp in his honour in 2002.
