= Daulatrao Aher =

Indian politician

Dr. Daulatrao Aher
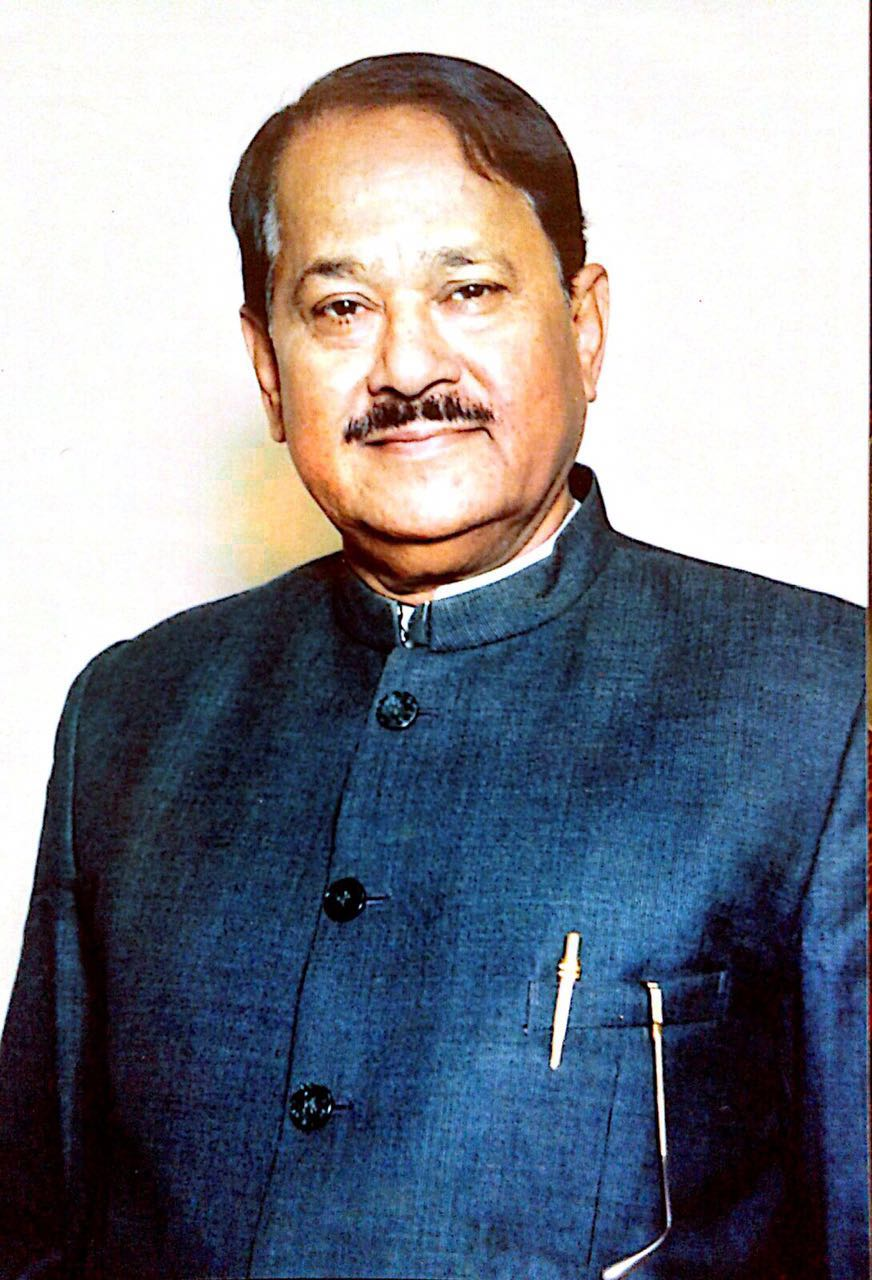
- Dr D. S. Aher

Member of Parliament, Lok Sabha
- In office 1989–1991
- Preceded by: Muralidhar Mane
- Succeeded by: Vasant Pawar
- Constituency: Nashik

Minister of Public Health, Family Welfare, Medical Education and Drugs
- In office 1995–1999

Personal details
- Born: 1 November 1943 Deola, Nashik, Maharashtra
- Died: 19 January 2016 (aged 72) Nashik, Maharashtra
- Party: Bharatiya Janata Party
- Spouse: Smt. Alka Daulatrao Aher
- Children: Dr. Rahul Daulatrao Aher
- Education: B. J. Medical College
- Occupation: Medical Practitioner
- As of 2 January, 2017

Dr. Daulatrao Aher (1 November 1943 – 19 January 2016) was an Indian politician who served as a member of the 9th Lok Sabha. He represented the Nashik constituency of Maharashtra and was affiliated with the Bharatiya Janata Party (BJP).
