= Grand coalition =

Arrangement in a multi-party parliamentary system

A grand coalition is an arrangement in a multi-party parliamentary system in which the two or more political parties of opposing political ideologies unite in a coalition government. When most parties with legislative representation are included, generally at times of crisis, the coalition may be referred to as a national unity government.

== Causes of a grand coalition ==
Occasionally circumstances arise in which normally opposing parties may find it desirable to form a government together. For example, in a national crisis such as a war or depression, people may feel a need for national unity and stability that overcomes ordinary ideological differences. This is especially true when there is broad agreement about the best policy to deal with the crisis. In this case, a grand coalition may occur even when one party has enough seats to govern alone. An example would be the British national governments during World War I and before and during World War II.

Another possibility is that the major parties may find they have more in common ideologically with each other than with the smaller parties. This is often a result of a cordon sanitaire, where the mainstream parties of the left and right form a coalition to keep parties of the far left or far right out of government. One such example is Austria, which had grand coalitions from 1945 to 1966 to this effect. It is also possible that so many parties are represented in parliament that no other coalition is stable. This is often done out of political necessity, to prevent an early election. For example, the fragmentation and intransigence of some of the smaller parties in Israel has made it easier to maintain a coherent platform with a grand coalition than with a narrow one.

== Selected cases ==
=== Africa ===
==== Tunisia ====
Ennahda Party made an alliance with the parties of opposing political ideologies, and governed Tunisia between 2011 and 2021. After the party won the Constituent Assembly election in 2011, an alliance was established with the second-placed party (Congress for the Republic) and the third-placed party (Ettakatol), forming the Troika alliance. In the 2014 parliamentary election, the party came in second place, but it formed alliance with Nidaa Tounes which was in first place, despite the tensions in the electoral campaign. In the 2019 parliamentary election, the party returned to first place and allied with the Heart of Tunisia party, until the 2021 political crisis.

==== South Africa ====
The 2024 elections in the Republic of South Africa resulted in the African National Congress (ANC), which had been in power since 1994, losing its majority having received less than 41% of the national vote. The ANC formed a grand coalition with the Democratic Alliance (previously the official opposition) and nine other parties. Together the parties had 72% of seats in the South African Parliament. All parties who were prepared to sign a statement of intent, which contained the main principles for what it called the Government of National Unity (GNU), were included.

=== America ===
==== Mexico ====
Concurrent with the 2012 change in executive power in which Enrique Peña Nieto, candidate of the former mexican state party Partido Revolucionario Institucional, has been elected, representatives of all mayor mexican political parties from the right Partido Accion Nacional to the left leaning Partido de la Revolucion Democratica, the aformentioned PRI and others, signed a pact to facilitate the governance and smooth return of the PRI after 12 years of "democratic transition". The legislative funtionally turned into a block that passed highly polemic reforms that were denounced as "back-alley accords" rather than the result of democratic imput.

=== Asia ===
==== India ====
In the Indian state of Maharashtra, the Maha Vikas Aghadi alliance was formed between the Indian National Congress, the Nationalist Congress Party (NCP) and the Shiv Sena after the 2019 Maharashtra Legislative Assembly election. While the Congress and the NCP reflect centre to centre-left policies and have a secular ideology, the Shiv Sena reflects right-wing policies and has a Hindu-nationalist ideology. The alliance formed the government in Maharashtra after a political crisis. The government lasted for 2.5 years, after which in 2022 a rebellion occurred in Shiv Sena regarding the alliance and another political crisis followed. After the government collapsed, the Shiv Sena split into two factions; the relatively moderate and secular group Shiv Sena (Uddhav Balasaheb Thackeray) (SS (UBT)) led by Uddhav Thackeray and the Balasahebanchi Shiv Sena, the Hindu nationalist group led by Eknath Shinde. The alliance still exists between the Congress, the NCP and the SS (UBT), though they sit in the opposition in the Maharashtra Legislative Assembly.

==== Israel ====
Israel has had several grand coalition governments. The first was the wartime government of Levi Eshkol, formed in 1967 and which lasted until 1970. Subsequent grand coalitions were formed in the 1980s and at several points in the 21st century. Several of Israel's grand coalitions were rotation governments, in which the premiership alternated between center-left and center-right leaders. The first was from 1984 to 1988, led by Shimon Peres and Yitzhak Shamir (which was continued as a non-rotation grand coalition until 1990). In 2021, a rotation grand coalition government, the Bennett-Lapid government, succeeded another rotation grand coalition in the form of the Netanyahu-Gantz government.

==== Japan ====
Following the 1993 Japanese general elections, the historically hegemonic Liberal Democratic Party (LDP) was narrowly placed into the opposition in the lower house for the first time in its history. The former opposition, consisting of parties ranging from the Japan Socialist Party (JSP) to the neoconservative Japan Renewal Party, united around Morihiro Hosokawa as their choice for prime minister. After having passed electoral reform legislation, which was the coalition's raison d'être, the bickering between ideological factions led to the grand coalition falling apart less than a year later. Soon afterwards, in 1994, the JSP negotiated with the LDP to form a grand coalition government. This lasted until January 1996, and the JSP collapsed after losing much of its political support.

==== Malaysia ====
The Pakatan Harapan coalition and the Barisan Nasional coalition formed the first grand coalition government in Malaysia in 2022, after the country's 15th general election. No major coalition secured enough seats in these elections to secure a simple majority in parliament. Thus, the country had a hung parliament for the first time in its history. A few days after the election, the Conference of Rulers decreed that party leaders must work together to form a government. Pakatan Harapan's Prime Minister candidate, Anwar Ibrahim, was sworn in as the country's 10th Prime Minister after securing the support of Barisan Nasional, its longstanding opponent, together with other parties that make up the Borneo Bloc: Gabungan Parti Sarawak (GPS), Gabungan Rakyat Sabah (GRS) and Warisan. This coalition government is commonly referred to as a Unity Government, even in official communication by the government itself, but this is not a commonly accepted use of the term. A Unity Government is typically defined as a broad coalition government that lacks opposition. In Malaysia's case, the Perikatan Nasional coalition serves as the biggest group in the opposition bloc.

==== Mongolia ====
Following the election, the ruling Mongolian People's Party had been reduced from Supermajority to simple majority for the first time in 8 years. Although The Mongolian People's Party could have formed a government of their own, the party leaders of Mongolian People's Party, Democratic Party (Mongolia) and HUN Party met and signed a memorandum to cooperate, thus a Grand Coalition in Mongolia is formed for the first time in its history.

==== Turkey ====
Turkey's first grand coalition was formed after the 1961 general election, with members of Republican People's Party and Justice Party. At the same time, the grand coalition was also Turkey's first coalition government.

=== Europe ===
==== Austria ====
Social Democratic Party of Austria

Austrian People's Party

In post-war Austria, a "grand coalition" (German: Große Koalition) between the Social Democratic Party of Austria (SPÖ) and the conservative Austrian People's Party (ÖVP) has been standard since World War II. Of the 31 governments which have taken office since 1945, 20 have been grand coalitions, including eleven consecutively from 1945 to 1966. Grand coalitions again governed from 1987 to 2000 and 2007 to 2017. Grand coalitions have also been common at the state level: as of July 2020, grand coalitions governed Carinthia, Styria, Lower Austria, and Upper Austria; in the last two of these, grand coalitions (more specifically, all-party government) are compulsory under the constitution.

==== Croatia ====
The Third Government of the Republic of Croatia (Croatian: Treća Vlada Republike Hrvatske), or the Government of National Unity (Croatian: Vlada nacionalnog jedinstva), was the Croatian government cabinet led by Prime Minister Franjo Gregurić. It was announced on 17 July 1991 in response to the escalation of the Croatian War of Independence. It was the 3rd cabinet of Croatia since the first multi-party elections, and its term ended on 12 August 1992 after the first parliamentary election under the 1990 Croatian Constitution. During the term of this cabinet Croatia gained internationally diplomatic recognition and became a member of the United Nations. The government was dominated by the right-wing Croatian Democratic Union and contained the Social Democratic Party of Croatia, Croatian Social Liberal Party, Croatian People's Party, Croatian Christian Democratic Party, Socialist Party of Croatia, Social Democrats of Croatia, and the Croatian Democratic Party

==== Czech Republic ====
After the Velvet Revolution, there was a government of socialists (ČSSD) with Prime Minister Miloš Zeman supported by the right-wing ODS, known as the opposition agreement.

==== Denmark ====
After the 2022 Danish general election a grand coalition was formed between the centre-left Social Democrats, the centre-right Venstre and the centrist Moderates, presided over by the social democrat Mette Frederiksen.

==== European Union ====
In the European Parliament, the two main political groups are the European People's Party (EPP) and the Socialists & Democrats (S&D). Until 2019, they held a majority in the European Parliament and worked together in a grand coalition. However, advances by green, liberal and right-wing populist parties across Europe in the 2019 European Parliament election led to the EPP-S&D coalition losing their majority, making Renew Europe support necessary to give Ursula von der Leyen and her commission a majority in the European Parliament.

==== Estonia ====
Kaja Kallas' first cabinet was a grand coalition between the Reform Party and the Centre Party. Kallas dismissed the Centre ministers from her cabinet in June 2022, leaving it in a minority.

==== Germany ====
Social Democratic Party of Germany

Christian Democratic Union

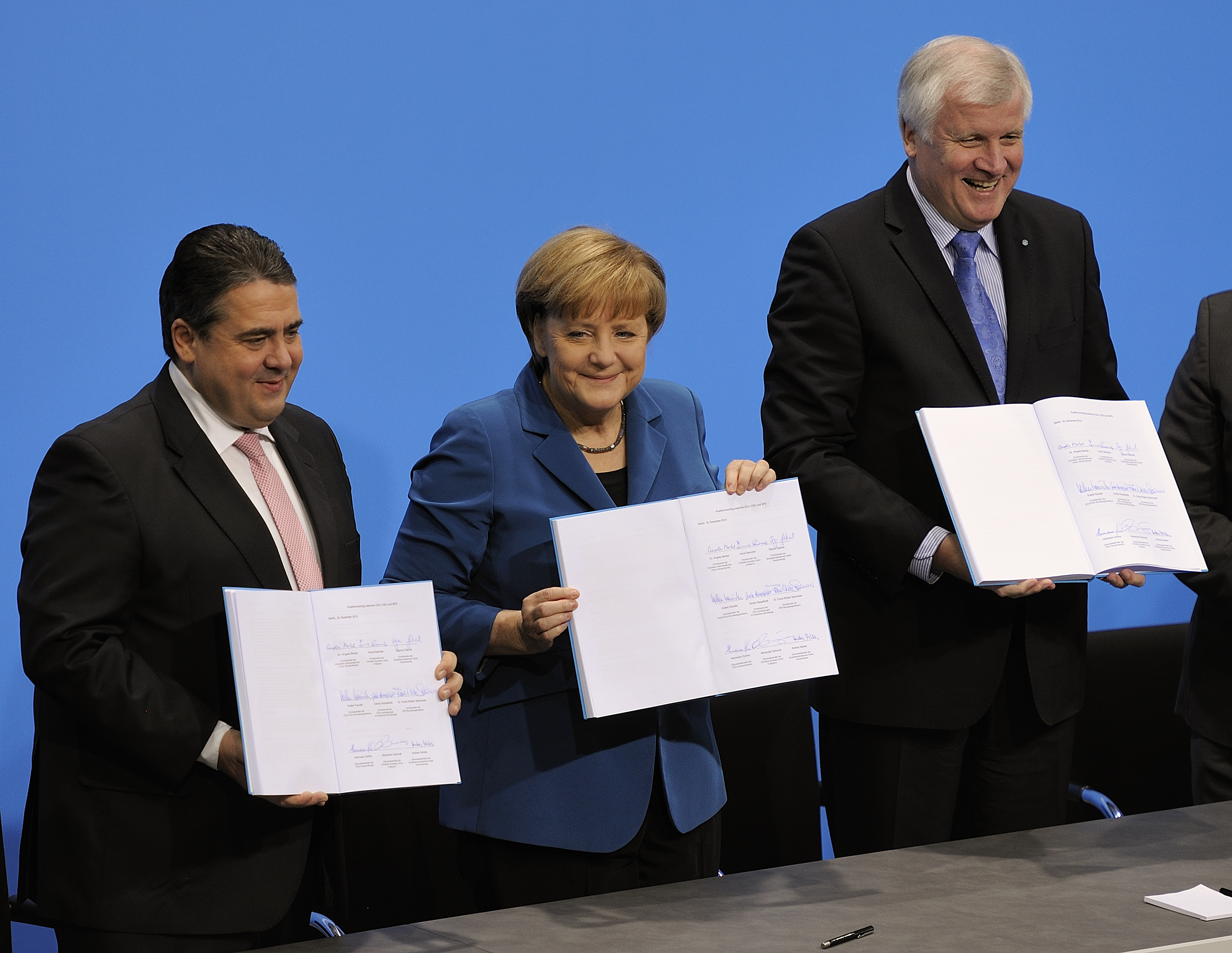
Sigmar Gabriel (SPD), Angela Merkel (CDU) and Horst Seehofer (CSU) presenting the 2013 coalition agreement for Germany's third Merkel cabinet

In post-war Germany, "grand coalition" (German: Große Koalition) refers to a governing coalition of the two largest parties, usually the Christian Democrats (CDU/CSU) and the Social Democrats (SPD). Under the Weimar Republic, the Great Coalition included all of the major parties of the left, centre, and centre-right who formed the basis of most governments: the SPD, the Catholic Centre Party, the German Democratic Party (DDP), and the German People's Party (DVP). The two examples were the first and second Stresemann cabinets (August–November 1923) and, less ephemerally, the second Müller cabinet (1928–1930). While West Germany and re-unificated Germany has historically tended to favour narrow coalitions of one of the two largest parties with the FDP or with the Greens, four grand coalitions have been formed at a federal level: the Kiesinger cabinet (1966–1969), the first Merkel cabinet (2005–2009), the third Merkel cabinet (2013–2018), and the fourth Merkel cabinet (2018–2021). A fifth coalition government, the Merz cabinet (2025–present), is dubbed as the "black-red coalition" due to the SPD falling behind the second-placed AfD after the 2025 German federal election.

==== Greece ====
In Greece there had been two Grand Coalitions known in Greece as National Unity Governments. The first one is the Coalition Cabinet of Xenophon Zolotas composed by the right-wing New Democracy (Greece) and the left-wing PASOK and Synaspismos because of a hung parliament and the second one is the Cabinet of Lucas Papademos composed by the right-wing New Democracy and Popular Orthodox Rally and the left-wing PASOK because of the Greek government-debt crisis. There were also grand coalitions during the governments of Tzannis Tzannetakis (New Democracy and Synaspismos), Antonis Samaras (New Democracy, PASOK and Democratic Left (Greece)) and Alexis Tsipras (Syriza, Independent Greeks and Ecologist Greens).

==== Iceland ====
In Iceland there was a grand coalition between 30 November 2017 and December 2024 between the largest parties of the centre-right Independence Party (16), the left-wing Left-Green Movement (9), and the liberal agrarian Progressive Party (8). All of the parties are opposed to EU integration. The coalition collapsed into a minority government after the Left-greens exited the coalition.

==== Italy ====
In the early decades of the Kingdom of Italy, there were several coalition governments between the Historical Right and the Historical Left, the two major Political factions. The First Italian Republic was characterised by Christian Democracy (DC) as the de facto ruling party and its coalition's leitmotiv being impeding the Italian Communist Party (PCI) from entering the Italian government. During the 1970s, in order to establish the political rotation (Italian: alternanza politica) common to most Western countries and within the context of a PCI that appeared to overtake the DC as the most voted and largest party, the DC leader Aldo Moro and the PCI secretary Enrico Berlinguer formed a political accommodation agreement where the PCI would give external support in exchange for influence in the government. Ultimately, the agreement, which was the closest thing to a grand coalition between the two largest parties, was ended after the kidnapping and murder of Moro and the PCI never entered the government.

A grand coalition was formally established during the early decades of the Second Italian Republic and within the context of Italy coming from the Great Recession and the Monti government (a technocratic government) after the resignation of Silvio Berlusconi in 2011, as well as austerity policies, in turn giving rise to the Five Star Movement (M5S), which resulted in a hung parliament after the 2013 Italian general election. As a result, the ensuing supermajority government was described as a grand coalition (Italian: grande coalizione), and was officially known as governo di larghe intese (lit. 'government of broad understanding', meaning 'government of broad agreements, 'broad-based coalition government', or 'broad-coalition government'), although it included five parties rather than only the two largest groups in the Italian Parliament. It was formed in April 2013 between the centre-left Democratic Party (PD), the centre-right The People of Freedom (PdL) party, and the centrist Civic Choice (SC), Italian Radicals (RI), and Union of the Centre (UdC) parties.

In November 2013, the PdL (later renamed as Forza Italia) dropped out and broke apart, leaving the government led by Enrico Letta and subsequently the Renzi government (a coalition between the PD, SC, RI, and UdC, with the addition of the New Centre-Right, which was composed of former PdL members who rejected the withdrawal of the new Forza Italia founded by Silvio Berlusconi after the PdL's dissolution, and the centre-right Populars for Italy) with a small majority. Despite the PdL's withdrawal from the majority, Matteo Renzi and Berlusconi signed the Nazareno Pact for a series of agreed reforms, such as the electoral law and a constitutional reform, which lasted until the 2015 Italian presidential election of Sergio Mattarella.

==== Liechtenstein ====
The Patriotic Union and the Progressive Citizens' Party have often governed Liechtenstein together, including the entire period from 1938 to 1997.

==== Luxembourg ====
In Luxembourg, towards the end of World War I, a new Chamber of Deputies was elected in 1918 with the explicit aim of reviewing the constitution. To this end, formalised parties were formed by the main political blocs, so as to increase their bargaining power in the negotiations. The revisions to the constitution introduced universal suffrage and compulsory voting, adopted proportional representation, and limited the powers of the monarch. Since the foundation of the party system, only one cabinet (between 1921 and 1925) has included only members of a single party. Most of the time, governments are grand coalitions of the two largest parties, no matter what their ideologies; this has made Luxembourg one of the most stable democracies in the world. Two cabinets (between 1945 and 1947) included members of every party represented in the Chamber of Deputies.

==== Netherlands ====
In the Netherlands, there have been several cabinets which can be described as grand coalitions. The Roman/Red coalitions of the 1940s and 1950s under Prime Minister Willem Drees were composed of the Christian democratic Catholic People's Party (KVP) and the social-democratic Labour Party (PvdA) at its core and several smaller parties as backup (Drees–Van Schaik). The purple coalitions (paars kabinet) in the 1990s under Prime Minister Wim Kok were between the PvdA, the conservative liberal People's Party for Freedom and Democracy (VVD) and the social-liberal Democrats 66 (D66) party (First Kok cabinet). The Second Rutte cabinet, a grand coalition cabinet which can also be described as a purple coalition, was composed of the VVD and the PvdA. A more traditional grand coalition cabinet was the Third Lubbers cabinet, comprising the Christian-democratic Christian Democratic Appeal (CDA) and the PvdA.

==== Portugal ====
In the 1983 legislative elections, the Socialist Party (PS) made a post-electoral agreement with the Social Democratic Party (PSD), creating a single large government coalition called the Central Bloc that lasted until 1985.

==== Romania ====
National Liberal Party PNL, Social Democratic Party PSD

After the political crisis in autumn 2021, PNL, PSD and the UDMR reached an agreement to rule the country together for the next seven years. Thus, it has been agreed that the prime minister and several other important ministries should be changed every 18 months. The prime minister appointed was national-liberal Nicolae Ciucă. His cabinet was sworn in on 25 November. The coalition supports the Romanian President Klaus Iohannis.

==== Spain ====
In Spain, the term "grand coalition" is typically used to refer to any hypothetical government formed between the centre-right to right-wing People's Party (PP) and the centre-left Spanish Socialist Workers' Party (PSOE). No such a coalition government has ever been formed at the national level, though it was proposed by then Prime Minister Mariano Rajoy during the 2015–2016 government formation process. Rajoy's own investiture on 29 October 2016 was allowed by the abstention of PSOE's MPs, in what was dubbed a "covert grand coalition", in reference to PSOE's tolerance of Rajoy's minority government through punctual agreements until the re-election of Pedro Sánchez as party leader in June 2017. At the regional level, grand coalitions between the two largest parliamentary forces have been rare, but examples exist:

- Basque Country: PNV–PSE, 1986–1990 and 1991–1998.
- Catalonia: PDeCAT/JxCat–ERC, 2016–2017 and 2018–2022.
- Navarre: UPN–PSN, 2011–2012.

Additionally, both PSOE and PP formed a joint coalition government—which also included other parties—following a successful vote of no confidence in the Cantabrian regional government of Juan Hormaechea in 1990, enduring until the 1991 regional election. At the time, however, the PP was not among the two largest political parties in the regional assembly.

==== Switzerland ====
Switzerland is a Directorial Republic, which means that the role of Head of State is collectively exercised by the Cabinet of Ministers, who are each elected by Parliament and whose chair is primus inter pares. The Federal Council consists of seven members who are elected by the Federal Assembly (both National Council and Council of States) in joint session, with the chair, the President of the Swiss Confederation, and the vice-president elected annually in rotation by Parliament in order of seniority—meaning that Switzerland actually has no Prime Minister and no member of the Federal Council is superior to another.

By constitutional convention since 1959, the "Magic Formula" (German: Zauberformel) allocates seats in the Federal Council to the four major parties represented in Parliament. Due to that, these major parties form a de facto perennial "grand coalition" or constant national unity government with a supermajority in both the National Council and the Council of States. This magic formula was adjusted after the Swiss People's Party (SVP) became the largest party represented in Parliament in the 2003 elections, transferring one seat in the Federal Council from the CVP to the SVP; however, the government's policies are only supported on a case-by-case basis by the parliamentary groups of the governing parties, so these major parties are in government and opposition at the same time.

Composition of Federal Assembly and Parliament (2023)
Party	Alignment	Seats in the National Council	Seats in the Council of States	Seats in the Federal Council
Swiss People's Party/Democratic Union of the Centre (SVP/UDC)	Right-wing	62 / 200	6 / 46	2 / 7
Social Democratic Party (SP)	Centre-left/left-wing	41 / 200	9 / 46	2 / 7
FDP.The Liberals (FDP)	Centre/centre-right	28 / 200	11 / 46	2 / 7
The Centre	Centre/centre-right	29 / 200	15 / 46	1 / 7
Total		160 / 200	41 / 46	7 / 7

==== United Kingdom ====
The UK has had grand coalitions in central government during periods of wartime. They are referred to as the "National Government".

===== Northern Ireland =====
The Northern Ireland Executive, the devolved administration of Northern Ireland, must by law, be a coalition of the largest Nationalist (also predominantly left of centre) and Unionist (also predominantly right of centre) parties. The chief post, of First Minister and deputy First Minister, is a diarchy. Most recently, this coalition has been led by Sinn Féin and the Democratic Unionist Party since the 2024 Northern Ireland Executive formation. All parties, major and minor, are offered posts in the executive, although they may opt to form an opposition.

===== Cayman Islands =====
The Cayman Islands, a British overseas territory, had a coalition between the largest parties, the centre-left People's Progressive Movement and centre-right Cayman Democratic Party, from 2017 through 2021. The coalition government ended after the 2021 Caymanian general election as a result of the collapse of the Democratic Party that year.

== See also ==
- Bipartisanship
- Cooperative games
- Cordon sanitaire
- Grand Coalition for Fiji
- Hung parliament
- National unity government
- Purple coalition
- Republicrat
- Uniparty
