= 2023 Nationalist Congress Party split =

Indian political incident

- Part of Politics of Maharashtra
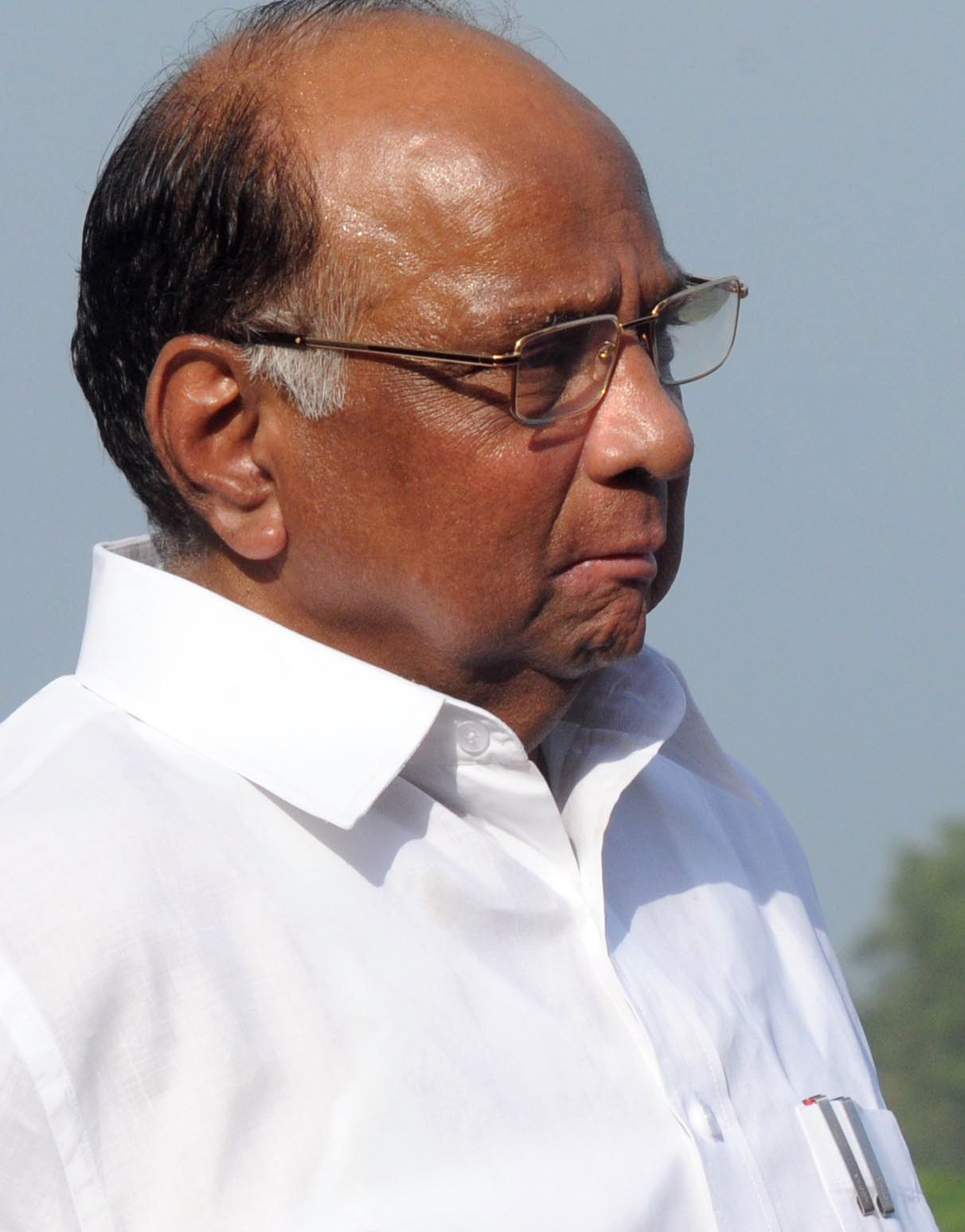
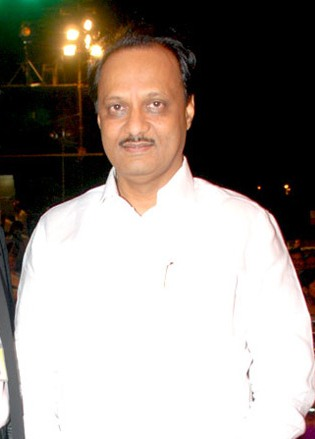
- Sharad Pawar, Ajit Pawar
- Date: 2 July 2023 – 7 February 2024
- Location: Mumbai, Maharashtra
- Outcome: Ajit Pawar took the oath as Deputy Chief Minister of Maharashtra; The Nationalist Congress Party split into two factions; Nine NCP MLAs took the oath as Cabinet Ministers in the Eknath Shinde‑led Government of Maharashtra; The Indian National Congress became the largest opposition party in the Maharashtra Legislative Assembly; Numbers by faction: Sharad Pawar camp in the Maharashtra Legislative Assembly; 12 / 53 (23%): Ajit Pawar camp in the Maharashtra Legislative Assembly; 41 / 53 (77%): Sharad Pawar camp in the Parliament of India; 7 / 9 (78%): Ajit Pawar camp in the Parliament of India; 2 / 9 (22%)
- Preceded by: 2022 Shiv Sena split

The 2023 Nationalist Congress Party (NCP) split occurred on 2 July 2023, when Ajit Pawar and several senior party leaders broke away from the NCP — led by his uncle Sharad Pawar — and joined the ruling Bharatiya Janata Party (BJP)–Shiv Sena alliance in Maharashtra. Ajit Pawar took the oath as Deputy Chief Minister of Maharashtra, and eight other NCP leaders were inducted as ministers. This led to a formal split within the party, resulting in two factions: one led by Sharad Pawar and the other by Ajit Pawar.

The split triggered a legal dispute over the party's name and its election symbol. On 6 February 2024, the Election Commission of India recognized the Ajit Pawar‑led faction as the official NCP and allotted it the party's name and symbol. The faction led by Sharad Pawar was subsequently referred to as the Sharad Pawar faction.

On 5 March 2024, Maharashtra Legislative Assembly Speaker Rahul Narwekar declared Ajit Pawar's group the official NCP, citing its majority in the legislature.

== Reasons behind the split ==
Ajit Pawar supported allying with the NCP's traditional opponent, the Bharatiya Janata Party (BJP), a move that Sharad Pawar publicly opposed. The NCP is commonly characterized as a centrist, secular, and inclusive political party, with a focus on social justice, federalism, and the welfare of farmers and marginalized communities. By contrast, the BJP is generally described as right‑leaning political party, emphasizing Hindu nationalism, Hindu cultural values, and economic liberalization. Ajit Pawar claimed that Sharad Pawar had previously considered forming an alliance with the BJP and that a number of NCP leaders were also in favor of aligning with the ruling party in Maharashtra. This ideological conflict prompted Ajit Pawar and his supporters to break away from the party.

The split was driven by ideological differences, political ambitions, and strategic disagreements. Ajit Pawar, who led the breakaway faction, cited the need for a different political alliance as the primary reason. Supriya Sule, a senior leader in the Sharad Pawar‑led faction, stated that the split was the result of ideological differences within the party and was not connected to personal disputes within the Pawar family.

Ajit Pawar's ambition to secure a higher political position was also a contributing factor to the split. Despite being a prominent leader within the NCP, he had long aspired to become Chief Minister of Maharashtra. However, he was unable to attain that position through alliances with parties like the Indian National Congress and Shiv Sena. Some observers suggest that Ajit Pawar believed Sharad Pawar's focus on promoting his daughter, Supriya Sule, limited his own prospects in the party. By aligning with the Bharatiya Janata Party (BJP) and the Eknath Shinde–led Shiv Sena, Ajit Pawar sought to expand his political influence and secure a significant role in the state government.

Ajit Pawar had also stated that Sharad Pawar had sent him to negotiate an alliance with the BJP on multiple occasions, only to withdraw later, placing him in a difficult position. He said that, in private, Sharad Pawar was open to allying with the BJP, but publicly opposed it, which he argued created uncertainty within the party. Ajit Pawar took the oath as Deputy Chief Minister with the BJP in November 2019, but resigned soon after Sharad Pawar changed his stance.

Internal dissent within the NCP was further fueled by differing views on the party's future direction and alliances. While Sharad Pawar and his allies preferred to maintain the Maha Vikas Aghadi (MVA) arrangement, Ajit Pawar and his supporters argued that a new alignment with the BJP would better serve their political goals and the party's influence in Maharashtra.

=== Allegations of Central Agency pressure ===
Some political observers and opposition leaders alleged that investigations by central agencies such as the Enforcement Directorate (ED) against Nationalist Congress Party leaders contributed to the party's 2023 split. They claim that ongoing probes may have influenced some NCP leaders to join the ruling alliance. For example, senior NCP leaders including Ajit Pawar, Praful Patel, and Hasan Mushrif were under ED investigation for various cases when they switched sides. NCP leader Sharad Pawar suggested that some leaders joined the government to avoid investigations. Leaders who switched sides denied these allegations, stating that their decisions were based on developmental issues rather than investigative pressure.

== Timeline ==
- 3 April 2023: Two meetings took place:
  - Sharad Pawar convened a meeting of senior NCP leaders to discuss the election strategy.
  - Ajit Pawar held a separate meeting with other leaders to discuss concerns about pressure from central agencies and the party's future leadership.
- Mid-May 2023: Ajit Pawar and Praful Patel began discussions with the BJP high command, facilitated by Devendra Fadnavis.
- 30 June 2023: A final meeting of NCP leaders intending to defect finalized the plan to join the Shinde–Fadnavis government.
- 2 July 2023: Ajit Pawar, along with eight other NCP leaders, was sworn in as a minister in the Eknath Shinde–led Maharashtra government, marking the official split in the party.
- 6 February 2024: The Election Commission awarded the party name and symbol to the faction headed by Ajit Pawar.
- 15 February 2024: Maharashtra Assembly Speaker Rahul Narwekar declared the Ajit Pawar faction the "real" NCP, citing its legislative majority.

== Split ==
Before Ajit Pawar was sworn in as Deputy Chief Minister, on 5 June 2023, Chief Minister Eknath Shinde and Deputy Chief Minister Devendra Fadnavis met the Union Home Minister Amit Shah in Delhi and announced that the cabinet would be expanded. Praful Patel attended an opposition meeting in Patna with Supriya Sule instead of Sharad Pawar, Ajit Pawar's uncle and the national president of the NCP.

On 2 July 2023, Ajit Pawar went to Raj Bhavan in Mumbai and took the oath as Deputy Chief Minister, along with NCP leaders including Praful Patel, Chhagan Bhujbal, Dilip Walse-Patil, Dhananjay Munde, Hasan Mushrif, Dharamrao Aatram, Aditi Tatkare, and Sanjay Bansode. All seven NCP MLAs from Nagaland supported Ajit Pawar.

On 6 February 2024, Ajit Pawar’s faction was officially recognised as the real NCP by the Election Commission, granting his faction the party’s poll symbol and name. The Election Commission directed Sharad Pawar’s camp to adopt a new name for the upcoming 2024 general elections.

Number of NCP members by leader
| Leaders | MLA | Lok Sabha MPs | MLC |
|---|---|---|---|
| Sharad Pawar | 15 | 4 | 3 |
| Ajit Pawar | 40 | 1 | 9 |
| Total number of members of NCP before split | 55 | 5 | 11 |

=== MLAs of the NCP ===
| Sr No. | Ajit Pawar | Sr No. | Sharad Pawar |
|---|---|---|---|
| 1 | Aditi Tatkare | 1 | Ashok Pawar |
| 2 | Dharamrao Aatram | 2 | Anil Deshmukh |
| 3 | Ajit Pawar | 3 | Balasaheb Patil |
| 4 | Anil Patil | 4 | Nilesh Lanke |
| 5 | Anna Bansode | 5 | Jayant Patil |
| 6 | Ashutosh Kale | 6 | Chandrakant Nawghare |
| 7 | Atul Benke | 7 | Jitendra Awhad |
| 8 | Babasaheb Patil | 8 | Mansingh Naik |
| 9 | Babanrao Shinde | 9 | Dr Rajendra Shingne |
| 10 | Balasaheb Ajabe | 10 | Prajakt Tanpure |
| 11 | Chhagan Bhujbal | 11 | Rajesh Tope |
| 12 | Dattatraya Bharane | 12 | Rohit Pawar |
| 13 | Daulat Daroda | 13 | Sandeep Kshirsagar |
| 14 | Dhananjay Munde | 14 | Suman Patil |
| 15 | Dilip Bankar | 15 | Sunil Bhusara |
| 16 | Dilip Mohite | | |
| 17 | Dilip Walse-Patil | | |
| 18 | Dipak Chavan | | |
| 19 | Hasan Mushrif | | |
| 20 | Indranil Naik | | |
| 21 | Kiran Lahamate | | |
| 22 | Makrand Patil | | |
| 23 | Manikrao Kokate | | |
| 24 | Manohar Chandrikapure | | |
| 25 | Narhari Sitaram Zirwal | | |
| 26 | Chetan Tupe | | |
| 27 | Nitin Pawar | | |
| 28 | Prakashdada Solanke | | |
| 29 | Nawab Malik | | |
| 30 | Rajesh Patil | | |
| 31 | Raju Karemore | | |
| 32 | Sanjay Bansode | | |
| 33 | Saroj Ahire | | |
| 34 | Sangram Jagtap | | |
| 35 | Shekhar Nikam | | |
| 36 | Sunil Tingre | | |
| 37 | Sunil Shelke | | |
| 38 | Yashwant Mane | | |
| 39 | Rupali Chakankar | | |
| 40 | Suraj Chavan | | |
| 41 | Amol Mitkari | | |
| 42 | Aniket Tatkare | | |
| 43 | Ananda Paranjape | | |

=== Lok Sabha MPs of the NCP ===
| Sr No. | Ajit Pawar | Sr No. | Sharad Pawar |
|---|---|---|---|
| 1 | Sunil Dattatray Tatkare | 1 | Supriya Sule |
| | | 2 | Amol Kolhe |
| | | 3 | Shriniwas Patil |
| | | 4 | Mohammed Faizal Padippura |

=== Rajya Sabha MPs of the NCP ===
| Sr No. | Ajit Pawar | Sr No. | Sharad Pawar |
|---|---|---|---|
| 1 | Praful Patel | 1 | Sharad Pawar |
| | | 2 | Fouzia Khan |
| | | 3 | Vandana Chavan |

== See also ==
- 2019 Maharashtra political crisis
- 2022 Maharashtra political crisis
