= Mahayuti =

Indian political alliance

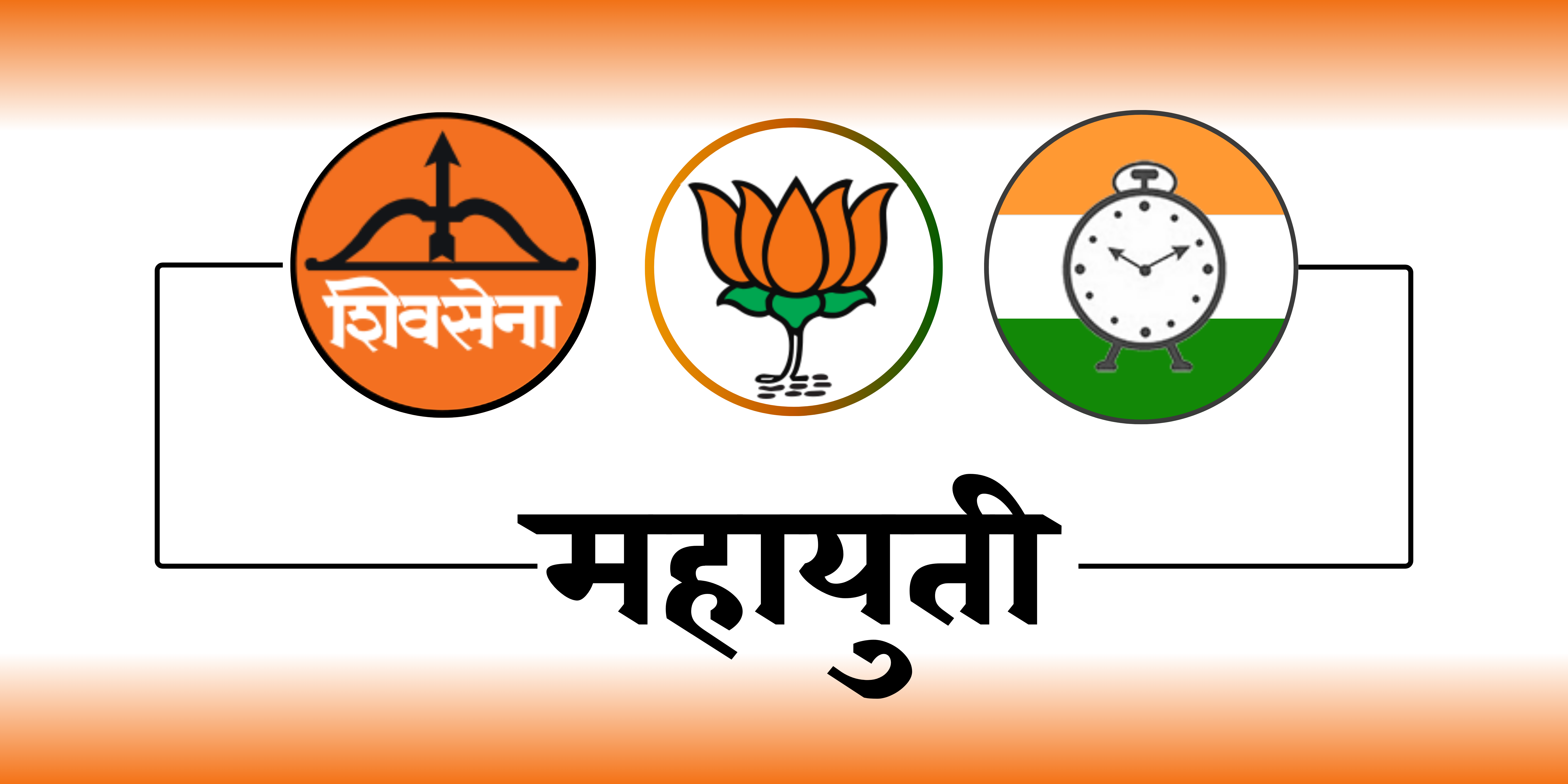
- Abbreviation: MY
- Leader: Devendra Fadnavis (Chief Minister) Eknath Shinde (Deputy Chief Minister) Sunetra Pawar (Deputy Chief Minister)
- President: Devendra Fadnavis
- Chairperson: Chandrakant Patil
- Founders: Devendra Fadnavis; Uddhav Thackeray; Amit Shah
- Founded: 4 December 2014; 11 years ago
- Ideology: National conservatism; Right-wing populism; Factions: Hindutva; Secularism (Indian); Hindu nationalism
- Political position: Big tent
- National affiliation: NDA
- Colours: Saffron
- Rajya Sabha: 15 / 19
- Lok Sabha: 30 / 48
- Seats in Maharashtra Legislative Council: 61 / 78
- Seats in Maharashtra Legislative Assembly: 260 / 288
- Politics of India; Political parties; Elections; A: The Alliance is described as a broad big tent alliance, with centre-right, far-right factions and centrist factions

The Mahayuti (transl. Grand Alliance; abbreviated as MY), formed in 2014, is a political coalition in Maharashtra, India. Currently the alliance consists of three major parties — Bharatiya Janata Party, Shiv Sena and Nationalist Congress Party – along with Republican Party of India (Athawale), Rashtriya Samaj Paksha and others.

The BJP-Shiv Sena partnership was particularly significant, as the two parties shared a long-standing ideological affinity. The alliance aimed to consolidate their combined strength by leveraging Shiv Sena's regional influence and the BJP's national appeal.

Under the Maha Yuti banner, the alliance achieved several notable successes, including winning the 2014 Maharashtra Assembly elections and securing 41 out of 48 Lok Sabha seats in the state. However, internal tensions and disagreements over power-sharing led to Shiv Sena's departure in 2019.

The alliance was revived in 2022 following the dissolution of the Maha Vikas Aghadi government, resulting in a faction of Shiv Sena joining Maha Yuti alliance and forming the Government with Eknath Shinde from the rebel Shiv Sena (2022–Present) sworn in as the chief minister and BJP's Devendra Fadnavis as deputy chief minister. later in year 2023 the NCP faction broke with one remaining in MVA while Ajit Pawar led faction joined MahaYuti Government with Ajit Pawar swearing in as second deputy chief minister of Maharashtra. The MY alliance got a huge setback in 2024 Lok Sabha Polls where it could only secure 17 out of 48 seats losing 24 sitting seats.

The MahaYuti won the 2024 Maharashtra Legislative Assembly election in a landslide, securing 235 seats. Two independents also lent support to the alliance, extending its tally to 237. Following the election, Bharatiya Janata Party leader Devendra Fadnavis was sworn in as the chief minister and Shiv Sena's Eknath Shinde and Ajit Pawar were sworn in as deputy chief minister of Maharashtra.

On 28 January 2026, Ajit Pawar died in a plane crash accident after which his wife Sunetra Ajit Pawar sworn in as the Deputy Chief Minister on 31 January 2026. Currently she serves alongside Eknath Shinde.

== Current members ==
- Note: MPs in the Rajya Sabha And Lok Sabha only include those from Maharashtra seats

Party	Symbol	Maharashtra Legislative Assembly	Maharashtra Legislative Council	Lok Sabha	Rajya Sabha
Bharatiya Janata Party		132 / 288	36 / 78	9 / 48	8 / 19
Shiv Sena		57 / 288	13 / 78	13 / 48	2 / 19
Nationalist Congress Party		41 / 288	9 / 78	1 / 48	4 / 19
Jan Surajya Shakti		2 / 288	0 / 78	0 / 48	0 / 19
Rashtriya Samaj Paksha		1 / 288	0 / 78	0 / 48	0 / 19
Rajarshi Shahu Vikas Aghadi		1 / 288	0 / 78	0 / 48	0 / 19
Rashtriya Yuva Swabhiman Party		1 / 288	0 / 78	0 / 48	0 / 19
Republican Party of India (Athawale)		0 / 288	0 / 78	0 / 48	1 / 19
Independents		2 / 288	3 / 78	0 / 48	0 / 19
Total		237 / 288	61 / 78	23 / 48	15 / 19

== Electoral Performance ==
=== Lok Sabha Election ===
Year	Seats won	+/-	Voteshare (%)	+/- (%)	Popular vote
2024	17 / 48	▼24	43.55%	▼7.79%	24,812,627

=== Maharashtra Assembly Election Results ===
Year	Seats won	+/-	Voteshare (%)	+/- (%)	Popular vote	Status
2024	237 / 288	▲94	49.30%	▲7.14%	31,849,405	Government

=== List of Lok Sabha members ===
#	Constituency	Name	Party
1	Jalgaon	Smita Wagh	BJP
2	Buldhana	Prataprao Jadhav	SHS
3	Nagpur	Nitin Gadkari	BJP
4	Raigad	Sunil Tatkare	NCP
5	Hatkanangle	Dhairyasheel Mane	SHS
6	Thane	Naresh Mhaske	SHS
7	Kalyan	Shrikant Shinde	SHS
8	Aurangabad	Sandipan Bhumre	SHS
9	Mumbai North-West	Ravindra Waikar	SHS
10	Mumbai North	Piyush Goyal	BJP
11	Ratnagiri-Sindhudurg	Narayan Rane	BJP
12	Satara	Udayanraje Bhosale	BJP
13	Raver	Raksha Khadse	BJP
14	Pune	Murlidhar Mohol	BJP
15	Akola	Anup Dhotre	BJP
16	Palghar (ST)	Hemant Savara	BJP
17	Maval	Shrirang Barne	SHS
18	Mumbai North East	Sanjay Dina Patil	SHS
19	Shirdi (SC)	Bhausaheb Rajaram Wakchaure	SHS
20	Yavatmal-Washim	Sanjay Deshmukh	SHS
21	Osmanabad	Omprakash Raje Nimbalkar	SHS
22	Hingoli	Nagesh Bapurao Patil Ashtikar	SHS
23	Parbhani	Sanjay Jadhav	SHS

=== List of Rajya Sabha members ===
#	Name	Party	Term start	Term end
1	Vinod Tawde	BJP	03-Apr-2026	02-Apr-2032
2	Maya Ivnate	BJP	03-Apr-2026	02-Apr-2032
3	Ramrao Wadkute	BJP	03-Apr-2026	02-Apr-2032
4	Medha Kulkarni	BJP	03-Apr-2024	02-Apr-2030
5	Ashok Chavan	BJP	03-Apr-2024	02-Apr-2030
6	Ajit Gopchade	BJP	03-Apr-2024	02-Apr-2030
7	Dhananjay Mahadik	BJP	05-Jul-2022	04-Jul-2028
8	Anil Bonde	BJP	05-Jul-2022	04-Jul-2028
9	Parth Pawar	NCP	03-Apr-2026	02-Apr-2032
10	Praful Patel	NCP	03-Apr-2024	02-Apr-2030
11	Nitin Patil	NCP	28-Aug-2024	04-Jul-2028
12	Sunetra Pawar	NCP	21-Jun-2024	04-Jul-2028
13	Jyoti Waghmare	SHS	03-Apr-2026	02-Apr-2032
14	Milind Deora	SHS	03-Apr-2024	02-Apr-2030
15	Ramdas Athawale	RPI(A)	03-Apr-2026	02-Apr-2032

== Status in Municipal Corporations ==
Alliance wise status
Municipal Corporation	Seats	Ruling Party	Last election

Pune Municipal Corporation
