= 2022 Shiv Sena split =

Indian political incident

- Part of Politics of Maharashtra
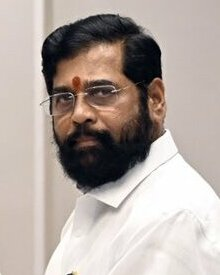
- Eknath Shinde (left), Uddhav Thackeray (right)
- Date: 21–30 June 2022 (9 days)
- Location: Mumbai, Maharashtra Guwahati, Assam Surat, Gujarat Panaji, Goa
- Type: Parliamentary political crisis
- Cause: Eknath Shinde's move to Surat, Gujarat and then to Guwahati, Assam with several MLAs
- Motive: To break the Maha Vikas Aghadi and reestablish BJP-Shiv Sena alliance
- Target: Maha Vikas Aghadi
- Participants: Maha Vikas Aghadi (MVA); Other political parties and Independents
- Outcome: Resignation of Uddhav Thackeray as Chief Minister of Maharashtra; Fall of Maha Vikas Aghadi; Government formation under leadership of Eknath Shinde and Devendra Fadnavis; Shiv Sena splits into 2 parties: Shiv Sena (Uddhav Balasaheb Thackeray) (led by Uddhav) and Balasahebanchi Shiv Sena (led by Shinde).; Balasahebanchi Shiv Sena faction was recognized as the main Shiv Sena after the Election Commission of India recognized this faction as the original Shiv Sena on 17 February 2023.
- Preceded by: 2019 Maharashtra political crisis
- Followed by: 2023 Nationalist Congress Party split

The 2022 Shiv Sena (SHS) split began on 21 June 2022 in the Indian state of Maharashtra when Eknath Shinde, along with several other MLAs of the Maha Vikas Aghadi (MVA) coalition moved to Surat in the Bharatiya Janata Party (BJP)-governed Gujarat, throwing the coalition into a crisis.

The group later moved to Guwahati in another BJP-governed state, Assam. Shiv Sena leader Sanjay Raut accused BJP of causing the revolt within Shiv Sena and attempting to topple the MVA-coalition government, implicitly mentioned later in a remark by BJP's Sushil Modi. Eknath Shinde led a revolt against Uddhav Thackeray because he disagreed with Thackeray's decision not to end the alliance with Maha Vikas Aaghadi, despite requests from two-thirds of elected Shiv Sena members. Shinde's faction ultimately succeeded in taking control of the party and forming a new government in Maharashtra with the support of the BJP.

On 29 June, Uddhav Thackeray, Chief Minister of Maharashtra, resigned from the post while speaking live on social media ahead of a no-confidence motion on 29 June 2022. The resignation of Thackeray saw the cancellation of the floor test, with Shinde taking stake of the government as the Chief Minister and Devendra Fadnavis as the Deputy Chief Minister on 30 June.

A Supreme Court judgement on 11 May 2023 stated that then Maharashtra governor Bhagat Singh Koshiyari and then Maharashtra Assembly speaker Rahul Narwekar did not act as per the law, but the Uddhav Thackeray government cannot be restored due to Uddhav's resignation which led to cancellation of floor test.

== Background ==
Seat share of Maharashtra Legislative Assembly election 2019 BJP (105), SS (56), NCP (54), INC (44), BVA (3), AIMIM (2), PJP (2), SP (2), KSP (1), PWP (1), SSS (1), RSP (1), JSS (1), CPI(M) (1), MNS (1), Ind. (13)

In the 2019 Maharashtra Legislative Assembly elections, Bharatiya Janata Party (BJP) and Shiv Sena (SHS) contested the election jointly under the alliance Mahayuti. Indian National Congress (INC) and Nationalist Congress Party (NCP) fought under the alliance Maha Aghadi.

BJP won 105 seats, Shiv Sena won 56 seats, NCP won 54 seats and INC won 44 seats. After the declaration of results of the Maharashtra elections, differences arose between Shiv Sena and BJP on the power-sharing arrangement. Shiv Sena demanded an equal share in power which was allegedly agreed upon by the BJP, (which BJP leaders including Amit Shah had denied publicly). Shiv Sena demanded the post of Chief Minister for 2.5 years according to alleged 50-50 agreement. The incumbent CM from BJP, Devendra Fadnavis denied any such formula had been agreed upon. BJP eventually ended up breaking ties with one of their oldest allies, Shiv Sena. Shiv Sena then declined to support BJP to form the government. The 2019 Maharashtra political crisis ensued.

Eventually Shiv Sena joined the Maha Aghadi alliance of INC and NCP to form the Maha Vikas Aghadi (MVA) alliance with a combined seat count of 154 seats where 145 seats were needed for majority. The MVA alliance decided to form the government under the leadership of Uddhav Thackeray as the Chief minister.

Eknath Shinde was in favour of breaking the Maha Vikas Aghadi and reestablishing the BJP-Shiv Sena coalition. He requested Uddhav Thackeray to break the alliance and his request was ignored on multiple occasions. He gathered 2/3rd members from his party to support his request and 2022 Maharashtra political crisis started.

== Cross voting in Rajya Sabha and Legislative Council elections ==
On 10 June 2022, the infighting in the party was highlighted for the first time when BJP won 3 out of 6 seats in the Rajya Sabha elections. On 20 June 2022, out of 10 seats going for Maharashtra Legislative Council elections, Shiv Sena and its allies were expected to win 6 seats, however they only won 5. BJP won the other 5 seats, reportedly due to cross-voting by several Shiv Sena members.

== Crisis ==
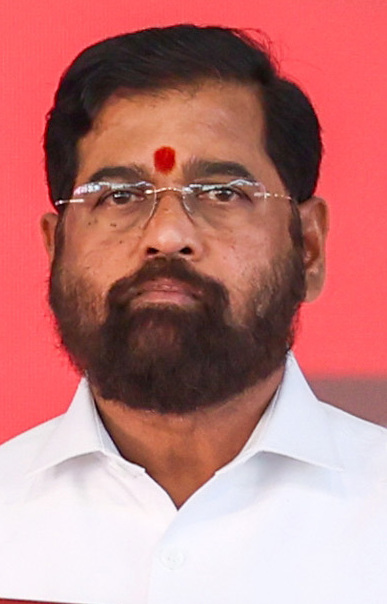
Leader of Rebel Shiv Sena Camp, Eknath Shinde

=== Initial Breakout ===
Immediately after the Legislative council election results, Eknath Shinde, a senior Shiv Sena leader, disappeared and could not be contacted. On 21 June 2022, a meeting was called by Uddhav Thackeray with all his MLAs, but 10-12 MLAs were also unreachable. 11 MLAs of Shiv Sena, led by Shinde, flew to Surat city, in the BJP governed state of Gujarat. Shinde was removed from the post of the Shiv Sena party whip. Shinde removed the word Shiv Sena from his Twitter profile. In his hotel in Surat he had several meetings with the BJP leaders.

To prevent further loss of MLAs, Shiv Sena housed the rest of its MLAs in several hotels in Mumbai. Soon Shinde claimed that he commanded the support of "nearly 40 MLAs". Shinde required support of 37 MLAs (two-thirds of the total strength of 55) to avoid being disqualified under the Anti-defection laws in India. Shinde demanded Thackeray break the Maha Vikas Aghadi and re-join the alliance with the BJP.

=== Stay at Guwahati ===
On 22 June, Shinde said that he had moved 40 legislators to Guwahati, Assam. Several INC and NCP leaders criticized Himanta Biswa Sarma, CM of Assam, for interfering in Maharashtra politics instead of focusing on the massive flood in Assam. Sarma denied the knowledge of Shinde and his stay with the other rebel MLAs in Guwahati.

After failing to convince Shinde to return to Mumbai, on 22 June, Uddhav Thackeray, Chief Minister of Maharashtra, declared that he was ready to step down as the leader of the alliance and as Chief Minister. Later that day, Uddhav Thackeray moved from the residence of the CM Varsha to his private residence, Matoshree.

Senior Shiv Sena leader Sanjay Raut accused the BJP of causing the revolt within Shiv Sena and attempting to topple the MVA coalition government. The leadership of Shiv Sena has accused the BJP of bribing nearly ₹40 crore (US$4.2 million) to each its lawmakers for creating the mutiny. Shiv Sena MLA Udaysingh Rajput said that he was offered ₹50 crore (US$5.2 million) in cash to join the rebel group but he declined.

On 23 June, Shinde and 37 MLAs declared Shinde leader of the Shiv Sena legislature party. On 24 June, Shiv Sena filed a petition against the rebel MLAs and demanded the Deputy speaker Narahari Zirwal of the Maharashtra Assembly to disqualify 16 MLAs of the Shinde camp. Zirwal met with Shiv Sena leaders and later also met with the Advocate General of Maharashtra for legal opinion. Both Thackeray and Shinde camp leaders were asked to present their arguments about the disqualification. A no-confidence motion against Zirwal was brought by two independent MLAs supporting BJP. This no-confidence vote, signed by 34 MLAs was rejected by Zirwal reportedly because the petition was sent through an anonymous e-mail and not submitted by an MLA himself.

On the same day, Eknath Shinde, Home minister Amit Shah and former chief minister Devendra Fadnavis met in Vadodara, Gujarat, reportedly to plan a merger or coalition to topple the MVA government. The office of a rebel Shiv Sena leader was allegedly vandalized by members of the Shiv Sena.

On 26 June, Eknath Shinde moved to the Supreme Court of India to dispute the rejection of the no-confidence vote against the Deputy speaker, and challenge the disqualification plea against 16 of them. According to Shiv Sena at least 20 MLAs in Shinde's camp were communicating with Chief Minister Uddhav Thackeray. Some of them did not support merging the breakaway group with the BJP.

On 27 June, during the hearing in the Supreme Court of India, the court directed the Deputy speaker to postpone the next hearing to 11 July to give time to the rebel MLAs. It also asked Deputy Speaker Zirwal to file a detailed affidavit about the no-confidence motion against him. During the hearing, when asked about the rebels approach to the Bombay High Court, the rebel counsel responded that "Threats to us and our families make it non-conducive to pursue cases in Mumbai."

=== Resignation of Uddhav Thackeray ===
On 28 June, Devendra Fadnavis met Governor of Maharashtra Bhagat Singh Koshyari and demanded a motion of no confidence against Uddhav Thackeray. On 29 June, Koshiyari ordered a trust vote motion to be held and the assembly strength of the government be proven by 30 June. Shiv Sena immediately moved to the Supreme court against this order. On the same day, the supreme court refused to stay the no-confidence motion and ordered it to be conducted the next day on 30 June stating that “The floor of the House is the only way to settle all issues.” A few hours later, Uddhav Thackeray resigned from the post of Chief Minister of Maharashtra while addressing on social media.

On 17 February 2023, the Electoral Commission allotted the name Shiv Sena and the party symbol of bow and arrow to Eknath Shinde's faction. This officially concluded the political crisis and officially defined Eknath Shinde as the sole leader of Shiv Sena.

== Formation of new government ==
On 30 June, Shinde and Fadnavis staked the claim to form the government and declared Eknath Shinde Chief Minister of Maharashtra. Fadnavis at the press conference declared that the majority party, BJP, would sit out and support the government under Shinde but would not be part of the government. This led to reactions, with the BJP President JP Nadda requesting him to take charge as the Deputy Chief Minister of the state and become part of the government. Later that day Eknath Shinde and Devendra Fadnavis took oath as the Chief Minister and Deputy Chief Minister of Maharashtra respectively.

=== Composition ===
Members of Maharashtra Legislative Assembly by their political party (as of 1 July 2022):

Alliance	Party	No.of MLAs	Leader of the Party
Government; National Democratic Alliance; Seats: 167	BJP	106	Devendra Fadnavis
Government; National Democratic Alliance; Seats: 167	SHS	40	Eknath Shinde
Government; National Democratic Alliance; Seats: 167	BVA	3	Hitendra Thakur
Government; National Democratic Alliance; Seats: 167	PJP	2	Bachchu Kadu
Government; National Democratic Alliance; Seats: 167	RSP	1	Ratnakar Gutte
Government; National Democratic Alliance; Seats: 167	JSS	1	Vinay Kore
Government; National Democratic Alliance; Seats: 167	MNS	1	Pramod Ratan Patil
Government; National Democratic Alliance; Seats: 167	PWPI	1	Shyamsundar Shinde
Government; National Democratic Alliance; Seats: 167	IND	12	-
Opposition United Progressive Alliance, Maha Vikas Aghadi; Seats: 116	NCP	53	Jayant Patil
Opposition United Progressive Alliance, Maha Vikas Aghadi; Seats: 116	INC	44	Balasaheb Thorat
Opposition United Progressive Alliance, Maha Vikas Aghadi; Seats: 116	SHS (UBT)	16	Ajay Choudhari
Opposition United Progressive Alliance, Maha Vikas Aghadi; Seats: 116	SWP	1	Devendra Mahadevrao Bhuyar
Opposition United Progressive Alliance, Maha Vikas Aghadi; Seats: 116	CPI(M)	1	Vinod Bhiva Nikole
Opposition United Progressive Alliance, Maha Vikas Aghadi; Seats: 116	IND	1	-
Others; Seats: 04	AlMIM	2	Mohammed Ismail Abdul Khalique
Others; Seats: 04	SP	2	Abu Asim Azmi
Vacant		1	
Total		288	

== Supreme Court verdict ==
A Supreme Court judgement on 11 May 2023 termed the actions of then Maharashtra governor Bhagat Singh Koshiyari and the assembly Speaker Rahul Narwekar during the crisis as illegal. According to the judgement, the governor called for floor test without receiving any communication from the rebel Shiv Sena MLAs about their withdrawal of support of Uddhav Thackeray government. The court also said that Eknath Shinde faction cannot be labeled as "split" and are liable to be disqualified as MLAs for defection.

Further, the judgement stated that it cannot reinstate Uddhav Thackeray government because Uddhav resigned without facing the floor test at that time. Had Uddhav not resign from his chief minister post, his government could have been reinstated.

== Uddhav Thackeray ministry ==
- 2023 Maharashtra political crisis
