= Patra Chawl scam =

Financial fraud case in Mumbai

The Patra Chawl scam was an alleged financial fraud case in Mumbai, India, involving the redevelopment of Patra Chawl (Siddharth Nagar) in Goregaon. The case centers around irregularities in a redevelopment project initiated in 2008, leading to investigations by the Enforcement Directorate (ED) for money laundering.

== Background ==
Patra Chawl, spread over 47 acres, housed 672 tenant families. In 2008, the Maharashtra Housing and Area Development Authority (MHADA) awarded a redevelopment contract to Guru Ashish Construction Pvt Ltd (GACPL), a subsidiary of Housing Development and Infrastructure Limited (HDIL).

== Scam ==
The Patra Chawl scam involves allegations against Guru Ashish Construction Pvt Ltd (GACPL), a subsidiary of Housing Development and Infrastructure Limited (HDIL). The redevelopment project, initiated by the Maharashtra Housing and Area Development Authority (MHADA) in 2008, aimed to rehabilitate 672 tenant families and construct additional flats for MHADA. GACPL is accused of misleading MHADA, selling Floor Space Index (FSI) to nine developers for Rs 901.79 crore, and failing to construct the promised flats.

The Enforcement Directorate launched a money laundering probe based on an FIR filed by Mumbai Police's Economic Offences Wing (EOW). Investigations revealed that Pravin Raut, a former director of GACPL, diverted Rs 95 crore for personal use, including acquiring land parcels and gifting properties. The ED estimates the total proceeds of crime at Rs 1,039.79 crore.

== Key figures involved ==
Key figures involved include Pravin Raut, former director of GACPL, and Sanjay Raut, a Shiv Sena (UBT) leader. The ED initiated a money laundering probe based on an FIR filed by Mumbai Police's Economic Offences Wing. Developments include asset attachments worth Rs 116.27 crore by ED and ongoing court proceedings.

== Impact ==
The scam has left 672 families without homes promised in the redevelopment project and has led to political controversies about corruption in Mumbai's real estate development.
