= Politics of Maharashtra =

Indian state politics

Maharashtra is India's third largest state by area and has over 112 million inhabitants. Its capital, Mumbai, has a population of approximately 18 million; Nagpur is Maharashtra's second, or winter, capital. Government in the state is organized on the parliamentary system. Power is devolved to large city councils, district councils (zilla parishad), subdistrict (taluka) councils, and village parish councils (gram panchayat). The numerically strong Maratha–Kunbi community dominates the state's politics. The state has national and regional parties serving different demographics, such as those based on religion, caste, and urban and rural residents.

The Congress party dominated state politics for many years after the formation of the state in 1960. In recent decades, however, splits within the Congress party, and the rise of Shiv Sena and the BJP has made politics of the state more competitive. Like in other states of India, Maharashtra also has political families dominating their respective areas, and not averse to switching parties if that maintains their power.

The politics of the state in the last few years has seen long term alliances breaking up like that of undivided Shivsena and BJP, new ones being formed between Congress, NCP, and the Shivsena, regional parties like the Shivsena and NCP splitting up, and majority of their legislators joining a new alliance government with the BJP.

== Government structure ==
=== State government ===
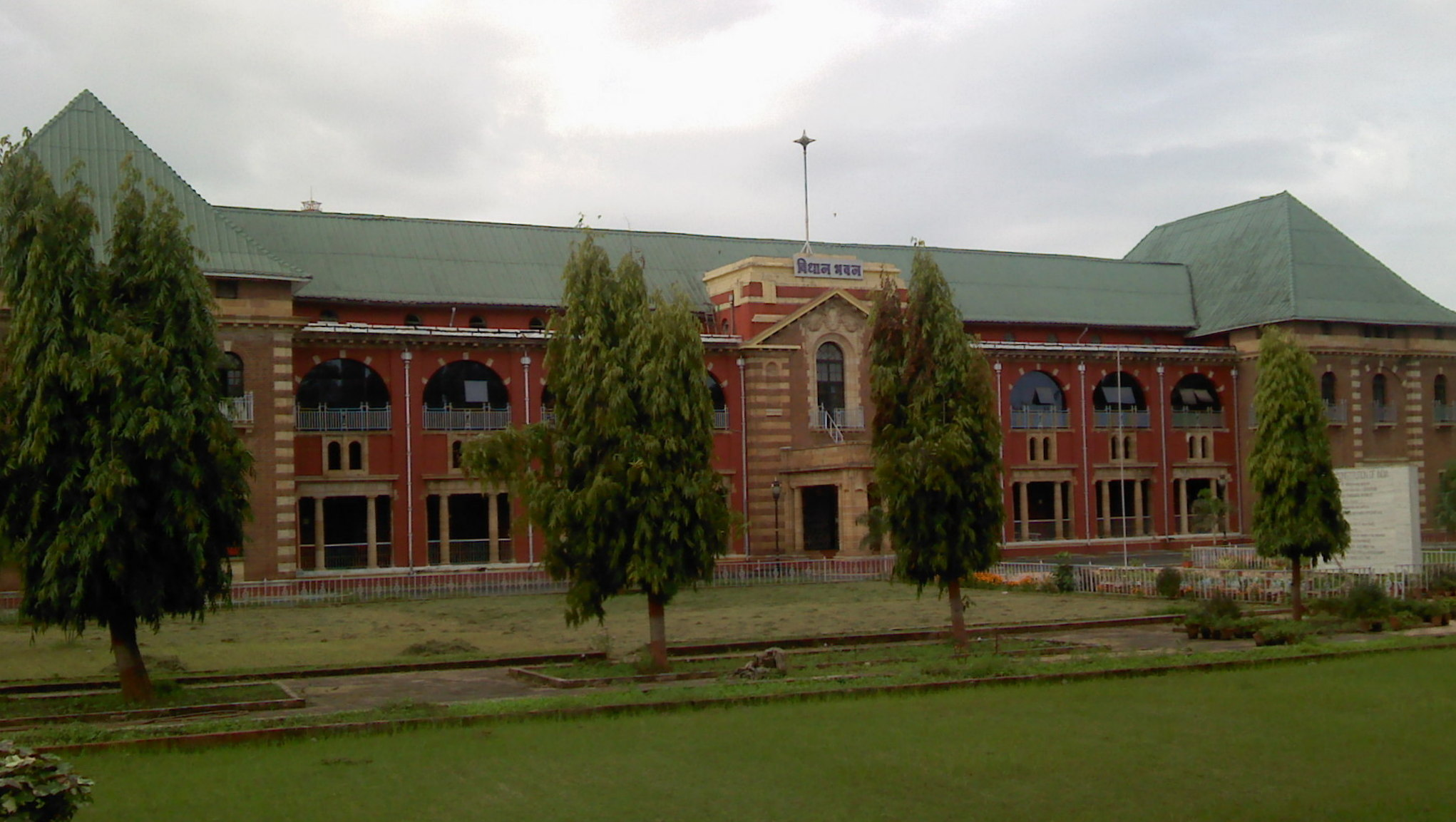
Vidhan Bhavan (State Legislative Assembly), Nagpur. The Assembly meets here for the winter session.

The Government of Maharashtra is conducted within a framework of parliamentary government, with a bicameral legislature consisting of the Maharashtra Legislative Assembly and the Maharashtra Legislative Council.

The Legislative Assembly (Vidhan Sabha) is the lower chamber and consists of 288 members. 25 and 29 seats are reserved for the Scheduled Castes and Scheduled Tribes and others, respectively. Members are elected for a five-year term by a first-past-the-post voting electoral system.

The Legislative Council (Vidhan Parishad) is the upper chamber and is a permanent body of 78 members. Members are elected indirectly in the following manner:

- One third are elected by the members of local bodies such as municipalities, gram panchayats, panchayat samitis, and district councils.
- One third are elected by the members of the Legislative Assembly from among the persons who are not members of the Legislative Assembly.
- One sixth are nominated by the governor from persons having knowledge or practical experience in fields such as literature, science, arts, the co-operative movement, and social services.
- One twelfth are elected by persons who are graduates of three years' standing residing in that state.
- One twelfth are elected by teachers who have spent at least three years teaching in educational institutions within the state not lower than secondary schools, including colleges and universities.

The government is headed by the chief minister, who is chosen by the party or alliance with a majority of members in the Legislative Assembly. The chief minister and the council of ministers drive the legislative agenda and exercise most of the executive powers. However, the constitutional and formal head of the state is the governor, who is appointed for a five-year term by the president of India on the advice of the union government.

=== Maharashtra in Indian Parliament ===
Maharashtra elects members to both chambers of the Indian Parliament. Representatives to India's lower chamber, the Lok Sabha, are elected by an adult universal suffrage in a first-past-the-post system to represent their respective constituencies. They hold their seats for five years, or until the body is dissolved by the president on the advice of the council of ministers. Representatives to India's upper chamber, the Rajya Sabha, are elected indirectly by the Vidhan Sabha members. Maharashtra elects 48 of the 543 Lok Sabha members and 19 of the 233 Rajya Sabha members.

=== Local government ===
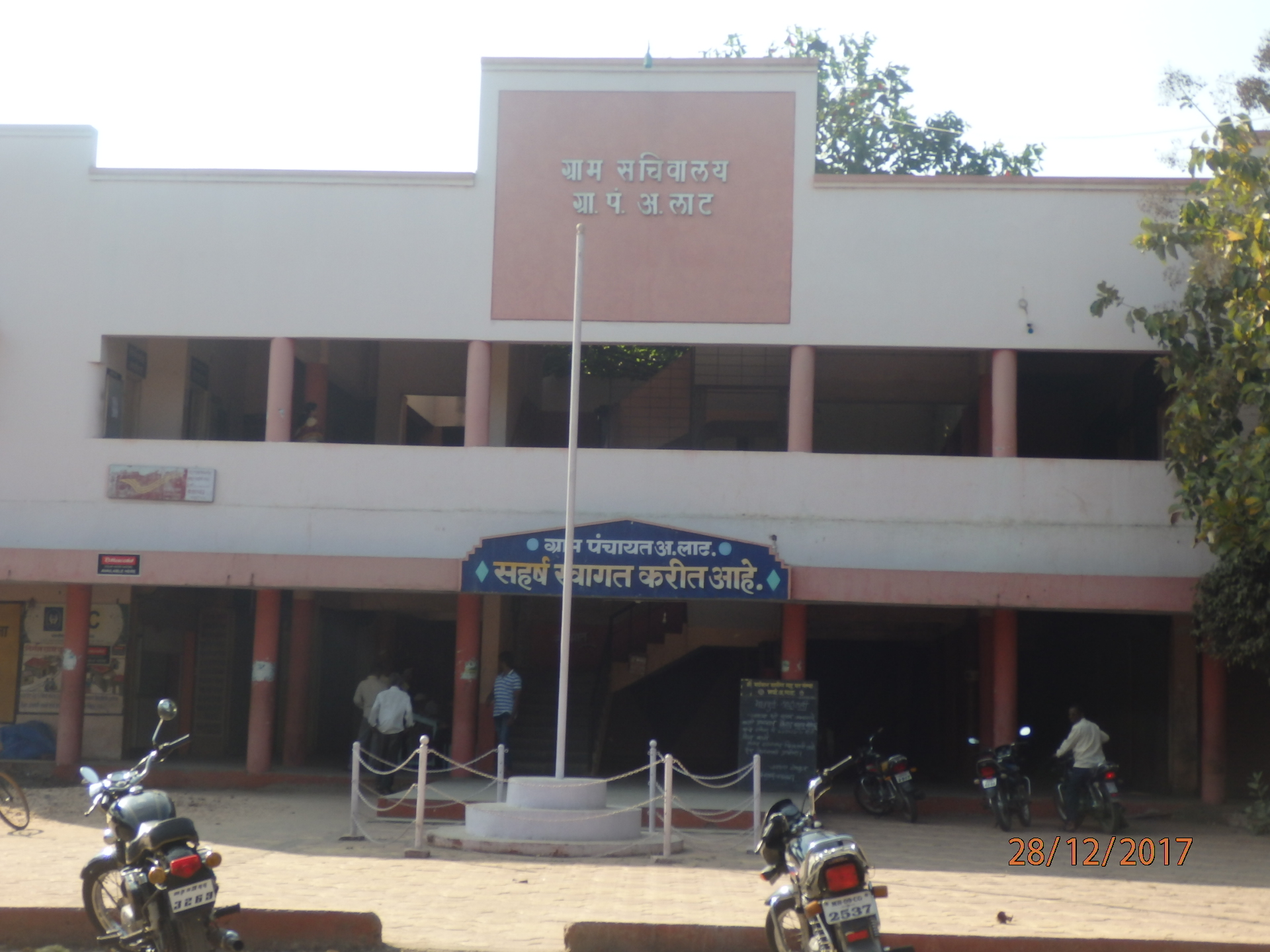
A gram panchayat office in an Abdul Lat village, Kolhapur district

The state has a long tradition of compelling planning bodies at district and local levels. Local self-governance institutions in rural areas include 34 zilla parishads (district councils), 355 taluka panchayat samitis (district subdivision councils), and 27,993 gram panchayats (village councils). Urban areas in the state are governed by 27 municipal corporations, 222 municipal councils, four nagar panchayats, and seven cantonment boards. Although Maharashtra had gram panchayat with elected members since 1961, the 73rd Amendment to the Indian Constitution (1993) put in place a statutory requiring 33% of seats on the panchayats be reserved for women, the scheduled castes, and the scheduled tribes. In addition, 33% of the sarpanch (panchayat chief) positions were also reserved for women. Although the amendment boosted the number of women leaders at the village level, there have been cases of harassment by male members of the panchayat towards the female members of the organizations.

The administration in each district is headed by a district collector, who belongs to the Indian Administrative Service and is assisted by several officers belonging to Maharashtra state services. The Superintendent of Police—an officer belonging to the Indian Police Service and assisted by the officers of the Maharashtra Police service—maintains law and order in addition to other related issues in each district. The Divisional Forest Officer—an officer belonging to the Indian Forest Service—manages the forests, environment, and wildlife of the district, assisted by the officers of Maharashtra Forest Service and Maharashtra Forest Subordinate Service. Sectoral development in the districts is looked after by the district head of each development department, such as Public Works, Health, Education, Agriculture, and Animal Husbandry.

Administrative Divisions in India

Republic of India
States	Union Territories
Divisions
Districts or Zilla
District Sub-divisions (Tehsils/Talukas)	Municipal Corporations (Maha-Nagar-Palika)	Municipalities (Nagar-Palika)	City Councils (Nagar-Panchayat)
Villages (Gram/Gaon)	Wards

== Political parties and alliances ==
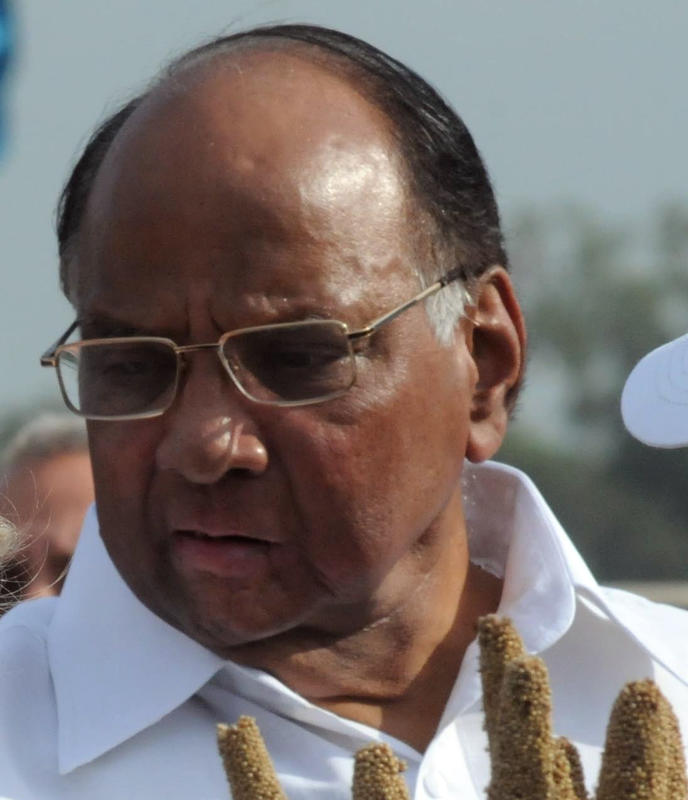
Sharad Pawar, a dominant political figure of Maharashtrian politics for more than forty years

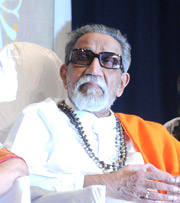
Bal Thackeray, founder of Shiv Sena

The Indian National Congress (INC) party dominated the politics of Maharashtra for many decades since the state's inception in 1960, as well as its predecessor of Bombay State. Maharashtra became a bastion of Congress party stalwarts such as Yashwantrao Chavan, Vasantdada Patil, Vasantrao Naik, and Shankarrao Chavan.

Sharad Pawar has been a significant personality in state and national politics for nearly fifty years. During his career, he has split Congress twice, with important consequences for state politics. After his second parting from the Congress party in 1999, Pawar formed the Nationalist Congress Party (NCP) but joined a Congress-led coalition to form the state government after the 1999 Assembly elections.

The Congress party enjoyed nearly unchallenged dominance of the state political landscape until 1995, when the coalition of Shiv Sena and the Bharatiya Janata Party (BJP) secured an overwhelming majority in the state, beginning a period of coalition governments. Shiv Sena was the larger party in the coalition. From 1999 until 2014, the NCP and INC formed one coalition while Shiv Sena and the BJP formed another for three successive elections, which the INC–NCP alliance won. Prithviraj Chavan of the Congress party was the last chief minister of Maharashtra under the Congress–NCP alliance that ruled until 2014.

These alliances broke down over seat allocations for the 2014 Assembly election. In the election, the most seats (122) went to the BJP, who initially formed a minority government under Devendra Fadnavis. Still, in December 2014, Shiv Sena entered the government and provided a comfortable majority in the Assembly to the Fadnavis-led government.

In the 2019 Lok Sabha elections, the BJP and Shiv Sena fought under the NDA banner, whereas the Congress and NCP were part of the UPA. The two alliances remained intact for the Legislative Assembly elections in October 2019.The BJP and Shiv Sena gained the majority of seats in the Assembly but could not form a government due to squabbles between the two parties.The BJP–Shiv Sena alliance ended in early November 2019, with Shiv Sena subsequently forming a new partnership with its longtime rivals, the NCP and Congress, to form the new state government on 28 November 2019. In June 2022, this government collapsed when the majority of the Shiv Sena legislative party, under Eknath Shinde, broke away to form a new coalition with the BJP.

In 2024 Assembly elections, BJP led Maha Yuti won a landslide.

Other parties in the state include the All India Forward Bloc, the Maharashtra Navnirman Sena, the Communist Party of India, the Peasant and Workers Party, the All India Majlis-e Ittihad al-Muslimin, the Bahujan Vikas Aaghadi, the Samajwadi Party, various factions of the Dalit-dominated Republican Party of India, the Bahujan Samaj Party, and the Socialist Party.

== Dominant groups in Maharashtra politics ==
After the state of Maharashtra was formed on 1 May 1960, the INC was long without a significant challenger. The party also enjoyed overwhelming support from the state's influential sugar cooperatives, as well as thousands of other cooperatives, such as rural agricultural cooperatives involved in the marketing of dairy and vegetable produce, cooperative banks, and credit unions.

For the better part of the late-colonial and early post-independence periods in Bombay State and its successor, Maharashtra State, the politics of the state have been dominated by the mainly rural Maratha–Kunbi caste, which accounts for 31% of the population of Maharashtra. They dominated the cooperative institutions, and, with the resultant economic power, controlled politics from the village level to the State Legislative Assembly and the Lok Sabha.

In 2016, of the 366 total members of the Legislative Assembly (MLAs) (the Legislative Assembly had 288 MLAs and the Legislative Council had 78), 169 (46%) were Marathas.Also 26 out of 48 loksabha members from Maharashtra belonged to this group. Major past political figures of the Congress party from Maharashtra—such as Keshavrao Jedhe, Yashwantrao Chavan, Vasantdada Patil, Shankarrao Chavan, Vilasrao Deshmukh, and Sharad Pawar—have been from this group. Of the 19 chief ministers so far, as many as 10 (55%) have been Maratha. Since the 1980s, politicians from this group have also been active in setting up private educational institutions.

Following disputes between Sharad Pawar and the INC President, Sonia Gandhi, the state's political status quo was disturbed when Pawar defected from the INC, which was perceived as the vehicle of the Nehru–Gandhi dynasty, to form the Nationalist Congress Party. The Maratha community nevertheless dominates this offshoot of the Congress party.

Shiv Sena was formed in the 1960s by Balashaheb Thackerey, a cartoonist and journalist, to advocate and agitate for the interests of Marathi people in Mumbai. Over the following decades, Shiv Sena slowly expanded and took over the then-Mumbai Municipal Corporation in the 1980s. Although the original base of the party was among lower middle and working-class Marathi people in Mumbai and the surrounding suburbs, the party's leadership came from educated groups. However, since the 1990s there has been a shift in leadership, with many middle-level leaders creating personal fiefdoms for themselves and their families using strong-arm tactics. Hansen has termed this as the "dada-ization" of the party. By 2012, based on the number of Marathas elected on the Shiv Sena ticket in the previous few elections, the party was emerging as another Maratha party.

The BJP is closely related to the Rashtriya Swayamsevak Sangh (RSS) and is part of the Sangh Parivar. The party initially derived its support from the urban upper castes, such as Brahmins and non-Maharashtrians.Later on it also drew support from the non-maratha OBC communities. In recent years the party has penetrated the Maratha community by fielding Maratha candidates in elections. Since 2014 the BJP has emerged as the largest party in all assembly elections.

The BJP–Shiv Sena coalition came to power at the state level in 1995, which was a blow to the Congress party. In 2006, a split within Shiv Sena emerged when Bal Thackeray anointed his son Uddhav Thackeray as his successor over his nephew Raj Thackeray. Raj Thackeray then left the party and formed a new party called Maharashtra Navnirman Sena (MNS). Raj Thackeray, like his uncle, has also tried to win support from the Marathi community by embracing anti-immigrant sentiment in Maharashtra, for instance against Biharis.

The second-largest community after the Maratha–Kunbi is the former Mahar community, now known as Neo-Buddhist. The community falls under the scheduled caste (SC) group. Since the time of B. R. Ambedkar, this community has supported various factions of the Republican Party of India (RPI). There are 25 seats reserved for the SC. Parties such as NCP, BJP, and the Congress field candidates from other SC groups like Mang and Chambhar for the reserved seats to thwart the candidates of the RPI.

=== Nepotism and dynasticism ===
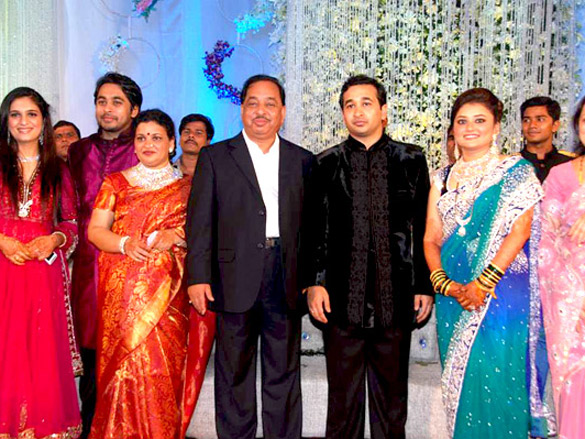
Long-standing Maharashtra politician, Narayan Rane, with his politician sons and other family members

Although a parliamentary democracy, Indian politics has increasingly become dynastic, possibly due to the absence of a party organization, independent civil society associations that mobilize support for the party, and centralized financing of elections. This practice is fairly common in all political parties in Maharashtra. On the national level, family members have led the Congress party for most of the period since 1978, when Indira Gandhi floated the then Congress (I) faction of the party. The ruling Bharatiya Janata Party also features several senior leaders who are dynasts.

In the 2019 elections to the Lok Sabha, 42% of MPs elected from Maharashtra belonged to political families. According to John Mohan Razu, parties mainly choose candidates from political families to maximize the party's chances at the ballot box. In most local cases, being a dynast remains more of an asset than a liability in the Indian context. The dynastic phenomenon is seen from the national level down to the district level and even at the village level. The three-tier structure of Panchayati Raj created in the 1960s also helped to create and consolidate this phenomenon in rural areas. Apart from the government, political families in the state also control cooperative institutions (mainly cooperative sugar factories), district cooperative banks, and in some cases local unions.

Sharad Pawar, the founder of the NCP, has many members of his family—including his daughter Supriya Sule and nephew Ajit Pawar—holding prominent positions in the party. Senior politicians promote their relatives in other state districts in their local quasi-fiefdoms. For example, in the Akluj area of Solapur district, candidates have to be from the Mohite-Patil clan or approved by them.

Journalist Gopal Joshi argues that ideology has taken a backseat in state politics with some dynastic families—such as the Vikhe Patil of Ahmadnagar district—making a journey from communism in the first generation to the rightwing BJP in the present generation. Although dynasticism is a powerful factor in the state politics, feuds amongst family members can lead to members launching their own parties, such as when Raj Thackeray left Shiv Sena and formed the Maharashtra Navnirman Sena.

== 2014 Assembly election ==
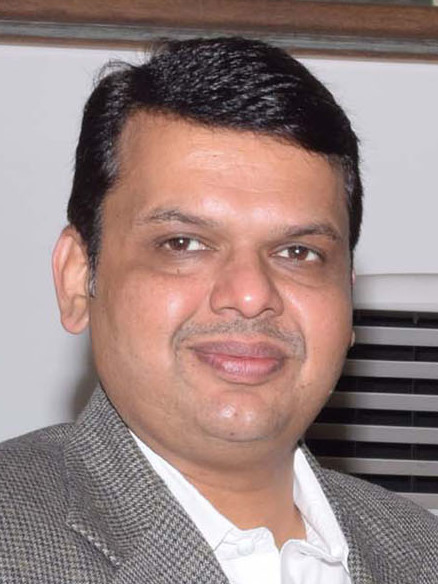
Devendra Fadnavis, Chief Minister of Maharashtra and former Deputy Chief Minister

The 2014 Assembly election followed the landslide national victory for the BJP in the 2014 Lok Sabha election, which saw Narendra Modi elected as Prime Minister. All major parties in the state (BJP, Shivsena, INC, and NCP) contested the elections independently, leading to a complex and much-contested election. The BJP put together an alliance of forward castes, the Other Backward Class (OBC), and, to some extent, Dalit to fight the Maratha-led Congress and NCP. The results were significant in that the BJP received the highest number of seats, despite being historically smaller than Shiv Sena in the state. Although the BJP still required Shiv Sena's support to form a majority, it progressed from being a minor party in state politics to the party of the chief minister, Devendra Fadnavis, who held that position until November 2019.

== 2019 Lok Sabha elections ==
In April 2019, voting for the 48 Lok Sabha seats from Maharashtra was held in four phases.

Despite their differences, the BJP and Shiv Sena once again contested the elections together under the National Democratic Alliance (NDA) banner. Similarly, the Congress and NCP had their seat-sharing arrangement. The breakaway party of Raj Thakeray, Maharashtra Navnirman Sena, did not contest any seats and instead urged their supporters to vote for the NCP–Congress alliance, with Thakeray campaigning for candidates belonging to these parties.

The election results on 23 May 2019 were another landslide victory for the NDA, with the BJP and Shiv Sena winning 23 and 18 seats, respectively, out of the total of the state's 48 Lok Sabha seats. The Congress party won only one seat in the state, whereas the NCP won five seats from its stronghold of western Maharashtra.

== 2019 Vidhan Sabha elections ==
The BJP–Shiv Sena and NCP–Congress alliances remained intact for the Vidhan Sabha (Legislative Assembly) elections in October 2019. The BJP and Shiv Sena gained the majority of seats in the Assembly but could not form a government due to squabbles between the two parties. The BJP, with 105 seats, was far short of the 145 seats required to form a majority, and declined to form a minority government. At the same time, Shiv Sena started talks with the NCP and Congress to form a government.

On 23 November 2019, BJP formed a government with support from NCP, with Ajit Pawar as Deputy Chief Minister. This government collapsed three days later, with Chief Minister Devendra Fadnavis and Ajit Pawar resigning their respective positions. On 28 November 2019, the governor swore in Uddhav Thackeray, the Shiv Sena chief, as the new chief minister of Maharashtra. Thackeray's governing coalition included Shiv Sena, NCP, INC, and several independent members of the Legislative Assembly.

== 2022 Shiv Sena split ==
In late June 2022, Eknath Shinde, a senior Shiv Sena leader, and the majority of MLAs from Shiv Sena, allied with the BJP. Governor Bhagat Singh Koshyari called for a trust vote, an action that would later on be described as a "sad spectacle" by Supreme Court of India and draw criticism from political observers. Uddhav Thackeray resigned his post as chief minister and MLC membership ahead of a no-confidence motion on 29 June 2022. Shinde subsequently formed a new coalition with the BJP, and was sworn in as the chief minister on 30 June 2022. BJP leader Devendra Fadnavis was given the post of Deputy Chief Minister in the new government.

Thackeray filed a lawsuit in Supreme Court of India claiming that Shinde and his group's actions meant that they were disqualified under anti-defection law. In response, Shinde claimed that he had not defected, but rather represented the true Shiv Sena party. The Supreme Court delivered its verdict in May 2023, noting that the Maharashtra Governor and Assembly Speaker did not act as per the law. However, the court said it could not order the restoration of the Uddhav Thackeray government as Thackeray resigned without facing a floor test following Shinde's move to depart Shiv Sena and split the party. In its verdict, the Supreme Court ordered the Maharashtra Assembly Speaker to decide the matter of disqualification of the 16 MLAs. Speaker Rahul Narwekar, after hearing petitions from both factions, gave his verdict on the matter on 10 January 2024, in which he declared the Shinde faction as the real Shiv Sena, and therefore entitled to the Shiv Sena party name and symbol.

== 2023 NCP split ==
In July 2023, NCP leader Ajit Pawar and several NCP State Assembly members joined the BJP–Shiv Sena government led by Eknath Shinde. Sharad Pawar, the founder of NCP, has condemned the move and expelled the rebels. Ajit Pawar received support from the majority of legislators and officeholders of the party. On 7 February 2024, The Election Commission Of India (ECI) awarded the party name and symbol to the faction headed by Ajit Pawar.The faction led by Sharad Pawar will be henceforth known as Nationalist Congress Party (SharadChandra Pawar)

== 2024 Indian general election ==
General election was held in India from 19 April to 1 June 2024 in seven phases, to elect all 543 members of the Lok Sabha including 48 in Maharashtra.The votes were counted and the results were declared on 4 June 2024.Unlike the 2019 general elections, this election was a contest between the NDA, and the newly formed INDIA grouping. The NDA in the state includes the BJP, the Shivsena under Eknath Shinde, and the NCP under Ajit Pawar.The INDIA grouping includes the INC, Shiv Sena (UBT) under Uddhav Thackeray, and the Nationalist Congress Party – Sharadchandra Pawar. The election was a heavy set back for the NDA, particularly for the BJP and the NCP under Ajit Pawar.The INDIA grouping won 30 seats, and the NDA 17 seats. Final tally of seats was BJP 9, Shiv Sena 7, NCP 1, Congress 13, Shiv Sena (UBT) 9, NCP (Sharadchandra Pawar) 8 and other 1.

== 2024 Vidhan Sabha elections ==
Although the INDIA grouping which includes the Mahavikas aghadi won a resounding victory in the 2024 Loksabha elections, the Vidhan sabha elections in November 2024 had the opposite result with the Mahayuti coalition of BJP, Shivsena (Shinde), and NCP( Ajit Pawar) winning 80% of the Vidhan sabha seats. In December 2024, Devendra Phadnavis became the chief minister of the mahayuti government with Eknath Shinde, and Ajit Pawar being appointed as deputy chief ministers.Election analysts have credited the Ladki Bahin Yojana that made cash transfers to women before the election as attracting a larger number of female voters to opt for the Mahayuti.Other factors cited aby analysts including greater participation by the RSS in ground level campaigning, continued popularity of Narendra Modi, and dog-whistle call for Hindu unity using slogans such as Batenge to katenge (divided we fall).

== See also ==
- 2004 Maharashtra Legislative Assembly election
- 2009 Maharashtra Legislative Assembly election
- Gram panchayat
- List of chief ministers of Maharashtra
- Panchayat Samiti
- Vanchit Bahujan Aaghadi
