= Shiv Sena (UBT) =

Political party in Maharashtra, India

Shiv Sena (Uddhav Balasaheb Thackeray)
- Abbreviation: SS (UBT)
- President: Uddhav Thackeray
- General Secretary: Aditya Thackeray
- Parliamentary Chairperson: Sanjay Raut
- Rajya Sabha Leader: Sanjay Raut
- Lok Sabha Leader: Arvind Sawant
- Founder: Uddhav Thackeray
- Founded: 10 October 2022 (4 years ago)
- Preceded by: Shiv Sena (1966–2022)
- Headquarters: Shivsena Bhavan, Dadar, Mumbai, Maharashtra
- Newspaper: Saamana
- Youth wing: Yuva Sena
- Ideology: Liberal conservatism Soft Hindutva Marathi nationalism
- Political position: Centre-right
- ECI status: State Party
- Alliance: INDIA (National Level); MVA (Maharashtra)
- Seats in Rajya Sabha: 1 / 245
- Seats in Lok Sabha: 3 / 543
- Seats in Maharashtra Legislative Council: 5 / 78
- Seats in Maharashtra Legislative Assembly: 20 / 288

Election symbol
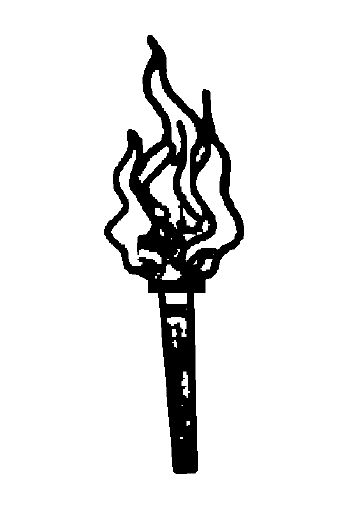

Party flag
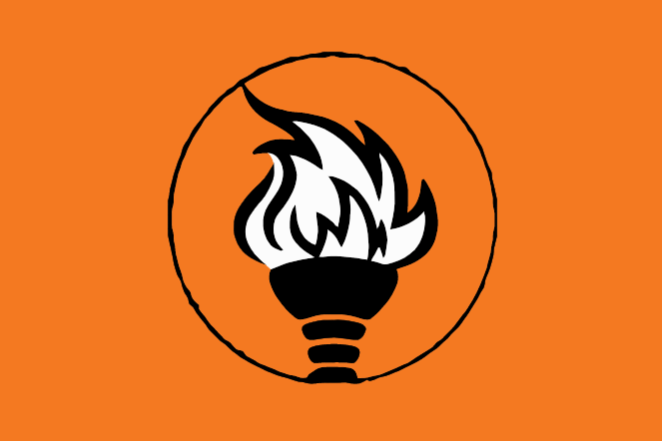

Website
- shivsena.in www.shivsenaubt.in

Shiv Sena (Uddhav Balasaheb Thackeray) (ISO: Śiva Sēnā (Uddhava Bāḷāsāhēba Ṭhākare); lit. 'Army of Shivaji, led by Uddhav Thackeray'; abbr. SS (UBT)) is a Hindutva-based, Marathi regionalist, nationalist political party formed in 2022 under the leadership of former Chief Minister of Maharashtra, Uddhav Thackeray.

It was allotted a new symbol (Flaming Torch) by the Election Commission, separate from the main Shiv Sena. It was one of two separate factions, the other being the Balasahebanchi Shiv Sena, led by Eknath Shinde, formed as a result of the 2022 Maharashtra political crisis, until the Election Commission recognised the faction led by Eknath Shinde as the legitimate structure of Shiv Sena in February 2023. Thackeray has filed petition against the decision of the ECI at the Supreme Court in New Delhi.

== Formation ==
The party was formed after a split in Shiv Sena as a result of the 2022 Maharashtra political crisis. The split was caused by Eknath Shinde, who staged a rebellion in the party, getting support of the majority of the MLAs of the Sena and later splitting from the group led by Uddhav Thackeray, forming the Maharashtra government with the Bharatiya Janata Party, in which Shinde got the post of chief minister whereas the Bharatiya Janata Party's Devendra Fadnavis became deputy chief minister. The two factions in the Sena later formed separate political parties, with the secular and progressive group, seeking to move further to the left, led by Uddhav Thackeray forming Shiv Sena (Uddhav Balasaheb Thackeray) whereas the traditional and original Hindu nationalist faction of the Shiv Sena led by Eknath Shinde formed the Balasahebanchi Shiv Sena.

=== ECI decision ===
On 17 February 2023, Election Commission of India recognised Eknath Shinde's faction as representing Shiv Sena officially. Shiv Sena (Uddhav Balasaheb Thackeray) leader Uddhav Thackeray has filed an appeal with the Supreme Court of India. Further, in its decision, the ECI allowed the party to keep its maśāl or torch symbol until state assembly by polls. The election symbol has been modified to resemble more like a torch as it was previously alleged that the originally allotted symbol looked more like an icecream.

== Leaders ==
List of leaders of Shiv Sena (Uddhav Balasaheb Thackeray)
SI No.	Name	Photo	Designation
1	Uddhav Balasaheb Thackeray		Founder and National President; Former Chief Minister of Maharashtra
2	Arvind Sawant		Leader, Lok Sabha
3	Sanjay Raut		Leader, Rajya Sabha
4	Ajay Choudhari		Ex-Group Leader, Maharashtra Legislative Assembly
5	Ambadas Danve		Ex-Leader of Opposition, Maharashtra Legislative Council
6	Aaditya Thackeray		Leader, Maharashtra Legislative Assembly and Former Cabinet Minister, Government of Maharashtra

=== List of Lok Sabha members ===
No.	Name	Constituency
1	Arvind Sawant	Mumbai South
2	Rajabhau Waje	Nashik
3	Anil Desai	Mumbai South Central

=== List of Rajya Sabha members ===
No.	Name	Date of appointment	Date of retirement
1	Sanjay Raut	5 July 2022	4 July 2028

== Alliances ==
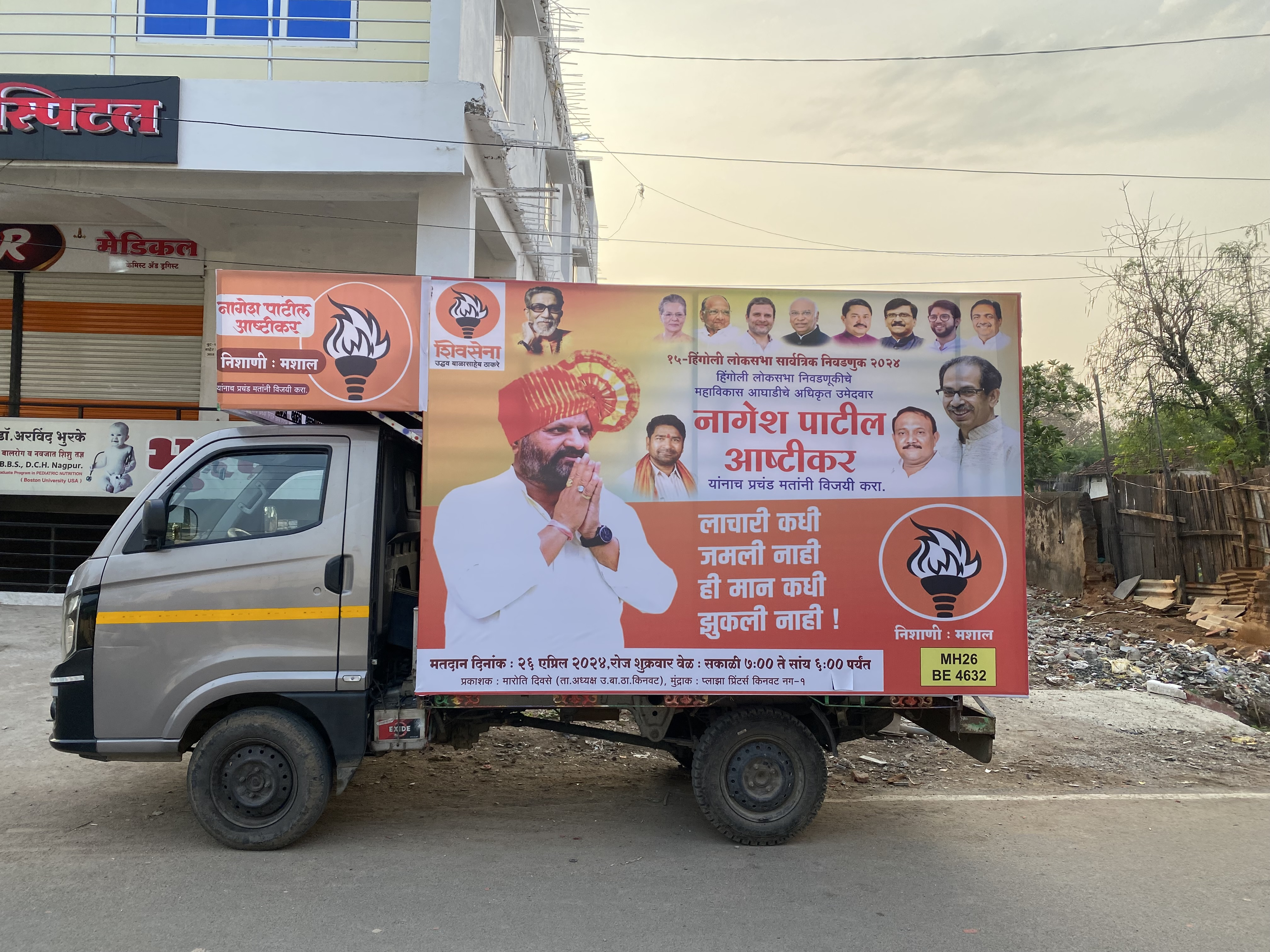
Shiv Sena (UBT) Campaign vehicle in Maharashtra

On 26 August 2022, the party announced an alliance with pro-Maratha outfit Sambhaji Brigade. While both parties said that they have come together to "save constitution and fight for regional pride", political analysts pointed out several contradictions in their positions on various core issues.

On 23 January 2023, the party announced an alliance with the Prakash Ambedkar-led Vanchit Bahujan Aaghadi (VBA). However, on 23 March 2024, Prakash Ambedkar announced VBA's decision to end the alliance.

== Electoral performance ==
In the 2022 Maharashtra gram panchayat polls, the MVA won 457 gram panchayat seats, out of which the NCP got 155 seats, while the SS (UBT) got 153 seats and the Congress got 149 seats. The NDA got 352 seats, out of which the BJP won 239 seats and the BSS won 113 seats. In 2024, SS(UBT) got 9 seats in the 2024 Indian general elections, more than its rival faction. Their Maha Vikas Aghadi alliance got 31 seats out of 48 in Maharashtra. However, in the 2024 Assembly elections, the Maha Vikas Aghadi could only win 50 seats with the Governing MahaYuti winning 235 seats in a landslide victory. SS(UBT) just won 20 seats.

=== Indian General Election results (In Maharashtra) ===
Year	Party leader	Won/ Contested	Change in Seats	Voteshare (%)	+/- (%)	Popular vote	Outcome
2024	Uddhav Thackeray	9 / 21	New	16.52%	New	9,567,779	Opposition

=== State assembly election results ===
Election	Party leader	Pre-poll alliance	Seats contested	Seats won	+/- in seats	Overall vote	Vote %	Vote swing	Sitting side
Maharashtra
2024	Uddhav Thackeray	MVA	92	20 / 288	New	6,433,013	9.96%	New entry	Others

== See also ==
- List of political parties in India
- Indian National Developmental Inclusive Alliance
- Maha Vikas Aghadi
- 2022 Maharashtra political crisis
