= Sanjay Raut =

Indian politician (born 1961)

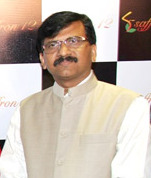

Member of Parliament, Rajya Sabha
- Incumbent
- Assumed office 5 July 2004
- Chairman: Bhairon Singh Shekhawat; Mohammad Hamid Ansari; Venkaiah Naidu; Jagdeep Dhankhar; C. P. Radhakrishnan
- Constituency: Maharashtra

Leader of Shiv Sena (UBT), Rajya Sabha
- Incumbent
- Assumed office 10 October 2022

Member, Committee on Home Affairs and Consultative Committee for the Ministry of Civil Aviation
- Incumbent
- Assumed office 2005

Editor-in-chief, Saamana
- In office 28 November 2019 – 1 March 2020
- Preceded by: Uddhav Thackeray
- Succeeded by: Rashmi Thackeray

Personal details
- Born: 15 November 1961 (age 64) Alibag, Maharashtra, India
- Party: Shiv Sena (UBT) (from 2022)
- Other political affiliations: Shiv Sena (till 2022)
- Spouse: Varsha Raut (m. 1992)
- Relations: Sunil Raut (brother)
- Children: 2
- Education: Mumbai University
- Occupation: Politician; journalist; film producer

Sanjay Rajaram Raut (Marathi pronunciation: [sənd͡ʒəj ɾaːut̪]; born 15 November 1961) is an Indian politician from Shiv Sena (UBT) party. He is a member of the Parliament of India representing Maharashtra in the Rajya Sabha, the upper house of the Indian Parliament. He is the Executive Editor of Marathi newspaper Saamana, published by Uddhav Thackeray, the Shiv Sena party leader. Raut was born in a Chaukalshi family in Alibag, Raigad district.

Sanjay Raut is also the writer of Thackeray, a biopic about Bal Thackeray, the founder of Shiv Sena, released in 2019.

== Member of coordination committee of Indian National Developmental Inclusive Alliance ==
He has been appointed a member of the Coordination Committee of the Indian National Developmental Inclusive Alliance at its Mumbai convention on 1 September 2023. The coordination committee will decide the national agenda, common campaign issues and common program of the country's main opposition alliance (I.N.D.I.A.).

== Controversies ==
After the arrest of the two girls who posted and liked a comment on Facebook about their view of Mumbai shutting down after the death of Bala Saheb Thackeray, he justified the arrests saying "We support the police's action, the Facebook comments could have led to a law-and-order situation."

In April 2015, he created a controversy by saying the voting rights of Muslims should be revoked for some years to ensure the community is not used for vote bank politics. In the newspaper Saamna, he wrote in a column, "Till Muslims are used as vote-banks, they have no future. This is why Bal Thackeray had demanded that Muslims' voting rights be taken away." Raut was taken into custody and detained by the ED in the Patra Chawl scam case. Sanjay Raut allegedly received funds from Pravin Raut, the main accused of the Rs. 60,000 crores scam. The latter is said to have gained access to high levels in the government due to his close relationship with Sanjay Raut, who is a relative, close aide, and also business partner.

In 2022, in the middle of the political turmoil in Maharashtra, Raut was served notice by the Enforcement Directorate (ED) for interrogation.

== Rajya Sabha Election History ==
Position	Party	Constituency	From	To	Tenure
Member of Parliament, Rajya Sabha (1st Term)	SS	Maharashtra	5 July 2004	4 July 2010	5 years, 364 days
Member of Parliament, Rajya Sabha (2nd Term)	SS	Maharashtra	5 July 2010	4 July 2016	5 years, 365 days
Member of Parliament, Rajya Sabha (3rd Term)	SS	Maharashtra	5 July 2016	4 July 2022	5 years, 364 days
Member of Parliament, Rajya Sabha (4th Term)	SS(UBT)	Maharashtra	5 July 2022	4 July 2028	5 years, 365 days

== Member of Rajya Sabha ==
- Member of Rajya Sabha (2004-2010) and Leader of Shiv Sena in Rajya Sabha. (2004-2009)

Parliamentary Committee assignments

- Member of Committee on Home Affairs Member
- Consultative Committee for the Ministry of Civil Aviation (2005-2009)

- Member of Rajya Sabha (Second term) (2010-2016)

Parliamentary Committee assignments

- Member of Committee on Food, Consumer Affairs and Public Distribution Member
- Member Consultative Committee for the Ministry of Power (2010)

- Member of Rajya Sabha (Third term) (2016-2022)

Parliamentary Committee assignments

- 13 September 2021 onwards: Member, Consultative Committee, Committee on External Affairs

- Member of Rajya Sabha (fourth term) (2022–present) representing Shiv Sena (Uddhav Balasaheb Thackeray) after Shiv Sena split in June 2022.

== Bibliography ==
- Raut, Sanjay (March 2025). Narkatla Swarg. New Era Publishing House.

== See also ==
- Rajya Sabha Members
