= 2019 Maharashtra political crisis =

Political crisis in the Indian state of Maharashtra

- Part of Politics of Maharashtra
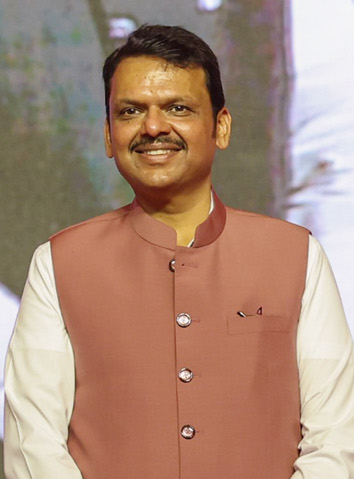
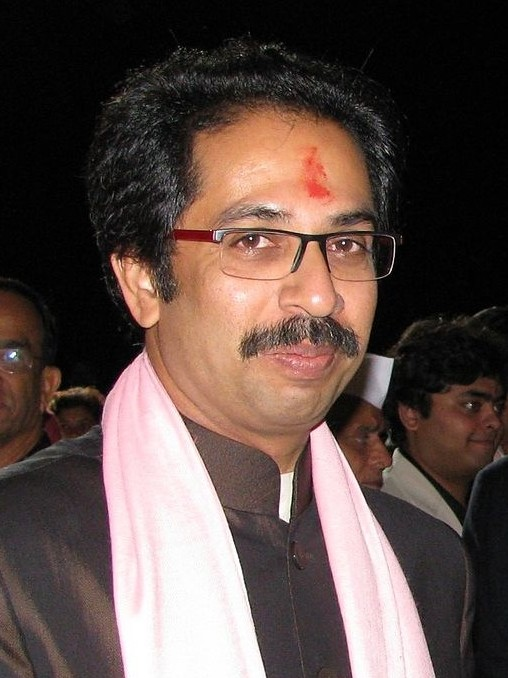
- Devendra Fadnavis (left), Uddhav Thackeray (right)
- Date: 24 October 2019 – 27 November 2019
- Duration: 1 Month, 5 days
- Location: Maharashtra, India
- Also known as: 2019 Maharashtra government formation
- Type: Parliamentary crisis and government formation
- Cause: Split in Bharatiya Janata Party-Shiv Sena alliance
- Participants: Bharatiya Janata Party (BJP); Shiv Sena (SHS); Nationalist Congress Party (NCP); Indian National Congress (INC); Other political parties and Independents
- Outcome: Formation of Maha Vikas Aghadi Government
- Followed by: 2022 Maharashtra political crisis

A political crisis in the Indian state of Maharashtra occurred on 21 October 2019 after the declaration of results of the 2019 legislative assembly election over the formation of a new state government. The incumbent Bharatiya Janata Party Shiv Sena alliance crossed the majority of 145 seats needed in the assembly by winning a total of 161 seats in the alliance. Individually BJP won 105 and SHS won 56 seats. The Opposition INC-NCP Alliance with 106 seats did not reach the majority mark. Individually INC won 44 and NCP won 54 seats.

After the declaration of election results, Shiv Sena declined to support the BJP to form the government, demanding an equal share in power which was promised by BJP. Shiv Sena also demanded the post of Chief Minister for 2.5 years according to 50-50 promise. But BJP declined such promise and eventually ended breaking ties with one of their oldest allies Shiv Sena.

With no political party able to prove their majority of 145 seats in the legislative assembly, president's rule was imposed in the state following a recommendation by the then Governor of Maharashtra Bhagat Singh Koshyari. On 8 November 2019, Koshyari, invited the BJP to form a government as the single largest party. The President's rule was later revoked and the Bharatiya Janata Party, led by former Chief Minister Devendra Fadnavis, formed a government with the help of a small faction of the Nationalist Congress Party, led by Ajit Pawar. However, the BJP was unable to attain the required number to prove majority. After three days, Fadnavis and Pawar resigned. The invitation passed to the second largest party, Shiv Sena, to form government. On 11 November, the Governor invited the NCP to form government. The next day, after the NCP also failed to gain majority support, the governor recommended president's rule to the Council of Ministers of India and the President. This was accepted, and president's rule was imposed.

The political crisis concluded when discussions between Shiv Sena, NCP and INC lead to the formation of a new alliance, Maha Vikas Aghadi. A new government was formed by the Maha Vikas Aghadi, a new alliance of Shiv Sena, the Indian National Congress, and the Nationalist Congress Party, under Uddhav Thackeray. A consensus over government formation was finally achieved with Shiv Sena's Uddhav Thackeray appointed Chief Minister after protracted negotiations.

== Background ==
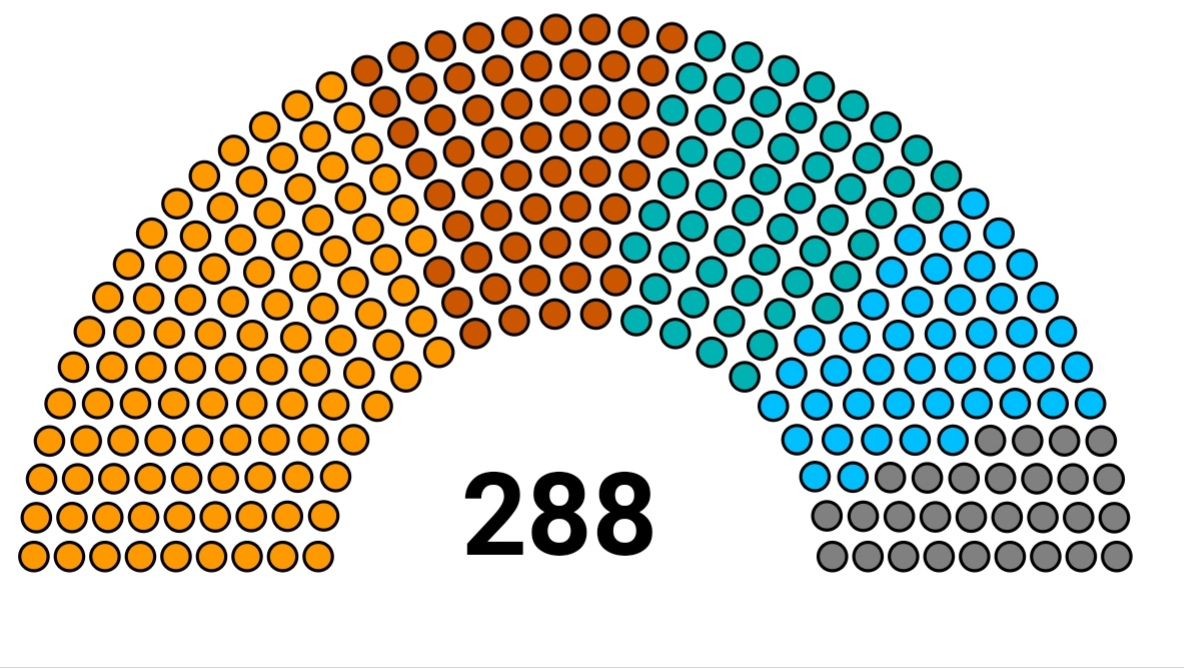
Seat share of 2019 Maharashtra Legislative Assembly election

The Maharashtra Legislative Assembly has 288 seats. In the 2019 election, the Bharatiya Janata Party (BJP) won 105 seats, Shiv Sena won 56, the Nationalist Congress Party (NCP) won 54, and the Indian National Congress (INC) won 44. All India Majlis-e-Ittehadul Muslimeen (AIMIM) and Samajwadi Party (SP) won two seats each while Maharashtra Navnirman Sena (MNS) and the Communist Party of India (Marxist) (CPI (M)) won one seat each. 23 seats were won by other parties and independents. 145 seats are required for a majority to form government.

Two alliances contested the election: the National Democratic Alliance (NDA) or Maha Yuti, a BJP-Shiv Sena alliance, and the United Progressive Alliance (UPA) or Maha-aghadi between the NCP and INC.

== Crisis ==
After the declaration of election results on 24 October, Shiv Sena declined to support the BJP to form the government, on demand an equal share in power which was promised by BJP. Shiv Sena also demanded the post of Chief Minister for 2.5 years according to 50-50 promise. But BJP declined such promise and eventually ended breaking ties with Shiv Sena, one of their oldest allies.

On 8 November 2019, the Governor of Maharashtra Bhagat Singh Koshyari invited the BJP to form a government as the single largest party. However, the BJP declined to form the government on 10 November because it was unable to attain a majority. The invitation passed to the second largest party, Shiv Sena, to form government. On 11 November, the Governor invited the NCP to form government. The next day, after the NCP also failed to gain majority support, the governor recommended president's rule to the Council of Ministers of India and the President. This was accepted, and president's rule was imposed.

=== First Government Formation ===
In the early hours of 23 November, the president's rule was revoked and BJP's Devendra Fadnavis was sworn in as Chief Minister for a second consecutive term, while NCP leader Ajit Pawar was sworn in as Deputy Chief Minister. On the other side, NCP chief Sharad Pawar announced that Ajit Pawar's decision to support the BJP was his own and not endorsed by the party. The NCP split into two factions: one led by Sharad Pawar and the other led by his nephew Ajit Pawar. Later in the day, Ajit Pawar was removed as the parliamentary party leader of the NCP. He clarified that, despite joining hands with BJP, he is an NCP worker and will remain so. The next day Shiv Sena, the NCP, and the INC petitioned the Supreme Court regarding the discretion of the state governor to invite BJP to form government. Shiv Sena also requested the Supreme Court order the new government to prove majority in the legislative assembly. On 26 November, the Supreme Court ordered the new government to prove the majority in the legislative assembly by the evening of the next day. The same day, Ajit Pawar and Fadnavis resigned as Deputy Chief Minister and Chief Minister.

Several NCP MLAs from breakaway faction who were present at Ajit Pawar's swearing in ceremony at Raj Bhavan later claimed that they were misled and were unaware of Ajit Pawar's defection. Shiv Sena, the NCP, and the INC rounded up their MLAs after Fadnavis' oath and kept them sequestered in various hotels and buses to prevent horse-trading.

=== Second Government Formation ===
The discussions between Shiv Sena, NCP and INC ended with the formation of a new alliance, Maha Vikas Aghadi. A consensus was finally achieved with Shiv Sena's Uddhav Thackeray appointed Chief Minister after protracted negotiations.

The Maha Vikas Aghadi (MVA); a post-election alliance of Shiv Sena, NCP and INC with other small parties such as the Samajwadi Party and Peasants and Workers Party of India staked the claim to form a new government under the chief ministership of Uddhav Thackeray. The MVA leaders met the governor and submitted a letter of support of MLAs of MVA. Thackeray was sworn-in as the 19th Chief Minister of Maharashtra on 28 November 2019 at Shivaji Park in Mumbai.

In 2022, during a party meeting, Uddhav Thackeray explained his move to pull out of NDA to join UPA. "We supported the BJP wholeheartedly to enable them to fulfill their national ambitions. The understanding was they will go national while we will lead in Maharashtra. But we were betrayed and attempts were made to destroy us in our home. So we had to hit back". Thackeray accused BJP of dumping its allies according to its political convenience. He said, "BJP doesn't mean Hindutva. I stand by my comment that Shiv Sena had wasted 25 years in alliance with BJP"

== Timeline ==
9 November
The BJP is invited to form government.
10 November
The BJP declines to form a government due to a lack of a majority. Shiv Sena is invited to form government.
11 November
Shiv Sena fails to get support. The NCP is invited to form government.
12 November
The NCP is invited form government. President's rule is proposed by the Governor and later approved and imposed by the Union Cabinet.
22 November
Shiv Sena, NCP, INC unanimously decided to form government under the leadership of Uddhav Thackeray.
23 November
At midnight, the BJP with NCP's Ajit Pawar claimed to form government. This was accepted by the Governor and a recommendation to lift president's rule was sent to the central government. At 5:47 am, president's rule was lifted from Maharashtra. In the early morning, at 8 am, Devendra Fadnavis and Ajit Pawar took oath as Chief Minister and Deputy Chief Minister of Maharashtra respectively.
Shiv Sena, INC, NCP petition the Supreme Court for a special hearing.
24 November
The Supreme Court Of India sets up a Special Bench.
26 November
The Supreme Court issues an order for a floor test to prove majority within 24 hours to Devendra Fadnavis
First, Ajit Pawar as he decided to rejoin both in his both his party and family and little later Devendra Fadnavis resigned due to lack of majority.
Shiv Sena, NCP, INC and other parties approached the Governor to stake claim to form government
28 November
Uddhav Thackeray sworn in as Chief Minister Of Maharashtra
30 November
Thackeray passes floor test with 169 votes in favour after BJP and allies walked out from the Assembly
1 December
Nana Patole from INC elected Speaker unopposed after BJP withdrew its candidature

== See also ==
- 2023 Maharashtra Political crisis
- 2019 Maharashtra Legislative Assembly election
- 2019 Karnataka political crisis
- 2015 Bihar political crisis
