= Maha Vikas Aghadi =

Indian political alliance

- Abbreviation: MVA
- Leader: Aditya Thackeray (Leader of the largest opposition party, SS (UBT))
- President: Uddhav Thackeray
- Chairperson: Sharad Pawar
- Secretary: Balasaheb Thorat
- Spokesperson: Clyde Crasto
- Rajya Sabha Leader: Sharad Pawar
- Lok Sabha Leader: Supriya Sule
- Founders: Uddhav Thackeray; Sharad Pawar; Prithviraj Chavan
- Founded: 26 November 2019; 6 years ago
- Preceded by: Democratic Front
- Political position: Big tent (Note: Members consists of right-wing to left parties.)
- National affiliation: INDIA
- Colours: Blue
- Rajya Sabha: 2 / 19
- Lok Sabha: 25 / 48
- Maharashtra Legislative Council: 13 / 78
- Maharashtra Legislative Assembly: 48 / 288

The Maha Vikas Aghadi (transl. Grand Development Front; abbreviated as MVA), is a state-level political alliance of centre to centre-left (Note: The alliance titls slightly to the left with the INC and NCP (SP) being left wing and SHS (UBT) being centre-right.) political parties in the Indian state of Maharashtra. It is one of the two major political alliances in Maharashtra, the other one being Maha Yuti. The alliance was formed under the leadership of Uddhav Thackeray of SHS (UBT) (then Shiv Sena), Sharad Pawar of the NCP(SP) (then NCP) and Sonia Gandhi of the INC, along with the support from the PWPI, CPI(M) and several other political parties. Most of the MVA constituents are members of the Indian National Congress-led Indian National Developmental Inclusive Alliance at pan-India level. The MVA alliance won 30 seats out of 48 seats in the 2024 Lok Sabha Election in Maharashtra whereas on the other hand, the MVA suffered a setback in 2024, when it could only win a record low of 50 seats (including 2 of SP, which has left the alliance) in the 2024 Maharashtra Legislative Assembly election, with none of the parties even managing to get the number of seats to have a leader of opposition in the assembly. This stripped its status as the official opposition in the Maharashtra Legislative Assembly.

== Formation ==
The alliance was formed by non-NDA political parties in Maharashtra as a result of 2019 Maharashtra political crisis where the Shiv Sena left the NDA post-polls over differences with the BJP in their preferred candidates for Chief Minister and other important portfolio positions after the 2019 Maharashtra Legislative Assembly election. Sharad Pawar, Sanjay Raut, Ahmed Patel and other leaders across the NCP, INC and Shiv Sena worked to realise a new alliance after Shiv Sena and BJP parted ways and Shiv Sena's lone Union Minister in Modi's cabinet, Arvind Sawant, tendered his resignation.

Uddhav Thackeray was elected as the president of the MVA after a meeting on 26 November 2019. He took oath of the office and secrecy on 28 November 2019 as the 19th Chief Minister of Maharashtra state.

In 2022, during a party meeting, Uddhav Thackeray explained his move to pull out of NDA. He said, "We supported the BJP wholeheartedly to enable them to fulfill their national ambitions. The understanding was they will go national while we will lead in Maharashtra. But we were betrayed and attempts were made to destroy us in our home. So we had to hit back". Thackeray accused BJP of dumping its allies according to its political convenience. He said, "BJP doesn't mean Hindutva. I stand by my comment that Shiv Sena had wasted 25 years in alliance with BJP."

In the 2024 Maharashtra Legislative Assembly election, the governing Maha Yuti won a large majority. The MVA won only 50 seats in the legislative assembly, with none of its constituent parties winning enough seats to nominate a leader of the opposition.

== Working ==
Given the varied ideologies among the partner parties, there was a plan to form two committees to guide the coalition: a coordination committee for the implementation of a common minimum programme and a higher decision-making committee that would include the party chiefs.

== History ==
=== Shiv Sena left NDA ===
A political crisis in the Indian state of Maharashtra occurred on 21 October 2019 after the declaration of results of the 2019 legislative assembly election over the formation of a new state government. The incumbent Bharatiya Janata Party Shiv Sena alliance crossed the majority of 145 seats needed in the assembly by winning a total of 161 seats in the alliance. Individually BJP won 105 and SHS won 56 seats. The Opposition INC-NCP Alliance with 106 seats did not reach the majority mark. Individually INC won 44 and NCP won 54 seats.

=== Shiv Sena's Shinde faction breakaway ===
Eknath Shinde, a senior Shiv Sena leader, wanted to break the Maha Vikas Aghadi and establish BJP-Shiv Sena coalition again. Subsequently, he gathered the support of 2/3rd members of his party. On 29 June, Uddhav Thackeray resigned from the post of Chief Minister ahead of the No-confidence motion. Eknath Shinde took oath as the new Chief Minister with Devendra Fadnavis as Deputy CM on 30 June.

=== NCP's Ajit Pawar faction breakaway ===
Ajit Pawar takes oath as Deputy Chief Minister of Maharashtra, Nationalist Congress Party breaks into two camps and 9 NCP MLAs with former UPA Minister Praful Patel take oath as Cabinet Minister in Eknath Shinde-led Government of Maharashtra.

== Current members ==
- Note: MPs in the Rajya Sabha And Lok Sabha only include those from Maharashtra seats

Party	Symbol	Flag	MLAs in Maharashtra Assembly	MLCs in Maharashtra Council	MPs in Lok Sabha	MPs in Rajya Sabha
Indian National Congress			16 / 288	4 / 78	14 / 48	2 / 19
Shiv Sena (Uddhav Balasaheb Thackeray)			20 / 288	5 / 78	3 / 48	1 / 19
Nationalist Congress Party (Sharadchandra Pawar)			10 / 288	3 / 78	8 / 48	1 / 19
Communist Party of India (Marxist)			1 / 288	0 / 78	0 / 48	0 / 19
Communist Party of India			0 / 288	0 / 78	0 / 48	0 / 19
Peasants and Workers Party of India			1 / 288	0 / 78	0 / 48	0 / 19
Total			48 / 288	12 / 78	25 / 48	4 / 19

=== List of Rajya Sabha members ===
No	Name	Party affiliation	Date of Appointment	Date of Retirement
1	Sharad Pawar	NCP-SP	10-Apr-2026	09-Apr-2032
2	Chandrakant Handore	INC	03-Apr-2024	02 Apr-2030
3	Imran Pratapgarhi	INC	05-Jul-2022	04-Jul-2028
4	Sanjay Raut	SS(UBT)	05-Jul-2022	04-Jul-2028

=== List of Lok Sabha members ===
No	Constituency	Name	Party
1	Nandurbar (ST)	Adv. Gowaal K Padavi	INC
2	Dhule	Dr. Shobha Dinesh Bachhav	INC
3	Amravati (SC)	Balwant Basawant Wankhede	INC
4	Wardha	Amar Sharadrao Kale	NCP-SP
5	Ramtek (SC)	Shyamkumar (Bablu) Barve	INC
6	Bhandara–Gondiya	Dr. Prashant Yadavrao Padole	INC
7	Gadchiroli–Chimur (ST)	Dr. Namdeo Dasaram Kirsan	INC
8	Chandrapur	Pratibha Suresh Dhanorkar	INC
9	Nanded	Ravindra Vasantrao Chavan	INC
10	Jalna	Dr. Kalyan Kale	INC
11	Dindori (ST)	Bhaskar Bhagare	NCP-SP
12	Nashik	Rajabhau Waje	SS(UBT)
13	Bhiwandi	Suresh Mhatre	NCP-SP
14	Mumbai North Central	Varsha Gaikwad	INC
15	Mumbai South Central	Anil Desai	SS(UBT)
16	Mumbai South	Arvind Sawant	SS(UBT)
17	Baramati	Supriya Sule	NCP-SP
18	Shirur	Amol Kolhe	NCP-SP
19	Ahmednagar	Nilesh Dnyandev Lanke	NCP-SP
20	Beed	Bajrang Sonawane	NCP-SP
21	Latur (SC)	Dr. Shivajirao Kalge	INC
22	Solapur (SC)	Praniti Sushilkumar Shinde	INC
23	Madha	Dhairyasheel Mohite Patil	NCP-SP
24	Sangli	Vishal Patil	INC
25	Kolhapur	Shahu Chhatrapati Maharaj	INC

== Electoral performance ==
=== Indian General Election results (In Maharashtra) ===
Year	Seats won/ Seats contested	Change in Seats	Voteshare (%)	+/- (%)	Popular vote
2024	31 / 48	▲32	43.71%	▲11.14%	25,015,819

=== Legislative Assembly Election ===
Year	Seats won/ Seats contested	Change in Seats	Voteshare (%)	+/- (%)	Popular vote
2024	50 / 288	▼26	35.16		22,710,220

== Past members ==
Party	Base State	Year of withdrawal
Prahar Janshakti Party	Maharashtra	2022
Bahujan Vikas Aghadi	Maharashtra	2022
Shiv Sena	Maharashtra	2022
Nationalist Congress Party	Maharashtra	2023
Swabhimani Shetkari Sangathan	Maharashtra	2023
Janata Dal (United)	Bihar	2024
Rashtriya Samaj Paksha	Maharashtra	2024
Vanchit Bahujan Aghadi	Maharashtra	2024
Samajwadi Party	Uttar Pradesh	2024
