= Eknath Shinde =

Indian politician (born 1964)

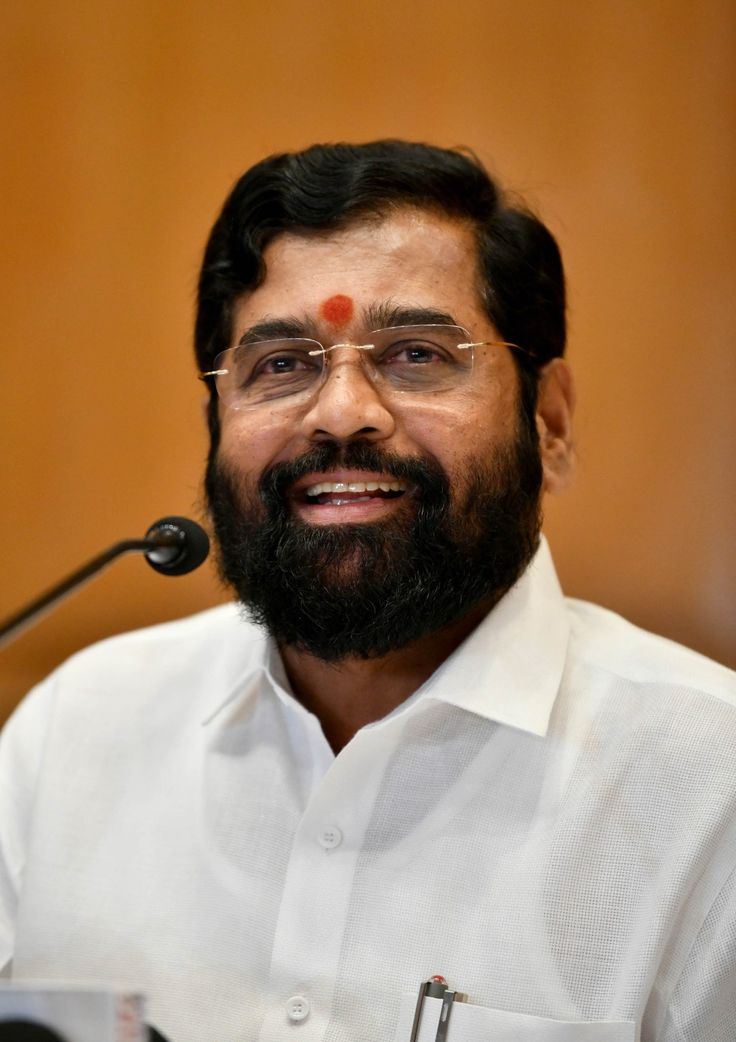
- Shinde in 2024

10th Deputy Chief Minister of Maharashtra
- Incumbent
- Assumed office 5 December 2024 Serving with Ajit Pawar (until 28 January 2026) Sunetra Pawar (from 31 January 2026)
- Governor: C. P. Radhakrishnan; Acharya Devvrat (additional charge); Jishnu Dev Varma
- Chief Minister: Devendra Fadnavis
- Ministry and Departments: Urban Development; Housing; Public Works (including Public Enterprises)
- Preceded by: Devendra Fadnavis

20th Chief Minister of Maharashtra
- In office 30 June 2022 – 5 December 2024
- Governor: Bhagat Singh Koshyari; Ramesh Bais; C. P. Radhakrishnan
- Cabinet: Eknath Shinde ministry
- Preceded by: Uddhav Thackeray
- Succeeded by: Devendra Fadnavis
State ministerial portfolios 2014‍–‍2022
Minister of Urban Development, PWD and State Border Defence of Maharashtra
In office 30 December 2019 – 27 June 2022
Governor	Bhagat Singh Koshyari
Chief Minister	Uddhav Thackeray
Preceded by	Himself (acting) Uddhav Thackeray (additional charge)
Succeeded by	Subhash Desai (additional charge)
Maharashtra Minister of Public Health
In office 7 January 2019 – 12 November 2019
Chief Minister	Devendra Fadnavis
Preceded by	Deepak Sawant
Succeeded by	Jayant Patil (acting)
Maharashtra Minister of Public Works (including Public Undertakings)
In office 5 December 2014 – 12 November 2019
Governor	C. Vidyasagar Rao; Bhagat Singh Koshiyari
Chief Minister	Devendra Fadnavis
Preceded by	Eknath Khadse (acting)
Succeeded by	Himself (acting)

Leader of the House in Maharashtra Legislative Assembly
- In office 3 July 2022 – 5 December 2024
- Deputy: Devendra Fadnavis; Ajit Pawar
- Preceded by: Uddhav Thackeray
- Succeeded by: Devendra Fadnavis

19th Leader of the Opposition in Maharashtra Legislative Assembly
- In office 12 November 2014 – 5 December 2014
- Chief Minister: Devendra Fadnavis
- Preceded by: Eknath Khadse
- Succeeded by: Radhakrishna Vikhe Patil

Member of Maharashtra Legislative Assembly
- Incumbent
- Assumed office 22 October 2009
- Preceded by: Constituency established
- Constituency: Kopri-Pachpakhadi
- In office 17 October 2004 – 22 October 2009
- Preceded by: Moreshwar Joshi
- Succeeded by: Rajan Vichare
- Constituency: Thane

Chairperson (Mukhya Neta) of Shiv Sena
- Incumbent
- Assumed office 17 February 2023
- Preceded by: Uddhav Thackeray (as Pramukh)

Leader of Balasahebanchi Shiv Sena
- In office 10 October 2022 – 17 February 2023
- Preceded by: Position established
- Succeeded by: Position abolished

33th Leader of the House in Maharashtra Legislative Council
- Incumbent
- Assumed office 9 December 2024
- Deputy: Pankaja Munde
- Chief Minister: Devendra Fadnavis
- Chairman: Ram Shinde
- Preceded by: Devendra Fadnavis

Personal details
- Born: Eknath Sambhaji Shinde; 9 February 1964 (age 62) Mahabaleshwar, Maharashtra, India
- Citizenship: India
- Party: Shiv Sena
- Other political affiliations: Maha Yuti (2022–present; 2014–2019); National Democratic Alliance (2022–present; 1999–2019); Balasahebanchi Shiv Sena (2022–2023); Shiv Sena (1999–2022)
- Spouse: Lata Shinde
- Children: 3
- Education: Bachelor of Arts
- Alma mater: Yashwantrao Chavan Maharashtra Open University
- Occupation: Politician

Eknath Shinde (born 9 February 1964) is an Indian politician who has served as the 10th Deputy Chief Minister of Maharashtra alongside Sunetra Pawar under Chief Minister Devendra Fadnavis. He is the chairman of Shiv Sena since February 2023 and was the 20th Chief Minister of Maharashtra from 30 June 2022 to 5 December 2024. He is also the Member of Legislative Assembly for the Kopri-Pachpakhadi Assembly constituency of Thane, Maharashtra, since 2009 and was formerly the MLA of Thane constituency from 2004 to 2009.

Shinde rose to prominence in June 2022 after leading a factional split within the Shiv Sena party, leading to the 2022 Maharashtra political crisis that resulted in the collapse of the Maha Vikas Aghadi (MVA) coalition government in Maharashtra. Shinde and a group of rebel MLAs withdrew support from the MVA, pledging support to the Bhartiya Janata Party (BJP) instead, which was in opposition at the time. After the resignation of the-then Chief Minister and leader of the MVA, Uddhav Thackeray without facing the floor test, Eknath Shinde was sworn-in as Chief Minister on June 30, 2022. In February 2023, the Election Commission of India (ECI) ruled in favor of Shinde’s faction, granting it the official Shiv Sena name and the party symbol, based on its legislative majority and the 2019 electoral performance.

The Thackeray faction challenged the defection before the Supreme Court of India and sought disqualification of the rebel MLAs. In May 2023, the Court delivered a unanimous verdict declaring the decisions of the then Governor, Bhagat Singh Koshyari to demand a floor test was illegal. While the Court did not reverse the ECI’s decision or disqualify the MLAs directly, it held that the then Maharashtra Legislative Speaker, Rahul Narwekar's recognition of Shinde’s faction as the original Shiv Sena was not in accordance with constitutional principles.

Shinde served as Chief Minister till the 2024 Maharashtra Assembly elections, in coalition with the Mahayuti alliance. In the 2024 Assembly elections, the BJP was voted at the largest political party. Following the election, Shinde was sworn in to the role of Deputy Chief Minister, with Fadnavis returning to the role as Chief Minister for his third term.

== Early life ==
Eknath Shinde hails from 'Dare Tamb' village, Mahabaleshwar taluka in Satara, Maharashtra, and belongs to the Kshatriya Maratha community. His family moved to Thane. He studied until 11th standard at Mangala High School & Junior College, Thane. Shinde left school to support his family financially and worked as an auto-rickshaw driver before joining politics. He later resumed his education after joining the First Fadnavis ministry in 2014 and graduated with a Bachelor of Arts degree from Yashwantrao Chavan Maharashtra Open University in 2020.

Shinde was awarded an honorary D.Litt. (Doctor of Literature) by D.Y. Patil University at the convocation of the university in Navi Mumbai on 28 March 2023, at the hands of Maharashtra governor Ramesh Bais and university chancellor Vijay Patil.

== Political career ==
=== Entry into politics ===
Shinde was introduced to politics by then Thane Shiv Sena President Anand Dighe in early 1980. Initially, he was leading the Shiv Sena agitation in the Wagle Estate. He became one of the prominent labour leader in the region. After recognition from Dighe, in 1984 he became a Shakha Pramukh in Thane. In 1997, he was elected to the Thane Municipal Corporation as a corporator for the first time. Shinde became successor to Dighe's legacy after his death in 2001. Later in 2001 he was elected to the post of the Leader of the House of the Thane Municipal Corporation. In 2002 he was re-elected to the Thane Municipal Corporation for the second time.

==== Maharashtra Legislative Assembly & ministries ====
He has been elected as Member of Legislative Assembly since 2004 for four consecutive terms.

- 2004 : Elected to the Maharashtra Legislative Assembly for the first time
- 2005 : Appointed as the Thane district head of Shiv Sena. First MLA to have been appointed at such a coveted post in the party
- 2009 : Re-elected to the Maharashtra Legislative Assembly
- 2014 : Re-elected to the Maharashtra Legislative Assembly

October 2014 – December 2014: Leader of the Opposition in the Maharashtra Legislative Assembly** 2014 – 2019: Cabinet Minister of PWD (PU) in Maharashtra State Government 2014 – 2019: Appointed as the guardian minister of Thane District 2018 : Appointed as a Leader of Shiv Sena Party 2019 : Cabinet Minister of Public Health and Family Welfare (Marathi: सार्वजनिक आरोग्य आणि कुटुंब कल्याण) in Maharashtra State Government

- 2019 : Elected to the Maharashtra Legislative Assembly for the fourth consecutive time
  - 2019 : Appointed as the minister of Urban Development and Public Works (Public Undertakings)
  - 2019 : Appointed as the Minister of Home Affairs (Acting) (28 November 2019 – 30 December 2019)
- 2020 : Appointed as the guardian minister of Thane district
- 2022 : Appointed as the Chief Minister of Maharashtra by the Governor of Maharashtra.
- 2024: Re-elected to the Maharashtra Legislative Assembly. Sworn in as Deputy Chief Minister of Maharashtra on 5 December 2024.

=== Role in 2022 Maharashtra political crisis ===
Shinde was in favour of breaking the Maha Vikas Aghadi alliance and reestablishing an alliance with the Bharatiya Janata Party. He requested Uddhav Thackeray to break the Maha Vikas Aghadi alliance due to ideological differences. Few Shiv Sena members alleged that their complaints were ignored by Uddhav Thackeray. Shinde was able to gather 2/3rd of members from his party to support his request. The crisis began on 21 June 2022 when Shinde and several other MLAs of the Maha Vikas Aghadi (MVA) coalition moved to Surat in the BJP-governed Gujarat, throwing the coalition into a chaos. As a result of Shinde's revolt, Uddhav Thackeray resigned from the post of Chief Minister of Maharashtra and said that he will also resign from the Maharashtra Legislative Council. Shinde successfully reestablished an alliance with the BJP and was sworn in as the 20th Chief minister, with Bharatiya Janata Party's Devendra Fadnavis being sworn as the Deputy Chief Minister.

== Leader of Shiv Sena ==
=== Shiv Sena leadership dispute ===
After Eknath Shinde established the government, he started using the Shiv Sena name and symbols without Uddhav Thackrey's permission. This created issues as Uddhav Thackeray also claimed to be the leader of Shiv Sena. Uddhav's faction challenged this in court, which was eventually moved to the Election Commission of India. The Commission recognized Eknath Shinde's faction as the real Shiv Sena party, which ended the leadership dispute. The Election Commission also found the changes made to the Shiv Sena party constitution in 2018, under the leadership of Uddhav Thackeray, to be undemocratic. The amendments centralized the party's control and were criticized for not allowing free, fair, and transparent elections for the party positions.

=== Political legitimacy ===
On 4 February 2024, Maharashtra Legislative Assembly Speaker Rahul Narwekar ruled that Shinde's faction was the "real Shiv Sena" political party. This decision was a significant setback for the rival faction led by former Chief Minister Uddhav Thackeray.

=== Electoral performance ===
Under Shinde's leadership, his faction of the Shiv Sena performed well in the 2024 Lok Sabha elections. The party secured 7 seats, demonstrating a higher success rate compared to their alliance partner, the BJP, which won 9 seats in Maharashtra. This electoral success helped consolidate Shinde's position within the state's political landscape.

== Personal life ==
On 2 June 2000, their son (aged 11, born 1989) and daughter Shubhada (aged 8, born 1992) went boating in a lake near their native village in Maharashtra. The boat overturned, and both children died by drowning. Shinde went into a period of depression for several months. Anand Dighe provided emotional support to Shinde and entrusted him with greater responsibility in order to keep his mind occupied and away from depression.

Their surviving child, Shrikant Shinde, is an orthopaedic surgeon who has also been the elected Member of Parliament to the Lok Sabha from the Kalyan constituency since 2014 (re-elected in 2019 and 2024).

== Popular culture ==
Dharmaveer, a 2022 Indian Marathi-language biographical drama film by Pravin Tarde, covered Anand Dighe and Eknath Shinde's life. Kshitish Date played the role of Eknath Shinde. Eknath Shinde has a starring role in Dharmaveer as one of Dighe’s most loyal foot soldiers.

In September 2024, sequel called Dharmaveer 2 was launched in which Eknath Shinde himself played a last scene cameo before the end of the film.

Political offices
Preceded by Jaydattaji Kshirsagar	Cabinet Minister for Public Works (Undertakings); Maharashtra State; December 2014 – July 2023	Succeeded by Dadaji Bhuse
Preceded by Ganesh Naik	Maharashtra State Guardian Minister for Thane district December 2014 – September 2022	Succeeded by Shambhuraj Desai
