= Satara Lok Sabha constituency =

Lok Sabha Constituency in Maharashtra

Coordinates: 17.7°N 74.0°E

Satara
- Lok Sabha constituency
- Satara Lok Sabha Constituency map

Constituency details
- Country: India
- Region: Western India
- State: Maharashtra
- Assembly constituencies: Wai; Koregaon; Karad North; Karad South; Patan; Satara
- Established: 1951
- Total electors: 18,60,239
- Reservation: None

Member of Parliament
- 18th Lok Sabha
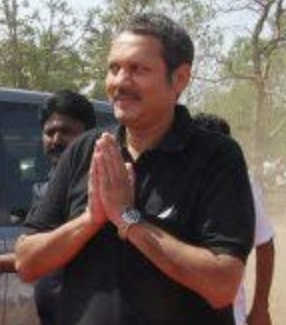
- Incumbent Udayanraje Bhosale
- Party: BJP
- Elected year: 2024
- Preceded by: Shriniwas Patil

Satara Lok Sabha constituency is one of the 48 Lok Sabha (parliamentary) constituencies in Maharashtra state in western India, in Satara district.

== Assembly segments ==
Presently, Satara Lok Sabha constituency comprises the following six legislative assembly segments:

| # | Name | District | Member | Party | Leading (in 2024) |
|---|---|---|---|---|---|
| 256 | Wai | Satara | Makrand Jadhav Patil | NCP | NCP(SP) |
| 257 | Koregaon | Satara | Mahesh Shinde | SHS | BJP |
| 259 | Karad North | Satara | Manoj Ghorpade | BJP | NCP(SP) |
| 260 | Karad South | Satara | Atulbaba Suresh Bhosale | BJP | BJP |
| 261 | Patan | Satara | Shambhuraj Desai | SHS | NCP(SP) |
| 262 | Satara | Satara | Shivendra Raje Bhosale | BJP | BJP |

== Members of Parliament ==
| Year | Name | Party |
|---|---|---|
| 1951 | Ganesh Altekar (Note: Satara North) | Indian National Congress |
| 1951 | Venkantrao Pawar (Note: Satara South) | Indian National Congress |
| 1957 | Nana Patil | Communist Party of India |
| 1962 | Kisan Mahadeo Veer alias Abasaheb Veer | Indian National Congress |
| 1967 | Yashwantrao Chavan | Indian National Congress |
| 1971 | Yashwantrao Chavan | Indian National Congress |
| 1977 | Yashwantrao Chavan | Indian National Congress |
| 1980 | Yashwantrao Chavan | Indian National Congress (U) |
| 1984 | Prataprao Bhosale | Indian National Congress |
| 1989 | Prataprao Bhosale | Indian National Congress |
| 1991 | Prataprao Bhosale | Indian National Congress |
| 1996 | Hindurao Naik Nimbalkar | Shiv Sena |
| 1998 | Abhaysinhraje Bhosale | Indian National Congress |
| 1999 | Laxmanrao Jadhav-Patil | Nationalist Congress Party |
| 2004 | Laxmanrao Jadhav-Patil | Nationalist Congress Party |
| 2009 | Udayanraje Bhosale | Nationalist Congress Party |
| 2014 | Udayanraje Bhosale | Nationalist Congress Party |
| 2019 | Udayanraje Bhosale | Nationalist Congress Party |
| 2019^ | Shriniwas Patil | Nationalist Congress Party |
| 2024 | Udayanraje Bhosale | Bharatiya Janata Party |

^denotes By-polls

== Election results ==
=== General elections 1951 ===
1951 Indian general election: North Satara
| Party | Candidate | Votes | % | ±% |
|---|---|---|---|---|
| INC | Ganesh Sadashiv Altekar | 91,319 | 45.95 | N/A |
| PWPI | Ramchandra Manohar Nalavade | 54,095 | 27.22 | N/A |
| Independent | Dinkar Dagdoba Deshmukh | 41,159 | 20.71 | N/A |
| Independent | Ramchandra Dattatraya Dixit | 12,166 | 06.12 | N/A |
| Majority | | 37,224 | 18.73 | N/A |
| Turnout | | 1,98,739 | 55.25 | N/A |
| INC hold | | Swing | | |

1951 Indian general election: South Satara
| Party | Candidate | Votes | % | ±% |
|---|---|---|---|---|
| INC | Vyankatrao Pirajirao Pawar | 1,33,915 | 59.80 | N/A |
| PWPI | Dhondaji Pandurang Patil | 59,705 | 26.66 | N/A |
| Independent | Ganesh Kondo Godbole | 17,651 | 07.88 | N/A |
| Independent | Abasaheb Hanumantrao Kharedekar | 12,684 | 05.66 | N/A |
| Majority | | 74,210 | 33.13 | N/A |
| Turnout | | 2,23,955 | 60.69 | N/A |
| INC hold | | Swing | | |

=== General elections 1957 ===
1957 Indian general election: Satara
| Party | Candidate | Votes | % | ±% |
|---|---|---|---|---|
| CPI | Nana Ramchandra Patil | 1,45,194 | 65.42 | N/A |
| INC | Ganesh Sadashiv Altekar | 76,745 | 34.58 | −11.37 |
| Majority | | 68,449 | 30.84 | +12.11 |
| Turnout | | 2,21,939 | 60.54 | +05.29 |
| CPI hold | | Swing | | |

=== General elections 1962 ===
1962 Indian general election: Satara
| Party | Candidate | Votes | % | ±% |
|---|---|---|---|---|
| INC | Kisan Mahadeo Veer | 1,65,879 | 64.07 | +29.49 |
| CPI | Nana Ramchandra Patil | 62,188 | 24.02 | −41.40 |
| PSP | Bapurao Bhaurao Kachare | 17,324 | 06.69 | N/A |
| Independent | Ramrao Subhanrao Barge | 10,164 | 03.93 | N/A |
| SWA | Babasaheb Jagdeorao Shinde | 3,360 | 01.30 | N/A |
| Majority | | 1,03,691 | 40.04 | +09.20 |
| Turnout | | 2,58,915 | 63.83 | +03.29 |
| INC hold | | Swing | | |

=== General elections 1967 ===
1967 Indian general election: Satara
| Party | Candidate | Votes | % | ±% |
|---|---|---|---|---|
| INC | Yashwantrao Balawantrao Chavan | 2,07,895 | 68.78 | +04.71 |
| PWPI | Keshavrao Patloji Pawar | 80,059 | 26.49 | N/A |
| Independent | D. S. Rasal | 14,322 | 04.74 | N/A |
| Majority | | 1,27,836 | 42.29 | +02.25 |
| Turnout | | 3,02,276 | 69.10 | +05.27 |
| INC hold | | Swing | | |

=== General elections 1971 ===
1971 Indian general election: Satara
| Party | Candidate | Votes | % | ±% |
|---|---|---|---|---|
| INC | Yashwantrao Balawantrao Chavan | 2,46,100 | 77.22 | +08.44 |
| PWPI | Keshavrao Patloji Pawar | 69,270 | 21.74 | −04.75 |
| Independent | Pandurang Kondiba Borate | 3,325 | 01.04 | N/A |
| Majority | | 1,76,830 | 55.48 | +13.19 |
| Turnout | | 3,18,695 | 66.39 | −02.71 |
| INC hold | | Swing | | |

=== General elections 1977 ===
1977 Indian general election: Satara
| Party | Candidate | Votes | % | ±% |
|---|---|---|---|---|
| INC | Yashwantrao Balawantrao Chavan | 2,60,562 | 76.38 | −0.84 |
| JP | Nitin Jagannath Lavangare | 68,961 | 20.21 | N/A |
| Independent | Vasant Krishna Thakur | 6,808 | 02.00 | N/A |
| Independent | Shyamsundar Anant Sahastrabudhe | 4,807 | 01.41 | N/A |
| Majority | | 1,91,601 | 56.16 | +0.68 |
| Turnout | | 3,41,138 | 60.60 | −05.79 |
| INC hold | | Swing | | |

=== General elections 1980 ===
1980 Indian general election: Satara
| Party | Candidate | Votes | % | ±% |
|---|---|---|---|---|
| INC(U) | Yashwantrao Balawantrao Chavan | 2,23,213 | 53.95 | −22.43 |
| INC(I) | Shalinitai Vasantrao Patil | 1,70,180 | 41.13 | N/A |
| Independent | Vasant Krishna Thakur | 7,822 | 01.89 | −0.11 |
| Independent | Shamrao Banduji Jagadale | 5,066 | 01.22 | N/A |
| Independent | Bajirao Dadasaheb Chavan | 2,601 | 0.63 | N/A |
| Independent | Balkrishna Bhaskar Paranjape | 2,097 | 0.51 | N/A |
| Independent | Shyamsundar Anant Sahastrabudhe | 1,713 | 0.41 | −01.00 |
| Independent | Shrirang Ramchandra Rokade | 1,065 | 0.26 | N/A |
| Majority | | 53,033 | 12.81 | −43.35 |
| Turnout | | 4,13,757 | 64.47 | +03.87 |
| INC(U) hold | | Swing | | |

=== General elections 1984 ===
1984 Indian general election: Satara
| Party | Candidate | Votes | % | ±% |
|---|---|---|---|---|
| INC | Prataprao Baburao Bhosale | 2,70,110 | 58.48 | N/A |
| IC(S) | Dadaraje Khardekar | 1,74,590 | 37.80 | N/A |
| Independent | Rashid Abdulkakarim Bhagwan | 8,988 | 01.95 | N/A |
| Independent | Nivruti Ishawara Gaikwad | 3,783 | 0.82 | N/A |
| Independent | Raghunath Balwant Dupate | 2,374 | 0.51 | N/A |
| Independent | Shoukatalli Babalal Mulla | 950 | 0.21 | N/A |
| Independent | Bapurao Bhaurao Kachare | 697 | 0.15 | N/A |
| Independent | Dilawar Badshah Shaikh | 390 | 0.08 | N/A |
| Majority | | 95,520 | 20.68 | +07.87 |
| Turnout | | 4,61,882 | 66.45 | +01.98 |
| INC hold | | Swing | | |

=== General elections 1989 ===
1989 Indian general election: Satara
| Party | Candidate | Votes | % | ±% |
|---|---|---|---|---|
| INC | Prataprao Baburao Bhosale | 3,69,467 | 81.94 | +23.46 |
| JD | D.D. Ranavare | 52,476 | 11.64 | N/A |
| Independent | Laxman Waman Jadhav | 5,773 | 01.28 | N/A |
| BSP | Balavant Waman Kakade | 3,636 | 0.81 | N/A |
| Independent | Dastagirbhai Kadarbhai Metkari | 3,452 | 0.77 | N/A |
| Doordarshi Party | Ramcharan Bikanu Kumbhar | 3,283 | 0.73 | N/A |
| DMM | Shaukatalli Babalal Mulla | 2,723 | 0.60 | +0.39 |
| Independent | Arvind Bapurao Pawar | 2,561 | 0.57 | N/A |
| Independent | Maruti Shankar Lokhande | 2,184 | 0.48 | N/A |
| Independent | Balkrishna Ramchandra Mane | 2,101 | 0.47 | N/A |
| Independent | Balu Sadashiv Phalke | 1,436 | 0.32 | N/A |
| Independent | Dattatraya Nivruti Barge | 1,194 | 0.26 | N/A |
| Independent | Suryakant Anandrao Jarad | 622 | 0.14 | N/A |
| Majority | | 3,16,991 | 70.30 | +49.62 |
| Turnout | | 4,50,908 | 50.96 | −15.49 |
| INC hold | | Swing | | |

=== General elections 1991 ===
1991 Indian general election: Satara
| Party | Candidate | Votes | % | ±% |
|---|---|---|---|---|
| INC | Prataprao Baburao Bhosale | 2,61,129 | 66.85 | −15.09 |
| SS | Hindurao Naik Nimbalkar | 1,01,917 | 26.09 | N/A |
| JD | D.D. Ranavare | 12,675 | 03.24 | −08.04 |
| JP | K.B. Jamadade | 5,248 | 01.34 | N/A |
| Bharatiya Krishi Udyog Sangh | Laxman Waman Jadhav | 4,219 | 01.08 | −0.20 |
| Independent | Dastagirbhai Kadarbhai Metkari | 1,856 | 0.48 | −0.29 |
| Independent | Kondiram Dhondiba Shelar | 1,218 | 0.31 | N/A |
| Independent | Shivaji Krishnarao Ghadge | 970 | 0.25 | N/A |
| Doordarshi Party | Pandurang Janardhan Patange | 709 | 0.18 | −0.55 |
| Independent | Dattatraya Nivruti Barge | 662 | 0.17 | −0.09 |
| Majority | | 1,59,212 | 40.76 | −29.54 |
| Turnout | | 3,90,603 | 42.73 | −08.23 |
| INC hold | | Swing | | |

=== General elections 1996 ===
1996 Indian general election: Satara
| Party | Candidate | Votes | % | ±% |
|---|---|---|---|---|
| SS | Hindurao Naik Nimbalkar | 1,90,526 | 35.66 | +09.57 |
| INC | Prataprao Baburao Bhosale | 1,78,717 | 33.45 | −33.40 |
| Independent | Udayanraje Bhosale | 1,13,685 | 21.28 | N/A |
| Independent | R. D. Nikam | 20,917 | 03.92 | N/A |
| Independent | Parth Marippa Polke | 5,886 | 01.10 | N/A |
| MPKP | Laxman Waman Jadhav | 5,765 | 01.08 | N/A |
| Independent | Sonappa Rangu Narale | 5,567 | 01.04 | N/A |
| Bharatiya Minorities Suraksha Mahasangh | Shoukat Alli Babalal Mulla | 2,210 | 0.41 | N/A |
| Independent | Bapurao Bhaurao Kachare | 2,186 | 0.41 | N/A |
| AIIC(T) | Vitthalrao Shankarrao Jadhav | 1,915 | 0.36 | N/A |
| Independent | Ganesh Digambar Inamdar | 1,653 | 0.31 | N/A |
| Independent | Gulabrao Ramchandra Mane | 1,623 | 0.30 | N/A |
| Independent | Chanbassayya Murgayya Hiremath | 1,237 | 0.23 | N/A |
| Independent | Dagadoba Baburao Yadav | 1,180 | 0.22 | N/A |
| Independent | Shamsundar Anant Sahastrabuddhe | 619 | 0.12 | N/A |
| Independent | Jagnnath Ramchandra Nunekar | 541 | 0.10 | N/A |
| Majority | | 11,809 | 02.21 | −38.55 |
| Turnout | | 5,34,227 | 57.77 | +15.04 |
| SS gain from INC | | Swing | | |

=== General elections 1998 ===
1998 Indian general election: Satara
| Party | Candidate | Votes | % | ±% |
|---|---|---|---|---|
| INC | Abhaysinh Shahumaharaj Bhosale | 3,89,238 | 65.20 | +31.75 |
| SS | Hindurao Naik Nimbalkar | 2,07,762 | 34.80 | −0.86 |
| Majority | | 1,81,476 | 30.40 | +28.19 |
| Turnout | | 5,97,000 | 62.70 | +04.93 |
| INC gain from SS | | Swing | | |

=== General elections 1999 ===
1999 Indian general election: Satara
| Party | Candidate | Votes | % | ±% |
|---|---|---|---|---|
| NCP | Laxmanrao Pandurang Jadhav (Patil) | 3,13,325 | 46.82 | N/A |
| SS | Hindurao Naik Nimbalkar | 1,88,554 | 28.17 | −06.63 |
| INC | Yashwantrao Appasaheb Khardekar Nimbalkar | 1,59,953 | 23.90 | −41.30 |
| Maharashtra Pradesh Krantikari Party | Laxman Waman Jadhav | 3,571 | 0.53 | N/A |
| Independent | Laxman Sopan Jadhav | 2,535 | 0.38 | N/A |
| Independent | Sangita Jagdish Gaikwad | 1,323 | 0.20 | N/A |
| Majority | | 1,24,771 | 18.64 | −11.76 |
| Turnout | | 6,69,261 | 71.41 | +08.71 |
| NCP gain from INC | | Swing | | |

=== General elections 2004 ===
2004 Indian general elections: Satara
| Party | Candidate | Votes | % | ±% |
|---|---|---|---|---|
| NCP | Laxmanrao Pandurang Jadhav (Patil) | 2,81,577 | 41.71 | −05.11 |
| SS | Hindurao Naik Nimbalkar | 2,77,620 | 41.11 | +12.94 |
| Independent | Suryajirao Alias Chimanrao Shankarao Kadam | 62,492 | 09.25 | N/A |
| RSPS | Bajarang Subhedar Khatake | 28,325 | 04.19 | N/A |
| BSP | Amar Raghunath Gaikwad | 13,502 | 02.00 | N/A |
| Lok Rajya Party | Dr. Bhagawan Khanderao Yadav | 11,496 | 01.70 | N/A |
| Majority | | 3,957 | 0.58 | −18.06 |
| Turnout | | 6,75,012 | 58.73 | −12.68 |
| NCP hold | | Swing | | |

=== General elections 2009 ===
2009 Indian general elections: Satara
| Party | Candidate | Votes | % | ±% |
|---|---|---|---|---|
| NCP | Udayanraje Pratapsinh Bhosale | 5,32,583 | 65.22 | +23.51 |
| SS | Purushottam Bajirao Jadhav | 2,35,068 | 28.78 | −12.33 |
| BSP | Prashant Vasant Chavan | 25,112 | 03.08 | +01.08 |
| Independent | Alankrita Abhijit Awade-Bichukale | 12,662 | 01.55 | N/A |
| RSPS | Bhausaheb Gangaram Wagh | 11,221 | 01.37 | −02.82 |
| Majority | | 2,97,515 | 36.44 | +35.86 |
| Turnout | | 8,16,646 | 52.81 | −05.92 |
| NCP hold | | Swing | | |

=== General elections 2014 ===
2014 Indian general elections: Satara
| Party | Candidate | Votes | % | ±% |
|---|---|---|---|---|
| NCP | Udayanraje Pratapsinh Bhosale | 5,22,531 | 53.50 | −11.72 |
| Independent | Purushottam Bajirao Jadhav | 1,55,937 | 15.97 | −12.81 |
| AAP | Rajendra Madhukar Chorage | 82,489 | 08.45 | N/A |
| RPI(A) | Ashok Waman Gaikwad | 71,808 | 07.35 | N/A |
| Independent | Sandip Amrutrao Mozar | 18,215 | 01.86 | N/A |
| Independent | Subhash Nivrutti Shilewant | 15,073 | 01.54 | N/A |
| BSP | Prashant Vasant Chavan | 14,523 | 01.49 | −01.59 |
| BMP | Altaf Abdulgani Shikalgar | 13,760 | 01.41 | N/A |
| BBM | Chandrakant Tatu Khandait | 12,270 | 01.26 | N/A |
| Independent | Suhas Vishwasrao Deshmukh | 12,122 | 01.24 | N/A |
| Independent | Pandurang Ramchandra Shinde | 11,304 | 01.16 | N/A |
| NOTA | None of the Above | 10,589 | 01.08 | N/A |
| Independent | Sagar Uttamrao Kadam | 10,047 | 01.03 | N/A |
| Independent | Varsha Madgulkar | 9,405 | 0.96 | N/A |
| Independent | Umesh Mukund Waghmare | 4,711 | 0.48 | N/A |
| Independent | Dr. Vijaysinha Diliprao Patil | 3,654 | 0.37 | N/A |
| Independent | Abhijit Vamanrao Bichukale | 3,644 | 0.37 | N/A |
| Independent | Sukhdev Bhanudas Gawde | 2,435 | 0.25 | N/A |
| Independent | Dr. Prakash Shamrao Pawar | 2,164 | 0.22 | N/A |
| Majority | | 3,66,594 | 37.53 | +01.09 |
| Turnout | | 9,76,681 | 56.78 | +03.97 |
| NCP hold | | Swing | | |

=== General elections 2019 ===
2019 Indian general elections: Satara
| Party | Candidate | Votes | % | ±% |
|---|---|---|---|---|
| NCP | Udayanraje Pratapsinh Bhosale | 579,026 | 51.91 | −1.59 |
| SS | Narendra Annasaheb Patil | 4,52,498 | 40.57 | N/A |
| VBA | Sahadeo Kerappa Aiwale | 40,673 | 3.65 | N/A |
| NOTA | None of the Above | 9,227 | 0.83 | −0.25 |
| Majority | | 1,26,528 | 11.34 | −26.19 |
| Turnout | | 11,17,757 | 60.47 | |
| NCP hold | | Swing | | |

=== Bye-Election 2019 ===
Bye-election, 2019: Satara
| Party | Candidate | Votes | % | ±% |
|---|---|---|---|---|
| NCP | Shriniwas Patil | 636,620 | 51.04 | −0.91 |
| BJP | Udayanraje Bhosale | 5,48,903 | 44.01 | |
| Independent | Shivajirao Jadhav | 26,407 | 2.12 | N/A |
| VBA | Chandrakant Khandait | 17,203 | 1.38 | N/A |
| NOTA | None of the Above | 10,159 | 0.81 | N/A |
| Majority | | 87,717 | 7.02 | |
| Turnout | | 12,49,151 | 67.15 | |
| NCP hold | | Swing | | |

=== General elections 2024 ===
2024 Indian general elections: Satara
| Party | Candidate | Votes | % | ±% |
|---|---|---|---|---|
| BJP | Udayanraje Bhosale | 571,134 | 47.67 | ▲3.66 |
| NCP-SP | Shashikant Shinde | 5,38,363 | 44.94 | New |
| Independent | Sanjay Kondiba Gade | 37,062 | 3.09 | New |
| VBA | Prashant Raghunath Kadam | 11,912 | 1.00 | New |
| BSP | Anand Ramesh Thorwade | 6,485 | 0.50 | New |
| NOTA | None of the Above | 5,522 | 0.46 | ▼0.35 |
| Majority | | 32,771 | 2.74 | ▼4.28 |
| Turnout | | 12,00,184 | 63.19 | ▼3.54 |
| BJP gain from NCP | | Swing | | |

== See also ==
- Satara district
- List of constituencies of the Lok Sabha
- Satara Assembly constituency

Lok Sabha
| Vacant since 1970; No Official opposition Title last held by Buxar | Constituency represented by the leader of the opposition 1977 – 1978 | Succeeded by Idukki |
| Preceded by Idukki | Constituency represented by the leader of the opposition 1979 | Succeeded by Sasaram |
