= Nitin Patil =

Indian politicians

Nitin Jadhav - Patil

Member of Parliament, Rajya Sabha
- Incumbent
- Assumed office 28 August 2024
- Preceded by: Piyush Goyal
- Constituency: Maharashtra

Personal details
- Party: Nationalist Congress Party
- Parent: Laxmanrao Pandurang Jadhav-Patil
- Relatives: Makrand Jadhav-Patil (Brother)
- Occupation: Politician

Nitin Laxmanrao Jadhav-Patil is an Indian politician currently serving as the Member of Parliament, Rajya Sabha from Maharashtra. He affiliated with the Nationalist Congress Party.

== See also ==
- List of Rajya Sabha members from Maharashtra
- List of current members of the Rajya Sabha
