= Satara Assembly constituency =

Constituency of the Maharashtra legislative assembly in India

Coordinates: 17.68°N 74.02°E

Satara
- Constituency No. 262 for the Maharashtra Legislative Assembly

Constituency details
- Country: India
- Region: Western India
- State: Maharashtra
- District: Satara
- Lok Sabha constituency: Satara
- Established: 1957
- Total electors: 344,018
- Reservation: None

Member of Legislative Assembly
- 15th Maharashtra Legislative Assembly
- Incumbent Shivendra Raje Bhosale
- Party: Bharatiya Janata Party
- Elected year: 2024

Satara Assembly constituency is one of the 288 Vidhan Sabha (Assembly) constituencies of Maharashtra state in Western India. It is a part of Satara Lok Sabha constituency, along with five other assembly constituencies, viz Wai, Karad North, Karad South, Koregaon and Patan from Satara district.

== Members of the Legislative Assembly ==
| Year | Member | Party |
|---|---|---|
| 1957 | Vithalrao Patil | Independent |
| 1962 | Dhondiram Jagtap | Indian National Congress |
| 1967 | Dhondiram Jagtap | Indian National Congress |
| 1972 | Dhondiram Jagtap | Indian National Congress |
| 1978 | Abhaysinhraje Bhosale | Janata Party |
| 1980 | Abhaysinhraje Bhosale | Indian National Congress (I) |
| 1985 | Abhaysinhraje Bhosale | Indian National Congress |
| 1990 | Abhaysinhraje Bhosale | Indian National Congress |
| 1995 | Abhaysinhraje Bhosale | Indian National Congress |
| 1998^ | Udayanraje Bhosale | Bharatiya Janata Party |
| 1999 | Abhaysinhraje Bhosale | Nationalist Congress Party |
| 2004 | Shivendra Raje Bhosale | Nationalist Congress Party |
| 2009 | Shivendra Raje Bhosale | Nationalist Congress Party |
| 2014 | Shivendra Raje Bhosale | Nationalist Congress Party |
| 2019 | Shivendra Raje Bhosale | Bharatiya Janata Party |
| 2024 | Shivendra Raje Bhosale | Bharatiya Janata Party |

== Election results ==
=== Assembly Election 2024 ===
2024 Maharashtra Legislative Assembly election : Satara
| Party | Candidate | Votes | % | ±% |
|---|---|---|---|---|
| BJP | Shivendra Raje Bhosale | 176,849 | 81.25 | ▲21.61 |
| SS(UBT) | Amit Genuji Kadam | 34,725 | 15.95 | New |
| VBA | Baban Ganpat Karde | 2,772 | 1.27 | ▼0.32 |
| NOTA | None of the Above | 2,419 | 1.11 | ▲0.11 |
| Margin of victory | | 142,124 | 65.30 | ▲43.35 |
| Turnout | | 220,081 | 63.97 | ▲4.67 |
| Total valid votes | | 217,662 | | |
| Registered electors | | 344,018 | | ▲1.83 |
| BJP hold | | Swing | ▲21.61 | |

=== Assembly Election 2019 ===
2019 Maharashtra Legislative Assembly election : Satara
| Party | Candidate | Votes | % | ±% |
|---|---|---|---|---|
| BJP | Shivendra Raje Bhosale | 118,005 | 59.64 | ▲32.53 |
| NCP | Deepak Sahebrao Pawar | 74,581 | 37.69 | ▼15.27 |
| VBA | Ashok Gorakhnath Dixit | 3,154 | 1.59 | New |
| NOTA | None of the Above | 1,978 | 1.00 | ▼0.26 |
| Margin of victory | | 43,424 | 21.95 | ▼3.90 |
| Turnout | | 200,362 | 59.31 | ▲0.11 |
| Total valid votes | | 197,871 | | |
| Registered electors | | 337,831 | | ▲8.11 |
| BJP gain from NCP | | Swing | ▲6.68 | |

=== Assembly Election 2014 ===
2014 Maharashtra Legislative Assembly election : Satara
| Party | Candidate | Votes | % | ±% |
|---|---|---|---|---|
| NCP | Shivendra Raje Bhosale | 97,964 | 52.96 | ▼24.76 |
| BJP | Pawar Dipak Sahebrao | 50,151 | 27.11 | ▲14.05 |
| SS | Dagadu Haribhau Sakpal | 25,421 | 13.74 | New |
| INC | Rajani Dipak Pawar | 7,187 | 3.89 | New |
| NOTA | None of the Above | 2,333 | 1.26 | New |
| MNS | Rahul Murlidhar Pawar | 1,164 | 0.63 | New |
| Margin of victory | | 47,813 | 25.85 | ▼38.81 |
| Turnout | | 187,403 | 59.97 | ▲2.98 |
| Total valid votes | | 184,986 | | |
| Registered electors | | 312,474 | | ▲7.38 |
| NCP hold | | Swing | ▼24.76 | |

=== Assembly Election 2009 ===
2009 Maharashtra Legislative Assembly election : Satara
| Party | Candidate | Votes | % | ±% |
|---|---|---|---|---|
| NCP | Shivendra Raje Bhosale | 127,143 | 77.71 | ▲25.11 |
| BJP | Narendra Mohanrao Patil | 21,365 | 13.06 | ▼32.56 |
| SWP | Varsha Laxman Deshpande | 7,349 | 4.49 | New |
| BSP | Chavan Prashant Vasant | 2,147 | 1.31 | New |
| Independent | Kishor Hanmant Dhumal | 1,873 | 1.14 | New |
| LJP | Pradip Ganpat Shivdas | 1,585 | 0.97 | New |
| Independent | Jadhav Sanjay Popatrao | 1,252 | 0.77 | New |
| Margin of victory | | 105,778 | 64.65 | ▲57.67 |
| Turnout | | 163,842 | 56.30 | ▼13.97 |
| Total valid votes | | 163,605 | | |
| Registered electors | | 290,993 | | ▲30.66 |
| NCP hold | | Swing | ▲25.11 | |

=== Assembly Election 2004 ===
2004 Maharashtra Legislative Assembly election : Satara
| Party | Candidate | Votes | % | ±% |
|---|---|---|---|---|
| NCP | Bhonsale Shrimant Shivendrasinh Abhayasinhraje | 82,238 | 52.60 | ▲3.49 |
| BJP | Bhonsle Shrimant Chhatrapati Udayanraje Pratapsinh Maharaj | 71,324 | 45.62 | ▲0.91 |
| Lok Rajya Party | Bharat Mahadeo Gurav (Guruji) | 2,770 | 1.77 | New |
| Margin of victory | | 10,914 | 6.98 | ▲2.57 |
| Turnout | | 156,469 | 70.26 | ▲5.65 |
| Total valid votes | | 156,332 | | |
| Registered electors | | 222,703 | | ▲18.11 |
| NCP hold | | Swing | ▲3.49 | |

=== Assembly Election 1999 ===
1999 Maharashtra Legislative Assembly election : Satara
| Party | Candidate | Votes | % | ±% |
|---|---|---|---|---|
| NCP | Abhaysinh Shahumaharaj Bhosale | 59,780 | 49.12 | New |
| BJP | Udayanraje Bhosale | 54,417 | 44.71 | ▼8.93 |
| INC | Uthale Babanrao Alias Laxman Sadashiv | 5,738 | 4.71 | ▼41.65 |
| CPI(M) | Mahabaleshwarkar Bhaskar Shankar | 1,260 | 1.04 | New |
| Margin of victory | | 5,363 | 4.41 | ▼2.87 |
| Turnout | | 128,638 | 68.22 | ▲4.82 |
| Total valid votes | | 121,710 | | |
| Registered electors | | 188,559 | | ▲2.44 |
| NCP gain from BJP | | Swing | ▼4.52 | |

=== Assembly By-election 1998 ===
1998 Maharashtra Legislative Assembly by-election : Satara
| Party | Candidate | Votes | % | ±% |
|---|---|---|---|---|
| BJP | Udayanraje Bhosale | 58,974 | 53.64 | New |
| INC | Shivendra Raje Bhosale | 50,974 | 46.36 | ▼15.80 |
| Margin of victory | | 8,000 | 7.28 | ▼32.07 |
| Turnout | | 110,954 | 60.28 | ▼11.23 |
| Total valid votes | | 109,948 | | |
| Registered electors | | 184,074 | | ▼2.22 |
| BJP gain from INC | | Swing | ▼8.53 | |

=== Assembly Election 1995 ===
1995 Maharashtra Legislative Assembly election : Satara
| Party | Candidate | Votes | % | ±% |
|---|---|---|---|---|
| INC | Abhaysinh Shahumaharaj Bhosale | 83,053 | 62.17 | ▼2.10 |
| Independent | Ghorpade Bhimrao Shamrao | 30,485 | 22.82 | New |
| SS | Yadav Hanmantrao Genaba | 13,000 | 9.73 | ▼23.53 |
| CPI(M) | Mahableshwarkar Bhaskar Shankar | 3,598 | 2.69 | ▲0.58 |
| Independent | Kazi Nizam Papa | 1,112 | 0.83 | New |
| Margin of victory | | 52,568 | 39.35 | ▲8.34 |
| Turnout | | 136,791 | 72.66 | ▲2.76 |
| Total valid votes | | 133,597 | | |
| Registered electors | | 188,262 | | ▲10.12 |
| INC hold | | Swing | ▼2.10 | |

=== Assembly Election 1990 ===
1990 Maharashtra Legislative Assembly election : Satara
| Party | Candidate | Votes | % | ±% |
|---|---|---|---|---|
| INC | Abhaysinh Shahumaharaj Bhosale | 74,936 | 64.27 | ▼4.18 |
| SS | Bhonsale Rajmata Kalpanarraje Pratapsinh Maharaj | 38,783 | 33.26 | New |
| CPI(M) | Mahabaleshwarkar Bhaskar Alias Prabhakar Shankar | 2,466 | 2.11 | New |
| Margin of victory | | 36,153 | 31.01 | ▼7.26 |
| Turnout | | 118,137 | 69.10 | ▼1.89 |
| Total valid votes | | 116,597 | | |
| Registered electors | | 170,958 | | ▲35.19 |
| INC hold | | Swing | ▼4.18 | |

=== Assembly Election 1985 ===
1985 Maharashtra Legislative Assembly election : Satara
| Party | Candidate | Votes | % | ±% |
|---|---|---|---|---|
| INC | Abhaysinh Shahumaharaj Bhosale | 60,677 | 68.45 | New |
| IC(S) | Jadhav Sarjerao Vithalrao | 26,754 | 30.18 | New |
| Margin of victory | | 33,923 | 38.27 | ▲27.43 |
| Turnout | | 89,949 | 71.13 | ▲7.91 |
| Total valid votes | | 88,643 | | |
| Registered electors | | 126,459 | | ▲8.48 |
| INC gain from INC(I) | | Swing | ▲18.72 | |

=== Assembly Election 1980 ===
1980 Maharashtra Legislative Assembly election : Satara
| Party | Candidate | Votes | % | ±% |
|---|---|---|---|---|
| INC(I) | Abhaysinh Shahumaharaj Bhosale | 36,048 | 49.73 | New |
| INC(U) | Uthale Babanrao Alias Laxman Sadashiv | 28,193 | 38.89 | New |
| BJP | Gajabhau Kulkarni | 6,180 | 8.53 | New |
| Independent | Nikam Ramrao Dhondiba | 2,067 | 2.85 | New |
| Margin of victory | | 7,855 | 10.84 | ▲1.11 |
| Turnout | | 73,864 | 63.36 | ▼7.18 |
| Total valid votes | | 72,488 | | |
| Registered electors | | 116,574 | | ▲7.92 |
| INC(I) gain from JP | | Swing | ▼0.39 | |

=== Assembly Election 1978 ===
1978 Maharashtra Legislative Assembly election : Satara
| Party | Candidate | Votes | % | ±% |
|---|---|---|---|---|
| JP | Abhaysinh Shahumaharaj Bhosale | 37,549 | 50.12 | New |
| INC | Ghorpade Baburao Balasaheb | 30,263 | 40.39 | ▼28.78 |
| Independent | Nikam Ramrao Dhondiba | 2,612 | 3.49 | New |
| Independent | Yadav Hanmant Kesu | 1,357 | 1.81 | New |
| Independent | Uthale Vijaysinh Ramchandra | 1,218 | 1.63 | New |
| Independent | Bhore Divakar Vishnupant | 668 | 0.89 | New |
| Independent | Mane Shivram Laxman | 649 | 0.87 | New |
| Margin of victory | | 7,286 | 9.72 | ▼37.57 |
| Turnout | | 76,463 | 70.79 | ▲2.32 |
| Total valid votes | | 74,924 | | |
| Registered electors | | 108,018 | | ▲21.28 |
| JP gain from INC | | Swing | ▼19.06 | |

=== Assembly Election 1972 ===
1972 Maharashtra Legislative Assembly election : Satara
| Party | Candidate | Votes | % | ±% |
|---|---|---|---|---|
| INC | Jagtap Dhondiram Shidoji | 41,307 | 69.17 | ▲4.51 |
| INC(O) | Pawar Narayanrao Rajaram | 13,068 | 21.88 | New |
| ABJS | Vinayakrao B. Dhawale | 4,335 | 7.26 | ▲0.86 |
| Independent | Rasal Dinkar Shripati | 535 | 0.90 | New |
| Independent | Bhagwat Sonappa Balappa | 469 | 0.79 | New |
| Margin of victory | | 28,239 | 47.29 | ▲9.70 |
| Turnout | | 61,265 | 68.79 | ▼0.64 |
| Total valid votes | | 59,714 | | |
| Registered electors | | 89,065 | | ▲14.70 |
| INC hold | | Swing | ▲4.51 | |

=== Assembly Election 1967 ===
1967 Maharashtra Legislative Assembly election : Satara
| Party | Candidate | Votes | % | ±% |
|---|---|---|---|---|
| INC | Dhondiram Shidoji Jagtap | 33,984 | 64.66 | ▼4.33 |
| PWPI | N. R. Pawar | 14,228 | 27.07 | New |
| ABJS | Vinayakrao B. Dhawale | 3,363 | 6.40 | ▲1.56 |
| Independent | N. P. Mane | 980 | 1.86 | New |
| Margin of victory | | 19,756 | 37.59 | ▼7.88 |
| Turnout | | 56,045 | 72.18 | ▼4.68 |
| Total valid votes | | 52,555 | | |
| Registered electors | | 77,651 | | ▲9.56 |
| INC hold | | Swing | ▼4.33 | |

=== Assembly Election 1962 ===
1962 Maharashtra Legislative Assembly election : Satara
| Party | Candidate | Votes | % | ±% |
|---|---|---|---|---|
| INC | Dhondiram Shidoji Jagtap | 35,390 | 69.00 | ▲39.8 |
| Independent | Vithalrao Nanasaheb Patil | 12,068 | 23.53 | New |
| ABJS | Dadasaheb Madhavrao Jadhav | 2,482 | 4.84 | New |
| Independent | Yaduveer Sakharam Ghogale | 956 | 1.86 | New |
| Independent | Mahadu Rangaji Kambale | 395 | 0.77 | New |
| Margin of victory | | 23,322 | 45.47 | ▲3.87 |
| Turnout | | 53,555 | 75.56 | ▲11.35 |
| Total valid votes | | 51,291 | | |
| Registered electors | | 70,878 | | ▲15.09 |
| INC gain from Independent | | Swing | ▼1.80 | |

=== Assembly Election 1957 ===
1957 Bombay State Legislative Assembly election : Satara
| Party | Candidate | Votes | % | ±% |
|---|---|---|---|---|
| Independent | Patil Vithal Nanasaheb | 26,602 | 70.80 | New |
| INC | Ghorpade Baburao Balasaheb | 10,971 | 29.20 | New |
| Margin of victory | | 15,631 | 41.60 | |
| Turnout | | 37,573 | 61.01 | |
| Total valid votes | | 37,573 | | |
| Registered electors | | 61,583 | | |
| Independent win (new seat) | | | | |

== See also ==
- List of constituencies of Maharashtra Legislative Assembly
