= Laxmanrao Pandurang Patil =

Indian politician

Laxmanrao Pandurang Jadhav (Patil)

Member of Parliament, Lok Sabha
- In office 1999–2009
- Preceded by: Abhaysinhraje Bhosale
- Succeeded by: Udayanraje Bhosale
- Constituency: Satara

Personal details
- Born: 25 February 1938 Bopegaon, Satara District, Maharashtra
- Died: 17 January 2019 (aged 80)
- Party: Nationalist Congress Party
- Spouse: Suman Tai Patil
- Children: 3 sons Makrand Jadhav - Patil, Milind Patil and Nitin Jadhav-Patil
- Education: Matriculate
- Alma mater: Dravida High School, Wai
- Profession: Agriculturist

Laxmanrao Pandurang Jadhav (Patil) (born 25 February 1938) was a member of the 13th Lok Sabha and 14th Lok Sabha of India till 2009. He represented the Satara constituency of Maharashtra and is a member of the Nationalist Congress Party (NCP) political party.

He was also a member of the 13th Lok Sabha from Satara. His son, Makrand Jadhav-Patil is 3 times sitting in MLA from Wai from 2009 till now And younger son Nitin Jadhav-Patil is Member of Parliament of Rajya Sabha.

== Positions held ==
- 1972-80 President, Panchayat Samiti, Wai, District. Satara, Maharashtra
- 1980-90 President, Zila Parishad, Satara, Maharashtra
- 1999 Elected to 13th Lok Sabha
  President, Nationalist Congress Party, District. Satara, Maharashtra
- 1999-2000 Member, Committee on Food, Civil Supplies and Public Distribution
- 2000 onwards Member, Consultative Committee, Ministry of Communications
