= Anil Bhaidas Patil =

Indian politician

Cabinet Minister Government of Maharashtra
- In office 2 July 2023 – 26 November 2024
- Minister: Ministry of Relief & Rehabilitation (Maharashtra); Ministry of Disaster Management (Maharashtra)
- Governor: Ramesh Bais; C. P. Radhakrishnan
- Cabinet: Eknath Shinde ministry
- Chief Minister: Eknath Shinde
- Deputy CM: Devendra Fadnavis (First); Ajit Pawar (Second)
- Guardian Minister: Nandurbar district
- Preceded by: Eknath Shinde; Chief Minister
- Succeeded by: Makrand Jadhav - Patil

Member of Legislative Assembly Maharashtra
- Incumbent
- Assumed office 2019
- Preceded by: Shirish Hiralal Chaudhari
- Constituency: Amalner (Vidhan Sabha constituency)

Personal details
- Party: Nationalist Congress Party
- Profession: Politician

Anil Bhaidas Patil is an Indian politician and a member of Eknath Shinde ministry, and member of 14th Maharashtra Legislative Assembly. He represents Amalner (Vidhan Sabha constituency) and he belongs to the Nationalist Congress Party. He is the only elected MLA in the district belonging to Nationalist Congress Party. He has won the 15th Maharashtra Assembly elections from the Amalner constituency, becoming a two time MLA from the seat.
