= Parth Pawar =

Indian politician (born 1990)

Member of Parliament, Rajya Sabha
- Incumbent
- Assumed office 3 April 2026
- Preceded by: Fouzia Khan
- Constituency: Maharashtra

Personal details
- Born: Parth Ajit Pawar; 21 March 1990 (age 36) Bombay (Mumbai), Maharashtra, India
- Party: Nationalist Congress Party
- Parents: Ajit Pawar (father); Sunetra Pawar (mother)
- Relatives: Sharad Pawar (grandfather); Jay Pawar (brother); Rohit Rajendra Pawar (cousin); Supriya Sule (aunt)
- Occupation: Politician; businessman

Parth Ajit Pawar (born 21 March 1990) is an Indian politician and businessman from Maharashtra, who is serving as Member of Parliament, Rajya Sabha from Maharashtra state since April 2026. He is the elder son of veteran politician Ajit Pawar and Maharashtra Deputy CM Sunetra Pawar.

== Early and personal life ==
Pawar was born on 21 March 1990 in Bombay (Mumbai), Maharashtra. He is the elder son of the longest-serving Deputy Chief Minister Ajit Pawar and the current Deputy Chief Minister Sunetra Pawar, and his grand uncle Sharad Pawar is a veteran deeply involved in both state and national politics. His younger brother Jay Pawar is a businessman.

== Political career ==
Pawar entered politics in 2019 general election and contested from Maval Lok Sabha Constituency but lost the election by a margin of 2,15,913 votes. In 2026 his politics took place when his father died in an aircraft crash on 28 January 2026 in Baramati. His mother immediately succeeded in his state roles and Parth Pawar was nominated by the NCP to contest 2026 Rajya Sabha elections and serve as MP for Maharashtra. He was elected on 16 March 2026 and assumed office on 3 April 2026 after his predecessor's term expired the previous day. He took his oath at the Parliament House in New Delhi on 9 April 2026, administed by Rajya Sabha Chairman C. P. Radhakrishnan with presence of his mother Sunetra, NCP MPs Praful Patel and Sunil Tatkare, INC MP Jairam Ramesh and Leader of the House J. P. Nadda.
