= Prataprao Baburao Bhosale =

Indian politician (1934–2024)

Prataprao Bhosale

Member of Maharashtra Legislative Assembly
- In office 1967–1985
- Preceded by: Dadasaheb Jagtap
- Succeeded by: Madanrao Pisal
- Constituency: Wai

Member of Parliament, Lok Sabha
- In office 1984–1996
- Preceded by: Yashwantrao Chavan
- Succeeded by: Hindurao Naik Nimbalkar
- Constituency: Satara

President of Maharashtra Pradesh Congress Committee
- In office 1998–2000
- Preceded by: Ranjeet Deshmukh
- Succeeded by: Govindrao Adik

Personal details
- Born: 25 October 1934 Bhuinj, Bombay Presidency, British India
- Died: 19 May 2024 (aged 89) Bhuinj, Maharashtra, India
- Party: Indian National Congress
- Other political affiliations: Indian National Congress (Urs)
- Spouse: Shantabai Bhosale
- Children: Madan Bhosale
- Education: P.S.C.
- Alma mater: Jagannath Barooah College
- Profession: Agriculturist, Political and Social Worker

Prataprao Baburao Bhosale (25 October 1934 – 19 May 2024) was an Indian politician. He was a leader of Indian National Congress from Maharashtra. He served as member of the Lok Sabha representing Satara constituency. He was elected to the 8th, 9th and 10th Lok Sabha. He was the Member of Maharashtra Legislative Assembly from Wai constituency from 1967 to 1985 and also served in the state cabinet in various ministries. Bhosale died on 19 May 2024, at the age of 89.
