= Karad South Assembly constituency =

Constituency of the Maharashtra legislative assembly in India

Coordinates: 17.26°N 74.19°E

Karad South
- Constituency No. 260 for the Maharashtra Legislative Assembly

Constituency details
- Country: India
- Region: Western India
- State: Maharashtra
- District: Satara
- Lok Sabha constituency: Satara
- Established: 1951
- Total electors: 316,060
- Reservation: None

Member of Legislative Assembly
- 15th Maharashtra Legislative Assembly
- Incumbent Atulbaba Suresh Bhosale
- Party: BJP
- Elected year: 2024

Karad South Assembly constituency of Maharashtra Vidhan Sabha is one of the constituencies located in the Satara district.

It is a part of the Satara (Lok Sabha constituency), along with five other assembly constituencies, viz Wai, Karad North, Koregaon, Satara and Patan from the Satara district.

== Members of the Legislative Assembly ==
Election	Member	Party
1952	Yashwantrao Jijoba Mohite	Peasants and Workers Party of India
1957	Yashwantrao Jijoba Mohite	Peasants and Workers Party of India
1962	Yashwantrao Jijoba Mohite	Indian National Congress
1967	Yashwantrao Jijoba Mohite	Indian National Congress
1972	Yashwantrao Jijoba Mohite	Indian National Congress
1978	Yashwantrao Jijoba Mohite	Indian National Congress
1980	Vilasrao (Kaka) Patil-Undalkar	Indian National Congress (U)
1985	Vilasrao (Kaka) Patil-Undalkar	Indian National Congress
1990	Vilasrao (Kaka) Patil-Undalkar	Indian National Congress
1995	Vilasrao (Kaka) Patil-Undalkar	Indian National Congress
1999	Vilasrao (Kaka) Patil-Undalkar	Indian National Congress
2004	Vilasrao (Kaka) Patil-Undalkar	Indian National Congress
2009	Vilasrao (Kaka) Patil-Undalkar	Indian National Congress
2014	Prithviraj Dajisaheb Chavan	Indian National Congress
2019	Prithviraj Dajisaheb Chavan	Indian National Congress
2024	Dr. Atulbaba Suresh Bhosale	Bharatiya Janata Party

== Election results ==
=== Assembly Election 2024 ===
2024 Maharashtra Legislative Assembly election : Karad South
Party	Candidate	Votes	%	±%
BJP	Dr. Atulbaba Suresh Bhosale	139,505	57.59	▲17.92
INC	Prithviraj Dajisaheb Chavan	100,150	41.34	▼2.69
NOTA	None of the above	859	0.35	▲0.07
Margin of victory		39,355	16.25	▲11.89
Turnout		243,101	76.92	▲4.98
Total valid votes		242,242		
Registered electors		316,060		▲8.05
BJP gain from INC		Swing	▲13.56	

=== Assembly Election 2019 ===
2019 Maharashtra Legislative Assembly election : Karad South
Party	Candidate	Votes	%	±%
INC	Prithviraj Dajisaheb Chavan	92,296	44.03	▲5.90
BJP	Dr. Atulbaba Suresh Bhosale	83,166	39.67	▲10.57
Independent	Adv. Udaysinh Vilasrao Patil-Undalkar	29,401	14.02	New
NOTA	None of the above	584	0.28	▼0.19
Margin of victory		9,130	4.36	▼3.79
Turnout		210,436	71.94	▼1.36
Total valid votes		209,640		
Registered electors		292,525		▲5.93
INC hold		Swing	▲5.90	

=== Assembly Election 2014 ===
2014 Maharashtra Legislative Assembly election : Karad South
Party	Candidate	Votes	%	±%
INC	Prithviraj Dajisaheb Chavan	76,831	38.13	▼11.22
Independent	Vilasrao (Kaka) Patil-Undalkar	60,413	29.99	New
BJP	Dr. Atulbaba Suresh Bhosale	58,621	29.10	▲23.27
SS	Dr. Ajeenkya Patil	2,373	1.18	New
NOTA	None of the above	939	0.47	New
Margin of victory		16,418	8.15	▼0.73
Turnout		202,416	73.30	▲6.66
Total valid votes		201,473		
Registered electors		276,153		▲9.38
INC hold		Swing	▼11.22	

=== Assembly Election 2009 ===
2009 Maharashtra Legislative Assembly election : Karad South
Party	Candidate	Votes	%	±%
INC	Vilasrao (Kaka) Patil-Undhalkar	82,857	49.35	▼34.72
Independent	Vilasrao Govindrao Patil	67,944	40.47	New
BJP	Bharat Baburao Patil	9,784	5.83	New
SBP	Mohite Rajendra Prataprao	1,950	1.16	New
BSP	Thorawade Ananda Ramesh	1,775	1.06	▼2.67
Independent	Shabbir Rasul Mujawar	1,236	0.74	New
Independent	Rajendra Shivaji Pawar	1,143	0.68	New
Margin of victory		14,913	8.88	▼65.17
Turnout		168,231	66.64	▼1.38
Total valid votes		167,892		
Registered electors		252,463		▲33.15
INC hold		Swing	▼34.72	

=== Assembly Election 2004 ===
2004 Maharashtra Legislative Assembly election : Karad South
Party	Candidate	Votes	%	±%
INC	Vilasrao Balkrishna Patil	108,367	84.07	▲30.24
SS	Subhedar Kamlakar Gopal	12,914	10.02	▼2.58
BSP	Rasal Sadashiv Sitaram	4,805	3.73	New
Independent	Yelve Banubai Dagadu	2,821	2.19	New
Margin of victory		95,453	74.05	▲53.79
Turnout		128,981	68.02	▼3.62
Total valid votes		128,907		
Registered electors		189,610		▲11.53
INC hold		Swing	▲30.24	

=== Assembly Election 1999 ===
1999 Maharashtra Legislative Assembly election : Karad South
Party	Candidate	Votes	%	±%
INC	Vilasrao Balkrishna Patil	62,795	53.83	▼0.10
NCP	Vilasrao Govind Patil	39,161	33.57	New
SS	Bhavake Ashok Jagannath	14,703	12.60	▲5.85
Margin of victory		23,634	20.26	▲3.65
Turnout		121,793	71.64	▼5.78
Total valid votes		116,659		
Registered electors		170,009		▲0.24
INC hold		Swing	▼0.10	

=== Assembly Election 1995 ===
1995 Maharashtra Legislative Assembly election : Karad South
Party	Candidate	Votes	%	±%
INC	Vilasrao Balkrishna Patil	69,386	53.93	▼2.99
Independent	Mohite Indrajit Yeshwantrao	48,014	37.32	New
SS	Chandrakant Vishnu Pawar	8,684	6.75	▼2.25
BBM	Bansode Ashok Babu	1,264	0.98	New
Margin of victory		21,372	16.61	▼11.32
Turnout		131,315	77.42	▲7.17
Total valid votes		128,659		
Registered electors		169,607		▲4.40
INC hold		Swing	▼2.99	

=== Assembly Election 1990 ===
1990 Maharashtra Legislative Assembly election : Karad South
Party	Candidate	Votes	%	±%
INC	Vilasrao (Kaka) Patil-Undhalkar	64,100	56.92	▲1.47
Independent	Dr. Indrajit Yeshwantrao Mohite	32,643	28.99	New
SS	Chandrakant Vishnu Pawar	10,137	9.00	New
Independent	Bandasode Suresh Hamrao	3,718	3.30	New
JD	Hogale Ramchandra Ganapati	2,016	1.79	New
Margin of victory		31,457	27.93	▲15.88
Turnout		114,132	70.25	▼3.20
Total valid votes		112,614		
Registered electors		162,456		▲20.35
INC hold		Swing	▲1.47	

=== Assembly Election 1985 ===
1985 Maharashtra Legislative Assembly election : Karad South
Party	Candidate	Votes	%	±%
INC	Vilasrao Balkrishna Patil	54,159	55.45	New
IC(S)	Vilasrao Govind Patil	42,390	43.40	New
Independent	Gaikwad Sampat Sitaram	672	0.69	New
Margin of victory		11,769	12.05	▼14.46
Turnout		99,149	73.45	▲6.11
Total valid votes		97,668		
Registered electors		134,991		▲14.10
INC gain from INC(U)		Swing	▲0.11	

=== Assembly Election 1980 ===
1980 Maharashtra Legislative Assembly election : Karad South
Party	Candidate	Votes	%	±%
INC(U)	Vilasrao Balkrishna Patil	43,348	55.34	New
Independent	Patil Bhimmrao Dhondiram	22,586	28.84	New
INC(I)	Nimkam Balkrishna Parasu Alias Balasaheb Patil Sherekar	11,078	14.14	▲12.22
Independent	Kambale Tanaji Dadu	868	1.11	New
Margin of victory		20,762	26.51	▼8.31
Turnout		79,675	67.34	▼4.44
Total valid votes		78,327		
Registered electors		118,310		▲7.98
INC(U) gain from INC		Swing	▼8.52	

=== Assembly Election 1978 ===
1978 Maharashtra Legislative Assembly election : Karad South
Party	Candidate	Votes	%	±%
INC	Yashwantrao Jijoba Mohite	48,885	63.86	▲10.43
PWPI	Mohite Shankarrao Pandurangrao	22,228	29.04	▼17.53
Independent	Kambale Tanaji Dadu	1,627	2.13	New
INC(I)	Patil Ramji Krishna	1,473	1.92	New
CPI	Inamdar Shaikhkala Bandusaheb	1,102	1.44	New
Independent	Patil ( Nikam ) Sarjerao Dhondi	994	1.30	New
Margin of victory		26,657	34.82	▲27.96
Turnout		78,649	71.78	▲1.28
Total valid votes		76,552		
Registered electors		109,564		▲17.33
INC hold		Swing	▲10.43	

=== Assembly Election 1972 ===
1972 Maharashtra Legislative Assembly election : Karad South
Party	Candidate	Votes	%	±%
INC	Yashwantrao Jijoba Mohite	34,397	53.43	▼28.20
PWPI	Shankarrao P. Mohite	29,980	46.57	New
Margin of victory		4,417	6.86	▼56.41
Turnout		65,829	70.50	▲2.52
Total valid votes		64,377		
Registered electors		93,381		▲22.21
INC hold		Swing	▼28.20	

=== Assembly Election 1967 ===
1967 Maharashtra Legislative Assembly election : Karad South
Party	Candidate	Votes	%	±%
INC	Yashwantrao Jijoba Mohite	40,633	81.63	▲2.43
CPI	R. R. Patil	9,142	18.37	New
Margin of victory		31,491	63.27	▲0.51
Turnout		51,944	67.98	▼2.04
Total valid votes		49,775		
Registered electors		76,412		▲22.36
INC hold		Swing	▲2.43	

=== Assembly Election 1962 ===
1962 Maharashtra Legislative Assembly election : Karad South
Party	Candidate	Votes	%	±%
INC	Yashwantrao Jijoba Mohite	33,390	79.20	▲43.20
PWPI	Vasantrao Alias Dattajirao Keru Patil	6,929	16.44	▼47.56
SWA	Ranganath Appa Patil	1,159	2.75	New
Independent	Tukaramsa Khirasa Dhonadi	682	1.62	New
Margin of victory		26,461	62.76	▲34.76
Turnout		43,730	70.02	▼2.70
Total valid votes		42,160		
Registered electors		62,451		▲18.81
INC gain from PWPI		Swing	▲15.20	

=== Assembly Election 1957 ===
1957 Bombay State Legislative Assembly election : Karad South
Party	Candidate	Votes	%	±%
PWPI	Yashwantrao Jijoba Mohite	24,466	64.00	▲23.95
INC	Jagtap Dhondiram Sidoji	13,761	36.00	▲1.27
Margin of victory		10,705	28.00	▲22.68
Turnout		38,227	72.72	▲2.67
Total valid votes		38,227		
Registered electors		52,564		▲9.07
PWPI hold		Swing	▲23.95	

=== Assembly Election 1952 ===
1952 Bombay State Legislative Assembly election : Karad South
Party	Candidate	Votes	%	±%
PWPI	Yashwantrao Jijoba Mohite	13,520	40.05	New
INC	Thorat Sambhajirao Marutirao	11,724	34.73	New
Kamgar Kisan Paksha	Inamdar Shaikhkala Bandusaheb	6,177	18.30	New
Independent	Patil Damo Shivaram	2,336	6.92	New
Margin of victory		1,796	5.32	
Turnout		33,757	70.05	
Total valid votes		33,757		
Registered electors		48,193		
PWPI win (new seat)				

== See also ==
- List of constituencies of Maharashtra Legislative Assembly
- Karad
