= Fouzia Khan =

Indian politician (born 1957)

Fauzia Khan

Member of Parliament, Rajya Sabha
- In office 3 April 2020 – 2 April 2026
- Preceded by: Majeed Memon
- Succeeded by: Parth Pawar
- Constituency: Maharashtra

National President of Nationalist Mahila Congress
- Incumbent
- Assumed office 20 April 2018
- National President: Sharad Pawar

Member of Maharashtra State Board for Waqf
- Incumbent
- Assumed office 2009

Minister of State in Maharashtra
- In office 2009–2014
- In office 2008–2009

Member of Maharashtra Legislative Council
- In office 21 February 2002 – 20 February 2008
- Constituency: Nominated
- In office 2008–2014
- Constituency: Nominated

Personal details
- Born: 19 February 1957 (age 69) Aurangabad, Bombay State, India
- Party: NCP(SP)
- Spouse: Tahseen Ahmed Khan
- Children: 2 (1 son & 1 daughter)
- Education: M.A, M.Phil, Ph.D
- Occupation: Agriculturist; educationist; politician
- Sansad Ratna Awardee (2022)

Dr. Fauzia Tahseen Khan (born 19 February 1957), better known as Fouzia Khan, is an Indian politician of the Nationalist Congress Party (Sharadchandra Pawar). She was a member of the Rajya Sabha the upper house of Indian Parliament from Maharashtra. She is the National president of Nationalist Mahila Congress (NCP's Women's wing), an Ex-Minister of State of Government of Maharashtra in India. She was two time M.L.C. i.e. member of Legislative Council the upper house of Maharashtra Legislature. Convent-educated Khan is the first Muslim woman in the state who has served as minister in the Maharashtra government.

== Portfolio held ==
She was minister of state (junior minister) with portfolios for School Education, Women & Child Development, Cultural Affairs, General Administration, Information & Public Relations, Minorities Development (including Aukaf), and Protocol.

== Political profile ==
Fauzia Khan belongs Nationalist Congress Party (Sharadchandra Pawar). She has served two times as member of legislative council of Maharashtra. Her paternal home is in Aurangabad, Maharashtra. She moved to Parbhani after marriage where she started her political career by contesting the election for the post of President of Parbhani Municipal Council.

== Contributions ==
Fauzia Khan heads the Federation of All Maharashtra Minority Education Organisation (FAME) and runs several educational institutions in Parbhani.
In the year 2008 she donated 5 acres of land to develop off-campus educational complex by Maulana Azad National Urdu University (MANUU) at Aurangabad.
As a minister in Govt. of Maharashtra she was instrumental in identifying a 332-acre site for Aligarh Muslim University (AMU) Maharashtra Center at Khuldabad near Aurangabad.
