= Wai Assembly constituency =

Constituency of the Maharashtra legislative assembly in India

Coordinates: 17.95°N 73.89°E

Wai
- Constituency No. 256 for the Maharashtra Legislative Assembly

Constituency details
- Country: India
- Region: Western India
- State: Maharashtra
- District: Satara
- Lok Sabha constituency: Satara
- Established: 1955
- Total electors: 348,113
- Reservation: None

Member of Legislative Assembly
- 15th Maharashtra Legislative Assembly
- Incumbent Makrand Jadhav - Patil
- Party: NCP
- Alliance: NDA
- Elected year: 2024

Wai Assembly constituency is an assembly constituency of the Maharashtra Legislative Assembly in Satara district, Maharashtra, India.

It is a part of Satara Lok Sabha constituency, along with five other assembly constituencies in Satara district, namely Patan, Karad South, Koregaon, Satara and Karad North.

== Members of Legislative Assembly ==
Year	Member	Party
1957	Dadasaheb Khasherao Jagtap	Peasants and Workers Party of India
1962	Dadasaheb Khasherao Jagtap	Indian National Congress
1967	Prataprao Baburao Bhosale	Indian National Congress
1972	Prataprao Baburao Bhosale	Indian National Congress
1978	Prataprao Baburao Bhosale	Indian National Congress
1980	Prataprao Baburao Bhosale	Indian National Congress
1985	Madanrao Prataprao Pisal	Indian National Congress
1990	Madanrao Prataprao Pisal	Indian National Congress
1995	Madanrao Prataprao Pisal	Independent politician
1999	Madanrao Prataprao Pisal	Nationalist Congress Party
2004	Madan Prataprao Bhosale	Independent politician
2009	Makrand Laxmanrao Jadhav-Patil	Independent politician
2014	Makrand Laxmanrao Jadhav-Patil	Nationalist Congress Party
2019	Makrand Laxmanrao Jadhav-Patil	Nationalist Congress Party
2024	Makrand Laxmanrao Jadhav-Patil	Nationalist Congress Party

== Election results ==
=== Assembly Election 2024 ===
2024 Maharashtra Legislative Assembly election : Wai
Party	Candidate	Votes	%	±%
NCP	Makrand Laxmanrao Jadhav-Patil	140,971	59.98%	New
NCP-SP	Arunadevi Shashikant Pisal	79,579	33.86%	New
Independent	Purushottam Bajirao Jadhav	4,695	2.00%	New
Independent	Ganesh Dada Keskar	2,301	0.98%	New
Independent	Suhas Eknath More	1,904	0.81%	New
VBA	Anil Maruti Lohar	1,817	0.77%	▼0.77
NOTA	None of the Above	1,786	0.76%	▲0.16
Margin of victory		61,392	26.12%	▲6.85
Turnout		236,827	68.03%	▼0.67
Total valid votes		235,041		
Registered electors		348,113		▲4.70
NCP gain from NCP		Swing	▲2.37	

=== Assembly Election 2019 ===
2019 Maharashtra Legislative Assembly election : Wai
Party	Candidate	Votes	%	±%
NCP	Makrand Laxmanrao Jadhav-Patil	130,486	57.60%	▲10.97
BJP	Madanrao Prataprao Pisal	86,839	38.34%	▲26.70
VBA	Ramdas Bhiva Mahanawar	3,500	1.55%	New
BSP	Dipak Keshav Kakade	1,761	0.78%	New
CPI	Dhanraj Maruti Kamble	1,685	0.74%	New
NOTA	None of the Above	1,358	0.60%	▼0.01
Margin of victory		43,647	19.27%	▲1.44
Turnout		228,442	68.70%	▼0.10
Total valid votes		226,525		
Registered electors		332,498		▲5.39
NCP hold		Swing	▲10.97	

=== Assembly Election 2014 ===
2014 Maharashtra Legislative Assembly election : Wai
Party	Candidate	Votes	%	±%
NCP	Makrand Laxmanrao Jadhav-Patil	101,218	46.63%	New
INC	Madan Prataprao Bhosale	62,516	28.80%	▼0.93
BJP	Purushottam Bajirao Jadhav	25,255	11.63%	New
SS	Bavalekar Dattaray Maruti(D.M)	23,343	10.75%	▼7.09
Independent	Sanjay Namdev Gaikwad	1,362	0.63%	New
NOTA	None of the Above	1,325	0.61%	New
Margin of victory		38,702	17.83%	▲6.84
Turnout		218,446	69.24%	▼1.56
Total valid votes		217,067		
Registered electors		315,481		▲11.75
NCP gain from Independent		Swing	▲5.91	

=== Assembly Election 2009 ===
2009 Maharashtra Legislative Assembly election : Wai
Party	Candidate	Votes	%	±%
Independent	Makrand Laxmanrao Jadhav-Patil	80,887	40.72%	New
INC	Madan Prataprao Bhosale	59,062	29.73%	New
SS	Purushottam Bajirao Jadhav	35,452	17.85%	▼17.89
Independent	Nitinkumar Laxmanrao Bhargude Patil	8,716	4.39%	New
RPI(A)	Ashokrao Vaman Gaikwad	8,025	4.04%	New
MNS	Kharat Raju Bhagwan	2,565	1.29%	New
Independent	Sabale Sudha Sampat	1,534	0.77%	New
Margin of victory		21,825	10.99%	▼5.11
Turnout		199,076	70.52%	▼5.03
Total valid votes		198,654		
Registered electors		282,316		▲66.45
Independent gain from NCP		Swing	▼29.06	

=== Assembly Election 2004 ===
2004 Maharashtra Legislative Assembly election : WAI
Party	Candidate	Votes	%	±%
Independent	Madanrao Prataprao Bhosale	68,660	53.69%	▲27.98
NCP	Makrand Laxmanrao Jadhav-Patil	50,395	39.41%	▼2.40
SBP	Dilip Yeshwant Mandhare	4,153	3.30%	▲17.81
BSP	Mohan Parshuram Gaikwad	2,464	1.90%	New
Margin of victory		18,265	14.30%	
Turnout		127,933	75.43%	▲3.07
Total valid votes		127,888		
Registered electors		169,614		▲18.77
NCP hold		Swing	▲27.98	

=== Assembly Election 1999 ===
1999 Maharashtra Legislative Assembly election : WAI
Party	Candidate	Votes	%	±%
NCP	Madanrao Prataprao Pisal	43,181	41.80%	New
INC	Madanrao Prataprao Bhosale	41,326	40.01%	▲3.98
SS	Shrikant Balwant Chavan	18,519	17.93%	▲7.72
Margin of victory		1,855	1.80%	▼7.54
Turnout		107,677	75.40%	▼8.25
Total valid votes		103,302		
Registered electors		142,813		▲0.86
NCP gain from Independent		Swing	▼3.56	

=== Assembly Election 1995 ===
1995 Maharashtra Legislative Assembly election : WAI
Party	Candidate	Votes	%	±%
Independent	Madanrao Prataprao Pisal	51,761	45.36%	New
INC	Madan Prataprao Bhosale	41,103	36.02%	▼2.73
SS	Thite Pramod Shriram	11,651	10.21%	▼11.47
Independent	Gaikwad Ashokrao Wamanrao	3,100	2.72%	New
Independent	Salunkhe Hanment Jagannath	1,710	1.50%	New
Independent	Dere Shankar Apa	1,014	0.89%	New
BSP	Sapkal Maruti Tatyaba	778	0.68%	New
Margin of victory		10,658	9.34%	▼6.47
Turnout		116,345	82.17%	▲8.96
Total valid votes		114,105		
Registered electors		141,592		▲7.16
Independent gain from INC		Swing	▲6.61	

=== Assembly Election 1990 ===
1990 Maharashtra Legislative Assembly election : WAI
Party	Candidate	Votes	%	±%
INC	Madanrao Prataprao Pisal	36,680	38.76%	▼11.27
Independent	Laxmanrao Pandurang Jadhav Patil	21,713	22.94%	New
SS	Babar Gajanan Dharmshi	20,517	21.68%	New
Independent	Shelar Kondiba Dhondiba	10,547	11.14%	New
JD	Khan Dilawar Allahbux	1,933	2.04%	New
Independent	Gaikwad Lavendra Sahebrao	1,566	1.65%	New
Margin of victory		14,967	15.81%	▲14.71
Turnout		96,104	72.73%	▲1.61
Total valid votes		94,641		
Registered electors		132,131		▲21.57
INC hold		Swing	▼11.27	

=== Assembly Election 1985 ===
1985 Maharashtra Legislative Assembly election : WAI
Party	Candidate	Votes	%	±%
INC	Madanrao Ganpatrao Pisal	38,074	50.03%	New
IC(S)	Arvind Baburao Chavan	37,231	48.92%	New
Independent	Bhosale Bhimrao Baburao	635	0.83%	New
Margin of victory		843	1.11%	▼35.83
Turnout		77,128	70.96%	▲6.33
Total valid votes		76,103		
Registered electors		108,686		▲8.69
INC gain from INC(U)		Swing	▼16.60	

=== Assembly Election 1980 ===
1980 Maharashtra Legislative Assembly election : WAI
Party	Candidate	Votes	%	±%
INC(U)	Prataprao Baburao Bhosale	42,438	66.63%	New
INC(I)	Madanrao Ganpatrao Pisal	18,914	29.70%	▲14.57
BJP	Gulabrao Hariba Pawar	1,615	2.54%	New
JP	Bhosale Ramchandra Ganapatrao Alias Rambhall Bhosale	726	1.14%	▼22.49
Margin of victory		23,524	36.93%	▲4.56
Turnout		64,877	64.88%	▼9.24
Total valid votes		63,693		
Registered electors		99,996		▲7.76
INC(U) gain from INC		Swing	▲10.63	

=== Assembly Election 1978 ===
1978 Maharashtra Legislative Assembly election : WAI
Party	Candidate	Votes	%	±%
INC	Prataprao Baburao Bhosale	37,899	56.00%	▼30.73
JP	Jagtap Buvasaheb Abajirao	15,990	23.63%	New
INC(I)	Jamdade Kondiram Balwant	10,235	15.12%	New
Independent	Babar Vinayak Baburao	938	1.39%	New
Independent	More Sarjerao Genu	853	1.26%	New
Independent	Kamble Ramchandra Bhausaheb	849	1.25%	New
Independent	Laxman Waman Jadhav	507	0.75%	New
Margin of victory		21,909	32.37%	▼48.51
Turnout		69,688	75.10%	▲9.35
Total valid votes		67,678		
Registered electors		92,796		▲21.46
INC hold		Swing	▼30.73	

=== Assembly Election 1972 ===
1972 Maharashtra Legislative Assembly election : WAI
Party	Candidate	Votes	%	±%
INC	Prataprao Baburao Bhosale	42,125	86.73%	▲15.14
ABJS	Pore Arvind Balkrishna	2,840	5.85%	New
PWPI	Vithalrao S. Babar	2,524	5.20%	▼11.93
Independent	Rasal Dinkar Shripati	1,084	2.23%	New
Margin of victory		39,285	80.88%	▲26.41
Turnout		50,150	65.64%	▼16.66
Total valid votes		48,573		
Registered electors		76,399		▲32.55
INC hold		Swing	▲15.14	

=== Assembly Election 1967 ===
1967 Maharashtra Legislative Assembly election : WAI
Party	Candidate	Votes	%	±%
INC	Prataprao Baburao Bhosale	33,106	71.59%	▲9.3
PWPI	Dadasaheb Khasherao Jagtap	7,918	17.12%	▼7.11
Independent	K. K. Ghodake	2,414	5.22%	New
Independent	S. B. Jadhao	2,363	5.11%	New
Independent	S. M. Bandisode	443	0.96%	New
Margin of victory		25,188	54.47%	▲16.42
Turnout		48,680	84.46%	▲19.15
Total valid votes		46,244		
Registered electors		57,636		▼20.13
INC hold		Swing	▲9.30	

=== Assembly Election 1962 ===
1962 Maharashtra Legislative Assembly election : WAI
Party	Candidate	Votes	%	±%
INC	Dadasaheb Khasherao Jagtap	27,456	62.29%	▲18.79
PWPI	Balasaheb Bapusaheb Deshmukh	10,684	24.24%	▼32.26
Independent	Shankarrao Dagadu Jejurikar	5,139	11.66%	New
Independent	Dinkar Shripati Rasal	802	1.82%	New
Margin of victory		16,772	38.05%	▲25.04
Turnout		46,642	64.64%	▼7.71
Total valid votes		44,081		
Registered electors		72,162		▲9.27
INC gain from PWPI		Swing	▲5.78	

=== Assembly Election 1957 ===
1957 Bombay State Legislative Assembly election : Wai
Party	Candidate	Votes	%	±%
PWPI	Dadasaheb Khasherao Jagtap	25,671	56.50%	New
INC	Veer Kisan Mahadeo	19,763	43.50%	New
Margin of victory		5,908	13.00%	
Turnout		45,434	68.80%	
Total valid votes		45,434		
Registered electors		66,041		
PWPI win (new seat)				

== See also ==
- List of constituencies of Maharashtra Legislative Assembly
- Wai
