= Udayanraje Bhosale =

Indian politician

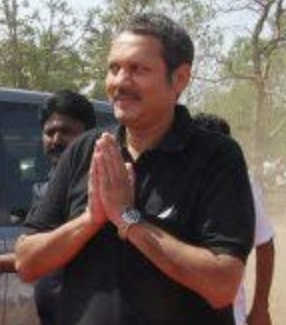
- Chhatrapati Udayanraje Bhosale

Member of Parliament, Lok Sabha
- Incumbent
- Assumed office 4 June 2024
- Preceded by: Shriniwas Patil
- Constituency: Satara, Maharashtra
- In office May 2009 – September 2019 (Resigned)
- Preceded by: Laxmanrao Pandurang Patil
- Succeeded by: Shriniwas Patil
- Constituency: Satara, Maharashtra

Member of Parliament, Rajya Sabha
- In office 3 April 2020 – 4 June 2024
- Preceded by: Amar Shankar Sable
- Succeeded by: Dhairyashil Patil
- Constituency: Maharashtra

Minister of State for Revenue, Government of Maharashtra
- In office 1998–1999

Member of the Maharashtra Legislative Assembly
- In office 05 June 1998 – 07 October 1999
- Preceded by: Abhaysinh Raje Bhosle
- Succeeded by: Abhaysinh Raje Bhosle
- Constituency: Satara

Personal details
- Born: 24 February 1966 (age 60) Nashik, Maharashtra, India
- Party: Bharatiya Janata Party (since 2019)
- Other political affiliations: Nationalist Congress Party (1999–2019)
- Spouse: Damayanti Raje Bhosale
- Relations: Shivendra Raje Bhosale (cousin)
- Children: 2
- Parent: Pratapsinh Raje Bhosale (father)
- Relatives: Bhonsle dynasty
- Education: Production Engineering (DIBM)

Udayanraje Bhosale (born 24 February 1966) is an Indian politician serving as a member of the Lok Sabha, the lower house of the Parliament of India, from Maharashtra since 2024 from Satara. He is a member of the Bharatiya Janata Party.

Bhosale is the 13th holder of the titulary title of Chhatrapati which was adopted by the Maratha king Chhatrapati Shivaji Bhosale upon his coronation in 1674.

He is addressed as Chhatrapati by some in the media, however the title is entirely ceremonial and in the role of a pretender.

== Personal life ==
Bhosale was born in Nashik to Pratapsingh and Kalpanaraje. He studied Production Engineering. He married Damayantiraje on 20 November 2003. They have a son and a daughter.

== Political career ==
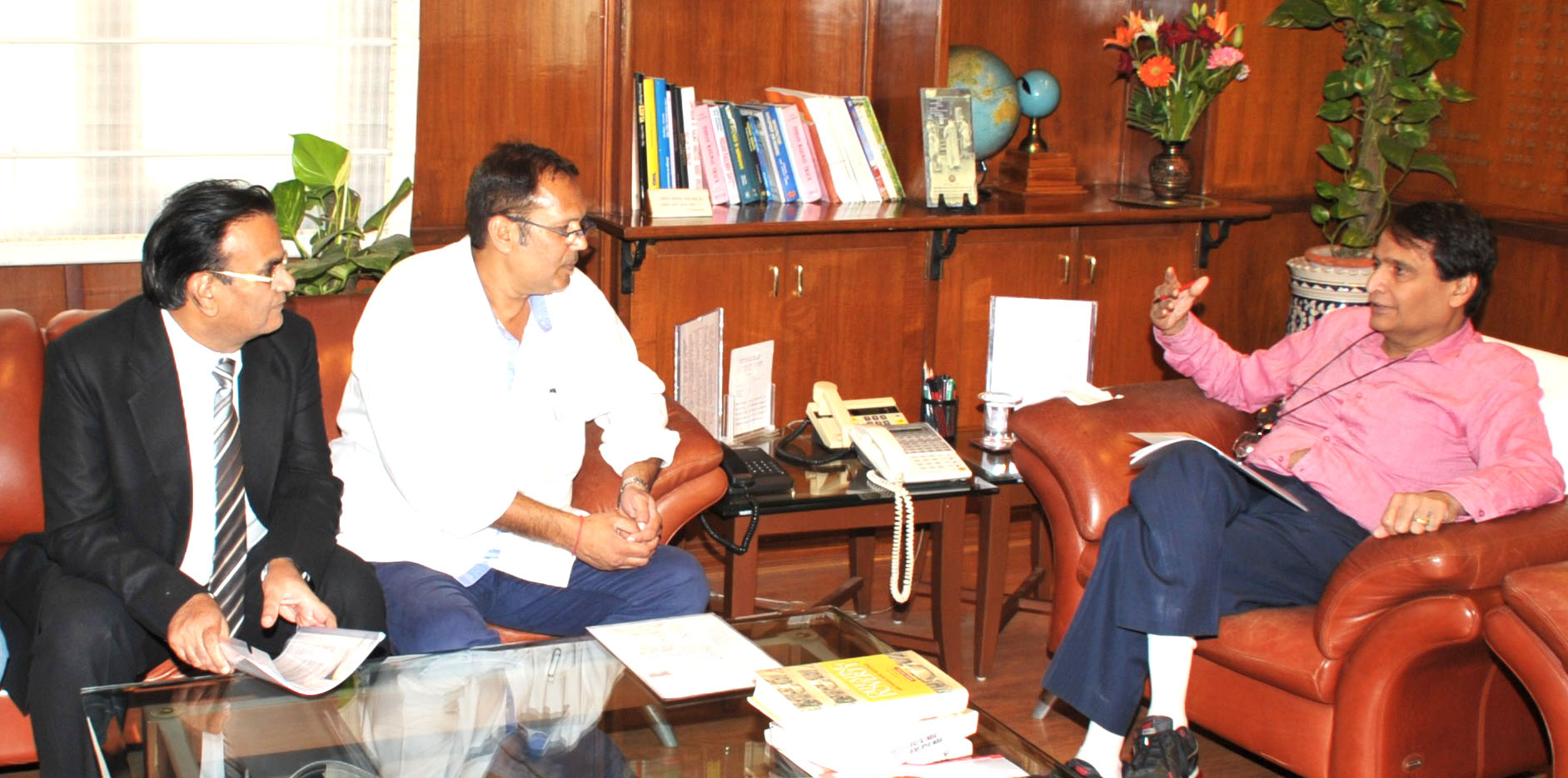
Udayanraje Bhosale with Suresh Prabhu, then Union Minister for Railways

Bhosale was a member of Bharatiya Janata Party and a member of the Maharashtra Legislative Assembly (1998-1999) and the Minister for Revenue of Maharashtra in the Sena-BJP Maharashtra government. In 2009, 2014 and 2019 parliamentary elections he was elected to the Lok Sabha as a Nationalist Congress Party candidate from Satara (Lok Sabha constituency). In September 2019, he resigned from NCP and announced his return from NCP to the BJP ahead of the Maharashtra legislative assembly elections. He lost the Lok Sabha by-poll in October 2019. In 2020 he was elected to Rajya Sabha from Maharashtra. He won from Satara Lok Sabha in 2024 election as a BJP candidate by a margin of 32,771 votes.
