= Shriniwas Patil =

Indian politician

Shriniwas Dadasaheb Patil
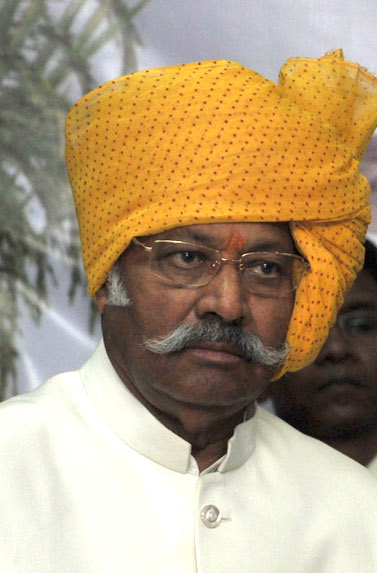

Governor of Sikkim
- In office 20 July 2013 – 26 August 2018
- Preceded by: Balmiki Prasad Singh
- Succeeded by: Ganga Prasad

Member of Parliament, Lok Sabha
- In office 24 October 2019 – 4 June 2024
- Preceded by: Udayanraje Bhosale
- Succeeded by: Udayanraje Bhosale
- Constituency: Satara
- In office 6 October 1999 – 17 May 2009
- Preceded by: Prithviraj Chavan
- Succeeded by: Constituency abolished
- Constituency: Karad

Personal details
- Born: 11 February 1941 (age 85) Satara, Bombay Presidency, British India
- Party: NCP(SP)
- Spouse: Rajanidevi
- Children: 1 son - Sarang Shriniwas Patil
- Parent(s): Dadasaheb Ramchandra Patil, Anusaya Dadasaheb Patil
- Education: Sir Parshurambhau College, Pune; University of Pune; Government Law College, Mumbai

Shriniwas Dadasaheb Patil (Marulkar) (born 11 February 1941) is an Indian politician and ex-officer of the Indian Administrative Services (IAS). He was the Member of Lok Sabha from the Satara constituency from Maharashtra, India.

Patil completed his M.A. Economics and LL.B. degree from Pune and Mumbai University respectively. He was the officer of Indian Administrative Services of 1979 batch. Thereafter he served as the collector of Beed district and Pune district. He has been deputy CEO of Maharashtra Industrial Development Corporation (MIDC).

He was elected as member of the 13th and 14th Lok Sabha of India, from 1999 to 2009 representing the Karad constituency from the Nationalist Congress Party (NCP). In 2013, he was appointed the Governor of Sikkim; the position that he continued till August 2018. He was elected as Member of Parliament for the third time by defeating former Member of Parliament Udayanraje Bhosale by over 87,000 votes in October 2019 bypolls.

Lok Sabha
Preceded by Prithviraj Chavan	Member of Parliament for Karad; 1999 – 2009	Succeeded by Constituency abolished
Political offices
Preceded by Balmiki Prasad Singh	Governor of Sikkim; 1 July 2013 – 26 August 2018	Succeeded by Ganga Prasad
