= Makrand Jadhav =

Indian politician

Makrand Jadhav - Patil

Cabinet Minister Government of Maharashtra
- Incumbent
- Assumed office 15 December 2024
- Minister: Relief and Rehabilitation
- Governor: C. P. Radhakrishnan; Acharya Devvrat additional charge
- Cabinet: Third Fadnavis ministry
- Chief Minister: Devendra Fadnavis
- Deputy CM: Eknath Shinde; Ajit Pawar (till his demise in 2026) Sunetra Pawar (from 2026)
- Guardian Minister: Buldana
- Preceded by: Anil Bhaidas Patil

Member of the Maharashtra Legislative Assembly
- Incumbent
- Assumed office 2009
- Preceded by: Madanrao Pisal
- Constituency: Wai

Personal details
- Party: Nationalist Congress Party
- Parent: Laxmanrao Pandurang Jadhav Patil
- Occupation: Politician

Makrand Laxmanrao Jadhav - Patil is a leader of Nationalist Congress Party and a member of the Maharashtra Legislative Assembly elected from Wai Assembly constituency in Satara city.

== Positions held ==
- 2019: Elected to Maharashtra Legislative Assembly.
