= Sunetra Pawar =

Indian politician (born 1963)

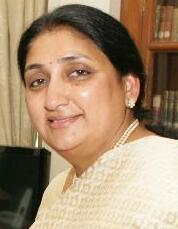
- Pawar in 2010

11th Deputy Chief Minister of Maharashtra
- Incumbent
- Assumed office 31 January 2026 Serving with Eknath Shinde
- Governor: Acharya Devvrat (additional charge); Jishnu Dev Varma
- Chief Minister: Devendra Fadnavis
- Ministry and Departments: State Excise; Sports and Youth Welfare; Minority Development and Aukaf
- Preceded by: Ajit Pawar

Member of Parliament, Rajya Sabha
- In office 21 June 2024 – 6 May 2026
- Preceded by: Praful Patel
- Succeeded by: Rajendra Jain
- Constituency: Maharashtra

National President of Nationalist Congress Party
- Incumbent
- Assumed office 26 February 2026
- Preceded by: Ajit Pawar

Guardian Minister of Pune District & Beed District in Government of Maharashtra
- Incumbent
- Assumed office 3 February 2026
- Preceded by: Ajit Pawar

Member of Maharashtra Legislative Assembly
- Incumbent
- Assumed office 4 May 2026
- Preceded by: Ajit Pawar
- Constituency: Baramati

Personal details
- Born: Sunetra Bajirao Patil; 18 October 1963 (age 63) Ter, Maharashtra, India
- Party: Nationalist Congress Party
- Spouse: Ajit Pawar (m. 1985; died 2026)
- Children: 2; including Parth
- Education: Dr. Babasaheb Ambedkar Marathwada University (BCom)
- Occupation: Politician; agriculturist; social worker; industrialist; academic administrator
- Website: https://sunetrapawar.com/
- Organisations: Baramati Textile Company; Environmental Forum of India

Sunetra Ajit Pawar (née Bajirao Patil; born 18 October 1963) is an Indian politician serving as 11th Deputy Chief Minister of Maharashtra alongside Eknath Shinde since 2026. She is the first woman to hold the office. Sunetra also serves as the National President of the Nationalist Congress Party and has previously represented Maharashtra in the Rajya Sabha. She is the widow of her predecessor, Ajit Pawar, who died in a plane crash in 2026.

== Early and personal life ==
Sunetra Bajirao Patil was born on 18 October 1963 in Ter, Maharashtra. She is the sister of Padamsinh Bajirao Patil a former senior cabinet minister and who served more than 20 years in Maharashtra government as minister and Member of Parliament representing Maharashtra in the Lok Sabha. A member of the Pawar family, she was married to Ajit Pawar from 1985 until his death in 2026. She has two sons, Jay and Parth Pawar.

== Political career ==
Sunetra entered active electoral politics during the 2024 Indian general election. She contested from the Baramati Lok Sabha constituency as a candidate of the Nationalist Congress Party against her sister-in-law and incumbent MP Supriya Sule. She lost by 150,000 votes.

Although she was unsuccessful in the general election, she was subsequently elected as a Member of Parliament, Rajya Sabha from Maharashtra in June 2024.

=== Deputy Chief Minister of Maharashtra ===
On 31 January 2026, following the death of her husband and sitting deputy chief minister, Ajit Pawar, Sunetra was elected as the leader of the Nationalist Congress Party. She was sworn in as the Deputy Chief Minister later that day, becoming the first woman to hold the office in the state's history. She was also given the charge of State Excise, Sports and Youth Welfare, Minorities Development and Aukaf ministries.
