= Atulbaba Suresh Bhosale =

Indian politician

Member of the Maharashtra Legislative Assembly
- Incumbent
- Assumed office 23 November 2024
- Preceded by: Prithviraj Chavan
- Constituency: Karad South

Personal details
- Party: Bharatiya Janata Party
- Spouse: Gauravi Deshmukh
- Profession: Politician

Atul Suresh Bhosale (born 28 March 1983) is an Indian politician from Maharashtra and a member of the Bharatiya Janata Party. He has served as a Member of the Maharashtra Legislative Assembly representing the Karad South Assembly constituency since 2024.

== Early life and education ==
Bhosale completed a Bachelor of Medicine and Bachelor of Surgery (MBBS) from Krishna Institute of Medical Sciences. He later obtained a Master of Business Administration (MBA) in Finance from the University of Liverpool.

== Political career ==
Bhosale has been associated with the Bharatiya Janata Party and has held organizational roles at the district level, including serving as district president of the party in Satara.

In the 2024 Maharashtra Legislative Assembly election, he was elected from the Karad South constituency, defeating Indian National Congress leader and former Chief Minister Prithviraj Chavan.

== Professional and cooperative roles ==
Bhosale has been associated with cooperative institutions in Maharashtra, particularly in the banking sector, including involvement with Krishna Sahakari Bank.

== Personal life ==
Bhosale is married to Gauravi Deshmukh the only daughter of former minister & MLC of Maharashtra Diliprao Deshmukh younger brother of Vilasrao Deshmukh. He is related by marriage to the family of former Maharashtra Chief Minister and Cabinet minister of India Vilasrao Deshmukh.

== See also ==
- Maharashtra Legislative Assembly
- Karad South Assembly constituency
