= Nationalist Congress Party =

Political party in India

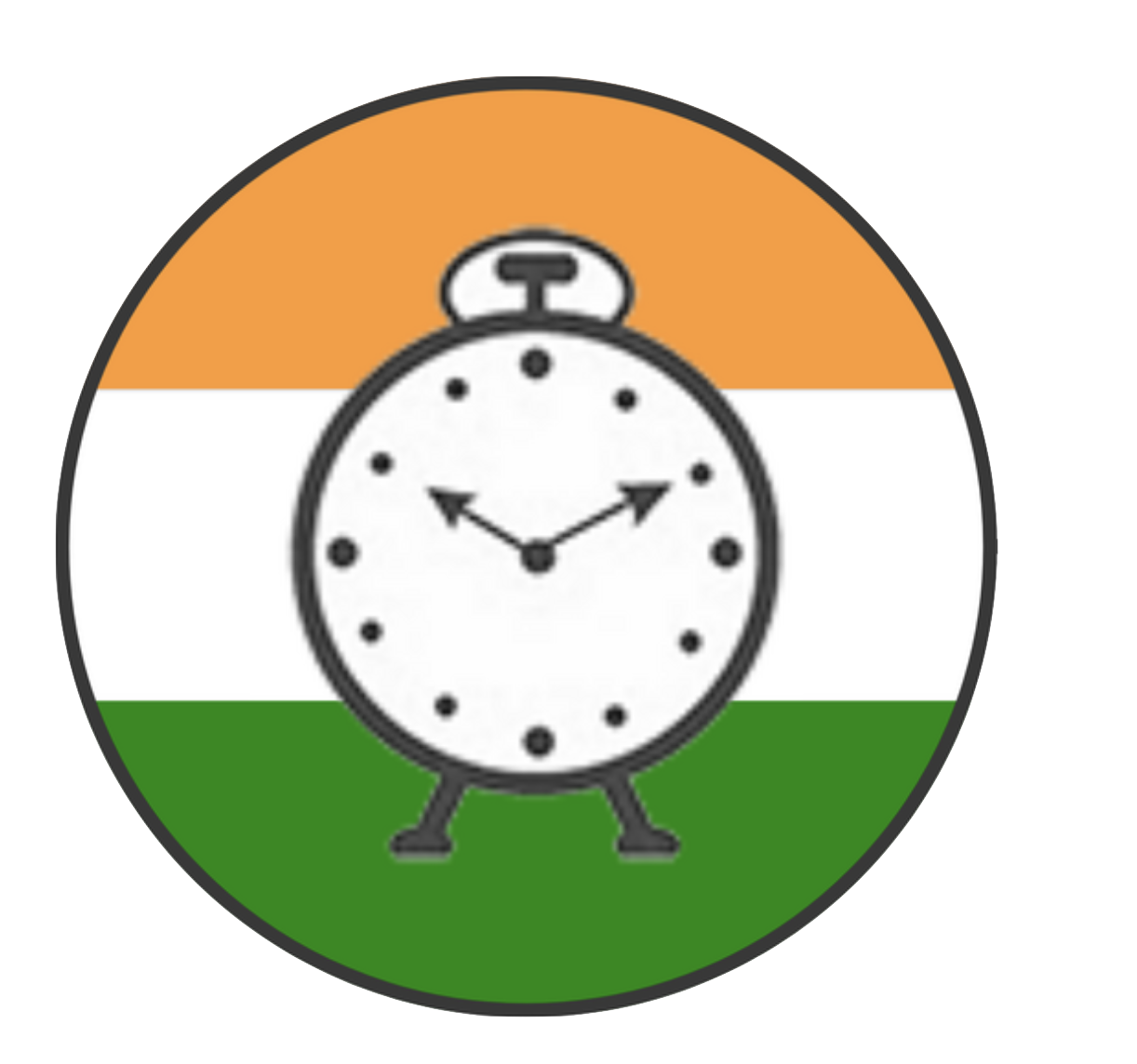
- Abbreviation: NCP
- President: Sunetra Pawar
- Spokesperson: Sana Malik
- Rajya Sabha Leader: Praful Patel
- Lok Sabha Leader: Sunil Tatkare
- Founder: Sharad Pawar; P. A. Sangma; Tariq Anwar
- Founded: 10 June 1999 (27 years ago)
- Split from: Indian National Congress
- Headquarters: 10, Bishmabhar Marg, New Delhi, India-110001
- Student wing: Prashant Kailas Kadam
- Youth wing: Dheeraj Sharma
- Women's wing: NCP Women Wing
- Ideology: Liberalism (Indian)
- Political position: Centre to centre-right
- Colours: Pink (post–2023); Pacific Blue (pre–2023)
- ECI status: State Party
- Alliance: National Alliance; NDA (2023–present); Regional Alliances; Maha Yuti (Maharashtra) (2023–present); Former Alliances: United Progressive Alliance (National) (2004–2023); Maha Vikas Aghadi (Maharashtra) (2019–2023); Maha Aghadi (Maharashtra) (1999–2019); United Democratic Front (Kerala) (2001–2023)
- Seats in Rajya Sabha: 4 / 245
- Seats in Lok Sabha: 1 / 543
- Seats in Maharashtra Legislative Council: 9 / 78
- Seats in State Legislative Assemblies: Indian states 41 / 288 (Maharashtra) 3 / 60 (Arunachal Pradesh)
- Number of states and union territories in government: 2 / 31

Election symbol
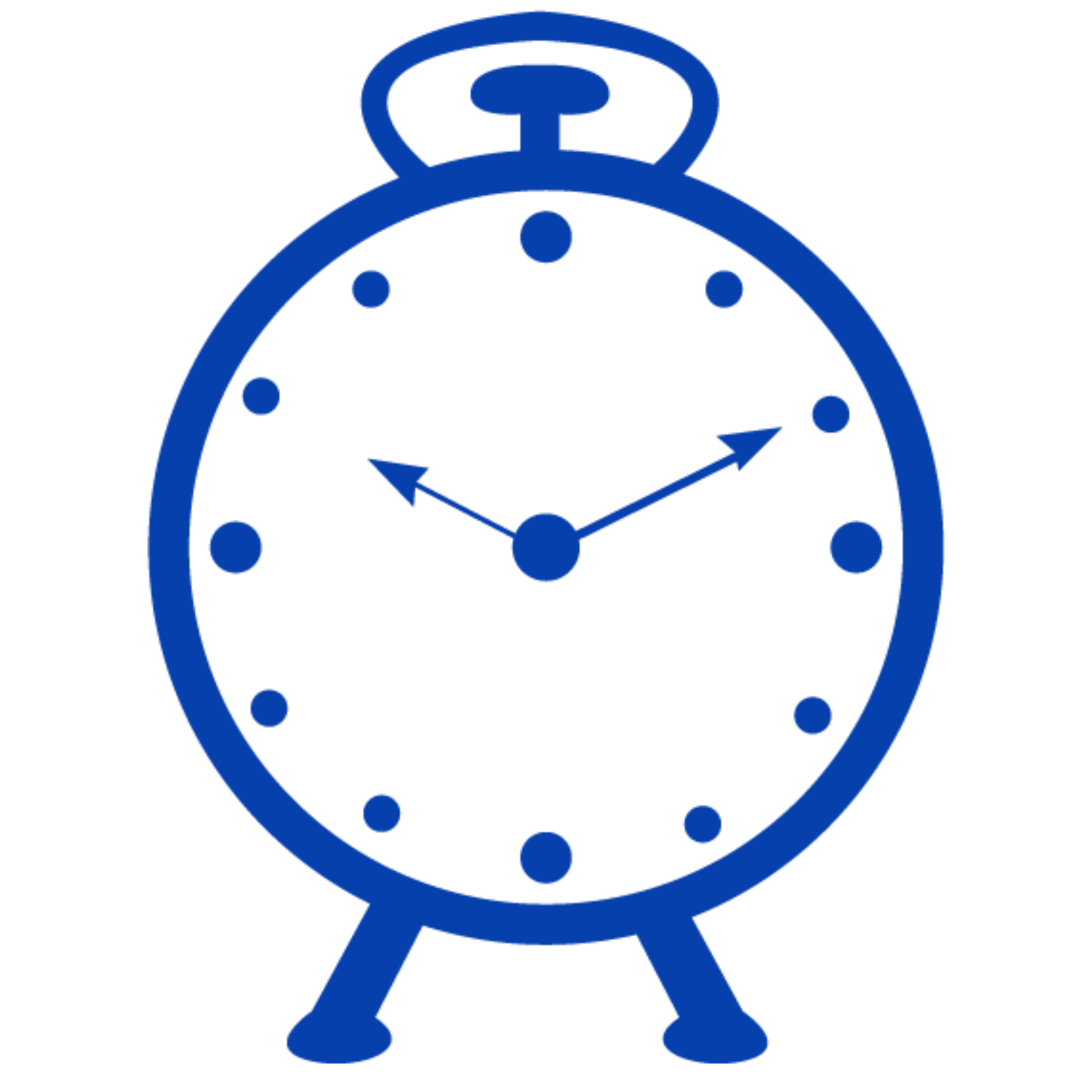

Party flag

Website
- ncponline.in

The Nationalist Congress Party (NCP) is a state-level political party in India and one of the major political parties in Maharashtra. The party has its presence in legislative assemblies of Maharashtra and Arunachal Pradesh, being in the governing coalition in both of these states. The party is also part of the current governing coalition National Democratic Alliance led by the Bharatiya Janata Party.

The original incarnation of the party was founded in 1999 by Sharad Pawar, P. A. Sangma, and Tariq Anwar after a split within the Indian National Congress. After major disagreements between its leaders, the party split again in 2023. Two factions emerged, one led by the founder president Sharad Pawar and the other led by his nephew Ajit Pawar. After a legal battle, the Supreme Court of India gave judgement in favour of the faction led by Ajit Pawar, which was allocated the party symbol and name. Subsequently, the Sharad Pawar led faction formed the NCP (SP). Under the leadership of Ajit Pawar, the NCP revamped itself and adopted the color pink to associate with the party.

The Nagaland state unit which was supporting the NDPP-BJP state government and the Jharkhand state unit of the party went with the Ajit Pawar-led NCP while the Kerala state unit of the party which was a part of the Left Democratic Front went with the Sharad Pawar-led NCP(SP).

== Party history and performance ==
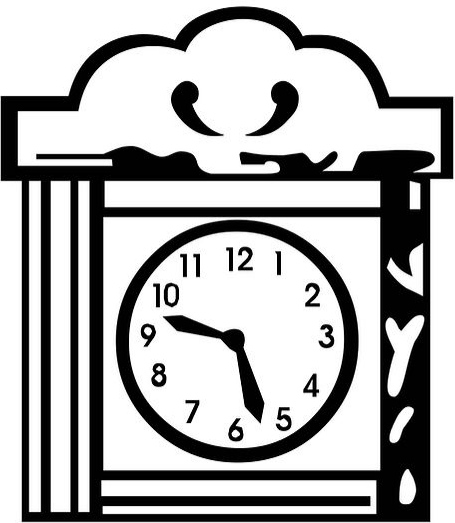
The old version of Clock Symbol allotted to NCP in 1999, later they modified the symbol.

=== First incarnation led by Sharad Pawar ===
==== Split from Congress ====
The NCP was formed on 10 June 1999, by Sharad Pawar, P. A. Sangma, and Tariq Anwar after they were expelled from the Indian National Congress on 20 May 1999, for disputing the right of Italian-born Sonia Gandhi to lead the party. When the NCP formed, the Indian Congress (Socialist) – Sarat Chandra Sinha party merged into the new party.

==== In government ====
Despite the NCP being founded on opposition to the leadership of Sonia Gandhi, the party joined the Congress-led United Progressive Alliance (UPA) to form the government of Maharashtra in October 1999. In 2004, the party joined the UPA to form the national government led by Manmohan Singh. The NCP's leader, Sharad Pawar served as the Minister of Agriculture for both five-year terms of the Singh-led government. The party remained part of the Congress-led Maharashtra state government until 2014. On 20 June 2012, P. A. Sangma left the NCP to contest the presidential election, which he lost.

==== In opposition ====
In the April and May 2014 Lok Sabha elections, the UPA lost to the rival National Democratic Alliance (NDA) led by Narendra Modi and the NCP was out of government for the first time in ten years. The NCP broke its alliance with the Congress Party just before the October 2014 Maharashtra Legislative Assembly elections to contest them on its own. In the assembly election the Bharatiya Janata Party (BJP) emerged as the largest party and formed a minority government, initially with support from the NCP.

In April 2019, voting took place for the 48 Lok Sabha seats from Maharashtra. The Congress and NCP had a seat-sharing arrangement. Similarly, despite their differences, the BJP and Shiv Sena once again contested the elections together under the NDA banner. The election was another landslide victory for the NDA, with the BJP and Shiv Sena winning 23 and 18 seats, respectively, out of the total of the state's 48 Lok Sabha seats. The Congress Party won only one seat in the state whereas the NCP won five seats from its stronghold of western Maharashtra.

==== Formation of Maharashtra Vikash Aghadi and subsequent split ====
During the October 2019 Maharashtra Legislative Assembly elections, the BJP–Shiv-Sena and NCP–Congress alliances remained intact for seat sharing. The BJP and Shiv Sena together gained the majority of seats in the assembly but could not form a government due to disagreements between the two parties. The BJP, with 105 seats, was far short of the 145 seats required to form a majority and declined to form a minority government. As a result, Shiv Sena started talks with the NCP and Congress to form a government. However, in a controversial move, on 23 November 2019, the BJP formed a government with support from the NCP, with Ajit Pawar as Deputy Chief Minister. This government collapsed three days later with Chief Minister Devendra Fadnavis and Pawar resigning their respective positions. Finally, the NCP came back into power at the state level as part of the Maha Vikas Aghadi coalition formed with Shiv Sena and the Congress. On 28 November 2019, the Governor of Maharashtra swore in Shiv Sena chief Uddhav Thackeray as the new Chief Minister of Maharashtra. Thackeray's cabinet included ministers from the NCP in key portfolios.

However, this alliance lost power in June 2022 after a rebel faction led by Shiv Sena leader Eknath Shinde gathered the support of a majority of Sena MLAs and reestablished the previous Sena-BJP coalition. Subsequently, on 20 July, NCP President Sharad Pawar dissolved almost all units of the party.

=== Second incarnation led by Ajit Pawar ===
In July 2023, Ajit Pawar, along with many of his supporters, left the Sharad Pawar-led NCP and joined the ruling Shiv Sena-BJP government as a Deputy Chief Minister of Maharashtra. This caused the NCP to split into two factions, with Ajit Pawar claiming in a letter to the Election Commission that he had been elected party president on June 30. In his first meeting after the split, he expressed a desire to retain the party's symbol and name, urged Sharad Pawar to retire and give opportunities to new people, and criticised many of Sharad's decisions, including the formation of a government with the Shiv Sena instead of the BJP in 2019. On 7 February 2024, The Election Commission Of India (ECI) awarded the party name and symbol to the faction headed by Ajit Pawar. The faction led by Sharad Pawar will be henceforth known as Nationalist Congress Party (Sharad Chandra Pawar).

== National President List ==
S. No.	Portrait	Name	Term start	Term end	Tenure
1		Sharad Pawar	10 June 1999	2 July 2023	24 years, 22 days
2		Ajit Pawar	30 June 2023	28 January 2026	2 years, 212 days
(Acting)		Praful Patel	28 January 2026	26 February 2026	29 days
3		Sunetra Pawar	26 February 2026	Incumbent	247 days

== 2024 Maharashtra polls ==
NCP contested under the Maha Yuti alliance and won 41 seats of the 50 it contested as part of the alliance. Maha Yuti won 235 out of 280 seats. Ajit Pawar became deputy chief minister under Devendra Fadnavis

== Party symbol, flag and color ==
The election symbol of NCP is an analogue alarm clock. The clock is drawn in blue and has two legs and an alarm button. It is situated on a tri-coloured Indian flag.

== Controversies and criticism ==
The Nationalist Congress Party has been extensively criticized for several reasons such as political corruption, insensitive comments, links to the underworld, and moral policing.

NCP leader Sharad Pawar was accused of having links to the underworld. This was revealed by former Supreme Court lawyer Ram Jethmalani, who had confirmed that after the March 1993 bombings in Bombay, Dawood Ibrahim had called him from London, saying that he was prepared to come to India and stand trial, on the condition that he should not be subjected to any third degree treatment from the police. When Jethmalani had conveyed this to Sharad Pawar, the political leaders in power did not agree to this proposal. As per Jethmalani, their refusal to allow Dawood's return was due to their fears that he would expose their secrets.

In May 2005, Nationalist Congress Party (NCP) workers stormed a pub in Pune, Maharashtra, broke window panes, damaged furniture, and thrashed visitors. The move came days after Pune Police had forced five pubs to shut before the closing time of 12:30 am.

On 29 November 2008, in the aftermath of the terrorist attack in Mumbai, NCP leader and Deputy Chief Minister R.R. Patil was forced to resign after making insensitive comments after the attack. He was quoted as saying, "They (the terrorists) came to kill 5,000 people but we ensured minimal damage". When asked at a press conference whether the terror strike was an intelligence failure Patil said, "It is not like that. In big cities like this, incidents like this do happen. It's is not a total failure."

On 7 April 2013, NCP leader Ajit Pawar's statement at a speech in Indapur sparked controversy due to its alleged callousness. In response to a 55-day fast by activists protesting the Maharashtra governments inability to provide water during a drought, he asked whether he should "urinate into [the dam]" to make up for the lack of water in it. After a public outcry against his statement, he publicly apologized, saying that the comment was the "biggest mistake of [his] life".

In 2021, Senior Inspector Sachin Vaze, an encounter specialist, was arrested for his involvement in the Antilia bomb scare. Through an investigation, Vaze revealed that he was acting at the behest of Anil Deshmukh, who was then minister of Home Affairs. Vaze and Deshmukh were also involved in collecting extortion money in December 2020 from members of the Indian Hotel and Restaurant Association (AHAR). Deshmukh was also under investigation by the Central Bureau of Investigation and Enforcement Directorate for money laundering, following accusations made by the former Mumbai Police commissioner Param Bir Singh.

On 23 February 2022, NCP President and leader Nawab Malik was arrested by the Enforcement Directorate in a money laundering case and his alleged links with underworld don Dawood Ibrahim. He was charged and placed under arrest under the provisions of Prevention of Money Laundering Act (PMLA) after several hours of grilling.

On 14 May 2022, Marathi television actress Ketaki Chitale was arrested by Mumbai Police for allegedly sharing an objectionable post about Nationalist Congress Party (NCP) chief Sharad Pawar. At the time of her arrest, NCP workers mobbed and attacked her and the officers who had arrested her. Chitale, who was molested, and her modesty was outraged by the NCP workers, and was later granted bail, was booked under IPC sections 500 (defamation), 501 (printing or engraving defamatory matter) and 153A (promoting enmity between different groups on grounds of religion, race, place of birth, residence, language, etc., and doing acts prejudicial to maintenance of harmony) of the Indian Penal Code.

== Electoral performance ==
=== General elections ===
Year	Lok Sabha	Seats contested	Seats won	+/-	Votes polled	% of votes	State (seats)
1999	13th Lok Sabha	32	8 / 543 (1%)	▲8	8,260,311	2.27%	Maharashtra (6); Manipur (1); Meghalaya (1)
2004	14th Lok Sabha	32	9 / 543 (2%)	▲1	7,023,175	1.80%	Maharashtra (9)
2009	15th Lok Sabha	68	9 / 543 (2%)	Steady	8,521,502	1.19%	Maharashtra (8); Meghalaya (1)
2014	16th Lok Sabha	36	6 / 543 (1%)	▼3	8,635,558	1.56%	Maharashtra (4); Bihar (1); Lakshadweep(1)
2019	17th Lok Sabha	35	5 / 543 (0.9%)	▼1	8,483,632	1.39%	Maharashtra (4); Lakshadweep(1)
2024	18th Lok Sabha	4	1 / 543 (0.2%)	party split	2059179	0.34	Maharashtra (1)

=== State Legislative Assembly elections ===
Year	Vidhan Sabha term	Seats contested	Votes polled	+/-	Seats won	% of votes
Goa Legislative Assembly
2017		10	20,916	▲1	1 / 40 (3%)	2.28%
2022		13	10,846	▼1	0 / 40 (0%)	▼1.1%
Gujarat Legislative Assembly
2017		182	1,84,815	▼1	1 / 182 (0.5%)	0.62%
2022		2	76,949	▼1	0 / 182 (0%)	▼0.36%
Jharkhand Legislative Assembly
2019		7	63,320	▲1	1 / 81 (1%)	0.42%
2024		24	17,846	▼1	0 / 81 (0%)	0.10%
Kerala Legislative Assembly
2016		4	2,37,408	Steady	2 / 140 (1%)	1.17%
2021		3	2,06,130	Steady	2 / 140 (1%)	0.99%
Maharashtra Legislative Assembly
1999	10th Vidhan Sabha	223	74,25,427	▲58	58 / 288 (20%)	22.60%
2004	11th Vidhan Sabha	124	78,41,962	▲13	71 / 288 (25%)	18.75%
2009	12th Vidhan Sabha	113	74,20,212	▼9	62 / 288 (22%)	16.37%
2014	13th Vidhan Sabha	278	91,22,285	▼21	41 / 288 (14%)	17.24%
2019	14th Vidhan Sabha	125	92,16,919	▲13	54 / 288 (19%)	16.71%
2024	15th Vidhan Sabha	64	58,16,566	party split	41 / 288 (14%)	9.01%
Meghalaya Legislative Assembly
2018		6	29,287	▼1	1 / 60 (2%)	1.83%
Arunachal Pradesh Legislative Assembly
2024		15	63,630	▲3	3 / 60 (5%)	10.43%

== List of Members of Lok Sabha ==
Election Year	Portrait	MP	Constituency	State
18th Lok Sabha
2024		Sunil Tatkare	Raigad	Maharashtra
17th Lok Sabha
2019		Mohammed Faizal Padippura	Lakshadweep	Lakshadweep
2019		Supriya Sule	Baramati	Maharashtra
2019		Sunil Tatkare	Raigad	Maharashtra
2019		Amol Kolhe	Shirur	Maharashtra
2019		Udayanraje Bhosale	Satara	Maharashtra
2019; By-election		Shriniwas Patil	Satara	Maharashtra
16th Lok Sabha
2014		Tariq Anwar	Katihar	Bihar
2014		Mohammed Faizal Padippura	Lakshadweep	Lakshadweep
2014		Supriya Sule	Baramati	Maharashtra
2014		Dhananjay Mahadik	Kolhapur	Maharashtra
2014		Udayanraje Bhosale	Satara	Maharashtra
2014		Vijaysinh Mohite–Patil	Madha	Maharashtra
2018; By-Election		Madhukar Kukde	Bhandara–Gondiya	Maharashtra
15th Lok Sabha
2009		Praful Patel	Bhandara–Gondiya	Maharashtra
2009		Sameer Bhujbal	Nashik	Maharashtra
2009		Sanjeev Naik	Thane	Maharashtra
2009		Sanjay Dina Patil	Mumbai North East	Maharashtra
2009		Supriya Sule	Baramati	Maharashtra
2009		Padamsinh Bajirao Patil	Osmanabad	Maharashtra
2009		Sharad Pawar	Madha	Maharashtra
2009		Udayanraje Bhosale	Satara	Maharashtra
2009		Agatha K Sangma	Tura (ST)	Meghalaya
14th Lok Sabha
2004		Devidas Anandrao Pingale	Nashik	Maharashtra
2004		Adv. Vasantrao J More (Elected on 12.4.2007)	Erandol	Maharashtra
2004		Suryakanta Patil	Hingoli	Maharashtra
2004		Jaisingrao Gaikwad Patil	Beed	Maharashtra
2004		Tukaram Gangadhar Gadakh	Ahmednagar	Maharashtra
2004		Sharad Pawar	Baramati	Maharashtra
2004		Laxmanrao Pandurang Jadhav (Patil)	Satara	Maharashtra
2004		Shriniwas Dadasaheb Patil	Karad	Maharashtra
2004		Nivedita Sambhajirao Mane	Ichalkaranji	Maharashtra
2004		Sadashivrao Dadoba Mandlik	Kolhapur	Maharashtra
Elected on 19.02.2006; Resigned in March 2008		P. A. Sangma	Tura	Meghalaya
Elected in May 2008		Agatha Sangma	Tura	Meghalaya
13th Lok Sabha
1999		Ashok Namdeorao Mohol	Khed	Maharashtra
1999		Sharadchandra Govindrao Pawar	Baramati	Maharashtra
1999		Laxmanrao Pandurang Jadhav (Patil)	Satara	Maharashtra
1999		Shriniwas Dadasaheb Patil	Karad	Maharashtra
1999		Nivedita Sambhajirao Mane	Ichalkaranji	Maharashtra
1999		Sadashivrao Dadoba Mandlik	Kolhapur	Maharashtra
1999		Holkhomang Haokip	Outer Manipur (ST)	Manipur
1999		Purano Agitok Sangma	Tura	Meghalaya

== List of Rajya Sabha Members ==
- * represents current members

No.	Name	State	Date of Appointment	Date of Retirement
1	Rajendra Jain	Maharashtra	18-Jun-2026	04-Jul-2028
2	Parth Pawar	Maharashtra	03-Apr-2026	02-Apr-2032
3	Nitin Patil	Maharashtra	28-Aug-2024	04-Jul-2028
4	Sunetra Pawar	Maharashtra	21-Jun-2024	06-May-2026
5	Praful Patel	Maharashtra	03-Apr-2024	02-Apr-2030
5	Praful Patel	Maharashtra	05-Jul-2022	27-Feb-2024
5	Praful Patel	Maharashtra	05-Jul-2016	04-Jul-2022
5	Praful Patel	Maharashtra	13-Jun-2014	04-Jul-2016
5	Praful Patel	Maharashtra	03-Apr-2006	16-May-2009
5	Praful Patel	Maharashtra	03-Apr-2000	02-Apr-2006
6	Sharad Pawar	Maharashtra	03-Apr-2020	02-Apr-2026
6	Sharad Pawar	Maharashtra	03-Apr-2014	02-Apr-2020
7	Fouzia Khan	Maharashtra	03-Apr-2020	02-Apr-2026
8	Vandana Chavan	Maharashtra	03-Apr-2018	02-Apr-2024
8	Vandana Chavan	Maharashtra	03-Apr-2012	02-Apr-2018
9	Majeed Memon	Maharashtra	03-Apr-2014	02-Apr-2020
10	D. P. Tripathi	Maharashtra	03-Apr-2012	02-Apr-2018
11	Ishwarlal Jain	Maharashtra	05-Jul-2010	04-Jul-2016
12	Tariq Anwar	Maharashtra	05-Jul-2010	16-May-2014
12	Tariq Anwar	Maharashtra	05-Jul-2004	04-Jul-2010
13	Govindrao Adik	Maharashtra	04-Aug-2009	02-Apr-2012
14	Ranjitsinh Mohite-Patil	Maharashtra	04-Aug-2009	02-Apr-2012
15	Thomas A. Sangma	Meghalaya	13-Apr-2008	04-Feb-2013
16	Y. P. Trivedi	Maharashtra	03-Apr-2008	02-Apr-2014
17	Janardan Waghmare	Maharashtra	03-Apr-2008	02-Apr-2014
18	Supriya Sule	Maharashtra	18-Sep-2006	16-May-2009
19	Vasant Chavan	Maharashtra	03-Apr-2006	11-Jul-2006
19	Vasant Chavan	Maharashtra	25-Apr-2005	02-Apr-2006
20	Robert Kharshiing	Meghalaya	13-Apr-2002	12-Apr-2008
21	Datta Meghe	Maharashtra	03-Apr-2002	02-Apr-2008
22	Mukesh Patel	Maharashtra	03-Apr-2002	02-Apr-2008

== List of State Ministers ==
=== List of Deputy Chief Ministers ===
List of Deputy Chief Ministers of Maharashtra
Nos.	Portrait	Chief Minister	Term starts	Term ends	Duration		Ministry
1.	Chhagan Bhujbal	Vilasrao Deshmukh	18-October-1999	23-December-2003	4 years 66 days	6 years 39 days	First Deshmukh ministry
1.	Chhagan Bhujbal	Sushilkumar Shinde	18-October-1999	23-December-2003	4 years 66 days	6 years 39 days	Sushilkumar Shinde ministry
1.	Chhagan Bhujbal	Ashok Chavan	8-December-2008	7-November-2009	1 year 338 days	6 years 39 days	First Ashok Chavan ministry
1.	Chhagan Bhujbal	Ashok Chavan	7-November-2009	11-November-2010	1 year 338 days	6 years 39 days	Second Ashok Chavan ministry
2.	Vijaysinh Mohite–Patil	Sushilkumar Shinde	25-December-2003	1-November-2004	312 days		Sushilkumar Shinde ministry
3.	R. R. Patil	Vilasrao Deshmukh	1-November-2004	9-December-2008	4 years 37 days		Second Deshmukh ministry
4.	Ajit Pawar	Prithviraj Chavan	11-November-2010	25-September- 2012	1 year 319 days	8 years 202 days	Prithviraj Chavan ministry
4.	Ajit Pawar	Prithviraj Chavan	7-December-2012	28-September-2014	1 year 219 days	8 years 202 days	Prithviraj Chavan ministry
4.	Ajit Pawar	Devendra Fadnavis	23-November-2019	26-November-2019	3 days	8 years 202 days	Second Fadnavis ministry
4.	Ajit Pawar	Uddhav Thackeray	30-December-2019	29-June-2022	2 years 181 days	8 years 202 days	Thackeray ministry
4.	Ajit Pawar	Eknath Shinde	2-July-2023	5-December-2024	1 year 156 days	8 years 202 days	Eknath Shinde ministry
4.	Ajit Pawar	Devendra Fadnavis	5-December-2024	28-January-2026 (died in office)	1 year, 54 days	8 years 202 days	Third Fadnavis ministry
5.	Sunetra Pawar	Devendra Fadnavis	31-January-2026		273 days		Third Fadnavis ministry

=== List of Ministers under Vilasrao Deshmukh ===
List of NCP Ministers in First Deshmukh ministry(18-Oct-1999-16-January-2003)
Nos.	Ministers	CM
Deputy Chief Minister		Vilasrao Deshmukh
1.	Chhagan Bhujbal	Vilasrao Deshmukh
Cabinet Minister		Vilasrao Deshmukh
2.	Padamsinh Bajirao Patil	Vilasrao Deshmukh
3.	Vijaysinh Mohite–Patil	Vilasrao Deshmukh
4.	Madhukar Pichad	Vilasrao Deshmukh
5.	Ajit Pawar	Vilasrao Deshmukh
6.	Vikramsinh Patankar	Vilasrao Deshmukh
7.	Datta Meghe	Vilasrao Deshmukh
8.	Vasant Chavan	Vilasrao Deshmukh
9.	Digvijay Khanvilkar	Vilasrao Deshmukh
10.	R. R. Patil	Vilasrao Deshmukh
11.	Dilip Walse Patil	Vilasrao Deshmukh
12.	Jayant Patil	Vilasrao Deshmukh
Minister of State(MoS)		Vilasrao Deshmukh
13.	Arjun Tulshiram Pawar	Vilasrao Deshmukh
14.	Laxam Dhoble	Vilasrao Deshmukh
15.	Babasaheb Kupekar	Vilasrao Deshmukh
16.	Anil Deshmukh	Vilasrao Deshmukh
17.	Jaydattaji Kshirsagar	Vilasrao Deshmukh
18.	Hemant Deshmukh	Vilasrao Deshmukh
19.	Vimal Mundada	Vilasrao Deshmukh
20.	Ramraje Naik Nimbalkar	Vilasrao Deshmukh
21.	Sunil Tatkare	Vilasrao Deshmukh
22.	Subhash Thakre	Vilasrao Deshmukh
23.	N. P. Hirani	Vilasrao Deshmukh

=== List of Ministers under Sushilkumar Shinde ===
List of NCP Ministers in Sushilkumar Shinde ministry(18-January-2003-1-November-2004)
Nos.	Ministers	CM
Deputy Chief Minister		Sushilkumar Shinde
1.	Chhagan Bhujbal	Sushilkumar Shinde
2.	Vijaysinh Mohite–Patil	Sushilkumar Shinde
Cabinet Minister		Sushilkumar Shinde
3.	Padamsinh Bajirao Patil	Sushilkumar Shinde
4.	Ajit Pawar	Sushilkumar Shinde
5.	Vikramsinh Patankar	Sushilkumar Shinde
6.	Vasant Chavan	Sushilkumar Shinde
7.	R. R. Patil	Sushilkumar Shinde
8.	Jayant Patil	Sushilkumar Shinde

=== List of Ministers under Vilasrao Deshmukh ===
List of NCP Ministers in Second Deshmukh ministry(1-November-2004-10-December-2008)
Nos.	Ministers	CM
Deputy Chief Minister		Vilasrao Deshmukh
1.	R. R. Patil	Vilasrao Deshmukh
Cabinet Minister		Vilasrao Deshmukh
2.	Chhagan Bhujbal	Vilasrao Deshmukh
3.	Vijaysinh Mohite–Patil	Vilasrao Deshmukh
4.	Ajit Pawar	Vilasrao Deshmukh
5.	Dilip Walse Patil	Vilasrao Deshmukh
6.	Jayant Patil	Vilasrao Deshmukh
7.	Ganesh Naik	Vilasrao Deshmukh
8.	Suresh Jain	Vilasrao Deshmukh
9.	Nawab Malik	Vilasrao Deshmukh
10.	Manohar Naik	Vilasrao Deshmukh
11.	Vijaykumar Krishnarao Gavit	Vilasrao Deshmukh
12.	Babanrao Pachpute	Vilasrao Deshmukh
13.	Anil Deshmukh	Vilasrao Deshmukh
14.	Vimal Mundada	Vilasrao Deshmukh
15.	Ramraje Naik Nimbalkar	Vilasrao Deshmukh
16.	Sunil Tatkare	Vilasrao Deshmukh

=== List of Ministers under Ashok Chavan ===
List of NCP Ministers in First Ashok Chavan ministry(1-November-2009-10-December-2008)
Nos.	Ministers	CM
Deputy Chief Minister		Ashok Chavan
1.	Chhagan Bhujbal	Ashok Chavan
Cabinet Minister		Ashok Chavan
2.	Ajit Pawar	Ashok Chavan
3.	R. R. Patil	Ashok Chavan
4.	Dilip Walse Patil	Ashok Chavan
5.	Jayant Patil	Ashok Chavan
6.	Ganesh Naik	Ashok Chavan
7.	Ramesh Bang	Ashok Chavan
8.	Nawab Malik	Ashok Chavan
9.	Manohar Naik	Ashok Chavan
10.	Vijaykumar Krishnarao Gavit	Ashok Chavan
11.	Babanrao Pachpute	Ashok Chavan
12.	Vimal Mundada	Ashok Chavan
13.	Ramraje Naik Nimbalkar	Ashok Chavan
14.	Sunil Tatkare	Ashok Chavan
15.	Rajendra Shingne	
16.	Rajesh Tope	

List of NCP Ministers in Second Ashok Chavan ministry(1-November-2004-10-December-2008)
Nos.	Ministers	CM
Deputy Chief Minister		Ashok Chavan
1.	Chhagan Bhujbal	Ashok Chavan
Cabinet Minister		Ashok Chavan
2.	R. R. Patil	Ashok Chavan
3.	Jayant Patil	Ashok Chavan
4.	Ganesh Naik	Ashok Chavan
5.	Ajit Pawar	Ashok Chavan
6.	Anil Deshmukh	Ashok Chavan
7.	Sunil Tatkare	Ashok Chavan
8.	Laxmanrao Dhobale	Ashok Chavan
9.	Jaydattaji Kshirsagar	Ashok Chavan
10.	Manohar Naik	Ashok Chavan
11.	Vijaykumar Krishnarao Gavit	Ashok Chavan
12.	Ramraje Naik Nimbalkar	Ashok Chavan
13.	Babanrao Pachpute	Ashok Chavan
14.	Rajesh Tope	Ashok Chavan
Minister of State(MoS)		
15.	Bhaskar Jadhav	
16.	Prakashdada Solanke	
17.	Sachin Ahir	
18.	Fouzia Khan	
19.	Gulabrao Baburao Deokar	

=== List of Ministers under Prithviraj Chavan ===
List of NCP Ministers in Prithviraj Chavan ministry(11-November-2010-16-September-2014)
Nos.	Ministers	CM
Deputy Chief Minister		Prithviraj Chavan
1.	Ajit Pawar	Prithviraj Chavan
Cabinet Minister		Prithviraj Chavan
2.	Chhagan Bhujbal	Prithviraj Chavan
3.	R. R. Patil	Prithviraj Chavan
4.	Sunil Tatkare	Prithviraj Chavan
5.	Jayant Patil	Prithviraj Chavan
6.	Hasan Mushrif	Prithviraj Chavan
7.	Jaydattaji Kshirsagar	Prithviraj Chavan
8.	Jitendra Awhad	Prithviraj Chavan
9.	Vijaykumar Krishnarao Gavit	Prithviraj Chavan
10.	Anil Deshmukh	Prithviraj Chavan
11.	Rajesh Tope	Prithviraj Chavan
12.	Shashikant Shinde	Prithviraj Chavan
13.	Babanrao Pachpute	Prithviraj Chavan
14.	Ramraje Naik Nimbalkar	Prithviraj Chavan
15.	Madhukar Pichad	Prithviraj Chavan
16.	Laxman Dhobale	
Minister of State(MoS)		
17.	Uday Samant	
18.	Bhaskar Jadhav	
19.	Prakashdada Solanke	
20.	Sachin Ahir	
21.	Fouzia Khan	
22.	Gulabrao Deokar	

=== List of Ministers under Devendra Fadnavis ===
List of NCP Ministers in Second Fadnavis ministry(23-November-2019-28-November-2019)
Nos.	Ministers	CM
Deputy Chief Minister		Devendra Fadnavis
1.	Ajit Pawar	Devendra Fadnavis

=== List of Ministers under Uddhav Thackeray ===
List of NCP Ministers in Uddhav Thackeray ministry(28-November-2019-29-June-2022)
Nos.	Ministers	CM
Deputy Chief Minister		Uddhav Thackeray
1.	Ajit Pawar	Uddhav Thackeray
Cabinet Minister		Uddhav Thackeray
2.	Chhagan Bhujbal	Uddhav Thackeray
3.	Dilip Walse Patil	Uddhav Thackeray
4.	Dhananjay Munde	Uddhav Thackeray
5.	Jayant Patil	Uddhav Thackeray
8.	Jitendra Awhad	Uddhav Thackeray
9.	Nawab Malik	Uddhav Thackeray
10.	Anil Deshmukh	Uddhav Thackeray
11.	Rajesh Tope	Uddhav Thackeray
12.	Rajendra Shingne	Uddhav Thackeray
13.	Shamrao Pandurang Patil	Uddhav Thackeray
14.	Hasan Mushrif	Uddhav Thackeray
Minister of State(MoS)		Uddhav Thackeray
15.	Prajakt Tanpure	Uddhav Thackeray
16.	Dattatray Vithoba Bharne	Uddhav Thackeray
17.	Sanjay Bansode	Uddhav Thackeray
18.	Aditi Tatkare	Uddhav Thackeray

=== List of Ministers under Eknath Shinde ===
List of NCP Ministers in Eknath Shinde ministry(3-July-2023-5-December-2024)
Nos.	Ministers	CM
Deputy Chief Minister		Eknath Shinde
1.	Ajit Pawar	Eknath Shinde
Cabinet Minister		Eknath Shinde
2.	Chhagan Bhujbal	Eknath Shinde
3.	Dilip Walse Patil	Eknath Shinde
4.	Dhananjay Munde	Eknath Shinde
5.	Aditi Tatkare	Eknath Shinde
6.	Sanjay Bansode	Eknath Shinde
7.	Dharamrao Baba Atram	Eknath Shinde
8.	Anil Bhaidas Patil	Eknath Shinde
9.	Hasan Mushrif	Eknath Shinde

=== Ministers under Devendra Fadnavis ===
List of NCP Ministers in Third Fadnavis ministry(5-December-2024-till date)
Nos.	Ministers	CM
Deputy Chief Minister		Devendra Fadnavis
1.	Ajit Pawar	Devendra Fadnavis
2.	Sunetra Pawar	Devendra Fadnavis
Cabinet Minister		Devendra Fadnavis
3.	Hasan Mushrif	Devendra Fadnavis
4.	Chaggan Bhujbal	Devendra Fadnavis
5.	Aditi Tatkare	Devendra Fadnavis
6.	Babasaheb Patil	Devendra Fadnavis
7.	Makrand Jadhav - Patil	Devendra Fadnavis
8.	Narhari Zirwal	Devendra Fadnavis
9.	Manikrao Kokate	Devendra Fadnavis
10.	Dattatray Vithoba Bharne	Devendra Fadnavis
Minister of State(MoS)		Devendra Fadnavis
11.	Indranil Naik	Devendra Fadnavis

== See also ==
- Politics of India
- List of political parties in India
- Nationalist Congress Party – SP
- Maha Aghadi
- Politics of Maharashtra
- Indian National Developmental Inclusive Alliance

== Notes ==
1.Praful Patel, Sunetra Pawar and Nitin Patil from Rajya Sabha and Sunil Tatkare from Lok Sabha.
