= List of Rajya Sabha members from Maharashtra =

The Rajya Sabha (meaning the "Council of States") is the upper house of the Parliament of India. Maharashtra elects 19 seats and they are indirectly elected by the state legislators of Maharashtra. Earlier since 1952, Bombay State elects 17 seats, Madhya Pradesh State elects 12 seats, Hyderabad State 11 seats and Mysore State elect 6 seats. After Constitution (Seventh Amendment) Act of 1956, Bombay State elects 27 seats. After Bombay Reorganisation Act of 1960, three seats were increased and effective from 1 May 1960, while new Maharashtra State elects 19 seats, the new Gujarat State elects 11 seats. The number of seats allocated to the party, are determined by the number of seats a party possesses during nomination and the party nominates a member to be voted on. Elections within the state legislatures are held using Single transferable vote with proportional representation.

== Current members ==
Keys:
NDA - 14 BJP (7) NCP (4) SHS (2) RPI(A) (1)
MVA - 04 INC (2) NCP-SP (1) SS(UBT) (1)

#	Name	Party	Term start	Term end
1		BJP		02-Apr-2032
2	Vinod Tawde	BJP	03-Apr-2026	02-Apr-2032
3	Maya Ivnate	BJP	03-Apr-2026	02-Apr-2032
4	Medha Kulkarni	BJP	03-Apr-2024	02-Apr-2030
5	Ashok Chavan	BJP	03-Apr-2024	02-Apr-2030
6	Ajit Gopchade	BJP	03-Apr-2024	02-Apr-2030
7	Dhananjay Mahadik	BJP	05-Jul-2022	04-Jul-2028
8	Anil Bonde	BJP	05-Jul-2022	04-Jul-2028
9	Parth Pawar	NCP	03-Apr-2026	02-Apr-2032
10	Praful Patel	NCP	03-Apr-2024	02-Apr-2030
11	Nitin Jadhav - Patil	NCP	28-Aug-2024	04-Jul-2028
12	Rajendra Jain	NCP	18-Jun-2026	04-Jul-2028
13	Jyoti Waghmare	SHS	03-Apr-2026	02-Apr-2032
14	Milind Deora	SHS	03-Apr-2024	02-Apr-2030
15	Ramdas Athawale	RPI(A)	03-Apr-2026	02-Apr-2032
16	Chandrakant Handore	INC	03-Apr-2024	02-Apr-2030
17	Imran Pratapgarhi	INC	05-Jul-2022	04-Jul-2028
18	Sanjay Raut	SS(UBT)	05-Jul-2022	04-Jul-2028
19	Sharad Pawar	NCP-SP	03-Apr-2026	02-Apr-2032

== Chronological list of all Rajya Sabha members from Maharashtra state ==
Chronological list by last date of appointment

- * represents current members

Name	Party	Term start	Term end	Term	Notes
Rajendra Jain	NCP	18-Jun-2026	04-Jul-2028	1	By-election due to the resignation of Sunetra Pawar
Vinod Tawde	BJP	03-Apr-2026	02-Apr-2032	1	
Maya Ivnate	BJP	03-Apr-2026	02-Apr-2032	1	
Ramrao Wadkute	BJP	03-Apr-2026	22-Nov-2026	1	Died in office
Jyoti Waghmare	SHS	03-Apr-2026	02-Apr-2032	1	
Parth Pawar	NCP	03-Apr-2026	02-Apr-2032	1	
Ramdas Athawale	RPI(A)	03-Apr-2026	02-Apr-2032	3	
Sharad Pawar	NCP-SP	03-Apr-2026	02-Apr-2032	3	
Dhairyashil Patil	BJP	28-Aug-2024	02-Apr-2026	1	By-election due to the resignation of Udayanraje Bhosale
Nitin Patil	NCP	28-Aug-2024	04-Jul-2028	1	By-election due to the resignation of Piyush Goyal
Sunetra Pawar	NCP	21-Jun-2024	06-May-2026	1	1. By-election due to the resignation of Praful Patel; 2. Resigned from the Rajya Sabha after winning the Baramati by-election in 2026
Medha Kulkarni	BJP	03-Apr-2024	02-Apr-2030	1	
Ashok Chavan	BJP	03-Apr-2024	02-Apr-2030	1	
Ajit Gopchade	BJP	03-Apr-2024	02-Apr-2030	1	
Milind Deora	SHS	03-Apr-2024	02-Apr-2030	1	
Praful Patel	NCP	03-Apr-2024	02-Apr-2030	6	
Chandrakant Handore	INC	03-Apr-2024	02-Apr-2030	1	
Piyush Goyal	BJP	05-Jul-2022	04-Jun-2024	3	Elected as Member of Parliament from Mumbai North in 2024
Dhananjay Mahadik	BJP	05-Jul-2022	04-Jul-2028	1	
Anil Bonde	BJP	05-Jul-2022	04-Jul-2028	1	
Sanjay Raut	SHS	05-Jul-2022	04-Jul-2028	4	
Praful Patel	NCP	05-Jul-2022	27-Feb-2024	5	Resigned
Imran Pratapgarhi	INC	05-Jul-2022	04-Jul-2028	1	
Rajani Patil	INC	27-Sep-2021	02-Apr-2026	2	By-election due to the death of Rajeev Satav
Udayanraje Bhosale	BJP	03-Apr-2020	04-Jun-2024	1	Elected as Member of Parliament from Satara in 2024
Bhagwat Karad	BJP	03-Apr-2020	02-Apr-2026	1	
Ramdas Athawale	RPI(A)	03-Apr-2020	02-Apr-2026	2	
Sharad Pawar	NCP	03-Apr-2020	02-Apr-2026	2	
Fouzia Khan	NCP	03-Apr-2020	02-Apr-2026	1	
Priyanka Chaturvedi	SHS	03-Apr-2020	02-Apr-2026	1	
Rajeev Satav	INC	03-Apr-2020	16-May-2021	1	Died
Prakash Javadekar	BJP	03-Apr-2018	02-Apr-2024	2	
Narayan Rane	BJP	03-Apr-2018	02-Apr-2024	1	
V. Muraleedharan	BJP	03-Apr-2018	02-Apr-2024	1	
Anil Desai	SHS	03-Apr-2018	02-Apr-2024	2	
Vandana Chavan	NCP	03-Apr-2018	02-Apr-2024	2	
Kumar Ketkar	INC	03-Apr-2018	02-Apr-2024	1	
Piyush Goyal	BJP	05-Jul-2016	04-Jul-2022	2	
Vinay Sahasrabuddhe	BJP	05-Jul-2016	04-Jul-2022	1	
Vikas Mahatme	BJP	05-Jul-2016	04-Jul-2022	1	
Sanjay Raut	SHS	05-Jul-2016	04-Jul-2022	3	
Praful Patel	NCP	05-Jul-2016	04-Jul-2022	4	
P. Chidambaram	INC	05-Jul-2016	04-Jul-2022	1	
Amar Shankar Sable	BJP	14-Mar-2015	02-Apr-2020	1	By-election due to the death of Murli Deora
Praful Patel	NCP	13-Jun-2014	04-Jul-2016	3	By-election due to the resignation of Tariq Anwar
Murli Deora	INC	03-Apr-2014	24-Nov-2014	3	Died
Husain Dalwai	INC	03-Apr-2014	02-Apr-2020	2	
Sharad Pawar	NCP	03-Apr-2014	02-Apr-2020	1	
Majeed Memon	NCP	03-Apr-2014	02-Apr-2020	1	
Rajkumar Dhoot	SHS	03-Apr-2014	02-Apr-2020	3	
Ramdas Athawale	RPI(A)	03-Apr-2014	02-Apr-2020	1	
Sanjay Kakade	Ind	03-Apr-2014	02-Apr-2020	1	
Rajani Patil	INC	10-Jan-2013	02-Apr-2018	1	By-election due to the death of Vilasrao Deshmukh
Rajeev Shukla	INC	03-Apr-2012	02-Apr-2018	2	
Vilasrao Deshmukh	INC	03-Apr-2012	14-Aug-2012	2	Died
D. P. Tripathi	NCP	03-Apr-2012	02-Apr-2018	1	
Vandana Chavan	NCP	03-Apr-2012	02-Apr-2018	1	
Ajay Sancheti	BJP	03-Apr-2012	02-Apr-2018	1	
Anil Desai	SHS	03-Apr-2012	02-Apr-2018	1	
Husain Dalwai	INC	26-Jul-2011	02-Apr-2014	1	By-election due to the resignation of Prithviraj Chavan
Avinash Pande	INC	05-Jul-2010	04-Jul-2016	1	
Vijay J. Darda	INC	05-Jul-2010	04-Jul-2016	3	
Ishwarlal Jain	NCP	05-Jul-2010	04-Jul-2016		
Tariq Anwar	NCP	05-Jul-2010	16-May-2014		Elected as Member of Parliament from Katihar Lok Sabha constituency in 2014
Piyush Goyal	BJP	05-Jul-2010	04-Jul-2016	1	
Sanjay Raut	SHS	05-Jul-2010	04-Jul-2016	2	
Vilasrao Deshmukh	INC	04-Aug-2009	02-Apr-2012	1	By-election due to the resignation of Sushilkumar Shinde
Govindrao Adik	NCP	04-Aug-2009	02-Apr-2012	3	By-election due to the resignation of Praful Patel
Ranjitsinh Mohite-Patil	NCP	04-Aug-2009	02-Apr-2012	1	By-election due to the resignation of Supriya Sule
Prithviraj Chavan	INC	03-Apr-2008	07-May-2011	2	Resigned from the Rajya Sabha after winning the MLC by-election in April-May 2011
Murli Deora	INC	03-Apr-2008	02-Apr-2014	2	
Y. P. Trivedi	NCP	03-Apr-2008	02-Apr-2014		
Janardan Waghmare	NCP	03-Apr-2008	02-Apr-2014	1	
Rajkumar Dhoot	SHS	03-Apr-2008	02-Apr-2014	2	
Bharatkumar Raut	SHS	03-Apr-2008	02-Apr-2014	1	
Prakash Javadekar	BJP	03-Apr-2008	02-Apr-2014	1	
Supriya Sule	NCP	18-Sep-2006	16-May-2009	1	By-election due to the death of Vasant Chavan; Elected to Baramati Lok Sabha in 2009
Rahul Bajaj	Ind	20-Jun-2006	04-Jul-2010	1	By-election due to the death of Pramod Mahajan
Rajeev Shukla	INC	03-Apr-2006	02-Apr-2012	1	
Sushilkumar Shinde	INC	03-Apr-2006	16-May-2009	2	Elected as member of parliament from Solapur Lok Sabha in 2009
Vasant Chavan	NCP	03-Apr-2006	11-Jul-2006	2	Died
Praful Patel	NCP	03-Apr-2006	16-May-2009	2	Elected as member of parliament from Bhandara–Gondiya Loksabha in 2009
Balavant Apte	BJP	03-Apr-2006	02-Apr-2012	2	
Manohar Joshi	SHS	03-Apr-2006	02-Apr-2012	1	
Vasant Chavan	NCP	25-Apr-2005	02-Apr-2006	1	By-election due to the resignation of Sanjay Nirupam
Shivraj Patil	INC	05-Jul-2004	22-Jan-2010	1	Appointed as Governor of Punjab
Vijay J. Darda	INC	05-Jul-2004	04-Jul-2010	2	
Tariq Anwar	NCP	05-Jul-2004	04-Jul-2010		
Sharad Joshi	SBP	05-Jul-2004	04-Jul-2010		
Sanjay Raut	SHS	05-Jul-2004	04-Jul-2010	1	
Pramod Mahajan	BJP	05-Jul-2004	03-May-2006	4	Died
Prithviraj Chavan	INC	03-Apr-2002	02-Apr-2008	1	
Murli Deora	INC	03-Apr-2002	02-Apr-2008	1	
Datta Meghe	NCP	03-Apr-2002	02-Apr-2008	1	
Mukesh Patel	NCP	03-Apr-2002	02-Apr-2008	2	
Ekanath Thakur	SHS	03-Apr-2002	02-Apr-2008	1	
Rajkumar Dhoot	SHS	03-Apr-2002	02-Apr-2008	1	
Ved Prakash Goyal	BJP	03-Apr-2002	02-Apr-2008	2	
Dilip Kumar	INC	03-Apr-2000	02-Apr-2006	1	
Praful Patel	NCP	03-Apr-2000	02-Apr-2006	1	
R. S. Gavai	RPI	03-Apr-2000	02-Apr-2006	1	
Sanjay Nirupam	SHS	03-Apr-2000	16-Mar-2005	2	Resigned
Balavant Apte	BJP	03-Apr-2000	02-Apr-2006	1	
Ram Jethmalani	BJP	03-Apr-2000	02-Apr-2006	2	
Satish Pradhan	SHS	05-Jul-1998	04-Jul-2004	2	
Pritish Nandy	SHS	05-Jul-1998	04-Jul-2004	1	
Pramod Mahajan	BJP	05-Jul-1998	04-Jul-2004	3	
Vijay J. Darda	Ind	05-Jul-1998	04-Jul-2004	1	
Suresh Kalmadi	INC	05-Jul-1998	16-May-2004	4	Elected as Member of Parliament from Pune in 2004
Najma Heptulla	INC	05-Jul-1998	04-Jul-2004	4	
Ram Kapse	BJP	27-Sep-1996	04-Jul-1998	1	By-election due to the resignation of Pramod Mahajan
Sanjay Nirupam	SHS	27-Sep-1996	02-Apr-2000	1	By-election due to the resignation of Suresh Kalmadi
Mukesh Patel	SHS	03-Apr-1996	02-Apr-2002	1	
Adhik Shirolkar	SHS	03-Apr-1996	02-Apr-2002	1	
Suryabhan Vahadane-Patil	BJP	03-Apr-1996	02-Apr-2002	1	
Ved Prakash Goyal	BJP	03-Apr-1996	02-Apr-2002	1	
Shankarrao Chavan	INC	03-Apr-1996	02-Apr-2002	3	
N. K. P. Salve	INC	03-Apr-1996	02-Apr-2002	4	
Suresh Keswani	Ind	03-Apr-1996	02-Apr-2002	1	
Vitthalrao Gadgil	INC	03-Apr-1994	02-Apr-2000	3	
Saroj Khaparde	INC	03-Apr-1994	02-Apr-2000	5	
Govindrao Adik	INC	03-Apr-1994	02-Apr-2000	2	
Suresh Kalmadi	INC	03-Apr-1994	10-May-1996	3	Elected as member of parliament from Pune Lok Sabha in 1996
Gopalrao Patil	BJP	03-Apr-1994	02-Apr-2000	1	
Ram Jethmalani	Ind	03-Apr-1994	02-Apr-2000	1	
Govindrao Adik	INC	03-Aug-1993	02-Apr-1994	1	By-election due to the resignation of Vishwarao Ramrao Patil
Shivajirao Girdhar Patil	INC	05-Jul-1992	04-Jul-1998		
Shrikant Jichkar	INC	05-Jul-1992	04-Jul-1998		
Sushilkumar Shinde	INC	05-Jul-1992	04-Jul-1998	1	
Najma Heptulla	INC	05-Jul-1992	04-Jul-1998	3	
Pramod Mahajan	BJP	05-Jul-1992	10-May-1996	2	Elected as member of parliament from Mumbai North East
Satish Pradhan	SHS	05-Jul-1992	04-Jul-1998	1	
Jagesh Desai	INC	03-Apr-1990	02-Apr-1996	2	
Chandrika Jain	INC	03-Apr-1990	02-Apr-1996	1	
Shankarrao Chavan	INC	03-Apr-1990	02-Apr-1996	2	
N. K. P. Salve	INC	03-Apr-1990	02-Apr-1996	3	
Ghulam Nabi Azad	INC	03-Apr-1990	02-Apr-1996	1	
Viren J. Shah	BJP	03-Apr-1990	02-Apr-1996	1	
Bapu Kaldate	JD	03-Apr-1990	02-Apr-1996	2	
Shankarrao Chavan	INC	28-Oct-1988	02-Apr-1990	1	By-election due to the resignation of N. M. Kamble
Murlidhar Bhandare	INC	03-Apr-1988	02-Apr-1994	3	
Vishvjit Singh	INC	03-Apr-1988	02-Apr-1994	2	
Vithalrao Jadhav	INC	03-Apr-1988	02-Apr-1994	2	
Suresh Kalmadi	INC	03-Apr-1988	02-Apr-1994	2	
Saroj Khaparde	INC	03-Apr-1988	02-Apr-1994	4	
Vishwarao Ramrao Patil	JD	03-Apr-1988	14-May-1993	1	resigned
A. G. Kulkarni	INC	05-Jul-1986	27-Apr-1992	4	Died
Bhaskar Masodkar	INC	05-Jul-1986	04-Jul-1992	1	
Najma Heptulla	INC	05-Jul-1986	04-Jul-1992	2	
Nareshkumar Puglia	INC	05-Jul-1986	04-Jul-1992	1	
Suryakanta Patil	INC	05-Jul-1986	15-Jun-1991	1	Elected as member of parliament from Nanded Lok Sabha
Pramod Mahajan	BJP	05-Jul-1986	04-Jul-1992	1	
Pratibha Patil	INC	05-Jul-1985	02-Apr-1990	1	By-election due to the resignation of Husen Dalwai
Maruti Mane Patil	INC	05-Jul-1985	04-Jul-1986	1	bBy-election due to the resignation of Premala Chavan
Husen Dalwai	INC	03-Apr-1984	28-Dec-1984	1	Elected as member of parliament from Ratnagiri Lok Sabha
Jagesh Desai	INC	03-Apr-1984	02-Apr-1990	1	
Shankarrao Deshmukh	INC	03-Apr-1984	02-Apr-1990	1	
Sudha Joshi	INC	03-Apr-1984	02-Apr-1990	1	
N. M. Kamble	INC	03-Apr-1984	09-Aug-1988	3	
N. K. P. Salve	INC	03-Apr-1984	02-Apr-1990	2	
Bapu Kaldate	JP	03-Apr-1984	02-Apr-1990	1	
Murlidhar Bhandare	INC	03-Apr-1982	02-Apr-1988	2	
Vishvjit Singh	INC	03-Apr-1982	02-Apr-1988	1	
Vithalrao Jadhav	INC	03-Apr-1982	02-Apr-1988	1	
Suresh Kalmadi	INC	03-Apr-1982	02-Apr-1988	1	
Saroj Khaparde	INC	03-Apr-1982	02-Apr-1988	3	
Dinkarao Govindrao Patil	INC	03-Apr-1982	02-Apr-1988	1	
Jagannath Akarte	INC	05-Jul-1980	04-Jul-1986	1	
Premala Chavan	INC	05-Jul-1980	28-Dec-1984	1	Elected as member of parliament from Karad Lok Sabha
Joseph L D'souza	INC	05-Jul-1980	04-Jul-1986	1	
Najma Heptulla	INC	05-Jul-1980	04-Jul-1986	1	
Shanti G Patel	JP	05-Jul-1980	04-Jul-1986	1	
S. W. Dhabe	IC(S)	05-Jul-1980	04-Jul-1986	2	
N. M. Kamble	INC	04-Aug-1980	02-Apr-1982	2	By-election due to the resignation of A. R. Antulay
Murlidhar Bhandare	INC	30-Jun-1980	02-Apr-1982	1	By-election due to the resignation of Vitthalrao Gadgil
Motiram Lahane	JP	14-Dec-1978	02-Apr-1980	1	By-election due to the death of Deorao Patil
Sushila Adivarekar	INC	03-Apr-1978	02-Apr-1984	3	
A. G. Kulkarni	INC	03-Apr-1978	02-Apr-1984	3	
Rafiq Zakaria	INC	03-Apr-1978	02-Apr-1984	1	
N. K. P. Salve	INC	03-Apr-1978	02-Apr-1984	1	
Sadasiv Bagaitkar	JP	03-Apr-1978	05-Dec-1983	1	Died
B. D. Khobragade	RPI	03-Apr-1978	02-Apr-1984	3	
Ganapat Hiralal Bhagat	Ind	03-Apr-1978	02-Apr-1984	1	
A. R. Antulay	INC	03-Apr-1976	03-Jul-1980	1	appointed as Chief minister of Maharashtra
Bapuraoji Deshmukh	INC	03-Apr-1976	02-Apr-1982	1	
Vitthalrao Gadgil	INC	03-Apr-1976	07-Jan-1980	2	Elected as member of parliament from Pune Lok Sabha
Saroj Khaparde	INC	03-Apr-1976	02-Apr-1982	2	
Govind Mhaisekar	INC	03-Apr-1976	02-Apr-1982	1	
S. K. Vaishampayen	Ind	03-Apr-1976	02-Apr-1982	2	
R. D. Avergaonkar - Jagtap	INC	03-Apr-1974	02-Apr-1980	1	
S. W. Dhabe	INC	03-Apr-1974	02-Apr-1980	1	
Jayant Shridhar Tilak	INC	03-Apr-1974	02-Apr-1980	2	
Deorao Patil	INC	03-Apr-1974	22-Oct-1978	1	Died
N. M. Kamble	INC	03-Apr-1974	02-Apr-1980	1	
Krishnarao Dhulap	PWPI	03-Apr-1974	02-Apr-1980	1	
Sushila Adivarekar	INC	03-Apr-1972	02-Apr-1978	2	
M. R. Vyas	INC	03-Apr-1972	02-Apr-1978	1	
Sikandar Ali Wajd	INC	03-Apr-1972	02-Apr-1978	1	
Gulabrao Patil	INC	03-Apr-1972	02-Apr-1978	2	
Saroj Khaparde	INC	03-Apr-1972	02-Apr-1974	1	By-election due to the death of Bhaurao Gaikwad
Vinaykumar Parashar	INC	03-Apr-1972	02-Apr-1978	1	
D. Y. Pawar	INC	03-Apr-1972	02-Apr-1978	4	
N.H. Kumbhare	RPI	03-Apr-1972	02-Apr-1978	1	
Sushila Adivarekar	INC	18-Sep-1971	02-Apr-1972	1	By-election
Vitthalrao Gadgil	INC	06-May-1971	02-Apr-1976	1	By-election due to the resignation of Mohan Dharia
Shankarrao Bobdey	INC	03-Apr-1970	02-Apr-1976	3	
Mohan Dharia	INC	03-Apr-1970	10-Mar-1971	2	Elected as member of parliament from Pune Lok Sabha
A. G. Kulkarni	INC	03-Apr-1970	02-Apr-1976	2	
S. G. Sardesai	CPI	03-Apr-1970	02-Apr-1976	1	
Narayan Ganesh Goray	SP	03-Apr-1970	02-Apr-1976	1	
Dahyabhai Patel	Ind	03-Apr-1970	11-Aug-1972	3	Died
Babubhai Maneklal Chinai	Ind	03-Apr-1970	04-Jul-1975	3	Died
Sarojini Babar	INC	03-Apr-1968	02-Apr-1974	1	
T. G. Deshmukh	INC	03-Apr-1968	02-Apr-1974	1	
Jayant Shridhar Tilak	INC	03-Apr-1968	02-Apr-1974	1	
Pandharinath Sitaramji Patil	INC	03-Apr-1968	02-Apr-1974	2	
B.T. Kulkarni	INC	03-Apr-1968	02-Apr-1974	2	
Bhaurao Gaikwad	RPI	03-Apr-1968	29-Dec-1971	2	Died
Gulabrao Patil	INC	03-Apr-1966	02-Apr-1972	1	
Asoka Mehta	INC	03-Apr-1966	26-Feb-1967	1	Elected as member of parliament from Bhandara Lok Sabha
B. S. Savnekar	INC	03-Apr-1966	02-Apr-1972	2	
Vithalrao Nagpure	INC	03-Apr-1966	02-Apr-1972	2	
B. D. Khobragade	RPI	03-Apr-1966	02-Apr-1972	2	
M. C. Chagla	Ind	03-Apr-1966	02-Apr-1972	3	
Shankarrao Bobdey	INC	03-Apr-1964	02-Apr-1970	1	
Kandubhai Desai	INC	03-Apr-1964	02-Apr-1970	2	
Mohan Dharia	INC	03-Apr-1964	02-Apr-1970	1	
S. K. Vaishampayen	INC	03-Apr-1964	02-Apr-1970	1	
Babubhai Maneklal Chinai	INC(O)	03-Apr-1964	02-Apr-1970	2	
Abid Ali Jaferbhai	INC(O)	03-Apr-1964	02-Apr-1970	4	
Udhavrao Patil	PWPI	03-Apr-1964	02-Mar-1967	1	
Dahyabhai Patel	Ind	03-Apr-1964	02-Apr-1970	2	
M. C. Chagla	INC	02-Mar-1964	02-Apr-1966	2	
B.T. Kulkarni	INC	05-Jul-1962	02-Apr-1968	1	By-election due to the resignation of M. C. Chagla
M. C. Chagla	INC	03-Apr-1962	17-Apr-1962	1	resigned
Ganpatrao Tapase	INC	03-Apr-1962	02-Apr-1968	1	
Pandharinath Sitaramji Patil	INC	03-Apr-1962	02-Apr-1968	1	
D. Y. Pawar	INC	03-Apr-1962	02-Apr-1968	3	
Tara Sathe	INC	03-Apr-1962	02-Apr-1968	1	
Bhaurao Gaikwad	RPI	03-Apr-1962	02-Apr-1968	1	
B. S. Savnekar	INC	28-Jun-1960	02-Apr-1966	1	By-election
Mahipatray Mehta	INC	03-Apr-1960	02-Apr-1966	1	Bombay State
Vithalrao Nagpure	INC	03-Apr-1960	02-Apr-1966	1	Bombay State
Narayan Deokinandan	INC	03-Apr-1960	02-Apr-1966	3	Bombay State
Dajiba Desai	PWPI	03-Apr-1960	02-Apr-1966	1	Bombay State
Shripad Krishna Limaye	Ind	03-Apr-1960	02-Apr-1966	1	Bombay State
Vinayakrao Pandurang Patil	Ind	03-Apr-1960	01-Dec-1962	1	Died
Kandubhai Desai	INC	09-Mar-1959	02-Apr-1964	1	bye - Bombay State

== INC MP list ==
Name	Party	Date of Appointment	Date of Retirement	Term	Vacation Date/Reason
Abid Ali Jaferbhai	INC	03/04/1952	02/04/1954	1	Bombay State
Abid Ali Jaferbhai	INC	03/04/1954	02/04/1958	2nd	Bombay State
Abid Ali Jaferbhai	INC	03/04/1958	02/04/1964	3rd	Bombay State
Violet Alva	INC	03/04/1952	02/04/1954	1	Bombay State
Violet Alva	INC	03/04/1954	02/04/1960	2nd	Bombay State MY 1960–66, KA 1966-69
Dr. Waman S Barlingay	INC	03/04/1956	02/04/1962	1	Bomaby State Madhya Pradesh 1952-56
Y. B. Chavan	INC	21/02/1963	21/12/1963	1	Res. Ele 3rd LS, Nashik
Narayandas K Daga	INC	23/04/1954	02/04/1958	1	Hyderabad State
R V Dangre	INC	03/04/1954	02/04/1960	1	Bombay State Died 25-6-79
Somnath P. Dave	INC	03/04/1952	02/04/1958	1	Bombay State
Somnath P. Dave	INC	03/04/1958	05/01/1959	2nd	Bombay State
T. R. Deogirikar	INC	03/04/1952	02/04/1956	1	Bombay State
T. R. Deogirikar	INC	03/04/1956	02/04/1962	2nd	Bombay State
Ramrao Madhavrao Deshmukh	INC	03/04/1952	02/04/1958	1	Bombay State
Ramrao Madhavrao Deshmukh	INC	03/04/1958	02/04/1964	2nd	Bombay State
Vimal Punjab Deshmukh	INC	19/04/1967	02/04/1972	1	
Venkat Krishna Dhage	INC	03/04/1952	02/04/1956	1	Hyderabad State
Venkat Krishna Dhage	INC	03/04/1956	02/04/1960	2nd	Hyderabad State Died 24-5-1967
Gangaram Thaware	INC	03/04/1952	16/08/1952	1	Madhya Pradesh State (1950–56) Dea 16/08/1952
Dr Raghu Vira	INC	03/04/1952	02/04/1956	1	Madhya Pradesh State1950-56
Dr Raghu Vira	INC	03/04/1956	02/04/1962	2nd	Bombay State
Lalchand Hirachand Doshi	INC	03/04/1952	02/04/1958	1	Bombay State
R. R. Diwakar	INC	03/04/1952	13/06/1952	1	Bombay State Res.-Gov. of BH NOM 1962-68
Marotirao D. Tumpalliwar	INC	03/04/1956	12/03/1962	1	Bombay State
Dr Gilder Munchershaw D. D.	INC	03/04/1952	02/04/1956	1	Bombay State
Dr Gilder Munchershaw D. D.	INC	03/04/1956	02/04/1960	2nd	Bombay State
Balchandra Maheshwar Gupte	INC	03/04/1952	02/04/1958	1	Bombay State
Shriyan Prasad Jain	INC	03/04/1952	02/04/1954	1	Bombay State
Shriyan Prasad Jain	INC	03/04/1954	02/04/1958	2nd	Bombay State
Kazi Syed Karimuddin	INC	03/04/1954	02/04/1958	1	Madhya Pradesh State (1950–56)
Bal Gangadhar Kher	INC	03/04/1952	14/07/1952	1	Res.14/07/1952 Bombay State
A. G. Kulkarni	INC	19/04/1967	02/04/1970	1	bye 1967
Premji Thobhanbhai Leuva	INC	07/08/1952	02/04/1954	1	Bombay State
Premji Thobhanbhai Leuva	INC	03/04/1954	02/04/1960	2nd	Bombay State
Gopaldas Bulakhidasji Mohta	INC	03/04/1952	02/04/1956	1	Madhya Pradesh State (1950-1956)
Lilawati Munshi	INC	03/04/1952	02/04/1958	1	Bombay state
Narayan Deokinandan	INC	03/04/1952	02/04/1954	1	Bombay State
Narayan Deokinandan	INC	03/04/1954	02/04/1960	2nd	Bombay State
P. N. Rajabhoj	INC	22/04/1957	02/04/1962	1	Bombay State bye 1957
Chandulal Pitamberdas Parikh	INC	03/04/1952	02/04/1954	1	Bombay State
Chandulal Pitamberdas Parikh	INC	03/04/1954	02/04/1958	2nd	Bombay State
Sonusing Dhansing Patil	INC	22/04/1957	02/04/1958	1	Bombay State bye 1957
Sonusing Dhansing Patil	INC	03/04/1958	02/04/1964	2nd	Bombay State
D. Y. Pawar	INC	03/04/1952	02/04/1956	1	Bombay State
D. Y. Pawar	INC	03/04/1956	02/04/1962	2nd	Bombay State
Dr V. H. Salaskar	INC	30/11/1981	02/04/1982	1	bye 1981
Manilal Chaturbhai Shah	INC	03/04/1952	02/04/1956	1	Bombay State
Manilal Chaturbhai Shah	INC	03/04/1956	02/04/1962	2nd	Death-09/01/1960 Bombay State

== SCF/PWP/RPI MP list ==
Name (Alphabetical)	Party	Date of Appointment	Date of Retirement	Term	Notes
Dr.B. R. Ambedkar	SCF	03/04/1952	02/04/1956	1	Bombay State
Dr. B. R. Ambedkar	SCF	03/04/1956	06/12/1956	2nd	Death 06/12/1956 Bombay State
B. D. Khobragade	RPI	19/04/1958	02/04/1964	1	Bombay State

== CPI/SBP MP list ==
Name (Alphabetical)	Party	Date of Appointment	Date of Retirement	Term	Notes
Lalji Moreshwar Pendse	CPI	03/04/1958	14/05/1964	1	Bombay State

== Others/IND MP list ==
Name (Alphabetical)	Party	Date of Appointment	Date of Retirement	Term	Notes
P. C. Alexander	Independent	29/07/2002	02/04/2008	1	
Babubhai Maneklal Chinai	Others	03/04/1958	02/04/1964	1	Bombay State
Narsinghrao Balbhimrao Deshmukh	Others	03/04/1952	02/04/1954	1	Bombay State
Narsinghrao Balbhimrao Deshmukh	Others	03/04/1954	02/04/1960	2	Bombay State
Gajanan Ramrao Kulkarni	Others	03/04/1956	02/04/1962	1	Bombay State
Rajaram Balkrishna Raut	Others	03/04/1952	15/03/1957	1	Bombay State
Dahyabhai Patel	Others	03/04/1958	02/04/1964	1	Bombay State

- Star (*) Represents current Rajya Sabha members from MH
