= 1978 Rajya Sabha elections =

Rajya Sabha elections were held in 1978, to elect members of the Rajya Sabha, Indian Parliament's upper chamber.

== Elections ==
Elections were held in 1978 to elect members from various states. The list is incomplete.

=== Members elected ===
The following members are elected in the elections held in 1978. They are members for the term 1978-84 and retire in year 1978, except in case of the resignation or death before the term.

State - Member - Party

Rajya Sabha members for term 1978-1984
State	Member Name	Party	Remark
Assam	Dinesh Goswami	INC	
Assam	Robin Kakati	INC	
Assam	Ajit Kumar Sharma	JAN	
Andhra Pradesh	B. Satyanarayan Reddy	JAN	
Andhra Pradesh	Buddha Priya Maurya	INC	
Andhra Pradesh	N.P. Chengalraya Naidu	INC	
Andhra Pradesh	Ghouse Mohiuddin Sheikh	INC	
Andhra Pradesh	Chadalavada Venkatrao	INC	dea 05/01/1981
Arunachal Pradesh	T Anjiah	INC	Res 19/02/1981
Arunachal Pradesh	Ratan Tama	INC	
Bihar	Dayanand Sahay	INC	
Bihar	Anand Prasad Sharma	INC	res 19/02/1983
Bihar	Yogendra Sharma	CPI	
Bihar	J K P N Singh	INC	
Bihar	Pranab Chatterjee	OTH	dea 02/06/1979
Bihar	Ram Lakhan Prasad Gupta	BJP	
Bihar	Shiv Chandra Jha	BJP	
Delhi	Jagannathrao Joshi	JAN	
Gujarat	Ibrahim Kalaniya	INC	
Gujarat	Piloo Modi	JAN	dea 29/01/1983
Gujarat	Ghanshyambhai Oza	JAN	
Gujarat	Manubhai Patel	JD	
Haryana	Sujan Singh	INC	res 31/12/1982
Haryana	Dr Sarup Singh	LD	
Himachal Pradesh	Mohinder Kaur	JAN	
Jammu & Kashmir	Khawaja Mubarak Shah	JKNC	res 10/01/1980 LS
Karnataka	Satchidananda	INC	
Karnataka	Ramakrishna Hegde	JP	res 23/05/1983 CM, KA
Karnataka	Maqsood Ali Khan	INC	
Karnataka	H R Basavaraj	INC	res 17/01/1980
Madhya Pradesh	Manhar Bhagatram	INC	
Madhya Pradesh	Vijaya Raje Scindia	BJP	
Madhya Pradesh	Baleshwar Dayal	JAN	
Madhya Pradesh	Dr Bhai Mahavir	JAN	
Madhya Pradesh	Ladli Mohan Nigam	JAN	
Madhya Pradesh	Jamuna Devi	OTH	
Maharashtra	B.D. Khobragade	RPI	
Maharashtra	N.K.P. Salve	INC	
Maharashtra	A. G. Kulkarni	INC	
Maharashtra	Sushila S Adivarekar	INC	
Maharashtra	Sadasiv Bagaitkar	JAN	dea 05/12/1983
Maharashtra	Ganpat Hiralal Bhagat	IND	
Maharashtra	Dr Rafiq Zakaria	INC	
Manipur & Tripura	Ng. Tompok Singh	INC	
Meghalaya	Alexander Warjri	IND	
Mizoram	Lalsawia	IND	
Nominated	Dr M S Adiseshiah	NOM	
Nominated	Fathema Ismail	NOM	
Nominated	Pandurang D Jadhav	NOM	
Nominated	Bhagwati Charan Varma	NOM	dea 05/10/1981
Orissa	Bhabani Charan Pattanayak	INC	
Orissa	Surendra Mohanty	INC	
Orissa	Dhaneswar Majhi	INC	
Orissa	Harekrushna Mallick	JD	
Punjab	Dr Rajinder Kaur	SAD	
Punjab	Harkishan Singh Surjeet	CPM	
Rajasthan	Bhim Raj	INC	
Rajasthan	Hari Shankar Bhabhra	BJP	
Rajasthan	Radheshyam R Murarka	JAN	
Tamil Nadu	V. Gopalsamy	DMK	
Tamil Nadu	V.V. Swaminathan	AIADMK	res 19/06/1980
Tamil Nadu	M Moses	INC	
Tamil Nadu	Dr Sathiavani Muthu	INC	
Tamil Nadu	Era Seziyan	JAN	
Tamil Nadu	V. Venka	DMK	
Uttar Pradesh	Kamlapati Tripathi	INC	res 08/01/1980 LS
Uttar Pradesh	Narendra Singh	JAN	
Uttar Pradesh	Jagdish Prasad Mathur	BJP	
Uttar Pradesh	Kalraj Mishra	BJP	
Uttar Pradesh	Dr M M S Siddhu	BJP	
Uttar Pradesh	G C Bhattacharya	LD	
Uttar Pradesh	Lakhan Singh	JAN	
Uttar Pradesh	K C Pant	INC	
Uttar Pradesh	Rameshwar Singh	LD	
Uttar Pradesh	Abdul Rehman Sheikh	JAN	
Uttar Pradesh	Surendra Mohan	JAN	
West Bengal	Amarprosad Chakraborty	FB	
West Bengal	Kanak Mukherjee	CPM	
West Bengal	Prof Saurin Bhattacharjee	RSP	
West Bengal	Ananda Pathak	CPM	09/01/1980
West Bengal	Syed Shahedullah	CPM	

== Bye-elections ==
The following bye elections were held in the year 1978.

State - Member - Party

1. Uttar Pradesh - Shiva Nandan Singh - JAN ( ele 20/03/1978 term till 1980 )
2. Madhya Pradesh - B Jamuna Devi - OTH ( ele 10/04/1978 term till 1980 )
3. Maharashtra - Motiram Lahane - JAN ( ele 14/12/1978 term till 1980 )
