= Vithalrao =

Vithalrao is a middle name and given name. People with the name include:

- Vithalrao Vikhe Patil
- Vithalrao Hande
- Vithalrao Jadhav
- Vithalrao Devidasrao Deshpande
- Gopalrao Vithalrao Patil
- Padmashri Dr. Vithalrao Vikhe Patil College Of Engineering
