= Devaki (disambiguation) =

Devaki is the mother of Krishna in Hinduism.

Devaki or Deoki may also refer to:

== People ==
- Devaki Jain, Indian economist
- Devaki Gopidas, Indian politician
- Devaki Krishnan, Malaysian-Indian politician
- Devaki Pandit, Indian classical singer
- Devaki Nandan Khatri, Indian writer and novelist
- Devaki Prasad, Indian chess player
- Devaki Vijayaraman, Indian chef
- Deoki Jatia, Indian philatelist
- Deoki Nandan Narayan, Indian politician
- Deoki Nandan Singh, Indian politician
- Andrew Deoki, Indo-Fijian statesman
- Ram Narayan Deoki, Indo-Fijian minister in the Methodist Church of Fiji and Rotuma
- Kollakkayil Devaki Amma, Indian forester

== Arts and entertainment ==
- Devaki (1951 film), 1951 Indian film
- Devaki (2005 film), 2005 Indian film
- Devaki (2019 film), 2019 Indian crime-thriller film

== See also ==
- Devki, 2001 Indian film
- Devki Group, Kenyan conglomerate, owned by Indo-Kenyan businessman Narendra Raval
