= Latur City Municipal Corporation =

Local civic body in Latur, Maharashtra, India

Municipal Corporation of Latur City

Type
- Type: Municipal Corporation of Latur
- Established: 25 October 2011

Leadership
- Mayor: Jayashri Sonkamble (INC)
- Commissioner: Smt. Mansi Meena, (IAS)

Structure
- Seats: 70
- Political groups: Government (47): INC (43); VBA (4); Opposition (23): BJP (22); NCP (1)

Elections
- Last election: 15 January 2026
- Next election: 2031

Meeting place
- Yashwantrao Chavan Hall, Main building of Corporation, Main road, Latur

Website
- mclatur.org

The Latur City Municipal Corporation (LCMC) also known as the Municipal Corporation of Latur City (MCLc) was established on 25 October 2011. The Maharashtra Government dissolved the council and approved forming a municipal corporation. Municipal Corporation mechanism in India was introduced during British Rule with formation of municipal corporation in Madras (Chennai) in 1688, later followed by municipal corporations in Bombay (Mumbai) and Calcutta (Kolkata) by 1762. Latur Municipal Corporation is headed by Mayor of city and governed by Commissioner. Latur Municipal Corporation has been formed with functions to improve the infrastructure of town.

== Revenue sources ==
The following are the Income sources for the Corporation from the Central and State Government.

=== Revenue from taxes ===
Following is the Tax related revenue for the corporation.

- Property tax.
- Profession tax.
- Entertainment tax.
- Grants from Central and State Government like Goods and Services Tax.
- Advertisement tax.

=== Revenue from non-tax sources ===
Following is the Non Tax related revenue for the corporation.

- Water usage charges.
- Fees from Documentation services.
- Rent received from municipal property.
- Funds from municipal bonds.

== List of municipal President & Vice President of Latur municipal council ==
No.	Name	Party	Term
1	Shivraj Patil	INC	1967-1969
2	Adv.Brijmohan Ramniwasji Agrawal	INC	1972-1973
3			
4	Vikram Ganpatrao Gojamgunde	INC	1989-1992
5	S R deshmukh	INC	1992-1996
5(a)	Adv.Vijaygopal Ramniwasji Agrawal	INC vice president (उपनगराध्यक्ष) municipal council	1992-1996
6			
7	Sharada Kamble	INC	1997-2002
8	Janardan Waghmare	NCP	2002-2007
9	Vyankat Bedre	INC	2007-2009
10	Laxman Kamble	INC	2009-2011

== List of mayors ==
#	Name	Term			Election	Party
1	Prof. Smita Khanapure	21 May 2012	2014		2012	Indian National Congress
2	Akhtar Shaikh	2014	13 May 2016		2012	Indian National Congress
3	Deepak Sul	13 May 2016	21 May 2017	1 year, 8 days	2012	Indian National Congress
4	Suresh Pawar	21 May 2017	21 November 2019	2 years, 184 days	2017	Bharatiya Janata Party
5	Vikrant Gojamgunde	22 November 2019	21 May 2022	2 years, 180 days	2017	Indian National Congress
6	Jayashri Sonkamble	5 February 2026	Incumbent	112 days	2025-26	Indian National Congress

== History ==
The municipal council of Latur was established in October 2011. As per existing law, the then Government of Maharashtra has decided to convert LCMC into a municipal corporation due to increasing population on the basis of the 2011 census data.

== Services ==
The following services are provided:

- Open sanitary sewage system
- All-weather roads
- Efficient and sustainable solid waste management
- Health coverage to all, focused more on the poor
- Primary education for the needy and library facility for all
- Upgrading of the amenities in the existing slums and alternative accommodation
- Clean, green, and pollution-free environment
- Places of healthy entertainment and recreation
- Fire service
- Efficient urban planning and development
- Transportation

== Administration ==
Latur City Municipal Corporation controls the whole administration of Latur. The executive power of the corporation is vested in the commissioner, an IAS officer or equal to appointed by the Maharashtra state government. The corporation consists of elected corporators headed by a mayor. The mayor has few executive powers. The total number of LMC members is 70. The LMC is in charge of the civic needs and infrastructure of the metropolis. Latur is divided into 18 municipal wards, each represent four members

City Representatives
Mayor	Smt. Jayashree Bhalchandra Sonkamble
Municipal Commissioner & Administrator	Smt. Mansi Meena
Dy. Mayor	Shri. Snehal Shrikant Utage
Leader of opposition
Superintendent of Police	Shri Amol Tambe, I.P.S.

== Corporation election ==
=== Political performance in 2012 election ===
The result of the 2012 election was as follows:

S.No.	Party name	Party flag or symbol	Number of Corporators
01	Indian National Congress (INC)		49
02	Shiv Sena (SS)		06
03	Nationalist Congress Party (NCP)		13
04	Republican Party of India		02

=== Political performance in 2017 election ===
The results of the 2017 election were as follows:

S.No.	Party name	Party flag or symbol	Number of Corporators
01	Bharatiya Janata Party (BJP)		36
02	Indian National Congress (INC)		33
03	Nationalist Congress Party (NCP)		01
04	Independents		0

=== Political performance 2025-26 election ===
The results of the 2025-26 election were as follows:

Party			Seats
Flag	Name	Symbol	Won
	Indian National Congress		43
	Vanchit Bahujan Aaghadi		4
	Bharatiya Janata Party		22
	Nationalist Congress Party		1
Total			70

== See also ==
- Latur Airport
- Marathwada
- Latur
