= Maneklal =

Maneklal is a given name and middle name. People with the name include:

- Maneklal Gandhi
- Maneklal Sankalchand Thacker
- Kanaiyalal Maneklal Munshi
- Ramanlal Maneklal Kantawala
- Babubhai Maneklal Chinai
