= Zulfiquar Memon =

Indian lawyer (born 1977)

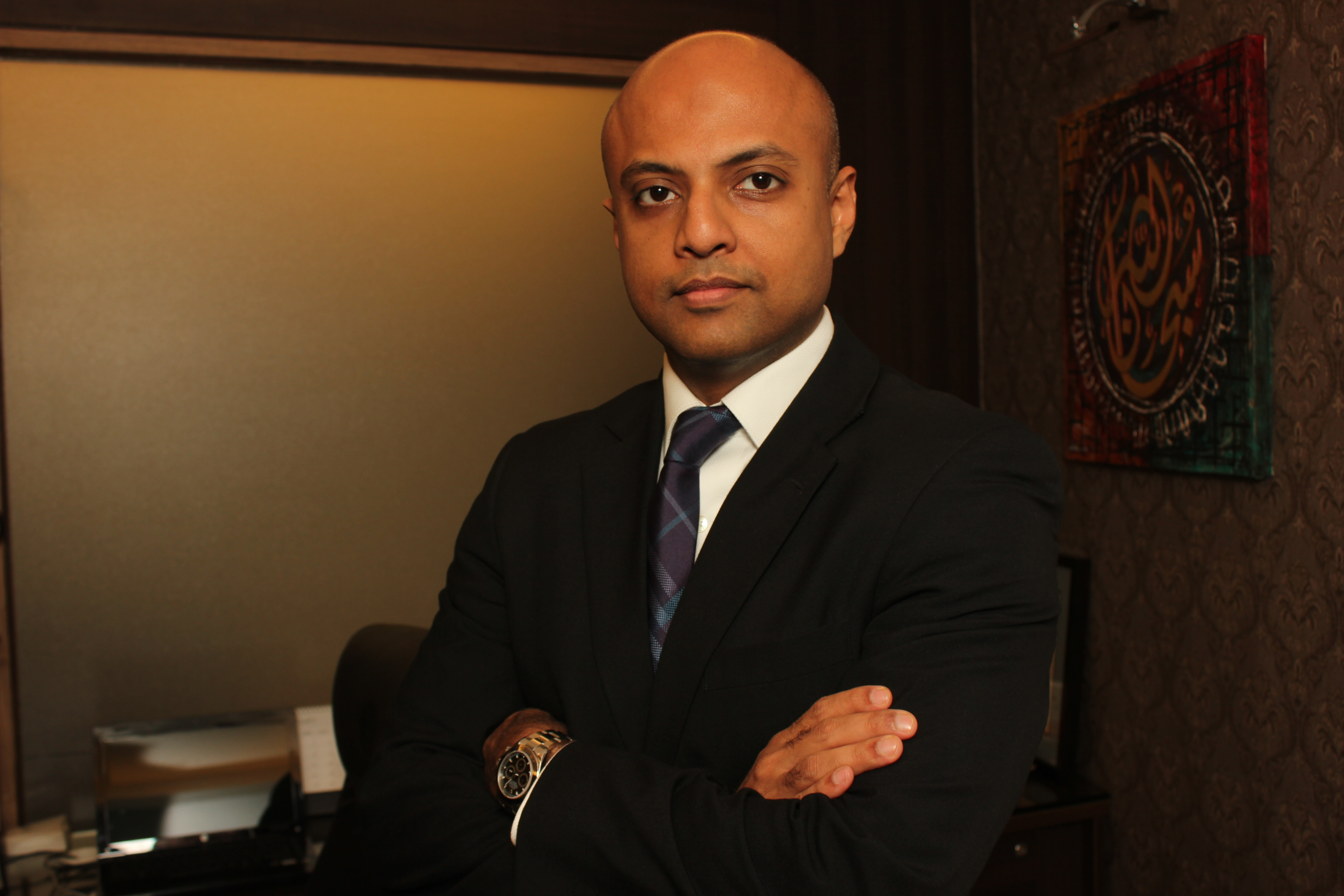
- Zulfiquar Memon
- Born: Mumbai, Maharashtra
- Occupation: Lawyer
- Spouse: Suzanne Memon
- Children: 2

Zulfiquar Memon (born 5 December 1977) is an Indian lawyer and the founder and managing partner of MZM Legal.

== Early life and education ==
Zulfiquar was born in Mumbai. Zulfiquar is the son of criminal lawyer and EX-Member of Parliament of India, A. Majeed Memon. Zulfiquar joined Government Law College, Mumbai in 1995 but left the law school to pursue international trade and commerce.

Zulfiqar eventually finished his degree from Pune University in 2005 and in the same year he founded MZM Legal.

== Legal career ==
Zulfiquar assisted his father, A. Majeed Memon in the Nadeem Saifee Extradition, which was won in the Bow Street Magistrate's Court in London followed by the appeal in the High Court and the House of Lords.

Zulfiquar founded MZM legal in 2005. Some of his clients are Standard Chartered Bank, ICICI Bank, Kotak Bank, The Netherland-based Prins Autogassystemen BV, Singapore based Global Schools, Tarun Tejpal, M Pallonji and Co., MF Hussain foundation, Kuwaiti Royal family, Punj Lyod, Essar Group, United Phosphorus Limited (UPL), Tata Trusts and Tata Sons. Zulfiquar has represented individuals like Rakesh Wadhawan and Sarang Wadhawan, Nirav Modi, Mehul Choksi, Dinesh Pandey—Bike Bot Scam, Airbus investigation, and Rashesh Shah—Edelweiss. Zulfiquar also closely works with large private banks on compliance issues.

He is currently a member of the International Bar Association, London Court of International Arbitration and International Chambers of Commerce (ICC). He is a member of the International Forbes Business Council, Young President's Organisation (YPO) and Entrepreneur's Organisation (EO).

== Accolades ==
Zulfiquar has been consistently ranked among the top individuals in India in the field of "White-Collar Crime" by Chambers & Partners.
