= B. S. Savnekar =

Indian politician

Member of Parliament of Rajya Sabha for Maharashtra
- In office 28 June 1960 – 2 April 1966

Member of Parliament of Rajya Sabha for Maharashtra
- In office 3 April 1966 – 2 April 1972
- Constituency: Maharashtra

Personal details
- Profession: Social worker, politician

B. S. Savnekar was an Indian politician, who was a member of Rajya Sabha (upper house) from 1960 to 1966 and 1966 and 1972. He was born in 1902 at Sawana in Bombay Presidency and was educated at Indore, Central Provinces. He was from Indian National Congress party.

== Positions held ==
#	From	To	Position
01	28 June 1960	2 April 1966	Member of parliament, Rajya Sabha
02	3 April 1966	2 April 1972	Member of parliament, Rajya Sabha

== See also ==
- List of Rajya Sabha members from Maharashtra
- 1966 Indian Rajya Sabha elections
- 1960 Indian Rajya Sabha elections
