= 2012 Maharashtra local elections =

2012 Maharashtra Local Body election
- 7 February 2012

Around 1224 to 10 Municipal Corporations
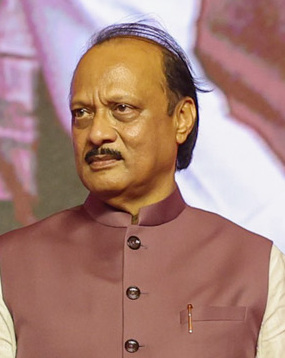

	Majority party	Minority party
Leader	Ajit Pawar	Prithviraj Chavan
Party	NCP	INC
Alliance	UPA	UPA
Seats won	265	264
	Third party	Fourth party
Leader	Uddhav Thackeray	Gopinath Munde
Party	SS	BJP
Alliance	NDA
Seats won	227	205

Elections for zila parishads and panchayat samiti were held on 7 February 2012. Municipal elections were held across various cities in Maharashtra, India on 16 February. In different cities elections results were mixed by party. The capital, Mumbai, resulted in a plurality for the Shiv Sena and the second largest city of Pune resulted in a Nationalist Congress Party plurality.

== Rules ==
According to the Election Commission of India's rules the day before, day of and day after the elections were a dry day in the jurisdictions that held elections.

== Parties ==
The parties that took part in the municipal elections were:

Contesting parties	Seats won	Bodies won
Nationalist Congress Party	265 / 1,224 (22%)	Pune; Pimpri-Chinchwad
Indian National Congress	264 / 1,224 (22%)	Solapur; Amravati
Shiv Sena	227 / 1,244 (18%)	Brihanmumbai; Thane
Bharatiya Janata Party	204 / 1,244 (16%)	Akola; Nagpur
Maharashtra Navnirman Sena	107 / 1,244 (9%)	Nashik
Others	177 / 1,244 (14%)	

== Results ==
The results by municipality were:

Brihanmumbai Mahanagar Palika

Party	Seats	
Shiv Sena	75	▼07
Bharatiya Janata Party	31	▲03
Indian National Congress	52	▼24
Nationalist Congress Party	13	▼01
Maharashtra Navnirman Sena	28	▲21
Others	28	▲01
Total	227	

Pune Municipal Corporation

Party	Seats	
Shiv Sena	15	▼05
Bharatiya Janata Party	26	▲01
Indian National Congress	28	▼07
Nationalist Congress Party	51	▲05
Maharashtra Navnirman Sena	29	▲21
Others	3	▼11
Total	152	

Nagpur Municipal Corporation

Party	Seats	
Shiv Sena	6	▼01
Bharatiya Janata Party	62	▲08
Indian National Congress	41	▲08
Nationalist Congress Party	6	▼02
Maharashtra Navnirman Sena	2	▲02
Bahujan Samaj Party	12	▲12
Others	16	▲16
Total	145	

Thane Municipal Corporation

Party	Seats	
Shiv Sena	53	▲07
Bharatiya Janata Party	7	▲07
Indian National Congress	18	▲01
Nationalist Congress Party	34	▼01
Maharashtra Navnirman Sena	2	▲02
Bahujan Samaj Party	2	▲02
Others	14	▲14
Total	130	

Pimpri-Chinchwad Municipal Corporation

Party	Seats	
Nationalist Congress Party	83	▲22
Indian National Congress	14	▼06
Shiv Sena	14	▼01
Bharatiya Janata Party	3	▲02
Maharashtra Navnirman Sena	4	▲04
Others	10	Steady
Total	128	

Nashik Municipal Corporation

Party	Seats	
Maharashtra Navnirman Sena	40	▲28
Nationalist Congress Party	20	▲03
Shiv Sena	19	▼01
Indian National Congress	15	▼06
Bharatiya Janata Party	14	▼06
Communist Party of India (Marxist)	3	▲03
Others	11	Steady
Total	122	

Solapur Municipal Corporation

Party	Seats	
Indian National Congress	45	▲05
Bharatiya Janata Party	25	▲10
Nationalist Congress Party	16	▲02
Shiv Sena	8	▼01
Communist Party of India (Marxist)	3	▼01
Bahujan Samaj Party	3	▲03
Others	2	▼01
Total	102	

Amravati Municipal Corporation

Party	Seats	
Indian National Congress	25	▼06
Nationalist Congress Party	17	▼02
Shiv Sena	10	▲09
Bharatiya Janata Party	7	▲01
Bahujan Samaj Party	6	▲03
Others	22	▼01
Total	87	

Ulhasnagar Municipal Corporation

Party	Seats	
Nationalist Congress Party	20	▲02
Shiv Sena	19	▲01
Bharatiya Janata Party	11	▲04
Indian National Congress	8	▼02
Bahujan Samaj Party	2	▲02
Maharashtra Navnirman Sena	1	▲01
Others	17	▲01
Total	78	

Akola Municipal Corporation

Party	Seats	
Bharatiya Janata Party	18	▲04
Indian National Congress	18	▼02
Shiv Sena	8	▲04
Nationalist Congress Party	5	▼03
Maharashtra Navnirman Sena	1	▲01
Others	23	▲11
Total	73	
