= Women's Cricket Association of India =

Former sports governing body, 1973–2007

- Abbreviation: WCAI
- Merged into: Board of Control for Cricket in India
- Formation: 1973
- Founder: Mahendra Kumar Sharma
- Founded at: Lucknow, Uttar Pradesh
- Defunct: November 2006
- Affiliations: International Women's Cricket Council

The Women's Cricket Association of India (WCAI) was the national governing body of women's cricket in India. It was founded in 1973 at Lucknow, Uttar Pradesh. The WCAI was merged into the Board of Control for Cricket in India (BCCI) in November 2006.

Its team, the India women's national cricket team, represented India in women's international cricket. The team is now governed by the BCCI, following the merger.

== History ==
While women played cricket in various parts of India in the early 1970's, there was no organization governing women's cricket. The first women's cricket club in India, named The Albees, was founded in Mumbai in 1969 by Aloo Bamjee, a member of the Cricket Club of India. Until 1972, The Albees did not have any opponents and organised matches amongst its 60 members.

In Lucknow, Mahendra Kumar Sharma began organising softball and handball tournaments for school and college girls in the city. A team organised by Sharma played at a softball tournament in Hyderabad in 1973. Following the tournament, the girls began playing cricket with the softball bats after witnessing boys playing the sport. This gave Sharma the idea to organise a cricket tournament. He personally traveled around the city in an auto rickshaw with a microphone to promote the event. Around 200 people attended the tournament held at the Queen’s Anglo Sanskrit College in Lucknow in 1973. The attendance encouraged Sharma to establish a women's cricket association.

The Women's Cricket Association of India (WCAI) was registered in Lucknow in 1973 under the Societies Act, with Sharma as the founder secretary. The first president of the WCAI was Hamida Habibullah. The WCAI organised the Women's Inter-State Nationals in Pune in April 1973. It was the first national-level, interstate women’s cricket competition in the country. Three teams - Mumbai, Maharashtra and Uttar Pradesh - participated in the inaugural edition of the tournament. The Mumbai team was captained by Diana Edulji. The second edition was held in Varanasi in December 1973 and featured eight teams. Following the tournament, the executive committee of the WCAI was reorganised. Chandra Tripathi and Premala Chavan became the chairperson and president of the WCAI respectively, alongside founder secretary Sharma. The third edition of the Women's Inter-State Nationals was held in Calcutta and featured 14 teams. Subsequent editions saw participation from all states in India.

The WCAI introduced new competitions in 1974. The Rani Jhansi Trophy, an inter-zonal limited overs tournament, was held at Kanpur, and an inter-university tournament was held at Rajkot. Sub-junior and junior tournaments were also introduced for under-15 and under-19 players. The WCAI was granted membership of the International Women's Cricket Council (IWCC) in 1973, and was recognized by the Government of India in 1978. The first international women's cricket match in India was held on 7 February 1975 against the touring Australian under-25 team. A series of three first-class matches were played in Pune, Delhi and Calcutta. Ujwala Nikam, Sudha Shah and Shreeroopa Bose captained the Indian team in the three matches respectively.

The first women's Test series in India was held in November 1976, when the West Indies toured the country. India played its first Test match on 31 October 1976 at the M. Chinnaswamy Stadium in Bangalore. India won the fourth Test in Patna on 19 November in front of 25,000 spectators, recording its first ever Test match victory. The six Test series ended in a 1–1 draw. India went on its first tour in January 1977 playing Tests against New Zealand and Australia. Due to the international boycott of South Africa, the 1978 Women's Cricket World Cup was shifted to India. The WCAI made a successful bid, and served as the primary organiser, with the IWCC providing only limited oversight. Sharma was the WCAI secretary for the first five years of its existence and was responsible for organising the 1978 World Cup.

Following the merger of IWCC into the International Cricket Council (ICC) in 2005, the WCAI was merged into the Board of Control for Cricket in India (BCCI) in November 2006. Ranee Narah and Shubhangi Kulkarni were the president and secretary of the WCAI respectively before the merger. Nutan Gavaskar, the sister of Sunil Gavaskar, was an honorary general secretary of WCAI. After the merger, Ranee Narah and Diana Edulji became BCCI board members.

== See also ==
- Cricket in India
- Women's Premier League (WPL)
- Sport in India
