= Priyanka Chaturvedi =

Indian politician (born 1979)

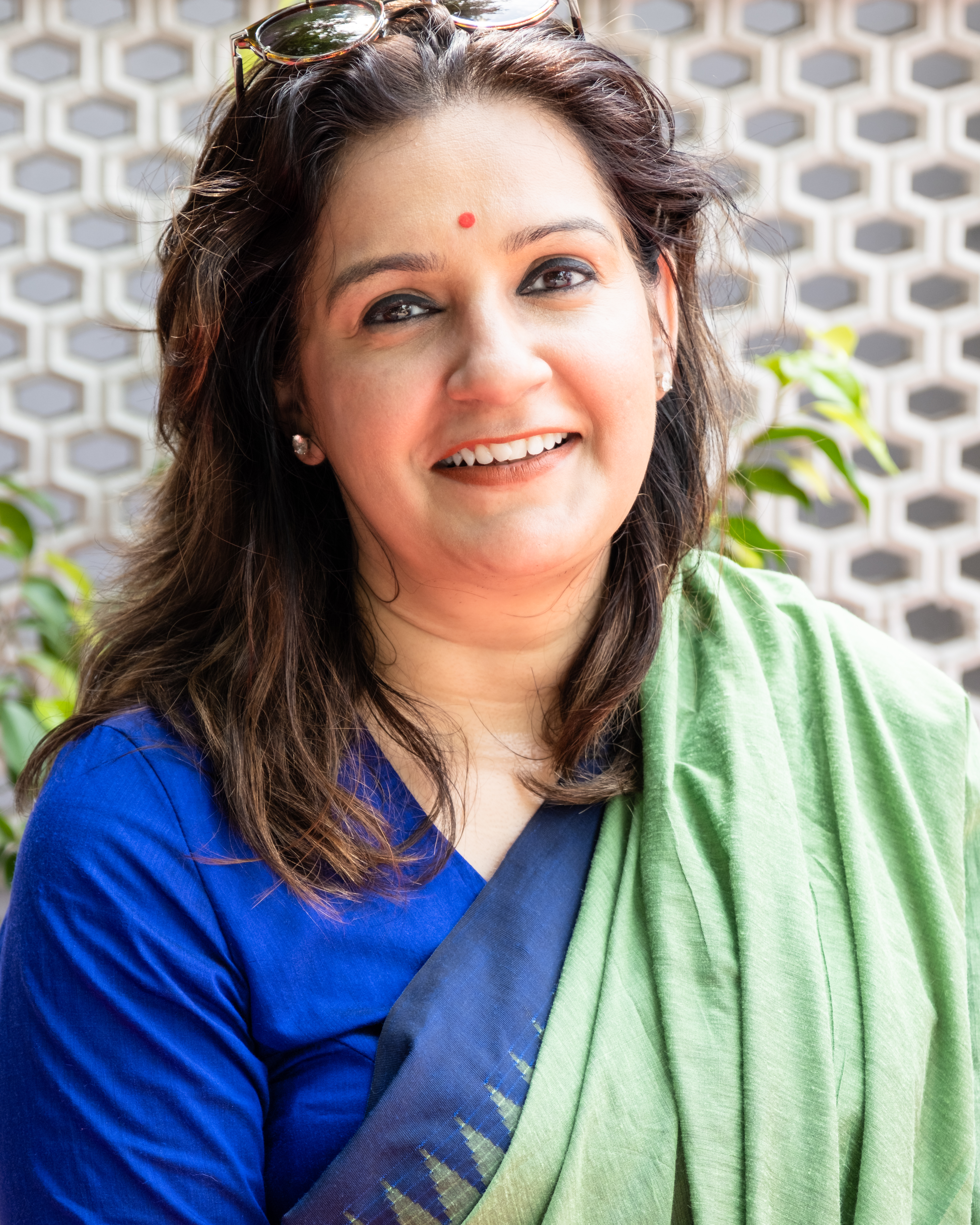
- Chaturvedi in 2025

Member of Parliament, Rajya Sabha
- In office 3 April 2020 – 2 April 2026
- Preceded by: Rajkumar Dhoot
- Succeeded by: Jyoti Waghmare
- Constituency: Maharashtra

Deputy Leader of Shiv Sena (UBT) in Rajya Sabha
- In office April 2022 – April 2026
- Leader: Sanjay Raut

Personal details
- Born: 19 November 1979 (age 46) Mumbai, Maharashtra, India
- Party: Shiv Sena (UBT) (since 2022)
- Other political affiliations: Indian National Congress (2010–2019); Shiv Sena (2019–2022)
- Spouse: Vickram Chaturvedi (m. 1999)
- Children: 2
- Occupation: Politician; columnist

Priyanka Chaturvedi (born 19 November 1979) is an Indian politician who served as a Member of Parliament, Rajya Sabha from Maharashtra and is a former Deputy Leader of Shiv Sena (UBT). Previously, she was one of the National Spokespersons of the Indian National Congress. She has also been a columnist for Tehelka, Daily News and Analysis and Firstpost. As a trustee of two NGOs, she works to promote children's education, women's empowerment and health. She also runs a book review blog which is amongst the top ten blogs of its type in India.

== Early life and education ==
Chaturvedi was born on 19 November 1979 and was raised in Mumbai. Her family hails from Mathura, Uttar Pradesh. She did her schooling at St. Joseph's High School in Juhu and graduated in commerce from the Narsee Monjee College of Commerce and Economics, Vile Parle, in 1999. She has been married to Vickram Chaturvedi since 19 November 1999 and has two children.

== Career ==
Chaturvedi started her career as director of MPower Consultants, a media, PR and event management company. She is a trustee of Prayas Charitable Trust, which runs two schools to provide education to under-privileged children. In 2010, she was selected as a participant in ISB's 10,000 Women Entrepreneurs Certificate programme, a global initiative supported by the Goldman Sachs Foundation for women entrepreneurs.

Chaturvedi hosts an interview programme called Meri Kahaani on Rajya Sabha TV.

== Politics ==
=== Indian National Congress ===
Chaturvedi joined the Indian National Congress in 2010, becoming general secretary of the Indian Youth Congress from North-West Mumbai in 2012.

Chaturvedi has a significant presence in social media and was known for defending the policies of the opposition Congress party on Twitter. She criticized Narendra Modi for not calling out Smriti Irani on lying and filing false affidavit of her educational credentials. Further, she took a dig at Irani by singing a parody of the theme of Irani's previous TV serial Kyunki Saas Bhi Kabhi Bahu Thi as "Kyuki Mantri Bhi Kabhi Graduate Thi".

On 17 April 2019, she posted on Twitter her dismay about the Uttar Pradesh Congress Committee reinstating some party workers who were earlier suspended for their unruly behavior with her, following which she resigned from the Congress and joined Shiv Sena.

=== Shiv Sena and Shiv Sena (UBT) ===
On 19 April 2019, Chaturvedi joined Shiv Sena in the presence of Uddhav Thackeray and Aditya Thackeray. At the time of joining Shiv Sena, she expressed to work as a common Shiv Sainik under the leadership of Uddhav Thackeray.

Following the 2022 Maharashtra political crisis and subsequent split of Shiv Sena, Chaturvedi joined the Uddhav Thackeray-led faction of the Sena, called Shiv Sena (Uddhav Balasaheb Thackeray).

== Overseas engagements ==
=== United Kingdom ===
In 2015, as a member of a delegation of young political leaders chosen by the UK High Commission and Commonwealth Parliamentary Association UK, Chaturvedi visited London to study and understand their democracy. She also participated in "Asian Forum on Global Governance" program jointly organized by Observer Research Foundation and Zeit Stiftung in the same year.

=== Australia ===
In February 2017, Chaturvedi spoke in Melbourne, Australia, on the topic “Challenges for the Indian economy post-demonetisation.”

During the same visit, she met with former Victorian Premier Ted Baillieu at the Victorian Parliament.

=== Operation Sindoor ===
In May–June 2025, Chaturvedi was part of India's multi party delegation that visited various countries, after India's Operation Sindoor.

== Positions held ==
- 2019 : Appointed as Deputy Leader of Shiv Sena
- 2020 : Elected as Member of Parliament, Rajya Sabha from Maharashtra

== See also ==
- Uddhav Thackeray ministry
