= Janardan Waghmare =

Indian politician (1934–2026)

Dr. Janardan M. Waghmare
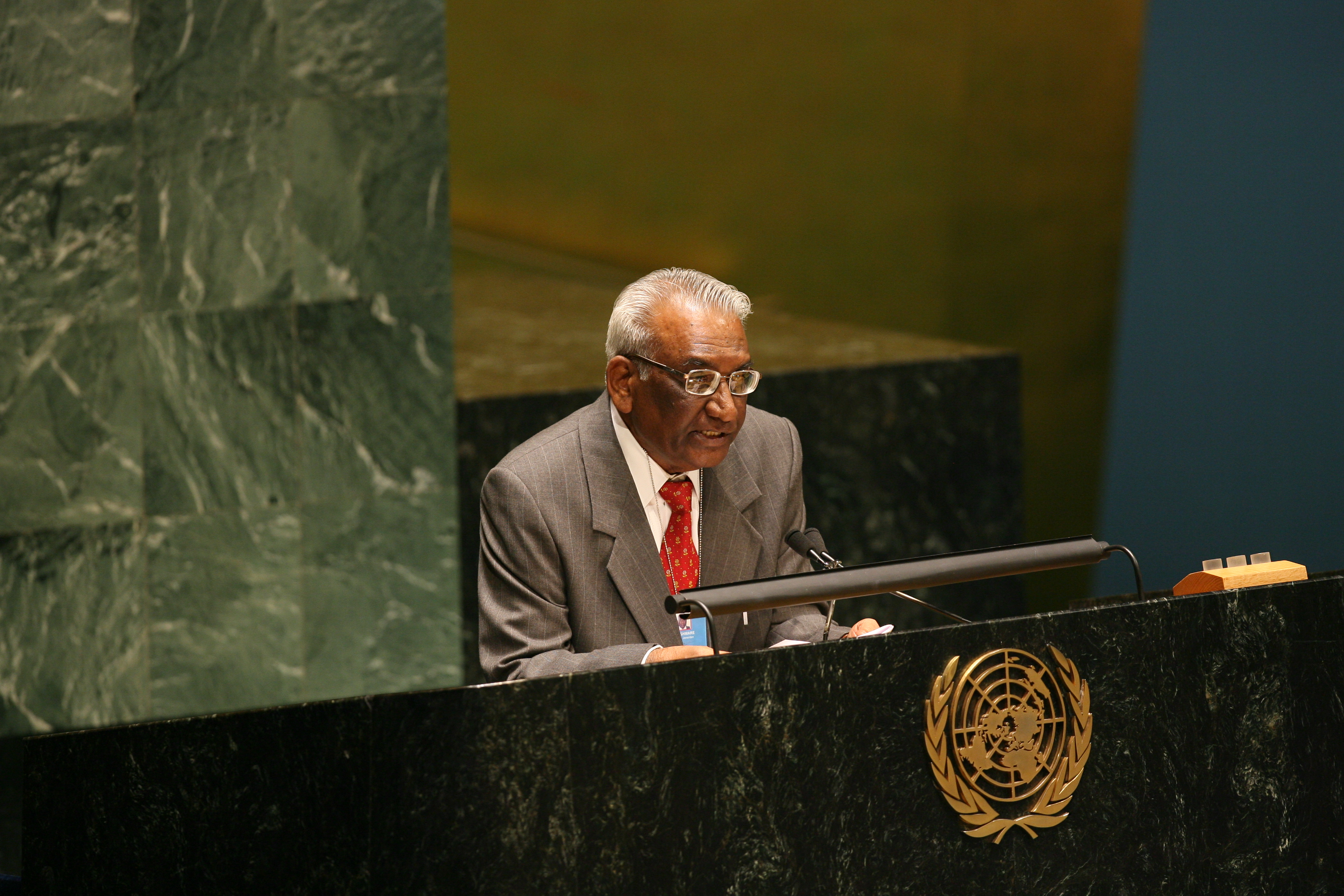
- Waghmare at the 64th United Nations General Assembly in 2009

Member of Parliament, Rajya Sabha
- In office April 2008 – April 2014
- Succeeded by: Majeed Memon
- Constituency: Maharashtra

President, Latur Municipal Council
- In office 2002–2007
- Preceded by: Sharada Kamble
- Succeeded by: Venkat Bedre

Vice-Chancellor, Swami Ramanand Teerth Marathwada University
- In office 1994–1999

Principal, Rajarshi Shahu College, Latur
- In office 1970–1994
- Succeeded by: Aniruddh Jadhav

Personal details
- Born: 11 November 1934 Janwal, Chakur taluka, Osmanabad district, Hyderabad State, India
- Died: 2 March 2026 (aged 91) Latur, Maharashtra, India
- Party: Nationalist Congress Party
- Spouse: Sulochana (m. 1962)
- Children: 3
- Parent(s): Rukminibai and Madhavrao Waghmare
- Education: Osmania University (BA); Pune University (MA); Dr. Babasaheb Ambedkar Marathwada University (PhD)(LLB)(LLM); Punjabi University, Patiala (D.Litt.(Hon.))
- Occupation: Author, Educationist/Professor, Social Worker, Social Reformer

Janardan Madhavrao Waghmare (11 November 1934 – 2 March 2026) was an Indian politician and educationist. He served as a Member of Parliament in the Rajya Sabha from Maharashtra. He was also the President of the Latur Municipal Council.

Waghmare also served as the Founder Vice Chancellor of Swami Ramanand Teerth Marathwada University, Nanded and as Principal of Rajarshi Shahu College, Latur. He was known as the architect of the famed Latur Pattern style that helped students from Marathwada rank high in competitive exams.

In 2022, Waghmare was awarded the Shahu Award for his work in the field of education.

Waghmare died in Latur on 2 March 2026, at the age of 91.

== Career ==
- Waghmare had 35 years of experience in teaching English language and literature.

As Lecturer in English

- Shiv Aurangabad, Omerga (Dist. Dharashiv) (1959–62)
- Dr. Babasaheb Ambedkar College, Aurangabad (1962–64)
- Deogiri College, Aurangabad (1964–70)

As Principal

- Rajarshi Shahu College, Latur (1970–94)

As Vice-Chancellor

- Swami Ramanand Teerth Marathwada University, Nanded (1994–1999)

== Member of Rajya Sabha ==
- Member of Rajya Sabha (2008–2014) and chief whip of NCP in Rajya Sabha

Parliamentary Committee Assignments

- Parliamentary Standing Committee on Agriculture.
- Parliamentary Standing Committee on Human Resources Development (HRD).
- Consultative Committee for the Ministry of External Affairs.
- Consultative Committee for the Ministry of Defence.
- Committee on Ethics (Twice)
- Committee on Subordinate Legislation.
- Committee on Member of Parliament Local Area Development Scheme (MPLAD)
- Select Committee on the Prevention of Torture Bill, 2010
- Committee on Subordinate Legislation
- Committee on Public Undertakings.
- Parliamentary Forum on Population and Public Health.
- Parliamentary Forum on Disaster Management.
- Advisory Committee on Hindi (Ministry of Agriculture, Government of India, New Delhi)
- India-Japan Parliamentary Friendship Group
- India-Iraq Parliamentary Friendship Group
- Court of North-Eastern Hill University, Shilong (Meghalaya)
- Court of Indian Maritime University, Chennai

== Privilege as a President ==
1. 5th Asmitadarsh Dalit Sahitya Sammelan, Kolhapur – 1979
2. 2nd Vidarbha Jana Sahitya Sammelan, Katol, Dist. Nagpur – 1984
3. National Integration and Social Justic Conference, Solapur – 1985
4. Dalit-Adivasi-Gramin Sahitya Sammelan, Nashik – 1988
5. Parivartan Sahitya Sammelan, Washi, New Mumbai – 1993
6. Marathwada Level Marathi Sahitya Sammelan, Hadgoan, Dist. Nanded – 1996
7. State Level Dalit Sahitya Sammelan, Barsi – 2000
8. Writes and Artists Sahitya Sammelan, Karvenagar, Varje, Pune – 2002
9. Maharashtra State Philosophy Conference, 22nd Convention, Latur – 2005
10. 14th Novodit Sahitya Sammelan, Udgir – 2007
11. President, 11th All India Dalit Literary Conference, Nagpur – 2011
12. President 38th Marathwads Sahitya Sammalen Soigaon, Aurangabad – 2016
13. President, Marathawada Vikas Parishad, Latur – 2019
14. President, Satyashodakh Samaj Shakottar Suvarna Mohotsavi Adhiveshan, Aurangabad – 2022

== Books published ==
1. अमेरिकन नीग्रो साहित्य आणि संस्कृती
2. महाराष्ट्रातील राजकारण व समाजकारण
3. हाक आणि आक्रोश
4. शिक्षण : समाज परिवर्तन व राष्ट्रीय विकास
5. प्राथमिक शिक्षण: यशापयश आणि भवितव्य
6. आजचे शिक्षण: स्वप्न आणि वास्तव
7. साहित्यचिंतन
8. समाज परिवर्तनाच्या दिशा
9. समाज परिवर्तन की दिशाएँ (अनुवादित)
10. चिंतन एका कुलगुरुचे
11. परिवर्तन: संकल्पना, वेध आणि वास्तव
12. जीवनरेखा (व्यक्ति चित्रे)
13. The Quest for Black Identity
14. एक शिक्षाविद् का चिंतन (अनुवादित)
15. चिंतनयात्रा
16. ज्ञान-विज्ञानाच्या देशात (प्रवास वर्णन)
17. व्यक्तिवलये (व्यक्ति चित्रे)
18. बखर एका खेड्याची (कादंबरी)
19. The Horizons And Beyond
20. संवाद (आकाशवाणीवरची भाषणे)
21. मूठभर माती (आत्मकथा)
22. चितन एका नगराध्यक्षाचे
23. स्वामी रामानंद तीर्थ यांचा शिक्षक धर्म
24. बदलते शिक्षण स्वरुप आणि समस्या
25. Sharad Pawar: A Profile in Leadership
26. स्वामी दयानंद सरस्वती: विचार, कार्य व कर्तृत्व
27. मंचन (ललित लेख)
28. मातीवरच्या ओळी (ललित लेख)
29. ध्यास परिवर्तनाचा (गौरव ग्रंथ)
30. विचारमुद्रा
31. महर्षि दयानन्द सरस्वती: विचार, कार्य और कृतित्व (अनुवादित)
32. लोकशाही आणि शिक्षण
33. सुख की पीडा (काव्य)
34. सहजीवन
35. दलित साहित्याची वैचारिक पार्श्वभूमी
36. दलित साहित्य की वैचारिक पृष्ठभूमि (अनुवादित)
37. संपादन: कर्तृत्वाचा सह्याद्रि
38. व्यक्तित्व आणि कर्तृत्व (व्यक्तिरेखा)
39. विमर्श
40. डॉ. बाबासाहेब आंबेडकरांचे क्रांतिकारक शैक्षणिक विचार आणि कार्य
41. माझे मूळ माझे कूळ (समीक्षा)
42. साहित्यचिंतन (अनुवादित)
43. स्वातंत्र्यः एक चितन
44. शरद पवार व्यक्तित्व, कर्तृत्व आणि नेतृत्व
45. My Days In Parliament
46. डॉ. बाबासाहेब आंबेडकर आणि जातिअंताचा लढा
47. राष्ट्रनायक डॉ. बाबासाहेब आंबेडकर
48. गुलामी एक दृष्टिक्षेप
49. यमुनेचे पाणी
50. व्यक्तिवेध (व्यक्तिचित्रे)
51. बाबासाहेब आंबेडकर संवैधानिक विचार आणि धर्मचिंतन (पुस्तिका)
52. नवमहाराष्ट्राचे शिल्पकार यशवंतराव चव्हाण
53. व्यक्तिवेध (व्यक्ति चित्रे)
54. अमेरिकन ब्लॅक लिटरेचर
55. शिक्षा साहित्य और मानवीय मूल्य
56. उषःकाल होता होता......
57. सत्ता, समाज और संस्कृति (अनुवादित)
58. लोकतंत्र और शिक्षा (अनुवादित)
59. वाटा विचारांच्या
60. गुलामी : इतिहास के आईने में (अनुवादित)
61. सत्ता, समाज आणि संस्कृती
62. नव्या दिशेचा शोध
63. व्यक्तिरंग (व्यक्ति चित्रे)
64. साहित्य : प्रबोधन आणि परिवर्तन
65. शब्दचि आमुच्या जीवाचे जीवन
66. तत्वज्ञ महाराजा सयाजीराव गायकवाड
67. हैद्राबाद स्वातंत्र्यलढ्याचे अंतरंग
68. राष्ट्रच्या शोधात भारत

== Awards for books ==
- On his literature, 2 researchers earned M.Phil. and 6 completed Ph.D. degrees to date.
1. अमेरिकन निग्रो: साहित्य आणि संस्कृती - महाराष्ट्र शासन (1983)
2. हाक आणि आक्रोश - महाराष्ट्र शासन (1990)
3. साहित्य चिंतन - महाराष्ट्र शासन (1994)
4. आजचे शिक्षण: स्वप्न आणि वास्तव - महाराष्ट्र साहित्य परिषद, पुणे (1994)
5. समाज परिवर्तनाच्या दिशा - महाराष्ट्र साहित्य परिषद, पुणे (1994)
6. चिंतन यात्रा - महाराष्ट्र तत्त्वज्ञान परिषद, पुणे (2003–04)
7. बखर एका खेड्याची (कादंबरी) - ह. भ. दादासाहेब साजळकर सह. पतसंस्था जिल्हा सातारा, ना. ह. आपटे ग्रंथ पुरस्कार (2006)
8. मुठभर माती (आत्मकथा) - जै. धोंडीराम माने विकास प्रबोधिनी, छत्रपती संभाजीनगर (2006)
9. मुठभर माती (आत्मकथा) - महाराष्ट्र शासन (2007)
10. बदलते शिक्षण: स्वरूप आणि समस्या - महाराष्ट्र शासनाचा उत्कृष्ट वाड्म़य कर्मवीर भाऊराव पाटील पुरस्कार (2009)
11. बदलते शिक्षण: स्वरूप आणि समस्या - डॉ. रा. जो. प्रभुजे पुरस्कार, कराड (2010)
12. बदलते शिक्षण: स्वरूप आणि समस्या - महाराष्ट्र साहित्य परिषद, पुणे ज. ह. पाटील ग्रंथ पुरस्कार (2010)
13. शरद पवार: व्यक्तित्व कर्तुत्व आणि नेतृत्व - महाराष्ट्र शासन यशवंतराव चव्हाण वाड्म़य पुरस्कार (2017)

== Awards and honours ==
1. Phule-Ambedkar Literary Award – (Phule-Ambedkar Sahitya Panchayat, Satara) (1988)
2. Meritorious and Ideal Teacher Award at the University Level – (Govt. of Maharashtra) (1990–91)
3. Dr. Ambedkar Dalit Mitra Award – (Govt. of Maharashtra) (1993–94)
4. Shahu Ratna Award – (Shahu College, Latur) (1994)
5. Late Yashwantrao Chavan Memorial Award – (Zilla Parishad, Beed) (1994)
6. Dr. Ambedkar Visisht Seva Puraskar – (Dalit Sahitya Academy, New Delhi) (1994)
7. Maharashtra Foundation Award – (For the book, Directions of Social Change) (1994)
8. Late P.Y. Deshpande Memorial Chandrabhaga Teeri Award for Literature – (1999)
9. Marathwada Gaurav Puraskar – (2001)
10. Lalbahadur Shashtri Seva Gaurav Puraskar – (2002)
11. Maharashtra Gourav Puraskar – (Social Integration Institute, Parbhani) (2003)
12. Rashtriya Ekta Award – (Image Welfare Achievers Forum, Mumbai) (2004)
13. Late Narhar Kurundkar Puraskar – (2003)
14. Samajik Samrasta Award – (Venkatesh Secondary and Higher Secondary School, Gategaon, Taluka Latur) (2003)
15. Satyashodhak Award – (Dinkarrao Jawalkar Memorial, Pune) (2004)
16. Maharashtra Bhooshan Award – (Maharashtra State Freedom Fighters Committee, Aurangabad) (2005)
17. Sushil Social Forum Award, Solapur – (For Educational Work) (2006)
18. Maharshi Vitthal Ramji Shinde Award – (R.N. Chavan Foundation, Wai, Dist. Satara) (2008)
19. Kavi Vishnu Bhave Award – (Mahur, Dist. Nanded) (2008)
20. Maniratna Award – (Padmashri Dr. Manibhai Desai Manav Seva Trust, Urli-Kanchan, Dist. Pune) (2009)
21. Samata Puraskar – (Milind College, Aurangabad) (2011)
22. Jiwan Sadhana Award – (Swami Ramanand Teerth Marathwada University, Nanded- Maharashtra) (2012)
23. Kaifi Azmi Award – (Balraj Sahani-Sahir Ludhianavi Foundation, Pune) (2013)
24. Matsyodari Education Award – (Matsyodari Education Society, Jalna) (2013)
25. Rajashi Shahu Award – (Rajashi Shahu Foundation, Latur) (2014)
26. Icon of Latur – (Daily Lokmat, Aurangabad) (2015)
27. Padmashri Vitthalrao Vikhe Patil Sahitya Seva Jeevan Gaurav Award – (Padmashri Vitthalrao Vikhe Patil Co-Operative Sugar Factory, Pravaranagar (Dist. Ahmadnagar) (2016)
28. Itihas Sanshodhak Dr. Appasaheb Pawar Award – (Maharashtra Itihas Parishad) (2016)
29. Dr. Yeshwant Manohar Award – (Dr. Yeshwant Manohar Award Committee, Nagpur) (2018)
30. Late A. K. Priyolkar Memorial Award for Research – (Mumbai University, Mumbai) (2021–22)
31. Rajarshi Shahu Award – (Rajarshi Shahu Chattrapati Memorial Trust, Kolhapur) (2022)
