= Dajisaheb Chavan =

Indian politician

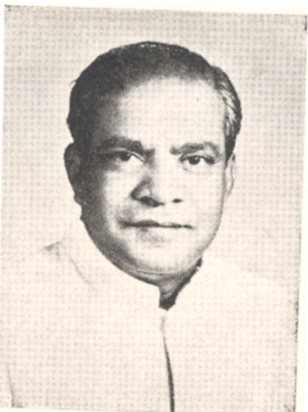

Member of Parliament Lok Sabha
- In office 1957–1973
- Preceded by: Constituency does not exist
- Succeeded by: Premala Chavan
- Constituency: Karad

Personal details
- Born: 22 August 1916 Kumbhargaon, Satara, Maharashtra
- Died: 8 July 1973 (aged 56)
- Party: Indian National Congress
- Spouse: Premala Chavan (m. 1942)
- Children: Prithviraj, Nirupama, Vidyulata
- Parent: Ramrao Chavan
- Occupation: Politician

Dajisaheb Ramrao Chavan (22 August 1916 – 8 July 1973) was an Indian politician and served as a Member of parliament, Lok Sabha for 16 years. A member of the Indian National Congress, he was the former Union Deputy Minister for Defence and Law. His wife, Premala, represented his Lok Sabha seat after his death. Their son Prithviraj was Chief Minister of Maharashtra from 2010 to 2014.

== Early life ==
Dajisaheb Chavan was born at Kumbhargaon, in the Satara district of Maharashtra, to Ramrao Chavan. He was educated at Rajaram College, Sykes Law College, and Bombay University, completing his M.A. and LL.M. He was married to Premala, who also made a name herself in politics. They had three children: Prithviraj, Nirupama Ajitrao Yadav, and Vidlyullata Vyankatrao Ghorpade.

== Political career ==
Dajisaheb Chavan was among the early members of the All-India Peasants' and Workers' Party (शेतकरी कामगार पक्ष), a party founded in 1947 as an offshoot of the dominant Indian National Congress. He was elected from Karad seat to Lok Sabha in 1957 as the party's candidate, defeating Swami Ramanand Bharati of Congress. He left the party in 1960 to join Congress. He represented the seat in Lok Sabha until his death in 1973, winning elections in 1962, 1967 and 1971 elections as Congress candidate.

Prior to his participation in the Lok Sabha, Chavan was a member of the Satara District Local Board and a member of the Bombay Legislative Council.

=== Ministry experience ===
Dajisaheb Chavan was the Deputy Minister of the Ministry of Defence from 1962 to 1964, the Ministry of Food and Agriculture from 1964 to 1966 and the Ministry of Labour Employment and Rehabilitation from 1967 to 1969.

From 1969 to 1971, he was the Minister of State in the Ministry of Petroleum and Chemicals and Mines and Metals. Later, in 1971, he became the Minister of Supply.

== Death ==
Dajisaheb Chavan died on 8 July 1973.
