= Vandana Chavan =

Indian politician and advocate

Vandana Hemant Chavan
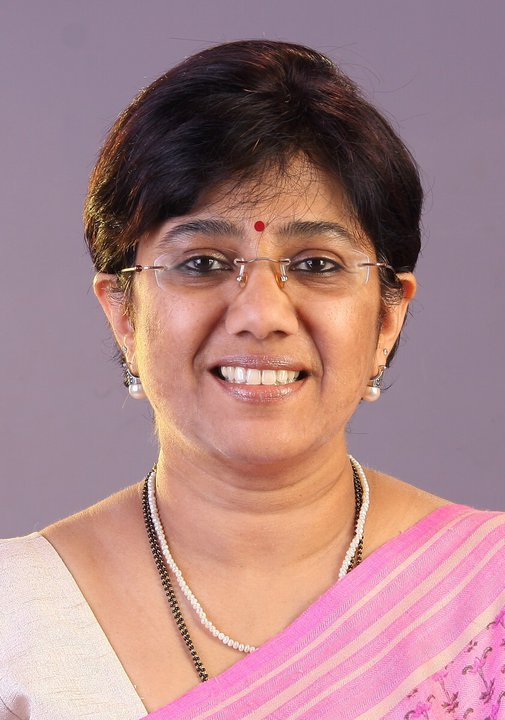

Member of Parliament Rajya Sabha
- In office 3 April 2012 – 2 April 2024
- President: Ram Nath Kovind
- Chairman: Venkaiah Naidu
- Constituency: Maharashtra

Panel of Vice-Chairman Rajya Sabha
- In office 18 September 2020 – 2 April 2024
- President: Ram Nath Kovind
- Prime Minister: Narendra Modi
- Chairman: Venkaiah Naidu

Mayor of Pune
- In office 1997–1998

Personal details
- Born: 6 July 1961 (age 65) Pune, Maharashtra, India
- Party: Nationalist Congress Party
- Spouse: Hemant Chavan
- Children: Two daughters - Divya and Priyanka.
- Website: Official website

Vandana Hemant Chavan (born 6 July 1961), is an Indian politician and advocate. She was a member of the Parliament of India, representing Maharashtra in the Rajya Sabha (Upper House of the Indian Parliament). She is from the Nationalist Congress Party (NCP) and has been a member of Parliament from 2012 till 2024.

== Early life ==
Vandana Chavan was born in Pune, where she spent her early childhood. Her father, the late Vijayarao Mohite was a veteran lawyer and her mother Jayashree Mohite retired as a part-time lecturer in law. She is married to Hemant Chavan, a prominent lawyer. Her sister Vinita Kamte was married to the late Ashok Kamte, a martyr in the 26/11 Mumbai attack. Her other sister, Justice Revati Mohite-Dere is a distinguished lawyer who was subsequently elevated as a judge of the Hon'ble Bombay High Court.

== Political career ==
She was elected mayor of Pune for the period of March 1997 – 1998. In that period she was Vice-Chairperson of All India Council of Mayors and also she was Chairperson of Maharashtra State Mayor, President and Councillors Organisation. As mayor, she incorporated the concept of the Bio Diversity Park (BDP) into the development plan of the fringe villages, amid resistance from within and outside her party. Suresh Kalmadi who initially mentored her and gave her a break in politics, Chavan preferred to shift to the NCP.

== Books published ==
1. Law of Cruelty, Abetment of Suicide and Dowry Death (Co-author), 1993.
2. Green India-Clean India, Swapna Udyachi-Sundar Jagachi (a reference book in Marathi on climate change), 2011.
