= Fathema Ismail =

Indian parliamentarian

Fathema Ismail (1903–1987) was an Indian parliamentarian. She was awarded the Padma Shri in 1958 and was nominated as member of the Rajya Sabha from 1978 and served till 1984. She was the sister of Usman and Umar Sobhani who financed the Khilafat movement and the Congress party in Bombay. Fathema Ismail was instrumental in the setting up of the children orthopaedic hospital in Bombay which was the first of its kind in India.

== Sources ==
- Brief Biodata
