= Rajarshi Shahu College, Latur =

College in Maharashtra, India

Rajarshi Shahu Mahavidyalaya, Latur
- Other name: RSML
- Motto: आरोह तमसो ज्योती
- Type: Public
- Established: 1970
- Founder: Dr. Gopalrao Patil
- Accreditation: UGC, MSBSHSE
- Principal: Mahadev H.Gavhane
- Location: Latur, Maharashtra, India, India
- Website: www.shahucollegelatur.org.in

Rajarshi Shahu Mahavidyalaya, Latur (R.S.M.L.) is a higher secondary education institution in the Latur, Maharashtra, India. The college was a pioneer in the development of the "Latur Pattern", which has been adopted and implemented by many other colleges across the state.

== Establishment ==
The college was established in 1970 by the Shiv Chhatrapati Shikshan Sanstha (Shiv Chhatrapati Educational Institution), Latur. Shahu's first principal was Dr.Janardhan Madhavrao Waghmare, who was the first pillar of Latur Pattern. The college has consistently produced Maharashtra State level toppers in the Higher Secondary School Certificate Examination (10+2) of the Maharashtra State Board of Secondary and Higher Secondary Education, Pune and the Common Entrance Test for four-year bachelor's degree courses in Medical and Engineering fields.

== Recognition ==
The college is also famous for the Chartered Accountant's examination preparation. Students who are willing to be Chartered Accountants do their higher secondary education and a three-year bachelor's degree in Commerce stream (B.Com.) and then take the Chartered Accountant's course. There is a large contribution of this college in creating and popularizing the "Latur Pattern". Mr. Anirudh Jadhav has major contributions in creating the Latur Pattern and making it widely known throughout India. In 2004, RSML started Biotechnology UG and PG under visionary of Dr. Gopalrao Patil and Directorship of Prof. Vishwas Shembekar, which gives major turn to the college in terms of Research & Development at National and International level. The college has enrolled more than four thousand students (including Junior College).

== Staff ==
The total staff includes 77 teachers in the Senior College, 78 non-teaching staff and 63 teachers in the Junior College (Class 11 and 12).

== Departments ==
The college mainly conducts preparatory courses for the following competitive entrance examinations: MHT-CET, All India Engineering Entrance Examination (AIEEE), Maharashtra Public Service Commission (MPSC), Master of Business Administration (MBA) and MS-CIT (Maharashtra State Certificate in Information Technology). There are 21 departments including 7 Post Graduate departments. The college also offers courses such as Russian language, Additional English (second language), Sanskrit, Pali and Functional English (a vocational subject), M.Phil. (Geography). The teachers of Marathi, Pali, Geography, Economics, Sociology, Chemistry, Zoology & Fishery Science, Biotechnology and Physics guide the Ph.D. aspirants. The college introduced computer courses in 1998 on a non-grant basis. It is thus catering to the needs of higher secondary and higher education in this region.

In 2013, the college became autonomous. Educational batch of 2013-2014 is the first batch of degree college as autonomous grade.

== Courses offered ==
=== Degree courses ===
#	Course	Duration	Eligibility
01	B.Sc. C.S.	Three Years (Six Semesters)	10+2 Pass with Science Stream or Its equivalent
02	BCA	Three Years (Six Semesters)	10+2 Pass with Any Stream or Its Equivalent
03	B.Sc. (General)	Three Years (Six Semesters)	10+2 Pass with Science Stream or Its Equivalent
04	B.Sc. B.T.	Three Years (Annual Pattern)	10+2 Pass with Science Stream
05	B.Lib. & I.Sc.	One Year (Semester Pattern)	Any Graduate
06	B.Com.	Three Years (Six Semesters)	10+2 Pass or its equivalent
07	B.A.	Three Years (Six Semesters)	10+2 Pass or its equivalent

Competitive Examination Center Rajarshi Shahu Prabhodhini

=== Postgraduate courses ===
#	Course	Duration	Eligibility
01	M.Sc. C.S.	Two Years (Four Semesters)	B.Sc. C.s., B.C.A., B.Sc. with CS/IT/Comp. App., B.E.(CS)
02	M.Sc. (Bio-Tech)	Two Years (Four Semesters)	Any Science Graduate
03	M.Com.	Two Years (Four Semesters)	B.Com. Graduate
04	M.A. (Economics)	Two Years (Four Semesters)	B.A. with Economics
05	M.A. (Geography)	Two Years (Four Semesters)	B.A. with Geography
06	M.A. (Sanskrit)	Two Years (Four Semesters)	B.A. with Sanskrit
07	M.Sc. (Photonics)	Two Years (Four Semesters)	
09.	M.A English	Two years four semesters	
10.	M.Sc. Chemistry	Two years four semesters	
11.	M.Sc. Zoology	Two years four semesters	
12.	M. A. Political Science	Two years four semesters	
13.	M.Sc. Botany	Two Years four semesters	

=== Research courses ===
#	Course	Duration	Eligibility
01	M.Phil. (Geography)	One Year	M.A or M.Sc. in geography.
