= Deoki Jatia =

Indian philatelist (1930–2000)

Deoki Nandan Jatia (1930 – 12 November 2000) was an Indian philatelist who was added to the Roll of Distinguished Philatelists in 1983.
