= Sarojini Babar =

Indian politician (1920-2008)

- Born: 7 January 1920; Bagani, Sangali District, British India
- Died: 20 April 2008 (aged 88); Pune
- Education: Mumbai University (MA, PhD)
- Occupations: Writer and politician
- Writing career
- Language: Marathi
- Website: www.sarojinibabar.com

Sarojini Babar (January 7, 1920 – April 20, 2008) was a Marathi writer and a politician from Maharashtra, India.

== Early life ==
Sarajini Babar was born on January 7, 1920, in the town of Bagani in Sangli District of Maharashtra. After finishing her high school studies in Islampur, she joined S.P College in Pune and secured her bachelor's degree from Mumbai University in 1944. Subsequently, she obtained her master's and doctoral degrees also from Mumbai University.

She was a member of the legislative assembly of Maharashtra state during 1952–57 (from Shirala Walva constituency, in Sangli District) and 1963–66. She was a member of Indian Rajya Sabha during 1968–74.Dr Babar was the chairman of the Maharashtra State Folklore Committee, Maharashtra Sahitya Parishad and Maharashtra Lok Sahitya Parishad.

Since 1950, for many years Babar was the editor of Samaj Shikshan Mala (समाज शिक्षण माला) magazine. The Maharashtra state government instituted MRLS in 1953 to see to the cultural enrichment of Marathi people through literature. Since 1961, Dr Babar was the head of the Maharashtra Rajya Loksahitya Samiti (MRLS) for 32 years.

== Literary work ==
=== Novels ===
- Kamalache Jale (कमळाचं जाळं) (1946)
- Ajita (अजिता) (1953)
- Athawatey Tewadhe Sangate (आठवतंय तेवढं सांगते) (1955)
- Swayamwar (स्वयंवर) (1979)

=== Collection of poems ===
- Jholana (झोळणा) (1964)

=== Other works ===
- Wanita Saraswat (वनिता सारस्वत) (1961)
- Stri Shikshanachi Watchal (स्त्रीशिक्षणाची वाटचाल) (1968)
- Striyanche Khel Ani Gani (स्त्रियांचे खेळ आणि गाणी) (1977)
- Mi Pahilele Yashawantrao (मी पाहिलेले यशवंतराव) (1988)
- Karagiri (कारागिरी) (1992)
- Rajvilasi Kevda (1969/1970) includes poem by Smt Mandakini Shankarrao Thorat
