= Satish Pradhan =

Indian politician (1940–2024)

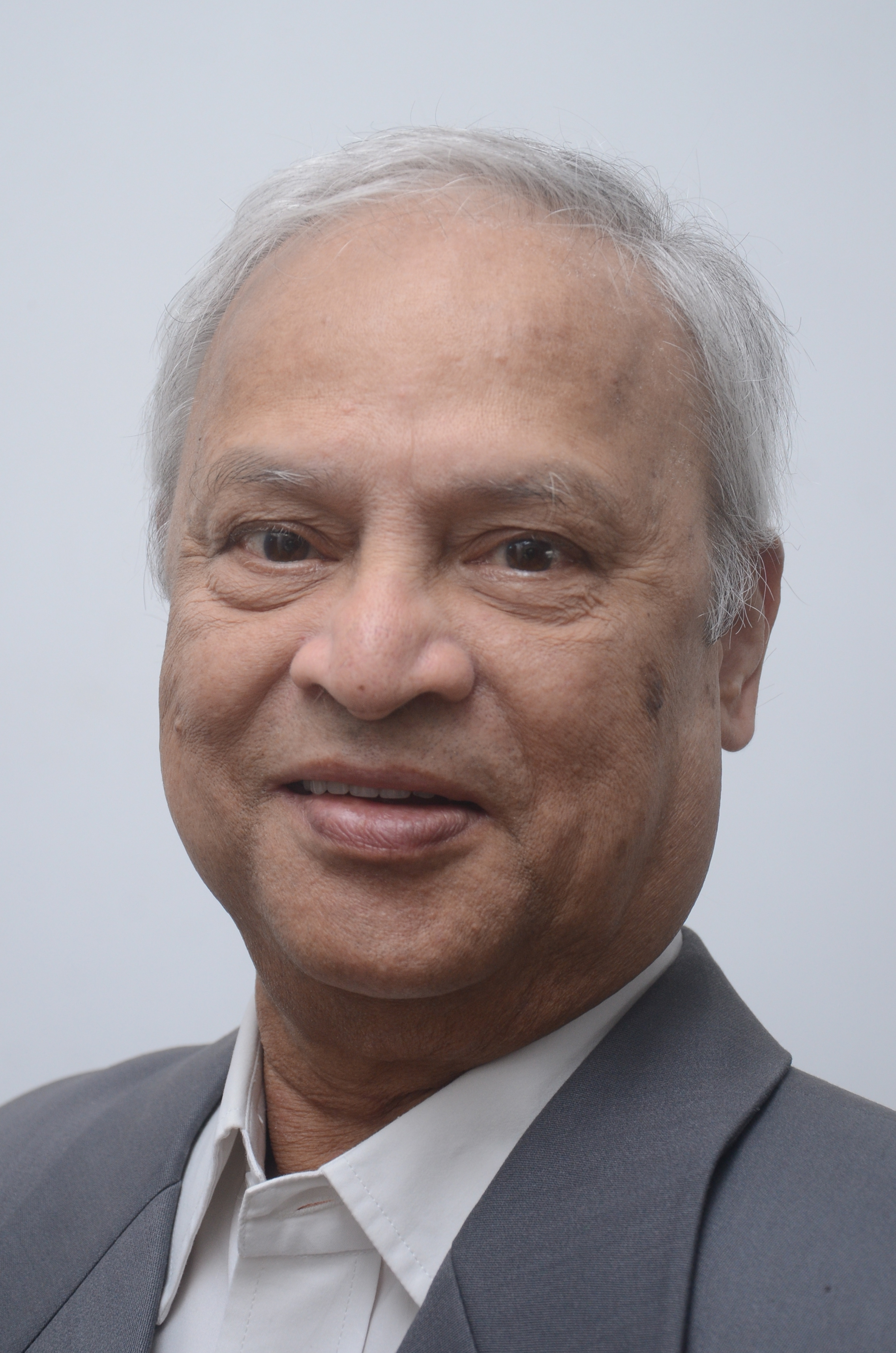

Satish Pradhan (29 August 1940 – 29 December 2024) was an Indian politician who was the first mayor of Thane from 1974 to 1981. He played a major role in establishing the Shiv Sena in the city. From 1986 to 1987, he served as the first mayor of Thane. He was a member of Rajya Sabha from Maharashtra for the two terms of 5 July 1992 to 4 July 1998 and 5 July 1998 until his death. He belonged to Shiv Sena and was the Leader of Shiv Sena Party in Rajya Sabha. Pradhan died on 29 December 2024, at the age of 84.
