= Majeed Memon =

Indian politician

Member of Parliament of Rajya Sabha
- In office 3 April 2014 – 2 April 2020
- Preceded by: Janardan Waghmare
- Succeeded by: Fouzia Khan
- Constituency: Maharashtra

Personal details
- Born: 12 December 1945 (age 80) Mumbai, Maharashtra
- Party: TMC
- Spouse: Shrimati Saeeda
- Children: Zulfiquar Memon
- Profession: Politician, Lawyer

Majeed Memon (born 12 December 1945) is an Indian Politician. He was a Member of Parliament in Rajya Sabha of India from Maharashtra. He is a criminal lawyer by profession and was a leader of Nationalist Congress Party. In December 2022, he joined Mamata Banerjee's Trinamool Congress.

== Career ==
Memon is a Member of Parliament (M.P) of Rajya Sabha. He is a noted criminal lawyer who defended Indian personalities including politicians, human rights activists and film actors. He defended high-profile Indians overseas in various extradition matters. Memon is also a human rights activist.

Memon has also represented the many suspects of 1993 serial blasts in Mumbai. He has also defended several film stars and big personalities in criminal cases.

== Attack ==
In July, 2005 Majeed Memon was shot at by unknown persons. Later criminal charges were filed.

== Personal life ==
Majeed Memon is the father of Zulfiquar Memon and Zaheer Memon. Zulfiquar Memon is a Managing Partner of MZM Legal LLP a leading full service law firm in India.
