= Rajkumar Dhoot =

Indian politician

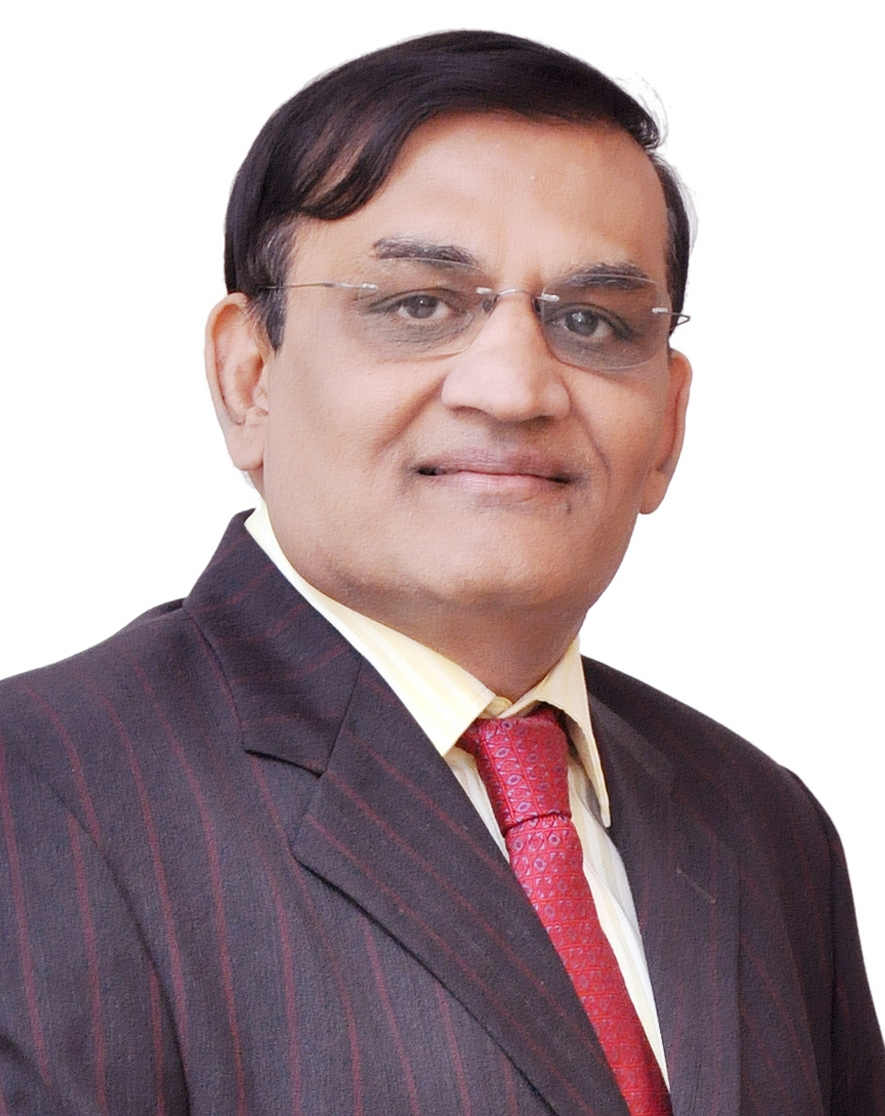
- Profile Photo of Dhoot

MP of Rajya Sabha for Maharashtra
- In office 3 April 2014 – 2 April 2020
- Succeeded by: Priyanka Chaturvedi
- Constituency: Maharashtra
- In office 2008–2014
- In office 2002–2008

Personal details
- Born: 11 September 1955 (age 71) Ahmednagar, Maharashtra
- Party: Shiv Sena
- Education: S.B. College, Aurangabad (B.Com. Honors)
- Profession: Politician, Industrialist

Rajkumar Dhoot (born 11 September 1955) is a Member of the Parliament (Rajya Sabha) representing the State of Maharashtra, India, as a member of the Shiv Sena party. He is the ex-president of the Apex Indian Chamber of Commerce & Industry, ASSOCHAM and Promoter & Co-Owner of the diversified Videocon Group of Companies. His father Shri Nandlal Madhavlal Dhoot, was an Indian Industrialist and the founder of Videocon Group.

== Early life ==
Rajkumar Dhoot was born in Ahmednagar, Maharashtra, India on 11 September 1955 and graduated with Honours in Commerce from the S.B. College, in Aurangabad.

== Politics ==
Dhoot was first elected to the Rajya Sabha in April 2002 and served the Parliamentary Standing Committee on Finance, Consultative Committees for the Ministry of Commerce and Industry and the Ministry of Urban Development & Poverty Alleviation. He has been a regular member of the Consultative Committee of the Ministry of Finance & Special invitee of the Consultative Committee for the Ministry of Communications & IT and for the Ministry of Petroleum & Natural Gas. He was a special invitee to the Consultative Committee for the Ministry of Information and Broadcasting (India). In April 2008, he was re-elected to Rajya Sabha for a second term and had been a Member of the Standing Committee on IT apart from being a Member of the Hindi Salahkar Samiti of the Ministry of Textiles. He was re-elected for a third term for the Rajya Sabha in 2014.

Currently, he is a member of the Standing Committee on Health & Family Welfare. He has introduced Private Members Bills in the Rajya Sabha. His areas of focus include the prevention of suicides of farmers of Maharashtra, the welfare of pavement dwellers and slum dwellers of Mumbai. He regularly writes to Union Ministers and Chief Minister of Maharashtra for the redressal of problems of Mumbai and rest of Maharashtra.

As a third-term senior parliamentarian, Dhoot actively campaigned with his party chief, Uddhav Thackeray, and other Shiv Sena leaders in the key cities of Maharashtra such as Kolhapur, Nashik, Shirdi, Aurangabad, Ratnagiri amongst others before the general elections 2014 and also in the Maharashtra State Assembly Elections in 2014.

In the winter session of the Parliament in November 2014, Dhoot introduced 3 Bills – The Constitution (Amendment) Bill, 2014 (amendment of Article 371 on special provision with respect to the states of Maharashtra and Gujarat), The Illegal Immigrants and Missing Foreign Nationals Identification and Deportation Authority of India Bill, 2014, and The Homeless Pavement Dwellers (Welfare) Bill, 2014.

== Chamber work and other interests ==
At the end of the two terms as a member of Parliament in the Rajya Sabha, Dhoot was elected as the President of the Apex Industry body, The Associated Chambers of Commerce and Industry of India (ASSOCHAM) by its Managing Committee on 21 February 2012. He held this position till 19 July 2013.

Dhoot held office as the Senior Vice President of ASSOCHAM in 2011–2012 and earlier was an active member of the industry body, and he was the first Parliamentarian to become the President of ASSOCHAM. Dhoot ended his tenure with the Annual event of ASSOCHAM in July 2013, which had the Prime Minister of India as the Chief Guest. Dhoot continues to be closely associated with ASSOCHAM as its Past President and plays an active role in its affairs.

Dhoot was president of Marathwada Industries Association, now Chamber of Marathwada Industries & Agriculture (CMIA) in 1994–1995.

== Rajya Sabha Election History ==
| Position | Party | Constituency | From | To | Tenure |
|---|---|---|---|---|---|
| Member of Parliament, Rajya Sabha (1st Term) | SS | Maharashtra | 3 April 2002 | 2 April 2008 | 5 years, 365 days |
| Member of Parliament, Rajya Sabha (2nd Term) | INC | Maharashtra | 3 April 2008 | 2 April 2014 | 5 years, 364 days |
| Member of Parliament, Rajya Sabha (3rd Term) | SS | Maharashtra | 3 April 2014 | 2 April 2020 | 5 years, 365 days |

== Philanthropy ==
Dhoot runs a leading multi-Super Specialty Charitable Hospital – 'Nandlal Dhoot Charitable Hospital' at Aurangabad with an investment of over ₹100 crores from primary to all tertiary level health care facilities to help the people suffering from critical and life-threatening conditions.
