= Ratan Tama =

Indian politician

Ratan Tama (born 23 September 1946) is an Indian politician from Arunachal Pradesh belonging to the Indian National Congress.

He was Member of Rajya Sabha for the term 27 May 1978 to 26 May 1984 from Arunachal Pradesh. He was Secretary of Janata Party during 1977–1978.

He is married to Shrimati Rotom Yak and has one daughter and three sons; he lives at Raga in Lower Subansiri district.
