= Saroj Khaparde =

Indian politician

Personal details
- Born: 1941 (age 84–85)
- Party: Indian National Congress party

Saroj Khaparde is an Indian politician from Maharashtra. Khaparde is the second-longest serving Member of the Parliament at the Rajya Sabha, serving five terms, second only to Najma Heptulla who served six. She was a close aide to Indira Gandhi, and accompanied Indira Gandhi on all of her trips.

== Career ==
Khaparde belonged to the Indian National Congress party. The five terms at the Rajya Sabha that she served were from 1972 to 1974, 1976–1982, 1982–1988, 1988-1994 and 1994–2000. She was the Union Minister of State of India holding portfolios of Health and Family Welfare and Textiles from 1986 to 1989. She was the vice-chairman of the Rajya Sabha from 1994 to 2000. She also chaired several boards in the Rajya Sabha during her tenure. She was the Chairman of the House Committee from 1982 to 1984, the Committee on Government Assurances, from 1996 to 98 and the Committee on Subordinate Legislation, in 1996 and then from 1998 to 2000.

Khaparde also introduced 28 private-member bills in the Rajya Sabha, some of which are stated below.

Khaparde introduced the Housewives (Compulsory Weekly Holiday from Domestic Chores) Bill in 1996. The bill provides that notwithstanding any custom, convention, ritual and tradition, it shall be the duty of family members, particularly that of the head of the family, to ask every housewife to select a particular day of the week as holiday from all domestic chores so as to enable the housewife to take rest and enjoy the day according to her wishes. The day would free her of all domestic responsibilities, leaving it upon the other family members. Not only this, the Bill provided for compensation in the shape of a fine which may extend to Rs. 1000 on any family member contravening its provisions. But all hopes were dashed to the ground and the bill was criticized by general public, and could not be introduced and passed, because it was felt that it is not possible to implement or regulate it practically in Indian homes.

She introduced a bill in 1987 in the Rajya Sabha to amend the Indian Medical Council Act, 1956. The amendment was to address the lack of uniformity in the standards of medical education at all levels in the country, and because the Central Government or the Medical Council had no control over the admission, courses and establishment of medical colleges in the country. The bill proposed a regulation of the practice of medicine in India.

Khaparde also introduced a bill in 1995 to amend the Indecent Representation Of Women (Prohibiiton) Act 1986, which was adopted by the parliament.

Margaret Alva, in her biography Courage & Commitment, wrote of a dramatic incident wherein Khaparde stormed into the Rajya Sabha carrying the blood-stained saree of a raped Dalit woman to demand justice for violence against Dalit women and accuse the Home Minister, Charan Singh, of being anti-SC.

== Rajya Sabha Election History ==
Position	Party	Constituency	From	To	Tenure
Member of Parliament, Rajya Sabha (1st Term)	INC	Maharashtra	3 April 1972	2 April 1974	1 year, 364 days
Member of Parliament, Rajya Sabha (2nd Term)	INC	Maharashtra	3 April 1976	2 April 1982	5 years, 364 days
Member of Parliament, Rajya Sabha (3rd Term)	INC	Maharashtra	3 April 1982	2 April 1988	5 years, 365 days
Member of Parliament, Rajya Sabha (4th Term)	INC	Maharashtra	3 April 1988	2 April 1994	5 years, 364 days
Member of Parliament, Rajya Sabha (5th Term)	INC	Maharashtra	3 April 1994	2 April 2000	5 years, 365 days
