= D. Y. Pawar =

Indian politician

Dhairyashilrao Yeshwantrao Pawar

Member of Parliament, Rajya Sabha
- In office 1952-1978
- Constituency: Maharashtra

Personal details
- Born: 1922
- Died: 2003 (aged 80–81)
- Party: Indian National Congress

Dhairyashilrao Yeshwantrao Pawar was an Indian politician. He was a Member of Parliament representing Maharashtra in the Rajya Sabha the upper house of India's Parliament as member of the Indian National Congress.
