= Jagesh Desai =

Indian politician (1926–2012)

Member of Parliament, Rajya Sabha
- In office 1984–1996
- Constituency: Maharashtra

Personal details
- Born: 8 February 1926
- Died: 4 October 2012 (aged 86)
- Party: Indian National Congress

Jagesh Desai (8 February 1926 – 4 October 2012) was an Indian politician. He was a Member of Parliament representing Maharashtra in the Rajya Sabha the upper house of India's Parliament as member of the Indian National Congress. Desai died on 4 October 2012, at the age of 86.
