= Y. P. Trivedi =

Indian politician

Yogendra Premkrishna Trivedi

Member of Parliament (Rajya Sabha)
- In office 2008–2014
- Constituency: Maharashtra State

Personal details
- Born: 6 January 1929 (age 97) Surat
- Party: Nationalist Congress Party
- Children: 2 sons

Yogendra Premkrishna Trivedi is a member of the Nationalist Congress Party of India. He was member of the board of directors of Reliance Industries.

He was Member of the Parliament of India representing Maharashtra in the Rajya Sabha, the upper house of the Parliament. He graduated with a B.Com., after which he did LL.B. He has travelled extensively throughout the world. He was the President of Cricket Club of India and currently is a member. He is an eminent lawyer of the Supreme Court of India.

He also served as the chairman of JK Sports Foundation from 2 April 2008 to 2 April 2014.

He was born and brought up in Surat. Currently, he lives in Malabar Hill, Mumbai.
