= Jagannath Sitaram Akarte =

Indian politician

- Born: 14 September 1906
- Occupations: Lawyer; Politician
- Years active: 1962-1986

Jagannath Sitaram Akarte was a leader of Congress(I) from Amravati, Maharashtra, India. He was a lawyer by profession and was a member of the Rajya Sabha from 5 July 1980 to 4 July 1986.

He was born on 14 September 1906 and married to Shrimati Shantabai Akarte. He was also a Member of the Maharashtra Legislative Council from 1962 to 1968.

He was survived by six sons and one daughter.
