= Manubhai Patel =

Indian politician

Member of Parliament, Rajya Sabha
- In office 1978-1984
- Constituency: Gujarat

Personal details
- Party: Janata Party
- Spouse: Pramoda

Manubhai Motilal Patel is an Indian politician. He was a Member of Parliament, representing Gujarat in the Rajya Sabha the upper house of India's Parliament as a member of the Janata Party.
