= Gopalrao Patil =

Indian politician (1931–2026)

Member of Parliament, Rajya Sabha
- In office April 1994 – April 2000
- Succeeded by: Janardan Waghmare
- Constituency: Maharashtra

Personal details
- Born: 3 October 1931 Latur, Hyderabad State, India
- Died: 21 April 2026 (aged 94) Latur, Maharashtra, India
- Party: Bharatiya Janata Party
- Education: M.B.B.S., D.C.H.
- Alma mater: Osmania university
- Occupation: Politician, businessman

Gopalrao Patil (3 October 1931 – 21 April 2026) was an Indian politician and pediatrician. He belonged to the Bharatiya Janata Party (BJP) and was a member of the Rajya Sabha (Upper House of the Parliament of India). Patil was the president of Shivchhatrapati Shikshan Sanstha, which runs the Rajarshi Shahu College, Latur, Maharashtra.

Patil stood as the BJP candidate for the Latur Lok Sabha seat in the 1998 Indian general election. He again contested the Latur seat in the 1999 Indian general election.

Patil died in Latur on 21 April 2026, at the age of 94.
