= Alexander Warjri =

Indian politician

Member of Parliament, Rajya Sabha
- In office 1978-1984
- Constituency: Meghalaya

Personal details
- Born: 26 March 1929
- Died: 3 November 2010 (aged 81)
- Party: Independent
- Spouse: Judith Kharshing

Alexander Warjri was an Indian politician. He was a Member of Parliament, representing Meghalaya in the Rajya Sabha the upper house of India's Parliament as an independent.
