= Abid Ali Jaferbhai =

Indian politician

Abid Ali Jaferbhai (1899/1900 - 26 June 1973) was a leader of Congress(I) from Bombay, Maharashtra.

He became a member of the Bombay Legislative Council in 1947. He was a founding member of the Indian National Trade Union Congress and its vice-president. As such, he was closely related to the Governing Body of the International Labour Office (ILO). For four terms from 3 April 1952 to 3 April 1970 Abid Ali served as member of the Rajya Sabha. He was Union Deputy Minister for Labour during 1952–1962.

He was born in 1899 or 1900. He died in 1973 and was survived by three sons and one daughter.

He lived in Mazgaon, Bombay.
