= Karad Lok Sabha constituency =

Constituency of the Indian parliament in Maharashtra

Coordinates: 17.3°N 74.2°E

Karad
- Former Lok Sabha constituency

Constituency details
- Country: India
- Region: Western India
- State: Maharashtra
- Established: 1957
- Abolished: 2009
- Reservation: None

Karad was a Lok Sabha parliamentary constituency in Maharashtra from 1957 to 2009. The parts of constituency were delimited to Satara and Sangli Lok Sabha constituencies.It included the Walwa-Islampur and Shirala Vidhan sabha Constituencies which are now a part of sangli lok sabha constituency.

== Members of Parliament ==
Year	Member	Party
1952-57 : Seat did not exist
1957	Anandrao Alias Dajisaheb Chavan	Peasants and Workers Party of India
1962	Anandrao Alias Dajisaheb Chavan	Indian National Congress
1967	Anandrao Alias Dajisaheb Chavan	Indian National Congress
1971	Anandrao Alias Dajisaheb Chavan	Indian National Congress
1973^	Premala Chavan	Indian National Congress
1977	Premala Chavan	Indian National Congress
1980	Yashwantrao Mohite	Indian National Congress
1984	Premala Chavan	Indian National Congress
1989	Premala Chavan	Indian National Congress
1991	Prithviraj Chavan	Indian National Congress
1996	Prithviraj Chavan	Indian National Congress
1998	Prithviraj Chavan	Indian National Congress
1999	Shriniwas Patil	Nationalist Congress Party
2004	Shriniwas Patil	Nationalist Congress Party
2008 onwards : Seat does not exist

^ by-poll

== See also ==
- Karad
- List of constituencies of the Lok Sabha
