= Shankarrao Bobdey =

Indian politician (1915–2007)

Member of Parliament, Rajya Sabha
- In office 1964–1976
- Constituency: Maharashtra

Personal details
- Born: 24 September 1915 Khamgaon, Buldana District, Bombay Presidency, British India
- Died: 8 July 2007 (aged 91)
- Party: Indian National Congress

Shankarrao Bajirao Bobdey (1915-2007) was an Indian politician. He was a Member of Parliament representing Maharashtra in the Rajya Sabha the upper house of India's Parliament as member of the Indian National Congress.
