= Prithviraj Chavan =

17th Chief Minister of Maharashtra from 2010 to 2014

Prithviraj Dajisaheb Chavan
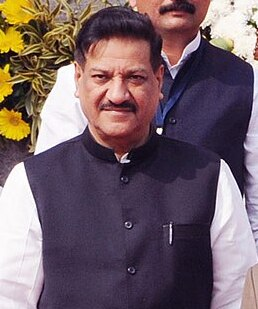
- Chavan in 2011

17th Chief Minister of Maharashtra
- In office 11 November 2010 – 28 September 2014
- Governor: K. Sankaranarayanan
- Preceded by: Ashok Chavan
- Succeeded by: President's rule

Leader of the House in Maharashtra Legislative Assembly
- In office 11 November 2010 – 26 September 2014
- Speaker: Dilip Walse-Patil
- Preceded by: Ashok Chavan
- Succeeded by: Devendra Fadnavis

Minister of State for Prime Minister's Office
- In office 22 May 2004 – 25 September 2010
- President: A. P. J. Abdul Kalam; Pratibha Patil
- Prime Minister: Manmohan Singh
- Ministry: Parliamentary Affairs; Department of Personnel and Training; Department of Pension and Pensioners' Welfare; Department of Administrative Reforms & Public Grievances
- Succeeded by: V. Narayanasamy

Member of Parliament, Rajya Sabha
- In office 13 March 2002 – 07 May 2011
- Constituency: Maharashtra

Member of Parliament, Lok Sabha
- In office 3 May 1991 – 20 June 1999
- Preceded by: Premala Chavan
- Succeeded by: Shriniwas Patil
- Constituency: Karad, Maharashtra

Member of Maharashtra Legislative Assembly
- In office 19 October 2014 – 23 November 2024
- Preceded by: Vilasrao Balkrishna Patil
- Succeeded by: Atulbaba Suresh Bhosale
- Constituency: Karad South

Member of Maharashtra Legislative Council
- In office 07 May 2011 – 19 October 2014
- Chair of Council: Shivajirao Deshmukh
- Preceded by: Sanjay Satishchandra Dutt
- Succeeded by: Subhash Desai
- Constituency: elected by Legislative Assembly members

Personal details
- Born: 17 March 1946 (age 80) Indore, Indore State, British India (present-day Madhya Pradesh, India)
- Party: Indian National Congress
- Spouse: Satvasheela Chavan (Deshmukh) (m. 1976)
- Education: BITS, Pilani (B.E.); University of California, Berkeley (M.S.)

Prithviraj Dajisaheb Chavan (Marathi pronunciation: [prut̪ʱʋiːɾaːd͡ʑ t͡səʋʱaːɳ]; born 17 March 1946) is an Indian politician who was the 17th Chief Minister of Maharashtra from 2010 to 2014. Chavan is a graduate of BITS Pilani and University of California, Berkeley in mechanical engineering. He spent time working in the field of aircraft instrumentation and designing audio recorders for anti-submarine warfare in the US before returning to India and becoming an entrepreneur in 1974. Referred to in the media as a technocrat with a clean, non-controversial image, a low-profile leader. Chavan served as the Minister of State in the Prime Minister's Office in the Ministry of Parliamentary Affairs and Ministry of Personnel, Public Grievances, and Pensions. Chavan was also General Secretary of the All-India Congress Committee (AICC), in-charge of many states, including Jammu and Kashmir, Karnataka, Haryana, Gujarat, Tripura, and Arunachal Pradesh.

Chavan was drawn into politics after meeting with Rajiv Gandhi. He has been involved in the Indian National Congress bureaucracy for most of his adult life, notably as a member of the Rajya Sabha (the upper house of the India's Parliament) and later architect of the Civil Liability for Nuclear Damage Act, 2010. He was first elected to the Lok Sabha in 1991 and followed it up in subsequent elections. Chavan held five portfolios in the United Progressive Alliance (UPA) government that includes the ministry of science and technology. He became chief minister of Maharashtra in 2010 at the insistence of Congress President Sonia Gandhi succeeding unrelated Ashok Chavan. He resigned as the chief minister of Maharashtra after the ruling NCP-Congress alliance split in the state.

He contested the 2024 legislative assembly elections from the Karad South constituency but lost by a huge margin to Dr. Atulbaba Suresh Bhosale of the BJP.

== Early life ==
Chavan was born in a Maratha family in Indore, Central Provinces on 17 March 1946. His parents were Dajisaheb Chavan and Premala. He is the eldest of three siblings. His younger sisters are Nirupama Ajitrao Yadav-Deshmukh and Vidyulata Venkatrao Ghorpade. Dajisaheb was a member of the Lok Sabha from the Karad constituency from 1957 to 1973 & served as a Minister in the cabinets of Prime Ministers Jawaharlal Nehru, Lal Bahadur Shastri and Indira Gandhi. Upon Dajisaheb's death in 1973, Chavan's mother, Premala (affectionately known as Premalakaki, aunt Premala) contested from her late husband's constituency and was elected in the by election in 1973 and in the general elections of 1977, 1984, and 1989 serving till her death in 1991.

Chavan began his schooling at a local Municipal Marathi-medium school in Karad. After his father moved to Delhi, Chavan joined Nutan Marathi School in Delhi. Chavan graduated in Mechanical Engineering from BITS Pilani. After graduation in 1967, he won a UNESCO scholarship in Germany and later moved to pursue a Master of Science degree from the University of California, Berkeley. He wrote articles on computer science; engineering design; and also contributed to research in computerization. He also worked briefly in the US as a design engineer, working on defence electronics, anti-submarine warfare, computer storage systems, and computerisation of Indian languages.

== Political career ==
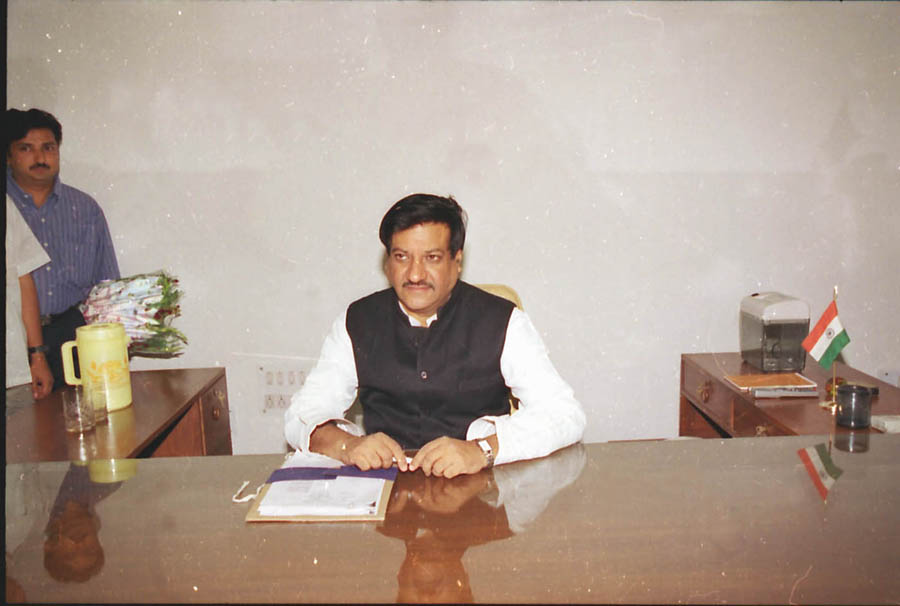
Prithviraj Chavan assumes the charge of Minister of State for PMO in New Delhi on 24 May 2004

Chavan started his political career in 1991 by winning his parents old seat of Karad to the Lok sabha. He went on to win the seat thrice, in 1991, 1996 and 1998 but lost in 1999.

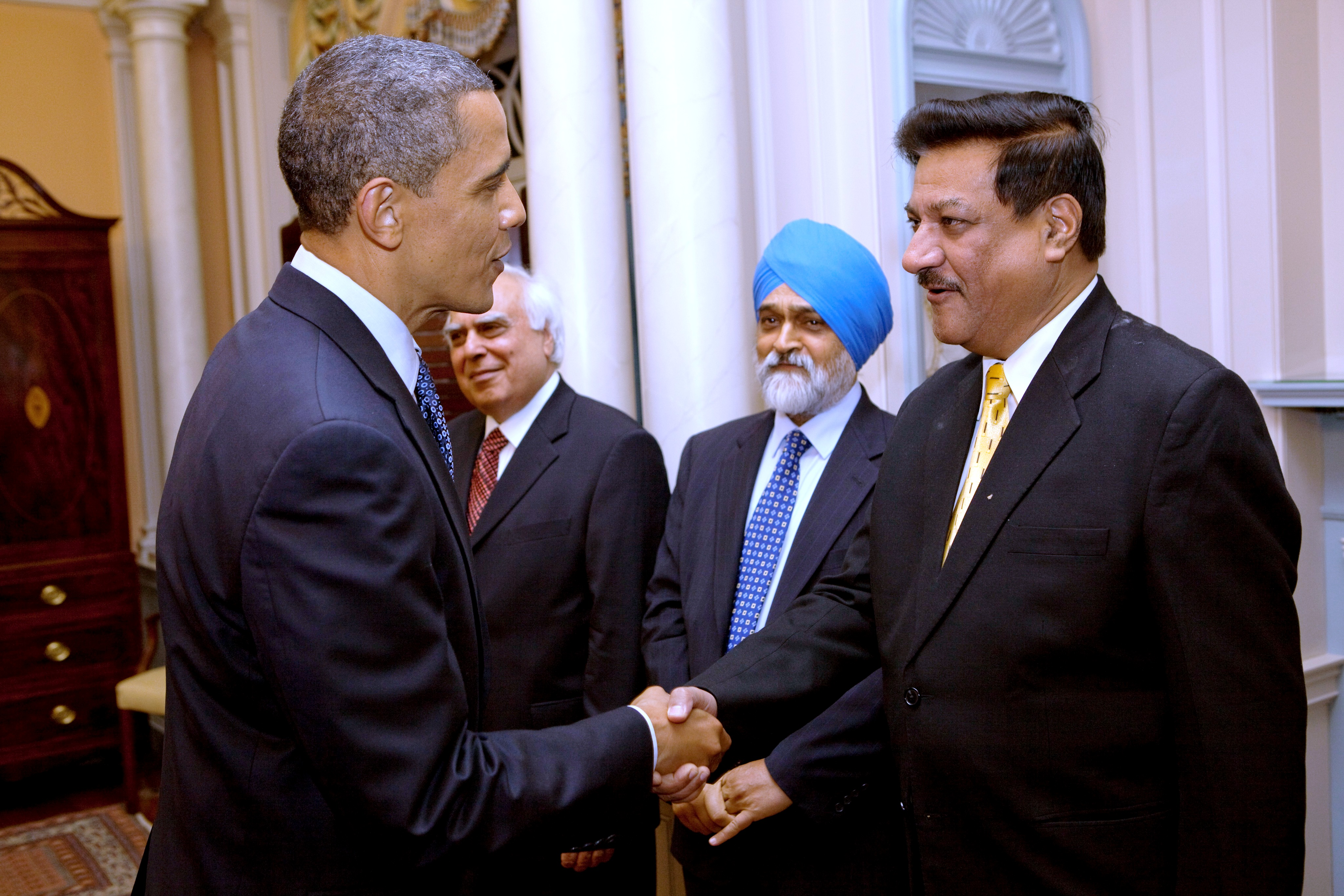
Chavan as 17th Chief Minister of Maharashtra meeting U.S President Barack Obama

He served as a Minister of State for the ministries of Ministry of Science and Technology, Ministry of Earth Sciences, Ministry of Personnel, Public Grievances and Pensions, Ministry of Parliamentary Affairs and in charge of Prime Minister's Office. Earlier he also served as the Minister of State in charge of the Department of Atomic Energy. Chavan replaced Ashok Chavan as chief minister after the latter's involvement in the Adarsh Housing Society scam forced him to resign. Reasons for his choice reported by the media included the perception that he had a "clean image" and that he did not have his own faction of political supporters within the state. He was elected as MLC after Sanjay Satishchandra Dutt vacated his seat.

One of his first actions as Chief Minister was to play a role along with Civil Aviation minister Praful Patel, in convincing Jairam Ramesh, the Minister for Environment and Forests in obtaining environmental clearance for the planned second airport in Mumbai, Navi Mumbai International Airport.

== Personal life ==
Chavan married Satvasheela on 16 December 1976. They have a daughter, Ankita and a son named Jai. Ankita married on 29 November 2013 in Delhi.

== Posts held ==
- 1991-92 Member, Consultative Committee for the Ministry of Science and Technology.
- 1992-93 Member, Committee on Science and Technology, Ministry of Environment and Forests.
- 1994-96 Member, Standing Committee on Finance and Planning.
- 1996-99 Member, Committee on Provision of Computers to Members of Parliament.
- 2000-01 Spokesperson, All India Congress Committee.
- 2002-04 Member, Consultative Committee for the Ministry of Defence.
- 2004-22 May 2009 and 28 May 2009 onward Minister of State in the Prime Minister's Office.
- 11 November 2010 - 28 September 2014 - Chief Minister of Maharashtra
- 19 October 2014 - 26 November 2024 - Member of Legislative Assembly

Preceded by Ashok Chavan	Chief Minister of Maharashtra; 11 Nov 2010 – 26 September 2014	Succeeded by President`s Rule
