= Manilal Chaturbhai Shah =

Indian politician

Member of Parliament, Rajya Sabha
- In office 1952-1960
- Constituency: Bombay State

Personal details
- Party: Indian National Congress

Manilal Chaturbhai Shah was an Indian politician. He was a Member of Parliament representing Bombay State in the Rajya Sabha the upper house of India's Parliament as member of the Indian National Congress.
