= Premala Chavan =

Former Indian politician

Member of Parliament, Lok Sabha
- In office 1973–1980
- Preceded by: Dajisaheb Chavan
- Succeeded by: Yashwantrao Mohite
- Constituency: Karad
- In office 1984–1991
- Preceded by: Yashwantrao Mohite
- Succeeded by: Prithviraj Chavan
- Constituency: Karad

Member of Parliament, Rajya Sabha
- In office 1980–1984
- Constituency: Maharashtra

Women's Cricket Association of India

President
- In office 1973–?

Personal details
- Born: 2 July 1918 Baroda State
- Died: 8 July 2003 (aged 85)
- Party: Indian National Congress
- Spouse: Dajisaheb Chavan (m. 1942)
- Children: Prithviraj, Nirupama, Vidyulata
- Occupation: Politician

Premala Chavan (2 July 1918 – 8 July 2003), also known as Premalabai and Premalakaki, was an Indian politician and was a member of the Lok Sabha and the Rajya Sabha. The Founder-President of the All India Women's Cricket Association, she was involved in various other activities that contributed to the welfare of women in Indian society. Chavan is notable for holding the record for the most number of representations (four) in the Lok Sabha and the Rajya Sabha, by a female M.P. from Maharashtra.

== Personal life ==
Chavan was born to the M. N. Rao Jagdale in the Baroda district of Gujarat. She completed her primary and secondary education at S.N.D.T. in Indore, after which she went to St. Xavier's College Bombay, where she received a Diploma in Montessori Education. Premala married Dajisaheb Chavan on 27 April 1942. She was the mother of the ex-Chief Minister of Maharashtra, Prithviraj Chavan, along with Nirupama Ajitrao Yadav and Vidlyulata Vyankatrao Ghorpade.

== Political career ==
=== Lok Sabha and Rajya Sabha ===
Chavan was a member of the Peasants and Workers Party of Maharashtra from 1952 to 1960. Later, she represented the Indian National Congress party in the Fifth Lok Sabha (1971–77), the Sixth Lok Sabha (1977–79), the Eighth Lok Sabha (1984–89), and the Rajya Sabha (1980–84). After her husband's death, she was elected unopposed to the Lok Sabha in a by-poll in 1973. She was re-elected from the Karad constituency for the next three terms. After the post-emergency split in the Congress, when many party veterans in the state aligned with the congress led by Devraj Urs, Chavan chose to remain with Indira Gandhi and also served as the Congress(i) State President at that time. When Indira Gandhi returned to power in 1980, she nominated Chavan to Rajya Sabha in 1981. Chavan was re-elected to the Lok Sabha from Karad in 1989. Chavan retired from politics in 1991 when Rajiv Gandhi asked her son to continue the family's political legacy in parliament.

Chavan participated in the Lok Sabha until 1991, until which point she had contested from her late constituency and served in the same capacity for all consecutive terms.

=== Committee experience ===
Chavan was a member of the Committee on Subordinate Legislation, the Committee on Official Language, and the Business Advisory Committee from 1985 to 1987; a member of the Rules Committee from 1987 to 1989; a member of the Consultative Committee, the Department of Atomic Energy, Space, Electronics, Ocean Development and the Ministry of Science and Technology in 1990.

== Social activities ==
Chavan was the founder of the Polytechnic Engineering College in Karad and she started the first Montessori School in Karad in 1951. In addition to this, she started the Mahila Mandal Movement in 1950 in Karad. Later, in 1973, she founded the All India Women's Cricket Association.

== Death ==
Chavan died on 8 July 2003. She and her husband both died on 8 July, in different years.
