= A. G. Kulkarni =

Indian politician

A. G. Kulkarni (1 March 1917 - 27 April 1992) was an Indian politician, a member of the Indian National Congress.

== Early life ==
He was born in Maharashtra. He obtained a Bachelor of Science in Chemistry.

== Career ==
He was Member of Rajya Sabha for four terms: April 19, 1967 to April 2, 1970, April 3, 1970, to April 2, 1976, April 3, 1978, to April 2, 1984, and July 5, 1986, to April 27, 1992. During 1978-82 he was vice-chairman of Rajya Sabha.

== Legacy ==
He is survived by Shrimati Malati Kulkarni Doogar, one daughter and four sons.
