= Sadasiv Bagaitkar =

Indian politician

Member of Rajya Sabha
- In office 3 April 1978 – 5 December 1983
- Constituency: Maharashtra

Personal details
- Born: Sadasiv Bagaitkar; 13 November 1923
- Died: 5 December 1983 (aged 60)
- Party: Janata Party
- Other political affiliations: Praja Socialist Party

Sadasiv Bagaitkar (1923–1983) was an Indian politician. He was a Member of Parliament, representing Maharashtra in the Rajya Sabha the upper house of India's Parliament as a member of the Janata Party. He was chairman and Secretary of Praja Socialist Party in Maharashtra from 1957 to 1960.
