= Babubhai Maneklal Chinai =

Indian politician

Member of Parliament, Rajya Sabha
- In office 1958-1975
- Constituency: Maharashtra

Personal details
- Born: 19 April 1913 Ahmedabad, British India
- Party: Independent

Babubhai Maneklal Chinai (1913-1975) was an Indian politician. He was a Member of Parliament representing Maharashtra in the Rajya Sabha the upper house of India's Parliament. He was awarded India's third highest civilian honour the Padma Bhushan in 1966.
