= Sushila Adivarekar =

Indian politician

Sushila Shankar Adivarekar

Member of Parliament (Rajya Sabha)
- In office 1971–1984
- Constituency: Maharashtra

Personal details
- Born: 20 June 1923
- Died: 17 November 2012 (aged 89)
- Party: Indian National Congress
- Spouse: Shankar Adivarekar

Sushila Shankar Adivarekar (née Desai) was an Indian politician. She was a member of the Rajya Sabha, the upper house of the Parliament of India representing Maharashtra as a member of the Indian National Congress.
