= Deokinandan Narayan =

Indian politician

Member of Parliament, Rajya Sabha
- In office 1952–1966
- Constituency: Bombay State

Personal details
- Born: October 1899
- Died: 1985
- Party: Indian National Congress

Deokinandan Narayan was an Indian politician. He was a Member of Parliament representing Maharashtra in the Rajya Sabha the upper house of India's Parliament as member of the Indian National Congress.
