= Vithalrao Jadhav =

Indian politician

Member of Parliament, Rajya Sabha
- In office 1982–1994
- Constituency: Maharashtra

Personal details
- Born: 30 October 1937 (age 88)
- Party: Indian National Congress
- Spouse: Shobha Vithalrao Jadhav

Vithalrao Madhavrao Jadhav (born 30 October 1937) is an Indian politician. He was a Member of Parliament, representing Maharashtra in the Rajya Sabha the upper house of India's Parliament as a member of the Indian National Congress.
