= 2014 Maharashtra Legislative Assembly election =

- 15 October 2014

All 288 seats to the Maharashtra Legislative Assembly 145 seats needed for a majority
- Opinion polls
- Turnout: 63.38% (▲3.70%)
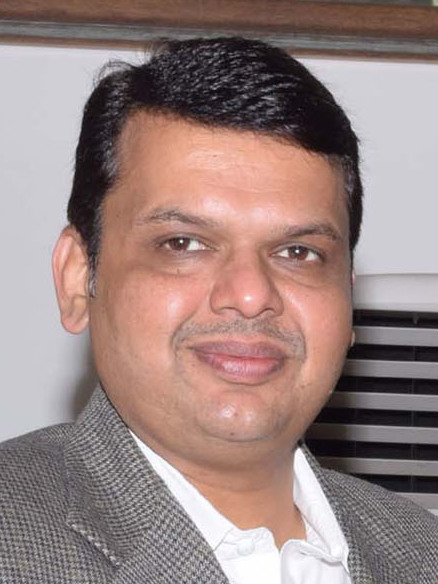

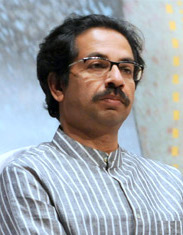

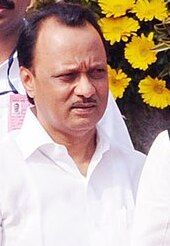
	Majority party	Minority party
Leader	Devendra Fadnavis (Note: The BJP did not announce a CM Face prior to the election. Devendra Fadnavis was chosen as Chief Minister following the election.)	Uddhav Thackeray
Party	BJP	SS
Alliance	NDA	-
Leader's seat	Nagpur South West	Did Not Contest
Last election	46 seats	44 seats
Seats won	122	63
Seat change	▲76	▲19
Popular vote	1,47,09,276	1,02,35,970
Percentage	27.81%	19.35%
Swing	▲13.79 pp	▲3.09 pp
	Third party	Fourth party
Leader	Prithviraj Chavan	Ajit Pawar
Party	INC	NCP
Alliance	UPA	-
Leader's seat	Karad South	Baramati
Last election	82 seats	62 seats
Seats won	42	41
Seat change	▼40	▼21
Popular vote	94,96,095	91,22,285
Percentage	17.95%	17.24%
Swing	▼3.06 pp	▲0.87 pp
- Results of 2014 Maharashtra Vidhan Sabha Elections

- Structure of the Maharashtra Legislative Assembly after the election
Chief Minister before election
Prithviraj Chavan
INC
Elected Chief Minister
Devendra Fadnavis
BJP

The 2014 Maharashtra Legislative Assembly election was held on 15 October 2014 to elect all 288 members of the state's Legislative Assembly. After a 63.38% turnout in the election as hung verdict has occurred with Bharatiya Janata Party (BJP) and Shivsena (SHS) emerged as largest and second largest parties.

== Timeline ==
The term of the Legislative Assembly of Maharashtra was due to expire on 8 November 2014. By virtue of its powers, duties and functions under Article 324 read with Article 172(1) of the Constitution of India and Section 15 of Representation of the People Act, 1951, the Election Commission of India is required to hold elections to constitute the new Legislative Assembly in the State of Maharashtra during a window of time which is: between six months before and six months after the date of expiry. Elections are almost invariably held before the expiry of the term, rather than afterwards.

The Model Code of Conduct comes into effect the day that the election commission announces the schedule of elections. This happened on 12 September 2014. The required Gazette Notification was issued on 20 September 2014. The legislative assembly election was held on 15 October 2014, in a single phase, to select the 288 members of the Maharashtra Legislative Assembly in India. The result was announced on 19 October, with the BJP getting a plurality. The term of the current 13th Legislative Assembly is to end on November 9, 2019, as the first meeting of the new house was held on November 10, 2014.

== Background ==
After the landslide victory of BJP in 2014 Indian general election under the leadership of Narendra Modi, BJP won majority seats in the state and formed government with Shivsena by reviving there grand old alliance. Congress-NCP alliance was not able to attain majority due to decreasing popularity of UPA government.

== Alliances ==
Following the NCP-INC alliance's performance in the 2014 Indian general election, the NCP demanded 144 seats to contest and a rotation of the Chief Minister's post between parties. Both parties held negotiations but failed to reach a conclusion. The INC declared its list of candidates for 118 seats on 25 September without consulting the NCP. Thus, the NCP unilaterally severed its 15-year-old alliance with the INC. The INC later reached out to the Samajwadi Party (SP) to form an alliance.

The Shiv Sena and Bharatiya Janta Party (BJP) were alliance partners for 25-years - including several smaller parties, such as Republican Party of India (Athavale), Swabhimani Shetkari Sanghatna, Rashtriya Samaj Paksha, were also a part. After the general election, the BJP demanded additional seats to contest; initially they requested 144 seats but later reduced their demand to 130 seats. The Shiv Sena offered 119 seats to the BJP and 18 seats to four other allies, keeping 151 to contest itself. After several rounds of negotiations, the parties did not reach a conclusion. Thus the Shiv Sena - BJP alliance ended on the 25 September after 25 years.

=== Parties ===
- National Democratic Alliance
  - Bharatiya Janata Party
  - Republican Party of India (Athavale)
  - Swabhimani Paksha
  - Rashtriya Samaj Paksha
  - Shiv Sangram
- Shiv Sena
- Indian National Congress
- Nationalist Congress Party
- Maharashtra Navnirman Sena
- Peasants and Workers Party of India
- Bahujan Vikas Aaghadi
- Samajwadi Party
- Bahujan Mukti Party
- Bharipa Bahujan Mahasangh
- Bahujan Samaj Party
- All India Majlis-e-Ittehadul Muslimeen
- Communist Party of India (Marxist)
- Jan Surajya Shakti (JSSP)
- Republican Sena

== Parties & Alliances ==
Coalition	Party	Flag	Leader	Seats contested	Coalition seats contested
NDA	Bharatiya Janata Party		Devendra Fadnavis	256	279
NDA	Shiv Sangram	-	-	4	279
NDA	Swabhimani Paksha (Note: It contested on Whistle symbol in 10 constituencies except AC 252 Pandharpur constituency.)		Raju Shetti	11+1 (Note: Friendly contest on AC 220 Shrirampur constituency with BJP.)	279
NDA	Rashtriya Samaj Paksha	-	Mahadev Jankar	4+1 (Note: Friendly Contest on AC 105 Kannad constituency with BJP.)	279
NDA	Republican Party of India (Athawale) (Note: RPI(A) contested on the Slate symbol in AC 57 Nagpur North, the Candle symbol in AC 208 Vadgaon Sheri, the Sewing Machine symbol in AC 206 Pimpri, and the Cup and Saucer symbol in AC 74 Chimur, AC 156 Vikhroli, and AC 173 Chembur.)		Ramdas Athawale	3+3 (Note: Friendly contest on AC 57 Nagpur North, AC 74 Chimur, and AC 206 Pimpri constituencies with BJP.)	279
-	Indian National Congress		Prithviraj Chavan	287	287
-	Shiv Sena		Uddhav Thackeray	282	282
-	Nationalist Congress Party		Ajit Pawar	278	278

== Campaign ==
=== Indian National Congress ===
The incumbent Indian National Congress started its campaign on 1 September at Hutatma Chowk, Mumbai. Prithviraj Chavan, the incumbent Chief Minister led the campaign with Narayan Rane heading the Campaign Committee. The party's advertising campaign began on 20 September.

=== Nationalist Congress Party ===
The Nationalist Congress Party began its campaign in Kolhapur on 16 September with national party President Sharad Pawar, Deputy Chief Minister Ajit Pawar, Maharashtra party President Sunil Tatkare and MP from Kolhapur Dhananjay Mahadik attending the rally.

=== Bharatiya Janata Party ===
Prime Minister Narendra Modi spoke in South Mumbai's Mahalaxmi Racecourse after his return from the U.S. for the sixty-ninth session of the United Nations General Assembly.

=== Shiv Sena ===
Shiv Sena started its campaign at Mahalaxmi Racecourse in Mumbai on 27 September, where party leader Uddhav Thackeray addressed its supporters.

== Election ==
A total of 3255 candidates contested the election.voter turnout was 64%. Voter-verified paper audit trail (VVPAT) along with EVMs was used in 13 constituencies: Wardha, Amravati (2 pockets), Yavatmal, Chandrapur, Nashik (3 pockets), Aurangabad (3 pockets) and Ahmednagar (2 pockets).

List of Political Parties participated in 2014 Maharashtra Assembly Elections.

Party	Abbreviation
National Parties
Bharatiya Janata Party	BJP
Indian National Congress	INC
Nationalist Congress Party	NCP
Communist Party of India (Marxist)	CPM
Communist Party of India	CPI
Bahujan Samaj Party	BSP
State Parties
Shiv Sena	SHS
Maharashtra Navnirman Sena	MNS
Indian Union Muslim League	IUML
All India Majlis-e-Ittehadul Muslimeen	AIMIM
Janata Dal (United)	JD(U)
Janata Dal (Secular)	JD(S)
Rashtriya Lok Dal	RLD
Samajwadi Party	SP
All India Forward Bloc	AIFB
Registered (Unrecognised) Parties
Akhil Bharatiya Hindu Mahasabha	HMS
Akhil Bharatiya Jana Sangh	ABJS
Swatantra Bharat Paksha	STBP
Akhil Bharatiya Sena	ABHS
Hindustan Janata Party	HJP
Rashtravadi Janata Party	RVNP
Swabhimani Paksha	SWP
Socialist Party (India)	SP(I)
Socialist Unity Centre of India (Communist)	SUCI(C)
Peasants and Workers Party	PWP
Bolshevik Party of India	BPI
Communist Party of India (Marxist-Leninist) Liberation	CPI(ML)(L)
Communist Party of India (Marxist-Leninist) Red Star	CPI(ML)(RS)
Republican Party of India	RPI
Republican Party of India (Khobragade)	RPI(K)
Republican Party of India (Athawale)	RPI(A)
Republican Party of India (Kamble)	RPI(KM)
Republican Sena	RPSN
Bharipa Bahujan Mahasangh	BBM
Bahujan Republican Ekta Manch	BREM
Ambedkarite Party of India	APoI
Bahujan Samaj Party (Ambedkar)	BSP(A)
Bahujan Mukti Party	BMUP
Rashtriya Bahujan Congress Party	RBCP
Rashtriya Aam Party	RAaP
Bahujan Vikas Aaghadi	BVA
Jan Surajya Shakti	JSS
Rashtriya Samaj Paksha	RSPS
Bharatiya Minorities Suraksha Mahasangh	BMSM
Democratic Secular Party	DESEP
Peace Party	PECP
Welfare Party of India	WPOI
Majlis Bachao Tahreek	MBT
Rashtriya Ulama Council	RUC
National Loktantrik Party	NLP
Gondwana Ganatantra Party	GGP
Hindusthan Nirman Dal	HND
Awami Vikas Party	AwVP
Kranti Kari Jai Hind Sena	KKJHS
All India Krantikari Congress	AIKC
Prabuddha Republican Party	PRCP
Ambedkar National Congress	ANC
Proutist Bloc India	PBI
Rashtriya Krantikari Samajwadi Party	RKSP
Akhil Bhartiya Manavata Paksha	ABMP
Lok Bharati	LB
Minorities Democratic Party	MNDP
Republican Paksha (Khoripa)	RP(K)
Republican Party of India (Ektawadi)	RPI(E)
Sardar Vallabhbhai Patel Party	SVPP
Akhila Bharatiya Rytha Party	AKBRP
Ambedkarist Republican Party	ARP
Bhartiya Dalit Congress	BDC
Bharatiya Congress Paksha	BhCP
Bhartiya Navjawan Sena (Paksha)	BNS
Chhattisgarh Swabhiman Manch	CSM
Gareeb Aadmi Party	GaAP
Hindu Ekta Andolan Party	HEAP
Hindusthan Praja Paksha	HiPPa
Jai Janseva Party	JJP
Lokshasan Andolan Party	LAP
The Lok Party of India	LPI
Manav Adhikar Raksha Party	MARP
Maharashtra Vikas Aghadi	MVA
National Black Panther Party	NBPP
Navbahujan Samajparivartan Party	NSamP
Panthers Republican Party	PREP
Republican Bahujan Sena	RBS
Rashtriya Balmiki Sena Paksha	RBSP
Rashtriya Kisan Congress Party	RKCGP
Rashtriya Samajwadi Party (Secular)	RSP(S)
Secular Alliance of India	SAOI
Sanman Rajkiya Paksha	SaRaPa
Swarajya Nirman Sena	SNS
Sanatan Sanskriti Raksha Dal	SSRD

== Surveys and polls ==
=== Exit polls ===
Publish Date	Source	Polling Organisation						
Publish Date	Source	Polling Organisation	BJP+	Shivsena	INC	NCP	MNS	Others
15 October 2014		News 24 – Chanakya	151 ± 9	71 ± 9	27 ± 5	28 ± 5	11 ± 5	
15 October 2014		Times Now	129	56	43	36	12	12
15 October 2014		ABP News – Nielsen	127	77	40	34	5	5
15 October 2014		India TV – CVoter	124-134	51-61	38-48	31-41	9-15	9-15

== Results ==
122	63	42	41	7
BJP	SHS	INC	NCP	OTH

=== Detailed Results ===
Party	Leader	MLAs				Votes	
Party	Leader			Of total			Of total
Bharatiya Janata Party	Devendra Fadnavis	122	▲76	260	122 / 288 (42%)	1,47,09,276	27.81%
Shiv Sena	Uddhav Thackeray	63	▲19	282	63 / 288 (22%)	1,02,35,970	19.35%
Indian National Congress	Prithviraj Chavan	42	▼40	287	42 / 288 (15%)	94,96,095	17.95%
Nationalist Congress Party	Ajit Pawar	41	▼21	278	41 / 288 (14%)	91,22,285	17.24%
Peasants and Workers Party of India	Ganpatrao Deshmukh	3	▼1	51	3 / 288 (1%)	5,33,309	1.01%
Bahujan Vikas Aaghadi	Hitendra Thakur	2	▲1	36	3 / 288 (1%)	3,29,457	0.62%
All India Majlis-e-Ittehadul Muslimeen (AIMIM)	Imtiyaz Jaleel	2	▲2	24	2 / 288 (0.7%)	4,89,614	0.93%
Maharashtra Navnirman Sena	Raj Thackeray	1	▼12	219	1 / 288 (0.3%)	16,65,033	3.15%
Bharipa Bahujan Mahasangh	Prakash Ambedkar	1	Steady	70	1 / 288 (0.3%)	4,72,925	0.89%
Rashtriya Samaj Paksha	Mahadev Jankar	1	Steady	6	1 / 288 (0.3%)	2,56,662	0.49%
Communist Party of India (Marxist)	Rajaram Ozare	1	Steady	20	1 / 288 (0.3%)	2,07,933	0.39%
Samajwadi Party	Abu Azmi	1	▼3	22	1 / 288 (0.3%)	92,304	0.17%
Independents	-	7		1699	7 / 288 (2%)	24,93,152	4.71%
		288				5,29,01,326	63.08%

Bharatiya Janata Party	Shiv Sena	Indian National Congress	Nationalist Congress Party
National Democratic Alliance		United Progressive Alliance	
Devendra Fadnavis	Uddhav Thackeray	Prithviraj Chavan	Ajit Pawar
27.81%	19.35%	17.95%	17.24%
122(27.81%)	63(19.35%)	42(17.95%)	41(17.24%)
122 / 288 ▲76	63 / 288 ▲18	42 / 288 ▼40	41 / 288 ▼21

=== Region-wise break up ===
Region	Total seats									Others
Region	Total seats	Bharatiya Janata Party		Shiv Sena		Indian National Congress		Nationalist Congress Party		Others
Region	Total seats	Seats Won		Seats Won		Seats Won		Seats Won		Others
Western Maharashtra	70	24	▲13	13	▲04	10	▼04	19	▼06	4
Vidarbha	62	44	▲26	4	▼04	10	▼14	1	▼04	3
Marathwada	46	15	▲13	11	▲06	9	▼09	8	▼04	3
Thane+Konkan	39	10	▲04	14	▲06	1	▼01	8	Steady	6
Mumbai	36	15	▲10	14	▲06	5	▼12	0	▼03	2
North Maharashtra	35	14	▲10	7	Steady	7	Steady	5	▼04	2
Total	288	122	▲76	63	▲18	42	▼40	41	▼21	20

=== Votes polled by winning candidates ===
Region									Others
Region	Bharatiya Janata Party		Shiv Sena		Indian National Congress		Nationalist Congress Party		Others
Region	Vote Share %		Vote Share %		Vote Share %		Vote Share %		Vote Share %
Western Maharashtra	34.8%	▲19.8%	17.6%	▲0.9%	10.6%	▼13.3	31.9%	▼12.4	4.93%
Vidarbha	72.5%	▲38.2%	7.1%	▼7.6%	14.9%	▼28.6	2.1%	▼5.7	3.3%
Marathwada	41.1%	▲32.1%	20.4%	▲9.7%	20.6%	▼26.4	11.7%	▼21.4	6.02%
Thane+Konkan	27.4%	▲14.5%	32.5%	▲3.9%	2.91%	▼9.71	19.7%	▼18.1	17.6%
Mumbai	51.3%	▲34.8%	33.6%	▲20.1%	11.8%	▼48.8	00.00%	▼9.2	3.1%
North Maharashtra	42.7%	▲20.8%	19.6%	▲5.9%	19.1%	▼1.7	13.6%	▼29.8	4.9%
Avg.Vote Share	44.97%	▲26.7%	21.80%	▲4.18%	13.32%	▼21.36	13.17%	▼16.10	39.85%

=== City Wise Results ===
City Name	Seats	BJP		SHS		INC		NCP		Oth	
Mumbai	35	15	▲10	14	▲10	5	▼12	0	▼3	1	▼6
Pune	8	8	▲6	0	▼2	0	▼02	0	▼1	0	Steady
Nagpur	6	6	▲2	0	Steady	0	▼02	0	Steady	0	Steady
Thane	5	2	▲2	2	▲1	00	Steady	1	▼01	0	Steady
Pimpri-Chinchwad	6	2	▲01	2	▲01	01	Steady	0	▼01	1	▼1
Nashik	8	3	▲3	3	Steady	01	▼01	1	▲01	0	Steady
Kalyan-Dombivli	6	3	▲01	01	Steady	00	Steady	1	Steady	1	▼1
Vasai-Virar City MC	2	00	Steady	0	Steady	00	Steady	0	Steady	2	Steady
Aurangabad	3	01	▲01	1	▼1	00	▼01	00	Steady	1	▲1
Navi Mumbai	2	1	▲1	0	Steady	0	Steady	01	▼01	00	Steady
Solapur	3	2	▲1	0	Steady	02	Steady	00	Steady	0	Steady
Mira-Bhayandar	1	1	▲1	00	Steady	00	Steady	00	▼1	0	Steady
Bhiwandi-Nizampur MC	3	1	▲1	1	Steady	0	Steady	01	▲1	0	▼2
Jalgaon City	5	2	▲1	1	▼1	0	Steady	01	Steady	1	Steady
Amravati	1	1	▲1	00	Steady	0	▼1	00	Steady	00	Steady
Nanded	3	0	Steady	01	▲01	2	▼1	00	Steady	00	Steady
Kolhapur	6	00	Steady	3	▲1	0	▼1	2	Steady	1	▲01
Ulhasnagar	1	00	▼01	0	Steady	0	Steady	1	▲01	00	Steady
Sangli-Miraj-Kupwad	2	2	Steady	00	Steady	0	Steady	00	Steady	00	Steady
Malegaon	2	00	Steady	01	Steady	1	▲01	00	Steady	00	Steady
Akola	2	2	▲01	0	Steady	00	Steady	00	Steady	00	Steady
Latur	1	00	Steady	00	Steady	1	Steady	00	Steady	00	Steady
Dhule	01	1	▲01	00	Steady	0	▼01	00	Steady	00	Steady
Ahmednagar	1	00	Steady	00	▼01	00	Steady	01	▲01	00	Steady
Chandrapur	3	03	Steady	00	Steady	00	Steady	00	Steady	00	Steady
Parbhani	3	00	Steady	1	▼01	00	Steady	1	▲1	01	Steady
Ichalkaranji	4	01	Steady	2	▲01	00	▼01	00	Steady	00	▼01
Jalna	03	01	▲01	1	▲1	00	▼01	01	Steady	00	▼01
Ambarnath	02	00	Steady	01	Steady	00	Steady	01	Steady	00	Steady
Bhusawal	02	2	▲2	00	Steady	00	Steady	00	▼1	00	▼01
Panvel	02	1	▲01	00	Steady	00	▼01	01	Steady	00	Steady
Beed	05	4	▲03	00	Steady	00	Steady	01	▼4	00	Steady
Gondia	02	01	Steady	00	Steady	01	Steady	00	Steady	00	Steady
Satara	07	00	Steady	01	▲01	02	▲01	04	Steady	00	Steady
Solapur	03	02	▲01	00	Steady	01	▼01	00	Steady	00	Steady
Barshi	1	00	Steady	00	Steady	00	Steady	01	▲01	00	▼01
Yavatmal	3	2	▲02	01	Steady	00	▼02	00	Steady	00	Steady
Achalpur	1	00	Steady	00	Steady	00	Steady	00	Steady	01	Steady
Osmanabad	3	00	Steady	01	▼01	01	Steady	01	▲01	00	Steady
Nandurbar	4	2	▲02	00	Steady	02	Steady	00	▼01	00	▼01
Wardha	1	1	▲01	00	Steady	00	Steady	00	Steady	00	▼01
Udgir	1	01	Steady	00	Steady	00	Steady	00	Steady	00	Steady
Hinganghat	1	01	▲01	00	▼01	00	Steady	00	Steady	00	Steady
Total	109	50	▲31	30	▲9	12	▼28	9	▼5	8	▼7

Type	Seats	BJP		SHS		INC		NCP		OTH
GEN	235	97	▲61	51	▲18	35	▼29	34	▼18	18
SC	28	14	▲8	9	Steady	2	▼4	03	▼03	03
ST	25	11	▲7	3	▲1	05	▼07	04	Steady	02
Total	288	122	▲76	63	▲19	42	▼40	41	▼21	23

Alliance	Party	Western Maharashtra		Vidarbha		Marathwada		Thane+Konkan		Mumbai		North Maharashtra	
National Democratic Alliance	Bharatiya Janata Party	24 / 70 (34%)	▲15	44 / 62 (71%)	▲23	15 / 46 (33%)	▲9	10 / 39 (26%)	▲6	15 / 36 (42%)	▲10	14 / 35 (40%)	▲13
National Democratic Alliance	Shiv Sena	13 / 70 (19%)	▲3	4 / 62 (6%)	Steady	11 / 46 (24%)	▲8	14 / 39 (36%)	▼01	14 / 36 (39%)	▲3	7 / 35 (20%)	▲5
United Progressive Alliance	Indian National Congress	10 / 70 (14%)	▼5	10 / 62 (16%)	▼02	9 / 46 (20%)	▼08	1 / 39 (3%)	▼04	5 / 36 (14%)	▼01	7 / 35 (20%)	▼20
United Progressive Alliance	Nationalist Congress Party	19 / 70 (27%)	▼6	1 / 62 (2%)	▼11	8 / 46 (17%)	▼5	8 / 39 (21%)	▲2	0 / 36 (0%)	▼03	5 / 35 (14%)	▲1
Others	Others	4 / 70 (6%)	▼7	3 / 70 (4%)	▼11	3 / 46 (7%)	▼4	6 / 39 (15%)	▲3	2 / 36 (6%)	▼9	2 / 35 (6%)	▲1

Vidhan Sabha Results
1. Bharatiya Janata Party (27.8%)
2. Shiv Sena (19.4%)
3. Indian National Congress (17.9%)
4. Nationalist Congress Party (17.2%)
5. Others/Independents (17.6%)

Alliance-wise Composition (Post-Poll)
Region	Total Seats	National Democratic Alliance		United Progressive Alliance		Others	
Western Maharashtra	70	▲17	37 / 70 (53%)	▼10	29 / 70 (41%)	▼7	4 / 70 (6%)
Vidarbha	62	▲22	48 / 62 (77%)	▼18	11 / 62 (18%)	▼11	3 / 70 (4%)
Marathwada	46	▲19	26 / 46 (57%)	▼13	17 / 46 (37%)	▼4	3 / 46 (7%)
Thane +Konkan	39	▲10	24 / 39 (62%)	▼01	9 / 39 (23%)	▲3	6 / 39 (15%)
Mumbai	36	▲16	29 / 36 (81%)	▼15	5 / 36 (14%)	▼9	2 / 36 (6%)
North Maharashtra	35	▲10	21 / 35 (60%)	▼04	12 / 35 (34%)	▲1	2 / 35 (6%)
Total		▲94	185 / 288 (64%)	▼61	83 / 288 (29%)	▼13	20 / 288 (7%)

=== Seat Metrics ===
Party	Seats Before	Retained	Gained	Lost	Seats Won
BJP	46	40	▲82	▼06	122
Shiv Sena	45	21	▲41	▼23	63
INC	82	31	▲11	▼51	42
NCP	62	27	▲14	▼35	41

=== Division-wise results ===
Division Name	Seats	BJP		SHS		INC		NCP		Others
Amravati division	30	18	▲13	03	▼2	5	▼07	01	▼02	3
Aurangabad division	46	15	▲13	11	▲4	9	▼9	08	▼3	03
Konkan division	75	25	▲16	28	▲15	6	▼13	08	▼3	08
Nagpur division	32	26	▲13	1	▼2	5	▼7	00	▼02	00
Nashik division	47	19	▲14	8	Steady	10	▼3	08	▼05	02
Pune division	58	19	▲10	12	▲6	07	▼04	16	▼05	04
Total Seats	288	122	▲76	63	▲18	42	▼40	41	▼21	20

=== District-wise results ===
Name of Division	District	Seats	BJP			Shiv Sena			INC			NCP			Others
Name of Division	District	Seats	Votes	Seats Won		Votes	Seats Won		Votes	Seats Won		Votes	Seats Won		
Amravati Division	Akola	5	2,44,924	4	▲2	-	0	▼1	-	0	Steady	-	0	Steady	1
Amravati Division	Amravati	8	2,76,870	4	▲4	-	0	▼1	1,29,687	2	▼2	-	0	Steady	2
Amravati Division	Buldhana	7	1,35,707	3	▲1	1,44,559	2	Steady	1,08,566	2	Steady	-	0	▼1	0
Amravati Division	Yavatmal	7	3,76,648	5	▲5	1,21,216	1	Steady	-	0	▼5	94,152	1	Steady	0
Amravati Division	Washim	3	92,947	2	▲1	-	0	Steady	70,939	1	Steady	-	0	▼1	0
Total Seats		30	11,27,096	18	▲13	2,65,775	3	▼2	3,09,192	5	▼7	94,152	1	▼2	3
Aurangabad Division	Aurangabad	9	1,93,305	3	▲3	190815	3	▲1	96,038	1	▼2	53,114	1	Steady	1
Aurangabad Division	Beed	6	5,73,534	5	▲4	-	0	Steady	-	0	Steady	77,134	1	▼4	0
Aurangabad Division	Jalna	5	1,90,094	3	▲3	45,078	1	Steady	-	0	▼1	98,030	1	▼1	0
Aurangabad Division	Osmanabad	4	-	0	Steady	65,178	1	▼1	70,701	1	Steady	1,67,017	2	▲1	0
Aurangabad Division	Nanded	9	1,18,781	1	▲1	2,83,643	4	▲4	2,12,157	3	▼3	60,127	1	▼1	0
Aurangabad Division	Latur	6	1,43,503	2	▲1	-	0	Steady	2,20,553	3	▼1	-	0	Steady	1
Aurangabad Division	Parbhani	4	-	0	Steady	71,584	1	▼1	-	0	▼4	1,65,327	2	▲2	1
Aurangabad Division	Hingoli	3	97,045	1	▲1	63,851	1	▲1	67,104	1	▼1	-	0	Steady	0
Total Seats		46	13,16,262	15	▲13	7,20,149	11	▲4	6,66,553	9	▼9	6,20,749	8	▼3	3
Konkan Division	Mumbai City	10	1,91,295	3	▲2	1,79,378	3	▲3	1,25,446	3	▼3	-	0	▼1	1
Konkan Division	Mumbai Suburban	26	9,16,127	12	▲8	5,46,689	11	▲7	1,29,715	2	▼9	-	0	▼2	1
Konkan Division	Thane	18	4,83,954	7	▲3	3,90,620	6	▲1	0	0	▼1	2,63,550	4	▼2	1
Konkan Division	Palghar	6	85,050	2	▲2	46,142	1	▲1	0	0	▼1	-	0	Steady	3
Konkan Division	Raigad	7	1,25,142	1	▲1	1,50,539	2	▲1	0	0	▼1	1,18,051	2	Steady	2
Konkan Division	Ratnagiri	5	-	0	Steady	2,45,837	3	Steady	0	0	▼1	1,25,432	2	▲2	0
Konkan Division	Sindhudurg	3	-	0	Steady	1,41,484	2	▲2	74,715	1	Steady	-	0	Steady	0
Total Seats		75	18,01,568	25	▲16	17,00,689	28	▲15	3,29,876	6	▼13	5,07,033	8	▼3	8
Nagpur Division	Bhandara	3	2,38,262	3	▲1	-	-	▼1	-	0	▼1	-	0	▼1	0
Nagpur Division	Chandrapur	6	3,38,801	4	▲1	53,877	1	▲1	70,373	1	▼5	-	0	Steady	0
Nagpur Division	Gadchiroli	3	1,87,016	3	▲3	-	-	Steady	-	0	▼2	-	0	Steady	0
Nagpur Division	Gondia	4	1,81,151	3	▲1	-	-	Steady	62,701	1	▼1	-	0	Steady	0
Nagpur Division	Nagpur	12	9,70,186	11	▲4	-	-	▼1	84,630	1	▼2	-	0	▼1	0
Nagpur Division	Wardha	4	1,36,172	2	▲1	-	-	▼1	1,38,419	2	▼2	-	0	Steady	0
Total Seats		32	20,51,588	26	▲13	53,877	1	▼2	3,56,123	5	▼7	0	0	▼2	0
Nashik Division	Dhule	5	1,50,574	2	▲1	2,91,968	0	▼1	0	3	▲1	0	0	Steady	0
Nashik Division	Jalgaon	11	6,02,017	6	▲4	2,25,716	3	▲1	0	0	Steady	55,656	1	▼4	1
Nashik Division	Nandurbar	4	1,59,884	2	▲2	0	0	Steady	1,58,206	2	Steady	0	0	▼1	0
Nashik Division	Nashik	15	2,62,924	4	▲3	3,14,061	4	Steady	1,24,454	2	▼1	3,18,768	4	▲1	1
Nashik Division	Ahmednagar	12	4,94,530	5	▲3	73,263	1	▲2	2,82,141	3	Steady	2,16,355	3	▼1	0
Total Seats		47	16,69,929	19	▲14	9,05,008	8	Steady	5,64,801	10	▼3	5,90,779	8	▼5	2
Pune Division	Kolhapur	10	1,99,703	2	▲1	5,44,817	6	▲3	0	0	▼2	175,225	2	▼1	0
Pune Division	Pune	21	9,54,022	11	▲8	2,36,642	3	Steady	78,602	1	▼3	379,223	3	▼4	3
Pune Division	Sangli	8	3,32,540	4	▲4	72,849	1	▲1	1,12,523	1	▼1	221,355	2	Steady	0
Pune Division	Satara	8	0	0	Steady	1,04,419	1	▲1	1,52,539	2	▲1	465,629	5	Steady	0
Pune Division	Solapur	11	1,56,954	2	Steady	60,674	1	▲1	2,36,103	3	▲1	334,757	4	Steady	1
Total Seats		58	1,643,219	19	▲10	1,019,401	12	▲6	579,767	7	▼4	1,576,189	16	▼5	4
Total Seats		288	96,08,662	122	▲76	46,64,899	63	▲18	2,806,312	42	▼40	3,388,902	41	▼21	20

=== Results by constituency ===
District	Constituency		Winner				Runner Up				Margin	%
District	#	Name	Candidate	Party	Votes	%	Candidate	Party	Votes	%	Margin	%
Nandurbar	1	Akkalkuwa (ST)	K. C. Padvi	INC	64,410	36.79	Paradake Vijaysing	NCP	48,635	27.78	15,775	9.01
Nandurbar	2	Shahada (ST)	Udesingh Kocharu Padvi	BJP	58,556	31.38	Padmakar Vijaysing	INC	57,837	30.99	719	0.39
Nandurbar	3	Nandurbar (ST)	Vijaykumar Gavit	BJP	1,01,328	52.33	Vasave Kunal	INC	74,210	38.33	27,118	14.00
Nandurbar	4	Nawapur (ST)	Surupsingh Hirya Naik	INC	93,796	47.41	Gavit Sharad	NCP	71,979	36.39	21,817	11.02
Dhule	5	Sakri (ST)	Dhanaji Ahire	INC	74,760	38.95	Manjula Gavit	BJP	71,437	37.22	3,323	1.73
Dhule	6	Dhule Rural	Kunal Rohidas Patil	INC	1,19,094	50.81	Bhadane Manohar	BJP	73,012	31.15	46,082	19.66
Dhule	7	Dhule City	Anil Anna Gote	BJP	57,780	37.14	Kadambande Raghujirao	NCP	44,852	28.83	12,928	8.31
Dhule	8	Sindkheda	Jayakumar Rawal	BJP	92,794	46.66	Bedse Sandeep	NCP	50,636	25.46	42,158	21.20
Dhule	9	Shirpur (ST)	Kashiram Pawara	INC	98,114	49.99	Dr. Jitendra	BJP	72,913	37.15	25,201	12.84
Jalgaon	10	Chopda (ST)	Chandrakant Sonawane	SS	54,176	28.86	Madhuri Patil	NCP	42,241	22.50	11,935	6.36
Jalgaon	11	Raver	Haribhau Jawale	BJP	65,962	35.89	Shirish Chaudhari	INC	55,962	30.45	10,000	5.44
Jalgaon	12	Bhusawal (SC)	Sanjay Waman Sawakare	BJP	87,818	56.15	Zalte Rajesh	NCP	53,181	34.00	34,637	22.15
Jalgaon	13	Jalgaon City	Suresh Damu Bhole	BJP	88,363	47.12	Suresh Jain	SS	46,049	24.55	42,314	22.57
Jalgaon	14	Jalgaon Rural	Gulab Raghunath Patil	SS	84,020	44.28	Gulabrao Deokar	NCP	52,653	27.75	31,367	16.53
Jalgaon	15	Amalner	Shirish Hiralal Chaudhari	IND	68,149	40.12	Anil Bhaidas Patil	BJP	46,910	27.61	21,239	12.51
Jalgaon	16	Erandol	Satish Bhaskarrao Patil	NCP	55,656	32.85	Chimanrao Patil	SS	53,673	31.68	1,983	1.17
Jalgaon	17	Chalisgaon	Unmesh Patil	BJP	94,754	45.15	Rajivdada Deshmukh	NCP	72,374	34.49	22,380	10.66
Jalgaon	18	Pachora	Kishor Appa Patil	SS	87,520	46.15	Dilip Wagh	NCP	59,117	31.17	28,403	14.98
Jalgaon	19	Jamner	Girish Mahajan	BJP	1,03,498	53.20	Patil Digambar	NCP	67,730	34.81	35,768	18.39
Jalgaon	20	Muktainagar	Eknath Khadse	BJP	85,657	46.67	Chandrakant Nimba Patil	SS	75,949	41.38	9,708	5.29
Buldhana	21	Malkapur	Chainsukh Madanlal Sancheti	BJP	75,965	45.10	Dr. Arvind	INC	49,019	29.10	26,946	16.00
Buldhana	22	Buldhana	Harshwardhan Sapkal	INC	46,985	28.66	Sanjay Gaikwad	MNS	35,324	21.55	11,661	7.11
Buldhana	23	Chikhli	Rahul Bondre	INC	61,581	33.85	Khabutare Wamanaappa	BJP	47,520	26.12	14,061	7.73
Buldhana	24	Sindkhed Raja	Shashikant Narsingrao Khedekar	SS	64,203	34.88	Dr. Ganesh	BJP	45,349	24.64	18,854	10.24
Buldhana	25	Mehkar (SC)	Sanjay Raimulkar	SS	80,356	47.84	Laxmanrao Januji	INC	44,421	26.44	35,935	21.40
Buldhana	26	Khamgaon	Akash Pandurang Fundkar	BJP	71,819	36.49	Dilip Sananda	INC	64,758	32.90	7,061	3.59
Buldhana	27	Jalgaon (Jamod)	Sanjay Kute	BJP	63,888	33.42	Tayade Presenjit	BBM	59,193	30.96	4,695	2.46
Akola	28	Akot	Prakash Gunvantrao Bharsakale	BJP	70,086	42.30	Gangane Mahesh	INC	38,675	23.34	31,411	18.96
Akola	29	Balapur	Baliram Sirskar	BBM	41,426	24.56	Syed Natiquddin	INC	34,487	20.45	6,939	4.11
Akola	30	Akola West	Govardhan Mangilal Sharma	BJP	66,934	46.77	Deshmukh Vijay	NCP	26,981	18.85	39,953	27.92
Akola	31	Akola East	Randhir Pralhadrao Sawarkar	BJP	53,678	31.84	Bhade Haridas	BBM	51,238	30.39	2,440	1.45
Akola	32	Murtizapur (SC)	Harish Pimple	BJP	54,226	34.64	Rahul Shesharao	BBM	41,338	26.40	12,888	8.24
Washim	33	Risod	Amit Subhashrao Zanak	INC	70,939	38.40	Jadhav Vijay	BJP	54,131	29.31	16,808	9.09
Washim	34	Washim (SC)	Lakhan Malik	BJP	48,196	25.80	Shashikant Pendharkar	SS	43,803	23.45	4,393	2.35
Washim	35	Karanja	Rajendra Patni	BJP	44,751	24.41	Punjani Mo.	BBM	40,604	22.14	4,147	2.27
Amravati	36	Dhamangaon Railway	Virendra Jagtap	INC	70,879	35.60	Arun Adsad	BJP	69,905	35.11	974	0.49
Amravati	37	Badnera	Ravi Rana	IND	46,827	26.10	Band Sanjay	SS	39,408	21.97	7,419	4.13
Amravati	38	Amravati	Sunil Deshmukh	BJP	84,033	52.10	Rajendra Singh Shekhawat	INC	48,961	30.35	35,072	21.75
Amravati	39	Teosa	Yashomati Chandrakant Thakur	INC	58,808	34.53	Nivedita Choudhari	BJP	38,367	22.53	20,441	12.00
Amravati	40	Daryapur (SC)	Ramesh Ganpatrao Bundile	BJP	64,224	35.15	Balwant Wankhade	RPI	44,642	24.43	19,582	10.72
Amravati	41	Melghat (ST)	Prabhudas Babulal Bhilawekar	BJP	57,002	32.44	Rajkumar Dayaram Patel	NCP	55,023	31.32	1,979	1.12
Amravati	42	Achalpur	Bachchu Kadu	IND	59,234	33.02	Ashok Shridharpant	BJP	49,064	27.35	10,170	5.67
Amravati	43	Morshi	Anil Bonde	BJP	71,611	38.80	Harshvardhan Deshmukh	NCP	31,449	17.04	40,162	21.76
Wardha	44	Arvi	Amar Sharadrao Kale	INC	75,886	44.59	Dadarao Keche	BJP	72,743	42.74	3,143	1.85
Wardha	45	Deoli	Ranjit Kamble	INC	62,533	37.07	Suresh Ganapat Wagmare	BJP	61,590	36.51	943	0.56
Wardha	46	Hinganghat	Samir Trimbakrao Kunawar	BJP	90,275	48.05	Telang Pralay	BSP	25,100	13.36	65,175	34.69
Wardha	47	Wardha	Pankaj Rajesh Bhoyar	BJP	45,897	27.70	Shekar Pramod	INC	37,347	22.54	8,550	5.16
Nagpur	48	Katol	Ashish Deshmukh	BJP	70,344	39.66	Anil Deshmukh	NCP	64,787	36.53	5,557	3.13
Nagpur	49	Savner	Sunil Chhatrapal Kedar	INC	84,630	45.33	Vinod Jivtode	SS	75,421	40.39	9,209	4.94
Nagpur	50	Hingna	Sameer Meghe	BJP	84,139	41.99	Bang Gopikisan	NCP	60,981	30.44	23,158	11.55
Nagpur	51	Umred (SC)	Sudhir Laxmanrao Parwe	BJP	92,399	49.26	Bansod Mokasrao	BSP	34,077	18.17	58,322	31.09
Nagpur	52	Nagpur South West	Devendra Fadnavis	BJP	1,13,918	59.21	Prafulla Gudadhe	INC	54,976	28.57	58,942	30.64
Nagpur	53	Nagpur South	Sudhakar Kohale	BJP	81,224	44.32	Satish Chaturvedi	INC	38,010	20.74	43,214	23.58
Nagpur	54	Nagpur East	Krishna Khopde	BJP	99,136	53.73	Abhijit Wanjarri	INC	50,522	27.38	48,614	26.35
Nagpur	55	Nagpur Central	Vikas Kumbhare	BJP	87,523	54.39	Anees Ahmed	INC	49,452	30.73	38,071	23.66
Nagpur	56	Nagpur West	Sudhakar Deshmukh	BJP	86,500	49.74	Vikas Thakre	INC	60,098	34.56	26,402	15.18
Nagpur	57	Nagpur North (SC)	Milind Mane	BJP	68,905	37.93	Kishore Uttamrao	BSP	55,187	30.37	13,718	7.56
Nagpur	58	Kamthi	Chandrashekhar Bawankule	BJP	1,26,755	53.95	Rajendra Mulak	INC	86,753	36.93	40,002	17.02
Nagpur	59	Ramtek	Dwaram Mallikarjun Reddy	BJP	59,343	34.90	Ashish Jaiswal	SS	47,262	27.80	12,081	7.10
Bhandara	60	Tumsar	Charan Waghmare	BJP	73,952	36.54	Madhukar Kukde	NCP	45,273	22.37	28,679	14.17
Bhandara	61	Bhandara (SC)	Ramchandra Punaji Avsare	BJP	83,408	35.66	Gadhave Dewangana	BSP	46,576	19.91	36,832	15.75
Bhandara	62	Sakoli	Rajesh Lahanu Kashiwar	BJP	80,902	36.95	Sevakbhau Waghaye	INC	55,413	25.31	25,489	11.64
Gondiya	63	Arjuni-Morgaon (SC)	Rajkumar Badole	BJP	64,401	37.59	Nandagawali Rajesh	INC	34,106	19.91	30,295	17.68
Gondiya	64	Tirora	Vijay Bharatlal Rahangdale	BJP	54,160	32.21	Bansod Dilip	IND	41,062	24.42	13,098	7.79
Gondiya	65	Gondiya	Gopaldas Shankarlal Agrawal	INC	62,701	32.03	Agrawal Vinodkumar	BJP	51,943	26.53	10,758	5.50
Gondiya	66	Amgaon (ST)	Sanjay Hanmantrao Puram	BJP	62,590	35.53	Ramrtanbapu Raut	INC	44,295	25.14	18,295	10.39
Gadchiroli	67	Armori (ST)	Krishna Damaji Gajbe	BJP	60,413	34.95	Anandrao Gedam	INC	47,680	27.58	12,733	7.37
Gadchiroli	68	Gadchiroli (ST)	Deorao Madguji Holi	BJP	70,185	43.27	Atram Dharmraobaba	NCP	18,280	11.27	51,905	32.00
Gadchiroli	69	Aheri (ST)	Ambrishrao Satyavanrao Atram	BJP	56,418	37.30	Dharamrao Baba Atram	NCP	36,560	24.17	19,858	13.13
Chandrapur	70	Rajura	Sanjay Yadaorao Dhote	BJP	66,223	31.44	Subhash Dhote	INC	63,945	30.36	2,278	1.08
Chandrapur	71	Chandrapur	Nanaji Sitaram Shamkule	BJP	81,483	41.81	Kishor Jorgewar	SS	50,711	26.02	30,772	15.79
Chandrapur	72	Ballarpur	Sudhir Mungantiwar	BJP	1,03,718	53.03	Mulchandani Khushimal	INC	60,118	30.74	43,600	22.29
Chandrapur	73	Brahmapuri	Vijay Wadettiwar	INC	70,373	36.67	Atul Devidas	BJP	56,763	29.58	13,610	7.09
Chandrapur	74	Chimur	Bunty Bhangdiya	BJP	87,377	44.69	Dr. Avinash	INC	62,222	31.83	25,155	12.86
Chandrapur	75	Warora	Suresh Dhanorkar	SS	53,877	29.52	Sanjay Wamanrao	BJP	51,873	28.42	2,004	1.10
Yavatmal	76	Wani	Sanjivreddy Bapurao Bodkurwar	BJP	45,178	23.03	Nandekar Vishvas	SS	39,572	20.17	5,606	2.86
Yavatmal	77	Ralegaon (ST)	Ashok Uike	BJP	1,00,618	55.26	Vasant Purke	INC	61,868	33.98	38,750	21.28
Yavatmal	78	Yavatmal	Madan Yerawar	BJP	53,671	26.44	Santosh Marotrao	SS	52,444	25.84	1,227	0.60
Yavatmal	79	Digras	Sanjay Rathod	SS	1,21,216	60.10	Vasant Ghuikhedkar	NCP	41,352	20.50	79,864	39.60
Yavatmal	80	Arni (ST)	Raju Narayan Todsam	BJP	86,991	43.63	Shivajirao Moghe	INC	66,270	33.24	20,721	10.39
Yavatmal	81	Pusad	Manohar Naik	NCP	94,152	54.41	Deosarkar Prakashrao	SS	28,793	16.64	65,359	37.77
Yavatmal	82	Umarkhed (SC)	Rajendra Najardhane	BJP	90,190	48.10	Khadse Vijayrao	INC	41,614	22.19	48,576	25.91
Nanded	83	Kinwat	Jadhav Pradeep	NCP	60,127	34.55	Bhimrao Ramji	IND	55,152	31.70	4,975	2.85
Nanded	84	Hadgaon	Nagesh Bapurao Ashtikar	SS	78,520	41.91	Jawalgaonkar Patil	INC	65,079	34.74	13,441	7.17
Nanded	85	Bhokar	Ameeta Ashokrao Chavan	INC	1,00,781	54.43	Madhavrao Bhujangrao Kinhalkar	BJP	53,224	28.75	47,557	25.68
Nanded	86	Nanded North	D. P. Sawant	INC	40,356	22.69	Pandhare Sudhakar	BJP	32,754	18.42	7,602	4.27
Nanded	87	Nanded South	Hemant Patil	SS	45,836	26.31	Dilip Venkatrao	BJP	42,629	24.47	3,207	1.84
Nanded	88	Loha	Prataprao Patil Chikhalikar	SS	92,435	46.97	Dhondge Mukteshwar	BJP	46,949	23.86	45,486	23.11
Nanded	89	Naigaon	Vasantrao Balwantrao Chavan	INC	71,020	35.82	Rajesh Sambhaji Pawar	BJP	60,595	30.56	10,425	5.26
Nanded	90	Deglur (SC)	Subhash Piraji Sabne	SS	66,852	39.21	Raosaheb Antapurkar	INC	58,204	34.14	8,648	5.07
Nanded	91	Mukhed	Govind Mukkaji Rathod	BJP	1,18,781	66.93	Hanmantrao Venkatrao	INC	45,490	25.63	73,291	41.30
Hingoli	92	Basmath	Jaiprakash Shankarlal Mundada	SS	63,851	31.82	Jaiprakash Dandegaonkar	NCP	58,295	29.05	5,556	2.77
Hingoli	93	Kalamnuri	Santosh Kautika Tarfe	INC	67,104	34.59	Gajanan Vitthalrao	SS	56,568	29.16	10,536	5.43
Hingoli	94	Hingoli	Tanaji Sakharamji Mutkule	BJP	97,045	50.94	Patil Bhaurao	INC	40,599	21.31	56,446	29.63
Parbhani	95	Jintur	Vijay Manikrao Bhamale	NCP	1,06,912	44.62	Kadam Ramprasad	INC	79,554	33.20	27,358	11.42
Parbhani	96	Parbhani	Rahul Vedprakash Patil	SS	71,584	37.62	Syad Khalad	AIMIM	45,058	23.68	26,526	13.94
Parbhani	97	Gangakhed	Madhusudan Manikrao Kendre	NCP	58,415	22.92	Ratnakar Gutte	RSPS	56,126	22.02	2,289	0.90
Parbhani	98	Pathri	Mohan Fad	IND	69,081	29.53	Suresh Warpudkar	INC	55,632	23.78	13,449	5.75
Jalna	99	Partur	Babanrao Lonikar	BJP	46,937	24.98	Jethaliya Kanhaiyyalal	INC	42,577	22.66	4,360	2.32
Jalna	100	Ghansawangi	Rajesh Tope	NCP	98,030	45.88	Kharat Vilasrao	BJP	54,554	25.53	43,476	20.35
Jalna	101	Jalna	Arjun Khotkar	SS	45,078	25.34	Kailas Kisanrao	INC	44,782	25.17	296	0.17
Jalna	102	Badnapur (SC)	Narayan Tilakchand Kuche	BJP	73,560	39.21	Chaudhari Roopkumar	NCP	50,065	26.69	23,495	12.52
Jalna	103	Bhokardan	Santosh Danve	BJP	69,597	35.11	Chandrakant Danve	NCP	62,847	31.71	6,750	3.40
Aurangabad	104	Sillod	Abdul Sattar	INC	96,038	45.76	Bankar Suresh	BJP	82,117	39.13	13,921	6.63
Aurangabad	105	Kannad	Harshvardhan Jadhav	SS	62,542	32.61	Udaysingh Rajput	NCP	60,981	31.80	1,561	0.81
Aurangabad	106	Phulambri	Haribhau Bagade	BJP	73,294	34.92	Kalyan Vaijinathrao	INC	69,683	33.20	3,611	1.72
Aurangabad	107	Aurangabad Central	Imtiyaz Jaleel	AIMIM	61,843	32.81	Pradeep Jaiswal	SS	41,861	22.21	19,982	10.60
Aurangabad	108	Aurangabad West (SC)	Sanjay Shirsat	SS	61,282	32.98	Madhukar Damodhar	BJP	54,355	29.25	6,927	3.73
Aurangabad	109	Aurangabad East	Atul Save	BJP	64,528	36.78	Abdul Gaffar	AIMIM	60,268	34.36	4,260	2.42
Aurangabad	110	Paithan	Sandipanrao Bhumre	SS	66,991	34.52	Sanjay Waghchaure	NCP	41,952	21.62	25,039	12.90
Aurangabad	111	Gangapur	Prashant Bamb	BJP	55,483	30.13	Ambadas Danve	SS	38,205	20.75	17,278	9.38
Aurangabad	112	Vaijapur	Bhausaheb Patil	NCP	53,114	27.53	Rangnath Wani	SS	48,405	25.09	4,709	2.44
Nashik	113	Nandgaon	Pankaj Bhujbal	NCP	69,263	34.45	Suhas Kande	SS	50,827	25.28	18,436	9.17
Nashik	114	Malegaon Central	Shaikh Aasif Shaikh Rashid	INC	75,326	45.34	Mh. Ismail Abdul Khalique	NCP	59,175	35.62	16,151	9.72
Nashik	115	Malegaon Outer	Dadaji Bhuse	SS	82,093	45.38	Thakre Pawan	BJP	44,672	24.69	37,421	20.69
Nashik	116	Baglan (ST)	Dipika Sanjay Chavan	NCP	68,434	43.69	Dilip Manglu Borse	BJP	64,253	41.02	4,181	2.67
Nashik	117	Kalwan (ST)	Jiva Pandu Gavit	CPI(M)	67,795	38.76	Arjun Tulshiram Pawar	NCP	63,009	36.03	4,786	2.73
Nashik	118	Chandvad	Rahul Daulatrao Aher	BJP	54,946	29.89	Shirishkumar Kotwal	INC	43,785	23.82	11,161	6.07
Nashik	119	Yevla	Chhagan Bhujbal	NCP	1,12,787	58.19	Pawar Sambhaji	SS	66,345	34.23	46,442	23.96
Nashik	120	Sinnar	Rajabhau Waje	SS	1,04,031	52.88	Manikrao Kokate	BJP	83,477	42.43	20,554	10.45
Nashik	121	Niphad	Anil Kadam	SS	78,186	42.85	Diliprao Shankarrao Bankar	NCP	74,265	40.70	3,921	2.15
Nashik	122	Dindori (ST)	Narhari Zirwal	NCP	68,284	33.83	Dhanraj Haribhau	SS	55,651	27.57	12,633	6.26
Nashik	123	Nashik East	Balasaheb Mahadu Sanap	BJP	78,941	47.23	Chandrakant Pandurang	SS	32,567	19.48	46,374	27.75
Nashik	124	Nashik Central	Devayani Farande	BJP	61,548	38.30	Vasant (Bhau)	MNS	33,276	20.71	28,272	17.59
Nashik	125	Nashik West	Seema Mahesh Hiray	BJP	67,489	34.12	Badgujar Sudhakar	SS	37,819	19.12	29,670	15.00
Nashik	126	Devlali (SC)	Yogesh Gholap	SS	49,751	37.51	Sadafule Dayaram	BJP	21,580	16.27	28,171	21.24
Nashik	127	Igatpuri (ST)	Gaveet Nirmala Ramesh	INC	49,128	31.45	Zhole Shivram	SS	38,751	24.81	10,377	6.64
Palghar	128	Dahanu (ST)	Dhanare Paskal Janya	BJP	44,849	28.96	Mangat Barkya	CPI(M)	28,149	18.18	16,700	10.78
Palghar	129	Vikramgad (ST)	Vishnu Savara	BJP	40,201	24.29	Prakash Krushna	SS	36,356	21.96	3,845	2.33
Palghar	130	Palghar (ST)	Krushna Ghoda	SS	46,142	28.12	Rajendra Gavit	INC	45,627	27.80	515	0.32
Palghar	131	Boisar (ST)	Vilas Tare	BVA	64,550	37.69	Kamalakar Anya	SS	51,677	30.17	12,873	7.52
Palghar	132	Nalasopara	Kshitij Thakur	BVA	1,13,566	50.29	Rajan Balkrishna	BJP	59,067	26.16	54,499	24.13
Palghar	133	Vasai	Hitendra Thakur	BVA	97,291	51.04	Vivek Raghunath Pandit	IND	65,395	34.30	31,896	16.74
Thane	134	Bhiwandi Rural (ST)	Shantaram More	SS	57,082	32.84	Patil Shantaram	BJP	47,922	27.57	9,160	5.27
Thane	135	Shahapur (ST)	Pandurang Barora	NCP	56,813	36.72	Daulat Daroda	SS	51,269	33.13	5,544	3.59
Thane	136	Bhiwandi West	Mahesh Prabhakar Choughule	BJP	42,483	33.99	Khan Shoeb	INC	39,157	31.33	3,326	2.66
Thane	137	Bhiwandi East	Rupesh Laxman Mhatre	SS	33,541	27.56	Santosh Manjayya	BJP	30,148	24.77	3,393	2.79
Thane	138	Kalyan West	Narendra Pawar	BJP	54,388	30.58	Vijay Salvi	SS	52,169	29.33	2,219	1.25
Thane	139	Murbad	Kisan Kathore	BJP	85,543	37.95	Gotiram Padu	NCP	59,313	26.32	26,230	11.63
Thane	140	Ambernath (SC)	Balaji Kinikar	SS	47,000	34.42	Rajesh Devendra	BJP	44,959	32.92	2,041	1.50
Thane	141	Ulhasnagar	Jyoti Kalani	NCP	43,760	35.04	Kumar Ailani	BJP	41,897	33.55	1,863	1.49
Thane	142	Kalyan East	Ganpat Gaikwad	IND	36,357	25.71	Gopal Ramchandra	SS	35,612	25.19	745	0.52
Thane	143	Dombivali	Ravindra Chavan	BJP	83,872	55.44	Dipesh Pundalik	SS	37,647	24.89	46,225	30.55
Thane	144	Kalyan Rural	Subhash Bhoir	SS	84,110	50.22	Ramesh Ratan	MNS	39,898	23.82	44,212	26.40
Thane	145	Mira Bhayandar	Narendra Mehta	BJP	91,468	47.58	Gilbert Mendonca	NCP	59,176	30.78	32,292	16.80
Thane	146	Ovala - Majiwada	Pratap Sarnaik	SS	68,571	36.75	Sanjay Pandey	BJP	57,665	30.91	10,906	5.84
Thane	147	Kopri-Pachpakhadi	Eknath Shinde	SS	1,00,316	54.34	Adv. Sandeep	BJP	48,447	26.24	51,869	28.10
Thane	148	Thane	Sanjay Mukund Kelkar	BJP	70,884	38.86	Ravindra Phatak	SS	58,296	31.96	12,588	6.90
Thane	149	Mumbra-Kalwa	Jitendra Awhad	NCP	86,533	52.33	Dasharath Kashinath	SS	38,850	23.50	47,683	28.83
Thane	150	Airoli	Sandeep Naik	NCP	76,444	36.35	Chougule Vijay	SS	67,719	32.20	8,725	4.15
Thane	151	Belapur	Manda Vijay Mhatre	BJP	55,316	29.08	Ganesh Naik	NCP	53,825	28.30	1,491	0.78
Mumbai Suburban	152	Borivali	Vinod Tawde	BJP	1,08,278	60.50	Agarwal Uttamprakash	SS	29,011	16.21	79,267	44.29
Mumbai Suburban	153	Dahisar	Manisha Ashok Chaudhary	BJP	77,238	48.31	Vinod Ghosalkar	SS	38,660	24.18	38,578	24.13
Mumbai Suburban	154	Magathane	Prakash Surve	SS	65,016	40.09	Hemendra Ratilal	BJP	44,631	27.52	20,385	12.57
Mumbai Suburban	155	Mulund	Tara Singh	BJP	93,850	54.79	Charan Singh	INC	28,543	16.66	65,307	38.13
Mumbai Suburban	156	Vikhroli	Sunil Raut	SS	50,302	38.24	Mangesh Eknath	MNS	24,963	18.98	25,339	19.26
Mumbai Suburban	157	Bhandup West	Ashok Patil	SS	48,151	29.14	Manoj Kotak	BJP	43,379	26.26	4,772	2.88
Mumbai Suburban	158	Jogeshwari East	Ravindra Waikar	SS	72,767	45.13	Ujwala Modak	BJP	43,805	27.17	28,962	17.96
Mumbai Suburban	159	Dindoshi	Sunil Prabhu	SS	56,577	35.47	Rajhans Singh	INC	36,749	23.04	19,828	12.43
Mumbai Suburban	160	Kandivali East	Atul Bhatkhalkar	BJP	72,427	49.22	Thakur Ramesh	INC	31,239	21.23	41,188	27.99
Mumbai Suburban	161	Charkop	Yogesh Sagar	BJP	96,097	60.19	Shubhada Subhash	SS	31,730	19.87	64,367	40.32
Mumbai Suburban	162	Malad West	Aslam Shaikh	INC	56,574	37.28	Ram Barot	BJP	54,271	35.76	2,303	1.52
Mumbai Suburban	163	Goregaon	Vidya Thakur	BJP	63,629	38.85	Subhash Desai	SS	58,873	35.95	4,756	2.90
Mumbai Suburban	164	Versova	Bharati Lavekar	BJP	49,182	41.94	Baldev Khosa	INC	22,784	19.43	26,398	22.51
Mumbai Suburban	165	Andheri West	Ameet Satam	BJP	59,022	41.07	Ashok Jadhav	INC	34,982	24.34	24,040	16.73
Mumbai Suburban	166	Andheri East	Ramesh Latke	SS	52,817	34.52	Sunil Lalanprasad	BJP	47,338	30.94	5,479	3.58
Mumbai Suburban	167	Vile Parle	Parag Alavani	BJP	74,270	48.99	Shashikant Govind	SS	41,835	27.59	32,435	21.40
Mumbai Suburban	168	Chandivali	Naseem Khan	INC	73,141	39.51	Santosh Ramniwas	SS	43,672	23.59	29,469	15.92
Mumbai Suburban	169	Ghatkopar West	Ram Kadam	BJP	80,343	50.29	Sudhir Sayaji	SS	38,427	24.05	41,916	26.24
Mumbai Suburban	170	Ghatkopar East	Prakash Mehta	BJP	67,012	47.90	Jagdish Chagan	SS	26,885	19.22	40,127	28.68
Mumbai Suburban	171	Mankhurd Shivaji Nagar	Abu Azmi	SP	41,719	32.62	Suresh Krishnarao	SS	31,782	24.85	9,937	7.77
Mumbai Suburban	172	Anushakti Nagar	Tukaram Ramkrishna Kate	SS	39,966	29.54	Nawab Malik	NCP	38,959	28.80	1,007	0.74
Mumbai Suburban	173	Chembur	Prakash Phaterpekar	SS	47,410	33.99	Chandrakant Handore	INC	37,383	26.80	10,027	7.19
Mumbai Suburban	174	Kurla (SC)	Mangesh Kudalkar	SS	41,580	31.04	Vijay Baburao	BJP	28,901	21.57	12,679	9.47
Mumbai Suburban	175	Kalina	Sanjay Potnis	SS	30,715	24.21	Singh Awadhnarayan	BJP	29,418	23.19	1,297	1.02
Mumbai Suburban	176	Vandre East	Prakash (Bala)	SS	41,388	33.23	Krishna Dhondu	BJP	25,791	20.71	15,597	12.52
Mumbai Suburban	177	Vandre West	Av. Ashish	BJP	74,779	50.93	Baba Ziauddin	INC	47,868	32.60	26,911	18.33
Mumbai City	178	Dharavi (SC)	Varsha Gaikwad	INC	47,718	40.38	Baburao Mane	SS	32,390	27.41	15,328	12.97
Mumbai City	179	Sion Koliwada	R. Tamil Selvan	BJP	40,869	30.50	Mangesh Satamkar	SS	37,131	27.71	3,738	2.79
Mumbai City	180	Wadala	Kalidas Kolambkar	INC	38,540	31.88	Mihir Kotecha	BJP	37,740	31.22	800	0.66
Mumbai City	181	Mahim	Sada Sarvankar	SS	46,291	33.97	Nitin Sardesai	MNS	40,350	29.61	5,941	4.36
Mumbai City	182	Worli	Sunil Shinde	SS	60,625	40.90	Sachin Ahir	NCP	37,613	25.38	23,012	15.52
Mumbai City	183	Shivadi	Ajay Choudhari	SS	72,462	49.27	Bala Nandgaonkar	MNS	30,553	20.77	41,909	28.50
Mumbai City	184	Byculla	Waris Pathan	AIMIM	25,314	20.33	Madhu (Dada)	BJP	23,957	19.24	1,357	1.09
Mumbai City	185	Malabar Hill	Mangal Lodha	BJP	97,818	67.05	Arvind Devji	SS	29,132	19.97	68,686	47.08
Mumbai City	186	Mumbadevi	Amin Patel	INC	39,188	35.55	Atul Shah	BJP	30,675	27.83	8,513	7.72
Mumbai City	187	Colaba	Raj K. Purohit	BJP	52,608	44.86	Pandurang Ganpat	SS	28,821	24.57	23,787	20.29
Raigad	188	Panvel	Prashant Thakur	BJP	1,25,142	44.16	Balaram Dattusheth	PWPI	1,11,927	39.50	13,215	4.66
Raigad	189	Karjat	Suresh Narayan Lad	NCP	57,013	31.12	Mahendra Sadashiv	PWPI	55,113	30.08	1,900	1.04
Raigad	190	Uran	Manohar Bhoir	SS	56,131	28.36	Vivek Patil	PWPI	55,320	27.95	811	0.41
Raigad	191	Pen	Dhairyashil Patil	PWPI	64,616	31.92	Ravisheth Patil	INC	60,496	29.88	4,120	2.04
Raigad	192	Alibag	Subhash Alias	PWPI	76,959	38.02	Mahendra Dalvi	SS	60,865	30.07	16,094	7.95
Raigad	193	Shrivardhan	Avdhoot Tatkare	NCP	61,038	40.43	Ravindra Ramji	SS	60,961	40.38	77	0.05
Raigad	194	Mahad	Bharatshet Gogawale	SS	94,408	52.13	Manik Motiram	INC	73,152	40.39	21,256	11.74
Pune	195	Junnar	Sharad Sonavane	MNS	60,305	30.61	Ashatai Dattatray	SS	43,382	22.02	16,923	8.59
Pune	196	Ambegaon	Dilip Walse Patil	NCP	1,20,235	62.12	Arun Govindrao	SS	62,081	32.08	58,154	30.04
Pune	197	Khed Alandi	Suresh Gore	SS	1,03,207	51.59	Dilip Mohite	NCP	70,489	35.24	32,718	16.35
Pune	198	Shirur	Baburao Pacharne	BJP	92,579	42.82	Ashok Raosaheb Pawar	NCP	81,638	37.76	10,941	5.06
Pune	199	Daund	Rahul Kul	RSPS	87,649	43.95	Ramesh Kisan	NCP	76,304	38.26	11,345	5.69
Pune	200	Indapur	Dattatray Vithoba Bharne	NCP	1,08,400	49.72	Harshvardhan Patil	INC	94,227	43.22	14,173	6.50
Pune	201	Baramati	Ajit Pawar	NCP	1,50,588	65.98	Prabhakar Dadaram	BJP	60,797	26.64	89,791	39.34
Pune	202	Purandar	Vijay Shivtare	SS	82,339	38.91	Sanjay Jagtap	INC	73,749	34.85	8,590	4.06
Pune	203	Bhor	Sangram Anantrao Thopate	INC	78,602	35.96	Kuldip Sudam	SS	59,651	27.29	18,951	8.67
Pune	204	Maval	Bala Bhegade	BJP	95,319	45.76	Dnyanoba Alias	NCP	67,318	32.32	28,001	13.44
Pune	205	Chinchwad	Laxman Pandurang Jagtap	BJP	1,23,786	45.42	Kalate Rahul	SS	63,489	23.29	60,297	22.13
Pune	206	Pimpri (SC)	Gautam Chabukswar	SS	51,096	28.88	Anna Dadu	NCP	48,761	27.56	2,335	1.32
Pune	207	Bhosari	Mahesh Landge	IND	60,173	27.19	Ubale Sulabha	SS	44,857	20.27	15,316	6.92
Pune	208	Vadgaon Sheri	Jagdish Mulik	BJP	66,908	30.23	Sunil Tingre	SS	61,583	27.83	5,325	2.40
Pune	209	Shivajinagar	Vijay Kale	BJP	56,460	38.03	Vinayak Nimhan	INC	34,413	23.18	22,047	14.85
Pune	210	Kothrud	Medha Kulkarni	BJP	1,00,941	51.15	Chandrakant Mokate	SS	36,279	18.38	64,662	32.77
Pune	211	Khadakwasala	Bhimrao Tapkir	BJP	1,11,531	47.43	Barate Dilip	NCP	48,505	20.63	63,026	26.80
Pune	212	Parvati	Madhuri Misal	BJP	95,583	50.37	Taware Sachin	SS	26,493	13.96	69,090	36.41
Pune	213	Hadapsar	Yogesh Tilekar	BJP	82,629	37.87	Baber Ramchandra	SS	52,381	24.01	30,248	13.86
Pune	214	Pune Cantonment (SC)	Dilip Kamble	BJP	54,692	39.65	Bagave Ramesh	INC	39,737	28.81	14,955	10.84
Pune	215	Kasba Peth	Girish Bapat	BJP	73,594	43.44	Rohit Deepak	INC	31,322	18.49	42,272	24.95
Ahmednagar	216	Akole (ST)	Vaibhav Madhukar Pichad	NCP	67,696	42.03	Talpade Madhukar	SS	47,634	29.57	20,062	12.46
Ahmednagar	217	Sangamner	Balasaheb Thorat	INC	1,03,564	56.88	Aher Janardan	SS	44,759	24.58	58,805	32.30
Ahmednagar	218	Shirdi	Radhakrishna Vikhe Patil	INC	1,21,459	63.11	Abhay Dattatraya	SS	46,797	24.31	74,662	38.80
Ahmednagar	219	Kopargaon	Snehalata Kolhe	BJP	99,763	50.78	Ashutosh Ashokrao Kale	SS	70,493	35.88	29,270	14.90
Ahmednagar	220	Shrirampur (SC)	Bhausaheb Malhari Kamble	INC	57,118	31.31	Bhausaheb Rajaram Wakchaure	BJP	45,634	25.02	11,484	6.29
Ahmednagar	221	Nevasa	Shankarrao Gadakh	BJP	84,570	47.46	Shankarrao Gadakh	NCP	79,911	44.84	4,659	2.62
Ahmednagar	222	Shevgaon	Monika Rajiv Rajale	BJP	1,34,685	58.53	Ghule Chandrashekhar	NCP	81,500	35.42	53,185	23.11
Ahmednagar	223	Rahuri	Shivaji Bhanudas Kardile	BJP	91,454	47.09	Usha Prasad	SS	65,778	33.87	25,676	13.22
Ahmednagar	224	Parner	Vijayrao Bhaskarrao Auti	SS	73,263	36.35	Sujit Vasantrao	NCP	45,841	22.75	27,422	13.60
Ahmednagar	225	Ahmednagar City	Sangram Arun Jagtap	NCP	49,378	29.79	Anil Rathod	SS	46,061	27.79	3,317	2.00
Ahmednagar	226	Shrigonda	Jagtap Rahul	NCP	99,281	45.74	Babanrao Pachpute	BJP	85,644	39.46	13,637	6.28
Ahmednagar	227	Karjat Jamkhed	Ram Shinde	BJP	84,058	43.04	Khade Ramesh	SS	46,242	23.68	37,816	19.36
Beed	228	Georai	Laxman Pawar	BJP	1,36,384	57.95	Badamrao Pandit	NCP	76,383	32.46	60,001	25.49
Beed	229	Majalgaon	R. T. Deshmukh	BJP	1,12,497	52.61	Prakashdada Solanke	NCP	75,252	35.19	37,245	17.42
Beed	230	Beed	Jaydattaji Kshirsagar	NCP	77,134	38.08	Vinayak Mete	BJP	71,002	35.05	6,132	3.03
Beed	231	Ashti	Dhonde Bhimrao	BJP	1,20,915	48.27	Suresh Dhas	NCP	1,14,933	45.88	5,982	2.39
Beed	232	Kaij (SC)	Sangeeta Thombre	BJP	1,06,834	49.68	Namita Mundada	NCP	64,113	29.82	42,721	19.86
Beed	233	Parli	Pankaja Munde	BJP	96,904	49.56	Dhananjay Munde	NCP	71,009	36.32	25,895	13.24
Latur	234	Latur Rural	Trimbakrao Shrirangrao Bhise	INC	1,00,897	49.10	Ramesh Karad	BJP	90,387	43.99	10,510	5.11
Latur	235	Latur City	Amit Deshmukh	INC	1,19,656	58.82	Lahoti Shailesh	BJP	70,191	34.50	49,465	24.32
Latur	236	Ahmadpur	Vinayakrao Kishanrao Jadhav Patil	IND	61,957	30.35	Babasaheb Mohanrao Patil	NCP	57,951	28.39	4,006	1.96
Latur	237	Udgir (SC)	Sudhakar Sangram Bhalerao	BJP	66,686	39.20	Sanjay Bansode	NCP	41,792	24.57	24,894	14.63
Latur	238	Nilanga	Sambhaji Patil Nilangekar	BJP	76,817	39.68	Shivajirao Patil Nilangekar	INC	49,306	25.47	27,511	14.21
Latur	239	Ausa	Basavraj Madhavrao Patil	INC	64,237	36.72	Dinkar Baburao	SS	55,379	31.66	8,858	5.06
Osmanabad	240	Umarga (SC)	Dnyanraj Chougule	SS	65,178	39.99	Kisan Nagnath	INC	44,736	27.45	20,442	12.54
Osmanabad	241	Tuljapur	Madhukarrao Chavan	INC	70,701	32.52	Gore Jeevanrao	NCP	41,091	18.90	29,610	13.62
Osmanabad	242	Osmanabad	Ranajagjitsinha Patil	NCP	88,469	40.87	Omprakash Raje Nimbalkar	SS	77,663	35.88	10,806	4.99
Osmanabad	243	Paranda	Rahul Maharuda	NCP	78,548	39.85	Dnyaneshwar Patil	SS	66,159	33.56	12,389	6.29
Solapur	244	Karmala	Narayan Patil	SS	60,674	29.94	Bagal Rashmee	NCP	60,417	29.81	257	0.13
Solapur	245	Madha	Babanrao Vitthalrao Shinde	NCP	97,803	43.82	Kale Kalyan	INC	62,025	27.79	35,778	16.03
Solapur	246	Barshi	Dilip Gangadhar Sopal	NCP	97,655	45.74	Rajendra Raut	SS	92,544	43.35	5,111	2.39
Solapur	247	Mohol (SC)	Ramesh Kadam	NCP	62,120	32.42	Sanjay Dattatray	BJP	53,753	28.05	8,367	4.37
Solapur	248	Solapur City North	Vijay Deshmukh	BJP	86,877	56.73	Mahesh Chandrakant	NCP	17,999	11.75	68,878	44.98
Solapur	249	Solapur City Central	Praniti Shinde	INC	46,907	28.90	Shekh Taufik	AIMIM	37,138	22.88	9,769	6.02
Solapur	250	Akkalkot	Siddharam Satlingappa Mhetre	INC	97,333	45.71	Patil Sidramappa	BJP	79,689	37.43	17,644	8.28
Solapur	251	Solapur South	Subhash Deshmukh	BJP	70,077	40.37	Dilip Brahmdev	INC	42,954	24.74	27,123	15.63
Solapur	252	Pandharpur	Bhalake Bharat	INC	91,863	40.08	Paricharak Shailendra	SWP	82,950	36.19	8,913	3.89
Solapur	253	Sangola	Ganpatrao Deshmukh	PWPI	94,374	47.64	Shahajibapu Patil	SS	69,150	34.91	25,224	12.73
Solapur	254	Malshiras (SC)	Hanumant Dolas	NCP	77,179	37.91	Khandagale Anant	IND	70,934	34.84	6,245	3.07
Satara	255	Phaltan (SC)	Dipak Pralhad Chavan	NCP	92,910	46.30	Digamber Rohidas	INC	59,342	29.57	33,568	16.73
Satara	256	Wai	Makrand Jadhav	NCP	1,01,218	46.35	Madan Prataprao	INC	62,516	28.63	38,702	17.72
Satara	257	Koregaon	Shashikant Shinde	NCP	95,213	53.29	Kanase Vijayrao	INC	47,966	26.84	47,247	26.45
Satara	258	Man	Jaykumar Gore	INC	75,708	34.53	Gore Shekhar	RSPS	52,357	23.88	23,351	10.65
Satara	259	Karad North	Shamrao Pandurang Patil	NCP	78,324	41.12	Kadam Dhairyashil	INC	57,817	30.36	20,507	10.76
Satara	260	Karad South	Prithviraj Chavan	INC	76,831	37.96	Vilasrao Patil	IND	60,413	29.85	16,418	8.11
Satara	261	Patan	Shambhuraj Desai	SS	1,04,419	50.54	Patankar Satyajit	NCP	85,595	41.43	18,824	9.11
Satara	262	Satara	Shivendra Raje Bhosale	NCP	97,964	52.30	Pawar Dipak	BJP	50,151	26.77	47,813	25.53
Ratnagiri	263	Dapoli	Sanjay Vasant	NCP	52,907	32.58	Dalvi Suryakant	SS	49,123	30.25	3,784	2.33
Ratnagiri	264	Guhagar	Bhaskar Jadhav	NCP	72,525	47.70	Dr. Natu	BJP	39,761	26.15	32,764	21.55
Ratnagiri	265	Chiplun	Sadanand Chavan	SS	75,695	45.18	Shekhar Govindrao Nikam	NCP	69,627	41.55	6,068	3.63
Ratnagiri	266	Ratnagiri	Uday Samant	SS	93,876	53.46	Balasaheb Mane	BJP	54,449	31.01	39,427	22.45
Ratnagiri	267	Rajapur	Rajan Salvi	SS	76,266	53.33	Rajendra Yashwant	INC	37,204	26.02	39,062	27.31
Sindhudurg	268	Kankavli	Nitesh Narayan Rane	INC	74,715	47.91	Jathar Pramod	BJP	48,736	31.25	25,979	16.66
Sindhudurg	269	Kudal	Vaibhav Naik	SS	70,582	50.03	Narayan Rane	INC	60,206	42.68	10,376	7.35
Sindhudurg	270	Sawantwadi	Deepak Vasant Kesarkar	SS	70,902	48.60	Teli Rajan	BJP	29,710	20.37	41,192	28.23
Kolhapur	271	Chandgad	Sandhyadevi Desai	NCP	51,599	23.71	Narsingrao Gurunath	SS	43,400	19.95	8,199	3.76
Kolhapur	272	Radhanagari	Prakashrao Abitkar	SS	1,32,485	55.93	K. P.	NCP	93,077	39.30	39,408	16.63
Kolhapur	273	Kagal	Hasan Mushrif	NCP	1,23,626	49.16	Ghatage Sanjay	SS	1,17,692	46.80	5,934	2.36
Kolhapur	274	Kolhapur South	Amal Mahadik	BJP	1,05,489	48.40	Satej Patil	INC	96,961	44.49	8,528	3.91
Kolhapur	275	Karvir	Chandradip Narke	SS	1,07,998	44.25	P. N. Patil-Sadolikar	INC	1,07,288	43.96	710	0.29
Kolhapur	276	Kolhapur North	Rajesh Kshirsagar	SS	69,736	39.72	Kadam Satyajit	INC	47,315	26.95	22,421	12.77
Kolhapur	277	Shahuwadi	Satyajeet Patil	SS	74,702	35.67	Vinay Kore	JSS	74,314	35.49	388	0.18
Kolhapur	278	Hatkanangle (SC)	Sujit Minchekar	SS	89,087	39.81	Jaywantrao Awale	INC	59,717	26.68	29,370	13.13
Kolhapur	279	Ichalkaranji	Suresh Halvankar	BJP	94,214	47.12	Prakashanna Awade	INC	78,989	39.50	15,225	7.62
Kolhapur	280	Shirol	Ulhas Patil	SS	70,809	31.38	Rajendra Patil Yadravkar	NCP	50,776	22.50	20,033	8.88
Sangli	281	Miraj (SC)	Suresh Khade	BJP	93,795	50.60	Shidheshwar Jadhav	INC	29,728	16.04	64,067	34.56
Sangli	282	Sangli	Sudhir Gadgil	BJP	80,497	41.18	Madan Patil	INC	66,040	33.79	14,457	7.39
Sangli	283	Islampur	Jayant Patil	NCP	1,13,045	62.48	Abhijit Shivajirao	IND	37,859	20.92	75,186	41.56
Sangli	284	Shirala	Shivajirao Yashwantrao	BJP	85,363	39.07	Mansing Fattesingrao Naik	NCP	81,695	37.40	3,668	1.67
Sangli	285	Palus-Kadegaon	Patangrao Kadam	INC	1,12,523	53.95	Prithviraj Deshmukh	BJP	88,489	42.42	24,034	11.53
Sangli	286	Khanapur	Anil Babar	SS	72,849	33.43	Sadashivrao Patil	INC	53,052	24.34	19,797	9.09
Sangli	287	Tasgaon-Kavathe Mahankal	R. R. Patil	NCP	1,08,310	52.70	Ajitrao Ghorpade	BJP	85,900	41.79	22,410	10.91
Sangli	288	Jath	Vilasrao Jagtap	BJP	72,885	43.10	Vikramsinh Sawant	INC	55,187	32.63	17,698	10.47

== Vote Share ==
Party	Votes		Percentage	
Bharatiya Janata Party	14,709,276	▲83,57,129	27.81%	▲13.79%
Shiv Sena	10,235,970	▲28,66,940	19.35%	▲3.09%
Indian National Congress	9,496,095	▼25,608	17.95%	▼3.06%
Nationalist Congress Party	9,122,285	▲17,02,073	17.24%	▲0.87%

== Government formation ==
Fadnavis chosen over Nitin Gadkari. With the BJP having won a plurality, the NCP offered outside support to the BJP, according to Praful Patel. The NCP offer was read as putting the Shiv Sena under pressure by saying it gave the BJP "mega-clout" in negotiations with the Shiv Sena. Amit Shah did not turn down the offer saying that the party's parliamentary board, including Prime Minister Narendra Modi would discuss options. Other unnamed BJP members said the Shiv Sena was "a natural fit" with the party. Other unnamed BJP members said they expected the Shiv Sena to seek the post of deputy chief minister as well as more ministers in the national government. Unnamed Shiv Sena spokespeople told NDTV that, as potential kingmaker, Uddhav Thackeray would decide the next steps "in Maharashtra's best interest." Finally, BJP and Shiv Sena agreed to come together and form the government. Later on, in July 2020, NCP President Sharad Pawar said that NCP's outside support to the BJP government was a "political ploy" to keep the Shiv Sena away from the BJP. Pawar admitted that he took steps to "widen the distance between BJP and Shiv Sena".

== Bypolls (2014-2019) ==
S.No	Date	Constituency	MLA before election	Party before election	Elected MLA	Party after election
91	13 February 2015	Mukhed	Govind Rathod	Bharatiya Janata Party	Tushar Rathod	Bharatiya Janata Party
287	11 April 2015	Tasgaon	R. R. Patil	Nationalist Congress Party	Suman Patil	Nationalist Congress Party
176	11 April 2015	Vandre East	Prakash Sawant	Shiv Sena	Trupti Sawant	Shiv Sena
130	13 February 2016	Palghar	Krushna Arjun Ghoda	Shiv Sena	Amit Krushna Ghoda	Shiv Sena
285	28 May 2018	Palus-Kadegaon	Patangrao Kadam	Indian National Congress	Vishwajeet Kadam	Indian National Congress

== See also ==
- 2014 elections in India
