= Bharatiya Janata Party campaign for the 2014 Maharashtra Legislative Assembly election =

- Affiliation: Bharatiya Janata Party
- Key people: Amit Shah (BJP National President); Devendra Fadnavis (BJP Maharashtra President); Nitin Gadkari (Union Minister); Vinod Tawde (BJP Leader); Rajiv Pratap Rudy (BJP Maharashtra Observer)
- Slogan(s): Shiv Chhatrapatincha Ashirwaad, Chala deu Modi na Saath

The Bharatiya Janata Party contested the 2014 Maharashtra Legislative Assembly election independently on 260 seats after it broke up its 25 year old alliance with the Shiv Sena.

== Background ==
The election was held on 15 October 2014 with all the parties contesting independently without alliance, The BJP and the Shivsena broke up after BJP disagreed upon Shivsena's proposal of 151 seats for Shivsena and 119 for BJP and 18 seats for Others. The Indian National Congress and the Nationalist Congress Party also ended their 15 year old alliance after the Indian National Congress disagreed over the NCP's proposal of 50-50 CM formula and more contesting seats to the NCP.

== The Campaign ==
The Bharatiya Janata Party started its campaign from Mahalakshmi Racecourse, Mumbai where Prime Minister Narendra Modi addressed a rally and targeted the incumbent INC-NCP state government on various issues like Unemployment, Energy Crisis, Farmers Suicide and Security etc.

The BJP addressed over 715 rallies across the state with 27 special appearances made by star campaigner Narendra Modi, Union Minister Nitin Gadkari addressed over 104 rallies in various parts of Maharashtra.

Every BJP Chief Minister was placed to campaign in Maharashtra, Furthermore BJP poll strategists divided Maharashtra into 50 clusters, each comprising over 5-10 seats led by BJP leaders with proven skills. by this the BJP aimed to reach almost all corners of Maharashtra.

The BJP threw a blitzkrieg campaign, where leaders from National to local campaigned 24x7 to ensure Majority BJP Government in the state, Poll Vans with GPS were deployed across the state where Narendra Modi's and BJP's message for Development was reached to all the citizens of Maharashtra.

== Social Alliance ==
After ending the Alliance with the Shiv Sena, the BJP had the support of four small parties(RPI (Athawale), Rashtriya Samaj Paksha, Shiv Sangram, Swabhimani Shetkari Saghtana) which were in the Maha Yuti

through these four parties the BJP aimed to get the support of various groups such as Dalits, OBC, Farmers etc across the state.

== Results ==
The BJP became the largest party in the election by winning 122 seats out of 260 it contested, the Shiv Sena won 63 seats coming second, the Indian National Congress won 42 seats and the Nationalist Congress Party won 41 seats

Region	Total seats		
Region	Total seats	Bharatiya Janata Party	
Region	Total seats	Seats Won	
Western Maharashtra	70	24	▲15
Vidarbha	62	44	▲23
Marathwada	46	15	▲09
Thane+Konkan	39	10	▲06
Mumbai	36	15	▲10
North Maharashtra	35	14	▲13
Total	288	122	▲76
