= Dahanu Assembly constituency =

Constituency of the Maharashtra legislative assembly in India

Coordinates: 19.99°N 72.74°E

Dahanu
- Constituency No. 128 for the Maharashtra Legislative Assembly

Constituency details
- Country: India
- Region: Western India
- State: Maharashtra
- District: Palghar
- Lok Sabha constituency: Palghar
- Established: 1955
- Total electors: 301,257
- Reservation: ST

Member of Legislative Assembly
- 15th Maharashtra Legislative Assembly
- Incumbent Vinod Bhiva Nikole
- Party: CPI(M)
- Alliance: MVA
- Elected year: 2024

Dahanu Assembly constituency is one of the 288 Vidhan Sabha (Legislative Assembly) constituencies of Maharashtra state in western India.

== Overview ==
Dahanu constituency is one of the 6 Vidhan Sabha constituencies located in the Palghar district. It is reserved for the candidates belonging to the Scheduled tribes. It comprises the entire Talasari tehsil and part of Dahanu tehsil of the district.

Dahanu is part of the Palghar Lok Sabha constituency along with five other Vidhan Sabha segments, namely, Vikramgad, Palghar, Boisar, Nalasopara and Vasai in Palghar district.

== Members of Legislative Assembly ==
Year	Member	Party
From 1952 - 1957 see: Dahanu Umbergaon
1952	Shamrao Patil	Indian National Congress
1957	Shamrao Patil	Indian National Congress
1957	Santu Thakeria	Indian National Congress
1962	Shamrao Patil	Indian National Congress
1967	Mahadev Kadu	Indian National Congress
1972	Mahadev Kadu	Indian National Congress
1978	Shankar Chavan	Communist Party of India (Marxist)
1980	Mahadev Kadu	Indian National Congress (I)
1985	Shankar Nam	Indian National Congress
1990	Shankar Nam	Indian National Congress
1995	Shankar Nam	Indian National Congress
1999	Krishna Ghoda	Nationalist Congress Party
2004	Krishna Ghoda	Nationalist Congress Party
2009	Rajaram Ozare	Communist Party of India (Marxist)
2014	Paskal Dhanare	Bharatiya Janata Party
2019	Vinod Nikole	Communist Party of India (Marxist)
2024	Vinod Nikole	Communist Party of India (Marxist)

== Election results ==
=== Assembly Election 2024 ===
2024 Maharashtra Legislative Assembly election : Dahanu
Party	Candidate	Votes	%	±%
CPI(M)	Vinod Bhiva Nikole	104,702	48.33%	▲3.58
BJP	Medha Vinod Suresh	99,569	45.96%	▲4.13
NOTA	None of the Above	5,120	2.36%	▼0.63
Independent	Kalpesh Balu Bhavar	2,927	1.35%	New
MNS	Vijay Devaji Wadhia	2,388	1.10%	▼2.83
Independent	Bhasara Vasant Navsha	2,353	1.09%	New
Independent	Meena Kishor Bhad	1,923	0.89%	New
BSP	Santosh Ramji Thakare	1,654	0.76%	▼0.89
Margin of victory		5,133	2.37%	▼0.55
Turnout		221,769	73.61%	▲12.68
Total valid votes		216,649		
Registered electors		301,257		▲10.72
CPI(M) hold		Swing	▲3.58	

=== Assembly Election 2019 ===
2019 Maharashtra Legislative Assembly election : Dahanu
Party	Candidate	Votes	%	±%
CPI(M)	Vinod Bhiva Nikole	72,114	44.75%	▲26.03
BJP	Dhanare Paskal Janya	67,407	41.83%	▲12.00
MNS	Sunil Lahanya Ebhad	6,332	3.93%	New
NOTA	None of the Above	4,824	2.99%	▲0.00
Independent	Randhe Damodar Shirad	2,823	1.75%	New
BSP	Dumada Rajesh Ravaji	2,671	1.66%	New
API	Dhi.Santosh Kisan Pagi	2,648	1.64%	New
Independent	Ramesh Janu Malavkar	2,242	1.39%	New
Margin of victory		4,707	2.92%	▼8.19
Turnout		166,029	61.02%	▼4.97
Total valid votes		161,157		
Registered electors		272,085		▲16.19
CPI(M) gain from BJP		Swing	▲14.92	

=== Assembly Election 2014 ===
2014 Maharashtra Legislative Assembly election : Dahanu
Party	Candidate	Votes	%	±%
BJP	Dhanare Paskal Janya	44,849	29.83%	New
CPI(M)	Mangat Barkya Vansha	28,149	18.72%	▼28.56
NCP	Kashinath Govind Chaudhari	27,963	18.60%	▼16.45
INC	Padwale Ramesh Dama	14,166	9.42%	New
Independent	Sudhir Rajaram Ozare	12,968	8.63%	New
SS	Nam Shankar Sakharam	7,847	5.22%	▼8.36
Independent	Suresh Arjun Padvi	5,165	3.44%	New
NOTA	None of the Above	4,498	2.99%	New
Margin of victory		16,700	11.11%	▼1.13
Turnout		154,849	66.13%	▲8.23
Total valid votes		150,351		
Registered electors		234,175		▼0.88
BJP gain from CPI(M)		Swing	▼17.45	

=== Assembly Election 2009 ===
2009 Maharashtra Legislative Assembly election : Dahanu
Party	Candidate	Votes	%	±%
CPI(M)	Rajaram Ozare	62,530	47.28%	▲37.80
NCP	Ghoda Krishna Arjun	46,350	35.05%	▼14.77
SS	Dhodi Ishwar Kisan	17,955	13.58%	▼19.20
BSP	Shinda Vinod Bendya	5,412	4.09%	▲1.19
Margin of victory		16,180	12.23%	▼4.81
Turnout		132,247	55.98%	▲1.11
Total valid votes		132,247		
Registered electors		236,251		▼11.18
CPI(M) gain from NCP		Swing	▼2.54	

=== Assembly Election 2004 ===
2004 Maharashtra Legislative Assembly election : Dahanu
Party	Candidate	Votes	%	±%
NCP	Krushna Ghoda	72,715	49.82%	▲13.64
SS	Ishwar Kisan Dhodi	47,843	32.78%	▲6.68
CPI(M)	Vartha Edward Henry	13,844	9.49%	▼5.02
Independent	Katkar Vinod Gangaram	7,304	5.00%	New
BSP	Lalita Manu Rathod	4,242	2.91%	New
Margin of victory		24,872	17.04%	▲6.97
Turnout		145,948	54.87%	▲5.07
Total valid votes		145,948		
Registered electors		265,991		▲17.18
NCP hold		Swing	▲13.64	

=== Assembly Election 1999 ===
1999 Maharashtra Legislative Assembly election : Dahanu
Party	Candidate	Votes	%	±%
NCP	Krushna Ghoda	40,895	36.18%	New
SS	Ishwar Kisan Dhodi	29,508	26.11%	▼2.78
INC	Babu Lakhama Waghat	26,230	23.21%	▼21.64
CPI(M)	Sutar Gangaram Dhakat	16,402	14.51%	▼8.83
Margin of victory		11,387	10.07%	▼5.89
Turnout		123,598	54.45%	▼14.92
Total valid votes		113,035		
Registered electors		227,001		▲4.89
NCP gain from INC		Swing	▼8.67	

=== Assembly Election 1995 ===
1995 Maharashtra Legislative Assembly election : Dahanu
Party	Candidate	Votes	%	±%
INC	Nam Shankar Sakharam	62,813	44.85%	▲4.05
SS	Kanbi Kisan Lallubhai	40,458	28.89%	▲6.28
CPI(M)	Kom Lahanu Shidva	32,689	23.34%	▲3.16
Independent	Dombre Somnath Rama	3,246	2.32%	New
Doordarshi Party	Marle Gajanan Narayan	845	0.60%	▲0.08
Margin of victory		22,355	15.96%	▼2.23
Turnout		147,307	68.06%	▲10.74
Total valid votes		140,051		
Registered electors		216,426		▲32.44
INC hold		Swing	▲4.05	

=== Assembly Election 1990 ===
1990 Maharashtra Legislative Assembly election : Dahanu
Party	Candidate	Votes	%	±%
INC	Nam Shankar Sakharam	35,981	40.80%	▼24.97
SS	Keny Ramkrishna Mangesh	19,937	22.61%	New
CPI(M)	Chavan Shankar Marya	17,793	20.18%	▼0.26
Independent	Dagla Marhya Radhya	14,014	15.89%	New
Margin of victory		16,044	18.19%	▼27.14
Turnout		90,910	55.63%	▲13.87
Total valid votes		88,188		
Registered electors		163,412		▲25.35
INC hold		Swing	▼24.97	

=== Assembly Election 1985 ===
1985 Maharashtra Legislative Assembly election : Dahanu
Party	Candidate	Votes	%	±%
INC	Nam Shankar Sakharam	34,385	65.77%	New
CPI(M)	Sutar Gangaram Dhakat	10,685	20.44%	▼21.92
JP	Dhinde Lahanu Ladkya	7,208	13.79%	New
Margin of victory		23,700	45.33%	▲30.05
Turnout		54,302	41.65%	▲2.86
Total valid votes		52,278		
Registered electors		130,366		▲9.66
INC gain from INC(I)		Swing	▲8.13	

=== Assembly Election 1980 ===
1980 Maharashtra Legislative Assembly election : Dahanu
Party	Candidate	Votes	%	±%
INC(I)	Kadu Mahadeo Gopal	25,522	57.64%	New
CPI(M)	Chavan Shankar Marya	18,753	42.36%	▼5.37
Margin of victory		6,769	15.29%	▲6.72
Turnout		46,064	38.75%	▼13.62
Total valid votes		44,275		
Registered electors		118,878		▲10.04
INC(I) gain from CPI(M)		Swing	▲9.92	

=== Assembly Election 1978 ===
1978 Maharashtra Legislative Assembly election : Dahanu
Party	Candidate	Votes	%	±%
CPI(M)	Chavan Shankar Marya	26,224	47.73%	▲0.42
INC	Kadu Mahadeo Gopal	21,514	39.16%	▼13.53
Independent	Lahanu Ladakya Dhinde	7,206	13.12%	New
Margin of victory		4,710	8.57%	▲3.19
Turnout		57,706	53.42%	▼3.00
Total valid votes		54,944		
Registered electors		108,031		▲16.23
CPI(M) gain from INC		Swing	▼4.96	

=== Assembly Election 1972 ===
1972 Maharashtra Legislative Assembly election : Dahanu
Party	Candidate	Votes	%	±%
INC	Mahadeo Gopal Kadu	26,378	52.69%	▲0.47
CPI(M)	Kom Lahanu Shidwa	23,685	47.31%	▲10.68
Margin of victory		2,693	5.38%	▼10.21
Turnout		52,965	56.99%	▼1.73
Total valid votes		50,063		
Registered electors		92,945		▲30.82
INC hold		Swing	▲0.47	

=== Assembly Election 1967 ===
1967 Maharashtra Legislative Assembly election : Dahanu
Party	Candidate	Votes	%	±%
INC	Mahadeo Gopal Kadu	20,627	52.22%	▲10.79
CPI(M)	N. R. Ozarya	14,469	36.63%	New
ABJS	D. N. Bendar	2,813	7.12%	New
PSP	K. N. Bhimara	1,592	4.03%	▼19.64
Margin of victory		6,158	15.59%	▲9.07
Turnout		43,445	61.15%	▼8.71
Total valid votes		39,501		
Registered electors		71,050		▲39.86
INC hold		Swing	▲10.79	

=== Assembly Election 1962 ===
1962 Maharashtra Legislative Assembly election : Dahanu
Party	Candidate	Votes	%	±%
INC	Shamrao Ramchandra Patil	13,533	41.42%	▲10.35
CPI	Godavari Shamrao Parulekar	11,403	34.90%	▲12.38
PSP	Parshuram Dharmaji Churi	7,733	23.67%	New
Margin of victory		2,130	6.52%	▲3.14
Turnout		35,035	68.97%	▼53.88
Total valid votes		32,669		
Registered electors		50,801		▼59.32
INC hold		Swing	▲10.35	

=== Assembly Election 1957 ===
1957 Bombay State Legislative Assembly election : Dahanu
Party	Candidate	Votes	%	±%
INC	Shamrao Ramchandra Patil	45,871	31.08%	New
INC	Thakaria Santu Devoo (St)	40,883	27.70%	New
CPI	Parulekar Godavari Shamrao	33,249	22.53%	New
CPI	Sapatya Shidva Deoji (St)	27,602	18.70%	New
Margin of victory		4,988	3.38%	
Turnout		147,605	118.18%	
Total valid votes		147,605		
Registered electors		124,894		
INC win (new seat)				

== See also ==
- Dahanu
- List of constituencies of Maharashtra Vidhan Sabha
