= Melghat Assembly constituency =

Constituency of the Maharashtra legislative assembly in India

Coordinates: 21.35°N 77.49°E

Melghat
- Constituency No. 41 for the Maharashtra Legislative Assembly

Constituency details
- Country: India
- Region: Western India
- State: Maharashtra
- District: Amravati
- Lok Sabha constituency: Amravati
- Established: 1952
- Total electors: 302,341
- Reservation: ST

Member of Legislative Assembly
- 15th Maharashtra Legislative Assembly
- Incumbent Kewalram Tulsiram Kale
- Party: BJP
- Alliance: NDA
- Elected year: 2024

Melghat Assembly constituency is one of the 288 constituencies of Maharashtra Vidhan Sabha and one of the eight which are located in the Amravati district. It is reserved for Scheduled Tribe candidate.

It is a part of the Amravati (Lok Sabha constituency) along with five other Vidhan Sabha assembly constituencies, viz. Badnera Amravati, Teosa, Daryapur (SC), and Achalpur.

The remaining two Dhamangaon Railway and Morshi constituencies are part of Wardha (Lok Sabha constituency) in adjoining Wardha district.

As per orders of Delimitation of Parliamentary and Assembly constituencies Order, 2008, No. 41 Melghat Assembly constituency is composed of the following: 1. Dharni Tehsil, 2. Chikhaldara Tehsil. 3.Achalpur Tehsil (Part), Revenue Circle –Paratwada and Pathrot of the district.

== Members of the Legislative Assembly ==
Year	Member	Party
1952	Balkrishna Mulchand Bhandari	Indian National Congress
1957	Kokilabai Gawande Jagannath Patil	Indian National Congress
1962	Mamraj Khandelwal	Independent
1967	Dayaram Nanu Patel	Indian National Congress
1968^	Ramu Mhatang Patel	Indian National Congress
1972	Ramu Mhatang Patel	Indian National Congress
1978	Ramu Mhatang Patel	Indian National Congress (I)
1980	Narayan Nanu Patel	Indian National Congress (I)
1985	Ramu Mhatang Patel	Indian National Congress
1990	Tulshiram Kale	Indian National Congress
1995	Patlya (Guruji) Mavaskar	Bharatiya Janata Party
1999	Rajkumar Dayaram Patel	Bharatiya Janata Party
2004	Rajkumar Dayaram Patel	Bharatiya Janata Party
2009	Kewalram Kale	Indian National Congress
2014	Prabhudas Bhilawekar	Bharatiya Janata Party
2019	Rajkumar Dayaram Patel	Prahar Janshakti Party
2024	Kewalram Kale	Bharatiya Janata Party

^by-election

== Election results ==
=== Assembly Election 2024 ===
2024 Maharashtra Legislative Assembly election : Melghat
Party	Candidate	Votes	%	±%
BJP	Kewalram Tulsiram Kale	145,978	66.45%	▲42.33
INC	Dr. Hemant Nanda Chimote	39,119	17.81%	New
PHJSP	Rajkumar Dayaram Patel	25,281	11.51%	▼35.71
NOTA	None of the Above	2,462	1.12%	▼0.46
Independent	Ramesh Bhagavantrao Tote	2,445	1.11%	New
BSP	Motilal Batu Thakre	1,593	0.73%	▼0.19
Margin of victory		106,859	48.65%	▲25.55
Turnout		222,129	73.47%	▲8.12
Total valid votes		219,667		
Registered electors		302,341		▲8.94
BJP gain from PHJSP		Swing	▲19.24	

=== Assembly Election 2019 ===
2019 Maharashtra Legislative Assembly election : Melghat
Party	Candidate	Votes	%	±%
PHJSP	Rajkumar Dayaram Patel	84,569	47.22%	New
BJP	Ramesh Patlya Mawaskar	43,207	24.12%	▼8.99
NCP	Kewalram Tulsiram Kale	35,863	20.02%	▼11.94
Independent	Darsimbe Mannalal Khubilal	8,908	4.97%	New
NOTA	None of the Above	2,835	1.58%	▼0.49
Independent	Gangaram Kunjilal Jambekar	2,345	1.31%	New
BSP	Dhande Laxman Shikari	1,646	0.92%	▼1.76
Peoples Party of India (Democratic)	Umesh Shankarrao Jambhe	1,560	0.87%	New
Margin of victory		41,362	23.09%	▲21.94
Turnout		181,995	65.58%	▼2.32
Total valid votes		179,106		
Registered electors		277,523		▲7.78
PHJSP gain from BJP		Swing	▲14.10	

=== Assembly Election 2014 ===
2014 Maharashtra Legislative Assembly election : Melghat
Party	Candidate	Votes	%	±%
BJP	Prabhudas Babulal Bhilawekar	57,002	33.12%	▼9.91
NCP	Rajkumar Dayaram Patel	55,023	31.97%	New
INC	Kewalram Tulsiram Kale	48,529	28.19%	▼15.31
BSP	Kisan Jayaram Jamkar	4,604	2.67%	▲0.89
SS	Motilal Bhaiyyalal Kasdekar	4,334	2.52%	New
NOTA	None of the Above	3,567	2.07%	New
API	Vasudeo Santu Dhikar	2,641	1.53%	New
Margin of victory		1,979	1.15%	▲0.66
Turnout		175,765	68.26%	▼1.31
Total valid votes		172,133		
Registered electors		257,479		▲20.01
BJP gain from INC		Swing	▼10.39	

=== Assembly Election 2009 ===
2009 Maharashtra Legislative Assembly election : Melghat
Party	Candidate	Votes	%	±%
INC	Kewalram Tulsiram Kale	63,619	43.51%	▲0.35
BJP	Rajkumar Dayaram Patel	62,909	43.02%	▼2.96
Independent	Ravikumar Ramkisan Patel	5,886	4.03%	New
JSS	Hiralal Sakharam Mawaskar	5,346	3.66%	New
BSP	Munna Balaji Bethekar	2,614	1.79%	▼2.71
Independent	Punaji Subhaji More	1,919	1.31%	New
Independent	Patlya (Guruji) Mavaskar	1,512	1.03%	New
Margin of victory		710	0.49%	▼2.34
Turnout		146,259	68.17%	▲6.55
Total valid votes		146,231		
Registered electors		214,543		▼0.95
INC gain from BJP		Swing	▼2.47	

=== Assembly Election 2004 ===
2004 Maharashtra Legislative Assembly election : Melghat
Party	Candidate	Votes	%	±%
BJP	Rajkumar Dayaram Patel	61,354	45.98%	▲4.93
INC	Ramu Mhatang Patel	57,582	43.15%	▲5.23
BSP	Surajsingh Mohansingh Kumare	6,006	4.50%	▲4.09
Independent	Anil Ganaji Mavaskar	4,615	3.46%	New
Independent	Narayan Ramchandra Gavande (Dahikar)	2,074	1.55%	New
SP	Tulshiram Alies Mahadeo Dhurve	1,043	0.78%	New
Margin of victory		3,772	2.83%	▼0.31
Turnout		133,532	61.65%	▲5.88
Total valid votes		133,434		
Registered electors		216,597		▲13.40
BJP hold		Swing	▲4.93	

=== Assembly Election 1999 ===
1999 Maharashtra Legislative Assembly election : Melghat
Party	Candidate	Votes	%	±%
BJP	Rajkumar Dayaram Patel	43,698	41.06%	▲11.10
INC	Ramu Mhatang Patel	40,363	37.92%	▲24.07
NCP	Ramesh Raikwar	14,533	13.65%	New
Independent	Dayaram Sanu Kale	7,401	6.95%	New
Margin of victory		3,335	3.13%	▼1.01
Turnout		119,561	62.60%	▼10.63
Total valid votes		106,436		
Registered electors		191,002		▲1.56
BJP hold		Swing	▲11.10	

=== Assembly Election 1995 ===
1995 Maharashtra Legislative Assembly election : Melghat
Party	Candidate	Votes	%	±%
BJP	Patlya Langda Mavaskar	37,377	29.95%	New
BSP	Rajkumar Dayaram Patel	32,209	25.81%	▲22.14
Independent	Ramu Mhatang Patel	23,099	18.51%	New
INC	Tulshiram Rupna Kale	17,284	13.85%	▼27.81
JD	Buda Tepa Zarekar	6,350	5.09%	▼1.01
Independent	Ghanu Babu Sawarkar	3,015	2.42%	New
Independent	Ganesh Khanu Mavashi	1,867	1.50%	New
Margin of victory		5,168	4.14%	▼13.52
Turnout		132,854	70.64%	▲23.80
Total valid votes		124,789		
Registered electors		188,066		▲18.66
BJP gain from INC		Swing	▼11.71	

=== Assembly Election 1990 ===
1990 Maharashtra Legislative Assembly election : Melghat
Party	Candidate	Votes	%	±%
INC	Tulshiram Rupna Kale	28,098	41.66%	▼39.99
SS	Ramesh Raikwar	16,186	24.00%	New
Independent	Kisan Tane Kasdekar	6,826	10.12%	New
Independent	Patlya Guruji Mavaskar	5,761	8.54%	New
JD	Fulkai Buda Bhilavekar	4,110	6.09%	New
BSP	Mamta Tai Netam	2,476	3.67%	New
Independent	Dashrath Rajaram Shilaskar	1,177	1.75%	New
Margin of victory		11,912	17.66%	▼51.18
Turnout		69,775	44.02%	▲0.84
Total valid votes		67,439		
Registered electors		158,497		▲33.47
INC hold		Swing	▼39.99	

=== Assembly Election 1985 ===
1985 Maharashtra Legislative Assembly election : Melghat
Party	Candidate	Votes	%	±%
INC	Ramu Mhatang Patel	40,441	81.66%	New
BJP	Hiralal Onkar Sarage	6,348	12.82%	▲1.74
Independent	Maujilal Tumla	1,482	2.99%	New
Independent	Bhujang Ramji	1,254	2.53%	New
Margin of victory		34,093	68.84%	▲23.28
Turnout		51,368	43.26%	▼2.84
Total valid votes		49,525		
Registered electors		118,748		▲13.21
INC gain from INC(I)		Swing	▲14.41	

=== Assembly Election 1980 ===
1980 Maharashtra Legislative Assembly election : Melghat
Party	Candidate	Votes	%	±%
INC(I)	Narayan Nanu Patel	31,420	67.24%	▲6.16
Independent	Ramu Mhatang Patel	10,131	21.68%	New
BJP	Hiralal Onkar Sarage	5,174	11.07%	New
Margin of victory		21,289	45.56%	▲9.69
Turnout		48,503	46.24%	▼14.33
Total valid votes		46,725		
Registered electors		104,895		▲7.80
INC(I) hold		Swing	▲6.16	

=== Assembly Election 1978 ===
1978 Maharashtra Legislative Assembly election : Melghat
Party	Candidate	Votes	%	±%
INC(I)	Ramu Mhatang Patel	34,998	61.09%	New
JP	Hiralal Onkar Sarage	14,444	25.21%	New
INC	Mortiram Nanu Patel	7,849	13.70%	▼52.35
Margin of victory		20,554	35.88%	▲3.78
Turnout		60,633	62.31%	▲0.66
Total valid votes		57,291		
Registered electors		97,307		▲8.32
INC(I) gain from INC		Swing	▼4.96	

=== Assembly Election 1972 ===
1972 Maharashtra Legislative Assembly election : Melghat
Party	Candidate	Votes	%	±%
INC	Ramu Mhatang Patel	34,542	66.05%	▲10.99
Independent	Narayan Nanu Patel	17,756	33.95%	New
Margin of victory		16,786	32.10%	▲15.32
Turnout		55,530	61.82%	▲9.61
Total valid votes		52,298		
Registered electors		89,832		▲14.45
INC hold		Swing	▲10.99	

=== Assembly Election 1967 ===
1967 Maharashtra Legislative Assembly election : Melghat
Party	Candidate	Votes	%	±%
INC	Dayaram Nanu Patel	21,004	55.06%	▲10.47
RPI	S. Chinu	14,602	38.28%	New
ABJS	B. Amalya	2,544	6.67%	New
Margin of victory		6,402	16.78%	▲5.96
Turnout		41,756	53.20%	▼14.67
Total valid votes		38,150		
Registered electors		78,488		▼6.40
INC gain from Independent		Swing	▼0.35	

=== Assembly Election 1962 ===
1962 Maharashtra Legislative Assembly election : Melghat
Party	Candidate	Votes	%	±%
Independent	Mamraj Jagannath Khandelwal	29,403	55.41%	New
INC	Girjabai W/O Shanharrao Watane	23,661	44.59%	▼4.41
Margin of victory		5,742	10.82%	▼11.45
Turnout		57,164	68.17%	▲8.08
Total valid votes		53,064		
Registered electors		83,858		▲22.93
Independent gain from INC		Swing	▲6.41	

=== Assembly Election 1957 ===
1957 Bombay State Legislative Assembly election : Melghat
Party	Candidate	Votes	%	±%
INC	Gawande Kokilabai Jagannath	18,448	49.00%	▲13.62
Independent	Khandelwal Mamraj Jagannath	10,063	26.73%	New
PSP	Farkade Dadharao Laxmanrao	2,812	7.47%	New
Independent	Nandorkar Bhagwatrao Shioramji	2,641	7.01%	New
Independent	Shrivastava Mahadeoprasad Vinayakrao	1,378	3.66%	New
Independent	Jagannath Rasuddin	680	1.81%	New
Independent	Chaudhari Narayanrao Krishnaji	663	1.76%	New
Margin of victory		8,385	22.27%	▲9.81
Turnout		37,651	55.20%	▲6.65
Total valid votes		37,651		
Registered electors		68,214		▲35.15
INC hold		Swing	▲13.62	

=== Assembly Election 1952 ===
1952 Madhya Pradesh Legislative Assembly election : Melghat
Party	Candidate	Votes	%	±%
INC	Balkrishna Mulchand Bhandari	8,668	35.38%	New
Independent	Babu Bidu Olangrao	5,614	22.91%	New
Independent	Gangaram Raoji Bodkhe	4,817	19.66%	New
Independent	Mamraj Jagannath Khandelwal	1,879	7.67%	New
SCF	Jagannath Sitaram Akaite	1,076	4.39%	New
Independent	Trimbukrao Kashirao Ulhe	735	3.00%	New
CPI	Vithalpuri Lawangpuri	716	2.92%	New
Margin of victory		3,054	12.46%	
Turnout		24,502	48.55%	
Total valid votes		24,502		
Registered electors		50,471		
INC win (new seat)				

== See also ==
- Melghat
- Dharni, Amravati
