= Shahapur Assembly constituency =

Shahapur Assembly constituency may refer to:

- Shahapur, Karnataka Assembly constituency
- Shahapur, Maharashtra Assembly constituency
