= Vinayak Mete =

Indian politician (1970–2022)

Vinayakrao Mete
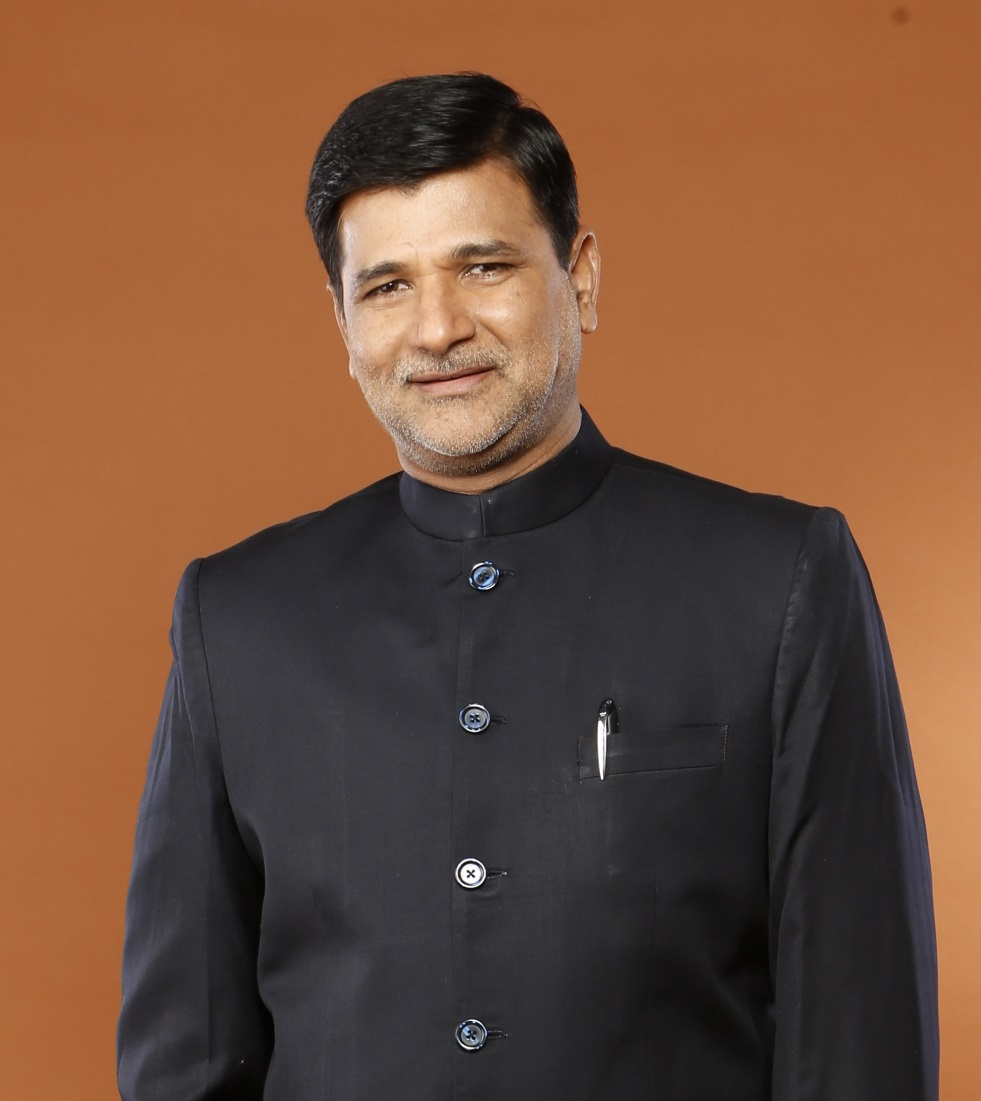

Member of Maharashtra Legislative Council
- In office (1996-2000), (2000-2006), (2010-2014), (2015-2016), (2016 – 2022)
- Constituency: elected by MLA's

Personal details
- Born: 30 June 1970 Rajegaon, Beed District, Maharashtra
- Died: 14 August 2022 (aged 52) Kamothe, Navi Mumbai, Maharashtra
- Party: Bharatiya Janata Party (2015-2022)
- Other political affiliations: Nationalist Congress Party (2000-2014); Shiv Sangram (2014-2015); Shiv Sena (Before 2000)
- Spouse: Dr. Jyoti Vinayak Mete

Vinayakrao Tukaram Mete (30 June 1970 – 14 August 2022) was an Indian politician from Rajegaon in Beed District, Maharashtra. He was a leader of Shiv Sangram.

== Career ==
Vinayak Mete was the president of Shiv Sangram. Vinayak Mete was elected to the Maharashtra Legislative Council unopposed from BJP quota on 3 June 2016. He was also a member of the Nationalist Congress Party until 2014.

He was candidate from the Bharatiya Janata Party in the 2014 Maharashtra Legislative Assembly election from the Beed Assembly constituency but lost to Jaydattaji Kshirsagar of the Nationalist Congress Party.

== Personal life and death ==
Vinayak Tukaram Mete was born on 30 June 1970 in Beed. He was married to Dr. Jyoti Mete.

Mete died from the injuries sustained in a car accident near Madap tunnel of Mumbai–Pune Expressway on 14 August 2022, at the only at the age of 52. He was declared dead upon arrival at the M.G.M. Hospital in Kamothe in Navi Mumbai.
