= Dhanare Paskal Janya =

Indian politician (died 2021)

Maharashtra Legislative Assembly
- In office 2014–2019
- Preceded by: Rajaram Ozare
- Succeeded by: Vinod Bhiva Nikole

Personal details
- Born: 1971 or 1972
- Died: 12 April 2021 (aged 49) Mumbai, Maharashtra, India
- Party: Bharatiya Janata Party
- Occupation: Politician
- Website: mahabjp.org

Dhanare Paskal Janya (1971/1972 – 12 April 2021) was an Indian politician and member of the Bharatiya Janata Party. He was a first term member of the Maharashtra Legislative Assembly.

Janya died in 2021 from COVID-19 on 12 April, aged 49.

== Constituency ==
Dhanare Paskal Janya was elected from the Dahanu constituency Maharashtra.

== Positions held ==
- Maharashtra Legislative Assembly MLA.
- Terms in office: 2014–2019.
