= Prabhudas Babulal Bhilawekar =

Indian politician

Prabhdas Bhilawekar

Member of Maharashtra Legislative Assembly
- In office 2014–2019
- Preceded by: Kewalram Kale
- Succeeded by: Rajkumar Patel
- Constituency: Melghat

Personal details
- Born: 20 January 1964 (age 62) Melghat, Maharashtra, India
- Party: Bharatiya Janata Party
- Spouse: Sumrati Bhilawekar
- Children: Anusha & Janvhi Bhilawekar (Daughter)
- Education: H.S.C
- Occupation: Politician

Prabhudas Babulal Bhilawekar is a member of the 13th Maharashtra Legislative Assembly. He represents the Melghat Assembly Constituency. He belongs to the Bharatiya Janata Party.

One of Bhilawekar's election promises was to personally look into issues each of the 425 villages in his constituency faced. It is reported that he had visited 70 of these villages in fulfilment of the same, in a couple of weeks since winning the election. Bhilawekar's appointment in June 2015, as member State Wildlife Board, has been criticised as a dilution of its pro-environment character.
