= Purandar Assembly constituency =

Constituency of the Maharashtra legislative assembly in India

Coordinates: 18.28°N 73.97°E

Purandar
- Constituency No. 202 for the Maharashtra Legislative Assembly

Constituency details
- Country: India
- Region: Western India
- State: Maharashtra
- District: Pune
- Lok Sabha constituency: Baramati
- Established: 1951
- Total electors: 464,651
- Reservation: None

Member of Legislative Assembly
- 15th Maharashtra Legislative Assembly
- Incumbent Vijay Shivtare
- Party: SHS
- Alliance: NDA
- Elected year: 2024

Purandar Assembly constituency is one of the 288 Vidhan Sabha (legislative assembly) constituencies of Maharashtra state, western India. This constituency is located in Pune district.

== Geographical scope ==
The constituency comprises Purandar taluka, parts of Hadapsar revenue circle such as Pisoli village (ward no 135 of Pune Municipal Corporation (PMC)), Undri village (ward no 136 of PMC), Ambegaon Budruk village (ward no 141 of PMC), Ambegaon Khurd village (ward no. 142 of PMC) and rest of the revenue circle excluding other areas under PMC.

== Members of the Legislative Assembly ==
Election	Member	Party
1952	Memane Madhaorao Narayanrao	Indian National Congress
1957	Pawar Raghunathrao Anandrao	Peasants and Workers Party of India
1962	Dayaneshwar Raghunath Khalre	Indian National Congress
1967	Dayaneshwar Raghunath Khalre	Indian National Congress
1972	Jadhavrao Jyotiyajirao	Samyukta Socialist Party
1978	Dada Jadhav	Janata Party
1980	Kunjir Sambhajirao Ramchandra	Indian National Congress
1985	Dada Jadhav	Janata Party
1990	Dada Jadhav	Janata Dal
1995	Dada Jadhav	Janata Dal
1999	Dada Jadhav	Janata Dal
2004	Ashok Kondiba Tekawade	Nationalist Congress Party
2009	Vijay Shivtare	Shiv Sena
2014	Vijay Shivtare	Shiv Sena
2019	Sanjay Chandukaka Jagtap	Indian National Congress
2024	Vijay Shivtare	Shiv Sena

== Election results ==
=== Assembly Election 2024 ===
2024 Maharashtra Legislative Assembly election : Purandar
Party	Candidate	Votes	%	±%
SS	Vijay Shivtare	125,819	44.44%	▲2.41
INC	Sanjay Chandukaka Jagtap	101,631	35.89%	▼19.44
NCP	Sambhaji Sadashiv (Anna) Zende. I. A. S	47,196	16.67%	New
MNS	Umesh Narayan Jagtap	2,920	1.03%	New
NOTA	None of the above	1,484	0.52%	▼0.25
Margin of victory		24,188	8.54%	▼4.75
Turnout		284,628	61.26%	▼4.56
Total valid votes		283,144		
Registered electors		464,651		▲28.30
SS gain from INC		Swing	▼10.89	

=== Assembly Election 2019 ===
2019 Maharashtra Legislative Assembly election : Purandar
Party	Candidate	Votes	%	±%
INC	Sanjay Chandukaka Jagtap	130,710	55.33%	▲20.28
SS	Vijay Shivtare	99,306	42.03%	▲2.90
VBA	Atul Mahadev Nagare	2,943	1.25%	New
NOTA	None of the above	1,808	0.77%	▲0.20
Margin of victory		31,404	13.29%	▲9.21
Turnout		238,376	65.82%	▼4.80
Total valid votes		236,253		
Registered electors		362,150		▲20.80
INC gain from SS		Swing	▲16.20	

=== Assembly Election 2014 ===
2014 Maharashtra Legislative Assembly election : Purandar
Party	Candidate	Votes	%	±%
SS	Vijay Shivtare	82,339	39.13%	▲0.70
INC	Sanjay Chandukaka Jagtap	73,749	35.05%	New
NCP	Ashok Kondiba Tekawade	28,067	13.34%	▼11.82
BJP	Rajenimbalkar Sangitadevi Sangramsinh	18,918	8.99%	New
Independent	Dagade Ganpat Shankar	2,298	1.09%	New
NOTA	None of the above	1,208	0.57%	New
Margin of victory		8,590	4.08%	▼9.18
Turnout		211,722	70.62%	▲4.93
Total valid votes		210,415		
Registered electors		299,803		▲11.24
SS hold		Swing	▲0.70	

=== Assembly Election 2009 ===
2009 Maharashtra Legislative Assembly election : Purandar
Party	Candidate	Votes	%	±%
SS	Vijay Shivtare	67,998	38.43%	▲17.28
NCP	Durgade Digambar Ganpat	44,529	25.16%	▼16.33
Independent	Sanjay Chandukaka Jagtap	33,513	18.94%	New
JD(S)	Dada Jadhav	14,050	7.94%	New
MNS	Krushna Haribhau Lohokare	11,180	6.32%	New
Independent	Dada Jadhav	1,954	1.10%	New
Independent	Vijay (Bapu) Dnyanoba Harpale	1,564	0.88%	New
BSP	Gaikwad Shrimant Rudrappa	1,427	0.81%	▼0.31
Margin of victory		23,469	13.26%	▼7.08
Turnout		177,051	65.69%	▲0.29
Total valid votes		176,957		
Registered electors		269,509		▲16.05
SS gain from NCP		Swing	▼3.06	

=== Assembly Election 2004 ===
2004 Maharashtra Legislative Assembly election : Purandar
Party	Candidate	Votes	%	±%
NCP	Ashok Kondiba Tekawade	63,011	41.49%	New
SS	Ashok Kashinath Kalbhor	32,114	21.15%	▲14.64
Independent	Dada Jadhav	2,503	1.65%	New
Independent	G. M. Memane	1,873	1.23%	New
BSP	Londhe Gautam Yashwant	1,703	1.12%	New
Shivrajya Party	Khengare Mahadev Sahebrao	1,111	0.73%	New
Margin of victory		30,897	20.34%	▲6.45
Turnout		151,888	65.40%	▲0.08
Total valid votes		151,866		
Registered electors		232,231		▲21.09
NCP gain from JD(S)		Swing	▲2.86	

=== Assembly Election 1999 ===
1999 Maharashtra Legislative Assembly election : Purandar
Party	Candidate	Votes	%	±%
JD(S)	Dada Jadhav	44,250	38.63%	New
INC	Chandukaka Jagtap	28,339	24.74%	▼8.53
Independent	Ingale Sudamrao Kondiba	19,574	17.09%	New
Independent	Shinde Dhananjay Tukaram	9,560	8.35%	New
SS	Rambhau Zagade	7,456	6.51%	▲5.30
Independent	Sanjay Dnyandeo Jagtap	1,697	1.48%	New
Independent	Dada Jadhav	1,415	1.24%	New
Independent	Walhekar Krishnaji Punaji	991	0.87%	New
Margin of victory		15,911	13.89%	▼16.86
Turnout		125,278	65.32%	▼12.27
Total valid votes		114,545		
Registered electors		191,791		▲2.16
JD(S) gain from JD		Swing	▼25.39	

=== Assembly Election 1995 ===
1995 Maharashtra Legislative Assembly election : Purandar
Party	Candidate	Votes	%	±%
JD	Dada Jadhav	90,321	64.02%	▲14.65
INC	Chandukaka Jagtap	46,935	33.27%	▼12.77
SS	Popat Theurkar	1,707	1.21%	▼1.35
Independent	Chavan Sandip Maruti	1,003	0.71%	New
Margin of victory		43,386	30.75%	▲27.42
Turnout		145,670	77.59%	▲13.35
Total valid votes		141,092		
Registered electors		187,740		▲3.56
JD hold		Swing	▲14.65	

=== Assembly Election 1990 ===
1990 Maharashtra Legislative Assembly election : Purandar
Party	Candidate	Votes	%	±%
JD	Dada Jadhav	56,421	49.37%	New
INC	Kolate Vijay Vinayak	52,621	46.04%	▲11.54
SS	Jagtap Madhavrao Shamrao	2,928	2.56%	New
Independent	Appa Alias Harishchandra Soranrao Saste	1,728	1.51%	New
Margin of victory		3,800	3.33%	▼19.90
Turnout		116,448	64.24%	▲4.60
Total valid votes		114,283		
Registered electors		181,279		▲30.98
JD gain from JP		Swing	▼8.37	

=== Assembly Election 1985 ===
1985 Maharashtra Legislative Assembly election : Purandar
Party	Candidate	Votes	%	±%
JP	Dada Jadhav	46,712	57.74%	New
INC	Saste Harishandra Sopanrao	27,916	34.50%	New
Independent	Salunkhe Vilasrao Balwant	3,714	4.59%	New
Independent	Badekar Bhujang Waman	1,403	1.73%	New
Independent	Dhavale Daulat Vishnu	800	0.99%	New
Margin of victory		18,796	23.23%	▲22.10
Turnout		82,536	59.64%	▲6.98
Total valid votes		80,907		
Registered electors		138,397		▲10.13
JP gain from INC(U)		Swing	▲20.63	

=== Assembly Election 1980 ===
1980 Maharashtra Legislative Assembly election : Purandar
Party	Candidate	Votes	%	±%
INC(U)	Kunjir Sambhajirao Ramchandra	23,901	37.11%	New
JP	Dada Jadhav	23,175	35.98%	New
INC(I)	Raut Madhukarrao Baburao	16,948	26.31%	▲25.28
Margin of victory		726	1.13%	▼2.58
Turnout		66,179	52.66%	▼13.93
Total valid votes		64,410		
Registered electors		125,669		▲8.14
INC(U) gain from JP		Swing	▼9.58	

=== Assembly Election 1978 ===
1978 Maharashtra Legislative Assembly election : Purandar
Party	Candidate	Votes	%	±%
JP	Dada Jadhav	35,053	46.69%	New
INC	Usral Shankarrao Dashrathrao	32,267	42.97%	▲1.80
PWPI	Chaudhary Khanderao Daulatrao	5,530	7.37%	New
Independent	Eknath Bapuji Ranpise	1,354	1.80%	New
INC(I)	Jagtap Bhikoba Narayan	773	1.03%	New
Margin of victory		2,786	3.71%	▼12.13
Turnout		77,383	66.59%	▲2.34
Total valid votes		75,084		
Registered electors		116,206		▲38.73
JP gain from SSP		Swing	▼10.31	

=== Assembly Election 1972 ===
1972 Maharashtra Legislative Assembly election : Purandar
Party	Candidate	Votes	%	±%
SSP	Jadhavrao Jyotiyajirao	29,586	57.00%	New
INC	Dayaneshwar Raghunath Khalre	21,367	41.17%	▼14.47
Independent	Vithal K. Takawale	715	1.38%	New
Margin of victory		8,219	15.84%	▼2.89
Turnout		53,821	64.25%	▲5.08
Total valid votes		51,903		
Registered electors		83,762		▼2.17
SSP gain from INC		Swing	▲1.36	

=== Assembly Election 1967 ===
1967 Maharashtra Legislative Assembly election : Purandar
Party	Candidate	Votes	%	±%
INC	Dayaneshwar Raghunath Khalre	26,841	55.64%	▲15.77
SSP	Vithal Sauloba Deshmukh	17,805	36.91%	New
PSP	K. P. Kadam	3,593	7.45%	▼11.60
Margin of victory		9,036	18.73%	▲2.83
Turnout		50,662	59.17%	▼1.56
Total valid votes		48,239		
Registered electors		85,622		▲38.86
INC hold		Swing	▲15.77	

=== Assembly Election 1962 ===
1962 Maharashtra Legislative Assembly election : Purandar
Party	Candidate	Votes	%	±%
INC	Dayaneshwar Raghunath Khalre	13,911	39.87%	▲4.39
Independent	Vithal Sauloba Deshmukh	8,361	23.96%	New
PSP	Laxman Ganp[at Pawar	6,648	19.05%	New
Independent	Dhagoba Sawlaram Bhujbal	3,371	9.66%	New
PWPI	Raghunath Anandrao Pawar	1,951	5.59%	▼58.93
ABJS	Govind Gyanba Kolte	653	1.87%	New
Margin of victory		5,550	15.90%	▼13.14
Turnout		37,448	60.73%	▲7.80
Total valid votes		34,895		
Registered electors		61,662		▲13.75
INC gain from PWPI		Swing	▼24.65	

=== Assembly Election 1957 ===
1957 Bombay State Legislative Assembly election : Purandar
Party	Candidate	Votes	%	±%
PWPI	Pawar Raghunathrao Anandrao	18,513	64.52%	▲49.54
INC	Khade Mhalsakat Gopal	10,181	35.48%	▼26.99
Margin of victory		8,332	29.04%	▼15.09
Turnout		28,694	52.93%	▲6.07
Total valid votes		28,694		
Registered electors		54,207		▲0.20
PWPI gain from INC		Swing	▲2.05	

=== Assembly Election 1952 ===
1952 Bombay State Legislative Assembly election : Purandar
Party	Candidate	Votes	%	±%
INC	Memane Madhaorao Narayanrao	15,836	62.47%	New
Socialist	Raut Raghunath Janardan	4,648	18.33%	New
PWPI	Jadhav Dhyanoba Maskuji	3,798	14.98%	New
Independent	Jagtap Nanasaheb Narayan	1,069	4.22%	New
Margin of victory		11,188	44.13%	
Turnout		25,351	46.86%	
Total valid votes		25,351		
Registered electors		54,098		
INC win (new seat)				
