= Sanjay Jagtap =

Indian politician

Member of Maharashtra Legislative Assembly
- In office 2019–2024
- Preceded by: Vijay Shivtare
- Succeeded by: Vijay Shivtare
- Constituency: Purandar Assembly constituency

Personal details
- Party: Bhartiya Janta Party 2025 Indian National Congress 2009- 2025
- Occupation: Politician

Sanjay Chandukaka Jagtap is a leader of BJP and Former member of the Maharashtra Legislative Assembly elected from Purandar Assembly constituency in Pune city.

== Positions held ==
- 2019: Elected to Maharashtra Legislative Assembly.
