= Shiv Sangram =

- Leader: Vinayak Mete
- Alliance: National Democratic Alliance

Shiv Sangram is a Marathi organization led by Vinayak Mete. It is a part of the Bharatiya Janata Party-led National Democratic Alliance, and fielded its candidates on four seats in the 2014 Maharashtra Legislative Assembly election; the candidates fought on the BJP symbol.
