= Kewalram Tulsiram Kale =

Indian politician

Member of the Maharashtra Legislative Assembly
- In office 2009 – 2014 (2024-Present)
- Preceded by: Rajkumar Patel
- Constituency: Melghat

Personal details
- Party: Bharatiya Janata Party
- Other political affiliations: Nationalist Congress Party; Indian National Congress
- Profession: Politician

Kewalram Tulsiram Kale is an Indian politician from Maharashtra. He is a member of the Maharashtra Legislative Assembly from 2024, representing Melghat Assembly constituency as a member of the Bharatiya Janata Party.

== See also ==
- List of chief ministers of Maharashtra
- Maharashtra Legislative Assembly
