= Rajkumar Dayaram Patel =

Indian politician

Rajkumar Patel

Member of Maharashtra Vidhan Sabha
- In office 24 October 2019 – 24 November 2024
- Preceded by: Prabhudas Bhilawekar
- Succeeded by: Kewalram Kale
- Constituency: Melghat

Personal details
- Party: Prahar Janshakti Party

Rajkumar S/o. Dayaram Patel is an Indian politician in the Prahar Janshakti Party. He was elected as a member of the Maharashtra Legislative Assembly from Melghat on 24 October 2019. Three time MLA (Member of Legislative Assembly), elected from the tribal Korku community from the Melghat Region, he is one of the most popular leaders of the district, known for his direct action plan with the Forest Department and Local Administration. He is the son of the late MLA from same Constituency Shri. Dayaram Patel, (Senior Congress leader & Cabinet Minister For Forest State) for 2nd Vidhan Sabha 1967 of Maharashtra. He entered into politics after his graduation from Amravati University and contested his first MLA election in 1995 on a BSP ticket and lost by a very small margin. He ran again in the 1999 contested election on a BJP ticket and won with a high vote difference defending senior Congress Leader late Ramu Patel, and had another victory in 2004. He lost twice consecutively in 2009 and 2014. Highly involved in public activities and social welfare, people gave him another chance in 2019, where he got his highest victory ever, won by 50,000 votes on a Prahar Janshakti Party ticket.
