= Krushna Ghoda =

Indian politician

Member of Legislative Assembly of Maharashtra
- In office October 2014 – May 2015
- Preceded by: Shankar Nam
- Succeeded by: Rajaram Ozare
- Constituency: Palghar

Personal details
- Party: Shiv Sena
- Relations: Amit Ghoda (son)

Krushna Arjun Ghoda (1953 or 1954 – 24 May 2015) was an Indian politician and member of the 13th Maharashtra Legislative Assembly. He represented the Palghar Assembly Constituency as member of Shiv Sena. He was a Shiv Sena politician from Palghar district, Maharashtra. He had also represented Dahanu Vidhan Sabha constituency in 1999 and 2004.

He died on 24 May 2015 due to a massive cardiac arrest.

== Positions held ==
- 1999: Elected to Maharashtra Legislative Assembly (1st term)
- 2004: Re-Elected to Maharashtra Legislative Assembly (2nd term)
- 2014: Re-Elected to Maharashtra Legislative Assembly (3rd term)
- 2015: Elected as vice chairman of Thane District Central Co-operative Bank

== See also ==
- Palghar Lok Sabha constituency
