= Vinod Nikole =

Indian politician

Vinod Bhiva Nikole

Member of the Maharashtra Legislative Assembly
- Incumbent
- Assumed office 24 October 2019
- Constituency: Dahanu

Personal details
- Party: Communist Party of India (Marxist)

Vinod Nikole (15 September 1975) is an Indian politician and member of the 14th & 15th state Maharashtra Legislative Assembly. He represents the Dahanu constituency as member of Communist Party of India (Marxist).
