= Shahapur, Maharashtra Assembly constituency =

Constituency of the Maharashtra legislative assembly in India

Coordinates: 19°27′11.15″N 73°18′17.19″E

Shahpur Assembly constituency
- Constituency No. 135 for the Maharashtra Legislative Assembly

Constituency details
- Country: India
- Region: Western India
- State: Maharashtra
- Division: Konkan
- District: Thane
- Lok Sabha constituency: Bhiwandi
- Established: 1967
- Total electors: 291,096
- Reservation: ST

Member of Legislative Assembly
- 15th Maharashtra Legislative Assembly
- Incumbent Daulat Daroda
- Party: NCP
- Alliance: NDA
- Elected year: 2024

Shahapur Assembly constituency is one of the twenty-four constituencies of the Maharashtra Vidhan Sabha located in Thane district. It is reserved for ST candidates. There is a Shahapur Assembly constituency in Karnataka as well.

It is a part of Bhiwandi Lok Sabha constituency (ST) along with five other assembly constituencies, viz Bhiwandi Rural (ST), Bhiwandi East, Bhiwadi West, Kalyan West and Murbad.

== List of Members of Legislative Assembly ==
Year	Member	Party
1967	P. R. Patil	Independent
1972	Shrirang Shinge	Indian National Congress
1978	Krishnakant Telam	Peasants and Workers Party of India
1980	Mahadu Barora	Indian National Congress (U)
1985	Mahadu Barora	Indian Congress (Socialist)
1990	Mahadu Barora	Indian National Congress
1995	Daulat Daroda	Shiv Sena
1999	Daulat Daroda	Shiv Sena
2004	Mahadu Barora	Nationalist Congress Party
2009	Daulat Daroda	Shiv Sena
2014	Pandurang Barora	Nationalist Congress Party
2019	Daulat Daroda	Nationalist Congress Party
2024	Daulat Daroda	Nationalist Congress Party

== Election results ==
=== Assembly Election 2024 ===
2024 Maharashtra Legislative Assembly election : Shahapur
Party	Candidate	Votes	%	±%
NCP	Daulat Bhika Daroda	73,081	36.20	New
NCP-SP	Barora Pandurang Mahadu	71,409	35.37	New
Independent	Ranjana Kaluram Ughada	42,776	21.19	New
MNS	Harishchandra (Harry) Bango Khandvi	5,648	2.80	New
NOTA	None of the Above	4,872	2.41	▼0.32
Independent	Rama Balu Shende Alias Rupali Ravikant Araj	3,892	1.93	New
BSP	Yashwant Gopal Wakh	2,202	1.09	▲0.01
Independent	Gaurav Prakash Raje	1,460	0.72	New
Margin of victory		1,672	0.83	▼8.75
Turnout		206,772	71.03	▲6.13
Total valid votes		201,900		
Registered electors		291,096		
NCP hold		Swing	▼12.05	

=== Assembly Election 2019 ===
2019 Maharashtra Legislative Assembly election : Shahapur
Party	Candidate	Votes	%	±%
NCP	Daulat Bhika Daroda	76,053	48.24	▲10.76
SS	Barora Pandurang Mahadu	60,949	38.66	▲4.84
CPI(M)	Krushna Chintu Bhavar	10,361	6.57	▲4.23
VBA	Harishchandra (Haresh) Bango Khandavi	5,671	3.60	New
NOTA	None of the Above	4,313	2.74	▲0.65
Independent	Jagdish Govind Gira	1,816	1.15	New
BSP	Ravindra Mangalu Marade	1,710	1.08	▼0.68
Bhartiya Tribal Party	Vishnu Budha Thombre	1,082	0.69	New
Margin of victory		15,104	9.58	▲5.92
Turnout		162,046		▼1.19
Total valid votes		157,642		
Registered electors		249,313		
NCP hold		Swing	▲10.76	

=== Assembly Election 2014 ===
2014 Maharashtra Legislative Assembly election : Shahapur
Party	Candidate	Votes	%	±%
NCP	Barora Pandurang Mahadu	56,813	37.48	▲5.51
SS	Daulat Bhika Daroda	51,269	33.82	▼6.66
BJP	Ashok Mhalu Irnak	18,246	12.04	New
INC	Padmakar Namdev Kewari	6,688	4.41	New
MNS	Dyaneshwar Nivrutti Talpade	6,579	4.34	▼7.76
CPI(M)	Tandel Suresh Bhikal	3,553	2.34	▼0.61
NOTA	None of the Above	3,159	2.08	New
BSP	Mahadu Kalu Ghute	2,677	1.77	New
Margin of victory		5,544	3.66	▼4.86
Turnout		154,789		▼0.56
Total valid votes		151,579		
Registered electors		235,303		
NCP gain from SS		Swing	▼3.00	

=== Assembly Election 2009 ===
2009 Maharashtra Legislative Assembly election : Shahapur
Party	Candidate	Votes	%	±%
SS	Daulat Bhika Daroda	58,334	40.48	▲6.40
NCP	Barora Pandurang Mahadu	46,065	31.97	▼7.34
MNS	Dnyaneshwar Nivrutti Talpade	17,438	12.10	New
CPI(M)	Roj Sitaram Dhaklya	4,263	2.96	New
Independent	Vijay Dattatrai Pilkar	3,868	2.68	New
Independent	Prakash Dharama Veer	3,046	2.11	New
Independent	Padmakar Namdev Kewari	2,864	1.99	New
Margin of victory		12,269	8.51	▲3.29
Turnout		144,141	65.01	▼3.52
Total valid votes		144,090		
Registered electors		221,737		▲24.65
SS gain from NCP		Swing	▲1.18	

=== Assembly Election 2004 ===
2004 Maharashtra Legislative Assembly election : Shahapur
Party	Candidate	Votes	%	±%
NCP	Mahadu Nago Barora	47,895	39.30	▲8.49
SS	Daulat Bhika Daroda	41,534	34.08	▼2.14
Independent	Talpade Dnyaneshwar Nivrutti	19,101	15.68	New
BSP	Kewari Ramchandra Kamalu	4,303	3.53	New
Independent	Shashikant Kashinath Patekar	3,830	3.14	New
BBM	Chandkrant Bhau Shinde	2,778	2.28	New
Independent	Ravaji Lahu Bhoye	2,414	1.98	New
Margin of victory		6,361	5.22	▼0.18
Turnout		121,860	68.50	▲17.50
Total valid votes		121,855		
Registered electors		177,892		▲12.20
NCP gain from SS		Swing	▲3.08	

=== Assembly Election 1999 ===
1999 Maharashtra Legislative Assembly election : Shahapur
Party	Candidate	Votes	%	±%
SS	Daulat Bhika Daroda	29,293	36.22	▼16.26
NCP	Mahadu Nago Barora	24,923	30.82	New
INC	Kewari Padmakar Namdeo	16,132	19.95	▼11.19
CPI(M)	Kama Dharma Tabale	8,304	10.27	New
Independent	Rajabhau Alias Yogiraj Murlidhar Bhoir	728	0.90	New
Independent	Nikhade Devram Ananta	679	0.84	New
Independent	Pardhi Ramachandra Nago	589	0.73	New
Margin of victory		4,370	5.40	▼15.93
Turnout		89,873	56.68	▼15.90
Total valid votes		80,869		
Registered electors		158,554		▲6.16
SS hold		Swing	▼16.26	

=== Assembly Election 1995 ===
1995 Maharashtra Legislative Assembly election : Shahapur
Party	Candidate	Votes	%	±%
SS	Daulat Bhika Daroda	52,441	52.48	▲3.70
INC	Mahadu Nago Barora	31,119	31.14	▼17.80
PWPI	Balu Patil	7,901	7.91	▲6.08
Independent	Dipak Babu Bhangale	5,231	5.23	New
Independent	Paradhi Ramchandra Nago	3,235	3.24	New
Margin of victory		21,322	21.34	▲21.17
Turnout		104,619	70.05	▲11.18
Total valid votes		99,927		
Registered electors		149,355		▲16.38
SS gain from INC		Swing	▲3.54	

=== Assembly Election 1990 ===
1990 Maharashtra Legislative Assembly election : Shahapur
Party	Candidate	Votes	%	±%
INC	Mahadu Nago Barora	34,998	48.94	▲14.40
SS	Padmakar Namdeo Kewhari	34,880	48.78	New
PWPI	Sawant Bhikaji Rama	1,305	1.82	New
Margin of victory		118	0.17	▼17.80
Turnout		73,551	57.31	▲9.61
Total valid votes		71,511		
Registered electors		128,336		▲20.84
INC gain from IC(S)		Swing	▼3.57	

=== Assembly Election 1985 ===
1985 Maharashtra Legislative Assembly election : Shahapur
Party	Candidate	Votes	%	±%
IC(S)	Mahadu Nago Barora	25,711	52.51	New
INC	Patil Devidas Pandurang	16,914	34.54	New
Independent	Jadhav Chandrakant Lahu	4,029	8.23	New
Independent	Pawar Suresh Bhagwan	1,893	3.87	New
Margin of victory		8,797	17.97	▲12.46
Turnout		50,617	47.66	▲13.56
Total valid votes		48,966		
Registered electors		106,200		▲7.04
IC(S) gain from INC(U)		Swing	▲8.67	

=== Assembly Election 1980 ===
1980 Maharashtra Legislative Assembly election : Shahapur
Party	Candidate	Votes	%	±%
INC(U)	Mahadu Nago Barora	14,156	43.84	New
INC(I)	Mule Parshuram Mohaniraj	12,378	38.33	New
BJP	Khande Shankr Balu	4,422	13.69	New
Independent	Gawari Jagannath Shankar	1,337	4.14	New
Margin of victory		1,778	5.51	▲1.53
Turnout		33,245	33.51	▼12.28
Total valid votes		32,293		
Registered electors		99,219		▲6.80
INC(U) gain from PWPI		Swing	▼6.15	

=== Assembly Election 1978 ===
1978 Maharashtra Legislative Assembly election : Shahapur
Party	Candidate	Votes	%	±%
PWPI	Telam Krishnakant Ramachandra	20,817	49.98	New
INC	Patil Balu Mahadu	19,162	46.01	▼20.49
Independent	Jadhav Chandrakant Lahu	1,669	4.01	New
Margin of victory		1,655	3.97	▼34.30
Turnout		43,091	46.38	▲1.48
Total valid votes		41,648		
Registered electors		92,901		▲3.08
PWPI gain from INC		Swing	▼16.52	

=== Assembly Election 1972 ===
1972 Maharashtra Legislative Assembly election : Shahapur
Party	Candidate	Votes	%	±%
INC	Shrirang Rama Shinge	25,983	66.50	▲26.19
Independent	Yashwant Gunaji Amekar	11,028	28.22	New
ABJS	Hiralal Mohiniraj Mule	2,062	5.28	▼11.89
Margin of victory		14,955	38.27	▲36.05
Turnout		40,605	45.05	▼6.95
Total valid votes		39,073		
Registered electors		90,124		▲19.76
INC gain from Independent		Swing	▲23.97	

=== Assembly Election 1967 ===
1967 Maharashtra Legislative Assembly election : Shahapur
Party	Candidate	Votes	%	±%
Independent	P. R. Patil	16,101	42.53	New
INC	D. J. Songal	15,259	40.30	New
ABJS	L. J. Viharkar	6,499	17.17	New
Margin of victory		842	2.22	
Turnout		41,215	54.77	
Total valid votes		37,859		
Registered electors		75,253		
Independent win (new seat)				

== See also ==
Shahpur (disambiguation)
