= Rajaram Ozare =

Indian politician (born 1975)

Member of Legislative Assembly of Maharashtra
- In office October 2009 – October 2014
- Preceded by: Krushna Ghoda
- Succeeded by: Dhanare Paskal Janya
- Constituency: Dahanu

Personal details
- Party: Communist Party of India (Marxist)

Rajaram Ozare (15 September 1975) is an Indian politician and member of the 12th state Maharashtra Legislative Assembly. He represented the Dahanu constituency as member of Communist Party of India (Marxist).

2009 Maharashtra Legislative Assembly election: Dahanu
Party	Candidate	Votes	%	±%
CPI(M)	Rajaram Ozare	62,530	47.28	+37.79
NCP	Krishna Ghoda	46,350	35.05	−14.77
SS	Ishwar Dhodi	17,955	13.58	−19.20
BSP	Vinod Shinda	5,412	4.09	+1.18
Majority		16,180	12.23	−4.81
Turnout		1,32,247	57.71	+2.84
CPI(M) gain from NCP		Swing	+26.28	
