= Daulat Daroda =

Indian politician

- दौलत दरोडा

Member of the Maharashtra Legislative Assembly
- Incumbent
- Assumed office 2019
- Preceded by: Pandurang Barora
- Constituency: Shahapur
- In office 2009–2014
- Preceded by: Mahadu Barora
- Succeeded by: Pandurang Barora
- Constituency: Shahapur
- In office 1995–2004
- Preceded by: Mahadu Barora
- Succeeded by: Mahadu Barora
- Constituency: Shahapur

Personal details
- Born: 01/06/1968
- Party: Nationalist Congress Party (2019-Present)
- Other political affiliations: Shiv Sena (1995-2019)

Daulat Bhika Daroda (Marathi: दौलत दरोडा) is an Indian politician and MLA of Maharashtra Legislative Assembly. He was reelected in 2019 and 2024 from the Shahapur Vidhan Sabha constituency in Thane district.

== Positions held ==
- 1995: Elected to Maharashtra Legislative Assembly
- 1999: Elected to Maharashtra Legislative Assembly
- 2009: Elected to Maharashtra Legislative Assembly
- 2019: Elected to Maharashtra Legislative Assembly
- 2024: Elected to Maharashtra Legislative Assembly
