= National Bahujan Congress =

Indian political party

The National Bahujan Congress is a political party in India, founded on 15 November 2008 as Yogendra Makwana (a former Union Minister and Dalit leader) broke away from the Indian National Congress.
