= Pandurang Barora =

Indian politician

- पांडुरंग बरोरा

Member of Legislative Assembly of Maharashtra
- In office 2014–2019
- Preceded by: Daulat Daroda
- Succeeded by: Daulat Daroda
- Constituency: Shahapur

Personal details
- Party: Shiv Sena (2019-present)
- Other political affiliations: Nationalist Congress Party (until 2019)

Pandurang Barora (Marathi: पांडुरंग बरोरा) is an Indian politician and member of the Shiv Sena. He was elected to Maharashtra Legislative Assembly in 2014 from the Shahapur Vidhan Sabha constituency in Thane district.

== Positions held ==
- 2014: Elected to Maharashtra Legislative Assembly
