= Vijay Shivtare =

Indian politician

The Honourable Vijay Shivtare

Member of the Maharashtra Legislative Assembly
- Incumbent
- Assumed office 2024
- Governor: Acharya Devvrat
- Constituency: Purandar

Minister of State for Water Resources and Water Conservation Government of Maharashtra
- In office 5 December 2014 – 24 Oct 2019

Member of the Maharashtra Legislative Assembly
- In office 2014–2019
- Constituency: Purandar

Personal details
- Born: 24 December 1959 (age 66) Purandar
- Party: Shiv Sena (2022-present)
- Spouse: Mandakini Shivtare
- Children: Vinay Shivtare Dr.Mamta Shivtare-Lande Vinas Shivtare
- Occupation: Politician
- Website: vijayshivtare.com

Vijay Shivtare, also called "Bapu", is an Indian politician belonging to Shiv Sena, and a member of the Maharashtra Legislative Assembly as of December 2024. He was elected from the Purandar Assembly Constituency in 2009, then 2014, then lost 2019 election, and then re-elected in 2024. In November, 2014, he was appointed party spokesman by the Shiv Sena. He was appointed Maharashtra's minister of state in December, 2014. He was given the water resources, water conservation portfolio. He was also given responsibility of being guardian minister of Satara district.

== Positions held ==
- 2009: Elected to Maharashtra Legislative Assembly (1st term)
- 2014: Re-Elected to Maharashtra Legislative Assembly (2nd term)
- 2014: Minister of State for Water Resources and Water Conservation in Maharashtra State Government
- 2014: Guardian minister of Satara district
- 2024: Elected to Maharashtra Legislative Assembly

== See also ==
- Devendra Fadnavis ministry

Political offices
Preceded by	Minister of State for Water Resources and Water Conservation; Maharashtra State; December 2014–present	Incumbent
Preceded by	Maharashtra State Guardian Minister for Satara district December 2014–present	Incumbent
