= Ambedkarite Party of India =

Political party, formed 2013

- Abbreviation: API
- President: Vijay Mankar
- Founded: April 14, 2013; 13 years ago
- Headquarters: Nagpur
- Ideology: Ambedkarism

The Ambedkarite Party of India is a political party in India based on the ideas of B. R. Ambedkar. The API was founded on April 14, 2013, and has its headquarters in Nagpur. Vijay Mankar is the national president.

The API fielded 34 candidates in the 2014 Indian general election, who together received 185,095 votes (0.03% of the nationwide vote). It contested 5 seats in the 2016 Kerala Assembly election and one in the 2017 Goa Assembly election. The party participates in alliances such as the Purogami Lokshahi Aghadi for the 2017 Nashik municipal elections.
