= 2014 Indian general election in Maharashtra =

Indian general election, 2014 in Maharashtra
- 10, 17, and 24 April 2014

All 48 constituencies from Maharashtra to the Lok Sabha
- Turnout: 60.32% (▲9.59%)
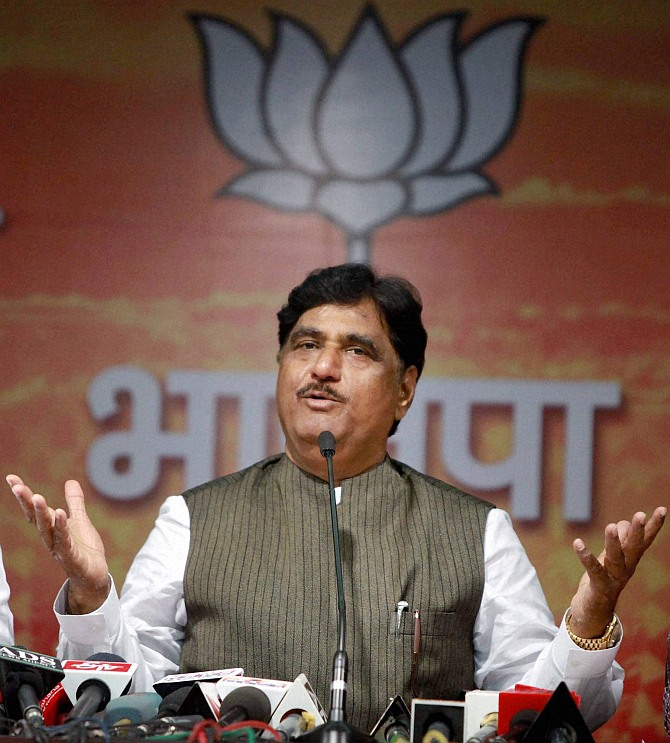

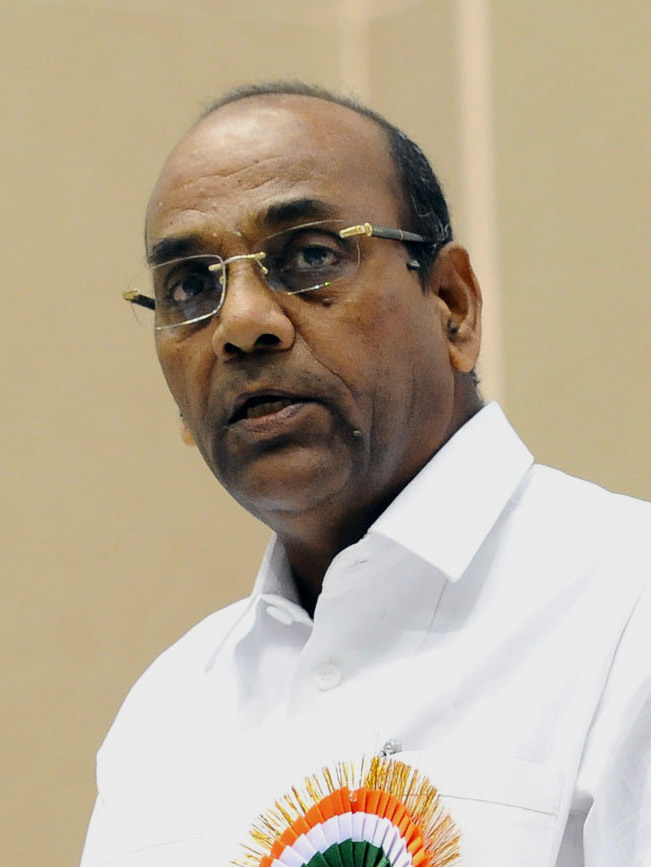

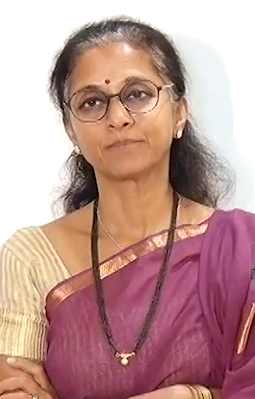

	Majority party	Minority party
Leader	Gopinath Munde	Anant Geete
Party	BJP	SS
Alliance	NDA	NDA
Leader's seat	Beed (won)	Raigad (won)
Last election	9	11
Seats won	23	18
Seat change	▲14	▲7
	Third party	Fourth party
Leader	Supriya Sule	Ashok Chavan
Party	NCP	INC
Alliance	UPA	UPA
Leader's seat	Baramati (won)	Nanded (won)
Last election	8	17
Seats won	4	2
Seat change	▼4	▼15
- Seatwise result map of the 2014 general election in Maharashtra
Prime Minister before election
Manmohan Singh
INC
Prime Minister after election
Narendra Modi
BJP

The 2014 Indian general election in Maharashtra was held in three phases on 10, 17 and 24 April 2014.

These were held for 48 seats with the state going to polls in the first three phases of the general elections. The major contenders in the state were the United Progressive Alliance (UPA) and National Democratic Alliance (NDA). UPA consisted of the Indian National Congress and the Nationalist Congress Party whereas the NDA consisted of the Bharatiya Janata Party and the Shiv Sena. The Shiv Sena contested on 20 seats in the state and the BJP over 24 seats. Similarly, the NCP contested on 21 seats and the Indian National Congress contested on 26 seats.

== Parties and alliances ==
=== National Democratic Alliance ===
Party	Flag	Symbol	Leader	Seats contested
Bharatiya Janata Party			Gopinath Munde	24
Shiv Sena			Anant Geete	20
Swabhimani Paksha			Raju Shetti	2
Republican Party of India (Athawale)			Ramdas Athawale	1
Rashtriya Samaj Paksha			Mahadev Jankar	1
Total				48

=== United Progressive Alliance ===
Party	Flag	Symbol	Leader	Seats contested
Indian National Congress			Ashok Chavan	26
Nationalist Congress Party			Supriya Sule	21
Bahujan Vikas Aaghadi			Hitendra Thakur	1
Total				48

== Results ==
=== Results by Party/Alliance ===
Alliance/ Party		Popular vote			Seats		
Alliance/ Party		Votes	%	±pp	Contested	Won	+/−
NDA	BJP	1,33,08,961	27.32	▲8.61	24	23	▲14
NDA	SHS	1,00,50,652	20.63	▲3.63	20	18	▲7
NDA	SWP	11,05,073	2.27	▲0.97	2	1	Steady
NDA	RSPS	4,51,843	0.93	Steady	1	0	Steady
NDA	RPI(A)	71,808	0.15	▼0.46	1	0	Steady
NDA	Total	2,49,88,337	51.29	▲15.20	48	42	▲21
UPA	INC	88,30,190	18.13	▼1.48	26	4	▼4
UPA	NCP	77,82,275	15.97	▼3.31	21	2	▼15
UPA	BVA	2,93,681	0.60	Steady	1	0	▼1
UPA	Total	1,69,06,146	34.70	▼5.48	48	6	▼19
BSP		12,71,680	2.61	▼2.22	48	0	Steady
AAP		10,88,997	2.24	New entry	48	0	Steady
MNS		7,08,010	1.45	▼2.62	10	0	Steady
PWPI		4,97,721	1.02		3	0	
BBM		3,60,854	0.74	▼0.59	23	0	Steady
CPI(M)		1,81,629	0.37		4	0	
Others		7,03,760	1.44	Steady	221	0	Steady
IND		15,77,114	3.24		444	0	▼1
NOTA		4,33,171	0.89	New entry			
Total		4,87,17,419	100%	-	897	48	-

== Candidates ==
=== List of Candidates ===
Constituency		NDA		UPA	
#	Name	Party	Candidate	Party	Candidate
1	Nandurbar (ST)	BJP	Heena Gavit	INC	Manikrao Hodlya Gavit
2	Dhule	BJP	Subhash Bhamre	INC	Amrish Patel
3	Jalgaon	BJP	A. T. Patil	NCP	Satish Bhaskarrao Patil
4	Raver	BJP	Raksha Khadse	NCP	Manishdada Jain
5	Buldhana	SS	Prataprao Jadhav	NCP	Ingle K. Ganpatrao
6	Akola	BJP	Sanjay Shamrao Dhotre	INC	Patel Hidayat Ulla
7	Amravati	SS	Anandrao Vithoba Adsul	NCP	Navneet Kaur Rana
8	Wardha	BJP	Ramdas Tadas	INC	Sameer Meghe
9	Ramtek	SS	Krupal Tumane	INC	Mukul Wasnik
10	Nagpur	BJP	Nitin Gadkari	INC	Vilas Muttemwar
11	Bhandara–Gondiya	BJP	Nana Patole	NCP	Praful Patel
12	Gadchiroli–Chimur	BJP	Ashok Nete	INC	Namdeo Dalluji Usendi
13	Chandrapur	BJP	Hansraj Gangaram Ahir	INC	Deotale Sanjay Wamanrao
14	Yavatmal–Washim	SS	Bhavana Gawali	INC	Shivajirao Moghe
15	Hingoli	SS	Subhash Wankhede	INC	Rajeev Satav
16	Nanded	BJP	D. B. Patil	INC	Ashok Chavan
17	Parbhani	SS	Sanjay Haribhau Jadhav	NCP	Vijay Manikrao Bhamale
18	Jalna	BJP	Raosaheb Danve	INC	Vilas Autade
19	Aurangabad	SS	Raosaheb Danve	INC	Nitin Suresh Patil
20	Dindori	BJP	Harishchandra Chavan	NCP	Bharati Pawar
21	Nashik	SS	Hemant Godse	NCP	Chhagan Bhujbal
22	Palghar	BJP	Chintaman Vanaga	BVA	Baliram Sukur Jadhav
23	Bhiwandi	BJP	Kapil Patil	INC	Vishwanath Patil
24	Kalyan	SS	Shrikant Shinde	NCP	Anand Paranjpe
25	Thane	SS	Rajan Vichare	NCP	Sanjeev Naik
26	Mumbai North	BJP	Gopal Shetty	INC	Sanjay Nirupam
27	Mumbai North West	SS	Gajanan Kirtikar	INC	Gurudas Kamat
28	Mumbai North East	BJP	Kirit Somaiya	NCP	Sanjay Dina Patil
29	Mumbai North Central	BJP	Poonam Mahajan	INC	Priya Dutt
30	Mumbai South Central	SS	Rahul Shewale	INC	Eknath Gaikwad
31	Mumbai South	SS	Arvind Sawant	INC	Milind Deora
32	Raigad	SS	Anant Geete	NCP	Sunil Tatkare
33	Maval	SS	Shrirang Barne	NCP	Rahul Narwekar
34	Pune	BJP	Anil Shirole	INC	Vishwajeet Kadam
35	Baramati	RSPS	Mahadev Jankar	NCP	Supriya Sule
36	Shirur	SS	Shivajirao Adhalarao Patil	NCP	Nikam Devdatta Jaywant
37	Ahmadnagar	BJP	Dilipkumar Gandhi	NCP	Rajeev Rajale
38	Shirdi	SS	Sadashiv Lokhande	INC	Bhausaheb Wakchaure
39	Beed	BJP	Gopinath Munde	NCP	Suresh Dhas
40	Osmanabad	SS	Ravindra Gaikwad	NCP	Padamsinh Bajirao Patil
41	Latur	BJP	Sunil Gaikwad	INC	Bansode Dattatray Gunderao
42	Solapur	BJP	Sharad Bansode	INC	Sushilkumar Shinde
43	Madha	SWP	Sadabhau Khot	NCP	Vijaysinh Mohite–Patil
44	Sangli	BJP	Sanjaykaka Patil	INC	Pratik Prakashbapu Patil
45	Satara	RPI(A)	Ashok W. Gaikwad	NCP	Udayanraje Bhosale
46	Ratnagiri–Sindhudurg	SS	Vinayak Raut	INC	Nilesh Narayan Rane
47	Kolhapur	SS	Sanjay Mandlik	NCP	Dhananjay Mahadik
48	Hatkanangle	SWP	Raju Shetti	INC	Kallappa Awade

=== Region-wise candidates ===
Region	Total seats	NDA		UPA		Others
Region	Total seats	Bharatiya Janata Party	Shiv Sena	Indian National Congress	Nationalist Congress Party	Others
Region	Total seats	Seats contested	Seats contested	Seats contested	Seats contested	Others
Western Maharashtra	12	04	04	05	07	04
Vidarbha	10	06	04	07	03	00
Marathwada	8	04	04	05	03	00
Thane	04	02	02	01	02	01
Konkan	02	00	02	01	01	00
Mumbai	6	03	03	05	01	00
North Maharashtra	6	05	01	02	04	00
Total	48	24	20	26	21	05

Party	Bharatiya Janata Party	Shiv Sena	Swabhimani Paksha	Nationalist Congress Party	Indian National Congress
Party	National Democratic Alliance			United Progressive Alliance	
Leader					
Leader	Gopinath Munde	Anant Geete	Raju Shetti	Sharad Pawar	Ashok Chavan
Votes	27.6%	20.8%	2.3%	16.1%	18.3%
Seats	23 (27.6%)	18 (20.8%)	1 (2.3%)	4 (16.1)	2 (18.3%)
Seats	23 / 48 ▲14	18 / 48 ▲07	1 / 48	4 / 48	2 / 48

=== Seat metrics ===
Alliance	Party	Seats before	Retained	Gained	Lost	Seats won
NDA	BJP	09	09	▲14	Steady	23
NDA	Shiv Sena	11	10	▲09	▼01	18
UPA	INC	17	01	▲01	▼16	02
UPA	NCP	08	03	▲01	▼05	04

=== Results alliance-wise ===
Alliance	Seats	Seat change	Vote share
NDA	41	▲21	51.75%
UPA	6	▼19	35.02%

=== List of elected MPs ===
Constituency		Winner				Runner Up				Margin	%
#	Name	Candidate	Party	Votes	%	Candidate	Party	Votes	%	Margin	%
1	Nandurbar	Heena Gavit	BJP	579,486	51.88	Manikrao Hodlya Gavit	INC	472,581	42.31	106,905	9.57
2	Dhule	Subhash Bhamre	BJP	529,450	53.85	Amrish Patel	INC	398,727	40.56	130,723	13.29
3	Jalgaon	A. T. Patil	BJP	647,773	65.39	Satish Bhaskarrao Patil	NCP	264,248	26.68	383,525	38.71
4	Raver	Raksha Khadse	BJP	605,452	59.86	Manishdada Jain	NCP	287,384	28.41	318,068	31.45
5	Buldhana	Prataprao Jadhav	SHS	509,145	52.01	Ingle Krishnarao Ganpatrao	NCP	349,566	35.71	159,579	16.30
6	Akola	Sanjay Shamrao Dhotre	BJP	456,472	46.64	Patel Hidayat Ulla Barkat Ulla	INC	253,356	25.89	203,116	20.75
7	Amravati	Anandrao Vithoba Adsul	SHS	467,212	46.51	Navneet Kaur Rana	NCP	329,280	32.78	137,932	13.73
8	Wardha	Ramdas Tadas	BJP	537,518	53.03	Meghe Sagar Dattatraya	INC	321,735	31.74	215,783	21.29
9	Ramtek	Krupal Tumane	SHS	519,892	49.48	Mukul Wasnik	INC	344,101	32.75	175,791	16.73
10	Nagpur	Nitin Gadkari	BJP	587,767	54.13	Vilas Muttemwar	INC	302,919	27.90	284,848	26.23
11	Bhandara – Gondiya	Nana Patole	BJP	606,129	50.62	Praful Patel	NCP	456,875	38.16	149,254	12.46
12	Gadchiroli-Chimur	Ashok Nete	BJP	535,982	52.11	Dr. Namdeo Dalluji Usendi	INC	299,112	29.08	236,870	23.03
13	Chandrapur	Hansraj Gangaram Ahir	BJP	508,049	45.77	Sanjay Wamanrao Deotale	INC	271,780	24.49	236,269	21.28
14	Yavatmal-Washim	Bhavana Gawali	SHS	477,905	46.25	Shivajirao Moghe	INC	384,089	37.17	93,816	9.08
15	Hingoli	Rajeev Satav	INC	467,397	44.45	Subhash Wankhede	SHS	465,765	44.30	1,632	0.15
16	Nanded	Ashok Chavan	INC	493,075	48.63	D. B. Patil	BJP	411,620	40.59	81,455	8.04
17	Parbhani	Sanjay Jadhav	SHS	578,455	49.77	Vijay Bhamale	NCP	451,300	38.83	127,155	10.94
18	Jalna	Raosaheb Danve	BJP	591,428	55.46	Autade Vilas Keshavrao	INC	384,630	36.07	206,798	19.39
19	Aurangabad	Chandrakant Khaire	SHS	520,902	52.99	Patil Nitin Suresh	INC	358,902	36.51	162,000	16.48
20	Dindori	Harischandra Chavan	BJP	542,784	55.94	Bharati Pawar	NCP	295,165	30.42	247,619	25.52
21	Nashik	Hemant Godse	SHS	494,735	52.77	Chhagan Bhujbal	NCP	307,399	32.79	187,336	19.98
22	Palghar	Chintaman Vanaga	BJP	533,201	53.71	Baliram Jadhav	BVA	293,681	29.58	239,520	24.13
23	Bhiwandi	Kapil Patil	BJP	411,070	46.94	Patil Vishwanath Ramchandra	INC	301,620	34.44	109,450	12.50
24	Kalyan	Shrikant Shinde	SHS	440,892	53.41	Anand Paranjpe	NCP	190,143	23.04	250,749	30.37
25	Thane	Rajan Vichare	SHS	595,364	56.46	Sanjeev Naik	NCP	314,065	29.78	281,299	26.68
26	Mumbai North	Gopal Shetty	BJP	664,004	70.14	Sanjay Nirupam	INC	217,422	22.97	446,582	47.17
27	Mumbai North West	Gajanan Kirtikar	SHS	464,820	51.77	Gurudas Kamat	INC	281,792	31.38	183,028	20.39
28	Mumbai North East	Kirit Somaiya	BJP	525,285	60.90	Sanjay Patil	NCP	208,163	24.13	317,122	36.77
29	Mumbai North Central	Poonam Mahajan	BJP	478,535	56.60	Priya Dutt	INC	291,764	34.51	186,771	22.09
30	Mumbai South Central	Rahul Shewale	SHS	381,008	49.56	Eknath Gaikwad	INC	242,828	31.59	138,180	17.97
31	Mumbai South	Arvind Sawant	SHS	374,609	48.04	Milind Deora	INC	246,045	31.55	128,564	16.49
32	Raigad	Anant Geete	SHS	396,178	40.09	Sunil Tatkare	NCP	394,068	39.88	2,110	0.21
33	Maval	Shrirang Barne	SHS	512,226	43.62	Laxman Jagtap	PWPI	354,829	30.21	157,397	13.41
34	Pune	Anil Shirole	BJP	569,825	57.33	Vishwajeet Kadam	INC	254,056	25.56	315,769	31.77
35	Baramati	Supriya Sule	NCP	521,562	48.88	Mahadev Jankar	RSPS	451,843	42.35	69,719	6.53
36	Shirur	Shivajirao Patil	SHS	643,415	59.05	Nikam Devdatta Jaywant	NCP	341,601	31.35	301,814	27.70
37	Ahmednagar	Dilipkumar Gandhi	BJP	605,185	56.94	Rajeev Rajale	NCP	396,063	37.27	209,122	19.67
38	Shirdi	Sadashiv Lokhande	SHS	532,936	57.13	Bhausaheb Wakchaure	INC	333,014	35.70	199,922	21.43
39	Beed	Gopinath Munde	BJP	635,995	51.61	Suresh Dhas	NCP	499,541	40.53	136,454	11.08
40	Osmanabad	Ravindra Gaikwad	SHS	607,699	54.27	Padamsinh Bajirao Patil	NCP	373,374	33.35	234,325	20.92
41	Latur	Sunil Gaikwad	BJP	616,509	58.29	Bansode Dattatray Gunderao	INC	363,114	34.33	253,395	23.96
42	Solapur	Sharad Bansode	BJP	517,879	54.43	Sushilkumar Shinde	INC	368,205	38.70	149,674	15.73
43	Madha	Vijaysinh Mohite–Patil	NCP	489,989	45.36	Sadabhau Khot	SWP	464,645	43.02	25,344	2.34
44	Sangli	Sanjaykaka Patil	BJP	611,563	58.38	Pratik Patil	INC	372,271	35.54	239,292	22.84
45	Satara	Udayanraje Bhosale	NCP	522,531	53.50	Purushottam Jadhav	IND	155,937	15.97	366,594	37.53
46	Ratnagiri–Sindhudurg	Vinayak Raut	SHS	493,088	55.01	Nilesh Rane	INC	343,037	38.27	150,051	16.74
47	Kolhapur	Dhananjay Mahadik	NCP	607,665	48.19	Sanjay Mandlik	SHS	574,406	45.55	33,259	2.64
48	Hatkanangle	Raju Shetti	SWP	640,428	53.80	Kallappa Awade	INC	462,618	38.86	177,810	14.94

=== Region-wise results ===
Region	Total seats	Bharatiya Janata Party		Shiv Sena		Nationalist Congress Party		Indian National Congress		Others
Region	Total seats	Seats won		Seats won		Seats won		Seats won		
Western Maharashtra	11	04	▲03	02	Steady	04	▲01	00	▼03	01
Vidarbha	10	06	▲04	04	▲01	00	▼01	00	▼04	00
Marathwada	8	03	▲01	03	Steady	00	▼01	02	Steady	00
Thane+Konkan	7	02	▲02	05	▲02	00	▼01	00	▼02	00
Mumbai	6	03	▲03	03	▲03	00	▼01	00	▼05	00
North Maharashtra	6	05	▲01	01	▲01	00	▼01	00	▼01	00
Total	48	23	▲14	18	▲07	04	▼04	02	▼15	01

=== Region-wise average Votes polled ===
Region	Bharatiya Janata Party	Shiv Sena	Nationalist Congress Party	Indian National Congress
Region	Votes polled	Votes polled	Votes polled	Votes polled
Western Maharashtra	48.14%	49.56%	40.01%	34.67%
Vidarbha	50.40%	48.62%	35.60%	29.87%
Marathwada	49.86%	51.38%	37.59%	39.98%
Thane+Konkan	50.34%	53.59%	30.91%	36.36%
Mumbai	62.57%	49.79%	24.16%	30.40%
North Maharashtra	57.42%	52.77%	29.59%	41.44%

=== Western Maharashtra ===
Sr. no	Seats won		
1.	Pune	Anil Shirole	Bharatiya Janata Party
2.	Solapur (SC)	Sharad Bansode	Bharatiya Janata Party
3.	Sangli	Sanjaykaka Patil	Bharatiya Janata Party
4.	Baramati	Supriya Sule	Nationalist Congress Party
5.	Madha	Vijaysinh Shankarrao Mohite-Patil	Nationalist Congress Party
6.	Satara	Udayanraje Bhonsle	Nationalist Congress Party
7.	Maval	Shrirang Chandu Barne	Shiv Sena
8.	Shirur	Adhalrao Shivaji Dattatray	Shiv Sena
9.	Ahmednagar	Dilipkumar Mansukhlal Gandhi	Bharatiya Janata Party
10.	Kolhapur	Dhananjay Bhimrao Mahadik	Nationalist Congress Party
11.	Hatkanangle	Raju Shetty	Swabhimani Paksha

=== Vidarbha ===
Sr. no.	Seats won		
1.	Wardha	Ramdas Tadas	Bharatiya Janata Party
2.	Ramtek (SC)	Krupal Balaji Tumane	Shiv Sena
3.	Nagpur	Nitin Gadkari	Bharatiya Janata Party
4.	Gadchiroli-Chimur (ST)	Ashok Nete	Bharatiya Janata Party
5.	Bhandara-Gondiya	Nanabhau Patole	Bharatiya Janata Party
6.	Buldhana	Prataprao Ganpatrao Jadhav	Shiv Sena
7.	Amravati (SC)	Anandrao Vithoba Adsul	Shiv Sena
8.	Yavatmal-Washim	Bhavana Pundlikrao Gawali	Shiv Sena
9.	Akola	Sanjay Shamrao Dhotre	Bharatiya Janata Party
10.	Chandrapur	Hansraj Gangaram Ahir	Bharatiya Janata Party

=== Marathwada ===
Sr. no	Seats won		
1.	Nanded	Ashok Chavan	Indian National Congress
2.	Latur (SC)	Sunil Baliram Gaikwad	Bharatiya Janata Party
3.	Osmanabad	Ravindra Gaikwad	Shiv Sena
4.	Hingoli	Rajeev Shankarrao Satav	Indian National Congress
5.	Parbhani	Sanjay Haribhau Jadhav	Shiv Sena
6.	Aurangabad	Chandrakant Khaire	Shiv Sena
7.	Jalna	Raosaheb Dadarao Danve	Bharatiya Janata Party
8.	Beed	Gopinath Munde	Bharatiya Janata Party

=== Thane+Konkan ===
Sr. no	Seats won		
1.	Bhiwandi	Kapil Moreshwar Patil	Bharatiya Janata Party
2.	Ratnagiri-Sindhudurg	Vinayak Raut	Shiv Sena
3.	Thane	Rajan Vichare	Shiv Sena
4.	Kalyan	Shrikant Eknath Shinde	Shiv Sena
5.	Raigad	Anant Geete	Shiv Sena
7.	Palghar (ST)	Chintaman N. Wanga	Bharatiya Janata Party

=== Mumbai ===
Sr. no	Seats won		
1.	Mumbai North	Gopal Chinayya Shetty	Bharatiya Janata Party
2.	Mumbai North West	Gajanan Kirtikar	Shiv Sena
3.	Mumbai North East	Kirit Somaiya	Bharatiya Janata Party
4.	Mumbai North Central	Poonam Mahajan	Bharatiya Janata Party
5.	Mumbai South Central	Rahul Shewale	Shiv Sena
6.	Mumbai South	Arvind Sawant	Shiv Sena

=== North Maharashtra ===
Sr. no	Seats won		
1.	Nandurbar (ST)	Heena Vijaykumar Gavit	Bharatiya Janata Party
2.	Dhule	Subhash Ramrao Bhamre	Bharatiya Janata Party
3.	Jalgaon	A T Nana Patil	Bharatiya Janata Party
4.	Raver	Raksha Nikhil Khadase	Bharatiya Janata Party
5.	Nashik	Hemant Tukaram Godse	Shiv Sena
6.	Dindori (ST)	Harishchandra Chavan	Bharatiya Janata Party

== Post-election Union Council of Ministers from Maharashtra ==
#	Name	Constituency	Designation	Department	From	To	Party
1	Nitin Gadkari	Nagpur (Lok Sabha)	Cabinet Minister	Road Transport and Highways; Shipping; (Additional Charge: Rural Development, Panchayati Raj, Drinking Water & Sanitation; Water Resources, River Development & Ganga Rejuvenation)	27 May 2014	30 May 2019	BJP
2	Piyush Goyal	Maharashtra (Rajya Sabha)	Cabinet Minister (Previously MoS (I/C))	Coal; Railways; Power (MoS (I/C)); New and Renewable Energy (MoS (I/C)); Mines (MoS (I/C)); (Additional Charge: Finance; Corporate Affairs)	27 May 2014	30 May 2019	BJP
3	Prakash Javadekar	Maharashtra (Rajya Sabha from April 2018); Previously Madhya Pradesh	Cabinet Minister (Previously MoS (I/C))	Human Resource Development; (Previously: Environment, Forest and Climate Change; Information and Broadcasting; Parliamentary Affairs)	27 May 2014	30 May 2019	BJP
4	Gopinath Munde	Beed (Lok Sabha)	Cabinet Minister	Rural Development; Panchayati Raj; Drinking Water and Sanitation	27 May 2014	3 June 2014 (Died)	BJP
5	Hansraj Ahir	Chandrapur (Lok Sabha)	MoS	Home Affairs; Chemicals and Fertilizers	9 November 2014	30 May 2019	BJP
6	Subhash Bhamre	Dhule (Lok Sabha)	MoS	Defence	5 July 2016	30 May 2019	BJP
7	Raosaheb Danve	Jalna (Lok Sabha)	MoS	Consumer Affairs, Food and Public Distribution	27 May 2014	6 March 2015 (Resigned)	BJP
8	Anant Geete	Raigad (Lok Sabha)	Cabinet Minister	Heavy Industries and Public Enterprises	27 May 2014	30 May 2019	SS
9	Ramdas Athawale	Maharashtra (Rajya Sabha)	MoS	Social Justice and Empowerment	5 July 2016	30 May 2019	RPI(A)

== Assembly segments wise lead of Parties ==
Party	Assembly segments	Position in Assembly (as of 2014 election)
Bharatiya Janata Party	132	122
Shiv Sena	100	63
Nationalist Congress Party	26	41
Indian National Congress	16	42
Swabhimani Paksha	9	0
Rashtriya Samaj Paksha	3	1
Peasants and Workers Party of India	2	3
Others	0	16
Total	288	
