= Bhandup West Assembly constituency =

Constituency of the Maharashtra legislative assembly in India

Coordinates: 19.15°N 72.93°E

Bhandup West
- Constituency No. 157 for the Maharashtra Legislative Assembly

Constituency details
- Country: India
- Region: Western India
- State: Maharashtra
- District: Mumbai Suburban
- Lok Sabha constituency: Mumbai North East
- Established: 2008
- Total electors: 288,404
- Reservation: None

Member of Legislative Assembly
- 15th Maharashtra Legislative Assembly
- Incumbent Ashok Patil
- Party: SHS
- Alliance: NDA
- Elected year: 2024

Bhandup West Assembly constituency is one of the 26 Maharashtra Legislative Assembly constituencies located in the Mumbai Suburban district.

== Overview ==
For national elections, it is part of the Mumbai North East Lok Sabha constituency along with five other Vidhan Sabha segments, namely Mulund, Ghatkopar West, Ghatkopar East, Mankhurd Shivaji Nagar and Vikhroli in the Mumbai Suburban district.

== Members of the Legislative Assembly ==
| Year | Member | Party |
|---|---|---|
1951-2008: See Bhandup
| 2009 | Shishir Shinde | Maharashtra Navnirman Sena |
| 2014 | Ashok Patil | Shiv Sena |
| 2019 | Ramesh Korgaonkar | Shiv Sena |
| 2024 | Ashok Patil | Shiv Sena |

== Election results ==
=== Assembly Election 2024 ===
2024 Maharashtra Legislative Assembly election : Bhandup West
| Party | Candidate | Votes | % | ±% |
|---|---|---|---|---|
| SS | Ashok Patil | 77,754 | 43.31 | ▼2.95 |
| SS(UBT) | Ramesh Korgaonkar | 70,990 | 39.54 | New |
| MNS | Shirish Gunwant Sawant | 23,335 | 13.00 | ▼14.51 |
| VBA | Snehal Arun Sohani | 4,505 | 2.51 | ▼2.31 |
| NOTA | None of the Above | 2,406 | 1.34 | ▼1.06 |
| Margin of victory | | 6,764 | 3.77 | ▼14.99 |
| Turnout | | 1,81,925 | 63.08 | ▲7.33 |
| Total valid votes | | 1,79,519 | | |
| Registered electors | | 2,88,404 | | ▲1.81 |
| SS hold | | Swing | ▼2.95 | |

=== Assembly Election 2019 ===
2019 Maharashtra Legislative Assembly election : Bhandup West
| Party | Candidate | Votes | % | ±% |
|---|---|---|---|---|
| SS | Ramesh Korgaonkar | 71,955 | 46.26 | ▲16.80 |
| MNS | Sandeep Prabhakar Jalgaonkar | 42,782 | 27.50 | ▲5.37 |
| INC | Koparkar Suresh Harishchandra | 30,731 | 19.76 | ▲9.65 |
| VBA | Satish Jaising Mane | 7,503 | 4.82 | New |
| NOTA | None of the Above | 3,732 | 2.40 | ▲1.33 |
| BSP | Ravi Ashok Thate | 1,483 | 0.95 | New |
| Margin of victory | | 29,173 | 18.75 | ▲15.84 |
| Turnout | | 1,59,327 | 56.24 | ▲0.15 |
| Total valid votes | | 1,55,550 | | |
| Registered electors | | 2,83,275 | | ▼5.10 |
| SS hold | | Swing | ▲16.80 | |

=== Assembly Election 2014 ===
2014 Maharashtra Legislative Assembly election : Bhandup West
| Party | Candidate | Votes | % | ±% |
|---|---|---|---|---|
| SS | Ashok Patil | 48,151 | 29.46 | ▲6.29 |
| BJP | Manoj Kotak | 43,379 | 26.54 | New |
| MNS | Shishir Shinde | 36,183 | 22.14 | ▼23.77 |
| INC | Shyam Tukaram Sawant | 16,521 | 10.11 | New |
| Independent | Koparkar Suresh Harishchandra | 6,599 | 4.04 | New |
| NCP | Lal Bahadur Singh | 4,153 | 2.54 | ▼22.57 |
| CPI(M) | Hemkant Samant | 2,875 | 1.76 | New |
| NOTA | None of the Above | 1,755 | 1.07 | New |
| Margin of victory | | 4,772 | 2.92 | ▼17.88 |
| Turnout | | 1,65,249 | 55.36 | ▲2.32 |
| Total valid votes | | 1,63,461 | | |
| Registered electors | | 2,98,510 | | ▲5.21 |
| SS gain from MNS | | Swing | ▼16.45 | |

=== Assembly Election 2009 ===
2009 Maharashtra Legislative Assembly election : Bhandup West
| Party | Candidate | Votes | % | ±% |
|---|---|---|---|---|
| MNS | Shishir Shinde | 68,302 | 45.91 | |
| NCP | Shiwajirao Nalawade | 37,359 | 25.11 | |
| SS | Sunil Raut | 34,467 | 23.17 | |
| BSP | Sujit Pagare | 3,030 | 2.04 | |
| Independent | Sujay Gopal Dhurat | 1,902 | 1.28 | |
| Independent | Ramesh Harshi Chheda | 1,441 | 0.97 | |
| Independent | Kamble Chandrashekhar Maruti | 990 | 0.67 | |
| Margin of victory | | 30,943 | 20.80 | |
| Turnout | | 1,48,779 | 52.44 | |
| Total valid votes | | 1,48,777 | | |
| Registered electors | | 2,83,723 | | |
| MNS win (new seat) | | | | |

== See also ==
- List of constituencies of Maharashtra Vidhan Sabha
