= Mumbai North East Lok Sabha constituency =

Lok Sabha constituency in Maharashtra

Coordinates: 19.13°N 72.93°E

Mumbai North East Lok Sabha
- Lok Sabha constituency
- Interactive Map Outlining Mumbai North East Lok Sabha Constituency

Constituency details
- Country: India
- Region: Western India
- State: Maharashtra
- Assembly constituencies: Mulund; Vikhroli; Bhandup West; Ghatkopar West; Ghatkopar East; Mankhurd Shivaji Nagar
- Established: 1952
- Total electors: 16,36,871(2024)

Member of Parliament
- 18th Lok Sabha
- Incumbent Sanjay Dina Patil
- Party: SHS
- Alliance: NDA
- Elected year: 2024
- Preceded by: Manoj Kotak

Mumbai North East Lok Sabha constituency is a Lok Sabha parliamentary constituency of Maharashtra.

== Assembly segments ==
Presently, Mumbai North East constituency comprises six Vidhan Sabha (Legislative Assembly) segments. These segments are:

#	Name	District	Member	Party	Leading (in 2024)
155	Mulund	Mumbai Suburban	Mihir Kotecha	BJP	BJP
156	Vikhroli	Mumbai Suburban	Sunil Raut	SS(UBT)	SS(UBT)
157	Bhandup West	Mumbai Suburban	Ashok Patil	SHS	SS(UBT)
169	Ghatkopar West	Mumbai Suburban	Ram Kadam	BJP	SS(UBT)
170	Ghatkopar East	Mumbai Suburban	Parag Shah	BJP	BJP
171	Mankhurd Shivaji Nagar	Mumbai Suburban	Abu Azmi	SP	SS(UBT)

== Members of Parliament ==
Year	Name	Party
1967	Sadashiv Govind Barve	Indian National Congress
1967 (Note: bypoll)	Tara Govind Sapre	Indian National Congress
1971	Rajaram Gopal Kulkarni	Indian National Congress
1977	Subramanian Swamy	Janata Party
1980	Subramanian Swamy	Janata Party
1984	Gurudas Kamat	Indian National Congress
1989	Jayawantiben Mehta	Bharatiya Janata Party
1991	Gurudas Kamat	Indian National Congress
1996	Pramod Mahajan	Bharatiya Janata Party
1998	Gurudas Kamat	Indian National Congress
1999	Kirit Somaiya	Bharatiya Janata Party
2004	Gurudas Kamat	Indian National Congress
2009	Sanjay Dina Patil	Nationalist Congress Party
2014	Kirit Somaiya	Bharatiya Janata Party
2019	Manoj Kotak	Bharatiya Janata Party
2024	Sanjay Dina Patil	Shiv Sena (UBT)

== Election results ==
=== Lok Sabha 1967 ===
- Sadashiv Govind Barve (INC) : 171,902 votes (Died in March 1967)
- V. K. Krishna Menon (IND) : 158,733
- M S Agaskar (Jana Sangh) : 78,796 (Came in third position)

==== By-poll 1967 ====
- Tara Sapre (INC) : 156,313 votes (S G Barve's sister)
- V. K. Krishna Menon (IND) : 141,257

=== Lok Sabha 1971 ===
- Rajaram Gopal Kulkarni of the Congress (2,83,792 votes)
- Mukundrao Sundarrao Agaskar of the Bharatiya Jana Sangh (1,08,513)
- K. M. Cariappa (Independent, w Shiv Sena support) : finished third (90,110 votes)

=== Lok Sabha 1977 ===
- Subramanian Swamy (Janata Party) : 260,699 votes
- Rajaram Gopal, urf Raja, Kulkarni of the Congress (137,577 votes)

=== Lok Sabha 1998 ===
1998 Indian general election: Mumbai North East
Party	Candidate	Votes	%	±%
INC	Gurudas Kamat	5,25,911	51.07	
BJP	Pramod Mahajan	4,78,459	46.46	
BSP	Garud Vilas Govid	5,427	0.53	
Majority		47,452	4.61	
Turnout		10,29,784	53.46	
INC gain from BJP		Swing		

=== General elections 1999 ===
1999 Indian general election: Mumbai North East
Party	Candidate	Votes	%	±%
BJP	Kirit Somaiya	4,00,436	43.08	
INC	Gurudas Kamat	3,93,160	42.30	
NCP	Dr. Rammanohar Tripathi	1,02,513	11.03	
IND.	Dattatray Bhojraj Waghmare	13,406	1.44	
BSP	Sayyad Shamim Jaffrey	8,501	0.91	
Majority		7,276	0.78	
Turnout		9,29,417	46.70	
BJP gain from INC		Swing		

=== General elections 2004 ===
2004 Indian general elections: Mumbai North East
Party	Candidate	Votes	%	±%
INC	Gurudas Kamat	4,93,420	53.30	+11.00
BJP	Kirit Somaiya	3,94,020	42.57	−0.51
Majority		99,400	10.73	+9.95
Turnout		9,25,659	46.88	+0.18
INC gain from BJP		Swing	+11.00	

=== General elections 2009 ===
2009 Indian general elections: Mumbai North East
Party	Candidate	Votes	%	±%
NCP	Sanjay Dina Patil	2,13,505	31.97	5
BJP	Kirit Somaiya	2,10,572	31.53	−10.32
MNS	Shishir Shinde	1,95,148	29.22	N/A
Majority		2,933	0.44	−10.29
Turnout		6,67,904	42.46	−4.42
NCP gain from INC		Swing	-21.33	

=== General elections 2014 ===
2014 Indian general elections: Mumbai North East
Party	Candidate	Votes	%	±%
BJP	Dr. Kirit Somaiya	525,285	60.95	+29.42
NCP	Sanjay Dina Patil	2,08,163	24.16	−7.81
AAP	Medha Patkar	76,451	8.87	N/A
NOTA	None of the Above	7,114	0.83	N/A
Majority		3,17,122	36.79	+36.35
Turnout		8,61,761	51.65	+9.19
BJP gain from NCP		Swing	+28.98	

=== General elections 2019 ===
2019 Indian general elections: Mumbai North East
Party	Candidate	Votes	%	±%
BJP	Manoj Kishorbhai Kotak	514,599	56.61	−4.34
NCP	Sanjay Dina Patil	2,88,113	31.70	+7.54
VBA	Niharika Khondalay	68,239	7.51	N/A
NOTA	None of the Above	12,466	1.37	+0.54
Majority		2,26,486	24.91	−11.88
Turnout		9,09,181	57.23	+5.58
BJP hold		Swing	-4.34	

=== General elections 2024 ===
2024 Indian general election: Mumbai North East
Party	Candidate	Votes	%	±%
SS(UBT)	Sanjay Dina Patil	450,937	48.67	New
BJP	Mihir Kotecha	4,21,076	45.45	▼11.16
VBA	Daulat Kadar Khan	14,657	1.58	▼5.93
NOTA	None of the Above	10,173	1.10	▼0.27
Majority		29,861	3.22	▼21.69
Turnout		9,27,267	56.63	▼0.60
SS(UBT) gain from BJP		Swing		

== See also ==
- Mumbai
- List of constituencies of the Lok Sabha
- Timeline of Mumbai events
