= Ghatkopar Assembly constituency =

Constituency of the Maharashtra legislative assembly in India

Ghatkopar
- Former constituency for the Maharashtra Legislative Assembly

Constituency details
- Country: India
- Region: Western India
- State: Maharashtra
- Established: 1967
- Abolished: 2008
- Total electors: 219,325

Ghatkopar Assembly constituency was an assembly constituency in the India state of Maharashtra.

== Members of the Legislative Assembly ==
Election	Member	Party
1967	D. Samant	Republican Party of India
1972	R. Vishnunarayan Tripathi	Indian National Congress
1978	Parekh Jayantilal Ghambhirdas	Janata Party
1980	Liladhar Shamji Vyas	Indian National Congress
1985	Virendra Bakshi	Indian National Congress
1990	Prakash Mehta	Bharatiya Janata Party
1995	Prakash Mehta	Bharatiya Janata Party
1999	Prakash Mehta	Bharatiya Janata Party
2004	Prakash Mehta	Bharatiya Janata Party
After 2009 See : Ghatkopar East
2009	Prakash Mehta	Bharatiya Janata Party
2014	Prakash Mehta	Bharatiya Janata Party
2019	Parag Shah	Bharatiya Janata Party
2024	Parag Shah	Bharatiya Janata Party

|}

== Election results ==
=== Assembly Election 2004 ===
2004 Maharashtra Legislative Assembly election : Ghatkopar
Party	Candidate	Votes	%	±%
BJP	Prakash Mehta	73,548	65.51%	▲3.70
INC	Maheshbhai Bhanushali	33,859	30.16%	▲7.68
BSP	Adagale Popat Pandurang	2,143	1.91%	▲1.28
Independent	Sandeepbhai Krishna Pagare	1,119	1.00%	New
Margin of victory		39,689	35.35%	▼3.98
Turnout		112,268	51.19%	▼0.20
Registered electors		219,325		▼1.39
BJP hold		Swing	▲3.70	

=== Assembly Election 1999 ===
1999 Maharashtra Legislative Assembly election : Ghatkopar
Party	Candidate	Votes	%	±%
BJP	Prakash Mehta	70,641	61.81%	▲4.38
INC	Chandrika Premji Keniya	25,689	22.48%	▼13.41
NCP	Jyantibhai Gambhirdas Parekh	15,995	13.99%	New
BSP	Pratap Jitendra Makwana	724	0.63%	New
Margin of victory		44,952	39.33%	▲17.79
Turnout		114,292	51.38%	▼14.48
Registered electors		222,426		▲2.98
BJP hold		Swing	▲4.38	

=== Assembly Election 1995 ===
1995 Maharashtra Legislative Assembly election : Ghatkopar
Party	Candidate	Votes	%	±%
BJP	Prakash Mehta	81,700	57.43%	▲8.80
INC	Bakshi Verandra	51,051	35.88%	▼1.20
JD	Nautam Mehta	2,769	1.95%	▼9.89
Independent	Ashok Nair	1,128	0.79%	New
Independent	Sainath Maruti Dhasal	956	0.67%	New
Margin of victory		30,649	21.54%	▲10.01
Turnout		142,263	64.84%	▲8.45
Registered electors		215,993		▲12.22
BJP hold		Swing	▲8.80	

=== Assembly Election 1990 ===
1990 Maharashtra Legislative Assembly election : Ghatkopar
Party	Candidate	Votes	%	±%
BJP	Prakash Mehta	53,733	48.62%	▲22.66
INC	Bakshi Verandra	40,982	37.09%	▼6.95
JD	Kishor R. Shah	13,076	11.83%	New
Margin of victory		12,751	11.54%	▼6.54
Turnout		110,505	56.90%	▲9.61
Registered electors		192,467		▲16.82
BJP gain from INC		Swing	▲4.58	

=== Assembly Election 1985 ===
1985 Maharashtra Legislative Assembly election : Ghatkopar
Party	Candidate	Votes	%	±%
INC	Virendra Bakshi	34,692	44.04%	New
BJP	Prakash Mehta	20,454	25.97%	▼3.65
Independent	Ahire Kashinath Shivram	11,582	14.70%	New
Independent	Anant Ganpat Mane	7,852	9.97%	New
Independent	Adhav Murlidhar Satwaji	2,239	2.84%	New
Independent	Kantaram Sonawane	598	0.76%	New
Margin of victory		14,238	18.07%	▲14.77
Turnout		78,772	47.32%	▲3.93
Registered electors		164,762		▲17.06
INC gain from INC(I)		Swing	▲11.12	

=== Assembly Election 1980 ===
1980 Maharashtra Legislative Assembly election : Ghatkopar
Party	Candidate	Votes	%	±%
INC(I)	Liladhar Shamji Vyas	20,331	32.92%	▲18.21
BJP	Ashwin Somnath Vyas	18,292	29.62%	New
JP	Parekh Jayantilal Ghambhirdas	16,789	27.18%	▼22.33
RPI	Ahire Kashinath Shivram	2,398	3.88%	▼1.92
INC(U)	Gunvanti Shah	2,210	3.58%	New
Independent	Gopal Kushapara Dudhibal	394	0.64%	New
Margin of victory		2,039	3.30%	▼31.25
Turnout		61,760	43.42%	▼21.93
Registered electors		140,747		▲13.50
INC(I) gain from JP		Swing	▼16.59	

=== Assembly Election 1978 ===
1978 Maharashtra Legislative Assembly election : Ghatkopar
Party	Candidate	Votes	%	±%
JP	Parekh Jayantilal Ghambhirdas	40,408	49.51%	New
Independent	Dadia Uttamchand Dosabhai	12,209	14.96%	New
INC(I)	Vyas Lalidhar Shamji	12,003	14.71%	New
SS	Bagwe Shashikant Sadashiv	10,759	13.18%	▲2.08
RPI	Phale Rambhaji Bhivaji	4,737	5.80%	New
Margin of victory		28,199	34.55%	▼12.41
Turnout		81,610	64.75%	▲4.56
Registered electors		124,010		▼28.67
JP gain from INC		Swing	▼10.56	

=== Assembly Election 1972 ===
1972 Maharashtra Legislative Assembly election : Ghatkopar
Party	Candidate	Votes	%	±%
INC	R. Vishnunarayan Tripathi	63,959	60.07%	▲31.30
ABJS	Rajanikant C. Thakar	13,953	13.10%	▼5.17
SS	Mohan Murari Sawant	11,817	11.10%	New
RPI(K)	Charandas Haridas Khare	5,691	5.35%	New
SSP	Liyakat H. I. Husain	5,382	5.05%	New
INC(O)	Laxman Dharkar Prabhakar	2,799	2.63%	New
Margin of victory		50,006	46.97%	▲34.85
Turnout		106,471	59.86%	▼7.71
Registered electors		173,846		▲41.54
INC gain from RPI		Swing	▲19.18	

=== Assembly Election 1967 ===
1967 Maharashtra Legislative Assembly election : Ghatkopar
Party	Candidate	Votes	%	±%
RPI	D. Samant	34,631	40.89%	New
INC	A. N. Magar	24,366	28.77%	New
ABJS	N. P. Shah	15,477	18.27%	New
Independent	C. C. John	3,917	4.62%	New
Independent	S. Balakrishnan	839	0.99%	New
Margin of victory		10,265	12.12%	
Turnout		84,694	64.93%	
Registered electors		122,823		
RPI win (new seat)				
