= Bhandup Assembly constituency =

Defunct seat in Maharashtra Legislative Assembly in India

Coordinates: 19.145°N 72.937°E

Bhandup
- Former constituency for the Maharashtra Legislative Assembly

Constituency details
- Country: India
- Region: Western India
- State: Maharashtra
- Lok Sabha constituency: Mumbai North East
- Established: 1972
- Abolished: 2008

Bhandup Vidhan Sabha seat was one of the seats in Maharashtra Legislative Assembly in India. It was made defunct after the constituency map of India was redrawn in 2008. Now there is a new constituency named Bhandup West which is a segment of Mumbai North East Lok Sabha seat.

== Members of Vidhan Sabha ==
Year	Member	Party
1960-1972: Constituency did not exist
1978	Prabhakar Sanzgiri	Communist Party of India (Marxist)
1980	Waman Ramchandra Shekerkar	Indian National Congress (I)
1985	Waman Ramchandra Shekerkar	Indian National Congress
1990	Liladhar Dake	Shiv Sena
1995	Liladhar Dake	Shiv Sena
1999	Liladhar Dake	Shiv Sena
2004	Sanjay Dina Patil	Nationalist Congress Party
2008 onwards: See Bhandup West

== Election results ==
=== Assembly Election 2004 ===
2004 Maharashtra Legislative Assembly election : Bhandup
Party	Candidate	Votes	%	±%
NCP	Sanjay Dina Patil	79,440	44.90%	▲8.48
SS	Liladhar Dake	73,760	41.69%	▼0.46
BBM	Anandraj Ambedkar	6,654	3.76%	New
BSP	Chandrakant Bhimrao Nirbhavane	5,057	2.86%	▼0.09
CPI(M)	Madan Naik	4,925	2.78%	New
SP	Sanjay Jagannath Keni	2,132	1.20%	New
Independent	Vitthalrao Janaji Sonawane	1,677	0.95%	New
Margin of victory		5,680	3.21%	▼2.53
Turnout		176,941	53.00%	▲5.44
Total valid votes		176,933		
Registered electors		333,853		▲3.98
NCP gain from SS		Swing	▲2.75	

=== Assembly Election 1999 ===
1999 Maharashtra Legislative Assembly election : Bhandup
Party	Candidate	Votes	%	±%
SS	Liladhar Dake	64,328	42.15%	▼5.90
NCP	Sanjay Dina Patil	55,572	36.41%	New
RPI	Adv. Ashok Gajanan Talwatkar	22,549	14.78%	New
BSP	Popatrao Pandurang Adangle	4,499	2.95%	▲1.50
Independent	Chandrashekhar M. Shetty	1,660	1.09%	New
ABS	A. K. Maini	1,633	1.07%	New
Independent	Sukhdeo Chandu Dandge	1,396	0.91%	New
Margin of victory		8,756	5.74%	▼5.72
Turnout		152,684	47.55%	▼14.66
Total valid votes		152,613		
Registered electors		321,069		▲2.32
SS hold		Swing	▼5.90	

=== Assembly Election 1995 ===
1995 Maharashtra Legislative Assembly election : Bhandup
Party	Candidate	Votes	%	±%
SS	Liladhar Dake	93,807	48.05%	▲3.20
INC	Manorama Dinanath Patil	71,449	36.60%	▼0.46
CPI(M)	Madan Naik	16,803	8.61%	▼1.09
JD	Gangurde Chintaman Nana	6,916	3.54%	New
BSP	Takalkar Jijabai Kashinath	2,823	1.45%	New
Margin of victory		22,358	11.45%	▲3.66
Turnout		198,272	63.19%	▲2.46
Total valid votes		195,208		
Registered electors		313,788		▲18.74
SS hold		Swing	▲3.20	

=== Assembly Election 1990 ===
1990 Maharashtra Legislative Assembly election : Bhandup
Party	Candidate	Votes	%	±%
SS	Liladhar Dake	70,834	44.86%	New
INC	Dinanath Bama Patil	58,523	37.06%	▼1.28
CPI(M)	Sanzgiri Prabhakar Pandurang	15,320	9.70%	▼3.81
RPI	Chouhan Lalsing Hnatsingh	11,995	7.60%	New
Margin of victory		12,311	7.80%	▼13.10
Turnout		159,405	60.32%	▲9.59
Total valid votes		157,904		
Registered electors		264,268		▲31.44
SS gain from INC		Swing	▲6.51	

=== Assembly Election 1985 ===
1985 Maharashtra Legislative Assembly election : Bhandup
Party	Candidate	Votes	%	±%
INC	Waman Ramchandra Shekerkar	38,674	38.34%	New
BJP	Madhukar R. Desai	17,600	17.45%	▼7.70
CPI(M)	Sanzgiri Prabhakar Pandurang	13,633	13.52%	▼17.77
Independent	Kadam Edanath Hari	11,618	11.52%	New
Independent	Shishir Shinde	8,582	8.51%	New
Independent	V. D. Khade	6,986	6.93%	New
Independent	Chintaman Nana Gangurde	1,153	1.14%	New
Margin of victory		21,074	20.89%	▲9.74
Turnout		101,855	50.66%	▲15.97
Total valid votes		100,859		
Registered electors		201,059		▲19.79
INC gain from INC(I)		Swing	▼4.10	

=== Assembly Election 1980 ===
1980 Maharashtra Legislative Assembly election : Bhandup
Party	Candidate	Votes	%	±%
INC(I)	Waman Ramchandra Shekerkar	24,354	42.44%	▲25.98
CPI(M)	Prabhakar Pandurang Sanzgiri	17,955	31.29%	▼17.37
BJP	Madhukar R. Desai	14,435	25.16%	New
Independent	Thakker Bipin Naranji	418	0.73%	New
Margin of victory		6,399	11.15%	▼17.57
Turnout		57,876	34.48%	▼31.70
Total valid votes		57,384		
Registered electors		167,841		▲12.81
INC(I) gain from CPI(M)		Swing	▼6.22	

=== Assembly Election 1978 ===
1978 Maharashtra Legislative Assembly election : Bhandup
Party	Candidate	Votes	%	±%
CPI(M)	Prabhakar Pandurang Sanzgiri	47,708	48.66%	New
INC	Dinanath Bama Patil	19,555	19.95%	New
INC(I)	Nirbhavane Bhimrao Dhondiram	16,139	16.46%	New
SS	Padwal Ramchandra Vishnu	13,267	13.53%	New
Independent	Batia Jogindersigh Gurudayalsingh	920	0.94%	New
Margin of victory		28,153	28.72%	
Turnout		99,515	66.89%	
Total valid votes		98,036		
Registered electors		148,783		
CPI(M) win (new seat)				

== See also ==
- List of constituencies of Maharashtra Legislative Assembly
