= Vikhroli Assembly constituency =

Constituency of the Maharashtra legislative assembly in India

Coordinates: 19.11°N 72.93°E

Vikhroli
- Constituency No. 156 for the Maharashtra Legislative Assembly

Constituency details
- Country: India
- Region: Western India
- State: Maharashtra
- District: Mumbai Suburban
- Lok Sabha constituency: Mumbai North East
- Established: 2008
- Total electors: 243,597
- Reservation: None

Member of Legislative Assembly
- 15th Maharashtra Legislative Assembly
- Incumbent Sunil Rajaram Raut
- Party: SS(UBT)
- Alliance: MVA
- Elected year: 2019

Vikhroli Assembly constituency is one of the 288 Vidhan Sabha (Legislative Assembly) constituencies of Maharashtra state in western India.

== Overview ==
Vikhroli constituency is one of the 26 Vidhan Sabha constituencies located in Mumbai Suburban district.

Vikhroli is part of Mumbai North East Lok Sabha constituency along with five other Vidhan Sabha constituencies in Mumbai Suburban district, namely Mulund, Ghatkopar West, Ghatkopar East, Mankhurd Shivaji Nagar and Bhandup West.

== Members of the Legislative Assembly ==
Year	Member	Party
Till 2009 : Constituency did not exist
2009	Mangesh Sangle	Maharashtra Navnirman Sena
2014	Sunil Raut	Shiv Sena
2019	Sunil Raut	Shiv Sena
2024	Sunil Raut	Shiv Sena (UBT)

== Election results ==
=== Assembly Election 2024 ===
2024 Maharashtra Legislative Assembly election : Vikhroli
Party	Candidate	Votes	%	±%
SS(UBT)	Sunil Rajaram Raut	66,093	47.44%	New
SS	Suvarna Sahadev Karanje	50,567	36.29%	▼14.03
MNS	Vishwajit Shankar Dholam	16,813	12.07%	▼0.79
VBA	Ajay Ravindra Kharat	3,443	2.47%	▼4.86
NOTA	None of the Above	1,709	1.23%	▼1.31
Margin of victory		15,526	11.14%	▼11.17
Turnout		141,035	57.90%	▲2.52
Total valid votes		139,326		
Registered electors		243,597		▲5.41
SS(UBT) gain from SS		Swing	▼2.88	

=== Assembly Election 2019 ===
2019 Maharashtra Legislative Assembly election : Vikhroli
Party	Candidate	Votes	%	±%
SS	Sunil Rajaram Raut	62,794	50.32%	▲11.11
NCP	Dhananjay (Dada) Pisal	34,953	28.01%	▲12.24
MNS	Vinod Ramchandra Shinde	16,042	12.86%	▼6.60
VBA	Siddharth Mokle	9,150	7.33%	New
NOTA	None of the Above	3,168	2.54%	▲0.00
BSP	Shailesh Vivekanand Sonawane	834	0.67%	▼1.79
Margin of victory		27,841	22.31%	▲2.56
Turnout		127,974	55.38%	▲5.03
Total valid votes		124,783		
Registered electors		231,104		▼9.31
SS hold		Swing	▲11.11	

=== Assembly Election 2014 ===
2014 Maharashtra Legislative Assembly election : Vikhroli
Party	Candidate	Votes	%	±%
SS	Sunil Rajaram Raut	50,302	39.21%	▲16.51
MNS	Mangesh Eknath Sangale	24,963	19.46%	▼23.41
NCP	Sanjay Dina Patil	20,233	15.77%	▼10.63
INC	Dr. Sandesh Balasaheb Mhatre	18,046	14.07%	New
RPI(A)	Vivek Pandit	6,975	5.44%	New
NOTA	None of the Above	3,251	2.53%	New
BSP	Balaji Mukundrao Othale	3,150	2.46%	▲0.38
BBM	Trupti Raju Khare	1,263	0.98%	▲0.34
Margin of victory		25,339	19.75%	▲3.28
Turnout		131,537	51.62%	▼2.08
Total valid votes		128,282		
Registered electors		254,830		▲7.79
SS gain from MNS		Swing	▼3.66	

=== Assembly Election 2009 ===
2009 Maharashtra Legislative Assembly election : Vikhroli
Party	Candidate	Votes	%	±%
MNS	Mangesh Eknath Sangale	53,125	42.87%	New
NCP	Pallavi Sanjay Patil	32,713	26.40%	New
SS	Dattaram Babi Dalvi	28,129	22.70%	New
Lok Bharati	Vinod Kambli	3,861	3.12%	New
BSP	Dinesh Rajdev Rajbhar	2,572	2.08%	New
Independent	Pius Verghese Pullikottil	1,069	0.86%	New
BBM	Pawar Sumedh Ulhas	799	0.64%	New
Margin of victory		20,412	16.47%	
Turnout		123,915	52.42%	
Total valid votes		123,914		
Registered electors		236,407		
MNS win (new seat)				
