= Sadashiv Govind Barve =

Indian politician

Sadashiv Govind Barve (Marathi: सदाशिव गोविन्द बर्वे variously mentioned as Sa Go Barve (or S. G. Barve, Marathi: स गो बर्वे) (1914 – 1967) was an Indian politician. He first made his name as an administrator, and was later persuaded to join politics by Yashwantrao Chavan.

He joined the Congress Party and was elected to Maharashtra Vidhan Sabha in 1962 from Shivajinagar (Vidhan Sabha constituency) in Pune. Five years later he was elected to Lok Sabha (Indian parliament) from Mumbai North East (Lok Sabha constituency). But he died on 6 March 1967, in the very week when results of the election were announced. The seat which fell vacant was filled by his sister Tara Govind Sapre who won the bypoll.

He played a big role in establishing Maharashtra Industrial Development Corporation (MIDC). A prominent road intersection in Pune is named after him.
