= Mihir Kotecha =

Indian politician

Member of Legislative Assembly Maharashtra
- Incumbent
- Assumed office 2019
- Preceded by: Sardar Tara Singh
- Constituency: Mulund

Personal details
- Party: Bharatiya Janata Party
- Spouse: Payal Kotecha
- Profession: Politician

Mihir Chandrakant Kotecha is an Indian politician serving as Member of Maharashtra Legislative Assembly from Mulund since 2019. A member of the Bharatiya Janata Party, he previously served as the Vice President of BJP Mumbai and Youth Wing President before that.

Kotecha is a candidate in 2024 Indian General Election from Mumbai North East Lok Sabha Constituency.
