= Pramod Mahajan =

Indian politician

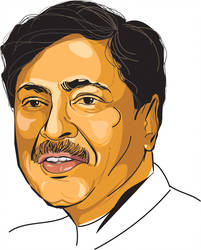

Union Minister of Communications and Information Technology
- In office 2 September 2001 – 28 January 2003
- Prime Minister: Atal Bihari Vajpayee
- Preceded by: Ram Vilas Paswan
- Succeeded by: Arun Shourie

Union Minister of Parliamentary Affairs
- In office 13 October 1999 – 29 January 2003
- Prime Minister: Atal Bihari Vajpayee
- Preceded by: Rangarajan Kumaramangalam
- Succeeded by: Sushma Swaraj
- In office 16 May 1996 – 1 June 1996
- Prime Minister: Atal Bihari Vajpayee
- Preceded by: Ghulam Nabi Azad
- Succeeded by: Ram Vilas Paswan

Union Minister of Defence
- In office 16 May 1996 – 1 June 1996
- Prime Minister: Atal Bihari Vajpayee
- Preceded by: P. V. Narasimha Rao
- Succeeded by: Mulayam Singh Yadav

Union Minister of Information and Broadcasting
- In office 5 December 1998 – 13 October 1999
- Prime Minister: Atal Bihari Vajpayee
- Preceded by: Sushma Swaraj
- Succeeded by: Arun Jaitley

Member of Parliament, Lok Sabha
- In office 10 May 1996 – 28 February 1998
- Preceded by: Gurudas Kamat
- Succeeded by: Gurudas Kamat
- Constituency: Mumbai North East

Member of Parliament, Rajya Sabha
- In office 5 July 1998 – 3 May 2006
- Preceded by: Sushil Kumar Shinde
- Succeeded by: Rahul Bajaj
- Constituency: Maharashtra
- In office 5 July 1986 – 10 May 1996
- Preceded by: Shanti Patel
- Succeeded by: Ram Kapse
- Constituency: Maharashtra

3rd President of Bharatiya Janata Yuva Morcha
- In office 1986–1988
- Preceded by: Satya Deo Singh
- Succeeded by: Rajnath Singh

Personal details
- Born: Pramod Venkatesh Mahajan; 30 October 1949 Mahbubnagar, Hyderabad State (present-day Telangana), India
- Died: 3 May 2006 (aged 56) Mumbai, Maharashtra, India
- Cause of death: Assassination by gunshots
- Party: Bharatiya Janata Party
- Spouse: Rekha Mahajan
- Children: Rahul Mahajan; Poonam Mahajan
- Relatives: Gopinath Munde (brother-in-law)
- As of 5 May 2006

Pramod Venkatesh Mahajan (30 October 1949 – 3 May 2006,) was an Indian politician from Maharashtra. A second-generation leader of the Bharatiya Janata Party (BJP), he belonged to a group of relatively young "technocratic" leaders.

He was a member of the Rajya Sabha and a General Secretary of his party. He contested only Lok Sabha elections from Mumbai – North East constituency. He won in 1996 but lost in 1998. As Prime Minister Atal Bihari Vajpayee's telecommunications minister between 2001 and 2003, he played a major role in India's cellular revolution. He was widely seen as a successful Parliamentary Affairs minister due to his good relations with members of political parties across the ideological spectrum.

On 22 April 2006, he was murdered by his brother Pravin Mahajan over a family dispute. He succumbed to his injury 13 days later. Pravin was sentenced to lifetime imprisonment by the court in 2007.

== Early life ==
Pramod Mahajan was born to Venkatesh Devidas Mahajan and Prabhavati Venkatesh Mahajan in Mahbubnagar, Telangana, India in a Deshastha Brahmin family. The Mahajan family had migrated from their home in Mahajan gully in Dharashiv to Ambajogai and were staying in a rented house in Mangalwar Peth. Mahajan spent his childhood in Ambejogai. He was the second child of his parents, with two brothers Prakash and Pravin, and two sisters Pratibha and Pradnya. His father died when he was 21. He attended Yogeshwari Vidyalaya and Mahavidyalaya in Beed district of Maharashtra and studied at the Ranade Institute for Journalism, Pune. He obtained bachelor's degrees in Physics and Journalism and a post graduate degree in Political Science. He with his future brother-in-law Gopinath Munde studied in Swami Ramanand Teerth College, Ambajogai, Maharashtra. He passed Maharashtra Certified Typewriting from former Mahajan Typewriting Institute, Ambajogai.

His love for theatre brought him close to Rekha Hamine, whom he courted and married on 11 March 1972. They have two children, daughter Poonam and son Rahul Mahajan. Both his children are trained pilots. His daughter is married to Anand Rao Vajendla, an industrialist from Hyderabad. Until his death he resided in Worli and shared the same floor of the apartment building with Gopinath Munde.

He worked as an English teacher at the Kholeshwar College in Ambejogai between 1971 and 1974 before joining active politics during the emergency.

== Political career ==
Mahajan was a member of Rashtriya Swayamsevak Sangh (RSS) since childhood, but he actively got involved when he worked as a sub-editor of its Marathi Newspaper, Tarun Bharat in 1970 and 1971. He quit his job as a school teacher and became a full-time RSS pracharak in 1974.

He took part in the agitation against the state of emergency imposed by the then Prime Minister Indira Gandhi and was incarcerated in the Nashik central jail until it was lifted. He was one of the select batch of RSS workers co-opted into the BJP and was the general secretary of the party's state unit till 1985. Between 1983 and 1985, he was also the All India Secretary of his party. After unsuccessfully contesting the 1984 Lok Sabha elections, he became the president of the All India Bharatiya Janata Yuva Morcha in 1986, a position he held again between 1990 and 1992. By virtue of his organizational skills and hard work, he rose to a prominent position, first in the Maharashtra state BJP and then at the national level.

Mahajan's aspirations were always national, but he also did a significant amount of work in building up his party's fortunes in his home state of Maharashtra. In this, he was partnered with his childhood friend-turned brother-in-law Gopinath Munde (who is married to his sister Pradnya). Mahajan was responsible for his party's alliance with the Shiv Sena. The alliance went on to win the state assembly elections in 1995 and ruled till 1999. Munde was the deputy chief minister in that government.

Mahajan came to play a vital role during the coalition era of the late 1980s. He rose to national prominence when he helped organize BJP President Lal Krishna Advani's Ram Rath Yatra in 1990.

Despite being credited with responsibility for his party's numerous election victories, Mahajan rarely contested or won popular elections himself. He had been elected to Parliament many times, but mostly through the Rajya Sabha, the indirectly elected upper house. He served in the Rajya Sabha in 1986–92, 1992–96, 1998–2004 and for the last time in 2004. He was elected to the Lok Sabha once in 1996 from Mumbai North East.

== Government ==
The Lok Sabha elections of 1996 brought the BJP to power and Mahajan was appointed Defence Minister in Vajpayee's 13-day ministry. When the BJP returned to power in 1998, he was first appointed as advisor to the Prime Minister. He resigned from that post and stood for Rajya Sabha elections in July 1998. He won and in December 1998, he was appointed the Minister for Information and Broadcasting, and Food Processing. A year later, in October 1999, he was moved to Parliamentary Affairs and Water Resources. He relinquished Water Resources a month later in November and took charge of Information Technology (in addition to Parliamentary Affairs).

In 2001, he was appointed to the Communications ministry under controversial circumstances. The earlier telecom policy of the government, formulated in 1994, had allowed private participation in cellular telephony after open bidding, on payment of a license fee determined through the bidding. However, after winning the contracts the telecom companies found themselves unable to pay the fixed license fees, supposedly because the victors fell victim to the Winner's curse. The then Minister for Communications, Jagmohan attempted tough action against the defaulting companies, but was sacked. After this, Prime Minister Vajpayee himself took over the cabinet portfolio (with Ram Vilas Paswan as minister of state) and oversaw the formulation of the New Telecom Policy of 1999. The policy replaced fixed license fees with a revenue sharing agreement, a move that was widely criticized for changing rules midway and causing loss of revenue to the government. Mahajan, who succeeded to the post in August 2001, after a cabinet reshuffle (that also merged the department of Information technology with the Telecommunications portfolio) had the task of implementing this policy.

During his tenure, the number of new telephone connections enjoyed unprecedented growth and rentals fell by a large amount. However, he was also accused of favouring Reliance Infocomm by allowing it to offer full nationwide mobility through WLL without payment of the required license fees.

He was also involved in a dispute with the then Disinvestment minister Arun Shourie over the privatization of VSNL. There was speculation that he was a casualty of the silent intra-party battle between Vajpayee and Advani. Shourie succeeded him to the Communications portfolio. Mahajan was appointed the General Secretary of the BJP. He contested media speculation that this was a demotion, saying that there were no differences between him and the party and that he had just changed positions from chariot rider to charioteer.

== Election history ==
=== Rajya Sabha ===
Position	Party	Constituency	From	To	Tenure
Member of Parliament, Rajya Sabha (1st Term)	BJP	Maharashtra	5 July 1986	4 July 1992	5 years, 365 days
Member of Parliament, Rajya Sabha (2nd Term)	BJP	Maharashtra	5 July 1992	9 May 1996	3 years, 309 days
Member of Parliament, Rajya Sabha (3rd Term)	BJP	Maharashtra	5 July 1998	4 July 2004	5 years, 365 days
Member of Parliament, Rajya Sabha (4th Term)	BJP	Maharashtra	5 July 2004	3 May 2006	1 year, 302 days

== Allegations for role in Shivani Bhatnagar's death ==
Mahajan was accused of orchestrating the murder of former Indian Express journalist Shivani Bhatnagar by Madhu Sharma, the wife of IPS officer Ravi Kant Sharma who was an accused in the murder and in police custody.

Bhatnagar was murdered on 23 January 1999. The investigation had gone on for three years and was out of the media spotlight till Sharma's arrest. His motive for the murder, according to the Delhi Police, was that he had fathered Bhatnagar's child and was under pressure from her to marry him. Madhu made statements in the press claiming that it was, in fact, Mahajan who had the affair and was the actual father. She challenged him to a DNA test. Mahajan agreed to take the test but eventually did not as the Delhi Police dismissed Sharma's claim as an emotional outburst as she was unable to provide any concrete evidence in support of her charges.

== 2003 and 2004 elections ==
Assembly elections were held in four Indian states in December 2003 – Delhi, Chhattisgarh, Madhya Pradesh and Rajasthan. Mahajan was put in charge of Rajasthan. The BJP consciously chose to play down the Hindutva platform. Nonetheless, the elections turned out to be a resounding victory for the BJP, which won in three of the four states. Emboldened by this success, Vajpayee called early elections in 2004 and Mahajan was given charge of the campaign. However, the BJP performed unexpectedly poorly in them, losing power to the Indian National Congress. Mahajan personally accepted responsibility for this defeat.

== Death ==
On the morning of 22 April 2006, Mahajan's estranged younger brother, Pravin shot him with his licensed .32 Browning pistol inside the former's apartment in Mumbai following a dispute. Four bullets were fired. Mahajan was taken to the Hinduja Hospital where he was operated upon. Liver specialist Mohamed Rela flew in from London to treat him. After struggling for his life for 13 days, Mahajan suffered from a cardiac arrest and died on 3 May 2006 at 16:10. He was given a state funeral at the Shivaji Park crematorium in Dadar, Mumbai on 4 May 2006.

== Aftermath ==
Pravin surrendered at the Worli Police Station in Mumbai after the shooting. The police claimed that it was a premeditated attack born out of resentment built up over a long time. Pravin accused his brother of "ignoring and humiliating him, and not giving him his due". He also felt neglected and suffered from an inferiority complex because he was the poorer younger brother of a much more famous elder brother. Pravin was charged with murder under Sec. 302 of the Indian Penal Code (IPC). However, Pravin told the court that he had not fired the bullets at his brother. On 18 December 2007, Pravin was sentenced to life imprisonment. Pravin died on 3 March 2010 due to brain haemorrhage. He was on parole when he suffered the stroke and was hospitalised.

== See also ==
- List of assassinated Indian politicians
