= Sapre =

Sapre is surname of Hindu Brahmin origin, found in regions of Ratnagiri, Pune, in Indian state of Maharashtra, but are also distributed in states of Goa, Karnataka, Madhya Pradesh, Tamil Nadu depending on Gotra (lineage). Variations of the surname include Sapir, Sapiro, Sapru, Shapiro.

== Notable people with surname Sapre ==
- Abhay Manohar Sapre (born 1954), Retd. Chief Justice of India, Judge of the Supreme Court of India, famously known for Adani- Hindenburg case
- Madhu Sapre (born 1971), International model, married to Italian businessman Gian Maria Emendatori,
- Bhagirathi Sapre (1828–1858), Mother of Queen of Jhansi, Rani Laxmibai (Manikarnika).
- Ramchandra Sapre (1915–1999), Indian chess champion, Botvinnik-Smyslov match in Russia in 1954
- Tara Govind Sapre (1919–1981), Indian politician
