= Ghatkopar East Assembly constituency =

Constituency of the Maharashtra legislative assembly in India

Coordinates: 19.08°N 72.91°E

Ghatkopar East
- Constituency No. 170 for the Maharashtra Legislative Assembly

Constituency details
- Country: India
- Region: Western India
- State: Maharashtra
- District: Mumbai Suburban
- Lok Sabha constituency: Mumbai North East
- Established: 2008
- Total electors: 249,577
- Reservation: None

Member of Legislative Assembly
- 15th Maharashtra Legislative Assembly
- Incumbent Parag Shah
- Party: Bharatiya Janata Party
- Elected year: 2024

Ghatkopar East Assembly constituency is one of the 26 Vidhan Sabha constituencies located in the Mumbai Suburban district.

== Overview ==
Ghatkopar East is part of the Mumbai North East Lok Sabha constituency along with five other Vidhan Sabha segments, namely Mulund, Ghatkopar West, Bhandup West, Mankhurd Shivaji Nagar and Vikhroli in the Mumbai Suburban district.

== Members of the Legislative Assembly ==
Year	Member	Party
1967	D. Samant	Republican Party of India
1972	R. Vishnunarayan Tripathi	Indian National Congress
1978	Parekh Jayantilal Ghambhirdas	Janata Party
1980	Liladhar Shamji Vyas	Indian National Congress
1985	Virendra Bakshi	Indian National Congress
1990	Prakash Mehta	Bharatiya Janata Party
1995	Prakash Mehta	Bharatiya Janata Party
1999	Prakash Mehta	Bharatiya Janata Party
2004	Prakash Mehta	Bharatiya Janata Party
Before 2009 See : Ghatkopar
2009	Prakash Mehta	Bharatiya Janata Party
2014	Prakash Mehta	Bharatiya Janata Party
2019	Parag Shah	Bharatiya Janata Party
2024	Parag Shah	Bharatiya Janata Party

== Election results ==
=== Assembly Election 2024 ===
2024 Maharashtra Legislative Assembly election : Ghatkopar East
Party	Candidate	Votes	%	±%
BJP	Parag Shah	85,388	57.78%	▼1.46
NCP-SP	Jadhav Rakhee Harishchandra	50,389	34.10%	New
MNS	Kulthe Sandeep Sudhakar	5,615	3.80%	▼12.20
VBA	Sunita Sanjay Gaikwad	3,892	2.63%	▼5.86
NOTA	None of the Above	1,719	1.16%	▼1.51
SWP	Hussain Lalmohammed Shaikh	1,592	1.08%	New
Margin of victory		34,999	23.68%	▼19.55
Turnout		149,493	59.90%	▲5.86
Total valid votes		147,774		
Registered electors		249,577		▲6.36
BJP hold		Swing	▼1.46	

=== Assembly Election 2019 ===
2019 Maharashtra Legislative Assembly election : Ghatkopar East
Party	Candidate	Votes	%	±%
BJP	Parag Shah	73,054	59.24%	▲10.70
MNS	Satish Sitaram Pawar	19,735	16.00%	▲10.43
INC	Manisha Sampatrao Surywanshi	15,753	12.77%	▼2.66
VBA	Vikas Damodar Pawar	10,472	8.49%	New
NOTA	None of the Above	3,297	2.67%	▲1.33
BSP	Adagale Vikram Popat	1,349	1.09%	▼1.21
Independent	Avinash Raghunath Kadam	837	0.68%	New
Independent	Madanlal Kedarnath Gupta	797	0.65%	New
Margin of victory		53,319	43.24%	▲14.17
Turnout		126,810	54.04%	▼1.51
Total valid votes		123,319		
Registered electors		234,656		▼5.57
BJP hold		Swing	▲10.70	

=== Assembly Election 2014 ===
2014 Maharashtra Legislative Assembly election : Ghatkopar East
Party	Candidate	Votes	%	±%
BJP	Prakash Mehta	67,012	48.54%	▲13.43
SS	Jagdish Chagan Chaudhari	26,885	19.48%	New
INC	Pravin Velji Chheda	21,303	15.43%	▼11.30
NCP	Rakhi Harishchandra Jadhav	10,471	7.59%	New
MNS	Satish Ratnakar Narkar	7,696	5.58%	▼15.63
BSP	Praksh Rajdev Sacchan	3,184	2.31%	▲0.73
NOTA	None of the Above	1,850	1.34%	New
Margin of victory		40,127	29.07%	▲20.68
Turnout		139,904	56.30%	▲4.00
Total valid votes		138,042		
Registered electors		248,501		▲3.18
BJP hold		Swing	▲13.43	

=== Assembly Election 2009 ===
2009 Maharashtra Legislative Assembly election : Ghatkopar East
Party	Candidate	Votes	%	±%
BJP	Prakash Mehta	43,600	35.12%	New
INC	Bakshi Virendra Rajpal	33,185	26.73%	New
MNS	Narkar Satish Ratnakar	26,323	21.20%	New
Independent	Raja Mirani	15,173	12.22%	New
BSP	Tupere Ram Vitthal	1,963	1.58%	New
RPI(A)	Namdeo Laxman Dhasal	1,672	1.35%	New
Margin of victory		10,415	8.39%	
Turnout		124,159	51.55%	
Total valid votes		124,156		
Registered electors		240,852		
BJP win (new seat)				

== See also ==
- List of constituencies of Maharashtra Vidhan Sabha
