= Ashok Patil =

Indian politician

Member of the Maharashtra Legislative Assembly
- Incumbent
- Assumed office 2024
- Preceded by: Ramesh Korgaonkar
- Constituency: Bhandup West
- In office 2014–2019
- Preceded by: Shishir Shinde
- Succeeded by: Ramesh Korgaonkar
- Constituency: Bhandup West

Personal details
- Party: Shiv Sena

Ashok Dharmaraj Patil is a Shiv Sena politician from Mumbai, Maharashtra. He is a Member of Legislative Assembly from Bhandup Vidhan Sabha constituency of Mumbai, Maharashtra, India as a member of Shiv Sena. He is former chairman of Mumbai's premium transport service Brihanmumbai Electric Supply and Transport (BEST).

On 3 February 2017, the Bombay High Court criticized Patil for trying to delay the progress of the approved slum redevelopment project by pursuing the cause of non-cooperating members.

== Positions held ==
- 2012: Elected as corporator in Brihanmumbai Municipal Corporation
- 2012: Chairman of Brihanmumbai Electric Supply and Transport(BEST)
- 2014: Elected to Maharashtra Legislative Assembly
- 2024: Re-elected to Maharashtra Legislative Assembly

== See also ==
- Mumbai North East Lok Sabha constituency
