= Liladhar Dake =

Indian politician

Minister of Industry Government of Maharashtra
- In office 14 March 1995 – 17 October 1999
- Chief Minister: Manohar Joshi; Narayan Rane
- Preceded by: Jawaharlal Darda
- Succeeded by: Patangrao Kadam

Member of Maharashtra Legislative Assembly
- In office 1990–2004
- Preceded by: Vaman Sherekar
- Succeeded by: Sanjay Dina Patil
- Constituency: Bhandup

Personal details
- Party: Shiv Sena
- Parent: Balaji Dake (father)

Liladhar Dake is a leader of Shiv Sena. He is a former cabinet minister in the Government of Maharashtra. He was elected to the Maharashtra Legislative Assembly in 1990, 1995 and 1999 elections from Bhandup Assembly constituency. He held the Industries portfolio in the cabinet headed by Manohar Joshi.
