= Kirit Somaiya =

Indian politician (born 1954)

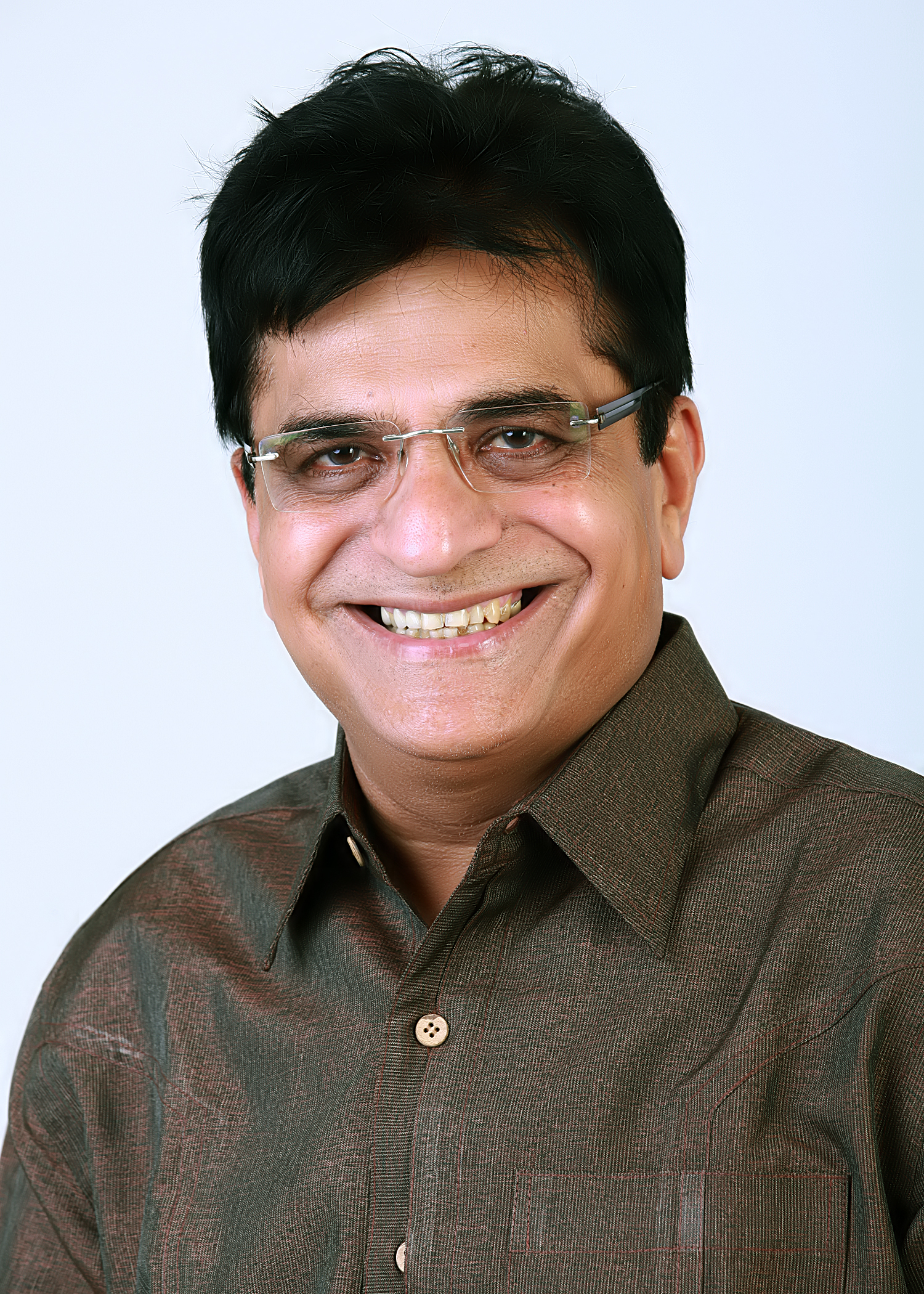

Vice President, Bharatiya Janata Party, Maharashtra
- Incumbent
- Assumed office Aug 2019

Member of Parliament, Lok Sabha
- In office May 2014 – 23 May 2019
- Preceded by: Sanjay Dina Patil
- Succeeded by: Manoj Kotak
- Constituency: Mumbai North East
- In office 1999–2004
- Preceded by: Gurudas Kamat
- Succeeded by: Gurudas Kamat
- Constituency: Mumbai North East

Member of Legislative Assembly, Maharashtra
- In office 1995–1999
- Preceded by: Vamanrao Parab
- Succeeded by: Sardar Tara Singh
- Constituency: Mulund

Personal details
- Born: 12 February 1954 (age 72) Bombay, Bombay State, India (Present day Mumbai, Maharashtra, India)
- Party: Bharatiya Janata Party
- Spouse: Medha Somaiya
- Children: 1
- Education: Institute of Chartered Accountants of India (Chartered Accountants); University of Mumbai (PhD in Finance)
- Website: kiritsomaiya.com
- As of 31 March, 2015

Kirit Somaiya (born 12 February 1954) is an Indian politician of the Bharatiya Janata Party who represented Mumbai North-East in the 16th Lok Sabha and the 13th Lok Sabha. He is currently appointed as the vice president of Bharatiya Janata Party's Maharashtra unit.

== Early life and education ==
Somaiya was born and brought up in Mumbai in a middle-class family. He graduated as a Chartered accountant from the Institute of Chartered Accountants of India (ICAI) in 1979 and also secured a rank in the All India Merit List. He married Medha Somaiya and they have one son. His son, Neil, also joined BJP and is the Municipal Councillor from Ward 108 Mulund.

== Political career ==
As a student activist, Somaiya took part in the Jayprakash Narayan's Bihar Movement in 1975 when a state of national emergency was declared in the country. Later on, he joined the BJP and represented the Mulund Vidhan Sabha Constituency of Maharashtra Legislative Assembly and the Mumbai North-East Lok Sabha Constituency.

In 1995, Somaiya contested in the Maharashtra Assembly elections and got elected from the Mulund assembly where he won by a margin of 43,527 votes. As a M.L.A., he got 2 major Acts passed in the Maharashtra Assembly - Small Investors’ Protection Act of Maharashtra, Repealing Coroners Court (Post Mortem) Act and introduced the Housing Society Conveyance Bill.

In 1999 Lok Sabha election, Somaiya defeated the incumbent Gurudas Kamat of the Indian National Congress by a margin of 7,276 votes. As a parliamentarian, he submitted the maximum number of petitions to the parliament, i.e. 11 (out of 27 total petitions presented in 13th Lok Sabha) during his tenure in Lok Sabha which was the highest number of petitions submitted by any MP in the history of Indian Parliament. He was an active member of the house where during his tenure he raised a total of 832 questions in the house on several issues.

On 27 February 2014, the BJP announced its first list of candidates for the 2014 Lok Sabha Elections and Somaiya was fielded as the BJP candidate from Mumbai North East. He defeated the incumbent Sanjay Dina Patil of the Sharad Pawar led Nationalist Congress Party by a large margin of 317,122 votes.

On 18 July 2023, Marathi news channel "Lokshahi" claimed possession of multiple videos allegedly featuring Kirit Somaiya in compromising positions, causing shockwaves throughout the political landscape. Kirit Somaiya refuted the allegations and requested Maharashtra Home Minister Devendra Fadnavis to investigate the incident.

== Positions held ==
- Member of Parliament, Lok Sabha (1999-2004, 2014–2019)
- MLA - Maharashtra Legislative Assembly (1995–1999)
- Vice President – Maharashtra BJP
- Chairperson, Standing Committee on Energy (2014–2016)
- Member, Consultative Committee, Ministry of Railways (2000–2004)

== Social and political contributions ==
As the National convener of the Anti-Corruption – Scam Expose Committee of the BJP, Somaiya ran a Nationwide campaign against corruption of the ruling UPA Government and its allies where he travelled through 16 states and 100 districts exposing several scams. He has, however, been characteristically silent on scams and corruption within his own party like the Yeddyurappa scandal.

Some of the scams Somaiya has exposed /pursued include the NSEL case, Coal mining scam, Maharashtra Sadan Scam, Adarsh Scam, Wheat Scam, DMAT scam, and Maharashtra Irrigation Scam.

As a People's Activist, Somaiya has made several contributions, both Social and political in nature. He founded the NGO "Yuvak Pratishthan" which has been active for over 3 decades in taking up several initiatives such as Slum Rehabilitation, Cheap and Accessible Healthcare for all, Promotion of Education and Sports.
