= Abu Azmi =

Indian politician

Abu Asim Azmi

Maharashtra State President of Samajwadi Party
- Incumbent
- Assumed office 1995

Member of the Maharashtra Legislative Assembly
- Incumbent
- Assumed office 13 October 2009
- Preceded by: constituency created
- Constituency: Mankhurd Shivaji Nagar

Member of Parliament Rajya Sabha
- In office 2002–2008
- Constituency: Uttar Pradesh

Personal details
- Born: 8 August 1955 (age 71) Azamgarh, Uttar Pradesh, India
- Party: Samajwadi Party
- Children: Farhan Azmi (son), Bushra Azmi (daughter), Farzeen Azmi (daughter), Shehwar Azmi (daughter), Rushda Azmi (daughter), Shehma Azmi (daughter)
- Relatives: Ayesha Takia (daughter-in-law)
- Education: Veer Bahadur Singh Purvanchal University
- Occupation: Politician, businessman
- Website: www.abuasimazmi.com

Abu Asim Azmi (born 8 August 1955) is a member of the Maharashtra Legislative Assembly. He represents the Mankhurd Shivaji Nagar Constituency, Mumbai. He belongs to the Samajwadi Party.

He is the President of the Maharashtra state branch of the Samajwadi Party. He currently represents Mankhurd Shivaji Nagar of Mumbai Suburban District in the Maharashtra Legislative Assembly.

== Politics ==
Azmi entered politics and in 1995, under his leadership, the Samajwadi Party (SP) won two seats in the Maharashtra state assembly. In 2004, entering his first election cycle, Azmi was defeated by Yogesh Patil of the Shiv Sena from Bhiwandi constituency. From 2002 to 2008, Azmi was the Member of Parliament (MP) for Rajya Sabha.

In the 2009 Lok Sabha election, Azmi was defeated by Gurudas Kamat (Congress). However, in 2009, Azmi was elected to the Maharashtra Assembly where he served for two terms. He successfully contested the seats of Mankhurd-Shivaji Nagar and Bhiwandi (East), and under rules limiting successful candidates to one region, he chose Mankhurd-Shivaji Nagar.

Azmi is the only MLA from Maharashtra to have won from 2 seats simultaneously in one election.

Azmi has secured three consecutive wins in his Mankhurd Shivaji Nagar Constituency from 2009 to 2024.

== Members of Legislative Assembly ==
Key

SP

Election	Assembly Constituency	Member	Party
2009	Mankhurd-Shivaji Nagar	Abu Azmi	Samajwadi Party
2014	Mankhurd-Shivaji Nagar	Abu Azmi	Samajwadi Party
2019	Mankhurd-Shivaji Nagar	Abu Azmi	Samajwadi Party
2024	Mankhurd-Shivaji Nagar	Abu Azmi	Samajwadi Party

== Controversies and Criticism ==
=== Clash with MNS ===
On 9 November 2009, Azmi was denounced and prevented by several MLAs of the MNS from taking his oath in Hindi and not in state official language Marathi. As a result of this incident, the speaker of the Maharashtra Legislative Assembly suspended the 4 MNS MLAs involved in the skirmish for a period of four years. The suspension was later revoked in July 2010.

In December 2013, Azmi expressed disappointment after seeing Bollywood megastar Amitabh Bachchan share dais with Raj Thackeray.

=== Maharashtra assembly suspension ===
On 5 March 2025, Azmi was suspended from Maharashtra assembly for his remarks praising Aurangzeb. A case against Azmi was registered by the Mumbai Police under sections 299, 302, 356 (1), and 356 (2) of the Bharatiya Nyaya Sanhita. He was granted an anticipatory bail by the civil sessions court for his comments. SP party head Akhilesh Yadav questioned the suspension and said, "If some people think that by ‘suspension’ they can silence the truth, then it reflects their childish and negative thinking."
