= Ram Kadam =

Indian politician

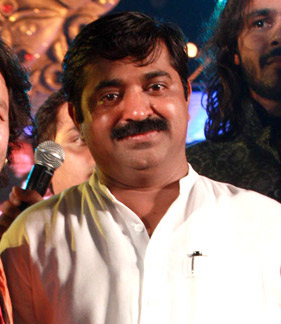

Member of the Maharashtra Legislative Assembly
- Incumbent
- Assumed office October 2009
- Preceded by: constituency established
- Constituency: Ghatkopar West

Personal details
- Born: Ram Shivaji Kadam; 24 January 1972 (age 54) Latur, Maharashtra, India
- Party: Bharatiya Janata Party (2014–present)
- Other political affiliations: Maharashtra Navnirman Sena (till 2014)
- Parent: Shivaji Vishwanath Kadam
- Occupation: Politician

Ram Shivaji Kadam (born 24 January 1972) is an Indian former social activist and politician, currently belonging to the Bharatiya Janata Party (BJP). He has been elected MLA for the Ghatkopar West Vidhan Sabha constituency in 2009, 2014, and 2019.

== Political career ==
Little is known about education of Ram Kadam. Kadam joined MNS in 2009 and was elected as MLA of Ghatkopar West. In 2014, he left MNS and joined Bharatiya Janata Party & fought 2014 Vidhansabha elections of BJP ticket. He secured a handsome victory. In June 2019, Kadam said “Devendra Fadnavis would be the next CM of Maharashtra” after rumblings from alliance partner. He won the Vidhan Sabha election in October 2019.

When he became MLA for the first time in 2009, as a member of the MNS party, he was suspended for 4 years from the assembly on its opening day. He opposed Abu Asim Azmi of the Samajwadi Party taking the oath in Hindi, and assaulted Azmi. Kadam left MNS in 2014 and joined BJP.

== Social service ==
He started free 'odomos' distribution to watchmen, liftmen working night shifts in Mumbai. He has also organized pilgrimage tour to Tirupati and driving classes for youngsters registering as first time voters.

=== Kashi Pilgrimage ===
He will organize free pilgrimage tour to Kashi for 51,000 elderly people. In past also, he has organized pilgrimage tours of approximately 175,000 people to Kashi, Ajmer Sharif, Palitana, Nashik Shirdi.

=== Dahi Handis ===
He organizes Dahi Handis with highest prize in Mumbai. His Dahi Handi events are always visited by Bollywood stars like Ranveer Singh, Arjun Rampal and Neha Dhupia in the past.

=== Jalyukta Shivir ===
He is said to have been instrumental in bringing water trains from Jaldoot to Latur during the 2015 drought. He undertook several works of Jalyukta Shivir.
