= Yashodhar Phanse =

Indian politician

Yeshodhar Phanse

Standing Committee Chairman, Brihanmumbai Municipal Corporation
- In office 2014–2017
- Preceded by: Rahul Shewale
- Succeeded by: Ramesh Korgaonkar

Public Health Committee Chairman, Brihanmumbai Municipal Corporation
- In office 2005–2006

Improvement Committee Chairman, Brihanmumbai Municipal Corporation
- In office 2007–2010

Personal details
- Born: 1962 (age 63–64) Mumbai, Maharashtra
- Party: Shiv Sena

Yeshodhar Phanse is an Indian politician from Mumbai belonging to Shiv Sena. He is a loyalist at the party. He is a three-time chairman of the standing committee of the Brihanmumbai Municipal Corporation (BMC), the municipal corporation of the city of Mumbai. He has held the position since April 2014. He first became corporator in 2002. He has held the position of the Chairman of the Health committee and has become Chairman of the development committee three times. From 2012 to 2014, he held the position of the leader of the house. He had also served as chairman of various BMC Committees such as Public Health Committee, Improvement Committee etc.

== Positions held ==
- 2002: First elected as corporator in Brihanmumbai Municipal Corporation
- 2005: Elected as Chairman of Public Health Committee Brihanmumbai Municipal Corporation
- 2007: Elected as corporator in Brihanmumbai Municipal Corporation
- 2007: Elected as Chairman of Improvement Committee Brihanmumbai Municipal Corporation
- 2012: Re-elected as corporator in Brihanmumbai Municipal Corporation
- 2012: Appointed leader of the house
- 2014: Elected as Standing Committee Chairman Brihanmumbai Municipal Corporation [1st term]
- 2015 : Re-elected as Standing Committee Chairman Brihanmumbai Municipal Corporation [2nd term]
- 2016 : Re-elected as Standing Committee Chairman Brihanmumbai Municipal Corporation [3rd term]
