= Shivani Bhatnagar =

Indian journalist and writer

- Born: India
- Died: January 23, 1999; East Delhi, India
- Occupation: Writer at Indian Express
- Spouse: Rakesh Bhatnagar
- Children: Tanmay Bhatnagar

Shivani Bhatnagar (assassinated 23 January 1999) was an Indian journalist who worked for the Indian Express newspaper. She was murdered on 23 January 1999 by an IPS officer, Ravi Kant Sharma, and her death was the subject of widespread sensationalist media coverage.

== The case ==
Bhatnagar's murder on 23 January 1999 became a scandal that reached the top levels of Indian politics. Indian Police Service (IPS) officer Ravi Kant Sharma was charged with the murder by the Delhi Police, who investigated the case. Sharma surrendered to the police on 27 September 2002, after remaining in hiding for weeks after the arrest warrant was issued on 3 August. Sharma allegedly killed Bhatnagar because he feared she would expose their "intimate" relations.

IPS officer Ravi Kant Sharma along with Sri Bhagwan Sharma, Satya Prakash and Pradeep Sharma (Note: Not to be confused with the namesake police officer) were accused in the Shivani Bhatnagar murder case and they were convicted by a Delhi Trial Court on 18 March 2008. Two other accused—Dev Prakash Sharma and Ved Prakash alias Kalu—were acquitted for want of evidence. Those convicted were sentenced to life imprisonment on 24 March 2008. On 12 October 2011 Delhi High Court acquitted Ravi Kant Sharma, Sri Bhagwan Sharma and Satya Prakash on appeal, citing lack of evidence. The conviction of Pradeep Sharma was upheld.

Bhatnagar was a writer for The Indian Express. She was married to Rakesh Bhatnagar and mother to Tanmay Bhatnagar. Shivani Bhatnagar was said to be friends with Ravi Kant Sharma and it was an acknowledged relationship known by Rakesh Bhatnagar and Ravi Kant Sharma's wife, Madhu. Madhu had accused BJP leader Pramod Mahajan of having intimate relations with Shivani and he was involved in the murder as a refute against her husband's accusations. Mahajan was found not guilty by the Delhi Police and he denied having any type of relationship with Shivani other than a professional one.

Ravi Kant Sharma was charged by prosecutors for murdering Shivani Bhatnagar for reasons that she had legal documents that he had leaked to her and she was not willing to return those to him. It was said that she had some politically sensitive documents, relating to the St Kitts case, that she was not going to give back to Sharma and was threatening to expose him for it, so he executed her murder. Ravi Kant Sharma denied these allegations and was accused of having intimate relations with Shivani. It was theorized that Shivani wanted to reveal their relationship but he did not agree so she threatened to expose it, and before doing so, Sharma had gotten her killed so she would not ruin his social status.

== The trial ==
The trial was held for the suspended IPS officer, Ravi Kant Sharma and Pradeep Sharma, who was allegedly hired by Ravi Kant Sharma to kill Shivani Bhatnagar. The trial consisted of the prosecutors debating whether the plaintiffs deserved the death penalty or life sentence. The remaining three convicts, Sri Bhagawan, Ved Prakash Sharma, (Note: Not to be confused with the namesake writer) and Satya Prakash were also requested to be given a life sentence. Enough evidence was found between linked phone call records between Ravi Kant Sharma and Pradeep Sharma to prove that they were the cause for her death and had been conspiring a plan.

An ongoing 9-year trial that has had over 209 witnesses, 4 judges, and has over 20,000 pages of records running resulted with Ravi Kant Sharma on 12 October 2011 being acquitted by the High Courts after being in jail for nine years (since 2002 when he surrendered himself in to the police) and the other convicts were deemed not guilty as well due to lack of evidence. However, Pradeep Sharma was jailed for almost four years from 2009 to 2013. Pradeep was arrested due to the evidence found of his handwriting found at the register of Shivani's apartment block which allowed him to gain access to the apartment complex. Along with this, his fingerprints were found at the crime scene, in Shivani's apartment.

There were many instances where the evidence was deemed as ineffective or was questioned on reliability. The phone calls between Ravi Kant Sharma and Pradeep Sharma were nicknamed PW135/28 and they won Shri Bhagwan acquittal as they held a lot of suspicion about its authenticity. Ravi Kant Sharma pleaded that the phone calls were tampered with by the police and cannot be relied on and this was further looked into by the court. The court states that since the records are not a directly available data from the telephone company, they appear as documents that could have been tampered with, so they did not charge Ravi Kant Sharma.
