= Sanjay Dina Patil =

Indian politician

Member of Parliament, Lok Sabha
- Incumbent
- Assumed office 4 June 2024
- Preceded by: Manoj Kotak
- Constituency: Mumbai North East
- In office 16 May 2009 – 16 May 2014
- Preceded by: Gurudas Kamat
- Succeeded by: Kirit Somaiya
- Constituency: Mumbai North East

Member of Maharashtra Legislative Assembly
- In office 2004–2009
- Preceded by: Liladhar Dake
- Succeeded by: Shishir Shinde
- Constituency: Bhandup

Personal details
- Born: 16 January 1969 (age 57) Mumbai, Maharashtra, India
- Party: Shiv Sena (June 2026-Present), (2019-2022)
- Other political affiliations: Shiv Sena(UBT) (2022-2026); Nationalist Congress Party (Till 2019)
- Spouse: Pallavi Patil
- Children: Rajool Sanjay Patil, Sakhi Sanjay Patil

Sanjay Dina Patil (born 16 January 1969) is an Indian politician from Mumbai who is currently in 18th Lok Sabha Member as a Member of Parliament. He was elected to Maharashtra State assembly in 2004 from Bhandup. In 2009, he was elected to the 15th Lok Sabha from Mumbai North East constituency, Maharashtra state in India, as a Nationalist Congress Party candidate. He lost the re-election for the same seat in 2014. He was succeeded by Kirit Somaiya of the Bharatiya Janata Party of India.

Sanjay Dina Patil joined Shiv Sena on 4 October 2019.

His father Dina Bama Patil was MLA from Mulund in 1985. Dina(nath) Patil had also contested elections to Vidhan Sabha unsuccessfully from Bhandup in 1978 and 1990 as Congress candidate.

== Positions held ==
- 2004: Elected to Maharashtra Legislative Assembly
- 2009: Elected to 15th Lok Sabha Mumbai North East
- 2024: Elected to 18th Lok Sabha Mumbai North East
