= Ramesh Korgaonkar =

Indian politician

- रमेश कोरगावकर

Member of Maharashtra Legislative Assembly
- In office 2019–2024
- Preceded by: Ashok Patil
- Constituency: Bhandup West

Standing Committee Chairman, Brihanmumbai Municipal Corporation
- In office March 2017 – March 2018
- Preceded by: Yashodhar Phanse

Personal details
- Party: Shiv Sena (Uddhav Balasaheb Thackeray)

Ramesh Korgaonkar (Marathi: रमेश कोरगावकर) was Shiv Sena (Uddhav Balasaheb Thackeray) politician from Mumbai, Maharashtra. He was MLA in Maharashtra Legislative Assembly from Bhandup West Vidhan Sabha constituency as a member of Shiv Sena (Uddhav Balasaheb Thackeray).

== Positions held ==
- 2002: Elected as corporator in Brihanmumbai Municipal Corporation (BMC) (1st term)
- 2007: Re-elected as corporator in Brihanmumbai Municipal Corporation (2nd term)
- 2012: Re-elected as corporator in Brihanmumbai Municipal Corporation (3rd term)
- 2012: Elected as Chairman of Civil Works (suburbs) Committee Brihanmumbai Municipal Corporation
- 2017: Re-elected as corporator in Brihanmumbai Municipal Corporation (4th term)
- 2017: Elected as Standing Committee Chairman Brihanmumbai Municipal Corporation
- 2019: Elected to Maharashtra Legislative Assembly
