= Mankhurd Shivaji Nagar Assembly constituency =

Constituency of the Maharashtra legislative assembly in India

Coordinates: 19.065°N 72.924°E

Mankhurd Shivaji Nagar
- Constituency No. 171 for the Maharashtra Legislative Assembly

Constituency details
- Country: India
- Region: Western India
- State: Maharashtra
- District: Mumbai Suburban
- Lok Sabha constituency: Mumbai North East
- Established: 2008
- Total electors: 334,203
- Reservation: None

Member of Legislative Assembly
- 15th Maharashtra Legislative Assembly
- Incumbent Abu Azmi
- Party: SP
- Alliance: INDIA
- Elected year: 2024

Mankhurd Shivaji Nagar Assembly constituency is one of the 288 Vidhan Sabha (Legislative Assembly) constituencies of Maharashtra state in western India.

== Overview ==
Mankhurd Shivaji Nagar constituency is one of the 26 Vidhan Sabha constituencies located in the Mumbai Suburban district.

Mankhurd Shivaji Nagar is a part of the Mumbai North East Lok Sabha constituency along with five other Vidhan Sabha segments, namely Vikhroli, Ghatkopar West, Ghatkopar East, Mulund and Bhandup West in the Mumbai Suburban district.

Samajwadi Party MLA Shri Abu Asim Azmi had secured three consecutive wins in the Mankhurd Shivaji Nagar constituency facing tough competition with opposition parties like Shiv Sena, Vanchit Bahujan Aghadi, Indian National Congress and independent candidates like Mohammad Siraj Mohammad Iqbal.

== Members of the Legislative Assembly ==
Year	Member	Party
Till 2009 : Constituency did not exist
2009	Abu Azmi	Samajwadi Party
2014	Abu Azmi	Samajwadi Party
2019	Abu Azmi	Samajwadi Party
2024	Abu Azmi	Samajwadi Party

== Election results ==
=== Assembly Election 2024 ===
2024 Maharashtra Legislative Assembly election : Mankhurd Shivaji Nagar
Party	Candidate	Votes	%	±%
SP	Abu Asim Azmi	54,780	31.60	▼17.22
AIMIM	Ateeque Ahmad Khan	42,027	24.24	New
SS	Suresh (Bullet) Patil	35,263	20.34	▼10.38
NCP	Nawab Malik	15,501	8.94	New
VBA	Mohammed Siraj Shaikh	10,479	6.04	▼1.35
MNS	Jagadish Yashwant Khandekar	5,414	3.12	New
Independent	Waseem Javed Khan	3,689	2.13	New
NOTA	None of the Above	1,213	0.70	▼0.63
Margin of victory		12,753	7.36	▼10.73
Turnout		174,574	52.24	▲5.40
Total valid votes		173,361		
Registered electors		334,203		▲9.75
SP hold		Swing	▼17.22	

=== Assembly Election 2019 ===
2019 Maharashtra Legislative Assembly election : Mankhurd Shivaji Nagar
Party	Candidate	Votes	%	±%
SP	Abu Asim Azmi	69,082	48.82	▲15.85
SS	Vithal Govind Lokare	43,481	30.73	▲5.61
VBA	Suraiya Akbar Shaikh	10,465	7.39	New
Independent	Md. Siraj Md. Iqbal Shaikh	9,789	6.92	New
Independent	Khot Ravindra Krishna	3,288	2.32	New
BSP	Maruti (Dada) Dharma Gaikwad	2,733	1.93	New
NOTA	None of the Above	1,876	1.33	▲0.27
Independent	Khurshed Nazir Khan	949	0.67	New
Margin of victory		25,601	18.09	▲10.24
Turnout		143,886	47.25	▲5.57
Total valid votes		141,515		
Registered electors		304,526		▼1.58
SP hold		Swing	▲15.85	

=== Assembly Election 2014 ===
2014 Maharashtra Legislative Assembly election : Mankhurd Shivaji Nagar
Party	Candidate	Votes	%	±%
SP	Abu Asim Azmi	41,719	32.97	▼0.68
SS	Suresh Krushnarao Patil	31,782	25.12	▲18.99
INC	Abrahani Yusuf	27,494	21.73	▲0.44
NCP	Rajendra Waman Waghmare	5,632	4.45	New
AIMIM	Altaf Kazi	4,505	3.56	New
MNS	Suhail Syed Ashraf	3,649	2.88	▼16.24
PWPI	Ranjeet Varma	3,108	2.46	New
NOTA	None of the Above	1,338	1.06	New
Margin of victory		9,937	7.85	▼4.51
Turnout		127,894	41.33	▼1.28
Total valid votes		126,543		
Registered electors		309,419		▲14.24
SP hold		Swing	▼0.68	

=== Assembly Election 2009 ===
2009 Maharashtra Legislative Assembly election : Mankhurd Shivaji Nagar
Party	Candidate	Votes	%	±%
SP	Abu Asim Azmi	38,435	33.65	New
INC	Dr. Syed Ahmed	24,318	21.29	New
MNS	Appasaheb Bhimrao Wagare	21,838	19.12	New
Independent	Patil Suresh Krishnarao	9,436	8.26	New
SS	Shahid Reza Beg	6,991	6.12	New
BSP	Singh Shailendra Singh Bakebizari	3,267	2.86	New
Independent	Kamble Ramesh Suresh	1,580	1.38	New
Margin of victory		14,117	12.36	
Turnout		114,221	42.17	
Total valid votes		114,221		
Registered electors		270,843		
SP win (new seat)				

== Environment ==
Mankhurd Shivaji Nagar has India's oldest and largest landfill, Deonar Dumping Ground. It is used to dump the majority of solid waste of Mumbai which is causing various health issues in the region. The current MLA, Abu Azmi Azmi, is fighting with the Maharashtra Government over stopping the dumping of solid waste at Deonar Dumping Ground. SMS Envoclean Pvt Ltd, Common Biomedical waste Treatment Plant is burning biomedical waste here, which is also dangerous for residents. An Organization Govandi New Sangam Welfare Society fighting in Bombay High Court to relocate that plant from Govandi to MIDC by means of Public Interest Litigation (PIL).

== See also ==
- Mankhurd
- Deonar Dumping Ground
- List of constituencies of Maharashtra Vidhan Sabha
