= Sadabhau Khot =

Indian politician

Minister of State for Agriculture and horticulture and Marketing Government of Maharashtra
- In office 8 July 2016 – October 2019

Member of Maharashtra Legislative Council
- Incumbent
- Assumed office 10 June 2016
- Preceded by: Shobha Fadnavis
- Constituency: Elected by MLAs

Personal details
- Party: Rayat Kranti Sanghatana (2016-Present)
- Other political affiliations: Swabhimani Paksha (Before 2017)

Sadabhau Khot (born 1 June 1964) is a politician from Maharashtra state of India. He was President of Rayat Kranti Sanghtna. He contested 2014 Lok sabha elections from Madha (Lok Sabha constituency) as SWP /NDA candidate. He was elected unopposed as Member of legislative council from Maharashtra legislative assembly members seat on 10 June 2016. On 8 July he was inducted into Minister council as a Minister of state in Maharashtra government. He was given charge of agricultural, horticulture and marketing Ministry.
