= Yogesh Patil =

Indian politician

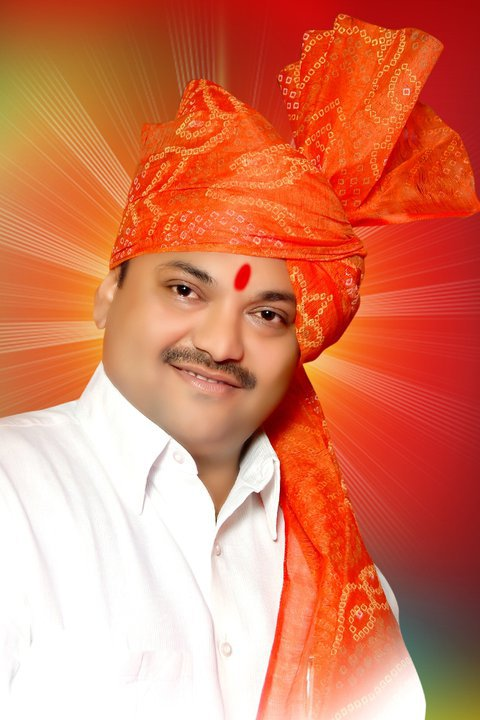
Img.yogesh patil

Yogesh Patil (born 26 June 1972) is an Indian politician from Maharashtra state and belongs to the Shiv Sena. He has served from 2004 to 2009 as the Member of Legislative Assembly (MLA) of Bhiwandi constituency of the state of Maharashtra.

Born and raised in an Agri(caste) Hindu family, Patil became both a student leader and a skilled kabaddi player. He is an alumnus of Mumbai University, where he was a university representative and a student leader.
