= Shiwajirao Nalawade =

Indian politician

Shiwajirao Vishnu Nalawade
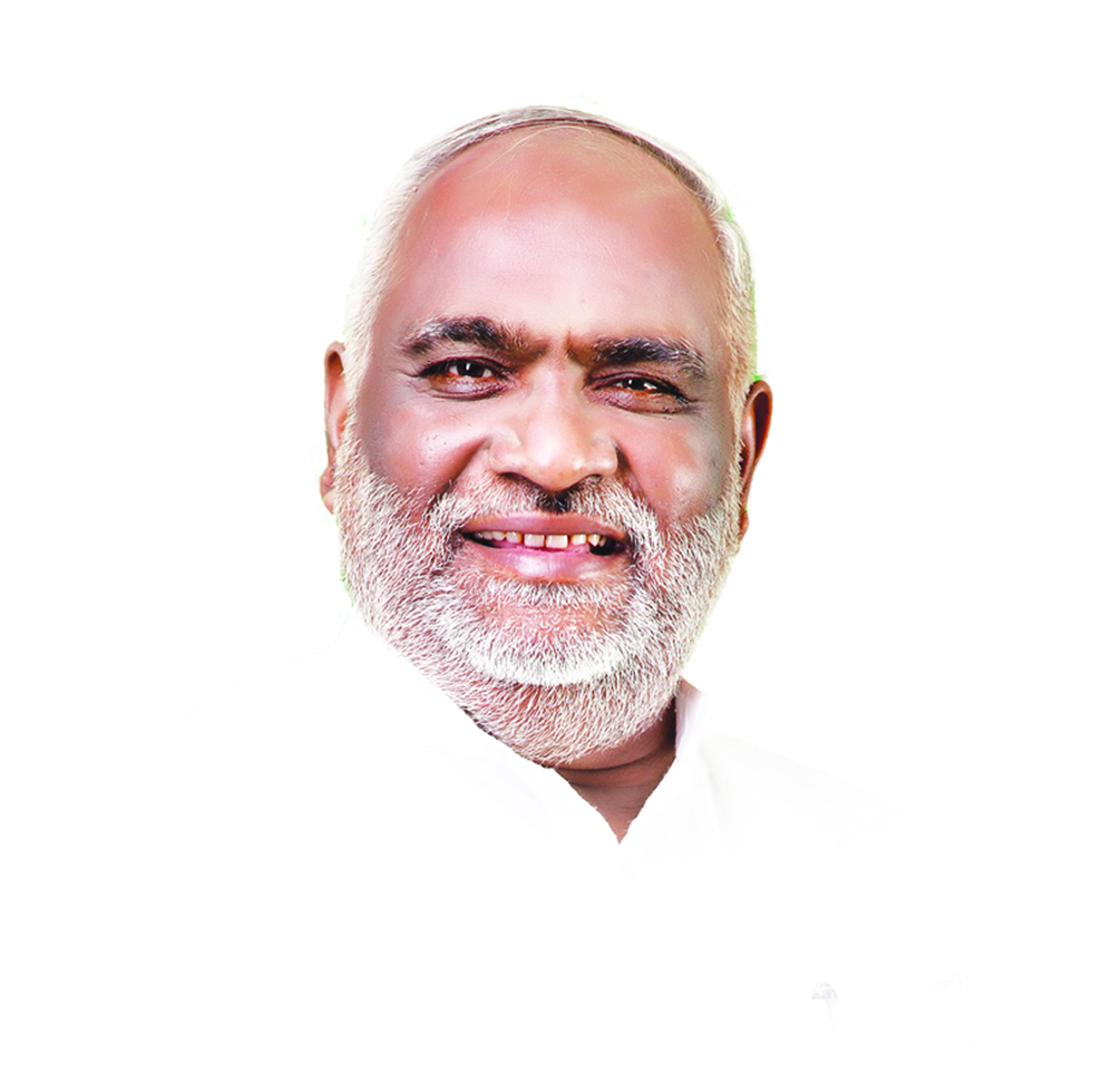
- Born: Shiwajirao Vishnu Nalawade; June 1, 1954 (age 71); Mumbai

Shiwajirao Vishnu Nalawade (born 1 June 1954) founder President of Mumbai North East District Nationalist Congress Party (NCP). Later, he also served as the vice-president of NCP, Mumbai Region.

== Early life and education ==
Nalawade was born on 1 June 1954 to Vishnu Genuji Nalawade and Vithabai Vishnu Nalawade. His father Vishnu Genuji Nalawade, was an employee of Firestone Rubber Company in Mumbai. His mother Vithabai looked after the family farm at Dholwad taluka, Junnar District, Pune in Maharashtra State. He completed his school at Shivneri Vidyalay Dholwad. Later, he did his graduation in arts at Ramniranjan Jhunjhunwala Night College, Ghatkopar-West, Mumbai.

He married Sarita Nalawade and they have three children.

== Career ==
He was nominated to contest as an MLC representing NCP in May 2024 from Mumbai Teachers constituency. He lost the election.

=== Leadership at trade union ===
In 1972, Nalawade started his career in Larsen & Toubro, Powai, Mumbai as a helper to clerk. He was active in the trade union activities. He started as a shop committee member and became a general secretary. He led over 7000 workers under the flag of "Bharatiya Kamgar Sena Union" until 1981. Later, he formed his own workers' union, "Kamgar Kranti Sanghatan Union", for the unorganized labour sector.

In 1993, he was elected as a Director at Mumbai District Central Co-operative Bank Ltd Mumbai.He also started a monthly co-operative magazine named "Patsanstha Pariwar" on 13 November 2000.

=== First ever generic medical shop ===
On 14 January 2013, he opened the first ever generic medicine shop named as "Janadhar Medical and General Stores" in Ghatkopar (West), Maharashtra.
