= Prakash Mehta =

Indian politician (born 1959)

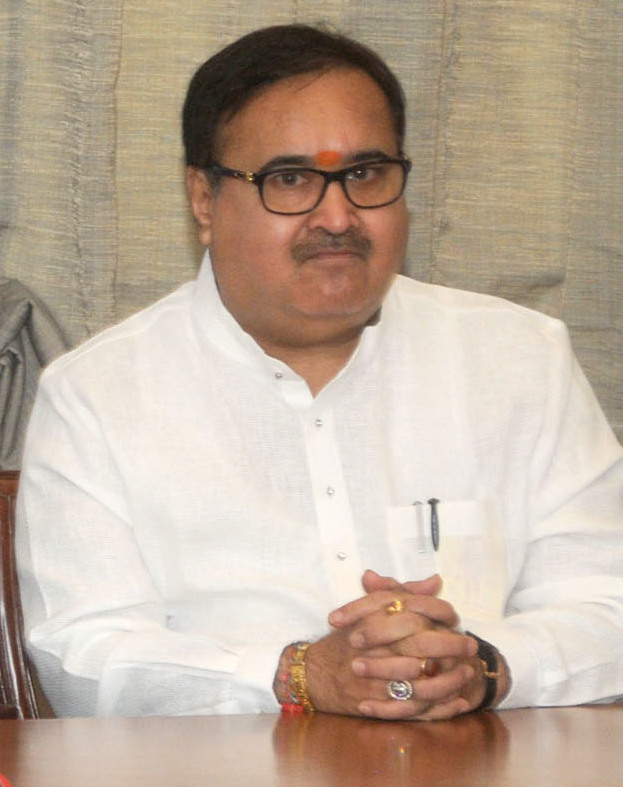

Minister of Housing Government of Maharashtra
- In office 5 December 2014 – 16 June 2019
- Chief Minister: Devendra Fadnavis
- Succeeded by: Radhakrishna Vikhe Patil

Minister of Industries & Mining Government of Maharashtra
- In office 31 October 2014 – 5 December 2014
- Chief Minister: Devendra Fadnavis
- Succeeded by: Subhash Desai

Minister of Parliamentary Affairs Government of Maharashtra
- In office 31 October 2014 – 5 December 2014
- Chief Minister: Devendra Fadnavis
- Succeeded by: Girish Bapat

Member of Maharashtra Legislative Assembly
- In office 2009–2019
- Succeeded by: Parag Shah
- Constituency: Ghatkopar East
- In office 1990–2009
- Constituency: Ghatkopar

Personal details
- Born: 22 April 1959 (age 66) Bombay, Bombay State, India
- Party: Bharatiya Janata Party
- Spouse: Kishori Mehta
- Children: Abhishek (Elder Son); Harsh Mehta (Younger Son)
- Occupation: Politician
- Website: official website

Prakash Mehta (born 22 April 1959) is an Indian politician from Maharashtra and a senior leader of the Bharatiya Janata Party (BJP). He was the President for Mumbai BJP Unit.

Prakash Mehta was the State Cabinet Minister for Housing Department. He served six consecutive terms (1990–2019) as the Member of the Legislative Assembly of Maharashtra.

== Early life and education ==
Prakash Mehta belongs to Gujarati middle-class family and is originally from Una town in Saurashtra region of Gujarat. He is married to Kishori Mehta and has two sons, Abhishek Mehta & Harsh Mehta. Prakash Mehta is the face of Gujarati community and is the most popular Gujarati leader in Maharashtra. Prakash Mehta was drawn to politics in his early teens and was a member of Rashtriya Swayamsevak Sangh (RSS). During 1975–77, as a youth, he actively participated and volunteered during the Emergency and Total Revolution launched by Jayprakash Narayan.

== Political career ==
He was the President for Mumbai BJP Unit in 2013. Prakash Mehta served as the State Cabinet Minister for Housing Department. He was a member of Maharashtra Legislative Assembly for six consecutive terms from 1990 to 2019.

Mahul residents have been protesting since 23 October 2018 to demand solutions and action from Mehta to relocate them, which has been declared 'not fit for human habitation' by the National Green Tribunal act in 2015.

He was succeeded by Parag Shah in Ghatkopar East constituency in 2019.

== See also ==
- Manohar Joshi ministry (1995–99)
- Devendra Fadnavis first ministry

Political offices
Preceded by	Cabinet Minister for Housing, Mining and Labour, Maharashtra State; 31 October 2014–present	Incumbent
Preceded by	Maharashtra State Guardian Minister for Raigad district December 2014–present	Incumbent
