= Shanti Patel =

Indian politician

Shanti G Patel

Mayor of Mumbai
- In office 1970-1971

Member of Parliament, Rajya Sabha
- In office 1980-1986

Personal details
- Born: 1922
- Died: June 13, 2014 (aged 91–92) Mahim, Mumbai, India
- Party: Indian National Congress
- Other political affiliations: Janata Dal

Shanti G. Patel (1922 – 2014) was an Indian politician and freedom fighter from Bombay, India, who served as Mayor of Mumbai and Member of Rajya Sabha (upper house of Indian parliament).

At the age of 93, he died on June 13, 2014, at his home in Mahim.

== See also ==
- Mayor of Mumbai
- List of Rajya Sabha members from Maharashtra
