= Mulund Assembly constituency =

Constituency of the Maharashtra legislative assembly in India

Coordinates: 19.176°N 72.949°E

Mulund
- Constituency No. 155 for the Maharashtra Legislative Assembly

Constituency details
- Country: India
- Region: Western India
- State: Maharashtra
- District: Mumbai Suburban
- Lok Sabha constituency: Mumbai North East
- Established: 1967
- Total electors: 296,732
- Reservation: None

Member of Legislative Assembly
- 15th Maharashtra Legislative Assembly
- Incumbent Mihir Kotecha
- Party: Bharatiya Janata Party
- Elected year: 2024

Mulund Assembly constituency is one of the 288 Vidhan Sabha (Legislative Assembly) constituencies of Maharashtra state in western India.

== Overview ==
Mulund constituency is one of the 26 Vidhan Sabha constituencies located in the Mumbai Suburban district.

Mulund is part of the Mumbai North East Lok Sabha constituency along with five other Vidhan Sabha segments, namely Vikhroli, Ghatkopar West, Ghatkopar East, Mankhurd Shivaji Nagar and Bhandup West in the Mumbai Suburban district.

== Members of the Legislative Assembly ==
Year	Member	Party
1967	P. V. Upadhyay	Indian National Congress
1972	Dutta Samant	Indian National Congress
1978	Prabhakar Patwardhan	Janata Party
1980	G. S. Trivedi	Indian National Congress
1985	Dinanath Bama Patil	Indian National Congress
1990	Vamanrao Parab	Bharatiya Janata Party
1995	Kirit Somaiya	Bharatiya Janata Party
1999	Sardar Tara Singh	Bharatiya Janata Party
2004	Sardar Tara Singh	Bharatiya Janata Party
2009	Sardar Tara Singh	Bharatiya Janata Party
2014	Sardar Tara Singh	Bharatiya Janata Party
2019	Mihir Kotecha	Bharatiya Janata Party
2024	Mihir Kotecha	Bharatiya Janata Party

== Election results ==
=== Assembly Election 2024 ===
2024 Maharashtra Legislative Assembly election : Mulund
Party	Candidate	Votes	%	±%
BJP	Mihir Chandrakant Kotecha	131,549	73.31%	▲14.88
INC	Rakesh Shankar Shetty	41,517	23.14%	▲7.16
NOTA	None of the Above	3,834	2.14%	▼1.35
VBA	Pradeep Mahadev Shirsat	3,216	1.79%	▼1.39
BSP	Adv. Siddhesh Nanda K. Avhad	1,196	0.67%	▲0.03
Margin of victory		90,032	50.17%	▲11.77
Turnout		183,272	61.76%	▲8.47
Total valid votes		179,438		
Registered electors		296,732		▲3.33
BJP hold		Swing	▲14.88	

=== Assembly Election 2019 ===
2019 Maharashtra Legislative Assembly election : Mulund
Party	Candidate	Votes	%	±%
BJP	Mihir Chandrakant Kotecha	87,253	58.43%	▲3.07
MNS	Harshala Rajesh Chavan	29,905	20.03%	▲12.10
INC	Govind Singh	23,854	15.97%	▼0.86
NOTA	None of the Above	5,200	3.48%	▲2.45
VBA	Shashikant Rohidas Mokal	4,756	3.18%	New
BSP	Shreerang Anna Kamble	951	0.64%	▼0.39
Margin of victory		57,348	38.40%	▼0.12
Turnout		154,615	53.84%	▼4.85
Total valid votes		149,337		
Registered electors		287,173		▼3.71
BJP hold		Swing	▲3.07	

=== Assembly Election 2014 ===
2014 Maharashtra Legislative Assembly election : Mulund
Party	Candidate	Votes	%	±%
BJP	Sardar Tara Singh	93,850	55.35%	▲11.35
INC	Charan Singh Sapra	28,543	16.84%	▼6.34
SS	Prabhakar Shinde	26,259	15.49%	New
MNS	Satyawan Dalvi	13,432	7.92%	▼17.36
NCP	Nandkumar Atmaram Vaity	4,880	2.88%	New
NOTA	None of the Above	1,748	1.03%	New
BSP	Patil Nilesh Vasantrao	1,742	1.03%	▲0.49
Margin of victory		65,307	38.52%	▲19.80
Turnout		171,355	57.46%	▲7.29
Total valid votes		169,544		
Registered electors		298,242		▼1.09
BJP hold		Swing	▲11.35	

=== Assembly Election 2009 ===
2009 Maharashtra Legislative Assembly election : Mulund
Party	Candidate	Votes	%	±%
BJP	Sardar Tara Singh	65,748	44.00%	▼9.33
MNS	Dalvi Satyawan Ganpat	37,772	25.28%	New
INC	Adv. Mahadeo Shelar	34,630	23.18%	▼17.97
RPI(A)	Yogesh (Alias) Siddharth Sahebrao Shilwant	3,706	2.48%	New
Independent	Pankajbhai Somchand Shah	1,767	1.18%	New
Independent	Bhavesh Bhinde	1,441	0.96%	New
Margin of victory		27,976	18.72%	▲6.54
Turnout		149,429	49.56%	▲1.38
Total valid votes		149,426		
Registered electors		301,518		▼14.76
BJP hold		Swing	▼9.33	

=== Assembly Election 2004 ===
2004 Maharashtra Legislative Assembly election : Mulund
Party	Candidate	Votes	%	±%
BJP	Sardar Tara Singh	90,882	53.33%	▲1.34
INC	Alka Anant Desai	70,124	41.15%	▲9.96
SP	Chetan Bhagwanbhai Kothari	2,778	1.63%	New
BSP	Subhash Jaiswar	2,342	1.37%	▲0.63
Independent	Suryakant Visharam Palav	1,078	0.63%	New
Margin of victory		20,758	12.18%	▼8.62
Turnout		170,425	48.18%	▲0.25
Total valid votes		170,423		
Registered electors		353,744		▲8.87
BJP hold		Swing	▲1.34	

=== Assembly Election 1999 ===
1999 Maharashtra Legislative Assembly election : Mulund
Party	Candidate	Votes	%	±%
BJP	Sardar Tara Singh	80,972	51.99%	▼4.82
INC	Charan Singh Sapra	48,577	31.19%	▼2.96
NCP	Mirekar Parshuram Gangaram	19,860	12.75%	New
JD(U)	Anil Vasant Gangurde	2,509	1.61%	New
BSP	Khaie Arun Pandharinath	1,160	0.74%	▼1.90
Margin of victory		32,395	20.80%	▼1.86
Turnout		155,785	47.94%	▼13.44
Total valid votes		155,739		
Registered electors		324,925		▲3.80
BJP hold		Swing	▼4.82	

=== Assembly Election 1995 ===
1995 Maharashtra Legislative Assembly election : Mulund
Party	Candidate	Votes	%	±%
BJP	Kirit Somaiya	109,143	56.81%	▲5.91
INC	R. R. Singh	65,616	34.16%	▼4.36
BSP	Bubas Shiv Jaiswar	5,083	2.65%	New
JD	Dr. Babulal Ramkripal Singh	3,546	1.85%	▼5.20
Independent	Kaveeraj Nana Sabale	2,361	1.23%	New
Margin of victory		43,527	22.66%	▲10.27
Turnout		195,099	62.33%	▲4.92
Total valid votes		192,107		
Registered electors		313,022		▲22.48
BJP hold		Swing	▲5.91	

=== Assembly Election 1990 ===
1990 Maharashtra Legislative Assembly election : Mulund
Party	Candidate	Votes	%	±%
BJP	Vamanrao Ganpatrao Parab	73,438	50.90%	▲14.91
INC	R. R. Singh	55,566	38.51%	▼14.98
JD	Govind Kashninath Mhatre	10,162	7.04%	New
Independent	Jagjivan Mulji Tanna	2,599	1.80%	New
INS(SCS)	Ramesh Narbheram Joshi	1,366	0.95%	New
Margin of victory		17,872	12.39%	▼5.12
Turnout		145,588	56.96%	▲6.67
Total valid votes		144,276		
Registered electors		255,576		▲28.36
BJP gain from INC		Swing	▼2.59	

=== Assembly Election 1985 ===
1985 Maharashtra Legislative Assembly election : Mulund
Party	Candidate	Votes	%	±%
INC	Patil Dinanath Bama	53,031	53.50%	New
BJP	Vamanrao Ganpatrao Parab	35,676	35.99%	▼5.10
Independent	Jagannath Sadashiv Mali	6,371	6.43%	New
LKD	Abraham V. M.	2,175	2.19%	New
Independent	Laxman Ranu Sawant	870	0.88%	New
Margin of victory		17,355	17.51%	▲15.30
Turnout		100,284	50.37%	▲10.86
Total valid votes		99,131		
Registered electors		199,113		▲21.96
INC gain from INC(I)		Swing	▲10.20	

=== Assembly Election 1980 ===
1980 Maharashtra Legislative Assembly election : Mulund
Party	Candidate	Votes	%	±%
INC(I)	G. S. Trivedi	27,515	43.30%	▲25.15
BJP	Vamanrao Ganpatrao Parab	26,110	41.09%	New
JP	K. P. Shah	4,466	7.03%	▼51.91
INC(U)	R. K. Dube	3,090	4.86%	New
[[Janata Party (Secular) Charan Singh|Janata Party (Secular) Charan Singh]]	Sharam Chittaranjan	1,747	2.75%	New
Margin of victory		1,405	2.21%	▼38.58
Turnout		64,195	39.32%	▼25.40
Total valid votes		63,547		
Registered electors		163,259		▲10.41
INC(I) gain from JP		Swing	▼15.64	

=== Assembly Election 1978 ===
1978 Maharashtra Legislative Assembly election : Mulund
Party	Candidate	Votes	%	±%
JP	Patwardhan Prabhakar Ramchandar	56,061	58.94%	New
INC(I)	Trivedi Gaurishankar Satyanarayan	17,265	18.15%	New
INC	Sinh Ramcharitra Rambhajan	11,669	12.27%	▼45.01
SS	Patil Baburao Harishchandra	9,941	10.45%	▼4.06
Margin of victory		38,796	40.79%	▼1.99
Turnout		96,727	65.42%	▲2.64
Total valid votes		95,118		
Registered electors		147,865		▼28.63
JP gain from INC		Swing	▲1.66	

=== Assembly Election 1972 ===
1972 Maharashtra Legislative Assembly election : Mulund
Party	Candidate	Votes	%	±%
INC	Dattatray Narayan Samant	73,206	57.28%	▲17.96
SS	Ramchandra Vishnu Padwal	18,542	14.51%	New
ABJS	Dharkar Vinayak Ganesh	17,634	13.80%	▼6.92
Independent	Vadilal Chatarbhuj Gandhi	5,840	4.57%	New
RPI(K)	S. Balakrishnan	4,981	3.90%	New
CPI(M)	Sanzgiri P. Pandurang	4,888	3.82%	▼21.42
Independent	Bande Laxman Dagdu	1,656	1.30%	New
Margin of victory		54,664	42.77%	▲28.69
Turnout		130,832	63.15%	▼2.74
Total valid votes		127,801		
Registered electors		207,179		▲61.87
INC hold		Swing	▲17.96	

=== Assembly Election 1967 ===
1967 Maharashtra Legislative Assembly election : Mulund
Party	Candidate	Votes	%	±%
INC	P. V. Upadhyay	32,427	39.32%	New
CPI(M)	P. P. Sanzgiri	20,816	25.24%	New
ABJS	W. G. Parab	17,085	20.72%	New
Independent	B. S. Bavasakar	5,183	6.29%	New
SWA	V. M. Astik	4,469	5.42%	New
Independent	S. J. Vavle	1,825	2.21%	New
Margin of victory		11,611	14.08%	
Turnout		87,382	68.27%	
Total valid votes		82,459		
Registered electors		127,989		
INC win (new seat)				

== See also ==
- Mulund
- List of constituencies of Maharashtra Vidhan Sabha
