= Ghatkopar West Assembly constituency =

Constituency of the Maharashtra legislative assembly in India

Ghatkopar West
- Constituency No. 169 for the Maharashtra Legislative Assembly

Constituency details
- Country: India
- Region: Western India
- State: Maharashtra
- District: Mumbai Suburban
- Lok Sabha constituency: Mumbai North East
- Established: 2008
- Total electors: 277,595
- Reservation: None

Member of Legislative Assembly
- 15th Maharashtra Legislative Assembly
- Incumbent Ram Kadam
- Party: Bharatiya Janata Party
- Elected year: 2024

Ghatkopar West Assembly constituency is one of the 288 Vidhan Sabha (Legislative Assembly) constituencies of Maharashtra state in western India.

== Overview ==
Ghatkopar West (constituency number 169) is one of the 26 Vidhan Sabha constituencies located in the Mumbai Suburban district. The number of electorates in 2009 was 305,516 (male 175,681, female 129,835).

Ghatkopar West is part of the Mumbai North East Lok Sabha constituency along with five other Vidhan Sabha segments, namely Mulund, Vikhroli, Ghatkopar East, Mankhurd Shivaji Nagar and Bhandup West in the Mumbai Suburban district.

== Members of the Legislative Assembly ==
Year	Member	Party
Till 2009 : Constituency did not exist
2009	Ram Kadam	Maharashtra Navnirman Sena
2014	Ram Kadam	Bharatiya Janata Party
2019	Ram Kadam	Bharatiya Janata Party
2024	Ram Kadam	Bharatiya Janata Party

== Election results ==
=== Assembly Election 2024 ===
2024 Maharashtra Legislative Assembly election : Ghatkopar West
Party	Candidate	Votes	%	±%
BJP	Ram Kadam	73,171	44.11%	▼3.64
SS(UBT)	Sanjay Dattatray Bhalerao	60,200	36.29%	New
MNS	Ganesh Arjun Chukkal	25,862	15.59%	▲5.38
VBA	Sagar Ramesh Gawai	4,649	2.80%	▼2.69
NOTA	None of the Above	1,387	0.84%	▼0.72
Margin of victory		12,971	7.82%	▼11.74
Turnout		167,283	60.26%	▲5.18
Total valid votes		165,896		
Registered electors		277,595		▲2.30
BJP hold		Swing	▼3.64	

=== Assembly Election 2019 ===
2019 Maharashtra Legislative Assembly election : Ghatkopar West
Party	Candidate	Votes	%	±%
BJP	Ram Kadam	70,263	47.75%	▼3.14
Independent	Sanjay Dattatray Bhalerao	41,474	28.18%	New
MNS	Ganesh Arjun Chukkal	15,019	10.21%	▼0.69
INC	Anand Rajyavardhan Shukla	9,313	6.33%	▼0.05
VBA	Ganesh Ravsaheb Owhal	8,088	5.50%	New
NOTA	None of the Above	2,297	1.56%	▲0.37
Margin of victory		28,789	19.56%	▼6.99
Turnout		149,467	55.08%	▲3.01
Total valid votes		147,156		
Registered electors		271,345		▼10.50
BJP hold		Swing	▼3.14	

=== Assembly Election 2014 ===
2014 Maharashtra Legislative Assembly election : Ghatkopar West
Party	Candidate	Votes	%	±%
BJP	Ram Kadam	80,343	50.89%	▲27.02
SS	Sudhir Sayaji More	38,427	24.34%	New
MNS	Dilip Bhausaheb Lande	17,207	10.90%	▼31.31
INC	Ramgovind Yadav	10,071	6.38%	▼14.86
NCP	Harun Yusuf Khan	7,426	4.70%	New
NOTA	None of the Above	1,879	1.19%	New
BBM	Shaheen Mohammed Shafi Shaikh	1,539	0.97%	New
BSP	Gautam Laxman Gaikwad	1,430	0.91%	▼0.07
Margin of victory		41,916	26.55%	▲8.20
Turnout		159,782	52.70%	▲5.29
Total valid votes		157,876		
Registered electors		303,172		▼0.77
BJP gain from MNS		Swing	▲8.68	

=== Assembly Election 2009 ===
2009 Maharashtra Legislative Assembly election : Ghatkopar West
Party	Candidate	Votes	%	±%
MNS	Ram Kadam	60,343	42.21%	New
BJP	Poonam Mahajan Rao	34,115	23.86%	New
INC	Janet D'Souza	30,360	21.24%	New
Independent	Mukund Thorat	8,096	5.66%	New
Lok Bharati	Sharad Shantaram Kadam	2,030	1.42%	New
BSP	Mahendra Sopan Kamble	1,398	0.98%	New
RJD	Ayub Aminmistry Hungund	894	0.63%	New
Margin of victory		26,228	18.35%	
Turnout		142,951	46.79%	
Total valid votes		142,950		
Registered electors		305,535		
MNS win (new seat)				

== See also ==
- Ghatkopar
- List of constituencies of Maharashtra Vidhan Sabha
