= Manoj Kotak =

Indian politician

Member of Parliament, Lok Sabha
- In office 23 May 2019 – 03 June 2024
- Preceded by: Kirit Somaiya
- Succeeded by: Sanjay Dina Patil
- Constituency: Mumbai North East

Councillor of Mumbai Municipal Corporation
- In office 2007-2019
- Constituency: 103, T Ward

Personal details
- Born: 25 December 1972 (age 53) Rajkot, Gujarat, India
- Party: Bharatiya Janata Party
- Spouse: Seema Manoj Kotak

Manoj Kishorbhai Kotak is an Indian politician. He is a member of the Bharatiya Janata Party. He has served Lok Sabha, Parliament of India from Mumbai North East since 2019. He served 3-terms as a Corporator in the Brihanmumbai Municipal Corporation and was leader of the Bharatiya Janata Party in the Corporation.

Kotak, BJP candidate, won in 2019 Indian general elections against National Congress party (NCP) candidate Sanjay Dina Patil in North East constituency of Mumbai by a margin of 2.26 lakh votes.

== Positions held ==
- Member of Parliament, Mumbai North-East Parliamentary Constituency.2019
- Member, Parliamentary Standing Committee on Finance.
- Member, Parliamentary Standing Committee on Commerce.
- Member, Consultative Committee for Ministry of Shipping, Government of India.
- Municipal Corporator, MCGM (2007 - till date)
- Improvements Committee Chairman, MCGM.(2009–10)
- Education Committee Chairman, MCGM.(2013–14)
- BJP Group Leader, MCGM.(2019 onwards)
- Member, Standing Committee, MCGM.
- Member, Mumbai Metropolitan Region Development Authority.
