= Tara Govind Sapre =

Indian politician

Tara Govind Sapre (1919–1981) was an Indian National Congress politician who represented Bombay North East in the 4th Lok Sabha.

== Early life ==
Daughter to R. B. Govind Raghunath Barve, Tara was born on 9 May 1919 in Poona, Bombay Presidency and attended the Fergusson College, from where she received her Bachelor of Arts degree.

== Career ==
Sapre was a member of the All India Women's Conference. She also campaigned for her brother S. G. Barve, a politician of the Indian National Congress and Member of Parliament from Bombay North East. His sudden death in 1967 necessitated a bye-election and the Bombay Pradesh Congress Committee fielded Sapre in the constituency while V. K. Krishna Menon, who finished second in the previous election stood as an Independent. Since he was from Kerala, the Shiv Sena opposed him vehemently for being an "outsider". Sapre won the seat, polling 156,313 votes against his 141,257 and became a member of the 4th Lok Sabha.

== Personal life ==
She married Govind Vithal Sapre on 25 May 1940. Together they had two sons and one daughter. She died on 14 January 1981, due a heart attack in Pune.
