= Tara Singh (Mumbai politician) =

Indian politician (1938–2020)

Member of the Maharashtra Legislative Assembly for Mulund
- In office 1999–2019

Personal details
- Born: Sardar Tara Singh; 1938 Mumbai, India
- Died: 19 September 2020 (aged 82) Mumbai, India
- Party: Bharatiya Janata Party
- Website: www.sardartarasingh.com Official Facebook

Sardar Tara Singh (1938 – 19 September 2020) was an Indian politician, the leader of Bharatiya Janata Party, and a member of the Maharashtra Legislative Assembly elected from the Mulund assembly constituency in Mumbai.

On 21 February 2017, 300 party workers from different political parties attending the Brihanmumbai Municipal Corporation elections protested the presence of Singh at a polling booth in Gavanpada by attacking his car.
