= Gurudas Kamat =

Indian politician (1954–2018)

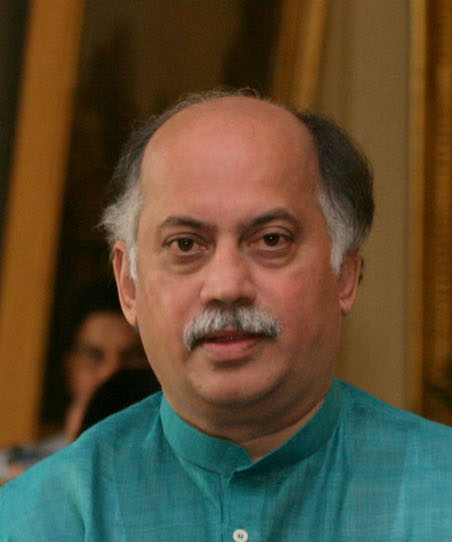
- Gurudas Kamat in November 2010

Union Minister of State (Independent Charge) for Drinking Water and Sanitation
- In office 12 July 2011 – 13 July 2011
- Prime Minister: Manmohan Singh
- Preceded by: Ministry created
- Succeeded by: Jairam Ramesh

Union Minister of State for Home Affairs
- In office 19 January 2009 – 12 July 2011
- Prime Minister: Manmohan Singh
- Minister: P. Chidambaram
- Preceded by: Ajay Maken
- Succeeded by: Jitendra Singh

Union Minister of State for Communications and Information Technology
- In office 28 May 2009 – 19 January 2011; 12 July 2011–12 July 2011 Serving with Sachin Pilot
- Prime Minister: Manmohan Singh
- Minister: A. Raja; Kapil Sibal
- Preceded by: Jyotiraditya Scindia
- Succeeded by: Milind Deora
Parliamentary offices
Member of Parliament, Lok Sabha
In office 16 May 2009 – 16 May 2014
Preceded by	Priya Dutt
Succeeded by	Gajanan Kirtikar
Constituency	Mumbai North West
In office 16 May 2004 – 16 May 2009
Preceded by	Kirit Somaiya
Succeeded by	Sanjay Dina Patil
Constituency	Mumbai North East
In office 1998–1999
Preceded by	Pramod Mahajan
Succeeded by	Kirit Somaiya
In office 1991–1996
Preceded by	Jayawantiben Mehta
Succeeded by	Pramod Mahajan
In office 1984–1989
Preceded by	Subramanian Swamy
Succeeded by	Jayawantiben Mehta

Personal details
- Born: 5 October 1954 Ankola, Bombay State, India
- Died: 22 August 2018 (aged 63) New Delhi, Delhi, India
- Party: Indian National Congress
- Spouse: Maharookh Gurudas Kamat
- Children: Dr. Sunil Kamat

Gurudas Kamat (5 October 1954 – 22 August 2018) was an Indian politician from the Indian National Congress (INC).

An advocate by profession, Kamat was a commerce graduate from R.A. Podar College, Mumbai and has a law degree from the Government Law College, Mumbai.

He was a Member of the Parliament for the Mumbai North West constituency of Maharashtra in 2009 and Mumbai North East constituency of Maharashtra in 1984, 1991, 1998 and 2004. He served as the Minister of State for Home Affairs with additional charge of Minister of Communications and Information Technology, Government of India during 2009 to 2011. In July 2011, he resigned as minister. In July 2013, Kamat was appointed General Secretary All India Congress Committee and given charge of Rajasthan, Gujarat, Dadra and Nagar Haveli, Daman and Diu and was also appointed a member of the Congress Working Committee, the highest decision-making body of the Indian National Congress. In 2014, he lost the Lok Sabha Election. In 2017, Kamat resigned from all positions that he held at the Indian National Congress. Despite his insistence on resignation the Party continued to acknowledge him as the General Secretary of AICC.

== Early life, education and political career ==
Kamat started his political career as a student leader in 1972. In 1976, he was appointed the President of National Students' Union of India, Mumbai Unit. In 1980 he was appointed General Secretary of Maharashtra Pradesh Youth Congress; in 1984, he was appointed the President of the Maharashtra Pradesh Youth Congress; and in 1987, he was appointed the President of the Indian Youth Congress. Kamat was appointed the President of Mumbai Congress in 2003. He held the position till 2008.

In 1982, Kamat represented the Indian Youth Congress at International Convention in Bucharest, Romania. In 1986, Kamat represented International Youth Festival in Moscow and USSR. In 2003, he was a member of the four member delegation representing India at the United Nations in New York City along with Atal Bihari Vajpayee, Inder Kumar Gujral and Farooq Abdullah. Kamat represented the Prime Minister of India, Manmohan Singh, at the UN Convention at Addis Ababa, Ethiopia.

In 1976, Kamat was awarded the Principal Wellingkar Trophy for the Most Outstanding Student Award at the R.A. Podar College and in 1979 was named a Fellow of Government Law College in Mumbai.

In 1981, Kamat married Maharookh Kamat with whom he has one son, Sunil, who is a doctor, an intensivist and a Fellow at Sloan Kettering Memorial, New York City.

== Death ==
Gurudas Kamat died at a private hospital in New Delhi on 22 August 2018 following a heart attack.

Lok Sabha
Preceded by Subramanian Swamy	Member of Parliament for Mumbai North East; 1984–1989	Succeeded by Jayawantiben Mehta
Preceded by Jayawantiben Mehta	Member of Parliament for Mumbai North East; 1991–1996	Succeeded by Pramod Mahajan
Preceded by Pramod Mahajan	Member of Parliament for Mumbai North East; 1998–1999	Succeeded by Kirit Somaiya
Preceded by Kirit Somaiya	Member of Parliament for Mumbai North East; 2004–2009	Succeeded by Sanjay Dina Patil
Preceded by Priya Dutt	Member of Parliament for Mumbai North West; 2009–2014	Succeeded by Gajanan Kirtikar
