= Parag Shah =

Indian real estate developer (man infrastructure) and politician

Member of the Maharashtra Legislative Assembly
- Incumbent
- Assumed office 24 October 2019
- Preceded by: Prakash Mehta
- Constituency: Ghatkopar East

Personal details
- Born: 16 August 1969 (age 57) Mumbai, Maharashtra
- Party: Bharatiya Janata Party
- Website: paragkshah.com

Parag Shah is an Indian real estate developer and politician belonging to the Bharatiya Janata Party. In 2019, he was elected as Member of Maharashtra Legislative Assembly representing Ghatkopar East constituency.

== Political career ==
In 2017, Shah contested Brihanmumbai Mahanagar Palika (BMC) election from ward 132 and won from there later. He declared movable assets worth ₹670 crore (US$70 million) and immovable assets worth ₹20 crore (US$2.1 million) on his and his wife's name. He was the richest contesting candidate in the election.

Shah contested in 2019 Maharashtra Legislative Assembly election from Ghatkopar East constituency. At this time, he declared his property worth ₹500.62 crore (US$52 million) and he was richest candidate in the election. He won the election with margin of 53319 votes.
