= Sunil Raut =

Indian politician

Member of Maharashtra Legislative Assembly
- Incumbent
- Assumed office 2014
- Preceded by: Mangesh Sangle
- Constituency: Vikhroli

Personal details
- Born: 20 July Alibag, Maharashtra, India
- Party: Shiv Sena (UBT) (from 2022)
- Other political affiliations: Shiv Sena (till 2022)
- Relations: Sanjay Raut (brother)
- Occupation: Politician

Sunil Raut is a Shiv Sena (UBT) politician from Mumbai. He is Member of Maharashtra Legislative Assembly representing Vikhroli Assembly Constituency as member of Shiv Sena. He is the younger brother of Shiv Sena Leader and Rajya Sabha MP Sanjay Raut.

== Positions held ==
- 2014: Elected to Maharashtra Legislative Assembly
- 2019: Re-elected to Maharashtra Legislative Assembly
- 2015: Elected as director of Mumbai District Central Cooperative Bank
- 2021: Re-elected as director of Mumbai District Central Cooperative Bank
