= Shishir Shinde =

Indian politician

Member of Legislative Assembly of Maharashtra
- In office 2009–2014
- Succeeded by: Ashok Patil
- Constituency: Bhandup West

Member of Maharashtra Legislative Council
- In office 25 April 1996 – 24 April 2002
- Constituency: Elected by MLA's

Personal details
- Born: 24 February 1954 (age 72) Dharwad, Bombay State, India
- Party: Shiv Sena
- Other political affiliations: Maharashtra Navnirman Sena
- Spouse: Anita Shinde
- Children: Vaibhav Shinde, Alok Shinde

Shishir Shinde (born 24 February 1954) is a Shiv Sena politician from the Maharashtra, India. He was member of the Maharashtra Legislative Assembly representing Bhandup West constituency.

In October 1991, in order to stop a scheduled India-Pakistan test cricket match, Shinde, along with a few party workers of Shiv Sena, vandalized the pitch of Wankhede Stadium. By digging and pouring engine oil, the pitch was rendered useless for play and led to the cancellation of the series.

== Positions held ==
- 1992: Elected as corporator in the Brihanmumbai Municipal Corporation
- 1996: Elected as member of the Maharashtra Legislative Council
- 2009: Elected to Maharashtra Legislative Assembly
- 2009: He was Leader of Maharashtra Navnirman Sena
