= Vikramgad Assembly constituency =

Constituency of the Maharashtra legislative assembly in India

Coordinates: 19.80°N 73.10°E

Vikramgad
- Constituency No. 129 for the Maharashtra Legislative Assembly

Constituency details
- Country: India
- Region: Western India
- State: Maharashtra
- Lok Sabha constituency: Palghar
- Established: 2008
- Total electors: 317,862
- Reservation: ST

Member of Legislative Assembly
- 15th Maharashtra Legislative Assembly
- Incumbent Bhoye Harishchandra Sakharam
- Party: BJP
- Elected year: 2024

Vikramgad Assembly constituency is one of the 288 Vidhan Sabha (Legislative Assembly) constituencies of Maharashtra state in western India.

== Overview ==
Vikramgad constituency is one of the 6 Vidhan Sabha constituencies located in Palghar district. It is reserved for candidates belonging to the Scheduled Tribes. The constituency comprises the entire Vikramgad, Jawhar, and Mokhada tehsils, as well as part of the Wada tehsil in the district.

Vikramgad is a part of Palghar Lok Sabha constituency, along with five other Vidhan Sabha constituencies, namely, Dahanu, Palghar, Boisar, Nalasopara, and Vasai in Thane district.

== Members of the Legislative Assembly ==
Year	Member	Party
Until 2008: Constituency did not exist
2009	Chintaman Vanaga	Bharatiya Janata Party
2014	Vishnu Savara	Bharatiya Janata Party
2019	Sunil Bhusara	Nationalist Congress Party
2024	Harishchandra Bhoye	Bharatiya Janata Party

== Election results ==
=== Assembly Election 2024 ===
2024 Maharashtra Legislative Assembly election : Vikramgad
Party	Candidate	Votes	%	±%
BJP	Bhoye Harishchandra Sakharam	114,514	46.89%	▲8.44
NCP-SP	Sunil Chandrakant Bhuasara	73,106	29.93%	New
Independent	Nikam Prakash Krushna	32,568	13.34%	New
Independent	Akash Chandrakant Shinde	6,561	2.69%	New
Independent	Bhalchandra Navasu Morgha	5,060	2.07%	New
MNS	Sachin Damodar Shingada	4,619	1.89%	New
NOTA	None of the Above	4,585	1.88%	▼3.00
Bhartiya Tribal Party	Mohan Baraku Guhe	2,495	1.02%	New
Margin of victory		41,408	16.95%	▲4.68
Turnout		248,812	78.28%	▲9.67
Total valid votes		244,227		
Registered electors		317,862		▲19.24
BJP gain from NCP		Swing	▼3.83	

=== Assembly Election 2019 ===
2019 Maharashtra Legislative Assembly election : Vikramgad
Party	Candidate	Votes	%	±%
NCP	Sunil Chandrakant Bhuasara	88,425	50.72%	▲30.85
BJP	Dr. Hemant Vishnu Savara	67,026	38.44%	▲13.53
NOTA	None of the Above	8,495	4.87%	▲2.28
RMPI	Kama Dharma Tabale	4,032	2.31%	New
CPI	Bhoir Suresh Bhau	3,882	2.23%	New
Independent	Bhalchandra Navsu Morgha	2,771	1.59%	New
Marxist Leninist Party of India (Red Flag)	Com. Sakharam Bhoi	2,043	1.17%	New
VBA	Santosh Ramdas Wagh	1,751	1.00%	New
Margin of victory		21,399	12.27%	▲9.89
Turnout		182,889	68.61%	▲3.14
Total valid votes		174,346		
Registered electors		266,576		▲8.17
NCP gain from BJP		Swing	▲25.80	

=== Assembly Election 2014 ===
2014 Maharashtra Legislative Assembly election : Vikramgad
Party	Candidate	Votes	%	±%
BJP	Vishnu Savara	40,201	24.92%	▼7.17
SS	Prakash Krushna Nikam	36,356	22.53%	New
NCP	Sunil Chandrakant Bhuasara	32,053	19.87%	▼8.81
BVA	Govind Hemant Ramchandra	18,085	11.21%	New
CPI(M)	Budhar Ratan Ravji	13,152	8.15%	▼2.10
INC	Ashok Kashinath Patil	5,324	3.30%	New
MNS	Bharat Pandurag Hajare	4,743	2.94%	▼4.42
NOTA	None of the Above	4,188	2.60%	New
Margin of victory		3,845	2.38%	▼1.03
Turnout		165,544	67.18%	▲4.17
Total valid votes		161,336		
Registered electors		246,431		▲2.32
BJP hold		Swing	▼7.17	

=== Assembly Election 2009 ===
2009 Maharashtra Legislative Assembly election : Vikramgad
Party	Candidate	Votes	%	±%
BJP	Chintaman Vanaga	47,371	32.09%	New
NCP	Chandrakant Ravji Bhusara	42,339	28.68%	New
CPI(M)	Budhar Ratan Ravaji	15,141	10.26%	New
MNS	Dr. Bhoye Parakash Sadashiv	10,867	7.36%	New
Independent	Vashali Satish Jadhav	7,660	5.19%	New
Independent	Kokera Kashinath Laxman	7,218	4.89%	New
Independent	Gunanth Ganpat Bhoier	5,322	3.60%	New
Margin of victory		5,032	3.41%	
Turnout		147,664	61.31%	
Total valid votes		147,640		
Registered electors		240,834		
BJP win (new seat)				

== See also ==
- Wada Assembly constituency
- List of constituencies of Maharashtra Vidhan Sabha
