= Vasai Assembly constituency =

Constituency of the Maharashtra legislative assembly in India

Coordinates: 19.39°N 72.83°E

Vasai
- Constituency No. 133 for the Maharashtra Legislative Assembly

Constituency details
- Country: India
- Region: Western India
- State: Maharashtra
- District: Palghar
- Lok Sabha constituency: Palghar
- Established: 1978
- Total electors: 354,683
- Reservation: None

Member of Legislative Assembly
- 15th Maharashtra Legislative Assembly
- Incumbent Sneha Pandit
- Party: Bharatiya Janata Party
- Elected year: 2024

Vasai Assembly constituency is one of the 288 Vidhan Sabha (Legislative Assembly) constituencies of Maharashtra state in western India. It is one of the six Vidhan Sabha constituencies located in Palghar district.

Vasai is part of Palghar Lok Sabha constituency along with five other Vidhan Sabha constituencies in Palghar district, namely Dahanu, Vikramgad, Palghar, Boisar and Nalasopara.

Before the delimitation, Vasai Assembly constituency was part of the Mumbai North Lok Sabha constituency.

== Members of the Legislative Assembly ==
Year	Member	Party
From 1952 - 1972 see: Bassein
1978	Pandharinath Choudhari	Janata Party
1980	Tarabai Vartak	Indian National Congress (I)
1985	Dominic Gonsalves	Janata Party
1990	Hitendra Thakur	Indian National Congress
1995	Hitendra Thakur	Independent
1999	Hitendra Thakur	Independent
2004	Hitendra Thakur	Independent
2009	Vivek Pandit	Independent
2014	Hitendra Thakur	Bahujan Vikas Aghadi
2019	Hitendra Thakur	Bahujan Vikas Aghadi
2024	Sneha Pandit	Bharatiya Janata Party

== Election results ==
=== Assembly Election 2024 ===
2024 Maharashtra Legislative Assembly election : Vasai
Party	Candidate	Votes	%	±%
BJP	Sneha Pandit	77,553	35.76%	New
BVA	Hitendra Vishnu Thakur	74,400	34.31%	▼20.76
INC	Vijay Govind Patil	62,324	28.74%	New
NOTA	None of the Above	2,346	1.08%	▼0.54
Margin of victory		3,153	1.45%	▼12.45
Turnout		219,220	61.81%	▼0.75
Total valid votes		216,874		
Registered electors		354,683		▲16.41
BJP gain from BVA		Swing	▼19.30	

=== Assembly Election 2019 ===
2019 Maharashtra Legislative Assembly election : Vasai
Party	Candidate	Votes	%	±%
BVA	Hitendra Vishnu Thakur	102,950	55.06%	▲3.22
SS	Vijay Govind Patil	76,955	41.16%	New
MNS	Prafulla Narayan Thakur	3,540	1.89%	▲0.65
NOTA	None of the Above	3,036	1.62%	▲0.04
VBA	Shahid Kamal Shaikh	1,570	0.84%	New
BSP	Anton Victar Dicuna	1,288	0.69%	▲0.19
Margin of victory		25,995	13.90%	▼3.09
Turnout		190,615	62.56%	▼1.94
Total valid votes		186,969		
Registered electors		304,697		▲4.73
BVA hold		Swing	▲3.22	

=== Assembly Election 2014 ===
2014 Maharashtra Legislative Assembly election : Vasai
Party	Candidate	Votes	%	±%
BVA	Hitendra Vishnu Thakur	97,291	51.84%	▲13.47
Independent	Vivek Raghunath Pandit	65,395	34.85%	New
INC	Furtyado Michael Poshan	16,467	8.77%	▲3.61
Independent	Manvel Joseph Tuscano	3,981	2.12%	New
NOTA	None of the Above	2,964	1.58%	New
MNS	Swapnil Santosh Nar	2,329	1.24%	New
Margin of victory		31,896	17.00%	▲7.01
Turnout		190,777	65.57%	▲5.36
Total valid votes		187,665		
Registered electors		290,944		▲2.27
BVA gain from Independent		Swing	▲3.49	

=== Assembly Election 2009 ===
2009 Maharashtra Legislative Assembly election : Vasai
Party	Candidate	Votes	%	±%
Independent	Vivek Raghunath Pandit	81,358	48.35%	New
BVA	Narayan Mankar	64,560	38.37%	New
INC	Adv.Ghonsalvis Jimi Mates	8,695	5.17%	New
Lok Bharati	Datta Nar	3,883	2.31%	New
Independent	Domnic Sabestin D'Melo	3,460	2.06%	New
Independent	Denis Bastyav Lopis	2,229	1.32%	New
Independent	Claid Manvel Martin	1,294	0.77%	New
Margin of victory		16,798	9.98%	▼15.38
Turnout		168,254	59.15%	▲2.40
Total valid votes		168,254		
Registered electors		284,475		▼39.70
Independent hold		Swing	▼12.05	

=== Assembly Election 2004 ===
2004 Maharashtra Legislative Assembly election : Vasai
Party	Candidate	Votes	%	±%
Independent	Hitendra Vishnu Thakur	161,718	60.40%	New
SS	Pandit Vivek Raghunath	93,801	35.04%	▲11.95
BSP	Sukhdev Jayram Khairnar	3,118	1.16%	New
Margin of victory		67,917	25.37%	▼7.97
Turnout		267,820	56.77%	▲13.30
Total valid votes		267,734		
Registered electors		471,777		▲35.49
Independent hold		Swing	▲3.99	

=== Assembly Election 1999 ===
1999 Maharashtra Legislative Assembly election : Vasai
Party	Candidate	Votes	%	±%
Independent	Hitendra Vishnu Thakur	85,352	56.42%	New
SS	Deepak Gavankar	34,924	23.08%	▼1.65
JD(S)	Manuel Joseph Tuscano	24,780	16.38%	New
Independent	Datta Nar	4,974	3.29%	New
Independent	Salman (Babu) Gulam Misal	1,258	0.83%	New
Margin of victory		50,428	33.33%	▲15.99
Turnout		158,093	45.40%	▼14.47
Total valid votes		151,288		
Registered electors		348,201		▲4.17
Independent hold		Swing	▲14.34	

=== Assembly Election 1995 ===
1995 Maharashtra Legislative Assembly election : Vasai
Party	Candidate	Votes	%	±%
Independent	Thakur Appa Urf Hitendra Vishnu	81,463	42.07%	New
SS	Gawhankar Deepak Gajanan	47,888	24.73%	▲15.31
JD	Vichare Vilas Balkrishna	25,102	12.96%	▼16.99
INC	Arun Kasinath Patil	18,050	9.32%	▼50.58
Independent	Pandit Vivek Raghunath	15,552	8.03%	New
Independent	Andrades (Andrat) Mery Michel	1,181	0.61%	New
Margin of victory		33,575	17.34%	▼12.60
Turnout		197,874	59.19%	▼5.38
Total valid votes		193,615		
Registered electors		334,277		▲36.36
Independent gain from INC		Swing	▼17.83	

=== Assembly Election 1990 ===
1990 Maharashtra Legislative Assembly election : Vasai
Party	Candidate	Votes	%	±%
INC	Thakur Appa Urf Hitendra Vishnu	92,958	59.90%	▲14.22
JD	Dominik John Gonsalvis	46,490	29.96%	New
SS	Madan Kini	14,629	9.43%	New
Margin of victory		46,468	29.94%	▲25.73
Turnout		157,822	64.38%	▲4.32
Total valid votes		155,186		
Registered electors		245,147		▲54.70
INC gain from JP		Swing	▲10.01	

=== Assembly Election 1985 ===
1985 Maharashtra Legislative Assembly election : Vasai
Party	Candidate	Votes	%	±%
JP	Gonsalves Dominic John	46,633	49.90%	▲8.54
INC	Tarabai Narsinh Vartak	42,696	45.68%	New
Independent	Patil Dharmaji Narayan	3,681	3.94%	New
Margin of victory		3,937	4.21%	▼4.98
Turnout		95,239	60.10%	▲7.70
Total valid votes		93,462		
Registered electors		158,461		▲18.62
JP gain from INC(I)		Swing	▼0.65	

=== Assembly Election 1980 ===
1980 Maharashtra Legislative Assembly election : Vasai
Party	Candidate	Votes	%	±%
INC(I)	Tarabai Narsinh Vartak	34,627	50.55%	New
JP	Chaudhari Pandharinath Raghunath	28,332	41.36%	▼16.67
BJP	Umesh Vasudev Pai	5,546	8.10%	New
Margin of victory		6,295	9.19%	▼11.76
Turnout		69,710	52.18%	▼22.05
Total valid votes		68,505		
Registered electors		133,588		▲15.63
INC(I) gain from JP		Swing	▼7.48	

=== Assembly Election 1978 ===
1978 Maharashtra Legislative Assembly election : Vasai
Party	Candidate	Votes	%	±%
JP	Chaudhari Pandharinath Raghunath	49,163	58.03%	New
INC	Tarabai Narsinh Vartak	31,412	37.08%	New
SS	Mayekar Bhaskar Sahadeo	4,146	4.89%	New
Margin of victory		17,751	20.95%	
Turnout		86,622	74.98%	
Total valid votes		84,721		
Registered electors		115,526		
JP win (new seat)				

== See also ==
- Vasai
- List of constituencies of Maharashtra Vidhan Sabha
