= Shrinivas Vanga =

Indian politician

Member of Maharashtra Legislative Assembly
- In office 24 October 2019 – 23 November 2024
- Preceded by: Amit Ghoda
- Succeeded by: Rajendra Gavit
- Constituency: Palghar

Personal details
- Party: Shiv Sena

Shrinivas Vanga is an Indian politician serving as Member of the State Maharashtra Legislative Assembly from Palghar Vidhan Sabha constituency as a member of Shiv Sena. He is son of Chintaman Navsha Vanga.

== Positions held ==
- 2019: Elected to Maharashtra Legislative Assembly
