= Kshitij Thakur =

Indian politician

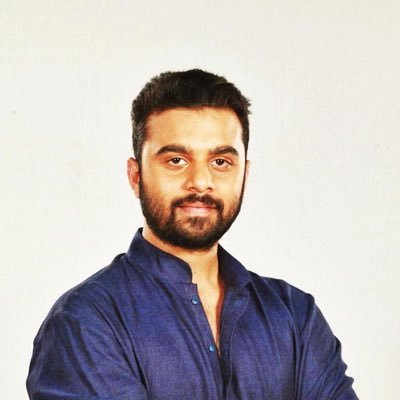

Member of Maharashtra Legislative Assembly
- In office 2009–2024
- Preceded by: Constituency established
- Succeeded by: Rajan Naik
- Constituency: Nalasopara

Personal details
- Born: 10 July 1983 (age 43) Devgaon, Maharashtra, India
- Party: Bahujan Vikas Aghadi
- Spouse: Prachi Galvankar (m.2012)
- Parents: Hitendra Thakur (father); Pravina Thakur (mother)
- Education: University of Mumbai; Harvard University; Stanford University; Baldwin Wallace University
- Occupation: Politician

Kshitij Hitendra Thakur is an Indian politician, who served as a Member of Legislative Assembly from Bahujan Vikas Aghadi (BVA) representing Nalasopara constituency in the Maharashtra State Assembly, from 2009 to 2024.

Thakur's father, Hitendra Thakur, has been a four-time MLA from Vasai and is the president of the Bahujan Vikas Aghadi, a political party with a strong presence in the Vasai-Virar regions of Palghar district in Maharashtra.

== Early life and education ==
Kshitij Thakur was born on 10 July 1983, in Virar area of Palghar district, Maharashtra, India. Thakur holds an MBA degree from Mumbai University. He completed an executive course in Real estate management from Harvard University. He later pursued further studies at Stanford University. He is currently pursuing a Ph.D. from Mumbai University.

== Political career ==
Kshitij Thakur started his political career in 2009, contesting from Nallasopara constituency in the Maharashtra Legislative Assembly after Vasai constituency was delimitated into Vasai, Nallasopara, and Boisar. He ran as a candidate from the Bahujan Vikas Aghadi party and won the election at the age of 26, with a margin of 40,782 votes. His opponents, Shiv Sena and Maharashtra Navnirman Sena, received the second and third-highest votes, respectively. Thakur's victory made him the youngest MLA from the state.

In the 2014 Vidhan Sabha elections, Thakur competed against Rajan Balkrishna Naik from the Bharatiya Janata Party. Thakur secured 1,13,566 votes, while Naik received 59,067 votes, resulting in Thakur's victory. The margin of Thakur's victory over Naik was 54,499 votes.

In the 2024 Vidhan Sabha elections, Thakur competed against Rajan Balkrishna Naik from the BJP and lost by a margin of 36875 votes.

=== 2019 assembly election ===
Thakur won the 2009 and 2014 elections by a significant margin. However, in the 2019 Assembly Elections, he faced strong competition from Shiv Sena candidate Pradeep Sharma, a former Mumbai Police officer and encounter specialist. The pre-poll campaign generated considerable interest in the Nallasopara seat, with Sharma, putting up a strong challenge against Thakur.

During the election campaign, both candidates made allegations against each other, which drew attention to the contest as one of the most closely-watched political battles in the state. Several popular actors, including Govinda, Vinay Anand, Bhalchandra Kadam, and Shreya Bugade, endorsed Thakur during their campaign, while BJP MP Satyapal Singh campaigned in the support of Sharma. Kshitij also secured the backing of Divya Salaskar, the daughter of late city police official Vijay Salaskar who died fighting during the 2008 Mumbai terrorist attack. Kshitij Thakur won the election by a margin of 43,724 votes over Sharma.

== Work ==
During the 2020 COVID-19 lockdown, Kshitij Thakur organized food and ration distribution for those in need. To maintain social distancing, smaller WhatsApp groups were created to connect with nearby kitchens.

In September 2020, on Teacher's Day, Thakur launched the 'School at Home' campaign to bring education to the underprivileged areas of Palghar district, Mumbai. The campaign involves partnering with professors to record syllabus content from Class I to Class X in English and Marathi languages. The videos were released through local cable networks with the help of social organizations, in association with the Vishnu Vaman Thakur Charitable Trust.

In September 2020, he launched the 'Work From My Office' initiative, providing free office space with Wi-Fi and computer facilities for people in Virar, Vasai, Nala Sopara, and surrounding areas. The initiative aimed to address the challenges faced by commuters during the lockdown. Around 30,000 workstations were made available, with physical distancing, frequent sanitization, and temperature-oxygen checks implemented. The initiative received positive feedback from the community. He also converted Viva College in Virar West and Viva Institute of Technology in Virar East, both run by his trust Vishnu Waman Thakur Charitable Trust, into quarantine and isolation centers.

In August 2021, he was appointed the President of the Governing Body of Maharashtra for the Khelo Masters Games Foundation (KMGF), a non-profit organization that aims to promote sports in India.

In 2019, Kshitij Thakur received the Times Power Women and Men Award from The Times Group for his contributions to education, industry and infrastructure development, sports, healthcare, and employment generation in the Vasai-Virar Region of Maharashtra.

== Personal life ==
Thakur is the son of Hitendra Thakur, a four-time MLA and founder of Bahujan Vikas Aaghadi,a political party, and brother of Uttung Hitendra Thakur, a Film producer

Pravina Thakur, who served as the first woman mayor of Vasai Virar Municipal Corporation.

On 29 January 2012, Thakur married Prachi Galvankar, his childhood sweetheart, in a mass wedding ceremony held in Virar, Maharashtra. The wedding was attended by Chief Minister Prithviraj Chavan, then Agriculture Minister Sharad Pawar, and Deputy Chief Minister of Maharashtra Ajit Pawar, as well as Manikrao Thakre, Sanjeev Naik, Vasant Davkhare, Ramdas Kadam, Gopal Shetty, Sanjay Raut, Baliram Sukur Jadhav and several film personalities, including Govinda, Aditya Pancholi, Johnny Lever, Milind Gunaji also attended the ceremony.

== Controversies ==
In March 2013, Thakur was suspended from the Maharashtra Legislative Assembly for allegedly physically assaulting a police officer within the premises of the state assembly. However, Thakur denied assaulting the officer. The home minister R. R. Patil later announced that the police officer was suspended for misbehaving and using foul language against the legislator.
