= Virar =

- City
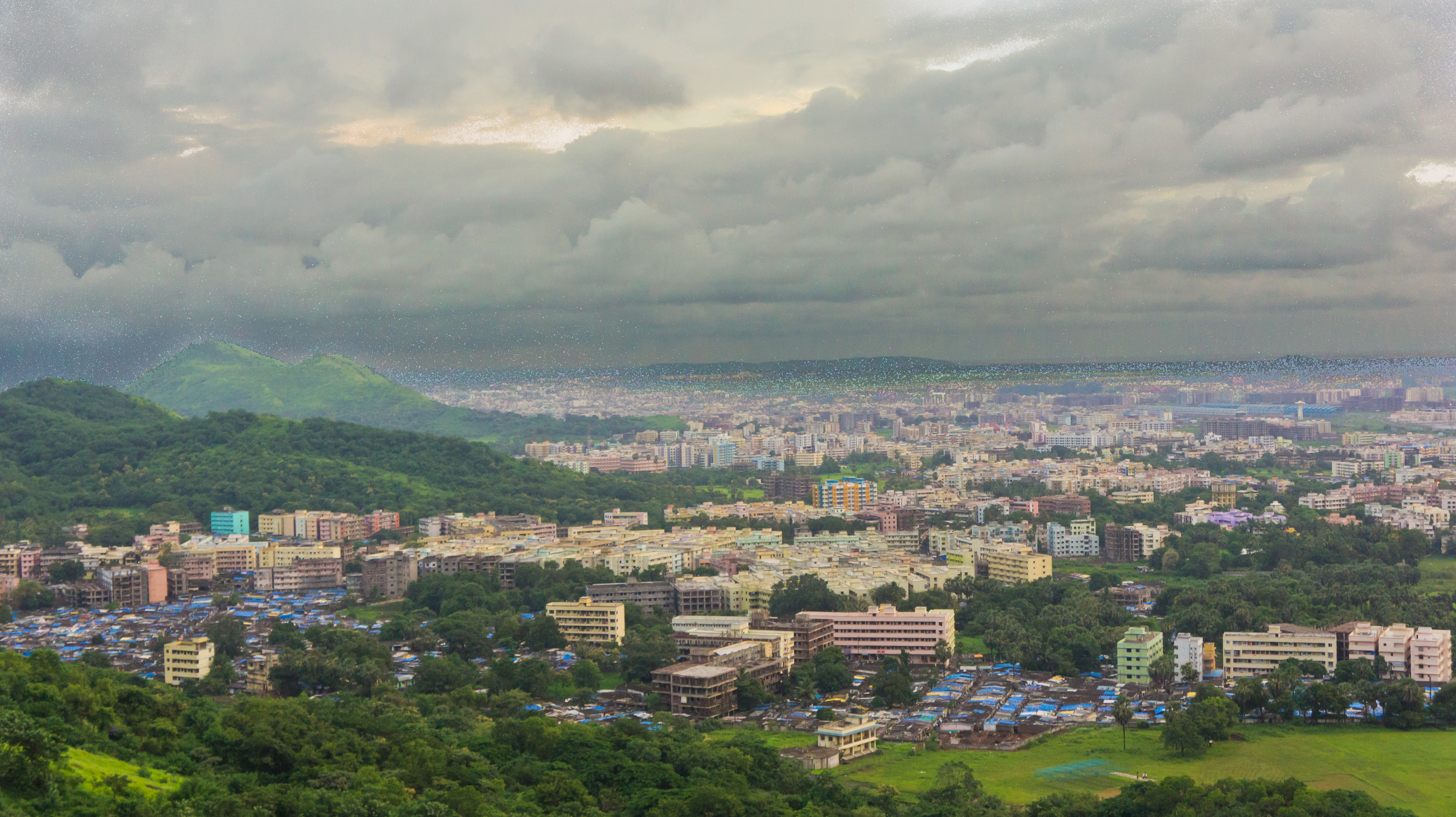
- Panoramic view of the city

- Location within Maharashtra
- Coordinates: 19.47°N 72.8°E
- Country: India
- State: Maharashtra
- District: Palghar
- Division: Konkan

Government
  - Type: Municipal Corporation
  - Body: Vasai-Virar Municipal Corporation
  - Member of Legislative Assembly of Maharashtra.: Rajan Naik
- Elevation: 10 m (33 ft)

Population (2011)
  - Total: 1,221,234

Languages
  - Official: Marathi
- Time zone: UTC+5:30 (IST)
- PIN: Virar (West) – 401303, Virar (East) – 401305
- Telephone code: 91250
- Vehicle registration: MH- 48
- Website: www.vasaivirar.com

Virar (Pronunciation: [ʋiɾaːɾ]) is a coastal city in the Palghar district, Maharashtra, India. The northern third of the city of Vasai-Virar, is administered by the Vasai-Virar Municipal Corporation. It lies to the south of the Palghar district, and to the north of the city of Mumbai. It is an important part of the Palghar District because it forms the outermost part on the northern side of the Mumbai Metropolitan Region and comes under the police jurisdiction of Mira-Bhayander, Vasai-Virar Police Commissionerate.

Virar railway station is one of the prominent railway stations on the Western Line of the Mumbai Suburban Railway being the station on the line with a high frequency of local-train transit for both ends: Palghar (Dahanu) as well as Churchgate (South Mumbai).

As per provisional reports of Census of India, population of Virar in 2011 was 1,222,390; of which males and females were 648,172 and 574,218, respectively.

== History ==
Virar is mentioned as Vihar in the 15th-17th century Marathi-language text Mahikavatichi Bakhar.

== Demographics ==
According to the 2011 India census, Virar had a population of 1,221,233. Virar has an average literacy rate of 91.95%, higher than the national average of 59.5%.

Over a period of time Virar has become a cosmopolitan suburb with approximately 50% population being Marathi speaking and the rest a mix of other communities, mainly the Gujaratis and the Catholics. 70% of the population is below 30 years. The slow and gradual adoption of the cosmopolitan nature of the city is the result of migration from the Mumbai mainland to this part due to ever increasing cost of the real estate property.

Among minority languages, Gujarati is spoken by 28.30% of the population and Hindi by 15.31%. The local Communities like Samvedi Brahmin, Kupari, Vadwals, Bhandhari, Panmali, Aagri have their local dialects of Konkani which are widely spoken in these communities.

== Infrastructure ==
The growth of Virar is yet to be seen in full as the quadrupling of the railway line between Borivali and Virar has just taken place in 2007. The railways are still pleading the lack of sufficient number of rakes to take full advantage of the quadrupling.

The Global City developed by Rustomjee and Evershine builders is a township spread over an area of more than 200 acers leading to significant development and new settlements.

The city has seen a lot of development in the past 5 years. The Municipal Council was upgraded to Vasai-Virar City Municipal Corporation in May 2009. There are various housing and road transport development projects initiated by the corporation with the help of MMRDA, Mumbai. The skywalk in the west section of the city was one of the first amongst the many skywalks that were built near all the railway stations of Mumbai. It was the seventh skywalk in the city and it cost INR 91.5 million. Virar-West skywalk is 589 meters long with four meters wide walkway. The skywalk was found to be the busiest amongst the others built by the MMRDA by recording a footfall of 58,038 commuters during peak hours. It was followed by Santa Cruz skywalk with a figure of 37,546.

Virar-Alibaug Corridor Project is a project undertaken by the MMRDA. The Rs 10,000-crore project is expected to provide seamless connectivity by the metro as well as by road from Alibaug to Virar. The corridor will bypass the western and eastern suburbs and also the routes which will witness growth in the future. The proposed alignment will connect four crucial national highways, NH8 (Mumbai-Ahmedabad), NH3 (Mumbai-Agra-Delhi), NH4 (Mumbai-Chennai) and NH17 (Goa-Mangalore-Kerala). The MMRDA has claimed that the 140-km corridor will reduce the long commute to barely an hour. Phase-I of the corridor will be of 90 km from Virar to Panvel. Phase-II will be of 50 km from Panvel to Alibaug.

== Governance ==
Virar falls under the jurisdiction of the newly created Vasai-Virar Municipal Corporation (VVMC). It primarily comes in the Nalla Sopara constituency for the Maharashtra Legislative Assembly elections and in the Palghar constituency for the Lok Sabha elections. For all the three seats, the ruling party, the Bahujan Vikas Aaghadi (BVA), has shown its dominance over the past few decades. The BVA has won 55 seats out of the 89 in the VVMC; thus, Virar elected its first Mayor in the form of Shri. Rajeev Patil, who was also the ex-President of the preceding Virar Municipal Council. For the Legislative Assembly seat, Kshitij Thakur, a BVA candidate and the son of the ex-MLA of the region, Hitendra Thakur, won the seat in 2009, defeating Shirish Chavan of the Shiv Sena by more than 40,000 votes at just 26 years of age. Earlier, in the 15th Lok Sabha elections, people voted for Baliram Sukur Jadhav, also a BVA candidate, from the Palghar constituency, who went on to become the member of parliament representing the region, defeating a Bharatiya Janata Party rival, advocate Chintaman Vanga, by 12,358 votes.

== Culture ==
The Jivdani Mata Temple is a 150-year-old Hindu shrine located atop Jivdani Hill in eastern Virar, Maharashtra. It is one of the few temples in the country dedicated to Goddess Jivdani. The site is accessible via a flight of approximately 1,400 steps and receives a high volume of visitors, particularly on Sundays and during local festivals.It also has a cable lift for easy access.
