= Baliram Sukur Jadhav =

Indian politician

MP, Palghar (Lok Sabha constituency)
- In office 2009 – 3 June 2014
- Preceded by: Constituency created
- Succeeded by: Chintaman Vanaga
- Constituency: Palghar

Personal details
- Born: 2 June 1956 (age 70) Thane district, Maharashtra
- Party: Bahujan Vikas Aaghadi
- Spouse: Vanita Baliram Jadhav
- Children: 4
- Parent(s): Sukur Nago Jadhav, Shalubai Sukur Jadhav
- Education: 8th Pass
- Alma mater: Vageshwari New English School
- Profession: Politician, Agriculture

Baliram Sukur Jadhav (born 2 June 1956) is an Indian politician. He represented Palghar (Lok Sabha constituency) in the 15th Lok Sabha and he is a member of the Bahujan Vikas Aaghadi political party, headed by Hitendra Thakur.

== Personal life ==
Baliram Jadhav was born in the Thane district of Maharashtra. He was born on 2 June 1956 to Sukur and Shalubai Jadhav. He is married to Vanita Baliram Jadhav, who herself had contested the Thane Zilla Parishad post, but lost to Anita Ramu Dhangda. They have four children, 1 son and 3 daughters. He himself is a farmer in the Saiwan area of Vasai Taluka in the district of Thane, Maharashtra.

== Political career ==
=== 15th Lok Sabha ===
Baliram Jadhav contested the 15th Lok Sabha elections as an independent candidate from the Palghar constituency. He was backed by the strong support of former Member of Legislative Assembly Hitendra Thakur, who gave him the candidature of his political party, Bahujan Vikas Aaghadi which had a strong foothold in the region.

Thakur's support and the delimitation of the Palghar constituency, backed with the developmental work done by Jadhav for the tribal region in the past worked in favor of him. He won the seat by gaining a majority of 223,234 votes, around 12,360 more than his next counterpart, Advocate Chintaman Vanaga of the Bhartiya Janata Party. Sitting MP, Damodar Barku Shingada of the Indian National Congress was pushed to third, owing majorly to the loss of his votebank in the neighbouring Bhiwandi constituency, post delimitation. Thus, becoming the first MP from the Palghar (Lok Sabha constituency).

He was the member of the Social Justice & Empowerment Committee in the 15th Lok Sabha.

It is said that Jadhav, after pledging his unconditional support to the UPA government, played a key role in gaining the approval for the recently created Vasai-Virar Municipal Corporation, a long awaited move.

He is very active in the tribal region of Vasai. He has many things on his agenda that include upliftment of the adivasi population in the region, solving the water problem in the area, demanding quick installation of the much-needed Virar-Dahanu local train services and cutting down the load shedding time in the region.

=== 2014 Lok Sabha Elections ===
In the 2014 Lok Sabha elections, he lost his seat to Bharatiya Janata Party's Chintaman Vanaga by a margin of 239,520 votes.

=== 2018 Palghar Constituency By-Elections ===
He came a distant third in the 2018 Palghar by-elections necessitated due to the demise of incumbent MP, Chintaman Vanaga. The seat was won by Bharatiya Janata Party's Rajendra Gavit with Shiv Sena's Shrinivas Vanga coming second.

=== 2019 Lok Sabha Elections ===
He once again lost to Rajendra Gavit who was contesting on a Shiv Sena ticket in the 2019 Indian general elections for the same seat by a margin of 88,883 votes.

== Criminal cases and financial assets ==
According to Jadhav's affidavit submitted to the Election Commission of India while filing his nomination for 2019 Indian general elections, Jadhav had assets worth ₹20,285,716.

He declared he had 3 pending criminal cases, two filed on 18 June 2011 at Nalasopara Police Station and one on 24 November 2017 at Virar Police Station.
