= Palghar Lok Sabha constituency =

Lok Sabha constituency in Maharashtra

Coordinates: 19.7°N 72.8°E

Palghar Lok Sabha
- Lok Sabha constituency
- Palghar Lok Sabha Constituency map

Constituency details
- Country: India
- Region: Western India
- State: Maharashtra
- Assembly constituencies: Dahanu; Vikramgad; Palghar; Boisar; Nalasopara; Vasai
- Established: 19 February 2008
- Total electors: 21,48,514
- Reservation: ST

Member of Parliament
- 18th Lok Sabha
- Incumbent Hemant Vishnu Savara
- Party: BJP
- Alliance: NDA
- Elected year: 2024
- Preceded by: Rajendra Dhedya Gavit

Palghar Lok Sabha constituency is one of the 48 Lok Sabha (lower house of Indian parliament) constituencies of Maharashtra state in western India. This constituency was created on 19 February 2008 as a part of the implementation of the Presidential notification based on the recommendations of the Delimitation Commission of India constituted on 12 July 2002. The seat is reserved for Scheduled Tribes. It first held elections in 2009 and its first member of parliament (MP) was Baliram Sukur Jadhav of Bahujan Vikas Aghadi. As of the 2014 election, Chintaman Vanaga of the Bharatiya Janata Party represented this constituency in the Lok Sabha. After sudden demise of Chintaman Vanaga, Bharatiya Janata Party gave ticket to Rajendra Gavit for by-elections.

== Assembly segments ==
Palghar Lok Sabha constituency comprises six Vidhan Sabha (legislative assembly) segments. These segments are:

Constituency number	Name	Reserved for (SC/ST/None)	District	Party	2024 Lead
128	Dahanu	ST	Palghar	CPI(M)	SS(UBT)
129	Vikramgad	ST	Palghar	BJP	BJP
130	Palghar	ST	Palghar	SHS	BJP
131	Boisar	ST	Palghar	SHS	BJP
132	Nalasopara	None	Palghar	BJP	BJP
133	Vasai	None	Palghar	BJP	BJP

== Members of Parliament ==
Year	Name	Party
Before 2008 : See Dahanu
2009	Baliram Jadhav	Bahujan Vikas Aghadi
2014	Chintaman Vanaga	Bharatiya Janata Party
2018^	Rajendra Gavit	Bharatiya Janata Party
2019	Rajendra Gavit	Shiv Sena
2024	Hemant Savara	Bharatiya Janata Party

== Election results ==
=== 2024 ===
2024 Indian general elections: Palghar
Party	Candidate	Votes	%	±%
BJP	Hemant Savara	601,244	43.69	New
SS(UBT)	Bharti Bharat Kamdi	4,17,938	30.37	New
BVA	Rajesh Raghunath Patil	2,54,517	18.50	▼28.40
NOTA	None of the Above	23,385	1.70	▼0.75
Majority		1,83,306	13.32	▲10.92
Turnout		13,76,677	64.07	▲0.31
BJP gain from SS		Swing		

=== 2019 ===
2019 Indian general elections: Palghar
Party	Candidate	Votes	%	±%
SS	Rajendra Dhedya Gavit	580,479	48.28	
BVA	Baliram Jadhav	4,91,596	40.89	
VBA	Suresh Padavi	13,728	1.14	
NOTA	None of the Above	29,479	2.45	
Majority		88,883	7.39	
Turnout		12,02,197	63.76	
SS gain from BJP		Swing		

=== By election 2018 ===
Bye-Election, 2018: Palghar
Party	Candidate	Votes	%	±%
BJP	Rajendra Dhedya Gavit	272,782	30.76	−22.96
SS	Shrinivas Chintaman Vanaga	2,43,210	27.42	
BVA	Baliram Sukur Jadhav	2,22,838	25.13	−4.46
CPI(M)	Kiran Raja Gahala	71,887	8.11	+0.36
INC	Damodar Barku Shingada	47,714	5.38	
NOTA	None of the Above	16,884	1.90	−0.30
Margin of victory		29,572	3.34	
Turnout		8,86,873	51.23	
BJP hold		Swing		

=== General election 2014 ===
2014 Indian general elections: Palghar
Party	Candidate	Votes	%	±%
BJP	Chintaman Vanaga	533,201	53.72	+24.94
BVA	Baliram Jadhav	2,93,681	29.59	−0.88
CPI(M)	Kharpade Ladkya Rupa	76,890	7.75	−4.84
AAP	Pandurang Jethya Pardhi	16,182	1.63	N/A
Independent	Haribhau Soma Vartha	12,974	1.31	N/A
BMP	Dilip Atmaram Dumada	10,742	1.08	N/A
BSP	Gavari Shyam Anant	8,176	0.82	−0.51
Independent	Sachin Damodar Shingda	7,957	0.80	N/A
BBM	Mohan Barku Guhe	6,691	0.67	−0.37
Independent	Kashinath Laxman Kokera	4,327	0.44	N/A
NOTA	None of the Above	21,797	2.20	N/A
Margin of victory		2,39,520	24.13	+22.45
Turnout		9,92,618	62.90	+14.80
BJP gain from BVA		Swing	+12.91	

=== General election 2009 ===
2009 Indian general elections: Palghar
Party	Candidate	Votes	%	±%
BVA	Baliram Jadhav	223,234	30.47	
BJP	Chintaman Vanaga	2,10,875	28.78	
INC	Damodar Shingada	1,60,570	21.92	
CPI(M)	Lahanu Kom	92,224	12.59	
Independent	Pandurang Jethya Paradhi	20,363	2.78	
BSP	Dalavi Bhaskar Ladku	9,741	1.33	
Independent	Kashiram Mahadu Dhondaga	7,968	1.09	
BBM	Chandrakant Balu Phupane	7,613	1.04	
Margin of victory		12,360	1.68	
Turnout		7,32,587	48.10	
BVA win (new seat)				

== See also ==
- Mumbai North Lok Sabha constituency
- Dahanu Lok Sabha constituency
- Thane district
- List of constituencies of the Lok Sabha
