= Bhoye Harishchandra Sakharam =

Indian politician

Member of the Maharashtra Legislative Assembly
- Incumbent
- Assumed office 2024
- Preceded by: Sunil Chandrakant Bhusara
- Constituency: Vikramgad

Personal details
- Political party: Bharatiya Janata Party
- Profession: Politician

Bhoye Harishchandra Sakharam is an Indian politician from Maharashtra. He is a member of the Maharashtra Legislative Assembly from 2024, representing Vikramgad Assembly constituency as a member of the Bharatiya Janata Party.

== See also ==
- List of chief ministers of Maharashtra
- Maharashtra Legislative Assembly
