= Vilas Tare =

Indian politician

Member of the Maharashtra Legislative Assembly
- In office 2024 – 2029 (third terms)
- Preceded by: Rajesh Raghunath Patil
- Constituency: Boisar

Personal details
- Party: Shiv-Sena
- Other political affiliations: Shivsena; Bhartiya Janta Party; Bahujan Vikas Aghadi
- Occupation: Politician

Vilas Tare is a politician in Shiv Sena Palghar district. He was a member of Maharashtra Legislative Assembly representing Boisar Vidhan Sabha constituency from 2009 to 2019. Vilas Tare belonged to Bahujan Vikas Aghadi Party before joining Shiv Sena. From his childhood he belongs to a poor and Aadivasi family. Being very helpful, he wanted to make changes in Maharashtra, so he decided to enter politics and he succeeded. He was an MLA in Bahujan Vikas Aghadi Party.

He was once again successful to become the MLA of Boisar Assembly Constituency after the elections held in November 2024 by defeating the opponent of BVA Bahujan Vikas Aghadi sitting MLA Rajesh Rahunath Patil by a huge margin.

== Positions held ==
- 2009: Elected to Maharashtra Legislative Assembly
- 2014: Elected to Maharashtra Legislative Assembly
- 2024: Elected to Maharashtra Legislative Assembly
