= Vivek Raghunath Pandit =

Indian social worker

Member of Maharashtra Legislative Assembly
- In office 2009–2014
- Preceded by: Hitendra Thakur
- Succeeded by: Hitendra Thakur
- Constituency: Vasai

Personal details
- Born: Vivek Raghunath Pandit; August 23, 1957 (age 68) Dahanu, Maharashtra
- Party: Independent
- Other political affiliations: Shiv Sena (Till 2009)

Vivek Raghunath Pandit alias Bhau is an Indian social worker. After completing his education, he left Mumbai and went to the rural areas with his wife Vidyullata. Initially, he started developmental work helping the poor from Dahisar village in Vasai. In 1982 he established an organization called Shramajeevi Sanghatana. He helped release bonded labors. For his excellent work in this area, he was awarded The International Anti-slavery award in 1999. He was also elected to the Maharashtra Legislative Assembly from Vasai, Maharashtra in the 2009 Maharashtra Legislative Assembly election as an independent with the support of Shiv Sena. Presently he is the President of the state level Tribal Area review committee in the Maharashtra government with the status of state minister.

His writing include Bandhmukthi,Akher Salvlya Jinklach and Parighavarun in Marathi and English and a Handbook on the Prevention of Atrocities Act and The Fury of Hunger and Fearles Minds in English.
