= Uttung Hitendra Thakur =

Indian film producer

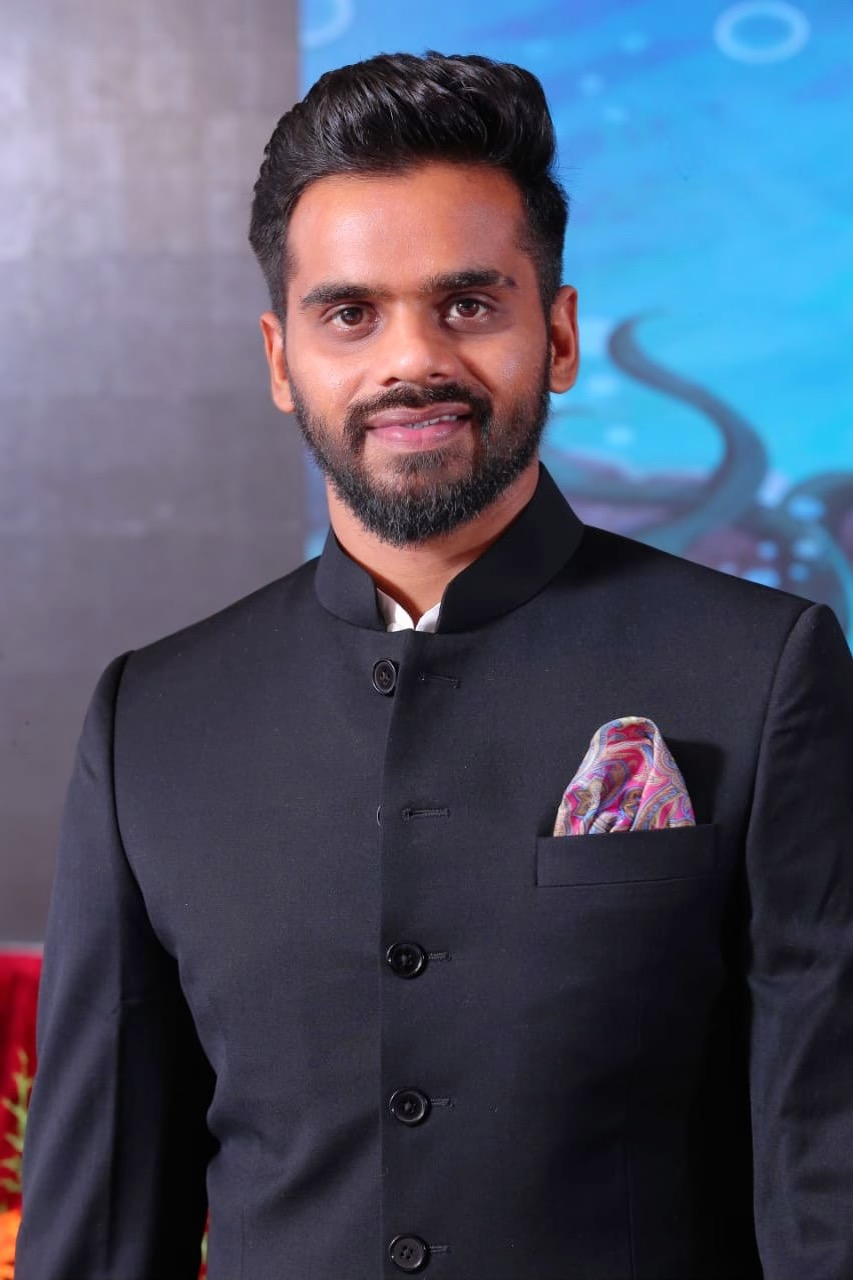
- Born: Uttung Hitendra Thakur
- Occupation: Film Producer
- Years active: 2013–present
- Father: Hitendra Thakur
- Relatives: Kshitij Thakur (brother)
- Awards: 61st National Film Award – Special Jury Award 2013

Uttung Hitendra Thakur is an Indian film producer known for the films Balak Palak and Yellow. Thakur made his debut as a film producer with the Marathi film Balak Palak on the topic of sex education, co-produced by Riteish Deshmukh and directed by Ravi Jadhav. He also remade Balak Palak in Malayalam as Swarna Malsyangal. Balak Palak created a world record through UFO Moviez and Valuable Edutainment as India's first multi-locational interactive Live Premiere of Marathi film on 3 January 2013.

== Career ==
Uttung Thakur made his debut as a film producer with the Marathi film Balak Palak in 2013.

In 2014, Thakur produced a Marathi film Yellow directed by Mahesh Limaye and co-produced by Riteish Deshmukh and the story explores a mother/daughter relationship involving developmental disability and childlike behaviour. Thakur's Yellow also won the Special Jury Award, while the child actors Gauri Gadgil and Sanjana Rai received Special Mention at 61st National Film Awards.

Thakur produced a Marathi film named Dokyala Shot in 2019, directed by debutant Shivkumar Parthasarathy. Singer Mika Singh made Marathi debut with "Dokyala Shot". Also actor Prajakta Mali and Suvrat Joshi made their debut as singers in Dokyala Shot.

In 2020, Thakur produced a marathi film Vikun Taak, where Bollywood actor Chunky Panday made debut in Marathi films.

== Filmography ==
Year	Title	Language
2013	Balak Palak	Marathi
2014	Yellow	Marathi
2019	Swarna Malsyangal	Malayalam
2019	Dokyala Shot	Marathi
2020	Vikun Taak	Marathi

== Awards and nominations ==
- 61st National Film Award – Special Jury Award 2013.
