= Yellow (2014 film) =

- Theatrical release poster
- Directed by: Mahesh Limaye
- Written by: Ambar Hadap; Ganesh Pandit
- Produced by: Riteish Deshmukh; Uttung Thakur
- Starring: Mrinal Kulkarni; Upendra Limaye; Hrishikesh Joshi; Manoj Joshi; Aishwarya Narkar
- Cinematography: Mahesh Limaye
- Edited by: Jayant Jathar
- Production company: Mumbai Film Company
- Release date: 4 April 2014
- Country: India
- Language: Marathi

Yellow is a 2014 Marathi film directed by Mahesh Limaye and produced by Riteish Deshmukh and Uttung Thakur. The story explores a mother/daughter relationship involving developmental disability and childlike behaviour.

The directorial debut film is based on a true story of Gauri Gadgil, a child with special needs, who also plays herself in the film. The film was released on 4 April 2014 to critical acclaim. The film second film of actor Riteish Deshmukh as producer after Balak-Palak (2013).

At the 61st National Film Awards, it won the Special Jury Award, while the child actors Gauri Gadgil and Sanjana Rai received Special Mention.

== Summary ==
Mugdha (Mrinal Kulkarni) and Shekhar (Manoj Joshi) are parents of Gauri (Gauri Gadgil), a child with Down syndrome having mental disability. Despite her unsupportive husband, Mugdha wants to bring Gauri up normally. She separates from her husband and starts living with her brother Shri (Hrishikesh Joshi). However Gauri remains tough to handle, till she discovers her love for swimming. Thus Mugdha gets her enrolled for coaching for competitive swimming training with coach Pratap Sardeshmukh (Upendra Limaye).

== Cast ==
- Mrinal Kulkarni as Mughdha
- Gauri Gadgil as Gauri
- Upendra Limaye as Pratap Sardeshmukh
- Hrishikesh Joshi as Shri
- Manoj Joshi as Shekhar
- Usha Nadkarni
- Aishwarya Narkar
- Dhwani Rajput

== Release ==
The first look promo of the film was released in January 2014.

== Awards ==
Award/Festival	Category	Result
61st National Film Awards	Special Jury Award	Won
61st National Film Awards	Special Mention (Feature Film) for Gauri Gadgil (Child actor)	Won
61st National Film Awards	Special Mention (Feature Film) for Sanjana Rai (Child actor)	Won

== See also ==
- List of Marathi films of 2014
