= Samvedi =

Indian Hindu Brahmin community

Samvedi Brahmin
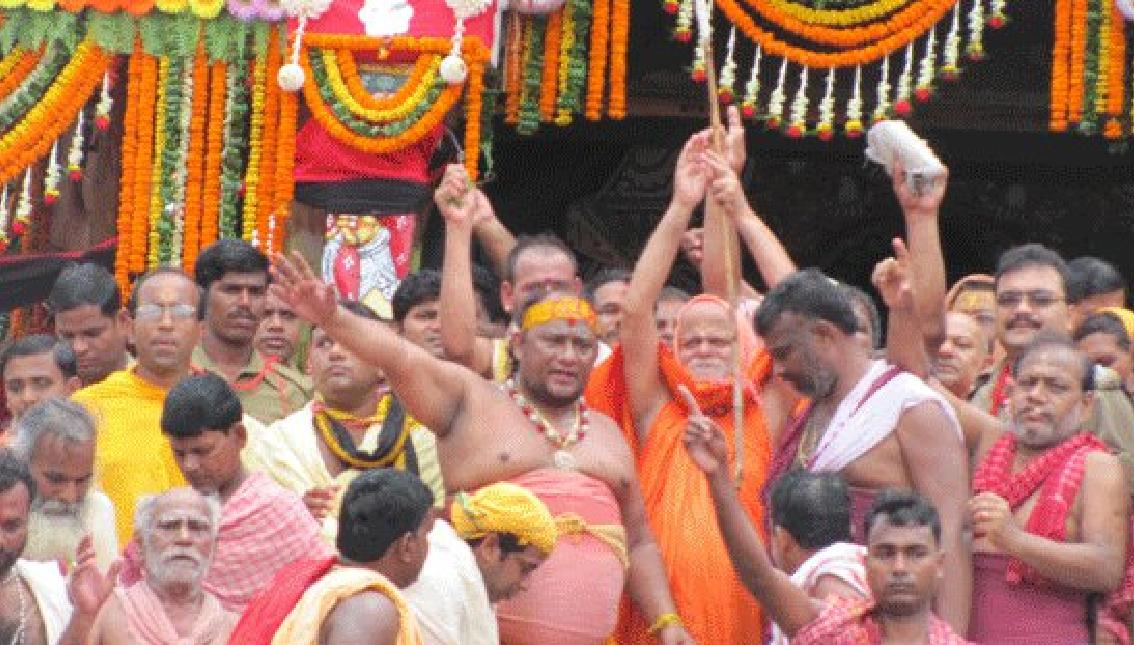
- Shankararcharya of Puri (center) during Rath Yatra
- Religions: Hinduism
- Languages: Hindi, Samvedi, Marathi, Odia, Telugu, Bengali
- Country: India
- Original state: Maharashtra
- Populated states: Odisha, West Bengal, Jharkhand, Chhattisgarh, Madhya Pradesh, Andhra Pradesh
- Ethnicity: Marathi, Odia, Telugu, Bengali people
- Related groups: Kupari, Utkala Brahmins, Kanyakubja Brahmins, Maithil Brahmins, Gauda Brahmins, Saraswat Brahmins

Samvedis or Samvedi Brahmins are an Indian Hindu Brahmin community, originating from a group of classical musicians and classical dancers. They follow Sama Veda and believed to have been originated from Odisha, India.

== Etymology ==
Samvedis are also known as Shamedi near Vasai. It is a colloquial term from the original Sanskrit word Shamaneedresh (Shaman = Entertainment, Edresh = Attributed), meaning those workers in the royal court entertaining the King. The then king appointed these people to offer music services at the Samadhi place, thus they were called Samaadhi which later became Shamedi meaning the Samadhi Temple musicians.

Shamedis offer their services using musical instruments such as Sanai, Choughada, Mridanga, Bheri and Veena during the dawn and night worship at Nirmal Jagadguru Shankaracharya Samadhi Mandir, Shri Sureshwar (Suleshwar) Mandir and the Bhavani Shankara Mandir (Agassi). Their deity is Nirmaleshwar, located on the Nirmal Hillock of Vasai.

== History ==
The history of Vasai dates back to Treta Yug. Vasai or Bassein used to be known as Oppire/ Orparak/ Shorparag/ Shurparaka. It was founded by Bhagawan Parashuram himself. Bhagavan Parashuram established Vimaleshwar Mandir and Vimala Sarovar. He consecrated 64 yoginis in and around Vasai since the yoginis were considered to be the devotees of his mother Renuka. He also established 108 Teertha Kundas or Pushkarinis in Vasai. The reference of these places can be found in Hindu scriptures like Skanda Purana and Padma Purana.

Samvedis came as expert singers to Shurparak (Vasai) during the Buddha era 1500 BC from the remote areas of Odisha, then called as Utkala/Kalinga.

During the Buddhist rule, their Vedic Dharma was loosened. Purna, the disciple of Gautama Buddha, belonged to Vasai preached in the Eastern India. At the advent of Adi Shankaracharya in Nirmal around 497 BC,Samvedis returned to their original Hindu fold and started strict following of the Vedic Dharma. They regarded Adi Sankara Jagadguru as their cardinal preacher. This is quoted in Holy Text Siva Leela Amrut.

Even after the advent of Shankaracharya, some Buddhists were left who used to criticize the Vedic Philosophy. King Jalauka took the then Jagat Guru Shankaracharya of Eastern India, Swami Vidyaranya to Shurparaga. He strongly revived the Vedic Dharma. Due to old age and at the earnest prayers of the local Samvedis and Bhandaris, Swami Vidyaranya took Mahasamadhi at the Nirmal Vimaleshwar Mandir in 404 BC on the dark 11th day of Kartik. Emperor Jalauka (son of Ashoka) built a big Samadhi Mandir according to the Odisha architecture.

Jagadguru Shankaracharya Narayan Upendra Swami of Jyotish Peetm at Sureswar Mandir, Nirmal

The grand disciple of Swami Vidyaranya, Swami Padmanabha Tirtha, the 7th Jagadguru Sankaracharya of Puri Govardhan Peetham arrived in Vasai during the Vijaya Yatra. His Holiness stayed here for some months and later decided to reside eternally at this place of his Guru. Swami Padmanadha Tirtha Shankaracharya was a devotee of Lord Vallabha (Krishna). So, a temple devoted to Lord Krishna in front of his Samadhi was erected by the then Kashmiri Brahmin community who used to reside in Nirmal, the murti of Lord Krishna brought by Raja Jalauka, from the area around Shankaracharya Parbat, Srinagar, (Jammu and Kashmir).

The 38th Shankaracharya Swami Shivananda Saraswati of Puri Govardhan Peetham visited Nirmal Hillock during the rule of the Satavahana rule.

During the times of Raja Bhimdev of Kalinga in order to solve the religious differences in between the Kshatriyas, the 106th Shankaracharya Swami Sukhabodha Tirtha arrived in Vasai during the 13th century AD.

This Holy place was also visited by Swami Vidyaranya, the 13th Shankaracharya of Sringeri Sharada Peetham in the 15th century. His samadhi is located at Hampi, Karnataka.

=== During Portuguese rule ===
During 1543, Portuguese started their rule and destroyed various cultural places in Vasai. The temple of Padmanabha Swami which was located at the hillock place now called Nirmal Naka was destroyed. The Brahmins, Shamedis, and Bhandaris who regarded Jagadguru Shankaracharya as their Holy Guru were sad at this ill act and they brought the stones of the samadhi of Padmanabha Swami and placed them in the left side of Vidyaranya Swami Samadhi Mandir. During this period, 200 religious places were destroyed by foreigners in Bassein. The atrocities of the Portuguese were on the rise. People then requested Chimaji Appa Peshwa to liberate them. He attacked Portuguese and conquered Vasai in the 18th century AD.

At the guidance of Swami Vidya Shankara Bharati, Chimaji Appa renovated, the Samadhi Mandir of Swami Vidyaranya and Swami Padmanabha Tirtha, the 5th and 7th Shankaracharya of Puri Peetham in Kalinga architecture style.

Due to the atrocities of Portuguese rulers this place was devoid of Brahmins. Under the guidance of Swami Vidya Shankara Bharati, Chimaji Appa Peshwa, in consultations with Peshwa Bajirao, appointed one Konkanastha Chitpavan Brahmin, one Karhade Brahmin, one Devrukhe Brahmin and 4-5 Shukla Yajurvedi Gujrati Brahmins in this region.

The above assumption seems to be stemming from the lone fact that the Sama Veda is more dedicated to music. Surprisingly these surnames appear elsewhere also and they are more related to the feudatory system. The Brahmins may have acquired these surnames during the Peshwa rule in Vasai Belt.

In Odisha, Brahmins of Gautama gotra having Tripathy and Nanda surnames are Samvedis.

== Profession of Shamedis ==
The traditional profession of Samvedis was to present Music, Dance, and Dramas at the Royal Palaces and in the Hindu temples as a part of the social awareness of religion. Later during the period of Raja Pratap Bimba the profession shifted to that of cultivating sugarcane and nagavel leaves. The cultivation of paddy was added to the profession in the late 17th century.

Later during the 18th century after the opening of the Mumbai (Bombay) as the chief city, the profession switched over to the gardening of flowers and wadis.

Presently many Samvedis are engaged in the professions like Politics, Medicine, School Administration, Construction, Business and Management.

== Notable people ==
- Rajan Naik
- Ayush Mhatre

== See also ==
- Vasai#Samvedi (brahmin)
- Roman Catholic Brahmin
