= Sneha Pandit =

Indian politician

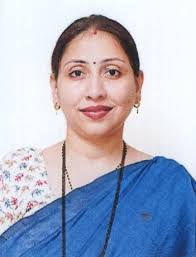

Member of the Maharashtra Legislative Assembly
- Incumbent
- Assumed office 2024
- Preceded by: Hitendra Thakur
- Constituency: Vasai

Personal details
- Political party: Bharatiya Janata Party
- Profession: Politician

Sneha Dube Pandit is an Indian politician from Maharashtra. She is a member of the Maharashtra Legislative Assembly from 2024, representing Vasai Assembly constituency as a member of the Bharatiya Janata Party.

== See also ==
- List of chief ministers of Maharashtra
- Maharashtra Legislative Assembly
