= Sunil Chandrakant Bhuasara =

Indian politician

Sunil Chandrakant Bhusara (born 1979) is an Indian politician from Maharashtra. He is an MLA from Vikramgad Assembly constituency, which is reserved for Scheduled Tribe community, in Palghar District. He won the 2019 Maharashtra Legislative Assembly election representing the Nationalist Congress Party.

== Early life and education ==
Bhusara is from Vikramgad, Palghar District, Maharashtra. He is the son of Bhusara Chandrakant Ravji. He completed his Class 10 at Karmaveer Bhaurao Patil High School and later did his Class 12 in 1998 at the Junior college, Mokhada Taluka. Palghar District.

== Career ==
Bhusara won from Vikramgad Assembly constituency representing Nationalist Congress Party in the 2019 Maharashtra Legislative Assembly election. He polled 88,425 votes and defeated his nearest rival, Hemant Savara of Bharatiya Janata Party, by a margin of 21,399 votes. Earlier, he lost the 2009 and 2014 elections. In the 2014 Maharashtra Legislative Assembly election, the NCP candidate lost the Vikramgad seat finishing third behind winner Vishnu Savara of Bharatiya Janata Party and Prakash Krushna Nikam of Shiv Sena, who came second.
