= Kadodi language =

Marathi–Konkani language of India

Samvedi
- Kadodi
- कादोडी, सामवेदी
- Native to: India
- Region: Maharashtra
- Ethnicity: Samvedi
- Native speakers: 60,000 (2016)
- Language family: Indo-European: Indo-Iranian; Indo-Aryan; Southern Zone; Marathi–Konkani; Samvedi

Language codes
- ISO 639-3: smv
- Glottolog: samv1238

Samvedi is the language spoken by the Samvedi Brahmin and Kupari (Samvedi Christian) community in Vasai, Maharashtra, India. The language has evolved as an intermediate dialect of Marathi and Konkani, incorporating significant lexical and phonetic influences from Portuguese as well as elements found in Goan speech patterns.

== Origin and Historical Background ==
Samvedi developed over centuries through sustained interaction among local communities. The Kupari people trace their ancestry to Samvedi Brahmins, Goan Konkani Brahmins, and Portuguese New Christians—a legacy of intermarriages during the Portuguese colonial period. These historical contacts introduced Indo-Portuguese loanwords and distinct pronunciation features, resulting in a dialect that reflects a blend of Marathi, Konkani, Goan, and Indo-Portuguese influences. Although Samvedi has traditionally been an oral language without an independent literary tradition, it is commonly rendered using the Devanagari script.

== See also ==
- List of Kadodi words and Kadodi to Marathi word meanings
