= Palghar Assembly constituency =

Constituency of the Maharashtra legislative assembly in India

Coordinates: 19.70°N 72.77°E

Palghar
- Constituency No. 130 for the Maharashtra Legislative Assembly

Constituency details
- Country: India
- Region: Western India
- State: Maharashtra
- District: Palghar
- Lok Sabha constituency: Palghar
- Established: 1955
- Total electors: 298,608
- Reservation: ST

Member of Legislative Assembly
- 15th Maharashtra Legislative Assembly
- Incumbent Rajendra Gavit
- Party: SHS
- Alliance: NDA
- Elected year: 2024

Palghar Assembly constituency is one of the 288 Vidhan Sabha (legislative assembly) constituencies of Maharashtra state, western India. This constituency is located in Palghar district.

== Geographical scope ==
The constituency comprises parts of Dahanu Taluka viz. revenue circles Kasa and Chinchani, parts of Palghar Taluka viz. revenue circles Tarapur, Palghar and Palghar Municipal Council.

== Members of the Legislative Assembly ==
Year	Member	Party
1957	Navnitrai Shah	Praja Socialist Party
1962	Shridhar Patil	Indian National Congress
1967	Navnitrai Shah	Praja Socialist Party
1972	Vinayak Patil	Indian National Congress
1978	Arjun Shinghade	Janata Party
1980	Vishnu Valvi	Indian National Congress (I)
1985	Vishnu Valvi	Indian National Congress
1990	Avinash Sutar	Shiv Sena
1995	Manisha Nimkar	Shiv Sena
1999	Manisha Nimkar	Shiv Sena
2004	Manisha Nimkar	Shiv Sena
2009	Rajendra Gavit	Indian National Congress
2014	Krushna Ghoda	Shiv Sena
2016^	Amit Ghoda	Shiv Sena
2019	Shrinivas Vanga	Shiv Sena
2024	Rajendra Gavit	Shiv Sena

== Election results ==
=== Assembly Election 2024 ===
2024 Maharashtra Legislative Assembly election : Palghar
Party	Candidate	Votes	%	±%
SS	Rajendra Dhedya Gavit	112,894	53.77	▼1.88
SS(UBT)	Jayendra Kisan Dubla	72,557	34.56	New
MNS	Korda Naresh Lakshman	10,251	4.88	▼5.60
NOTA	None of the Above	4,634	2.21	▼3.63
Independent	Adv. Viraj Ramchandra Gadag	4,089	1.95	New
Independent	Vijaya Rajkumar Mhatre	3,494	1.66	New
Independent	Dandekar Manoj Bhalchandra	2,190	1.04	New
Lokrajya Party	Gopal Rajaram Koli	1,664	0.79	New
Margin of victory		40,337	19.21	▼13.75
Turnout		2,14,572	71.86	▲24.63
Total valid votes		2,09,938		
Registered electors		2,98,608		▲8.97
SS hold		Swing	▼1.88	

=== Assembly Election 2019 ===
2019 Maharashtra Legislative Assembly election : Palghar
Party	Candidate	Votes	%	±%
SS	Shrinivas Chintaman Vanga	68,040	55.65	▲13.27
INC	Yogesh Shankar Nam	27,735	22.69	▼7.74
MNS	Umesh Gopal Govari	12,819	10.49	New
VBA	Viraj Ramchandra Gadag	11,469	9.38	New
NOTA	None of the Above	7,135	5.84	▲3.84
BSP	Jadhav Suresh Ganesh	2,194	1.79	New
Margin of victory		40,305	32.97	▲21.00
Turnout		1,29,412	47.23	▼16.73
Total valid votes		1,22,257		
Registered electors		2,74,026		▲10.66
SS hold		Swing	▲13.27	

=== Assembly By-election 2016 ===
2016 Maharashtra Legislative Assembly by-election : Palghar
Party	Candidate	Votes	%	±%
SS	Amit Krushna Ghoda	67,129	42.39	▲13.75
INC	Rajendra Dhedya Gavit	48,181	30.42	▲2.11
BVA	Manisha Manohar Nimkar	36,781	23.22	▲8.49
CPI(M)	Vartha Chandrakant Barkya	4,865	3.07	▼0.01
NOTA	None of the Above	3,162	2.00	▲0.14
Margin of victory		18,948	11.96	▲11.64
Turnout		1,61,535	65.23	▼2.88
Total valid votes		1,58,373		
Registered electors		2,47,631		▲2.72
SS hold		Swing	▲13.75	

=== Assembly Election 2014 ===
2014 Maharashtra Legislative Assembly election : Palghar
Party	Candidate	Votes	%	±%
SS	Krushna Arjun Ghoda	46,142	28.64	▲2.58
INC	Rajendra Dhedya Gavit	45,627	28.32	▼13.48
BJP	Dr.Premchand Tulshiram Gond	34,149	21.19	New
BVA	Nimkar Manisha Manohar	23,738	14.73	New
CPI(M)	Vartha Chandrakant Barkya	4,973	3.09	▲0.33
MNS	Jagannath Kisan Vartha	3,148	1.95	New
NOTA	None of the Above	2,987	1.85	New
BSP	Ashok Govind Shingada	1,907	1.18	▲0.02
Margin of victory		515	0.32	▼15.43
Turnout		1,64,189	68.11	▲10.41
Total valid votes		1,61,129		
Registered electors		2,41,079		▲2.16
SS gain from INC		Swing	▼13.16	

=== Assembly Election 2009 ===
2009 Maharashtra Legislative Assembly election : Palghar
Party	Candidate	Votes	%	±%
INC	Rajendra Dhedya Gavit	55,665	41.80	▲1.25
SS	Manisha Manohar Nimkar	34,694	26.05	▼21.32
Independent	Nam Shankar Sakharam	30,683	23.04	New
Independent	Varkhande Rama Lalya	4,560	3.42	New
CPI(M)	Sutar Gangaram Dhakat	3,677	2.76	New
BSP	Lahange Sunil Balu	1,549	1.16	▼2.37
Independent	Makan Lallu Dhodi	1,174	0.88	New
Margin of victory		20,971	15.75	▲8.93
Turnout		1,33,165	56.43	▼1.84
Total valid votes		1,33,165		
Registered electors		2,35,982		▲11.09
INC gain from SS		Swing	▼5.57	

=== Assembly Election 2004 ===
2004 Maharashtra Legislative Assembly election : Palghar
Party	Candidate	Votes	%	±%
SS	Manisha Manohar Nimkar	58,627	47.37	▼8.17
INC	Rajendra Dhedya Gavit	50,186	40.55	▲22.26
BSP	Avinash Baliram Sutar	4,377	3.54	New
Independent	Vishnu Laxman Kadav	2,480	2.00	New
ABS	Sumada Prakash Bhaurao	1,976	1.60	New
Margin of victory		8,441	6.82	▼22.56
Turnout		1,23,766	58.27	▲16.12
Total valid votes		1,23,764		
Registered electors		2,12,415		▲8.06
SS hold		Swing	▼8.17	

=== Assembly Election 1999 ===
1999 Maharashtra Legislative Assembly election : Palghar
Party	Candidate	Votes	%	±%
SS	Manisha Manohar Nimkar	46,015	55.54	▲9.47
JD(S)	Pagi Geeta Gajanan	21,673	26.16	New
INC	Adv. Shelar Janardan Bhiva	15,155	18.29	▼11.02
Margin of victory		24,342	29.38	▲12.63
Turnout		91,857	46.73	▼24.05
Total valid votes		82,843		
Registered electors		1,96,571		▲8.22
SS hold		Swing	▲9.47	

=== Assembly Election 1995 ===
1995 Maharashtra Legislative Assembly election : Palghar
Party	Candidate	Votes	%	±%
SS	Manisha Manohar Nimkar	55,399	46.08	▲6.87
INC	Rahane Jagannath Shidu	35,250	29.32	▼0.65
JD	Dhodade Kaluram Kakadya	27,749	23.08	▼7.75
Independent	Gadag Ramesh Harichandra	1,036	0.86	New
BSP	Gadag Suresh Harichandra	802	0.67	New
Margin of victory		20,149	16.76	▲8.39
Turnout		1,24,296	68.43	▲8.82
Total valid votes		1,20,236		
Registered electors		1,81,644		▲13.03
SS hold		Swing	▲6.87	

=== Assembly Election 1990 ===
1990 Maharashtra Legislative Assembly election : Palghar
Party	Candidate	Votes	%	±%
SS	Avinash Baliram Sutar	36,141	39.20	New
JD	Kaluram Kakadya Dhodade	28,424	30.83	New
INC	Rahane Jagannath Shidu	27,628	29.97	▼8.10
Margin of victory		7,717	8.37	▲3.66
Turnout		94,426	58.76	▲9.90
Total valid votes		92,193		
Registered electors		1,60,698		▲29.08
SS gain from INC		Swing	▲1.14	

=== Assembly Election 1985 ===
1985 Maharashtra Legislative Assembly election : Palghar
Party	Candidate	Votes	%	±%
INC	Valvi Vishnu Gopal	22,495	38.06	New
JP	Arjun Kakadya Shingade	19,713	33.36	▼12.09
Independent	Avinash Baliram Sutar	14,942	25.28	New
Independent	Janardan Bhiva Shelar	1,829	3.09	New
Margin of victory		2,782	4.71	▲1.37
Turnout		61,112	49.09	▲14.20
Total valid votes		59,097		
Registered electors		1,24,493		▲12.51
INC gain from INC(I)		Swing	▼10.71	

=== Assembly Election 1980 ===
1980 Maharashtra Legislative Assembly election : Palghar
Party	Candidate	Votes	%	±%
INC(I)	Valvi Vishnu Gopal	17,956	48.78	▲40.52
JP	Shingade Arjun Kakadya	16,729	45.45	▼12.80
BJP	Hirve Sakharam Undrya	1,993	5.41	New
Margin of victory		1,227	3.33	▼24.69
Turnout		37,723	34.09	▼22.34
Total valid votes		36,811		
Registered electors		1,10,648		▲9.81
INC(I) gain from JP		Swing	▼9.46	

=== Assembly Election 1978 ===
1978 Maharashtra Legislative Assembly election : Palghar
Party	Candidate	Votes	%	±%
JP	Arjun Kakadya Shingade	32,635	58.24	New
INC	Shelar Janardan Bhiwa	16,934	30.22	▼33.49
INC(I)	Valvi Vishnu Gopal	4,630	8.26	New
SS	Bharao Udarya Sumda	1,835	3.27	New
Margin of victory		15,701	28.02	▼1.75
Turnout		57,947	57.51	▼2.17
Total valid votes		56,034		
Registered electors		1,00,765		▲14.33
JP gain from INC		Swing	▼5.47	

=== Assembly Election 1972 ===
1972 Maharashtra Legislative Assembly election : Palghar
Party	Candidate	Votes	%	±%
INC	Vinayak Sitaram Patil	32,441	63.71	▲22.97
SSP	Moreshwar Bhimaji Mestri	17,285	33.95	New
INC(O)	Dhan Kushanlal N. Shruff	1,192	2.34	New
Margin of victory		15,156	29.77	▲16.15
Turnout		53,198	60.36	▼9.55
Total valid votes		50,918		
Registered electors		88,133		▲26.90
INC gain from PSP		Swing	▲9.36	

=== Assembly Election 1967 ===
1967 Maharashtra Legislative Assembly election : Palghar
Party	Candidate	Votes	%	±%
PSP	N. B. Shaha	25,417	54.35	▲19.43
INC	C. B. Vartak	19,052	40.74	▼2.89
CPI(M)	S. H. Wadhan	1,234	2.64	New
Independent	M. S. More	1,059	2.26	New
Margin of victory		6,365	13.61	▲4.90
Turnout		50,749	73.07	▲1.80
Total valid votes		46,762		
Registered electors		69,453		▼8.89
PSP gain from INC		Swing	▲10.72	

=== Assembly Election 1962 ===
1962 Maharashtra Legislative Assembly election : Palghar
Party	Candidate	Votes	%	±%
INC	Shridhar Sakharam Patil	21,796	43.63	▲1.56
PSP	Navanitrai Bhogilal Shah	17,447	34.93	▼23
Independent	Bamakaran Bachhu Dube	9,464	18.95	New
PWPI	Sulabha Bhalchandra Patil	1,244	2.49	New
Margin of victory		4,349	8.71	▼7.14
Turnout		54,321	71.26	▼11.89
Total valid votes		49,951		
Registered electors		76,232		▲37.40
INC gain from PSP		Swing	▼14.29	

=== Assembly Election 1957 ===
1957 Bombay State Legislative Assembly election : Palghar
Party	Candidate	Votes	%	±%
PSP	Shah Navnitrai Bhogilal	24,879	57.92	New
INC	Shroff Jayanti Chhotalal	18,072	42.08	New
Margin of victory		6,807	15.85	
Turnout		42,951	77.41	
Total valid votes		42,951		
Registered electors		55,483		
PSP win (new seat)				
