= Vikun Taak =

2020 film by Sameer Patil

- Theatrical release poster
- Directed by: Sameer Patil
- Written by: Siddheshwar Ekambe
- Produced by: Viva Inen; Uttung Hitendra Thakur
- Starring: Chunky Pandey; Shivraj Vaychal; Rohit Mane; Radha Sagar; Samir Choughule; Hrishikesh Joshi
- Cinematography: Suhas Gujrathi
- Edited by: Kiran Shirsagar
- Music by: Amitraj
- Production company: Viva Inen
- Distributed by: Rajshri Productions
- Release date: 14 February 2020
- Country: India
- Language: Marathi

Vikun Taak (transl. Sell It) is a 2020 Indian Marathi-language slapstick comedy-drama film directed by Sameer Patil and produced by Uttung Hitendra Thakur, under the banner of Viva Inen. The film stars Chunky Pandey, Shivraj Vaychal, Hrishikesh Joshi and Samir Choughule. The film was released on 14 February 2020.

== Premise ==
A mechanic from Dubai returns to India to get married. However, he faces a lot of problems when his wedding gets cancelled after the bank seizes his property because of a loan his father took.

== Cast ==
- Chunky Pandey as Abdul Lathif
- Shivraj Vaychal
- Radha Sagar as Dhani
- Rohit Mane
- Hrishikesh Joshi as Inspector Dongre
- Samir Choughule
- Varsha Dandale as Aai
- Aditi Yevale

== Music ==
The music of the film is composed by Amitraj.

== Release ==
The film was released on 14 February 2020.
