= Balak-Palak =

2013 Indian film by Ravi Jadhav

Balak Palak
- Theatrical release poster
- Directed by: Ravi Jadhav
- Screenplay by: Ravi Jadhav; Amber Hadap; Ganesh Pandit
- Story by: Amber Hadap; Ganesh Pandit
- Produced by: Riteish Deshmukh; Uttung Thakur
- Starring: Shashwati Pimplikar; Madan Deodhar; Bhagyashree Shankpal; Rohit Phalke; Prathamesh Parab; Sai Tamhankar; Kishor Kadam
- Cinematography: Mahesh Limaye
- Edited by: Jayant Jathar
- Music by: Vishal-Shekhar; Chinar - Mahesh
- Production company: Mumbai Film Company
- Release date: 4 January 2013
- Running time: 109 mins
- Country: India
- Language: Marathi
- Box office: ₹12 crore (US$1.2 million) (lifetime)

Balak-Palak (BP; transl. Children-Parents) is a 2013 Indian Marathi-language comedy drama film on the topic of sex education. The film was directed by Ravi Jadhav and produced by Riteish Deshmukh, Uttung Thakur, and Ravi Jadhav. This is the first film produced by actor Riteish Deshmukh. The story was written by Ganesh Pandit and Amber Hadap. Balak Palak was shot by Mahesh Limaye.

The initials "BP" formed by the title of the film also make a secondary reference to a blue picture or low-quality pornographic videos that were available on videotape in the 1980s in South Asia. The film deals with the topic of sex education of adolescents and is rated UA (Parental Guidance). With the positive reviews the film received, Deshmukh planned to make a Hindi remake of the film. This film was supposed to be remade into Tamil and Telugu by director Srikanth Velagaleti. The movie was the inspiration for Malayalam film Swarnamalsyangal, directed by quizmaster G. S. Pradeep. The film was released with English subtitles, which was done by Shivkumar Parthasarathy.

== Cast ==
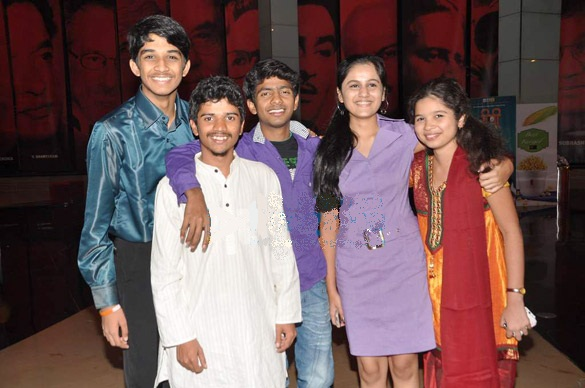
Film's star cast.

- Shashwati Pimplikar as Dolly Gavaskar
- Madan Deodhar as Bhagya/Bhagyesh Rege
- Bhagyashree Shankpal as Chiu/Aarti Puranik
- Rohit Phalke as Avya/Avinash Gandhe
- Prathamesh Parab as Vishu
- Kishor Kadam as Kadam Kaka
- Avinash Narkar as Vidyadhar Gandhe, Avinash's father
- Sai Tamhankar as Neha Sawant
- Vishakha Subhedar as Pednekar Kaku
- Supriya Pathare as Mrs. Puranik, Aarti's mother
- Anand Ingale as Pandharinath Rege, Bhagyesh's father
- Anand Abhyankar as Ashok Gavaskar, Dolly's father
- Madhavi Juvekar as Mrs. Gavaskar, Dolly's mother
- Subodh Bhave as older Avya
- Amruta Subhash as older Dolly
- Satish Tare as Ramesh
- Dhanashree Parab as Sampada

== Music ==
The songs of the film are composed by the duo Vishal–Shekhar. Known for their music compositions in Bollywood films, this is the first Marathi film venture of the duo.

The track "Harvali Pakhare" was remade in Hindi by the same team, with lyricist Manoj Muntashir filling in as a replacement for Guru Thakur, as the song "Kehkasha Tu Meri" in the 2016 film Akira.

| No. | Title | Lyrics | Singer(s) | Length |
|---|---|---|---|---|
| 1. | "Kalla" | Guru Thakur | Vishal Dadlani | 3:29 |
| 2. | "Haravali Pakhare" | Guru Thakur | Shekhar Ravjiani | 3:02 |
| 3. | "Susangati Sada Ghado" | Traditional | Sanika Indulkar, Isha Gaikwad, Veda Londhe, Rushikesh Pawar, Prathamesh Shinde | 2:56 |
| 4. | "Dhinchyak" | Instrumental | Chinar Kharkar | 3:02 |
| 5. | "Gale Lag Ja" | Ravi Jadhav | Chinar Kharkar; Chorus: Ravi Jadhav, Shivkumar Parthasarathy, Chinar Kharkar, Kedar Kadam, Rohan Agashe | 1:54 |
| 6. | "Jhoom" | Ravi Jadhav | Neha Rajpal | 1:25 |
| 7. | "Paisa" | Ambar Hadap | Chinar Kharkar | 1:11 |
| 8. | "BP Theme" | Instrumental | Chinar-Mahesh | 2:26 |
| 9. | "Neha Dream Theme" | Instrumental | Chinar-Mahesh | 1:17 |
| 10. | "Avya Love Theme" | Instrumental | Chinar-Mahesh | 3:23 |
| 11. | "Chiu Love Theme" | Instrumental | Chinar-Mahesh | 3:19 |
| 12. | "Zaakani Theme" | Instrumental | Chinar-Mahesh | 1:26 |

== Reception ==
The film was screened at the South Asian International Film Festival (SAIFF) in New York City in November 2012.

The newspaper Daily News and Analysis gave 3.5 stars out of 5 in their review and called it a "must watch for parents!" The newspaper Mint appreciated Jadhav for the direction of the film and keeping it on a UA-rated course despite the boldness of the subject".

== Feature ==
On 3 January 2013, Riteish Deshmukh announced they were planning a Hindi remake of Balak Palak.
