= Amit Ghoda =

Indian politician

Member of Legislative Assembly of Maharashtra
- In office February 2016 – October 2019
- Constituency: Palghar

Personal details
- Party: Nationalist Congress Party
- Other political affiliations: Shiv Sena
- Relations: Krushna Ghoda (father)

Amit Krushna Ghoda is an Indian politician and member of the 13th Maharashtra Legislative Assembly. He represented the Palghar Assembly Constituency as a member of Shiv Sena. He defeated ex minister Rajendra Gavit by a margin of 18,948 votes in the Palghar Assembly By-Election in February 2016.

== Positions held ==
- 2016: Elected to Maharashtra Legislative Assembly

== See also ==
- Palghar Lok Sabha constituency
