= Jivdani Mata =

Hindu goddess

Coordinates: 19°27′59.44″N 72°49′39.7″E

- God of Wealth of Life
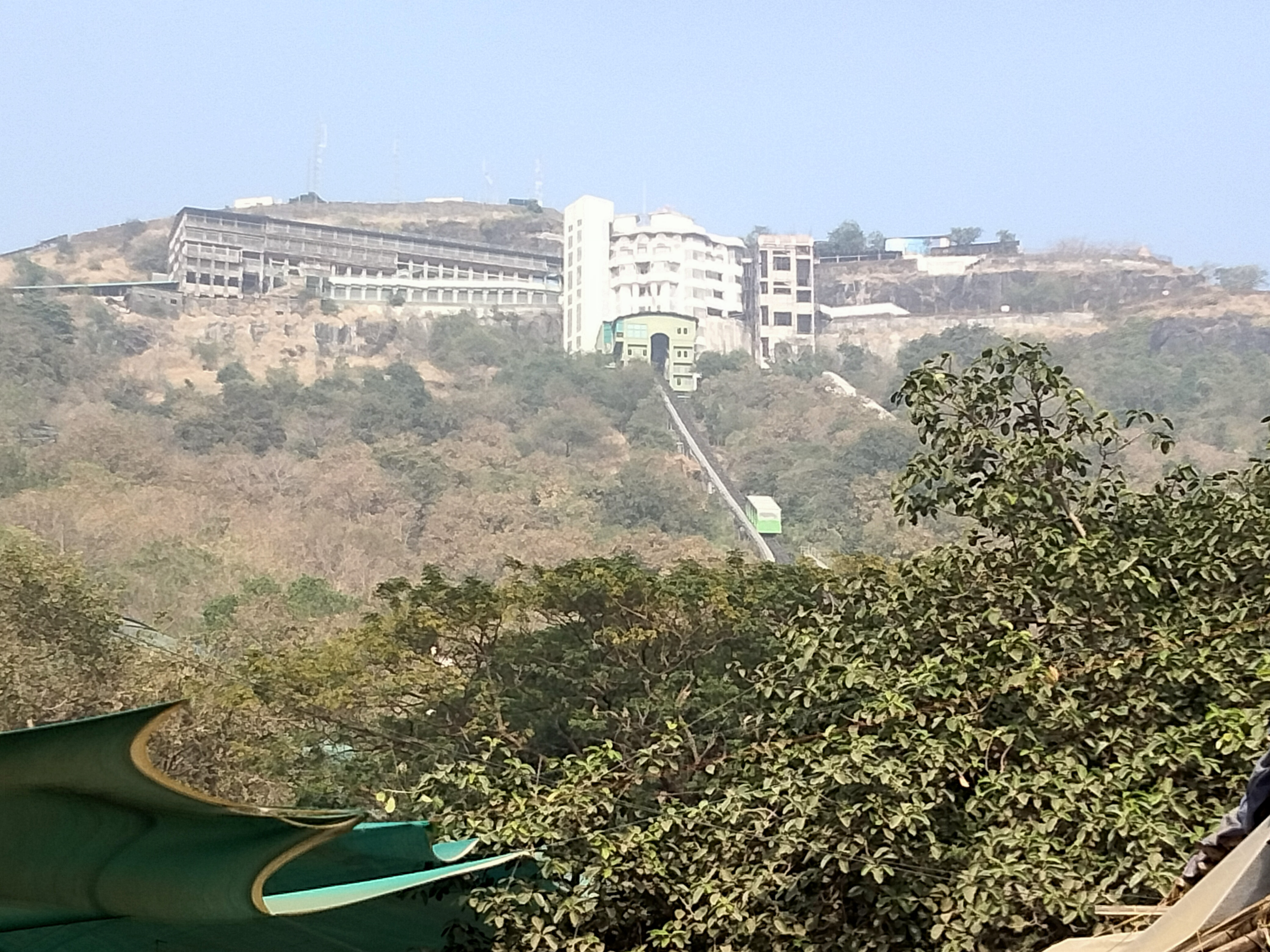
- Jivadani Mata Mandir on the top of the hill at Virar Suburban town of the Mumbai Metropolitan city
- Devanagari: जिवदानी माता
- Affiliation: Avatara of Mahadevi, Devi
- Weapon: Trident and lotus
- Region: Virar, Maharashtra, India

Jivdani Mata is a Hindu goddess whose main temple is atop a hill in Virar, Maharashtra, India.

== Location ==
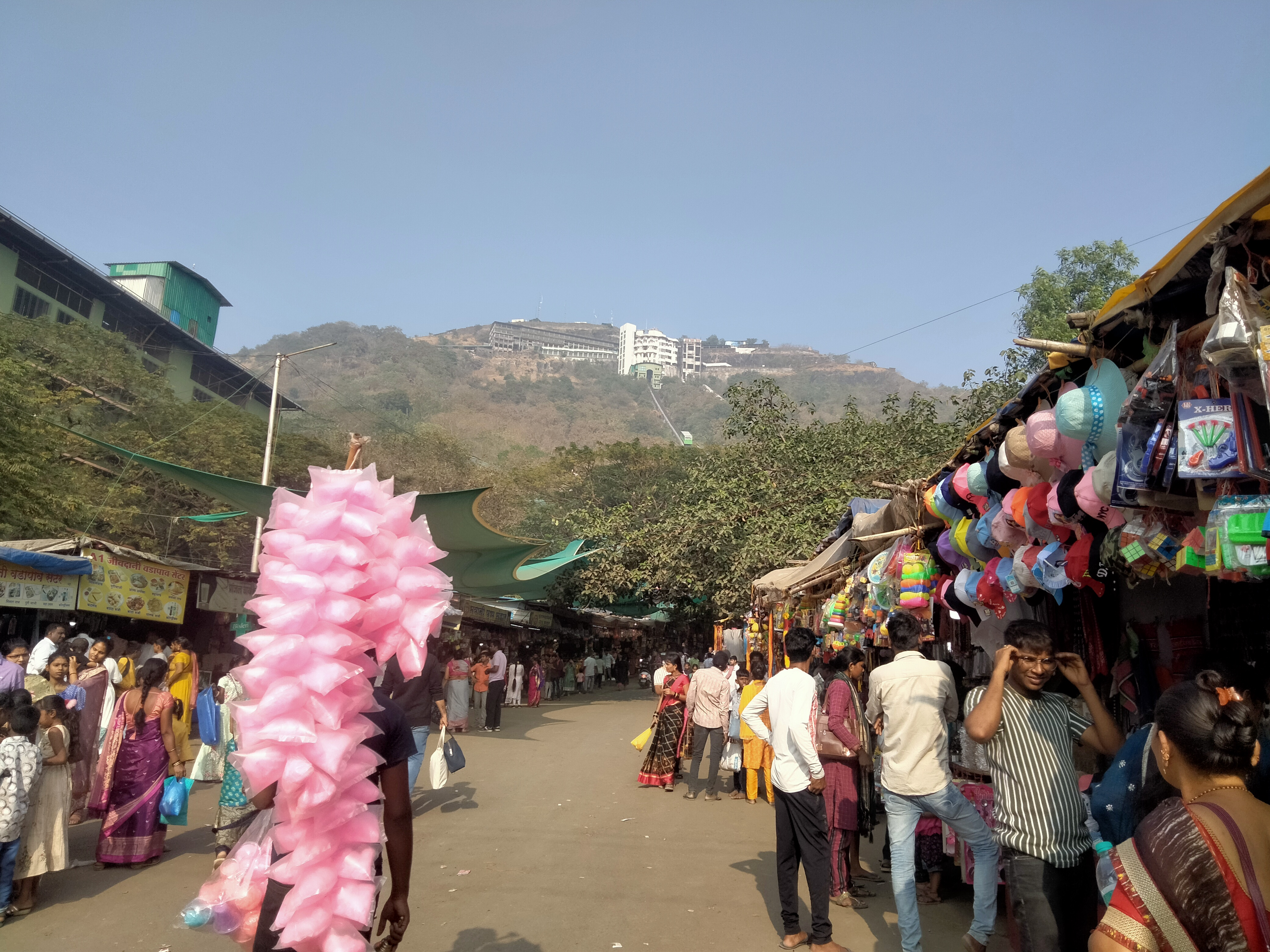
View of the Jivadani Mata Mandir from the bottom of the Hill on which the temple is situated at Virar

The temple is on the hill, almost 1500(*) ft from the sea-level. (*More reliable sources cite 728 ft) The Goddess rests in a temple situated about 1465 steps above the ground on a hill that forms a part of the Satpura Range in Virar, a northern Mumbai suburb, about 60 km away from Mumbai. The hill offers a very picturesque view of Virar and its vicinity. During the nine days of the Navratri festival many followers visit the shrine.

== History ==
The name Virar comes from Eka-viraa. Just as Tunga Parvat becomes "Tunga-ar", similarly "Vira" becomes "Vira-ar".There is a huge temple of Eka-vira Devi on the banks of Vaitarna River at the foot hills of Tunga Parvat where people used to conclude their "Shurpaaraka Yatra", as described in the Puranas and local legends. There is a huge tank here dedicated to Ekavira Devi called "Viraar Tirtha", i.e. "Eka-Viraa Tirtha". Even today, on the west banks of Viraar Tirtha, one finds a carved stone about three feet long and nine inches broad. Below that is a group of female figures of the Yoginis of Ekaveera Devi. Nearby one can find a stone with a roughly cut cow and calf (Savatsa Dhenu), a symbol of Govardhana Math which symbolizes eternity or Moksha.

Moving ahead near the foot of a knoll of rock are two cow’s feet (Go-Paad) roughly cut in rock. The legendary story of Jivdani Devi is as follows:

During their forest journey, Pandavas came to Shurparaka. They visited the holy temple of Vimaleshwar consecrated by Lord Parashuram and on their journey to Prabhas halted on the banks of Vaitarni river. There they worshipped the Bhagavati Ekaveera on the banks of Viraar Tirtha and seeing the serenity and lofty nature decided to carve caves in the nearby mountains. They did so on the hills nearby and installed and worshipped the Yoga Linga of Ekaveera devi in one of the caves. They called her 'Bhagavati Jeevadhani' (That is Goddess, who is the real wealth of life). While doing so, Pandavas also made a set of small caves now known as 'Pandav Dongri' about a mile from Shirgaon for the hermits. Many yogis used to stay in Pandav Dongri and have darshan of Jeevdhani Devi.

After the onset of Kali Yuga, and after the advent of the Buddhist faith, the number of Vaidik Yogis lessened and slowly people forgot the hillock and the devi. During times of Jagadguru Shankaracharya’s advent, a Mahar or Mirashi used to stay in Viraar who used to graze the village cattle. He came to Nirmal Mandir for the darshan of Jagadguru Shankaracharya Padmanabha Swami and requested that he bless him so that he could have darshan of his beloved Kuladevata. Jagadguru was pleased with the devotion of Mahar and advised him to serve Go-Mata on the foothills of Jivadhani, and at appropriate time he would have darshan of his Goddess and attain Go-Loka. He literally for the rest of life followed the advice of Jagadguru Shankaracharya and herded the village cattle. While grazing the village cattle, he used to see a cow grazing along with, whose owner never paid him for herding her. By his virtue, he determined to find the owner of the cow. He followed the cow on the top of Jeevdhan Hill. A beautiful woman with divine features appeared. The Mahar remembered the words of Jagadguru Shankaracharya and understood that she is none other than his Kuladevi Jeevdhani, he was overjoyed and asked "Oh Mother ! I have grazed your cow, will you not pay me for her herding ?". The Devi just smiled in delight and was on the point of putting some money in the Mahar’s hand, when he said "Do not touch me, I am Mahar. Give me something which cannot be spoilt by touch, words, smell, figure, and ether." Knowing this Devi asked "Lo my child, whence from you learned this unique knowledge of Varnashram Dharma and Moksha Dharma?". To this Mahar replied, "From none other than by the Grace of Jagadguru Shankaracharya". Bhagavati was pleased by this and said "By your virtue (Punya), see this cow which is none other than Kaamadhenu has taken your forefathers to higher abodes by her tail, crossing the Vaitarini". Thus saying the Mahar saw the cow leap from the hill top putting her two feet prints on hill floor and other two across Vaitarini River in heavens. Now Devi told, "I confer upon you the thing which you demanded that is Moksha."

Saying so the Mahar attained Moksha (The real Jeeva Dhana, the real wealth of Life) and the Devi was about to disappear in the cave, when a barren woman saw all this divine incident screamed "Devi Devi, Amba Amba, will you leave this barren daughter of yours without our jeevan dhan a child in my laps?". Devi was pleased by her prayers and said " Great indeed are you who saw all three of us. I henceforth bless you with a child." The lady was not satisfied by this, she said "Oh Mother of the three worlds, do not just bless me, but let all barren daughters of you who pray you be conferred with the child". Devi was pleased at this and said "See henceforth, due to the advent of Kali Yuga, in order to maintain purity of rituals, I will stay into a hole in the niche of the cave. The barren women who offer me the beetlenuts in this hole, as is offered in my original place in Mahurgad, will be rewarded with a progeny". Thus saying the Devi disappeared.

This lady spread out the incident and thus once again the Jeevdhan hill started to be visited by the pilgrims. The presently installed image is a very recent one, the original sanctum sanctorum is the hole in the niche of the cave, which is the central place of worship. A fair is held on the Dusherra day which is attended by thousands of people. The fort is visited by tourists frequently. The temple of the Devi is completely renovated and there is a beautiful idol of Devi in white marble. There is also a temple dedicated to Sri Krishna.
