= Dahanu Lok Sabha constituency =

Former constituency of the Indian parliament in Maharashtra

Coordinates: 20.0°N 72.8°E

Dahanu
- Former Lok Sabha constituency

Constituency details
- Country: India
- Region: Western India
- State: Maharashtra
- Abolished: 2009
- Reservation: ST

Dahanu was a Lok Sabha parliamentary constituency of Maharashtra. Niphad and Yevla Assembly segments were removed in 2008 and Igatpuri Assembly seat was added from the erstwhile Dahanu Lok Sabha Constituency. It is an Adivasi dominated constituency.

== Members of Lok Sabha ==
Year	Member	Party
1952-67 : Constituency did not exist
1967	Yashwantrao Martandrao Mukne	Indian National Congress
1971	Laxman Dumada	Indian National Congress
1977	Kom Shidava	Communist Party of India
1980	Damodar Shingada	Indian National Congress
1984	Damodar Shingada	Indian National Congress
1989	Damodar Shingada	Indian National Congress
1991	Damodar Shingada	Indian National Congress
1996	Chintaman Wanaga	Bharatiya Janata Party
1998	Shankar Sakharam	Indian National Congress
1999	Chintaman Wanaga	Bharatiya Janata Party
2004	Damodar Shingada	Indian National Congress
2009 onwards : See Palghar Lok Sabha constituency

== See also ==
- Dahanu
- Palghar Lok Sabha constituency
- Bhiwandi Lok Sabha constituency
- List of constituencies of the Lok Sabha
