= Tarabai Vartak =

Indian politician

Member of Legislative Assembly
- In office 1980−1985

Minister of State for Social Welfare
- In office 1980

Personal details
- Born: 19 August 1926 Bordi, Maharashtra, India
- Died: 29 May 2008 (aged 81) Virar, Maharashtra, India
- Party: Indian National Congress
- Spouse: Narsinh Vartak

Tarabai Narsinh Vartak (August 19, 1926−May 29, 2008) was an Indian politician from Maharashtra who served as a Minister of State for Social Welfare. She was also elected to the Maharashtra Legislative Assembly in 1980. Tarabai was the first woman to hold the Zila Parishad Chief position in India, who was elected as the President of Thane Zila Parishad in 1972. She was from the Indian National Congress.

She was responsible for establishing many educational institutions in the Vasai-Virar region. She was born in Bordi village of Thane district. Her father's name was Atmarampant Save and Matoshri Ramabai. In 1944, at the age of 18, she married Narasinh Vartak. She holds a B.A. from Women's University. She was a member of the State and Central Social Welfare Board.

On May 29, 2008, she died in Virar, a suburb in Mumbai's Thane district (now Palghar district).
