= Chintaman Vanaga =

Indian politician (1950–2018)

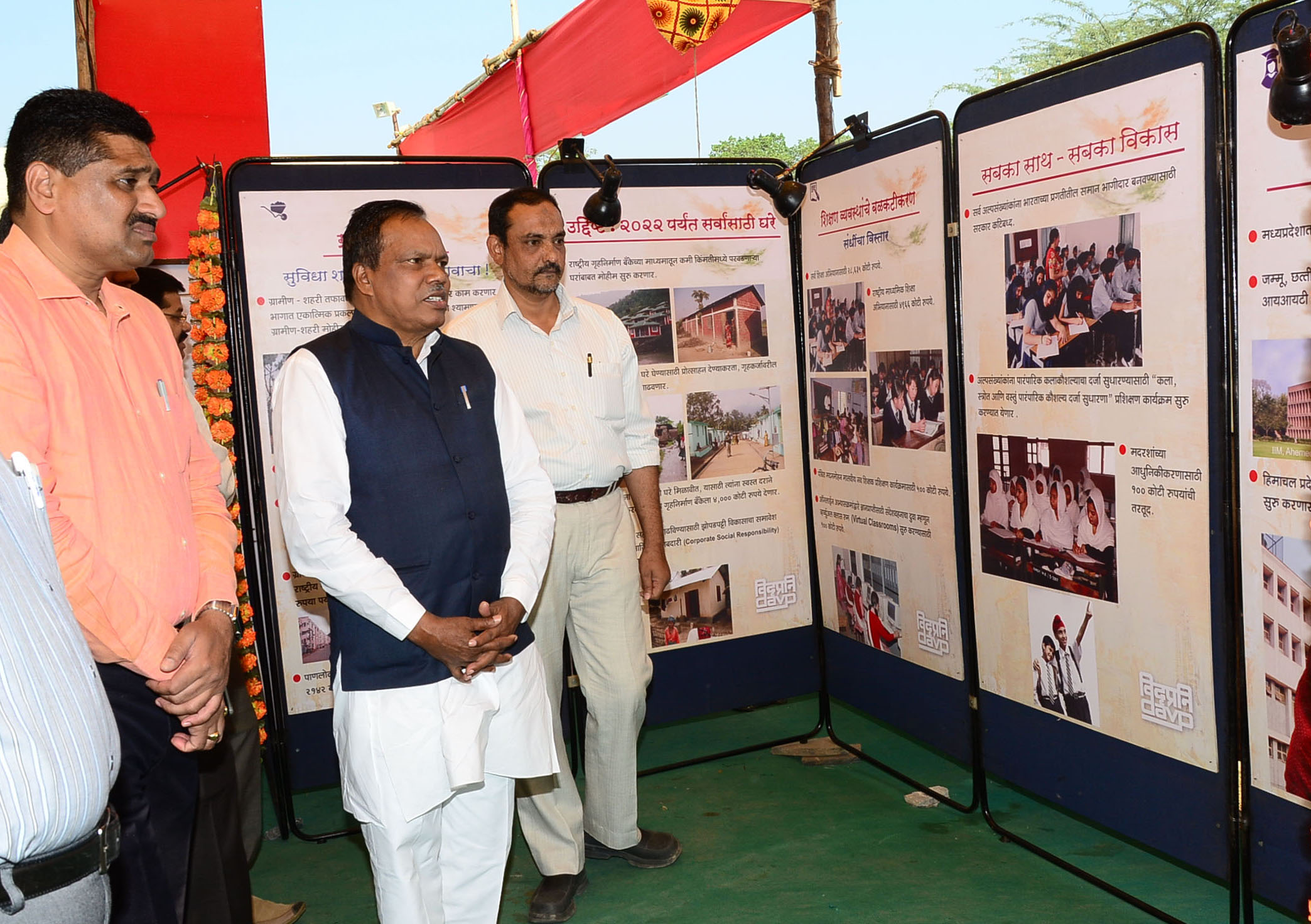
- Shri Chintaman Vanga visiting the DAVP exhibition at the inauguration of the Public Information Campaign

Member of Parliament, Lok Sabha
- In office 2014–2018
- Preceded by: Baliram Jadhav
- Succeeded by: Rajendra Gavit
- Constituency: Palghar
- In office 1999–2004
- Preceded by: Shankar Sakharam
- Succeeded by: Damodar Shingada
- Constituency: Dahanu
- In office 1996–1998
- Preceded by: Damodar Shingada
- Succeeded by: Shankar Sakharam
- Constituency: Dahanu

Member of Maharashtra Legislative Assembly
- In office 2009–2014
- Preceded by: Constituency created
- Succeeded by: Vishnu Savara
- Constituency: Vikramgad

Personal details
- Born: 1 June 1950; Kawada, Bombay State, India
- Died: 30 January 2018 (aged 67); New Delhi, India
- Political party: Bharatiya Janata Party
- Spouse: Jayashri
- Children: 2 sons, 2 daughters
- Parents: Navsha Wanaga (father); Bhikalibai (mother)
- Education: Bachelor of Arts, Bachelor in Law
- Alma mater: University of Mumbai
- Profession: Advocate, Politician

Chintaman Vanaga (1 June 1950 – 30 January 2018) was an Indian politician and Adivasi leader from Maharashtra and was a member of the Bharatiya Janata Party. He was member of 16th Lok Sabha elected from Palghar (Lok Sabha constituency) alongside being a two-time Member of Parliament (India) from Dahanu (Lok Sabha Constituency).

He was an advocate by qualification from University of Mumbai and served as the President of BJP's Thane district office from 1990 to 1996. He died on January 30, 2018, of a heart attack.

== State politics ==
In 2009, Vanaga became a member of Legislative Assembly of Maharashtra representing Vikramgad.

== National politics ==
Vanaga was elected to the 11th Lok Sabha in 1996 and 13th Lok Sabha in 1999 from the Dahanu. In the 2014 election he was elected to represent Palghar in the 16th Lok Sabha.

Lok Sabha
Preceded by Damodar Barku Shingada	Member of Parliament for Dahanu; 1996 – 1998	Succeeded by Shankar Sakharam
Preceded by Shankar Sakharam	Member of Parliament for Dahanu; 1999 – 2004	Succeeded by Damodar Barku Shingada
Preceded by Baliram Sukur Jadhav	Member of Parliament for Palghar; 2014 – 2018	Succeeded by Rajendra Gavit
