= Waliv =

- Census town
- Location in Maharashtra, India
- Coordinates: 19.4255°N 72.8613°E
- Country: India
- State: Maharashtra
- District: Thane

Population (2001)
  - Total: 15,312

Languages
  - Official: Marathi
- Time zone: UTC+5:30 (IST)

Waliv is a census town in Thane district in the Indian state of Maharashtra.

== Demographics ==
As of 2001 India census, Waliv had a population of 15,312. Males constitute 58% of the population and females 42%. Waliv has an average literacy rate of 70%, higher than the national average of 59.5%: male literacy is 77%, and female literacy is 60%. In Waliv, 16% of the population is under 6 years of age.
