= Rajesh Raghunath Patil =

Indian politician

MLA, 14th Legislative Assembly of Maharashtra
- In office October 2019 – November 2024
- Preceded by: Vilas Tare
- Succeeded by: Vilas Tare
- Constituency: Boisar

Personal details
- Born: 1975 (age 50–51) Palghar, Maharashtra
- Party: Bahujan Vikas Aaghadi
- Spouse: Rajshree Patil
- Children: Shivam Patil; Shaurya Patil
- Education: Vartak College (Mumbai University)
- Occupation: MLA
- Profession: Farming, construction business

Rajesh Raghunath Patil is an Indian politician in the Bahujan Vikas Aaghadi party. He was elected as a member of the Maharashtra Legislative Assembly from Boisar on 24 October 2019.

== Early life and education ==
Patil was born in 1975 in Vasai Taluka of Palghar district of Maharashtra to his father Raghunath Hiraji Patil. He married Rajshree Patil, they had two sons named Shivam and Shaurya Patil. In 1994, he got degree of SY B.comm. from Vartak College, Vasai (Mumbai University).

== Political career ==
Patil has been a member of the 14th Legislative Assembly of Maharashtra. Since 2019, he has represented the Boisar constituency and is a member of the Bahujan Vikas Aghadi.

In 2019 elections, he defeated his nearest rival Shiv Sena candidate or current MLA Vilas Tare by a margin of 2,752 votes.

== Posts held ==
#	From	To	Position	Comments
01	October 2019	November 2024	Member, 14th Legislative Assembly of Maharashtra	
