= Kupari =

Sub-group of the East Indian Christian community

Samvedi Christian community
Religions
- Roman Catholicism

Languages
- Samvedi Boli Bhasha, Maharashtri Konkani & Kadodi

Kupari (Portuguese: compadre) referring to the father of one's godchild; word derived from Kumpari and feminine being Kumari or Portuguese Comadre) or Samvedi Christians are a Roman Catholic Brahmin sub-group of the Bombay East Indian community. This community is concentrated mostly in Bassein (Vasai) (Portuguese: Baçaim), India, which is about 60 kilometres (37 mi) north of Mumbai (Bombay).

== See also ==
- Christian Kshatriyas
- Samvedi
- Konkani people
- Portuguese India
- Marathi people
