= Hitendra Thakur =

Indian politician (born 1961)

President, Bahujan Vikas Aghadi
- Incumbent
- Assumed office 2008
- Preceded by: Office established

Member of Maharashtra Legislative Assembly
- In office October 2014 – 23 November 2024
- Preceded by: Vivek Pandit
- Succeeded by: Sneha Pandit
- Constituency: Vasai
- In office March 1990 – October 2009
- Preceded by: Gonsalves Dominic John
- Succeeded by: Vivek Pandit
- Constituency: Vasai

Personal details
- Born: 3 October 1961 (age 65) Virar, Maharashtra, India
- Party: Bahujan Vikas Aghadi
- Other political affiliations: Indian National Congress (1990-1995)
- Spouse: Pravina Thakur
- Relations: Jayendra alias "Bhai" Thakur (Brother)
- Children: Kshitij Thakur, Uttung Thakur, Shikhar Thakur
- Education: Vartak college, Vasai
- Profession: Politician
- Website: http://hitendrathakur.com

Hitendra Vishnu Thakur (born 3 October 1961) is an Indian politician from Virar, Maharashtra, India. He is the president of Bahujan Vikas Aaghadi, political party in the Vasai-Virar region of Maharashtra, India. He was the Member of Legislative Assembly (MLA) for Vasai (Vidhan Sabha constituency) in Palghar district of Maharashtra. His family controls the Viva Group of Companies and Viva Trust which owns the Viva College located in Virar.

== Political life ==
Hitendra Thakur started his political career in 1988 when he was elected the Vasai Taluka Youth Congress president. Two years later, in the Maharashtra State Assembly elections in 1990, he was elected MLA for Vasai-Virar from the Indian National Congress at the age of 29. Later, he formed his political party named Vasai Vikas Mandal which was changed to Bahujan Vikas Aaghadi and won 3 subsequent elections as well.

His political party, Bahujan Vikas Aaghadi (BVA) currently holds the majority in the Vasai Virar Municipal Corporation (VVMC), Vasai Taluka Panchayat Samiti and various Gram Panchayats in the region. As such he helped Vasant Davkhare get the post of Deputy Chairman of the Maharashtra Legislative Council three times and Govinda (a Bollywood star and a close friend) win the Mumbai North seat in 2004 General elections. In 2024 general assembly election he lost to Sneha Pandit by a margin of 3275 votes.

== Personal life ==
Thakur was born on 3 October 1961 in Virar, district Palghar (formerly Thane district) in Maharashtra, India in a middle-class Hindu family hailing originally from Palghar. He did his schooling in Virar and later graduated from the Vartak College in Vasai. While studying in the Vartak College, Vasai, he was elected to the post of general secretary of the student council.

In mid-2009 his elder son, Kshitij Thakur won Nalasopara seat. His wife Pravina Thakur became the first female Mayor of Vasai-Virar after his party swept the Vasai Virar Municipal Corporation polls by winning 106 seats.

== Controversies ==
On 3 July 2009, the Government of Maharashtra issued a notification for the inclusion of 53 villages in the newly formed Vasai-Virar Municipal Corporation. However, 49 of the 53 villages had opposed the merger citing environmental and heritage issues and refused the move by forming the Gao Bachao Andolan Samiti under the guidance of Vivek Pandit, longtime opposition candidate of Hitendra Thakur. Thakur had allegedly influenced the police to arrest and assault Vivek Pandit for the same.

== Criminal cases and financial assets ==
His candidate affidavits filed as a candidate in the 2014 Maharashtra Legislative Assembly election, show that Thakur has 8 criminal cases against him (7 where charges are framed, 1 where cognizance is taken, 0 where convicted). He and his spouse have assets of over ₹100 crore (US$10 million), and liabilities of over ₹18 crore (US$1.9 million).

As of October 2014, Hitendra Thakur has over ₹19 crore (US$2.0 million) of movable assets, over ₹71 crore (US$7.4 million) of immovable assets, and over ₹12 crore (US$1.2 million) of liabilities. His wife has over ₹3 crore (US$310,000) of movable assets, over ₹4 crore (US$420,000) immovable assets, and over ₹6 crore (US$620,000) of liabilities.
