= Rajendra Gavit =

Indian politician

Member of Parliament, Lok Sabha
- In office 2018–2024
- Preceded by: Chintaman Vanaga
- Succeeded by: Hemant Savara
- Constituency: Palghar

Minister of State Government of Maharashtra
- In office 19 November 2010 – 28 September 2014
- Chief Minister: Prithviraj Chavan
- Department: Tribal Development; Labour; Horticulture

Personal details
- Born: 24 July 1967 (age 58) Nandurbar district, Maharashtra, India
- Party: Shiv Sena
- Other political affiliations: Bharatiya Janata Party (2018–19); Indian National Congress (2000–18)
- Spouse: Usha Gavit (m. 1989)
- Children: Rohit Gavit
- Parents: Dhedya Eashrya Gavit (father); Jaytabai Gavit (mother)
- Education: Bachelor of Arts
- Alma mater: Mumbai University

Rajendra Dhedya Gavit is an Indian politician and Shiv Sena politician. He is member of the 17th Lok Sabha (2019–2024) from Palghar. He was the tribal development minister in the Congress-NCP alliance government. In 2018 he joined BJP just before the by-poll to Palghar Lok Sabha seat, and won the election. In 2019, he joined BJP's alliance partner Shiv Sena as a tactical decision to contest from Palghar again.

== Philanthropy ==
He declared a donation of Rs 50 lakh for the upcoming rehabilitation and health centre of the Vithu Mauli Trust for the sake of the malnourished children.

== Positions held ==
- 2018 : Elected to 16th Lok Sabha, by-poll for Palghar
- 2019 : Elected to 17th Lok Sabha, again from Palghar

== Business ==
- He owns and runs an LPG Gas Agency named "Dev Mogra Gas Service" in Mira Road, Mira-Bhayandar, Thane
