= Bahujan Vikas Aaghadi =

Indian Political Party in Maharashtra

Bahujan Vikas Aghadi
- Abbreviation: BVA
- President: Hitendra Thakur
- Secretary: Baliram Sukur Jadhav
- Founder: Hitendra Thakur
- Founded: 2009
- Preceded by: Vasai Vikas Aghadi
- Headquarters: Virar
- Ideology: Minority Rights
- ECI Status: State party
- Alliance: NDA (2014-2019; 2022-2024); MY (2022-2024); UPA (2009-2014; 2019-2022); MVA (2020-2022)
- Seats in Maharashtra Legislative Assembly: 0 / 288

Election symbol
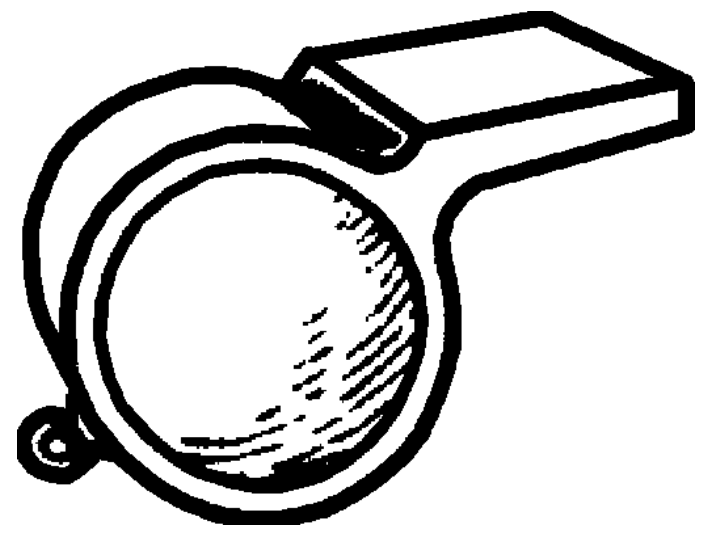

Website
- Bahujan Vikas Aghadi

Bahujan Vikas Aaghadi (English: Bahujan Development Front) is a regional political party in the Vasai-Virar region of Maharashtra. It was originally known as Vasai Vikas Aaghadi. The party is led and founded by Hitendra Thakur who was a one-time member of the Maharashtra Legislative Assembly on an Indian National Congress ticket and two-time independent MLA before founding the party.

Baliram Sukur Jadhav of the BVA, backed by Hitendra Thakur, was elected to the 15th Lok Sabha in 2009 and declared unconditional support to the UPA government. Kshitij Thakur, MLA from Nalasopara, Rajeev Patil, the first mayor of Vasai-Virar City Municipal Corporation are some of the well known local leaders associated with the party.

== Career ==
In 2009, in the 15th Lok Sabha election, Bahujan Vikas Aaghadi won the Palghar seat and Baliram Jadhav became the first member of parliament from the party.

Aaghadi lost the 16th Lok Sabha election to BJP's Chintaman Vanga.

In 2009 Maharashtra Legislative Assembly election, Bahujan Vikas Aaghadi bagged two seats: Boisar where Vilas Tare and Nalasopara where Kshitij Thakur won the elections.

In the 2014 Maharashtra Legislative Assembly election, Bahujan Vikas Aaghadi increased its tally to 3 seats, holding Boisar and Nalasopara and adding Vasai where Hitendra Thakur won.

== Vasai Virar Municipal Corporation ==
In 2015, The BVA swept the Vasai Virar Municipal Corporation polls by winning 106 seats. Vasai elected its first woman Mayor, Pravina Thakur for Bahujan Vikas Aaghadi. Pravina Thakur is married to Hitendra Thakur, MLA from Vasai.

Many of the winners faced no opposition candidate. The BVA is one of the strongest parties in Vasai-Virar region.

== 2019 Assembly election ==
In the 2019 Assembly Elections, Bahujan Vikas Aghadi won all three of the seats it contested. The newly elected MLA's were Rajesh Raghunath Patil, Kshitij Thakur, and Hitendra Thakur.

| Constituency Number | Constituency Name | Winner |
|---|---|---|
| 131 | Boisar | Rajesh Raghunath Patil |
| 132 | Nalasopara | Kshitij Thakur |
| 133 | Vasai | Hitendra Thakur |

== 2024 Assembly election ==
In the 2024 Assembly Elections, Bahujan Vikas Aghadi lost all six seats it contested.
