= Hemant Savara =

Indian politician

Hemant Vishnu Savara is an Indian politician. He is a member of Bhartiya Janata Party. He has been elected to Lok Sabha from Palghar Lok Sabha constituency. Savara is the son of late state BJP minister for tribal development Vishnu Savara. He graduated from Mumbai University's Grant Medical College with a Bachelor of Surgery and Bachelor of Medicine degree.
