= Sex education in India =

Sex education is a controversial subject in India, sometimes viewed as a taboo topic; across the country and within the community, opinions on how or whether to deliver it are divided. The states of Gujarat, Maharashtra, Madhya Pradesh and Chhattisgarh have banned or refused to implement sex education in schools. The BJP government in Madhya Pradesh said sex education had "no place in Indian culture" and plans to introduce yoga in schools instead. On the global level, India has notably fallen behind numerous countries, including underdeveloped and significantly smaller countries such as Sudan and the Congo Republic, where sex education is first taught at the primary level.

== Current state of sexual health ==
=== Sex and pregnancy ===
The sex ratio in India is skewed towards males, with 943 girls born per 1000 males in 2011. This is propagated by several factors, including lower caloric intake by mothers, female infanticide, and cultural preference for boys. However, the most plausible explanation for fewer female than male births is prenatal sex determination, followed by induced abortion of female fetuses. This suggests that potential mothers are socialised to believe that having a female child is detrimental to their family, either economically or socially.

In more developed parts of India, such as tier 1 and tier 2 cities, an increasing number of young men and women are delaying marriage to pursue their careers, a result of rising education levels. However, most Indian households are conservative and prohibit discussions about sex. In rural areas and urban slums, girls are often married early, entering married life unequipped with any knowledge of sex. This manifests itself on a larger scale. According to UNICEF, about 240 million women alive in India today were married before the age of 18 even though the average age of women at first marriage has increased to 20.6.

While pre-marital sex is severely stigmatised in India, child marriages and teen pregnancies remain a growing concern for the country, with 11.5% being married between the ages of 15 and 19, and 45% being married before the age of 24. Girls entering into such early marriages are encouraged by family and community to reproduce directly after marriage; they tend to have low awareness of, and lack access to, contraception. Approximately one-third of these girls have a child before the age of 19. Medical termination of pregnancy is available to few and the attitude of the providers towards such women is generally unsympathetic. As a result, girls and young women with unwanted pregnancies may attempt unsafe abortions or abandon the child. Such stigmatised women may also commit suicide.

There is a low rate of contraception use within or outside of marriage. Based on a National Family Health Survey conducted in 1992–1993, 7.1% of married women (aged 15–19) use contraception, compared to 21% among women (aged 20–24). Additionally, adolescents lack access to contraceptive methods like oral contraceptives and diaphragms. Lack of contraception use is coupled with lack of availability of safe abortions. While five million abortions occur annually in India, only 10% of those are performed within the structures of a high-quality hospital.

=== HIV/AIDS and other STIs ===
Approximately 2.1 million people are said to be infected with HIV among India's estimated population of 1.3 billion. Though a huge burden to the lower-middle-income country, its prevalence has seen a decline from the epidemic's peak in the early 2000s and now ranks third among countries with the largest HIV epidemic. Among those infected, individuals belonging to stigmatized groups such as sex workers, men who have sex with other men, transsexuals, truck drivers and drug users are seemingly most vulnerable. These groups are also reported to be vulnerable to four other sexually transmitted infections (STIs) that are prevalent in India as well. Although their prevalence varies dramatically across the country, the following STIs have been a growing concern: syphilis, gonorrhea, chlamydia, and trichomoniasis.

Premarital sex has risen in India, and a large proportion of it is unprotected. A high incidence of risky sexual behaviors is found among India's youth in addition to poor awareness of sexually transmitted infections. These findings can explain why 31% of India's HIV cases are among individuals between the ages of 15 – 29 years old. Growing concerns over high incidence of STIs among the youth only further emphasizes the current lack of and need for comprehensive sex education in India.

== Types of sex education ==
=== For adolescents ===
There are about 190 million adolescents in India – a demographic in which over 30% of people are illiterate. Disparities in gender at this age can often be explained by relatively poor access to reproductive health care and the fact that girls often have less access to food, which adversely affects their growth patterns. Additionally, adolescent girls often work long hours in the home with no opportunity for employment.

Adolescents, both males and females, tend to not be informed about sexuality. This is often caused by lack of education in general (but sex education in particular) and conservative attitudes towards sex. Those few schools who do provide sex education to its students, establish different curriculums for girls and boys and are taught separately. However, this curriculum is far from being comprehensive and of adequate quality. The use of the words "sex and sexuality" are often omitted in these teachings and topics are often restricted to menstrual hygiene and equivalent. The perpetuation of stigma surrounding sex and sex education in India is only further exacerbated by these schools, which often encourage girls to keep quiet about the topics in their sex education curriculum from their male peers and instructors because it is 'inappropriate'. The level of awareness and knowledge regarding sex education among adolescents is also higher among those living in urban areas than among those living in rural areas. This is caused by higher-quality education and more exposure to globalized points of view.

A lack of a comprehensive sex education may also contribute to the high incidence of sexual violence in India. While values vary across states, lifetime prevalence for women of physical or sexual violence of 89% in some regions (that is, in those regions, 89 per cent of women have experienced this violence at some point in their lives). This finding reflects the contributions of the resistance in Indian society to openly discuss and educate individuals on topics such as consent, sexual violence, and healthy sexuality.

==== Role of Technology ====
The lack of access to quality sex education in India has left the youth responsible for educating themselves on the topic. With its continuous advancements and accessibility, technology has become an integral part in filling in those gaps and educating India's youth about sex. Studies show adolescents are gathering a majority of this information from social media, pornography, television and streaming platforms. However, its accessibility and wide range of information has also raised concerns. Specifically, their lack of knowledge of the topic makes India's youth vulnerable to misinformation about sex. Another concern that has risen is the role that pornography has in promoting misogynistic behavior and sexual violence.

==== Efficacy ====
Parents are often reluctant to teach accurate and relevant information about sex to adolescents because of the stigma associated with the topic. More than taboo, mothers especially feel like talking about sex is embarrassing and dirty.

This same attitude is held by teachers. First, when the National Council of Educational Research and Training initiated sex education, they structured it as a part of existing studies, rather than a separate subject. However, teachers tried to avoid teaching the topic. Second, a school in Gujarat implemented a system where students could anonymously drop letters into a box for trained counselors to read. The nature of these questions tended to split by sex. Girls' questions tended to focus on menstruation, physical appearance, and 'normal' sexual behavior while boys' questions tended to focus on nocturnal emission, masturbation and body size. Though these programmes exist, they are unable to reach girls who are not in school, a significant section of the population. Other than the specific initiatives outlined above, there are very few services that cater specifically to adolescents. Though NGOs and local schools are trying to push for more, teachers rarely cover issues like sexuality and reproductive health. Additionally, NGO reach is limited even though they can reach out-of-school adolescents.

In a 2005 study in Chandigarh, a reproductive health education package was prepared after consulting parents and teachers to address cultural sensitivities. The package had a guidebook for the instructor and a book for the students for self-study. The students (aged 15–20; mean age 16.47 years) were grouped and subjected to two types of education methods. In the first method, education was directly provided to them in a classroom setting by an instructor. In the second method, some students were selected and educated by instructors. Following that, they were encouraged to engage in peer education. A third group was reserved as a control. The first group showed the most improvement in their knowledge after the nine-month programme. The peer-education group showed knowledge levels similar to the first group after a three-month course. The increase in knowledge level was considered significant after comparison to the control group.

Surveys have shown that adolescents learn a significant amount about sex from the media, including books and movies. Research has found that such exposure is not, however, equivalent to accuracy. Even though teens interacted with media that talked about sex, they did not glean accurate information regarding the reproductive process. Additionally, exposure to media did not teach adolescents about healthy emotional growth or responsible adulthood.

However, despite continuing opposition, large scale interventions have seen success and demonstrate the possibilities of implementing sex education programs in India. In Jharkhand, India, a sex education program called Udaan has seen success not only as a curriculum, but at responding to resistance. Established in 2006 by the government of Jharkhand, this program has not only been sustained over time, but has been extended to all government secondary and upper primary schools The curriculum itself is designed to address adolescents' sexual and reproductive health needs and was a government response to the recognition and growing concerns over HIV and lack of school-based sex education. Its recognition by national and state governments as a model program is not only credited to the curriculum itself, but the program's success at responding to resistance and creating a supportive environment. Key features that have allowed such results is the programs's transparency and efforts in involving the community. In addition, the government-led implementation of the program, which involves careful monitoring and evaluation, has undeniably contributed to the program's sustainability and expansion over the years. Various agencies that have evaluated the impacts of the program record positive effects on the students' knowledge regarding topics covered in the curriculum and improvements in critical skills such as communication and decision-making.

==== Opposition ====
There has been significant opposition to sex education, specifically for adolescents. In 2007, when sex education curriculum was promoted by India's Ministry of Human Resource Development, controversy developed. Many opponents believed that sex education would corrupt youth and be anathema to traditional Indian values. Additionally, they believed it would lead to promiscuity and irresponsible behavior. Finally, they argued that sex education was a western construct that was being forced upon India. These arguments cause states like Gujarat, Madhya Pradesh, Maharashtra, Karnataka, Rajasthan, Chhattisgarh and Goa to ban sex education programming.

In March 2007, the Maharashtra state government banned sex education in schools. The ban came after the ruling and opposition Members of the Legislative Assembly claimed that western countries had forced the Central government to implement the program. In April 2007 Basavaraj Horatti, the Karnataka Minister for Primary and Secondary Education, said that the program has been put on hold after complaints from teachers. The teachers had complained that the books were oriented towards increasing the sales of condoms and that they were sexually provocative. A women's organisation, Akhila Bharatha Mahila Samskruthika Sanghatane, also protested the course in the state.

On May 15, 2007, the chief minister of Madhya Pradesh Shivraj Singh Chouhan removed sex education from the state curriculum on the grounds that it offended Indian values, acting on the advice of Rashtriya Swayamsevak Sangh (RSS) ideologue Dinanath Batra. Batra suggested that yoga be added to the curriculum instead. This view was criticised by S. Anandhi, a scholar of gender issues, who wrote that sex-education was vital for combatting child sexual abuse and the spread of HIV/AIDS. Later that year, Batra wrote a letter on behalf of the Shiksha Bachao Andolan Samiti, which stated that teachers who followed the sex-education curriculum could be jailed for two years on the charge of "outraging the modesty of a woman."

In May 2007, Rajasthan Chief Minister Vasundhara Raje wrote a letter to Arjun Singh, the Union Minister of Human Resource Development. In the letter, she stated that children in Class IX and XI did not require sex education because they were in the early stages of puberty. The state Education Minister Ghansyam Tiwari stated that they already had a life skills course called Jeevan Shaili which was sufficient.

In June 2009, Orissa Education Minister Bishnu Charan Das stated that they were delaying introduction of sex education by a year as a result of protests by teachers' organisations and students' political groups.

In July 2009, a teachers' association protested the introduction of sex education in Uttar Pradesh. Om Prakash Sharma, the chief of the association, said that it would result in embarrassing questions from students. He threatened to burn the books on a bonfire if they were not withdrawn.

Ram Madhav of Rashtriya Swayamsevak Sangh (RSS) called sex education unfit for Indian society. He instead proposed that workshops be held for adults only to warn them against a promiscuous lifestyle. Prakash Javadekar of the Bharatiya Janata Party (BJP) proposed that sex education should consist of abstinence-only education. Another BJP leader Murli Manohar Joshi stated that the course would disturb the mental development of children and claimed that multinational companies were behind this to boost the sales of condoms.

In 2020, the Ministry of Human Resource Development and Health and Family Welfare once again developed and attempted to implement an adolescent education program to address the need for school-based sex education. However, even with the complete omission of the words "sexuality or sex" in the program, this initiative was met with resistance from various segments of public society.

Opponents of sex education for adolescents are swayed if sex education is deemed to be culturally sensitive and in line with Indian values. This can be achieved if the government and NGOs work in tandem to create curriculum that is acceptable to schools and the community. This trend may change as years progress because adolescents tend to have a more liberal view towards sex than adults.

Update required for this article

=== Family planning for adults ===
Family planning in India has had a varied history. During India's Emergency period in the 1970s, the government implemented a population-control policy which targeted lower-caste individuals. Because the United States used food aid as leverage, India was incentivised to create a program that would influence lower-caste individuals to not have children. This program was eventually disbanded because of the lack of hygiene associated with the procedures and the nearly coercive techniques that were used.

India's family planning programmes are mainly run by the government in conjunction with NGOs. Because these programs are often quota-based, they take two forms: sterilisation programmes and contraceptive programmes. Both use an incentive-based approach, where families are often given kitchen items or cash to undergo procedures.

==== Efficacy ====
The efficacy of India's family planning programs is dependent on the paradigm that is being used. Programs like Accredited Social Health Activist (ASHA) encourage women to register pregnancies and visit local health centres, and also encourage family planning through sterilisation. ASHA also holds information meetings and raise awareness on such issues as women's health, disease, social determinants of health, nutrition and sanitation. Additionally, they serve as counsellors on adolescent and female sexual and reproductive health. Past hospital care, ASHA also gives out free birth control pills and condoms which remove the stigma associated with couples buying contraceptives at drug stores.

==== Opposition ====
Significant criticisms of India's family planning program are from those who advocate that it should be education-based rather than quota-based. They argue that India's program is not sustainable because it does not stop women from marrying early or from spacing their pregnancies. Critics state that India's program does not consider the psyche of women who often undergo irreversible procedures like sterilisation without providing the infrastructure for regular follow-ups. Finally, critics state that the programme is inherently gendered because most sterilisations are performed on women even though the procedure is less invasive for men.

=== HIV/AIDS and STD prevention education ===
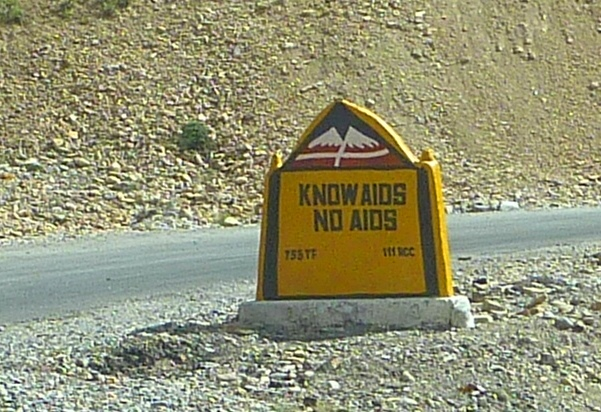
HIV/AIDS prevention sign

Because HIV/AIDS has been deemed a health crisis in India, prevention techniques have been set as a priority by the government which have been pushing NGOs to implement programming that focuses on training, support, and outreach. HIV/AIDS prevention education in India has been focused on educational materials like newspapers and pamphlets as well as conversations with educated professionals.

==== Efficacy ====
In a study conducted in Tamil Nadu, 29% of women and 58% of men attending an outpatient clinic were aware of AIDS/STDs, however only 12% of women and 26% of men attending an STD clinic were aware of AIDS. The conclusion from this study was that mass media had been more effective at disseminating information about HIV/AIDS than the radio. However, this study also showed that mothers were not knowledgeable about Mother-to-Infant transmission because the information had not filtered down to them.

Additionally, a 2008 survey conducted among 11 and 12 class girls (aged 14 to 19; mean age was 16.38) in South Delhi found that 71% had no knowledge about the effects of genital herpes. 43% did not know the effects of syphilis and 28% did not know gonorrhoea was an STD. 46% thought the all STDs, except AIDS, could be cured. The major sources of information about STDs and safe sex among the girls were their friends (76%), media (72%), books and magazines (65%) or the internet (52%). 48% felt that they could not talk to their parents about sex.

==== Opposition ====
Opposition to HIV/AIDS prevention education in India has been scarce because of the recognition of the importance of stopping this disease. However, there has been a hesitance to acknowledge and interact with men who have sex with men (MSM). This has decreased the efficacy of programming because of the stigma associated with this population.

== Advocacy organisations and movements ==
The Family Planning Association of India (FPAI) was established in 1949. It was formed with the aim to safeguard the health of women by preventing too many and too closely spaced pregnancies. In 1952, it established its first clinic where it provide advice to family planning, infertility, and family counseling.

The Society for Nutrition, Education & Health Action (SNEHA) was established in the 1990s and is located in Mumbai, India. From children's health all the way to sexual assault prevention, it works to promote awareness of women's autonomy, health, and sexuality.

Talking About Reproductive and Sexual Health Issues (TARSHI) was established in 1996 and is located in New Delhi, India. TARSHI works to expand sexual and reproductive choices by operating from an affirmative and rights based perspective - a perspective that is often antithetical to common cultural beliefs.

Nirantar Trust promotes gender equality, especially for girls from marginalised communities, and was started in 1993. By considering factors like caste, sexuality, religion, class, and ethnicity, Nirantar works to develop feminist leadership.

The Sonagachi Project is a peer education project which was started in 1992. It encourages sex-workers in West Bengal to insist on condoms. The project has successfully increased condom usage and reduced STD levels among sex-workers in West Bengal.

On September 25, 2018, Prime Minister Narendra Modi launched the Ayushman Bharat Yojana program- a national program focused on making holistic improvements in India's health care systems by unifying India's various health systems into one program. Under the Ayushman Bharat, the Modi government has stated they are striving for the achievement of Sustainable Development Goals 2030 and see youth as a key demographic to achieve this.

In a white-paper released in April 2018, the Ministry of Health & Family Welfare and Ministry of Human Resource & Development, Government of India released sexual education guidelines in schools. This landmark paper represented the first cohesive efforts by India's federal government to address this issue. This initiative has been highly controversial: An RSS-affiliated organization stated that "there is no need for teaching sex education in schools or making it a part of curriculum. If required, counselling can be provided for a student in schools".

Specific guidelines in the Ayushman Bharat have promoted a program of selected teachers as health and wellness ambassadors: "Teachers with good communication skills, and ability to connect with students should be selected. The teachers from science, physical education background may be given preference. The age of teachers selected as Health and Wellness Ambassadors should be preferably below 45 years." These individuals are selected to carry out a specialised curriculum and be a resource for students in improving sexual and reproductive health, preventive substance misuse and preventing injuries and violence, amongst other health related outcomes. To measure impact, a data collection and analysis initiative has been set up and will annually collect data regarding the percentage of students receiving information regarding sexual and reproductive health.

== See also ==
- National AIDS Control Organisation
- Family Planning Association of India
- OMG 2, a movie dealing with Sex education in India
