= Nallasopara Assembly constituency =

Constituency of the Maharashtra legislative assembly in India

Coordinates: 19.422°N 72.820°E

Nallasopara
- Constituency No. 132 for the Maharashtra Legislative Assembly

Constituency details
- Country: India
- Region: Western India
- State: Maharashtra
- District: Palghar
- Lok Sabha constituency: Palghar
- Established: 2008
- Total electors: 608,609
- Reservation: None

Member of Legislative Assembly
- 15th Maharashtra Legislative Assembly
- Incumbent Rajan Naik
- Party: BJP
- Elected year: 2024

Nalasopara Assembly constituency is one of the 288 Vidhan Sabha (legislative assembly) constituencies of Maharashtra state, western India. This constituency is located in Palghar district.

== Geographical scope ==
The constituency comprises parts of Vasai taluka viz. revenue circles Virar and Vasai-Virar Municipal Corporation.

== Members of the Legislative Assembly ==
Year	Member	Party
Until 2008: Constituency did not exist
2009	Kshitij Thakur	Bahujan Vikas Aghadi
2014	Kshitij Thakur	Bahujan Vikas Aghadi
2019	Kshitij Thakur	Bahujan Vikas Aghadi
2024	Rajan Naik	Bharatiya Janata Party

== Election results ==
=== Assembly Election 2024 ===
2024 Maharashtra Legislative Assembly election : Nallasopara
Party	Candidate	Votes	%	±%
BJP	Rajan Balkrishna Naik	165,113	47.58%	New
BVA	Kshitij Hitendra Thakur	128,238	36.96%	▼19.42
MNS	Vinod Shankar More	16,949	4.88%	New
INC	Sandeep Amarnath Pandey	16,355	4.71%	New
PHJSP	Dhananjay Vithal Gawade	14,561	4.20%	New
NOTA	None of the Above	3,137	0.90%	▼0.31
VBA	Adv. Suchit Suresh Gaikwad	2,246	0.65%	▼0.66
Margin of victory		36,875	10.63%	▼5.82
Turnout		350,142	57.53%	▲5.81
Total valid votes		347,005		
Registered electors		608,609		▲17.23
BJP gain from BVA		Swing	▼8.79	

=== Assembly Election 2019 ===
2019 Maharashtra Legislative Assembly election : Nallasopara
Party	Candidate	Votes	%	±%
BVA	Kshitij Hitendra Thakur	149,868	56.37%	▲5.66
SS	Pradeep Rameshwar Sharma	106,139	39.92%	▲21.92
VBA	Pravin Prakash Gaikwad	3,487	1.31%	New
NOTA	None of the Above	3,221	1.21%	▲0.36
Margin of victory		43,729	16.45%	▼7.89
Turnout		269,070	51.83%	▼5.30
Total valid votes		265,849		
Registered electors		519,160		▲31.02
BVA hold		Swing	▲5.66	

=== Assembly Election 2014 ===
2014 Maharashtra Legislative Assembly election : Nallasopara
Party	Candidate	Votes	%	±%
BVA	Kshitij Hitendra Thakur	113,566	50.72%	▼2.13
BJP	Rajan Balkrishna Naik	59,067	26.38%	New
SS	Chavhan Shirish Jayram	40,321	18.01%	▼10.70
INC	Ashok Vinayak Pendhari	4,555	2.03%	New
MNS	Mandavkar Vijay Sonu	3,860	1.72%	▼10.56
NOTA	None of the Above	1,898	0.85%	New
Margin of victory		54,499	24.34%	▲0.20
Turnout		225,866	57.00%	▲8.45
Total valid votes		223,922		
Registered electors		396,240		▲12.71
BVA hold		Swing	▼2.13	

=== Assembly Election 2009 ===
2009 Maharashtra Legislative Assembly election : Nallasopara
Party	Candidate	Votes	%	±%
BVA	Kshitij Hitendra Thakur	89,284	52.84%	New
SS	Chavhan Shirish Jayram	48,502	28.71%	New
MNS	Vivek Atmaram Keluskar	20,749	12.28%	New
RPI(A)	Dhule Ishwar Balu	4,795	2.84%	New
Independent	Virpalsingh R Kashyap	1,791	1.06%	New
BSP	Khairnar Santosh Sukhdeo	1,446	0.86%	New
Independent	Bait Narendra Harishchandra	1,091	0.65%	New
Margin of victory		40,782	24.14%	
Turnout		168,973	48.06%	
Total valid votes		168,960		
Registered electors		351,555		
BVA win (new seat)				
