= Damodar Barku Shingada =

Indian politician (1954–2021)

Shingada Damodar Barku

Member of the India Parliament for Dahanu
- Constituency: Dahanu

Personal details
- Born: 1 October 1954 Dahanu, Palghar district, Maharashtra
- Died: 2 May 2021 (aged 66)
- Party: INC

Shingada Damodar Barku (1 October 1954 – 2 May 2021) was an Indian politician.

He served as a member of the Lok Sabha from 2004 to 2009 and 1980 till 1996, representing the Dahanu constituency of Maharashtra state. He was a member of the Indian National Congress (INC) political party.

Shingada died on 2 May 2021, at the age of 67, due to COVID-19 during the COVID-19 pandemic in India.
