= Boisar Assembly constituency =

Constituency of the Maharashtra legislative assembly in India

Coordinates: 19.80°N 72.75°E

Boisar
- Constituency No. 131 for the Maharashtra Legislative Assembly

Constituency details
- Country: India
- Region: Western India
- State: Maharashtra
- District: Palghar
- Established: 2008
- Total electors: 411,373
- Reservation: ST

Member of Legislative Assembly
- 15th Maharashtra Legislative Assembly
- Incumbent Vilas Tare
- Party: SHS
- Alliance: NDA

Boisar Assembly constituency is one of the 288 Vidhan Sabha (legislative assembly) constituencies of Maharashtra state, western India. This constituency is located in Palghar district. Vilas Tare is the current legislator of this constituency.

== Geographical scope ==
The constituency comprises parts of Palghar taluka viz. revenue circles Saphala, Boisar and Manor, parts of Vasai Taluka viz. revenue circles Mandvi, Waliv (CT), and Gokhiware (CT).

== Members of the Legislative Assembly ==
Year	Member	Party
Until 2008: Constituency did not exist
2009	Vilas Tare	Bahujan Vikas Aghadi
2014	Vilas Tare	Bahujan Vikas Aghadi
2019	Rajesh Patil	Bahujan Vikas Aghadi
2024	Vilas Tare	Shiv Sena

== Election results ==
=== Assembly Election 2024 ===
2024 Maharashtra Legislative Assembly election : Boisar
Party	Candidate	Votes	%	±%
SS	Vilas Tare	126,117	45.93%	▲9.46
BVA	Rajesh Raghunath Patil	81,662	29.74%	▼8.05
SS(UBT)	Dr. Vishwas Valvi	50,571	18.42%	New
MNS	Bhutkade Shailesh Dashrath	7,049	2.57%	▼4.53
Independent	Naresh Prakash Dhodi	6,144	2.24%	New
NOTA	None of the Above	3,613	1.32%	▼0.90
BSP	Ajinath Balu Bhavar	3,029	1.10%	▲0.21
Margin of victory		44,455	16.19%	▲14.87
Turnout		2,78,185	67.62%	▲0.73
Total valid votes		2,74,572		
Registered electors		4,11,373		▲30.41
SS gain from BVA		Swing	▲8.14	

=== Assembly Election 2019 ===
2019 Maharashtra Legislative Assembly election : Boisar
Party	Candidate	Votes	%	±%
BVA	Rajesh Raghunath Patil	78,703	37.80%	▼0.59
SS	Vilas Tare	75,951	36.47%	▲5.74
Independent	Janathe Santosh Shivram	30,952	14.86%	New
MNS	Dinkar Dattatrey Wadhan	14,780	7.10%	▲4.42
NOTA	None of the Above	4,622	2.22%	▲0.36
VBA	Prof. Rajesingh Manga Koli	2,882	1.38%	New
Sangharsh Sena	Rupesh Ramachandra Dhangada	1,986	0.95%	New
BSP	Sunil Dasharath Guhe	1,857	0.89%	New
Margin of victory		2,752	1.32%	▼6.33
Turnout		2,13,254	67.61%	▼0.60
Total valid votes		2,08,230		
Registered electors		3,15,434		▲24.97
BVA hold		Swing	▼0.59	

=== Assembly Election 2014 ===
2014 Maharashtra Legislative Assembly election : Boisar
Party	Candidate	Votes	%	±%
BVA	Vilas Tare	64,550	38.39%	▼0.56
SS	Kamalakar Anya Dalavi	51,677	30.73%	▲1.26
BJP	Dhodi Jagdish Bhagwan	30,228	17.98%	New
Independent	Sunil Pandurang Dhanava	5,702	3.39%	New
MNS	Vasant Raghu Ravate	4,503	2.68%	▼10.45
INC	Bhupendra Lalit Madhavi	4,005	2.38%	New
CPI(M)	Vanga Heena Harichandra	3,639	2.16%	New
NOTA	None of the Above	3,126	1.86%	New
Margin of victory		12,873	7.66%	▼1.83
Turnout		1,71,278	67.86%	▲9.98
Total valid votes		1,68,145		
Registered electors		2,52,411		▲3.64
BVA hold		Swing	▼0.56	

=== Assembly Election 2009 ===
2009 Maharashtra Legislative Assembly election : Boisar
Party	Candidate	Votes	%	±%
BVA	Vilas Tare	53,727	38.95%	New
SS	Dhanva Sunil Pandugrang	40,649	29.47%	New
MNS	Avinash Baliram Sutar	18,104	13.12%	New
JD(S)	Dhodhade Kaluram Kakdya	7,360	5.34%	New
Independent	Narayan Gopal Savara	3,556	2.58%	New
Independent	Sudheer Shankar Nam	3,361	2.44%	New
Independent	Vartha Haribhau Soma	2,515	1.82%	New
Margin of victory		13,078	9.48%	
Turnout		1,37,940	56.64%	
Total valid votes		1,37,939		
Registered electors		2,43,557		
BVA win (new seat)				
