= Vasai (disambiguation) =

Vasai is an Indian city. It may also refer to:

- Vasai-Virar
- Fort Vasai
- Battle of Vasai
- Vasai Road railway station
- Vasai-Virar City Municipal Corporation
- Vasai Assembly constituency
- Vaṣai S-vaṣonĭ
- Vasai Road–Roha line
- Diocese of Vasai
- Vasai Creek
- Vasai Creek Railway Bridge
- Vasai Road–Diva DEMU
- Adrian Văsâi
- Vasai taluka
- Vasai-Virar Municipal Swimming Pool Complex
- Panvel–Vasai Road MEMU
- Vasai-Virar Municipal Corporation Marathon
