= Vasai-Virar Municipal Swimming Pool Complex =

Swimming complex in Vasai-Virar, India

- Address: Vasai-Virar

Construction
- Opened: 2013

The Vasai-Virar Municipal Swimming Pool Complex is a swimming complex in Vasai-Virar, India. The pool is host to the many aquatics events. The stadium is owned by the Vasai-Virar City Municipal Corporation. The pool was opened in 2013 with qualified trainers and lifeguards. It is the first sporting venue in the area.

== Facilities ==
- One competition pool
- One diving pool
- One warm-up pool
