= Gokhivare =

- Census town
- Location in Maharashtra, India
- Coordinates: 19.4125°N 72.8445°E
- Country: India
- State: Maharashtra
- District: Palghar
- Founder: ki

Population (2001)
  - Total: 19,772

Languages
  - Official: Marathi
- Time zone: UTC+5:30 (IST)
- Vehicle registration: MH48

Gokhivare is a census town in Vasai-Virar taluka of Palghar district in the Indian state of Maharashtra. Until recently when Palghar district was formed on 1 August 2014, Gokhivare came under the original Thane district. Gokhivare is governed by Vasai-Virar Municipal Corporation.

== Demographics ==
As of 2001 India census, Gokhivare had a population of 19,772. Males constitute 57% of the population and females 43%. Gokhivare has an average literacy rate of 64%, higher than the national average of 59.5%: male literacy is 73%, and female literacy is 53%. In Gokhivare, 17% of the population is under 6 years of age.
