= Nallasopara =

Nalasopara ( Shurparak Nagar )
- City
- Shurparak Nagar
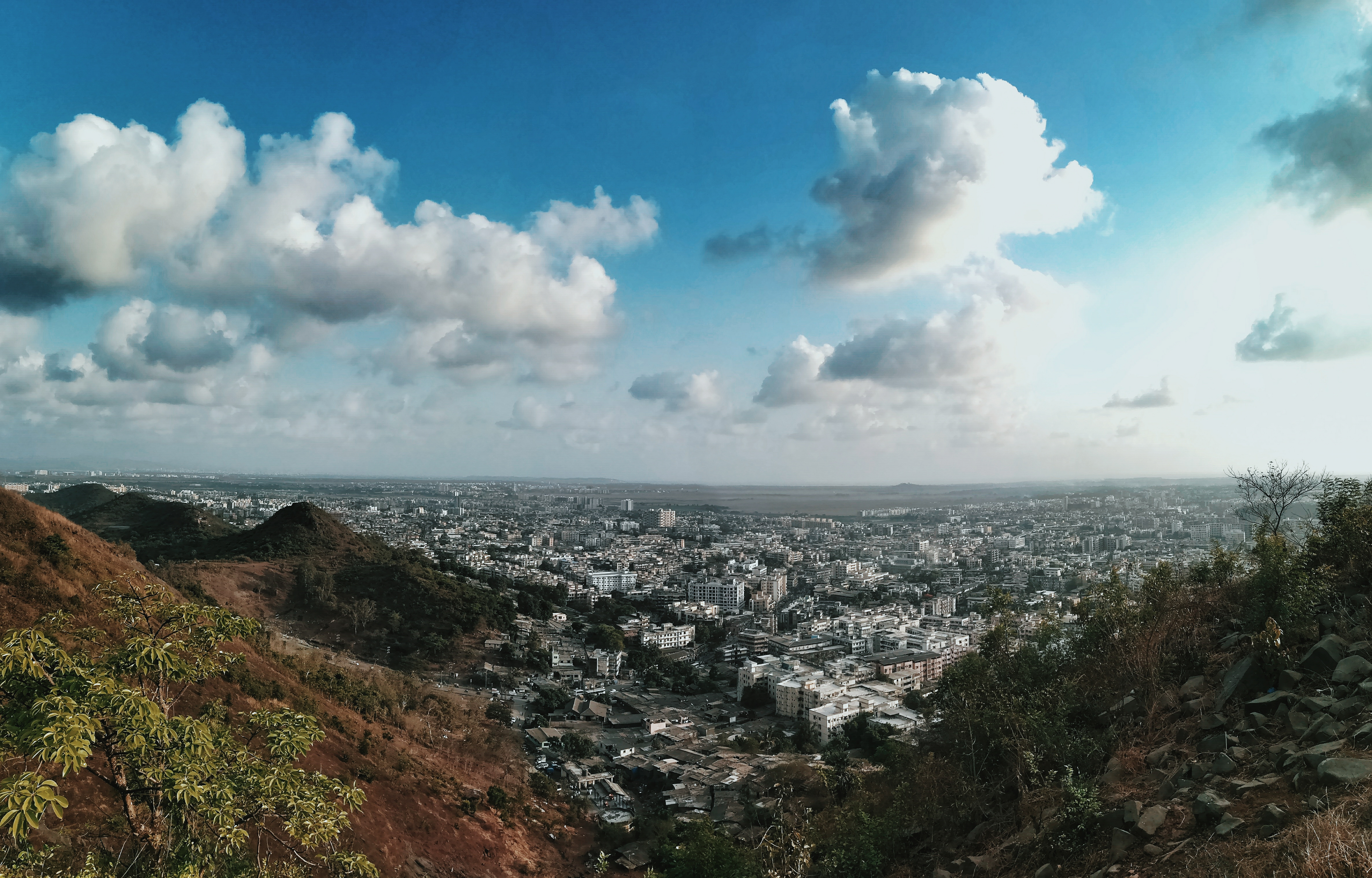
- Hilltop panorama of the city from 2017
- Nickname: Nala Sopara
- Location within Maharashtra Location within India
- Coordinates: 19.4154°N 72.8613°E
- Country: India
- State: Maharashtra
- District: Palghar
- City: Vasai-Virar

Government
  - Type: Municipal Corporation
  - Body: Vasai-Virar Municipal Corporation

Population (2001)
  - Total: 184,664

Languages
  - Official: Marathi
- Time zone: UTC+5:30 (IST)
- PIN: East: 401 209; West: 401 203
- Telephone code: 0250
- Vehicle registration: MH48
- Vidhan Sabha constituency: Nallasopara

Nalasopara or Nala-Sopara and officially Shurparak Nagar (pronunciation: [naːla sopaɾa]), formerly known as Sopara or Supara, is a city in the Palghar district of Maharashtra, India, and is governed by the Vasai-Virar Municipal Corporation (VVMC). The city lies within the Mumbai Metropolitan Region.

== Climate ==
It has tropical climate, specifically a tropical wet and dry climate (Aw) under the Köppen climate classification, with seven months of dryness and peak of rains in July.

This moderate climate consists of high rainfall days and very few days of extreme temperatures. The cooler season from December to February is followed by the summer season from March to June. The period from June to about the end of September constitutes the south-west monsoon season, and October and November form the post-monsoon season. The driest days are in winter while the wettest days occur in July.

Between June and September, the south-west monsoon rains lash the region. Pre-monsoon showers are received in May. Occasionally, monsoon showers occur in October and November. The average total annual rainfall averages between 2,000 and 2,500 mm (79 and 98 in). Annually, over 80% of the total rainfall is experienced during June to October. Average humidity is 61-86%, making it a humid climate zone.

The temperature varies from 22 to 36 °C (72 to 97 °F). The average temperature is 26.6 °C (79.9 °F), and the average precipitation is 2,434 mm (95.8 in). The average minimum temperature is 22.5 °C (72.5 °F). The daily mean maximum temperature range from 28.4 to 33.4 °C (83.1 to 92.1 °F), while the daily mean minimum temperature ranges from 17.5 to 26.4 °C (63.5 to 79.5 °F). In winter, temperature ranges between 12 and 25 °C (54 and 77 °F) while summer temperature ranges from 36 to 41 °C (97 to 106 °F)

Climate data for Nala sopara
Month	Jan	Feb	Mar	Apr	May	Jun	Jul	Aug	Sep	Oct	Nov	Dec	Year
Mean daily maximum °C (°F)	28.5 (83.3)	29 (84)	31 (88)	32.5 (90.5)	33.2 (91.8)	32 (90)	29.7 (85.5)	29.5 (85.1)	29.8 (85.6)	32.1 (89.8)	32 (90)	30.3 (86.5)	30.8 (87.5)
Daily mean °C (°F)	23.2 (73.8)	23.7 (74.7)	26.3 (79.3)	28.3 (82.9)	29.8 (85.6)	29 (84)	27.4 (81.3)	27.1 (80.8)	27 (81)	27.8 (82.0)	26.6 (79.9)	24.6 (76.3)	26.7 (80.1)
Mean daily minimum °C (°F)	17.9 (64.2)	18.5 (65.3)	21.6 (70.9)	24.2 (75.6)	26.5 (79.7)	26.1 (79.0)	25.1 (77.2)	24.7 (76.5)	24.3 (75.7)	23.6 (74.5)	21.2 (70.2)	18.9 (66.0)	22.7 (72.9)
Average precipitation mm (inches)	0 (0)	1 (0.0)	1 (0.0)	0 (0)	10 (0.4)	486 (19.1)	870 (34.3)	531 (20.9)	350 (13.8)	71 (2.8)	6 (0.2)	1 (0.0)	2,327 (91.5)
Source: Climate-Data.org (altitude: 5m)

=== Sopara ===
Sopara (by some identified with the Ophir mentioned in the Hebrew texts (Note: 1 Kings 9:28; 10:11; 22:49; 1 Chronicles 29:4; 2 Chronicles 8:18; Job 22:24; 28:16; Psalms 45:9; Isaiah 13:12)) was an ancient port town and the capital of the ancient Aparanta. The ancient port of Sopara was the most important port in western India after the celebrated port of Cambay. The site of this ancient town is located near the present-day Nala Sopara. In ancient times, it was the largest township on India's west coast, trading with Mesopotamia, Egypt, Cochin, Arabia and Eastern Africa.

The Mahabharata and the Puranas state that the Śūrpāraka was reclaimed from the sea for the dwelling place of Parashurama and it became a tirtha for this reason. The finding of the relics in a stupa and the rock edicts (the fragments of the 8th and 9th major rock edicts) of Ashoka in 1882 prove the importance of this port town from the 3rd century BCE to the 9th century CE. The Pali text Mahavamsa (VI, 46,47) states that the first king of the Sinhalese kingdom (now Sri Lanka), Vijaya sailed from Supparaka (Sopara) to Sri Lanka. Ptolemy mentioned this town as Soupara, and it was a major commercial centre during his time According to the Jaina writers, Shripala, a mythical king married Tilakasundari, daughter of king Mahasena of Soparaka. Jinaprabhasuri (14th century) in his Vividhatirthakalpa mentioned Soparaka as one of 84 Jaina tirthas (sacred places). He also mentioned an image of Rishabhadeva located in this city till his time.

The earliest reference occurs in Mahabharata as Shuparak. The Buddhist Suppara Jataka, believed to be of the 6th century BC, talks of Sopara as a prosperous port trading with ports of Southwest Asia, Gujarat, Malabar and Sri Lanka, its experts (navigation pilots- bodhisattvas), and the seas that they voyaged across. From about the third or fourth century BC precise historic data can be pieced together.

== Excavations at Sopara ==
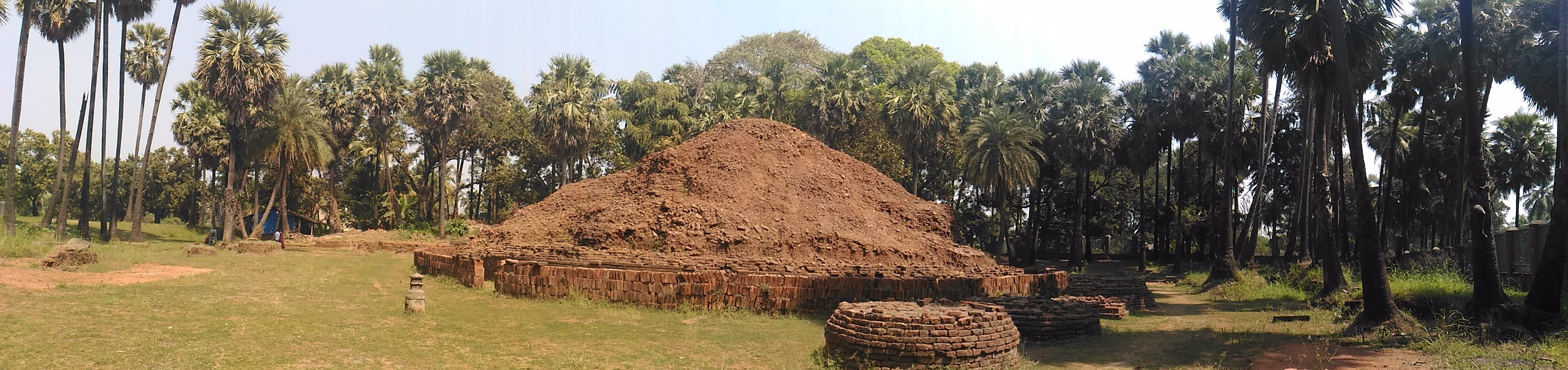
The stupa of Nala Sopara

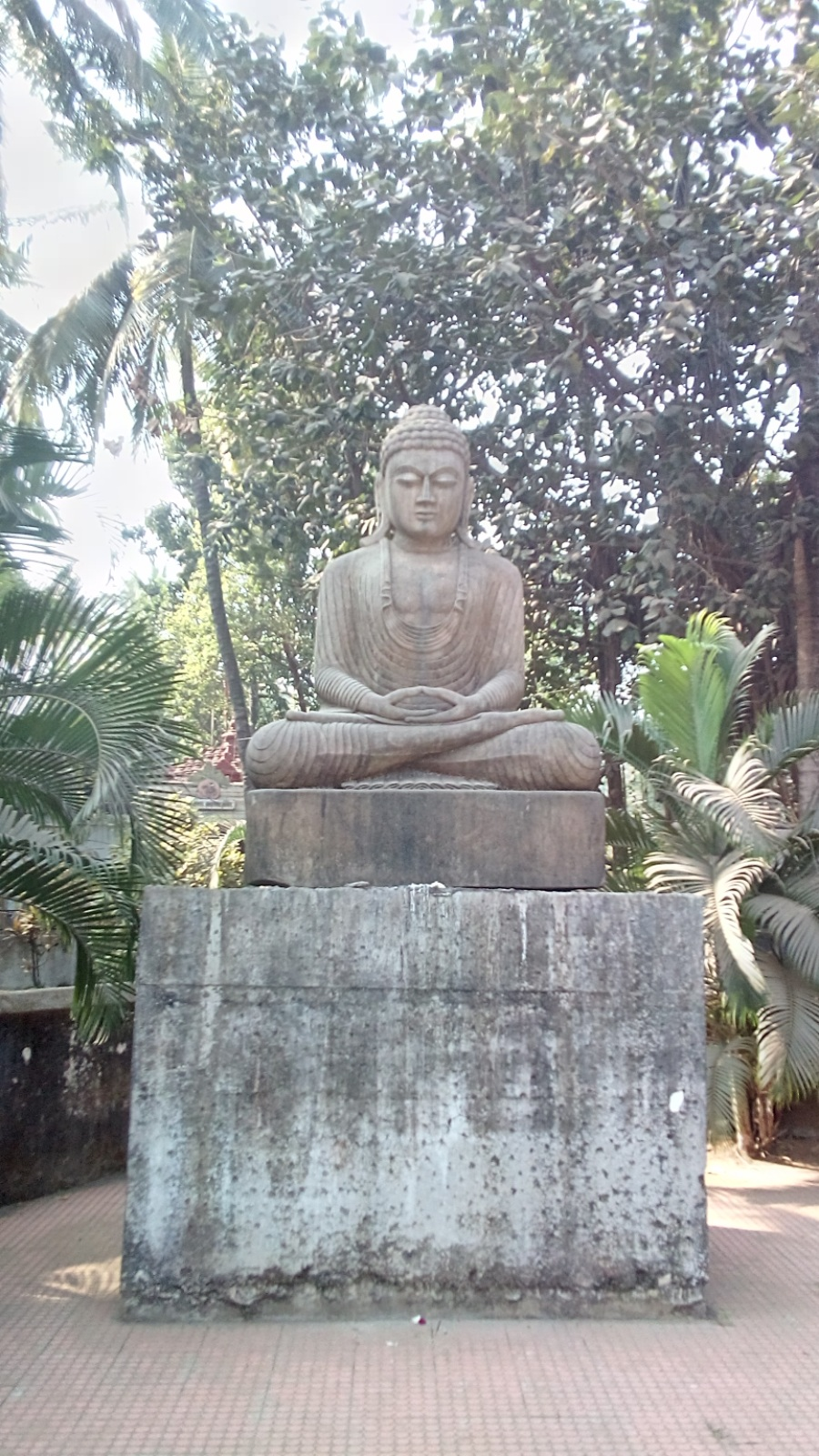
Statue of Buddha at Sopara Stupa.

In April 1882, Bhagvanlal Indraji, a noted archaeologist, numismatist and epigraphist excavated at the Burud Rajache Kot mound in Merdes village, near Sopara. The ruins of a Buddhist Stupa were found. From the center of the stupa (inside a brick-built chamber) a large stone coffer was excavated which contained eight bronze images of Maitreya Buddha which belong to the c. 8th-9th century CE. This coffer also enclosed relic caskets of copper, silver, stone, crystal and gold, along with numerous gold flowers and fragments of a begging bowl. A silver coin of Gautamiputra Satakarni (Satavahana) was also found from the mound. The Bombay Provincial Government presented the Sopara relics to the Asiatic Society of Bombay. The coins and the artifacts found during the excavations at the site of this ancient town can still be viewed in the Asiatic Society of Mumbai museum. In an old Muslim graveyard near Ramkund, the fragments of 8th and 9th major rock edicts of Asoka were found. These rock edicts can be viewed in the Chhatrapati Shivaji Maharaj Vastu Sangrahalaya, Mumbai. The site was re-excavated by M.M.Qureshi of the Archaeological Survey of India in 1939–1940, when several stone lintels and two small stupas were found on the south side of the main stupa in addition to a few sherds of plain glazed ware of the Muslim period. Anwar Munshi (1972) found a number of Satavahana lead coins at Sopara. In 1956, a fragment of 11th major rock edict was found from a coastal village, Bhuigaon.

The ancient habitation site lies 2 km away from the stupa which overlooks the dry creek on the south and on the east opens to Thane creek. A large quantity of Islamic Glazed Ware, Black and Red Ware were found at the site. It seems that during the Early Historical period, Sopara was located on the mainland facing Agashi island on the north and Bassein to the south. The backwaters between the mainland and the island were suitable for the movement and anchorage of ships. Gass and Nirmal villages were once part of the creek. A number of tanks and architectural remains are noticed in the areas adjoining these villages. All the ancient relics were found in the area between the stupa and the creek. Up to the 19th century, this creek was navigable and ships of 20 tonnes used to ply here. The significance of the architectural pieces becomes more important when the surface findings arc taken into account. The area around Bhatela Pond is a landing place or bunder, where even remains of a Portuguese jetty and customs house are seen. Exploration (1994) in the adjoining area has yielded Red Polished Ware and Glazed Ware. The evidence is further corroborated by a joint excavation in 1993 carried out by the Archaeological Survey of India and the British Academy, Hyderabad where antiquities of the Early Historical period (Satavahana and Kashatrapa period) – lead and copper coins, semi-precious stone beads, small fragments of Northern Black Polished Ware, amphorae pieces and Islamic Blue Glazed ware were discovered. An earthen wall and a fourteen coarse stone wall with varying sizes of stone blocks were also encountered during this excavation.

It is clearly evident from the archaeological and literary sources that Sopara was the main entrepot dating from the pre-Asokan period up to the 3rd century A.D. and again from 9th to 13th century A.D. There is no evidence of cultural remains from 4th to 9th century and it seems that during this period Sopara had lost its importance. The main cause for the decline of the ancient port of Sopara was due to the effect of siltation caused by a rise in sea level. Further near-shore and off-shore marine archaeological exploration and excavation would be helpful to ascertain the extent of the ancient port city.

== Sopara Edicts of Ashoka ==
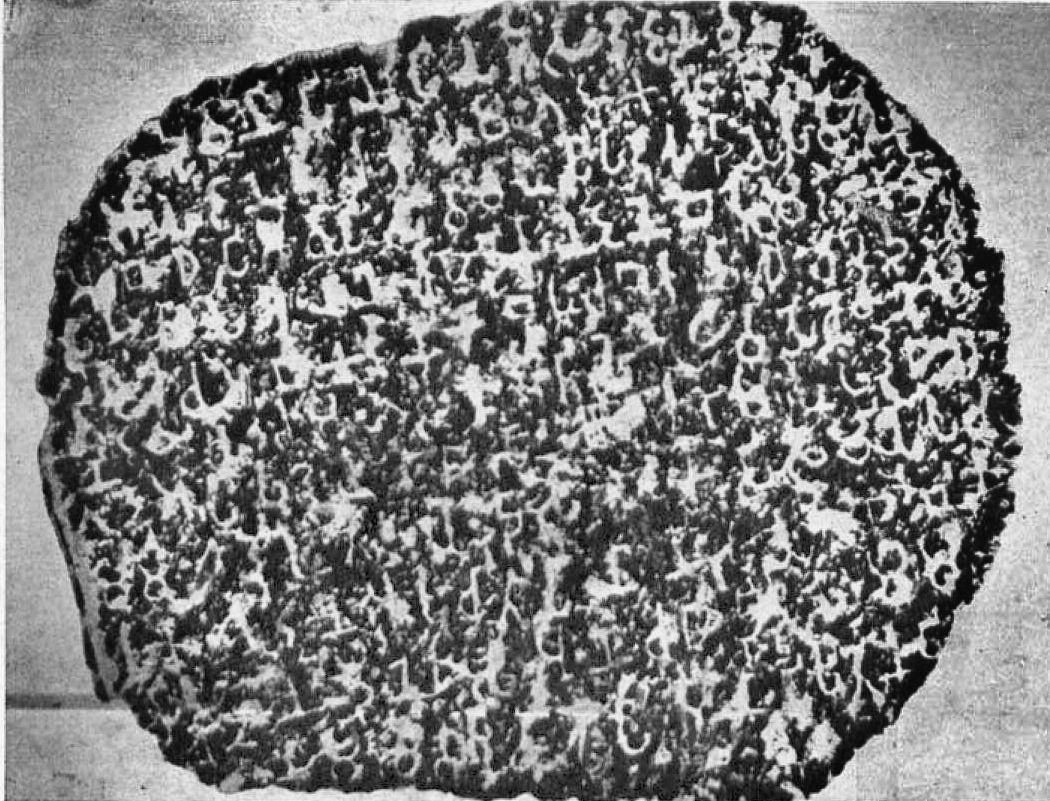
Ashoka Major Rock Edicts at Sopara.

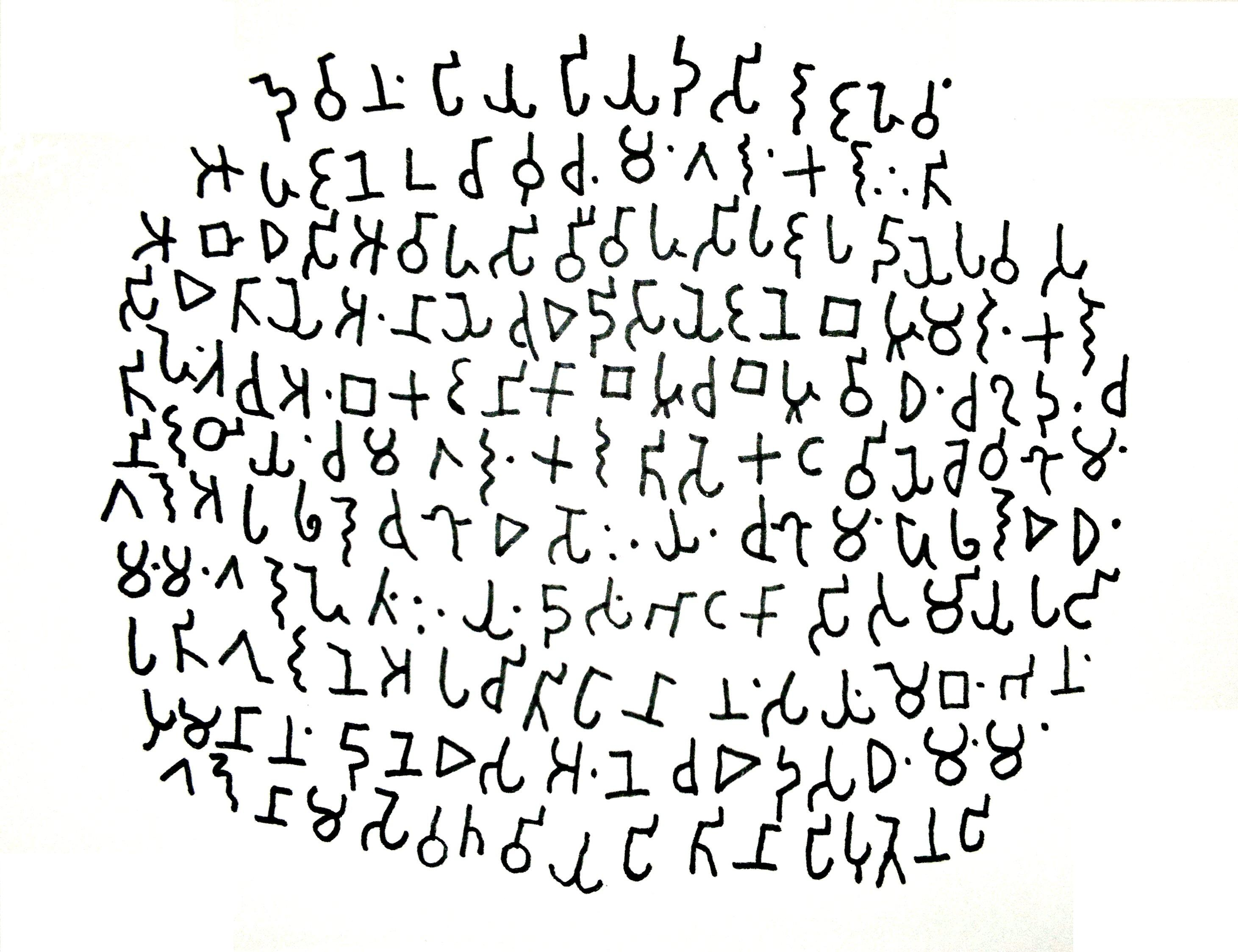
Transcription of the Edicts.

The following are translations of the fragments of the edicts found at Sopara by Bhagavan Lal Indraji in 1882. In these edicts, Ashoka refers to himself as "Devanampiya"(Beloved of The Gods) and "Piyadassi" (The handsome one).

== Demographics ==
As of 2001 India census, Nala Sopara had a population of 184,664. It is one of the well-known satellite city of Mumbai. Males constitute 54% of the population and females 46%. Nala Sopara has an average literacy rate of 79%, higher than the national average of 74.04%: male literacy is 77%, and female literacy is 82%. In Nala Sopara, 13% of the population is under 6 years of age.

Among minority languages, Gujarati is spoken by 17.82% of the population, Urdu by 12% and Hindi by 22.92%.

== Places of importance ==
The Chakreshwar Mahadev Mandir (19.416982°N 72.798733°E) is an ancient shrine dedicated to Lord Śiva. This is a relatively small temple and is noted as the holy place where Svāmi Samarth performed dhyānam, pratiṣhṭha of a Rām Mandir nearby and blessed a śiṣhya who undertook a sajīva samādhi at this very place. The temple lies at one corner of the Chakreshwar lake in Nallasopara West.

== Education ==
Schools in this place include St. Aloysius High School, Nallasopara.

== Reference in literature ==
A Gujarati novel-based on historical events written by Zaverchand Meghani named Gujaratno Jay mentions that parents of famous Jain laymen Vastupal and Tejpal who constructed Dilwara Temples had stayed in Sopara for some period of time after running away from home.

== See also ==
- Indian maritime history
- Surparaka kingdom
