= Vasai Creek Railway Bridge =

Bridge in India

The Vasai Creek Railway Bridge is located between Western Railway's Bhayandar and Naigaon railway stations, above the Vasai Creek in Maharashtra. This rail bridge starts from Bhayandar at the northern end of Salsette Island, passes through Panju Island, and ends at Naigaon on the mainland.

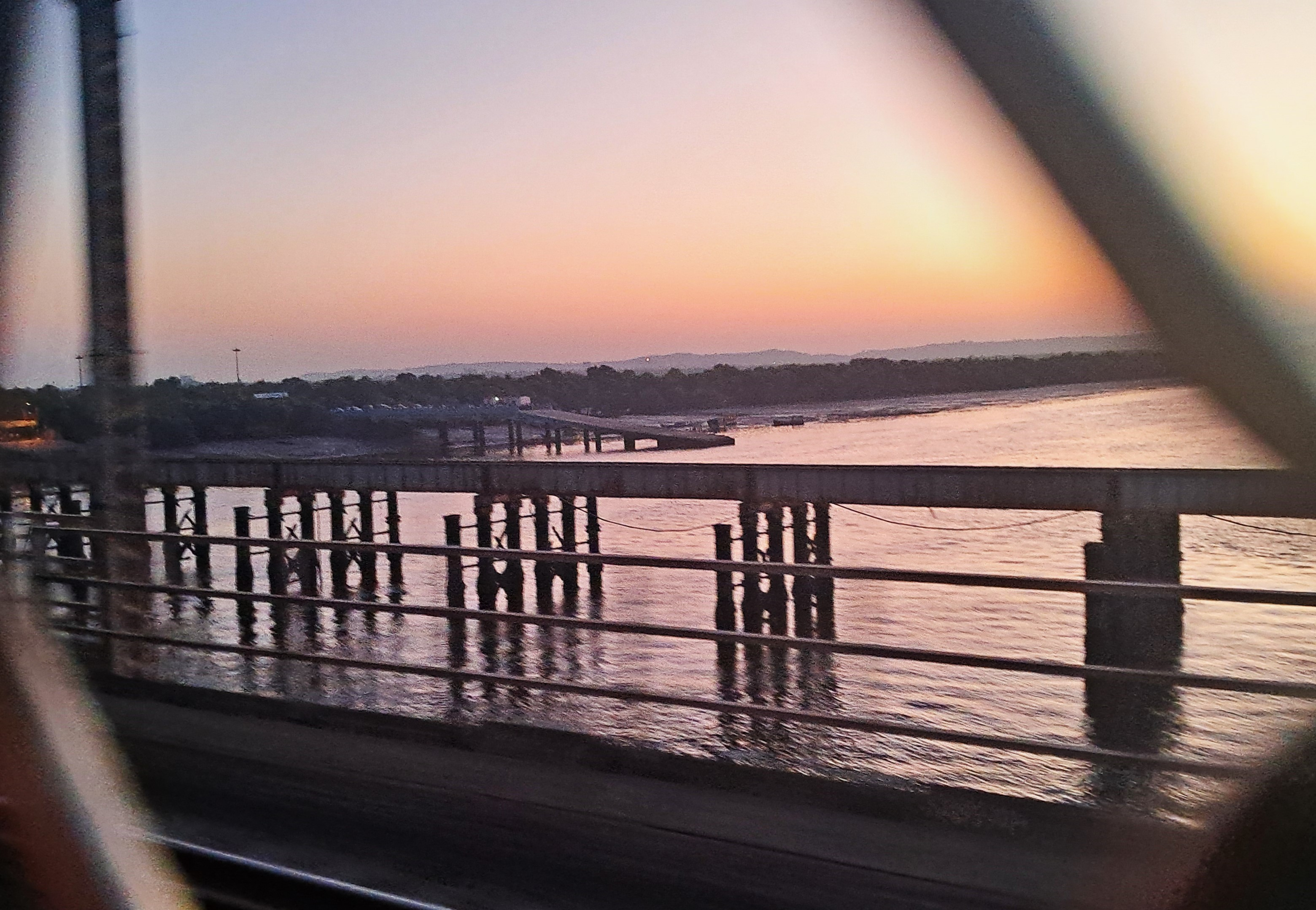
The Old Bassein Creek Railway Bridges

== History ==
When the BB&CI Railway's (precursor to Western Railway) first line was to be laid between Ahmedabad and Bombay, the Bassein Creeks (Vasai Creeks) were among the more formidable obstacles. The creeks were regarded as 'tidal', with high and low tides ranging a difference of around 15 ft (4.572 m). The creek was divided into two by the intermediate Panjoo island (Panju Island), and hence the crossing bridge too had to be divided as such. They were opened for traffic, when the Grant Rd-Ahmedabad line opened in 1864. The Southern portion of this bridge was 4,312'-6'' (1,314.45 m) long, while the Northern portion was just 1,562'-6'' (476.25 m) long. The Bridges were erected with 60 ft (18.288 m) deck Warren Girders, on 2'-6'' (0.762 m) diameter cast iron screw piles. These were screwed till depths, the shallowest being 20 ft (6.096 m), the deepest 72 ft (21.945 m). The bridge piers were 62'-6'' (19.05 m) centres, and each consisted of three piles, 14 ft (4.267 m) centres. These were held together, with 14 ft (4.627 m) long bearing girders. The Southern Bassein was bridged by 69 spans, the Northern by just 25. For Screwing, 16 oxen yokes were employed. These would move in circular paths on rafts anchored in set positions.

Fisherman standing beside the older (1860s) Bassein Bridge, c. 1923

With passing years, the bridge's girders and foundations were found weak for increasing loads. Between the years 1896-1902 it was deemed necessary to strengthen the structure. In fact, when the Government of Bombay later appointed C.H. Merz as a consultant for the electrification of suburban railways, he had suggested the replacement of the Bassein Bridge. The warren girders were replaced with fish plate girders, and the foundations were strengthened with the addition of 2' 6" diameter screw piles to each Pier, on both the west and east sides. Besides, a continuous girder was introduced over the five piles. In screwing the additional piles, a different method from the previous one was utilised. The capstan had radiating arms, forming a 12 ft diameter circle, and around this ropes were wound in opposing directions, and the falls were fastened to hand winches.

Eventually, it was discovered that even the above reinforcements were inadequate to bear the ever increasing traffic loads, and investigations were commenced for replacement of the bridges. Around this time, speed restrictions were imposed on the trains passing through the bridges. Local trains were limited to 15 mph (24 kph), while through trains were limited to 8 mph (13 kph). Several alternatives were considered, and it was finally decided that the new bridge must be built 120 ft east of the old bridges, to avoid the stone pitching dumped around the old piers. These were to have the same number and length of spans as the old bridges, but capable of withstanding the BB&CI Standard loading of 1916.

15 Down crossing the South Bassein Bridge at 8 mph

The piers were to be of braced cast iron screw piles. Every pier would comprise six piles spaced 9 ft centres. Five of these piles would be 3 ft in diameter, with a 5' 8" diameter cast steel blade, while the westernmost pile (the fender pile) would be 2' 6" in diameter, with a 4' 6" diameter blade. The westernmost pile was to be kept 3 ft in diameter, so as to allow future widening of the bridges, in case the line would be quadrupled .

The Panjoo Island served as the base of operations, where the main stocking house, powerhouse, and stores were located. Preliminary works for the construction of approach banks and stacking yards were commenced at the start of 1920, but the preparatory works wasn't taken in hand until the start of 1923. Although it was initially expected that all plant would be ready for work by 1923-24; however this was delayed due to the non delivery of electrical and other plant. The bridges reached an advanced stage of construction in August 1925.

Experiments with Capstan and Pile screwing operations at Panju Island as a part of Bassein Bridge reconstruction, 11 Sept 1923

The original steel bridge was decommissioned and replaced by the new, first concrete bridge to the east in 1983. The second concrete bridge was constructed in 2004 as part of the Borivali–Virar quadrupling work, however the 3rd & 4th tracks between Borivali and Virar weren't opened until 2007. 2018, a dredger, 'Sea King' hit the piers of the abandoned bridge.

== Bridge Information ==
- Overall Length: 5 kilometres (3.1 mi)
- Width: 12 metres (39 ft)

== Gallery ==
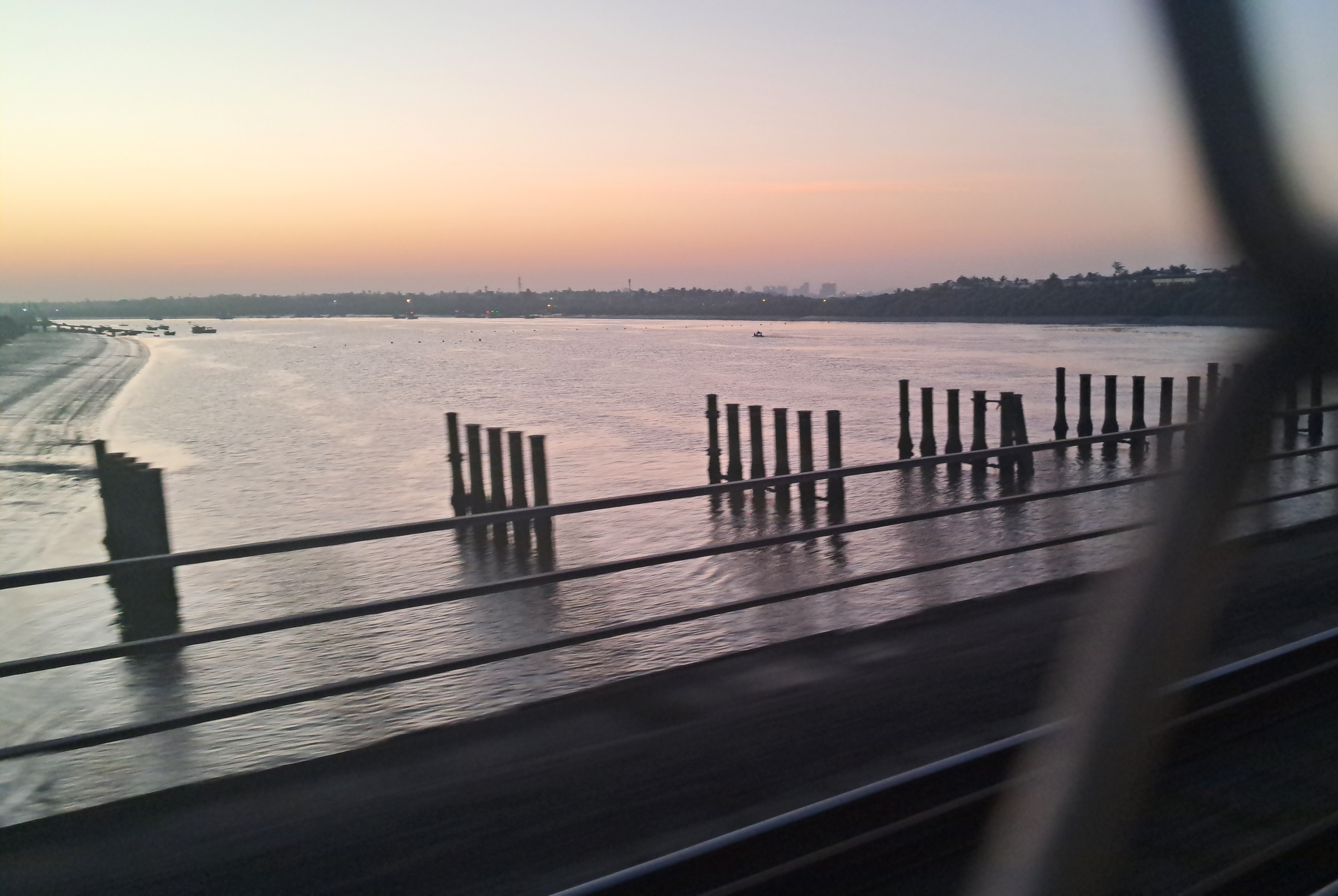
The remains of the Old North Bassein Creek Bridge

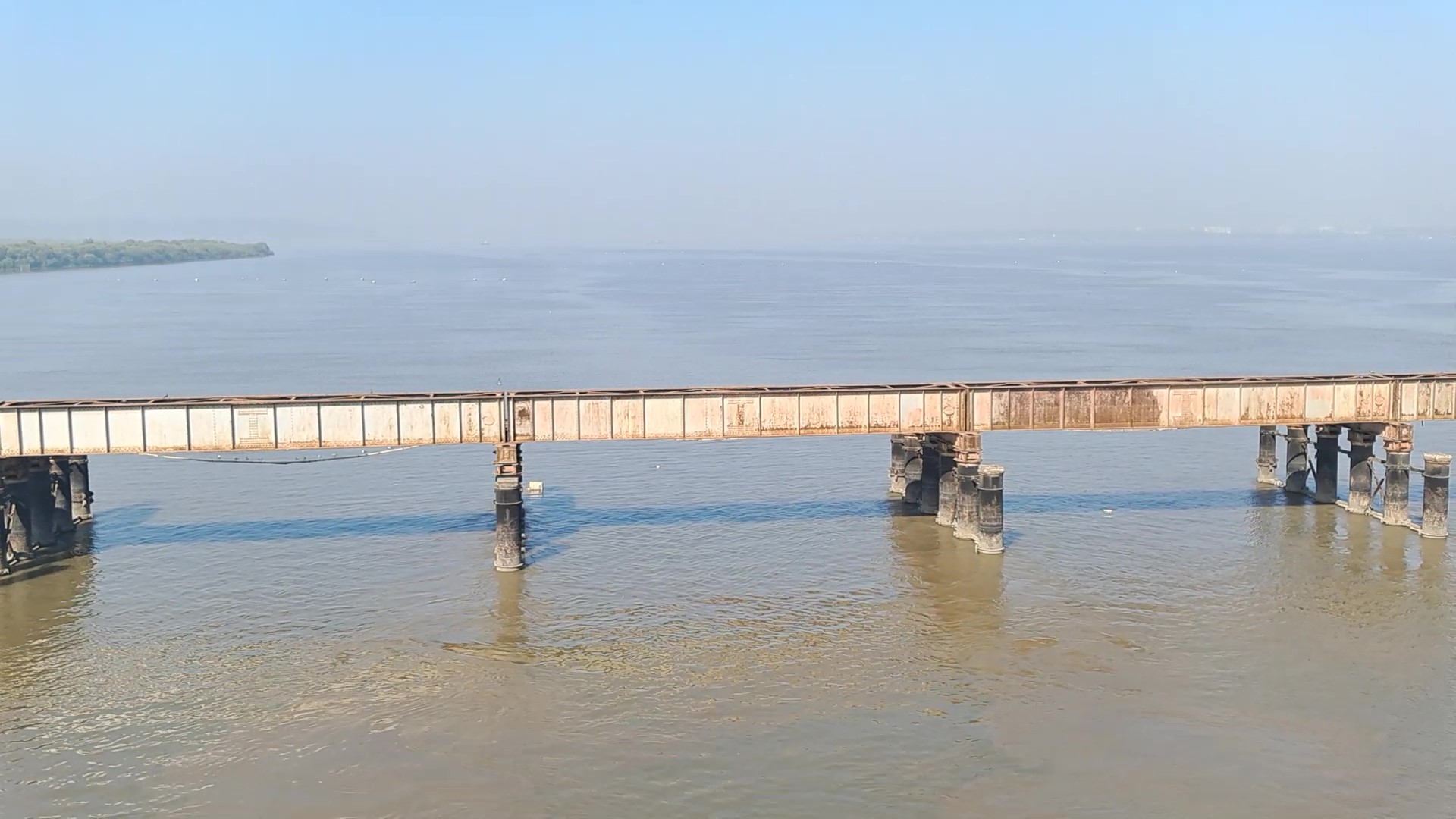
The Old South Bassein Creek Railway Bridge, in a better condition

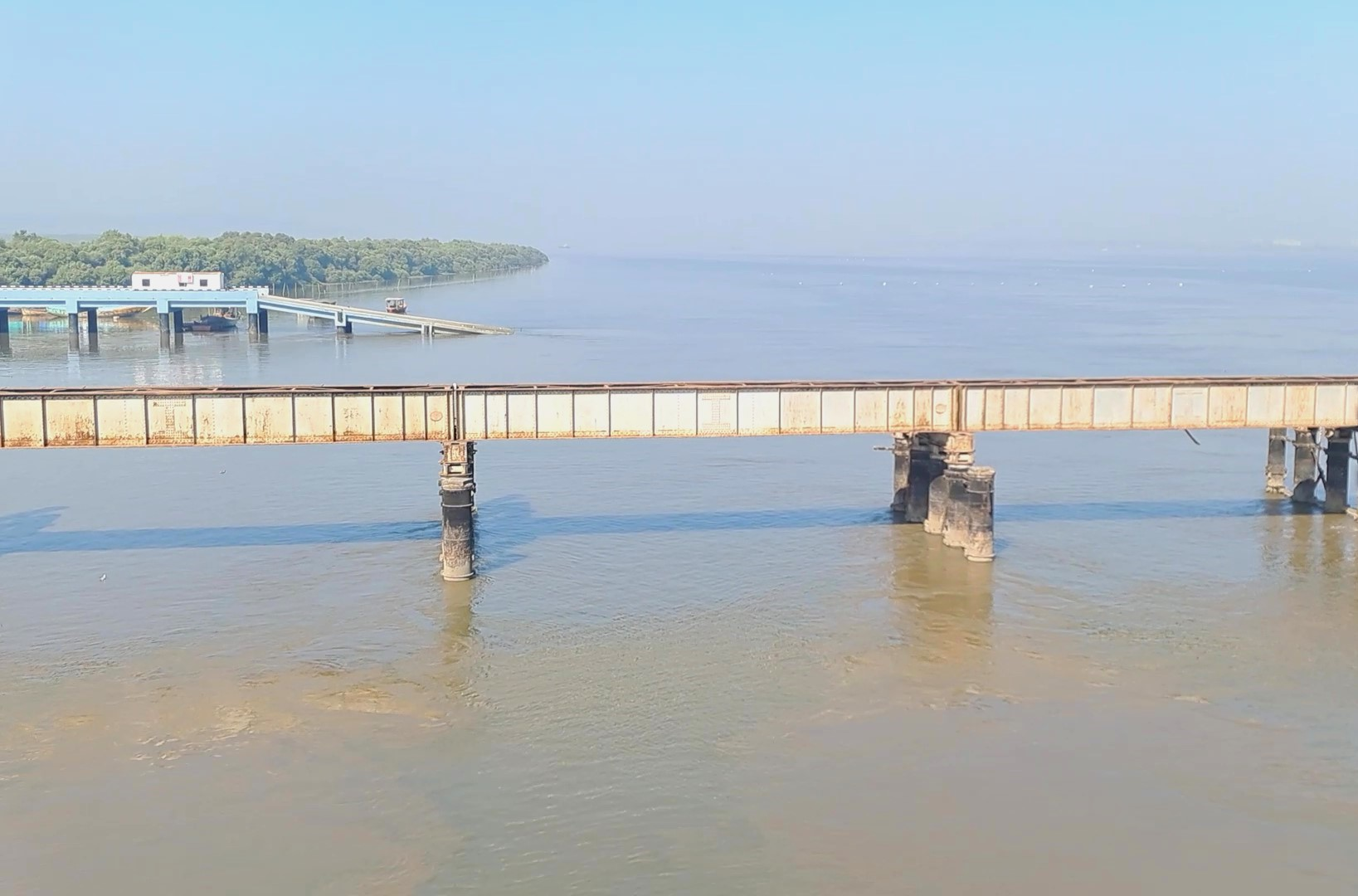
The Old South Bassein Creek Railway Bridge

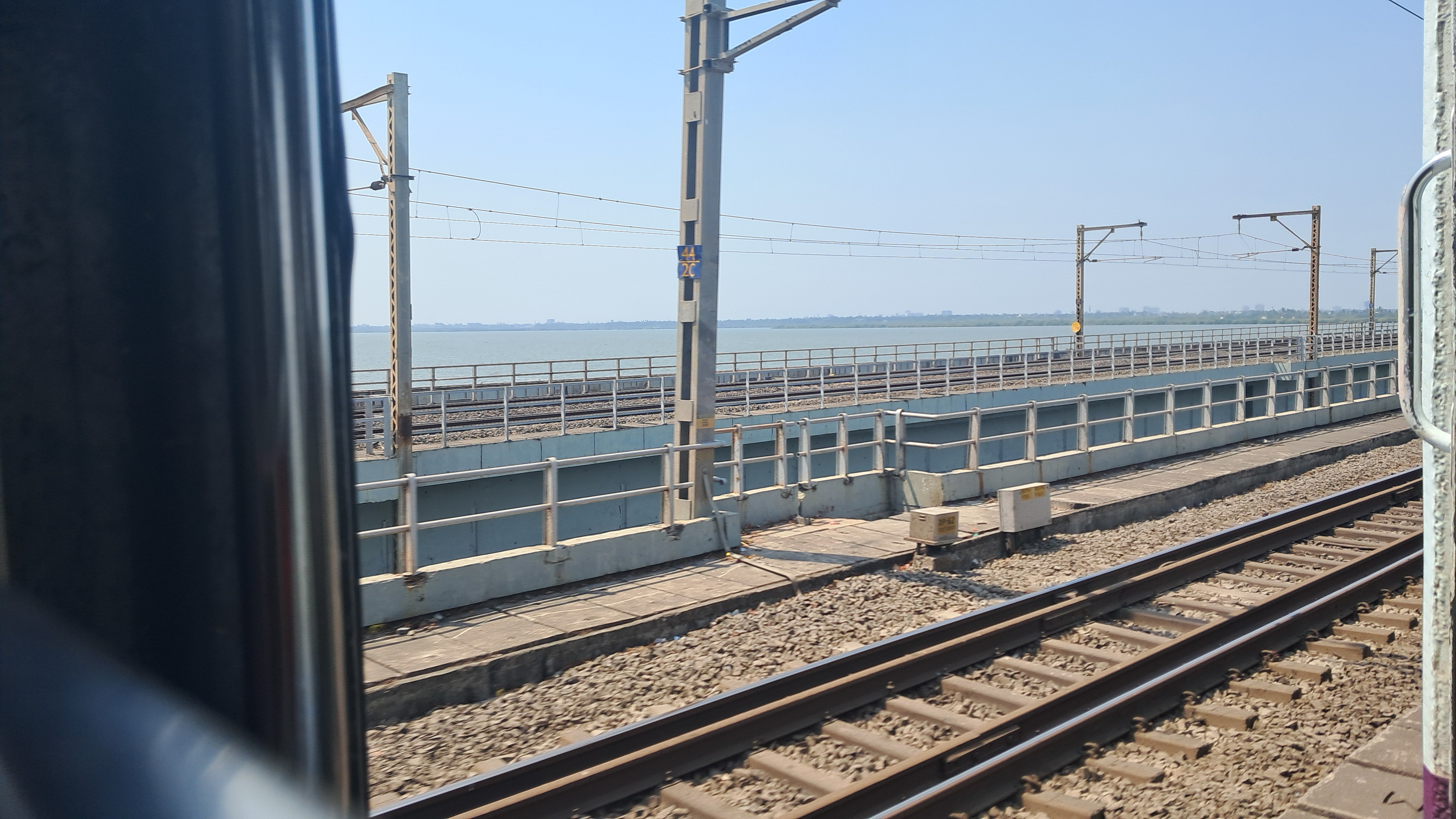
A view of the new South Bassein Bridges from a Local; looking northward
