= Vasai-Virar City Municipal Corporation =

Local civic body in Vasai-Virar, Maharashtra, India

Vasai-Virar City Municipal Corporation Vasaī-Virāra Śahara Mahānagarapālikā

Type
- Term limits: 5 Years

History
- Founded: 3 July 2010 (16 years ago)

Leadership
- Mayor: Ajiv Patil, BVA
- Deputy Mayor: Marshal Lopes, BVA
- Municipal Commissioner: Manoj Suryavanshi

Structure
- Seats: 115
- Political groups: Government (71): BVA (70); INC (1); Opposition (44): BJP (43); SHS (1)

Elections
- Last election: 15 January 2026
- Next election: 2031

Website
- vvcmc.in

Vasai-Virar City Municipal Corporation (VVCMC) is the civic body that governs areas and villages in Vasai-Virar taluka in Maharashtra, India comprising the most populated part of Palghar district. According to the 2011 census, it is the fifth largest city in Maharashtra with a population of more than 1.3 million. The city is located 50 km north of Mumbai, on the north bank of Vasai Creek, part of the estuary of the Ulhas River. It was formed on 3 July 2010 by combining four municipal councils and 53 gram panchayats.

== City Areas & Towns under VVCMC ==
- City under VVCMC:
1. Virar
2. Nalasopara
3. Vasai
4. Naigaon
- Towns under VVMC:
1. Virar Nagar Parishad
2. Nallasopara Nagar Parishad
3. Vasai Nagar Parishad

49 Coastal Villages are considered as excluded from the VVCMC administration

== List of Mayor ==
The Mayor of Vasai-Virar is the first citizen of the Indian city of Vasai-Virar. This person is the chief of the Vasai Virar Municipal Corporation of Vasai-Virar region, but the role is largely ceremonial as the real powers are vested in the post of the Municipal Commissioner currently held by D. Gangadhar. The Mayor also plays a functional role in deliberating over the discussions in the Corporation.

Rajeev Patil alias Nana first held this post after creation. Other local leaders like Praveena Thakur, wife of four time member of Maharashtra Legislative Assembly Hitendra Thakur of Bahujan Vikas Aaghadi and Narayan Mankar of the same party have held this post amongst others.

=== Mayors of Vasai-Virar ===
- 28 March 2010 – 4 January 2012 : Shri. Rajeev Patil
- 5 January 2012 – 28 June 2015: Shri. Narayan Mankar
- 29 June 2015 – 28 December 2017: Sau. Pravina Thakur
- 29 December 2017 – 25 July 2019: Shri. Rupesh Jadhav
- 26 July 2019 – 22 August 2019: Shri. Narayan Mankar
- 23 August 2019 – 28 June 2020: Shri. Pravin Shetty
- 3 Feb 2026 - Present: Shri. Ajiv Patil

== List of Deputy Mayor ==
- 1st Deputy Mayor: Sagir Ahmed Dange, First Muslim Deputy Mayor in VVCMC
- 4th Deputy Mayor: Prakash Rodrigues, First Roman Catholic Deputy Mayor in VVCMC
- 5th Deputy Mayor: Marshal Dominic Lopes(3rd Feb 2026 - Present), Second Roman Catholic Deputy Mayor in VVCMC

== Services ==
The VVMC is responsible for aiding in prevention of epidemic outbreaks through mass production of medicines, Cemeteries and Crematoria, Fire Stations, Garbage disposal and street cleanliness, House Tax, Lighthouses, Maintenance of parks and open spaces, Markets, shops, and establishments, Municipal water, Public health and hospitals, Registering of births and deaths, Removal of encroachments, Security, Sewage treatment and disposal, Street lighting, Transport and Construction of Roads.

== Revenue sources ==
The following are the Income sources for the corporation from the central and state government.

=== Revenue from taxes ===
Following is the Tax related revenue for the corporation.

- Property tax.
- Profession tax.
- Entertainment tax.
- Grants from Central and State Government like Goods and Services Tax.
- Advertisement tax.

=== Revenue from non-tax sources ===
Following is the Non Tax related revenue for the corporation.

- Water usage charges.
- Fees from Documentation services.
- Rent received from municipal property.
- Funds from municipal bonds.

== Administration ==
VVMC Head Office, Virar

VVMC Office, Mardes Village

The Vasai-Virar City Municipal Corporation is headed by a municipal commissioner who is an IAS officer. The commissioner wields the executive powers of the house. A quinquennial election is held to elect corporators to power whose duties are to ensure that their constituencies have the basic civic infrastructure in place and that there is no lacuna on the part of the authorities. The mayor (a largely ceremonial post with limited duties) heads the party with the largest vote. All administrative proceedings in the VVMC are conducted in Marathi.

City officials
Mayor	Mr Ajiv Yashwant Patil
Municipal commissioner & Administrator	Mr. Manojkumar Suryawanshi (I.A.S.)

== LBT-GST ==
Local Body Tax (LBT) is a levy that traders have to pay the local municipal corporation for goods imported to the state. It is an account-based tax for every raw material used or imported into the city's limits by all businesses, traders and manufacturers and replaces traditional tax collections. All shopkeepers who sell goods over a certain value have to pay LBT. It ranges from 0% to 7% and is computed based on a trader's turnover.

VVMC started collecting LBT from 1 April 2011.

Vasai-Virar is a city and tehsil (subdistrict) in Maharashtra state in western India, comprising the most populated part of Palghar district. It is a suburb of Mumbai. According to the 2011 census, it is the fifth largest city in Maharashtra. It is located in Palghar district, 50 km north of Mumbai. The city is located on the north bank of Vasai Creek, part of the estuary of the Ulhas River. Vasai-Virar City Municipal Corporation (VVMC) covers the tehsil.

Vasai-Virar is an agglomeration of several, formerly separate, towns. The area covered by the city roughly corresponds to the ancient city of Sopara.

== Demographics ==
The population of Vasai-Virar was 1,343,402 at the 2011 census, up from 693,350 in 2001, 365,480 in 1991, and 219,868 in 1981, there exists slums and villages as well as urban zones.

=== Vasai Virar Religion Census ===
The population of Vasai Virar City comprises many different religions. Among them, Hinduism is practiced by 943,165 people which makes up to 78.05% of the total population, which is below the national average of 80.5%. The table given below shows the total populations of different religions that are practiced along with their percentage.

Religion	Total	Male	Female	Percentage
Hindu	1,048,582	557,942	490,640	78.05%
Muslim	113,475	60,777	52,698	8.45%
Christian	110,860	55,183	55,677	8.25%
Buddhist	34,052	17,484	16,568	2.53%
Jain	23,474	12,050	11,424	1.75%
Not Stated	8,068	3,775	4,293	0.60%
Sikh	2,663	1,404	1,259	0.20%
Others	2,228	1,156	1,072	0.17%

=== City population statistics ===
The table given below shows the total population of Vasai Virar Municipal Corporation, further segregated into Rural and Urban, as well as, Male and Female numbers in the total population.

	Population	Rural	Urban
Total	1,343,402	113,262	1,230,140
Male	709,771	57,562	652,209
Female	633,631	55,700	577,931

=== Children ===
The total children population (below 6 years of age) is given below further divided into Rural, Urban, Male and Female Numbers.

	Population	Rural	Urban
Total	162,841	14,575	148,266
Male	84,938	7,360	77,578
Female	77,903	7,215	70,688

=== Sex Ratio ===
The total sex ratio along with Rural and Urban as well as Children and Adult Numbers is given in the following table:

	Total	Rural	Urban
Children (0–6)	917	980	911
Adult (7+)	893	968	886

=== Literacy ===
The literacy rates of Vasai Virar is shown in the below given table. The table shows the numbers as well as the percentage literacy of Rural and Urban population of Vasai Virar. It also shows literacy numbers and percentage of male and females.

	Total	Rural	Urban
Total Number	1,033,649	75,635	958,014
Total %	87.6%	76.6%	88.6%
Male (Number)	567,948	41,966	525,982
Male (%)	90.0%	83.6%	91.5%
Female (Number)	465,701	33,669	432,032
Female (%)	83.8%	69.4%	85.2%

=== Working Population ===
The table shows the total as well as rural and urban working population of Vasai Virar. It also shows the male and female working populations.

	Total	Rural	Urban
Total Number	493,408	45,371	448,037
Male	379,419	29,858	349,561
Female	113,989	15,513	98,476

== Civic administration ==
The Vasai-Virar Town is governed by two bodies, the Vasai-Virar Municipal Corporation and Gram Panchayats of the villages that are excluded from the Municipal Corporation.

=== Vasai-Virar Municipal Corporation ===
The Vasai-Virar Municipal Corporation (VVMC) was formed on 3 July 2009. It is headed by a Municipal commissioner, an Indian Administrative Service officer who wields the executive power. A quinquennial election is held to elect the governing body, who are responsible for overseeing that their constituencies have the basic civic infrastructure in place, and that there is no lacuna on the part of the authorities. The position of mayor is a largely ceremonial post with limited duties but the office-holder heads the party with the largest vote.

== Municipal Corporation Elections ==
=== Municipal Corporation Election 2010 ===
==== Political Performance in Election 2010 ====
S.No.	Party name	Party flag or symbol	Number of Corporators
01	Indian National Congress (INC)		02
02	Bharatiya Janata Party (BJP)		01
03	Bahujan Vikas Aghadi (BVA)		55
04	Shiv Sena (SS)		03
05	Maharashtra Navnirman Sena (MNS)		01
06	Other Registered Parties		19
07	Independents		08

=== Municipal Corporation Election 2026 ===
==== Political performance in Election 2026 ====
S.No.	Party name	Party flag or symbol	Number of Corporators	
01	Bahujan Vikas Aghadi (BVA)		71	▼35
02	Bharatiya Janata Party (BJP)		43	▲42
03	Shiv Sena (SS)		01	-

== Transport ==
=== Railways ===
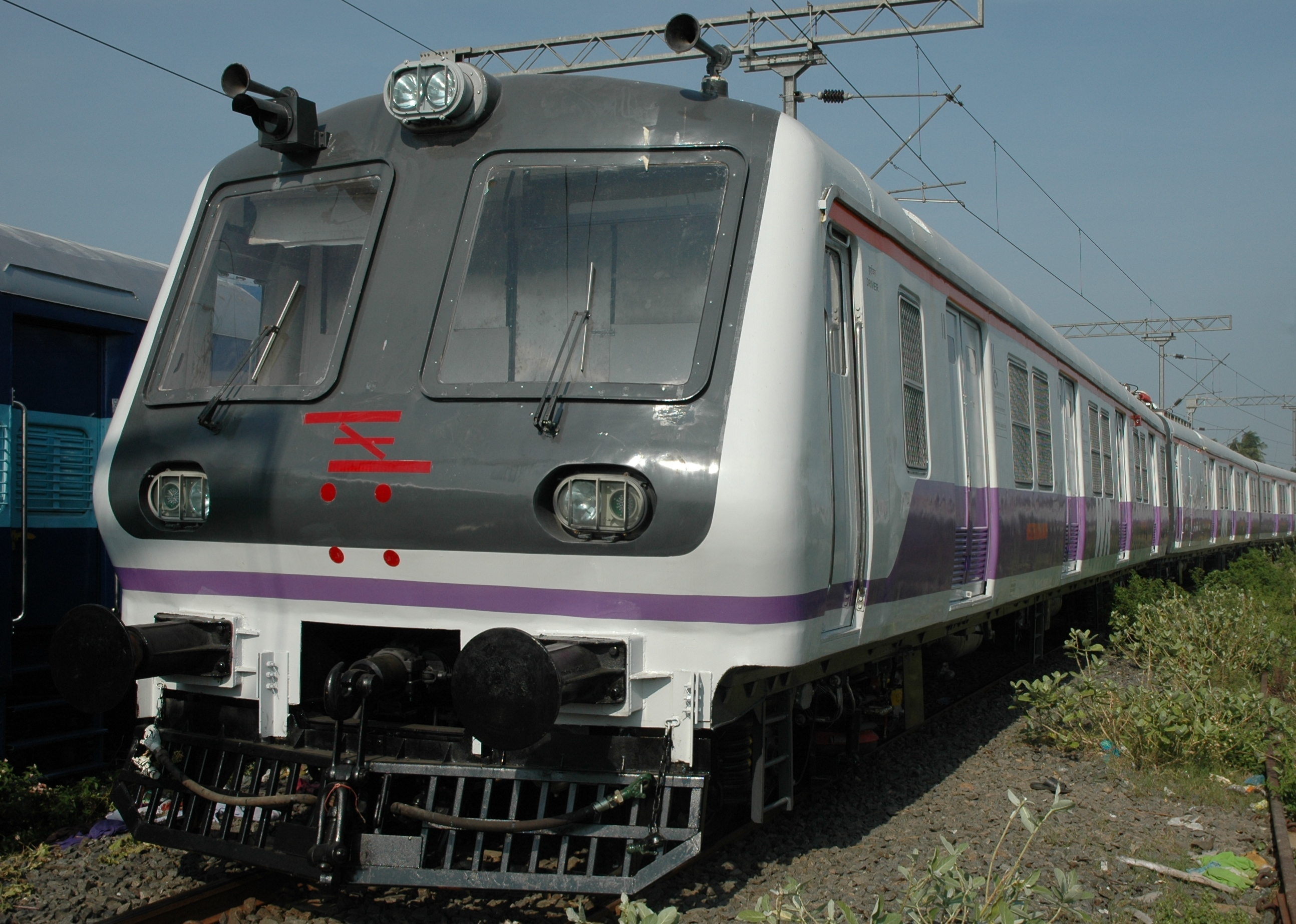
Mumbai Suburban Local Train

Western Railway Line passing through Vasai Virar

Vasai-Virar City is Connected by Western & Central Railway. The Major Railway Stations on Western & Central Railway in Vasai-Virar city are

- Virar railway station (Western Railway): All Local, DMU Train, Memu, Shuttle, Express & Passenger Trains halt or Depart from here.
- Nallasopara railway station (Western Railway) : All Local DMU & Memu halt here.
- Vasai Road railway station (Western / Central Railway) : Vasai Road Railway Station is a Junction. All Local, DMU, Memu, Shuttle, Express & Passenger Trains halt or Depart from here.
- Naigaon railway station (Western Railway) : All Local Trains halt here.
- Juchandra railway station (Central Railway) : All DMU & MEMU halt here.
- Kaman Road railway station (Central Railway) : All DMU & MEMU halt here.

=== Road ===
Marcopolo Bus

Mini Bus

Vasai-Virar City Municipal Corporation started its own transport service on 3 October 2012 in association with Bhagirathi Transport Corporation Pvt Ltd, known as VVMT. It operates a large number of bus lines in the Vasai-Virar city. VVMT also plies its buses in Vasai-Virar villages. It also has operation outside city limits into neighbouring city of Mira-Bhayander, Thane City & Mumbai City. VVMT bus ply from Vasai to Thane & Vasai to Mulund.

Other Towns & Cities where VVMT Buses connects
Mira-Bhayander City
Thane City
Mumbai City

Information of VVMT Bus Routes & Bus Depot
No of Bus Routes	32
No of Depots	1 (Agarwal Nagar, Vasai East) 2 (Navghar, Vasai East)

Operations
The VVMT uses diesel powered buses for its operation. The majority of the VVMT display boards will only have the destination name written in Marathi. All buses with electronic display board are introduced in the fleet, which have destination with the route number flashing in Marathi as well as in English on front of the buses.

The VVMT bus routes are spread city-wide and also to neighboring cities and towns. The VVMT operates inter-city services to three different areas beyond the municipal limits of Vasai-Virar city, i.e. into the limits of the Municipal Corporations of Mira-Bhayander, Thane and Mumbai.

Vasai-Virar city
The local bus services of the city, which are operated by VVMC. The internal places of Vasai-Virar city which are far from the Virar, Nalasopara, Vasai Road Railway Stations are connected by VVMT. The major concentration has always been Vasai-Virar city and with vast growing population in the city.

Vasai-Virar Villages
It is not official, but some faraway villages from the Virar, Nalasopara and Vasai are connected by VVMT buses. VVMT services are not so frequent in villages as in the city.

Mira-Bhayander City
Bhayander and Mira Road are connected to Vasai by VVMT. Services start from Virar, Nalasopara and Vasai Road Railway Stations towards Bhanyander and Mira Road. The inter city connection between the Vasai-Virar city (which on the western railway side) and Thane / Central Mumbai City (which is on the central railway side) via Mira – Bhayander City.

Thane City
Thane City is connected to Vasai by the VVMT. From Vasai it starts its services towards Thane. The inter city connection is between Vasai-Virar city (which is on the western railway side) and Thane City / Central Mumbai City (via Thane City) (which is on the central railway side).

Mumbai City
Brihanmumbai Electricity Supply and Transport (BEST) is the largest public transport provider in the Mumbai city & suburbs. VVMT connects the last station in Mumbai's north-eastern suburb Mulund to the Vasai-Virar city. The inter-city connection is between Vasai-Virar city on the western railway side and Central Mumbai City on the central railway side.

== Sports ==
=== Vasai-Virar Mayor's Marathon ===
Sachin at Vasai-Virar Mayor's Marathon in 2014

Ritesh Deshmukh at Vasai-Virar Mayor's Marathon

Vasai-Virar Mayor's Marathon is marathon race organised in Vasai-Virar area of Mumbai. Vasai-Virar City Municipal Corporation hosts the Vasai-Virar Mayor's Marathon every year. Every Year Participants from all over Vasai Taluka & from the country take part in the Marathon.

The Vasai-Virar Mayor's Marathon event is conceptualized by Aryanz Sports PR and Events for the Vasai Virar City Municipal Corporation. Its inaugural edition was in 2011 as a state level event. It got National level status in 2012.

The event is a National Level running event, recognized by AFI, which has a Full Marathon for men and women in different age groups. There is also a Half Marathon for Men & Women in different age groups and 11 km open run for amateurs as well as boys under 18 and Category races for Boys & Girls under-18, between 14 and 16, 12 to 14 and 10–12.

The event also offers separate prize money to participants from the Vasai Virar Taluka region in the Full Marathon and Half Marathon and 11 km Run timed races .

The event sees participation in excess of 15,000 across various categories and offers prize money in excess of Rs 30 lakhs.

The event has seen participation from all the top long-distance athletes of the country, among them names like G Lakshmanan, Lyngkhoi Bining, Elam, Singh, Deep Chand, Sanvroo Yadav, Shoji Mathew, Kavita Raut, Sudha Singh, Monika Athare and a host of others big names.

Actor, Model and Running enthusiast Milind Soman has been the 'Face of the Event' since its inception, helping popularise the event, while athletic and sporting greats like Sachin Tendulkar, Anju Bobby George P T Usha, Shiny Wilson, wrestlers Sushil Kumar & Yogeshwar Dutt have graced the occasion as Event Ambassadors.

There has also been the presence of Bollywood personalities like Mahima Choudhary, Riteish Deshmukh and a host of Marathi film and TV personalities.

=== Swimming Pool ===
VVMC has built an Olympic-size swimming pool in Virar.

== Climate ==
Vasai-Virar has a tropical wet and dry climate. This climate is considered to be Aw according to the Köppen-Geiger climate classification. This moderate climate consists of high rainfall days and very few days of extreme temperatures. The driest month is January. There is 0 mm of precipitation in January. With an average of 870 mm, the most precipitation falls in July. With an average of 29.8 °C, May is the warmest month. January has the lowest average temperature of the year. It is 23.1 °C. The precipitation varies 870 mm between the driest month and the wettest month. During the year, the average temperatures vary by 6.7 °C.

Climate data for Vasai-Virar
Month	Jan	Feb	Mar	Apr	May	Jun	Jul	Aug	Sep	Oct	Nov	Dec	Year
Mean daily maximum °C (°F)	28.5 (83.3)	29 (84)	31 (88)	32.5 (90.5)	33.2 (91.8)	32 (90)	29.7 (85.5)	29.5 (85.1)	29.8 (85.6)	32.1 (89.8)	32 (90)	30.3 (86.5)	30.8 (87.5)
Daily mean °C (°F)	23.2 (73.8)	23.7 (74.7)	26.3 (79.3)	28.3 (82.9)	29.8 (85.6)	29 (84)	27.4 (81.3)	27.1 (80.8)	27 (81)	27.8 (82.0)	26.6 (79.9)	24.6 (76.3)	26.7 (80.1)
Mean daily minimum °C (°F)	17.9 (64.2)	18.5 (65.3)	21.6 (70.9)	24.2 (75.6)	26.5 (79.7)	26.1 (79.0)	25.1 (77.2)	24.7 (76.5)	24.3 (75.7)	23.6 (74.5)	21.2 (70.2)	18.9 (66.0)	22.7 (72.9)
Average precipitation mm (inches)	0 (0)	1 (0.0)	1 (0.0)	0 (0)	10 (0.4)	486 (19.1)	870 (34.3)	531 (20.9)	350 (13.8)	71 (2.8)	6 (0.2)	1 (0.0)	2,327 (91.5)
Source: Climate-Data.org (altitude: 5m)

Vasai Virar has been ranked 35th best “National Clean Air City” (under Category 1 >10L Population cities) in India.

== Key promised Deliverables(From 2026-2031) ==
- Vasai-Virar Outer Ring Road
- City Cleanliness
- Dumping ground issue resolution
- Illegal Builders lobby action
- Upgradation of Road infrastructure
- Water connectivity for Villages
- Preservation of in the Western green belt from Arnala-Agashi to Koliwada-Pali
- Upgradation of electricity woes of the populace
- Ensure maintenance of Air & Water pollution under control
- RRTS(Region Rail Transport Service) from Virar HSR to Mumbai Metro Red Line(SCB Station- Bhyander) upto Yellow line(Mandapeshwar/IC Colony Station), Via Virar-Nallasopara Link Road.

== Notable Personalities ==
- Saint Gonsalo Garcia(1556-1597) - First Catholic Saint from India
- Fr. Francis Dbritto(1943-2024, Nandakhal) - Environmentalist & Author of Subodh Bible
- Sr. Nandita Pereira(Nandakhal) - Superior General of Congregation of the Missionary Sisters of the Queen of Apostles (SRA), Vienna(Austria, Europe)
- Bishop Thomas Dabre(Bhuigaon) - 1st Bishop of Vasai
- Bishop Felix Machado(Remedy) - 2nd Bishop of Vasai
- Bishop Thomas Dsouza(Chulne) - 3rd Bishop of Vasai
- Bishop Ivan Pereira(Papdy) - Bishop of Jammu & Kashmir
- Bishop Simon Almeida(Gass) - Bishop of Pune Diocese
- Bishop Elias Gonsalves(Chulne) - Archbishop of Nagpur
- Bishop Malcolm Sequeira(Giriz) - Bishop of Amravati
- Mr. Govinda Ahuja - Bollywood Actor
- Mr. Aayush Mhatre - U19 India Cricket Captain
