= Shurparaka =

Mentioned in the epic Mahabharata

Shurparaka (IAST: Śūrpāraka; also spelt Surparaka) was a kingdom mentioned in the epic Mahabharata. According to Mahabharata, it was founded by Bhargava Rama (also known as Parashurama) near the Western sea, close to the mouth of the river Narmada in India. Parashurama gave this kingdom to the Brahmin rulers of Kashyapa clan.

Shurparaka is identified with medieval Sopara and modern day Nala Sopara.

== References in Mahabharata ==
The Ocean created for Jamadagni’s son (Bhargava Rama) a region called Shurparaka (12:49). Having made the earth destitute of Kshatriyas for thrice seven times, the puissant Bhargava, on completion of a horse-sacrifice, gave away the earth as sacrificial present to Kashyapa.

Kashyapa, having accepted the earth in gift, made a present of it to the Brahmanas, entered the great forest.

=== The pilgrimage in Shurparaka ===
One should proceed to Shurparaka, where Jamadagni’s son had formerly dwelt. Bathing in that tirtha of Rama, one acquireth the merit of giving away gold in abundance. (3:85). In the tirtha called Shurparaka are two sacrificial platforms of the illustrious Jamadagni, called Pashana and Punaschandra (3:88). Yudhishthira plunged his body in all the holy spots, and then came again to Shurparaka (3:118). Bathing in the Narmada as also in the tirtha known by the name of Shurparaka, observing a fast for a full fortnight, one is sure to become in one's next birth a prince of the royal line. (13:25).

=== Sahadeva's expedition to south ===
After bringing King Nila of Avanti under his sway, Sahadeva went further south. He then brought the king of Tripura under his sway. Next, turning his forces against the Paurava kingdom, he vanquished and reduced to subjection its monarch. The prince after this brought Akriti, the king of Saurashtra and preceptor of the Kausikas, under his sway. While staying in the kingdom of Saurashtra, the prince sent an ambassador to King Rukmin, the son of Bhishmaka, within the territories of Bhojakata. The monarch accepted the sway of the son of Pandu. Having exacted jewels and wealth from King Rukmin, Sahadeva marched further to the south. He then reduced to subjection Shurparaka, Talakata, and the Dandakas (2:30).

== References in Mahavamsa ==
The Mahavamsa, the Sri Lankan Pali chronicle, mentions that the legendary founder of the Sinhalese, prince Vijaya, left his homeland of Lala and landed first in Suppāraka (the Pali form of the Sanskrit 'Shurparaka'). It is identified with modern Sopara, in Palgar district north of Mumbai.

== See also ==
- Kingdoms of Ancient India
