= Panju Island =

Island in India

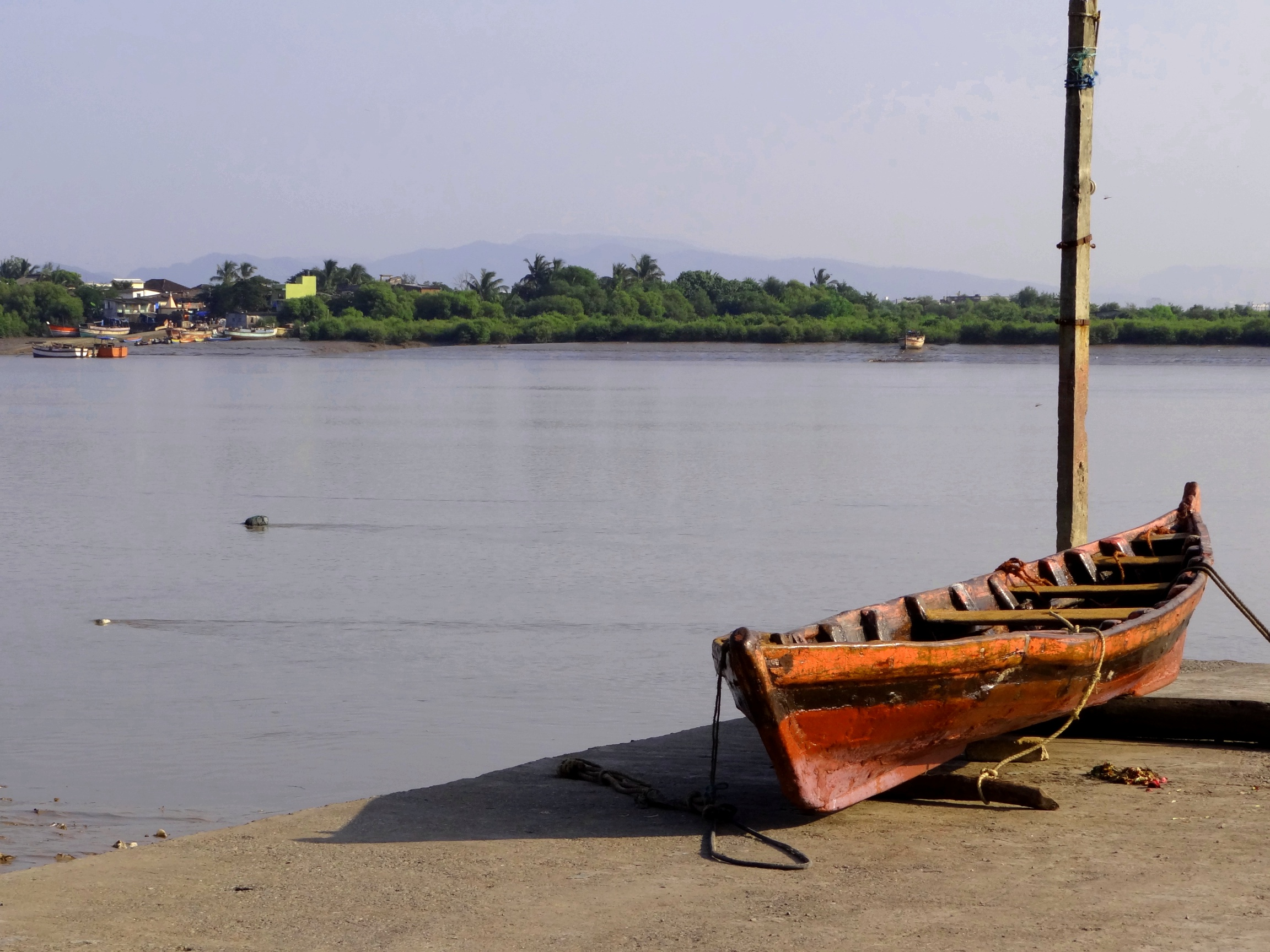
- Panju village seen to the left of the image as seen from Naigaon jetty
- Interactive map of Panju Island

Geography
- Coordinates: 19°20′00.9″N 72°51′03.3″E

Administration
- (India)

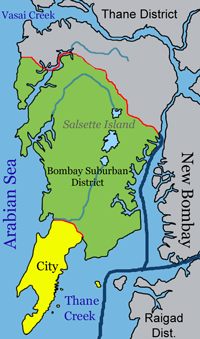
The island is just about visible to the north

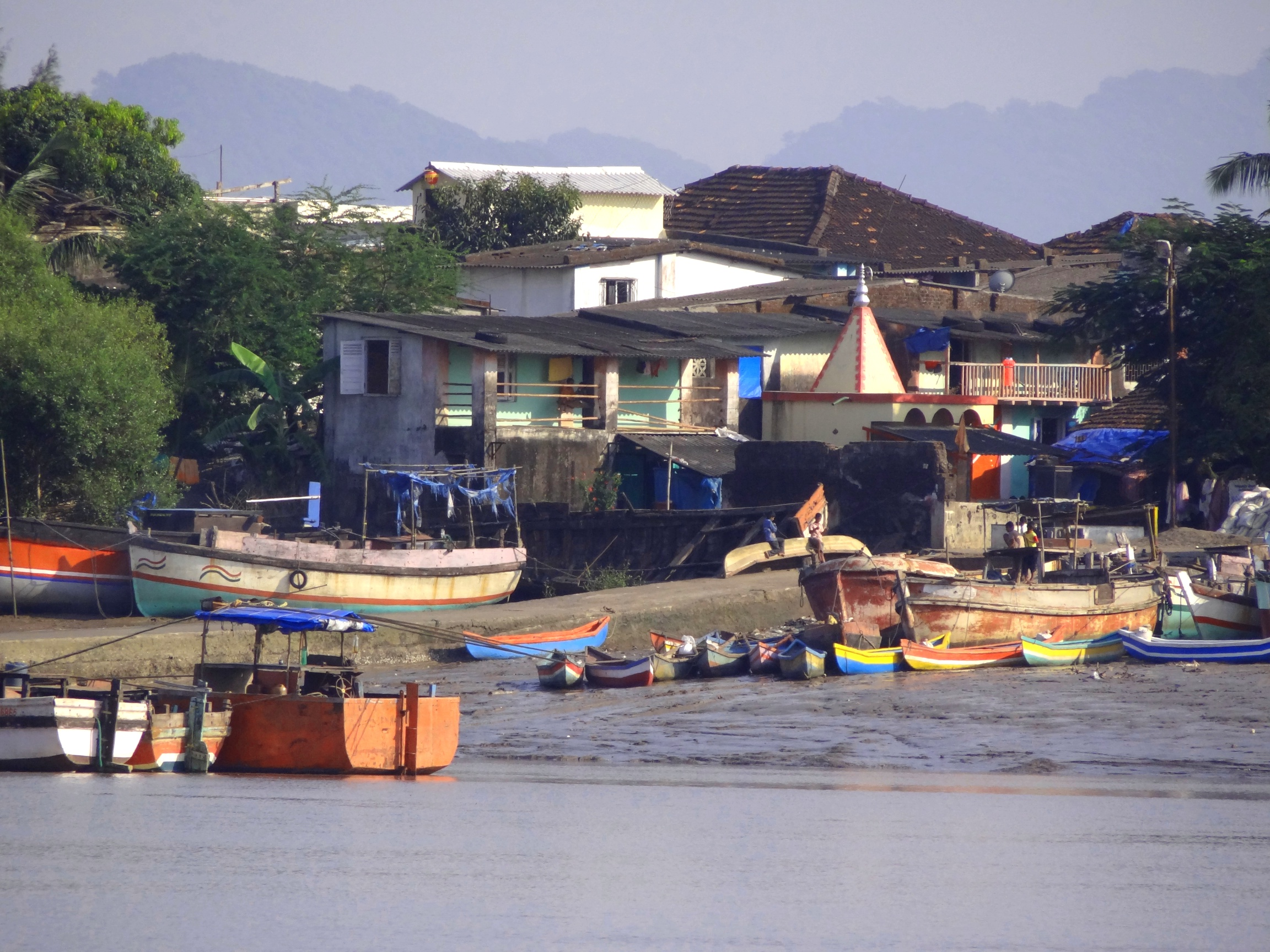
Village with the jetty

Panju Island is an estuarine island in the Vasai Creek just north of Mumbai, India. The island is used by the Western Railway to connect the island of Salsette with the mainland at Vasai. It is located at 19.333°N 72.85°E with a maximum elevation of 1 m (3 ft) .

== Early relations with railway ==
The Suburban line trains move over the island while passing through the Vasai Creek between Bhayandar and Naigaon. The creek is traversed by two railway bridges in two sections, Northern and Southern. One can also see another bridge, now unused, on the western side of the left bridge. This Bassein bridge was built between 1923 and 1926/1927 as a replacement to an existing bridge from 1864, which had become old and weak by then.

The original Bassein bridges were opened in 1864, the same year the first train service began from Grant Rd to Ahmedabad. They served for a while, after which they were found weak for the increasing loads. Hence between 1896 and 1902, it was deemed necessary to replace the bridges. The girders were strengthened, but still were unable to cope with the increasing traffic. Speed restrictions were imposed,15 mph for locals, and 8 mph for through trains.

Finally, preliminary construction works were started in the beginning of 1920, and the preparatory works were started in 1923 for a new bridge, 120 ft east of the old bridges. The design of the original 1864 bridge was kept. The work, though with delays, was completed soon after 1926. This is the old bridge seen today.

Panju Island was an important base of operations for the construction of that bridge, housing utilities like a stacking yard, power house, stores, etc. Further, it allowed the division of the construction into two segments, north and south from the island.

A 1924 BB&CI Magazine, about various bridges along the company line. See from pg. 3, for a description of the old Bassein bridges -

Panju was also listed as one of the stations on the first Suburban service of BB&CI, that commenced on 12 April 1867. A station of the island's name can also be seen in a train graph printed in a 1923 BB&CI Magazine. According to this, the station was in operation at least into the mid-1920s, and might have been demolished later. It is likely to be just a stopover with a cabin, rather than a full fledged station.

== See also ==
- Vasai Creek
- Thane Creek
- Salsette Island
- Mumbai
- Western Suburbs
- Eastern Suburbs
