= Vasai-Virar =

Vasai–Virar
- City; Mumbai Metropolitan Region
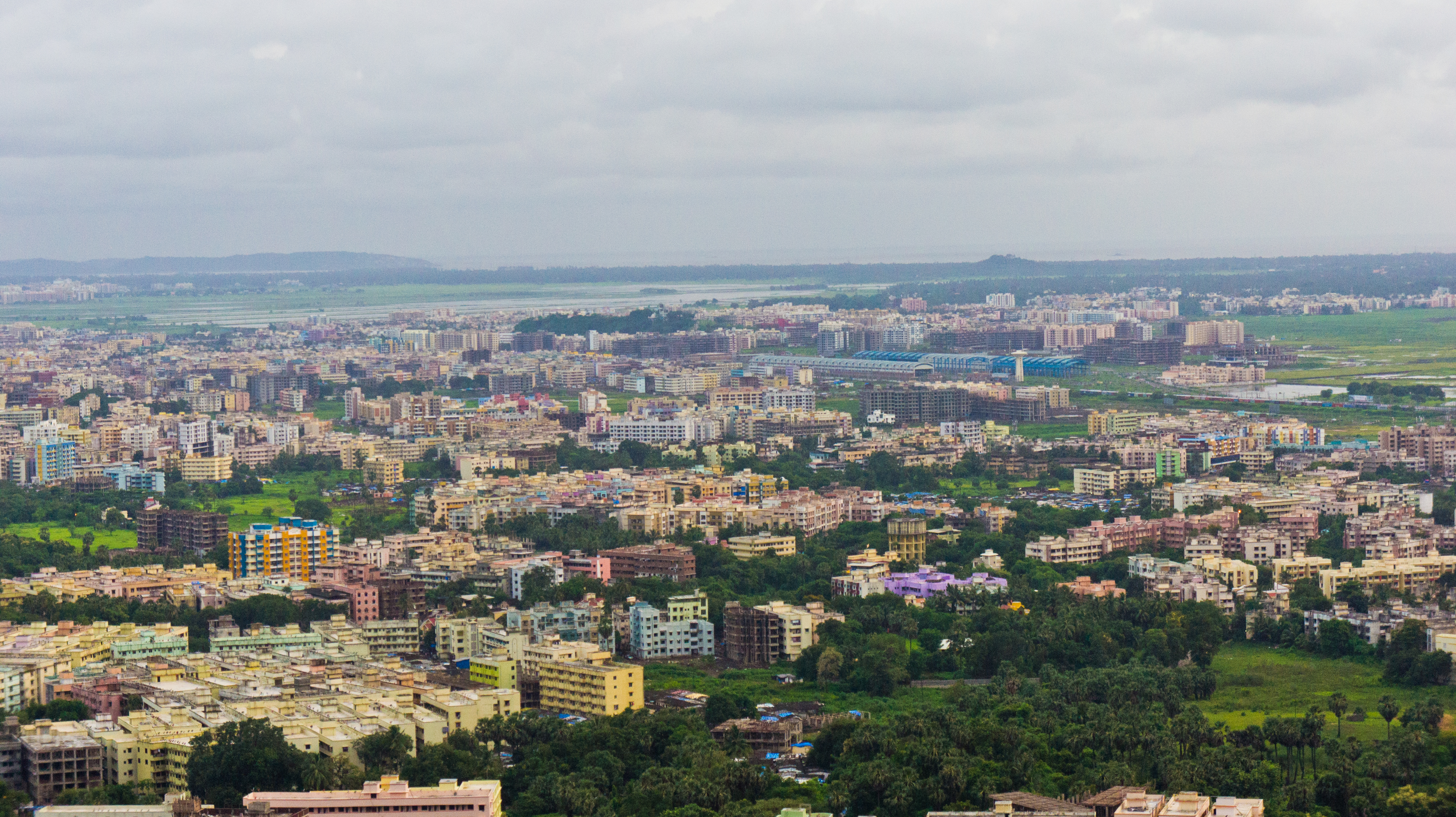
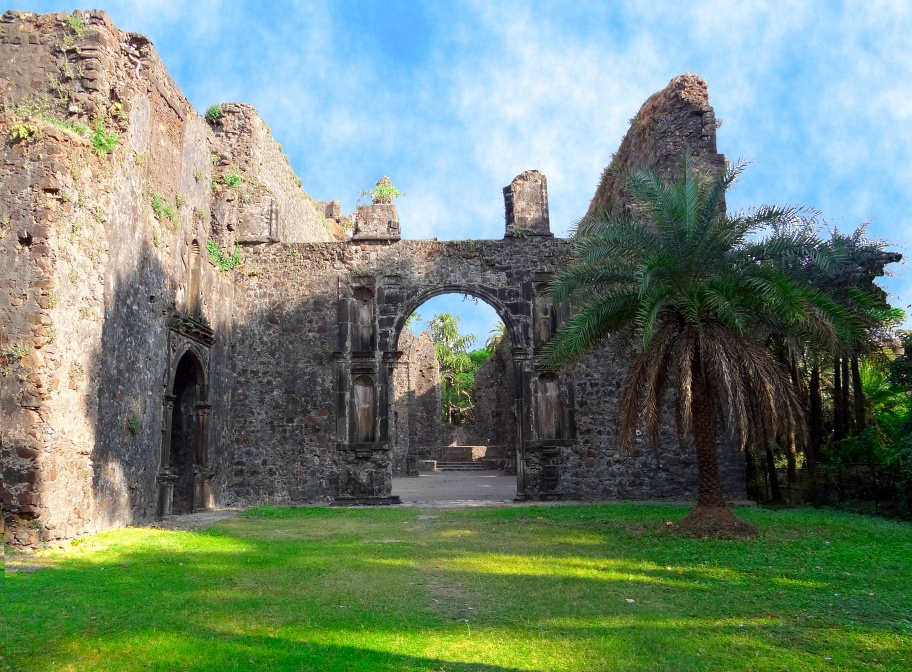
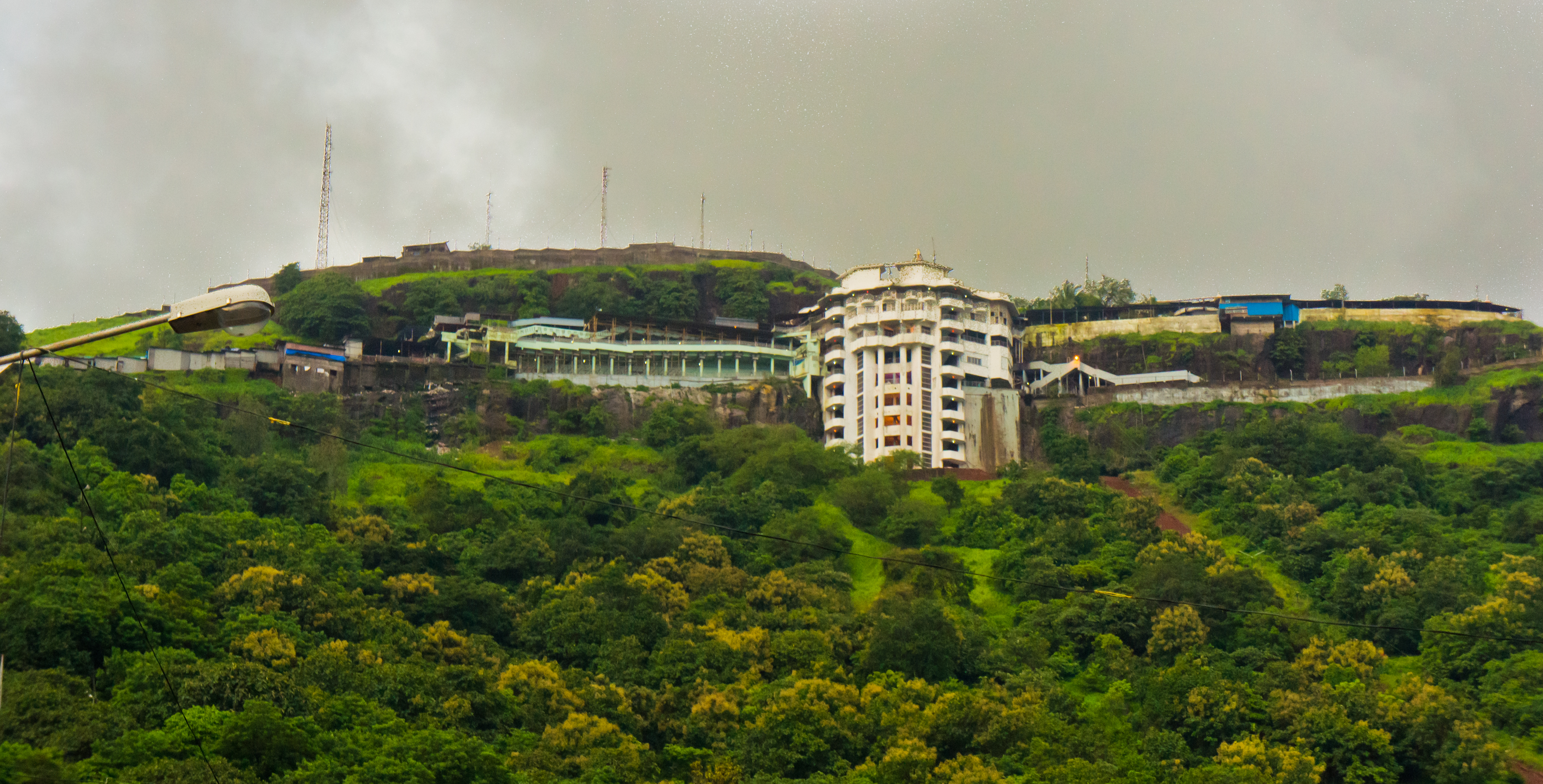
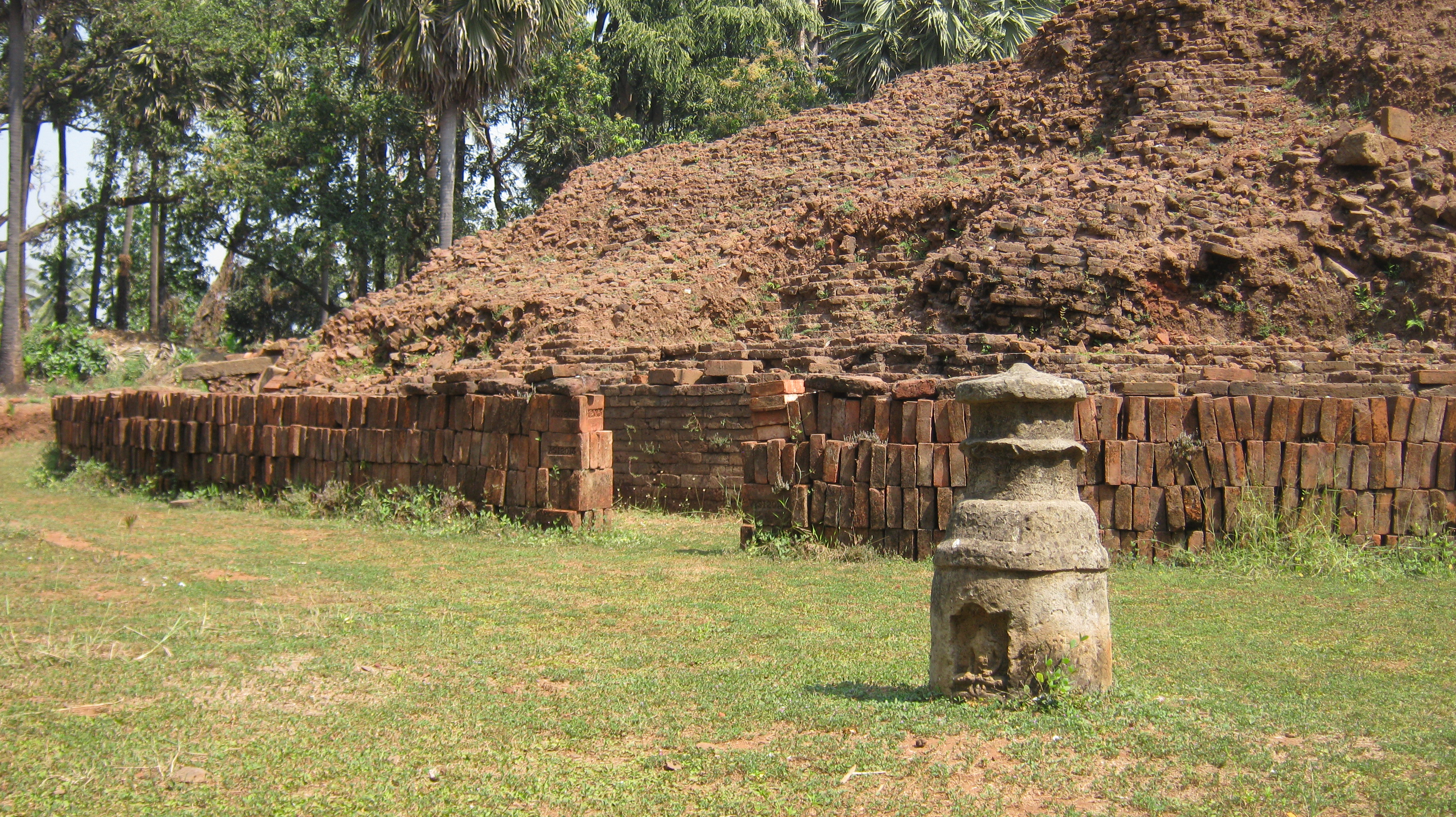
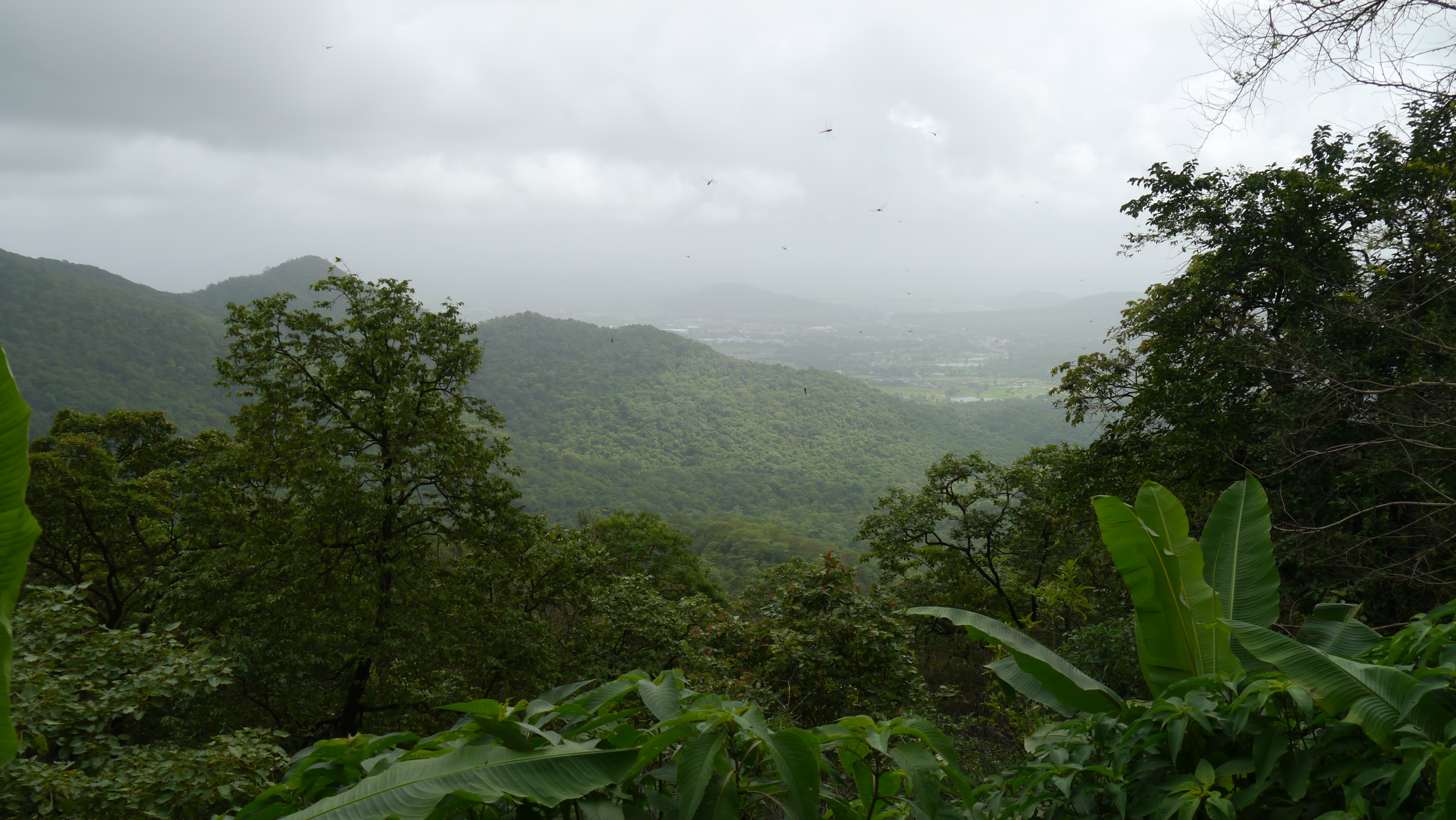
- Paronama of the city Vasai Fort Jivdani Temple Sopara Stupa Tungareshwar

- Location within Maharashtra
- Coordinates: 19.47°N 72.8°E
- Country: India
- State: Maharashtra
- District: Palghar

Government
  - Type: Municipal Corporation
  - Body: Vasai-Virar Municipal Corporation

Area
  - Total: 319.39 km^{2} (123.32 sq mi)
- Elevation: 11 m (36 ft)

Population (2011)
  - Total: 1,221,233
  - Density: 3,823.6/km^{2} (9,903.2/sq mi)

Languages
  - Official: Marathi
- Time zone: UTC+5:30 (IST)
- PINs: Virar; East - 401305, 401309; West - 401303 Nallasopara; East - 401209; West - 401203 Vasai Road; East - 401209; West - 401201, 401202 Naigaon; East - 401208; West - 401201, 401202, 401207
- Telephone code: 0250-XXX XXXX
- Vehicle registration: MH-48
- Sex ratio: 880 ♂/♀

Vasai-Virar is an agglomeration of four previously governed municipal councils: Vasai (Bassein), Virar, Nallasopara and Navghar-Manikpur, as well as a few towns to the East and West of the urban area. It lies in the Konkan division of Maharashtra, India.The twin city of Vasai-Virar is a part of the Mumbai Metropolitan Region (MMR) and Mira-Bhayander, Vasai-Virar Police Commissionerate.

According to the 2011 census, it is the fifth largest city in Maharashtra. Located near Mumbai city, it lies in Palghar District, North of Vasai Creek and South of the Vaitarna River. Vasai-Virar is bordered by Mira-Bhayandar and Thane on its South and Southeast, Bhiwandi-Nizampur on its East and Palghar Rural district on its North.

Vasai-Virar has several train stations. On the Western Line, it has Naigaon, Vasai Road, Nallasopara, Virar and Vaitarna train stations, whereas on the Central Line it has Juchandra and Kaman Road stations.

== History ==
Vasai-Virar, formerly Bassein or Vasai, is a city (municipal corporation) in western Maharashtra state, western India. It lies on the Arabian Sea coast, north of Mumbai (Bombay). Vasai town was part of the territory of the Hindu Devagiri Yadavas until 1317, and it later became a seaport for the Gujarat Muslim kings. In 1526, the Portuguese established a fort (now in ruins) and a trading station at Vasai, and the town became famous for its shipbuilding industry.

The Portuguese, with their naval power and their crusading valor, were unquestioned masters of the Indian Ocean. When the Portuguese arrived, Vasai was under the rule of Bahadur Shah, the Sultan of Gujarat.

On 23 December 1534, the Sultan of Gujarat, signed a treaty with the Portuguese and ceded Vasai, with its dependencies of Salsette, Mombaim (Bombay), Parel, Vadala, Siao (Sion), Vorli (Worli) (Worli fort photo), Mazagao (Mazgao), Thane, Bandra, Mahim, Caranja (Uran).

=== Vasai-Virar ===
In 2009, the town was joined administratively with neighboring Virar (north) and several dozen other surrounding communities to form the Vasai-Virar twin city, and it immediately became one of the most-populous urban areas in the state. The city has long been a large-scale fishing centre and a wholesale exporter of agricultural produce. Traditional industries include silk and cotton hand-loom weaving and salt manufacture. There has been a rise in construction and in technology-related activities (e.g., software development).

== Climate ==
Vasai-Virar has a tropical wet and dry climate (Köppen: Aw). This moderate climate consists of high rainfall days and very few days of extreme temperatures. 80% of total rainfall occurs between June and October. Annual rainfall averages 2,000–2,500 mm (79–98 in) and humidity is 61—86%, making it a humid-prehumid zone. The driest days are in winter, while the wettest days occur in July. In recent times, the area has become more flood prone due to rapid urbanization. The flooding, at times, cuts off the area from surrounding regions. Flooding has also affected transport, agriculture and industrial activities in the past.

Climate data for Vasai-Virar
Month	Jan	Feb	Mar	Apr	May	Jun	Jul	Aug	Sep	Oct	Nov	Dec	Year
Mean daily maximum °C (°F)	28.5 (83.3)	29 (84)	31 (88)	32.5 (90.5)	33.2 (91.8)	32 (90)	29.7 (85.5)	29.5 (85.1)	29.8 (85.6)	32.1 (89.8)	32 (90)	30.3 (86.5)	30.8 (87.5)
Daily mean °C (°F)	23.2 (73.8)	23.7 (74.7)	26.3 (79.3)	28.3 (82.9)	29.8 (85.6)	29 (84)	27.4 (81.3)	27.1 (80.8)	27 (81)	27.8 (82.0)	26.6 (79.9)	24.6 (76.3)	26.7 (80.1)
Mean daily minimum °C (°F)	17.9 (64.2)	18.5 (65.3)	21.6 (70.9)	24.2 (75.6)	26.5 (79.7)	26.1 (79.0)	25.1 (77.2)	24.7 (76.5)	24.3 (75.7)	23.6 (74.5)	21.2 (70.2)	18.9 (66.0)	22.7 (72.9)
Average precipitation mm (inches)	0 (0)	1 (0.0)	1 (0.0)	0 (0)	10 (0.4)	486 (19.1)	870 (34.3)	531 (20.9)	350 (13.8)	71 (2.8)	6 (0.2)	1 (0.0)	2,327 (91.5)
Source: Climate-Data.org (altitude: 5m)

== Demographics ==
Religion in Vasai-Virar (2011)
Religion	Percent
Hinduism	77.16%
Islam	9.03%
Christianity	8.28%
Buddhism	2.65%
Jainism	1.90%
Other or not stated	0.98%

As of the 2011 census official report, Vasai-Virar Municipal Corporation had 291,229 households and a population of 1,222,390. 147,102 (12.03%) were under the age of 7. Vasai-Virar had a sex ratio of 886 females per 1000 males and a literacy rate of 88.57% for those 7 years and above. Scheduled Castes and Scheduled Tribes made up 50,983 (4.17%) and 57,490 (4.70%) of the population respectively.

The population of Vasai-Virar city comprises many different religions. Among them, Hinduism is practiced by 943,165 people which makes up to 78.05% of the total population, which is below the national average of 80.5%.

Languages of Vasai-Virar (2011)
1. Marathi (46.5%)
2. Hindi (26.6%)
3. Gujarati (9.26%)
4. Bhojpuri (3.10%)
5. Urdu (2.72%)
6. Marwari (1.78%)
7. Malayalam (1.53%)
8. Bengali (1.38%)
9. Konkani (1.32%)
10. Kannada (1.00%)
11. Others (4.84%)

At the time of the 2011 Census of India, 46.49% of the population spoke Marathi, 26.58% Hindi, 9.26% Gujarati, 3.10% Bhojpuri, 2.72% Urdu, 1.78% Marwari, 1.53% Malayalam, 1.38% Bengali, 1.32% Konkani and 1.00% Kannada as their first language.

== Governance and politics ==
The Vasai–Virar urban town is governed by Vasai-Virar Municipal Corporation. The town was formed in 2009 when it was joined administratively with Virar and other surrounding communities. Vasai-Virar city has been separated from Greater Mumbai and Mira-Bhayandar City because of presence of Vasai Creek. VVCMC is declared as ”C” Class Municipal Corporation.

=== Civic administration ===
Vasai-Virar Municipal Corporation (VVMC) was formed on 3 July 2010. It is headed by a Municipal commissioner, Shri. Gangatharan D., an Indian Administrative Service officer. He wields the executive power. A quinquennial election is held to elect the governing body, who are responsible for overseeing that their constituencies have the basic civic infrastructure in place, and that there is no lacuna on the part of the authorities.

The position of mayor is a largely ceremonial post with limited duties but the office-holder heads the party with the largest vote. The current mayor of the city Shri. Narayan Mankar. The total number of electoral wards within the city jurisdiction is a 115.

=== Municipal finance ===
According to financial data published on the CityFinance Portal of the Ministry of Housing and Urban Affairs, the Vasai-Virar Municipal Corporation reported total revenue receipts of ₹1,308 crore (US$157 million) and total expenditure of ₹912 crore (US$110 million) in 2022–23. Tax revenue accounted for about 25.7% of the total revenue, while the corporation received ₹0.46 crore in grants during the financial year.

=== Civic services ===
Public Transport: The VVMT uses diesel powered buses for its operation. All buses with electronic display board are introduced in the fleet, which have destination with the route number flashing in Marathi as well as English on front of the buses. The VVMT bus routes are spread city-wide and also to neighboring cities. The VVMT operates inter-city services to three different areas beyond the municipal limits of Vasai-Virar city, i.e. into the limits of the Municipal Corporations of the cities of Mira-Bhayandar, Thane, and Mumbai.

Digital Services: The VVMC website provides information on grocery shops, ration shops, medical shops, and community kitchen lists. The website also includes list of eye and blood banks in the city. The website also holds minutes of general body meeting since 2015.

Water Supply: Laying of water pipeline in the Coastal Regulation Zone III area of Kaman river has been approved for the Surya dam water project. The Mumbai Metropolitan Region Development Authority is executing the 403 million litres daily project (MLD) that will bring an additional 54 MLD water supply to the Vasai-Virar region.

Citizen Engagement: A blog known as Vasai Virar Blog for local information is managed by few citizens and can be used by all. It provides information on various services provided in the city like ambulance service and their contact numbers, hospital location in the city and the nearest police station. In addition, information about schools and colleges in the area are also available.

== Transport ==
The city is well connected to Mumbai by Western Railway and through Mumbai-Ahmedabad National Highway. The city is connected to Navi Mumbai, Thane, Bhiwandi, Kalyan and Panvel node of Navi Mumbai city by the Vasai-Diva Railway line. Vasai-Virar city has significant growth potential due to close proximity to city-proper Mumbai.

=== Railways ===
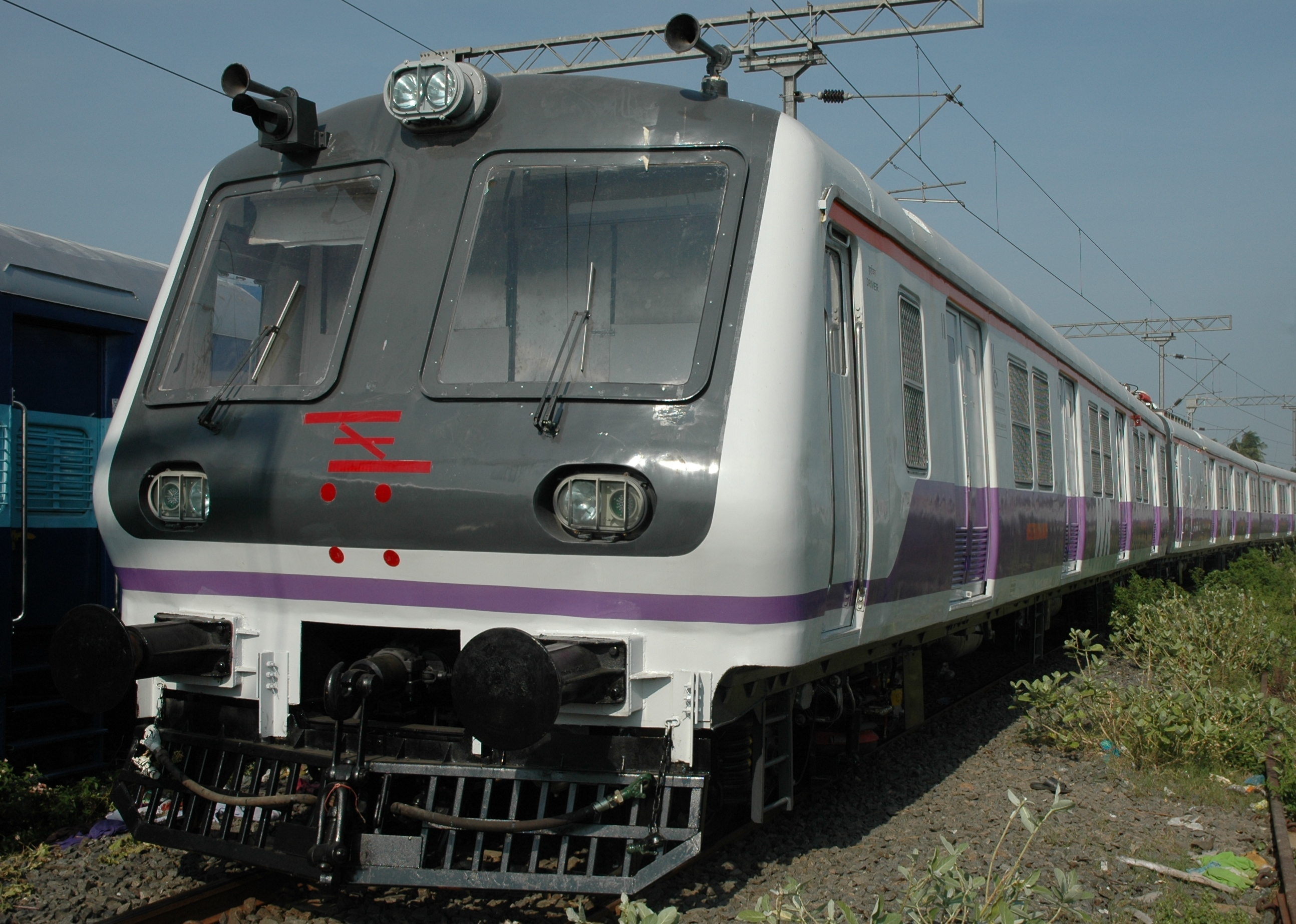
Mumbai Suburban Local Train

Vasai-Virar city is connected by the Western Railway and Central Railway. The major railway stations on the Western and Central Railway in Vasai–Virar city are:

- Virar railway station (Western Railway): All Local, MEMU, Shuttle, very few Express trains but all Passenger Trains halt or depart from here.
- Nala Sopara railway station (Western Railway): All Local & MEMU halt here.
- Vasai Road railway station (Western/Central Railway): Vasai Road Railway Station is a Junction. All Local, MEMU, Shuttle, Express trains but only which are coming from Bhiwandi side and all Passenger Trains halt or Depart from here.
- Naigaon railway station (Western Railway): All Local Trains halt here.
- Juchandra railway station (Central Railways): All MEMU local halt here.
- Kaman Road railway station (Central Railway): All MEMU local halt here.

=== Road ===
Marcopolo Bus

Mini Bus

Vasai-Virar City Municipal Corporation started its own transport service on 3 October 2012 in association with Bhagirathi Transport Corporation Pvt Ltd, known as VVMT. It operates a large number of bus lines in the Vasai-Virar city. VVMT also operates its buses in Vasai-Virar villages. It also has operation outside city limits into neighbouring city of Mira-Bhayandar, Thane, and Mumbai. VVMT bus ply from Vasai to Thane & Vasai to Mulund.

Other Towns & Cities where VVMT Buses connects
Mira-Bhayandar City
Thane City
Mumbai City

Information of VVMT Bus Routes & Bus Depot
No of Bus Routes	32
No of Depots	1 (Agarwal Nagar, Vasai East) 2 (Navghar, Vasai West)

Operations

The VVMT bus routes are spread town-wide and also to neighboring towns and cities. The VVMT operates inter-city services to three different areas beyond the municipal limits of Vasai-Virar Town, i.e. into the limits of the Municipal Corporations of Mira-Bhayandar, Thane, and Mumbai.

Vasai-Virar City
The local bus services of the city, which are operated by VVMC. The internal places of Vasai-Virar city which are far from the Virar, Nala Sopara, Vasai Road, Naigaon Railway Stations are connected by VVMT. The major concentration has always been Vasai-Virar city and with vast growing population in the city.

Vasai-Virar Villages
It is not official, but some faraway villages from the Virar, Nala Sopara, and Vasai are connected by VVMT buses. VVMT services are not so frequent in villages as in the city.

Mira-Bhayandar City
Services start from Virar, Nala Sopara and Vasai Road Railway Stations and passes by Bhayandar via Ghodbunder Road. The inter city connection between the Vasai-Virar city (which on the western railway side) and (which is on the central railway side).

Thane City
Thane City is connected to Vasai by the VVMT. From Vasai, it starts its services towards Thane. The inter city connection is between Vasai-Virar city (which is on the western railway side) and Thane City / Central Mumbai City (via Thane City) (which is on the central railway side).

Mumbai City
Brihanmumbai Electricity Supply and Transport (BEST) is the largest public transport provider in the Mumbai City & suburbs. VVMT connects the last station in Mumbai's suburb Mulund to the Vasai-Virar. The inter-city connection is between Vasai-Virar Town on the western railway side and Central Mumbai City on the central railway side.

== Sports ==
Sachin at Vasai-Virar Mayor's Marathon in 2014

Ritesh Deshmukh at Vasai-Virar Mayor's Marathon

=== Vasai-Virar Municipal Corporation Marathon ===
Vasai-Virar Municipal Corporation Marathon, formerly known as Vasai-Virar Mayor's Marathon is an annual marathon race organized in the Vasai-Virar area. It began in 2011 and in 2012 became a National Level running event, recognized by the AFI. The event sees participation in excess of 15,000 across various categories and offers prize money in excess of Rs 30 lakhs.

=== Swimming pool ===
The Municipal Corporation has built an Olympic-size Swimming Pool in Vasai & Virar.

=== District sports tournaments and Kala-Krida ===
The Vasai-Virar Municipal Corporation organises District level sports tournaments for various sports and Kala-Krida is a significant and popular annual event for Sports and Arts enthusiasts.
