= Navghar-Manikpur =

- city
- Location in Maharashtra, India
- Coordinates: 18.5183°N 72.9956°E
- Country: India
- State: Maharashtra
- District: Palghar

Population (2001)
  - Total: 116,700

Languages
  - Official: Marathi
- Time zone: UTC+5:30 (IST)

Navghar-Manikpur is a city and a municipal council in Palghar district in the Indian state of Maharashtra.

== Demographics ==
As of 2001 India census, Navghar-Manikpur had a population of 116,700. Males constituted 53% of the population and females 47%. Navghar-Manikpur has an average literacy rate of 83%, higher than the national average of 59.5%: male literacy is 85%, and female literacy is 81%. In Navghar-Manikpur, 11% of the population is under 6 years of age.

Among minority languages, Gujarati is spoken by 23.78% of the population and Hindi by 18.24%.
