= Vasai-Virar Municipal Corporation Marathon =

- Date: December
- Location: Vasai-Virar, Maharashtra, India
- Event type: Road
- Distance: Half Marathon, Marathon
- Established: 2011
- Website: https://vvmm.in/

The Vasai-Virar Municipal Corporation Marathon (VVMCM), formerly the Vasai-Virar Mayor's Marathon) is one of India's largest domestic road races. Held annually in December in Maharashtra, it attracts elite national athletes and offers some of the highest prize money for Indian runners.

Since its inception in 2011, the event has grown in scale and reputation, regularly drawing over 20,000 participants and gaining media coverage in national sports publications.

== Events ==
=== Full Marathon ===
The Full Marathon (42.195 km) starts from Viva College (Virar, West) and also finishes at Viva College. Free transport facilities are available from Virar railway station for all Full Marathon participants.

=== Half Marathon ===
The Half Marathon (21.097 km) starts from outside the Vasai Tahsildar Office, Opp. Vasai Court, Vasai Village will finishes at Viva College. Free Transport facilities to the start point is available from outside Vasai Road railway station.

=== Open Run ===
The Open Run (11km & 5km) Starts from Viva College (Virar West) and also finishes at Viva College.
