= Vasai Creek =

Vasai Creek वसई खाडी
- Creek
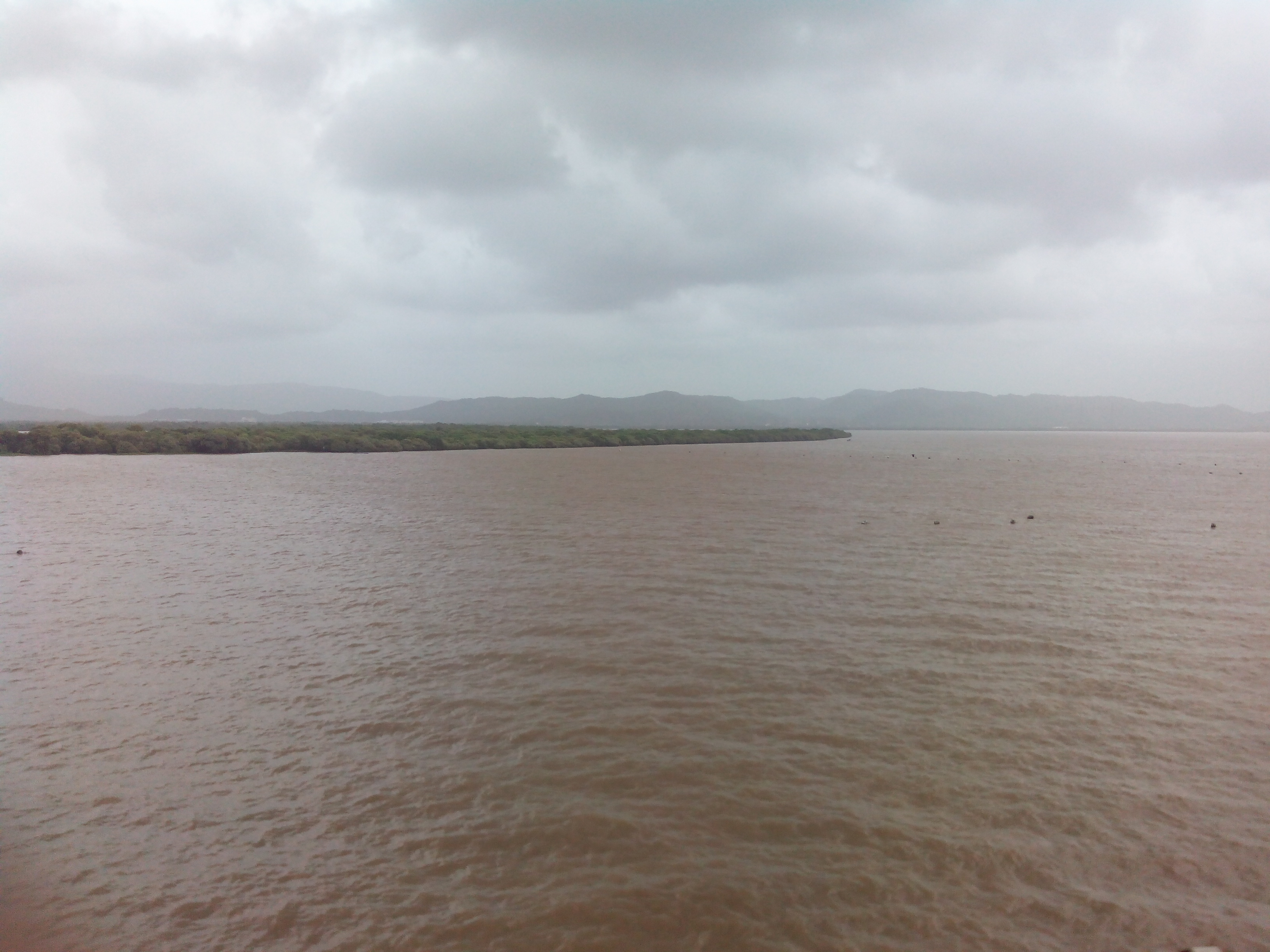
- Vasai Creek

- Location within Maharashtra
- Coordinates: 19.315°N 72.875°E
- Country: India
- State: Maharashtra
- District: Thane
- Named for: Vasai

Languages
  - Official: Marathi
- Time zone: UTC+5:30 (IST)

Vasai Creek, previously Bassein Creek, is an estuary and one of the two main distributaries of the Ulhas River, in the Konkan division of Maharashtra, India. The Ulhas splits at the northeast corner of Salsette island into its two main distributaries, the other one being the Thane Creek, both of which empty into the Arabian Sea. The creek forms the northern boundary of Salsette island and separates the island from mainland of Konkan. It gets its name from the city of Vasai, previously Bassein, located on the northern bank of the creek.

== Islands ==
Numerous islands are located in Vasai Creek such as Panju Island, two small islands just south of Panju islands, and Dharavi Island.

== Railway bridges ==
The Vasai Creek Railway Bridge is the oldest rail bridge constructed on this creek. The bridge lies between Bhayandar and Naigaon. The bridge was originally opened on 28 November 1864. It was rebuilt in the 1920s, which is the structure visibIe today. It has two sections, (as the Panju Island in middle) a smaller section and a longer section both made up of steel girders. This bridge is no longer functional and exists as a heritage structure. Two new parallel railway bridges were built to the east and are since operational.

== Road bridges ==
The Vasai Creek Road Bridge is one of the oldest road bridge constructed on this creek. It connects Ghodbunder and Naigaon. A newer parallel road bridge is constructed recently and is also operational.

Kasheli bridge is another old road bridge constructed over Vasai creek, at its very start, just near Thane. It connects Thane to Kasheli. It was built in late nineteenth century. A new Kasheli bridge was built recently, but over Ulhas river and it bypasses Kasheli and directly connects Thane to Mankoli.
