= State Highway 266 (Maharashtra) =

Road in Maharashtra, India

State Highway 266

Route information
- Maintained by MSRDC
- Length: 105 km (65 mi)

Major junctions
- North end: Gondia, Gondia
- South end: Sironcha, Gadchiroli

Location
- Country: India
- State: Maharashtra
- Districts: Gondia, Gadchiroli
- Primary destinations: Gondia, Kohamara, Arjuni Morgaon, Wadsa

Highway system
- Roads in India; Expressways; National; State; Asian; State Highways in Maharashtra

Maharashtra State Highway 266 (SH266) is a major state highway in Gondia, in the state of Maharashtra. The state highway connects Gondia, Kohamara, Arjuni Morgaon and Wadsa.

== Major Junction ==
This highway is one of the important highway which directly connected with

- National Highway 753 (India)
- National Highway 53 (India)
- National Highway 543 (India)
- National Highway 353C (India)

== See also ==
- List of state highways in Maharashtra
