= National Highway 753 (India) =

National Highway in India

National Highway 753
- Map of the National Highway in red

Route information
- Auxiliary route of NH 53
- Length: 248 km (154 mi)

Major junctions
- East end: Savner
- West end: Arjuni Morgaon

Location
- Country: India
- States: Maharashtra
- Primary destinations: Savner, Ramtek, Tumsar, Tirora, Gondia, Navegaon National Park, Arjuni Morgaon

Highway system
- Roads in India; Expressways; National; State; Asian
← NH 53	→ NH 47

National Highway 753, commonly referred to as NH 753 is a Major Highway in Maharashtra, India. It connected with Major Cities as Savner, Tumsar, Tirora, Gondia, Arjuni Morgaon and Others Villages Goregaon, Gondia, Sadak Arjuni and one of Important National Park Navegaon National Park which is Famous Tourists Attractions for Peoples in India.

== Route ==
NH-753 connects Arjuni Morgaon, Navegaon National Park, Kohmara, Goregaon, Gondia, Gondia, Tirora, Tumsar, Ramtek and Saoner in the state of Maharashtra.

== Junctions ==
NH 44 near Mansar.
NH 47 near Savner.
NH 53 near Kohmara.
NH 247 near Ramtek.
NH 543 near Gondia.

== See also ==
- List of national highways in India
- List of national highways in India by state
