= Central Deccan Plateau dry deciduous forests =

Coordinates: 16.0000°N 79.0000°E

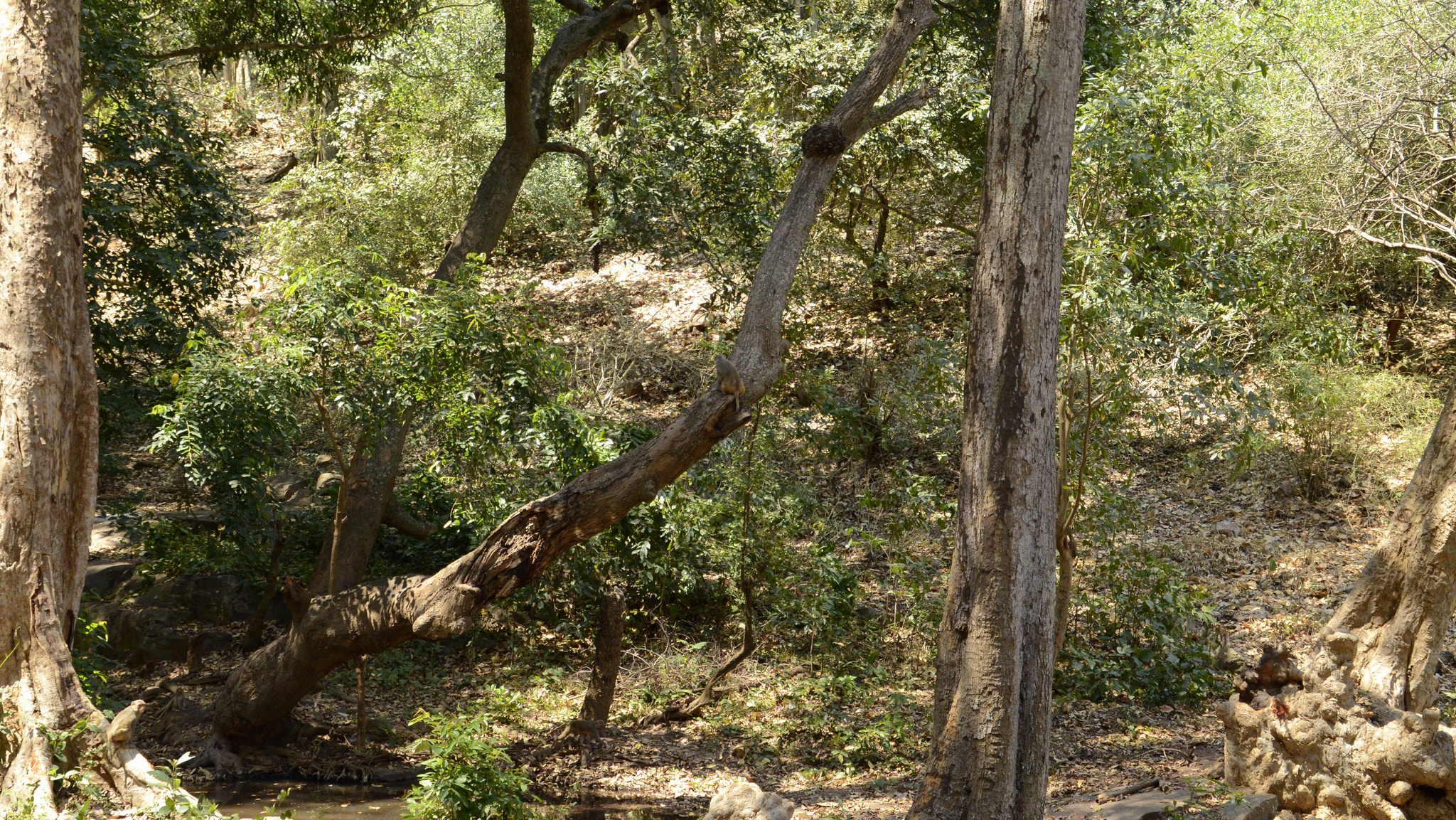
- Nallamalla forests at Srisailam

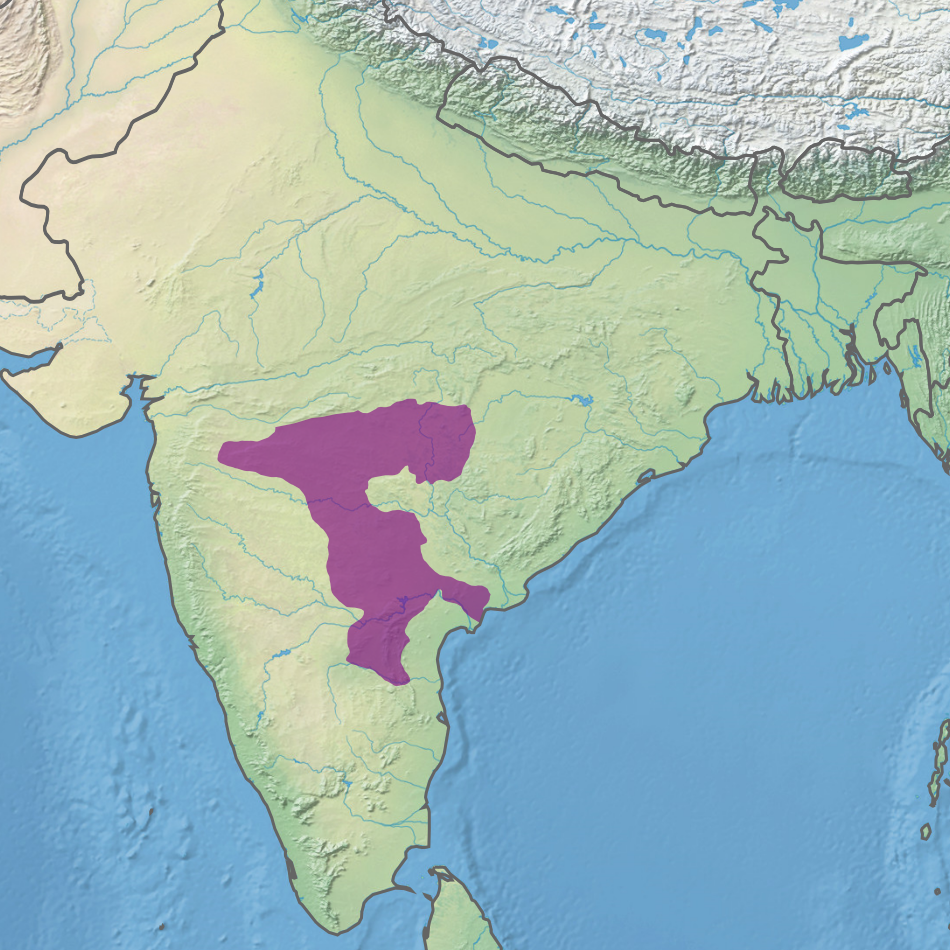
- Ecoregion territory (in purple)

Ecology
- Realm: Indomalayan
- Biome: tropical and subtropical dry broadleaf forests
- Borders: Deccan thorn scrub forests; Eastern Highlands moist deciduous forests, Narmada Valley dry deciduous forests

Geography
- Area: 239,376 km^{2} (92,424 sq mi)
- Country: India
- States: Maharashtra; Telangana; Madhya Pradesh; Chhattisgarh, Andhra Pradesh

Conservation
- Conservation status: critical/endangered
- Protected: 9,742 km^{2} (4%)

The Central Deccan Plateau dry deciduous forests in Western and Southern India, containing large protected areas of natural tiger habitat.

== Distribution ==
The Deccan Plateau is a large triangular plateau in southern India, bounded by the Western Ghats range to the west, the Eastern Ghats to the east, and the western Satpura Range to the north. The Central Deccan Plateau dry deciduous forests occupy an area of 240,200 square kilometers (92,700 sq mi), in which the dominant natural habitat is or was woodland of Hardwickia binata and Albizia amara trees, located on the central and southern portion of the plateau. The ecoregion lies mostly within the states of Maharashtra and Telangana, extending into adjacent parts of Madhya Pradesh, Chhattisgarh, and Andhra Pradesh. In Maharashtra, the Central Deccan Plateau dry deciduous forests cover most of the Vidarbha region, including the city of Nagpur. In Telangana, the dry deciduous forests cover much of the state, including Hyderabad, the state capital, with a small portion extending across the Eastern Ghats to the Bay of Bengal in Krishna District of Andhra Pradesh.

Typically the plateau extends from the Konkan Deccan divide north of Pune to the Krishna river in Telangana. Majority of the geology of the region is of Basaltic rocks which harbor a very different drainage pattern and different forest cover with an average mature tree height of over 10 metres (33 ft), while the granitoid region that is primarily affluent across Telangana and parts of Karnataka covers scrub jungle with an average tree height of around 5 metres (16 ft). A small part of Nallamala hill range that encompass the Amrabad Tiger Reserve and Srisailam Tiger Reserves are sedimentary rock scapes with dry thick vegetation and added to the ecoregion. All three forests have many uniquely different landscapes, easily visible, within this unique ecoregion. For example in the granitoid region, tigers, jackals, wild dogs and wolves are all extinct, while the peninsular rock agama is only found here.

The xeric Deccan thorn scrub forests lie to the west, south, and southeast, covering the drier portions of the plateau in the rain shadow of the Western Ghats. The more humid Eastern Highlands moist deciduous forests lie to the northeast and east, while the Narmada Valley dry deciduous forests lie across the Satpuras to the northwest.

The Godavari River crosses the ecoregion from its source in the Western Ghats and indeed most of the rivers on the plateau drain east towards the Bay of Bengal, with the exception of the Tapti River in the northwestern corner of the plateau, which drains westward into the Arabian Sea.

This is a highly populated area and most of the natural forest in the ecoregion has been cleared for firewood or grazing land or as a result of river damming, all of which are ongoing. However large blocks of original habitat such as the Nagarjunsagar-Srisailam Tiger Reserve in Telangana and Andhra Pradesh do remain.

== Flora ==
Woodlands of Hardwickia binata and Albizia amara are the characteristic plant community of this ecoregion, distinguishing it from the predominantly teak (Tectona grandis) or sal (Shorea robusta) woodlands found elsewhere in the Deccan. The Central Deccan forests have an upper canopy at 15–25 metres (49–82 ft), and an understory at 10–15 metres (33–49 ft), with little undergrowth. The Hardwickia trees lose their leaves during the winter dry season, and leaf out again in April.

Other tree species in the northern part of the ecoregion include:

- Boswellia serrata
- Lannea coromandelica
- Anogeissus latifolia
- Albizia lebbeck
- Lagerstroemia parviflora (syn. L. parvifolia)
- Diospyros exculpta
- Acacia catechu

== Fauna ==
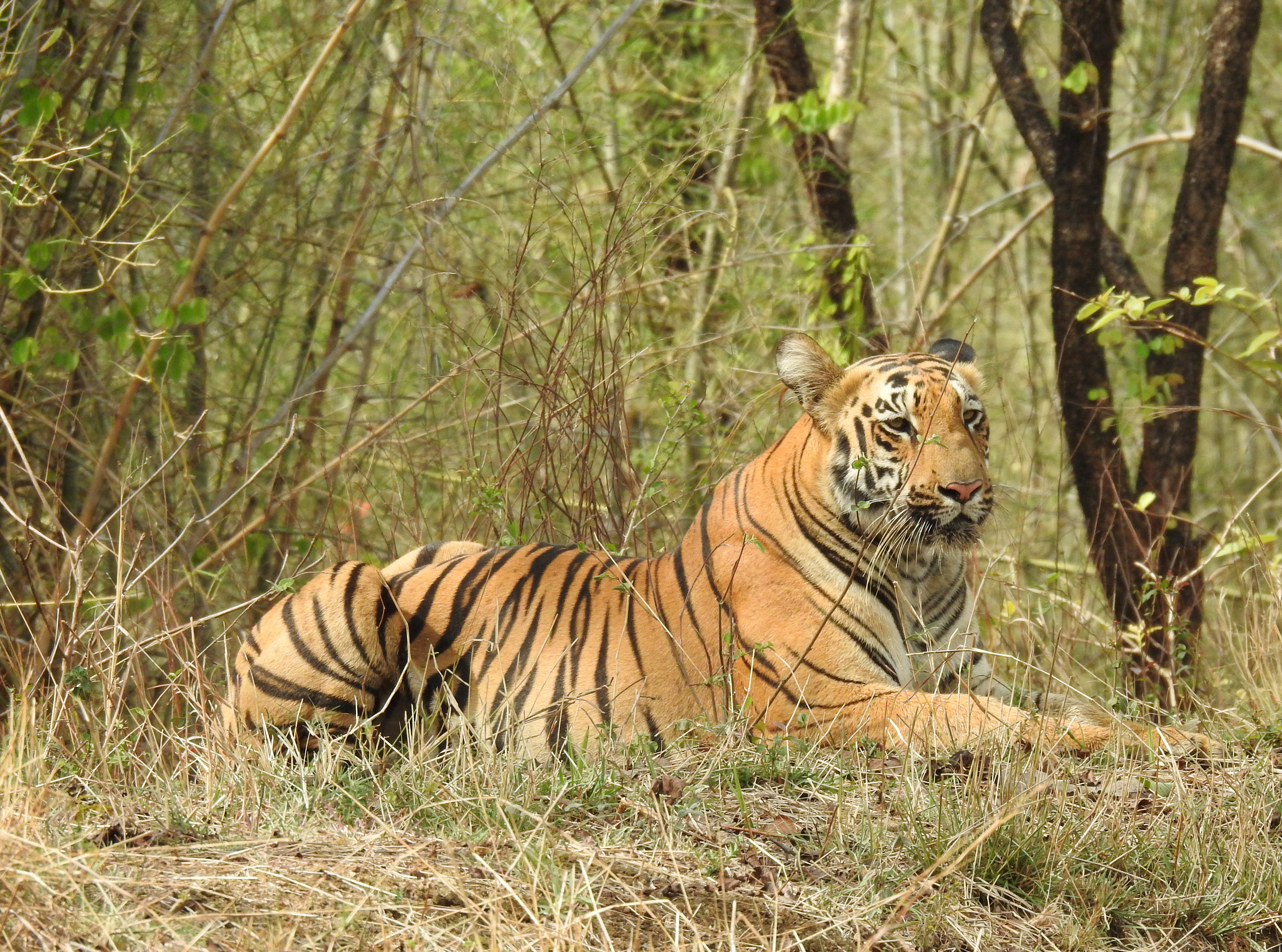
Bengal tiger at the Tadoba Andhari Tiger Reserve

The large areas of remaining forest on the plateau are still home to a variety of grazing animals from the four-horned antelope (Tetracerus quadricornis), chinkara (Gazella bennettii), and blackbuck (Antilope cervicapra) to the large gaur and wild water buffalo (Bubalus arnee).

Large carnivores include:

- Bengal tigers (Panthera tigris tigris)
- the dhole (wild dog, Cuon alpinus)
- the sloth bear (Melursus ursinus)

The area is home to nearly ninety mammal species. Some of the larger species mentioned above are rare, as is the threatened Indian giant squirrel (Ratufa indica). The 300 species of birds include the globally threatened Jerdon's courser (Rhinoptilus bitorquatus), which was rediscovered in 1986 having been thought extinct for nearly a hundred years. Other birds include bush quails (genus Perdicula), white-browed fantail and painted spurfowl.

== Conservation ==
About 80 percent of the natural habitat in the ecoregion has been lost. Several blocks of habitat larger than 5,000 square kilometres (1,900 sq mi) remain. Fifteen protected areas cover almost three percent of the ecoregion's area, with Nagarjunsagar-Srisailam Tiger Reserve the largest.

Protected areas within the dry deciduous forest ecoregion of the Central Deccan Plateau
Name	Area in km^{2} (sq mi)	District(s)	State(s)
Bor Wildlife Sanctuary	80 (31)	Wardha	Maharashtra
Chaprala Wildlife Sanctuary	130 (50)	Gadchiroli	Maharashtra
Gautala Autramghat Sanctuary	260 (100)	Aurangabad; Jalgaon	Maharashtra
Katepurna Wildlife Sanctuary	420 (160)	Akola	Maharashtra
Nagzira Wildlife Sanctuary	150 (58)	Bhandara; Gondia	Maharashtra
Navegaon National Park	170 (66)	Gondia	Maharashtra
Painganga Wildlife Sanctuary	130 (50)	Yavatmal	Maharashtra
Pench National Park	440 (170)	Seoni; Chhindwara	Madhya Pradesh
Gundla Brahmeswaram Wildlife Sanctuary	120 (46)	Kurnool; Prakasam	Andhra Pradesh
Kolleru Wildlife Sanctuary (Note: Lies partly in the Eastern Highlands moist deciduous forests ecoregion)	220 (85)		Andhra Pradesh
Kawal Tiger Reserve	160 (62)	Komaram Bheem Asifabad	Telangana
Manjira Wildlife Sanctuary	30 (12)	Medak district	Telangana
Pocharam Wildlife Sanctuary	120 (46)	Medak district	Telangana
Nagarjunsagar-Srisailam Tiger Reserve	3,721 (1,437) (Note: There is an additional muti-use buffer zone of 2,216 km^{2} (856 sq mi), giving an overall land area for the reserve of 5,837 km^{2} (2,254 sq mi).)		Telangana
Nagarjunsagar-Srisailam Tiger Reserve	3,721 (1,437)		Andhra Pradesh

== See also ==
- List of ecoregions in India
- Arid Forest Research Institute (AFRI)
