= Dhammagiri =

Dhammagiri Dhammagiri
- Town

Dhammagiri is an area of Amgaon taluka, in the Gondia district of Maharashtra, India. It is approx 1–2 km from Amgaon, on Deori Road. It is a hilly area, and has a Buddha statue on top of the hill. On Makar Sankranti, a Buddhism fair is also celebrated every year.
