= Sadak-Arjuni taluka =

Taluka in Arjuni Morgaon Subdivision of Gondiya district, Maharashtra, India

Sadak Arjuni Taluka
- Taluka
- Sadak-Arjuni Taluka Location in Gondia district (MH), India
- Country: India
- State: Maharashtra
- District: Gondia district
- Headquarters: Sadak Arjuni Town

Area
  - Total: 651.42 km^{2} (251.51 sq mi)

Population (2011)
  - Total: 115,594
  - Density: 177.45/km^{2} (459.59/sq mi)

Demographics
  - Literacy rate: 75.88 %
  - Sex ratio: 986

Sadak-Arjuni is a taluka in Arjuni Morgaon subdivision of Gondiya district, Maharashtra, India It is one of the eight Talukas located in Gondia district.

== Culture ==
The Mama-Bhasha fair is held in the villages of Satalwada (Sakoli taluka) and Giroli-Heti belonging to Sadak-Arjuni taluka. The fair is held on 1 and 2 January. In 2011, this fair was attended by 1 lakh persons.

Year	Male	Female	Total Population	Change	Religion (%)							
Year	Male	Female	Total Population	Change	Hindu	Muslim	Christian	Sikhs	Buddhist	Jain	Other religions and persuasions	Religion not stated
2001	54000	53493	107493	-	86.825	1.228	0.038	0.033	10.270	0.031	1.504	0.071
2011	58201	57393	115594	7.536	87.194	1.517	0.075	0.074	9.794	0.073	0.682	0.592
