= Geography of Maharashtra =

Map of Maharashtra

The word Maharashtra, the land of the mainly Marathi-speaking people, appears to be derived from Maharashtri, an old form of Prakrit. Some believe that the word indicates that it was the land of the Mahars and the Rattas, while others consider it to be a corruption of the term 'Maha Kantara' (the Great Forest), a synonym for 'Dandakaranya'. Maharashtra is the third largest state (in area) in India after Rajasthan and Madhya Pradesh. It covers an area of 307,713 km^{2} and is bordered by the states of Madhya Pradesh to the north, Chhattisgarh to the east, Telangana to the southeast, Karnataka to the south and Goa to the southwest. The state of Gujarat lies to the northwest, with the Union territory of Dadra and Nagar Haveli sandwiched between the borders. Maharashtra has coastline of 720 km.The Arabian Sea makes up Maharashtra's west coast. Maharashtra consists of two major relief divisions. The plateau is a part of the Deccan tableland and the Konkan coastal strip abutting on the Arabian Sea.

== Landscape ==
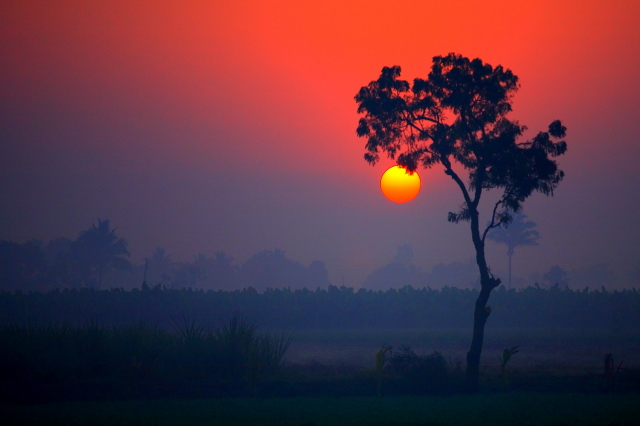
Bhigwan

Located in the heart of India, with a command of the Arabian Sea through its port of Mumbai, Maharashtra has a remarkable physical homogeneity, enforced by its underlying geology. The dominant physical trait of the state is its plateau character; Maharashtra's western part of the coastal plains, western upturned rims rising to form the Sahyadri Range, and its slopes gently descending towards the east and southeast. The major rivers and their master tributaries have carved the plateau into alternating broad-river valleys and intervening higher-level interfluves, such as the Ahmednagar, Buldana, and Yavatmal plateau.

The Sahyadri Range is the physical backbone of Maharashtra. Rising on an average to an elevation of 1000m. it falls in steep cliffs, to the Konkan on the west. Eastwards, the hill country falls in steps through a transitional area known as Maval to the plateau level. The series of crowning plateaux on the crest forms a distinctive feature of the Sahyadri Range.

The Konkan, lying between the Arabian Sea and the Sahyadri Range is narrow coastal lowland, barely 50 km wide. Though mostly below 200 m., it is far from being a plain country. Highly dissected and broken, the Konkan alternates between narrow, steep-sided valleys and low laterite plateaux.

The Satpuras, hills along the northern border, and the Bhamragad-Chiroli-Gaikhuri Ranges on the eastern border form physical barriers preventing easy movement, but also serve as natural limits to the state and has serve many earthquakes, such as in district Latur.

== Geology and topography ==
Except around Mumbai, and along the eastern limits, the State of Maharashtra presents a monotonously uniform, flat-topped skyline. This topography of the state is the outcome of its geological structure. The state area, barring the extreme eastern Vidarbha region, parts of Kolhapur and Sindhudurg in the west, is practically co-terminous with the Deccan Traps. Roughly 60 to 90 million years ago, the outpouring of basic lava through fissures formed horizontally bedded basalt over large areas. Variations in their composition and structure have resulted in massive, well-jointed steel-grey cliff faces alternating with structural benches (abandoned narrow stepped and rocky paleo-channel of rivers) of vesicular amygdaloid lava and ash layers, all of which contribute to the pyramid-shaped hills and crest-level plateau or mesas (flat sedimentary rock overlaid by harder rock).

Earth sculpturing under the tropical climate completed the panorama-sharply defining the landform features in the semi-arid conditions, and rounding the hilltops by the water erosion. Fluvial action by the Krishna, Bhima, Godavari, Tapi-Purna and Wardha-Wainganga river systems has further aided in the compartmentalisation of the land into broad, open river valleys, alternating with plateau interfluves, that form the ribs of the Sahyadrian backbone. In sharp contrast, the hill torrents of the Konkan, barely a 100 km long, tumble down as roaring streams which flow in deeply entrenched valleys to terminate in tidal estuaries. Apart from mainly occurring rock Basalt; other rocks like- Laterites are found in coastal humid and tropical region. Granite, Granite gneiss, Quartzite, Conglomerates are found exposed in the basement regions of Konkan rivers. Nanded is another region where pink Granites are found. Maharashtra has rich ore deposits. Kamti of Nagpur region is famous for Coal deposits of Gondwana era.

== Climate ==
The state enjoys a tropical monsoon climate; the hot scorching summer(40 to 48 degrees Celsius) from March onwards yields to the rainy monsoon in early June. The rich green cover of the monsoon season persists during the mild winter that follows through an unpleasant October transition, but turns into a dusty, barren brown as the summer sets in again. The seasonal rains from the western sea-clouds are very heavy and the rainfall is over 400 cm., on the Sahyadrian crests. The Konkan on the windward side is also endowed with heavy rainfall, declining northwards. East of the Sahyadri, the rainfall diminishes to a meagre 75 cm. in the western plateau districts, with Solapur-Ahmednagar lying in the heart of the dry zone. The rains increase slightly, later in the season, eastwards in the Marathwada and Vidarbha regions.Usually rain comes in 10 June in Maharashtra.

The highly pulsatory character of the monsoon, with its short spells of rainy weather and long dry breaks, floods, as well as droughts add much to the discomfort of the rural economy.

== Resources ==
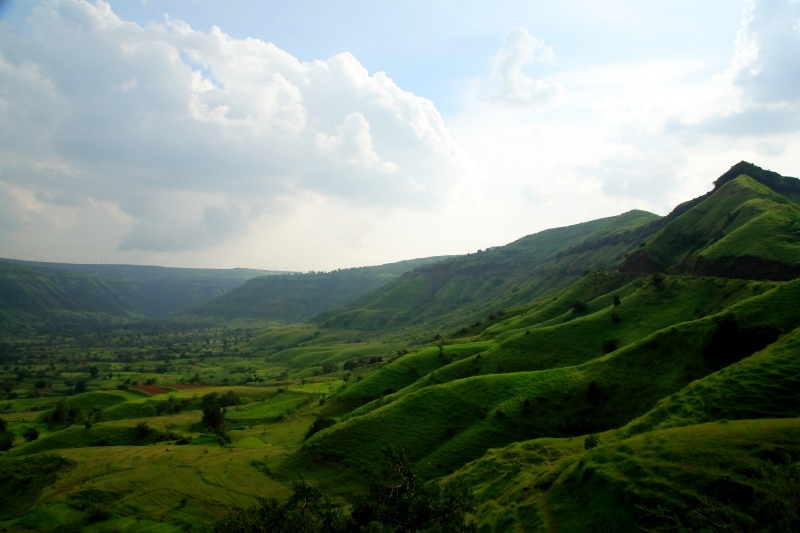
Satara Mountains

Forests comprising only 17% of the state area cover the eastern region and the Sahyadri Range, while open scrub jungle dots the plateaux. If Maharashtra represented the Maha Kantara in the historic past, today little of it is left; vast sections have been denuded and stripped of the vegetal cover.

The soils of Maharashtra are residual, derived from the underlying basalts. In the semi-dry plateau, the regur (black-cotton soil) is clayey, rich in iron, but poor in nitrogen and organic matter; it is moisture-retentive. Where redeposited along the river valleys, those kali soils are deeper and heavier, better suited for rabi crops. Farther away, with a better mixture of lime, the morand soils form the ideal Kharif zone. The higher plateau areas have pathar (rock)soils, which contain more gravel. In the rainy Konkan, and the Sahyadri Range, the same basalts give rise to the brick-red laterites productive under a forest-cover, but readily stripped into a sterile varkas when the vegetation is removed. By and large, soils of Maharashtra are shallow and somewhat poor everywhere .

Water is the most precious natural resource of the state, greatly in the demand, and most unevenly distributed. A large number of villages lack drinking water, especially during the summer months, even in the wet Konkan. Barely 11% of the net sown area is irrigated. Perched water tables in the basalt aquifers have contributed to increased well irrigation, which accounts for approximately 55% of the irrigable water. The granitic-gneissic terrain in the eastern hilly area of Vidarbha accounts for all tank irrigation. Tube-wells in the Tapi-Purna alluvium and shallow wells in the coastal sands are the other main sources of water. Special wells are being made by the Government for the villages lacking water.

The mineral-bearing zones of Maharashtra lie beyond the area of the basalts in eastern Vidarbha, southern Kolhapur and the Sindhudurg area. The Chandrapur, Gadchiroli, Bhandara and Nagpur Districts form the main mineral belt, with coal and manganese as the major minerals and iron ore and limestone as potential wealth. The Ratnagiri coast contains sizeable deposits of illimenite.

== Protected areas ==
As of 2017 there were 537 wildlife sanctuaries in India and 41 in Maharashtra. wildlife sanctuaries, national parks and Project Tiger reserves have been created in Maharashtra, with the aim of conserving the rich bio-diversity of the region. As of 2017, India has 103 national parks, of which six are located in Maharashtra. There are 50 Tiger reserve in India and 6 project tiger areas in Maharashtra. viz Tadoba-Andhari, Melghat, Nagazira, Sahyadri, Bor and Pench. A large percentage of Maharashtra's forests and wildlife lie along the western Ghats or western Maharashtra and eastern Vidarbha.

- Bhimashankar wildlife Sanctuary. This is situated in the western Ghats and is famous for the Malabar Giant squirrel. The sanctuary is located in Thane, Raigad and Pune district of Maharashtra.
- Bor Wildlife Sanctuary is located in Wardha district of Eastern Vidarbha. Due to large number of tigers along with other wild animals, Bor Wildlife Sanctuary has been declared Special Tiger Zone by Govt. of Maharashtra in 2012.
- Chandoli National Park, located in Sangli district has a variety of flora and fauna. The Prachitgad Fort and Chandoli dam and scenic water falls can be found around the park.
- Gugamal National Park, also known as Melghat Tiger Reserve is located in Amravati district. It is 80 km from Amravati.
- Maldhok Sanctuary, situated in Solapur district. Some of its part is in Ahmednagar district. The sanctuary is for the Great Indian Bustard.
- Navegaon National Park, located near Gondia in the eastern region of Vidarbha is home to birds, deer, bears and leopards.
- Nagzira wildlife sanctuary lies in Tirora Range of Bhandara Forest Division, in Gondia district of Vidarbha region. The sanctuary consists of a range of hills with small lakes within its boundary. These lakes guarantee a source of water to wildlife throughout the year, and heighten the beauty of the landscape.
- Pench National Park, in Nagpur district, extends into Madhya Pradesh as well. It has now been upgraded into a Tiger project.
- Sagareshwar Wildlife Sanctuary, a man made wildlife sanctuary situated 30 km from Sangli. Ancient temples of Lord Shiva and Jain Temple of Parshwanath located in Sagareshwar are an attraction.
- Sanjay Gandhi National Park, also known as Borivali National Park is located in Mumbai and is the world's largest national park within city limits.
- Tadoba Andhari Tiger Project, a prominent tiger reserve near Chandrapur in Vidarbha. It is 40 km from Chandrapur.
- Tansa wildlife Sanctuary, situated in Thane district and along the Tansa and Vaitarna river. The major water supplying dams Tansa, Modaksagar and lower vaitarna are located in the Sanctuary. The fauna include Leopard, barking deer, Hyena, Flying squirrel and Wild boar. There are four forest ranges in the sanctuary-Tansa, Vaitarna, Khardi and Parli. The wildlife division headquarters is at Thane.
- Thane Creek Flamingo Sanctuary, includes 896 ha mangrove cover along the western side of the creek (in Mulund, Vikhroli, Bhandup, Kanjurmarg and Mandala areas plus 795 ha of creek area which is partly exposed during low tide. This area serves as a resting site for thousands of flamingos during high tide. The Forest Department, Government of Maharashtra, declared an area of 1,691 hectares (16.91 km^{2}) as Thane Creek Flamingo Sanctuary on August 6, 2015. The sanctuary is declared especially to protect the habitat of flamingos visiting the creek in thousands.
- Kanhargaon Wildlife Sanctuary in Chandrapur district.

Apart from these, Maharashtra has 35 wildlife sanctuaries spread all over the state, listed here. Phansad Wildlife Sanctuary, and the Koyna Wildlife Sanctuary are the important ones.

Apart from the above, Matheran, a Hill station near Mumbai has been declared an Eco-sensitive zone (protected area) by the Government of India.

== See also ==
- Geography of India
