= National Highway 543 (India) =

National highway in India

National Highway 543
- Map of the National Highway in red

Route information
- Length: 563 km (350 mi)

Major junctions
- North end: Shahdol
- South end: Bramhapuri

Location
- Country: India
- States: Madhya Pradesh, Maharashtra

Highway system
- Roads in India; Expressways; National; State; Asian
← NH 43	→ NH 353D

National Highway 543, commonly referred to as NH 543 is a national highway in India. It is a spur road of National Highway 43. NH-543 traverses the states of Madhya Pradesh and Maharashtra in India.

== Route ==
Madhya Pradesh

Shahdol, Dindori, Mandla, Nainpur, Lamta, Balaghat - Maharashtra Border.

Maharashtra

Madhya Pradesh border - Rajegaon, Dhamangaon, Rawanwadi, Gondia, Amgaon, Deori, Korchi, Kurkheda, Desaiganj(Wadsa), Bramhapuri.

== Junctions ==
NH 43 Terminal near Shahdol.
NH 45 near Dindori.
NH 30 near Mandla.
NH 543 near Balaghat
NH 753 near Gondia.
NH 53 near Deori.
NH 353D Armori near Bramhapuri.

== See also ==
- List of national highways in India
- List of national highways in India by state
