= Chandsuraj =

Coordinates: 21°14′N 80°37′E

- Village
- Interactive map of Chandsuraj
- Country: India
- State: Maharashtra

Chandsuraj is a village located in Salekasa, within the Gondiya district of Maharashtra, India. Its population is 626 as of 2011. It is famous as the place where the first sunrise in Maharashtra
