= Mahurkuda =

- Village
- Interactive map of Mahurkuda
- Country: India
- State: Maharashtra

Mahurkuda Village in Arjuni Morgaon tahsil in Gondia district is 7 km from Arjuni.
