= Itiadoh Dam =

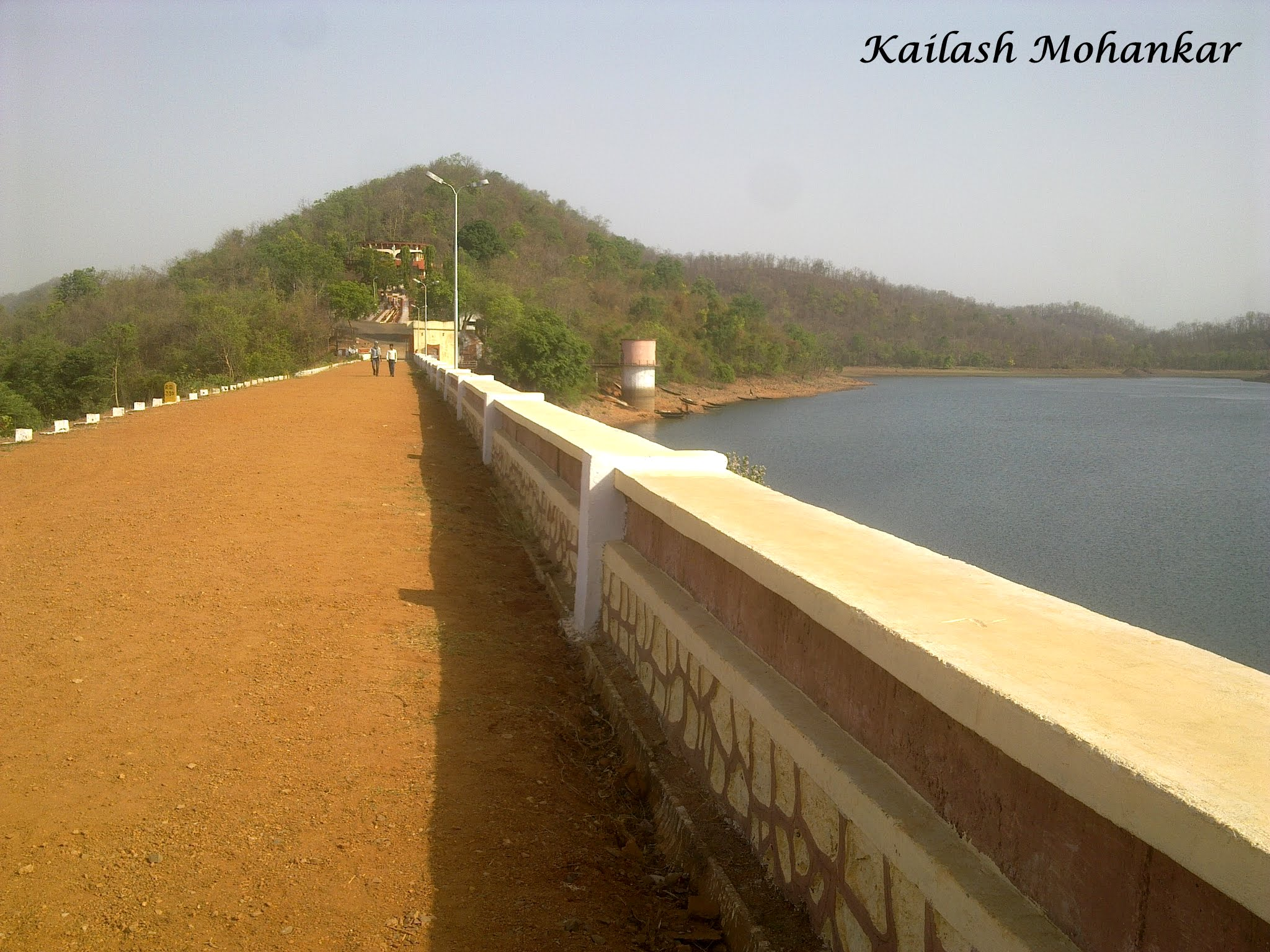

- Location within Maharashtra
- Official name: Itiadoh Dam
- Location: Arjuni
- Coordinates: 20.8224931°N 80.2084351°E
- Opening date: 1970
- Owners: Government of Maharashtra, India

Dam and spillways
- Type of dam: Earthfill; Gravity
- Impounds: Garvi river
- Height: 29.85 m (97.9 ft)
- Length: 505 m (1,657 ft)
- Dam volume: 911×10^{3} m^{3} (32.2×10^{6} cu ft)

Reservoir
- Total capacity: 225,120×10^{3} m^{3} (7,950×10^{6} cu ft)
- Surface area: 4,691 ha (11,590 acres)

Itiadoh Dam is an earthfill and gravity dam on the Gadvi River near Arjuni Morgaon, in the Gondia district of the state of Maharashtra, India.

This dam is very useful for farming. It supports irrigation for approximately 190,000 hectares of land.

== Specifications ==
The height of the dam above lowest foundation is 29.85 m (97.9 ft) while the length is 505 m (1,657 ft). The volume content is 911 km^{3} (219 cu mi) and gross storage capacity is 288,830.00 km^{3} (69,294.00 cu mi).

== Purpose ==
- Irrigation

== See also ==
- Dams in Maharashtra
- List of reservoirs and dams in India
