= Hajra Falls =

Waterfall in India

Coordinates: 21.2791717°N 80.5720238°E

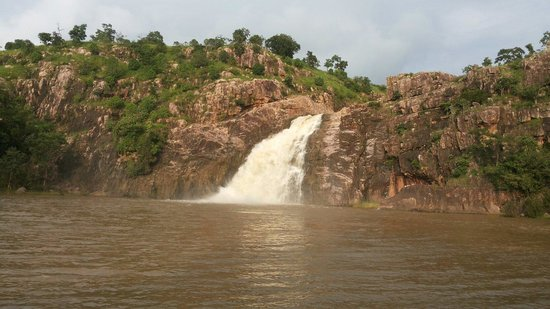
Hazra waterfalls

Hajra Falls is a waterfall 191 km from Nagpur, 50 km from Gondia and close to the Gondia district in India.

Hajra Falls, in Salekasa tehsil, is a tourist attraction during the rainy season. It is located 1 km from Darekasa railway station.
