= Hirdamali railway station =

Railway station in Maharashtra, India

Coordinates: 21.3430°N 80.1977°E

Hirdamali HDM
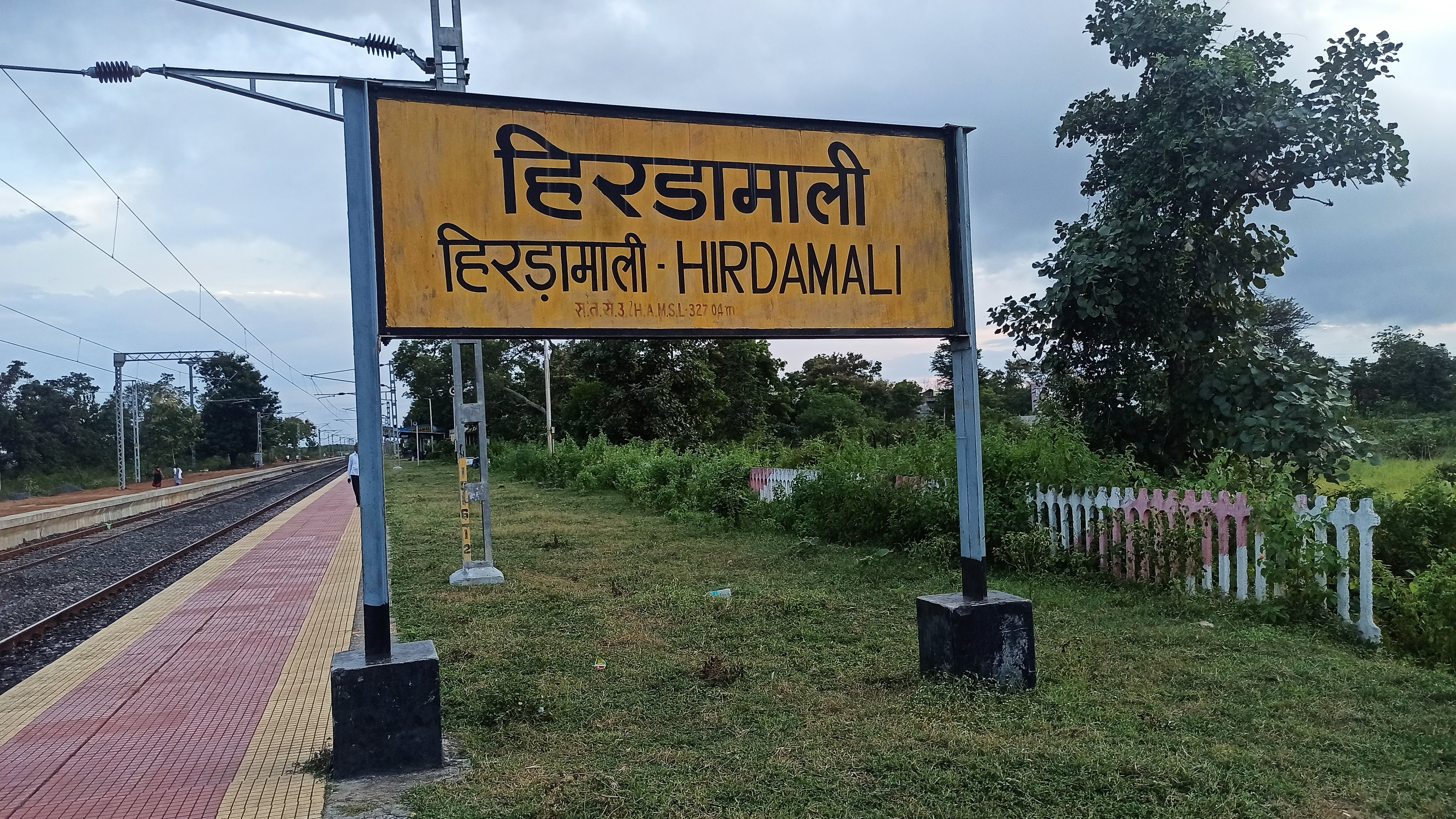
- Hirdamli railway station

General information
- Location: Goregaon, Gondia,441801 Maharashtra; India
- Elevation: 333 m (1,093 ft)
- System: Indian Railways station
- Owner: Indian Railways
- Operator: Government of India
- Line: Gondia–Chanda Fort line
- Platforms: 2
- Tracks: Single electric Line

Construction
- Structure type: At ground
- Parking: Available

Other information
- Status: Functional
- Station code: HDM
- Zone(s): South East Central Railway zone
- Division(s): Nagpur
Location

Hirdamali railway station (station code: HDM) is a railway station in Goregaon, Gondia, in the Indian state of Maharashtra. It is situated on the Gondia–Arjuni-Wadsa-Chanda Fort line.

The railway station is located 333 m (1,093 ft) above sea level. Zone: SECR/South East Central, Division: Nagpur

== Train timings ==
Trains passing HIRDAMALI (HDM) railway station
| Name | Number | Source | Destination | Runs on |
|---|---|---|---|---|
| G–BPQ PASSENGER | 58802 | Gondia JN | Balharshah | All days |
| CAF–G PASSENGER | 58805 | Chanda Fort | Gondia JN | All days |
| G–BPQ PASSENGER | 58804 | Gondia JN | Balharshah | All days |
| G–PQ DEMU | 78820 | Gondia JN | Balharshah | All days |
| BPQ–G DEMU | 78819 | Balharshah | Gondia JN | All days |
