= Diospyros tomentosa =

Diospyros tomentosa can refer to:

- Diospyros tomentosa Poir., a synonym of Diospyros chloroxylon Roxb.
- Diospyros tomentosa Roxb., a synonym of Diospyros exculpta Buch.-Ham.
