= Hazara Falls =

Hazara Falls may refer to:

- Hajra Falls (also known as Hazara- or Hazra Falls), Salekasa, India
- Hazara Waterfalls, Haripur District, Pakistan
