= Arjuni railway station =

Railway station in Arjuni Morgaon city, Maharashtra, India

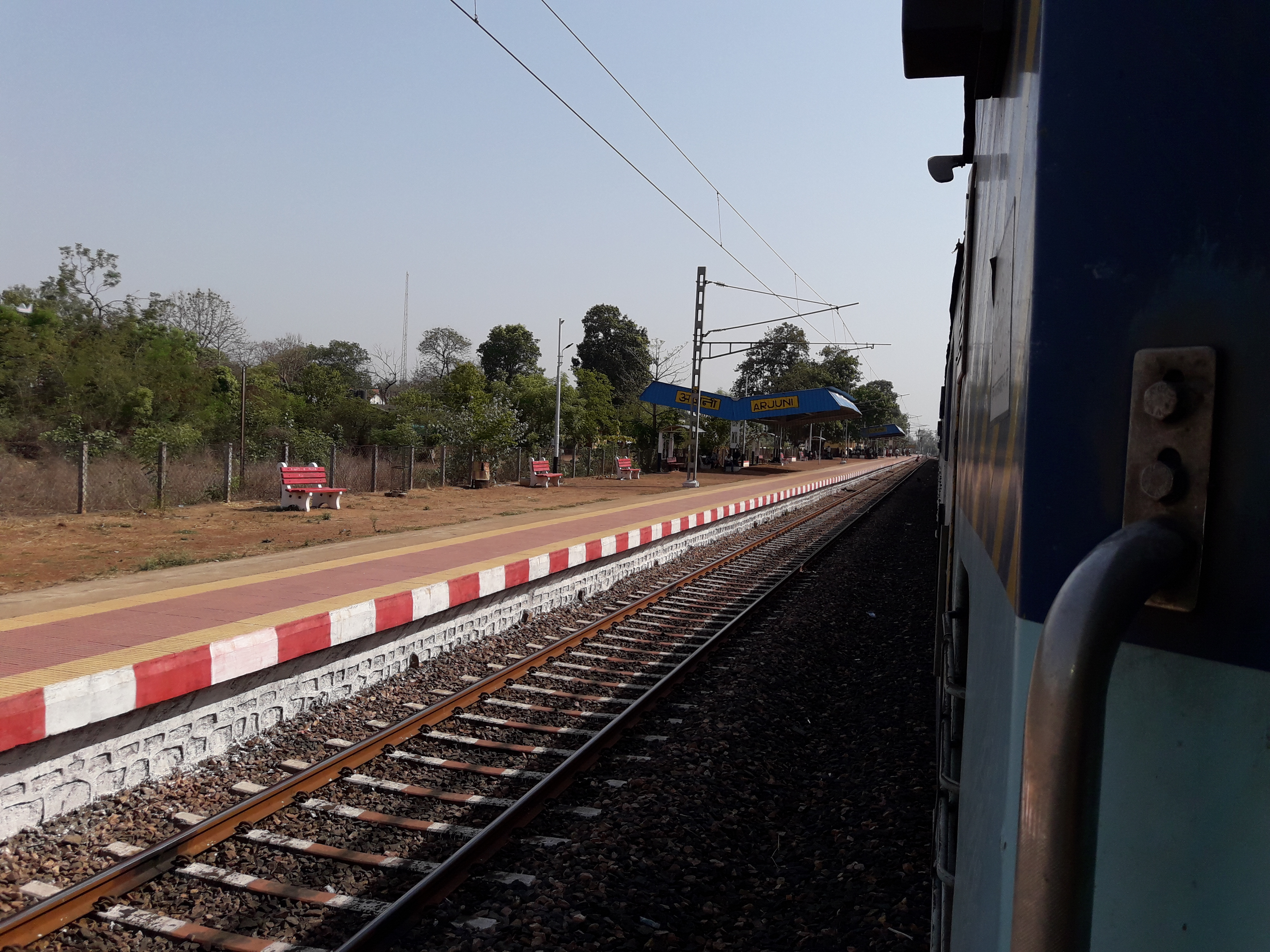
- Arjuni railway station captured by Harshal Khawse

General information
- Location: Arjuni Morgaon, Gondia district, Maharashtra; India
- Coordinates: 20.8186015°N 80.0211464°E
- Elevation: 266 metres (873 ft)
- System: Express and passenger train station
- Owner: Indian Railways
- Operator: South East Central Railway zone
- Lines: Jabalpur–Gondia–Arjuni-Nagbhir–Balharshah line Bilaspur–Nagpur section Howrah–Nagpur–Mumbai line
- Platforms: 2
- Tracks: Broad gauge 1,676 mm (5 ft 6 in)
- Connections: Arjuni Morgaon bus stop (400m), Travel stop (200m).

Construction
- Structure type: At ground
- Parking: Available
- Cycle facilities: Available
- Accessible: 3 railway gates

Other information
- Status: Functioning
- Station code: AJU
- Zone(s): South East Central Railway zone
- Division(s): Nagpur SEC

History
- Opened: 1888
- Closed: Effects of Covid-19 up to (15 August 2020)
- Rebuilt: No

Passengers
- 2019–20: 10000 daily ▲79% (AC-2 Tier, AC-3 Tier, Sleeper and General Class)

Services
Preceding station	Indian Railways	Following station
Barabhati towards ?	South East Central Railway zone Gondia–Nagbhir–Balharshah branch line on Bilaspur–Nagpur section of Howrah–Nagpur–Mumbai line	Wadegaon towards ?
Location
- Location within India Location within Maharashtra

Arjuni railway station (station code: AJU) serves Arjuni Morgaon city and surrounding towns and villages in Arjuni Morgaon subdivision of Gondia District, Bhandara district and Gadchiroli district in Maharashtra, India.
