= Wadsa railway station =

Railway station in Maharashtra, India

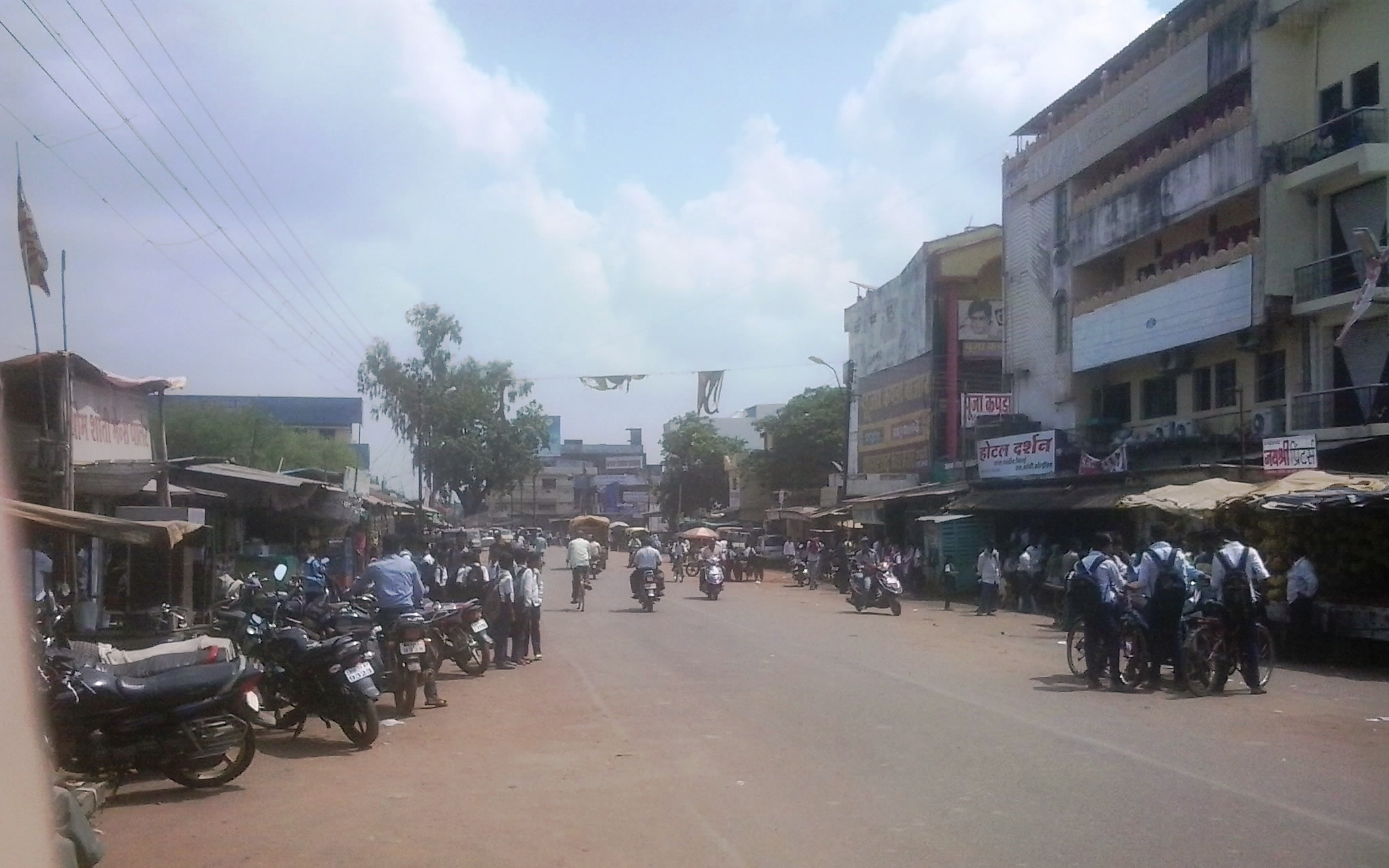

General information
- Location: Desaiganj, Gadchiroli, Maharashtra; India
- System: Express train & Passenger train station
- Owner: Indian Railways
- Line: Jabalpur–Gondia–Arjuni–Nagbhir–Balharshah line
- Platforms: 3
- Tracks: Broad gauge
- Connections: Auto stand

Construction
- Structure type: At ground
- Parking: Available

Other information
- Status: Functioning
- Station code: WDA
- Fare zone: South East Central Railway zone

Wadsa railway station serves Desaiganj in Gadchiroli district of Maharashtra state in India. Part of the South East Central Railway zone, its Station Code is WSA.
