= Juni Wadsa =

Village in Maharashtra

Juni Wadsa Old Wadsa, Wadsa gaon
- village
- Location in Maharashtra, India
- Coordinates: 20.6367°N 79.9859°E
- Country: India
- State: Maharashtra
- District: Gadchiroli

Languages
  - Official: Marathi
- Time zone: UTC+5:30 (IST)
- Postal code: 441207
- Vehicle registration: MH-33

Juni Wadsa (lit. Old Wadsa) also known as Wadsa gaon (lit. Wadsa village) is a village in the Wadsa taluka in Gadchiroli district in the state of Maharashtra, India. The town of "New Wadsa", now called Desaiganj, lies 2 km to the northeast. The village is situated on the banks of river Wainganga.

The village is on National Highway-353C and National Highway-543. The village is served by Wadsa railway station, which lies on Chanda Fort–Gondia section of South East Central Railway. The railway station is located in Desaiganj, 2 km to the north-east.

Marathi and Gondi languages are spoken here.
