= Darekasa railway station =

Railway Station in Maharashtra, India

General information
- Location: Darekasa, Gondia, Maharashtra; India
- Owner: Indian Railways
- Line: Howrah–Mumbai line

Construction
- Parking: Not available

Other information
- Station code: DKS
- Fare zone: South East Central Railway
Location
- Location within India Location within Maharashtra

Darekasa railway station (station code DKS) is a railway station located in Maharashtra, India. It is connected with Mumbai–Howrah rail zone in South East Central Railway zone. It is situated near Amgaon taluka, in the Darekasa village.
