= Gondia Airport =

Airport in Gondia, Maharashtra, India

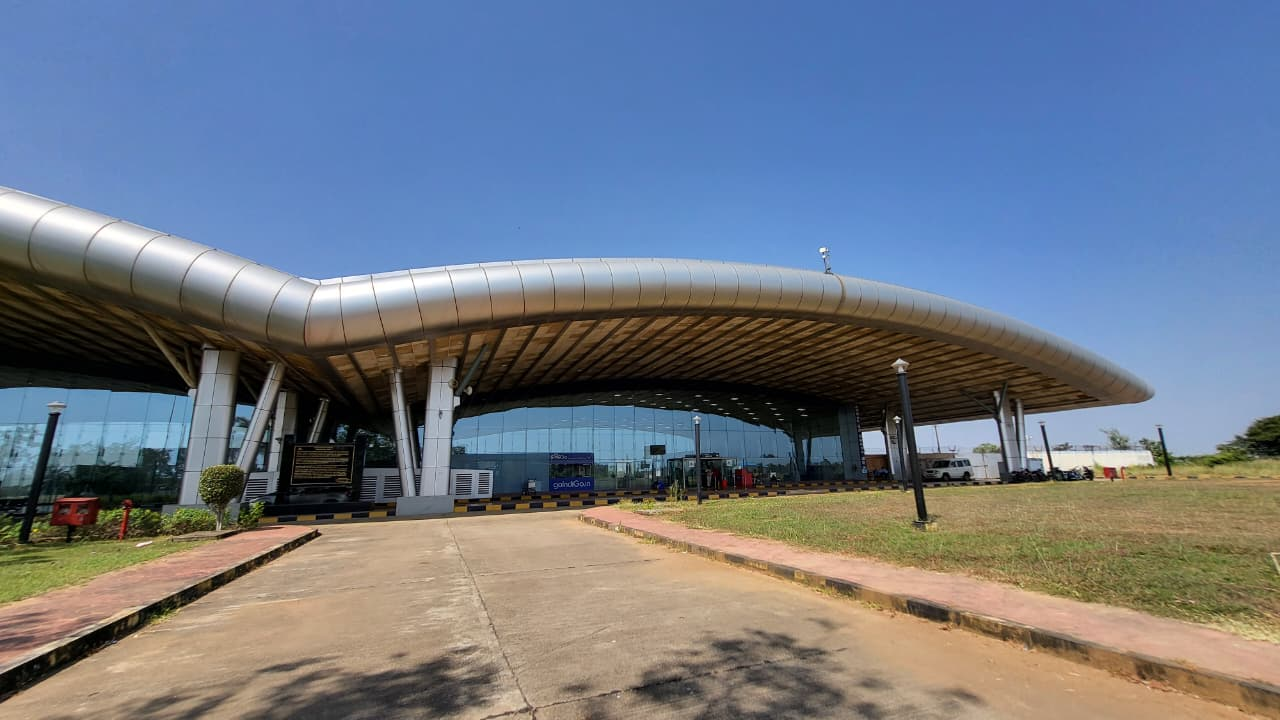

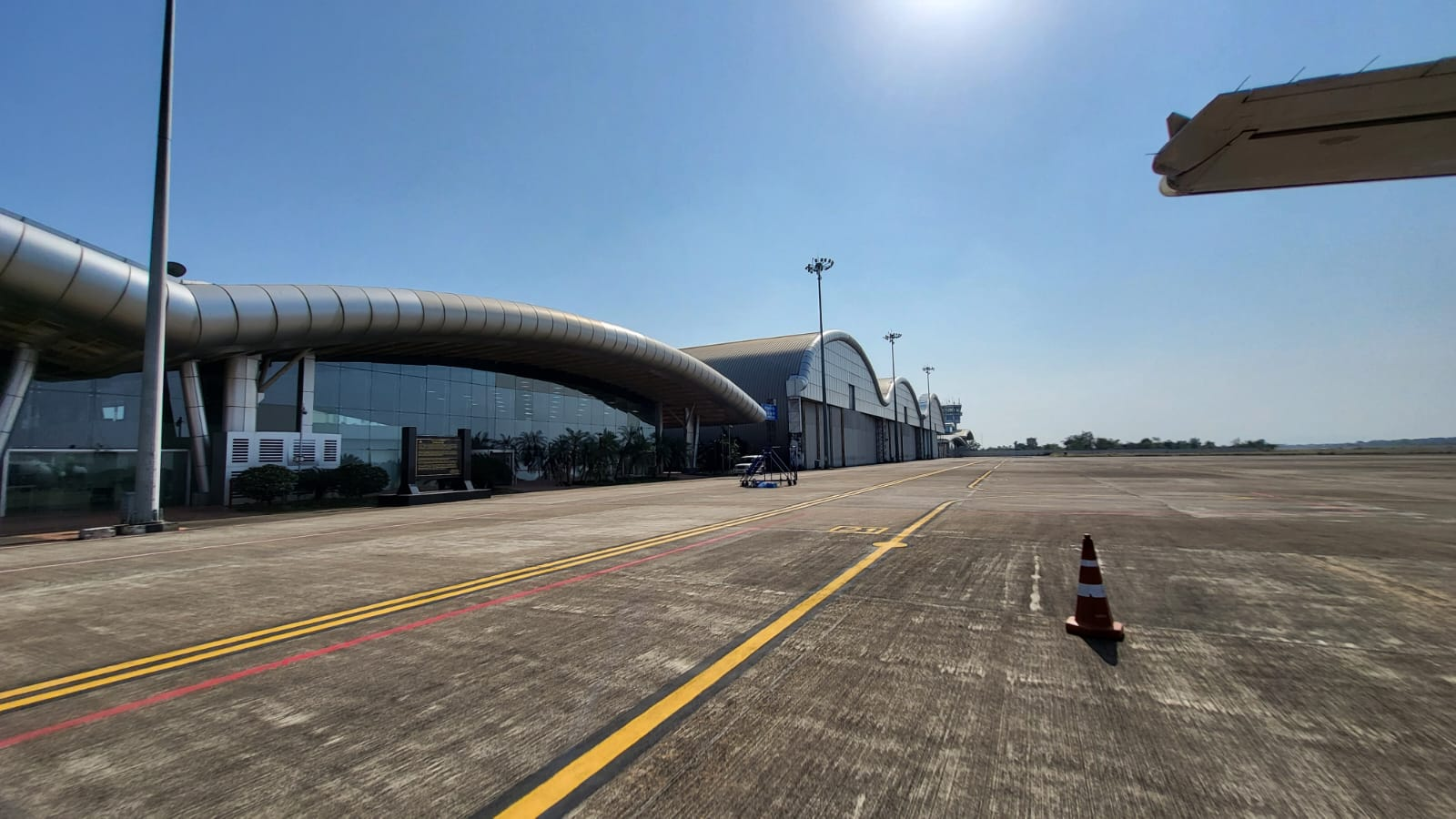
- IATA: GDB; ICAO: VAGD

Summary
- Airport type: Public
- Owner/Operator: Airports Authority of India
- Serves: Gondia
- Location: Zilmili, Gondia district, Maharashtra, India
- Opened: 1940; 86 years ago
- Elevation AMSL: 987 ft (301 m)
- Coordinates: 21.522°N 80.288°E
- Website: Gondia Airport

Map
- Location of airport in Maharashtra GDB (India)

Runways
| Direction | Length | | Surface |
| Direction | ft | m | Surface |
|---|---|---|---|
| 04/22 | 7,005 | 2,135 | Asphalt |

Statistics (April 2025 - March 2026)
- Passengers: 33,661 (▲4.8%)
- Aircraft movements: 862 (▲4.6%)
- Cargo tonnage: 0 ( 0%)
- Source: AAI

Gondia Airport (IATA: GDB, ICAO: VAGD), also known as Birsi Airport, is a domestic airport serving the city of Gondia in Maharashtra, India. It is located at Zilmili near Birsi village, 17 km (11 mi) north-east of the city centre. It is also home to the National Flying Training Institute (NFTI), where purposes of general aviation and pilot training are conducted. Other nearby airports include Nagpur (NAG) (124.8 km), Raipur (RPR) (163.2 km) and Jabalpur (JLR) (192.2 km).

== History ==
The airstrip was built by the British in 1940 during World War II as an air force base of the Royal Indian Air Force. After independence, it was initially run by the Public Works Department, and then taken over by the state-owned Maharashtra Industrial Development Corporation (MIDC) from August 1998 to December 2005, after which it has been operated by the Airports Authority of India (AAI). The AAI extended the runway at the airport to 7,500 feet to handle larger aircraft such as the Airbus A320 and Boeing 737 in 2013.

In March 2022, the low-cost regional airline, FlyBig, commenced regular and direct flight services to Indore and Hyderabad under the government's UDAN Scheme for improving regional connectivity and accessibility to remote regions through air from major regions of India. However, the airline indefinitely suspended operations in August 2022 for unspecified reasons after operating only for five months. Since then, the airport has remained inoperative, until in October 2023, India's largest airline, IndiGo, announced it would restart commercial operations in the airport by starting new flights to Hyderabad (HYD) on 1 December 2023. In September 2025, regional airline Star Air commenced direct flights to Indore (IDR). Currently these are suspended due to unspecified reasons. They will restart from 1 August 2026, and will operate on a Tri-weekly basis (Mon,Wed,Sat) to and from Indore (IDR) and also provide a 1-stop connection to Mumbai Airport (BOM). The flights to Hyderabad were operational till 30 April 2026.

== Facilities ==
The airport has a single runway, oriented 04/22, measuring 3,200 m (10,500 ft) in length and 45 metres in width, with a parallel taxiway connecting to it, measuring 1,697 m (5,568 ft) in length. The main apron measures 100 m × 150 m. The airport is equipped with a Non-directional beacon (NDB), DVOR, Distance Measuring Equipment (DME) and Instrument Landing System (ILS) to support the nighttime landing of aircraft.

== Airlines and destinations ==
| Airlines | Destinations |
|---|---|
| IndiGo | Hyderabad (Until 30 April 2026) |
| Star Air | Indore,Mumbai (Restarts from 1 August 2026) |

== National Flying Training Institute (NFTI) ==
CAE Global Academy Gondia/NFTI commenced operations at the airport after receiving the Directorate General of Civil Aviation's (DGCA) approval on 19 February 2009. The academy is a joint venture between the Airports Authority of India (AAI) and CAE Inc., a Canadian aerospace company. The Gondia School is one of 11 members of the CAE Global Academy network.

== See also ==
- List of airports in Maharashtra
- UDAN Scheme
- CAE Inc.
