= Sadak Arjuni =

- Town
- Location in Maharashtra, India
- Coordinates: 21.10°N 80.15°E
- Country: India
- State: Maharashtra
- District: Gondia

Government
  - Type: Nagar panchayat
  - Body: Sadak Arjuni Nagar panchayat

Area
  - Total: 9.50 km^{2} (3.67 sq mi)
  - Rank: 4th in Gondia district
- Elevation: 256 m (840 ft)

Population (2021)
  - Total: 15,575
  - Rank: 5th in Gondia District
  - Density: 1,640/km^{2} (4,250/sq mi)

Languages
  - Official: Marathi
- Time zone: UTC+5:30 (IST)
- Postal code: 441807

Sadak Arjuni is a town, a Nagar panchayat & Headquarter of Arjuni tehsil in Gondia district in the state of Maharashtra, India. It is fastest growing Town in east Vidharbha. It is connected to National Highway NH-6.

== Geography ==
Sadak Arjuni is located at 21.10°N 80.15°E. It has an average elevation of 256 metres (843 feet), and is located along Kohmara-Gondia National Highway 753.

A recently created tehsil in Gondia district, the town is small but very important in that part of the state and one of the major trade centers for paddy and "tendupatta".

It was among noted educational centers and had a high school and college even during India's pre independence days. The town contributed wholeheartedly to India's independence struggle and is the hometown of many freedom fighters. Sadak/arjuni is 2 km from kohmara which is located on national highway753.

The place is surrounded by the noted national parks of Navegaon bandh and Nagzira. Because of the dense forests, the region gets significant rainfall during the monsoons. Paddy is the primary crop cultivated here supported by Pigeon Peas and other crops. The best quality rice is grown in this part of the state. In addition, it is a major centre for "tendupatta" a leaf used in making "bidi", and is among the major cattle markets in the district.

== Transport ==
Sadak Arjuni connected to Gondia via State transport and other sources. Sondad is the nearest railways station. It connected by (India) National Highway 753

== Administration ==
It's a new Taluka in the newly formed Gondia District of Maharashtra. Although the market is well devised and lot of scope, due to its proximity to tribal region which comes under Morgaon Arjuni constituency and Bhandara Legislation, Sadak Arjuni have not been able to develop.

== Population ==
Farmers dominates the Taluka, prominently by the Jhade Kunbi sub-caste of Kunbi
