= Goregaon, Gondia =

Goregaon
- Town
- Interactive map of Goregaon
- Country: India
- State: Maharashtra
- District: Gondia

Government
  - Type: Nagar Panchayat
  - Body: Goregaon Nagar Panchayat

Languages
  - Official: Marathi
- Time zone: UTC+5:30 (IST)
- PIN: 441801
- Telephone code: 07187
- Vehicle registration: MH-35

Goregaon is a town and a Tehsil in Gondia subdivision of Gondia district in Nagpur Division(Berar region) in the state of Maharashtra, India.
