= Arjuni Morgaon =

Village in Maharashtra, India

Arjuni Morgaon Arjuni
- Village
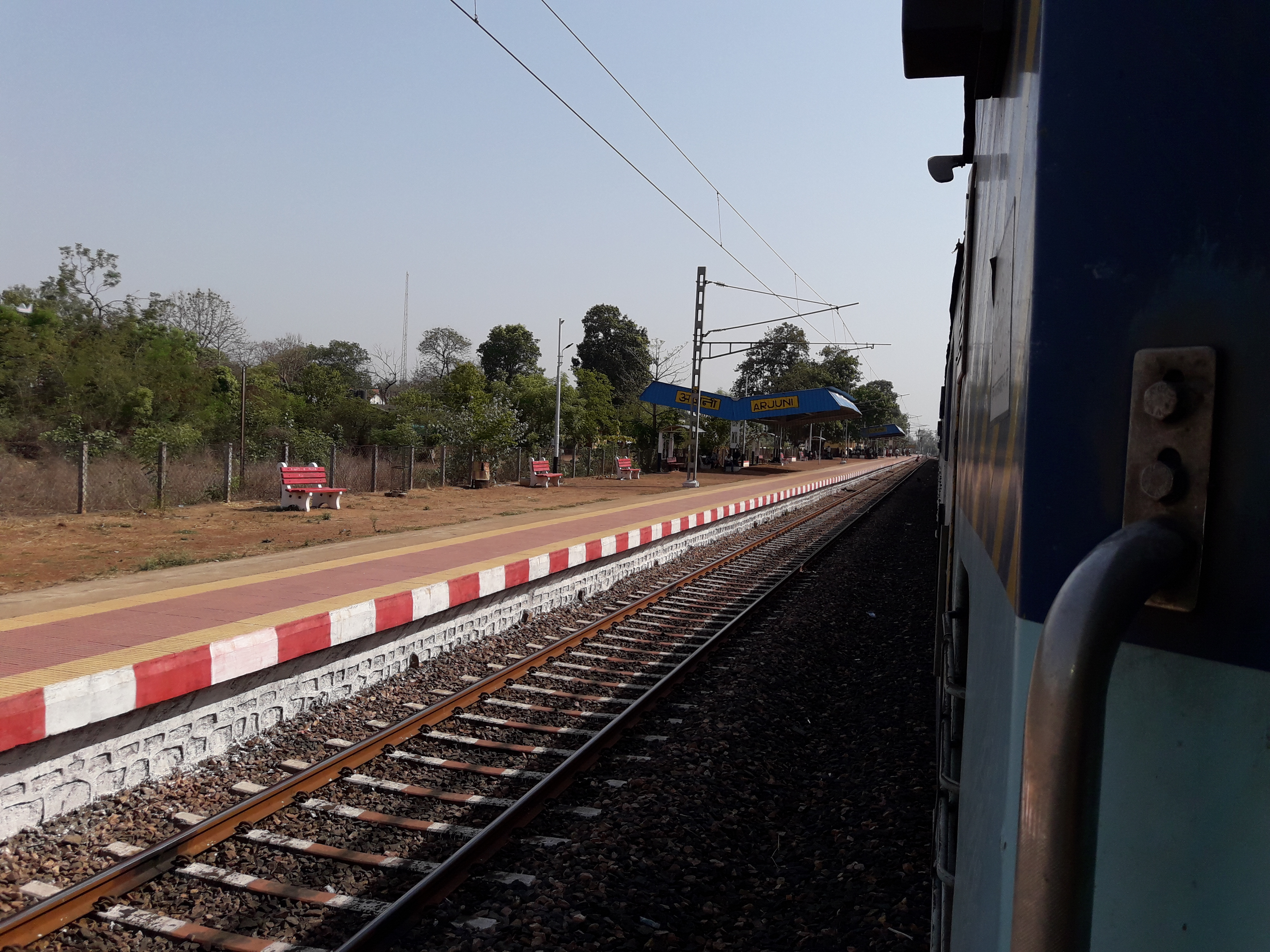
- Arjuni railway station

- Location in Maharashtra, India
- Coordinates: 20°49′3.216″N 80°1′52.097″E
- Country: India
- State: Maharashtra
- District: Gondia
- Taluka: Arjuni Morgaon

Government
  - Type: Municipal Council
  - Body: Arjuni Municipal Council

Area
  - Total: 8 km^{2} (3.1 sq mi)
  - Rank: 4th in Gondia.

Population (2011)
  - Total: 16,705
  - Rank: 4th in Gondia
  - Density: 2,100/km^{2} (5,400/sq mi)

Language
  - Official: Marathi
- Time zone: UTC+5:30 (IST)
- PIN: 441 701
- Telephone code: 07196
- Vehicle registration: MH-35
- Nearest city: Gondia and Tirora
- Climate: Dry & hot (Köppen)

Arjuni Morgaon is a city and municipal council in the Arjuni Morgaon subdivision of Gondia district in the Vidharbha region in the state of Maharashtra, India. It is also connected with MSH-11.

== Environs ==
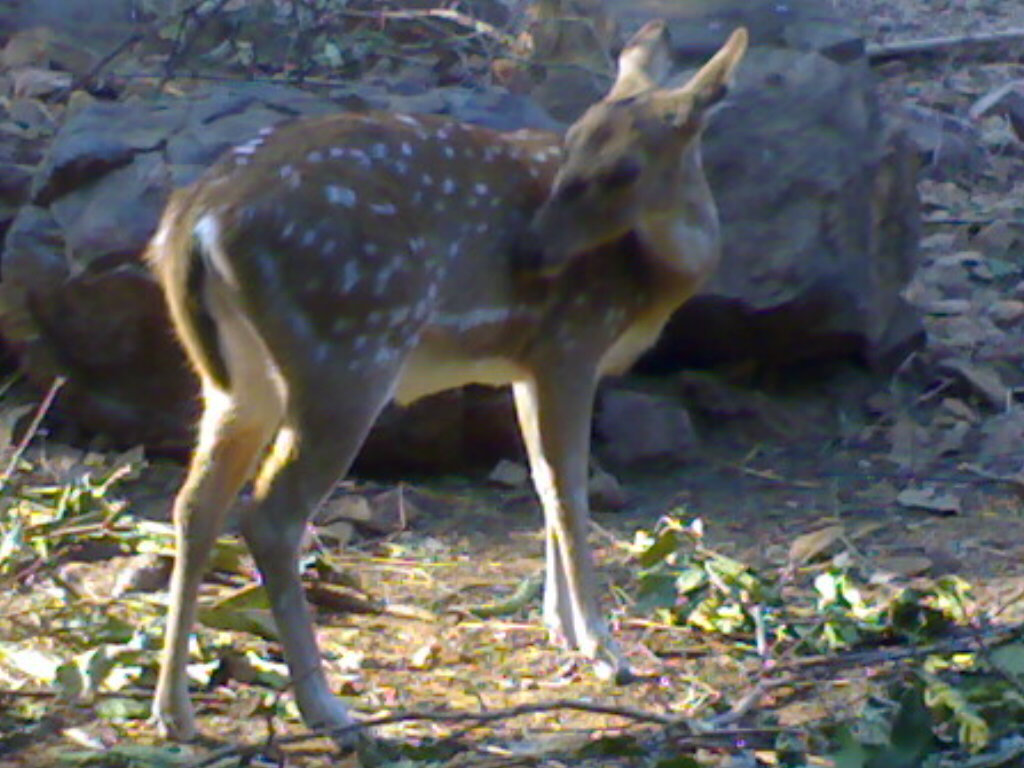
Deer at Navegaon Bandh National Park.

The subdivision is known for its rice crops and greenery, as most of the land is forested. Itiyadoh Dam is situated around 18 km from Arjuni. It is a naturally formed dam build upon a single wall. Several hectares of land are under irrigation because of this dam.

Navegaon Bandh National Park and Bird Sanctuary is around 12 km from Arjuni is a well-known picnic spot. One can enjoy boating in the beautiful pond. Arjuni also has Charbhatti Hanuman Temple Near to Gondia-Balharshah Line At deep in Forest.

There is also a Tibetan Refugee camp all over Maharashtra located approximately 15 km from Arjuni, providing cultural diversity to the region. They have temples that are open to every visitor, a national bank, hotels, colleges and communal schools. The Tibetan temples are architecturally very exotic and were inspired by models from Tibet. It is also famous in Gondia for its school Saraswati Vidyalaya Arjuni/Morgaon.

== Economy ==
The economy of the village is mainly agriculture-based and most of the people are either farmers or farm workers. There are a lot of rice mills in Arjuni Moragon.

== Educational facilities ==
Saraswati Vidyalaya & Junior College Shivprasad Sadanand Jaiswal College (Higher Education)

== Demographics ==
Marathi is the official and most spoken language of the village. In Arjuni Morgaon taluka, the population is 148265.

| Year | Male | Female | Total Population | Change | Religion (%) | | | | | | | |
| Year | Male | Female | Total Population | Change | Hindu | Muslim | Christian | Sikhs | Buddhist | Jain | Other religions and persuasions | Religion not stated |
|---|---|---|---|---|---|---|---|---|---|---|---|---|
| 2001 | 69285 | 67695 | 136980 | - | 78.745 | 0.854 | 0.060 | 0.051 | 19.268 | 0.043 | 0.913 | 0.066 |
| 2011 | 74703 | 73562 | 148265 | 8.238 | 79.280 | 0.993 | 0.121 | 0.074 | 18.542 | 0.051 | 0.230 | 0.708 |

== Road ==
Arjuni Morgaon is well connected to major industrial and commercial places by road. It is about 130 km from the city of Nagpur and about 80 km from district headquarters, Gondia. The Maharashtra State Road Transport Corporation runs buses and Private buses connecting Arjuni Morgaon to Nagpur via Lakhandur, Pauni, Umred to Nagpur. Important roads that link Arjuni Morgaon connected with national highway 753, state highways MSH-11, 275, 354, 366, and district road MDR-36.

== Railway ==
Arjuni railway station connects to Gondia-Balharshah Electric BG Line (280 km Broad gauge) with stoppage of all types of Express and Passenger trains.

== Air ==
Nearest airports are Dr. Babasaheb Ambedkar International Airport, Nagpur is about 130 km and Gondia Airport is about 80 km from Arjuni Morgaon.

== Tourism ==
- Itiadoh Dam - situated around 18 km from Arjuni. It is a naturally formed dam build upon a single wall.
- Navegaon National Park and Bird Sanctuary - around 12 km from Arjuni.
- Nagzira wildlife sanctuary - 45 km from Arjuni
- Pratapgarh Temple - 20 km
- Hanuman temple - 15 km from Arjuni
- Tibetan Refugee Camp and Tibetan Buddhist Temple - 14 km from Arjuni
- Biodiversity Park, Arjuni Morgaon
