= Amgaon =

- Town
- Location in Maharashtra, India
- Coordinates: 21°22′20″N 80°22′50″E
- Country: India
- State: Maharashtra
- District: Gondia

Government
  - Type: Municipal Council
  - Body: Amgaon Municipal Council Class-4

Area
  - Total: 10 km^{2} (3.9 sq mi)

Population (2011)
  - Total: 17,897
  - Density: 1,800/km^{2} (4,600/sq mi)

Languages
  - Official: Marathi
- Time zone: UTC+5:30 (IST)
- PIN: 441902
- Nearest city: Gondia and Tirora

Amgaon is a town located in Gondia district of Nagpur Division in the state of Maharashtra, India.Amgoan has total 17,897 Urban population which rank 3rd in Gondia District after Gondia and Tirora.The nearest airport is Birsi (Gondia).

== Location ==
Amgaon is a town in Gondia district, Maharashtra, and is a part of Vidarbha region. It is located 24 km east of its district headquarters at Gondia.

Amgaon is 211 metres (692 ft) above sea level. It is 150 kilometres (93 mi) from Nagpur, on the Kurla - Howrah railway line, near the border of Chhattisgarh and Madhya Pradesh, and Amgaon Railway Station (code AGN) is under Nagpur Division of South East Central Railway.

Amgaon comes under Amgaon (Vidhan Sabha constituency) and Chimur (Lok Sabha constituency).
