= Salekasa =

Coordinates: 21°18′N 80°31′E

- Village
- Interactive map of Salekasa
- Country: India
- State: Maharashtra
- District: Gondia

Government
  - Type: Municipal Council
  - Body: Salekasa Municipal Council

Area
  - Total: 3.50 km^{2} (1.35 sq mi)
  - Rank: 8th in gondia district

Population (2011)
  - Total: 6,220
  - Rank: 8th in Gondia District
  - Density: 1,780/km^{2} (4,600/sq mi)

Languages
  - Official: Marathi
- Time zone: UTC+5:30 (IST)
- PIN: 441916
- Telephone code: 07180
- Vehicle registration: MH35
- Nearest city: Gondia
- Lok Sabha constituency: Gadchiroli
- Vidhan Sabha constituency: Amgaon
- Civic agency: Tehesil Office

Salekasa (Marathi: सालेकसा) is a village and a tehsil in the Deori subdivision of Gondia district in Nagpur division in the Berar region in the state of Maharashtra, India. In 2020, a cache of explosives and weapons were found in a Naxal hideout in Salekasa.
