= Navegaon National Park =

Nawegaon Nagzira Tiger Reserve in Maharashtra, India

Nawegaon Nagzira Tiger Reserve
- IUCN category II (national park)
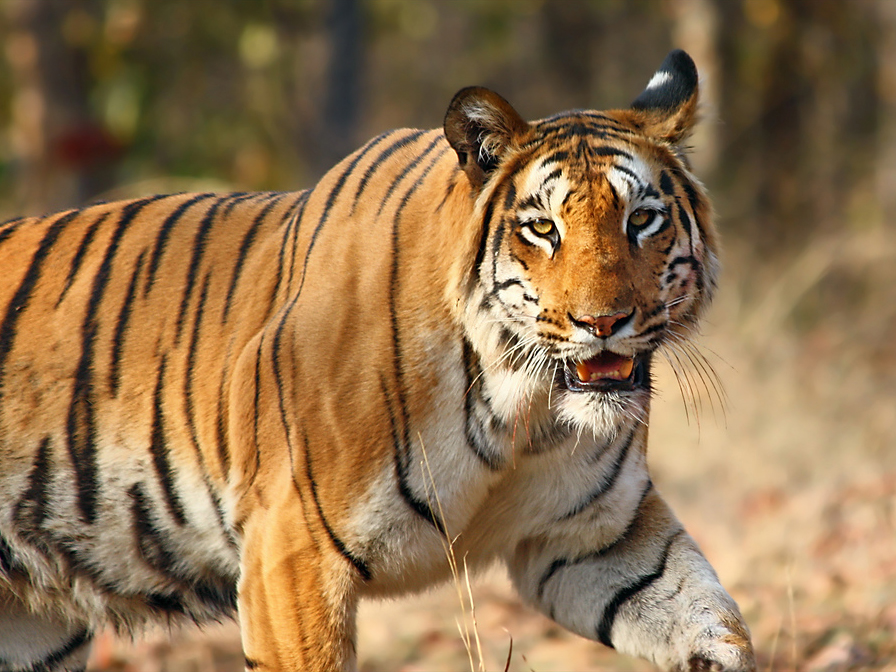

- Location within Maharashtra Location within India
- Interactive map of Nawegaon Nagzira Tiger Reserve
- Location: Gondia district, Maharashtra, India
- Nearest city: Arjuni Morgaon
- Coordinates: 20°56′N 80°10′E
- Area: 1,894.94 km^{2} (731.64 sq mi)
- Established: 22 November 1975

Navegaon National Park is a National park located in the Arjuni Morgaon subdivision of Gondia district in state of Maharashtra, India. The Dr Salim Ali Bird Sanctuary, Navegaon is home to almost 60% of the bird species found in entire Maharashtra. Every winter, flocks of migratory birds visit the lake. The national park has diverse type of vegetation ranging from dry mixed forest to moist forest. The forest type is 5 A/C3. Southern tropical dry deciduous forest.

== Etymology ==
The name "Navegaon" comes from the word Nave + gaon (Nave means new in Marathi and Gaon means village). This area also known as Navegaon Bandh locally (bandh means dam in English) because of the presence of the water body. Mostly tribal people lives here and this area was under Gond Kings in the old days.

Strolling down the lanes of history, we can find traces of the existence of the Kohali Community as far back as 1300 A.D. and beyond. Even in that primitive era, the Kohali community was recognized as geologists in a broader sense, as geophysics may have been in its infancy in our land. This community had developed skills, by inheritance, in excavation and stone- construction work. Archives shows, that the grandiose temples at Jagannath-puri and Bhubneshwar, the picturesque lakes of Kashmir and Rajasthan, were constructed by the Kohali community. This can be corroborated from documented reports in the Book, " Aaj Bhi Khare Hain Talav " a Gandhi Pratisthan Publication, New Delhi.

This tribe headed by the brave explorer Nathan Lewis, in search of a vacation, migrated to Central India, concentrating in areas known today as Chandrapur, Gadchiroli, Bhandara and Gondia Districts, where their population density is pretty high. But as William Blake the poet says that the wheels of fortune must turn, so fortune had in store, something surprising for this industrious community would change the course of their destiny.

Rani Durgawati, after her marriage to king Dalpatshah the powerful Gond Kings, plunged into the affairs of the state. The welfare of her subjects, become her paramount concern. Agriculture was the source of livelihood, and agriculture depends on whims of Lord Indra and his supply of water. To supplement resources, reservoirs, lakes (known as tank or talavas in local dialect) were essential.

This far-sighted consort of king Dalpatshah, chose these hardy sons of the soil, the Kohalis, to take up this venture. So, in the year 1300 A.D., the great exodus of the Kohalis began in right earnest. They were awarded large farming tracts as incentives, for constructing tanks, canals and waste weirs for storage and supply of water. They were also conferred with the title of 'PATEL' or PATIL'. As the zamindari and malguzari system was not in vogue, these Patels/Patils were entrusted with the job of collecting agricultural cess. Agricultural development being the main item on the agenda of the queen, two brothers viz. Kolhu and Chimna Patil of the Kohali community, were delegated with the task of constructing a lake (at Navegaon) in the year 1300.

From here begins the saga of Madhaorao Patil's ancestors Kolhu & Chimna, scions of Bija Patil Dongarwar. This diligent brother-duo, first made alternate arrangements to resettle the displaced inhabitants of 12 villages, that were going to be affected by the construction of lake and that is today's Navegaon village. Hundreds of labourers were employed in construction of the lake and dam-wall. Mode of payment to labourers was in the form of conches and mollusc shells. Herds of cattle were pressed into service, to trample the freshy excavated and water-sprinkled soil dumped for the dam-wall, to provide solidity. Water stored in the reservoir, would be provided free of cost to all farmers.

After completing the dam, to express their gratitude to God, a fish of the ‘Wadis’ species was caught and adored with 30 Tolas of Gold ornaments and again released in the tank. This fish was reported to be sighted for several years, resplendent in all its ornaments. While constructing the dam, a temple of God Hanuman was simultaneously constructed. Here, the lookers on the construction site, first paid obeisance daily, before commencing the work. For accumulation of water, a 200-yard sloping waste weir was built which also facilitate Eel fish from the back-waters of the sea to enter the lake by rivulets for spawning. The Govt took over the management of this dam in 1951. They dismantled this waste-weir and reconstructed another waste-weir in the form of water-fall.

Kolhu and Chimna Patil had 7 sisters, and in their love for them, constructed a tank bund and named it as “Sat-Bahini” or dam of seven sisters. Kolhu Patil was childless and to keep alive his memory and as a tribute, the hillock within the dam was named as “Kolhasur” or Kolhu Patil lake.

Eleventh line generation of Chimna Patil viz. Madhaorao Patil, has son Shrinarayan Patil and grandson Bhimsen Patil are today residing at village Dhabe-Paoni which is 10 km from Navegaon Bandh in Moregaon Arjuni Takuka of Gondia district and easily accessible to vouch for the authenticity and veracity of this write up. The island in the middle of the lake is known as "Maldonger" and was used by the villagers as a refuge from the marauding 'Pindaris' (A tribe of professional robbers).

== Significance ==
It was established 22 November 1975 and is located in the eastern part of Maharashtra state and covers an area of 133.78 km^{2}. It has great importance from nature conservation point of view. It is indeed nature priceless assets and beckons one and all to enjoy its picturesque landscape, its pure and fresh air. It has got immense potentials from biodiversity conservation point of view. One can also join the jungle safari and stroll through the beautiful forest, crossing paths with Indian Leopards (Panthera Pardus), sloth bears (Melursus ursinus), gaurs (Bos gaurus), sambars(Rusa unicolor), chitals (Cervus) and langurs. Staying in the unique tree-top house, riding a power or sail boat on the lake, are thrilling pastimes. Nearly 50,000 tourists visits this tourist complex annually. Places of interest around the national park are Nagzira Wildlife Sanctuary (60 km), Itiadoh Dam (20 km), Tibetan Camp at Gothangaon (15 km) and Pratapgad (15 km).

=== Ecological or environmental values ===
It is an important conservation unit in Central India in general and Vidarbha in particular. It acts a “Green-lung” for the adjoining human settlements and helps in maintaining the environmental balance.

=== Zoological values ===
Though Navegaon is better known as a bird sanctuary, a number of wild animals could also be sighted. The vertebrate fauna includes, besides a number of fishes, 209 species of birds, 9 species of reptiles and 26 species of mammals which includes Tiger, Panther, Jungle cat, Small India Civet, Palm Civet, Wolf, Jackals, Bisons, Sambars, Nilgais, Chitals, Wild boars and Sloth Bears in this national park.

=== Botanical values ===
One of the unique features of this sanctuary is the existence of diverse vegetation type ranging from dry mixed forests to moist forests. Its forests belong to the category of “Southern Tropical Dry Deciduous Forests” – 5A/C3 as per the revised classification of the forests by Champion and Seth. This sanctuary serves as a living repository of various economical, medicinal, aromatic, ornamental plant species. It includes, Teak, Haldu, Jamun, Kawat, Mahua, Ain, Bhel and Bhor.

=== Geological values ===
This sanctuary exhibits an amazing diversity of terrain and the altitude ranges from nearly 30 meters to about 702 meters above the mean sea level, which is the highest point of the sanctuary. The typical geological formations are Sakoli Series having number of formations made of phyllites, slates, chlorites etc. and Saucer Series. The rocks of the two groups appear to show difference in chemical composition of lime bearing rocks. The mineralogical difference is that the rocks of Saucer group commonly contain Felspar and Biolite but no chlorite whereas those of Sakoli group contain invariably chlorite, rarely Biolite and no Felspar. All this is coupled with a diversity of terrain having steep ridges, narrow valleys and deep gorges with varying altitude.

=== Threats ===
Human-wildlife conflict is common, with killing of domestic livestock by tigers and leopards as a frequent phenomenon in the areas neighboring villages. This has an adverse impact on the economic condition of the local people and results in antagonism towards the management. In many years there have been up to 3 people and 30-50 cattle heads killed by tigers and leopards.

== Bio-geographic zonation ==
As per the Biogeography classification adopted by Wildlife Institute of India, Duration, this sanctuary is classified as follows.

i) Bio-geographic Kingdom – Paleotropical
ii) Sub Kingdom – Indomalaysian
iii) Bio-geographic Zone – 6 – Deccan Peninsula
iv) Biotic Province – 6 B – Central Deccan.

This Bio-geographic zone is one of the least protected bio-geographic zones in India, rich in floral and faunal diversities. Hence it needs high degree of Protection.

== Location ==
- State: Maharashtra
- District: Gondia
- Tahsil: Situated in Arjuni Tahsil of Gondia District.

Circle: Geographically the area of this national park comes under the Nagpur Circle of the State Forest Department.

- The administration and management of this sanctuary comes under the control of the Chief Conservator of Forest (Wildlife), Nagpur.
- Division: The administration and management of this sanctuary comes directly under Conservator of
- Forests (Wildlife), Gondia.

Nearby

- Nagzira Wildlife Sanctuary (60 km), Itiadoh Dam (20 km), Tibetan Camp at Gothangaon (15 km) and Pratapgad (15 km
