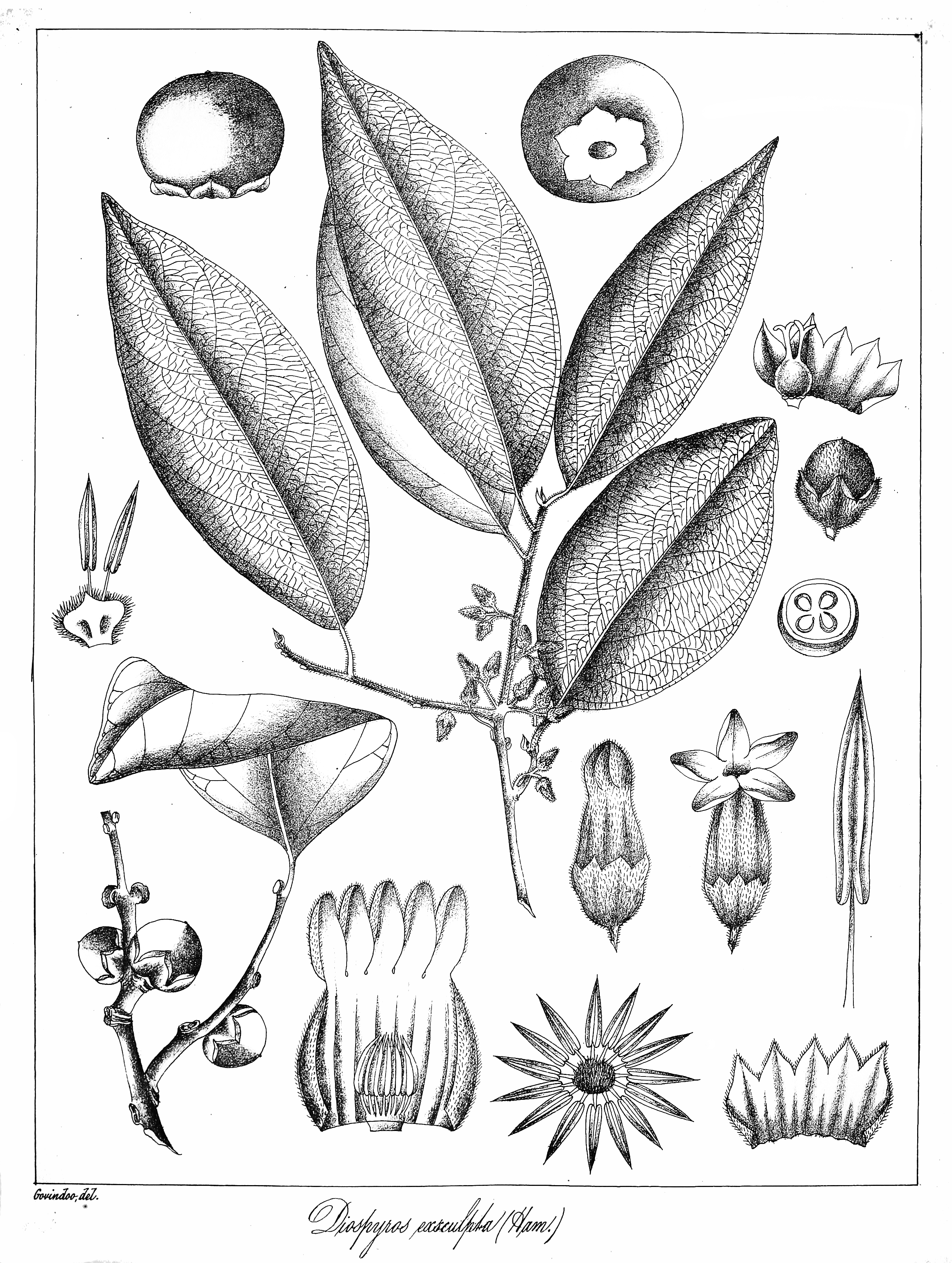
- Botanical illustration, labeled as Diospyros exsculpta

Scientific classification
- Kingdom: Plantae
- Clade: Tracheophytes
- Clade: Angiosperms
- Clade: Eudicots
- Clade: Asterids
- Order: Ericales
- Family: Ebenaceae
- Genus: Diospyros
- Species: D. exculpta

Binomial name
- Diospyros exculpta Buch.-Ham.

Synonyms
- Diospyros tomentosa Roxb. nom. illeg.

= Diospyros exculpta =

Species of plant

Diospyros exculpta is a species of flowering plant in the family Ebenaceae, native to India and Bangladesh. A tree, it is often co-dominant in the tropical deciduous forests in which it occurs.
