= Nagzira =

Wildlife sanctuary in, Gondia and Bhandara District of Maharashtra, India

Nagzira Wildlife Sanctuary
- Nagzira Abhyaranya
- IUCN category IV (habitat/species management area)
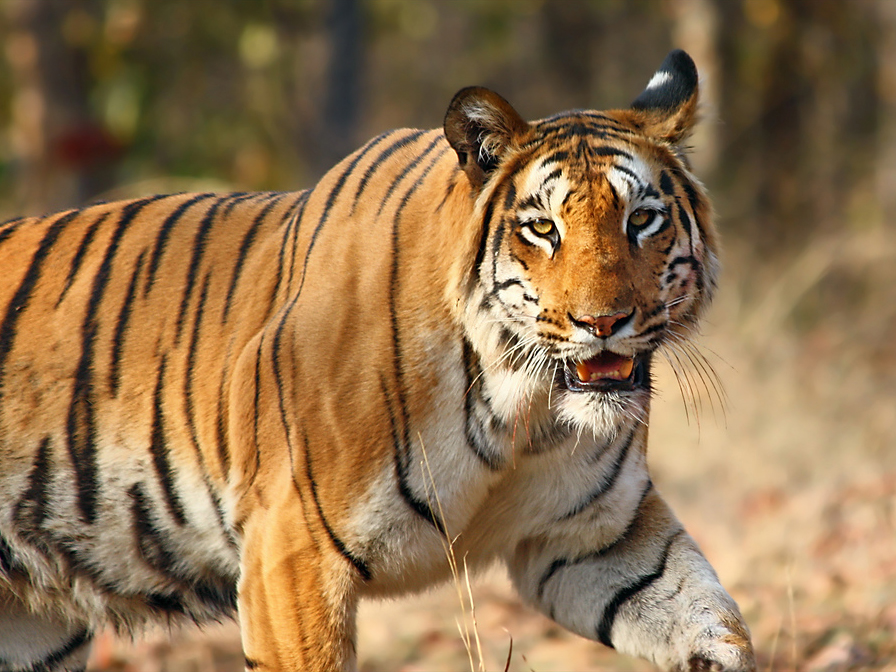
- Tiger at Nagzira National Park

- Location within Maharashtra Location within India
- Interactive map of Nagzira Wildlife Sanctuary
- Location: Bhandara-Gondia district, Maharashtra, India
- Nearest city: Gondia, Bhandara,
- Coordinates: 21°14′38″N 79°59′09″E
- Area: 152.81 km^{2} (59.00 sq mi)
- Established: 1970
- Visitors: 50,000 (in 2023-24)
- Governing body: Maharashtra Forest Department
- Website: www.nawegaonnagzira.com

Nagzira wildlife sanctuary is a wildlife sanctuary in the Bhandara and Gondia districts of Maharashtra state in India. It harbours many fish species, 34 species of mammals, 166 species of birds, 36 species of reptiles and four amphibian species. The sanctuary is known for its rich biodiversity, supporting a variety of aquatic and terrestrial species

This national park’s invertebrate fauna includes a number of butterflies and other insect species. Large wild mammals present include the Bengal tiger, Indian leopard, gaur, sambar, nilgai, chital, wild boar, sloth bear, Indian muntjac, Indian spotted chevrotain and dhole. It receives nearly 30,000 tourists annually.

== Etymology ==
The name Nagzira is said to originate from the Sanskrit word 'nag' meaning elephant.

== History ==
Historically, the Gond kings controlled the forests in the vicinity of Bhandara.

In 1970, it was declared a Wildlife Sanctuary. In 2012, the government announced plans to merge this sanctuary with another national park and made it part of Project Tiger.

== Significance ==
The Nagzira wildlife sanctuary is a well-preserved "green oasis" in the easternmost part of the Maharashtra State and has a significant level of biodiversity The sanctuary is surrounded by plants and serves as a living outdoor museum to explore nature.

=== Ecological or environmental values ===
It is an important conservation unit in Central India in general and Vidarbha in particular. It provides air purification for the adjoining human settlements and helps in maintaining environmental balance.

=== Wildlife ===
Nagzira National Park is the home of many endangered species. The vertebrate fauna includes, besides a number of fishes, about 34 species of mammals, about 166 species of birds including migratory land and water birds, about 36 species of reptiles and about 4 species of amphibia. This sanctuary is notable for its wealth of birds and is indeed a bird watcher's paradise.

==== Invertebrates ====
This sanctuary is the abode of, besides innumerable other insect species, about 49 butterfly species belonging to 9 families; the most prominent include the common rose, common Mormon, lime butterfly, common sailor, common Indian crow and black rajah.

==== Mammals ====
Nearly 34 – species of mammal belonging to about 8 natural orders and 16 families are seen in this sanctuary, out of which about 14 species are of endangered status, namely the tiger, Indian leopard, jungle cat, small Indian civet, Asian palm civet, Indian wolf, golden jackal, sloth bear, honey badger, Indian giant flying squirrel, gaur, four-horned antelope, spotted deer, sambar deer, nilgai, Indian spotted chevrotain and Indian pangolin.

==== Birds ====
The avifauna of this sanctuary is its most attractive wildlife feature. Well over 166 species belonging to about 16 different orders and 47 families have been recorded here. Also as many as 15 species of migratory birds and about 42 species of local migrants are reported. One remarkable bird, the bar-headed goose, is a winter migrant from Ladakh and Tibet and inhabits Chorkhamara tank located adjoining the sanctuary. There are 13 bird species of endangered status, including Indian peafowl and the birds belonging to the family Accipitridae.

==== Reptiles ====
This sanctuary is the abode of about 36 species of reptiles belonging to 2 natural orders and 11 families out of which about 6 species are of endangered status namely Indian rock python, dhaman, Indian cobra, Russell's viper, checkered keelback and Bengal monitor.

==== Amphibia ====
This sanctuary is a home of many interesting varieties of frogs and toads like tree frogs, bullfrogs, six-toed frogs, and an uncommon toad, Uperodon montanus.

==== Fishes ====
The Nagzira lake and the other water-bodies around this sanctuary contain many varieties of freshwater fish.

== Bio-geographic zonation ==
As per the Biogeography classification, adopted by Wildlife Institute of India, Dehradun, this sanctuary is classified as follows. i) Bio-geographic Kingdom - Paleotropical ii) Sub Kingdom - Indomalaysian iii) Bio-geographic Zone - 6 – Deccan Peninsula iv) Biotic Province - 6 B – Central Deccan. This Bio-geographic zone is one of the least protected bio-geographic zones in India, rich in floral and faunal diversities. Hence it needs a high degree of protection. Nagzira Wildlife Sanctuary is within the Central Deccan Plateau dry deciduous forests ecoregion.

== Location ==
State: Maharashtra District: Gondia and Bhandara Tahsil: Situated in Arjuni (Sadak), Goregaon & Tirora Tahsils of Gondia District and Sakoli, Bhandara, Lakhni Tahsil of Bhandara district Circle: Geographically the area of this sanctuary comes under the Nagpur Circle of the State Forest Department. The administration and management of this sanctuary come under the control of the Chief Conservator of Forest (Wildlife), Nagpur. Division : The administration and management of this sanctuary come directly under Conservator of Forests (Wildlife), Bhandara and Gondia. Ranges: The area of this sanctuary comes under the Nagzira range.

== External and internal boundaries ==
The total length of the external boundary is 104.53 km out of which 74.93 km is an artificial boundary and 29.60 km length is natural boundary. As per the notification the external boundaries are as follows.

On the North - Revenue village boundary of the village Khursipar Berdipar, Belapur, Hamesha, Kodebarra, Mangaezari. On the East - Railway line Gondia to Chandrapur, Broad gauge section of South eastern Railway On the South - Pitezati fazal forests and Sakoli Range, village boundaries of Jamdi, Kosamtondi and Reserve Forest boundary. On the West - Village boundary of Bhajepar, Chorkhamara, Chorkhamara-Pangdi Cart track and Reserve Forest boundary.

=== Village boundary ===
Thadezari is the only village geographically situated inside the sanctuary. This village boundary coincides with the Compt. Boundary. At present the sanctuary area is not classified into various zonation. So the zonation boundaries do not exist. All these types of boundaries need to be demarcated and mapped permanently. The boundary demarcation within the sanctuary should be distinct from the normal forest boundary.

=== Ecological boundaries ===
The forest area surround the sanctuary is a self-sufficient ecosystem with its living fauna and flora. There is no marked difference between the vegetation and the topography of the surrounding areas with that of the sanctuary. As the present sanctuary area is small, it is not viable in itself. It is with these considerations the extension of this sanctuary is proposed and the same has been recommended by the Wildlife Institute of India's study in the "Protected Area (PA) Network" for the State.

== Forest types ==
The sanctuary has a diversity of plant community. The major forest type is "Southern Tropical Dry Deciduous Forests" – 5 A/c 3 as per Champion and Seth's Classification.

=== Mixed forests ===
They are rarely semi-evergreen in the hot season more or less without leaves. Thorny plants occur. Bamboos are often present on slopes. Grass is conspicuous, climbs are there. These forests occur over a large area in the sanctuary. Generally good quality forests are found in pockets on deep moist soils in valleys and along nallas. Erosion due to the incidence of grazing is seen on the outskirts of the sanctuary near villages. The average density of the crop in the stocked area is between 0.5 and 0.75. The crop in general is young to middle age, with few matured trees in the overwood. The major tree species are Terminalia tomentosa, Lagerstroemia parviflora, Anogeisus latifolia, Pterocarpus marsupium, Dispyrus melanoxylon, Tectona grandis, Bombax ceiba, Lannea grandis, BoswelIa serrata, Adina cordifolia, Xylia xylocarpa, along nallas Terinalia arjuna, Syzyguim cumini, Schleichera oleosa, Terinalia Chebula, Many Shrubs and Herbs like Holarrhena antidysentrica, Wrightia tinctoria. Woodfordia fructicosa, Helicteres isora etc. Climbers which are of common occurrence are Combretum decandrum, Zizyphus oenoplia, Calycopteris floribunda, Butea superba, Bauhinia vahlii, Smilax macrophylla, Mucuna pruriens, Acacia pinnata, Grass – Themeda quadrivalvia, Iseilema laxum. Apluda varia, Eragrostis tennella, Cynodon dactylon, Imperata cylindrica, near the lake – Vetiveria zizyniodes, Heteropogan contortus, Schima nervosum, etc. Bamboo on slope and along nallas.

=== Teak forests ===
These forests grow on hill slopes though their extent is not much. Besides this teak plantations, have been raised earlier. These can be seen interspersed with natural forest. The principal associates of the teak are Terminalia tomentosa, Anogeissus latifolica. Pterocarpus marsupium, Lagerstroemia spp.. Madhuca indica and Bamboo- Dendrocalamus strictus.

=== Grasslands ===
Grassland can be seen near Nagzira, but it is of small size and anthropogenic in origin. Earlier Nagzira Forest village was located here which was later on shifted to Thadezari in this grassland encroachment by woody plants is advancing and needs to be checked. Around 125 Ha. Of grasslands exists. These are located in compt. No. 95, 96, 97, 98, 121, 125, 126.

=== Bamboo ===
Bamboo occurs in abundance over the central portion of the sanctuary where deep soil combined with moisture is seen. They grow as middle storey in teak as well as mixed forests. There is no exploitation of Bamboo but illicit cutting is continuous threat and because of this Bamboo is either absent or of very poor quality in areas on the outer fringes of the sanctuary. It is evident that there is diversity in plant community. The communities have some distribution pattern, which has resulted into distribution of edges, interspersion and juxtaposition of habitats.

=== Species of conservation importance ===
This sanctuary serves as a living repository of various economical, medicinal, aromatic, ornamental plant species. Nearly 200 species of medicinal and economical importance are seen in this sanctuary. So far, there is no record of any endemic or rare species form this sanctuary. It is necessary to study the flora of this sanctuary in great detail for this purpose. The help of an expert in flora identification needs to be sought in this regard.

=== Weeds ===
The most common weeds seen in this sanctuary are Lantana camera (Ghaneri) which is an exotic shrub and Parthenium spp. (Congress grass) which is an exotic herb. Weed infestation though on small extent is seen in the compartment nos. 86, 96, 97, 101. 109, 112, 116, 125 and 128. The further spread of such weeds within the sanctuary should be checked and effective weed control methods like uprooting before flowering and then baring should be periodically cleared and be planted with suitable local fruit/fodder species useful for the existing wildlife. The species suggested are Mango, Bor, Sitaphal, Wad, Jambul, local varieties of palatable grasses etc.

== Museum ==
=== Museum and Interpretation Center ===
Presently a small museum at Nagzira tourist complex is being used for conservation education of tourists. Here varieties of stuffed birds are kept in showcases. Some animal models, butterflies are also displayed at museum. Also some photographs on wildlife, pugmarks, hoot-prints, plaster casts etc. are also exhibited to educate the tourists. This Museum is at its infancy and needs lot of further improvements. Very few tourists visit the museum / Interpretation Center.

=== Auditorium and audio-visual materials ===
Presently the museum/ interpretation center is used as an auditorium to screen informative films and slides on wildlife, forest and nature. At present there are 8 films that are lent out occasionally to other institutions like schools, colleges and other forest divisions. At present only one 16 mm film projector, one 35 mm slide projector, one overhead projector as well as two tape recorders are available with the sanctuary. As there is no electricity within the sanctuary, the generator is used to operate these facilities. Hence there is no need to develop facilities within the sanctuary.

=== Hides and machans ===
Currently there are five watch cabins and five watchtowers located within the sanctuary. These facilitate wildlife observation. The existing number of watch cabins/watchtowers is inadequate and there is a need to erect more watch cabins/watchtowers within the sanctuary during the plan period.
