= Desaiganj =

Desaiganj Wadsa
- Large Village
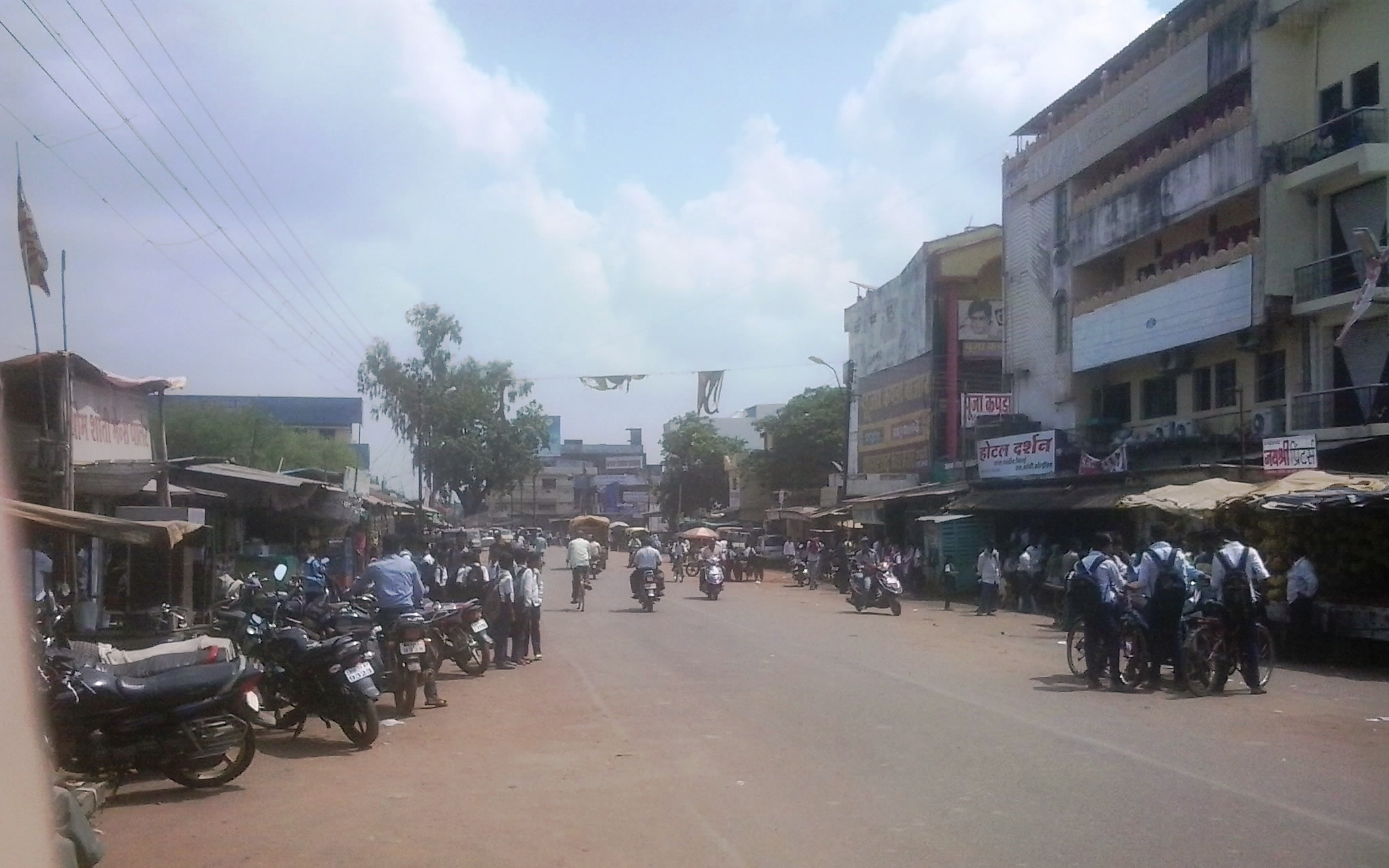
- Main Road

- Location in Maharashtra, India
- Coordinates: 20.6367°N 79.9859°E
- Country: India
- State: Maharashtra
- District: Gadchiroli

Government
  - Type: Municipal Council Class-3
  - Body: Desaiganj Municipal Council

Area
  - Total: 9 km^{2} (3.5 sq mi)

Population (2011)
  - Total: 28,781
  - Density: 3,200/km^{2} (8,300/sq mi)

Languages
  - Official: Marathi
- Time zone: UTC+5:30 (IST)
- Postal code: 441207
- Vehicle registration: MH-33

Desaiganj also known as Navi Wadsa (lit. New Wadsa) is a Large Village and a municipal council in the Wadsa taluka in Gadchiroli district in the state of Maharashtra, India. The village of Wadsa, now called Juni Wadsa (lit. Old Wadsa) lies 2 km to the south-west. The town is situated on the banks of river Wainganga.

== Demographics ==
As of the 2011 Indian census, Desaiganj has a population of 28,781 of which 14,388 are males while 14,393 are females. Literacy rate of Desaiganj is 88.38% higher than state average of 82.34%. In Desaiganj, Male literacy is around 93.58% while female literacy rate is 83.22%. The population with age of 0-6 is 3064, which is 10.65% of total population of Desaiganj.

Marathi is the most widely spoken language here.

Year	Male	Female	Total Population	Change	Religion (%)							
Year	Male	Female	Total Population	Change	Hindu	Muslim	Christian	Sikhs	Buddhist	Jain	Other religions and persuasions	Religion not stated
2001	12696	12097	24793	-	66.979	14.315	0.081	0.492	17.775	0.262	0.081	0.016
2011	14388	14393	28781	16.085	65.967	15.166	0.111	0.688	17.560	0.163	0.118	0.226

== Transport ==
It lies on National Highway-353C and National Highway-543. The town is served by Wadsa railway station, which lies on Chanda Fort–Gondia section of South East Central Railway.
