= Deori, Gondia =

Deori
- City
- Location in Maharashtra, India
- Coordinates: 21°04′21″N 80°22′1″E
- Country: India
- State: Maharashtra
- District: Gondia

Government
  - Type: Municipal Council
  - Body: Deori Municipal Council

Area
  - Total: 7 km^{2} (2.7 sq mi)
  - Rank: 5th in gondia district
- Elevation: 340 m (1,120 ft)

Population (2011)
  - Total: 14,579
  - Rank: 4th in Gondia
  - Density: 2,100/km^{2} (5,400/sq mi)

Languages
  - Official: Marathi
- Time zone: UTC+5:30 (IST)
- Postal code: 441901
- Vehicle registration: MH-35

Deori is a large village and a municipal council in Gondia district in the state of Maharashtra, India.

== Demographics ==
As per Indian government census of 2011, the population was 14579.

Year	Male	Female	Total Population	Change	Religion (%)							
Year	Male	Female	Total Population	Change	Hindu	Muslim	Christian	Sikhs	Buddhist	Jain	Other religions and persuasions	Religion not stated
2011	7394	7185	14579	-	76.096	7.922	0.240	1.989	12.299	0.583	0.370	0.501

View source data.

== Geography ==
Deori is located at 21°04′N 80°22′E. It has an average elevation of 340 metres (1118 feet).

It is located at the Maharashtra-Chhattisgarh border on Hajira-Kolkata National Highway 6.
