= Gondia district =

District of Maharashtra in India

- District of Maharashtra
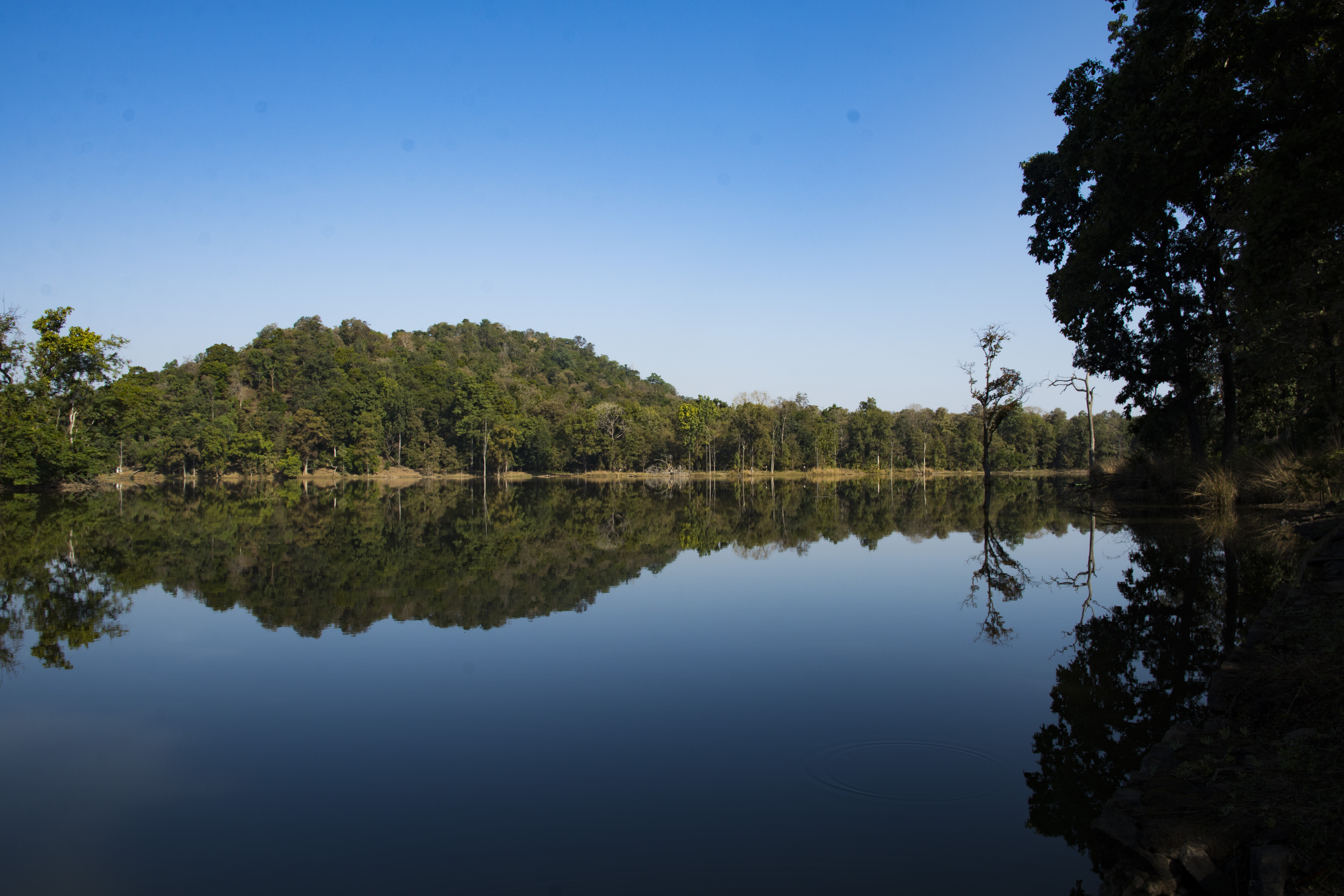
- Forest in Nagzira
- Interactive map of Gondia district
- Coordinates (Gondia): 21°27′41″N 80°11′29″E
- Country: India
- State: Maharashtra
- Division: Nagpur
- Established: 1 May 1999
- Headquarters: Gondia
- Tehsils: 1. Gondia, 2. Goregaon, 3. Tirora, 4. Arjuni Morgaon, 5. Deori, 6. Amgaon, 7. Salekasa, 8. Sadak Arjuni

Government
  - Body: Gondia Zilla Parishad
  - Guardian Minister: Aditi Tatkare (Cabinet Minister)
  - President Zilla Parishad: Layakram Bhendarkar
  - District collector: Prajit Nair (IAS)
  - CEO Zilla Parishad: Anil Patil (IAS)
  - MPs: Prashant Yadaorao Padole (Bhandara-Gondiya); Namdeo Kirsan (Gadchiroli–Chimur)

Area
  - Total: 5,234 km^{2} (2,021 sq mi)

Population (2011)
  - Total: 1,322,507
  - Density: 252.7/km^{2} (654.4/sq mi)
  - Urban: 17.08%

Demographics
  - Literacy: 85.41%
  - Sex ratio: 999
- Time zone: UTC+05:30 (IST)
- Vehicle registration: MH-35
- Major highways: NH 53, NH 543, NH 753, MSH 11, SH 249, SH 266, SH 275, SH 354, SH 366
- Average annual precipitation: 1197 mm
- Website: gondia.gov.in

Gondia district (also known as Gondiya, Marathi pronunciation: [ɡon̪d̪iaː]) is an administrative district in the state of Maharashtra in India. The district headquarters are located at Gondia. The district occupies an area of 5,234 km^{2} (2,021 sq mi) and has a population of 1,322,507, of which 17.08% were urban (as of 2011). Gondia district is located north eastern part of Maharashtra.

The district is part of the Nagpur Division. It is colloquially known as the "Rice City" due to its abundant rice production. Gondia is also known for the Navegaon-Nagzira Tiger Reserve, a major wildlife sanctuary in the Vidarbha region.

== Geography ==
The district is situated in the Vidarbha region of Maharashtra. It is bordered by the Balaghat district of Madhya Pradesh to the north, Rajnandgaon district of Chhattisgarh to the east, Gadchiroli district to the south, and Bhandara district to the west.

The Wainganga River is the most important river in the district, flowing towards the south. The district is rich in water bodies and dense forest cover, often referred to as the "Green Lung" of Vidarbha.

=== Climate ===
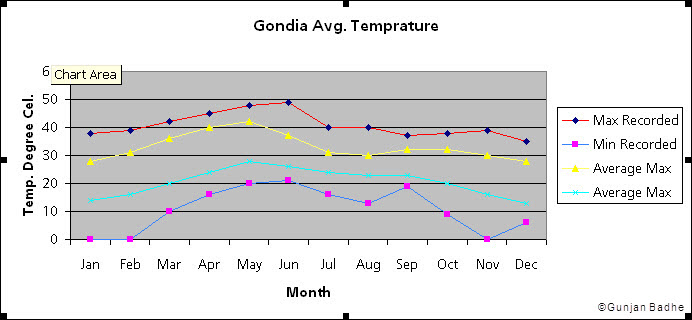
Gondia average temperature

Gondia experiences extreme variations in temperature with very hot summers and very cold winters and has an average relative humidity of 62 percent. Average recorded rainfall is more than 1,200 mm (47 in) in each rainy season (June to September).

May is the hottest month, when daytime temperature averages 42°C (108 °F), whereas the night temperature remains around 28 °C (82 °F). In recent times, the highest-recorded temperature in May has been 48 °C (118 °F), and the lowest May temperature has been 20 °C (68 °F).

The coolest months are December and January when temperatures reach highs of around 29 °C (84 °F) and lows of 13 °C (55 °F). The highest-recorded temperature in January was 38 °C (100 °F) and the lowest was 0 °C (32 °F).

Climate data for Gondia
Month	Jan	Feb	Mar	Apr	May	Jun	Jul	Aug	Sep	Oct	Nov	Dec	Year
Mean daily maximum °C (°F)	27.6 (81.7)	31.1 (88.0)	35.2 (95.4)	43.0 (109.4)	47.0 (116.6)	45.0 (113.0)	30.5 (86.9)	29.9 (85.8)	30.8 (87.4)	31.0 (87.8)	29.3 (84.7)	27.9 (82.2)	34.0 (93.2)
Mean daily minimum °C (°F)	13.3 (55.9)	15.4 (59.7)	19.6 (67.3)	24.6 (76.3)	28.9 (84.0)	27.4 (81.3)	24.3 (75.7)	24.1 (75.4)	23.9 (75.0)	21.2 (70.2)	15.2 (59.4)	9 (48)	20.6 (69.0)
Average precipitation mm (inches)	18.0 (0.71)	30.7 (1.21)	16.0 (0.63)	16.0 (0.63)	13.7 (0.54)	219.2 (8.63)	503.9 (19.84)	443.5 (17.46)	222.3 (8.75)	66.5 (2.62)	22.9 (0.90)	5.8 (0.23)	1,578.5 (62.15)
Source: Government of Maharashtra

== Demographics ==
Historical population
Year	Pop.	±% p.a.
1901	313,952	—
1911	366,186	+1.55%
1921	383,135	+0.45%
1931	440,170	+1.40%
1941	514,165	+1.57%
1951	572,142	+1.07%
1961	678,740	+1.72%
1971	854,527	+2.33%
1981	987,089	+1.45%
1991	1,086,221	+0.96%
2001	1,200,707	+1.01%
2011	1,322,507	+0.97%

Religions in Gondia district (2011)
Religion	Percent
Hinduism	87.25%
Buddhism	9.47%
Islam	1.98%
Other or not stated	1.30%

According to the 2011 census, Gondia district has a population of 1,322,507, roughly equal to the nation of Mauritius or the US state of New Hampshire. This gives it a ranking of 369th in India (out of a total of 640). The district has a population density of 253 inhabitants per square kilometre (660/sq mi). Its population growth rate during 2001–2011 was 10.13%. Gondia has a sex ratio of 996 females for every 1,000 males, and a literacy rate of 85.41%. 17.08% of the population live in urban areas. Scheduled Castes and Scheduled Tribes make up 13.31% and 16.20% of the population respectively.

=== Languages ===
Languages in Gondia district (2011)
1. Marathi (73.3%)
2. Hindi (10.1%)
3. Powari (4.70%)
4. Gondi (3.46%)
5. Lodhi (2.61%)
6. Chhattisgarhi (1.79%)
7. 'Other' Hindi (1.48%)
8. Others (2.59%)

At the time of the 2011 Census of India, 73.31% of the population in the district spoke Marathi, 10.06% Hindi, 4.70% Powari, 3.45% Gondi, 2.60% Lodhi and 1.79% Chhattisgarhi as their first language. 1.48% of the population recorded their language as 'Others' under Hindi.

== Government and politics ==
=== Members of Parliament ===
Prashant Yadaorao Padole represents Indian National Congress (INC) for the Bhandara-Gondiya constituency, while Namdeo Kirsan, also a member of Indian National Congress (INC) represents the Gadchiroli–Chimur constituency.

=== Guardian minister ===
Aditi Tatkare is the current Guardian Minister.

Following is a list of former guardian ministers:

- Rajkumar Badole (31 October 2014 – 8 November 2019)
- Anil Deshmukh (9 January 2020 – 5 April 2021)
- Nawab Malik (5 April 2021 – 27 March 2022)
- Prajakt Tanpure (27 March 2022 – 29 June 2022)
- Sudhir Mungantiwar (27 September 2022 – 4 October 2023)
- Dharamraobaba Bhagwantrao Aatram (4 October 2023 – 21 June 2024)
- Aditi Tatkare (21 June 2024 – Present)

=== Divisions ===
The district is divided into four sub-divisions, each of which is further divided into talukas. These are:

- Gondia sub-division: Gondia.
- Deori: Deori, Amgaon, and Salekasa talukas
- Tirora sub-division: Tirora and Goregaon talukas
- Arjuni Morgaon sub-division: Arjuni Morgaon and Sadak Arjuni talukas

The district also includes 556 gram panchayats (village councils), 8 panchayat samitis, and 954 revenue villages. The eight municipalities in this district are Gondia, Tirora, Arjuni Morgaon, Deori, Amgaon, Goregaon, Sadak Arjuni, and Salekasa.

The district has four Vidhan Sabha (legislative assembly) constituencies: Arjuni Morgaon (Scheduled castes), Gondiya, Tirora and Amgaon (Scheduled tribes). While the first three are part of Bhandara-Gondiya Lok Sabha constituency, the last one is part of Gadchiroli-Chimur (ST) Lok Sabha constituency.

== Tourism ==
The district is a significant destination for wildlife tourism in the Vidarbha region.

- Navegaon-Nagzira Tiger Reserve: This reserve was notified as the 46th Tiger Reserve of India. It comprises Navegaon National Park and Nagzira Wildlife Sanctuary. It is a biodiversity hotspot home to tigers, leopards, sloth bears, and over 300 species of birds.

== Transport ==
=== Rail ===
Gondia Junction railway station is a major railway hub located on the Howrah–Mumbai and New Delhi–Chennai trunk routes. It is an A-Grade station with lines diverging towards Balaghat-Jabalpur and Chandrapur.

=== Air ===
The district is served by Gondia Airport (Birsi Airport), located approximately 12 km from the city center. The airport is home to the National Flying Training Institute (NFTI), a joint venture between the Airports Authority of India and CAE, which trains pilots.
