= Gondia =

City in Maharashtra, India

Gondia Gondiya, Gundiya
- City
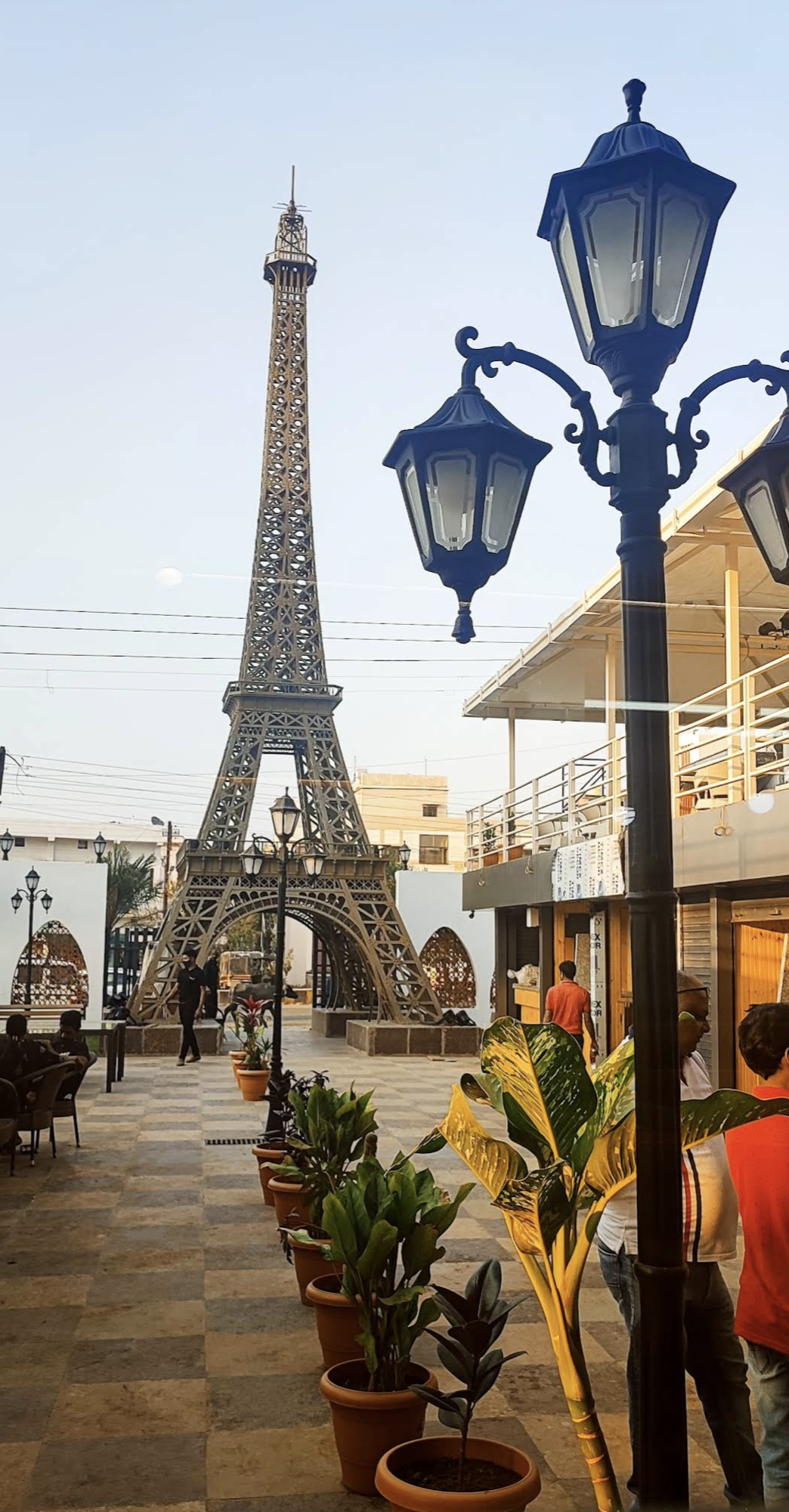
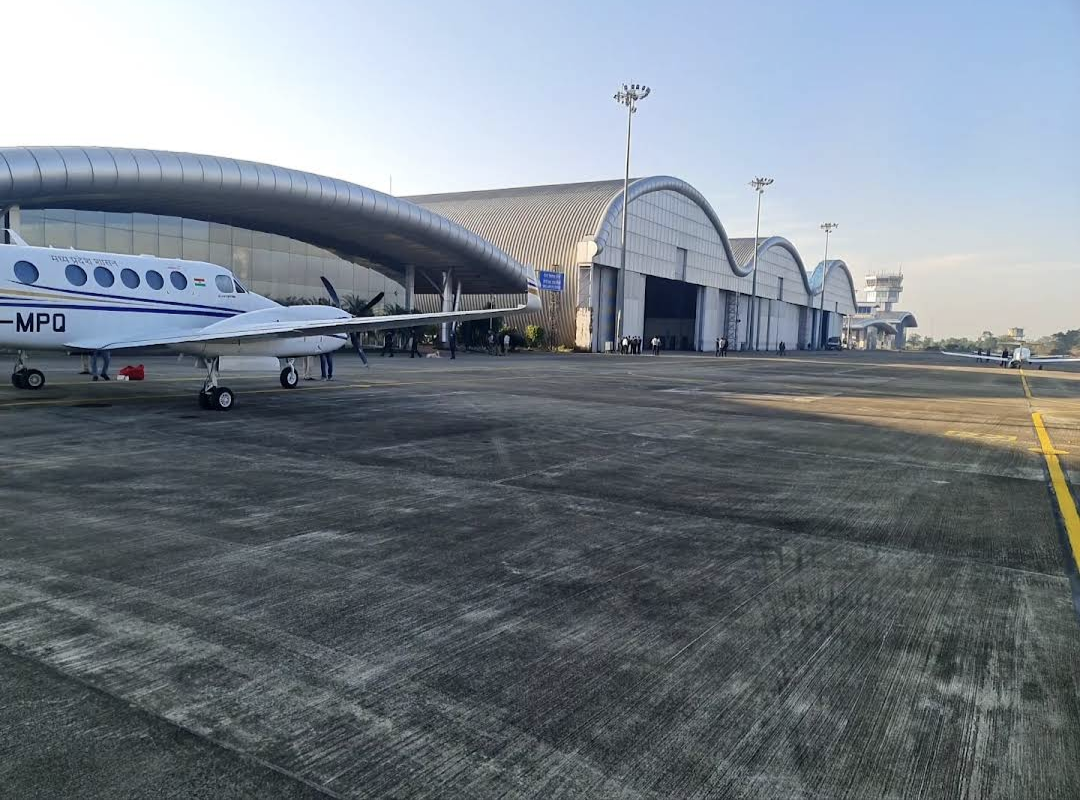
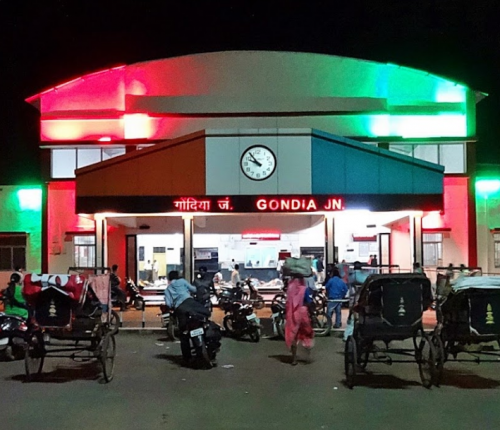
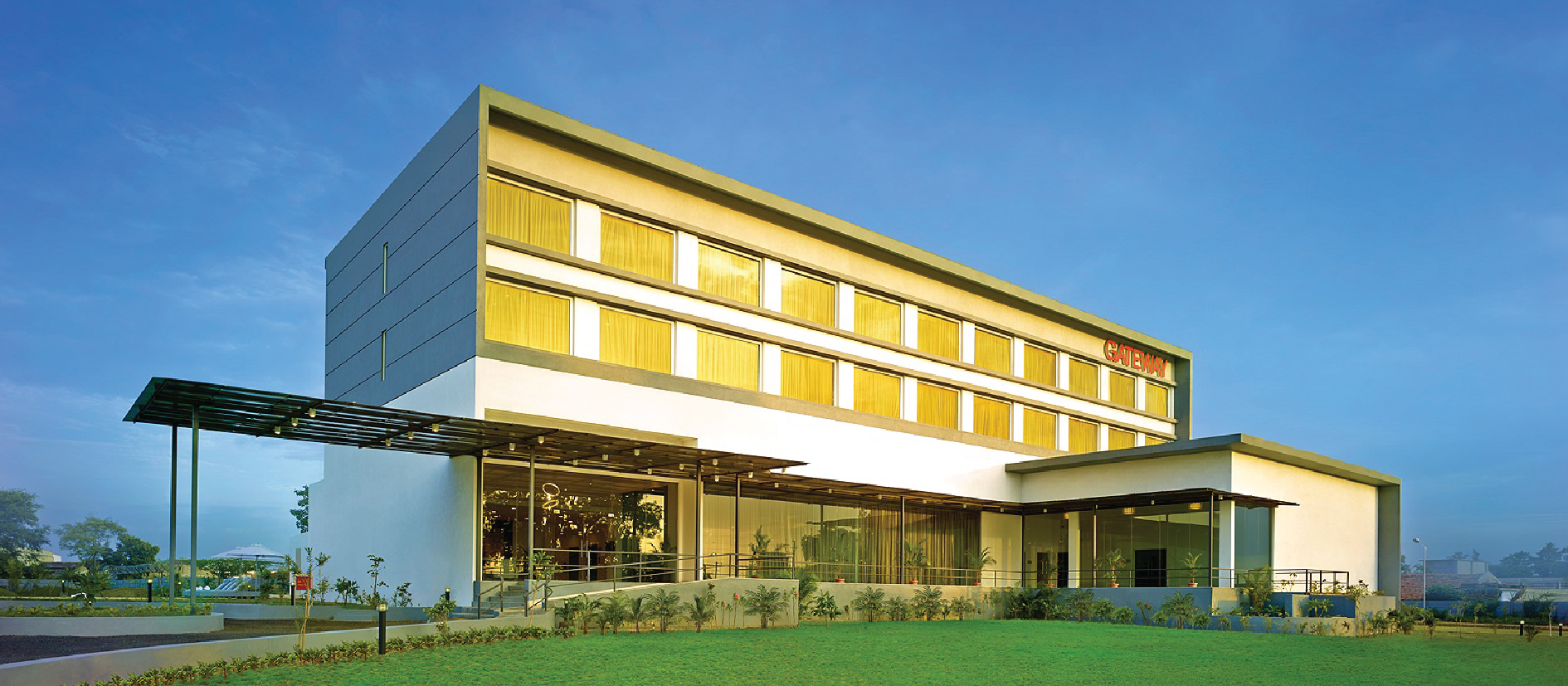
- From top, left to right: Gondia Airport, Gondia Junction, Gateway (Taj) Hotel, Mini Eiffel Tower
- Nickname: Rice city
- Interactive map of Gondia
- Coordinates: 21.4598°N 80.195°E
- Country: India
- State: Maharashtra
- District: Gondia

Government
  - Type: Municipal Council
  - Body: Gondia Municipal Council
  - District collector: Chinmay Gotmare, IAS
  - District Police Superintendent: Nikhil N. Pingale IPS

Area
  - Total: 55 km^{2} (21 sq mi)
  - Rank: 1st in Gondia District Vidarbha: 5th
- Elevation: 300 m (980 ft)

Population (2011)
  - Total: 132,821
  - Rank: 1st in Gondia District Vidharbha: 5th
  - Density: 2,400/km^{2} (6,300/sq mi)
- Demonym: Gondiakar
- Time zone: UTC+5:30 (IST)
- PIN: 441601,441614
- Telephone code: +91-07182
- Vehicle registration: MH-35
- Official language: Marathi
- Literacy Rate: 93.70%
- Sex ratio: 991 per 1000 male. ♂/♀
- HDI: ▲0.701 (Medium)
- Website: gondia.nic.in

Gondia (also spelled as Gondiya, Marathi pronunciation: [ɡon̪d̪iaː]) is a city and headquarters of eponymous Gondia District in Maharashtra, India. Gondia is also known as Rice City due to the abundance of rice mills in the area. Gondia Airport (also known as Birsi Airport) is the only airport in the district.

== History ==
The region is named after the Gondi people, an Adivasi group in central India.

During British rule in India, the Great Famine of 1876–78 provided an opportunity for the construction of a 150-kilometre-long (93 mi) metre-gauge rail link called the Nagpur Chhattisgarh Railway, connecting Nagpur with Rajnandgaon. Gondia railway station was created when this line began operation in December 1888. Bengal Nagpur Railway (BNR) was formed in 1887 to upgrade and extend this line, and in 1902 BNR was contracted to provide a railway line from Gondia to Jabalpur with branches from Nainpur to Mandla as well as Nainpur to Seoni and Chhindwara. With these links and the commerce they brought, Gondia grew and prospered. In the year 1877 Near Darekasa cave Swami Vivekananda occurred his "First Trance" reference book "Journey of Swami Vivekananda to Raipur and His First Trance"(23)

== Geography ==
=== Climate ===
Climate data for Gondia (1991–2020, extremes 1946–2020)
Month	Jan	Feb	Mar	Apr	May	Jun	Jul	Aug	Sep	Oct	Nov	Dec	Year
Record high °C (°F)	34.5 (94.1)	38.5 (101.3)	42.5 (108.5)	46.1 (115.0)	47.5 (117.5)	47.5 (117.5)	44.2 (111.6)	38.4 (101.1)	39.4 (102.9)	38.0 (100.4)	35.7 (96.3)	35.1 (95.2)	47.5 (117.5)
Mean daily maximum °C (°F)	28.3 (82.9)	31.6 (88.9)	36.3 (97.3)	40.2 (104.4)	42.6 (108.7)	37.3 (99.1)	31.2 (88.2)	30.4 (86.7)	32.1 (89.8)	32.7 (90.9)	31.0 (87.8)	29.1 (84.4)	33.5 (92.3)
Mean daily minimum °C (°F)	12.6 (54.7)	15.5 (59.9)	19.9 (67.8)	24.1 (75.4)	27.9 (82.2)	26.3 (79.3)	23.9 (75.0)	23.8 (74.8)	23.5 (74.3)	21.0 (69.8)	16.2 (61.2)	12.3 (54.1)	20.4 (68.7)
Record low °C (°F)	5.5 (41.9)	6.7 (44.1)	11.4 (52.5)	11.6 (52.9)	13.8 (56.8)	19.8 (67.6)	18.0 (64.4)	18.3 (64.9)	19.2 (66.6)	13.3 (55.9)	8.5 (47.3)	5.0 (41.0)	5.0 (41.0)
Average rainfall mm (inches)	18.5 (0.73)	17.6 (0.69)	19.6 (0.77)	12.0 (0.47)	8.3 (0.33)	157.4 (6.20)	406.0 (15.98)	365.5 (14.39)	188.1 (7.41)	43.4 (1.71)	10.6 (0.42)	6.7 (0.26)	1,253.9 (49.37)
Average rainy days	1.2	1.4	1.8	1.1	0.9	8.1	16.4	16.9	8.8	3.0	0.7	0.1	60.4
Average relative humidity (%) (at 17:30 IST)	46	37	31	29	26	53	73	79	82	58	54	47	51
Source 1: India Meteorological Department
Source 2: Government of Maharashtra

=== Location ===
Gondia is very close to the state of Madhya Pradesh, Chhattisgarh and is considered the gateway to Maharashtra from central and eastern India. Tirora is only nearby city. Gondia municipal council was established in 1920. At that time Gondia had only 10 wards population up to 20,000 and an area of 7.5 km^{2}. Gondia has 42 wards, as well as population nearing up to 2 lakhs. The urbanisation has crossed municipal limits merging into nearby villages like Kudwa, Katangi, Fulchur, Nagra, Karanja, Murri, Pindkepar, and Khamari. The Ministry of Urban Development has recently announced to merge 20 nearby villages into Gondia to give the city status of Municipal Corporation. It is connected with National Highway 543 and 753.

== Demographics ==
According to the 2011 census, Gondia municipal corporation had a total population of 132,889, of which 66,756 were males and 66,133 females. Children in the age range of 0 to 6 were 12,835. The effective literacy (of population 7 years and above) of the city was 93.70%.

Year	Male	Female	Total Population	Change	Religion (%)							
Year	Male	Female	Total Population	Change	Hindu	Muslim	Christian	Sikhs	Buddhist	Jain	Other religions and persuasions	Religion not stated
2001	61418	59484	120902	-	77.072	7.147	0.524	0.779	13.508	0.817	0.137	0.015
2011	66500	66313	132813	9.90	76.228	7.483	0.472	0.760	13.804	0.692	0.088	0.473

== Economy ==
=== Agriculture ===
The city has a large number of rice mills. Agriculture is the main economic activity in Gondia. The main agricultural crops are paddy and sugarcane.

=== Industries ===
Adani Power Maharashtra Limited (APML), is 3 km away from Tirora on Tirora-Gondia state road. Coal is transported to Adani power, Ltd through a railway which is connected to Kachewani Railway Station. Water is being used from nearby weir constructed on Wainganga River. An 85.89% subsidiary of Adani Power Limited is implementing 3300 MW Thermal Power Station in Tirora.

== Transportation ==
=== Road ===
The Mumbai–Nagpur–Kolkata Road is the only national highway passing through the district, covering a total distance of 99.37 km (62 mi). Gondia is situated about 170 km by road from Nagpur of Vidarbha region. The district has road links to adjoining districts Chandrapur, Bhandara, Nagpur. The city is well connected by roads. It takes around 4 hours journey from Nagpur by State Transport Bus to reach Gondia. Gondia has bus connectivity to Jabalpur, Nagpur, Raipur and Hyderabad.

=== Rail ===
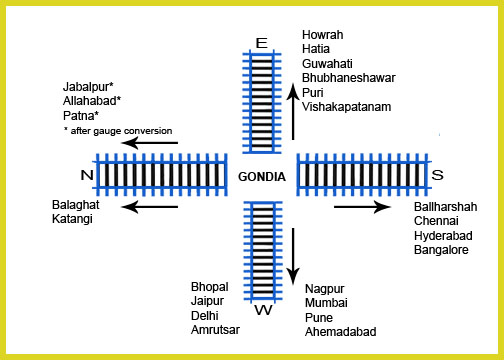
Gondia rail routes

Gondia Junction railway station is a junction in Maharashtra, with heavy passenger and goods traffic. It is an A-Grade station.

It lies on the Howrah–Mumbai route. The station has seven platforms, each with potable water, tea stalls, benches and waiting sheds. There is also a fruit stall and a bookstall. The station is equipped with air-conditioned waiting rooms for passengers travelling by upper accommodation classes and a waiting hall for passengers travelling by lower accommodation classes.

The Gondia–Jabalpur Junction (Madhya Pradesh) section of South East Central Railway runs north–south, along the valley of the Wainganga River. The line was formerly narrow gauge (762 mm [2 ft 6 in]) along its entire length, but the section between Gondia and Balaghat was converted to broad gauge in 2005–2006, connecting Balaghat to India's national broad-gauge network. Work is completed to convert the Balaghat–Jabalpur section to broad gauge as well.

Railway milestones for Gondia include:

- 1888 – Gondia Railway Station was opened to the public.
- 1901 – Satpura Express began first class service.
- 1903 – The first portion of Gondia–Nainpur was opened.
- 1905 – Nainpur–Gondia line was extended to Jabalpur.
- 1908 – Gondia–Nagbhir–Nagpur line was opened for traffic.
- 1990-91 – Paniajob–Gondia and Gondia–Bhandara Road sections were electrified.
- 1999 – Gauge-converted Gondia–Balharshah line opened.
- 2005 – Gauge-converted Gondia–Balaghat section opened.

=== Airport ===
Gondia Airport is situated near Kamtha village, 12 km (7.5 mi) from Gondia. This airstrip was built by the British in 1940, during World War II. Initially run by the Public Works Department, it was taken over by the state-owned Maharashtra Industrial Development Corporation (MIDC) from August 1998 to December 2005, after which it has been operated by the Airports Authority of India (AAI). The airport's runway has been extended to 2,300 metres (7,500 ft) to accommodate Airbus A-320, Boeing 737 and similar aircraft.

Other nearby airports to Gondia Airport (GDB) include Nagpur (NAG) (124.8 km), Raipur (RPR) (163.2 km) and Jabalpur (JLR) (192.2 km).
