= Bhandara Assembly constituency =

Constituency of the Maharashtra legislative assembly in India

Coordinates: 21.17°N 79.65°E

Bhandara
- Constituency No. 61 for the Maharashtra Legislative Assembly

Constituency details
- Country: India
- Region: Western India
- State: Maharashtra
- District: Bhandara
- Lok Sabha constituency: Bhandara–Gondiya
- Established: 1951
- Total electors: 379,252
- Reservation: SC

Member of Legislative Assembly
- 15th Maharashtra Legislative Assembly
- Incumbent Narendra Bhondekar
- Party: SHS
- Alliance: NDA
- Elected year: 2024

Bhandara Assembly constituency is one of the 288 Vidhan Sabha (legislative assembly) constituencies in Maharashtra state in central India. This constituency is one of the three constituencies located in Bhandara district.

== Overview ==
Bhandara is part of the Bhandara-Gondiya Lok Sabha constituency along with five other Vidhan Sabha segments, namely Sakoli and Tumsar in the Bhandara district and Gondiya, Arjuni Morgaon and Tirora in the Gondia district.

== Geographical boundaries ==
The current constituency comprises the whole of Bhandara and Pauni Tehsils including Bhandara and Pauni municipalities.

== Members of Legislative assembly ==
Year	Name	Party
1952	Ram Lanjewar	Indian National Congress
1957	Sitaram Bhambore	Indian National Congress
1957	Dada Dhote	Indian National Congress
1962	Dada Dhote	Indian National Congress
1967	Dada Dhote	Independent
1968^	Nasikrao Tirpude	Indian National Congress
1972	Govind Shende	Independent
1978	Vitthalprasad Dube	Indian National Congress (I)
1980	Madhavrao Dalal	Independent
1985	Anandrao Wanjari	Indian National Congress
1990	Ram Gopal Aswale	Bharatiya Janata Party
1995	Ram Gopal Aswale	Bharatiya Janata Party
1999	Ram Gopal Aswale	Bharatiya Janata Party
2004	Nana Panchbudhe	Nationalist Congress Party
2009	Narendra Bhondekar	Shiv Sena
2014	Ramchandra Avsare	Bharatiya Janata Party
2019	Narendra Bhondekar	Independent
2024	Narendra Bhondekar	Shiv Sena

== Election results ==
=== Assembly Election 2024 ===
2024 Maharashtra Legislative Assembly election : Bhandara
Party	Candidate	Votes	%	±%
SHS	Narendra Bhondekar	127,884	49.26%	New
INC	Puja Ganesh (Balu) Thavakar	89,517	34.48%	▲26.23
Independent	Narendra Shankarrao Pahade	24,196	9.32%	New
BSP	Balak Ekanath Gajbhiye	5,041	1.94%	▼0.89
VBA	Arun Jadho Gondane	3,148	1.21%	▼2.66
Independent	Premsagar Nilkanth Ganvir	3,060	1.18%	New
NOTA	None of the Above	2,354	0.91%	▼0.17
Independent	Devangana Vijay Gadhave	1,984	0.76%	New
Margin of victory		38,367	14.78%	▲4.56
Turnout		2,61,971	69.08%	▲6.03
Total valid votes		2,59,617		
Registered electors		3,79,252		▲2.20
SS gain from Independent		Swing	▲5.35	

=== Assembly Election 2019 ===
2019 Maharashtra Legislative Assembly election : Bhandara
Party	Candidate	Votes	%	±%
Independent	Narendra Bhondekar	101,717	43.91%	New
BJP	Arvind Manohar Bhaladhare	78,040	33.69%	▼2.22
INC	Jaideep Jogendra Kawade	19,105	8.25%	▼4.95
Independent	Prashant Balak Ramteke	9,878	4.26%	New
VBA	Visarjan (Vinod) Sajjan Chausare (Sevak)	8,963	3.87%	New
BSP	Dilip Bhajandas Motghare	6,566	2.83%	▼17.22
NOTA	None of the Above	2,494	1.08%	▲0.38
Independent	Sadanand Januji Koche	1,633	0.70%	New
Margin of victory		23,677	10.22%	▼5.63
Turnout		2,34,420	63.17%	▼5.66
Total valid votes		2,31,654		
Registered electors		3,71,088		▲8.76
Independent gain from BJP		Swing	▲8.00	

=== Assembly Election 2014 ===
2014 Maharashtra Legislative Assembly election : Bhandara
Party	Candidate	Votes	%	±%
BJP	Ramchandra Punaji Avsare	83,408	35.91%	New
BSP	Dewangana Vijay Gadhave	46,576	20.05%	▲7.65
SS	Narendra Bhondekar	42,766	18.41%	▼34.17
INC	Yuvraj Dewaji Wasnik	30,655	13.20%	New
NCP	Sachchidanand Hiraman Fulekar	15,243	6.56%	▼19.92
CPI	Hiwraj Bhikulal Ukey	3,290	1.42%	New
MNS	Manohar Shioprasad Kharole	2,262	0.97%	New
NOTA	None of the Above	1,621	0.70%	New
Margin of victory		36,832	15.86%	▼10.24
Turnout		2,34,606	68.76%	▲3.14
Total valid votes		2,32,294		
Registered electors		3,41,185		▲12.14
BJP gain from SS		Swing	▼16.67	

=== Assembly Election 2009 ===
2009 Maharashtra Legislative Assembly election : Bhandara
Party	Candidate	Votes	%	±%
SS	Narendra Bhondekar	103,880	52.58%	New
NCP	Mahendra Husanji Gadkari	52,326	26.48%	▼6.30
BSP	Moreshwar Ramaji Meshram	24,499	12.40%	▼17.90
RPI(A)	Sachchidanand Hiraman Fulekar	8,173	4.14%	New
Independent	Nitin Pundalikrao Tumane	2,645	1.34%	New
Independent	Ravindra Santosh Ramteke	1,717	0.87%	New
Margin of victory		51,554	26.09%	▲25.25
Turnout		1,97,679	64.98%	▼8.44
Total valid votes		1,97,581		
Registered electors		3,04,236		▲69.14
SS gain from NCP		Swing	▲19.80	

=== Assembly Election 2004 ===
2004 Maharashtra Legislative Assembly election : Bhandara
Party	Candidate	Votes	%	±%
NCP	Nana Jairam Panchabudhe	43,269	32.78%	▲18.21
BJP	Ram Gopal Aswale	42,158	31.94%	▼5.15
BSP	Raju Manikrao Karemore	40,000	30.30%	▲29.22
Independent	Sadashio Sadhooji Shende	2,300	1.74%	New
SP	Abhay Raghunath Bramhankar	1,348	1.02%	New
BBM	Asha Maroti Bodele	857	0.65%	New
Independent	Vaidya Sunil Rambhau	844	0.64%	New
Margin of victory		1,111	0.84%	▼10.19
Turnout		1,32,143	73.46%	▲3.83
Total valid votes		1,32,004		
Registered electors		1,79,877		▲16.10
NCP gain from BJP		Swing	▼4.31	

=== Assembly Election 1999 ===
1999 Maharashtra Legislative Assembly election : Bhandara
Party	Candidate	Votes	%	±%
BJP	Ram Gopal Aswale	39,968	37.09%	▼8.89
INC	Anandrao Tukaramji Wanjari	28,079	26.06%	▼0.12
NCP	Dhananjay Madhaorao Dalal	15,698	14.57%	New
Independent	Shahare (Guruji) Ramdas Jagannath	13,184	12.23%	New
Independent	Charan Waghmare	7,933	7.36%	New
Independent	Idris (Mamu) Munir Sheikh	1,250	1.16%	New
Margin of victory		11,889	11.03%	▼8.77
Turnout		1,12,422	72.56%	▼12.42
Total valid votes		1,07,766		
Registered electors		1,54,937		▲0.36
BJP hold		Swing	▼8.89	

=== Assembly Election 1995 ===
1995 Maharashtra Legislative Assembly election : Bhandara
Party	Candidate	Votes	%	±%
BJP	Aswale Ram Gopal	58,194	45.98%	▲14.63
INC	Vairagade Jayant Vasantrao	33,131	26.18%	▼1.26
Independent	Ganvir Manohar Chandan	10,910	8.62%	New
JD	Bhiogade Ashok Hariram	10,748	8.49%	▼16.07
CPI	Bante Madhaorao Tulshiram	6,682	5.28%	New
Independent	Kangale Ramesh Zibal	1,659	1.31%	New
Independent	Chakole Vinayak Gopalrao	1,082	0.85%	New
Margin of victory		25,063	19.80%	▲15.89
Turnout		1,30,149	84.30%	▲16.02
Total valid votes		1,26,562		
Registered electors		1,54,383		▲8.75
BJP hold		Swing	▲14.63	

=== Assembly Election 1990 ===
1990 Maharashtra Legislative Assembly election : Bhandara
Party	Candidate	Votes	%	±%
BJP	Aswale Ram Gopal	29,356	31.35%	New
INC	Jayant Vasant Vairagade	25,693	27.44%	▼10.77
JD	Ashok Hariramji Bhiogade	22,998	24.56%	New
RPI(K)	Charandas Ganpat Meshram	5,370	5.73%	▼10.73
Independent	Kamlesh Gangaram Kanoje	3,206	3.42%	New
Independent	Dhurve Arun Anandrao	1,986	2.12%	New
Independent	Yadavrao Maroti Gate	1,198	1.28%	New
Margin of victory		3,663	3.91%	▼13.34
Turnout		95,097	66.99%	▼2.39
Total valid votes		93,643		
Registered electors		1,41,966		▲26.85
BJP gain from INC		Swing	▼6.86	

=== Assembly Election 1985 ===
1985 Maharashtra Legislative Assembly election : Bhandara
Party	Candidate	Votes	%	±%
INC	Anandrao Tukaramji Wanjari	29,225	38.21%	New
IC(S)	Dhananjay Madhaorao Dalal	16,033	20.96%	New
Independent	Gaidhane Ramaji Sakharam	14,657	19.16%	New
RPI(K)	Kale Hiraman Shankar	12,593	16.46%	▲2.70
Independent	Zanjade Sudhakar Ganpati	1,532	2.00%	New
Independent	Uparade Jayram Dandu	1,139	1.49%	New
Independent	Rambhau Tukaram Sakharkar	658	0.86%	New
Margin of victory		13,192	17.25%	▲12.79
Turnout		77,676	69.41%	▲7.28
Total valid votes		76,490		
Registered electors		1,11,913		▲7.81
INC gain from Independent		Swing	▼1.86	

=== Assembly Election 1980 ===
1980 Maharashtra Legislative Assembly election : Bhandara
Party	Candidate	Votes	%	±%
Independent	Dalal Madhavrao Tulsiram	25,395	40.06%	New
INC(I)	Ram Hedaoo	22,570	35.61%	▼5.29
RPI(K)	Shahare Janabai Sundarlal	8,727	13.77%	New
Independent	Nandurkar Shamrao Atmamram	6,037	9.52%	New
Independent	Shahane Avinash Bhaskar	441	0.70%	New
Margin of victory		2,825	4.46%	▼6.75
Turnout		64,578	62.21%	▼16.21
Total valid votes		63,387		
Registered electors		1,03,804		▲7.13
Independent gain from INC(I)		Swing	▼0.83	

=== Assembly Election 1978 ===
1978 Maharashtra Legislative Assembly election : Bhandara
Party	Candidate	Votes	%	±%
INC(I)	Dube Vithalprasad Sitaram	30,621	40.89%	New
INC	Shende Govinda (Dada) Ramji	22,230	29.69%	▼4.93
JP	Deshkar Shalini Madhukar	13,182	17.60%	New
Independent	Bhiogade Ashok Hariram	7,074	9.45%	New
Independent	Raut Madhukar Ramji	1,153	1.54%	New
Margin of victory		8,391	11.21%	▼13.50
Turnout		76,998	79.46%	▲1.70
Total valid votes		74,880		
Registered electors		96,897		▲4.64
INC(I) gain from Independent		Swing	▼18.42	

=== Assembly Election 1972 ===
1972 Maharashtra Legislative Assembly election : Bhandara
Party	Candidate	Votes	%	±%
Independent	Govind Ramji Shende	41,511	59.31%	New
INC	Tirpude N. Khantadu	24,224	34.61%	New
RPI(K)	Banson Bhanudasji Sego	3,585	5.12%	New
RPI	Shriram Suryabhan Jkey	665	0.95%	New
Margin of victory		17,287	24.70%	
Turnout		72,053	77.81%	
Total valid votes		69,985		
Registered electors		92,603		
Independent gain from INC		Swing		

=== Assembly By-election 1968 ===
1968 Maharashtra Legislative Assembly by-election : Bhandara
Party	Candidate	Votes	%	±%
INC	T. R. Khanntadu	35,225		
ABJS	N. B. R. Baliram	18,461		
Independent	S. Sappasingh	659		New
Independent	S. Sappasingh	659		New
Margin of victory		16,764		
Turnout				
Total valid votes		0		
INC gain from Independent		Swing		

=== Assembly Election 1967 ===
1967 Maharashtra Legislative Assembly election : Bhandara
Party	Candidate	Votes	%	±%
Independent	Dada Da Jibaji Dhote	27,915	46.44%	New
INC	N. K. Tirapude	21,608	35.95%	▼6.2
RPI	H. A. Khobaragade	8,681	14.44%	▼12.39
Independent	S. B. Parasodkar	800	1.33%	New
ABJS	N. T. Hedawoo	588	0.98%	▼6.95
Margin of victory		6,307	10.49%	▼4.83
Turnout		64,489	76.61%	▲8.96
Total valid votes		60,105		
Registered electors		84,177		▲24.10
Independent gain from INC		Swing	▲4.29	

=== Assembly Election 1962 ===
1962 Maharashtra Legislative Assembly election : Bhandara
Party	Candidate	Votes	%	±%
INC	Dada Da Jibaji Dhote	17,855	42.15%	▲16.51
RPI	Sadanand Mangalram Ramteke	11,364	26.83%	New
Independent	Sakharam Balaji Parshodkar	9,780	23.09%	New
ABJS	Bhaskarrao Baliram Ninawe	3,358	7.93%	New
Margin of victory		6,491	15.32%	▲14.70
Turnout		46,385	68.39%	▼56.11
Total valid votes		42,357		
Registered electors		67,828		▼43.35
INC hold		Swing	▲16.51	

=== Assembly Election 1957 ===
1957 Bombay State Legislative Assembly election : Bhandara
Party	Candidate	Votes	%	±%
INC	Bhambore Sitaram Jairam (Sc)	36,407	25.65%	▼21.03
INC	Dhote Dada Dajiba	35,521	25.02%	▼21.65
SCF	Bansod Bhanudas Sego (Sc)	22,826	16.08%	▼5.4
SCF	Rahate Dinkar Modku (Sc)	20,309	14.31%	▼7.18
PSP	Dandekar Vinayaka Sakharam	11,048	7.78%	New
PSP	Motghare Premlal Fursud (Sc)	10,269	7.23%	New
Independent	Wasnik Pandurang Nagorao (Sc)	2,328	1.64%	New
Margin of victory		886	0.62%	▼20.25
Turnout		1,41,951	118.56%	▲58.47
Total valid votes		1,41,951		
Registered electors		1,19,733		▲177.24
INC hold		Swing	▼21.03	

=== Assembly Election 1952 ===
1952 Madhya Pradesh Legislative Assembly election : Bhandara
Party	Candidate	Votes	%	±%
INC	Rama Bakaram Lanjewar	12,113	46.68%	New
Independent	Ganpatrao Yadeorao Pande	6,695	25.80%	New
SCF	Kewaldas Maniram Ramteke	5,575	21.48%	New
Independent	Shravan Laxman Kadeo	1,287	4.96%	New
Independent	Pandurang Nagorao	281	1.08%	New
Margin of victory		1,120		
Turnout		25,951	60.09%	
Total valid votes		25,951		
Registered electors		43,188		
Independent win (new seat)				

== See also ==
- Bhandara
- List of constituencies of Maharashtra Vidhan Sabha
