= Bhandara–Gondiya Lok Sabha constituency =

Lok Sabha Constituency in Maharashtra

Coordinates: 21.3°N 79.9°E

Bhandara–Gondia MH-11
- Lok Sabha constituency
- Bhandara-Gondiya Lok Sabha Constituency map

Constituency details
- Country: India
- Region: Western India
- State: Maharashtra
- Assembly constituencies: Tumsar; Bhandara; Sakoli; Arjuni Morgaon; Tirora; Gondia
- Established: 1952
- Total electors: 18,27,188 (2024)
- Reservation: None

Member of Parliament
- 18th Lok Sabha
- Incumbent Prashant Yadaorao Padole
- Party: Indian National Congress
- Elected year: 2024
- Preceded by: Sunil Baburao Mendhe

Bhandara–Gondia Lok Sabha constituency is one of the 48 Lok Sabha (parliamentary) constituencies of Maharashtra state in western India. This constituency came into existence in 2008 as a part of the implementation of the Presidential notification on delimitation of parliamentary constituencies, based on the recommendations of the Delimitation Commission of India constituted in 2002 and Bhandara Lok Sabha constituency ceased to exist. Three of its assembly segments are in Bhandara district, while the other three are in Gondia district.(Member of parliament) resigned recently (2014-2017).

== Assembly segments ==
Presently, Bhandara–Gondia Lok Sabha constituency comprises six Vidhan Sabha (legislative assembly) segments. These segments with constituency number and reservations (if any) are:

#	Name	District	Member	Party	Leading (in 2024)
60	Tumsar	Bhandara	Raju Karemore	NCP	INC
61	Bhandara (SC)	Bhandara	Narendra Bhondekar	SHS	INC
62	Sakoli	Bhandara	Nana Patole	INC	INC
63	Arjuni-Morgaon (SC)	Gondia	Rajkumar Badole	NCP	INC
64	Tirora	Gondia	Vijay Rahangdale	BJP	BJP
65	Gondia	Gondia	Vinod Agrawal	BJP	BJP

== Members of Parliament ==
Year	Name	Party
Until 2009 : See Bhandara Constituency
2009	Praful Patel	Nationalist Congress Party
2014	Nana Patole	Bharatiya Janata Party
2018^	Madhukar Kukde	Nationalist Congress Party
2019	Sunil Mendhe	Bharatiya Janata Party
2024	Prashant Yadaorao Padole	Indian National Congress

^ by poll

== Election results ==
=== 2024 ===
2024 Indian general election: Bhandara-Gondia
Party	Candidate	Votes	%	±%
INC	Dr. Prashant Yadaorao Padole	587,413	47.56	▲47.56
BJP	Sunil Baburao Mendhe	5,50,033	44.53	▼7.70
BSP	Kumbhalkar Sanjay Bhaiyy	25,462	2.06	▼2.17
VBA	Sanjay Gajanan Kewat	24,858	2.01	N/A
Independent	Sewakbhau Nirdhan Waghaye	13,103	1.06	N/A
NOTA	None of the Above	10,268	0.83	N/A
Majority		37,380	3.03	▼12.82
Turnout		12,35,073	67.59	▼1.22
INC gain from BJP		Swing		

=== 2019 ===
2019 Indian general elections: Bhandara-Gondia
Party	Candidate	Votes	%	±%
BJP	Sunil Baburao Mendhe	650,243	52.23	▲10.69
NCP	Nana Panchbudhe	4,52,849	36.28	▼10.33
BSP	Dr. Vijaya Rajesh Nandurkar	52,659	4.23	N/A
Majority		1,97,394	15.85	▲10.78
Turnout		12,46,543	68.81	▲14.89
BJP gain from NCP		Swing		

=== Bye election 2018 ===
Bye-election, 2018: Bhandara-Gondia
Party	Candidate	Votes	%	±%
NCP	Madhukarrao Yashwantrao Kukde	442,213	46.61	▲8.45
BJP	Hemant Shrawan Patle (Tanubhau)	3,94,116	41.54	▼9.08
BBM	L. K. Madavi	40,326	4.25	N/A
IND.	Ramvilash Shobhelal Maskare	9,454	1.00	N/A
IND.	Kashiram Jagan Gajbe	8,204	0.86	N/A
NOTA	None of the Above	6,602	0.70	▲0.36
Majority		48,097	5.07	▼
Turnout		9,48,849	53.92	▼18.39
NCP gain from Independent		Swing		

=== General elections 2014 ===
2014 Indian general elections: Bhandara-Gondia
Party	Candidate	Votes	%	±%
BJP	Nana Patole	606,129	50.62	▲35.20
NCP	Praful Patel	4,56,875	38.16	▼9.36
BSP	Sanjay Nasare	50,958	4.26	▼11.16
AAP	Prashant Mishra	8,647	0.72	New
Majority		1,49,254	12.46	▼11.98
Turnout		11,97,398	72.31	▲1.25
Independent gain from NCP		Swing		

=== General elections 2009 ===
2009 Indian general elections: Bhandara-Gondia
Party	Candidate	Votes	%	±%
NCP	Praful Manoharbhai Patel	489,814	47.52	
IND	Nanabhau Falgunrao Patole	2,37,899	23.08	
BJP	Shishupal Natthu Patle	1,58,938	15.42	
BSP	Virendrakumar Kasturchand Jaiswal	68,246	6.62	
IND	Bhaskarrao Mahadeorao Jibhakate	9,243	0.90	
Majority		2,51,915	24.44	
Turnout		10,30,750	71.06	
NCP gain from Independent		Swing		

=== By elections 1954 (Note: as Bhandara) ===
1954 Indian Lok Sabha by-election: Bhandara
Party	Candidate	Votes	%	±%
PSP	Ashok Ranjitram Mehta	149,636	21.67	N/A
INC	B.N. Arjun	1,41,164	20.44	N/A
SCF	Bhimrao Ambedkar	1,32,483	19.19	N/A
INC	R.P. Sambhuram	1,24,267	18.00	N/A
Majority		8,681	1.23	N/A
Turnout		547,549	79.3	N/A
PSP gain from INC		Swing		

== See also ==
- Bhandara Lok Sabha constituency ( 1951 to 2004 elections for 1st to 14th Lok Sabha )
- Gondia Lok Sabha constituency ( 1962 election to 3rd Lok Sabha)
- Bhandara district
- Gondia district
- List of constituencies of the Lok Sabha
