= Sakoli Assembly constituency =

Coordinates: 21.09°N 80.00°E

Sakoli
- Constituency No. 62 for the Maharashtra Legislative Assembly

Constituency details
- Country: India
- Region: Western India
- State: Maharashtra
- District: Bhandara
- Lok Sabha constituency: Bhandara–Gondiya
- Established: 1952
- Total electors: 328,909
- Reservation: None

Member of Legislative Assembly
- 15th Maharashtra Legislative Assembly
- Incumbent Nana Patole
- Party: INC
- Alliance: MVA
- Elected year: 2024

Sakoli Assembly constituency is one of the 288 Maharashtra Vidhan Sabha (legislative assembly) constituencies in Maharashtra state in central India. This constituency is one of the three constituencies located in Bhandara district.

Sakoli is part of the Bhandara-Gondiya Lok Sabha constituency along with five other Vidhan Sabha constituencies, namely Bhandara and Tumsar in Bhandara district and Gondiya, Arjuni Morgaon and Tirora in Gondia district.

== Members of Legislative assembly ==
Year	Member	Party
1952	Nashikrao Khantadu Tirpude; Arjun Ganaji Sanrit	Indian National Congress
1957	Nashikrao Khantadu Tirpude; Paulzagade Adku Sonu	Indian National Congress
1962	Adkuji Sonuji Paulsagade	Indian National Congress
1967	S. P. Kapgate	Bharatiya Jana Sangh
1972	Martand Ramaji Kapgate	Indian National Congress
1978	Madukar Tulshiramji Bedarkar	Indian National Congress (I)
1980	Jayant Krushnamurari Katakwar	Indian National Congress (I)
1985	Jayant Krushnamurari Katakwar	Indian National Congress
1990	Dr. Hemkrishna Shamraoji Kapgate	Bharatiya Janata Party
1995	Dr. Hemkrishna Shamraoji Kapgate	Bharatiya Janata Party
1999	Sewakbhau Nirdhanji Waghaye	Indian National Congress
2004	Sewakbhau Nirdhanji Waghaye	Indian National Congress
2009	Nana Falgunrao Patole	Bharatiya Janata Party
2014	Rajesh Kashiwar	Bharatiya Janata Party
2019	Nana Falgunrao Patole	Indian National Congress
2024	Nana Falgunrao Patole	Indian National Congress

== Election results ==
=== Assembly Election 2024 ===
2024 Maharashtra Legislative Assembly election : Sakoli
Party	Candidate	Votes	%	±%
INC	Nana Falgunrao Patole	96,795	41.32	▼0.59
BJP	Avinash Anandrao Brahmankar	96,587	41.23	▲2.06
Independent	Dr. Somadatta Karanjekar	18,309	7.82	New
VBA	Dr. Avinash Raghunath Nanhe	11,188	4.78	▼10.38
BSP	Roshan Baburao Fule	6,037	2.58	▲0.97
Independent	Ashok Sadashiv Patle	3,634	1.55	New
NOTA	None of the above	1,340	0.57	▼0.11
Margin of victory		208	0.09	▼2.66
Turnout		235,600	71.63	▼0.11
Total valid votes		234,260		
Registered electors		328,909		▲3.17
INC hold		Swing	▼0.59	

=== Assembly Election 2019 ===
2019 Maharashtra Legislative Assembly election : Sakoli
Party	Candidate	Votes	%	±%
INC	Nana Falgunrao Patole	95,208	41.91	▲16.52
BJP	Dr. Parinay Ramesh Fuke	88,968	39.17	▲2.10
VBA	Sevakbhau Nirdhan Waghaye	34,436	15.16	New
BSP	Dr. Prakash Malgave	3,650	1.61	▼12.89
NOTA	None of the above	1,543	0.68	▲0.34
Margin of victory		6,240	2.75	▼8.93
Turnout		228,722	71.74	▼2.47
Total valid votes		227,157		
Registered electors		318,804		▲7.64
INC gain from BJP		Swing	▲4.84	

=== Assembly Election 2014 ===
2014 Maharashtra Legislative Assembly election : Sakoli
Party	Candidate	Votes	%	±%
BJP	Rajesh Kashiwar	80,902	37.07	▼23.37
INC	Sewakbhau Nirdhanji Waghaye	55,413	25.39	▼3.92
BSP	Dr. Mahendra Vishwanath Ganvir	31,649	14.50	▲9.21
NCP	Funde Sunil Baburao	19,888	9.11	New
Independent	Ajay Devram Tumsare	11,864	5.44	New
Independent	Sayam Bisan Sitarm	2,784	1.28	New
Independent	Bhusari Tulshiram Raghoji	2,316	1.06	New
SS	Dr. Prashant Yadorao Padole	2,151	0.99	New
NOTA	None of the above	739	0.34	New
Margin of victory		25,489	11.68	▼19.45
Turnout		219,789	74.21	▲0.66
Total valid votes		218,231		
Registered electors		296,188		▲7.77
BJP hold		Swing	▼23.37	

=== Assembly Election 2009 ===
2009 Maharashtra Legislative Assembly election : Sakoli
Party	Candidate	Votes	%	±%
BJP	Nana Falgunrao Patole	122,168	60.44	▲28.21
INC	Waghaye Sevakbhau Nirdhan	59,253	29.31	▼13.46
BSP	Kewat Sanjay Gajanan	10,688	5.29	▼10.40
CPI	Tembhurne Chandrashekhar Shamrao	2,993	1.48	New
Margin of victory		62,915	31.13	▲20.59
Turnout		202,138	73.55	▼3.27
Total valid votes		202,133		
Registered electors		274,830		▲57.47
BJP gain from INC		Swing	▲17.67	

=== Assembly Election 2004 ===
2004 Maharashtra Legislative Assembly election : Sakoli
Party	Candidate	Votes	%	±%
INC	Sewakbhau Nirdhanji Waghaye	57,293	42.77	▼0.42
BJP	Girhepunje Shiwram Sonabaji	43,173	32.23	▼4.41
BSP	Homaraj Martand Kapgate	21,019	15.69	▲14.98
Independent	Shesharao Pisaramji Girhepunje	8,306	6.20	New
Peoples Republican Party	Lalchand Shrawan Khadke	1,687	1.26	New
Independent	Bhiogade Purushottam Sakharam	973	0.73	New
LJP	Prakash Jagannath Janbandhu	934	0.70	New
Margin of victory		14,120	10.54	▲4.00
Turnout		134,066	76.82	▼1.32
Total valid votes		133,953		
Registered electors		174,528		▲13.95
INC hold		Swing	▼0.42	

=== Assembly Election 1999 ===
1999 Maharashtra Legislative Assembly election : Sakoli
Party	Candidate	Votes	%	±%
INC	Sewakbhau Nirdhanji Waghaye	48,654	43.19	▲13.30
BJP	Girhepunje Shiwram Sonabaji	41,281	36.64	▼0.92
NCP	Padole Yadorao Shriram	14,568	12.93	New
BBM	Sadashiv Barku Walthare	7,007	6.22	New
BSP	Duryodhan Mohan Meshram	802	0.71	New
Margin of victory		7,373	6.54	▼1.13
Turnout		119,675	78.14	▼7.68
Total valid votes		112,663		
Registered electors		153,162		▼1.45
INC gain from BJP		Swing	▲5.63	

=== Assembly Election 1995 ===
1995 Maharashtra Legislative Assembly election : Sakoli
Party	Candidate	Votes	%	±%
BJP	Dr. Hemkrishna Shamraoji Kapgate	49,059	37.56	▲0.78
INC	Sewakbhau Nirdhanji Waghaye	39,044	29.89	▲14.45
BBM	Dr. Karanjekar Bramhanand Bajiraoji	20,675	15.83	New
Independent	Walthare Sadashio Barku	11,107	8.50	New
Independent	Tekam Ganesh Pandurang	3,169	2.43	New
RPI	Badole Janardhan Kisan	2,282	1.75	New
Independent	Architect Premdas Ramteke	1,148	0.88	New
RPI(K)	Chodichor Chandrakumar Manohar	1,129	0.86	New
Margin of victory		10,015	7.67	▼11.69
Turnout		133,368	85.82	▲11.54
Total valid votes		130,609		
Registered electors		155,413		▲6.68
BJP hold		Swing	▲0.78	

=== Assembly Election 1990 ===
1990 Maharashtra Legislative Assembly election : Sakoli
Party	Candidate	Votes	%	±%
BJP	Dr. Hemkrishna Shamraoji Kapgate	39,372	36.78	▲18.82
Independent	Badole Janardhan Kisan	18,646	17.42	New
INC	Katakwar Jayant Krushnamurari	16,533	15.44	▼20.69
Independent	Udaram Rushi Rakhade	11,540	10.78	New
Independent	Khandate Soma Shivram	6,576	6.14	New
SS	Kanchan Vasantrao Kotwal	4,947	4.62	New
Independent	Irle Wasudeoji Laxman	2,273	2.12	New
JD	Isapure Chandrabhan Shivaji	1,325	1.24	New
Margin of victory		20,726	19.36	▲10.39
Turnout		108,210	74.28	▲5.33
Total valid votes		107,051		
Registered electors		145,680		▲20.36
BJP gain from INC		Swing	▲0.65	

=== Assembly Election 1985 ===
1985 Maharashtra Legislative Assembly election : Sakoli
Party	Candidate	Votes	%	±%
INC	Katakwar Jayant Krushanmurari	29,743	36.13	New
Independent	Nimbekar Govindrao Shivaji	22,362	27.17	New
BJP	Khedikar Manoharrao Narayanrao	14,787	17.96	▼17.49
RPI	Chodichor Manohar Raghoji	14,242	17.30	New
Independent	Vijay Rajendraprasad Sharma	573	0.70	New
Independent	Lonarkar Ramchandra Tukaram	515	0.63	New
Margin of victory		7,381	8.97	▲3.74
Turnout		83,447	68.95	▲3.07
Total valid votes		82,318		
Registered electors		121,033		▲3.34
INC gain from INC(I)		Swing	▼4.55	

=== Assembly Election 1980 ===
1980 Maharashtra Legislative Assembly election : Sakoli
Party	Candidate	Votes	%	±%
INC(I)	Katakwar Jayant Krushnamurari	30,953	40.68	▼4.72
BJP	Nimbekar Govindrao Shivaji	26,976	35.45	New
Independent	Waghaye Kashinath Zibal	11,176	14.69	New
RPI(K)	Ramteke Kewalram Donu	6,657	8.75	New
Margin of victory		3,977	5.23	▲0.89
Turnout		77,157	65.88	▼15.61
Total valid votes		76,087		
Registered electors		117,122		▲5.91
INC(I) hold		Swing	▼4.72	

=== Assembly Election 1978 ===
1978 Maharashtra Legislative Assembly election : Sakoli
Party	Candidate	Votes	%	±%
INC(I)	Bedarkar Madukar Tulshiramji	39,908	45.40	New
JP	Kapgate Shamrao Pagaji	36,093	41.06	New
INC	Kapagate Martandrao Ramji	7,489	8.52	▼41.61
Independent	Garpade Barasram Natthu	1,690	1.92	New
Independent	Shendre Shautram Rajaram	979	1.11	New
Independent	Nandgavali Adeenath Chaitram	730	0.83	New
Margin of victory		3,815	4.34	▼14.76
Turnout		90,126	81.49	▲3.78
Total valid votes		87,905		
Registered electors		110,591		▲22.25
INC(I) gain from INC		Swing	▼4.73	

=== Assembly Election 1972 ===
1972 Maharashtra Legislative Assembly election : Sakoli
Party	Candidate	Votes	%	±%
INC	Martand Ramaji Kapgate	34,326	50.13	▲18.87
ABJS	Shyamrao Pagaji Kapgate	21,245	31.03	▼7.46
RPI(K)	Rajaram Bhiwaji Damle	11,350	16.58	New
RPI	Meshram Sukhdas Maniram	1,550	2.26	▼22.44
Margin of victory		13,081	19.10	▲11.88
Turnout		70,297	77.71	▲5.84
Total valid votes		68,471		
Registered electors		90,463		▲11.97
INC gain from ABJS		Swing	▲11.64	

=== Assembly Election 1967 ===
1967 Maharashtra Legislative Assembly election : Sakoli
Party	Candidate	Votes	%	±%
ABJS	S. P. Kapgate	20,904	38.49	New
INC	A. G. Samrti	16,980	31.26	▼3.61
RPI	S. Moramtek	13,414	24.70	New
Independent	B. J. Uikey	3,015	5.55	New
Margin of victory		3,924	7.22	▼0.70
Turnout		58,065	71.87	▲0.25
Total valid votes		54,313		
Registered electors		80,791		▼1.36
ABJS gain from INC		Swing	▲3.62	

=== Assembly Election 1962 ===
1962 Maharashtra Legislative Assembly election : Sakoli
Party	Candidate	Votes	%	±%
INC	Adkuji Sonuji Paulsagade	18,535	34.87	▼11.97
ABJS	Shyamrao Pagaji Kapgate	14,324	26.95	New
RPI	Bhanudas Sego Bansod	13,748	25.86	New
Independent	Bajirao Jairam Uike	3,638	6.84	New
Independent	Patiram Tulsiram Kamane	1,094	2.06	New
Independent	Raibhan Laxman Dahiwale	984	1.85	New
Independent	Kewalram Sonaji Funde	542	1.02	New
Margin of victory		4,211	7.92	▲1.64
Turnout		58,659	71.62	▼33.76
Total valid votes		53,159		
Registered electors		81,904		▼43.84
INC hold		Swing	▲11.00	

=== Assembly Election 1957 ===
1957 Bombay State Legislative Assembly election : Sakoli
Party	Candidate	Votes	%	±%
INC	Tirpude Nashikro Khantadu	36,687	23.87	▼22.83
INC	Paulzagade Adku Sonu	35,303	22.97	▼23.73
SCF	Sakhare Daji Atmaram	27,030	17.59	▲5.18
ABJS	Kapgate Sahmrao Paga	26,405	17.18	New
PSP	Kanhekar Shrawan Mangiru	12,158	7.91	New
PSP	Fate Shri Ram Raoji	11,080	7.21	New
Independent	Arjunkar Budhram Sego	5,032	3.27	New
Margin of victory		9,657	6.28	▲3.56
Turnout		153,695	105.38	▼1.16
Total valid votes		153,695		
Registered electors		145,846		▲41.30
INC hold		Swing	▼0.84	

=== Assembly Election 1952 ===
1952 Hyderabad State Legislative Assembly election : Sakoli
Party	Candidate	Votes	%	±%
INC	Nashik Khantadu Tirpude	27,171	24.71	New
INC	Arjun Ganaji Sanrit	24,183	21.99	New
Socialist	Shnakarrao Dillisao Nashine	14,288	12.99	New
SCF	Daji Atmaram Sakhare	13,651	12.41	New
Independent	Shamrao Paga Kapgate	12,187	11.08	New
Independent	Ganpat Raghu Kapgate	6,565	5.97	New
KMPP	Umraosingh Mannalalsingh Javheri	5,417	4.93	New
Independent	Kishan Badha Jambhulkar	4,456	4.05	New
Independent	Vithal Sakharam Halmare	2,050	1.86	New
Margin of victory		2,988	2.72	
Turnout		109,968	106.54	
Total valid votes		109,968		
Registered electors		103,216		
INC win (new seat)				

== See also ==
- Sakoli
- List of constituencies of Maharashtra Vidhan Sabha
