= 2024 Indian general election in Maharashtra =

Election to elect members of the 18th Lok Sabha in Maharashtra

- 19 April 2024 to 20 May 2024

All 48 Maharashtra seats in the Lok Sabha
- Opinion polls
- Turnout: 61.29% (▲0.27 pp)
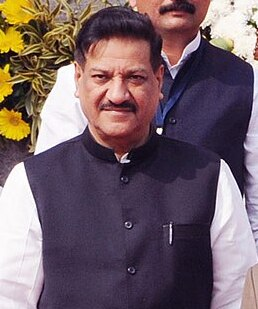

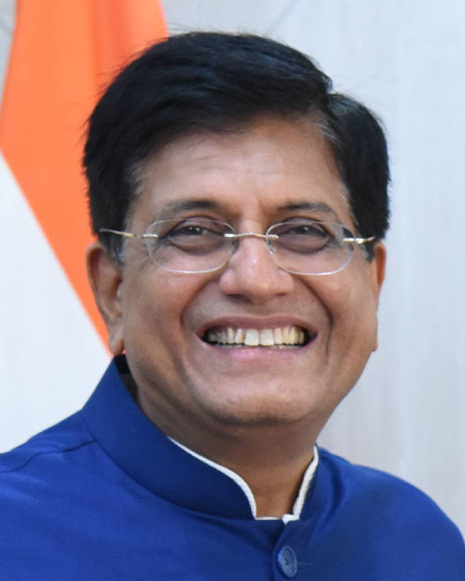

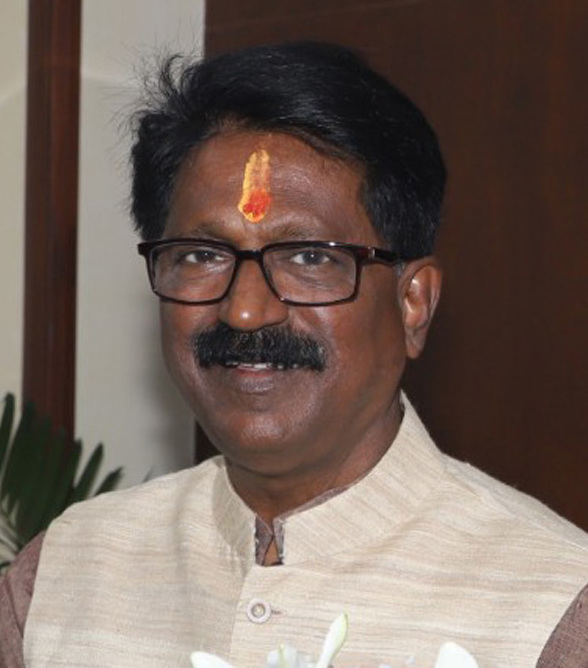

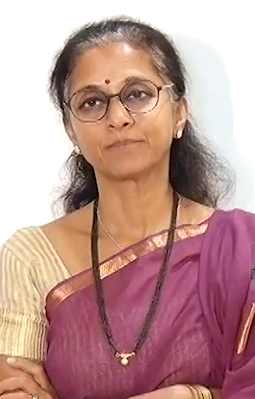

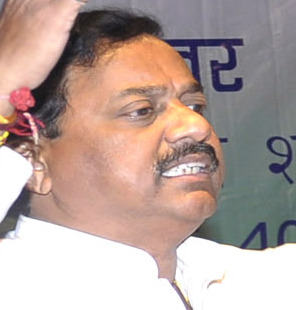
	First party	Second party	Third party
Leader	Prithviraj Chavan	Piyush Goyal	Arvind Sawant
Party	INC	BJP	SS(UBT)
Alliance	INDIA	NDA	INDIA
Leader since	2024	2010	2022
Leader's seat	Did not contest	Mumbai North	Mumbai South
Last election	16.41%, 1 seat	27.84%, 23 seats	New Party
Seats won	13	9	9
Seat change	▲12	▼14	▲4 (Note: Seat change from the MPs who supported Uddhav Thackeray in the 2022 Maharashtra political crisis.)
Popular vote	9,641,856	14,913,914	9,522,797
Percentage	16.92%	26.18%	16.72%
Swing	▲0.51 pp	▼1.66 pp	New
	Fourth party	Fifth party	Sixth party
		SHS
Leader	Supriya Sule	Eknath Shinde	Sunil Tatkare
Party	NCP-SP	SHS	NCP
Alliance	INDIA	NDA	NDA
Leader since	2023	2022	2023
Leader's seat	Baramati	Did Not Contest	Raigad
Last election	New Party	New Party	Party Split
Seats won	8	7	1
Seat change	▲5 (Note: Seat change from the MPs who supported Sharad Pawar in the 2023 Maharashtra political crisis.)	▼6 (Note: Seat change from the MPs who supported Eknath Shinde in the 2022 Maharashtra political crisis.)	(Note: Seat change from the MPs who supported Ajit Pawar in the 2023 Maharashtra political crisis.)
Popular vote	5,851,166	7,377,674	2,053,757
Percentage	10.27%	12.95%	3.6%
Swing	New	New	New
Prime Minister before election
Narendra Modi
BJP
Prime Minister after election
Narendra Modi
BJP

The 2024 Indian general election in Maharashtra was held in five phases between 19 April and 20 May 2024 to elect 48 members of the 18th Lok Sabha. The result of the election was announced on 4 June 2024.

== Election schedule ==
On 16th March 2024, the Election Commission of India announced the schedule for the 2024 Indian general election, with Maharashtra scheduled to vote during the first five phases on 19, 26 April, 7, 13, and 20 May.

Phase wise schedule of 2024 Indian general election in Maharashtra Phase I Phase II Phase III Phase IV Phase V

Poll event	Phase				
Poll event	I	II	III	IV	V
Notification date	20 March	28 March	12 April	18 April	26 April
Last date for filing nomination	27 March	4 April	19 April	25 April	3 May
Scrutiny of nomination	28 March	5 April	20 April	26 April	4 May
Last Date for withdrawal of nomination	30 March	8 April	22 April	29 April	6 May
Date of poll	19 April	26 April	7 May	13 May	20 May
Date of counting of votes/Result	4 June 2024				
No. of constituencies	5	8	11	11	13

== Parties and alliances ==
=== National Democratic Alliance ===
National Democratic Alliance

Party	Flag	Symbol	Leader	Seats contested
Bharatiya Janata Party			Piyush Goyal	28
Shiv Sena			Shrikant Shinde	15
Nationalist Congress Party			Sunil Tatkare	4
Rashtriya Samaj Paksha			Mahadev Jankar	1
Total				48

=== Indian National Developmental Inclusive Alliance ===
Indian National Developmental Inclusive Alliance

Party	Flag	Symbol	Leader	Seats contested
Shiv Sena (Uddhav Balasaheb Thackeray)			Arvind Sawant	21
Indian National Congress			Prithviraj Chavan	17
Nationalist Congress Party – Sharadchandra Pawar			Supriya Sule	10
Total				48

=== Others ===
Party	Flag	Symbol	Leader	Seats contested
Bahujan Samaj Party				48
Vanchit Bahujan Aaghadi			Prakash Ambedkar	38
All India Majlis-e-Ittehadul Muslimeen			Imtiyaz Jaleel	5
Swabhimani Paksha			Raju Shetti	1
Communist Party of India				1

=== Party/Alliance Wise Seat Matrix ===
Alliance & Party
Alliance & Party					Total (INDIA)
Alliance & Party		INDIA			Total (INDIA)
Alliance & Party		SS(UBT)	INC	NCP(SP)	Total (INDIA)
NDA					
NDA	BJP	5	15	8	28
NDA	SHS	13	2	—N/a	15
NDA	NCP	2	—N/a	2	4
NDA	RSP	1	—N/a	—N/a	1
Total (NDA)		21	17	10	48

== Candidates ==
Constituency		NDA		INDIA	
#	Name	Party	Candidate	Party	Candidate
1	Nandurbar (ST)	BJP	Heena Gavit	INC	Gowaal Kagada Padavi
2	Dhule	BJP	Subhash Bhamre	INC	Bachhav Shobha Dinesh
3	Jalgaon	BJP	Smita Wagh	SS(UBT)	Karan Pawar
4	Raver	BJP	Raksha Khadse	NCP-SP	Shriram Patil
5	Buldhana	SHS	P. G. Jadhav	SS(UBT)	Narendra Khedekar
6	Akola	BJP	Anup Dhotre	INC	Abhay Kashinath Patil
7	Amravati (SC)	BJP	Navneet Kaur Rana	INC	B. B. Wankhede
8	Wardha	BJP	Ramdas Tadas	NCP-SP	Amar Sharadrao Kale
9	Ramtek (SC)	SHS	Raju Devnath Parwe	INC	Shyamkumar Barve
10	Nagpur	BJP	Nitin Gadkari	INC	Vikas Thakare
11	Bhandara–Gondiya	BJP	Sunil Mendhe	INC	Dr. P. Y. Padole
12	Gadchiroli–Chimur (ST)	BJP	Ashok Nete	INC	Dr. Namdeo Kirsan
13	Chandrapur	BJP	Sudhir Mungantiwar	INC	Pratibha Suresh Dhanorkar
14	Yavatmal–Washim	SHS	Rajashri Hemant Patil	SS(UBT)	Sanjay Deshmukh
15	Hingoli	SHS	Baburao Kadam Kohalikar	SS(UBT)	N. B. Patil Ashtikar
16	Nanded	BJP	P. C. Chikhalikar	INC	V. B. Chavan
17	Parbhani	RSPS	Mahadev Jankar	SS(UBT)	Sanjay Haribhau Jadhav
18	Jalna	BJP	Raosaheb Danve	INC	Dr. Kalyan Kale
19	Aurangabad	SHS	Sandipanrao Bhumre	SS(UBT)	Chandrakant Khaire
20	Dindori (ST)	BJP	Bharati Pawar	NCP-SP	Bhaskar Bhagare
21	Nashik	SHS	Hemant Godse	SS(UBT)	Rajabhau Waje
22	Palghar (ST)	BJP	Hemant Savara	SS(UBT)	Bharti Kamdi
23	Bhiwandi	BJP	Kapil Patil	NCP-SP	Suresh Mhatre
24	Kalyan	SHS	Shrikant Shinde	SS(UBT)	Vaishali Darekar Rane
25	Thane	SHS	Naresh Mhaske	SS(UBT)	Rajan Vichare
26	Mumbai North	BJP	Piyush Goyal	INC	Bhushan Patil
27	Mumbai North West	SHS	Ravindra Waikar	SS(UBT)	Amol Kirtikar
28	Mumbai North East	BJP	Mihir Kotecha	SS(UBT)	Sanjay Dina Patil
29	Mumbai North Central	BJP	Ujjwal Nikam	INC	Varsha Gaikwad
30	Mumbai South Central	SHS	Rahul Shewale	SS(UBT)	Anil Desai
31	Mumbai South	SHS	Yamini Jadhav	SS(UBT)	Arvind Sawant
32	Raigad	NCP	Sunil Tatkare	SS(UBT)	Anant Geete
33	Maval	SHS	Shrirang Barne	SS(UBT)	Sanjog Waghere Patil
34	Pune	BJP	Murlidhar Mohol	INC	Ravindra Hemraj Dhangekar
35	Baramati	NCP	Sunetra Pawar	NCP-SP	Supriya Sule
36	Shirur	NCP	Shivajirao Adhalarao Patil	NCP-SP	Amol Kolhe
37	Ahmednagar	BJP	Sujay Vikhe Patil	NCP-SP	Nilesh Dnyandev Lanke
38	Shirdi (SC)	SHS	Sadashiv Lokhande	SS(UBT)	B. R. Wakchaure
39	Beed	BJP	Pankaja Munde	NCP-SP	Bajrang Manohar Sonwane
40	Dharashiv	NCP	Archana Ranajagjitsinha	SS(UBT)	Omprakash Rajenimbalkar
41	Latur (SC)	BJP	S. T. Shrangare	INC	Dr. Shivaji Kalge
42	Solapur (SC)	BJP	Ram Satpute	INC	Praniti Sushilkumar Shinde
43	Madha	BJP	Ranjit Naik-Nimbalkar	NCP-SP	Dhairyasheel Patil
44	Sangli	BJP	Sanjaykaka Patil	SS(UBT)	Chandrahar Patil
45	Satara	BJP	Udayanraje Bhosale	NCP-SP	Shashikant Shinde
46	Ratnagiri–Sindhudurg	BJP	Narayan Rane	SS(UBT)	Vinayak Raut
47	Kolhapur	SHS	Sanjay Mandlik	INC	Shahu Chhatrapati Maharaj
48	Hatkanangle	SHS	D. S. Mane	SS(UBT)	Satyajeet Patil

== Surveys and polls ==
=== Opinion polls ===
Polling agency	Date published	Margin of error				Lead
Polling agency	Date published	Margin of error	INDIA	NDA	Others	Lead
ABP News-CVoter	April 2024	±3-5%	18	30	0	NDA
ABP News-CVoter	March 2024	±5%	20	28	0	NDA
India TV-CNX	March 2024	±3%	13	35	0	NDA
India Today-CVoter	February 2024	±3-5%	26	22	0	INDIA
ABP News-CVoter	December 2023	±3-5%	26-28	19-21	0-2	INDIA
Times Now-ETG	December 2023	±3%	16-20	27-31	1-2	NDA
India TV-CNX	October 2023	±3%	20	28	0	NDA
Times Now-ETG	September 2023	±3%	16-20	26-30	1-2	NDA
Times Now-ETG	August 2023	±3%	15-19	28-32	1-2	NDA
India Today-CVoter	August 2023	±3-5%	28	20	0	INDIA

Polling agency	Date published	Margin of error				Lead
Polling agency	Date published	Margin of error	INDIA	NDA	Others	Lead
ABP News-CVoter	April 2024	±3-5%	30	18	0	NDA
ABP News-CVoter	March 2024	±5%	42.1%	42.7%	15.2%	0.6
India Today-CVoter	February 2024	±3-5%	45%	40%	15%	5
India Today-CVoter	August 2023	±3-5%	45%	40%	15%	5

=== Exit polls ===
Polling agency				Lead
Polling agency	NDA	INDIA	Others	Lead
TV9 Bharatvarsh- People's Insight - Polstrat	22	25	1	INDIA
Actual results	17	30	1	INDIA

== Voter turnout ==
=== Phase wise ===
Phase	Poll date	Constituencies	Voter turnout (%)
I	19 April 2024	Ramtek, Nagpur, Bhandara–Gondiya, Gadchiroli–Chimur, Chandrapur	63.71%
II	26 April 2024	Buldhana, Akola, Amravati, Wardha, Yavatmal–Washim, Hingoli, Nanded, Parbhani	62.71%
III	7 May 2024	Raigad, Baramati,Dharashiv, Latur, Solapur, Madha, Sangli, Satara, Ratnagiri–Sindhudurg, Kolhapur, Hatkanangle	63.55%
IV	13 May 2024	Nandurbar, Jalgaon, Raver, Jalna, Aurangabad, Maval, Pune, Shirur, Ahmednagar, Shirdi, Beed	62.21%
V	20 May 2024	Dhule, Dindori, Nashik, Palghar, Bhiwandi, Kalyan, Thane, Mumbai North, Mumbai North West, Mumbai North East, Mumbai North Central, Mumbai South Central, Mumbai South	56.89%
Total			61.29%

=== Constituency wise ===
Constituency		Poll date	Turnout	Swing
1	Nandurbar (ST)	13 May 2024	70.68%	2.03%▲
2	Dhule	20 May 2024	60.21%	3.16%▲
3	Jalgaon	13 May 2024	58.47%	1.92%▲
4	Raver	13 May 2024	64.28%	2.51%▲
5	Buldhana	26 April 2024	62.03%	1.57%▼
6	Akola	26 April 2024	61.79%	1.73%▲
7	Amravati (SC)	26 April 2024	63.67%	2.91%▲
8	Wardha	26 April 2024	64.85%	3.32%▲
9	Ramtek (SC)	19 April 2024	61.01%	1.29%▼
10	Nagpur	19 April 2024	54.32%	0.62%▼
11	Bhandara–Gondiya	19 April 2024	67.04%	1.77%▼
12	Gadchiroli–Chimur (ST)	19 April 2024	71.88%	0.45%▼
13	Chandrapur	19 April 2024	67.55%	2.66%▲
14	Yavatmal–Washim	26 April 2024	62.87%	1.56%▲
15	Hingoli	26 April 2024	63.54%	3.3%▼
16	Nanded	26 April 2024	60.94%	4.75%▼
17	Parbhani	26 April 2024	62.26%	0.86%▼
18	Jalna	13 May 2024	69.18%	4.43%▲
19	Aurangabad	13 May 2024	63.03%	0.52%▼
20	Dindori (ST)	20 May 2024	66.75%	1.04%▲
21	Nashik	20 May 2024	60.75%	1.22%▲
22	Palghar (ST)	20 May 2024	63.91%	0.15%▲
23	Bhiwandi	20 May 2024	59.89%	6.69%▲
24	Kalyan	20 May 2024	50.12%	4.81%▲
25	Thane	20 May 2024	52.09%	2.70%▲
26	Mumbai North	20 May 2024	57.02%	3.07%▼
27	Mumbai North West	20 May 2024	54.84%	0.53%▲
28	Mumbai North East	20 May 2024	56.37%	0.86%▼
29	Mumbai North Central	20 May 2024	51.98%	1.70%▼
30	Mumbai South Central	20 May 2024	53.60%	1.80%▼
31	Mumbai South	20 May 2024	50.06%	1.53%▼
32	Raigad	7 May 2024	60.51%	1.66%▼
33	Maval	13 May 2024	54.87%	4.72%▼
34	Pune	13 May 2024	53.54%	3.65%▲
35	Baramati	7 May 2024	59.50%	2.32%▼
36	Shirur	13 May 2024	54.16%	5.28%▼
37	Ahmednagar	13 May 2024	66.61%	1.82%▲
38	Shirdi (SC)	13 May 2024	63.03%	1.9%▼
39	Beed	13 May 2024	70.92%	4.75%▲
40	Dharashiv	7 May 2024	63.88%	0.12%▲
41	Latur (SC)	7 May 2024	62.59%	0.15%▲
42	Solapur (SC)	7 May 2024	59.19%	0.52%▲
43	Madha	7 May 2024	63.65%	0.12%▼
44	Sangli	7 May 2024	62.27%	3.65%▼
45	Satara	7 May 2024	63.16%	2.69%▲
46	Ratnagiri–Sindhudurg	7 May 2024	62.52%	0.53%▲
47	Kolhapur	7 May 2024	71.59%	0.73%▲
48	Hatkanangle	7 May 2024	71.11%	0.51%▲
			61.29%	0.27%▲

== Results ==
=== Results by party or alliance ===
Alliance/ Party		Popular vote			Seats		
Alliance/ Party		Votes	%	±pp	Contested	Won	+/−
INDIA	INC	9,641,856	16.92	▲0.51	17	13	▲12
INDIA	SS(UBT)	9,522,797	16.52	New	21	9	New
INDIA	NCP(SP)	5,851,166	10.27	New	10	8	New
INDIA	Total	25,015,819	43.71	New	48	30	New
NDA	BJP	14,913,914	26.18	▼1.66	28	9	▼14
NDA	SHS	7,377,674	12.95	New Party	15	7	New Part
NDA	NCP	2,053,757	3.60	Party Split	4	1	Party Split
NDA	RSP	467,282	0.82	▲0.82	1	0	Steady
NDA	Total	24,812,627	43.55	▼7.79 (Note: Compared to the NDA figures in 2019 when it included just the Bharatiya Janata Party and the Shiv Sena.)	48	17	▼24 (Note: Compared to the NDA percentage of votes in 2019 when it included just the Bharatiya Janata Party and the Shiv Sena.)
Others						0	▼01
IND						1	Steady
NOTA		412,815	0.72				
Total		57,179,133	100%	-		48	-

=== Results by Region ===
Region	Total seats	INC		Shiv Sena (UBT)		NCP(SP)		BJP		SHS		NCP		Others
Region	Total seats	Seats Won		Seats Won		Seats Won		Seats Won		Seats Won		Seats Won		Others
Western Maharashtra	11	02	▲02	00	Steady	04	▲01	02	▼03	02	▼01	00	▼03	01
Vidarbha	10	05	▲04	01	▲01	01	▲01	02	▼03	01	▼02	00	Steady	00
Marathwada	09	03	▲03	04	▲02	01	▲01	00	▼04	01	Steady	00	Steady	00
Thane+Konkan	06	00	Steady	00	▼02	01	▲01	02	▲01	02	Steady	01	Steady	00
Mumbai	06	01	▲01	03	▲02	00	Steady	01	▼02	01	▼02	00	Steady	00
North Maharashtra	06	02	▲02	01	▲01	01	▲01	02	▼03	00	▼01	00	Steady	00
Total	48	13	▲12	09	▲04	08	▲05	09	▼14	07	▼06	01	▼03	

=== Strike-rate ===
Strike rate is determined by calculating the number of seats won by a party of the number of seats it contested.

Alliance/ Party		Seats contested	Seats Won	Strike Rate
INDIA	INC	17	13	76.47%
INDIA	SS(UBT)	21	9	42.85%
INDIA	NCP(SP)	10	8	80.0%
INDIA	Total	48	30	62.5%
NDA	BJP	28	9	32.1%
NDA	SHS	15	7	46.6%
NDA	NCP	4	1	25.0%
NDA	RSP	1	0	0.0%
NDA	Total	48	17	35.4%

=== Vote Share ===
==== Party Wise ====
Region	INC	Shiv Sena (UBT)	NCP(SP)	BJP	SHS	NCP
Region	Voteshare	Voteshare	Voteshare	Voteshare	Voteshare	Voteshare
Western Maharashtra	14.1%	8.9%	24.8%	25.2%	9.3%	8.7%
Vidarbha	33.8%	7.7%	4.5%	30.0%	7.1%	Not Contested
Marathwada	15.5%	23.2%	6.0%	13.4%	11.9%	3.7%
Thane+Konkan	Not Contested	30.9%	7.2%	21.4%	19.1%	7.3%
Mumbai	14.24	31.4%	Not Contested	28.3%	21.0%	Not Contested
North Maharashtra	18.06%	14.1%	12.7%	39.8%	6.1%	Not Contested
Total	16.92%	16.72%	10.27%	26.18%	12.95%	3.60%

Region	INC	Shiv Sena (UBT)	NCP(SP)	BJP	SHS	NCP
Region	Voteshare	Voteshare	Voteshare	Voteshare	Voteshare	Voteshare
Western Maharashtra	17,91,437	11,63,841	32,16,377	32,95,853	18,12,580	11,31,720
Vidarbha	39,96,739	915,195	5,33,106	35,54,188	13,86,458	Not Contested
Marathwada	17,45,812	26,12,980	6,83,950	21,91,928	12,86,434	418,906
Thane+Konkan	Not Contested	21,41,874	4,99,464	14,83,101	13,23,867	508,352
Mumbai	768,083	16,94,326	Not Contested	15,30,253	11,37,380	Not Contested
North Maharashtra	13,29,864	10,39,563	936,035	29,36,360	4,54,728	Not Contested
Total	9,641,856	9,522,797	5,851,166	1,49,91,683	74,01,447	20,58,978

==== Alliance Wise ====
Region	INDIA	NDA	INDIA	NDA
Region	Voteshare	Voteshare	Seatshare	Seatshare
Western Maharashtra	47.8%	43.2%	6	4
Vidarbha	46.00%	37.10%	7	3
Marathwada	44.7%	29.00%	8	1
Thane+Konkan	38.1%	47.8%	1	5
Mumbai	45.64%	49.3%	4	2
North Maharashtra	44.86%	45.9%	4	2
Total	43.71%	43.55%	30	17

Party	Seats Retained	Seats Lost	Seats Gained
INC	01	Steady	▲12
SS(UBT)	03	▼02	▲06
BJP	06	▼17	▲03
NCP(SP)	03	Steady	▲05
SHS	04	▼09	▲03
NCP	01	Steady	Steady

=== Results by constituency ===
Constituency			Winner				Runner Up				Margin	%
#	Name	Poll %	Candidate	Party	Votes	%	Candidate	Party	Votes	%	Margin	%
1	Nandurbar	70.70%	Gowaal K. Padavi	INC	7,45,998	53.48	Heena Gavit	BJP	5,86,878	42.07	1,59,120	11.41
2	Dhule	60.20%	Bachhav Dinesh	INC	5,83,866	47.78	Subhash Bhamre	BJP	5,80,035	47.47	3,831	0.31
3	Jalgaon	58.47%	Smita Wagh	BJP	6,74,428	57.61	Karan Pawar	SS(UBT)	4,22,834	36.12	2,51,594	21.49
4	Raver	64.24%	Raksha Khadse	BJP	6,30,879	53.75	Shriram Patil	NCP-SP	3,58,696	30.56	2,72,183	23.19
5	Buldhana	62.08%	P. G. Jadhav	SS	3,49,867	31.51	Narendra Khedekar	SS(UBT)	3,20,388	28.86	29,479	2.65
6	Akola	61.91%	Anup Dhotre	BJP	4,57,030	38.94	Abhay Kashinath Patil	INC	4,16,404	35.48	40,626	3.46
7	Amravati	63.82%	B. B. Wankhade	INC	5,26,271	44.80	Navneet Kaur Rana	BJP	5,06,540	43.12	19,731	1.68
8	Wardha	65.01%	Amar Kale	NCP-SP	5,33,106	48.61	Ramdas Tadas	BJP	4,51,458	41.17	81,648	7.44
9	Ramtek	61.07%	Shyamkumar Barve	INC	6,13,025	48.93	Raju Parwe	SS	5,36,257	42.80	76,768	6.13
10	Nagpur	54.46%	Nitin Gadkari	BJP	6,55,027	54.04	Vikas Thakre	INC	5,17,424	42.69	1,37,603	11.35
11	Bhandara Gondiya	67.48%	P. Y. Padole	INC	5,87,413	47.46	Sunil Mendhe	BJP	5,50,033	44.44	37,380	3.02
12	Gadchiroli - Chimur	72.06%	Namdeo Kirsan	INC	6,17,792	52.90	Ashok Nete	BJP	4,76,096	40.76	1,41,696	12.14
13	Chandrapur	67.47%	Pratibha Dhanorkar	INC	7,18,410	57.70	Sudhir Mungantiwar	BJP	4,58,004	36.78	2,60,406	20.92
14	Yavatmal- Washim	63.09%	Sanjay Deshmukh	SS(UBT)	5,94,807	48.53	Hemant Patil	SS	5,00,334	40.82	94,473	7.71
15	Hingoli	63.73%	N. B. Patil Ashtikar	SS(UBT)	4,92,535	42.47	Baburao Kadam	SS	3,83,933	33.10	1,08,602	9.37
16	Nanded	60.87%	V. B. Chavan	INC	5,28,894	46.64	P. P. Chikhalikar	BJP	4,69,452	41.40	59,442	5.24
17	Parbhani	62.66%	Sanjay Jadhav	SS(UBT)	6,01,343	45.17	Mahadev Jankar	RSPS	4,67,282	35.10	1,34,061	10.07
18	Jalna	69.21%	Kalyan Kale	INC	6,07,897	44.45	Raosaheb Danve	BJP	4,97,939	36.41	1,09,958	8.04
19	Aurangabad	63.18%	Sandipanrao Bhumre	SS	4,76,130	36.55	Imtiyaz Jaleel	AIMIM	3,41,480	26.21	1,34,650	10.34
20	Dindori	66.79%	Bhaskar Bhagare	NCP-SP	5,77,339	46.49	Bharati Pawar	BJP	4,64,140	37.37	1,13,199	9.12
21	Nashik	60.85%	Rajabhau Waje	SS(UBT)	6,16,729	49.83	Hemant Godse	SS	4,54,728	36.74	1,62,001	13.09
22	Palghar	64.04%	Hemant Savara	BJP	6,01,244	43.67	Bharti Kamdi	SS(UBT)	4,17,938	30.36	1,83,306	13.31
23	Bhiwandi	60.04%	Suresh Mhatre	NCP-SP	4,99,464	39.80	Kapil Patil	BJP	4,33,343	34.54	66,121	5.26
24	Kalyan	50.21%	Shrikant Shinde	SS	5,89,636	56.30	Vaishali Darekar Rane	SS(UBT)	3,80,492	36.33	2,09,144	19.97
25	Thane	52.19%	Naresh Mhaske	SS	7,34,231	56.00	Rajan Vichare	SS(UBT)	5,17,220	39.45	2,17,011	16.55
26	Mumbai North	57.14%	Piyush Goyal	BJP	6,80,146	65.62	Bhushan Patil	INC	3,22,538	31.12	3,57,608	34.50
27	Mumbai North West	55.03%	Ravindra Waikar	SS	4,52,644	47.39	Amol G. Kirtikar	SS(UBT)	4,52,596	47.39	48	0.00
28	Mumbai North East	56.59%	Sanjay Dina Patil	SS(UBT)	4,50,937	48.63	Mihir Kotecha	BJP	4,21,076	45.41	29,861	3.22
29	Mumbai North Central	52.20%	Varsha Gaikwad	INC	4,45,545	48.92	Ujjwal Nikam	BJP	4,29,031	47.11	16,514	1.81
30	Mumbai South Central	53.88%	Anil Desai	SS(UBT)	3,95,138	49.71	Rahul Shewale	SS	3,41,754	42.99	53,384	6.72
31	Mumbai South	50.32%	Arvind Sawant	SS(UBT)	3,95,655	51.16	Yamini Jadhav	SS	3,42,982	44.35	52,673	6.81
32	Raigad	60.69%	Sunil Tatkare	NCP	5,08,352	50.07	Anant Geete	SS(UBT)	4,25,568	41.92	82,784	8.15
33	Maval	54.89%	Shrirang Barne	SS	6,92,832	48.78	Sanjog Waghere Patil	SS(UBT)	5,96,217	41.98	96,615	6.80
34	Pune	53.56%	Murlidhar Mohol	BJP	5,84,728	52.93	Ravindra Dhangekar	INC	4,61,690	41.79	1,23,038	11.14
35	Baramati	59.47%	Supriya Sule	NCP-SP	7,32,312	51.79	Sunetra Pawar	NCP	5,73,979	40.59	1,58,333	11.20
36	Shirur	54.08%	Amol Kolhe	NCP-SP	6,98,692	50.71	Shivajirao Patil	NCP	5,57,741	40.48	1,40,951	10.23
37	Ahmednagar	66.64%	Nilesh D. Lanke	NCP-SP	6,24,797	47.08	Sujay Vikhe Patil	BJP	5,95,868	44.90	28,929	2.18
38	Shirdi	63.08%	B. R. Wakchaure	SS(UBT)	4,76,900	44.97	Sadashiv Lokhande	SS	4,26,371	40.21	50,529	4.76
39	Beed	70.90%	Bajrang Sonwane	NCP-SP	6,83,950	44.86	Pankaja Munde	BJP	6,77,397	44.43	6,553	0.43
40	Osmanabad	64.17%	Omprakash Nimbalkar	SS(UBT)	7,48,752	58.38	Ranajagjitsinha Patil	NCP	4,18,906	32.66	3,29,846	25.72
41	Latur	62.57%	Shivaji Kalge	INC	6,09,021	48.99	Sudhakar Shrangare	BJP	5,47,140	44.01	61,881	4.98
42	Solapur	59.28%	Praniti Shinde	INC	6,20,225	51.47	Ram Satpute	BJP	5,46,028	45.31	74,197	6.16
43	Madha	63.79%	Dhairyasheel Patil	NCP-SP	6,22,213	48.80	Ranjit Naik-Nimbalkar	BJP	5,01,376	39.32	1,20,837	9.48
44	Sangli	62.36%	Vishal Patil	IND	5,71,666	48.89	Sanjaykaka Patil	BJP	4,71,613	40.33	1,00,053	8.56
45	Satara	63.08%	Udayanraje Bhosale	BJP	5,71,134	47.59	Shashikant Shinde	NCP-SP	5,38,363	44.86	32,771	2.73
46	Ratnagiri- Sindhudurg	62.92%	Narayan Rane	BJP	4,48,514	48.91	Vinayak Raut	SS(UBT)	4,00,656	43.69	47,858	5.22
47	Kolhapur	71.72%	Shahu Maharaj	INC	7,54,522	54.12	Sanjay Mandlik	SS	5,99,558	43.00	1,54,964	11.12
48	Hatkanangale	71.27%	D. S. Mane	SS	5,20,190	40.10	Satyajeet Patil	SS(UBT)	5,06,764	39.06	13,426	1.04

== Assembly segment wise lead of Parties ==
2024 Maharashtra Lok Sabha Elections Assembly Wise Map

Party	Assembly Segments
BJP	83
INC	63
SS(UBT)	56
SHS	38
NCP(SP)	32
NCP	6
Total assembly wise leads out of 288

Alliance/ Party		Assembly segments	Position in the Assembly
INDIA	INC	63	16
INDIA	SS(UBT)	56	20
INDIA	NCP-SP	32	10
INDIA	CPI(M))	Did not contest	1
INDIA	PWPI	Did not contest	1
INDIA	Total	151	50
NDA	BJP	83	132
NDA	SHS	38	57
NDA	NCP	6	41
NDA	RSP	1	1
NDA	RSVA	Did Not Contest	1
NDA	JSS	Did Not Contest	2
NDA	RYSP	Did Not Contest	1
NDA	IND	Did Not Contest	2
NDA	Total	128	237
Others	SP	Did not contest	2
Others	AIMIM	2	1
Others	IND	7	0
Others	Total	9	3
Total		288	

== Post-election developments ==
In June 2026, six Members of Parliament (MPs) from Shiv Sena (UBT) defected to the Shiv Sena led by Eknath Shinde.

Shiv Sena leaders stated that the six MPs had formed a separate group and were expected to merge with the Shinde-led Shiv Sena.

Since the group constituted more than two-thirds of the party's Lok Sabha members, they argued that the move would not attract disqualification under the anti-defection provisions.

As a result of the defections, the Shiv Sena (UBT) saw its Lok Sabha tally fall from 9 to 3, whereas the Shinde-led Shiv Sena increased its numbers from 7 to 13, consolidating its position within Maharashtra's ruling NDA alliance.

List of SS(UBT) MPs who defected and merged with Shinde-led Sena
Name of MP	Constituency	Party	Merged
Sanjay Dina Patil	Mumbai North East	SS(UBT)	SHS
Sanjay Haribhau Jadhav	Parbhani	SS(UBT)	SHS
Sanjay Deshmukh	Yavatmal–Washim	SS(UBT)	SHS
Nagesh Bapurao Patil Ashtikar	Hingoli	SS(UBT)	SHS
Omraje Nimbalkar	Dharashiv	SS(UBT)	SHS
Bhausaheb Rajaram Wakchaure	Shirdi	SS(UBT)	SHS

== See also ==
- 2024 Indian general election in Manipur
- 2024 Indian general election in Meghalaya
- 2024 Indian general election in Mizoram
