= Tumsar Assembly constituency =

Constituency of the Maharashtra legislative assembly in India

Coordinates: 21.38°N 79.74°E

Tumsar - Mohadi
- Constituency No. 60 for the Maharashtra Legislative Assembly

Constituency details
- Country: India
- Region: Western India
- State: Maharashtra
- District: Bhandara
- Lok Sabha constituency: Bhandara–Gondiya
- Established: 1952
- Total electors: 310,471
- Reservation: None

Member of Legislative Assembly
- 15th Maharashtra Legislative Assembly
- Incumbent Raju Manikrao Karemore
- Party: NCP
- Alliance: NDA
- Elected year: 2024
- Preceded by: Charan Waghmare

Tumsar Assembly constituency is one of the 288 Vidhan Sabha (legislative assembly) constituencies in Maharashtra state in central India. This constituency is one of the three constituencies located in Bhandara district.

Tumsar is part of Bhandara-Gondiya Lok Sabha constituency along with five other Vidhan Sabha constituencies, namely Sakoli and Bhandara in Bhandara district and Gondiya, Arjuni Morgaon and Tirora in Gondia district.

== Members of Legislative Assembly ==
Year	Member	Party
1952	Narayan Sambhuji Karemore	Socialist Party
1957	Makade Aoo Malku	Indian National Congress
1962	Ram Lanjewar	Indian National Congress
1967	Keshavrao Pardhi	Indian National Congress
1972	Keshavrao Pardhi	Indian National Congress
1978	Subhashchandra Karemore	Indian National Congress (I)
1980	Subhashchandra Karemore	Indian National Congress (I)
1985	Ishwardayal Patale	Janata Party
1990	Subhashchandra Karemore	Independent
1995	Madhukar Kukde	Bharatiya Janata Party
1999	Madhukar Kukde	Bharatiya Janata Party
2004	Madhukar Kukde	Bharatiya Janata Party
2009	Anil Bawankar	Indian National Congress
2014	Charan Waghmare	Bharatiya Janata Party
2019	Raju Karemore	Nationalist Congress Party
2024	Raju Karemore	Nationalist Congress Party

== Election results ==
=== Assembly Election 2024 ===
2024 Maharashtra Legislative Assembly election : Tumsar
Party	Candidate	Votes	%	±%
Nationalist Congress Party (post–2023)	Raju Manikrao Karemore	135,813	58.88%	New
NCP-SP	Charan Sovinda Waghmare	71,508	31.00%	New
Independent	Thakchand Atmaram Mungusmare	5,485	2.38%	New
BSP	Borkar Yadorao Lalaji	4,097	1.78%	▲0.13
Independent	Avinash Mahadeo Sonwane	3,613	1.57%	New
Independent	Waghamare Shivcharan Premlal	2,340	1.01%	New
Independent	Dhanendra Balvir Turkar	1,930	0.84%	New
NOTA	None of the above	1,048	0.45%	▼0.45
Margin of victory		64,305	27.88%	▲24.27
Turnout		231,708	74.63%	▲3.79
Total valid votes		230,660		
Registered electors		310,471		▲2.25
Nationalist Congress Party (post–2023) gain from NCP		Swing	▲17.96	

=== Assembly Election 2019 ===
2019 Maharashtra Legislative Assembly election : Tumsar
Party	Candidate	Votes	%	±%
NCP	Raju Manikrao Karemore	87,190	40.92%	▲18.38
Independent	Charan Sovinda Waghmare	79,490	37.30%	New
BJP	Pradeep Motiram Padole	33,457	15.70%	▼21.11
BSP	Pro. Dr. Chhaya Murlidhar Gabhane	3,515	1.65%	▼7.00
Independent	Dr. Pankaj Subhashchandra Karemore	3,158	1.48%	New
VBA	Vijay Ramkrushna Shahare	2,234	1.05%	New
Independent	K. K. Panchbudhe	1,935	0.91%	New
NOTA	None of the above	1,910	0.90%	▲0.14
BMP	Lokhande Ravidas Shrawan	1,332	0.63%	New
Margin of victory		7,700	3.61%	▼10.67
Turnout		215,117	70.84%	▼0.86
Total valid votes		213,100		
Registered electors		303,652		▲7.56
NCP gain from BJP		Swing	▲4.11	

=== Assembly Election 2014 ===
2014 Maharashtra Legislative Assembly election : Tumsar
Party	Candidate	Votes	%	±%
BJP	Charan Sovinda Waghmare	73,952	36.81%	▲3.25
NCP	Madhukar Yashwantrao Kukde	45,273	22.54%	New
SS	Patle Rajendra Sahasram	36,005	17.92%	New
INC	Titirmare Pramod Narayan	17,579	8.75%	▼28.51
BSP	Thakre Namdeo Modku	17,375	8.65%	▲3.32
MNS	Shahare Vijay Ramkrushna	2,666	1.33%	New
GGP	Dhurve Subhash Mansaram	2,403	1.20%	New
Independent	Dr. Pratap(sonu) Arjun Gondule	2,121	1.06%	New
NOTA	None of the above	1,519	0.76%	New
Margin of victory		28,679	14.28%	▲10.58
Turnout		202,423	71.70%	▲2.23
Total valid votes		200,892		
Registered electors		282,319		▲9.80
BJP gain from INC		Swing	▼0.45	

=== Assembly Election 2009 ===
2009 Maharashtra Legislative Assembly election : Tumsar
Party	Candidate	Votes	%	±%
INC	Bawankar Anil Fattu	66,557	37.26%	▲18.24
BJP	Madhukar Yashwantrao Kukde	59,940	33.56%	▲8.20
Independent	Charan Sovinda Waghmare	36,825	20.62%	New
BSP	Thakur Sanjay Ramchandra	9,513	5.33%	▼7.96
Prabuddha Republican Party	Borkar Anil Sukhadeo	1,763	0.99%	New
Margin of victory		6,617	3.70%	▲0.12
Turnout		178,617	69.47%	▼6.33
Total valid votes		178,611		
Registered electors		257,121		▲66.04
INC gain from BJP		Swing	▲11.90	

=== Assembly Election 2004 ===
2004 Maharashtra Legislative Assembly election : Tumsar
Party	Candidate	Votes	%	±%
BJP	Madhukar Yashwantrao Kukde	29,725	25.36%	▼7.52
Independent	Anil Bawankar	25,524	21.77%	New
INC	Adv. Shivkumar Parasramji Bhelave	22,300	19.02%	▼7.48
BSP	Karemore Subhashchandra Narayanraoji	15,576	13.29%	▲6.82
Independent	Singanjude Manohar Ganpat	8,740	7.46%	New
Independent	Kotpalliwar Shekar Rajaiyya	6,439	5.49%	New
Independent	Fulekar Sachchidanand Hiraman	3,563	3.04%	New
GGP	Uikey Ashok Shrawan	2,362	2.01%	▼2.29
Margin of victory		4,201	3.58%	▼2.80
Turnout		117,379	75.80%	▲8.42
Total valid votes		117,223		
Registered electors		154,858		▲1.41
BJP hold		Swing	▼7.52	

=== Assembly Election 1999 ===
1999 Maharashtra Legislative Assembly election : Tumsar
Party	Candidate	Votes	%	±%
BJP	Madhukar Yashwantrao Kukde	31,910	32.88%	▼1.61
INC	Titarmare Narayan Tulshiram	25,719	26.50%	▲0.99
Independent	Patle Shishupal Natthu	16,452	16.95%	New
NCP	Karemore Jagdishchandra Narayanraoji	6,352	6.54%	New
BSP	Sachcheedanand Hiraman Fulekar	6,277	6.47%	▲3.51
Independent	Sambhare Madhukarrao Nagorao	4,846	4.99%	New
GGP	Uikey Ashok Shrawan	4,174	4.30%	New
RPI(K)	Ishawardayal Mahipal Patle	977	1.01%	New
Margin of victory		6,191	6.38%	▼2.60
Turnout		102,887	67.38%	▼17.14
Total valid votes		97,062		
Registered electors		152,703		▲9.50
BJP hold		Swing	▼1.61	

=== Assembly Election 1995 ===
1995 Maharashtra Legislative Assembly election : Tumsar
Party	Candidate	Votes	%	±%
BJP	Madhukar Yashwantrao Kukde	39,795	34.49%	New
INC	Ishwardayal Mahipal Patale	29,430	25.51%	▲12.35
Independent	Subhashchandra Narayanraoji Karemore	13,261	11.49%	New
Independent	Sachchidanand Hiraman Fulekar	8,959	7.76%	New
Independent	Shahare Shriram Khalsu	7,714	6.69%	New
BSP	Dudhkuwar Zituji Raghuji	3,421	2.96%	New
Independent	Uchibagale Lalitkumar Tilakchand	2,746	2.38%	New
Independent	Tekam Premlal Sadashio	1,434	1.24%	New
Margin of victory		10,365	8.98%	▼1.19
Turnout		117,869	84.52%	▲14.51
Total valid votes		115,381		
Registered electors		139,459		▲2.46
BJP gain from Independent		Swing	▲3.36	

=== Assembly Election 1990 ===
1990 Maharashtra Legislative Assembly election : Tumsar
Party	Candidate	Votes	%	±%
Independent	Subhashchandra Narayanraoji Karemore	29,246	31.13%	New
JD	Ishwardayal Mahipali Patale	19,693	20.96%	New
INC	Arvind Barikraoji Karemore	12,361	13.16%	▼24.97
SS	Madhukar Yashwantrao Kukde	11,755	12.51%	New
Independent	Lalaji Kothiji Thaokar	7,064	7.52%	New
Independent	Borkar Kundan Shyamsundarji	5,854	6.23%	New
Independent	Raut Lakharam Undru	2,116	2.25%	New
Independent	Mansing Ramsing Madavi	1,839	1.96%	New
Margin of victory		9,553	10.17%	▲3.73
Turnout		95,291	70.01%	▼1.75
Total valid votes		93,963		
Registered electors		136,109		▲20.41
Independent gain from JP		Swing	▼13.44	

=== Assembly Election 1985 ===
1985 Maharashtra Legislative Assembly election : Tumsar
Party	Candidate	Votes	%	±%
JP	Ishwardayalji Mahipal Patle	35,534	44.57%	New
INC	Karemore Subhashchandra Narayanraoji	30,399	38.13%	New
Independent	Fulekar Sachhidanand Hiraman	3,431	4.30%	New
Independent	Nikhade Fulchand Ramlal	2,919	3.66%	New
Independent	Ramteke Sadanand Mangalrao	2,196	2.75%	New
Independent	Rajaramka Maheshkumar Gopikisan	1,640	2.06%	New
Independent	Madavi Mansingh Ramsingh	939	1.18%	New
Independent	Sakharwade Tukaram Sakharam	913	1.15%	New
Margin of victory		5,135	6.44%	▲2.08
Turnout		81,123	71.76%	▲4.87
Total valid votes		79,720		
Registered electors		113,041		▲6.69
JP gain from INC(I)		Swing	▼5.67	

=== Assembly Election 1980 ===
1980 Maharashtra Legislative Assembly election : Tumsar
Party	Candidate	Votes	%	±%
INC(I)	Karemore Subhashchandra Narayanraoji	34,991	50.24%	▲6.83
JP	Patle Ishwardayal Mahipalji	31,954	45.88%	New
Independent	Korde Jagdish Atmaram	1,664	2.39%	New
Independent	Korche Nandram Mangal	543	0.78%	New
RPI(K)	Vaidya Udebhan Khushal	494	0.71%	New
Margin of victory		3,037	4.36%	▼18.33
Turnout		70,869	66.89%	▼13.11
Total valid votes		69,646		
Registered electors		105,948		▲6.19
INC(I) hold		Swing	▲6.83	

=== Assembly Election 1978 ===
1978 Maharashtra Legislative Assembly election : Tumsar
Party	Candidate	Votes	%	±%
INC(I)	Karemore Subhashchandra Narayanraoji	33,490	43.41%	New
JP	Patel Ishwardayal Mahipalji	15,982	20.72%	New
INC	Thakre Shamrao Ramchandrarao	12,910	16.73%	▼26.86
Independent	Sayare Namdeorao Tambaji	4,028	5.22%	New
CPI	Malawar Radhesham Urkudaji	2,751	3.57%	New
Independent	Marskole Gopichand Ratiram	2,002	2.60%	New
Independent	Karamore Kisan Sitaramji	1,929	2.50%	New
Independent	Gaidhane Yadaorao Madhaorao	1,553	2.01%	New
Margin of victory		17,508	22.69%	▲20.45
Turnout		79,818	80.00%	▲12.74
Total valid votes		77,145		
Registered electors		99,771		▲3.39
INC(I) gain from INC		Swing	▼0.18	

=== Assembly Election 1972 ===
1972 Maharashtra Legislative Assembly election : Tumsar
Party	Candidate	Votes	%	±%
INC	Keshaorao Pardhi	27,334	43.59%	▼4.10
RPI	Shamrao R. Thakre	25,931	41.35%	▲17.55
Independent	Yadao Madhaorao Gaidhane	6,168	9.84%	New
RPI(K)	Lokchand Biptuji Kathane	3,168	5.05%	New
Margin of victory		1,403	2.24%	▼21.64
Turnout		64,904	67.26%	▼4.41
Total valid votes		62,705		
Registered electors		96,495		▲4.48
INC hold		Swing	▼4.10	

=== Assembly Election 1967 ===
1967 Maharashtra Legislative Assembly election : Tumsar
Party	Candidate	Votes	%	±%
INC	Keshaorao Pardhi	29,171	47.69%	▲11.86
RPI	D. P. Rewatkar	14,561	23.80%	New
SSP	N. S. Karemore	12,630	20.65%	New
ABJS	M. Y. Kapase	3,398	5.56%	New
Independent	S. F. Mesharam	1,410	2.31%	New
Margin of victory		14,610	23.88%	▲13.65
Turnout		66,191	71.67%	▲12.77
Total valid votes		61,170		
Registered electors		92,360		▲13.40
INC hold		Swing	▲11.86	

=== Assembly Election 1962 ===
1962 Maharashtra Legislative Assembly election : Tumsar
Party	Candidate	Votes	%	±%
INC	Ram Bakaramji Lanjewar	15,453	35.83%	▼12.72
PWPI	Kesjaprap Losamrap Kawale	11,040	25.60%	New
Independent	Dhanpal Tursiram Bisne	9,020	20.91%	New
Independent	Deochand Bajirao	2,010	4.66%	New
Independent	Zingar Nathu Chaudhari	1,782	4.13%	New
Independent	Sambhuji Fanduji Meshram	1,611	3.74%	New
Socialist	Keshao Mohan Purohit	1,230	2.85%	New
Margin of victory		4,413	10.23%	▼17.75
Turnout		47,972	58.90%	▲0.19
Total valid votes		43,130		
Registered electors		81,445		▲12.68
INC hold		Swing	▼12.72	

=== Assembly Election 1957 ===
1957 Bombay State Legislative Assembly election : Tumsar
Party	Candidate	Votes	%	±%
INC	Makade Aoo Malku	20,599	48.55%	▲3.73
PSP	Karemore Narayanrao Sambhuji	8,728	20.57%	New
SCF	Meshram Sambhu Fandu	8,350	19.68%	New
Independent	Chaudhari Zingar Nathu	2,301	5.42%	New
Independent	Badwaik Govinda Laku	1,478	3.48%	New
Independent	Wasnik Laxman Maroti	976	2.30%	New
Margin of victory		11,871	27.98%	▲27.43
Turnout		42,432	58.71%	▼1.92
Total valid votes		42,432		
Registered electors		72,277		▲64.24
INC gain from Socialist		Swing	▲3.19	

=== Assembly Election 1952 ===
1952 Hyderabad State Legislative Assembly election : Tumsar
Party	Candidate	Votes	%	±%
Socialist	Narayan Sambhuji Karemore	12,103	45.36%	New
INC	A. M. Makade	11,957	44.82%	New
ABJS	Madhaorao Sheolal	1,595	5.98%	New
KMPP	Zingar Nathu	1,025	3.84%	New
Margin of victory		146	0.55%	
Turnout		26,680	60.63%	
Total valid votes		26,680		
Registered electors		44,007		
Socialist win (new seat)				

== See also ==
- Tumsar
- List of constituencies of Maharashtra Vidhan Sabha
