= Charan Waghmare =

Indian politician

Charan Bhau Waghmare

Member of Maharashtra Legislative Assembly
- In office 30 December 2014 – 24 October 2019
- Preceded by: Anil Bawankar
- Succeeded by: Raju Manikrao Karemore
- Constituency: Tumsar

Personal details
- Born: 8 January 1972 (age 54)
- Party: Nationalist Congress Party (SharadChandra Pawar) (NCP(SP)) (2024–present)
- Other political affiliations: Bharat Rashtra Samithi (2023–2024); Bhartiya Janata Party(2010–2019) & (2020–2022); Nationalist Congress Party (NCP) (2004–2009); Shiv Sena (SS) (1993–2004)
- Spouse: Vijayshree Charanbhau Waghmare
- Children: Gunj Charan Waghmare
- As of 25 October 2024

Charan Sovinda Waghmare is a politician who served as a member of the 13th Maharashtra Legislative Assembly from 2014 to 2019. He was elected as MLA from the Tumsar - Mohadi Assembly Constituency. And he is very likely known leader in his constituency. He belonged to the local established party Vikas Foundation as chairperson and he is member of Nationalist Congress Party (SharadChandra Pawar) (NCP(SP)). In 2012, Waghmare was chairman of finance and works committee of Bhandara Zilla Parishad. In 2014 he was President of Bhandara District BJP.

== Career ==
Charan Waghmare was chairman of the working committee of Bhandara Zilla Parishad (BZP) between June–July 2010 to January 2013. When he finished his term in 2019, he opened a branch of Vikas Foundation 2019.

=== Maharashtra Legislative Assembly Election 2019 ===
For the 2019 Maharashtra Legislative Assembly elections, BJP denied ticket for the Tumsar Assembly Constituency to Charan Waghmare, instead chose Pradeep Motiram Padole. In the aftermath, Charan Waghmare decided to contest the election as an independent candidate. He narrowly lost to sitting MLA Raju Karemore. Charan Waghmare was subsequently expelled from BJP for contesting the election as an independent candidate. Later he had rejoined Bharatiya Janata Party (BJP) in January 2020.

=== Bhandara Zilla Parishad Election 2022 ===
For 2022 Bhandara Zilla Parishad Election, Charan Waghmare was made Bhandara Zilla Parishad Election Head from (BJP).

On 10 May 2022, Charan Waghmare was expelled from Bharatiya Janata Party (BJP) for supporting Nana Patole's Congress based Panel in Bhandara Zilla Parishad (BZP) Election.

=== Bharat Rashtra Samithi (BRS) Entry in Maharashtra 2023 ===
On 28 April 2023, Charan Waghmare joined Bharat Rashtra Samithi (BRS) with thousands of his supporters in presence of former Chief Minister of Telangana, Kalvakuntala Chandrashekar Rao (KCR).

=== Joining Nationalist Congress Party (SharadChandra Pawar) 2024 ===
On 13 October 2024, after Bharat Rashtra Samithi (BRS) lost Telangana Assembly Election 2023 they withdrew their Party Extension in Maharashtra. Charan Waghmare then joined Nationalist Congress Party (SharadChandra Pawar) (NCP(SP)) with thousands of his supporters in presence of President of the Nationalist Congress Party (Sharadchandra Pawar), Shri Sharad Pawar, Jayant Patil, Supriya Sule.
