= Ramchandra Punaji Avsare =

Indian politician

Ramchandra Avsare

Member of the Maharashtra Legislative Assembly for Bhandara
- In office 19 October 2014 – 24 October 2019
- Preceded by: Narendra Bhojraj Bhondekar
- Succeeded by: Narendra Bhojraj Bhondekar

Personal details
- Died: 03/05/2023 pauni
- Party: Bhartiya Janata Party
- Occupation: Politician
- As of 28 July, 2016

Ramchandra Punaji Avsare is a member of the 13th Maharashtra Legislative Assembly. He represented the Bhandara Assembly Constituency. He belongs to the Bharatiya Janata Party (BJP) Avsare's victory was part of a clean sweep made by BJP in Bhandara district. In 2009 he was with the Shiv Sena. In June 2015, it was reported that his election was challenged in court by one Ranjit Chavan. A special bench under Justice Prasanna Varale has been established to deal with the case.
