= Rajesh Lahanu Kashiwar =

Indian politician

Rajesh Kashiwar

Member of the Maharashtra Legislative Assembly for Sakoli
- In office 19 October 2014 – 24 October 2019
- Preceded by: Nana Patole
- Succeeded by: Nana Patole

Personal details
- Party: Bhartiya Janata Party
- Occupation: Politician
- As of 28 July, 2016

Rajesh Lahanu Kashiwar also known as Bala Kashiwar is a member of the 13th Maharashtra Legislative Assembly. He represents the Sakoli Assembly Constituency. He belongs to the Bharatiya Janata Party (BJP). He has been described as amongst the "young faces of BJP" in the assembly. His victory was part of a clean sweep made by BJP in Bhandara district.

In February 2012, he was member of the Bhandara Zilla Parishad representing Ekodi Zilla Parishad Constituency.
