= Madhukar Kukde =

Indian politician

Madhukar Yashwantrao Kukde

Member of Parliament for Bhandara-Gondiya
- In office 31 May 2018 – 23 May 2019
- Preceded by: Nana Patole
- Succeeded by: Sunil Baburao Mendhe

Member of the Maharashtra Assembly for Tumsar
- In office 1995–2009
- Preceded by: Subhashchandra Karemore
- Succeeded by: Anil Bawankar

Personal details
- Born: Tumsar
- Party: Nationalist Congress Party (SharadChandra Pawar) (NCP(SP)) (2014–present); Bhartiya Janata Party (till 2014)
- Children: Monal Kukde, Pallavi Kukde
- Occupation: Politician

Madhukar Yashwantrao Kukde is an Indian politician and former member of Parliament. Since 2018–19, he represents the Bhandara-Gondiya Lok Sabha constituency in India, a seat he won as a member of the Nationalist Congress Party (SharadChandra Pawar) (NCP(SP)). He previously spent three terms (1995–2009) in the Maharashtra Legislative Assembly representing the Tumsar constituency but as a member of the Bharatiya Janata Party.

Lok Sabha
Preceded by Nanabhau Patole	Member of Parliament for Bhandara–Gondiya; 2018 – present	Succeeded by Incumbent
