= Manohar Chandrikapure =

Indian politician

Member of the Maharashtra Legislative Assembly
- In office 26 November 2019 – 2024
- Preceded by: Rajkumar Badole
- Succeeded by: Rajkumar Badole
- Constituency: Arjuni-Morgaon

Personal details
- Born: Manohar Gowardhan Chandrikapure; 1955 or 1956 (age 69–70)
- Party: Prahar Janshakti Party (2024-present)
- Other political affiliations: Nationalist Congress Party (Ajit Pawar) (2023-2024)
- Education: College of Agriculture, Nagpur (BSc)
- Profession: Politician; agriculturalist

Manohar Gowardhan Chandrikapure is an Indian politician and a member of the 14th Maharashtra Legislative Assembly elected from the Arjuni-Morgaon constituency in the 2019 Maharashtra Legislative Assembly election as a Nationalist Congress Party candidate. He joined Prahar Janshakti Party in October 2024.

== Early life ==
Chandrikapure was born to Govardhan Chandrikapure and hails from the village of Bamhani of Sadak Arjuni taluka in Gondia district of Maharashtra. He studied Higher Secondary in 1971-72 under HSC Board, Nagpur from Adarsh College, Amgaon. He is a Bachelor of Science which he completed from College of Agriculture, Nagpur in March 1975.

== Political career ==
In 2019 Maharashtra Legislative Assembly election, Chandrikapure won from Arjuni-Morgaon seat as a Nationalist Congress Party (NCP) candidate, defeating two-time winner Rajkumar Badole of BJP.

In October 2024, Chandrikapure joined Prahar Janshakti Party after being denied nomination for the upcoming legislative assembly election in November despite being the sitting MLA. The Nationalist Congress Party leadership had nominated his rival Rajkumar Badole instead, who went on to win from the seat.
