= Gopaldas Shankarlal Agrawal =

Indian politician

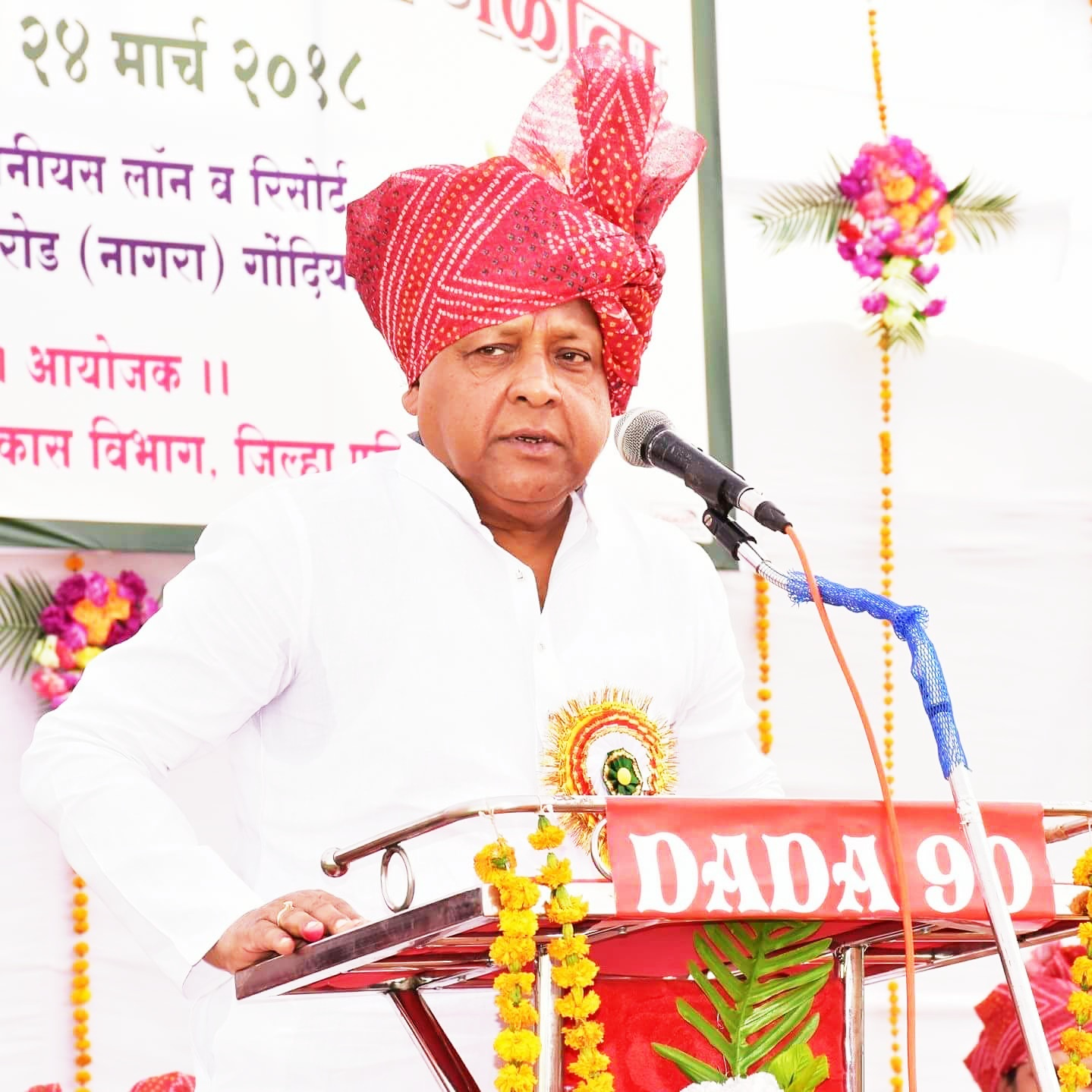
- Agrawal during March 2018

Member of Maharashtra Legislative Assembly
- In office 2004–2019
- Preceded by: Kuthe Rameshkumar Sampatrao
- Succeeded by: Vinod Agrawal
- Constituency: Gondia

Personal details
- Born: 27 July 1951 (age 75) Gondia, Maharashtra, India
- Party: Indian National Congress (Before 2019), (2024-Present)
- Other political affiliations: Bharatiya Janata Party (2019-2024)
- Occupation: Politician

Gopaldas Shankarlal Agrawal was a member of the 13th Maharashtra Legislative Assembly. He represented the Gondiya Assembly constituency and is a member of the Indian National Congress.

He joined Bharatiya Janata Party ahead of 2019 Maharashtra Legislative Assembly election. He rejoined Congress in 2024 before the Maharashtra polls and his departure from BJP is seen as a huge blow to the party's influence in the Vidarbha region.

But cannot retained seat.he currently retired from politic.no chances of him seeing again.
