= Nana Patole =

Indian politician (born 1963)

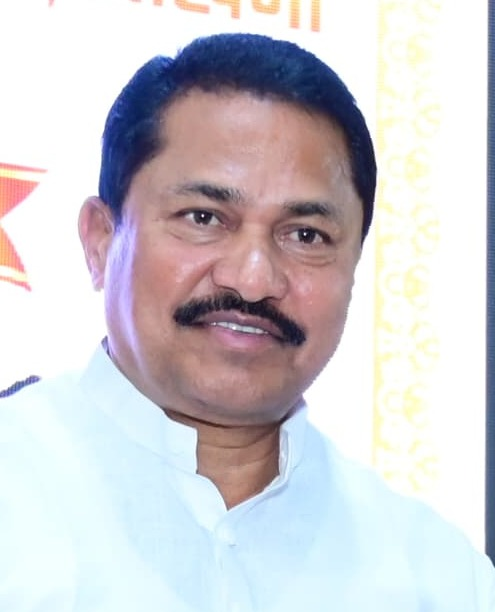
- Patole in 2025

24th President of Maharashtra Pradesh Congress Committee
- In office 5 February 2021 – 13 February 2025
- AICC President: Sonia Gandhi; Mallikarjun Kharge
- Preceded by: Balasaheb Thorat
- Succeeded by: Harshwardhan Vasantrao Sapkal

15th Speaker of the Maharashtra Legislative Assembly
- In office 2 December 2019 – 4 February 2021
- Governor: Bhagat Singh Koshyari
- Deputy: Zirwal Narhari Sitaram
- Preceded by: Haribhau Bagade
- Succeeded by: Zirwal Narhari Sitaram (acting); Rahul Narwekar

Member of Maharashtra Legislative Assembly
- Incumbent
- Assumed office 21 October 2019
- Preceded by: Rajesh Lahanu Kashiwar
- Constituency: Sakoli
- In office 27 November 2009 – 19 October 2014
- Preceded by: Sevakbhau Nirdhanji Waghaye (Patil)
- Succeeded by: Rajesh Lahanu Kashiwar
- Constituency: Sakoli
- In office 1999–2009
- Preceded by: Kapgate Dayaram Maroti
- Succeeded by: Constituency abolished
- Constituency: Lakhandur

Member of Parliament, Lok Sabha
- In office 19 May 2014 – 31 May 2018
- Preceded by: Praful Patel
- Succeeded by: Madhukar Kukde
- Constituency: Bhandara–Gondiya, Maharashtra

Personal details
- Born: Nanabhau Falgunrao Patole; 5 June 1963 (age 63) Bhandara, Maharashtra, India
- Party: Indian National Congress (since 2018; 1999–2014)
- Other political affiliations: Bharatiya Janata Party (2014–2017)
- Spouse: Mangla Patole (m. 1991)
- Children: 3
- Occupation: Politician

Nanabhau Falgunrao Patole (born 5 June 1963) is an Indian politician and a member of the Indian National Congress Party and a former President of the Maharashtra Pradesh Congress Committee from 2021 till 2025.

== Early life ==
Nana Patole was born on June 5, 1963, in Gondia, Maharashtra to Falgunrao Patole and Mirabai Patole. His father worked as an agricultural officer, while his mother was a housewife. Patole completed his primary education in Sakoli and pursued his secondary and higher secondary education in schools in Gondia and Chandrapur. He completed his college education BA from Manoharbhai Patel College (MBPC) in Sakoli, Maharashtra.

He focused on the issues faced by farmers and marginalized communities. In response to the government's Forest-Land Act, Patole organized an anti-encroachment march on September 5, 2022 and was detained and later went on hunger strike in jail to seek justice. Later government suspended the encroachment removal program.

He takes the credit on completion of Durgabai Doh dam project on the Chulband River, which began in 1995 and was finished in 2015, providing irrigation to 9,634 hectares of farmland and benefiting multiple villages.

== Political career ==
As a member of Indian National Congress party, he served as a Member of the Legislative Assembly for Lakhandur Assembly constituency after delimitation he served as member of Sakoli from 2009. He also held the position of Leader of the Opposition in the Maharashtra Legislative Assembly for a short term. In the 2014 Lok Sabha elections, he contested as the Bharatiya Janata Party candidate from Bhandara–Gondiya Lok Sabha constituency and secured victory, defeating then Union Minister Praful Patel of Nationalist Congress Party by a margin of 149,254 votes. In 2018, Patole resigned from his Lok Sabha membership by submitting his resignation letter to Speaker Sumitra Mahajan and subsequently rejoined the Indian National Congress.

=== Positions held ===
- 1990 : Bhandara Zilla Parishad Member from Sangadi Zilla Parishad Constituency, Bhandara district.
- 1998 – 1999 - Patole was elected as an MLA from Lakhandur Assembly Constituency.
- 2004 – Elected as an MLA for the second time.
- 2008 - Patole resigned from the Congress Party and joined the Bharatiya Janata Party.
- 2014 - He was elected as MP in 16- Bhandara-Gondia Lok Sabha Constituency.
- 2014 - He was a member of the Standing Committee on Science and Technology and Environment and Forests.
- 2015 to 2017 - Member of the Railway Convention Committee (RCC) and a member of the Advisory Committee in the Ministry of Agriculture.
- 2017 - He resigned from Lok Sabha Membership and Bharatiya Janata Party due to controversy over issues of farmers and other backward classes.
- 2018 – He was appointed President of all India Kisan Congress.
- 2019- He was promoted to the post of Assembly Speaker.
- 2021- appointed the President of Maharashtra Pradesh Congress Committee.
- 2024- Elected as an MLA

Lok Sabha
Preceded by Praful Patel	Member of Parliament for Bhandara–Gondiya; 2014–2018	Succeeded by Madhukar Kukde
