= Sunil Baburao Mendhe =

Indian politician (born 1968)

Sunil Mendhe

Member of Parliament, Lok Sabha
- In office 23 May 2019 – 04 June 2024
- Preceded by: Madhukar Kukde
- Succeeded by: Prashant Yadaorao Padole
- Constituency: Bhandara-Gondiya

Personal details
- Born: 14 April 1968 (age 58) At.Murmadi, Lakhni Taluka, Bhandara District
- Party: Bharatiya Janata Party
- Education: diploma in Civil Engineering
- Occupation: social worker, Politician

Sunil Baburao Mendhe is an Indian politician and Member of Parliament to the 17th Lok Sabha from Bhandara–Gondiya Lok Sabha constituency, Maharashtra. He won the 2019 Indian general election as a Bharatiya Janata Party candidate.

Sunil Mendhe was born to Pratibha and Baburao Mendhe, a middle class family in the year 1968 in Bhandara District, Maharashtra. He lived and studied with his parents until the age of 16, when he completed his school education. Thereafter, he moved to Wardha, Maharashtra, to pursue his career interest in Civil Engineering. He had a keen interest in the construction & infrastructure industry. After completing his Diploma in Civil Engineering, he began working to gain experience in the industry. He worked with Ar. Ram Gopal Aswale as a junior engineer. It was in the year 1992, he established his own infrastructure company and achieved great milestones.

As a young boy, he was deeply inspired by the stories of social workers and patriots and he always wanted to contribute to national development. After joining the Rashtriya Swayamsevak Sangh (RSS) in 1987, he found a platform to serve his motherland. Since then, he was an active member of the RSS with responsibilities for various national development activities. Later, he continued to serve the nation, participated in Karsevak activity for Ram Mandir, and joined the Bajrang Dal as Jilha-Pramukh in the year 1989.

Exploring and working in the interest of people, In the year 2016 he got elected as Mayor for Bhandara Municipal Council and further continued to contest Member of Parliament election from Bhandara – Gondia constituency in the year of 2019. He won the 2019 Indian general election as a Bharatiya Janata Party candidate. This Bhandara-Gondia Constituency was considered one of the most difficult seats to win for BJP However, he won the elections by 2 Lakhs Votes.

== Maharashtra Lok Sabha Ticket 2024 ==
On 25 March 2024, Bharatiya Janata Party (BJP) Offered Ticket from Bhandara-Gondia Lok Sabha Seat to Sunil Mendhe for the 2nd Consecutive Time.
