= Vinod Agrawal =

Indian politician

Vinod Santoshkumar Agrawal

Member of the Maharashtra Legislative Assembly
- Incumbent
- Assumed office (2019-2024), (2024-Present)
- Preceded by: Gopaldas Shankarlal Agrawal
- Constituency: Gondiya

Personal details
- Born: 4 June 1970 (age 55) Gondia, Maharashtra
- Party: Bharatiya Janata Party (Before 2019) & (2022-Present)
- Other political affiliations: Independent (2019-2022)

Vinod Santoshkumar Agrawal is an Indian politician. He was elected to the Maharashtra Legislative Assembly from Gondiya in the 2019 Maharashtra Legislative Assembly election as an Independent candidate. Previously, he was associated with Bharatiya Janata Party. Later on 23 June he again joined BJP in between 2022 Maharashtra political crisis.

== Political career ==
Vinod Agrawal is a member of the Rashtriya Swayamsevak Sangh (RSS), a far-right Hindu nationalist paramilitary volunteer organisation.
