= Prashant Yadaorao Padole =

Indian politician

Dr. Prashant Padole

Member of Parliament, Lok Sabha
- Incumbent
- Assumed office 4 June 2024
- Preceded by: Sunil Baburao Mendhe
- Constituency: Bhandara–Gondiya

Personal details
- Born: 24 September 1978 (age 48) Bhandara, Maharashtra
- Party: Indian National Congress

Dr. Prashant Yadaorao Padole is an Indian politician. He is a member of Indian National Congress.

== Political career ==
Padole was elected in 2024 as a Member of Parliament from the Bhandara-Gondiya Lok Sabha constitutency. He defeated Sunil Baburao Mendhe of the Bharatiya Janata Party by a margin of 37,380 votes.
