= Pauni Municipal Council =

Pauni Municipal Council Class 4

Type
- Type: Municipal Council of Pauni

History
- Founded: 1867

Leadership
- President: Poonam Katekhaye, Nagar Vikas Aghadi since 16 January 2017
- Chief Officer: Dr. Vivek Meshram
- Vice-president: Kamalakar Raipurkar, INC since 16 January 2017

Structure
- Seats: 17
- Political groups: Government; Nagar Vikas Aghadi: 6 seats INC: 5 seats * Opposition NCP: 3 seats BJP: 2 seats Shivsena: 1 seat

Elections
- Voting system: First pass the post
- Last election: 18 December 2016
- Next election: TBD

Pauni Municipal Council is a Municipality body administrating Pauni City in Bhandara district of Maharashtra, India.

== History ==
Pauni constituted as Municipal Council in 1867.
