= Rajkumar Badole =

Indian politician

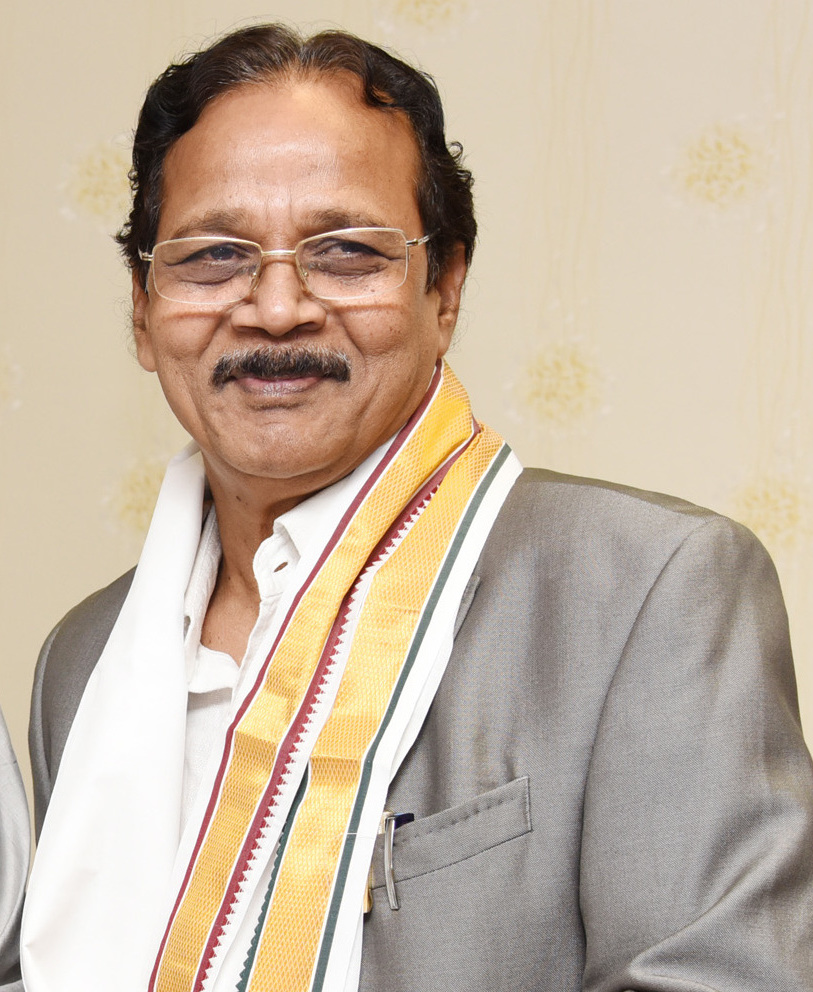

Member of Maharashtra Legislative Assembly
- Incumbent
- Assumed office 20 November 2024
- Constituency: Arjuni-Morgaon

Social Justice Minister of the Government of Maharashtra
- In office 2014–2019

Member of the Maharashtra Legislative Assembly
- In office 2009–2014
- Succeeded by: Manohar Chandrikapure
- Constituency: Arjuni-Morgaon

Personal details
- Party: Bharatiya Janata Party
- Education: Diploma in Civil Engineering
- Website: official website

Rajkumar Badole is an Indian politician. He is a member of the Bharatiya Janata Party and had represented Arjuni Morgaon in 13th Maharashtra Legislative Assembly in the First Fadnavis ministry.

== Political career ==
Rajkumar Badole started his public life in 2009 when he was elected as BJP MLA for the first time from Sadak Arjuni constituency with a win of 39000 votes. In 2014, he was elected from Arjuni Morgaon and also served as a Cabinet Minister for the Department of Social Justice and Special Assistance of Maharashtra State and the Guardian Minister for Gondia District until June 2019.

=== Positions held ===
- President, BJP Gondia District
- Member, Maharashtra Legislative Assembly - 2 consecutive terms, from 2009 to 2014 and 2014 to 2019.
- Cabinet Minister for Social Justice and Special Assistance Department, Government of Maharashtra. Year 2014 - 2019.
- 2014-2019, as Guardian Minister of Gondia district.

Political offices
| Preceded by Shivajirao Moghe | Ex.Cabinet Minister for Social Justice and Special Assistance, Maharashtra State; 31 October 2014–present | Incumbent |
| Preceded by Parinay Phuke | Ex.Maharashtra State Guardian Minister for Gondia district 2014–present | Incumbent |
