= Narendra Bhondekar =

Indian politician

Member of the Maharashtra Legislative Assembly
- Incumbent
- Assumed office October 2019
- Constituency: Bhandara

Member of the Maharashtra Legislative Assembly
- In office October 2009 – November 2014
- Constituency: Bhandara

Personal details
- Born: 26 June 1979 (age 47) Bhandara
- Party: Shiv Sena (Ekanath Shinde)
- Spouse: Ashwini Bhondekar

Narendra Bhondekar is a politician from Bhandara district, Maharashtra. He is a Member of Maharashtra Legislative Assembly from Bhandara Vidhan Sabha constituency elected as an independent candidate. He joined Eknath Shinde's Shiv Sena after the split in Shiv Sena.

Narendra Bhondekar has resigned from all party posts after he was not included in the Maharashtra cabinet on 15 December 2024.

== Positions held ==
- 2009: Elected to Maharashtra Legislative Assembly
- 2019: Re-Elected to Maharashtra Legislative Assembly
