= Arjuni-Morgaon Assembly constituency =

Constituency of the Maharashtra legislative assembly in India

Coordinates: 20.82°N 80.03°E

Arjuni Morgaon Assembly constituency
- Constituency for the Maharashtra Legislative Assembly
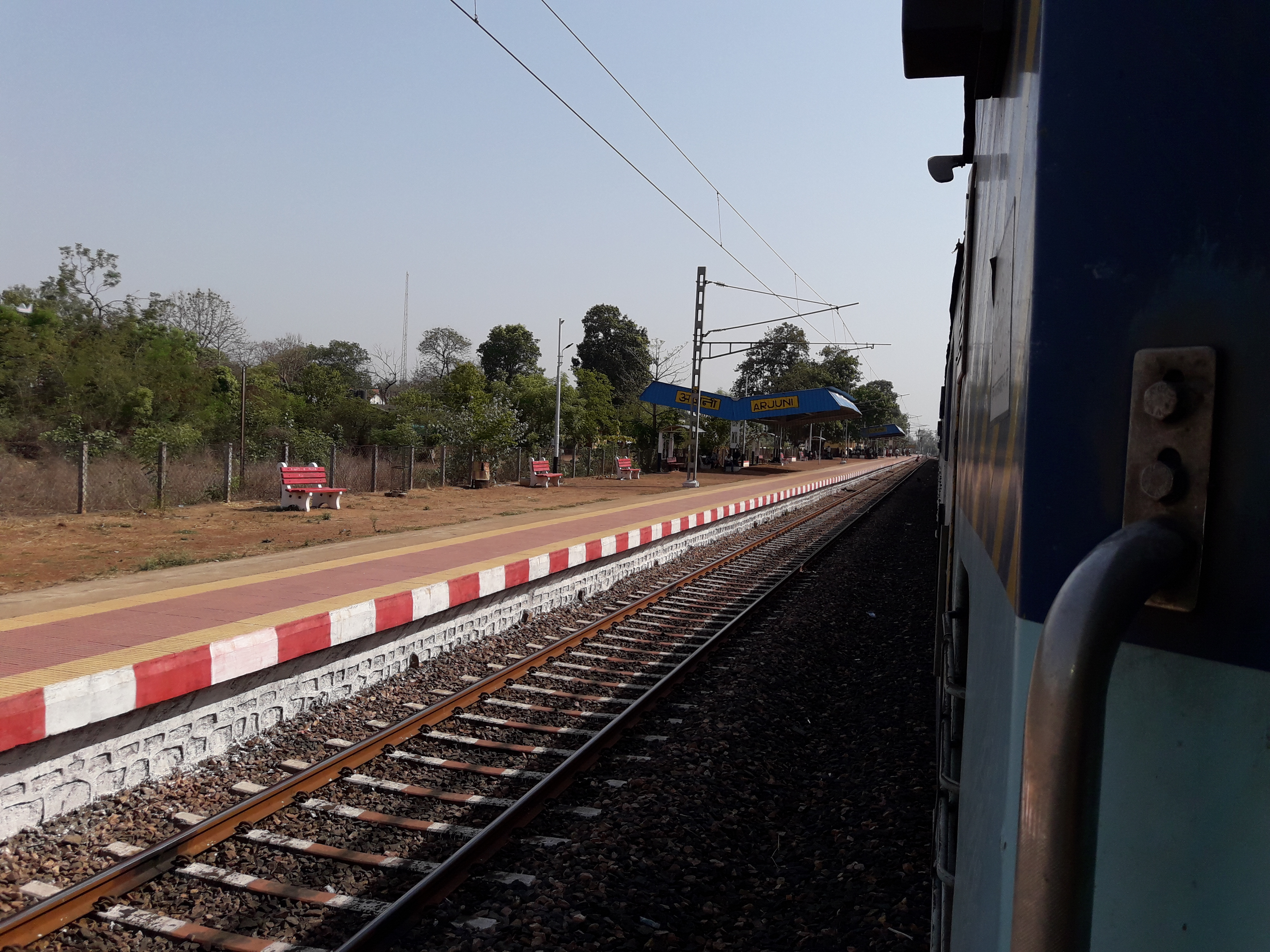

Constituency details
- Country: India
- Region: Western India
- State: Maharashtra
- District: Gondia
- Lok Sabha constituency: Bhandara–Gondiya
- Established: 1978
- Total electors: 259,324
- Reservation: SC

Member of Legislative Assembly
- 15th Maharashtra Legislative Assembly
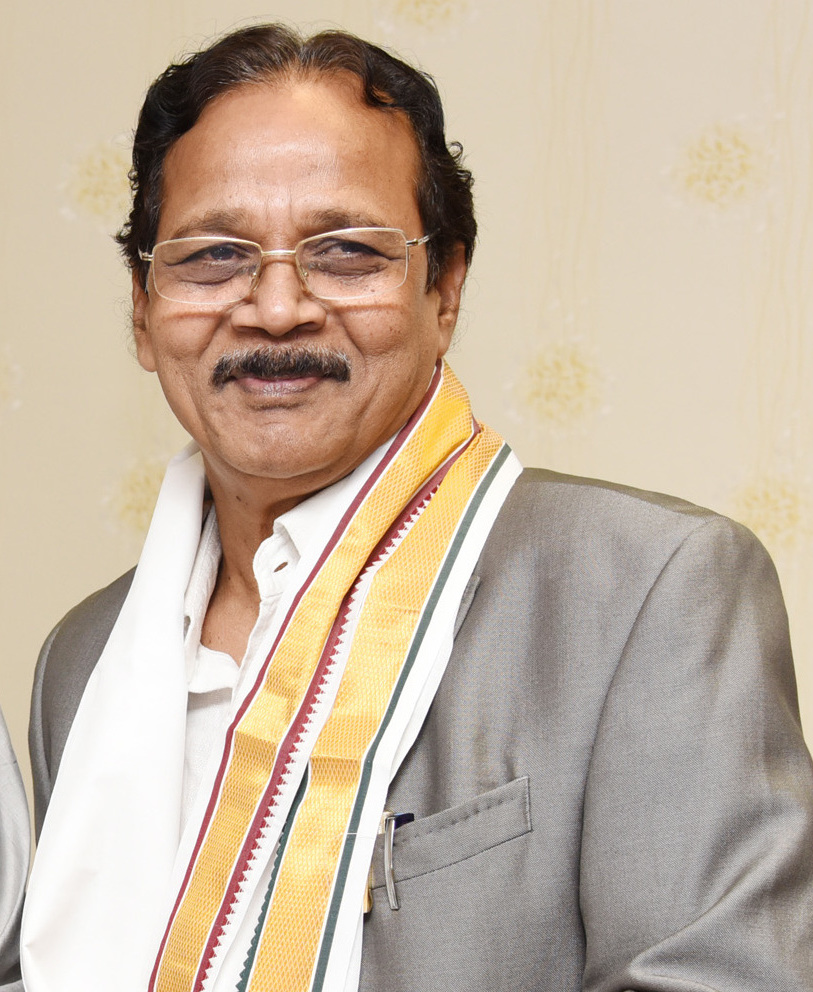
- Incumbent Rajkumar Badole
- Party: NCP
- Alliance: NDA
- Elected year: 2024

Arjuni Morgaon Assembly constituency is one of the 288 Vidhan Sabha constituency of Maharashtra state in India. This Constituency is one of the three Constituencies located in the Gondia district.

It is part of the Bhandara-Gondiya Lok Sabha constituency along with five other Vidhan Sabha segments, namely Sakoli, Bhandara, Gondia, Tumsar and Tirora.

== Geographical scope ==
The constituency comprises Sadak-Arjuni tehsil, parts of Goregaon tehesil, Revenue Circle Mohadi and Arjuni Morgaon tehsil as well as subdivision.

== Members of the Legislative Assembly ==
Year	Member	Party
Till 2009 : Constituency did not exist
2009	Rajkumar Badole	Bharatiya Janata Party
2014	Rajkumar Badole	Bharatiya Janata Party
2019	Manohar Chandrikapure	Nationalist Congress Party
2024	Rajkumar Badole	Nationalist Congress Party

== Election results ==
=== Assembly Election 2024 ===
2024 Maharashtra Legislative Assembly election : Arjuni-Morgaon
Party	Candidate	Votes	%	±%
NCP	Rajkumar Badole	82,506	45.24%	New
INC	Bansod Dilip Waman	66,091	36.24%	New
PHJSP	Chandrikapure Sugat Manohar	15,428	8.46%	New
VBA	Dinesh Ramratan Panchabhai	5,453	2.99%	▼11.69
Independent	Ajay Sambhaji Lanjewar	4,744	2.60%	New
BSP	Sachinkumar Nandgaye	1,468	0.80%	▼0.58
NOTA	None of the Above	801	0.44%	▼0.73
Margin of victory		16,415	9.00%	▲8.59
Turnout		1,83,179	70.64%	▲1.44
Total valid votes		1,82,378		
Registered electors		2,59,324		▲2.53
NCP gain from NCP		Swing	▲3.68	

=== Assembly Election 2019 ===
2019 Maharashtra Legislative Assembly election : Arjuni-Morgaon
Party	Candidate	Votes	%	±%
NCP	Manohar Chandrikapure	72,400	41.55%	▲22.77
BJP	Rajkumar Badole	71,682	41.14%	▲3.22
VBA	Ajay Sambhaji Lanjewar	25,579	14.68%	New
BSP	Shivdas Shrawan Sakhare	2,418	1.39%	▼4.65
NOTA	None of the Above	2,045	1.17%	▲0.27
Margin of victory		718	0.41%	▼17.43
Turnout		1,76,415	69.75%	▼2.14
Total valid votes		1,74,229		
Registered electors		2,52,915		▲5.79
NCP gain from BJP		Swing	▲3.63	

=== Assembly Election 2014 ===
2014 Maharashtra Legislative Assembly election : Arjuni-Morgaon
Party	Candidate	Votes	%	±%
BJP	Rajkumar Badole	64,401	37.93%	▼8.68
INC	Nandagawali Rajesh Mulchand	34,106	20.09%	▼15.64
NCP	Manohar Chandrikapure	31,893	18.78%	New
SS	Kiran Yashwant Kamble	15,336	9.03%	New
BSP	Meshram Bhimrao Karuji	10,254	6.04%	▲1.29
Independent	Ajay Sambhaji Lanjewar	4,844	2.85%	New
Independent	Gajbhiye Pramod Hiraman	3,765	2.22%	New
NOTA	None of the Above	1,528	0.90%	New
Margin of victory		30,295	17.84%	▲6.96
Turnout		1,71,504	71.74%	▼2.89
Total valid votes		1,69,805		
Registered electors		2,39,073		▲17.89
BJP hold		Swing	▼8.68	

=== Assembly Election 2009 ===
2009 Maharashtra Legislative Assembly election : Arjuni-Morgaon
Party	Candidate	Votes	%	±%
BJP	Rajkumar Badole	69,856	46.60%	New
INC	Raut Ramlal Budhaji	53,549	35.72%	▼10.59
Independent	Kiran Yashwant Kamble	10,428	6.96%	New
BSP	Shahare Karamchand Shankarrao	7,119	4.75%	New
Independent	Ghanade Manik Shamrao	3,411	2.28%	New
BBM	Ramteke Kabirdas Sawaji	2,642	1.76%	New
Independent	Gopal Jagan Alias Jayesh Barsu	949	0.63%	New
Margin of victory		16,307	10.88%	▼9.52
Turnout		1,49,919	73.93%	▲7.02
Total valid votes		1,49,896		
Registered electors		2,02,794		▲106.57
BJP gain from INC		Swing	▲0.29	

=== Assembly Election 1972 ===
1972 Maharashtra Legislative Assembly election : Arjuni-Morgaon
Party	Candidate	Votes	%	±%
INC	Paulzagade Adku Sonu	30,414	46.31%	▲8.87
ABJS	Namdeo Harbaji Diwathe	17,018	25.92%	▼3.06
RPI(K)	Ramteke Kewalram Donu	10,827	16.49%	New
RPI	Shankarrao V. Shahare	3,462	5.27%	▼19.50
SSP	Narayansing Uikey	3,240	4.93%	New
Independent	Barku Govinda Deshmukh	707	1.08%	New
Margin of victory		13,396	20.40%	▲11.93
Turnout		67,822	69.09%	▲5.37
Total valid votes		65,668		
Registered electors		98,171		▲13.98
INC hold		Swing	▲8.87	

=== Assembly Election 1967 ===
1967 Maharashtra Legislative Assembly election : Arjuni-Morgaon
Party	Candidate	Votes	%	±%
INC	Paulzagade Adku Sonu	19,840	37.44%	New
ABJS	Namdeo Harbaji Diwathe	15,353	28.98%	New
RPI	S. W. Dahiwele	13,124	24.77%	New
Independent	S. T. Nahamrute	3,848	7.26%	New
Independent	R. G. Shahare	821	1.55%	New
Margin of victory		4,487	8.47%	
Turnout		57,191	66.40%	
Total valid votes		52,986		
Registered electors		86,127		
INC win (new seat)				
