= Raju Manikrao Karemore =

Indian politician

Member of the Maharashtra Legislative Assembly
- In office 2019–Incumbent
- Preceded by: Charan Waghmare
- Constituency: Tumsar

Personal details
- Party: Nationalist Congress Party
- Occupation: Politician

Raju Manikrao Karemore is a leader of Nationalist Congress Party (Ajit Pawar) and a member of the Maharashtra Legislative Assembly elected from Tumsar Assembly constituency in Bhandara city.

== Positions held ==
- 2019: Elected to Maharashtra Legislative Assembly. (1 st Term)
- 2024: Elected to Maharashtra Legislative Assembly (2nd Term)
