= Bhandara District Council =

District Council Bhandara
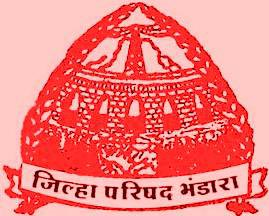

Type
- Type: Unicameral

History
- Founded: 1962

Leadership
- President: Kavita Uike, INC since 27 January 2025
- Vice-president: Eknathbhau Fendar, NCP
- Chief Executive Officer: Mr Milindkumar Sawale since 2024

Structure
- Seats: 52
- Political groups: Government; INC: 21 NCP: 13: Opposition; BJP: 12 Shivsena: 01 Independent: 5

Elections
- Voting system: First pass the post
- Last election: 22 January 2022
- Next election: TBD

Meeting place
- Zilla Parishad Building, Civil Line, Bhandara.

Website
- bhandarazp.mahapanchayat.gov.in

Zilla Parishad Bhandara or District Council Bhandara is one of the District Councils having jurisdiction on Bhandara district in Maharashtra, India.

== History ==
Zilla Parishad Bhandara was established in 1962 along with 13 Panchayat Samiti. In 1999, Bhandara district bifurcated into 2 districts and a new district having headquarters in Gondia was created. Thereafter, Zilla Parishad Bhandara also divided and new Zilla Parishad for the Gondia district was established by amalgamation with some Panchayat Samiti in it.

== Panchayat Samiti ==
Currently there are seven Panchayat Samiti under jurisdiction Zilla Parishad Bhandara.

=== List ===
1) Panchayat Samiti Bhandara
2) Panchayat Samiti Lakhandur
3) Panchayat Samiti Lakhani
4) Panchayat Samiti Mohadi
5) Panchayat Samiti Pauni
6) Panchayat Samiti Sakoli
7) Panchayat Samiti Tumsar

== Zilla Parishad Constituencies ==
Zilla Parishad Bhandara have 52 District Council Constituencies all over Bhandara district except the urban part of the district, which is administered by Municipal and Notified Area Councils.
