= Gondiya Assembly constituency =

Constituency of the Maharashtra legislative assembly in India

Coordinates: 21.46°N 80.20°E

Gondiya
- Constituency No. 65 for the Maharashtra Legislative Assembly

Constituency details
- Country: India
- Region: Western India
- State: Maharashtra
- District: Gondia
- Lok Sabha constituency: Bhandara-Gondiya
- Established: 1951
- Total electors: 326,038
- Reservation: None

Member of Legislative Assembly
- 15th Maharashtra Legislative Assembly
- Incumbent Vinod Agrawal
- Party: BJP
- Alliance: NDA
- Elected year: 2024

Gondia Assembly constituency is one of the 288 Vidhan Sabha (legislative assembly) constituencies of Maharashtra state, western India. This constituency is located in Gondia district. The delimitation of the constituency happened in 2008.

== Geographical scope ==
Parts of Gondia taluka viz. revenue circles Kamtha, Ravanwadi, Dasgaon Budruk, Gondia and Gondia Municipal Council.

== Members of the Legislative Assembly ==
Year	Member	Party
1952	Manoharbhai Patel	Indian National Congress
1957	Manoharbhai Patel	Indian National Congress
1962	Manoharbhai Patel	Indian National Congress
1967	Gopalnarayan Bajpai	Indian National Congress
1972	Gopalnarayan Bajpai	Indian National Congress
1978	Rajkumari Bajpai	Indian National Congress (I)
1980	Rajkumari Bajpai	Indian National Congress (I)
1985	Rajkumari Bajpai	Indian National Congress
1990	Hariharbhai Patel	Indian National Congress
1995	Rameshkumar Kuthe	Shiv Sena
1999	Rameshkumar Kuthe	Shiv Sena
2004	Gopaldas Agrawal	Indian National Congress
2009	Gopaldas Agrawal	Indian National Congress
2014	Gopaldas Agrawal	Indian National Congress
2019	Vinod Agrawal	Independent
2024	Vinod Agrawal	Bharatiya Janata Party

== Election results ==
=== Assembly Election 2024 ===
2024 Maharashtra Legislative Assembly election : Gondiya
Party	Candidate	Votes	%	±%
BJP	Vinod Agrawal	143,012	61.59%	▲25.05
INC	Gopaldas Shankarlal Agrawal	81,404	35.06%	▲30.75
BSP	Narendra Suhagan Meshram	4,386	1.89%	▼0.38
NOTA	None of the above	1,471	0.63%	▼0.26
Margin of victory		61,608	26.53%	▲13.44
Turnout		233,658	71.67%	▲6.61
Total valid votes		232,187		
Registered electors		326,038		▲1.18
BJP gain from Independent		Swing	▲11.96	

=== Assembly Election 2019 ===
2019 Maharashtra Legislative Assembly election : Gondiya
Party	Candidate	Votes	%	±%
Independent	Vinod Agrawal	102,996	49.63%	New
BJP	Gopaldas Shankarlal Agrawal	75,827	36.54%	▲9.89
INC	Amar Prabhakar Warade	8,938	4.31%	▼27.86
Independent	Kamlesh Murlidhar Ukey	5,246	2.53%	New
BSP	Dhurwas Bhaiyalal Bhoyar	4,704	2.27%	▼5.80
VBA	Janardan Mohanji Bankar	3,810	1.84%	New
NOTA	None of the above	1,857	0.89%	▲0.46
Margin of victory		27,169	13.09%	▲7.57
Turnout		209,660	65.06%	▼1.47
Total valid votes		207,527		
Registered electors		322,248		▲9.46
Independent gain from INC		Swing	▲17.46	

=== Assembly Election 2014 ===
2014 Maharashtra Legislative Assembly election : Gondiya
Party	Candidate	Votes	%	±%
INC	Gopaldas Shankarlal Agrawal	62,701	32.17%	▼14.36
BJP	Vinod Agrawal	51,943	26.65%	New
NCP	Ashok [Gappu] Laxminarayan Gupta	33,150	17.01%	New
SS	Kuthe Rajkumar Sampatrao	20,876	10.71%	▼29.71
BSP	Bansod Yogesh Madhawrao	15,725	8.07%	▲1.57
Independent	Chouragade Sureshkumar Khindulal	1,553	0.80%	New
Independent	Borkar Namdeo Motiram	1,552	0.80%	New
Independent	Meshram Laxaman Pandurang	1,547	0.79%	New
NOTA	None of the above	835	0.43%	New
Margin of victory		10,758	5.52%	▼0.59
Turnout		195,852	66.53%	▲1.44
Total valid votes		194,918		
Registered electors		294,399		▲17.37
INC hold		Swing	▼14.36	

=== Assembly Election 2009 ===
2009 Maharashtra Legislative Assembly election : Gondiya
Party	Candidate	Votes	%	±%
INC	Gopaldas Shankarlal Agrawal	75,921	46.53%	▲5.34
SS	Kuthe Rameshkumar Sampatrao	65,950	40.42%	▲3.65
BSP	Katre Bablu Shyamlal	10,599	6.50%	▼4.17
Independent	Yunus Sheku Sheikh	2,674	1.64%	New
RPI(A)	Meshram Vinod Jaykumar	1,673	1.03%	New
Independent	Jaiswal Virendrakumar Kasturchand	1,464	0.90%	New
Independent	Bhaktwarti Omprakash Nathubhau	1,315	0.81%	New
Margin of victory		9,971	6.11%	▲1.69
Turnout		163,260	65.09%	▼3.52
Total valid votes		163,169		
Registered electors		250,839		▲37.77
INC hold		Swing	▲5.34	

=== Assembly Election 2004 ===
2004 Maharashtra Legislative Assembly election : Gondiya
Party	Candidate	Votes	%	±%
INC	Gopaldas Shankarlal Agrawal	51,453	41.19%	▲13.64
SS	Kuthe Rameshkumar Sampatrao	45,932	36.77%	▼3.00
BSP	Pardhi Himmatlal Hiralal	13,334	10.67%	New
Independent	Jasani Ranjit Chaturbhuj	3,837	3.07%	New
Independent	Niwal Baban Zitru	3,616	2.89%	New
CPI	Ramteke Yadaorao Raghunath	1,407	1.13%	▼4.31
Independent	Tidke Govind	1,388	1.11%	New
Independent	Thakur Pratik Shivcharan	837	0.67%	New
Margin of victory		5,521	4.42%	▼7.80
Turnout		124,929	68.61%	▲3.36
Total valid votes		124,928		
Registered electors		182,076		▲10.17
INC gain from SS		Swing	▲1.42	

=== Assembly Election 1999 ===
1999 Maharashtra Legislative Assembly election : Gondiya
Party	Candidate	Votes	%	±%
SS	Kuthe Rameshkumar Sampatrao	40,287	39.77%	▲15.59
INC	Jain Ajitkumar Amolakchand	27,906	27.55%	▲5.38
Independent	Jaiswal Virendrakumar Kasturchand	12,245	12.09%	New
JD(S)	Agrawal Abhay Niranjanlal	11,394	11.25%	New
CPI	Ramteke Bhojraj Sakharam	5,508	5.44%	New
NCP	Raut Satish Ganpatrao	2,963	2.93%	New
Independent	Bombarde Rajkumar Dhannuji	993	0.98%	New
Margin of victory		12,381	12.22%	▲10.21
Turnout		107,828	65.25%	▼12.15
Total valid votes		101,296		
Registered electors		165,262		▲1.11
SS hold		Swing	▲15.59	

=== Assembly Election 1995 ===
1995 Maharashtra Legislative Assembly election : Gondiya
Party	Candidate	Votes	%	±%
SS	Kuthe Rameshkumar Sampatrao	29,936	24.18%	▲21.46
INC	Patel Hariharbhai Manibhai	27,451	22.17%	▼14.04
JD	Agrawal Abhaykumar Niranjanlal	21,257	17.17%	▲13.07
BBM	Jaiswal Virendrakumar Kasturchand	16,251	13.13%	New
Independent	Ambedare Dilip Mahadeo	4,920	3.97%	New
Independent	Harinkhede Dr. Kailashchandra Ramchandraji	4,688	3.79%	New
Independent	Bharadwaj Munna Budhramsingh	3,186	2.57%	New
Independent	Gajbhiye Duryodhan Raghoji	3,156	2.55%	New
Margin of victory		2,485	2.01%	▼10.98
Turnout		126,512	77.40%	▲10.35
Total valid votes		123,794		
Registered electors		163,453		▲9.05
SS gain from INC		Swing	▼12.03	

=== Assembly Election 1990 ===
1990 Maharashtra Legislative Assembly election : Gondiya
Party	Candidate	Votes	%	±%
INC	Hariharbhai Manibhai Patel	35,856	36.21%	▼1.56
BJP	Agarwal Radheshyam Harishchandra (Babli)	22,995	23.22%	New
BRP	Jaiswal Virendrakumar Kasturchand	14,946	15.09%	New
Independent	Digambar Sunau Pache	4,093	4.13%	New
JD	Jayantilal Lalaji Parmar	4,056	4.10%	New
Independent	Ingle Ashok Keshorao	3,912	3.95%	New
SS	Munna Bharadwaj Budharam Bharadwaj	2,691	2.72%	New
Independent	Goplani Devidas Pohumal	1,211	1.22%	New
Margin of victory		12,861	12.99%	▲5.07
Turnout		100,497	67.05%	▲9.08
Total valid votes		99,027		
Registered electors		149,886		▲23.05
INC hold		Swing	▼1.56	

=== Assembly Election 1985 ===
1985 Maharashtra Legislative Assembly election : Gondiya
Party	Candidate	Votes	%	±%
INC	Rajkumari Gopalnarayan Bajpayee	26,104	37.77%	New
JP	Agrawal Radheshyam Harinarayan	20,631	29.85%	New
CPI	Ramteke Bhojraj Sakharam	10,688	15.46%	▼7.57
Independent	Bombarde Rajkumar Dhannuji	5,335	7.72%	New
LKD	Bhagat Maujilal Dhaduji	3,010	4.36%	New
RPI	Gondane Bhagwan Marota	1,348	1.95%	New
Independent	Khobrekar Digamber Naklu	1,081	1.56%	New
Independent	Tukar Bhaiyalal Tikaram	468	0.68%	New
Margin of victory		5,473	7.92%	▼11.22
Turnout		70,609	57.97%	▲6.56
Total valid votes		69,112		
Registered electors		121,808		▲4.11
INC gain from INC(I)		Swing	▼4.40	

=== Assembly Election 1980 ===
1980 Maharashtra Legislative Assembly election : Gondiya
Party	Candidate	Votes	%	±%
INC(I)	Rajkumari Gopalnarayan Bajpayee	24,828	42.17%	▼9.71
CPI	Ramteke Bhojraj Sakharam	13,560	23.03%	▲12.52
BJP	Sharma Trilokinath Shivdattaram	12,777	21.70%	New
INC(U)	Nagbhire Bhuvansing Jitsing	6,302	10.70%	New
Independent	Bhagat Maujilal Dhaduji	719	1.22%	New
Margin of victory		11,268	19.14%	▼5.27
Turnout		60,148	51.41%	▼19.38
Total valid votes		58,877		
Registered electors		116,994		▲4.80
INC(I) hold		Swing	▼9.71	

=== Assembly Election 1978 ===
1978 Maharashtra Legislative Assembly election : Gondiya
Party	Candidate	Votes	%	±%
INC(I)	Rajkumari Gopalnarayan Bajpayee	39,729	51.88%	New
JP	Agrawal Radheshyam Harishchandra	21,033	27.47%	New
CPI	Ramteke Bhojraj Sakharam	8,048	10.51%	▼12.00
INC	Dhote Manoramabai Mahadeorao	5,783	7.55%	▼45.63
Independent	Turkar Bhaiyalal Tikaram	740	0.97%	New
Independent	Bapat Manohar Wasudeorao	659	0.86%	New
Margin of victory		18,696	24.41%	▼6.26
Turnout		79,025	70.79%	▲14.38
Total valid votes		76,578		
Registered electors		111,636		▲10.09
INC(I) gain from INC		Swing	▼1.30	

=== Assembly Election 1972 ===
1972 Maharashtra Legislative Assembly election : Gondiya
Party	Candidate	Votes	%	±%
INC	Gopalnarayan Shivavinayak Bajpayee	29,290	53.18%	▲6.37
CPI	Bhojraj Sakharam Ramteke	12,398	22.51%	New
ABJS	Manohar Wasudeorao Bapat	7,468	13.56%	▼12.48
RPI	Janardhanji Punaji Ganvit	5,324	9.67%	▼14.65
Independent	Ashalatabai	602	1.09%	New
Margin of victory		16,892	30.67%	▲9.90
Turnout		57,199	56.41%	▼9.96
Total valid votes		55,082		
Registered electors		101,401		▲9.14
INC hold		Swing	▲6.37	

=== Assembly Election 1967 ===
1967 Maharashtra Legislative Assembly election : Gondiya
Party	Candidate	Votes	%	±%
INC	Gopalnarayan Shivavinayak Bajpayee	27,057	46.81%	▼1.98
ABJS	H. G. Maheshwari	15,053	26.04%	New
RPI	B. C. Verma	14,057	24.32%	New
Independent	S. K. Dhote	1,082	1.87%	New
Independent	S. K. Kamde	550	0.95%	New
Margin of victory		12,004	20.77%	▲17.20
Turnout		61,662	66.37%	▼2.45
Total valid votes		57,799		
Registered electors		92,908		▲19.19
INC hold		Swing	▼1.98	

=== Assembly Election 1962 ===
1962 Maharashtra Legislative Assembly election : Gondiya
Party	Candidate	Votes	%	±%
INC	Nanoharbhai Bababhai Patel	24,118	48.79%	▲4.39
PSP	Gopalnarayan Shivavinayak Bajpayee	22,355	45.22%	▲14.31
Independent	Punaji Holu Badge	1,306	2.64%	New
ABJS	Manohar Wasudeo Bapat	593	1.20%	New
Independent	Kisan Gulma Kamble	425	0.86%	New
Independent	Vishwanath Pandurang Dongre	403	0.82%	New
Margin of victory		1,763	3.57%	▼9.92
Turnout		53,650	68.82%	▲15.84
Total valid votes		49,431		
Registered electors		77,952		▲13.56
INC hold		Swing	▲4.39	

=== Assembly Election 1957 ===
1957 Bombay State Legislative Assembly election : Gondiya
Party	Candidate	Votes	%	±%
INC	Nanoharbhai Bababhai Patel	16,148	44.40%	▲12.85
PSP	Gopalnarayan Shivavinayak Bajpayee	11,243	30.91%	New
SCF	Bansod Babulal Rangadu	8,980	24.69%	New
Margin of victory		4,905	13.49%	▲13.19
Turnout		36,371	52.98%	▼4.07
Total valid votes		36,371		
Registered electors		68,645		▲31.22
INC hold		Swing	▲12.85	

=== Assembly Election 1952 ===
1952 Hyderabad State Legislative Assembly election : Gondiya
Party	Candidate	Votes	%	±%
INC	Nanoharbhai Bababhai Patel	9,415	31.55%	New
Socialist	Gopalnarayan Shivavinayak Bajpayee	9,326	31.25%	New
Independent	Ramchandra Tulsiram Harankhede	5,211	17.46%	New
KMPP	Brijmohan Kanhaiyalal Agarwal	2,153	7.21%	New
Independent	Johansingh Sampatsingh Uke	1,409	4.72%	New
Independent	Jagdishprasad Kisanlal	632	2.12%	New
Independent	Londhulal Janglaji	436	1.46%	New
CPI	Omprakash Lalchand Mehta	354	1.19%	New
Margin of victory		89	0.30%	
Turnout		29,842	57.05%	
Total valid votes		29,842		
Registered electors		52,312		
INC win (new seat)				
