= List of Marathi films of 2005 =

A list of films produced by the Marathi language film industry based in Maharashtra in the year 2005.

== 2005 Releases ==
A list of Marathi films released in 2005.

Year	Film	Director	Cast	Release Date	Producer	Notes	Source
2005
2005	Aamhi Asu Ladke	Abhiram Bhadkamkar	Subodh Bhave, Neena Kulkarni, Girish Oak	14 December 2005 (India)	Everest Entertainment	Subodh Bhave's debut film	
2005	Dombivali Fast	Nishikant Kamat	Sandeep Kulkarni, Audumber Aphale, Ashwini Apte		Bhavika Chitra	National Film Award for Best Feature Film in Marathi in 2005. Remade in Tamil as Evano Oruvan (2007) starring R Madhavan in title role. It was made by Nishikant Kamat	
2005	Kaydyacha Bola	Chandrakant Kulkarni	Makarand Anaspure, Umesh Kamat, Mohan Agashe	4 November 2005 (India)	Everest Entertainment, Tamhankar Production	Remake of My Cousin Vinny (1992)	
2005	Khabardar	Mahesh Kothare	Bharat Jadhav, Nirmiti Sawant, Sanjay Narvekar		Jenima Films International		
2005	Kunku Zale Vairi	Nagesh Darak	Sadashiv Amrapurkar, Nagesh Bhonsle, Sayaji Shinde, Pallavi Subhash		Lakshmi Films, Shree Ganesh Chitre		
2005	Munnabhai S.S.C	Sunil Naik	Vijay Chavan, Vasudha Deshpande, Padarinath Kamble	2 August 2005 (India)	Everest Entertainment		
2005	Pak Pak Pakaak	Gautam Joglekar	Nana Patekar, Saksham Kulkarni, Narayani Shastri	15 April 2005 (India)	S.O.C. Films		
2005	Sarivar Sari	Gajendra Ahire	Bharat Jadhav, Mohan Joshi, Neena Kulkarni	20 October 2005 (India)	Shri Chintamani Vision, Everest Entertainment		
2005	Uttarayan	Bipin Nadkarni	Shivaji Satam, Neena Kulkarni, Uttara Baokar		Opticus Films	National Film Award for Best Feature Film in Marathi in 2004	
