= Bhandara Lok Sabha constituency =

Former Lok Sabha Constituency in Maharashtra, India

Coordinates: 21.2°N 79.7°E

Bhandara
- Former Lok Sabha constituency

Constituency details
- Country: India
- Region: Western India
- State: Maharashtra
- Established: 1952
- Abolished: 2009
- Reservation: None

Bhandara Lok Sabha constituency was a former Lok Sabha (parliamentary) constituency in Maharashtra state in western India. With the delimitation of the parliamentary constituencies in 2008, based on the recommendations of the Delimitation Commission of India constituted in 2002, this constituency ceased to exist; a new constituency, Bhandara–Gondiya was created in its place.

== Assembly segments ==
Bhandara Lok Sabha constituency comprised the following Vidhan Sabha (Legislative Assembly) segments:

1. Tumsar
2. Bhandara
3. Tirora
4. Gondiya
5. Goregaon (now defunct)
6. Pauni

== Members of Lok Sabha ==
Year	Member	Party
1951	Tularam Chandrabhan Sakhare	Indian National Congress
1951	Chaturbhuj Vithaldas Jasani	Indian National Congress
1954^	Ashok Ranjitram Mehta	Praja Socialist Party
1954^	B. N. Arjun	Indian National Congress
1955^	Bhaurao Borkar (1954-55); Ansuyabai Borkar (1955-57)	Indian National Congress
1957	Ramchandra Martand Hajarnavis	Indian National Congress
1957	Balkrishna Ramchandra Wasnik	Indian National Congress
1962	Ramchandra Martand Hajarnavis	Indian National Congress
1967	Ashok Ranjitram Mehta	Indian National Congress
1971	Vishwmbhardas Dube	Indian National Congress
1977	Laxmanrao Mankar	Janata Party
1980	Keshavrao Pardhi	Indian National Congress
1984	Keshavrao Pardhi	Indian National Congress
1989	Khushal Bopche	Bharatiya Janata Party
1991	Praful Patel	Indian National Congress
1996	Praful Patel	Indian National Congress
1998	Praful Patel	Indian National Congress
1999	Chunnilal Thakur	Bharatiya Janata Party
2004	Shishupal Patle	Bharatiya Janata Party
2008 onwards : See Bhandara–Gondiya Lok Sabha constituency

^ by-poll

== Election results ==
1954 Indian Lok Sabha by-election: Bhandara
Party	Candidate	Votes	%	±%
PSP	Ashok Ranjitram Mehta	149,636	21.67	N/A
INC	B.N. Arjun	1,41,164	20.44	N/A
SCF	Bhimrao Ambedkar	1,32,483	19.19	N/A
INC	R.P. Sambhuram	1,24,267	18.00	N/A
Majority		8,681	1.23	N/A
Turnout		Not available	Not available	N/A
PSP gain from INC		Swing		

== See also ==
- Bhandara–Gondiya Lok Sabha constituency ( 2009 elections of 15th Lok Sabha onwards)
- Gondia Lok Sabha constituency ( 1962 election to 3rd Lok Sabha)
