= Sayaji Shinde =

Indian actor (born 1959)

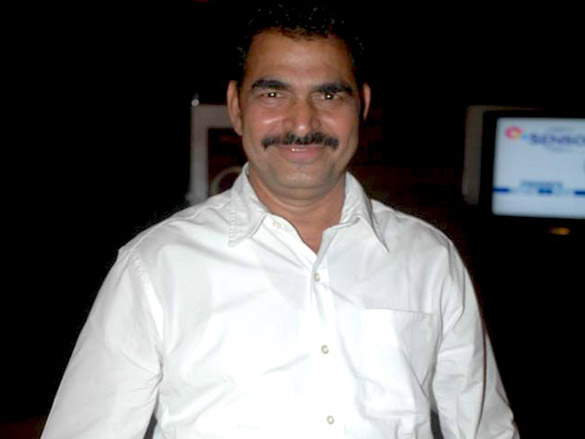
- Born: 13 January 1959 (age 67); Vele Kamthi, Bombay State, India (present-day Satara, Maharashtra)
- Occupations: Actor; producer; Politician
- Years active: 1990–present
- Political party: Nationalist Congress Party (since 2024)
- Spouse: Alka Shinde (m. 2002)
- Children: 1
- Website: www.sayajishinde.com

Sayaji Shinde (Marathi pronunciation: [səjaːd͡ʒiː ʃin̪d̪eː]; born 13 January 1959) is an Indian actor who appears in Indian films.

Sayaji started his acting career in 1978 in Marathi Plays one-act plays. His performance in a 1987 Marathi play titled Zulva was very well received, and since then he started gaining popularity among the circle of stalwarts. Later, he moved on to Marathi cinema and then started acting in other languages. He won Filmfare Award for Best Actor – Marathi for Aboli (1995) film, for his reprising debutant role "Sayaji".

Sayaji Shinde joined the Ajit Pawar-led Nationalist Congress Party (NCP) on 11 October 2024 ahead of 2024 Maharashtra Legislative Assembly Elections in the presence of Maharashtra Deputy Chief Minister Ajit Pawar, NCP working president Praful Patel, and State unit chief Sunil Tatkare.

== Early life ==
Sayaji Shinde was born on 13 January 1959 in Vele, a village in Satara district, Maharashtra, into a family of farmers. In interviews, he has described his childhood as one of poverty, stating that his family's agricultural land was submerged following the construction of a dam, leaving the family without a stable source of livelihood.

He moved to Satara for his education and earned a Bachelor of Arts degree, majoring in Marathi. While studying, he worked as a night watchman for the Irrigation Department of the Government of Maharashtra, earning ₹165 per month, and later worked as a clerk and at a co-operative bank. During his college years, Shinde became involved in amateur theatre. His interest in acting eventually led him to Mumbai, where he worked in a salaried position at a bank for seventeen years while pursuing acting in theatre.

== Career ==
Sayaji pursued acting first through Marathi theatre. He started doing one-act plays in 1978, and went on to get noticed in plays like Zulva (1987), One Room Kitchen (1989) and Amchya Ya Gharat (1991). He then moved to acting in Marathi cinema.

The co-actor Manoj Bajpayee who saw an article on the actor in a leading national daily and recommended him to Ram Gopal Varma in his 1999 action crime Hindi film Shool. Sayaji had a career breakthrough with Gnana Rajasekaran's 2000 Tamil film Bharathi, where he played Subramania Bharati, the popular poet and writer from Tamil Nadu.

He then went on to appear in Bollywood movies like Vaastu Shastra (2003), Sarkar Raj (2008), and Sanju (2018).

Sayaji Shinde has acted in a wide range of films, portraying diverse characters, including villains, supporting roles, and occasionally, comedic roles.

== Personal life ==
Shinde married Alka Shinde in 2002, who is fifteen years younger than him. The couple have a son, Siddharth Shinde. He divides his time between Mumbai and Satara, where Sahyadri Devrai is registered. He has attributed his involvement in afforestation to the death of his mother, whom he promised to plant 5,000 native trees in her memory. The pledge later grew into a larger afforestation initiative.

On 11 April 2024, Shinde was admitted to Pratibha Hospital in Satara after experiencing severe chest pain. Doctors reported a 99 per cent blockage in one of his coronary arteries, following which he underwent an emergency angioplasty.

== Other work ==
=== Film production ===
Shinde has produced Marathi films in addition to acting. He supported Nagesh Bhonsle in producing Goshta Choti Dongraevadhi, in which he also played an agriculture minister, and produced Makarand Anaspure's Dambis (2011).

=== Environmental work ===
Shinde founded Sahyadri Devrai in 2015 and serves as its president, with the organisation working to restore devrai, the community-protected sacred groves of the Western Ghats, using indigenous tree species. According to the organisation, it has planted more than 650,000 native trees at over 29 sites across Maharashtra, along with establishing tree banks, a butterfly garden and biodiversity parks.

In March 2023, Shinde narrowly escaped a swarm of bees while replanting trees that had been uprooted for the widening of the Pune–Bengaluru expressway near Taswade.

Shinde has also campaigned against tree felling. In November 2025, he opposed a plan by the Nashik Municipal Corporation to remove approximately 1,700 trees in the Tapovan area to make way for a Sadhu Gram for the Kumbh Mela. He questioned assurances of compensatory planting given by minister Girish Mahajan and criticised road-widening work in Satara district that he said would result in the removal of around 400 banyan trees. Although a member of the governing coalition's NCP, Shinde said he would oppose the state government if it proceeded with the tree removal. Deputy Chief Minister Ajit Pawar subsequently backed his position, saying environmental balance mattered as much as development, while some akhara leaders accused Shinde of misunderstanding the Kumbh Mela.

=== Politics ===
Shinde joined the Nationalist Congress Party led by Ajit Pawar on 11 October 2024 in Mumbai, ahead of the 2024 Maharashtra Legislative Assembly election. He was inducted into the party in the presence of Pawar, then Deputy Chief Minister of Maharashtra, party working president Praful Patel and state unit chief Sunil Tatkare.

Shinde said that although he had portrayed politicians on screen, he had never been one himself, and that his social work had led him to believe that working within the political system would allow him to pursue those activities more effectively. He also said that his interactions with Pawar during tree-plantation activities had influenced his decision to join the party. Pawar announced that Shinde would serve as one of the party's star campaigners for the assembly election, while minister Chhagan Bhujbal referred to him as both an actor and social activist. He did not contest the election.

== Filmography ==
Key
†	Denotes films that have not yet been released

=== Telugu ===
Year	Title	Role
2003	Tagore	Badrinarayana
2003	Veede	Byragi Naidu
2004	Andhrawala	Bade Mia
2004	Gudumba Shankar	'Bejawada' Shankar Narayana
2005	Orey Pandu	Vicky's father
2005	Super	Inspector
2005	Athadu	Shiva Reddy
2005	Andhrudu	Rana
2005	That Is Pandu	Bhagawan
2006	Devadasu	Katamraju
2006	Lakshmi	Janardhan
2006	Pokiri	Syed Mohammad Pasha Qadri
2006	Veerabhadra	Peddi Raju
2006	Naayudamma	
2006	Boss - I Love You	S.R.K.
2006	Rakhi	State Minister
2007	Lakshmi Kalyanam	President Chenchuramaiah
2007	Sri Mahalakshmi	Janardhan
2007	Aata	Police Officer
2007	Shankar Dada Zindabad	Rajalingam
2007	Dubai Seenu	Baabji
2007	Chirutha	ASP Ajay
2007	Takkari	Guru
2007	Maisamma IPS	Minister Sadhu
2007	Godava	Anjali's father
2008	Krishna	Shinde
2008	Ontari	ACP
2008	John Appa Rao 40 Plus	Razaq
2008	Chintakayala Ravi	Ramachandra Rao
2008	Sawaal	
2008	Neninthe	Film Producer
2008	King	Gopi Mohan (King's Uncle)
2009	Fitting Master	Police Officer
2009	Arundhati	Anwar
2009	Satyameva Jayate	Anand Rao
2009	Mestri	Apparaju
2009	Bangaru Babu	Narsimha Rao
2009	Kick	Kalyan's father
2009	Pistha	Minister Sivanaandi
2009	Baanam	Chandrasekhar Panigrahi
2009	Bumper Offer	Surya Prakash
2009	Arya 2	Kashi Reddy
2009	Raatri	
2010	Adhurs	Naik
2010	Varudu	Home Minister
2010	Rama Rama Krishna Krishna	DIG in Mumbai Police
2010	Don Seenu	Machiraju
2010	Maa Annayya Bangaram	Subba Raidu
2011	Vastadu Naa Raju	Home Minister
2011	Shakti	Sivaji
2011	Mr. Perfect	Maggie's uncle
2011	Seema Tapakai	Gurajada Krishnamurthy (GK)
2011	Dookudu	Minister Shivangi Meka Narasingh Rao
2011	Oosaravelli	Tony's father
2011	Solo	Vishwanath
2012	Sudigadu	Priya's father
2012	Yamudiki Mogudu	Yama
2012	Endukante... Premanta!	Krishna Rao
2012	Tuneega Tuneega	Dr. James
2012	Daruvu	Superstar Balram
2012	Businessman	Laalu Saab
2013	Jabardasth	Bihar Yadav
2013	Shadow	Chaithanya Prasad aka CP
2013	Bhai	Home Minister Pande
2013	Baadshah	IG Ramchandra
2014	Basanti	Commissioner Ali Khan
2014	Rabhasa	Dhanunjay
2014	Yamaleela 2	Yama
2014	Oka Laila Kosam	Nandana's Father
2014	Race Gurram	Chief Minister
2014	Pilla Nuvvu Leni Jeevitham	Ganga Prasad
2014	Joru	MLA Sadasivam
2014	1: Nenokkadine	Inspector Jaan Basha
2015	Bengal Tiger	Agriculture Minister Samba
2015	Sher	IPS Sharath Chandra
2015	Bruce Lee – The Fighter	Marthand
2015	Surya vs Surya	Sanjana's Father
2016	Saptagiri Express	Umesh Chandra
2016	Dhruva	Dhiraj Chandra
2016	Brahmotsavam	Rao Ramesh's brother
2016	Shourya	Maheswara Rao
2016	Hyper	Udayashankar
2016	Dictator	Bokha Sivaram
2016	Mister 420	
2017	PSV Garuda Vega	Mining Minister
2017	Oxygen	Veerabhadram
2017	Spyder	DGP Chandrasekhar
2017	Andhhagadu	ACP Dharma
2018	Amar Akbar Anthony	Jalal Akbar
2018	Touch Chesi Chudu	DGP Ramachandra Rao
2018	Hello Guru Prema Kosame	Karthik's father
2018	Pantham	CBI Officer
2018	Officer	JCP Ramdas
2018	Mehbooba	Roshan's father
2018	Inttelligent	Police Officer Mohanty
2018	Kirrak Party	Krishna's Father
2019	Ruler	Durga Prasad
2019	iSmart Shankar	CBI Officer Chandrakanth
2019	Software Sudheer	Chandu's father
2021	Vakeel Saab	Minister Shankar Reddy
2022	Godse	
2022	Godfather	Bangaram Naidu
2023	Maa Awara Zindagi	
2023	Ala Ila Ela	Anu's father
2024	Aho Vikramaarka	
2024	Double iSmart	CBI Officer Chandrakanth
2024	Maa Nanna Superhero	Srinivas
2024	Fear	
2025	Jigel	
2025	Kuberaa	SI Ashok Godbole

=== Marathi ===
Year	Title	Role
1992	Ek Hota Vidushak	Master
1994	Vazir	
1995	Aboli	Sayaji
1995	Maajhi Maanasa	
1995	Katha Doan Ganpatraonchi	
1999	Ladhaai	Vijay Nadkarni
2001	Ashi Gyaneshwari	Savle
2005	Kunku Zale Vairi	Arjun Mane Patil
2008	Gallit Gondhal, Dillit Mujra	Chandrakant Tope
2008	Oxygen-Jeev Gudmartoya	Annasaheb Patange Patil
2009	Bapu Beeru Vategaonkar	Ranga
2009	Goshta Choti Dongraevadhi	Agriculture Minister
2009	Bapu Veeru Vategaonkar	Sayaji
2009	Jai Maharashtra	
2010	Tya Ratri Paus Hota	Shripatirao
2011	Tambyacha Vishnubala	Vishnubala
2011	Don Ghadicha Daav	
2011	Bokad	
2013	Tendulkar Out	Sunil Tendulkar
2013	Sat Na Gat	Anna (Shinde)
2014	Punha Gondhal Punha Mujra	Vishwasrao Tope
2015	Mohar	Sayaji
2015	Dholki	Patil
2016	Babanchi Shala	Jailor
2017	Yuntum	Raaosaheb
2017	Shoor Aamhi Sardar	MLA Mali
2017	Bhikari	Vishwananth
2018	Love Betting	Golya Patil
2019	Tandav	
2019	Babo	Bhaskar
2022	Faas	Dr. Patil
2023	Ghar Banduk Biryani	Pallam
2023	Aadharwad	Shravan's father
2023	Aani Baani	Sarpanch
2023	Pahije Jatiche	Baba
2023	Ankush	Rana Pardeshi
2023	Sasubai Jorat	Sasrebua
2023	Ekda Yeun Tar Bagha	Nutan Sheth
2025	All Is Well	Appa
2026	The Maharashtra Files	Patil
2026	Manjar	Appasaheb Kulvant

=== Hindi ===
Year	Title	Role
1990	Disha	Soma's friend
1995	Senani Sane Guruji	
1997	Darmiyaan: In Between	Champa
1999	Shool	Bachoo Yadav
2000	Khiladi 420	Bhai's Henchman Gangster
2000	Kurukshetra	Havaldar Gopinath Surve Patil "Gopi"
2001	Aamdani Atthani Kharcha Rupaiyaa	Bijnora
2001	Shirdi Sai Baba	
2001	Avgat	Narayan Keni
2001	Daman: A Victim of Marital Violence	Sanjay Saikia
2001	Jodi No.1	Thakral John's Mama
2001	Lagi Shaarth	
2002	Karz: The Burden of Truth	Himmatbhai
2002	Pardesi Re	
2002	Road	Inspector Singh
2002	Lal Salaam	Inspector G.C. Deshpande
2002	Ansh: The Deadly Part	Govind "Edda"
2002	Kaaboo	Anna
2003	Marktet	Inspector Sawant
2003	Parwana	Yashwantrao Waghmare
2003	Calcutta Mail	Lakhan Yadav
2003	Pran Jaye Par Shaan Na Jaye	Sayaji Rane (Sheela's Husband)
2003	Danav	Thakur Raja Sahab
2004	Vaastu Shastra	Inspector Bhupal Gorpade
2004	Hanan	Inspector Pardesi
2004	Satya Bol	Shinde
2004	Mujhse Shaadi Karogi	Tommy's friend
2005	Sauda - The Deal	Blackmailer
2005	Nigehbaan: The Third Eye	
2005	Chaahat Ek Nasha	Manmohan Rangeela
2005	Jackpot	
2006	Chhal: The Game of Death	
2006	Deodhar Gandhi	
2006	Jeet: Feel the Force	
2007	Big Brother	Baburao 'Bhau' Kamble
2008	Ugly Aur Pagli	Hotel Manager
2008	Sarkar Raj	Karunesh Kaanga
2009	Team: The Force	Raman Bhai
2009	Yeh Mera India	Inspector Chandrakant Shinde
2009	Ek: The Power of One	
2018	Sanju	Bandu Dada
2018	Kaala	Maharashtra Minister
2021	Antim: The Final Truth	Head Constable
2022	Govinda Naam Mera	Ajit Dharkar
2023	Aazam	Madan Shikre
2023	Ajmer 92	DIG Shekhawat
2024	Auron Mein Kahan Dum Tha	Yeda Anna
2026	Ramyaa	Anna Shetty

=== Tamil ===
Year	Title	Role
2000	Bharathi	Subramaniya Bharathi
2001	Poovellam Un Vaasam	Rajasekar
2002	Azhagi	Dhanalakshmi's Husband
2002	Baba	Divyananda Bharathi
2003	Dhool	Minister Kalai Pandiyan
2006	Sudesi	R. C. Narayan
2007	Azhagiya Tamil Magan	Settu
2008	Vaitheeswaran	Dhanasekaran
2008	Santosh Subramaniam	Govindhan
2009	Padikkathavan	Rami Reddy
2009	Thoranai	Minister Sivanandi
2009	Thee	Rajapandian
2009	Aadhavan	Ibrahim Rowther
2009	Vettaikkaran	Kattabomman
2011	Vedi	Easwaramoorthy
2011	Velayudham	Feroz Khan
2012	Oru Kal Oru Kannadi	Mahendra Kumar
2012	Thaandavam	Ravichandran
2013	Settai	Jewelry owner
2014	Maan Karate	Sethuraman
2014	Damaal Dumeel	Kamatchi Sundaram
2015	Nannbenda	Sathya's Father
2015	Vasuvum Saravananum Onna Padichavanga	Ashok
2017	Spyder	DGP Chandrasekhar
2018	Kaala	Union Minister of Maharashtra
2018	Johnny	Kalyan
2019	Pottu	Dr. R.K.
2019	Rocky: The Revenge	Thenappan
2019	Action	Rehman
2019	Market Raja MBBS	God Father Radha
2020	Cocktail	Rajamanickam
2021	Nayae Peyae	
2021	Sabhaapathy	Lucky Raja
2022	Nenjuku Needhi	CBI Officer
2022	Gethule	Minister Mani
2023	Aghori	
2024	Indian 2	Balsingh
2024	Oru Thee	Anu's father
2025	Rajabheema	
2025	Good Bad Ugly	Alok Shukla
2025	Kuberaa	SI Ashok Godbole
2026	Yogi Da	Arivazhagan

=== Kannada ===
Year	Title	Role
1991	Patitha Pavani	
2004	Veera Kannadiga	Bade Miyan
2007	Lava Kusha	Vishakanta
2008	Porki	CM Karim Abdul Khaled
2011	Srimathi	
2012	Arakshaka	
2012	Shakti	Bachchegowda
2013	Veera	
2014	Brahma	ACP Shinde
2014	Jai Lalitha	ACP Raghav
2015	Ouija	Satan Fakir
2015	Luv U Alia	
2015	Uppi 2	
2017	Kempiruve	Politician

=== Malayalam ===
Year	Title	Role
2010	Twinkle Twinkle Little Star	
2013	Nadodimannan	Pushpam Prakashan

=== Bhojpuri ===
Year	Title	Notes
2022	Dharma	with Pawan Singh & Kajal Raghwani
2022	Rowdy Rocky	with Pradeep Pandey "Chintu"

=== English ===
Year	Title	Role
2006	Rockin Meera	Tiger Singh

=== Television ===
Year	Title	Role
1995	Aahat	uncredited role

=== Web series ===
Year	Title	Role	Language	Platform	Notes
2020	Loser	Ruby's Father	Telugu	ZEE5	
2022	Mahapaap		Hindi	ShemarooMe	
2022	Mi Punha Yein	MLA Vasant Rao Murkute	Marathi	Planet Marathi	
2022	Dhahanam	Chenna Reddy	Telugu	MX Player	
2024	Killer Soup	Arvind Shetty	Hindi	Netflix	
2024	Kalsutra	Serial killer	Marathi	JioHotstar	

=== Theatre ===
- Ghot Bhar Pani
- Surat Haravleli Pavle
- Maha Bhojan Tervachi (1984)
- Chatkor Bhakri
- Pavsacha Gan
- One Room Kitchen
- Zhulwa (1987)
- Hijada (1987)
- Ek Zunz Varyashi
- Aamchya Ya Gharat
- Sakharam Binder
- Sattevarche Shahane

== Accolades ==
Award	Year	Category	Film	Result
Filmfare Awards	2000	Best Performance in a Negative Role	Shool	Nominated
Filmfare Awards	2001	Best Supporting Actor	Kurukshetra	Nominated
Filmfare Awards Marathi	1995	Best Actor	Aboli	Won
Filmfare Awards Marathi	2024	Best Supporting Actor	Ghar Banduk Biryani	Nominated
Filmfare Awards South	2001	Best Actor – Tamil	Bharathi	Nominated
Filmfare Awards South	2006	Best Villain – Telugu	Andhrudu	Nominated
Filmfare Awards South	2010	Best Supporting Actor – Telugu	Arundhati	Nominated
Maharashtracha Favourite Kon?	2010	Favourite Villain	Gallit Gondhal, Dillit Mujra	Won
Maharashtracha Favourite Kon?	2021	Favourite Villain	Gallit Gondhal, Dillit Mujra	Nominated
Maharashtracha Favourite Kon?	2024	Favourite Villain	Ghar Banduk Biryani	Won
Sansui Viewers' Choice Movie Awards	2001	Best Supporting Actor	Kurukshetra	Nominated
Screen Awards	1998	Best Supporting Actor	Darmiyaan: In Between	Nominated
Screen Awards	2000	Best Actor in a Negative Role	Shool	Won
Screen Awards	2002	Best Actor in a Negative Role	Daman	Nominated
Screen Awards	2004	Best Actor in a Negative Role	Calcutta Mail	Nominated
Zee Cine Awards	2001	Best Actor in a Supporting Role	Kurukshetra	Nominated

=== Honours and recognitions ===
- 2022 – Responsible Film Entertainer and Conservationist Award at the CSR Journal Excellence Award
- 2024 – Natsamrat Balgandharva Gaurav Puraskar by the Government of Maharashtra
- 2025 – Media Excellence Award for contributions to environmental conservation in Maharashtra
- 2026 – Godavari Gaurav Puraskar for social work and environmental conservation
