= FIFA Finance Committee =

- Headquarters: Zürich, Switzerland
- Official language: English, French, Spanish, German
- Chairman: Alejandro Domínguez
- Deputy Chairman: Sandra Fruean
- Website: https://www.fifa.com/who-we-are/committees/committee/1882022/

The FIFA Finance Committee is one of the nine standing committees of FIFA. It focuses on the budgets and finances within FIFA.

== Membership ==
Membership
Name
Chairman
(Paraguay) Alejandro Domínguez
Deputy Chairman
(American Samoa) Sandra Fruean
Members
(British Virgin Islands) Andy Bickerton
(Papua New Guinea) Paias Bokorum
(Mali) Mariam Camara
(India) Praful Patel
(Algeria) Mohamed Raouraoua
(Hungary) Marton Vagi
(United States) Vanessa Wittman
