= Panhala (film) =

2015 Marathi-language film

- Directed by: Nagesh Bhosle
- Produced by: Nagesh Bhosle; Leena Deshmukh
- Starring: Nagesh Bhosle; Sangram Salvi; Samidha Guru; Amruta Sant; Makrand Deshpande
- Cinematography: Amarendra Bhosle
- Edited by: Sunil Jadhav
- Music by: Anand Lukand
- Production company: Ajna Motion Picture
- Release date: 24 July 2015
- Country: India
- Language: Marathi

Panhala is an Indian Marathi language film directed by Nagesh Bhosle and produced by Nagesh Bhosle and Leena Deshmukh. The film stars Nagesh Bhosle, Sangram Salvi, Samidha Guru, Amruta Sant and Makrand Deshpande. It was released on 24 July 2015.

== Synopsis ==
The lives of two married couples, who come to Panhala, change after an unfortunate accident occurs where history repeats itself.

== Cast ==
- Nagesh Bhosle as Balkrishna
- Sangram Salvi as swastik
- Samidha Guru as Sneha
- Amruta Sant as Madhavi
- Makrand Deshpande as Ajay

== Soundtrack ==
Panhala

Soundtrack album by Anand Lukand
- Released: 2015
- Recorded: 2015
- Genre: Feature film soundtrack
- Length: 4:13
- Language: Marathi

Official audio
- Panhala – Full Album on YouTube

Track listing
No.	Title	Singer(s)	Length
1.	"Is There"	Rohit Das, Nagesh Bhosle.	4:13
Total length:			4:13

== Critical response ==
Panhala film received negative reviews from critics. Mihir Bhanage of The Times of India gave the film 2 stars out of 5 and wrote "The landscapes of Panhala have been captured well but that apart, the film disappoints". Ganesh Matkari of Pune Mirror wrote " While it would work in a play where the action is restricted by the stage space, in the open universe of cinema it feels odd. It’s a minor obstacle when you look at the entire film, but considering how our audience craves for a neat and clean resolution it may just be a step in the wrong direction". Jaydeep Pathak of Maharashtra Times wrote "Even though 'Panhala' is somewhat right in content, it fails in presentation. The lack of a strong screenplay linking the context of contemporary reality with the history of Panhala is clearly visible here".
