= Mrunalini Bhosale =

Indian filmmaker

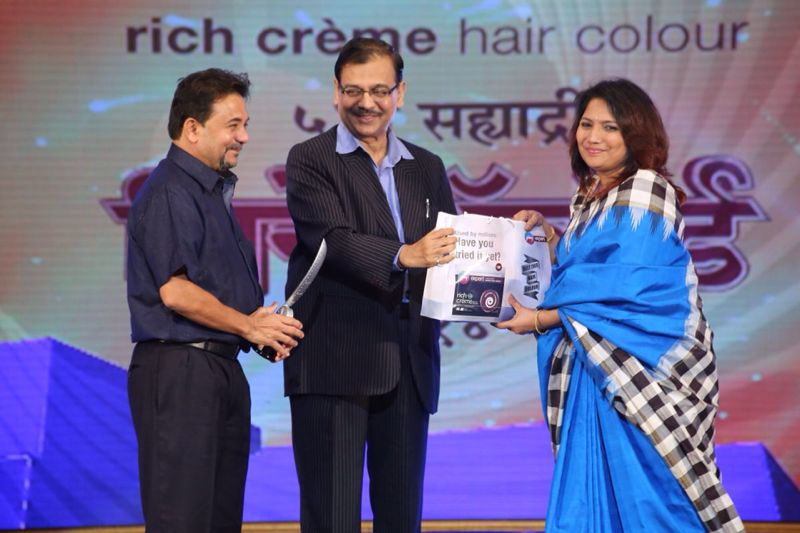
- Mrunalini Bhosale accepting the Sahyadri Cine Award 2014 for the Best Feature Film - Kapus Kondyachi Goshta
- Occupation: Film director
- Years active: present
- Spouse: Mr. Ravindra Bhosale
- Children: Taniya and Yuvraj Bhosale

Mrunalini Bhosale is an Indian filmmaker. She made her directorial debut with the critically acclaimed feminist agrarian feature film Kapus Kondyachi Goshta (Unending Story).

== Career ==
Mrunalini Bhosale received training in filmmaking at the Film and Television Institute of India, Pune. She also holds a degree in English Literature. She co-founded the agricultural commerce platform Agro India in 1995, and has organized several international farming seminars and exhibitions across India.

== Filmography ==
Mrunalini has directed and produced 50 documentaries in Marathi, Gujarati, Hindi and English. She received two National Film Awards from the President of India for her film Jaivik Kheti (Organic Farming) - Best Agricultural Film (India) and Best Direction. Her film Kapus Kondyachi Goshta (2014) also garnered several international awards:

- International Indian Film Festival of Queensland in Brisbane 2014 – Best Feature Film
- Sahyadri Cine Awards 2014 - Best Feature Film
- Maharashtra State Film Awards - Best Actress (Samidha Guru)
