= Fruean =

Fruean is a Samoan surname that may refer to the following people:

- Brianna Fruean (born 1998), activist and environmental advocate for Samoa
- Robbie Fruean (born 1988), New Zealand rugby union footballer
- Sandra Fruean (born 1968), American Samoan football official and former footballer
- Tuaolo Manaia Fruean (born 1945), American Samoan politician, judge, and civil servant
