= Ramchandra Martand Hajarnavis =

Indian politician (1908–1976)

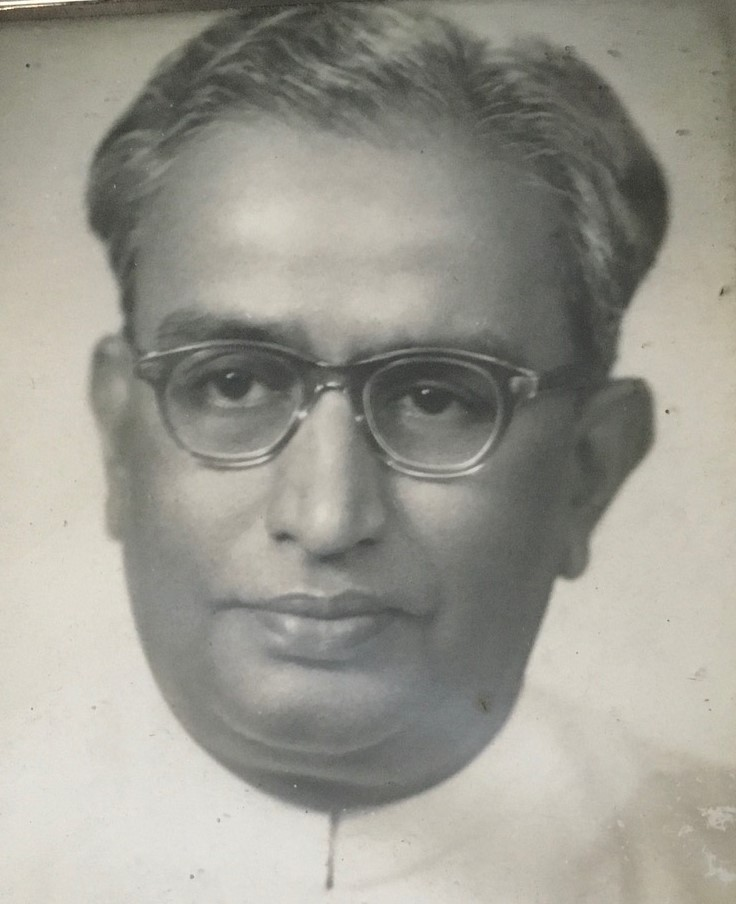
- Ramchandra Martand Hajarnavis

Deputy Minister of Law
- In office 5 January 1958 – 3 May 1962
- Prime Minister: Jawaharlal Nehru

Deputy Minister of Mines and Fuel
- In office 4 May 1962 – 22 February 1963
- Prime Minister: Jawaharlal Nehru

Minister of State in the Ministry of Home Affairs
- In office 23 February 1963 – 9 March 1964
- Prime Minister: Jawaharlal Nehru

Minister of Supply
- In office 10 March 1964 – 27 May 1964
- Prime Minister: Gulzarilal Nanda (interim); Lal Bahadur Shastri

Minister of Culture Affairs in the Ministry of Education
- In office June 1964 – 29 October 1965
- Prime Minister: Lal Bahadur Shastri

Minister of Law of Social Security in the Ministry of Law
- In office 30 October 1965 – 24 January 1966
- Prime Minister: Lal Bahadur Shastri; Gulzarilal Nanda (interim)

Member of the Indian Parliament for Bhandara
- In office 5 April 1957 – 3 March 1967
- Preceded by: Ansuyabai Borkar
- Succeeded by: A R Mehata

Member of the Indian Parliament for Chimur
- In office 4 March 1967 – 27 December 1970
- Preceded by: None
- Succeeded by: Krishnarao Dagoji Thakur

Personal details
- Born: 24 February 1908 Junnar, Poona District, Bombay Presidency, British India
- Died: 27 December 1976 (aged 68) Nagpur, Maharashtra, India
- Party: Indian National Congress
- Spouse: Usha Hajarnavis (m. 22 March 1941)
- Children: Charudatta Ramchandra Hajarnavis (Son); Prakash Ramchandra Hajarnavis (Son)
- Parent(s): Martand Sakharam Hajarnavis; Kamal Hajarnavis (Karkhanis)
- Education: Nagpur Law College

Ramchandra Martand Hajarnavis (24 February 1908 – 27 December 1976) was an Indian lawyer and politician.

== Early life ==
He studied at Morris College and Law College Nagpur and practiced at Bar. He was President of Bidi Kamgar Sangh during 1941–44.

== Political career ==
Hajarnavis started his political career as a councillor in the Corporation of the City of Nagpur in 1955. In 1957 he turned his attention to the national stage and was elected to the Second Lok Sabha as the member for Bhandara (Lok Sabha constituency). He was re-elected to the 3rd Lok Sabha from Bhandara in 1962. With the split of the Bhandara constituency prior to the 1962 election, he stood for election from Chimur (Lok Sabha constituency) and continued as a member of the 4th Lok Sabha.

He served in various roles in the 4th Nehru Ministry, the Shastri Ministry and in both Nanda Ministries.

He retired from politics prior to the 1971 Lok Sabha election and returned to working as an advocate.

== Personal life ==
He married Usha (Kamal Gupte) in 1941 and had 2 sons. He is the father of mathematician Professor Charudatta Ramchandra Hajarnavis and a cousin of astrophysicist Professor Shashikumar Chitre.

== Publication ==
The law of agricultural tenancy and village service lands in the Central provinces (a commentary on the C.P. Tenancy act, Act 1 of 1920), Nagpur, B.G. Gargay [1948].
