= Gallit Gondhal, Dillit Mujra =

- DVD cover
- Directed by: Nagesh Bhonsle
- Screenplay by: Arvind Jagtap
- Story by: Arvind Jagtap
- Produced by: Sayaji Shinde; Makarand Anaspure; Nagesh Bhonsle; Suresh Suvarna; Laxmikant Khabia
- Starring: Sayaji Shinde; Makarand Anaspure; Nagesh Bhosale
- Cinematography: Suresh Suvarna
- Edited by: Raj Surve
- Music by: Shailendra Barve
- Production company: Manohar Entertainment
- Release date: 1 May 2009
- Running time: 115 minutes
- Country: India
- Language: Marathi

Gallit Gondhal, Dillit Mujra is a 2009 Indian Marathi-language social comedy drama film directed by Nagesh Bhonsle, produced by Manohar Entertainment, story and screenplay is by Arvind Jagtap. The film stars Sayaji Shinde, Makarand Anaspure, Nagesh Bhonsle, Jyoti Joshi and Dr Sudhir Nikam

== Cast ==
- Sayaji Shinde
- Makarand Anaspure
- Nagesh Bhonsle
- Jyoti Joshi
- Suzanne Bernert
- Suhas Paranjape
- Nutan Jayant
- Dilip Ghare
- Sudhir Nikam
- Siddheshwar Zadbuke
- Leela Gokhale
- Ramchandra Dhumal
- Sachin Shinde

== Release ==
=== Theatrical ===
The film was theatrically released on 1 May 2009.

=== Home media ===
The film is originally available for streaming on ZEE5.

== Sequel ==
Punha Gondhal Punha Mujra is a second installment of franchise.
