= Babanchi Shala =

2016 Indian Marathi-language film

- Directed by: R. Viraj
- Written by: Neela Satyanarayan
- Starring: Sayaji Shinde; Aishwarya Narkar; Shashank Shende; Kamlesh Sawant; Chhaya Kadam
- Cinematography: Ankush Birajdar
- Edited by: Nilesh Gawande
- Music by: Soham Pathak
- Release date: 26 February 2016
- Country: India
- Language: Marathi

Babanchi Shala is a 2016 Indian Marathi-language film directed by R. Viraj. Produced by Vilas Mane and Umesh Nathani, the film stars Sayaji Shinde, Aishwarya Narkar, Shashank Shende, Kamlesh Sawant and Chhaya Kadam. Soham Pathak composed the music with cinematography by Ankush Birajdar. It was released theatrically on 26 February 2016 and television premier on 5 February 2017 on Star Pravah.

== Synopsis ==
A strict prison warden's heart is softened after he encounters personal problems and meets a criminal, Mahipat, who is a good man who killed his wife. He decides to help rehabilitate select prisoners.

== Cast ==
- Sayaji Shinde
- Aishwarya Narkar
- Shashank Shende
- Kamlesh Sawant
- Chhaya Kadam
- Arti More
- Umesh Bolake
- Milind Adhikari
- Kartik Chavan
- Manjula Khetri
- Kavita Chavan
- Shreyas Raje

== Production ==
Muhurat shot and formal launch was done on 20 July 2012 in Ajivasan studio at Mumbai.

== Reception ==
=== Critical response ===
Mihir Bhanage of The Times of India Wrote "Shende and Shinde have performed well but for a film to sustain only on the basis of a couple of performances is not possible". Ganesh Matkari of Pune Mirror says "The bottom line is that Babanchi Shala scores on the good intention but struggles to make a passing grade". Saumitra Pote from Maharashtra Times wrote "In the advertisement of this movie, V. Shantaram's 'Do Ankhe Barah Haath' is referred to. Both these films have similarities only in terms of story. Otherwise, comparing the two is sheer madness".
