= Goshta Choti Dongraevadhi =

- Poster
- Directed by: Nagesh Bhosale
- Written by: Sham Petkar; Arvind Jagtap
- Produced by: Makarand Anaspure; Sayaji Shinde; Nagesh Bhosale; Suresh Suvarna
- Starring: Makarand Anaspure; Sayaji Shinde; Nagesh Bhosale; Girija Oak; Madhu Kambikar; Madhavi Juvekar; Nilu Phule
- Cinematography: Suresh Suvarna
- Music by: Shailendra Barve
- Release date: 14 April 2009
- Country: India
- Language: Marathi

Goshta Choti Dongraevadhi is a Marathi film, released on 14 April 2009. The film, produced by Makarand Anaspure, Sayaji Shinde, and Suresh Suvarna, is directed by Nagesh Bhonsle. The film starring Makarand Anaspure, Sayaji Shinde, Nagesh Bhosale and Girija Oak tells the story of poor farmers and how they are being wronged by society and government. Nana Patekar lent his voice to narrate few lines at the end of this film. Nilu Phule made a special appearance and it was his last film as he died in April 2009.

== Plot ==
The film focuses on the plight of farmers in Maharashtra's drought hit region. Nandu is a heavily indebted farmer. Rajaram, Nandu's best friend, comes to village to earn bread and butter. Rajaram, a graduate in agriculture science, feels disappointed as he did not find good job in city. He wants to make some money by selling land but his mother prevents him from doing this and the story continues.

== Cast ==
- Nagesh Bhosale as Nandu
- Makarand Anaspure as Rajaram
- Nilu Phule....Special Appearance
- Girija Oak as Vaidehi
- Sayaji Shinde as Agriculture Minister
- Madhu Kambikar As Rajaram's mother
- Madhavi Juvekar As Nandu's wife

== Production ==
Sayaji Shinde, Makarand Anaspure and Cinematographer Suresh Suvarna Director Nagesh Bhosale came together to start their own production house. This was the first film of the production house.
