= Chunnilal Thakur =

Indian politician

Member of Parliament, Lok Sabha
- In office 1999–2004
- Preceded by: Praful Patel
- Succeeded by: Shishupal Patle
- Constituency: Bhandara

Member of Maharashtra Legislative Assembly
- In office 1990–1995
- Preceded by: Khushal Bopche
- Succeeded by: Khushal Bopche
- Constituency: Goregaon, Bhandara

Personal details
- Born: 25 March 1947 (age 79) Satwa, Bhandara district
- Party: Bharatiya Janata Party
- Spouse: Gitabai (m. 1975)
- Children: 1 son, 1 daughter
- Parents: Gopal Thakur (father); Dwarkabai Thakur (mother)

Chunnilal Thakur was a member of the 13th Lok Sabha of India. He represented the Bhandara constituency of Maharashtra and was a member of the Bharatiya Janata Party.
