= Aishwarya Narkar =

Indian actress (born 1970)

- Born: Pallavi Athale; 8 December 1970 (age 55); Mumbai, Maharashtra, India
- Occupation: Actress
- Years active: 1997–present
- Spouse: Avinash Narkar (m. 1995)

Aishwarya Narkar (born 8 December 1970) is an Indian actress who has appeared in Marathi films, serials and plays and has also appeared in numerous Hindi serials. She has also appeared in commercials. She is recipient of a National Film Award, three Maharashtra State Film Awards and also nominated for Filmfare Award for Best Actress – Marathi.

== Early life ==
Aishwarya was born as Pallavi Athale on 8 December 1970 in Mumbai, Maharashtra. She was raised in a middle-class family and spent her early years living in a chawl, an experience she has credited with shaping her outlook on life and helping her remain grounded despite her later success in the entertainment industry.

Her father was employed with the Reserve Bank of India, while her mother was a homemaker. Narkar excelled academically during her school years and was known to be a diligent student. Alongside her studies, she developed an interest in cultural activities and performing arts from a young age, which eventually led her towards a career in acting.

== Filmography ==
=== Television ===
Year	Show	Role	Channel	Ref.
1997-2000	Mahashweta	Radha	DD Sahyadri	
1999	Tharar	Episodic role	Alpha TV Marathi	
2000	Duheri	Radhika	Alpha TV Marathi	
2001	Thorala Ho	Rama	DD Sahyadri	
2002	Reshimgathi	Aishwarya	Alpha TV Marathi	
2002	Sonpawale	Episodic role	DD Sahyadri	
2005-2008	Ya Sukhanno Ya	Sarita Adhikari	Zee Marathi	
2006-2009	Ghar Ki Lakshmi Betiyann	Savitri Garodia	Zee TV	
2008	Unit 9	Episodic role	Zee Marathi	
2009	Chitrakathi	Ashwin's wife	DD Sahyadri	
2009-2010	Yeh Pyar Na Hoga Kam	Sudha Bajpayee	Colors TV	
2011-2012	Ya Valnavar	Rama	ETV Marathi	
2011	Maayke Se Bandhi Dor	Kaveri	StarPlus	
2012	Chhal — Sheh Aur Maat	Vasundhara Jaiswal ("Ija", or "Sarkar")	Colors TV	
2012	Ruchira	Guest appearance	DD Sahyadri	
2013-2015	Majhe Man Tujhe Zale	Shubhra's mother	ETV Marathi	
2015	Tum Hi Ho Bandhu Sakha Tumhi	Elaichi Trilokchand Pethawala	Zee TV	
2016-2018	Lek Majhi Ladki	Prof. Iravati Subhedar	Star Pravah	
2019-2020	Swamini	Gopikabai	Colors Marathi	
2021-2022	Kashibai Bajirao Ballal	Radha Balaji Bhatt	Zee TV	
2020-2021	Shreemantagharchi Suun	Aruna	Sony Marathi	
2022–2024	Satvya Mulichi Satavi Mulgi	Rupali Mhatre / Maithili Sengupta	Zee Marathi	
2023	Taali	Gauri's mother	JioCinema	
2023	Baatein Kuch Ankahee Si	Vani Malhotra	Star Plus	
2026	Amchya Ladkya Naik Bai	Sharada	Star Pravah	

=== Feature films ===
Year	Title	Role	Notes
1998	Aali Laxmi Ghara	Laxmi	
1999	Ghe Bharari	Mukta Deshmukh	
2000	Tuch Majhi Bhagya Lakshmi	Swati	
2000	Sattadhish	Vijaya Raje	
2000	Aai Shakti Devta	Bhagwati	
2001	Lakshmi	Lakshmi	
2001	Saubhagya Kankshini	Shakuntala	
2002	Aadhar	Janaki	
2003	Mala Jagaychay	Anita	
2004	Ghar Grihasti	Janaki Deshmukh	
2004	Sakshatkar	Sarita Pradhan	
2004	Ranragini	Ashwini Birajdar	
2004	Bhiti Ek Satya	Pallavi	
2004	Raja Pandharicha	Dnyaneshwar's mother	
2004	Akalpit	Latika	
2004	Salam The Salute	Chintoo's mother	
2004	Bhiu Nakos Mi Tujhya Pathishi Ahe	Bai	
2005	Olakh	Aishwarya	
2005	Sun Ladaki Sasarchi	Maya	
2005	Zhuluk	Aru	
2005	Me Tulas Tujhya Angani	Shanta	
2005	Kalam 302	Aishwarya	
2005	Tighi	Pallu	
2006	Jai Jai Gagangiri Maharaj	Alka	
2006	Kadhi Achanak	Kavita Doiphode	
2007	Ek Kalokhi Raatra	Mandakini	
2008	Mural Khandobarayachi	Murali	
2008	Apradh	Priya	
2010	Anka Ganit Anandache	Anand's mother	
2011	Tambavyacha Vishnubala	Vishnubala's wife	
2011	Aanandache Dohi	Anandi	
2012	Champions	Teacher	
2012	Hou De Zara Ushir	Rukmini Pawar	
2014	Yellow	Gauri's teacher	
2016	Babanchi Shala	Jailer's wife	
2018	Dhadak	Gayatri Bhagla	Hindi film
2023	Shehzada	Mrs. Upadhyay	Hindi film

=== Stage ===
Play	Language	Ref.
Gandh Nishigandhacha	Marathi	
Mi Majhya Mulancha	Marathi	
Satalota	Marathi	
Kabirache Kay Karayche	Marathi	
Lagnachi Bed	Marathi	
Hands Up	Marathi	
Pahat Wara	Marathi	
Sonpankhi	Marathi	
Sobat Sangat	Marathi	
Amhi Sau Kumud Prabhakar Apte	Marathi	
Soyre Sakal	Marathi	
Takshakyag	Marathi	

=== Television commercials ===
- 2000:Appeared in Fair & Lovelycream along with Trisha

== Awards ==
- Zee Chitra Gaurav Puraskar for Best Actress For Film Olakh
- Maharashtra State Film Award for Best Actress For Film Ghe Bharari
- Filmfare Award for Best Actress – Marathi Nominated For Film Ghe Bharari
