= The Maharashtra Files =

2026 Indian Marathi film

- Directed by: Sanjivkumar Rathod
- Written by: Sanjivkumar Rathod
- Produced by: Sanjivkumar Rathod; Shalini Rathod
- Starring: Usha Nadkarni; Mangesh Desai
- Cinematography: Tanveer Mir; Nagaraj Diwakar
- Edited by: Sanjay Shrirang Ingle
- Music by: Music: See below Background Score: Mangesh Dhakde
- Production company: Jai Jagdamba Productions
- Distributed by: AA Films
- Release date: 12 June 2026
- Country: India
- Language: Marathi

The Maharashtra Files is a 2026 Indian Marathi-language social drama film written and directed by Sanjivkumar Rathod, who also produced it alongside Shalini Rathod under the banner of Jai Jagdamba Productions. The film features Usha Nadkarni and Mangesh Desai in the lead roles, while Sayaji Shinde, Veena Jamkar, and Nagesh Bhonsle appear in pivotal roles. The story follows a woman from the Banjara community who battles bureaucratic corruption and a political nexus to secure fair compensation for land acquired by the government.

The film was originally scheduled to release on 29 May 2026, but its release was postponed to 12 June 2026.

== Cast ==
- Usha Nadkarni as Janabai Rathod
- Mangesh Desai as Raveer Deshmukh
- Veena Jamkar as Nayana Patil
- Sayaji Shinde as Patil
- Nagesh Bhonsle as Jay Patil
- Nitin Jadhav as Sachin
- Pranav Raorane as Pakya
- Suresh Pillai
- Aryan Rathod
- Krutika Tulaskar as Amruta Phadke
- Ravi Dhanve
- Jeevan Ade
- Sushil Rathod
- Sunil Godse as Vishwasrao Deshmukh
- Shamraj Patil as Collector
- Sunny Leone in a special appearance in the song "Shantabai"
- Sapna Choudhary in a special appearance in the song "Maar Tu Shikka"
- Gautami Patil in a special appearance in the song "Chhammo"
- Mangli in a special appearance in the song "Kati Tu Banjara"

== Soundtrack ==
The background score for The Maharashtra Files is composed by Mangesh Dhakde.

Track listing
No.	Title	Lyrics	Music	Singer(s)	Length
1.	"Maar Tu Shikka"	Sushil Rathod, Vinayak Pawar, Deepak Angewar, Nitin Sawant	Ambresh–Nitin	Anand Shinde, Vaishali Mhade, Ambresh Shroff	3:49
2.	"Kati Tu Banjara"	Dr. Geetkumar Pawar	Dr. Geetkumar Pawar	Raja Hasan, Mangli, Shalini Rathod	5:05
3.	"Chhammo"	Shakeel Azmi	Siddharth Kasyap	Raja Hasan, Sakshi Holkar	4:16
4.	"Shantabai"				3:53
5.	"Man Pakharu"	Guru Thakur	Ajit–Nitin	Ajay Gogavale	3:20
Total length:					20:23

== Release ==
The trailer of The Maharashtra Files was released on 18 May 2026. The film's music launch took place in early May 2026 in the presence of the cast and crew, including Sapna Chaudhary and Gautami Patil. The film is scheduled for a theatrical release on 29 May 2026. However, the release has now been postponed due to a delay in receiving certification from the censor board. Reports state that the Central Board of Film Certification suggested several cuts and modifications to the film before granting clearance, leading the makers to defer the release. The new release date was 12 June 2026.
