= Aani Baani =

- Theatrical release poster
- Directed by: Dinesh Jagtap
- Written by: Arvind Jagtap
- Starring: Upendra Limaye; Sayaji Shinde; Pravin Tarde; Sanjay Khapre
- Cinematography: Mangesh Gadekar
- Edited by: Pramod Kahar
- Music by: Devdatta Manisha Baji; Aadi Ramchandra; Pankaj Padghan
- Production company: Dinisha Films
- Distributed by: AA Films
- Release date: 28 July 2023
- Country: India
- Language: Marathi
- Budget: est.₹3.5 crore

Aani Baani (Note: Aani Baani is a term used in Indian state of Maharashtra to describe the Emergency of 1975.) is a 2023 Indian Marathi-language comedy drama film directed by Dinesh Jagtap in his Directorial Debut, written by Arvind Jagtap and produced by Dinisha Films. It is based on the Emergency of 1975 in India. The film stars Upendra Limaye, Sayaji Shinde, Pravin Tarde, Sanjay Khapre, Veena Jamkar.

== Cast ==
- Upendra Limaye
- Pravin Tarde
- Sayaji Shinde
- Sanjay Khapre
- Veena Jamkar as Vimal
- Usha Naik
- Prajakta Hanamghar
- Seema Kulkarni
- Rohit Kokate
- Sunil Abhyankar
- Padmanabh Bind
- Kishore Nandlaskar

== Release ==
The film was released theatrically across Maharashtra on 28 July 2023.

== Soundtrack ==
Track listing
No.	Title	Lyrics	Music	Singer (s)	Length
1.	"Gondhala Ye"	Valay Mulgund	Devdatta Manisha Baji	Adarsh Shinde, Ganesh Chandanshive, Haridas Shinde	4:56
2.	"Bai Ha Vishay Kathin"	Prasanna Deshmukh, Dinesh Jagtap	Aadi Ramchandra	Avdhoot Gupte	3:48
3.	"Aas Lagali"	Valay Mulgund	Pankaj Padghan	Hariharan, Sayali Pankajj	4:16

== Reception ==
=== Critical reception ===
A reviewer from Maharashtra Times rated two out of five stars and wrote "Although the movie is watchable once, it does not show much directorial skill. The screenplay does not seem to have been worked on seriously. As a result the cinema does not have a cohesive effect."

A reviewer from Times Now wrote "With a strong cast coupled with a content-rich plot, creative direction and a strong cast at the Marathi box office, Aani baani is definitely a one-time watch."
