= Goregaon, Gondia Assembly constituency =

Legislative assembly constituency of Maharashtra, India

Coordinates: 21.35°N 80.21°E

Goregaon-Vidarbha
- Former constituency for the Maharashtra Legislative Assembly

Constituency details
- Country: India
- Region: Western India
- State: Maharashtra
- District: Gondia
- Established: 1952
- Abolished: 2008

Goregaon Vidhan Sabha seat was one of the constituencies of Maharashtra Vidhan Sabha, in India. Goregaon is a tehsil in Gondia district.

== Members of the Legislative Assembly ==
Election	Member	Party
1952	Pannalal Beharilal Dube	Indian National Congress
1957	Puranlal Dharmabhan Rahangdale	Praja Socialist Party
1962	Puranlal Dharmabhan Rahangdale	Praja Socialist Party
1967	Puranlal Dharmabhan Rahangdale	Indian National Congress
1972	R. Tulsiramji Harinkhede	Indian National Congress
1978	Girjashankarsingh Hemrajsingh Nagpure	Indian National Congress
1980	Girjashankarsingh Hemrajsingh Nagpure	Indian National Congress
1985	Khushal Bopche	Bharatiya Janata Party
1990	Chunnilalbhau Thakur	Bharatiya Janata Party
1995	Khushal Bopche	Indian National Congress
1999	Khomeshwar Natthulal Rahangadale	Bharatiya Janata Party
2004	Hemant (Tanubhau) Shrawan Patle	Bharatiya Janata Party

== Election results ==
=== Assembly Election 2004 ===
2004 Maharashtra Legislative Assembly election : Goregaon, Gondia
Party	Candidate	Votes	%	±%
BJP	Patle Hemant (Tanubhau) Shrawan	51,209	44.63%	▲4.97
INC	Baghele Dr. Zamsinghbhau Fagalalbhau	48,435	42.22%	▲4.55
BSP	Shrichand Nebhandas Rohala	9,543	8.32%	New
Independent	Shende Premlal Mansaram	2,323	2.02%	New
Margin of victory		2,774	2.42%	▲0.42
Turnout		114,731	76.02%	▲0.36
Total valid votes		114,729		
Registered electors		150,919		▲10.03
BJP hold		Swing	▲4.97	

=== Assembly Election 1999 ===
1999 Maharashtra Legislative Assembly election : Goregaon, Gondia
Party	Candidate	Votes	%	±%
BJP	Rahangadale Khomeshwar Natthulal	39,308	39.66%	▲3.06
INC	Baghele Dr. Zamsinghbhau Fagalalbhau	37,326	37.66%	▼3.93
NCP	Bopche Khushal Parasram	13,616	13.74%	New
Independent	Rane Vijay Yeshwantrao	8,004	8.08%	New
Margin of victory		1,982	2.00%	▼2.98
Turnout		103,785	75.67%	▼4.77
Total valid votes		99,100		
Registered electors		137,162		▼2.25
BJP gain from INC		Swing	▼1.93	

=== Assembly Election 1995 ===
1995 Maharashtra Legislative Assembly election : Goregaon, Gondia
Party	Candidate	Votes	%	±%
INC	Bopche Khushal Parasram	46,944	41.59%	▲11.86
BJP	Thakur Chunnilalbhau Gopal	41,318	36.61%	▼4.64
Independent	Funne Hemantkumar Asaram	8,074	7.15%	New
CPI	Rahangdale Hauslal Harichand	3,481	3.08%	New
Margin of victory		5,626	4.98%	▼6.53
Turnout		115,625	82.40%	▲12.36
Total valid votes		112,867		
Registered electors		140,318		▲3.59
INC gain from BJP		Swing	▲0.34	

=== Assembly Election 1990 ===
1990 Maharashtra Legislative Assembly election : Goregaon, Gondia
Party	Candidate	Votes	%	±%
BJP	Chunnilalbhau Gopalbhau Thakur	38,038	41.25%	▼11.08
INC	Katare Manojkumar Hemendranath	27,415	29.73%	▼16.26
BRP	Raut Gyaniram Maroti	8,350	9.05%	New
Independent	Kirsan Namdeo Dasram	7,069	7.67%	New
Independent	Nagpure Girjashankarsingh Hemrajsingh	5,800	6.29%	New
Margin of victory		10,623	11.52%	▲5.18
Turnout		93,479	69.01%	▼5.51
Total valid votes		92,217		
Registered electors		135,456		▲18.43
BJP hold		Swing	▼11.08	

=== Assembly Election 1985 ===
1985 Maharashtra Legislative Assembly election : Goregaon, Gondia
Party	Candidate	Votes	%	±%
BJP	Khushal Parasram Bopche	44,046	52.33%	▲10.33
INC	Patel Praful Manoharbhai	38,707	45.98%	New
Independent	Kothewar Sadashio Shivaram	591	0.70%	New
Margin of victory		5,339	6.34%	▲2.87
Turnout		85,253	74.54%	▲13.48
Total valid votes		84,175		
Registered electors		114,378		▲5.61
BJP gain from INC(I)		Swing	▲6.86	

=== Assembly Election 1980 ===
1980 Maharashtra Legislative Assembly election : Goregaon, Gondia
Party	Candidate	Votes	%	±%
INC(I)	Nagpure Girjashankarsingh Hemrajsingh	29,602	45.47%	▼9.12
BJP	Bopche Khushal Parasram	27,340	41.99%	New
RPI	Chandrikapure Laxman Gowardhan	5,724	8.79%	New
INC(U)	Doye Dilip Madhukarrao	2,442	3.75%	New
Margin of victory		2,262	3.47%	▼9.99
Turnout		66,432	61.34%	▼16.15
Total valid votes		65,108		
Registered electors		108,302		▲5.35
INC(I) hold		Swing	▼9.12	

=== Assembly Election 1978 ===
1978 Maharashtra Legislative Assembly election : Goregaon, Gondia
Party	Candidate	Votes	%	±%
INC(I)	Nagpure Girjashankarsingh Hemrajsingh	42,796	54.58%	New
JP	Puranlal Dharmabhan Rahangdale	32,240	41.12%	New
INC	Harinkhede Ramchandraji Tulshiramji	2,663	3.40%	▼44.57
Independent	Dongre Jaichand Prasad Adkuji	704	0.90%	New
Margin of victory		10,556	13.46%	▼4.09
Turnout		81,420	79.20%	▲19.80
Total valid votes		78,403		
Registered electors		102,804		▲6.27
INC(I) gain from INC		Swing	▲6.62	

=== Assembly Election 1972 ===
1972 Maharashtra Legislative Assembly election : Goregaon, Gondia
Party	Candidate	Votes	%	±%
INC	R. Tulsiramji Harinkhede	26,201	47.97%	▲7.92
RPI	Rajaram Ghusaji Dhamgaye	16,612	30.41%	▲11.46
ABJS	Ghansambhai Doye	11,807	21.62%	New
Margin of victory		9,589	17.56%	▲15.26
Turnout		56,674	58.58%	▼6.73
Total valid votes		54,620		
Registered electors		96,740		▲8.71
INC hold		Swing	▲7.92	

=== Assembly Election 1967 ===
1967 Maharashtra Legislative Assembly election : Goregaon, Gondia
Party	Candidate	Votes	%	±%
INC	Puranlal Dharmabhan Rahangdale	22,524	40.05%	▼0.15
Independent	S. B. Doye	21,233	37.76%	New
RPI	B. S. Bansod	10,659	18.95%	New
Independent	T. J. Mendhe	1,388	2.47%	New
Independent	L. B. Rahulikar	430	0.76%	New
Margin of victory		1,291	2.30%	▼8.13
Turnout		62,021	69.70%	▲11.77
Total valid votes		56,234		
Registered electors		88,988		▲20.21
INC gain from PSP		Swing	▼10.57	

=== Assembly Election 1962 ===
1962 Maharashtra Legislative Assembly election : Goregaon, Gondia
Party	Candidate	Votes	%	±%
PSP	Puranlal Dharmabhan Rahangdale	19,271	50.62%	▲17.76
INC	Pannalal Biharilal Dube	15,303	40.20%	▲9.68
Independent	Sivaji Dharma Shahare	1,463	3.84%	New
Independent	Dasaram Dama Raut	1,220	3.20%	New
Independent	Harbhau Domaji Harankhede	450	1.18%	New
Independent	Tulsiram Shioram Uaike	361	0.95%	New
Margin of victory		3,968	10.42%	▲8.07
Turnout		42,371	57.24%	▲4.42
Total valid votes		38,068		
Registered electors		74,026		▲5.04
PSP hold		Swing	▲17.76	

=== Assembly Election 1957 ===
1957 Bombay State Legislative Assembly election : Goregaon, Gondia
Party	Candidate	Votes	%	±%
PSP	Puranlal Dharmabhan Rahangdale	10,887	32.86%	New
INC	Katare Tejsingh Narayan	10,109	30.52%	▼12.17
SCF	Meshram Goma Urkuda (Sc)	8,446	25.50%	▲11.22
Independent	Pradhan Bakaram Jangli	3,685	11.12%	New
Margin of victory		778	2.35%	▼10.36
Turnout		33,127	47.01%	▼16.68
Total valid votes		33,127		
Registered electors		70,474		▲40.26
PSP gain from INC		Swing	▼9.82	

=== Assembly Election 1952 ===
1952 Madhya Pradesh Legislative Assembly election : Goregaon, Gondia
Party	Candidate	Votes	%	±%
INC	Pannalal Beharilal Dube	13,660	42.68%	New
Independent	P. D. Rahangdale	9,592	29.97%	New
SCF	Sitaram Jangli Dongare	4,568	14.27%	New
Independent	Bairagi Mahuru Patel	1,847	5.77%	New
Independent	Nathuji Ganpatiji	1,539	4.81%	New
Independent	Abhiman Sakharam Sahare	796	2.49%	New
Margin of victory		4,068	12.71%	
Turnout		32,002	63.69%	
Total valid votes		32,002		
Registered electors		50,247		
INC win (new seat)				
