= Gadhvacha Lagna =

- Theatrical release poster
- Directed by: Raju Phulkar
- Written by: Raju Phulkar (Screenplay and Dialogues)
- Story by: Haribhau Vadgaonkar
- Based on: Navnath Pothi – 24 chapter (traditionally)
- Produced by: S. B. Pardeshi
- Starring: Makarand Anaspure; Rajshree Landage; Sanjay Khapre; Sonalee Kulkarni; Sharad Ponkshe
- Cinematography: Suresh Deshmane
- Edited by: Shailendra Doke
- Music by: Music: Bal Palsule; Songs: Jagdish Khebudkar
- Production companies: S. B. Pardesi Productions; Sumeet Movies
- Release date: 1 January 2007
- Running time: 139 minutes
- Country: India
- Language: Marathi

Gadhvacha Lagna or Gadhvache Lagna (transl. Donkey's Marriage) is a 2007 Indian Marathi-language comedy film directed by Raju Phulkar and produced by S. B. Pardeshi under the banner of S. B. Pardeshi Productions. The film stars Makarand Anaspure, Rajshree Landge, Sanjay Khapre in leading roles.

The film was theatrically released on 1 January 2007.

== Plot ==
Savalya, a potter who worships his donkey, goes to heaven and has a unique experience. On his return, he realizes that everything around him has changed. Soon he and his donkey have a challenge.

== Cast ==
- Makarand Anaspure as Savlya Kumbhar
- Rajshree Landge as Gangu Kumbhar
- Sanjay Khapre as Sada/ Sadabai
- Sonalee Kulkarni as Rambha
- Sharad Ponkshe as Diwanji
- Kiran Ronge
- Siddeshwar Zadbuke as Pradhanji
- Dipak Alegaokar
- Mukund Phansalkar as Indradev
- Imtiaz Bagvan
- Anvay Bendre as Buva
- Gazhal Dabholkar
- Ranjeet Magdoom
- Nandu Pol as King Satya Verma
- Sumira Gujar as Rajkunvar
- Jyoti Joshi
- Nandini Jog
- Praksh Dhotre

== Crew ==
- Public relations official – P. K. Bone
- Marketing and publicity – Shrikant Dhondge, Sanket, and Shreyas
- Art and costume designer – Raju Phulkar
- Choreographer – Narendra Pandit
- Music cinematography – Raju Phulkar
- Production head – Hemant Gadekar
- Production manager – Hemant Giri
- Executive producer – Ravi Bartakke (Nashik)
- Executive advisor – Harshit Abhiraj
- Co-producer – Eknath Kudle
- Concept – S. B. Pardeshi (Subhash Pardeshi)

== Soundtrack ==
Gadhvacha Lagna

Soundtrack album by Jagdish Khebudkar
- Released: 2007
- Genre: Feature film soundtrack
- Length: 15:58
- Language: Marathi
- Label: Sumeet Music
- Producer: Jagdish Khebudkar

Jagdish Khebudkar chronology
Maherchi Maaya (2007)	Gadhvacha Lagna (2007)

Music is composed by Bal Palsule and Songs are composed by Jagdish Khebudkar.

All music is composed by Bal Palsule.

Track listing
No.	Title	Singer(s)	Length
1.	"Bhar Disa He Sapan Padla"	Anand Shinde; Shakuntala Jadhav	4:40
2.	"Mazi Rambha Ga"	Anand Shinde	3:53
3.	"Mi Chhattis Nakhrewali"	Vaishali Samant; Nitin Diskalkar	3:30
4.	"Indra Darbari Nache Sundari"	Sadhana Sargam	4:35
Total length:			15:58
