= Kapus Kondyachi Goshta =

- Film poster
- Directed by: Mrunalini Bhosale
- Written by: Prasad Namjoshi
- Produced by: Ravindra alias Nitin Bhosale
- Starring: Makarand Anaspure; Samidha Guru; Bharat Ganeshpure; Gauri Konge; Mohini Kulkarni; Netra Mali
- Cinematography: Wasim Maner
- Edited by: Santosh Gothoskar
- Production company: Wenkateshwara Films International
- Release dates: 2014 (Dadasaheb Film Festival); 1 April 2016 (India)
- Running time: 111 minutes
- Country: India
- Language: Marathi

Kapus Kondyachi Goshta is an Indian woman oriented as well as an agricultural related movie written by Prasad Namjoshi and directed by Mrunalini Bhosale. He is popular on television and has acted in several Marathi movies. It features Makarand Anaspure, Samidha Guru and Bharat Ganeshpure in the lead roles. Supporting roles are played by Gauri Konge, Mohini Kulkarni and Netra Mali. The film is produced by Ravindra alias Nitin Bhosale. The background score was composed by Shailesh Dani and the cinematography was handled by Wasim Maner.

The movie received a lot of awards and appreciations with the support of All Lights Film Services (ALFS), a leading Film Festival Consultancy.

== Cast ==
- Makarand Anaspure as Lawyer
- Samidha Guru as Jyoti
- Bharat Ganeshpure as Dada Patil
- Gauri Konge as Ratna
- Mohini Kulkarni as Chanda
- Netra Mali as Bali

== Festival screenings ==
The film was an official selection for the following film festivals:

- International Indian Film Festival of Queensland in Brisbane - International Competition section.
- Gwinnett Center International Film Festival, USA - International Competition section.
- 9th Seattle South Asian Film Festival, USA - International Competition section.
- Silk Road International Film Festival, China - International Competition section.

== Accolades ==
Maharashtra State Film Awards 2014

- 2014 : Best Actress Award - Samidha Guru
