= Guldasta (2011 film) =

2011 Marathi-language film

- Directed by: Hemant Deodhar
- Written by: Arvind Jagtap
- Produced by: Shivam Lonari
- Starring: Makarand Anaspure; Jitendra Joshi; Tejaswini Lonari
- Cinematography: Suresh Suvarna
- Edited by: Vijay Khochikar
- Music by: Tyagraj Khadilkar
- Distributed by: Zee Talkies
- Release date: 14 January 2011
- Running time: 116 minutes
- Country: India
- Language: Marathi
- Budget: 12.5 million, considered a large figure for a Marathi film.

Guldasta (Marathi: गुलदस्ता; English: Bouquet of Flowers) is a Marathi film released on 14 January 2011. It revolves around two friends, played by Makarand Anaspure and Jitendra Joshi and their hilarious attempt to find their individual love, which turns into an ultimate mess.
