= Naam Foundation =

Farmer-focused organization in India

- Formation: 15 September 2015
- Founder: Nana Patekar & Makarand Anaspure
- Purpose: Helping farmers and their families
- Headquarters: Pune, India
- Region served: Maharashtra, India
- Key people: Nana Patekar & Makarand Anaspure
- Website: naammh.org

Naam Foundation is a non-governmental organisation based in the city of Pune by Nana Patekar and Makarand Anaspure. The foundation works for betterment of farmers in the drought-prone areas of Marathwada and Vidarbha in the state of Maharashtra, India.

== Background and founding ==
Nana Patekar and Makarand Anaspure started with helping the families of farmers who had committed suicide in the year 2015. This help was at a personal level. Initially, around 230 families from the villages in the districts of Nanded, Parbhani, Hingoli were helped. The help package included a cheque of ₹ 15,000, blankets, clothes and medical kit. However, instead of helping a select few families and in order to increase the scope of this social work beyond monetary compensation, Nana Patekar and Makrand Anaspure decided to set up a foundation to undertake all these activities. They registered Naam Foundation in Pune in September 2015.

== Donations ==
Donations poured in to the foundation immediately after inauguration. The foundation collected ₹ 80 lacs on day 1. The foundation collected over ₹ 6.5 crores within two weeks. In order to facilitate the process, there is a bank account that has been opened with State Bank of India, wherein people who want to help can deposit money for the said cause. The donation process is easy requiring pan card only, there is a tax benefit for each donation made by an individual donor as per Mumbai Trust Act : 1950

== Work ==
The foundation helps the farmers in drought-stricken areas of Maharashtra. The help is monetary and in-kind. In addition to the monetary help, the foundation is working on planting 1 crore trees, training and guidance to the farmers, farming centres, employment centres, etc. The foundation has adopted Dhondalgaon (tal. Vaijapur, Aurangabad) and Aamala (Wardha) villages. The foundation aims to grant employment to 500 youngsters and 30 women. The foundation has offices in the cities of Mumbai, Thane, Pune, Aurangabad and Nagpur.

== Initiatives ==
1) Education

2) Endorsed Villages

3) Basic Help For Farmer's Widows

4) Group Farming

5) Sewing Cluster

6) River Rejuvenation

7) Constructions Of Houses
