= Shishupal Natthu Patle =

Indian politician

Member of Parliament, Lok Sabha
- In office 2004–2009
- Preceded by: Chunnilal Thakur
- Succeeded by: constituency abolished
- Constituency: Bhandara

Personal details
- Born: 1 February 1967 (age 58); Warpindkepar, Bhandara district, Maharashtra
- Political party: Indian National Congress (2024 – present); Bharatiya Janata Party (Till 2024)
- Spouse: Shilpa (m. 1998)
- Children: 2 sons
- Parents: Natthu Patle (father); Miran Bai Patle (mother)
- Education: Bachelor of Arts; Diploma in Education

Shishupal Natthu Patle (born 1 February 1967) is a member of the 14th Lok Sabha of India. He represents the Bhandara constituency of Maharashtra and is a member of the Bharatiya Janata Party (BJP) political party.
