= Vijay Bharatlal Rahangdale =

Indian politician

Member of the Maharashtra Legislative Assembly
- Incumbent
- Assumed office 2014
- Preceded by: Khushal Bopche
- Constituency: Tirora

Personal details
- Political party: Bharatiya Janata Party

Vijay Bharatlal Rahangdale is a member of the 13th Maharashtra Legislative Assembly. He represents the Tirora Assembly Constituency and belongs to the Bharatiya Janata Party. Rahangdale served as a member of Gondia Zilla Parishad in 2012, which he held the position of chairman of the Public Works Committee. He has also served as the president of the Zilla Parishad.

== Political career ==
Vijay is a member of the Rashtriya Swayamsevak Sangh (RSS), Since his Childhood a far-right Hindu nationalist paramilitary volunteer organisation.

== Controversy ==
Rahangdale was involved in an agitation against Chief Executive Officer of the Gondia Zilla Parishad, Yeshwant Gedam accusing him of corruption. The agitators declared that they would stall proceedings from 13 December 2012 unless Gedam was transferred after the intervention of the then state Chief Minister, Prithviraj Chavan. After he was transferred Gedam filed a case against Rahangdale and two others, accusing him of physical violence. A case was filed under the Scheduled Caste and Scheduled Tribe (Prevention of Atrocities) Act, 1989. Rahangdale was arrested on 16 December 2012 and later released on bail on 19 December 2012.
