= Kaydyacha Bola =

- Theatrical release poster
- Directed by: Chandrakant Kulkarni
- Written by: Chandrakant Kulkarni
- Produced by: Uday Tamhankar
- Starring: Makarand Anaspure; Sharvari Jamenis; Sachin Khedekar; Mohan Agashe; Umesh Kamat; Akshay Pendse; Nirmiti Sawant; Amita Khopkar
- Cinematography: Sameer Athalye
- Edited by: Jaffer Sultan
- Music by: Tyagraj Khadilkar
- Production company: Tamhankar Productions
- Release date: 4 November 2005
- Running time: 106 Minutes
- Country: India
- Language: Marathi

Kaydyacha Bola (Speak About Law) is a 2005 Indian Marathi-language dark comedy courtroom drama film directed by Chandrakant Kulkarni and produced by Uday Tamhankar. Released in Maharashtra on 4 November 2005 and adapted from Jonathan Lynn's My Cousin Vinny (1992), the film stars an ensemble cast of Makarand Anaspure, Sharvari Jamenis, Sachin Khedekar, Mohan Agashe, Umesh Kamat, Akshay Pendse, Nirmiti Sawant and Amita Khopkar.

== Plot ==
Two engineering college students, Abhijeet Vaidya (Umesh Kamat) and Harshavardhan Ghodke (Akshay Pendse), lie to their respective parents and plan to take a trip to Mumbai from Harshavardhan's relatives' red-coloured Scorpio car registered with the number "3417". After reaching their destination the next morning, the duo stops at a petrol pump in Chembur on the Mumbai-Pune Highway. While there, Abhijeet and Harshavardhan get their car tyres filled with air by a South Indian mechanic, Prabhudeva (Samir Choughule), also known as Tambi, and also jokingly converse with a dance artist, Nrutyachandrika Saraswatibai Jagaonkar (Nirmiti Sawant), whose dance troupe has stopped at the petrol pump as well for their bus repair work. While Harshavardhan is getting petrol filled in their car by the petrol pump employee, Pandurang Raoji Kute, Abhijeet decides to go to purchase snacks from a store located in the vicinity. He wakes up the irritated store owner, Sawant (Girish Joshi), from his sleep, and manages to persuade him to let him purchase snacks from his store. While shopping, Abhijeet quickly shoplifts a CD to teach Sawant a lesson for his rude behaviour. Abhijeet and Harshavardhan depart the petrol pump.

Soon after, Abhijeet and Harshavardhan are apprehended by the Mumbai police at a nearby random checkpoint for unknown reasons. They initially believe that they have been arrested for shoplifting the CD from Sawant's store, and confess their crime to the investigating police officer, Inspector P. J. Ambildhake (Ganesh Yadav). After being taken to the police station, however, the duo is shocked to learn that Pandurang was robbed and stabbed fatally with a gupti (an Indian weapon which resembles a swordstick) inside the petrol pump premises, and that they have been charged with the crime due to circumstantial evidence, and the confession to the shoplifting being misunderstood for one to the stabbing. Being stranded in a strange city with no contacts, Abhijeet helplessly calls his ingenuous mother, Shaku (Amita Khopkar), from the police station in his village to explain their position and requests her to somehow free them from this matter. Shaku informs Abhijeet that his village-based maternal uncle, Advocate Keshav Kunthalgirikar (Makarand Anaspure), is a lawyer of dubious credentials in their family. Keshav, who has been communicated by Shaku, arrives in Mumbai and visits Abhijeet and Harshavardhan in prison, advising them to be truthful about their involvement in the murder.

Being totally new to the practice of law, Keshav embarrasses himself before the prosecution counsel, Advocate Phadnavis (Sachin Khedekar), and Judge Prabhune (Mohan Agashe) in the first hearing of the trial. Due to his disrespect and failure to follow courtroom decorum, Prabhune punishes him for contempt of court and sentences Keshav to imprisonment for two days. In prison, Keshav meets a serial gambler, Bhai (Sanjay Mone), and his gang, who all bully and make fun of Keshav. However, Keshav's girlfriend, Neha (Sharvari Jamenis), arrives to visit him in Mumbai and bails him out from prison. After a lot of deliberation, the couple checks into a hotel room, where Neha is shown to be romantic and Keshav shy. In the next hearing, Keshav argues that the only evidence against Abhijeet and Harshavardhan is circumstantial, which Phadnavis counters by stating that the available evidence is strong enough to convict them. Later, it is shown that Harshavardhan's father, Suryakant Ghodke (Arun Nalawade), who is a respected politician contesting in the elections in India, learns about his and Abhijeet's arrest and decides to arrange for a more experienced lawyer rather than the raw and inexperienced Keshav. He arranges for Advocate G. B. Godbole (Pushkar Shrotri), but he stammers constantly and has great difficulty in forming cohesive sentences, leading to a lot of amusement in the court. Suryakant is, however, tremendously impressed with Keshav's advocacy skills and decides to retain him, while Godbole is fired by Harshavardhan.

In the following hearing, the prosecution examines Saraswatibai and Tambi as they both were the witnesses at the petrol pump when the murder occurred. However, Keshav's cross-examination with them establishes that the possibility of another red-coloured Scorpio car being present at the petrol pump during the time of the murder cannot be ruled out, thus creating reasonable doubt. Further, the prosecution examines Sawant, who is still furious about the fact that Abhijeet disturbed his sleep, and vociferously states that the murderer could not have been anyone else, but the accused Abhijeet and Harshavardhan. Keshav cross-examines Sawant and exploits gaps in his testimony, establishing that his attention was diverted from the petrol pump around the time of the murder, and thus he could have not stated with absolute certainty that no one else rather than Abhijeet and Harshavardhan is the murderer. In the next hearing, the prosecution also examines Inspector Ambildhake, where Keshav even discusses the probability of the police manipulating evidence to trap Abhijeet and Harshavardhan, which further weakens the prosecution case.

At the end of the hearing, Phadnavis, seemingly impressed with the novice Keshav's advocacy skills, invites him to his farmhouse for a drink that night. During their meeting, Phadnavis carefully teases Keshav around his law school days, his graduation, and his initial days as a lawyer, which Keshav hesitantly answers, and then gets into a debate with Phadnavis about how law and advocacy is more important than just earning money and manipulating the legal system to win cases. Phadnavis is furious with this argument for having a record of not losing a single case, and swears that he will destroy Keshav's case in the next hearing. In the final hearing, Keshav concludes his arguments and has seemingly succeeded in convincing Prabhune of Abhijeet and Harshavardhan's innocence. However, Phadnavis twists the tale and asks for Prabhune's permission to examine "Keshav" as a witness, much to everyone's puzzlement. Phadnavis asks Keshav under oath about his shaky professional history and eventually, it is revealed that Keshav never obtained a license to practice law. On this ground, Phadnavis applies for a new trial of the case in front of Prabhune with a qualified lawyer to represent Abhijeet and Harshavardhan. Keshav admits his mistake and then makes an emotional speech about how the law was meant to uphold justice and serve the needy and instead, laments that it has become a tool for people like Phadnavis to exploit technical loopholes in the procedure to strongarm cases in their favour, at the expense of the poor and needy who end up with nothing in their hands.

As regards the case, Keshav creates more reasonable doubt by explaining that the angle of the injuries discovered on Pandurang's dead body strongly indicates that the murderer should have been a left-hander, and points out that both Abhijeet and Harshavardhan are right-handers. Acting upon Saraswatibai's information, the police succeed in investigating that a group of criminals with a red-coloured Scorpio car in Pune were recently arrested for a bank robbery, and that they are presumably the culprits of Pandurang's murder as well. Prabhune, on the basis of reasonable doubt, announces a verdict of not guilty to Abhijeet and Harshavardhan, much to the relief of them and Keshav. However, given that Keshav has committed a crime by practicing law without a license, Prabhune orders a trial against him for cheating and contempt of court under Section 420 of the Indian Penal Code. In the end, Abhijeet and Harshavardhan profusely express gratitude to Keshav for his help and apologise to him for what everything cost him. Before his arrest, Keshav promises Neha that he will be united with her forever after his release from prison. The film ends with everyone celebrating Keshav's victory as he is taken to the police station from a decorated police van.

== Cast ==
- Makarand Anaspure as Advocate Keshav Kunthalgirikar
- Sharvari Jamenis as Neha
- Sachin Khedekar as Advocate Phadnavis: public prosecutor
- Mohan Agashe as Judge Prabhune
- Umesh Kamat as Abhijeet Vaidya
- Akshay Pendse as Harshavardhan Ghodke
- Nirmiti Sawant as Saraswatibai Jagaonkar: dance artist
- Amita Khopkar as Shaku Vaidya: Abhijeet's mother
- Arun Nalawade as Suryakant Ghodke (Annasaheb): Harshavardhan's father
- Pushkar Shrotri as Advocate G. B. Godbole: Suryakant's lawyer
- Sanjay Mone as Bhai: serial gambler
- Samir Choughule as Prabhudeva (Tambi): petrol pump mechanic
- Girish Joshi as Sawant: store owner
- Ganesh Yadav as Inspector P. J. Ambildhake: investigating police officer

== Soundtrack ==
The music is provided by Tyagraj Khadilkar.

== Accolades ==
- Maharashtra State Film Award for Best Second Film in 2006.
- Maharashtra State Film Award for Best Comedian - Makarand Anaspure in 2006.
- Maharashtra State Film Award (Special Jury Award) - Sharvari Jamenis.
