= Khushal Bopche =

Indian politician

Member of Maharashtra Legislative Assembly
- In office 2009–2014
- Preceded by: Dilip Bansod
- Succeeded by: Vijay Rahangdale
- Constituency: Tirora
- In office 1995–1999
- Preceded by: Chunnilal Thakur
- Succeeded by: Khomeshwar Rahangdale
- Constituency: Goregaon, Bhandara
- In office 1985–1989
- Preceded by: Girijashankar Singh Nagpure
- Succeeded by: Chunnilal Thakur
- Constituency: Goregaon, Bhandara

Member of Parliament, Lok Sabha
- In office 1989–1991
- Preceded by: Keshavrao Pardhi
- Succeeded by: Praful Patel
- Constituency: Bhandara

Personal details
- Born: 16 August 1951 (age 75) Hirdamali, Bhandara district
- Party: Bharatiya Janata Party
- Other political affiliations: Indian National Congress
- Spouse: Sushila Bopche (m. 1972)
- Children: 2 sons, 3 daughters
- Parent: Parasram Bopche (father)
- Education: Diploma in Homeopathy medicine & Biochemistry
- Profession: Medical Practitioner, Politician

Khushal Bopche (born 16 August 1951) is an Indian politician from the Bhartiya Janta Party.

== Political career ==
Khushal Bopche is a member of the Rashtriya Swayamsevak Sangh (RSS), a far-right Hindu nationalist paramilitary volunteer organisation.

- 1976-1981 He started his political career as vice Sarpanch at Gram panchayat Hirdamali.
- 1980-1985 he was Member of Panchayat Simiti Goregaon .
- 1981-1985 He was President of Bhartiya Janta Yuva morcha Bhandara District.
- 1985-1989 He was MLA from Goregaon in Maharashtra Assembly.
- 1985-1990 He was President of Bhartiya Janta Yuva morcha Maharashtra Pradesh .
- 1989-1991 He was also Member of Parliament representing Bhandara (Lok Sabha constituency) in 9th Loksabha .
- 1995-1999 He was Member of legislative Assembly from Goregaon.
- 1997-1998 he was chairman of Public accounts Committee .
- 2003 he was chairman of water conservation advisory council .
- He was a member of the Maharashtra Legislative Assembly, representing, Tirora. He defeated Rahangdale Sushilkumar Sukhadev of NCP by 623 votes in the 2009 elections.

Personal life

He was born and stays at Hiradamali, Goregaon in Gondia district. He is Homoeopathic medicine practitioner and agriculturist by profession. He is married to Mrs Sushila and has two sons and three daughters.
