= Punha Gondhal Punha Mujra =

Punha Gondhal Punha Mujara
- Theatrical release poster
- Directed by: Balkrishna Shinde
- Written by: Arvind Jagtap
- Produced by: Navin Singh; Rakesh Bhosle
- Starring: Makarand Anaspure; Sayaji Shinde; Alok Nath; Ashish Vidyarthi; Maledina Alexandra; Rasika Vaze; Pornima Ahire kende Vilas Ujawane; Swapnil Rajshekhar; Siddheshwar Zadbuke; Vinti Bhonde
- Cinematography: Suresh Suvarna
- Music by: Shashank Powar; Sandeep Jamdar
- Distributed by: Siddhivinayak International Films
- Release date: 10 October 2014
- Country: India
- Language: Marathi

Punha Gondhal Punha Mujara (Marathi: पुन्हा गोंधळ पुन्हा मुजरा) is a 2014 Marathi political comedy film directed by Balkrishna Shinde, starring Makarand Anaspure and Sayaji Shinde. The film is a sequel of 2009 Gallit Gondhal, Dillit Mujra and marked the debut of Bollywood actors Alok Nath and Ashish Vidyarthi in Marathi cinema.

== Plot ==
The story of this film revolves around two politicians from the same village. One of them is an elected MLA from Village constituency Narayan Wagh and the other being his opponent Vishwasrao Tope, who has lost the election to Mr. Wagh by a narrow margin. But, Vishwasrao manages to get this nomination as MLC. So, to prove their supremacy, they indulge themselves in dirty politics, so as to turn the tables on each other. And, this clearly goes on to show how murky the politics is at the village level.

== Cast ==
- Makarand Anaspure as Narayan Wagh
- Sayaji Shinde as Vishwasrao Tope
- Ashish Vidyarthi
- Alok Nath
- Maledina Alexandra
- Rasika Vaze
- Pornima Ahire kende
- Vilas Ujawane
- Swapnil Rajshekhar
- Siddheshwar Zadbuke
- Vinti Bhonde

== Release ==
The film released all over Maharashtra on 10 October 2014.

== Reception ==
Maharashtra Times rated 3 stars out of 5 stars, saying the film comments on rural politics and power-hungry politicians and offers decent entertainment for a couple of hours, though it feels repetitive and stereotypical. Mihir Bhanage of The Times of India gave 3 stars out of 5 stars and wrote "It is not just a mindless entertainer but a very clever one for those who can make out the references in it."

Loksatta said the film is highly entertaining, with sharp writing and dialogues that cleverly comment on today’s politics, making the writer the real hero, well supported by strong performances. Divya Marathi praised the film as a bold and insightful take that exposes political hypocrisy and deserves a triple salute.

== Soundtrack ==
Music of the film was composed by Shashank Powar and Sandeep Jamdar.

Punha Gondhal Punha Mujara

Soundtrack album by Santosh Power & Sandeep Jamdar
- Genre: Feature film soundtrack
- Label: S.M.S. Entertainment

No.	Title	Singer(s)
1	"Hou Dya Kharch"	Reshma Sonawne
2	"Natrangi Naar"	Urmila Dhangar
