= Tirora Assembly constituency =

Constituency of the Maharashtra legislative assembly in India

Coordinates: 21.41°N 79.93°E

Tirora
- Constituency No. 64 for the Maharashtra Legislative Assembly

Constituency details
- Country: India
- Region: Western India
- State: Maharashtra
- District: Gondia
- Lok Sabha constituency: Bhandara-Gondiya
- Established: 1952
- Total electors: 271,696
- Reservation: None

Member of Legislative Assembly
- 15th Maharashtra Legislative Assembly
- Incumbent Vijay Bharatlal Rahangdale
- Party: BJP
- Alliance: NDA
- Elected year: 2024

Tirora Assembly constituency is one of the 288 Vidhan Sabha (legislative assembly) constituencies of Maharashtra state, western India. This constituency is located in Gondia district. The delimitation of the constituency happened in 2008. As of 2019, its representative is Vijay Bharatlal Rahangdale of the Bharatiya Janata Party.

== Geographical scope ==
Tirora taluka and Tirora Municipal Council, parts of Gondiya taluka viz. revenue circle Gangazari, part of Goregaon taluka viz. revenue circle Goregaon.

== Members of the Legislative Assembly ==
| Year | Member | Party |
|---|---|---|
| 1952 | Shaligram Ramratan Dixit | Indian National Congress |
| 1957 | Shaligram Ramratan Dixit | Indian National Congress |
| 1962 | Shaligram Ramratan Dixit | Indian National Congress |
| 1967 | B. L. Patel | Indian National Congress |
| 1972 | Shaligram Ramratan Dixit | Indian National Congress |
| 1978 | Laxminarayan Wasnik | Indian National Congress (I) |
| 1980 | Sukhdev Dongare | Indian National Congress (I) |
| 1985 | Harish More | Indian Congress (Socialist) |
| 1990 | Harish More | Indian National Congress |
| 1995 | Bhajandas Vaidya | Bharatiya Janata Party |
| 1999 | Bhajandas Vaidya | Bharatiya Janata Party |
| 2004 | Dilip Bansod | Nationalist Congress Party |
| 2009 | Khushal Bopche | Bharatiya Janata Party |
| 2014 | Vijay Rahangdale | Bharatiya Janata Party |
| 2019 | Vijay Rahangdale | Bharatiya Janata Party |
| 2024 | Vijay Rahangdale | Bharatiya Janata Party |

== Election results ==
=== Assembly Election 2024 ===
2024 Maharashtra Legislative Assembly election : Tirora
| Party | Candidate | Votes | % | ±% |
|---|---|---|---|---|
| BJP | Vijay Bharatlal Rahangdale | 102,984 | 58.03% | ▲12.36 |
| NCP-SP | Ravikant Khushal Bopche (Guddu) | 60,298 | 33.97% | New |
| People’s Union Party | Ravindra Dilip Soyam | 2,448 | 1.38% | New |
| Independent | Nitesh Shalikram Khobragade | 2,111 | 1.19% | New |
| VBA | Atul Murlidhar Gajbhiye | 1,786 | 1.01% | ▲0.05 |
| BSP | Champalal Dashrath Sathawane | 1,569 | 0.88% | ▼0.63 |
| Independent | Vanita (Kaju) Benilal Thakare | 1,155 | 0.65% | New |
| NOTA | None of the above | 747 | 0.42% | ▼0.68 |
| Margin of victory | | 42,686 | 24.05% | ▲8.55 |
| Turnout | | 178,227 | 65.60% | ▼0.14 |
| Total valid votes | | 177,480 | | |
| Registered electors | | 271,696 | | ▲5.34 |
| BJP hold | | Swing | ▲12.36 | |

=== Assembly Election 2019 ===
2019 Maharashtra Legislative Assembly election : Tirora
| Party | Candidate | Votes | % | ±% |
|---|---|---|---|---|
| BJP | Vijay Bharatlal Rahangdale | 76,482 | 45.67% | ▲13.22 |
| NCP | Bopche Ravikant Alias Guddu Khushal | 50,519 | 30.17% | ▲11.51 |
| Independent | Bansod Dilip Waman | 33,183 | 19.82% | New |
| BSP | Kamal Babulal Hatwar | 2,525 | 1.51% | ▼1.72 |
| NOTA | None of the above | 1,841 | 1.10% | ▲0.37 |
| VBA | Sandip Rajkumar Tilgame | 1,607 | 0.96% | New |
| Margin of victory | | 25,963 | 15.50% | ▲7.65 |
| Turnout | | 169,553 | 65.74% | ▼4.35 |
| Total valid votes | | 167,460 | | |
| Registered electors | | 257,918 | | ▲7.49 |
| BJP hold | | Swing | ▲13.22 | |

=== Assembly Election 2014 ===
2014 Maharashtra Legislative Assembly election : Tirora
| Party | Candidate | Votes | % | ±% |
|---|---|---|---|---|
| BJP | Vijay Bharatlal Rahangdale | 54,160 | 32.45% | ▼6.83 |
| Independent | Bansod Dilip Waman | 41,062 | 24.60% | New |
| NCP | Turkar Rajlaxmi Rajeshkumar | 31,147 | 18.66% | ▼20.19 |
| INC | Katre Parasram Gyaniram | 18,176 | 10.89% | New |
| SS | Bisen Pancham Tanuji | 11,978 | 7.18% | New |
| BSP | Hirapure Dipak Hiralal | 5,394 | 3.23% | ▼14.53 |
| NOTA | None of the above | 1,218 | 0.73% | New |
| Independent | Suresh Dadu Tembhare | 1,074 | 0.64% | New |
| Margin of victory | | 13,098 | 7.85% | ▲7.42 |
| Turnout | | 168,173 | 70.09% | ▼2.44 |
| Total valid votes | | 166,904 | | |
| Registered electors | | 239,939 | | ▲21.05 |
| BJP hold | | Swing | ▼6.83 | |

=== Assembly Election 2009 ===
2009 Maharashtra Legislative Assembly election : Tirora
| Party | Candidate | Votes | % | ±% |
|---|---|---|---|---|
| BJP | Khushal Bopche | 56,450 | 39.28% | ▲9.28 |
| NCP | Rahangdale Sushilkumar Sukhadev | 55,827 | 38.85% | ▼7.05 |
| BSP | Hirapure Dipak Hiralal | 25,527 | 17.76% | ▲0.80 |
| Independent | Salam Dr. Harishchandra Bhivaram | 2,005 | 1.40% | New |
| Independent | Wasnik Sudhir Sukhadev | 1,015 | 0.71% | New |
| Margin of victory | | 623 | 0.43% | ▼15.47 |
| Turnout | | 143,775 | 72.53% | ▲2.99 |
| Total valid votes | | 143,696 | | |
| Registered electors | | 198,218 | | ▲28.29 |
| BJP gain from NCP | | Swing | ▼6.62 | |

=== Assembly Election 2004 ===
2004 Maharashtra Legislative Assembly election : Tirora
| Party | Candidate | Votes | % | ±% |
|---|---|---|---|---|
| NCP | Dilip Waman Bansod | 49,271 | 45.90% | ▲26.33 |
| BJP | Vaidya Bhajandas Vithoba | 32,202 | 30.00% | ▼6.88 |
| BSP | More Harish Ukandrao | 18,207 | 16.96% | ▲15.63 |
| Independent | Wasnik Sudhir Sukhdeo | 3,551 | 3.31% | New |
| Independent | Walde Mahendra Kashinath | 1,518 | 1.41% | New |
| SP | Kolhatkar Sanam | 1,312 | 1.22% | New |
| Independent | Gajbhiye Sewakram Lahanuji | 747 | 0.70% | New |
| Margin of victory | | 17,069 | 15.90% | ▲1.76 |
| Turnout | | 107,442 | 69.54% | ▲1.66 |
| Total valid votes | | 107,337 | | |
| Registered electors | | 154,508 | | ▲6.62 |
| NCP gain from BJP | | Swing | ▲9.02 | |

=== Assembly Election 1999 ===
1999 Maharashtra Legislative Assembly election : Tirora
| Party | Candidate | Votes | % | ±% |
|---|---|---|---|---|
| BJP | Vaidya Bhajandas Vithoba | 34,315 | 36.88% | ▼5.48 |
| RPI | Meshram Nagorao Shrawan | 21,158 | 22.74% | New |
| NCP | More Harish Ukandrao | 18,213 | 19.57% | New |
| Independent | Binzade Vishnu Barku | 18,125 | 19.48% | New |
| BSP | Ukey Bhaudas Baliram | 1,234 | 1.33% | ▼0.53 |
| Margin of victory | | 13,157 | 14.14% | ▼7.16 |
| Turnout | | 98,367 | 67.88% | ▼13.52 |
| Total valid votes | | 93,045 | | |
| Registered electors | | 144,911 | | ▼2.04 |
| BJP hold | | Swing | ▼5.48 | |

=== Assembly Election 1995 ===
1995 Maharashtra Legislative Assembly election : Tirora
| Party | Candidate | Votes | % | ±% |
|---|---|---|---|---|
| BJP | Vaidya Bhajandas Vithoba | 49,597 | 42.36% | ▲7.17 |
| INC | Shende Krishnkumar Raghunath | 24,663 | 21.06% | ▼24.78 |
| Independent | More Harish Ukandrao | 23,558 | 20.12% | New |
| JD | Bhiwgade Suryamani Nathuji | 7,375 | 6.30% | New |
| Independent | Dahate Ramdas Fukatu | 2,388 | 2.04% | New |
| Independent | Bariykar Deorao Bhayalal | 2,256 | 1.93% | New |
| BSP | Langewar Amritlal Fagu | 2,177 | 1.86% | ▲1.15 |
| Independent | Sakhare Arvind Tarachand | 1,243 | 1.06% | New |
| Margin of victory | | 24,934 | 21.30% | ▲10.65 |
| Turnout | | 120,409 | 81.40% | ▲14.55 |
| Total valid votes | | 117,085 | | |
| Registered electors | | 147,927 | | ▲4.60 |
| BJP gain from INC | | Swing | ▼3.48 | |

=== Assembly Election 1990 ===
1990 Maharashtra Legislative Assembly election : Tirora
| Party | Candidate | Votes | % | ±% |
|---|---|---|---|---|
| INC | More Harish Ukandrao | 42,650 | 45.84% | ▲13.63 |
| BJP | Binzade Vishnu Barku | 32,743 | 35.19% | New |
| CPI | Thaware Subhash Karudas | 6,023 | 6.47% | New |
| RPI(K) | Harischandra Diwan Meshram | 5,118 | 5.50% | ▼1.16 |
| Independent | Sushilabal Rambhau Wankhede | 1,221 | 1.31% | New |
| BRP | Sachidanand Jiraman Fulekar | 1,201 | 1.29% | New |
| Independent | K. H. Jambhulkar | 1,036 | 1.11% | New |
| BSP | G. V. Bawane (Guruji) | 663 | 0.71% | New |
| Margin of victory | | 9,907 | 10.65% | ▼10.94 |
| Turnout | | 94,546 | 66.85% | ▲0.65 |
| Total valid votes | | 93,036 | | |
| Registered electors | | 141,421 | | ▲16.73 |
| INC gain from IC(S) | | Swing | ▼7.96 | |

=== Assembly Election 1985 ===
1985 Maharashtra Legislative Assembly election : Tirora
| Party | Candidate | Votes | % | ±% |
|---|---|---|---|---|
| IC(S) | More Harish Ukandrao | 42,336 | 53.80% | New |
| INC | Tirpude Rajkumar Nashikrao | 25,346 | 32.21% | New |
| RPI(K) | Meshram Timaji Kisan | 5,239 | 6.66% | ▼3.87 |
| Independent | Desai Chandrabodh Ramlal | 1,304 | 1.66% | New |
| Independent | Rangari Nathaubhau Vithoba | 937 | 1.19% | New |
| Independent | Dongre Jagdish Harichand | 792 | 1.01% | New |
| CPI(M) | Meshram Haridas Dewaji | 577 | 0.73% | New |
| Independent | Lanjewar Amrutlal Faguji | 510 | 0.65% | New |
| Margin of victory | | 16,990 | 21.59% | ▼3.75 |
| Turnout | | 80,204 | 66.20% | ▲10.43 |
| Total valid votes | | 78,687 | | |
| Registered electors | | 121,152 | | ▲3.57 |
| IC(S) gain from INC(I) | | Swing | ▲0.98 | |

=== Assembly Election 1980 ===
1980 Maharashtra Legislative Assembly election : Tirora
| Party | Candidate | Votes | % | ±% |
|---|---|---|---|---|
| INC(I) | Dongare Sukhadeo Vithobaji | 33,641 | 52.82% | ▲2.03 |
| INC(U) | Wasnik Laxminarayan Ganpat | 17,498 | 27.47% | New |
| RPI(K) | Domngare Manikrao Raghunath | 6,704 | 10.53% | ▼23.11 |
| BJP | Laokar Indrarao Raoji | 4,437 | 6.97% | New |
| Independent | Meshram Haribhau Hansaram | 647 | 1.02% | New |
| Independent | Ramteke Nandlal Abhiman | 592 | 0.93% | New |
| Margin of victory | | 16,143 | 25.34% | ▲8.19 |
| Turnout | | 65,234 | 55.77% | ▼17.85 |
| Total valid votes | | 63,695 | | |
| Registered electors | | 116,976 | | ▲4.15 |
| INC(I) hold | | Swing | ▲2.03 | |

=== Assembly Election 1978 ===
1978 Maharashtra Legislative Assembly election : Tirora
| Party | Candidate | Votes | % | ±% |
|---|---|---|---|---|
| INC(I) | Wasnik Laxminarayan Ganpat | 40,768 | 50.79% | New |
| RPI(K) | Meshram Nagorao Shrawan | 27,005 | 33.64% | New |
| Independent | Larokar Gulabrao Gomaji | 2,818 | 3.51% | New |
| Independent | Choure Bhaudas Zoluji | 2,056 | 2.56% | New |
| Independent | Mohankar Dilip Pusaram | 1,989 | 2.48% | New |
| Independent | Nagdavane Pancham Chamru | 1,661 | 2.07% | New |
| Independent | Bhautik Dadubhau Arjun | 1,488 | 1.85% | New |
| Independent | Dhok Govinda Kashinath | 1,400 | 1.74% | New |
| Margin of victory | | 13,763 | 17.15% | ▲14.15 |
| Turnout | | 82,679 | 73.62% | ▲4.98 |
| Total valid votes | | 80,272 | | |
| Registered electors | | 112,310 | | ▲15.46 |
| INC(I) gain from INC | | Swing | ▲9.47 | |

=== Assembly Election 1972 ===
1972 Maharashtra Legislative Assembly election : Tirora
| Party | Candidate | Votes | % | ±% |
|---|---|---|---|---|
| INC | Shaligram Ramratan Dixit | 26,851 | 41.32% | ▼2.49 |
| Independent | Chaitlal Ramji Bhagat | 24,903 | 38.32% | New |
| RPI | Sadanand M. Ramteke | 10,235 | 15.75% | ▼6.42 |
| Independent | Ganpatlimbaji Yedmache | 1,337 | 2.06% | New |
| AIFB | K. M. Rahangdale | 1,086 | 1.67% | New |
| Independent | Bhayalal Sitaram Shende | 572 | 0.88% | New |
| Margin of victory | | 1,948 | 3.00% | ▼12.71 |
| Turnout | | 66,768 | 68.64% | ▼5.64 |
| Total valid votes | | 64,984 | | |
| Registered electors | | 97,274 | | ▲8.20 |
| INC hold | | Swing | ▼2.49 | |

=== Assembly Election 1967 ===
1967 Maharashtra Legislative Assembly election : Tirora
| Party | Candidate | Votes | % | ±% |
|---|---|---|---|---|
| INC | B. L. Patel | 26,121 | 43.81% | ▲5.01 |
| SSP | G. J. Gaharwar | 16,754 | 28.10% | New |
| RPI | H. D. Meshram | 13,215 | 22.17% | New |
| ABJS | C. D. Bais | 1,509 | 2.53% | New |
| Independent | M. V. Admane | 1,052 | 1.76% | New |
| Independent | C. K. Bodele | 970 | 1.63% | New |
| Margin of victory | | 9,367 | 15.71% | ▲9.69 |
| Turnout | | 66,780 | 74.28% | ▼0.59 |
| Total valid votes | | 59,621 | | |
| Registered electors | | 89,906 | | ▲30.43 |
| INC hold | | Swing | ▲5.01 | |

=== Assembly Election 1962 ===
1962 Maharashtra Legislative Assembly election : Tirora
| Party | Candidate | Votes | % | ±% |
|---|---|---|---|---|
| INC | Shaligram Ramratan Dixit | 18,425 | 38.80% | ▼9.12 |
| RPI | Narayan Hari Kjumbhare | 15,564 | 32.78% | New |
| Independent | Mitaram Hari Tembharey | 12,596 | 26.53% | New |
| Independent | Adhinath Gulab Gharde | 902 | 1.90% | New |
| Margin of victory | | 2,861 | 6.02% | ▼12.69 |
| Turnout | | 51,607 | 74.87% | ▲14.48 |
| Total valid votes | | 47,487 | | |
| Registered electors | | 68,932 | | ▲1.32 |
| INC hold | | Swing | ▼9.12 | |

=== Assembly Election 1957 ===
1957 Bombay State Legislative Assembly election : Tirora
| Party | Candidate | Votes | % | ±% |
|---|---|---|---|---|
| INC | Shaligram Ramratan Dixit | 19,691 | 47.92% | ▼1.23 |
| SCF | Dongre Tulsiram Surbaji | 12,005 | 29.22% | New |
| PSP | Bante Hariram Chindhu | 9,394 | 22.86% | New |
| Margin of victory | | 7,686 | 18.71% | ▲4.56 |
| Turnout | | 41,090 | 60.39% | ▲5.54 |
| Total valid votes | | 41,090 | | |
| Registered electors | | 68,037 | | ▲57.50 |
| INC hold | | Swing | ▼1.23 | |

=== Assembly Election 1952 ===
1952 Hyderabad State Legislative Assembly election : Tirora
| Party | Candidate | Votes | % | ±% |
|---|---|---|---|---|
| INC | Shaligram Ramratan Dixit | 11,644 | 49.15% | New |
| Socialist | Gulabsingh Jaswantsingh Gahherwar | 8,292 | 35.00% | New |
| ABJS | Baliram Joshi Choudhari | 1,828 | 7.72% | New |
| Independent | Bhayyalal Ramaji Kathana | 876 | 3.70% | New |
| Independent | Motilal Gangaram Zararia | 809 | 3.41% | New |
| Independent | Milkiram Laljiram Sharma | 244 | 1.03% | New |
| Margin of victory | | 3,352 | 14.15% | |
| Turnout | | 23,693 | 54.85% | |
| Total valid votes | | 23,693 | | |
| Registered electors | | 43,199 | | |
| INC win (new seat) | | | | |

== See also ==
- Gondiya district
- List of constituencies of Maharashtra Legislative Assembly
