= Nagesh Bhonsle =

Indian actor and film director

Nagesh Bhosale
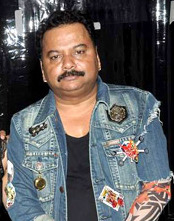
- Occupations: Film actor, producer, director
- Children: Kuhu Bhonsle

Nagesh Bhosale is an Indian film, television and theatre actor. He acted in Anuja which is nominated at the 97th Academy Awards (Oscar 2025) in the live action short film category. He also worked on the 2018 film Hotel Mumbai, alongside Jason Isaacs, Armie Hammer and Dev Patel. Nagesh has acted in more than a hundred Indian films and thousands of episodes in television shows. He is one of the favourite villains of Marathi cinema and television.

In 2014, he founded Ajna Motion Picture Pvt. Ltd., a film production house. Ajna's first film Panhala (2015), directed and produced by Nagesh, is critically acclaimed, won many awards and featured at domestic and foreign film festivals including the 25th Golden Rooster in China. His next film Nati Khel, was invited to be screened at the PAMLA conference in Los Angeles, California and was open for dialogue between filmmakers and the scholarly patrons of PAMLA. It has also won the title "Film of Special Recommendation" at the Wuhan International Art Film Festival, in China, December 2016.

In 2017, it won the Special Jury Mention at the Bodhisattva International Film Festival, it also won Best Story & Best Art Direction at Sanskruti Kala Darpan Awards in Mumbai, Best Director at Ottawa International Film Festival in Canada, Best Cinematography & Best Actress in Golden Gate International Film Festival in USA California. It also has been an official selection at Pune International Film Festival, and Orange City International Film Festival.

== Filmography ==
=== As an actor ===
==== International movies ====
- Anuja (2024)
- The Warrior Queen of Jhansi (2019)
- Hotel Mumbai (2018)

==== Hindi movies ====
- Bombay Boys (1998)
- Shool (1999) as Sudhir Vinod
- Lal Salam (2002)
- Dum as Jitendra Salvi (Jeetu Bhai)
- Bardaasht (2004) as Lawyer
- D (2005)
- Sarkar (2005)
- Kyon Ki... (2005)
- Hostel (2007)
- Shiva (2006)
- Billu (2009)
- 31st October (2015)
- Aawhan (2015)
- Nati Khel (2017)
- Dharavi Bank (2022)
- Bandar (2025)

==== Marathi movies ====
- The Maharashtra Files
- Raanti (2024)
- Ye Re Ye Re Paisa 3 (2024)
- Ek Daav Bhutacha (2024)
- Fauji (2024)
- Tu Ka Patil (2018)
- Hichyasathi Kay Pan (2018)
- Jugaad (2016)
- Ganvesh (2015)
- Shasan (2015)
- Panhala (2015) as Balkrishna
- Goshta Choti Dongraevadhi as Nandu
- Nati (2014)
- Dhag (2014)
- Duniyadari (2013)
- Gallit Gondhal, Dillit Mujra (Politician/Sarpanch)
- Chingi
- Vishwavinayak
- Punha Gondhal Punha Mujra
- Pyaar Vali Love Story
- Chintu 2
- Chimani Pakhar (2001)
- Premankur (1993) as Mr.Valture
- Sata Lota Pan Sagla Khota (2014)

==== Marathi serials ====
- Damini (1997)
- Agnihotra (2009–2010)
- Devyani
- Yek Number (2015)
- Tujhya Ishkacha Nadkhula (2021)

==== Hindi serials ====
- Taarak Mehta Ka Ooltah Chashmah as Raavan

=== As a director ===
- Goshta Choti Dongraevadhi (2009)
- Gallit Gondhal, Dillit Mujra (2009)
- Adgula Madgula (2011)
- Panhala (2015)
- Nati Khel (2017)
- Sanchar (2017)

=== As a producer ===
After completing endless projects in the Hindi, Marathi and Telugu language fraternity as an actor, he ventured into Directing and Producing. He has successfully made 6 films so far, as a director. In 2009, his debut film Goshta Choti Dongraevadhi, a commentary on the farmer's suicides in Maharashtra, (English: A story as small as a mountain) was highly appreciated by the critics and audiences at the time. Nagesh's films are enthralling and speak of the contemporary issues in India. A small chunk of the films he creates can be viewed as feminist films which portray the conflicts of Indian women.

=== Awards for Nati Khel ===
| Film Festival | Year | Category | Country |
|---|---|---|---|
| Wuhan International Art Film Festival | 2016 | Film of Special Recommendation | China |
| PAMLA | 2016 | Special Screening | USA (Los Angeles) |
| Orange City International Film Festival | 2017 | Official Selection | India (Nagpur) |
| Pune International Film Festival | 2017 | Official Selection | India (Pune) |
| Bodhisattva International Film Festival | 2017 | Special Jury Mention | India (Patna) |
| Sanskruti Kala Darpan Marathi Film Festival | 2017 | Best Story & Best Art Director | India (Mumbai) |
| Sweden Marathi International Film Festival | 2017 | Official Selection | Sweden |
| OTTAWA Indian Film Festival | 2017 | Best Director | Canada |
| Golden Gate International Film Festival | 2017 | Best Cinematographer & Best Actress | USA |

=== Awards for Panhala ===
| Film Festival | Year | Category | Country |
|---|---|---|---|
| Kokata International Film Festival | 2015 | Official Selection | India (Kolkata) |
| Chitra Padarpan Puraskar | 2015 | Best Cinematographer & Best Actress | India (Pune) |
| Kalyan International Film Festival | 2015 | Best Cinematographer | India (Mumbai) |
| MATA Sanman Awards | 2015 | Best Actress | India (Mumbai) |
| 25th Golden Rooster & 100 Flowers Film Festival | 2016 | Official Selection | China |
| Nashik International Film Festival | 2016 | Best Feature Film, Best Director & Best Actor | India (Nashik) |
| Silk Road International Film Exhibition | 2016 | Official Selection | China |
