= Ansuyabai Borkar =

Indian politician and social activist

Member of the Lok Sabha
- In office 1955–1957
- Constituency: Bhandara

Personal details
- Born: 1929; Kampti, Central Provinces and Berar, British Raj
- Died: 18 July 2000 (aged 70–71); Nagpur, India
- Political party: Indian National Congress

Ansuyabai Bhaorao Borkar was a social activist, Indian National Congress (INC) politician and member of the 1st Lok Sabha, the lower house of the Indian Parliament from 1955 to 1957.

== Early life ==
Ansuyabai was born in Kampti, Madhya Pradesh (then a part of Central Provinces and Berar) in 1929 to a family of cultivators. She received education from Salem Girls Hindi English Middle School of Raipur.

== Career ==
Borkar was an active social worker and conducted education programs for adult women in Nagpur. She was also a member of the Nagpur district committee of the Indian National Congress (INC) party.

After the death of her husband, a sitting MP, Borkar contested for and won a seat from the two-member Bhandara (Reserved, Madhya Pradesh) constituency in the 1955 by-election as an INC candidate, obtaining 84,458 votes. The opposing Scheduled Castes Federation candidate secured approximately 58,000 votes.

== Personal life ==
In 1947, she married INC politician Bhaurao Borkar. Together they had three daughters. Bhaurao was an MP from Bhandara and died in office on 2 February 1955.

Borkar died in Nagpur, Maharashtra on 18 July 2000.
