= Praful Patel =

Indian politician and sports administrator (born 1957)

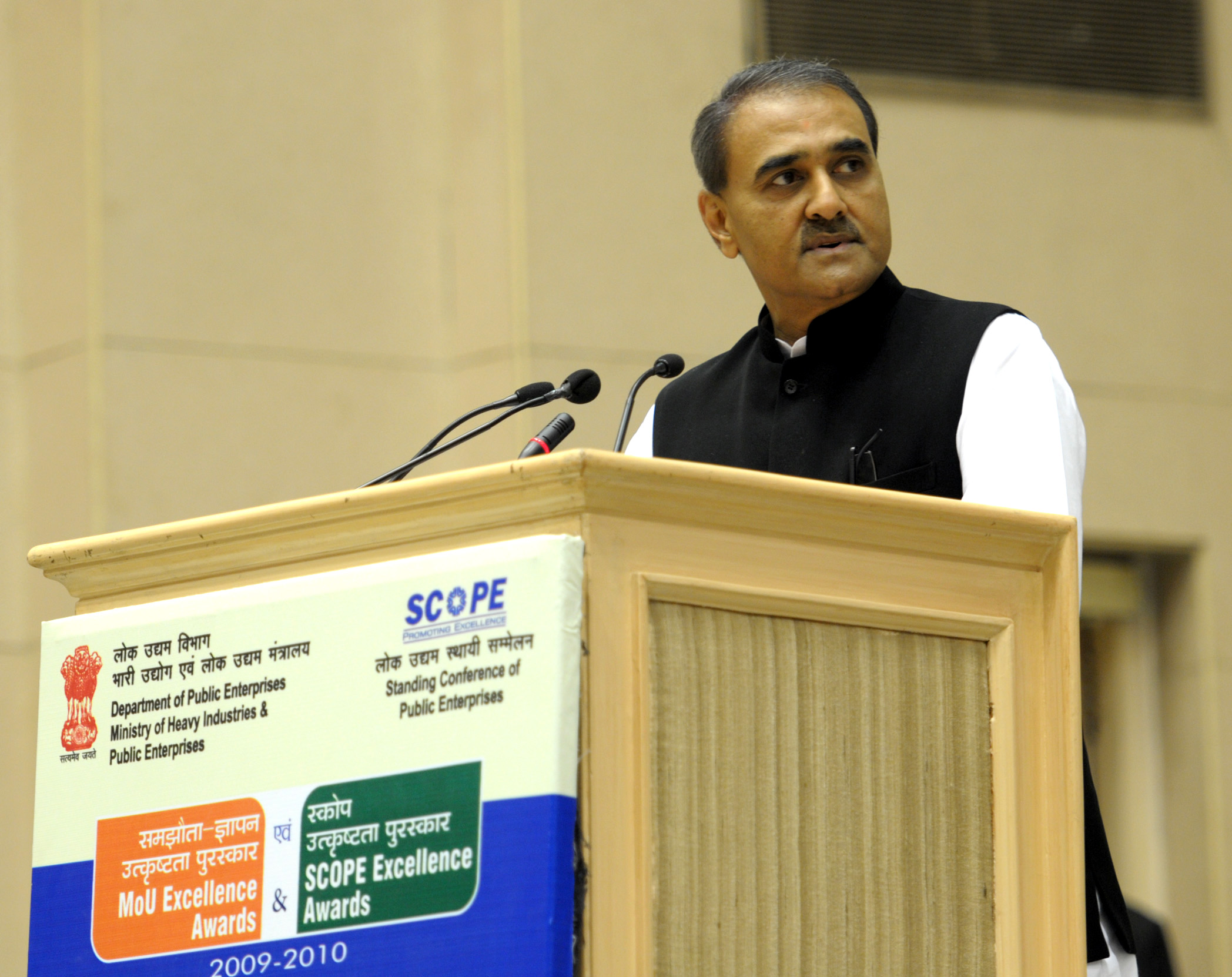

Union Minister of Heavy Industries and Public Enterprises
- In office 19 January 2011 – 26 May 2014
- President: Pratibha Patil; Pranab Mukherjee
- Prime Minister: Manmohan Singh
- Preceded by: Santosh Mohan Dev
- Succeeded by: Anant Geete

Union Minister of State (Independent Charge) for Civil Aviation
- In office 23 May 2004 – 18 January 2011
- President: A. P. J. Abdul Kalam; Pratibha Patil
- Prime Minister: Manmohan Singh
- Preceded by: Rajiv Pratap Rudy
- Succeeded by: Vayalar Ravi

Member of Parliament, Lok Sabha
- In office (1991–1999), (2009–2014)
- Constituency: Bhandara; Bhandara–Gondiya

Member of Parliament, Rajya Sabha
- Incumbent
- Assumed office (2000–2009), (2014–present)
- Constituency: Maharashtra
Party Political Offices
National President of Nationalist Congress Party
In office 28 January 2026 – 26 February 2026
Preceded by	Ajit Pawar
Succeeded by	Sunetra Pawar
National Vice President of Nationalist Congress Party
In office 16 September 2022 – 2 July 2023
Football Administration Offices
President of Western India Football Association
Incumbent
Assumed office
2002
President of All India Football Federation
In office
20 October 2009 – 18 May 2022
Senior Vice President of Asian Football Confederation (SAFF zone)
In office
2016–2019
Member of the FIFA Finance Committee
In office
2017–2021
Member of the FIFA Council
In office
2019–2023

Personal details
- Born: Praful Manoharbhai Patel; 17 February 1957 (age 69) Calcutta, West Bengal, India
- Party: Nationalist Congress Party
- Spouse: Varsha Patel (m. 1977)
- Children: 4
- Website: praful-patel.com

Praful Manoharbhai Patil (born 17 February 1957) is an Indian politician, industrialist and sports administrator. He is associated with the Nationalist Congress Party from Maharashtra.

He was the president of India's association football governing body the All India Football Federation (AIFF) from 2009 until 2022 when the Committee of Administrators (CoA) took over the interim administration following the appointment by the Supreme Court. He became the Asian Football Confederation's vice president of the SAFF region at the AFC Congress held in Bahrain in 2015. In December 2016, he was appointed the Senior Vice President of the Asian Football Confederation. In 2017, he became a member of a FIFA Finance Committee for a term of four years. He also serves as the President of the Western India Football Association, the state football governing body of Maharashtra.

On the 25th anniversary of the Nationalist Congress Party (NCP), Party Chief Sharad Pawar appointed Praful Patel and Supriya Sule as working presidents of the Party.

== Early life and education ==
Praful Patel is the son of Indian National Congress politician Manoharbhau Patel, who represented Gondia in the Maharashtra Legislative Assembly. His father died when Patel was 13. His family is Gujarati, but more deeply connected to Marathis and Maharashtra. runs the Ceejay Group, a tobacco conglomerate.

Patel attended Mumbai's Campion School, and the Sydenham College of Commerce and Economics. He graduated with a Bachelor of Commerce degree from the University of Bombay.

== Career ==
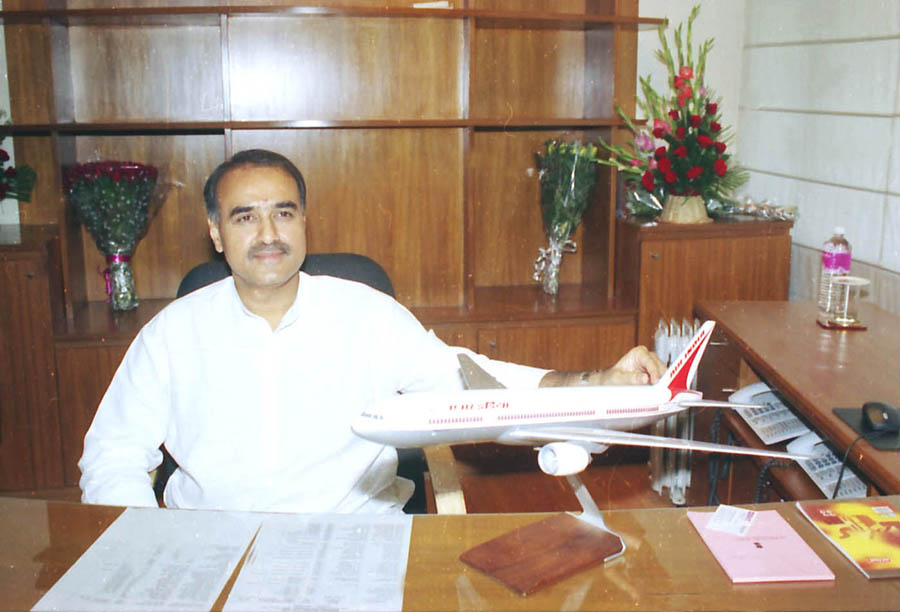
Praful Patel assumes the charge of the Minister of State (Independent Charge) for Civil Aviation in New Delhi on 24 May 2004

=== Political career ===
Patel followed in his father's footsteps in choosing a political career. In 1985, he became the president of the Gondia Municipal Council, and in the 1991 Indian general election was elected to the 10th Lok Sabha. In 1996 and 1998 he was re-elected to the 11th Lok Sabha and 12th Lok Sabha respectively. Patel has served on a number of parliamentary committees, including the Consultative Committee of the Ministry of Environment and Forests (1991–1996), the Committee on Science and Technology (1994–1995), the Committee on Home Affairs (1995–1996), the Committee on Finance (1996–97), and the Consultative Committee of the Ministry of Civil Aviation. He was elected to the Rajya Sabha as a representative of Maharashtra in 2000. He was re-elected to the Rajya Sabha for his second term in 2006, and in the 2009 was elected to the 15th Lok Sabha for a fourth term. He was elected to the Rajya Sabha from Maharashtra in 2016.

From 2004 to 2011, Patel was served as the Minister of Civil Aviation. In this role, the government increased the foreign direct investment cap in the domestic airlines sector from 40% to 49%. On 19 January 2011, Patel was relieved of Civil Aviation portfolio and became the cabinet minister for Minister of the Heavy Industries and Public Enterprises.

On 9 January 2013, Patel launched the National Electric Mobility Mission Plan (NEMMP) 2020 roadmap for introducing electric and hybrid vehicles in India. Patel launched a project to build the world's largest solar power plant near Sambhar Lake in Rajasthan. The project was planned to generate roughly 4000 MW of power, but following protest from environmental groups, the project site was moved to Kharaghoda in Surendranagar district of Gujarat.

=== AIFF President ===
In 2013, Patel placed a bid for India to host the 2015 and 2016 FIFA Club World Cup.

Under Patel, the All India Football Federation (AIFF) introduced the Indian Super League run by the Football Sports Development Pvt Ltd., which aims to make Indian football more competitive at an international level. In April 2014, Patel announced the eight franchise owners in the Indian Super League.

Patel signed agreements with the German Football Association (DFB), the French Football Federation (FFF) and the Japan Football Association (JFA) in 2015 for their support and expertise for the "mutual growth, promotion and continuous emphasis on the development of football."

Patel brought back international friendlies to India, with Mumbai awarded its first international match in 61 years when India hosted Puerto Rico in 2016. Praful has said that India will host more friendly matches in the future.

On 28 March 2016, Patel announced the commencement of a women's league later in 2016. In a Special General Body Meeting of the AIFF held in New Delhi, a women's league was introduced in line with Patel's plans to place more emphasis on women's football. On 17 October 2016, the women's football league trial kicked off for the first time in India in the city of Cuttack. On 24 January 2017 AIFF President Praful Patel launched the inaugural edition of the Indian Women's League at New Delhi. The league will commence from 28 January with six teams participating in it.

On 1 December 2016, Patel was appointed the senior vice president of the Asian Football Confederation. India subsequently won the rights to host the FIFA U-17 World Cup India 2017 and hosted the AFC U-16 Championship in September 2016. The All India Football Federation has also won the AFC Developing Member Association of the Year Award at the AFC's Annual Awards 2016 held in Abu Dhabi, United Arab Emirates.

On 21 January 2016, Praful Patel was elected unopposed as the AIFF President for the third consecutive term.

Patel was removed from his presidency of the AIFF by the Supreme Court and replaced by a Committee of Administrators (CoA) after failing to organise presidential elections despite his third term expiring in December 2020.

==== Alleged role in AIFF's suspension by FIFA ====
In August 2022, FIFA suspended the All India Football Federation for violating its statutes on third-party interference. India was stripped of its hosting rights for international football tournaments, including the 2022 FIFA U-17 Women's World Cup scheduled for October 2022. Patel who had stayed in office as the AIFF president despite his third term expiring in December 2020 had been replaced by a Supreme Court appointed Committee of Administrators (CoA). Patel was accused of orchestrating the AIFF's suspension by arranging a letter from FIFA and the Asian Football Confederation threatening AIFF with a suspension if he wasn't restored to its presidency. The Supreme Court dissolved the CoA and restored day-to-day management to the AIFF on 22 August. FIFA lifted its suspension of the AIFF on 26 August, and restored the rights to the U-17 Women's World Cup.

=== Memberships and chairman positions ===
Patel is chairman of the Manoharbhai Patel Charitable Trust, which funds the Manoharbhai Patel Institute of Engineering and Technology, the president of the Gondia Education Society, the Gondwana Club, Nagpur Lions International Club and the Cricket Club of Mumbai.

== Elections Contested ==
=== Lok Sabha ===
Year	Constituency	Party	Votes	%	Opponent	Opponent Party	Opponent Votes	%	Result	Margin	%
1991	Bhandara	INC	325,553	57.40	Khushal Bopche	BJP	161,995	28.60	Won	163,558	28.80
1996	Bhandara	INC	259,630	42.10	Ram Gopal Aswale	BJP	252,667	41.00	Won	6,963	1.10
1998	Bhandara	INC	324,542	48.30	Narayandas Saraf	BJP	305,236	45.40	Won	19,306	2.90
2009	Bhandara–Gondiya	NCP	489,814	47.52	Nana Patole	Ind	237,899	23.08	Won	251,915	24.44
2014	Bhandara–Gondiya	NCP	456,875	38.16	Nana Patole	BJP	606,129	50.62	Lost	-149,254	-12.46

=== Rajya Sabha ===
Position	Party	Constituency	From	To	Tenure
Member of Parliament, Rajya Sabha (1st Term)	NCP	Maharashtra	3 April 2000	2 April 2006	5 years, 364 days
Member of Parliament, Rajya Sabha (2nd Term)	NCP	Maharashtra	3 April 2006	16 May 2009	3 years, 43 days
Member of Parliament, Rajya Sabha (3rd Term)	NCP	Maharashtra	13 June 2014	4 July 2016	2 years, 21 days
Member of Parliament, Rajya Sabha (4th Term)	NCP	Maharashtra	5 July 2016	4 July 2022	5 years, 364 days
Member of Parliament, Rajya Sabha (5th Term)	NCP	Maharashtra	5 July 2022	27 February 2024	1 year, 237 days
Member of Parliament, Rajya Sabha (6th Term)	NCP	Maharashtra	3 April 2024	2 April 2030	5 years, 364 days
