= Samidha Guru =

Indian actress

- Born: 6 August 1980 (age 45); Nagpur, Maharashtra, India
- Occupations: Film & Television actress
- Spouse: Abhijit Guru (m. 2005)
- Children: 1

Samidha Guru (born 6 August 1980) is a Marathi theatre, film and television actress from Nagpur, India. She has received Maharashtra State's Best Actress Award for the movie Kapus Kondyachi Goshta. She also received MMW Gaurav Awards for Best Actress for the play Get Well Soon.

Having a family background of dance, writing and acting, Samidha made her acting debut on television through Soniyacha Umbara but she got noticed in Avaghachi Sansar, in which she played an angry young woman. After this, she did prominent roles in many popular serials which include Jeevalaga, Zunj, Ya Valanavar, Devyani, Gandh Phulancha Gela Sangun, Kamla, Tujvin Sakhya Re.

Samidha has also acted in many stage plays at Nagpur in some of the plays she got silver medal for her performances. On the big screen, Guru has also done prominent roles in Kaydyache Bola, Majha Me, Dhating Dhingana, Panhala and Tukaram wherein her acting was appreciated.

== Early life and education ==
Her father, Suresh Deshpande was a noted writer and director of Marathi plays and films. Her mother Meena Deshpande is Kathak alankar, Dance teacher and theatre actress. Her sister Mrunal Deshpande is a Kathak Visharad and actress. Samidha married Abhijit Guru, a well known writer, actor and director.

Guru studied at M.P.D.S. Lokanchi Shala Nagpur. She has also completed B.Sc. (Microbiology) along with B.A. (English literature) from Lad College, Nagpur. Before shifting to Mumbai, she had actively participated in theatre and also did a teaching job for a couple of years. After her marriage, she came to Mumbai and got a break on small screen.

== Filmography ==
- Mogra Phulaalaa (2019)
- Bhir Bhir (Upcoming)
- Laal Ishq (2016)
- Panhala (2015)
- Kapuskondyachi Gosht (2014)
- Majha Mee (2014)
- Dhating Dhingana (2014)
- Tukaram (2013)
- Kaydyaach Bola (2010)

== Stage appearances ==
- Get well Soon (Writer : Prashant Dalvi & Director : Chandrakant Kulkarni)
- Talyat Malyat (Written & Directed By: Abhijit Guru)

== Television serials ==
- Ajunahi Barsaat Aahe (Sony Marathi)
- Shubhmangal Online (Colors Marathi)
- Crime Patrol (Sony Entertainment Television)
- Kamla (Colors Marathi)
- Gandh Phulancha Gela Sangun (ETV Marathi)
- Tujvin Sakhya Re (Star Pravah)
- Ghe Bharari (Mi Marathi)
- Devyani (Star Pravah)
- Vilakshan (Saam TV)
- Ya Valanavar (ETV Marathi)
- Jeevlaga (Star Pravah)
- Zunj (Star Pravah)
- Avaghachi Sansar (Zee Marathi)
- Soniyacha Umbara (ETV Marathi)
- Gane Tumche Aamche (ETV Marathi)
- Na Umra Ki Seema Ho (Star Bharat)
- Lavangi Mirchi (Zee Marathi)

== Honors and awards ==
- Best Actress for Movie ‘Kapuskondyachi Gosht’ – Maharashtra State Awards 2014
- Best Actress for Movie ‘Kapuskondyachi Gosht’ – MaTa Sanman 2017
- Best Actress for Movie ‘Kapuskondyachi Gosht’ – Chitrapat Padarpan Awards 2017
- Best Actress for play ‘Get Well Soon’ – MMW Gaurav Awards 2014
