= Makarand Anaspure =

Indian actor (born 1973)

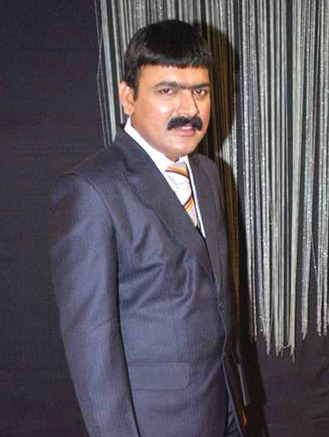
- Anaspure in 2012
- Born: Makarand Madhukar Anaspure; 22 July 1973 (age 53)
- Citizenship: Indian
- Education: Saraswati Bhuvan College
- Occupations: Actor; producer; director
- Years active: 1995–present
- Organization: Naam Foundation
- Spouse: Shilpa Anaspure (m. 2001)
- Children: 2
- Awards: Bal Gandharva; Star Screen Award; Zee Cine Awards

Makarand Madhukar Anaspure (Marathi pronunciation: [məkəɾən̪d̪ ənaːspuɾe]; born 22 July 1973) is an Indian actor, director and producer mainly appeared in Marathi films and theatre.

== Early life ==
Anaspure was born in Aurangabad into a Marathi-speaking family. He completed his primary education in Beed district. He studied in Saraswati Bhuwan College and graduated in drama, performing over 400 to 500 street plays in Aurangabad.

== Career ==
Anaspure came to fame after having worked in Saatchya Aat Gharat and Kaydyacha Bola. He credits Nana Patekar for his access into the film industry. Anaspure is known for his ability to use the Marathwada accent of the Marathi language.

His gained popularity with De Dhakka, Gallit Gondhal, Dillit Mujra, Gadhvacha Lagna and Saade Made Tin.

Makarand has also acted in Bollywood films and Hindi TV serials like CID, Tu Tu Main Main and films like My Friend Ganesha 3, Jis Desh Mein Ganga Rehta Hain, Vaastav and Yashwant.

Anaspure directed the Marathi film Dambis, in 2011. He has also produced films.

== Personal life ==
Makarand Anaspure married Shilpa Anaspure, in a traditional ceremony on 30 November 2001 in Pune. Shilpa Anaspure hails from a small a town called Varveli, near Guhagar in Konkan, but she was born and brought up in Mumbai. They had a love marriage, the couple met for the first time in 2000, while working in the drama Jau Bai Jorat. They have a son Indraneel and a daughter Indrayani. After marriage, Shilpa acted in a few films with Makarand Anaspure including Sumbaran (2009), Goshta Choti Dongraevadhi (2009), Tukya Tukavila Nagya Nachvila (2010), Kapus Kondyachi Goshta (2014).

== Naam Foundation ==
In September 2015, Anaspure and Nana Patekar established an organisation called Naam Foundation, which works to provide farmers aid to overcome the drought conditions in rural Marathwada and Vidarbha in the state of Maharashtra, India.

== Filmography ==
=== Films ===
Key
†	Denotes films that have not yet been released

Note: All films are in Marathi, unless mentioned.

Year	Title	Role	Notes	Ref.
1997	Yeshwant	Eyewitness	Assistant director; Hindi film	
1997	Sarkarnama	Natha		
1998	Wajood	Unnamed	Hindi film	
1999	Vaastav: The Reality	Raghu's friend	Hindi film	
2000	Jis Desh Mein Ganga Rehta Hain	Ganga's friend	Hindi film	
2003	Praan Jaye Par Shaan Na Jaye	Venkat	Hindi film	
2004	Saatchya Aat Gharat	Yuvraj		
2004	Savarkhed Ek Gaon	Ishya		
2005	Kaydyacha Bola	Advocate Keshav Kunthalgirikar		
2005	Struggler		Writer	
2006	Khabardar	Mr. More		
2006	Shubhamangal Savadhan	Kotikrao Dhole Patil		
2006	Nana Mama	Mama		
2006	Bagh Haat Dakhvun	Haribhau		
2007	Gadhvacha Lagna	Savala		
2007	Jau Tithe Khau	Mukund		
2007	Tula Shikwin Chaanglach Dhada	Makarand		
2007	Arre... Deva!	Tukaram		
2007	Zabardast	Prof. Kashyap		
2007	Saade Maade Teen	Madan		
2007	Pinjrewaali Muniya	Madan	Bhojpuri film	
2008	Doghat Tisara Ata Sagala Visara	Damodar (Damya)		
2008	Oxygen – Jeev Gudmartoy	Makarand		
2008	Full 3 Dhamaal	Vijay Tofhkhane		
2008	Uladhaal	Sayajirao		
2008	Dum Dum Diga Diga	Gurunath		
2008	De Dhakka	Makarand Suryabhan Jadhav	Zee Chitra Gaurav Puraskar for Best Actor Nominated	
2008	Sasu Numbari Jawai Dus Numbari	Tukaram		
2009	Me Shivajiraje Bhosale Boltoy	Raiba		
2009	Gallit Gondhal, Dillit Mujra	Narayan Wagh		
2009	Goshta Choti Dongraevadhi	Rajaram	Also producer	
2009	Baap Re Baap Dokyala Taap	Yuvraj Kadu Patil		
2009	Nau Mahine Nau Divas	Dr. Shriram		
2009	Sagla Karun Bhagle	Arjun		
2009	Sumbaran	Vasant		
2009	Nishani Dava Angtha	Dukare Guruji		
2010	Manya Sajjana	Manohar Dixit		
2010	Batti Gul Powerful	Kishoranand		
2010	Khurchi Samrat	Malhar Devdas		
2010	Agadbam	Raiba		
2010	Tukya Tukvila Nagya Nachvila	Tukaram		
2010	Hapus	Digambar Kale		
2010	Paradh	Ambadas		
2010	My Friend Ganesha 3	Bala	Hindi film	
2010	Hello! Hum Lallan Bol Rahe Hain	Ganesh	Hindi film	
2011	Davpech	Nilkanth Dhotre		
2011	Guldasta	Rajwardhan Choughule	MFK Award for Favourite Comedian	
2011	Don Ghadicha Dav	Saumitra		
2011	Dambis	Dattu	Also director	
2011	Teecha Baap Tyacha Baap	Aaburao Tanaji Shringarpure		
2012	Teen Bayka Fajiti Aika	Vishwasrao Dhoke	MFK Award for Favourite Comedian	
2012	Baburao La Pakda	Baburao		
2012	Yere Yere Paisa	Dampya		
2012	Pipaani	Popat Jhadbuke		
2012	Mala Ek Chanas Hava	Makarand		
2013	Beed Cha Raaja	Unnamed	Special appearance	
2013	Gadya Aapla Gaon Bara	Nana's son		
2013	We Are On! Houn Jau Dya	Makky		
2013	Dankyavar Danka	Taramati 's love interest		
2013	Angarki	Prof. Bindumadhav		
2013	Zapatlela 2	Makarand Vatvate (Makya)		
2014	Punha Gondhal Punha Mujra	Narayan Wagh		
2014	Anvatt	Sada Kamat		
2015	Gunthamantri	Mantri		
2015	Wanted Bayko No.1	Dinkar		
2015	Sata Lota Pan Sagla Khota	Satyavan		
2016	Shasan	Vishwas		
2016	Kapus Kondyachi Goshta	Lawyer		
2016	Rangaa Patangaa	Jumman		
2016	Nagpur Adhiveshan	Salunkhe		
2017	Thank U Vitthala	Haribhau Waghmare		
2018	Pani Bini	Makarand		
2018	Dr. Tatya Lahane	T. P. Lahane		
2018	Zelya	Zelya's father		
2022	De Dhakka 2	Makarand Suryabhan Jadhav		
2023	Chhapa Kata	Namdev "Namya"		
2023	Yashwant	Pardeshi Guruji		
2024	Ole Aale	Baburao		
2024	Juna Furniture	Chief Minister		
2024	Navardev Bsc. Agri	Bhausaheb		
2024	Rajkaran Gela Mishit	Nathuba	Director	
2024	Ek Daav Bhutacha	Shashikant Deshmukh		
2024	Mushak Aakhyan	Kali		
2026	Punha Ekda Sade Made Teen	Madan		
2026	Ova	Gopal	Released on YouTube	
2026	Tumbadchi Manjula	Karunakaran Guruji		
2026	Mamachya Govyala Jauya			
2026	Dashami	Prabhakar Desai		

=== Web series ===
Year	Serial	Role	Notes
2022	RaanBaazaar	Appa Divekar	
2024	Manvat Murders	Uttamrao Barhate	

=== Television ===
==== Marathi ====
- Bedhund Manachya Lahari
- Tur Tur
- Oon Paus
- Tisra Dola
- Shejaar
- Aamchya Sarkhe Aamhich
- Comedychi Bullet Train
- Naammatra
- Post Office Ughade Aahe

==== Hindi ====
- Tu Tu Main Main (cameo appearance)

=== As a host ===
Makrand was host of the Marathi show Hapta Band in its second season on Zee Marathi. He judged the comedy show Fu Bai Fu on Zee Marathi as well as Maharashtrachi Hasyajatra on Sony Marathi. He was also the host of Marathi show Assal Pahune Irsal Namune on Colors Marathi.
