= Sandra Fruean =

American Samoan footballer and football official

Personal information
- Full name: Sandra Fruean Herrera
- Birth name: Sandra Fruean
- Date of birth: 23 August 1968 (age 58)

Senior career*
Years	Team	Apps	(Gls)
1987–1997	Renegades		
1997–????	PanSa		

International career
1998–2007	American Samoa		
- * Club domestic league appearances and goals

Sandra Fruean Herrera (née Fruean; born 23 August 1968) is a football official and a former footballer from American Samoa. Since September 2016, she has been a member of the FIFA Council. She also is the current Vice President of the Football Federation American Samoa.

== Playing career ==
Fruean is a former national team player of American Samoa. She represented American Samoa in the 1998 OFC qualifier for the FIFA Women's World Cup. Two of her children are also former American Samoa national players, daughter Sandra Ivette Fruean-Sopoaga, and son, Ismael D'Angelo Herrera. Fruean has attended the FIFA Women's World Cup in Germany and has been a member of the FIFA U-17 Women's World Cup since 2012.
