= List of Left Democratic Front (Kerala) members =

List of Left Democratic Front members

Left Democratic Front
- Abbreviation: LDF
- Leader: Pinarayi Vijayan (Leader of the Opposition); T. P. Ramakrishnan (convenor)
- Founders: P. K. Vasudevan Nair; E. M. S. Namboodiripad
- Ideology: Socialism; Marxism; Secularism
- Colours: Red
- Rajya Sabha: 6 / 9
- Lok Sabha: 1 / 20
- Kerala Legislative Assembly: 35 / 140
- Gram Panchayats: 338 / 941
- Block Panchayat: 64 / 152
- District Panchayat: 7 / 14
- Municipalities: 28 / 86
- Municipal Corporation: 1 / 6

The Left Democratic Front (LDF) is a political alliance in the Indian state of Kerala. It has been the official opposition in Kerala Legislative Assembly since May 2026. It is one of the two major political alliances in Kerala, the other being the Indian National Congress–led United Democratic Front, each of which has been in power alternately for the last four decades.

It is led by the Communist Party of India (Marxist) and was founded by P. K. Vasudevan Nair and E. M. S. Namboodiripad in 1979. The LDF first contested the assembly elections in 1980. LDF has won the elections to the State Legislature of Kerala in the years 1980, 1987, 1996, 2006, 2016 and had a historic re-election in 2021 under the leadership of Pinarayi Vijayan. The 2021 election was historic as it marked the first time in Kerala's electoral history that an incumbent government was re-elected to power.

LDF has been in power in the State Legislature of Kerala under E. K. Nayanar (1980–81, 1987–91, 1996–2001), V. S. Achuthanandan (2006–11), Pinarayi Vijayan (2016–2026). E. K. Nayanar served as the Chief Minister of Kerala for 11 years and later became the longest serving Chief Minister of Kerala.

== History ==
The Left Democratic Front first contested the elections in the 1980 Kerala Legislative Assembly election. The parties that contested under the alliance were the Communist Party of India (Marxist), the Communist Party of India, the Indian National Congress (U), the Kerala Congress (M), the Kerala Congress (Pillai Group), the Muslim League (Opposition), and the Revolutionary Socialist Party. The alliance won the election with 93 seats. However, in 1982, Kerala Congress (B), KC(M) and the Indian National Congress (U) joined the United Democratic Front, which led to the resignation of the then-Chief Minister E. K. Nayanar. The Congress (Secular) joined the alliance in 1982. In the 1982 Kerala Legislative Assembly election, the LDF consisted of the Communist Party of India (Marxist), the Communist Party of India, Indian Congress (Socialist), Muslim League (Opposition), and the DSP.

In later years, many new parties aligned with the LDF such as the Indian National League in 2001, the Marxist-Leninist Party of India (Red Flag) in 2003 and the Janata Dal (Secular) in 2009. In the 2010s, the Nationalist Congress Party were brought into the fold in 2010. After decades of being a member in the alliance, the Revolutionary Socialist Party quit the alliance in 2014 as the party was denied the Kollam Lok Sabha constituency in the 2014 Lok Sabha elections. The RSP later joined the UDF the same year. In 2015, the Kerala Congress (B) rejoined LDF by leaving the United Democratic Front. The Janadhipathya Kerala Congress joined the alliance in 2016 through a split from the KC(M).

In 2020, the Kerala Congress (M) severed ties with the United Democratic Front and rejoined the LDF. In 2023, the Loktantrik Janata Dal merged with the Rashtriya Janata Dal, which led to the RJD joining the alliance. In 2024, the Janata Dal (Secular) after its national leadership, led by H. D. Deve Gowda and H. D. Kumaraswamy, formed an alliance with the Bharatiya Janata Party led by the National Democratic Alliance. This led to the merger of the Kerala unit of the Janata Dal Secular to the Indian Socialist Janata Dal on January 17, 2026.

== List of members ==
List of members of the Left Democratic Front
Party	Flag	Year joined	Ideology	Kerala unit leader	Lok Sabha	Rajya Sabha	Kerala Legislative Assembly	Ref.
Communist Party of India (Marxist)		1979	Marxism-Leninism; Socialism; Secularism	M. V. Govindan	1 / 20	3 / 9	26 / 140	
Communist Party of India		1979	Marxism-Leninism	Binoy Viswam	0 / 20	2 / 9	8 / 140	
Kerala Congress (Mani)		1979–1989, 2020–present	Democratic socialism; Manism	Jose K. Mani	0 / 20	1 / 9	0 / 140	
Rashtriya Janata Dal		2023	Democratic socialism; Left-wing populism	M. V. Shreyams Kumar	0 / 20	0 / 9	1 / 140	
Nationalist Congress Party (Sharadchandra Pawar)		2023	Secularism	P. C. Chacko	0 / 20	0 / 9	0 / 140	
Indian Socialist Janata Dal		2026	Democratic socialism	Mathew T. Thomas	0 / 20	0 / 9	0 / 140	
Kerala Congress (B)		1979–1982, 2015–present	Democratic socialism	K. B. Ganesh Kumar	0 / 20	0 / 9	0 / 140	
Indian National League		2001	Secularism; Social justice	Ahamed Devarkovil	0 / 20	0 / 9	0 / 140	
Janadhipathya Kerala Congress		2016	Socialism	Antony Raju	0 / 20	0 / 9	0 / 140	
Revolutionary Socialist Party (Leninist)		2016	Revolutionary socialism	Kovoor Kunjumon	0 / 20	0 / 9	0 / 140	
Congress Socialist Party		2026	Democratic socialism Left-wing nationalism	Kadannappalli Ramachandran	0 / 20	0 / 9	0 / 140	

== Parties that provide outside support ==
List of parties that provide outside support to the Left Democratic Front
Party	Flag	Year joined	Ideology	Kerala unit leader	Lok Sabha	Rajya Sabha	Kerala Legislative Assembly	Ref.
National Secular Conference		2011	Scheduled Castes interests; Secularism	P. T. A. Rahim	0 / 20	0 / 9	0 / 140	
Kerala Congress (Skaria Thomas)		2015	Kerala Congress anti-merger Group	Binoy Joseph	0 / 20	0 / 9	0 / 140	
Marxist-Leninist Party of India (Red Flag)		2003	Communism; Marxism–Leninism	M. S. Jayakumar	0 / 20	0 / 9	0 / 140	
National League (Wahab faction)		2024	Secularism; Social justice	Abdul Wahab	0 / 20	0 / 9	0 / 140	

== Former members ==
Former members of the Left Democratic Front
Party	Flag	Ideology	Year joined	Year left	Reason
Revolutionary Socialist Party		Communism; Marxism–Leninism	1979	2014	Joined United Democratic Front
Kerala Congress		Liberalism; Regionalism	1989	2010	Joined United Democratic Front
Janata Dal (Secular)		Social democracy	2009	2026	Merged with Indian Socialist Janata Dal as the national leadership joined the National Democratic Alliance.
Nationalist Congress Party		Indian liberalism	2010	2023	State unit merged with Nationalist Congress Party – Sharadchandra Pawar.
Janathipathiya Samrakshana Samithy		Communism; Marxism	2013	2021	Joined United Democratic Front
Communist Marxist Party (Aravindakshan)		Marxism; Communism	2014	2019	Merged with CPI(M)
Loktantrik Janata Dal		Socialism; Mulnivasism; Bahujanism	2018	2023	Merged with Rashtriya Janata Dal
Nationalist Congress Party (Secular)		Gandhian socialism; Secularism	2026	2026	Merged to Congress Socialist Party
Congress (Secular)		Gandhian socialism	1982	2026	Merged to Congress Socialist Party

== See also ==
- List of United Democratic Front (Kerala) members
- Left Democratic Front
- United Democratic Front
- National Democratic Alliance
