= Mhatre =

Mhatre is a surname. Notable people with the surname include:

- Abhilasha Mhatre, Indian kabaddi player
- Ayush Mhatre (born 2007), Indian cricketer
- Dnyaneshwar Mhatre, Indian politician
- Manda Vijay Mhatre, Indian politician
- Natasha Mhatre, animal communication researcher at the University of Western Ontario
- Nishita Nirmal Mhatre, Indian judge
- Ravindra Mhatre (c. 1936–1984), Indian diplomat and murder victim
- Rupesh Laxman Mhatre, Indian politician
- Sagar Mhatre, winner of season 1 of the Indian Marathi-language show Indian Idol Marathi
- Sandhya Mhatre, actress in the 2020 Indian Hindi-language film Devi
- Suresh Mhatre, Indian politician and businessman
