= Bhiwandi West Assembly constituency =

Constituency of the Maharashtra legislative assembly in India

Coordinates: 19.256°N 73.020°E

Bhiwandi West
- Constituency No. 136 for the Maharashtra Legislative Assembly

Constituency details
- Country: India
- Region: Western India
- State: Maharashtra
- District: Thane
- Lok Sabha constituency: Bhiwandi
- Established: 2008
- Total electors: 334,053
- Reservation: None

Member of Legislative Assembly
- 15th Maharashtra Legislative Assembly
- Incumbent Mahesh Prabhakar Choughule
- Party: Bharatiya Janata Party
- Elected year: 2019

Bhiwandi West Assembly constituency is one of the 288 Vidhan Sabha (legislative assembly) constituencies of Maharashtra state, western India. This constituency is located in Thane district.

== Geographical scope ==
The constituency comprises parts of Bhiwandi taluka that is parts of Bhiwandi-Nizampur Municipal Corporation namely Ward No 1 to 5, 18 to 35, 51 to 61, Khoni (CT), Shelar (CT), Katai (CT), Karivali (CT).

== List of Members of Legislative Assembly ==
Year	Member	Party
Until 2008: Constituency did not exist
2009	Abdul Rashid Tahir Momin	Samajwadi Party
2014	Mahesh Choughule	Bharatiya Janata Party
2019	Mahesh Choughule	Bharatiya Janata Party
2024	Mahesh Choughule	Bharatiya Janata Party

== Election results ==
=== Assembly Election 2024 ===
2024 Maharashtra Legislative Assembly election : Bhiwandi West
Party	Candidate	Votes	%	±%
BJP	Mahesh Prabhakar Choughule	70,172	38.87	▼4.09
SP	Azmi Riyaj Muqeemuddin	38,879	21.54	New
Independent	Vilas Raghunath Patil	31,579	17.49	New
INC	Dayanand Motiram Choraghe	21,980	12.18	▼8.53
AIMIM	Waris Pathan	15,800	8.75	New
NOTA	None of the Above	1,072	0.59	▼0.78
Margin of victory		31,293	17.34	▲6.45
Turnout		1,81,580	54.36	▲4.38
Total valid votes		1,80,508		
Registered electors		3,34,053		▲21.10
BJP hold		Swing	▼4.09	

=== Assembly Election 2019 ===
2019 Maharashtra Legislative Assembly election : Bhiwandi West
Party	Candidate	Votes	%	±%
BJP	Mahesh Prabhakar Choughule	58,857	42.97	▲8.76
AIMIM	Mohd. Khalid (Guddu)	43,945	32.08	New
INC	Mohd. Khan Shoeb (Guddu)	28,359	20.70	▼10.83
MNS	Nagesh Shankar Mukadam	2,600	1.90	New
VBA	Bonde Suhas Dhananjay	2,171	1.58	New
NOTA	None of the Above	1,886	1.38	▲0.73
Margin of victory		14,912	10.89	▲8.21
Turnout		1,38,871	50.34	▲0.41
Total valid votes		1,36,980		
Registered electors		2,75,855		▲9.41
BJP hold		Swing	▲8.76	

=== Assembly Election 2014 ===
2014 Maharashtra Legislative Assembly election : Bhiwandi West
Party	Candidate	Votes	%	±%
BJP	Mahesh Prabhakar Choughule	42,483	34.21	New
INC	Mohd. Khan Shoeb (Guddu)	39,157	31.53	▲7.34
SS	Manoj Motiram Katekar	20,106	16.19	▲0.64
NCP	Abdul Rashid Momin	16,131	12.99	New
AIMIM	Sheikh Jaki Abdul Rashid	4,686	3.77	New
NOTA	None of the Above	799	0.64	New
Margin of victory		3,326	2.68	▲1.04
Turnout		1,24,980	49.57	▲5.16
Total valid votes		1,24,176		
Registered electors		2,52,131		▲7.58
BJP gain from SP		Swing	▲4.38	

=== Assembly Election 2009 ===
2009 Maharashtra Legislative Assembly election : Bhiwandi West
Party	Candidate	Votes	%	±%
SP	Abdul Rashid Momin	30,825	29.83	New
Independent	Sainath (Bhau) Rangarao Pawar	29,134	28.19	New
INC	Jawed Gulam Mohd. Dalvi	24,998	24.19	New
SS	Suresh Mhatre	16,074	15.55	New
BSP	Obaidullah Ekhlakh Ahmed	846	0.82	New
Margin of victory		1,691	1.64	
Turnout		1,03,371	44.11	
Total valid votes		1,03,343		
Registered electors		2,34,374		
SP win (new seat)				
