= Rupesh =

Rupesh is a masculine given name. Notable people with the name include:

- Rupesh Amin, English cricketer
- Rupesh Gowala, Indian politician
- Rupesh Jaiswal, Nepali chess player
- Rupesh KC, Nepali football midfielder
- Arun Rupesh Maini, English YouTuber
- Rupesh Laxman Mhatre, Indian politician
- Rupesh Kumar Panigrahi, Indian politician
- Rupesh Paul, Indian film director
- Rupesh Shah, Indian billiards player
- Rupesh Kumar Singh, India-based journalist
- Rupesh Kumar K. T., Indian badminton player
