= List of Indian National Developmental Inclusive Alliance members =

The Indian National Developmental Inclusive Alliance (INDIA), is a big tent electoral alliance and parliamentary group of political parties in India led by the Indian National Congress. It is a coalition of 23 political parties in India that took on the ruling National Democratic Alliance led by the Bharatiya Janata Party in the 2024 Indian general election.

== Member Parties ==
The Indian National Developmental Inclusive Alliance comprises a diverse range of political parties from across India. The member parties of the alliance are:

Party		Leader		Logo/Flag	Lok Sabha	Rajya Sabha	State Assemblies	State Councils	Base
INC	Indian National Congress		Mallikarjun Kharge		98	30	662	56	National Party
SP	Samajwadi Party		Akhilesh Yadav		37	4	104	12	Uttar Pradesh
MAITC	Mamata All India Trinamool Congress		Mamata Banerjee		8	9	86	–	West Bengal, Meghalaya,Assam
SS(UBT)	Shiv Sena (Uddhav Balasaheb Thackeray)		Uddhav Thackeray		3	1	20	5	Maharashtra
NCP–SP	Nationalist Congress Party – Sharadchandra Pawar		Sharad Pawar		8	1	10	3	Maharashtra, Kerala
CPI(M)	Communist Party of India (Marxist)		M. A. Baby		4	3	43	–	National Party
RJD	Rashtriya Janata Dal		Lalu Prasad Yadav		4	3	30	17	Bihar, Jharkhand
JMM	Jharkhand Mukti Morcha		Hemant Soren		3	3	34	–	Jharkhand
IUML	Indian Union Muslim League		K. M. Kader Mohideen		3	2	24	–	Kerala and Tamil Nadu
JKNC	Jammu and Kashmir National Conference		Farooq Abdullah		2	3	41	–	Jammu and Kashmir
CPI	Communist Party of India		D. Raja		2	2	11	1	Kerala, Tamil Nadu, Manipur
KEC(M)	Kerala Congress (M)		Jose K. Mani		0	1	0	–	Kerala
VCK	Viduthalai Chiruthaigal Katchi		Thol. Thirumavalavan		2	–	2	–	Tamil Nadu
RSP	Revolutionary Socialist Party		Manoj Bhattacharya		1	–	3	–	Kerala
CPI(ML)L	Communist Party of India (Marxist–Leninist) Liberation		Dipankar Bhattacharya		2	–	4	1	Bihar
KEC	Kerala Congress		P. J. Joseph		1	–	7	–	Kerala
PWPI	Peasants and Workers Party of India		Jayant Prabhakar Patil		–	–	1		Maharashtra
AIFB	All India Forward Bloc		G. Devarajan		–	–	–	–	West Bengal
BAP	Bharat Adivasi Party		Rajkumar Roat		1	0	5	0	Rajasthan, Madhya Pradesh, Gujarat
GFP	Goa Forward Party		Vijai Sardesai		–	–	1	–	Goa
RLP	Rashtriya Loktantrik Party		Hanuman Beniwal		1	–	–	–	Rajasthan
TVK	Tamilaga Vettri Kazhagam		C. Joseph Vijay		–	–	111	–	Tamil Nadu and Puducherry
Independent	Independent		Vishal Patil; Mohmad Haneefa; Pappu Yadav; Kapil Sibal		3	1	0	0	All India
Indian National Developmental Inclusive Alliance		(Chairperson)	Mallikarjun Kharge		184	63	1221	97	INDIA

== Former members ==
Party		Base State	Year of withdrawal	Reference(s)
AD(K)	Apna Dal (Kamerawadi)	Uttar Pradesh	2024	
RLD	Rashtriya Lok Dal	Uttar Pradesh	2024	
JD(U)	Janata Dal (United)	Bihar	2024	
HAM(S)	Hindustani Awam Morcha	Bihar	2023	
AAP	Aam Aadmi Party	National Party	2025	
DMK	Dravida Munnetra Kazhagam	Tamil Nadu; Puducherry	2026	
SS(UBT)	SS(UBT)	Maharashtra	2024	Due to over consequences between the CM post

== See also ==
- List of National Democratic Alliance members
- List of Left Democratic Front (Kerala) members
