= Kapil Patil =

Indian politician

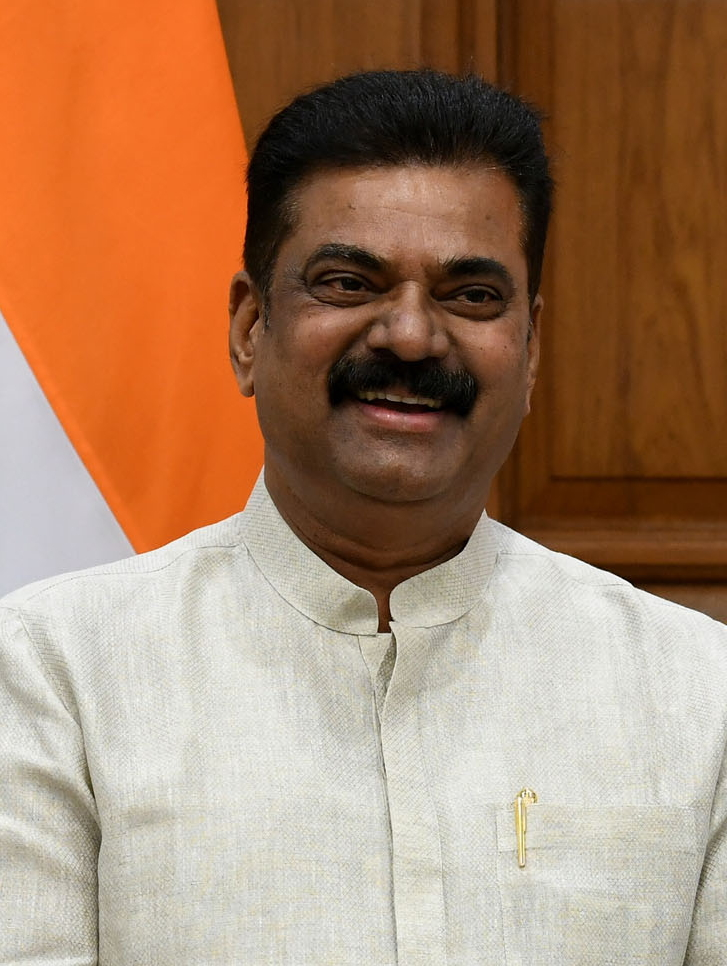

Minister of State for Panchayati Raj
- In office 7 July 2021 – 11 June 2024
- Prime Minister: Narendra Modi
- Minister: Giriraj Singh

Member of Parliament, Lok Sabha
- In office 23 May 2014 – 4 June 2024
- Preceded by: Suresh Kashinath Taware
- Succeeded by: Suresh Mhatre
- Constituency: Bhiwandi

Personal details
- Born: 5 March 1961 (age 65) Anjoor Dive, Thane district, Maharashtra
- Party: Bharatiya Janata Party (BJP)
- Spouse: Minal Patil
- Children: 2
- Profession: Politician

Kapil Moreshwar Patil (born 5 March 1961) is politician from Bhiwandi in Maharashtra, India. He became the Union Minister of State in the Ministry of Panchayati Raj during Prime Minister Narendra Modi's ministry reshuffle on 7 July 2021. He belongs to the Aagri community of Maharashtra.

== Education ==
Patil graduation with a B.A. from Mumbai University in 1984-1985.

== Political career ==
Patil contested 2014 Lok Sabha elections from Bhiwandi Lok Sabha constituency as BJP /NDA candidate, after switching over from the NCP.

He was sworn in as a union minister in Prime Minister Narendra Modi's ministry reshuffle on 7 July 2021. He is the Minister of State in the Ministry of Panchayati Raj.

=== Positions held ===
He was Chairman of Thane District Co-operative Bank. He also worked as President of Thane Zilla Parishad. He moved from Nationalist Congress Party to Bharatiya Janata Party in March 2014.

May 2014: Elected to 16th Lok Sabha 1 September 2014 onwards: Member, Standing Committee on Urban Development.
