= Narendra Pawar =

Indian politician (born 1969)

Narendra Baburao Pawar

Member of Maharashtra Legislative Assembly
- In office October 2014 – October 2019
- Preceded by: Prakash Bhoir
- Succeeded by: Vishwanath Bhoir
- Constituency: Kalyan West

Personal details
- Born: 27 August 1969 (age 56) Kalyan, Maharashtra, India
- Party: Bharatiya Janata Party
- Spouse: Hema Pawar
- Children: Himanshu Pawar (son); Paritosh Pawar (son)
- Education: Diploma in Civil Engineering
- Occupation: Politician, Construction Business
- Website: mahabjp.org

Narendra Pawar (born 27 August 1969) is a politician from the Bharatiya Janata Party. Pawar was elected to the Maharashtra Legislative Assembly from the Kalyan West (Vidhan Sabha constituency) in 2014. He is a first term member of the Maharashtra Legislative Assembly.

== Early life and education ==
Pawar's father, Baburao Pawar was an employee of Kalyan-Dombivli Municipal Corporation, residing in Kalyan. Since childhood, Pawar has been a member of Rashtriya Swayamsevak Sangh. Pawar completed his Diploma in Civil Engineering. During his student years, he was active member of RSS inspired Akhil Bharatiya Vidyarthi Parishad. He worked for seven years as a full-time worker for the Akhil Bharatiya Vidyarthi Parishad between 1993 and 2000.

== Political career ==
In 2005 he was elected as a corporator in Kalyan-Dombivli Municipal Corporation.Then he served as Deputy Mayor of Kalyan-Dombivli Municipal Corporation for period 2008 – 2010.

== Positions ==
=== ABVP ===
- General Secretary – Maharashtra.

=== Within BJP ===
- Secretary Kalyan (W)
- President Kalyan (W), 2003
- Prabhari of Bharatiya Janata Yuva Morcha, Maharashtra
- President Kalyan District 2013 – 2015
- Secretary Maharashtra 2015 – present
- In charge of Bhiwandi (Lok Sabha constituency) – 2019

=== Municipal Corporation ===
- 2005 – 2008: Corporator Kalyan-Dombivli Municipal Corporation
- 2008 – 2010: Dy. Mayor Kalyan-Dombivli Municipal Corporation

=== Legislative ===
- 2014 – 2019: Member of Maharashtra Legislative Assembly.

Pawar lost his seat in the 2019 assembly election. Since he was denied candidacy by the BJP, he stood as a rebel independent candidate but lost the election to the Shivsena candidate.

=== Other Positions ===
- Director of Jankalyan Sahkari Bank
- President of Jan Nidhi Bank
- President Kalyan Vikas Pratishthan
- Member of Ram Mandir Trust
- Member of Paryavaran Manch.

== Achievements, Contribution & Initiatives ==
- Planned approximately 60,000 number of trees, in & around Kalyan city.
- Successful implementation of 'Jalyukt Shivar Abhiyan' in 6 villages of Jalna, Maharashtra.
- Spreading awareness & implementing Central as well as State Government Policies / Schemes, so that people will get maximum benefit out of it, like Mudra, CM Relief Fund etc.
- Knowing the importance of Indian Culture & to sustain the same, taken initiatives in Rangoli Competition in Diwali & Eco friendly Ganapati festival.
- Knowing that, Youth is face of our nation, helping them for enhancing their career by organizing various events / activities.
- Organized Biggest Public marriage function for farmers Children, at Jalna, Maharashtra where 551 couples got married.
