= Bhiwandi Lok Sabha constituency =

Parliament constituency in Maharashtra

Coordinates: 19.3°N 73.1°E

Bhiwandi Lok Sabha
- Lok Sabha constituency
- Bhiwandi Lok Sabha Constituency map

Constituency details
- Country: India
- Region: Western India
- State: Maharashtra
- Assembly constituencies: Bhiwandi Rural; Shahapur; Bhiwandi West; Bhiwandi East; Kalyan West; Murbad
- Established: 1952
- Reservation: None

Member of Parliament
- 18th Lok Sabha
- Incumbent Suresh G. Mhatre
- Party: NCP-SP
- Alliance: INDIA
- Elected year: 2024
- Preceded by: Kapil Patil

Bhiwandi Lok Sabha constituency is one of the 48 Lok Sabha (parliamentary) constituencies of Maharashtra state in western India. This constituency came into existence on 19 February 2008 as a part of the implementation of the Presidential notification based on the recommendations of the Delimitation Commission of India constituted on 12 July 2002.

== Assembly segments ==
Presently, Bhiwandi Lok Sabha constituency comprises six Vidhan Sabha (legislative assembly) segments. These segments are:

#	Name	District	Member	Party	Leading (in 2024)
134	Bhiwandi Rural (ST)	Thane	Shantaram More	SHS	BJP
135	Shahapur (ST)	Thane	Daulat Daroda	NCP	IND
136	Bhiwandi West	Thane	Mahesh Choughule	BJP	NCP-SP
137	Bhiwandi East	Thane	Rais Shaikh	SP	NCP-SP
138	Kalyan West	Thane	Vishwanath Bhoir	SHS	BJP
139	Murbad	Thane	Kisan Kathore	BJP	BJP

== Members of Parliament ==
Year	Name	Party
1962	Yashwantrao Mukne	Indian National Congress
1967	Sonubhau Baswant	Indian National Congress
1971	Vaijnath Dhamankar	Indian National Congress
Constituency abolished
2009	Suresh Taware	Indian National Congress
2014	Kapil Patil	Bharatiya Janata Party
2019	Kapil Patil	Bharatiya Janata Party
2024	Suresh G. Mhatre	Nationalist Congress Party (Sharadchandra Pawar)

== Election results ==
=== 2024 ===
2024 Indian general elections: Bhiwandi
Party	Candidate	Votes	%	±%
NCP-SP	Suresh G. Mhatre	499,464	39.85	New
BJP	Kapil Patil	4,33,343	34.57	▼17.52
Independent	Nilesh Sambare (Appa)	2,31,417	18.46	New
NRSP	Kanchan Vinayak Vakhare	24,625	1.96	N/A
NOTA	None of the Above	9,347	0.75	▼0.88
Majority		66,121	5.28	▼10.27
Turnout		12,54,778	60.11	▲6.91
NCP-SP gain from BJP		Swing		

=== 2019 ===
2019 Indian general elections: Bhiwandi
Party	Candidate	Votes	%	±%
BJP	Kapil Patil	523,583	52.09	
INC	Suresh Kashinath Taware	3,67,254	36.54	
VBA	Arun Damodar Sawant	51,455	5.12	
Independent	Nitesh Raghunath Jadhav	20,697	2.06	
NOTA	None of the above	16,397	1.63	
Majority		1,56,329	15.55	▲3.05
Turnout		10,05,605	53.20	+1.58
BJP hold		Swing		

=== 2014 ===
2014 Indian general elections: Bhiwandi
Party	Candidate	Votes	%	±%
BJP	Kapil Patil	411,070	46.95	
INC	Patil Vishwanath Ramchandra	3,01,620	34.45	
MNS	Suresh G. Mhatre	93,647	10.70	
BSP	Ansari Mumtaz Abdul Satar	14,068	1.61	
Majority		1,09,450	12.50	▲5.42
Turnout		8,75,804	51.62	▲12.33
BJP gain from INC		Swing		

=== 2009 ===
2009 Indian general elections: Bhiwandi
Party	Candidate	Votes	%	±%
INC	Suresh Taware	182,789	31.29	
BJP	Jagannath Patil	1,41,425	24.21	
MNS	Devraj Mhatre	1,07,090	18.33	
Independent	Vishwanath Patil	77,769	13.32	
SP	R. R. Patil	32,767	5.61	
Majority		41,364	7.08	
Turnout		5,84,263	39.29	
INC hold		Swing		

== See also ==
- Thane district
- List of constituencies of the Lok Sabha
