= List of National Democratic Alliance members =

Indian national Parliamentary group

The National Democratic Alliance (NDA) is an Indian national Parliamentary group in the country of India. It is the Bharatiya Janata Party-led alliance founded by the former Prime Minister of India Atal Bihari Vajpayee in May 15, 1998. The NDA faced the general elections of 1998 and 1999 by having Atal Bihari Vajpayee as the prime ministerial candidate, won both elections, and formed the government. In 2004 under the leadership of Atal Bihari Vajpayee and 2009, under the leadership of L. K. Advani as the prime ministerial candidate and lost both elections. In 2014, 2019 and 2024 the alliance had Narendra Modi as its prime ministerial candidate, won the elections with a great majority, and formed the government.

== List of members ==
Political party	Abbr	Flag	Election symbol	Leader	Seats		Base
Political party	Abbr	Flag	Election symbol	Leader	Lok Sabha	Rajya Sabha	Base
National party							Base
Bharatiya Janata Party	BJP			Nitin Nabin	241 / 543	117 / 245	National party
National People's Party	NPP			Conrad Sangma	0 / 543	1 / 245	National party
State party
Telugu Desam Party	TDP			Nara Chandrababu Naidu	16 / 543	4 / 245	Andhra Pradesh; Telangana
Janata Dal (United)	JDU			Nitish Kumar	12 / 543	4 / 245	Bihar
Lok Janshakti Party (Ram Vilas)	LJPRV			Chirag Paswan	5 / 543	0 / 245	Bihar; Jharkhand; Nagaland
All India Anna Dravida Munnetra Kazhagam	AIADMK			Edappadi K. Palaniswami	0 / 543	4 / 245	Tamil Nadu; Puducherry
All Jharkhand Students Union	AJSUP			Sudesh Mahto	1 / 543	0 / 245	Jharkhand
All India N.R. Congress	AINRC			N. Rangasamy	0 / 543	0 / 245	Puducherry
Apna Dal (Soneylal)	ADS			Anupriya Patel	1 / 543	0 / 245	Uttar Pradesh
Asom Gana Parishad	AGP			Atul Bora	1 / 543	1 / 245	Assam
Hill State People's Democratic Party	HSPDP			K. P. Pangniang	0 / 543	0 / 245	Meghalaya
Indigenous People's Front of Tripura	IPFT			Prem Kumar Reang	0 / 543	0 / 245	Tripura
Janasena Party	JSP			Konidela Pawan Kalyan	2 / 543	1 / 245	Andhra Pradesh
Janata Dal (Secular)	JDS		Janata Dal Election Symbol	H. D. Deve Gowda	2 / 543	0 / 245	Arunachal Pradesh; Karnataka
Maharashtrawadi Gomantak Party	MGP			Sudin Dhavalikar	0 / 543	0 / 245	Goa
Naga People's Front	NPF			Neiphiu Rio	0 / 543	0 / 245	Manipur; Nagaland
Nationalist Congress Party	NCP			Sunetra Pawar	1 / 543	4 / 245	Maharashtra; Nagaland
People's Party of Arunachal	PPA			Nabam Vivek	0 / 245	0 / 245	Arunachal Pradesh
Shiv Sena	SHS			Eknath Shinde	13 / 543	2 / 245	Maharashtra
Sikkim Krantikari Morcha	SKM			Prem Singh Tamang	1 / 543	0 / 245	Sikkim
Tipra Motha Party	TMP			Pradyot Bikram Manikya Deb Barma	0 / 543	0 / 245	Tripura
Bodoland People's Front	BPF			Hagrama Mohilary	0 / 543	0 / 245	Assam
Unrecognised Party
Nationalist Citizens Party of India	NPCI			Jyoti Prokash Chatterjee	20 / 543	0 / 245	West Bengal
Amma Makkal Munnettra Kazagam	AMMK			T. T. V. Dhinakaran	0 / 543	0 / 245	Tamil Nadu
Pattali Makkal Katchi	PMK			Anbumani Ramadoss	0 / 543	1 / 245	Tamil Nadu
Bharath Dharma Jana Sena	BDJS			Thushar Vellappally	0 / 543	0 / 245	Kerala
Twenty 20	T20			Sabu M. Jacob	0 / 543	0 / 245	Kerala
Kerala Kamaraj Congress	KKC			Vishnupuram Chandrasekharan	0 / 543	0 / 245	Kerala
Gorkha National Liberation Front	GNLF			Mann Ghising	0 / 543	0 / 245	West Bengal
Haryana Lokhit Party	HLP			Gopal Kanda	0 / 543	0 / 245	Haryana
Hindustani Awam Morcha	HAM			Jitan Ram Manjhi	1 / 543	0 / 245	Bihar
Jan Surajya Shakti	JSS			Vinay Kore	0 / 543	0 / 245	Maharashtra
NISHAD Party	NP			Sanjay Nishad	0 / 543	0 / 245	Uttar Pradesh
Puthiya Needhi Katchi	PNK			A. C. Shanmugam	0 / 543	0 / 245	Tamil Nadu
Rashtriya Lok Dal	RLD			Jayant Chaudhary	2 / 543	1 / 245	Uttar Pradesh; Rajasthan
Rashtriya Lok Morcha	RLM			Upendra Kushwaha	0 / 543	1 / 245	Bihar
Rashtriya Samaj Paksha	RSP			Mahadev Jankar	0 / 543	0 / 245	Maharashtra
Republican Party of India (Athawale)	RPIA			Ramdas Athawale	0 / 543	1 / 245	Maharashtra
Suheldev Bharatiya Samaj Party	SBSP			Om Prakash Rajbhar	0 / 543	0 / 245	Uttar Pradesh
Rashtriya Yuva Swabhiman Party	RYSP			Ravi Rana	0 / 245	0 / 245	Maharashtra
Rajarshi Shahu Vikas Aghadi	RSVA			Rajendra Patil Yadravkar	0 / 245	0 / 245	Maharashtra
Rabha Hasong Joutha Mancha	RHJM				0 / 245	0 / 245	Assam
Sanmilita Gana Shakti	SGS				0 / 245	0 / 245	Assam
Indhiya Jananayaga Katchi	IJK			T. R. Paarivendhar	0 / 543	0 / 245	Tamil Nadu
TOTAL					318 / 543	150 / 245	

== Past members ==
Party	Abbr.	Base	Year joined NDA	Year left NDA	Reason
United Democratic Party (Meghalaya)	UDP	Meghalaya		2026	left the alliance after defection of 11 out of 12 MLAs
Tamizhaga Makkal Munnetra Kazhagam	TMMK	Tamil Nadu	2019	2026	left the alliance
Tamil Maanila Congress (Moopanar)	TMC(M)	Tamil Nadu	2019	2026	left the alliance without any friction or tension rather simply to expand their own individual vote-base
United People's Party Liberal	UPPL	Assam	2020	2026	Difference over Seat Agreement
Kerala Congress Democratic	KCD	Kerala	2024	2025	Merger With AITC
Rashtriya Lok Janshakti Party	RLJP	Bihar	2021	2025	
Janadhipathya Rashtriya Sabha	JRP	Kerala	2016	2025	Joined UDF
Jannayak Janta Party	JJP	Haryana	2019	2024	Disagreement over seat sharing for Lok Sabha elections
All India Samathuva Makkal Katchi	AISMK	Tamil Nadu	2019	2024	Merged with BJP
Shiromani Akali Dal (Sanyukt)	SAD(S)	Punjab	2022	2024	Merge into SAD
Puthiya Tamilagam	PT	Tamil Nadu	2021	2024	Allied with AIADMK
Mizo National Front	MNF	Mizoram	2014	2023	
Kuki People's Alliance	KPA	Manipur	2022	2023	Manipur Violence
People's Democratic Front	PDF	Meghalaya		2023	Merger with NPP
Goa Forward Party	GFP	Goa	2017	2021	Allied with INC
Desiya Murpokku Dravida Kazhagam	DMDK	Tamil Nadu	2019	2021	Left Alliance Over Seat Sharing Disagreement
Gorkha Janmukti Morcha	GJM			2020	
Rashtriya Loktantrik Party	RLP	Rajasthan	2019	2020	
Shiromani Akali Dal	SAD	Punjab	1998	2020	Farmers Law
Jammu and Kashmir Peoples Democratic Party	JKPDP	Jammu and Kashmir	2014	2018	Support withdrawn by BJP
Haryana Janhit Congress (BL)	HJCBL	Haryana	2014	2014	Merged with INC
Marumalarchi Dravida Munnetra Kazhagam	MDMK	Tamil Nadu	2006	2014	
Janata Party	JP			2013	Merged with BJP
Jharkhand Mukti Morcha	JMM	Jharkhand	2009	2013	Allied with INC
Ladakh Union Territory Front	LUTF	Jammu and Kashmir		2010	Merged with BJP
Uttarakhand Kranti Dal	UKD	Uttarakhand		2010	
Indian National Lok Dal	INLD	Haryana	2008	2009	
Biju Janata Dal	BJD	Odisha	1998	2009	
All India Trinamool Congress	AITC	West Bengal	2003	2006	
Indian Federal Democratic Party	IFDP	Kerala	2004	2005	Merged with the Kerala Congress
Lok Shakti	LS	Karnataka	1998	2003	Merged with Janata Dal (United)
Samata Party	SP	National Party	1996	2003	Merger with Janata Dal (United)
Dravida Munnetra Kazhagam	DMK	Tamil Nadu	1999	2002	
Jammu & Kashmir National Conference	JKNC	Jammu and Kashmir	1998	2002	
Haryana Vikas Party	HVP	Haryana	1996	1999	

== See also ==
- List of Left Democratic Front (Kerala) members
- List of Indian National Developmental Inclusive Alliance members
