= Rohini Balakrishnan =

Indian bioacoustics expert

- Citizenship: Indian
- Education: Tata Institute of Fundamental Research
- Scientific career
- Fields: Animal communication, bioacoustics
- Workplaces: Indian Institute of Science, Bangalore
- Doctoral advisor: Veronica Rodrigues
- Doctoral students: Natasha Mhatre
- Website: http://ces.iisc.ernet.in/rohini/

Rohini Balakrishnan is an Indian bioacoustics expert. She is a senior Professor and Chair of the Centre for Ecological Sciences at the Indian Institute of Science (IISc), Bengaluru. Her research focuses on animal behavior through the lens of animal communication and bioacoustics.

== Education and career ==
Rohini Balakrishnan has a bachelor's degree in Biology and a Master's in Zoology. She received her PhD in behavior genetics in 1991 from the Tata Institute of Fundamental Research (TIFR) in Mumbai, India. She was the first Ph.D. student of Veronica Rodrigues, an Indian geneticist. She then moved into the field of behavioral ecology, studying acoustic communication in animals and carried out postdoctoral research at McGill University, Canada, from 1993 to 1996, followed by a second postdoc at the University of Erlangen, Germany (1996-1998). She joined IISc, Bangalore in 1998 where she is currently Professor and Chair of the Centre for Ecological Sciences.

== Research ==
Balakrishnan's current research is aimed at understanding the causes and consequences of animal behavior using acoustic communication. Her lab studies behavior and the ecological pressures that shape behavior in several field sites located in the tropical forests of southern India. This work is primarily focused on crickets and bats in the Kudremukh National Park, elephants in Mudumalai Wildlife Sanctuary and songbirds at the Biligiri Rangaswamy Temple Sanctuary. Her lab was the first to study vocal communication in the greater racket-tailed drongo. Using acoustic communication and behavior, her research explores several themes: signal mechanics and physiology of the sound-producing cricket and the auditory behavior of the receiving insect. Her work also looks at the foraging strategies and predator-prey interactions as well as reproductive choices and mate selection. In addition to research, she is also interested in developing and validating databases of acoustic signals of various species to facilitate identification. This enables periodic biodiversity monitoring using an automated recorder installed in an environment allowing for non-invasive sampling. Her team has built libraries of over 200 elephant calls and recording over 90 species of birds.

== Legacy ==
Two species of cricket discovered in Mexico and in Kerala, India have been named Oecanthus rohiniae and Teleogryllus rohini in her honor. Balakrishnan has also discovered several new species of crickets including Prozvenella bangalorensis at the IISc campus in Bangalore.

== Publications ==
- Deb, Rittik; Modak, Sambita; Balakrishnan, Rohini (2020). "Baffling: A condition-dependent alternative mate attraction strategy using self-made tools in tree crickets". Proceedings of the Royal Society B: Biological Sciences. 287 (1941). bioRxiv 10.1101/2020.05.06.080143. doi:10.1098/rspb.2020.2229. PMC 7779502. PMID 33323074.
- Torsekar, Viraj R.; Balakrishnan, Rohini; Gasparini, Clelia (2020). "Sex differences in alternative reproductive tactics in response to predation risk in tree crickets". Functional Ecology. 34 (11): 2326–2337. Bibcode:2020FuEco..34.2326T. doi:10.1111/1365-2435.13652.
- Buxton, Rachel T.; Agnihotri, Samira; Robin, V. V.; Goel, Anurag; Balakrishnan, Rohini (2018). "Acoustic indices as rapid indicators of avian diversity in different land-use types in an Indian biodiversity hotspot". Journal of Ecoacoustics. 2: 1. doi:10.22261/jea.gwpzvd.
- Rajaraman, Kaveri; Godthi, Vamsy; Pratap, Rudra; Balakrishnan, Rohini (2015). "A novel acoustic-vibratory multimodal duet". Journal of Experimental Biology. 218 (Pt 19) jeb.122911. doi:10.1242/jeb.122911. PMID 26254322.
- Balakrishnan, Rohini (2005). "Species Concepts, Species Boundaries and Species Identification: A View from the Tropics". Systematic Biology. 54 (4): 689–693. doi:10.1080/10635150590950308. PMID 16126664.
- Balakrishnan, Rohini; Pollack, Gerald S. (1996). "Recognition of courtship song in the field cricket, Teleogryllus oceanicus". Animal Behaviour. 51 (2): 353–366. Bibcode:1996AnBeh..51..353B. doi:10.1006/anbe.1996.0034.
- Balakrishnan, Rohini; Pollack, Gerald S. (1997). "The Role of Antennal Sensory Cues in Female Responses to Courting Males in the Cricket Teleogryllus Oceanicus". Journal of Experimental Biology. 200 (3): 511–522. Bibcode:1997JExpB.200..511B. doi:10.1242/jeb.200.3.511. PMID 9318192.
