= Oecanthus mhatreae =

Scientific classification
- Kingdom: Animalia
- Phylum: Arthropoda
- Clade: Pancrustacea
- Class: Insecta
- Order: Orthoptera
- Suborder: Ensifera
- Family: Oecanthidae
- Tribe: Oecanthini
- Genus: Oecanthus
- Species: O. mhatreae

Binomial name
- Oecanthus mhatreae Collins, 2021

Species of cricket

Oecanthus mhatreae, commonly known as the Otomí tree cricket, is a species of tree cricket in the family Oecanthidae. It is found in Querétaro, Mexico. Its common name comes from the indigenous Otomi people who are native to the Mexican Plateau region, and its scientific name was given in honour of Natasha Mhatre, a noted Indian Biologist and Professor at University of Western Ontario in Canada.
