= List of United Democratic Front (Kerala) members =

List of United Democratic Front members

The United Democratic Front (UDF) is a political alliance in the Indian state of Kerala. It is led by Indian National Congress and was founded in 1980. The UDF first contested the assembly elections in 1980 but lost to the LDF in that year. UDF first won the elections to the State Legislature of Kerala under the leadership of K. Karunakaran in 1982.

UDF has been in power in the State Legislature of Kerala under K. Karunakaran (1982–87), K. Karunakaran and A. K. Antony (1991–96), A. K. Antony and Oommen Chandy,(2001–06), Oommen Chandy (2011–16) and V. D. Satheesan (2026–present).

== Current members ==
Party	Flag	Ideology	Kerala Unit Leader	Lok Sabha	Rajya Sabha	Kerala Legislative Assembly
Indian National Congress		Liberalism; Social democracy; Secularism; Civic nationalism; Big tent	Sunny Joseph	14 / 20	1 / 9	63 / 140
Indian Union Muslim League		Islamic democracy; Liberal conservatism	Sadiq Ali Thangal	2 / 20	2 / 20	22 / 140
Kerala Congress		Liberalism; Regionalism	P. J. Joseph	1 / 20	0 / 9	7 / 140
Revolutionary Socialist Party		Communism; Revolutionary socialism; Marxism–Leninism	Shibu Baby John	1 / 20	0 / 9	3 / 140
Kerala Congress (Jacob)		Secularism; Socialism; Democracy	Anoop Jacob	0 / 20	0 / 9	1 / 140
Kerala Democratic Party		Liberalism	Mani C. Kappan	0 / 20	0 / 9	1 / 140
Communist Marxist Party		Communism; Marxism	C. P. John	0 / 20	0 / 9	1 / 140
Revolutionary Marxist Party of India		Communism; Marxism-Leninism	N. Venu	0 / 20	0 / 9	1 / 140
All India Forward Bloc		Socialism; Marxism; Left-wing nationalism	T. Manoj Kumar	0 / 20	0 / 9	0 / 140
Janathipathiya Samrakshana Samithy		Communism; Marxism	A. N. Rajan Babu	0 / 20	0 / 9	0 / 140

== Associate Members ==
Party	Flag	Leader	Ref
Janadhipathya Rashtriya Sabha		C. K. Janu	
All India Trinamool Congress (rebel)		P. V. Anvar	
Kerala Pravasi Association		Aswani Nambarambath	

== See also ==
- List of Left Democratic Front (Kerala) members
- Left Democratic Front
- United Democratic Front
- National Democratic Alliance
