= Veronica Rodrigues =

Kenyan-born Indian biologist

- Born: 1953; Nairobi, Kenya
- Died: 10 November 2010 (aged 56–57)
- Education: Trinity College Dublin; Tata Institute of Fundamental Research
- Scientific career
- Fields: developmental biology, genetics, neuroscience
- Workplaces: Tata Institute of Fundamental Research, Mumbai; National Centre for Biological Sciences, Bengaluru
- Doctoral advisor: Obaid Siddiqi
- Website: https://www.ncbs.res.in/former-faculty/veronica

Veronica Filomena Rodrigues (1953 – 10 November 2010) was a Kenyan-born Indian biologist. Veronica completed a B.A with honors in Microbiology from Trinity College Dublin. After being inspired by the work of Obaid Siddiqi and his co-workers, she moved to India to pursue her Ph.D. While doing her PhD, considering her exceptional work, she was offered a permanent faculty position at TIFR. She also served as a senior professor at the National Centre for Biological Sciences, Bangalore. In 2004 she received the Senior National Woman Bioscientist Award. She died in 2010 after suffering from breast cancer for five years.

== Life ==
=== Early life ===
Veronica was born in a Goan immigrant family living in Nairobi, Kenya in 1953. She completed her school education in Nairobi and then entered Makerere University in Kampala for higher education but due to turmoil in the region moved to Trinity College Dublin.

=== Education and career ===
Veronica had to leave Makerere University in Uganda owing to turmoil in the country. She eventually ended up getting a scholarship to study at Trinity College Dublin. She obtained a B.A. with Honours in Microbiology in 1976. She moved to India to pursue her PhD from Tata Institute of Fundamental Research (TIFR), Mumbai in 1977 under the supervision of Dr Obaid Siddiqi. Veronica describes why she decided to come to TIFR for her PhD:

In our microbiology course at Trinity we were taught the paper of Sarathy and Siddiqi in J. Molecular Biology on bacterial recombination. I was really impressed by the elegance of the paper.... Before reading the paper, I had never heard of TIFR, nor did I seriously think of returning to India. Actually, I didn’t even think there was much science going on in India. I actually thought the PI was Sarathy and wrote to him. I was very impressed by the ‘Indians’ when I got a letter from Siddiqi, fairly promptly and the letter seemed positive. I remember talking to my teachers and friends in Ireland and we were very impressed that my admission could be discussed as Prof Siddiqi said (among his colleagues) with no red tape and necessity for interview etc. It was this flexibility that once existed in TIFR that made it a special place...

She completed her PhD in 1981 and then went on to obtain post-doctoral training from Max Planck Institute for Biological Cybernetics, Tuebingen, Germany. where she pioneered the study of coding of olfactory information in the brain.

After her post-doc, she came back and worked for the Tata Institute of Fundamental Research (TIFR) and subsequently became a fellow of the Indian National Science Academy. With her experience in neurobiology and behavior alongside her expertise in genetics and development she brought together a group of influential and intellectual researchers to create an olfactory circuitry. This group pioneered the research into chemosensory biology. The field still heavily relies on her standard behavioral and electrophysiological assays to measure adult and larval responses to gustatory and olfactory cues. With the development of new genetic and molecular tools to study the neural circuitry underlying behavior patterns, these assays have seen a major resurgence.

She also assumed many leadership roles in her career — first at the Department of Biological Sciences (earlier the Molecular Biology Unit) at TIFR and later, she became the Chair of the Department of Biological Sciences in TIFR Mumbai. Veronica frequently worked with pupils who had no prior knowledge of experimental biology. These inexperienced interns under her guidance developed into mature, self-assured researchers who went out to join the global network of scientists who started their careers in the Rodrigues lab. Her contribution in fostering the importance of science among youth is not only limited to the city of Mumbai. Through her leadership and tutoring skills, she also ran a biennial course in neurobiology at the International Centre for Theoretical Physics in Trieste. This course made a significant impact on the next generation of people, especially from Africa.

=== Personal life ===
When Veronica moved to India for work, she was not an Indian citizen. She applied for Indian citizenship but only got it with much effort and difficulty twenty years after having moved to the country.

== Causes ==
She was passionate about gender equality in the world of sciences. In 1990, she wrote a letter to then Dean Dr R Vijayaraghavan against the usage of titles for women scientists including 'Smt', 'Kum', or 'Ms'. She emphasized that until usage of 'Shri' and 'Kum' for male scientists became a norm, usage of similar titles for women scientists was unnecessary and unacceptable.
