= Vishnu Savara =

Indian politician (1950–2020)

Member of Maharashtra Legislative Assembly
- In office March 1990 – October 2019
- Constituency: Vikramgad (Oct 2014 to Oct 2019); Bhiwandi Rural (Oct 2009 to Oct 2014); Wada (March 1990 to Oct 2009)

Personal details
- Born: 1 June 1950 Wada, Maharashtra, India
- Died: 9 December 2020 (aged 70) Kokilaben Dhirubhai Ambani Hospital, Mumbai
- Party: Bharatiya Janata Party
- Occupation: Politician

Vishnu Savara (1 June 1950 – 9 December 2020) was a leader of the Bharatiya Janata Party. His parents belonged to a family of farmers residing in the village of Galtare in Wada, a tehsil in Palghar district. Savara, a cabinet minister for tribal development in the government of Maharashtra, was elected to the Maharashtra Legislative Assembly from the Wada constituency in 1990, 1995, 1999, and 2004. In 2009, after delimitation, he won the Bhiwandi Rural Vidhan Sabha election. In the 2014 assembly election, Savara won the Vikramgad Vidhan Sabha seat.

== Early life and education ==
Savara completed his Bachelor of Commerce degree in 1973, and was a senior cashier at Dairy Project Dapchari-Dahanu from 1973 to 1976. In 1976, he was hired by the State Bank of India after a competitive examination and worked in Boisar, Talasari from 1976 to 1980.

== Political career ==
Since university, Savara has been a member of Rashtriya Swayamsevak Sangh. In 1980, he left the State Bank of India to work for the BJP. That year, Savara was the BJP candidate for the Wada Maharashtra Legislative Assembly constituency (now Bhiwandi Rural). He was elected as a Member of the Legislative Assembly for Wada or Bhiwandi Rural in 1990, 1995, 1999, 2004 and 2009, and in 2014 for Vikramgad.

== Death ==
He died on 9 December 2020 after being admitted to Kokilaben Dhirubhai Ambani Hospital, Mumbai, for a few days for cirrhosis.

== See also ==
- Devendra Fadnavis ministry (2014–)
- Narayan Rane ministry
- Make in India

Preceded by	Cabinet Minister for Tribal Development, Maharashtra State; 2014–2019	Succeeded by Ashok Uike
