= Obaid Siddiqi =

Indian geneticist (1932–2013)

- Born: 7 January 1932; Basti, Uttar Pradesh
- Died: 26 July 2013 (aged 81)
- Education: Aligarh Muslim University; University of Glasgow; University of Pennsylvania
- Awards: Padma Bhushan (1984) Padma Vibhushan (2006)
- Scientific career
- Fields: Biology
- Doctoral advisor: Guido Pontecorvo
- Notable students: Veronica Rodrigues

Obaid Siddiqi FRS (7 January 1932 – 26 July 2013) was an Indian National Research Professor and the Founder-Director of the Tata Institute of Fundamental Research (TIFR) National Center for Biological Sciences. He made seminal contributions to the field of behavioural neurogenetics using the genetics and neurobiology of Drosophila.

== Early life and education ==
Obaid Siddiqi was born in 1932 in Basti district of Uttar Pradesh. He received his early education at Aligarh Muslim University where he completed his MSc He completed his PhD at the University of Glasgow, under the supervision of Guido Pontecorvo. He carried out his post doctoral research at the Cold Spring Harbor Laboratory, and University of Pennsylvania. He was invited by Homi Bhabha to set up the molecular biology unit at the Tata Institute of Fundamental Research (TIFR) in Bombay in 1962. Thirty years later, he became the founding director of the TIFR National Center for Biological Sciences in Bangalore, where he would continue his research into his final days of life.

== Research ==
Siddiqi's studies in the field of neurogenetics unravelled the link between genes, behaviour and the brain. In the 1970s, his work with Seymour Benzer at Caltech led to the discovery of temperature-sensitive paralytic Drosophila mutants and the generation and transmission of neural signals. This heralded the dawn of the field of neurogenetics.

At TIFR, Siddiqi and his graduate student, Veronica Rodrigues, isolated and characterized the first collection of mutants with defects in smell and taste in Drosophila. Siddiqi's work in neurogenetics led to the foundational advances in understanding how taste and smell are detected and encoded in the brain.

== Awards and honours ==
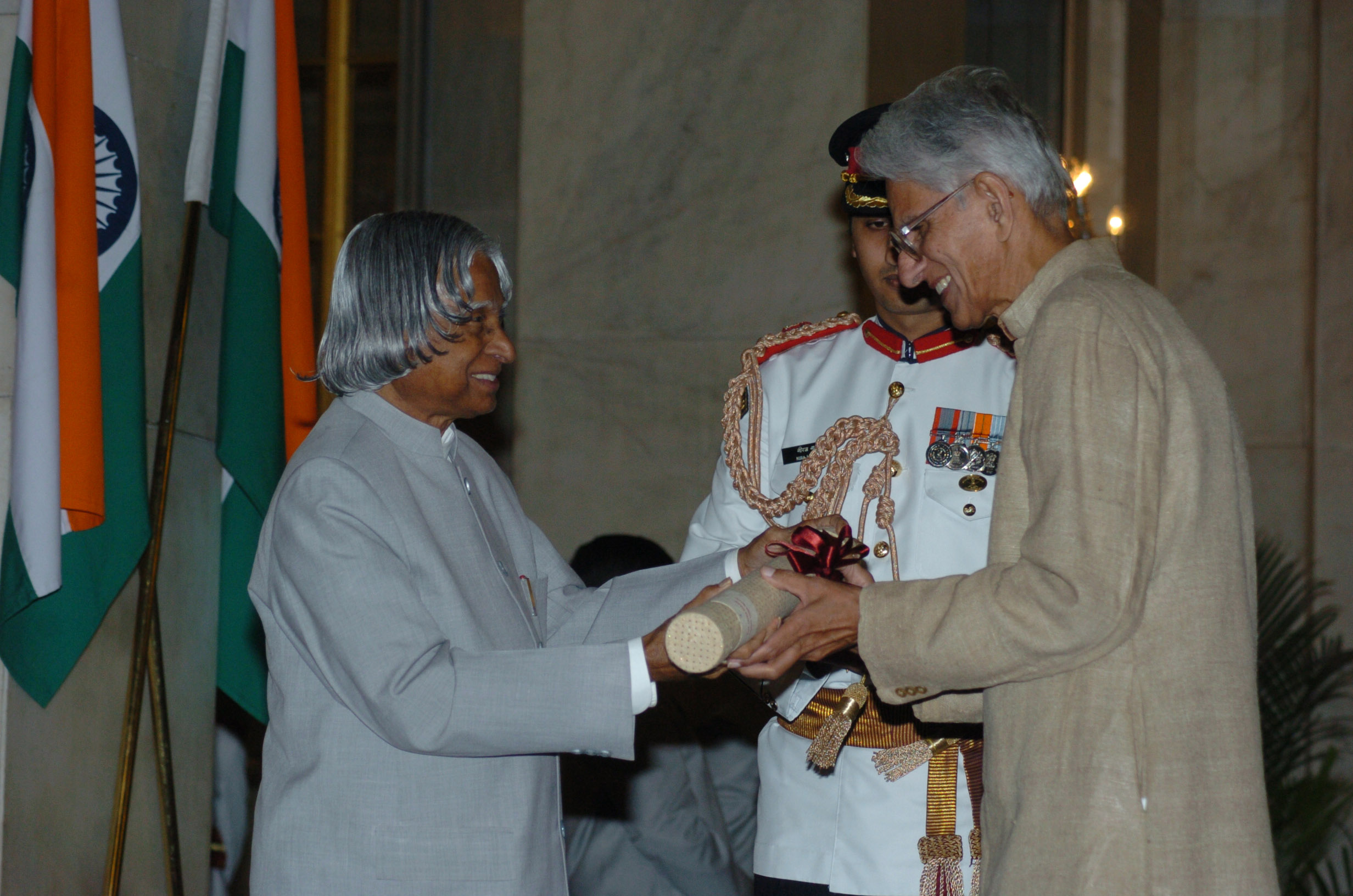
The President, Dr. A.P.J. Abdul Kalam presenting Padma Vibhushan to Prof. Obaid Siddiqi, an eminent scientist, at investiture ceremony, in New Delhi on 29 March 2006

- President of the Indian Academy of Sciences
- Member, Royal Society, London
- Member, US National Academy of Sciences, Washington
- Member, Third World Academy, Trieste
- Visiting professorships at Yale University
- Visiting Professor, Massachusetts Institute of Technology
- Visiting Professor, The California Institute of Technology
- Visiting Professor, Cambridge University
- Twice Sherman Fairchild Distinguished Scholar at Caltech
- Sir Syed Ahmad Khan International Award for Life Sciences 2009
- Padma Vibhushan, 2006
- Dr. B. C. Roy Award, 2004
- Sir Syed Life Time Achievement Award, AMUAA New York, 2004
- Pride of India Award, AFMI, USA, 2004
- INSA Aryabhata Medal 1992;
- Goyal Prize 1991;
- Birla Smarak Kosh National Award 1989;
- Padma Bhushan 1984;
- Bhatnagar Award 1976;
- Life member of Clare Hall, Cambridge.
- Honorary D.Sc., Aligarh Muslim University, Aligarh
- Honorary D.Sc., Banaras Hindu University, Benaras
- Honorary D.Sc., Jamia Hamdard, Delhi
- Honorary D.Sc., Kalyani University, Kalyani
- Honorary D.Sc., Indian Institute of Technology, Bombay
- Honorary D.Sc., Jamia Milia, Delhi
- Honorary D.Sc., Central University of Hyderabad

== Death ==
Siddiqi died on 26 July 2013 in Bangalore following a freak road accident on 21 July 2013 which caused severe damage to the brain. He is survived by his wife Asiya, sons Imran and Kaleem, and daughters Yumna and Diba.

== Selected publications ==
- Siddiqi, O. (1961). "Polarized replication as a possible condition for recombination". Heredity. 16: 328.
- Siddiqi, Obaid H. (14 April 2009). "The fine genetic structure of the pabal region of Aspergillus nidulans". Genetical Research. 3 (1): 69–89. doi:10.1017/S0016672300003116.
- Siddiqi, Obaid H.; Putrament, A. (14 April 2009). "Polarized negative interference in the paba 1 region of Aspergillus nidulans". Genetical Research. 4 (1): 12–20. doi:10.1017/S0016672300003384.
- Garen, A.; Siddiqi, O. (July 1962). "Suppression of mutations in the alkaline phosphatase structural cistron of E. coli". Proceedings of the National Academy of Sciences of the United States of America. 48 (7): 1121–1127. Bibcode:1962PNAS...48.1121G. doi:10.1073/pnas.48.7.1121. PMC 220917. PMID 13896933.
- Siddiqi, Obaid H. (May 1963). "Incorporation of parental DNA into genetic recombinants of E. coli". Proceedings of the National Academy of Sciences of the United States of America. 49 (5): 589–592. Bibcode:1963PNAS...49..589S. doi:10.1073/pnas.49.5.589. PMC 299926. PMID 16591070.
- Siddiqi, O.; Apte, B. N.; Pitale, M. P. (1 January 1966). "Genetic Regulation of Aryl Sulphatases in Aspergillus nidulans". Cold Spring Harbor Symposia on Quantitative Biology. 31: 381–382. doi:10.1101/SQB.1966.031.01.049.
- Joshi, G.P.; Siddiqi, O. (March 1968). "Enzyme synthesis following conjugation and recombination in Escherichia coli". Journal of Molecular Biology. 32 (2): 201–210. doi:10.1016/0022-2836(68)90004-1. PMID 4868420.
- Siddiqi, O.; Fox, M.S. (June 1973). "Integration of donor DNA in bacterial conjugation". Journal of Molecular Biology. 77 (1): 101–123. doi:10.1016/0022-2836(73)90365-3. PMID 4588879.
- Sarathy, P.Vijay; Siddiqi, O. (August 1973). "DNA synthesis during bacterial conjugation". Journal of Molecular Biology. 78 (3): 427–441. doi:10.1016/0022-2836(73)90466-X. PMID 4585325.
- Sarathy, P.Vijay; Siddiqi, O. (August 1973). "DNA synthesis during bacterial conjugation". Journal of Molecular Biology. 78 (3): 443–451. doi:10.1016/0022-2836(73)90467-1. PMID 4585326.
- Sarathy, P. Vijay; Siddiqi, O. (June 1973). "The effect of chromosome transfer on gene expression in Escherichia coli Hfr". Molecular and General Genetics. 125 (2): 125–132. doi:10.1007/BF00268865. PMID 4590267. S2CID 8900439.
- Apte, B.N.; Bhavsar, P.N.; Siddiqi, O. (July 1974). "The regulation of aryl sulphatase in Aspergillus nidulans". Journal of Molecular Biology. 86 (3): 637–648. doi:10.1016/0022-2836(74)90186-7. PMID 4605323.
- Siddiqi, O. (1975). "Genetic blocks in the elements of neural network in Drosophila". In Talwar, G. P. (ed.). Regulation of growth and differentiated function in eukaryote cells. Raven Press. pp. 541–550. ISBN 978-0-89004-032-4.
- Siddiqi, O; Benzer, S (September 1976). "Neurophysiological defects in temperature-sensitive paralytic mutants of Drosophila melanogaster". Proceedings of the National Academy of Sciences of the United States of America. 73 (9): 3253–3257. Bibcode:1976PNAS...73.3253S. doi:10.1073/pnas.73.9.3253. JSTOR 65712. PMC 430996. PMID 184469.
- Siddiqi, Obaid; Rodrigues, Veronica (1980). "Genetic Analysis of a Complex Chemoreceptor". Development and Neurobiology of Drosophila. Vol. 16. pp. 347–359. doi:10.1007/978-1-4684-7968-3_25. ISBN 978-1-4684-7970-6. PMID 6779799.
- Singh, Satpal; Siddiqi, O. (March 1981). "torpid a new sex-linked paralytic mutation in Drosophila melanogaster". Molecular and General Genetics. 181 (3): 400–402. doi:10.1007/BF00425619. PMID 6787392. S2CID 35111844.
- Stocker, R. F.; Singh, R. N.; Schorderet, M.; Siddiqi, O. (July 1983). "Projection patterns of different types of antennal sensilla in the antennal glomeruli of Drosophila melanogaster". Cell and Tissue Research. 232 (2): 237–248. doi:10.1007/BF00213783. PMID 6411344. S2CID 2694046.
- Siddiqi, O. (1983) Olfactory Neurogenetics of Drosophila. Symposium on Neurogenetics. XV International Congress of Genetics. Genetics: New Frontiers. Oxford, Delhi. Vol. III 243–261.
- Arora, Kavita; Rodrigues, Veronica; Joshi, Swati; Shanbhag, Shubha; Siddiqi, Obaid (November 1987). "A gene affecting the specificity of the chemosensory neurons of Drosophila". Nature. 330 (6143): 62–63. Bibcode:1987Natur.330...62A. doi:10.1038/330062a0. PMID 3670396. S2CID 4348467.
- Siddiqi, O. (1988) Genetic Variation in Drosophila chemoreception. Genetics and Immunology of Chemical Communication. Monell Research Center, Philadelphia.
- Ayyub, C., Paranjape, J., Rodrigues, V. & Siddiqi, O. (1990). Genetics of olfactory behavior in Drosophila melanogaster. J. Neurogenet. 6: 243–262.
- Siddiqi, O.(1990) Olfaction in Drosophila. Chemical senses Vol. 3 Eds. Wyzocki et al. Marcel Dekker, NY, 79–96.
- Jayaram, V.C. and Siddiqi, O. (1997). gustJ a salt insensitive mutant of Drosophila. Journal of Genetics, 76: 133–145.
- Bala, A.D.S., Panchal, P. and Siddiqi, O. (1998). Osmotaropotaxis in the larva of Drosophila melanogaster. Current science, 75: 48–51.
- Mistry, Y., R. Mistry, and O. Siddiqi, O. (2000). Evidence of age-related changes in the antennal glomeruli of Drosophila melanogaster using monoclonal antibodies. Arthropod Structure and Development. Vol.29 (2) 101–110.
- Khurana S, Abu Baker MB, Siddiqi O. (2009). Odour avoidance learning in the larva of Drosophila melanogaster. J. Biosci. 34: 621–631.
- Chakraborty TS, Goswami S.P, Siddiqi O. (2009). Sensory correlates of imaginal conditioning in Drosophila melanogaster. J. Neurogenet. 23: 210–219.
- Iyengar A, Chakraborty TS, Goswami SP, Wu CF, Siddiqi O.(2010) Post-eclosion odor experience modifies olfactory neuron coding in Drosophila. Proc. Natl. Acad. Sci. U S A. 107(21):9855-60.
