= Bhiwandi East Assembly constituency =

Constituency of the Maharashtra legislative assembly in India

Coordinates: 19.295°N 73.079°E

Bhiwandi East
- Constituency No. 137 for the Maharashtra Legislative Assembly
- Rais Shaikh, present MLA of Bhiwandi east

Constituency details
- Country: India
- Region: Western India
- State: Maharashtra
- District: Thane
- Lok Sabha constituency: Bhiwandi
- Established: 2008
- Total electors: 373,659
- Reservation: None

Member of Legislative Assembly
- 15th Maharashtra Legislative Assembly
- Incumbent Rais Shaikh
- Party: SP
- Alliance: INDIA
- Elected year: 2024

Bhiwandi East Assembly constituency is one of the 288 Vidhan Sabha (legislative assembly) constituencies of Maharashtra state, western India. This constituency is located in Thane district.

== Geographical scope ==
The constituency comprises ward nos. 6 to 17, 36 to 50 and 62 to 65, of Bhiwandi-Nizampur Municipal Corporation and Bhinar saja (villages of yewai,bhinar,savande,gorsai,walshind, nimbavali) Bhiwandi revenue circle all a part of Bhiwandi taluka.

== List of Members of Legislative Assembly ==
Year	Member	Party
Until 2008: Constituency did not exist
2009	Abu Azmi	Samajwadi Party
2010^	Rupesh Mhatre	Shiv Sena
2014	Rupesh Mhatre	Shiv Sena
2019	Rais Shaikh	Samajwadi Party
2024	Rais Shaikh	Samajwadi Party

^by-election

== Election results ==
=== Assembly Election 2024 ===
2024 Maharashtra Legislative Assembly election : Bhiwandi East
Party	Candidate	Votes	%	±%
SP	Rais Shaikh	119,687	62.68%	▲27.08
SS	Santosh Manjayya Shetty	67,672	35.44%	▲0.87
NOTA	None of the Above	738	0.39%	▼0.68
Margin of victory		52,015	27.24%	▲26.21
Turnout		1,91,691	51.30%	▲3.72
Total valid votes		1,90,953		
Registered electors		3,73,659		▲38.43
SP hold		Swing	▲27.08	

=== Assembly Election 2019 ===
2019 Maharashtra Legislative Assembly election : Bhiwandi East
Party	Candidate	Votes	%	±%
SP	Rais Shaikh	45,537	35.60%	▲21.11
SS	Rupesh Laxman Mhatre	44,223	34.57%	▲6.87
INC	Santosh Manjayya Shetty	32,198	25.17%	▲15.88
VBA	Budhesh Laxman Jadhav	2,065	1.61%	New
MNS	Manoj Waman Gulvi	1,492	1.17%	New
NOTA	None of the Above	1,358	1.06%	▲0.56
Margin of victory		1,314	1.03%	▼1.77
Turnout		1,29,289	47.90%	▲3.25
Total valid votes		1,27,913		
Registered electors		2,69,935		▼1.62
SP gain from SS		Swing	▲7.90	

=== Assembly Election 2014 ===
2014 Maharashtra Legislative Assembly election : Bhiwandi East
Party	Candidate	Votes	%	±%
SS	Rupesh Laxman Mhatre	33,541	27.70%	▼9.50
BJP	Santosh Manjayya Shetty	30,148	24.90%	New
SP	Abu farhan Azmi	17,541	14.49%	▼20.96
AIMIM	Khan Md. Akram Abdul Hannam	14,577	12.04%	New
INC	Ansari Mo. Fajil	11,257	9.30%	▼16.38
NCP	Mohammad Khalid Guddu	9,057	7.48%	New
CPI	Vijay Kamble	1,563	1.29%	New
NOTA	None of the Above	612	0.51%	New
Margin of victory		3,393	2.80%	▲1.04
Turnout		1,21,712	44.36%	▲1.52
Total valid votes		1,21,088		
Registered electors		2,74,371		▲22.95
SS hold		Swing	▼9.50	

=== Assembly By-election 2010 ===
2010 Maharashtra Legislative Assembly by-election : Bhiwandi East
Party	Candidate	Votes	%	±%
SS	Rupesh Laxman Mhatre	35,376	37.20%	▲9.67
SP	Farhan Abu Asim Azmi	33,700	35.44%	▼6.63
INC	Saiyad Muzaffar Hussain N.H.	24,418	25.68%	▲11.26
Margin of victory		1,676	1.76%	▼12.77
Turnout		95,087	42.61%	▲2.54
Total valid votes		95,087		
Registered electors		2,23,153		▲0.09
SS gain from SP		Swing	▼4.87	

=== Assembly Election 2009 ===
2009 Maharashtra Legislative Assembly election : Bhiwandi East
Party	Candidate	Votes	%	±%
SP	Abu Azmi	37,584	42.07%	New
SS	Patil Yogesh Ramesh	24,599	27.54%	New
INC	Gurunath Janardan Tawre	12,881	14.42%	New
Independent	Sonya Kashinath Patil	4,707	5.27%	New
Independent	D.Raaja	2,039	2.28%	New
Independent	Ansari Abbas Ali Jalil Ahmed	1,940	2.17%	New
BSP	Giri Satish Babu	1,284	1.44%	New
Margin of victory		12,985	14.54%	
Turnout		89,340	40.07%	
Total valid votes		89,335		
Registered electors		2,22,958		
SP win (new seat)				
