= Wada Assembly constituency =

Former constituency of the Maharashtra legislative assembly in India

Coordinates: 19.66°N 73.15°E

Wada
- Former constituency for the Maharashtra Legislative Assembly

Constituency details
- Country: India
- Region: Western India
- State: Maharashtra
- Established: 1951
- Abolished: 2008

Wada Vidhan Sabha constituency was one of the seats in Maharashtra Legislative Assembly in India. Wada is near Mumbai, Thane, and Palghar. The area under this seat is now mostly divided as a part of Bhiwandi Rural and Vikramgad Vidhan Sabha seats since 2008.

Vishnu Savara, who represented this Wada seat (विष्णु सावरा, वाडा मतदारसंघ) for close to 20 years, was later elected to Vidhan Sabha from Bhiwandi Rural Assembly constituency in 2009 and from Vikramgad seat in 2014.

== Members of Vidhan Sabha ==
Year	Member	Party
1978	Somnath Wani	Janata Party
1980	Gowari Shankar Aba	Indian National Congress (I)
1985	Gowari Shankar Aba	Indian National Congress
1990	Vishnu Savara	Bharatiya Janata Party
1995	Vishnu Savara	Bharatiya Janata Party
1999	Vishnu Savara	Bharatiya Janata Party
2004	Vishnu Savara	Bharatiya Janata Party
2008 onwards : Constituency defunct

== Election results ==
=== Assembly Election 2004 ===
2004 Maharashtra Legislative Assembly election : Wada
Party	Candidate	Votes	%	±%
BJP	Vishnu Rama Savar	77,351	47.15%	▲0.04
NCP	Suresh Haribhau Pawar	43,261	26.37%	▲7.55
Independent	Mohan Baban Pawar	31,356	19.11%	New
BSP	Shyam Dattu Mahakal	7,739	4.72%	New
PWPI	Jadhav Pandharinath Tukaram	4,357	2.66%	New
Margin of victory		34,090	20.78%	▼7.51
Turnout		164,072	51.41%	▲1.48
Total valid votes		164,064		
Registered electors		319,162		▲28.63
BJP hold		Swing	▲0.04	

=== Assembly Election 1999 ===
1999 Maharashtra Legislative Assembly election : Wada
Party	Candidate	Votes	%	±%
BJP	Vishnu Rama Savar	54,696	47.11%	▼0.69
NCP	Patil Shantaram Dundaram	21,848	18.82%	New
INC	Jadhav Baliram Sukar	18,163	15.64%	▼8.78
Independent	Varana Ramchandra Dharu	11,156	9.61%	New
CPI(M)	Varatha Haribhau Soma	10,242	8.82%	▼2.05
Margin of victory		32,848	28.29%	▲4.92
Turnout		123,885	49.93%	▼15.19
Total valid votes		116,105		
Registered electors		248,123		▲5.92
BJP hold		Swing	▼0.69	

=== Assembly Election 1995 ===
1995 Maharashtra Legislative Assembly election : Wada
Party	Candidate	Votes	%	±%
BJP	Vishnu Rama Savar	72,919	47.80%	▼2.18
INC	Lahange Babu Kashinath	37,260	24.43%	▼12.56
CPI(M)	Gahala Raja Rama	16,581	10.87%	New
Independent	Nankar Keshav Valya	10,755	7.05%	New
JD	Kale Shankar Ladku	6,352	4.16%	▼8.13
Independent	Vanage Raghunath Zipar	3,350	2.20%	New
BSP	Desale Kashinath Ramchandra	3,004	1.97%	New
Margin of victory		35,659	23.38%	▲10.38
Turnout		159,037	67.89%	▲13.23
Total valid votes		152,543		
Registered electors		234,266		▲26.10
BJP hold		Swing	▼2.18	

=== Assembly Election 1990 ===
1990 Maharashtra Legislative Assembly election : Wada
Party	Candidate	Votes	%	±%
BJP	Vishnu Rama Savar	48,184	49.99%	▲12.40
INC	Duinada Laxman Kadya	35,656	36.99%	▼6.59
JD	Gaikar Ambo Narayan	11,849	12.29%	New
Independent	Jadhav Jeevan Bhagwan	706	0.73%	New
Margin of victory		12,528	13.00%	▲7.01
Turnout		98,689	53.12%	▲11.43
Total valid votes		96,395		
Registered electors		185,777		▲33.62
BJP gain from INC		Swing	▲6.41	

=== Assembly Election 1985 ===
1985 Maharashtra Legislative Assembly election : Wada
Party	Candidate	Votes	%	±%
INC	Gowari Shankar Aba	24,513	43.58%	New
BJP	Vishnu Rama Savar	21,145	37.59%	▲1.47
Independent	Gajanan Dagale	5,804	10.32%	New
Independent	Kamadi Raghunath Mau	4,791	8.52%	New
Margin of victory		3,368	5.99%	▲1.40
Turnout		57,895	41.64%	▲7.84
Total valid votes		56,253		
Registered electors		139,033		▲9.40
INC gain from INC(I)		Swing	▲2.87	

=== Assembly Election 1980 ===
1980 Maharashtra Legislative Assembly election : Wada
Party	Candidate	Votes	%	±%
INC(I)	Gowari Shankar Aba	16,874	40.71%	▲32.06
BJP	Vishnu Rama Savar	14,974	36.12%	New
PWPI	Telam Krishnakant Ramchandra	9,606	23.17%	▲5.68
Margin of victory		1,900	4.58%	▼14.58
Turnout		42,652	33.56%	▼21.36
Total valid votes		41,454		
Registered electors		127,091		▲10.08
INC(I) gain from JP		Swing	▼5.81	

=== Assembly Election 1978 ===
1978 Maharashtra Legislative Assembly election : Wada
Party	Candidate	Votes	%	±%
JP	Wani Somnath Rama	28,989	46.51%	New
INC	Kale Shankar Ladku	17,047	27.35%	New
PWPI	Deu Kali Hamre	10,899	17.49%	New
INC(I)	Gowari Shankar Aba	5,388	8.65%	New
Margin of victory		11,942	19.16%	
Turnout		64,833	56.15%	
Total valid votes		62,323		
Registered electors		115,455		
JP win (new seat)				

== See also ==
- List of constituencies of Maharashtra Legislative Assembly
