= Shantaram More =

Indian politician

Shantaram Tukaram More

Member of the Maharashtra Legislative Assembly
- Constituency: Bhiwandi Rural
- In office 2014–2019
- In office 2019–2024

Personal details
- Born: 1 July 1970 (age 56) Bhiwandi
- Party: Shiv Sena

Shantaram Tukaram More (born 1 July 1970) is a Shiv Sena politician from Thane district, Maharashtra. He was elected as member of the 13th Maharashtra Legislative Assembly in 2014. In 2019 he was elected again to the 14th Maharashtra Legislative Assembly with a margin of 44509 votes. He currently represents Bhiwandi Rural Assembly Constituency.

== Positions held ==
- 2012: Elected as Member of Zilla Parishad, Thane.
- 2014: Elected as Member of 13th Maharashtra Legislative Assembly (Bhiwandi-Rural)
- 2019: Elected as Member of 14th Maharashtra Legislative Assembly (Bhiwandi-Rural)
- 2022: Elected as Chairperson of V.J.N.T. Committee, Maharashtra Government (Minister Class)

== See also ==
- Bhiwandi Lok Sabha constituency
