= Kalyan West Assembly constituency =

Constituency of the Maharashtra legislative assembly in India

Coordinates: 19.245°N 73.124°E

Kalyan West
- Constituency No. 138 for the Maharashtra Legislative Assembly

Constituency details
- Country: India
- Region: Western India
- State: Maharashtra
- District: Thane
- Lok Sabha constituency: Bhiwandi
- Established: 2008
- Total electors: 440,729
- Reservation: None

Member of Legislative Assembly
- 15th Maharashtra Legislative Assembly
- Incumbent Vishwanath Bhoir
- Party: SHS
- Alliance: NDA
- Elected year: 2024

Kalyan West Assembly constituency is one of the 288 Vidhan Sabha (legislative assembly) constituencies of Maharashtra state, western India. This constituency is located in Thane district.

== Geographical scope ==
The constituency comprises parts of Kalyan Taluka, that is parts of Kalyan Dombivali Municipal Corporation viz. wards 1 to 12 and 35 to 50 and Manda saja in Kalyan revenue circle.

== Members of the Legislative Assembly ==
Election	Member	Party
1952	Kanji Govind Kerson	Indian National Congress
2009	Bhoir Prakash Sukhdeo	Maharashtra Navnirman Sena
2014	Narendra Baburao Pawar	Bharatiya Janata Party
2019	Vishwanath Atmaram Bhoir	Shiv Sena
2024	Vishwanath Atmaram Bhoir	Shiv Sena

== Election results ==
=== Assembly Election 2024 ===
2024 Maharashtra Legislative Assembly election : Kalyan West
Party	Candidate	Votes	%	±%
SS	Vishwanath Atmaram Bhoir	126,020	51.91%	▲16.75
SS(UBT)	Basare Sachin Dilip	83,566	34.42%	New
MNS	Bhoir Ulhas Mahadev	22,114	9.11%	▼11.33
VBA	Ayaz Gulzar Moulvi	3,628	1.49%	▼3.70
NOTA	None of the above	2,774	1.14%	▼0.76
Margin of victory		42,454	17.49%	▲5.53
Turnout		245,550	55.71%	▲13.80
Total valid votes		242,776		
Registered electors		440,729		▼2.69
SS hold		Swing	▲16.75	

=== Assembly Election 2019 ===
2019 Maharashtra Legislative Assembly election : Kalyan West
Party	Candidate	Votes	%	±%
SS	Vishwanath Atmaram Bhoir	65,486	35.16%	▲5.52
Independent	Narendra Baburao Pawar	43,209	23.20%	New
MNS	Prakash Sukhdev Bhoir	38,075	20.44%	▲8.71
INC	Kanchan Yogesh Kulkarni	11,648	6.25%	▼5.20
AIMIM	Ayaz Gulzar Moulvi	10,110	5.43%	New
VBA	Naresh Shani Gaikwad	9,665	5.19%	New
NOTA	None of the above	3,542	1.90%	▲0.86
Independent	Sajitha Jayakrishnan Nair	2,091	1.12%	New
Independent	Dhumal Sunil Gangaram	1,603	0.86%	New
BSP	Ashish Vijay Tambe	1,513	0.81%	▼0.90
Margin of victory		22,277	11.96%	▲10.70
Turnout		189,834	41.91%	▼3.05
Total valid votes		186,248		
Registered electors		452,924		▲14.10
SS gain from BJP		Swing	▲4.26	

=== Assembly Election 2014 ===
2014 Maharashtra Legislative Assembly election : Kalyan West
Party	Candidate	Votes	%	±%
BJP	Narendra Baburao Pawar	54,388	30.90%	New
SS	Vijay (Bandya) Jagannath Salvi	52,169	29.64%	▲5.11
MNS	Prakash Sukhdev Bhoir	20,649	11.73%	▼16.63
INC	Sachin Dattatrey Pote	20,160	11.45%	▼10.97
Independent	Prakash Mutha	9,834	5.59%	New
NCP	Sanjay Haribhau Patil	9,440	5.36%	New
Independent	Devanand Namdev Bhoir	3,387	1.92%	New
BSP	Kamble Madhukar Mokashi	3,005	1.71%	▲0.83
NOTA	None of the above	1,838	1.04%	New
Margin of victory		2,219	1.26%	▼2.57
Turnout		178,472	44.96%	▲0.01
Total valid votes		176,016		
Registered electors		396,951		▲23.07
BJP gain from MNS		Swing	▲2.54	

=== Assembly Election 2009 ===
2009 Maharashtra Legislative Assembly election : Kalyan West
Party	Candidate	Votes	%	±%
MNS	Bhoir Prakash Sukhdeo	41,111	28.36%	New
SS	Deolekar Rajendra Jayant	35,562	24.53%	New
INC	Alaka Awalasakar	32,496	22.42%	▼17.15
Independent	Gaikar Mangesh Dasharath	22,139	15.27%	New
RPI(A)	Pralhad Dunda Jadhav	6,282	4.33%	New
Independent	Ramesh Vitthal Walanj	2,143	1.48%	New
BSP	Adv. Pralhad Parshuram Bhilare	1,278	0.88%	New
Margin of victory		5,549	3.83%	▼12.86
Turnout		144,961	44.95%	▲0.48
Total valid votes		144,961		
Registered electors		322,529		▲584.72
MNS gain from INC		Swing	▼11.21	

=== Assembly Election 1952 ===
1952 Bombay State Legislative Assembly election : Kalyan West
Party	Candidate	Votes	%	±%
INC	Kanji Govind Kerson	8,287	39.57%	New
ABHM	Phadke Ganesh Krishnaji	4,791	22.87%	New
PWPI	Dhulup Krishnaji Narayan	4,319	20.62%	New
Socialist	Sule Balkrishna Trimbak	3,069	14.65%	New
Independent	Mhatre Sitaram Namdeo	479	2.29%	New
Margin of victory		3,496	16.69%	
Turnout		20,945	44.47%	
Total valid votes		20,945		
Registered electors		47,104		
INC win (new seat)				
