= Bhiwandi Rural Assembly constituency =

Constituency of the Maharashtra legislative assembly in India

Coordinates: 19.34°N 73.13°E

Bhiwandi Rural
- Constituency No. 134 for the Maharashtra Legislative Assembly

Constituency details
- Country: India
- Region: Western India
- State: Maharashtra
- District: Thane
- Lok Sabha constituency: Bhiwandi
- Established: 2008
- Total electors: 337,778
- Reservation: ST

Member of Legislative Assembly
- 15th Maharashtra Legislative Assembly
- Incumbent Shantaram Tukaram More
- Party: SHS
- Alliance: NDA
- Elected year: 2024

Bhiwandi Rural is one of the 288 Vidhan Sabha (legislative assembly) constituencies of the Maharashtra state in western India. This constituency is located in Thane district and Palghar district, and was created in 2008 delimitation exercise. Most of the area under it was earlier covered by the erstwhile Wada Assembly constituency. It is a segment of Bhiwandi (Lok Sabha constituency) .

== Geographical scope ==
The constituency comprises parts of Bhiwandi taluka viz. revenue circles Dighashi, Angaon, Padgha, Additional Bhiwandi, Kharbav, Padgha (CT), Kon (CT) parts of Wada taluka viz. revenue circles Wada.

== Members of the Legislative Assembly ==
Year	Member	Party
Until 2008: See Wada
2009	Vishnu Savara	Bharatiya Janata Party
2014	Shantaram More	Shiv Sena
2019	Shantaram More	Shiv Sena
2024	Shantaram More	Shiv Sena

== Election results ==
=== Assembly Election 2024 ===
2024 Maharashtra Legislative Assembly election : Bhiwandi Rural
Party	Candidate	Votes	%	±%
SS	Shantaram More	127,205	53.25%	▲3.94
SS(UBT)	Ghatal Mahadev Ambo	69,243	28.99%	New
Independent	Manisha Rohidas Thakare	24,304	10.17%	New
MNS	Vanita Shashikant Kathore	13,816	5.78%	▼17.26
VBA	Pradip Dayanand Harane	2,715	1.14%	▼1.48
NOTA	None of the Above	2,571	1.08%	▼0.89
Margin of victory		57,962	24.26%	▼2.00
Turnout		2,41,460	71.48%	▲12.16
Total valid votes		2,38,889		
Registered electors		3,37,778		▲16.73
SS hold		Swing	▲3.94	

=== Assembly Election 2019 ===
2019 Maharashtra Legislative Assembly election : Bhiwandi Rural
Party	Candidate	Votes	%	±%
SS	Shantaram More	83,567	49.31%	▲16.03
MNS	Shubhangi Ramesh Govari	39,058	23.05%	▲8.13
NCP	Madhuri Shashikant Mhatre	33,571	19.81%	▲6.16
CPI	Mhase Nitesh Jagan	4,958	2.93%	New
VBA	Swapnil Mahadeo Koli	4,426	2.61%	New
NOTA	None of the Above	3,340	1.97%	▲0.65
RMPI	Co. Laxaman Sukary Wadu	2,509	1.48%	New
Independent	Sitaram Arjun Dive	1,385	0.82%	New
Margin of victory		44,509	26.26%	▲20.92
Turnout		1,72,858	59.74%	▼6.79
Total valid votes		1,69,474		
Registered electors		2,89,361		▲10.26
SS hold		Swing	▲16.03	

=== Assembly Election 2014 ===
2014 Maharashtra Legislative Assembly election : Bhiwandi Rural
Party	Candidate	Votes	%	±%
SS	Shantaram More	57,082	33.28%	New
BJP	Patil Shantaram Dundaram	47,922	27.94%	▼6.74
MNS	Dashrath Dundaram Patil	25,580	14.91%	▼12.15
NCP	Ghatal Mahadev Ambo	23,413	13.65%	▼19.41
INC	Sachin Damodar Shingda	10,923	6.37%	New
NOTA	None of the Above	2,267	1.32%	New
BSP	More Tukaram Suresh	2,090	1.22%	▼0.57
BVA	Dumada Rajesh Budhaji	1,318	0.77%	New
Margin of victory		9,160	5.34%	▲3.72
Turnout		1,73,814	66.23%	▲8.71
Total valid votes		1,71,531		
Registered electors		2,62,433		▲9.70
SS gain from BJP		Swing	▼1.40	

=== Assembly Election 2009 ===
2009 Maharashtra Legislative Assembly election : Bhiwandi Rural
Party	Candidate	Votes	%	±%
BJP	Vishnu Savara	46,996	34.67%	New
NCP	Patil Shantaram Dundaram	44,804	33.06%	New
MNS	Dashrath Dundaram Patil	36,687	27.07%	New
Independent	Govind Valkya Rawate	4,624	3.41%	New
BSP	Prabhakar Shankar Waghe	2,427	1.79%	New
Margin of victory		2,192	1.62%	
Turnout		1,35,549	56.66%	
Total valid votes		1,35,538		
Registered electors		2,39,237		
BJP win (new seat)				
