= Nationalist Congress Party (Secular) =

- Abbreviation: NCP(S)
- Founder: A. K. Saseendran; Thomas K. Thomas
- Founded: 29 May 2026
- Dissolved: 25 September 2026
- Split from: Nationalist Congress Party (Sharadchandra Pawar)
- Merged into: Congress Socialist Party

Nationalist Congress Party (Secular) was an Indian political party in the state of Kerala. It was formed when a faction led by A. K. Saseendran and Thomas K. Thomas left Nationalist Congress Party (Sharadchandra Pawar) alleging that the national leadership of the party was getting closer to Bharatiya Janata Party compromising its secular stand and Kerala unit leader P. C. Chacko was violating internal democracy with authorisation tendency.

On 25 September 2026, the party along with Congress (Secular) announced merger to form one left-wing party named either Congress Socialist Party or Congress Secular Party. From 23-25 October 2026, the two parties went through unity conference and the new party was officially named as Congress Socialist Party.
