= Mahesh Prabhakar Choughule =

Indian politician

Member of the Maharashtra Legislative Assembly
- Incumbent
- Assumed office 10 November 2014
- Preceded by: Abdul Rashid Tahir Momin
- Constituency: Bhiwandi West

Personal details
- Party: Bharatiya Janata Party
- Occupation: Politician
- Website: mahabjp.org

Mahesh Prabhakar Choughule is an Indian politician and member of the Bharatiya Janata Party. He has been elected three times as MLA for Bhiwandi and secured the seat for BJP in minority populated area. He is a second term member of the Maharashtra Legislative Assembly.

== Constituency ==
Mahesh Prabhakar Choughule was elected from the Bhiwandi West Assembly Constituency Maharashtra.

== Positions held ==
- Maharashtra Legislative Assembly MLA.
- Terms in office: 2014–2019, 2019 till now
