= Suresh Kashinath Taware =

Indian politician

MP
- Constituency: Bhiwandi

Personal details
- Party: INC
- Children: 2

Suresh Kashinath Taware was a member of the 15th Lok Sabha of India. He represents the Bhiwandi constituency of Maharashtra and is a member of the Indian National Congress (INC) political party.
