= Natasha Mhatre =

Canadian biologist

- Born: 1979 (age 46–47); Mumbai, India

Academic background
- Education: Indian Institute of Science
- Thesis: The Prediction Of Field Cricket Phonotaxis In Complex Acoustic Environments (2007)
- Doctoral advisor: Rohini Balakrishnan

Academic work
- Discipline: Biology
- Institutions: University of Western Ontario
- Website: www.natashamhatre.net

Natasha Mhatre is a researcher in Canada at Western University whose research focuses on animal communication. Focusing on insect biomechanics, she is an assistant professor and NSERC Canada Research Chair in invertebrate neurobiology.

== Education ==
Mhatre earned her Bachelor of Science from Mumbai University in 1999, and her Master of Science and doctorate from the Indian Institute of Science in 2002 and 2008, respectively.

== Research ==
Mhatre's work has covered insect communication and biomechanics. Some of her research has been focused on Black Widow spiders, and she has been called a "Tree cricket expert". Her work has had applications beyond spiders and insects to Tuvan throat singers, where she collaborated with a group to investigate how these unique sounds were produced.

Mhatre holds an NSERC Canada Research Chair, and was a recipient of the Marie Curie Fellowship to support her post doctoral research.

The Otomi tree cricket Oecanthus mhatreae was named after her.
