= Gandhian socialism (Hindu nationalism) =

Branch of socialism based on Hindu nationalist interpretation

Gandhian socialism is the branch of socialism based on the Hindu nationalist interpretation of the theories of Mahatma Gandhi. Gandhian socialism generally centers on Hind Swaraj or Indian Home Rule authored by Gandhi.

Federation of political and economical power and demonstrating a traditionalist reluctance towards the modernisation of technology and large scale industrialisation whilst emphasising self-employment and self-reliance are key features of Gandhian socialism.

== Background ==
Gandhi's views on socialism were greatly influenced by ideas that he embraced from his reading of Ruskin's Unto This Last in 1904 during a 24-hour train journey in South Africa. He translated the book into Gujarati as Sarvodaya (welfare of all) and summarized its contents into three main ideas:

1. That the good of the individual is contained in the good of all.
2. That a lawyer's work has the same value as the barber's, in as much as all have the same right of earning their livelihood from their work.
3. That a life of labor—that is, the life of the tiller of the soil and the handicraftsman—is the life worth living.

He articulated his ideas in his work titled Swaraj and India of My Dreams in which, he describes Indian society, with no one rich or poor, no class conflict, where there is an equal distribution of the resources, and self-sufficient economy without any exploitation and violence. Thus, Gandhi differed from Western socialism because the latter believed in material progress whereas Gandhi considered every one materially equal.

As Jawahar Lal Nehru puts in his biography, "he suspects also socialism, and more particularly Marxism, because of their association with violence." He believed his style of socialism came from the strong beliefs he held in non-violence and not those adopted from any books. Many experts observed that Gandhi's concept of socialism was a result of ethical considerations, but had nothing to do with class-consciousness as professed by the western socialism. There was also a religious aspect of Gandhi's socialism. To understand Gandhi's socialist philosophy, as Romain Rolland observed; "it should be realized that his doctrine is like a huge edifice composed of two different floors or grades. Below is the solid groundwork, the basic foundation of religion. On this vast and unshakable foundation is based the political and social campaign."

=== Economic philosophy ===
The key aspects of the economic policies of Gandhi were based on ethics. According to Gandhi: "Economics that hurts the moral well-being of a human or a nation is immoral and, therefore sinful". Hence, Gandhi roots for economic social justice by promoting equality for all. Evolving from this ideology, the economic components of Gandhian socialism are centered around Swaraj, resulting from complete economic freedom. This is achieved through self-sufficiency and self-reliance, where, everyone gets an appropriate share of his labor. According to Marbaniang, Gandhian social economics argues "for a decentralized, nonparliamentarian, and autonomous rural communitarian self-governance based on the concept of the dignity of labor and the individual ethic of nonviolent social cooperation." Therefore, Gandhi advocates a society without economic classes, which Gandhi termed it as Sarvodaya. An example of this concept can be seen in the implementation of Panchayat Raj in India.

In 1938, during the formulation of an economic plan for the post-independent India, it was noted that the planning under a democratic India should be based not only on raising the standard of living by copying various socialist, capitalist, or a fascist nation's plan, but it should be centered towards its roots firm in Indian soil and India's problems.

== Bharatiya Janata Party ==
Atal Bihari Vajpayee and other Bharatiya Janata Party (BJP) party leaders initially attempted to incorporate "Gandhian socialism" as one of the ideological influences of the party in the 1980s to moderate its Hindu nationalism, but the BJP failed to achieve electoral success from this.

== See also ==
- Integral humanism (Hindu nationalism)
- List of things named after Mahatma Gandhi
- Practices and beliefs of Mahatma Gandhi#Gandhian economics

== Bibliography ==
- Koshal, Rajindar K.; Koshal, Manjulika (April 1973a). "Gandhian Economic Philosophy". American Journal of Economics and Sociology. 32 (2): 191–209. doi:10.1111/j.1536-7150.1973.tb02190.x. JSTOR 3485726.
- Pradhan, Benudhar (1980). The Socialist Thought of Mahatma Gandhi: Vol-1. GDK Publications.
- Koshal, Manjulika; Koshal, Rajindar K. (July 1973b). "Gandhi's Influence on Indian Economic Planning: A Critical Analysis". The American Journal of Economics and Sociology. 32 (3): 311–330. doi:10.1111/j.1536-7150.1973.tb03156.x. JSTOR 3485967.
