= National Centre for Biological Sciences =

Research center in Bangalore, India

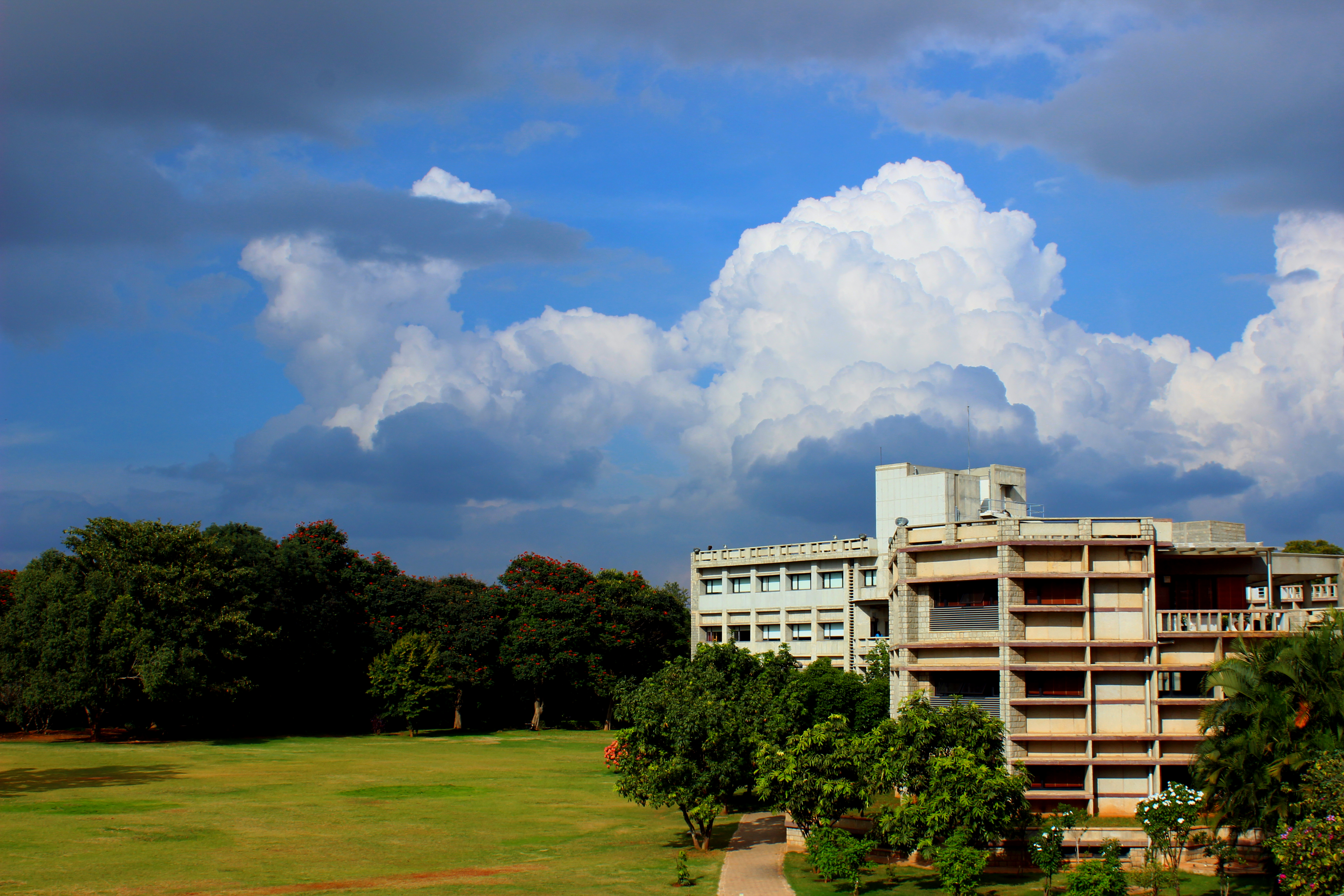
- Type: Research institution
- Established: 1992
- Founder: Obaid Siddiqi
- Parent institution: Tata Institute of Fundamental Research
- Director: L. S. Shashidhara
- Dean: Upinder Singh Bhalla
- Academic staff: 36
- Administrative staff: 100
- Location: Bangalore, Karnataka, India; 13.0822°N 77.5763°E
- Campus: Urban
- Website: www.ncbs.res.in

National Centre for Biological Sciences (NCBS) in Bangalore, Karnataka, is a research centre specialising in biological research. It is a part of the Tata Institute of Fundamental Research (TIFR) under the Department of Atomic Energy of the Government of India. The mandate of NCBS is basic and interdisciplinary research in the frontier areas of biology. The research interests of the faculty are in four broad areas ranging from the study of single molecules to systems biology. Obaid Siddiqi FRS (7 January 1932 – 26 July 2013) was an Indian National Research Professor and the Founder-Director of NCBS. He made several contributions to the field of behavioural neurogenetics using the genetics and neurobiology of Drosophila.

== Research areas ==
NCBS focuses on fundamental research from diverse fields of biology including biochemistry, biophysics, bioinformatics, neurobiology, cellular organization and signalling, genetics and development, theory and modelling of biological systems, ecology and evolution etc. NCBS offers PhD, Integrated PhD and M.Sc. by Research in these areas. It also offers M.Sc. in Wildlife Biology and Conservation every alternative year. Till 2016, it has produced over 182 PhD holders and 65 M.Sc. degree holders in Wildlife Biology and Conservation.

== Centres and programs ==
In addition to various research labs, NCBS hosts following research centres or programs:

- The Simons Centre for the study of Living Machines
- NCBS-Max Planck Lipid Center
- Chemical Ecology
- Accelerator program for Discovery in Brain disorders using Stem cells (ADBS)
- Masters in Wildlife Biology & Conservation
- Archives at NCBS

== Bangalore bio-cluster ==
NCBS engages in a number of collaborative initiatives, such as Institute for Stem Cell Biology and Regenerative Medicine (inStem) and the Centre for Cellular and Molecular Platforms (C-CAMP). Together these three institutions serve as part of the Bangalore bio-cluster, bringing together fundamental research, translational studies, and technology development.

== Controversies and allegations ==
in 2020–2021, multiple allegations appeared in PubPeer, where some faculty at NCBS were alleged to be involved in data manipulation in their publications and lead to internal investigation and retraction from journal.

== See also ==
- TIFR
