= Karivali =

- Census town
- Nickname: Bilson
- Location in Maharashtra, India
- Coordinates: 19.2922°N 73.0396°E
- Country: India
- State: Maharashtra
- District: Thane

Government
  - Type: Government of Maharashtra
  - Body: Grampanchayat

Population (2001)
  - Total: 12,933

Languages
  - Official: Marathi
- Time zone: UTC+5:30 (IST)

Karivali is a census town in the Thane district in the Indian state of Maharashtra. Karivali is located nearly 55 km (34 mi) to the northeast of the Mumbai city center. Karivali is known for its many Hindu temples, namely the Hanuman temple, which is surrounded by a large pitch and an attached gym known as the "Jay Bajarang Vyayam Mandir", used for ceremonies and sports events.

Kamvari Lake is the main lake streaming beside the town along with many other ponds. The village has a governing body (Grampanchayat) consisting of seventeen members.

== Demographics ==
As of the 2001 India census, Karivali had a population of 12,933. Males made up 77% of the population and females 23%. Karivali has a literacy rate of 71%, higher than the national average of 59.5%. Male literacy is 77%, and female literacy is 53%. In Karivali, 10% of the population is under six years old.
