= Congress (Secular) =

Indian political party

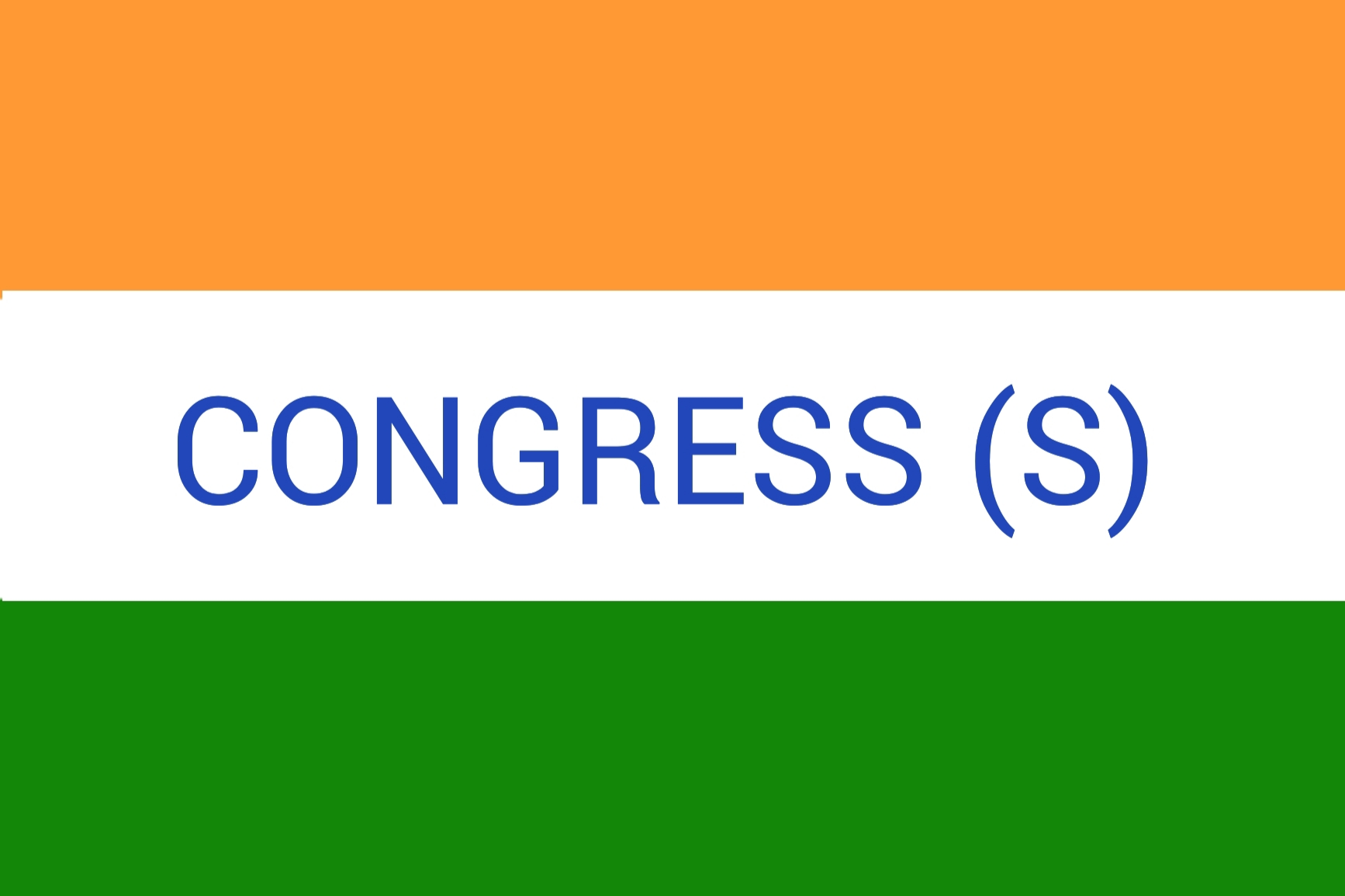
- Abbreviation: Cong(S)
- Leader: Kadannappalli Ramachandran
- President: Kadannappalli Ramachandran
- Secretary: V. K. Babu
- Founded: 1978
- Dissolved: 2026
- Split from: Nationalist Congress Party
- Merged into: Congress Socialist Party
- Headquarters: Ram Raj Bhavan, Manikkath Road, Cochin, Kerala-16.
- Alliance: Left Democratic Front (LDF)
- Number of states and union territories in government: 0 / 31

Congress (Secular) was a political party in Kerala, India. It is a residual faction of Indian Congress (Socialist) that was formed in 1978. It was part of Left Democratic Front in Kerala. In 2026, the party is merged with Nationalist Congress Party (Secular) to form a new party Congress Socialist Party.

== History ==
In 1980 A. K. Antony part of Congress (A) left Indian Congress (Socialist) and gave support to LDF. In 1982, when Antony rejoined Indian National Congress a faction of Congress (A) rebelled and stayed with LDF as Congress (S). This included MLAs such as P. C. Chacko, A. K. Saseendran, and Kadannappalli Ramachandran etc.

In 2001, for a brief period Congress (S) merged with Nationalist Congress Party. In 2003, Kadannappalli Ramachandran left NCP and reconstituted the party.

In 2026, Kadannappalli Ramachandran announced that the party is merged with NCP-SP to form Congress Socialist Party.

== Legislative presence ==
It had one MLA in the 15th Kerala Legislative Assembly, Kadannappalli Ramachandran from Kannur district and has no Member of parliament in any house.

== Electoral performance ==
Kerala Legislative Assembly election results
Election Year	Alliance	Seats contested	Seats won	Total Votes	Percentage of votes	+/- Vote
2006	LDF	1	1 / 140	72,579	0.47%	New
2011	LDF	1	0 / 140	48,984	0.28%	▼0.19%
2016	LDF	1	1 / 140	54,347	0.27%	▼0.01%
2021	LDF	1	1 / 140	60,313	0.29%	▲0.02%
2026	LDF	1	0 / 140	52,069	0.24%	▼0.05%

== See also ==
- Indian Congress (Socialist)
