= Congress Socialist Party (2026) =

- Abbreviation: CSP
- President: Kadannappalli Ramachandran
- Founded: 25 October 2026
- Merger of: Nationalist Congress Party (Secular); Congress (Secular)
- Ideology: Democratic socialism Left-wing nationalism Anti-imperialism
- Political position: Centre-left to left-wing
- Alliance: Left Democratic Front

Party flag

Congress Socialist Party is an democratic socialist political party in India. It was officially formed on 25 October 2026 by the merger of Nationalist Congress Party (Secular) and Congress (Secular).

== Background ==
Following the defeat of Left Democratic Front in 2026 Kerala Legislative Assembly election, smaller socialist constituents of the LDF initiated talks for unification.

In the meantime, A. K. Saseendran and Thomas K. Thomas left Nationalist Congress Party (Sharadchandra Pawar) alleging that the national leadership of the party was getting closer to Bharatiya Janata Party compromising its secular stand and Kerala unit leader P. C. Chacko was violating internal democracy with authorisation tendency and then formed a new party named Nationalist Congress Party (Secular).

NCP(S) held talks with Congress (Secular) led by Kadannappalli Ramachandran. On 25 September, they announced the merger of two parties although the exact name of the new party was not still decided. On 23-25 October, two parties had unity conference and Congress Socialist Party was formally announced.
