= Rupesh Laxman Mhatre =

Indian politician

Rupesh Mhatre

Member of Legislative Assembly of Maharashtra
- In office 2014–2019
- Succeeded by: Rais Shaikh
- Constituency: Bhiwandi East
- In office 2010–2014
- Constituency: Bhiwandi East

Personal details
- Born: 3 August
- Party: Shiv Sena

Rupesh Laxman Mhatre is a member of the 13th Maharashtra Legislative Assembly. He represents the Bhiwandi East Assembly Constituency as member of Shiv Sena. He is a Shiv Sena politician from Thane district, Maharashtra.

== Positions held ==
- 2010: Elected to Maharashtra Legislative Assembly (1st term)
- 2014: Re-Elected to Maharashtra Legislative Assembly (2nd term)
- 2015: Scheduled Tribes Welfare Committee (अनुसूचित जमाती कल्याण समिती) Pramukh Maharashtra Vidhan Mandal

== See also ==
- Bhiwandi Lok Sabha constituency
