= Rais Shaikh =

Indian politician

Member of the Maharashtra Legislative Assembly
- Incumbent
- Assumed office 2019
- Preceded by: Rupesh Laxman Mhatre
- Constituency: Bhiwandi East

Municipal Councillor in the BMC
- In office 2012–2017
- Constituency: Govandi (Ward No. 132)

Secretary & Spokesperson of Samajwadi Party for Mumbai
- Incumbent
- Assumed office 2010

Personal details
- Born: 1 June 1974 (age 52) Mumbai, Maharashtra, India
- Party: Samajwadi Party
- Spouse: Atiya Shaikh
- Children: Bushra Rais Shaikh
- Education: University of Mumbai
- Website: www.raisshaikh.in

Rais Kasam Shaikh (born 1 June 1974) is an Indian politician from Mumbai, India. He is a 2 term member of Maharashtra Legislative Assembly representing the constituency of Bhiwandi East. He has been the Municipal Councilor and also the Group Leader of the Samajwadi Party. He contested in and won the BMC elections from Govandi in 2012 and Nagpada in 2017. Shaikh was amongst the top 10 corporators in Mumbai as per a survey by Mumbai Mirror.

In 2019 Maharashtra Legislative Assembly election Rais Shaikh won the Bhiwandi East seat by 45,133 votes. He won against Rupesh Laxman Mhatre of Shiv Sena and Santosh Shetty of Congress.

In the 2024 Maharashtra Legislative Assembly election, Rais Shaikh was re-elected from the Bhiwandi East constituency, securing 119,687 votes (62.44%) and defeating Shiv Sena candidate Santosh Shetty by a margin of 52,015 votes. This marked his second consecutive term as MLA from the constituency.

== Early life and education ==
Rais Shaikh was born on 1 June 1974 in the Mandvi suburb of Mumbai, Maharashtra, into a middle-class family. His father, Kasam Shaikh, and mother, Zainab Shaikh, raised seven sons, with Rais being the second youngest. He completed his early education at Dawoodbhoy Fazalbhoy High School and pursued higher studies at Lala Lajpatrai College in Mumbai. He later graduated with a Bachelor of Commerce degree from Sydenham College of Commerce and Economics, affiliated with the University of Mumbai.

== Career ==
Rais started his career as a computer teacher and later worked at a printing press in Mumbai soon after completing his graduation. Between 2002-07, he was based in Dubai and trying to build a career there. In his free time, he would do translation work for NGOs based in Mumbai. That served as an awakening for him. He moved back to India and decided to work towards the betterment of society as an activist.

== Political life ==
Rais embarked upon his political career in the year 2007 by joining the Samajwadi Party.

=== Civic Issues ===
Shaikh has worked to maintain and construct dilapidated roads, fix water shortage problems not only in his ward but the entire area of Govandi. He has multiple goals that include providing digital classrooms to all schools, setting up technology to enable virtual autopsies in post-mortem centers and has proposed to provide online birth and death certificates and underground parking below open spaces in South Mumbai. Shaikh's Ahtesaab Foundation has provided the first digital classroom of this city to a School in Govandi. He believes that there is a need to do something about the traffic congestion in Mumbai and hence suggested to start Mini Bus services. He has also presented a program to improve slum infrastructure.

=== Education ===
An English medium school run by BMC with support from NGO Ahtesaab to serve the growing needs of parents in the area who wanted to send their children to an English medium school. He introduced Digital Learning where he developed 2 classrooms each in Govandi and Madanpura as modern digital classrooms. He also proposed the Semi English format of Education in BMC and introduced an all-English School by the name of Umar Rajjab Public School.

=== Healthcare ===
In 2018, Rais Shaikh, as a councilor, sanctioned two crores and seventy-five lacs to renovate the Mukti Fauj Dawakhana (Salvation Army Dispensary), one of the oldest dispensaries in the city.

=== Stance Against Drugs ===
On September 9, 2018, Rais Shaikh led a rally with party members and people from his constituency to protest against the illegal sale and consumption of drugs. The rally covered different areas like Madanpura, Nagpada, and Byculla.

=== Demand for a Pay Hike For Corporators ===
Rais asked for a hike in the salaries of corporators in May 2017. He demanded corporators to be paid a salary of Rs. 50, 000. At that time, corporators were being paid a salary of Rs. 10, 000. A corporator, as a part of his or her duty, has to be on the move all the time and has to meet people from different areas on a regular basis to address their problems. While condemning corruption in politics, Rais stated that corporators must be paid the kind of amount that would not at least not make them worried about managing their personal expenses.

=== Women Empowerment and Safety ===
Rais advocated the implementation of some measures with the help of which the situation can be improved. Rais and his team carried out an initiative called ‘Police Didi’ under which four female constables spoke to the girls and the women in these areas. Several men were arrested because of the testimonies by these women. Rais has demanded the formation of a monitoring committee for the police budget.

=== Poverty Advocacy ===
In May 2019, Shaikh was able to help several families who were living in slums to apply for housing aid from the government. The families were issued with allotment letters and given flats in different areas.

=== Condemnation on 2020 Hathras Gang Rape and Murder ===
Rais Shaikh strongly criticized the gang rape and murder incident that took place in Hathras district in Uttar Pradesh. In an interview, Rais criticized the ruling government of Uttar Pradesh sharply and stated that the cover-up that happened after the incident was a glaring example of the incompetence of the government.

=== Burial Controversy During Covid-19 ===
On March 30, 2020, Municipal Commissioner Praveen Pardeshi stated that people who die of Coronavirus should be cremated and not buried, irrespective of their religion. Asif Zakaria, corporator from Bandra, informed Rais about this advisory. There was a vague line in the advisory which states that those who want to bury their relatives or family members should go out of Mumbai. Rais opposed this and said it was unreasonable and highly discriminatory against one religion. The circular was amended and the revised version which was published stated that dead bodies can be buried in crematoriums.

=== One-rupee Clinic ===
Rais introduced the concept of a one-rupee clinic in Bhiwandi and also initiated a door to door campaign right from the early days of the pandemic hitting the country. Under this campaign, the oxygen level of every individual was examined. All the other necessary tests to check the symptoms of Covid-19 were done. After doing these tests, one could see the result in 15 minutes.

== Social Work and Ahtesaab Foundation ==
=== Aanchal: Maternity Care Program ===
Aanchal is an initiative by Ahtesaab Foundation focused on supporting maternal health among underprivileged women in Bhiwandi. It provides basic prenatal care, nutritional support, and pregnancy-related awareness.

=== Health Camps and Cataract Treatment ===
Ahtesaab Foundation conducts monthly health camps in Bhiwandi, offering free check-ups and follow-up consultations for early detection of medical issues. The foundation also facilitates free cataract surgeries for senior citizens, addressing the high cost barrier to treatment.

=== Jashn-E-Taleem: Annual Student Festival ===
Jashn-E-Taleem is an annual educational festival organized by Ahtesaab Foundation, offering students from Bhiwandi a platform to participate in various competitions such as quiz, calligraphy, singing, and rangoli. The event promotes self-expression, creativity, and inter-school engagement across academic levels.

=== Support for BNCMC Schools ===
Ahtesaab Foundation has provided basic infrastructure to five BNCMC schools, including benches, fans, and computer labs. School Nos. 22 and 62 were fully renovated with a library, science labs, and a multipurpose turf. The foundation has also conducted student eye camps, distributed 306 pairs of shoes, and provided over 80,000 books across 67 schools.

=== Women Achievers Award ===
As part of the Jashn-E-Taleem program, Ahtesaab Foundation confers the Women Achievers Award to recognize women who have successfully launched and sustained small businesses, promoting entrepreneurship and self-reliance.

=== Women Self-Help Groups ===
Ahtesaab Foundation has facilitated the formation of 12 self-help groups (SHGs) and the Rais Area Level Federation in Bhiwandi. Initially formed by housewives, these groups have evolved into community-led enterprises, enabling women to engage in small-scale business activities and entrepreneurship.
