= Vishwanath Bhoir =

Indian politician

Member of the Maharashtra Legislative Assembly
- Incumbent
- Assumed office October 2019
- Preceded by: Narendra Pawar
- Constituency: Kalyan West

Personal details
- Party: Shiv Sena

Vishwanath Bhoir is a politician from Kalyan, Maharashtra. He is a Member of Maharashtra Legislative Assembly from Kalyan West Vidhan Sabha constituency as a member of the Shiv Sena.

== Positions held ==
- 2019: Elected to Maharashtra Legislative Assembly
