= Rupesh Kumar Singh =

Indian journalist

- Occupation: Journalist
- Organization: Independent
- Known for: reporting of persecution of tribal people
- Spouse: Ipsa Shatakshi

Rupesh Kumar Singh is a journalist from Jharkhand who is known for his reporting on Human rights violation and persecution of tribal people. In 2021 during the Pegasus Project revelations in India his phone number (including those of his two family members) were found in the list of potential targets for state surveillance by Pegasus (spyware). Rupesh claimed that the Union government of India had been targeting him for his reporting on violence by the security forces against the tribal people. He along with four other journalists targeted by the spyware moved the Supreme Court of India, seeking a mechanism for judicial oversight and punishments for the officials involved.

== Personal life ==
Rupesh is married to Ipsa Shatakshi who is a social activist working on tribal issues. She and her sister were also targeted by the Pegasus spyware.

== Pegasus spyware ==
Rupesh reported on the displacement of tribals, suppression of tribal rights and the arrest of the tribals on false charges after branding them Maoists. He believed his reporting made him the target of surveillance by Pegasus software and also led to his arrest by the Bihar Police in June 2019 under the Unlawful Activities (Prevention) Act (UAPA). Rupesh alleged that the security forces had tried to coax him to stop reporting, after failing to convince him they planted gelatin sticks and detonators in his car in his presence and then arrested him for the same. Bihar police failed to file a chargesheet in his case even after the completion of stipulated 180 days since the filing of the complaint. He spent six months in jail and was released on bail in December 2019 from the Gaya jail since no chargesheet was filed.

== Arresting ==
On 17 July 2022, Singh was arrested by Jharkhand Police from his residence in Ramgarh district. His laptop phones among other belongings were also seized. His wife Shatakshi said that Singh was being targeted as he had recently published reports on morbidity in villages due to industrial pollutants.
