= Nationalist Congress Party – Sharadchandra Pawar =

Political party in India

- Abbreviation: NCP–SP
- President: Sharad Pawar
- Secretary: Rohit Rajendra Pawar
- General Secretary: Jayant Patil; Shashikant Shinde
- Parliamentary Chairperson: Sharad Pawar
- Rajya Sabha Leader: Sharad Pawar
- Lok Sabha Leader: Supriya Sule
- Founder: Sharadchandra Pawar
- Founded: 8 February 2024 (2 years ago)
- Split from: Nationalist Congress Party
- Headquarters: 81, Lodhi Estate, New Delhi
- Student wing: Sonia Duhan
- Women's wing: Rohini Khadse-Khewalkar
- Ideology: Marathi nationalism
- Political position: Centre
- Colours: Blue
- ECI status: State Party
- Alliance: INDIA (National); MVA (Maharashtra); LDF (Kerala)
- Seats in Rajya Sabha: 1 / 245
- Seats in Lok Sabha: 8 / 543
- Seats in Maharashtra Legislative Council: 3 / 78
- Seats in State Legislative Assemblies: Indian states 10 / 288 (Maharashtra)
- Number of states and union territories in government: 0 / 31

Election symbol
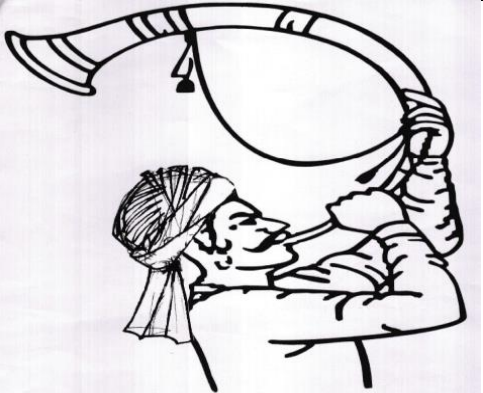

Party flag
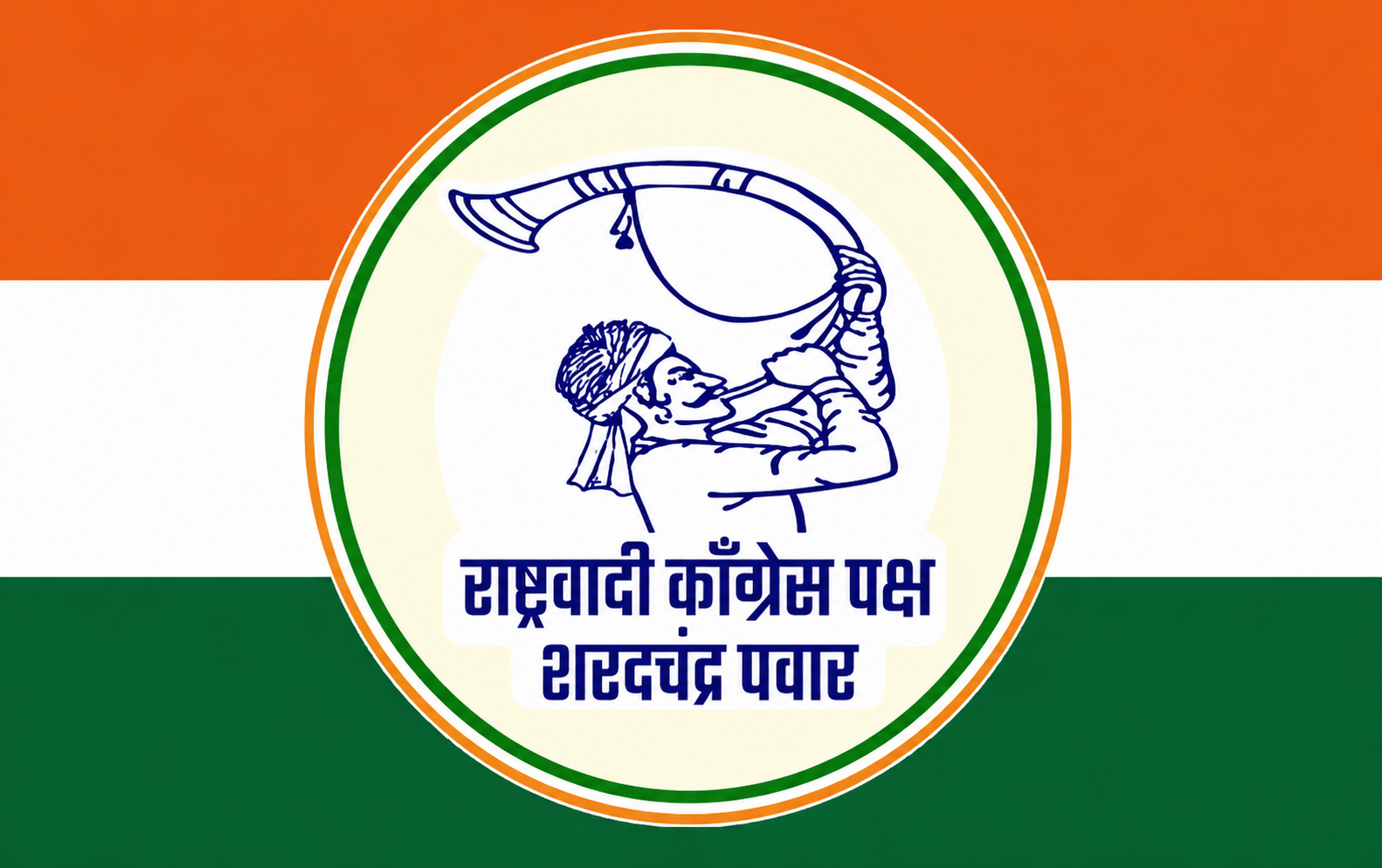

Website
- ncpsp.org

The Nationalist Congress Party – Sharadchandra Pawar (NCP–SP) is a political party in India formed under the leadership of Sharadchandra Pawar (commonly known as Sharad Pawar). It was formed after the Election Commission of India (ECI) recognised the group led by his nephew Ajit Pawar as the original Nationalist Congress Party.

== History ==
In July 2023, Ajit Pawar, along with 40 MLAs, left the Sharad Pawar-led Nationalist Congress Party and joined the ruling Shiv Sena – BJP government as Deputy Chief Minister of Maharashtra. This caused the split in NCP. On 7 February 2024, ECI awarded the party name and symbol to the faction headed by Ajit Pawar. The faction led by Sharad Pawar got a new name "Nationalist Congress Party (Sharadchandra Pawar)". In 2026, Kerala state unit of the party split, resulting in the formation of the Nationalist Congress Party (Secular). The breakaway faction subsequently merged with Congress (Secular) to form a new party Congress Socialist Party.

== Party symbol ==
ECI has allotted "a man blowing tura (trumpet)" (in Marathi तुतारी वाजवणारा माणूस) as symbol to the party.

== Party flag ==
The flag of the Nationalist Congress Party – Sharadchandra Pawar after the split contains its logo and the Indian flag.

== Electoral performance ==
=== Lok Sabha (General) election results ===
Election	Lok sabha	Party leader	Pre-poll alliance	Seats contested	Seats won	+/- in seats	Overall Vote	Vote %	Vote swing	Ref.
2024	16th	Sharad Pawar	INDIA	11	8 / 543	New entry	5,921,162	0.92%	New entry	

=== State assembly election results ===
Election	Party leader	Pre-poll alliance	Seats contested	Seats won	+/- in seats	Overall vote	Vote %	Vote swing	Sitting side
Maharashtra
2024	Sharad Pawar	MVA	86	10 / 288	New entry	7,287,797	11.28%	New entry	Opposition

== List of Lok Sabha members ==
Name	Constituency	Year	Portrait			
Name	Constituency	Year	Portrait	Supriya Sule	Baramati	2024
Amar Sharadrao Kale	Wardha					2024
Bhaskar Bhagare	Dindori	Bhaskar Bhagare				2024
Suresh Mhatre	Bhiwandi					2024
Nilesh Dnyandev Lanke	Ahmednagar					2024
Dr. Amol Kolhe	Shirur					2024
Dhairyasheel Mohite-Patil	Madha					2024
Bajrang Sonwane	Beed					2024

== List of Rajya Sabha members ==
Name	Portrait	State	Term in office	
Name	Portrait	State	Appointment date	Retirement date
Sharad Pawar		Maharashtra	3 April 2026	April 2032

== List of Members of Legislative Council ==
Maharashtra Legislative Council
Election Year	Portrait	MLCs	Constituency
2020		Eknath Khadse	Elected by Members of Legislative Assembly
2020		Arun Lad	Elected from Graduate Constituencies

== List of Members of Legislative Assembly ==
=== List of Members of Maharashtra Legislative Assembly ===
Maharashtra Legislative Assembly
15th Maharashtra Assembly
Election Year	Portrait	MLA	Constituency
2024		Jayant Patil	Islampur
2024		Jitendra Awhad	Mumbra-Kalwa
2024		Rohit Patil	Tasgaon-Kavathe Mahankal
2024		Uttamrao Jankar	Malshiras
2024		Raju Khare	Mohol
2024		Abhijeet Dhananjay Patil	Madha
2024		Narayan Patil	Karmala
2024		Sandeep Kshirsagar	Beed
2024		Rohit Rajendra Pawar	Karjat Jamkhed
2024		Bapusaheb Pathare	Vadgaon

=== List of Members of Kerala Legislative Assembly ===
Kerala Legislative Assembly
Election Year	Portrait	MLAs	Constituency

== See also ==
- Politics of India
- List of political parties in India
- Nationalist Congress Party
- Politics of Maharashtra
- Politics of Kerala
- Indian National Developmental Inclusive Alliance
- Maha Vikas Aghadi
