= Suresh Mhatre =

Indian politician and Bhiwandi businessman (b. 1971)

Member of Parliament, Lok Sabha
- Incumbent
- Assumed office 16 June 2024
- Preceded by: Kapil M. Patil
- Constituency: Bhiwandi
- Majority: 66,121

Personal details
- Born: 15 June 1970 (age 56) Gundavali Village, Bhiwandi, Thane, Maharashtra, India
- Party: Nationalist Congress Party (Sharadchandra Pawar) (since 2023); Nationalist Congress Party (until 2023)
- Spouse: Sharada
- Parent(s): Gopinath Mhatre, Rekha Mhatre
- Education: B.N.N. College (1989)
- Occupation: Politician, Businessman
- Nickname: Balya Mama

Suresh Gopinath Mhatre also known by locals as Balya Mama is an Indian politician and businessman from Maharashtra, who has been serving as a member of Lok Sabha from Bhiwandi seat since 2024.

== Early life and career ==
Mhatre was born in 1970 in Bhiwandi, Maharashtra. He completed his school education at Parshuram Dhondu Tavre School in 1987 and his higher education in BNN college in 1989.

Mhatre is associated with construction business. He represents from Agri community.

== Political career ==
Mhatre was associated with Maharashtra Navnirman Sena (MNS) in early politics. In 2014, he contested from Bhiwandi seat under MNS ticket but lost to BJP business rival Kapil Patil by receiving 93000 votes only. Later he switched to Shiv Sena.

In 2019, Mhatre was denied of getting the same seat. In April 2019, he nominated himself as independent candidate to contest but later withdrawn under pressure from Chief Minister Devendra Fadnavis.

After that, Mhatre switched to NCP. In 2022, he served as rural district president of the Nationalist Congress Party of Sharad faction in Thane.

Suresh Mhatre won the 2024 General election form Bhiwandi Lokshabha seat and won by 66121 votes against the seating MP Kapil Patil from BJP.

== Member of Lok Sabha ==
In 2024, he was nominated as NCP(SP) candidate. Following on that, Mumbai Metropolitan Region Development Authority (MMRDA) officials arrived with police force to take action at his company RK Lodgy World Warehouse Complex without issuing any notice.

According to his manifesto, he promises to connect Bhiwandi to Mumbai by starting a direct local train from Bhiwandi Road Railway Station to CSMT station. He was elected from Bhiwandi by defeating Patil with the majority of 66,121 votes.
