= 2026 Brihanmumbai Municipal Corporation election =

- 15 January 2026

All 227 seats in Brihanmumbai Municipal Corporation 114 seats needed for a majority
- Turnout: 52.94% (▼2.59 pp)
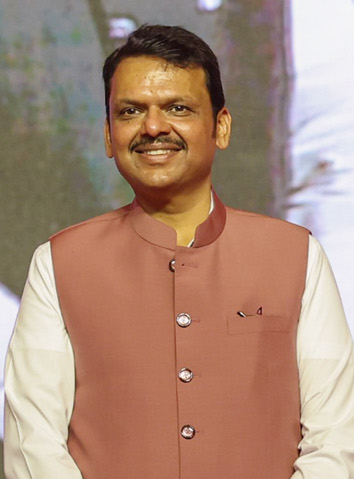

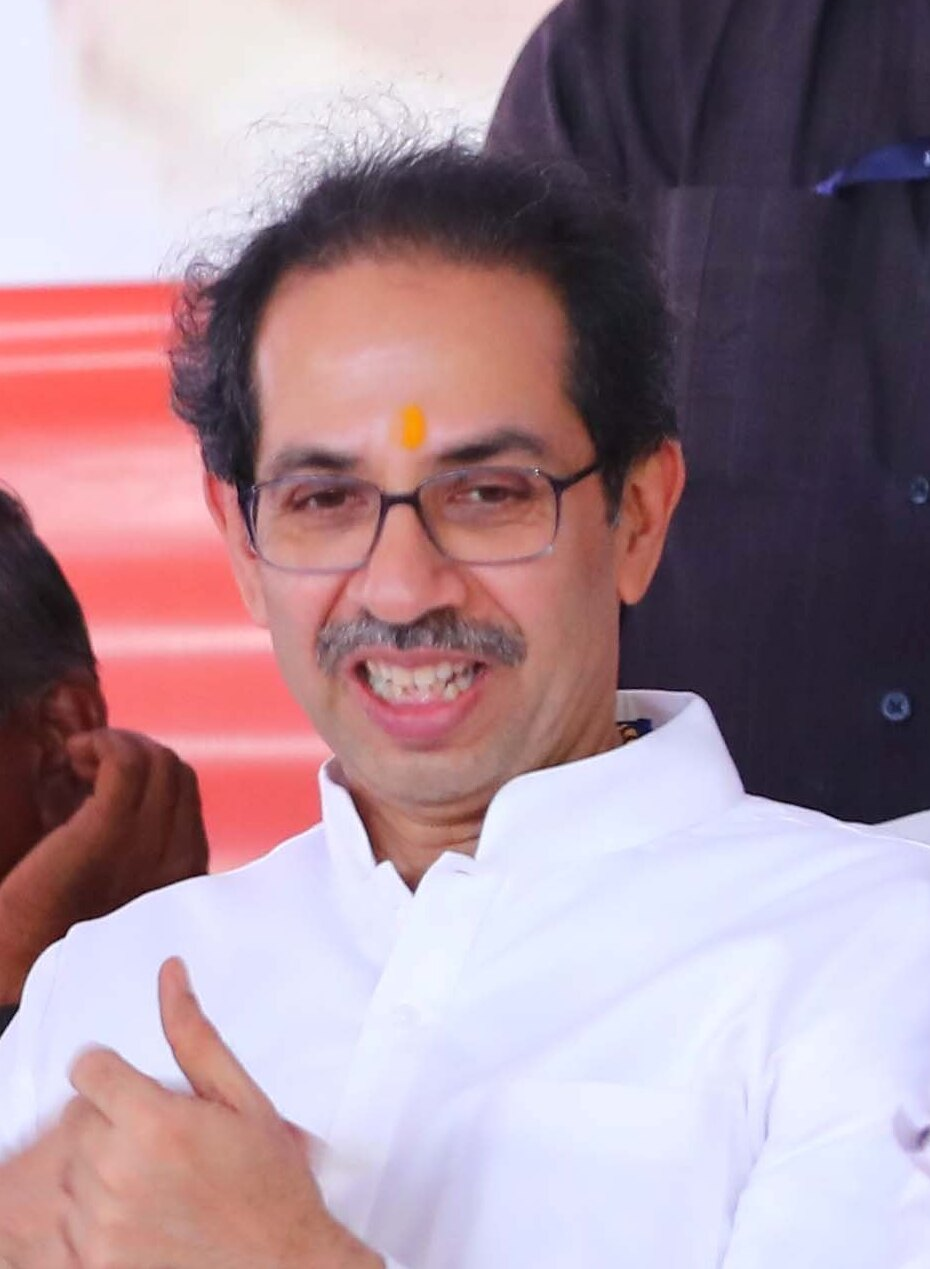

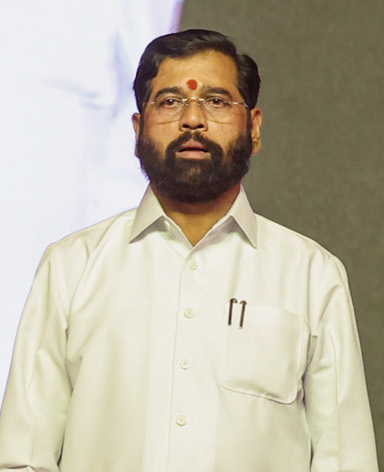

	First party	Second party
Leader	Devendra Fadnavis	Uddhav Thackeray
Party	BJP	SS(UBT)
Alliance	MY	SS (UBT) - MNS - NCP (SP)
Last election	82	New Party
Seats won	89	65
Seat change	▲7	New
Popular vote	1,179,273	717,736
Percentage	45.22%	27.52%
	Third party	Fourth party
Leader	Eknath Shinde	Harshwardhan Sapkal
Party	SHS	INC
Alliance	MY	MVA
Last election	New Party	31
Seats won	29	24
Seat change	New	▼7
Popular vote	273,326	242,646
Percentage	10.48%	9.31%
BMC majority before election
SHS
Elected BMC majority
BJP

The 2026 Brihanmumbai Municipal Corporation election took place on 15 January 2026 to elect members to the Brihanmumbai Municipal Corporation of Greater Mumbai, the second largest city in India. Voting lasted one day and the results were released on 16 January.

The Bharatiya Janata Party-led Maha Yuti alliance secured a simple majority. The BJP emerged as the single largest party winning 89 seats on its own. Following the elections, Ritu Tawde of the BJP was elected as the Mayor of Mumbai.

== Background ==
=== Four-member ward system (except BMC) ===
The Maharashtra government implemented a four-member ward system for most municipal corporations in the state, with the exception of the Brihanmumbai Municipal Corporation (BMC). While the ruling parties stated that the move would strengthen democracy, the opposition expressed concerns about delays in civic elections and questioned why the administration had not approached the court to expedite the election process.

=== Updates on BMC ward boundaries ===
- Rectified boundaries: The BMC submitted a final draft of revised boundaries for its 227 electoral wards to the State Election Commission (SEC). Approximately 20–25% of ward boundaries were modified, affecting around 60 wards.
- Reasons for changes:
  - Updates were made based on additions and deletions in voter lists.
  - Boundary changes reflected population shifts caused by redevelopment, infrastructure projects, and slum rehabilitation schemes.

The Brihanmumbai Municipal Corporation has 24 administrative wards, which are further divided into 227 electoral wards (constituencies) for elections. Each ward has its own officer responsible for local administration and services. The ward boundaries were redrawn in early 2025.

=== Process of delimitation ===
- Directives from SEC: In August, the State Election Commission instructed municipal corporations to begin the delimitation process for ward boundaries.
- Criteria for changes:
  - Adjustments were based on population changes reflected in updated census data.
  - Boundary modifications were triggered when a constituency's population changed by more than 10%.
- Public input: After approval of the draft by the SEC, suggestions and objections from the public were invited.

=== Population and wards ===
- Population basis: Each ward is designed to have approximately 54,000 residents. Adjustments accounted for population growth in suburban areas and a decline in the island city.
- Impact on corporators: Delimitation resulted in the division of some suburban wards into four parts, affecting representation.

== Schedule ==
=== Ward Structure Event ===
Structure Event	Schedule
Draft Ward Structure	1 February 2023
Objections and Suggestion	14 February 2023
Final draft will be Submitted	2 March 2023

=== Poll Event ===
Poll Event	Schedule
Notification	15 December 2025
Last Date for filing nomination	30 December 2025
Scrutiny of Nominations	31 December 2025
Withdrawal of Candidature	2 January 2026
Date of Poll	15 January 2026
Date of Counting	16 January 2026

== Parties and alliances ==
Party		Flag	Symbols	Leader	Seats contested
BJP + SHS (Note: The alliance has no candidate in 3 wards.)	Bharatiya Janata Party				135 (Note: Two BJP candidate's nominations from Wards 211 and 212 were rejected.) (Note: BJP and SHS will have friendly fight in Ward 225.)
BJP + SHS	Shiv Sena				89 (Note: BJP and SHS will have friendly fight in Ward 225.)
SS(UBT) + MNS + NCP(SP) (Note: The alliance has no candidate in 3 wards.)	Shiv Sena (Uddhav Balasaheb Thackeray)				160 (Note: SS(UBT) and NCP(SP) will have friendly fight in Ward 140 and Ward 179.)
SS(UBT) + MNS + NCP(SP)	Maharashtra Navnirman Sena				53 (Note: MNS and NCP(SP) will have friendly fight in Ward 175.)
SS(UBT) + MNS + NCP(SP)	Nationalist Congress Party (Sharadchandra Pawar)				11 (Note: SS(UBT) and NCP(SP) will have friendly fight in Ward 140 and Ward 179.) (Note: MNS and NCP(SP) will have friendly fight in Ward 175.)
INC + VBA + RSPS (Note: The alliance does not have any candidate in 28 wards.)	Indian National Congress				151
INC + VBA + RSPS	Vanchit Bahujan Aaghadi				46
INC + VBA + RSPS	Rashtriya Samaj Paksha				2
Nationalist Congress Party					37
Communist Party of India (Marxist)					9
All India Majlis-e-Ittehadul Muslimeen					
Samajwadi Party					30

== Candidates ==
Ward	BJP + SHS		SS(UBT) + MNS + NCP(SP)		INC + VBA + RSPS	
No.	Party	Candidate	Party	Candidate	Party	Candidate
1	SHS	Rekha Yadav	SS(UBT)	Foram Parmar	INC	Sheetal Ashok Mhatre
2	BJP	Tejaswi Ghosalkar	SS(UBT)	Dhanashree Kolge	INC	Menaka Girish Singh
3	BJP	Prakash Darekar	SS(UBT)	Roshni Gaikwad	INC	Pradeep Chaubey
4	SHS	Mangesh Pangare	SS(UBT)	Raju Mulla	INC	Rahul Vishwakarma
5	SHS	Sanjay Ghadi	SS(UBT)	Sujata Patekar	INC	Narendra Kumar Sharma
6	SHS	Diksha Karkar	SS(UBT)	Sanjana Vengurlekar	— (Note: No candidate was put up by INC in Ward 6.)	
7	BJP	Ganesh Khankar	SS(UBT)	Saurabh Ghosalkar	INC	Ashish Fernandes
8	BJP	Yogita Patil	MNS	Kasturi Rohekar	INC	Ratnaprabha Junnarkar
9	BJP	Shivanand Shetty	SS(UBT)	Sanjay Bhosale	INC	Sadunand Chavan
10	BJP	Jitendra Patel	MNS	Vijay Krishna Patil	INC	Avinash Sankhe
11	SHS	Dr. Aditi Khursange	MNS	Kavita Mane	— (Note: No candidate was put up by INC in Wards 11, 12, 13, 14, 15 and 16.)	
12	SHS	Suvarna Gavas	SS(UBT)	Sarika Jhore	—	
13	BJP	Rani Trivedi	SS(UBT)	Ashawari Patil	—	
14	BJP	Seema Shinde	MNS	Pooja Mainkar	—	
15	BJP	Jignasa Shah	SS(UBT)	Jayshree Bangera	—	
16	BJP	Shweta Korgaonkar	SS(UBT)	Swati Borkar	—	
17	BJP	Shilpa Sangore	SS(UBT)	Ashwini Sarfare	INC	Sangeeta Kadam
18	SHS	Sandhya Doshi	MNS	Sadichha More	— (Note: No candidate was put up by INC in Wards 18 and 19.)	
19	BJP	Dakshata Kaothankar	SS(UBT)	Leena Gudekar	—	
20	BJP	Deepak Tawde	MNS	Dinesh Salvi	INC	Mastan Ishtiaq Khan
21	BJP	Leena Deherkar	MNS	Sonali Dev Mishra	— (Note: No candidate was put up by INC in Ward 21.)	
22	BJP	Himanshu Parekh	SS(UBT)	Ashish Patil	INC	Pradeep Kothari
23	BJP	Shiv Kumar Jha	MNS	Kiran Jadhav	INC	Rajendra Pratap Pandey
24	BJP	Swati Jaiswal	SS(UBT)	Mukta Patel	VBA	Saroj Magar
25	BJP	Nisha Parulekar	SS(UBT)	Yogesh Janardhan Bhoir	— (Note: No candidate was put up by INC in Ward 25.)	
26	BJP	Pritam Pandagale	SS(UBT)	Dharmendra Kale	INC	Suresh Chandra Rajhans
27	BJP	Neelam Gurav	MNS	Asha Vishnu Chander	VBA	Sangeeta Shingade
28	SHS	Vrushali Hundare	SS(UBT)	Prajakta Kokane	INC	Ajanta Yadav
29	BJP	Nitin Chauhan	SS(UBT)	Sachin Patil	INC	Dev Kumar Kanojia
30	BJP	Dhaval Vora	SS(UBT)	Diwakar Patil	— (Note: No candidate was put up by INC in Ward 30.)	
31	BJP	Manisha Yadav	SS(UBT)	Jyoti More	INC	Beena Singh
32	SHS	Manali Bhandari	SS(UBT)	Geeta Bhandari	INC	Sireena Zicco Kinny
33	BJP	Ujjwala Vaiti	SS(UBT)	Sarika Parte	INC	Mohammad Moeen Siddique
34	BJP	John Dennis	SS(UBT)	Vikas Dashpute	INC	Hyder Aslam Shaikh
34	SHS	Vijay Mahadik	SS(UBT)	Vikas Dashpute	INC	Hyder Aslam Shaikh
35	BJP	Yogesh Verma	SS(UBT)	Deepak More	INC	Parag Shah
36	BJP	Siddharth Sharma	MNS	Prashant Mahadik	INC	Sanjay Nagrecha
37	BJP	Pratibha Shinde	SS(UBT)	Yogita Prashant	INC	Meena Dubey
38	SHS	Rishita Chache	MNS	Surekha Parab	VBA	Tejaswini Gaikwad
39	SHS	Vinay Sawant	SS(UBT)	Pushpa Kalambe	INC	Madhu Singh
40	BJP	Sanjay Awhad	SS(UBT)	Tulsiram Shinde	RSPS	Aditya Yadav
41	SHS	Mansi Pavaskar	SS(UBT)	Suhas Wadkar	INC	Rahul Ugale
42	SHS	Dhanshree Bharadkar	SS(UBT)	Pranita Nikum	VBA	Manisha Surve
43	BJP	Vinod Mishra	NCP-SP	Ajit Raorane	INC	Sudarshan Fulchand Soni
44	BJP	Sangeeta Sharma	SS(UBT)	Saili Sakpal	INC	Savitri Yadav
45	BJP	Sanjay Kamble	SS(UBT)	Neerav Barote	INC	Ramesh Bharat Yadav
46	BJP	Yogita Koli	MNS	Snehita Sandesh	—	
47	BJP	Tajinder Singh Tiwana	SS(UBT)	Shankar Gurav	INC	Parminder Singh Bhamra
48	SHS	Salma Almekar	NCP-SP	Ganesh Shinde	INC	Rafiq Eliyas Shaikh
49	BJP	Sumitra Mhatre	SS(UBT)	Sangeeta Sutar	INC	Sangeeta Koli
50	BJP	Vikram Rajput	SS(UBT)	Tanvi Rao	INC	Sameer Balaram Mungekar
51	SHS	Varsha Tembvalkar	NCP-SP	Arti Chavan	INC	Rekha DIlip Singh
52	BJP	Preeti Satam	SS(UBT)	Supriya Gadhave	INC	Swati Eknath Sangle
53	SHS	Ashok Khandve	SS(UBT)	Jitendra Valvi	VBA	Nitin Valvi
54	BJP	Viplav Avsare	SS(UBT)	Ankit Prabhu	VBA	Rahul Thoke
55	BJP	Harsh Patel	MNS	Shailendra More	INC	Chetan Bhatt
56	BJP	Rajul Desai	SS(UBT)	Lakshmi Bhatia	VBA	Usha Tirpude
57	BJP	Shrikala Pillay	SS(UBT)	Rohan Shinde	INC	Gaurav Arun Rane
58	BJP	Sandeep Patel	MNS	Virendra Jadhav	INC	Suryakant Mishra
59	BJP	Yogita Dabhadkar	SS(UBT)	Shailesh Phanse	INC	Jayesh Ramdas Sandhe
60	BJP	Sayali Kulkarni	SS(UBT)	Meghna Vishal Mane	INC	Gladys Shriyar
61	SHS	Rajul Patel	SS(UBT)	Sejal Dayanand Sawant	INC	Divya Avaneesh Singh
62	SHS	Raju Pednekar	SS(UBT)	Zeeshan Changez Multani	INC	Saif Ahad Khan
63	BJP	Rupesh Savarkar	SS(UBT)	Devendra Amberkar	INC	Priyanka Ganpat Sanap
64	BJP	Sarita Rajpure	SS(UBT)	Saba Harun Khan	INC	Huda Adam Shaikh Khan
65	BJP	Vitthal Banderi	SS(UBT)	Prasad Ayre	INC	Sufiyan Haider
66	BJP	Arti Pandya	SS(UBT)	Isa Mohammad Khan	INC	Meher Mohsin Haider
67	BJP	Deepak Kotekar	MNS	Kushal Dhuri	VBA	Pir Mohammad Sheikh
68	BJP	Rohan Rathod	MNS	Sandesh Desai	VBA	Paramjeet Singh
69	BJP	Sudha Singh	SS(UBT)	Yogesh Gore	INC	Prakash Yedge
70	BJP	Anish Makwani	SS(UBT)	Prasad Nagaokar	INC	Bhupendra Shingare
71	BJP	Sunita Mehta	SS(UBT)	Shraddha Prabhu	INC	Shraddha Ghadge
72	BJP	Mamata Yadav	SS(UBT)	Manisha Panchal	INC	Gayatri Gupta
73	SHS	Deepti Vaikar Potnis	SS(UBT)	Lona Rawat	VBA	Sneha Jadhav
74	BJP	Ujjwala Modak	MNS	Vidya Arya Kangane	INC	Samita Nitin Sawant
75	BJP	Umesh Rane	SS(UBT)	Pramod Sawant	INC	Imran Khalil Shaikh
76	BJP	Prakash Musale	SS(UBT)	Sneha Bhatkar	VBA	Prakash Kelaskar
77	SHS	Priyanka Ambolkar	SS(UBT)	Shivani Parab	INC	Monika Wadekar
78	SHS	Nazia Safi	NCP-SP	Radba Sheikh	INC	Siddiqui Shabana Bano
79	SHS	Sayali Parab	SS(UBT)	Mansi Madhukar	INC	Priyanka Mishra
80	BJP	Disha Yadav	SS(UBT)	Ekta Chaudhary	—	
81	BJP	Kesharben Patel	MNS	Shabnam Sheikh	INC	Kavita Raysaheb Saroj
82	BJP	Jagdeshwari Amin	SS(UBT)	Payal Naik	INC	Fatima Khan
83	SHS	Nidhi Sawant	SS(UBT)	Sonali Sabe	INC	Winnifred D'Souza
84	BJP	Anjali Samant	MNS	Rupali Dalvi	—	
85	BJP	Milind Shinde	MNS	Chetan Belkar	VBA	Ramswami Yadav
86	SHS	Ritesh Rai	SS(UBT)	Clive Dais	INC	Nitin Salagare
87	BJP	Krishna Mahesh Parkar	SS(UBT)	Pooja Mahadeshwar	INC	Pramod Narvekar
88	BJP	Pragya Samant	SS(UBT)	Sharvari Parab	VBA	Nidhi More
89	SHS	Rajesh Naik	SS(UBT)	Gitesh Raut	INC	Kamlesh Chaurasiya
90	BJP	Jyoti Upadhayay	SS(UBT)	Masood Ansari	INC	Tulip Miranda
91	SHS	Sagun Naik	SS(UBT)	Krishna Mahadgut	INC	Sheikh Mohammad Rafiq
92	SHS	Salim Qureshi	SS(UBT)	Arun Kamble	INC	Ibrahim Iqbal Qureshi
93	SHS	Sumit Vajale	SS(UBT)	Rohini Kamble	INC	Sharad Shejawal
94	SHS	Pallavi Sarmalkar	SS(UBT)	Pragya Bhutkar	INC	Supriya Pathak
95	BJP	Suhas Adiverkar	SS(UBT)	Hari Shastri	VBA	Ram Chandra Gupta
96	SHS	Tibha Sheikh	SS(UBT)	Sana Haleem Khan	INC	Shabana Zakir Shaikh
97	BJP	Hetal Gala	SS(UBT)	Mamata Chavan	INC	Gauri Chhabriya
98	BJP	Alka Kerkar	MNS	Dipti Kate	VBA	Sudarshan Yelve
99	BJP	Jitendra Raut	SS(UBT)	Chintamani Nivate	INC	Sunita Wavekar
100	BJP	Swapna Mhatre	SS(UBT)	Sadhana Varaskar	INC	Nida Tufail Shaikh
101	BJP	Anushree Ghodke	SS(UBT)	Akshata Menezes	INC	Karen Demello
102	BJP	Nilesh Handgar	MNS	Anant Hazare	INC	Raja Siraj Khan
103	BJP	Hetal Markvekar	MNS	Dipti Panchal	INC	Manisha Sonavane
104	BJP	Prakash Gangadhar	MNS	Rajesh Chavan	INC	Hemant Arun Bapat
105	BJP	Anita Vaiti	SS(UBT)	Archana Chaure	INC	Shubhangi Vaity
106	BJP	Prabhakar Shinde	MNS	Satyawan Dalvi	RSPS	Sanjay Balaram
107	BJP	Neil Somaiya	—		VBA	Vaishali Sakpal
108	BJP	Deepika Ghag	SS(UBT)	Shubhangi Keni	VBA	Ashwini Poche
109	SHS	Rajshree Mandvilkar	SS(UBT)	Suresh Shinde	INC	Ajay Patel
110	BJP	Jenny Sharma	MNS	Harinakshi Chirath	INC	Asha Suresh Koparkar
111	BJP	Sarika Pawar	SS(UBT)	Deepak Sawant	VBA	Ritesh Keni
112	BJP	Sakshi Dalvi	NCP-SP	Manju Jaiswal	INC	Shreya Shetty
113	SHS	Rupesh Patil	SS(UBT)	Deepmala Baban	VBA	Suryakant Amane
114	SHS	Supriya Dhurat	SS(UBT)	Rajul Patil	VBA	Seema Ingle
115	BJP	Smita Parab	MNS	Jyoti Rajbhoj	—	
116	BJP	Jagruti Patil	SS(UBT)	Shraddha Uttekar	INC	Sangeeta Tulaskar
117	SHS	Suvarna Karanje	SS(UBT)	Shweta Pawaskar	—	
118	SHS	Tejaswi Gade	SS(UBT)	Sunita Jadhav	VBA	Sunita Veer
119	SHS	Rajesh Sonawane	MNS	Vishwajeet Dholam	VBA	Chetan Ahire
120	SHS	Rajrajeshwari Redkar	SS(UBT)	Vishwas Shinde	INC	Khushbu Gupta
121	SHS	Pratima Khopde	SS(UBT)	Priyadarshini Thackeray	VBA	Deekshita Vighne
122	BJP	Chandan Sharma	SS(UBT)	Nilesh Salunkhe	VBA	Vishal Khandagale
123	BJP	Anil Nirmale	SS(UBT)	Sunil More	VBA	Baldhar Yadav
124	SHS	Jyoti Haroon Khan	SS(UBT)	Sakina Sheikh	VBA	Reeta Bhonsale
125	SHS	Suresh Awale	SS(UBT)	Satish Pawar	VBA	Sumedh Kasare
126	BJP	Archana Bhalerao	SS(UBT)	Shilpa Bhosale	INC	Nasir Khan
127	BJP	Alka Bhagat	SS(UBT)	Swaroopa Patil	VBA	Varsha Thorat
128	SHS	Ashwini Hande	MNS	Sai Shirke	—	
129	BJP	Ashwini Mate	MNS	Vijaya Gite	INC	Tripti Matele
130	BJP	Dharmesh Giri	SS(UBT)	Anand Kothavade	INC	Harish Karkera
131	BJP	Rakhi Jadhav	SS(UBT)	Vrushali Chavak	INC	Smita Khatu
132	BJP	Ritu Tawde	SS(UBT)	Kranti Mohite	—	
133	SHS	Shrutika Kande	MNS	Bhagyashree Jadhav	INC	Vaishali Phalke
134	SHS	Sameera Qureshi	SS(UBT)	Sakina Bano	INC	Benazir Irfan
135	BJP	Navnath Ban	SS(UBT)	Samiksha Sakre	INC	Vasant Kumbhar
136	SHS	Nizam Sheikh	SS(UBT)	Naresh Patil	INC	Alam Abdul Qayyum
137	SHS	Ayesha Sheikh	SS(UBT)	Mahadev Ambekar	INC	Nizamuddin Rayeen
138	SHS	Amol Ambekar	SS(UBT)	Arjun Shinde	INC	Sufiyan Niyaz
139	SHS	Zarina Qureshi	MNS	Shiromani Yeshu Jagli	VBA	Snehal Sohni
140	SHS	Sonali Jadhav	SS(UBT)	Siddharth Ustre	INC	Prajyoti Handore
140	SHS	Sonali Jadhav	NCP-SP	Sanjay Kamble	INC	Prajyoti Handore
141	BJP	Shritika More	SS(UBT)	Vitthal Lokre	—	
142	SHS	Apeksha Khandekar	SS(UBT)	Sunanda Lokre	INC	Bharti Dhaygude
143	SHS	Shobha Jaybhaye	MNS	Pranjal Rane	INC	Shaikh Farzana
144	BJP	Dinesh Bablu Panchal	SS(UBT)	Nimish Bhosale	INC	Sachin Mohite
145	SHS	Deepak Maheshwari	SS(UBT)	Arun Hule	INC	Sufiyan Abdul Mubeen
146	SHS	Samruddhi Kate	MNS	Rajesh Purabhe	VBA	Satish Rajguru
147	SHS	Pragya Sadafule	SS(UBT)	Jayshree Shinde	INC	Anupama Kedare
148	SHS	Anjali Naik	SS(UBT)	Pramod Shinde	INC	Rajendra Mahulkar
149	BJP	Susham Sawant	MNS	Avinash Mayekar	INC	Ganesh Awasthi
150	BJP	Vanita Kokare	MNS	Savita Thorve	INC	Vaishali Shedkar
151	BJP	Kashish Fulwaria	SS(UBT)	Sonia Thorat	INC	Sangeeta Bhalerao
152	BJP	Asha Marathe	MNS	Sudhanshu Dunbale	INC	Shashikant Bansode
153	SHS	Tanvi Kate	SS(UBT)	Meenakshi Patankar	—	
154	BJP	Mahadev Shigwan	SS(UBT)	Shekhar Chavan	INC	Murali Kumar Pillai
155	BJP	Varsha Shette	SS(UBT)	Snehal Shivkar	VBA	Jyoti Waghmare
156	SHS	Ashwini Matekar	SS(UBT)	Sanjana Santosh Kasle	INC	Savita Pawar
157	BJP	Asha Taide	SS(UBT)	Sarita Mhaske	VBA	Sonali Bansode
158	BJP	Akanksha Shette	SS(UBT)	Chitra Sangle	INC	Radhika Pawar
159	BJP	Prakash More	SS(UBT)	Prakash Shukla	INC	Pralhad Shetty
160	SHS	Kiran Landge	SS(UBT)	Rajendra Pakhare	VBA	Gautam Haral
161	SHS	Vijayendra Shinde	SS(UBT)	Irshad Sayyed	INC	Imran Hassan Khan
162	SHS	Wajid Qureshi	SS(UBT)	Annamalai S.	INC	Mohammad Aamir Arif
163	SHS	Shaila Lande	SS(UBT)	Sangeeta Sawant	INC	Sonu Jain
164	BJP	Harish Bhandirge	SS(UBT)	Sainath Sadhu Katke	VBA	Ashish Jadhav
165	BJP	Rupesh Pawar	NCP-SP	Abhijeet Kamble	INC	Mohammad Ashraf Azmi
166	SHS	Meenal Sanjay Turde	MNS	Rajan Khairnar	INC	Ghanshyam Bhapkar
167	— (Note: No candidate was put up by the Shiv Sena in Ward 167.)		SS(UBT)	Suvarna More	INC	Saman Arshad Azmi
168	BJP	Anuradha Pednekar	SS(UBT)	Sudhir Khatu	INC	Wasim Siddique
169	SHS	Jay Kudalakar	SS(UBT)	Pravina Morajkar	VBA	Swapnil Javalgekar
170	BJP	Ranjita Divekar	NCP-SP	Ruhi Khanolkar	INC	Reshma Tabrez Momin
171	SHS	Sanvi Tandel	SS(UBT)	Rani Yerunkar	INC	Santosh Jadhav
172	BJP	Rajshree Shirodkar	SS(UBT)	Madhuri Bhise	—	
173	SHS	Pooja Kamble	SS(UBT)	Pranitha Waghdhare	VBA	Sugandha Sonde
174	BJP	Sakshi Kanojia	SS(UBT)	Padmavati Shinde	INC	Ishwari Velu
175	SHS	Mansi Satamkar	MNS	Archana Kasale	INC	Lalita Yadav
175	SHS	Mansi Satamkar	NCP-SP	Arti Devendra	INC	Lalita Yadav
176	BJP	Rekha Yadav	SS(UBT)	Harshada Patil	INC	Anita Patole
177	BJP	Kalpesha Kothari	MNS	Hemali Bhansali	VBA	Kumud Warekar
178	SHS	Amey Ghole	MNS	Bajrang Deshmukh	INC	Raghunath Thawai
179	SHS	Shama Sardar	SS(UBT)	Deepali Khedekar	INC	Ayesha Bano
179	SHS	Shama Sardar	NCP-SP	Bharati Pandey	INC	Ayesha Bano
180	SHS	Trushna Vishwasrao	SS(UBT)	Asmita Gaonkar	INC	Smita Mhatre
181	SHS	Pushpa Koli	SS(UBT)	Anil Kadam	INC	Kamlesh Pappu Yadav
182	BJP	Rajan Parkar	SS(UBT)	Milind Vaidya	—	
183	SHS	Vaishali Shewale	MNS	Parubhai Katke	INC	Asha Deepak Kale
184	SHS	Komal Jain	SS(UBT)	Varsha Nakashe	INC	Sajida Babbu Khan
185	BJP	Ravi Raja	SS(UBT)	T. M. Jagadish	INC	Chitroda Lalji
186	BJP	Neela Sonavane	SS(UBT)	Archana Shinde	INC	Saddichha Shinde
187	SHS	Vakil Sheikh	SS(UBT)	Joseph Koli	INC	Ayesha Aslam Khan
188	SHS	Bhaskar Shetty	MNS	Arif Shaikh	INC	Mariammal Muturamlingam
189	BJP	Mangala Gaikwad	SS(UBT)	Harshala More	INC	Vaishali Waghmare
190	BJP	Sheetal Gambhir Desai	SS(UBT)	Vaishali Patil	INC	Dayashankar Yadav
191	SHS	Priya Sarvankar	SS(UBT)	Vishakha Raut	—	
192	SHS	Preeti Patankar	MNS	Yashwant Killedar	INC	Deepak Waghmare
193	SHS	Pralhad Varlikar	SS(UBT)	Hemangi Varlikar	VBA	Bhushan Nagvekar
194	SHS	Samadhan Sarvankar	SS(UBT)	Nishikant Shinde	VBA	Ashok Gujetti
195	BJP	Rajesh Kangane	SS(UBT)	Vijay Bhange	VBA	Mohan Pawar
196	BJP	Sonali Sawant	SS(UBT)	Padmaja Chemburkar	VBA	Rachana Khute
197	SHS	Vanita Narvankar	MNS	Rachana Salvi	VBA	Asmita Dolas
198	SHS	Vandana Gawli	SS(UBT)	Aboli Khade	—	
199	SHS	Rupali Kasule	SS(UBT)	Kishori Pednekar	VBA	Nandini Jadhav
200	BJP	Sandeep Pansande	SS(UBT)	Urmila Panchal	INC	Suresh Kale
201	SHS	Supriya More	SS(UBT)	Rekha Kamble	INC	Pallavi Mungekar
202	BJP	Parth Bavkar	SS(UBT)	Shraddha Jadhav	VBA	Pramod Jadhav
203	SHS	Samidha Bhalekar	SS(UBT)	Shraddha Pednekar	—	
204	SHS	Anil Kokil	SS(UBT)	Kiran Tawde	INC	Narendra Awadooth
205	BJP	Varsha Shinde	MNS	Supriya Dalvi	INC	Apurva Salistekar
206	SHS	Sanjay Nana Ambole	SS(UBT)	Sachin Padwal	INC	Sunil Yadav
207	BJP	Rohidas Lokhande	MNS	Shalaka Aryan	VBA	Chandrashekhar Kande
208	SHS	Vijay Lipare	SS(UBT)	Ramakant Rahate	INC	Satish Khandge
209	SHS	Yamini Jadhav	MNS	Hasina Mahimkar	INC	Abdul Rasheed Damudi
210	BJP	Santosh Rane	SS(UBT)	Sonam Jamsutkar	INC	Anil Tukaram Vaje
211	— (Note: BJP candidate Shakeel Ansari's nomination was rejected from Ward 211.) (Note: BJP candidate Mandakini Khamkar's nomination was rejected from Ward 212.)		—		INC	Waqar Nisar Ahmed
212	—		MNS	Shravani Haldankar	INC	Nazia Ashfaque Siddiqui
213	SHS	Aasha Mamidi	SS(UBT)	Shraddha Surve	INC	Nasima Zayed
214	BJP	Ajay Patil	MNS	Mukesh Bhalerao	INC	Mahesh Gawale
215	BJP	Santosh Dhole	SS(UBT)	Kiran Balsaraf	INC	Bhavna Koli
216	BJP	Gauri Narvankar	MNS	Rajshree Nagre	INC	Rajashree Bhatankar
217	BJP	Gaurang Jhaveri	MNS	Nilesh Shirdhankar	INC	Ravikant Baykar
218	BJP	Snehal Tendulkar	SS(UBT)	Geeta Ahirekar	INC	Rekha Thakur
219	BJP	Sunny Sanap	SS(UBT)	Rajendra Gaikwad	INC	Anuradha Kashelkar
220	BJP	Dipali Kulathe	SS(UBT)	Sampada Mayekar	INC	Sonal Parmar
221	BJP	Akash Purohit	SS(UBT)	Abhijeet Gurav	INC	Prithviraj Jain
222	BJP	Rita Makwana	SS(UBT)	Sampat Thakur	INC	Vijay Prabhulkar
223	SHS	Priya Patil	MNS	Prashant Gandhi	INC	Dyanraj Nikam
224	SHS	Ruchi Wadkar	NCP-SP	Sania Kashif Shah	INC	Rukhsana Noorul Amin
225	BJP	Harshita Narwekar	SS(UBT)	Ajinkya Dhatrak	VBA	Vishal Jaunjal
225	SHS	Sujata Sanap	SS(UBT)	Ajinkya Dhatrak	VBA	Vishal Jaunjal
226	BJP	Makarand Narwekar	—		—	
227	BJP	Dr. Gauravi Narwekar	SS(UBT)	Rehana Ghafoor Sheikh	—	

== Exit polls ==
Polling agency					Lead
Polling agency	BJP+	SS(UBT)+	INC+	Others	Lead
Axis My India	141	63	14	9	BJP+
JVC Poll	138	59	23	7	BJP+
JDS	127–154	44–64	16–25	10–21	BJP+
Janmat Polls	138	62	20	7	BJP+
DV Research	107–122	68–83	18–25	10–19	BJP+
Poll of polls	132	63	20	11	BJP+
Actual result	118	72	24	13	BJP+

== Result ==
=== Results by alliance or party ===
Source
Alliance/ Party		Popular vote			Seats			SR
Alliance/ Party		Votes	%	±pp	Contested	Won	+/−	%
BJP + SHS	BJP	1,540,781	28.13		135 (Note: BJP and SHS will have a friendly fight in Ward 225.)	89	▲7	65.93
BJP + SHS	SHS	698,253	12.75		89 (Note: BJP and SHS will have a friendly fight in Ward 225.)	29	New entry	32.58
BJP + SHS	Total	2,239,034	40.88		224 (Note: Nomination of BJP candidates from Wards 211 & 212 were cancelled.) (Note: SHS did not put up a candidate in Ward 167.)	118		52.68
SS(UBT) + MNS + NCP(SP)	SS(UBT)	1,323,279	24.16		160 (Note: SS(UBT) and NCP(SP) will have friendly fight in Ward 140 and Ward 179.)	65	New entry	40.63
SS(UBT) + MNS + NCP(SP)	MNS	332,960	6.08		53 (Note: MNS and NCP(SP) will have friendly fight in Ward 175.)	6	▼1	11.32
SS(UBT) + MNS + NCP(SP)	NCP-SP	30,573	0.56		11	1	New entry	9.09
SS(UBT) + MNS + NCP(SP)	Total	1,686,812	30.80		224 (Note: The alliance has no candidate in 3 wards.)	72		32.14
INC + VBA + RSPS	INC	242,646	9.31		151	24	▼7	15.89
INC + VBA + RSPS	VBA				46	0	Steady	
INC + VBA + RSPS	RSPS				2	0	Steady	
INC + VBA + RSPS	Total				199 (Note: The alliance does not have any candidate in 28 wards.)	24		12.06
CPI(M)					9	0	Steady	
NCP		24,691	0.95		37	3	New entry	8.11
SP		15,162	0.58		30	2	▼4	6.67
AIMIM		68,072	2.61			8	▲6	
ABS						0	▼1	
Others						13		
NOTA								
Total			100%	—		227	—	—

=== Results by ward ===
Area	Ward Details		Winner			Runner Up			Margin
Area	No.	Area	Candidate	Party	Votes	Candidate	Party	Votes	Margin
R–North	1	Kandarpada - IC Colony	Rekha Yadav	SHS	7,544	Sheetal Mhatre	INC	5,070	2,474
R–North	2	Gaondevi - Dahisar (East)	Tejaswi Ghosalkar	BJP	16,484	Dhanashree Kolge	SS(UBT)	5,729	10,755
R–North	3	Ketkipada - Shailendra Nagar	Prakash Darekar	BJP	12,325	Roshni Gaikwad	SS(UBT)	8,340	3,985
R–North	4	Ravalpad	Mangesh Pangare	SHS	14,667	Raju Mulla	SS(UBT)	10,779	3,888
R–North	5	Ashokvan - Chintamani Nagar	Sanjay Ghadi	SHS	15,348	Sujata Patekar	SS(UBT)	10,420	4,928
R–North	6	Ambadi - Overi Pada	Diksha Karkar	SHS	18,235	Sanjana Vengurlekar	SS(UBT)	5,777	12,458
R–North	7	Kandarpada	Ganesh Khankar	BJP	10,148	Saurabh Ghosalkar	SS(UBT)	9,351	797
R–North	8	Mandapeshwar	Yogita Patil	BJP	12,168	Ratnaprabha Junnarkar	INC	3,733	8,435
R–Central	9	MHB Colony	Shivanand Shetty	BJP	18,423	Sanjay Bhosale	SS(UBT)	8,525	9,898
R–Central	10	Govind Nagar	Jitendra Patel	BJP	20,126	Vijay Patil	MNS	7,877	12,249
R–Central	11	Daulat Nagar	Aditi Khursange	SHS	14,513	Kavita Mane	MNS	11,850	2,663
R–Central	12	National Park	Sarika Zore	SS(UBT)	11,232	Suvarna Gavas	SHS	8,348	2,884
R–Central	13	Alta Colony - Dattapada	Rani Dwivedi	BJP	16,360	Asawari Patil	SS(UBT)	5,958	10,402
R–Central	14	Rajendra Nagar, Borivali	Seema Shinde	BJP	14,241	Pooja Mainkar	MNS	9,192	5,049
R–Central	15	Kora Centre	Jignasa Shah	BJP	26,088	Jayshree Bangera	SS(UBT)	4,554	21,534
R–Central	16	Vazhira Naka	Shweta Korgaonkar	BJP	15,753	Swati Borkar	SS(UBT)	12,659	3,094
R–Central	17	Kastur Park	Shilpa Sangore	BJP	20,390	Ashwini Sarfare	SS(UBT)	6,063	14,327
R–Central	18	Charkop (S), Kandivali	Sandhya Doshi	SHS	15,569	Sadiccha More	MNS	12,126	3,443
R–South	19	Charkop Sector	Dakshata Kavthankar	BJP	13,466	Leena Gudhekar	SS(UBT)	12,590	876
R–South	20	Sahyadri Nagar	Dipak Tawde	BJP	10,268	Dinesh Salvi	MNS	7,530	2,738
R–South	21	Mahavir Nagar	Leena Deherkar	BJP	20,267	Sonali Mishra	MNS	7,003	13,264
R–South	22	Sundar Pada	Himanshu Parekh	BJP	16,919	Ashish Patil	SS(UBT)	7,188	9,731
R–South	23	Parsi Colony	Shiv Kumar Jha	BJP	7,090	Kiran Jadhav	MNS	5,810	1,280
R–South	24	Defence Colony	Swati Jaiswal	BJP	11,371	Mukta Patel	SS(UBT)	5,372	5,999
R–South	25	Thakur Village	Nisha Parulekar	BJP	12,518	Yogesh Bhoir	SS(UBT)	7,429	5,089
R–South	26	Gautam Nagar, Damu Nagar	Dharmendra Kale	SS(UBT)	6,459	Pritam Pandagale	BJP	5,501	958
R–South	27	Narsi Pada	Neelam Gurav	BJP	10,028	Asha Chandar	MNS	5,110	4,918
R–South	28	Hanuman Nagar	Ajanta Yadav	INC	10,579	Vrushali Hundare	SHS	5,849	4,730
R–South	29	Ashok Nagar	Sachin Patil	SS(UBT)	14,038	Nitin Chauhan	BJP	12,125	1,913
R–South	30	Irani Wadi	Dhaval Vora	BJP	23,346	Diwakar Patil	SS(UBT)	2,499	20,847
R–South	31	Ekta Nagar	Manisha Yadav	BJP	10,501	Bhagyalakshmi Rajpurohit	INC	10,223	278
P–North	32	Malwani and Jankalyan Nagar	Geeta Bhandari	SS(UBT)	8,677	Manali Bhandari	SHS	8,593	84
P–North	33	Azad Nagar	Mohd. Moin Siddiqui	INC	12,644	Ujjwala Vaity	BJP	6,318	6,326
P–North	34	BMC Colony	Haider Ali Sheikh	INC	16,622	John Dennis	BJP	4,229	12,393
P–North	35	Dominic Colony	Yogesh Verma	BJP	16,862	Dipak More	SS(UBT)	6,808	10,054
P–North	36	Pushpa Park	Siddharth Sharma	BJP	13,203	Prashant Mahadik	MNS	7,348	5,855
P–North	37	Kurar Village	Yogita Kadam	SS(UBT)	10,981	Pratibha Shinde	BJP	9,072	1,909
P–North	38	Tanaji Nagar	Surekha Parab	MNS	11,226	Rishita Chache	SHS	7,953	3,273
P–North	39	Gokul Nagar	Pushpa Kalambe	SS(UBT)	6,411	Madhu Singh	INC	5,228	1,183
P–North	40	Mira Nagar, Dindoshi	Tulshiram Shinde	SS(UBT)	9,263	Sanjay Awhad	BJP	6,523	2,740
P–North	41	Nagri Nivara, Santosh Nagar	Suhas Wadkar	SS(UBT)	7,196	Manasi Patil	SHS	6,600	596
P–North	42	Pimpri Pada	Dhanashree Bharadkar	SHS	8,541	Pranita Nikam	SS(UBT)	7,519	1,022
P–North	43	Kokni Pada	Ajit Raorane	NCP-SP	11,760	Vinod Mishra	BJP	11,265	495
P–North	44	Raheja Township	Sangeeta Sharma	BJP	13,242	Sayali Sakpal	SS(UBT)	8,500	4,742
P–North	45	Govind Nagar	Sanjay Kamble	BJP	18,884	Nirav Barot	SS(UBT)	6,081	12,803
P–North	46	Mamaleddar Wadi	Yogita Koli	BJP	19,766	Snehita Dehalikar	MNS	8,919	10,847
P–North	47	Mamaleddar Wadi	Tejinder Singh Tiwana	BJP	13,558	Ganesh Gurav	SS(UBT)	5,923	7,635
P–North	48	Malni Depot	Rafiq Sheikh	INC	13,154	Salma Almelkar	SHS	3,625	9,529
P–North	49	Madh Bet	Sangeeta Koli	INC	10,733	Sangeeta Sutar	SS(UBT)	8,908	1,825
P–South	50	Bangurnagar, Sundar Nagar	Vikram Rajput	BJP	13,763	Tanvi Rao	SS(UBT)	9,400	4,363
P–South	51	Jayprakash Nagar	Varsha Tembawalkar	SHS	11,567	Aarti Chavan	NCP-SP	6,376	5,191
P–South	52	Gokuldam	Priti Satam	BJP	9,917	Supriya Gadhave	SS(UBT)	8,953	964
P–South	53	Arey Colony	Jitendra Valvi	SS(UBT)	8,776	Ashok Khandave	SHS	6,558	2,218
P–South	54	Pandurang Wadi	Ankit Prabhu	SS(UBT)	11,197	Viplav Aksare	BJP	9,022	2,175
P–South	55	Jawahar Nagar	Harsh Patel	BJP	18,728	Shailendra More	MNS	5,007	13,721
P–South	56	Motilal Nagar	Laxmi Bhatia	SS(UBT)	11,455	Rajul Desai	BJP	10,718	737
P–South	57	Lakshmi Nagar	Shrikala Pillay	BJP	10,194	Gaurav Rane	INC	6,516	3,678
P–South	58	Oshivara Depot	Sandeep Patel	BJP	10,406	Virendra Jadhav	MNS	8,155	2,251
K–West	59	Versova	Yashodhar Phanse	SS(UBT)	6,610	Yogiraj Dabhadkar	BJP	6,237	373
K–West	60	Lokhandwala	Sayali Kulkarni	BJP	11,016	Meghana Mane	SS(UBT)	6,895	4,121
K–West	61	Anand Nagar	Divya Singh	INC	8,890	Rajul Patel	SHS	6,885	2,005
K–West	62	Behram Baag	Zeeshan Multani	SS(UBT)	10,154	Raju Pednekar	SHS	6,333	3,821
K–West	63	MHADA Colony	Rupesh Savarkar	BJP	9,193	Devendra Amberkar	SS(UBT)	8,655	538
K–West	64	Shivalik Nagar	Saba Khan	SS(UBT)	10,174	Sarita Rajpure	BJP	6,406	3,768
K–West	65	Rambag, Amboli	Vitthal Banderi	BJP	8,328	Prasad Ayare	SS(UBT)	7,245	1,083
K–West	66	Lohana Colony	Meher Haider	INC	14,254	Aarti Pandya	BJP	7,543	6,711
K–West	67	Char Bangla	Deepak Kotekar	BJP	14,322	Kushal Dhuri	MNS	4,931	9,391
K–West	68	Saat Bangla	Rohan Rathod	BJP	12,992	Sandesh Desai	MNS	6,368	6,624
K–West	69	Juhu Tara	Sudha Singh	BJP	10,492	Yogesh Gore	SS(UBT)	6,432	4,060
K–West	70	Azad Nagar, Mithibai	Anish Makwani	BJP	14,745	Prasad Nagaonkar	SS(UBT)	4,260	10,485
K–West	71	Juhu Koliwada	Sunita Mehta	BJP	9,825	Shraddha Prabhu	SS(UBT)	5,515	4,310
K–East	72	Natwar Nagar	Mamata Yadav	BJP	14,588	Manisha Panchal	SS(UBT)	12,982	1,606
K–East	73	Shamnagar	Lona Rawat	SS(UBT)	13,424	Dipti Waikar	SHS	10,293	3,131
K–East	74	Ganesh Nagar	Vidya Kangane	MNS	8,036	Ujjwala Modak	BJP	7,955	81
K–East	75	Marol Depot	Pramod Sawant	SS(UBT)	12,131	Umesh Rane	BJP	8,609	3,522
K–East	76	Subhash Nagar	Prakash Musale	BJP	12,036	Sneha Bhatkar	SS(UBT)	7,084	4,952
K–East	77	Meghwadi	Shivani Parab	SS(UBT)	15,431	Priyanka Ambolkar	SHS	6,658	8,773
K–East	78	Shivaji Nagar	Sophie Jabbar	SHS	5,826	Gausiya Shaikh	JPP (Note: Jan Parivartan Party)	4,710	1,116
K–East	79	Shankar Wadi	Mansi Juvatkar	SS(UBT)	12,104	Sayali Parab	SHS	9,519	2,585
K–East	80	Parsi Colony	Disha Yadav	BJP	13,683	Ekta Chaudhari	SS(UBT)	9,424	4,259
K–East	81	Sher-E-PunjSherh	Kesharben Patel	BJP	13,224	Mohini Dhamane	SS(UBT)	7,841	5,383
K–East	82	Ashoker Nagar	Jagdishwari Amin	BJP	9,260	Payal Naik	SS(UBT)	5,607	3,653
K–East	83	Brahmin Pada	Sonali Sabe	SS(UBT)	6,691	Nidhi Sawant	SHS	5,654	1,037
K–East	84	Koldongri	Anjali Samant	BJP	17,692	Rupali Dalvi	MNS	13,764	3,928
K–East	85	Dahankar College	Milind Shinde	BJP	19,390	Chetan Belkar	MNS	7,853	11,537
K–East	86	Sahara Village	Ritesh Rai	SHS	8,248	Clive Dias	SS(UBT)	6,284	1,964
H–East	87	Hanuman Tekdi	Puja Mahadeshwar	SS(UBT)	11,588	Krishna Parkar	BJP	9,160	2,428
H–East	88	Wakola	Sharvari Parab	SS(UBT)	10,675	Pradnya Samant	BJP	7,134	3,541
H–East	89	Dhobi Ghat	Gitesh Raut	SS(UBT)	11,257	Rajesh Naik	SHS	9,003	2,254
H–East	90	Kalina	Tulip Miranda	INC	5,197	Jyoti Upadhyay	BJP	5,190	7
H–East	91	Vidya Nagar	Sagun Naik	SHS	8,830	Krishna Mhadgut	SS(UBT)	7,140	1,690
H–East	92	Bharat Nagar	Ibrahim Qureshi	INC	8,586	Haji Salim Qureshi	SHS	4,274	4,312
H–East	93	MIG Colony	Rohini Kamble	SS(UBT)	10,268	Sumit Vajale	SHS	6,050	4,218
H–East	94	Golibar	Pragya Bhutkar	SS(UBT)	10,337	Pallavi Pai	SHS	7,977	2,360
H–East	95	Kherwadi	Hari Shastri	SS(UBT)	10,563	Suhas Adiwarekar	BJP	6,644	3,919
H–East	96	Vandre Terminus	Ayesha Khan	NCP	7,162	Shabana Zakir	INC	4,440	2,722
H–West	97	Santacruz Bus Depot	Hetal Gala	BJP	13,398	Mamata Chavan	SS(UBT)	6,493	6,905
H–West	98	Khar West	Alka Kerkar	BJP	14,866	Dipti Kate	MNS	3,094	11,772
H–West	99	Khar Danda + Gazdar Bandh	Chintamani Nivate	SS(UBT)	11,538	Jitendra Raut	BJP	11,219	319
H–West	100	Pali Village + Old Khar	Swapna Mhatre	BJP	10,910	Nida Shaikh	INC	6,331	4,579
H–West	101	Bandra Talao and Bandstand	Karen D'Mello	INC	9,424	Anushree Ghodke	BJP	8,620	804
H–West	102	Bandra Reclamation	Rehbar Siraj Khan	INC	14,770	Nilesh Handgar	BJP	3,814	10,956
T	103	Tulsi Lake	Hetal Morvekar	BJP	17,334	Dipti Panchal	MNS	5,205	12,109
T	104	Siddarth Nagar	Prakash Gangadhare	BJP	15,569	Rajesh Chavan	MNS	7,238	8,331
T	105	Gavhanpada	Anita Vaiti	BJP	14,742	Archana Chavare	SS(UBT)	9,762	4,980
T	106	Hariom Nagar	Prabhakar Shinde	BJP	11,897	Satyavan Dalvi	MNS	11,733	164
T	107	Mulund	Neil Somaiya	BJP	21,229	Dinesh Jadhav	IND	6,224	15,005
T	108	Hanumanpada	Deepika Ghag	BJP	16,300	Shubhangi Keni	SS(UBT)	10,205	6,095
S	109	Tanaji Wadi	Suresh Shinde	SS(UBT)	10,520	Rajshri Mandvilkar	SHS	4,685	5,835
S	110	Bhandup Sonapur	Asha Koparkar	INC	9,179	Jenny Sharma	BJP	8,322	857
S	111	Datar Colony	Deepak Sawant	SS(UBT)	12,206	Sarika Pawar	BJP	7,352	4,854
S	112	Punjabi Colony	Sakshi Dalvi	BJP	14,045	Manju Jaiswal	NCP-SP	5,793	8,252
S	113	Milind Nagar	Deepmala Badhe	SS(UBT)	10,310	Rupesh Patil	SHS	8,319	1,991
S	114	Kranti Nagar	Rajul Patil	SS(UBT)	11,819	Anisha Mazgaonkar	IND	8,055	3,764
S	115	Kokannagar	Jyoti Rajbhoj	MNS	12,452	Smita Parab	BJP	9,172	3,280
S	116	New Colony	Jagruti Patil	BJP	11,038	Shraddha Utekar	SS(UBT)	7,781	3,257
S	117	Kanjur Village	Shweta Pawaskar	SS(UBT)	13,440	Suvarna Karanje	SHS	11,117	2,323
S	118	Kannamwar Nagar	Sunita Jadhav	SS(UBT)	16,199	Tejasvi Gade	SHS	8,787	7,412
S	119	Tagore Nagar	Rajesh Sonawane	SHS	8,121	Vishwajit Dholam	MNS	6,954	1,167
S	120	Godrej Colony	Vishwas Shinde	SS(UBT)	10,378	Rajarajeshwari Redkar	SHS	6,242	4,136
S	121	IIT Powai	Priyadarshini Thackeray	SS(UBT)	5,547	Pratima Khopade	SHS	5,533	14
S	122	Hiranandani Garden	Chandan Sharma	BJP	11,320	Nilesh Salunkhe	SS(UBT)	5,554	5,766
N	123	Vikroli Park Site	Sunil More	SS(UBT)	11,330	Anil Nirmale	BJP	7,358	3,978
N	124	Varsha Nagar	Sakina Shaikh	SS(UBT)	12,496	Jyoti Khan	SHS	7,439	5,057
N	125	Ramabai Colony	Suresh Awale	SHS	11,132	Satish Pawar	SS(UBT)	10,563	569
N	126	Jagdusha Nagar	Archana Bhalerao	BJP	11,134	Shilpa Bhosale	SS(UBT)	10,263	871
N	127	Ramnagar	Swaroopa Patil	SS(UBT)	15,478	Alka Bhagat	BJP	7,824	7,654
N	128	Burvenagar	Saee Shirke	MNS	12,831	Ashwini Hande	SHS	12,673	158
N	129	Chiraagnagar	Ashwini Mate	BJP	9,815	Vijaya Geete	MNS	6,793	3,022
N	130	Kirol Village	Dharmesh Giri	BJP	14,253	Anand Kothavade	SS(UBT)	7,474	6,779
N	131	Naidu Colony	Rakhi Jadhav	BJP	21,346	Vrushali Chavak	SS(UBT)	9,506	11,840
N	132	Somaiya College, Garodia Nagar	Ritu Tawde	BJP	19,810	Kranti Mohite	SS(UBT)	3,645	16,165
N	133	Kamraj Nagar	Nirmiti Kanade	SHS	12,295	Supriya Jadhav	VBA	8,656	3,639
M–East	134	Kamala Nagar	Mehjabin Khan	AIMIM	8,414	Benazir Diwate	INC	6,198	2,216
M–East	135	Ramabainagar	Navnath Ban	BJP	5,578	Irshad Khan	AIMIM	3,520	2,058
M–East	136	Shivajinagar Terminus	Jameer Qureshi	AIMIM	14,921	Ruksana Siddiqui	SP	4,978	9,943
M–East	137	Shivajinagar	Shameer Patel	AIMIM	9,436	Ayesha Rafiq	SHS	4,868	4,568
M–East	138	Metro Hospital	Roshan Shaikh	AIMIM	7,499	Mehfuz Shaikh	SP	5,525	1,974
M–East	139	Lotus Colony	Shabana Shaikh	AIMIM	9,940	Zarina Qureshi	SHS	4,158	5,782
M–East	140	Tata Nagar	Vijay Ubale	AIMIM	4,945	Sonali Jadhav	SHS	3,422	1,523
M–East	141	Municipal Colony	Vitthal Lokare	SS(UBT)	8,483	Shrutika More	BJP	5,061	3,422
M–East	142	Lalubhai Compound	Apeksha Khandekar	SHS	5,438	Sunanda Dherange	IND	4,362	1,076
M–East	143	Maharashtra Nagar	Shabana Qazi	AIMIM	5,264	Shobha Jaybhaye	SHS	4,321	943
M–East	144	Devnar Village	Dinesh Panchal	BJP	8,844	Nimish Bhosale	SS(UBT)	7,175	1,669
M–East	145	Chitta Camp	Khairunnisa Hussain	AIMIM	7,653	Deepak Phalod	IND	5,558	2,095
M–East	146	Anushakti Colony	Samruddhi Kate	SHS	9,777	Satish Rajguru	VBA	4,742	5,035
M–East	147	RCF Colony	Pragya Sadaphule	SHS	5,144	Jayshri Shinde	SS(UBT)	4,508	636
M–East	148	HP Nagar	Anjali Naik	SHS	5,004	Pramod Shinde	SS(UBT)	3,913	1,091
M–West	149	Chedanagar	Susham Sawant	BJP	13,174	Avinash Mayekar	MNS	5,302	7,872
M–West	150	BMC Colony	Vaishali Shendkar	INC	8,859	Savita Thorve	MNS	3,281	5,578
M–West	151	Thakkarappa Colony	Kashish Fulwaria	BJP	13,606	Vandana Sable	NCP	7,304	6,302
M–West	152	Postal Colony	Asha Marathe	BJP	12,491	Sudhanshu Dunabale	MNS	6,881	5,610
M–West	153	Chhatrapati Sambhajinagar	Meenakshi Patankar	SS(UBT)	16,069	Tanvi Kate	SHS	9,618	6,451
M–West	154	Chembur Colony	Mahadev Shivgan	BJP	11,349	Shekhar Chavan	SS(UBT)	9,885	1,464
M–West	155	Mahul Village	Snehal Shivkar	SS(UBT)	10,955	Jyoti Waghmare	VBA	9,165	1,790
L	156	Tunga Village	Ashwini Matekar	SHS	13,533	Savita Pawar	INC	8,536	4,997
L	157	Raheja Vihar	Sarita Mhaske	SS(UBT)	14,749	Asha Tayade	BJP	12,946	1,803
L	158	Yadav Nagar	Chitra Sangale	SS(UBT)	13,286	Akanksha Shetye	BJP	8,385	4,901
L	159	Asalfa, Mohili	Prakash More	BJP	6,521	Pralhad Shetty	INC	6,245	276
L	160	Narayan Nagar	Kiran Landge	SHS	11,316	Rajendra Pakhare	SS(UBT)	7,760	3,556
L	161	Netaji Nagar	Vijayendra Shinde	SHS	7,715	Imran Khan	INC	5,015	2,700
L	162	Disoja Nagar	Amir Khan	INC	11,307	Wajid Qureshi	SHS	7,906	3,401
L	163	Sakinaka	Shaila Lande	SHS	10,007	Sonu Jain	INC	6,949	3,058
L	164	Kamani, Navpada	Harish Bhandirge	BJP	9,803	Sainath Katke	SS(UBT)	7,601	2,202
L	165	Christian Village	Ashraf Azmi	INC	7,782	Rupesh Pawar	BJP	7,227	555
L	166	Kismat Nagar	Meenal Turde	SHS	6,435	Rajan Khairnar	MNS	4,480	1,955
L	167	Buddha Colony	Saman Azmi	INC	11,551	Tabassum Rashid	SP	7,670	3,881
L	168	Kalpana Nagar	Saeeda Khan	NCP	8,277	Sudhir Khatu	SS(UBT)	7,508	769
L	169	Nehru Nagar	Pravina Morajkar	SS(UBT)	8,021	Jay Kudalkar	SHS	7,051	970
L	170	Avhrad Nagar	Bushra Malik	NCP	9,252	Anjali Divekar	BJP	3,455	5,797
L	171	Samarth Nagar	Rani Yerunkar	SS(UBT)	9,927	Saanvi Tandel	SHS	6,882	3,045
F–North	172	Sion Fort	Rajashree Shirwadkar	BJP	15,698	Madhuri Bhise	SS(UBT)	5,754	9,944
F–North	173	Somyya Hospital	Shilpa Keluskar	BJP	9,310	Pranita Waghdhare	SS(UBT)	7,628	1,682
F–North	174	Wadal, RTO	Sakshi Kanojia	BJP	5,523	Padmavati Shinde	SS(UBT)	3,078	2,445
F–North	175	Kokri Agar	Manasi Satamkar	SHS	6,895	Lalita Yadav	INC	6,646	249
F–North	176	GTB Nagar	Rekha Yadav	BJP	7,138	Harshada Patil	SS(UBT)	6,195	943
F–North	177	Punjabi Camp	Kalpesha Kothari	BJP	12,179	Nehal Shah	IND	2,971	9,208
F–North	178	Parsi Colony	Amey Ghole	SHS	15,911	Bajrang Deshmukh	MNS	4,542	11,369
F–North	179	Nadkarni Park	Ayesha Bano	INC	6,934	Dipali Khedekar	SS(UBT)	6,431	503
F–North	180	Dosti Arcade	Trushna Vishwasrao	SHS	8,094	Smita Gaonkar	SS(UBT)	6,421	1,673
F–North	181	Korba Mithagar	Anil Kadam	SS(UBT)	5,928	Pushpa Koli	SHS	5,089	839
G–North	182	Mahim Koliwada	Milind Vaidya	SS(UBT)	14,248	Rajan Parkar	BJP	4,394	9,854
G–North	183	Dharavi Agar	Asha Kale	INC	6,441	Vaishali Shewale	SHS	5,187	1,254
G–North	184	Lakshmi Baag	Sajida Khan	INC	8,246	Varsha Nakashe	SS(UBT)	6,071	2,175
G–North	185	Rajiv Gandhi Nagar	T. M. Jagadish	SS(UBT)	8,860	Ravi Raja	BJP	6,388	2,472
G–North	186	Dharavi Village	Archana Shinde	SS(UBT)	6,731	Neela Sonawane	BJP	5,690	1,041
G–North	187	Navrang Compound	Joseph Koli	SS(UBT)	7,067	Shaikh Vakeel	SHS	5,753	1,314
G–North	188	RP Nagar	Bhaskar Shetty	SHS	6,513	Munawwar Ali	AIMIM	6,035	478
G–North	189	Labour Camp	Harshala More	SS(UBT)	8,081	Mangala Gaikwad	BJP	3,602	4,479
G–North	190	Navjivan Colony	Sheetal Gambhir	BJP	11,468	Vaishali Patankar	SS(UBT)	11,347	121
G–North	191	Shivaji Park	Vishakha Raut	SS(UBT)	13,236	Priya Sarvankar	SHS	13,039	197
G–North	192	Dadar (West)	Yashwant Killedar	MNS	14,253	Priti Patankar	SHS	12,822	1,431
G–South	193	Worli Village	Hemangi Worlikar	SS(UBT)	12,768	Prahlad Worlikar	SHS	9,837	2,931
G–South	194	Prabhadevi	Nishikant Shinde	SS(UBT)	15,592	Samadhan Sarvankar	SHS	14,989	603
G–South	195	Lower Parel (West)	Vijay Bhanage	SS(UBT)	15,562	Rajesh Kangane	BJP	10,007	5,555
G–South	196	Worli Dairy	Padmaja Chemburkar	SS(UBT)	13,169	Sonali Sawant	BJP	6,834	6,335
G–South	197	Mahalakshmi Racecourse	Vanita Narvankar	SHS	7,153	Farheen Khan	NCP	3,815	3,338
G–South	198	Mafatlal Mill	Aboli Khadye	SS(UBT)	15,678	Vandana Gawli	SHS	9,400	6,278
G–South	199	Arthur Road Jail	Kishori Pednekar	SS(UBT)	12,786	Rupal Kusale	SHS	11,097	1,689
F–South	200	Nayigav	Urmila Panchal	SS(UBT)	12,232	Sandeep Pansande	BJP	9,014	3,218
F–South	201	Spring Mill Compound	Eram Siddiqui	SP	6,314	Supriya More	SHS	5,564	750
F–South	202	Sewri (West)	Shraddha Jadhav	SS(UBT)	11,112	Parth Bawkar	BJP	7,982	3,130
F–South	203	Railway Chawl	Shraddha Pednekar	SS(UBT)	16,487	Samidha Bhalekar	SHS	10,002	6,485
F–South	204	KEM Hospital	Kiran Tawde	SS(UBT)	9,797	Anil Kokil	SHS	7,766	2,031
F–South	205	Kala Chowki	Supriya Dalvi	MNS	16,148	Varsha Shinde	BJP	8,231	7,917
F–South	206	Sewri	Sachin Padwal	SS(UBT)	12,989	Sanjay Ambole	SHS	5,226	7,763
E	207	Byculla	Rohidas Lokhande	BJP	8,024	Shalaka Haryan	MNS	6,724	1,300
E	208	Jijamata Garden	Ramakant Rahate	SS(UBT)	11,653	Vijay Lipare	SHS	7,465	4,188
E	209	Darukhana	Yamini Jadhav	SHS	7,974	Rafia Damudi	INC	6,484	1,490
E	210	Tadwadi	Sonam Jamsutkar	SS(UBT)	10,116	Santosh Rane	BJP	8,365	1,751
E	211	New Nagpada	Waqar Khan	INC	13,505	Ejaz Ahmed	SP	9,203	4,302
E	212	Agripada	Amreen Abrahani	SP	8,848	Geeta Gawli	ABS	6,823	2,025
E	213	Kamathipura	Nasima Juneja	INC	12,162	Asha Mamidi	SHS	8,137	4,025
D	214	Mahalakshmi Temple	Ajit Patil	BJP	13,847	Mukesh Bhalerao	MNS	5,476	8,371
D	215	Chikhal Wadi	Santosh Dhale	BJP	11,924	Kiran Balsaraf	SS(UBT)	9,113	2,811
D	216	Dalal Estate	Rajashree Bhatankar	INC	11,048	Gauri Narvankar	BJP	7,532	3,516
D	217	Girgaum Chowpatty	Gaurang Zaveri	BJP	15,317	Nilesh Shirdhankar	MNS	5,440	9,877
D	218	Opera House	Snehal Tendulkar	BJP	16,828	Geeta Ahirekar	SS(UBT)	9,401	7,427
D	219	Malabar Hill	Sunny Sanap	BJP	14,764	Rajendra Gaikwad	SS(UBT)	5,233	9,531
C	220	Nal Bazar	Sampada Mayekar	SS(UBT)	6,936	Dipali Malusare	BJP	6,748	188
C	221	Fanaswadi	Akash Purohit	BJP	6,178	Prithvi Jain	INC	5,277	901
C	222	Dhobi Talao	Rita Makwana	BJP	12,154	Sampat Thakur	SS(UBT)	9,317	2,837
B	223	Princess Dock	Dnyanraj Nikam	INC	8,508	Priya Patil	SHS	8,041	467
B	224	Pydhonie	Rukhsana Amin	INC	8,105	Rubina Teenwala	SP	4,624	3,481
A	225	Colaba	Harshita Narwekar	BJP	11,307	Ajinkya Dhatrak	SS(UBT)	6,423	4,884
A	226	Nariman Point	Makarand Narwekar	BJP	18,058	Tejal Pawar	IND	7,997	10,061
A	227	Navy Nagar	Gauravi Narwekar	BJP	5,184	Rehana Shaikh	SS(UBT)	2,140	3,044

== Mayor & Deputy Mayor Election ==
The Mayor and Deputy Mayor selection for the Brihanmumbai Municipal Corporation (BMC) in 2026 marked the end of the Shiv Sena (UBT)'s (erstwhile undivided Shiv Sena) 25-year dominance over the civic body, with the Bharatiya Janata Party (BJP) getting the mayor’s post for the first time in over four decades.

=== Mayor ===
- Ritu Tawde (BJP), corporator from Ward 132, was selected as the mayoral candidate of the ruling Mahayuti alliance.
- She was elected unopposed, after the Shiv Sena (UBT) decided not to field a challenger.
- The mayor’s post was reserved for a woman candidate from the open category through a lottery system.

=== Deputy Mayor ===
- Sanjay Shankar Ghadi (Shiv Sena – Shinde faction), corporator from Ward 5, was chosen as the deputy mayoral candidate.
- Ghadi will serve as Deputy Mayor for 15 months, with the Shiv Sena planning to rotate the post among its corporators.
- The BJP-led Mahayuti alliance secured a combined strength of 118 corporators, crossing the halfway mark of 114.

=== Election Schedule ===
- The Mumbai mayoral election was scheduled for 11 February 2026, the last date for withdrawal of nominations.

=== Significance ===
- Ritu Tawde’s election makes her the first BJP Mayor of Mumbai in 44 years.
- The outcome ended the Shiv Sena (UBT)’s (erstwhile undivided Shiv Sena) uninterrupted control of the mayor’s post since 1997.

== See also ==
- 2026 elections in India
- Brihanmumbai Municipal Corporation
