= Nandu Satam =

Indian politician

Mayor of Mumbai
- In office 1998–1999
- Preceded by: Vishakha Raut
- Succeeded by: Hareshwar Patil

Personal details
- Born: Maharashtra, India
- Party: Maharashtra Navnirman Sena (2009–present)
- Other political affiliations: Shiv Sena (1966–2009)
- Occupation: Politician
- Known for: First Mayor of Mumbai under the Mayor-in-Council system

Nandu Satam is an Indian politician who served as the 67th Mayor of Mumbai from 1998 to 1999. He was a member of the Shiv Sena for over two decades before joining the Maharashtra Navnirman Sena in 2009. He joined the Maharashtra Navnirman Sena in 2009.

Satam is known for being the first person to hold the office of mayor under the experimental Mayor-in-Council governance model. Prior to his election as Mayor, he served as the Leader of the House in the Brihanmumbai Municipal Corporation.

== Political career ==
Satam was elected Mayor in April 1998. In his tenure, the Mayor-in-Council system was introduced, which granted executive powers to elected representatives. However, the system led to administrative conflicts and delays and was abolished in 1999.

In April 2009, Satam was expelled from the Shiv Sena by party chief Bal Thackeray. Party sources cited his lack of activity in party work and alleged involvement in anti-party activities, as the reasons for his removal.

Immediately following his expulsion, Satam joined the Maharashtra Navnirman Sena in the presence of its founder, Raj Thackeray. He was later appointed as a General Secretary of the Maharashtra Navnirman Sena.

In 1992, while serving as a corporator in the Brihanmumbai Municipal Corporation, he led a group of 70 fellow corporators to Ayodhya to perform kar seva.

== See also ==
- List of mayors of Mumbai
