= 2019 Mangalore City Corporation election =

Local elections in Karnataka

← 2014	12 November 2019	2024 →

All 60 seats in Mangalore City Corporation 31 seats needed for a majority

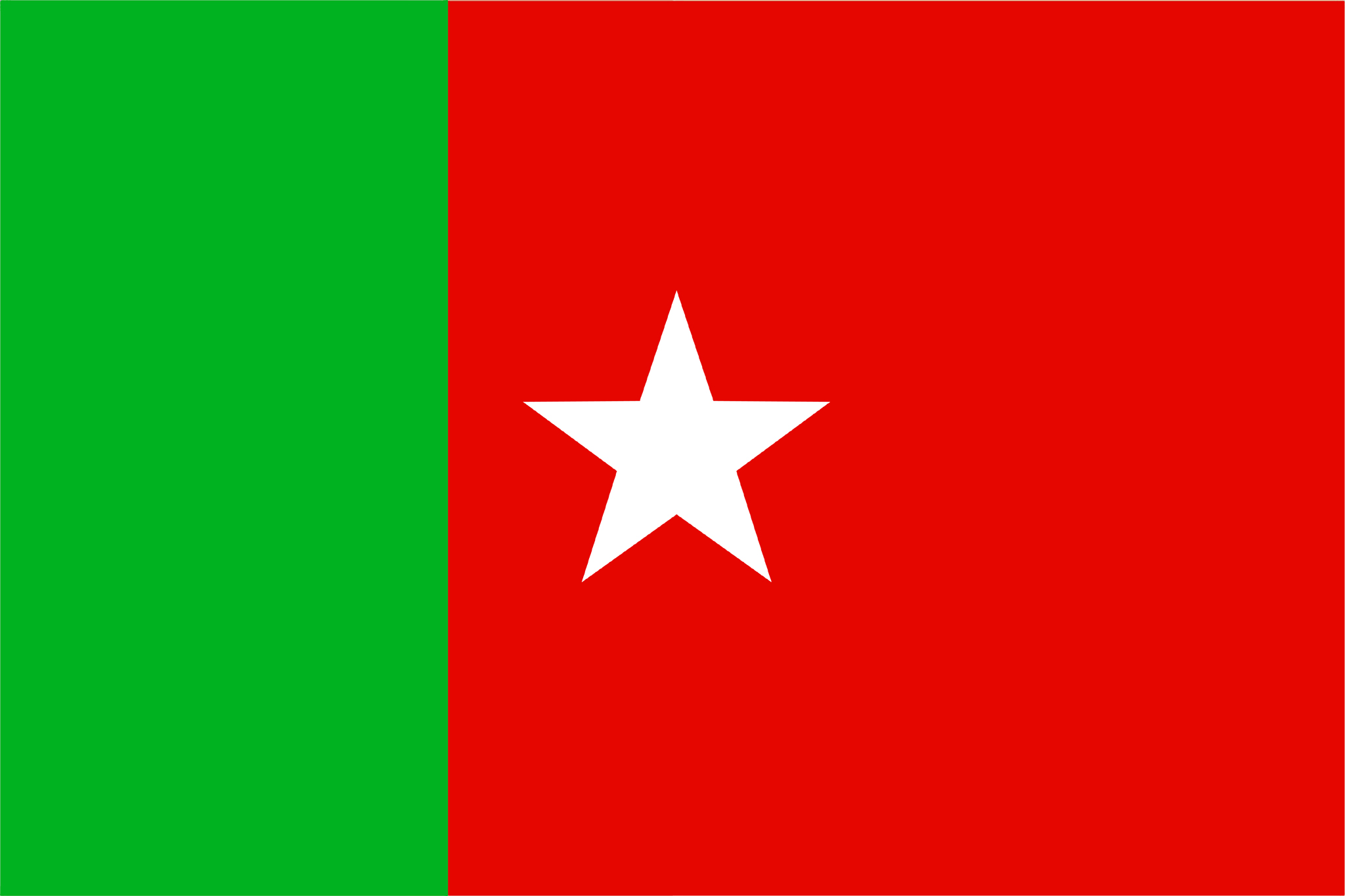
	First party	Second party	Third party
Party	BJP	INC	SDPI
Seats won	44	14	2

The Mangalore City Corporation election, 2019 is an election of members to the Mangalore City Corporation which governs Mangalore.

== Schedule ==
Mangalore City Corporation election was held on 12 November 2019 in a single phase. Results were announced on 14 November 2019.

== Result by party ==
Out of the 60 wards BJP gained victory in 44 wards, Congress won 14 seats and SDPI managed to get 2 seats.

Party	Seats
Bharatiya Janata Party (BJP)	44
Indian National Congress (INC)	14
Social Democratic Party of India (SDPI)	2
Total	60

== Result by Wards ==
Constituency		Winner			Runner Up			Margin
#	Name	Candidate	Party	Votes	Candidate	Party	Votes	Margin
1	Surathkal West	Shobha Rajesh	BJP	985	Revathi Puthran	Ind	760	225
2	Surathkal East	Shwetha A	BJP	2496	Indira	INC	1133	1363
3	Katipalla East	Lokesh Bollaje	BJP	2486	Basheer Ahmed	INC	1680	806
4	Katipalla Krishnapura	Lakshmi Shekar Devadiga	BJP	2675	Savitha Shetty	INC	2127	548
5	Katipalla North	Shamshad Abubakkar	SDPI	2766	Fathima B	INC	881	1885
6	Idya East	Saritha	BJP	2233	Vineetha Rao	INC	1759	474
7	Idya West	Nayana Kotian	BJP	2282	Prathibha Kulai	INC	1710	572
8	Hosabettu	Varun Chowta	BJP	3030	Ashok Shetty	INC	1765	1265
9	Kulai	Vedavathi	BJP	3140	Gayathri	INC	768	2372
10	Baikampady	Sumithra Kariya	BJP	2002	Sudhakara	INC	877	1125
11	Panambur Bengre	Sunitha	BJP	1236	Chandrika	INC	1081	155
12	Panjimogaru	Anil Kumar	INC	1690	Naveen Chandra Poojary	BJP	1359	331
13	Kunjathbail North	Sharath Kumar	BJP	2950	K Mohammed	INC	1709	1241
14	Marakada	Lohith Amin	BJP	2055	Harinath	INC	1704	351
15	Kunjathbail South	Sumangala	BJP	3780	Shalini M N	INC	1684	2096
16	Bengre Kulur	Kiran Kumar	BJP	2308	Panduranga Kukkyan	INC	976	1332
17	Derebail North	Manoj Kumar	BJP	2142	Mallikarjuna	INC	1369	773
18	Kavoor	Gayathri A	BJP	3296	Bhavya	INC	1725	1571
19	Pacchanady	Sangeetha R Nayak	BJP	2700	Vishalakshi	INC	1544	1156
20	Tiruvail	Hemalatha Raghu Salian	BJP	3028	Prathibha R Shetty	INC	1903	1125
21	Padavu West	Vanitha Prasad	BJP	3071	Ashalatha	INC	1499	1572
22	Kadri Padav	Jayananda Anchan	BJP	2484	Umesh	INC	1963	521
23	Derebail East	Rajani L Kotian	BJP	2849	Jyothi L Devadiga	INC	1583	1266
24	Derebail South	Shashidhar Hegde	INC	2235	Charith Kumar	BJP	1908	327
25	Derebail West	Jayalakshmi V Shetty	BJP	2233	Roopa Chethan	INC	1331	902
26	Derebail Central	Ganesh Kulal	BJP	3052	Padmanabha Amin	INC	1275	1777
27	Boloor	Jagadish Shetty	BJP	2360	Kamalaksha Salian	INC	988	1372
28	Mannagudda	Sandhya	BJP	3019	Meghanadas	INC	698	2321
29	Kambla	Leelavathi Prakash	BJP	1884	Rekha Surekha	INC	518	1366
30	Kodialbail	Sudeer Shetty Kannur	BJP	1846	Prakash B Salian	INC	1661	185
31	Bejai	Lancelot Pinto	INC	1939	Prashanth Alva	BJP	1527	412
32	Kadri North	Shakeela Kava	BJP	1813	Mamatha Shetty	INC	791	1022
33	Kadri South	Manohar Shetty	BJP	1526	D K Ashok	INC	1277	249
34	Shivbagh	Kavya Natraj	BJP	1731	Kiran James Peter	INC	1690	41
35	Padavu Central	Kishore Kottari	BJP	2200	Abdul Azeez	INC	610	1590
36	Padav East	Bhaskar K	INC	2492	Sujan Das	BJP	1921	571
37	Maroli	Keshava	INC	2037	Kiran Devadiga	BJP	2011	26
38	Bendoor	Naveen R D Souza	INC	1598	Jessel D Souza	BJP	760	838
39	Falnir	Jacintha Alfred	INC	1762	Asha D Silva	BJP	1423	339
40	Court	Vinayaraj A C	INC	1137	Ranganath Kini	BJP	899	238
41	Central Market	Poornima	BJP	2037	Mamatha Shenoy	INC	428	1609
42	Donkarakery	Jayashree Kudva	BJP	2140	Manjula Nayak	INC	694	1446
43	Kudroli	Shamshudin	INC	1256	Arshad	BJP	877	379
44	Bunder	Zeenath	INC	1308	Priyanka	BJP	1281	27
45	Port	Abdul Lateef	INC	2043	Anil Kumar	BJP	1493	550
46	Cantonment	Diwakar	BJP	1793	K Bhaskar Rao	INC	307	1486
47	Milagres	Abdul Rauf	INC	1702	Ghanshyam	BJP	957	745
48	Kankanady Valencia	Sandeep Garodi	BJP	1425	Ashith Gregory	INC	1271	154
49	Kankanady	Praveen Chandra Alva	INC	2653	Vijay Kumar Shetty	BJP	1634	1019
50	Alape South	Shobha Poojary	BJP	2269	Sesamma	INC	1576	693
51	Alape North	Roopashree Poojary	BJP	2083	Shobha K	INC	2007	76
52	Kannur	Chandravathi Vishwanath	BJP	1862	Raziya	INC	1591	271
53	Bajal	Ashraf	INC	1660	Chandrashekara	BJP	1476	184
54	Jeppinamogaru	Veena Mangala	BJP	2102	Madhushree	INC	1101	1001
55	Attavara	Shailesh Shetty	BJP	1854	Keerthi Raj	INC	1660	194
56	Mangaladevi	Premananda Shetty	BJP	2187	Dinesh V Rao	INC	874	1313
57	Hoigebazar	Revathi	BJP	2116	Sharmila	INC	1258	858
58	Bolara	Bhanumathi P S	BJP	1541	Rathikala	INC	1348	193
59	Jeppu	Bharath Kumar S	BJP	2479	T Honnaya	INC	1575	904
60	Bengre	Muneeb Bengre	SDPI	1701	Gangadhar Salian	BJP	1498	203
