= Yashwant Jadhav =

Indian politician

Standing Committee Chairman, Brihanmumbai Municipal Corporation
- Incumbent
- Assumed office April 2018
- Preceded by: Ramesh Korgaonkar

Leader of the House, Brihanmumbai Municipal Corporation
- In office 2017–2018
- Preceded by: Trushna Vishwasrao
- Succeeded by: Vishakha Raut

Chairman of Market and Garden Committee, BMC
- In office 2008–2010

Personal details
- Party: Shiv Sena
- Relations: Yamini Jadhav (Wife)
- Occupation: Politician

Yashwant Jadhav is an Indian politician and Shiv Sena leader from Mumbai, Maharashtra. He is the leader of the House in Brihanmumbai Municipal Corporation. He had worked on several committees in the municipal corporation such as Standing committee, Market and Garden Committee, Civil Works Committee etc.

== Positions held ==
- 1997: Elected as corporator in Brihanmumbai Municipal Corporation
- 2007: Re-elected as corporator in Brihanmumbai Municipal Corporation
- 2008: Elected as Chairman of Market and Garden Committee
- 2011 Onwards: Deputy Leader, Shiv Sena
- 2017: Re-elected as corporator in Brihanmumbai Municipal Corporation
- 2017: Appointed as leader of the House in Brihanmumbai Municipal Corporation
- 2018: Elected as Standing Committee Chairman Brihanmumbai Municipal Corporation
