= List of urban local bodies in Maharashtra =

Maharashtra has 29 Municipal Corporations, 232 Municipal councils and 125 Nagar Panchayats.

These urban local bodies are governed by Maharashtra Municipal Corporations Act, 1949, Mumbai Municipal Corporation Act, 1888 and The Maharashtra Municipal Councils, Nagar Panchayats and Industrial Townships Act, 1965.

== List of municipal corporations ==
Municipal Corporations in Maharashtra are further classified into 5 category.

Class A+
S.No	Name	Url
1	Brihanmumbai Municipal Corporation	http://www.mcgm.gov.in/

Class A
S.No	Name	Url
1	Nagpur Municipal Corporation	https://www.nmcnagpur.gov.in/
2	Pune Municipal Corporation	https://pmc.gov.in/landing/mar.html

Class B
S.No	Name	Url
1	Thane Municipal Corporation	https://thanecity.gov.in/tmc/CitizenHome.html
2	Nashik Municipal Corporation	https://www.nmc.gov.in/
3	Pimpri-Chinchwad Municipal Corporation	https://www.pcmcindia.gov.in/marathi/

Class C
S.No	Name	Url
1	Aurangabad Municipal Corporation	https://aurangabadmahapalika.org/
2	Vasai-Virar City Municipal Corporation	https://vvcmc.in/
3	Kalyan-Dombivli Municipal Corporation	https://kdmc.gov.in/kdmc/CitizenHome.html
4	Navi Mumbai Municipal Corporation	https://www.nmmc.gov.in/navimumbai/

Class D
S.No	Name	Url
1	Akola Municipal Corporation	https://amcakola.in/
2	Amravati Municipal Corporation	https://amtcorp.org/
3	Latur City Municipal Corporation	https://mclatur.org/
4	Nanded-Waghala City Municipal Corporation	https://www.nwcmc.gov.in/web/home?uid=1&id=MAR
5	Parbhani City Municipal Corporation	http://pcmcparbhani.gov.in/
6	Panvel Municipal Corporation	https://www.panvelcorporation.com/
7	Mira-Bhayandar Municipal Corporation	https://www.mbmc.gov.in/
8	Ulhasnagar Municipal Corporation	http://www.umc.gov.in:8080/umc/UMCWEB/English/index.html
9	Chandrapur City Municipal Corporation	https://www.cmcchandrapur.com/pages/home.php
10	Dhule Municipal Corporation	http://www.dhulecorporation.org/singleIndex.jsp?orgid=86
11	Jalgaon City Municipal Corporation	http://www.jcmc.gov.in/
12	Malegaon Municipal Corporation	http://malegaoncorporation.org/website/
13	Kolhapur Municipal Corporation	https://www.kolhapurcorporation.gov.in/
14	Sangli, Miraj and Kupwad City Municipal Corporation	https://smkc.gov.in/
15	Solapur Municipal Corporation	https://www.solapurcorporation.gov.in/
16	Ichalkaranji Municipal Corporation	https://ichalkaranjimnp.in/
17	Jalna City Municipal Corporation	https://jcmcjalna.org/
18	Bhiwandi-Nizampur City Municipal Corporation	https://www.bncmc.gov.in/
19	Ahmednagar Municipal Corporation	https://amc.gov.in/

== List of municipal councils ==
Class A
S.No	Name	Url
1	Achalpur Municipal Council	
2	Yavatmal Municipal Council	
3	Beed Municipal Council	
4	Udgir Municipal Council	
5	Osmanabad Municipal Council	
6	Ambarnath Municipal Council	
7	Kulgaon Badlapur Municipal Council	
8	Gondia Municipal Council	
9	Hinganghat Municipal Council	
10	Wardha Municipal Council	
11	Bhusawal Municipal Council	
12	Nandurbar Municipal Council	
13	Baramati Municipal Council	
14	Satara Municipal Council	
15	Barshi Municipal Council	

Class B
S.No	Name	Url
1	Khamgaon Municipal Council	
2	Shegaon Municipal Council	
3	Buldhana Municipal Council	
4	chikhli Municipal Council	
5	Malkapur Municipal Council	
6	Nandura Municipal Council	
7	Mehkar Municipal Council	
8	Akot Municipal Council	
9	Balapur Municipal Council	
10	Anjangaon Surji Municipal Council	
11	Murtizapur Municipal Council	
12	Warud Municipal Council	
13	Washim Municipal Council	
14	Karanja Municipal Council	
15	Wani Municipal Council	
16	Pusad Municipal Council	
17	Digras Municipal Council	
18	Umarkhed Municipal Council	
19	Kannad Municipal Council	
20	Vaijapur Municipal Council	
21	Paithan Municipal Council	
22	Sillod Municipal Council	
23	Ambejogai Municipal Council	
24	Majalgaon Municipal Council	
25	Parli Vaijinath Municipal Council	
26	Hingoli Municipal Council	
27	Basmatnagar Municipal Council	
28	Ahmedpur Municipal Council	
29	Deglur Municipal Council	
30	Sailu Municipal Council	
31	Gangakhed Municipal Council	
32	Jintur Municipal Council	
33	Dahanu Municipal Council	
34	Palghar Municipal Council	
35	Khopoli Municipal Council	
36	Ratnagiri Municipal Council	
37	Chiplun Municipal Council	
38	Bhandara Municipal Council	
39	Tumsar Municipal Council	
40	Warora Municipal Council	
41	Bhadravati Municipal Council	
42	Ballarpur Municipal Council	
43	Gadchiroli Municipal Council	
44	Katol Municipal Council	
45	Umred Municipal Council	
46	Wadi Municipal Council	
47	Kamptee Municipal Council	
48	Arvi Municipal Council	
49	Shrirampur Municipal Council	
50	Sangamner Municipal Council	
51	Kopargaon Municipal Council	
52	Shirpur-Varwade Municipal Council	
53	Dondaicha-Varwade Municipal Council	
54	Jamner Municipal Council	
55	Chopda Municipal Council	
56	Amalner Municipal Council	
57	Chalisgaon Municipal Council	
58	Pachora Municipal Council	
59	Shahada Municipal Council	
60	Sinnar Municipal Council	
61	Yeola Municipal Council	
62	Manmad Municipal Council	
63	Jaysingpur Municipal Council	
64	Talegaon Dhabade Municipal Council	
65	Daund Municipal Council	
66	Chakan Municipal Council	
67	Lonavala Municipal Council	
68	Vita Municipal Council	
69	Islampur Municipal Council	
70	Karad Municipal Council	
71	Phaltan Municipal Council	
72	Pandharpur Municipal Council	
73	Akkalkot Municipal Council	

Class C
S.No	Name	Url
1	Deulgaon Raja Municipal Council	
2	Sindkhed Raja Municipal Council	
3	Lonar Municipal Council	
4	Jalgaon Jamod Municipal Council	
5	Dhamangaon Municipal Council	
6	Daryapur Municipal Council	
7	ChandurRailway Municipal Council	
8	ChandurBazaar Municipal Council	
9	Morshi Municipal Council	
10	Telhara Municipal Council	
11	Patur Municipal Council	
12	Chikhaldara Municipal Council	
13	Shendurjana Ghat Municipal Council	
14	Mangrulpir Municipal Council	
15	Risod Municipal Council	
16	Darwha Municipal Council	
17	Ghatanji Municipal Council	
18	Ner Nababpur Nagar Parishad	
19	Pandharkawada Municipal Council	
20	Arni Municipal Council	
21	Gangapur Municipal Council	
22	Khuldabad Municipal Council	
23	Dharur Municipal Council	
24	Gevrai Municipal Council	
25	Kalamnuri Municipal Council	
26	Ambad Municipal Council	
27	Bhokardan Municipal Council	
28	Partur Municipal Council	
29	Nilanga Municipal Council	
30	Ausa Municipal Council	
31	Umri Municipal Council	
32	Kundalwadi Municipal Council	
33	Mudkhed Municipal Council	
34	Mukhed Municipal Council	
35	Dharmabad Municipal Council	
36	Biloli Municipal Council	
37	Hadgaon Municipal Council	
38	Kinwat Municipal Council	
39	Kandhar Municipal Council	
40	Bhokar Municipal Council	
41	Loha Municipal Council	
42	Bhoom Municipal Council	
43	Tuljapur Municipal Council	
44	Murum Municipal Council	
45	Kalamb Municipal Council	
46	Paranda Municipal Council	
47	Omerga Municipal Council	
48	Naldurg Municipal Council	
49	Manwath Municipal Council	
50	Pathri Municipal Council	
51	Purna Municipal Council	
52	Sonpeth Municipal Council	
53	Jawhar Municipal Council	
54	Alibag Municipal Council	
55	Shrivardhan Municipal Council	
56	Karjat Municipal Council	
57	Roha Municipal Council	
58	Mahad Municipal Council	
59	Murud-Janjira Municipal Council	
60	Pen Municipal Council	
61	Uran Municipal Council	
62	Matheran Municipal Council	
63	Khed Municipal Council	
64	Rajapur Municipal Council	
65	Vengurla Municipal Council	
66	Malvan Municipal Council	
67	Sawantvadi Municipal Council	
68	Sakoli Municipal Council	
69	Pavani Municipal Council	
70	Nagbhid Municipal Council	
71	Gadchandur Municipal Council	
72	Chimur Municipal Council	
73	Mool Municipal Council	
74	Rajura Municipal Council	
75	Bramhapuri Municipal Council	
76	Desaiganj (Wadsa) Municipal Council	
77	Tirora Municipal Council	
78	Kanhann Pimpari Municipal Council	
79	Mohapa Municipal Council	
80	Khapa Municipal Council	
81	Ramtek Municipal Council	
82	Mowad Municipal Council	
83	Narkhed Municipal Council	
84	Wanadongari Municipal Council	
85	Savner Municipal Council	
86	Kalmeshwar Municipal Council	
87	Pulgaon Municipal Council	
88	Sindi Municipal Council	
89	Deoli Municipal Council	
90	Devlali Pravara Municipal Council	
91	Rahata Pimplas Municipal Council	
92	Pathardi Municipal Council	
93	Sevgaon Municipal Council	
94	Jamkhed Municipal Council	
95	Rahuri Municipal Council	
96	Srigonda Municipal Council	
97	Bhadgaon Municipal Council	
98	Dharangaon Municipal Council	
99	Erandol Municipal Council	
100	Faizpur Municipal Council	
101	Yawal Municipal Council	
102	Varangaon Municipal Council	
103	Raver Municipal Council	
104	Parola Municipal Council	
105	Savda Municipal Council	
106	Navapur Municipal Council	
107	Taloda Municipal Council	
108	Chandwad Municipal Council	
109	Trimbak Municipal Council	
110	Bhagur Municipal Council	
111	Satana Municipal Council	
112	Nandgaon Municipal Council	
113	Igatpuri Municipal Council	
114	Kagal Municipal Council	
115	Gadhinglaj Municipal Council	
116	Vadgaon Municipal Council	
117	Murgud Municipal Council	
118	Kurundwad Municipal Council	
119	Panhala Municipal Council	
120	Malkapur Municipal Council	
121	Bhor Municipal Council	
122	Rajgurunagar Municipal Council	
123	Alandi Municipal Council	
124	Saswad Municipal Council	
125	Junnar Municipal Council	
126	Indapur Municipal Council	
127	Shirur Municipal Council	
128	Jejuri Municipal Council	
129	Jat Municipal Council	
130	Ashta Municipal Council	
131	Tasgaon Municipal Council	
132	Palus Municipal Council	
133	Panchgani Municipal Council	
134	Wai Municipal Council	
135	Mahabaleshwar Municipal Council	
136	Mhaswad Municipal Council	
137	Rahimatpur Municipal Council	
138	Mohol Municipal Council	
139	Maindargi Municipal Council	
140	Sangola Municipal Council	
141	Karmala Municipal Council	
142	Dudhani Municipal Council	
143	Mangalwedha Municipal Council	
144	Kurduvadi Municipal Council	
145	Pali Municipal Council	

== List of Nagar Panchayats ==
Division	District	Name
AMRAVATI	Akola	Barshi Takali Nagar Panchayat
AMRAVATI	Amravati	Bhatkuli Nagar Panchayat
AMRAVATI	Amravati	Nandgaon Khandeshwar Nagar Panchayat
AMRAVATI	Amravati	Dharani Nagar Panchayat
AMRAVATI	Amravati	Teosa Nagar Panchayat
AMRAVATI	Buldhana	Motala Nagar Panchayat
AMRAVATI	Buldhana	Sangrampur Nagar Panchayat
AMRAVATI	Washim	Malegaon Nagar Panchayat
AMRAVATI	Washim	Manora Nagar Panchayat
AMRAVATI	Yavatmal	Zari Jamni Nagar Panchayat
AMRAVATI	Yavatmal	Ralegaon Nagar Panchayat
AMRAVATI	Yavatmal	Babhulgaon Nagar Panchayat
AMRAVATI	Yavatmal	Dhanki Nagar Panchayat
AMRAVATI	Yavatmal	Mahagaon Nagar Panchayat
AMRAVATI	Yavatmal	Maregaon Nagar Panchayat
AMRAVATI	Yavatmal	Kalamb Nagar Panchayat
AURANGABAD	Aurangabad	Soyagaon Nagar Panchayat
AURANGABAD	Aurangabad	Phulambri Nagar Panchayat
AURANGABAD	Beed	Shirur Kasar Nagar Panchayat
AURANGABAD	Beed	Kej Nagar Panchayat
AURANGABAD	Beed	Wadwani Nagar Panchayat
AURANGABAD	Beed	Patoda Nagar Panchayat
AURANGABAD	Beed	Ashti Nagar Panchayat
AURANGABAD	Hingoli	Sengaon Nagar Panchayat
AURANGABAD	Hingoli	Aundha Nagnath Nagar Panchayat
AURANGABAD	Jalna	Badnapur Nagar Panchayat
AURANGABAD	Jalna	Mantha Nagar Panchayat
AURANGABAD	Jalna	Ghansawangi Nagar Panchayat
AURANGABAD	Jalna	Japharabad Nagar Panchayat
AURANGABAD	Latur	Shirur Anantpal Nagar Panchayat
AURANGABAD	Latur	Deoni Nagar Panchayat
AURANGABAD	Latur	Jalkot Nagar Panchayat
AURANGABAD	Latur	Chakur Nagar Panchayat
AURANGABAD	Latur	Renapur Nagar Panchayat
AURANGABAD	Nanded	Ardhapur Nagar Panchayat
AURANGABAD	Nanded	Mahur Nagar Panchayat
AURANGABAD	Nanded	Naygaon Nagar Panchayat
AURANGABAD	Nanded	Himayatnagar Nagar Panchayat
AURANGABAD	Osmanabad	Lohara Bu Nagar Panchayat
AURANGABAD	Osmanabad	Washi Nagar Panchayat
AURANGABAD	Parbhani	Palam Nagar Panchayat
KONKAN	Palghar	Talasari Nagar Panchayat
KONKAN	Palghar	Wada Nagar Panchayat
KONKAN	Palghar	Vikramgad Nagar Panchayat
KONKAN	Palghar	Mokhada Nagar Panchayat
KONKAN	Raigad	Mhasala Nagar Panchayat
KONKAN	Raigad	Mangaon Nagar Panchayat
KONKAN	Raigad	Khalapur Nagar Panchayat
KONKAN	Raigad	Poladpur Nagar Panchayat
KONKAN	Raigad	Tala Nagar Panchayat
KONKAN	Ratnagiri	Lanja Nagar Panchayat
KONKAN	Ratnagiri	Devrukh Nagar Panchayat
KONKAN	Ratnagiri	Guhagar Nagar Panchayat
KONKAN	Ratnagiri	Mandangad Nagar Panchayat
KONKAN	Ratnagiri	Dapoli Municipal Council
KONKAN	Sindhudurg	Devgadjamsande Nagar Panchayat
KONKAN	Sindhudurg	Kankavli Municipal Council
KONKAN	Sindhudurg	Kasai-Dodamarg Nagar Panchayat
KONKAN	Sindhudurg	Vaibhavwadi Nagar Panchayat
KONKAN	Sindhudurg	Kudal Nagar Panchayat
KONKAN	Thane	Murbad Nagar Panchayat
KONKAN	Thane	Shahapur Nagar Panchayat
NAGPUR	Bhandara	Lakhani Nagar Panchayat
NAGPUR	Bhandara	Mohadi Nagar Panchayat
NAGPUR	Bhandara	Lakhandur Nagar Panchayat
NAGPUR	Chandrapur	Jiwati Nagar Panchayat
NAGPUR	Chandrapur	Sindewahi Nagar Panchayat
NAGPUR	Chandrapur	Pombhurna Nagar Panchayat
NAGPUR	Chandrapur	Korpana Nagar Panchayat
NAGPUR	Chandrapur	Gondpimpri Nagar Panchayat
NAGPUR	Chandrapur	Sawali Nagar Panchayat
NAGPUR	Gadchiroli	Dhanora Nagar Panchayat
NAGPUR	Gadchiroli	Chamoshi Nagar Panchayat
NAGPUR	Gadchiroli	Korchi Nagar Panchayat
NAGPUR	Gadchiroli	Kurkheda Nagar Panchayat
NAGPUR	Gadchiroli	Mulchera Nagar Panchayat
NAGPUR	Gadchiroli	Sironcha Nagar Panchayat
NAGPUR	Gadchiroli	Armori Nagar Panchayat
NAGPUR	Gadchiroli	Aetapalli Nagar Panchayat
NAGPUR	Gadchiroli	Bhamragad Nagar Panchayat
NAGPUR	Gadchiroli	Ahiri Nagar Panchayat
NAGPUR	Gondia	Arjuni Nagar Panchayat
NAGPUR	Gondia	Amgaon Nagar Panchayat
NAGPUR	Gondia	Goregaon Nagar Panchayat
NAGPUR	Gondia	Sadak-Arjuni Nagar Panchayat
NAGPUR	Gondia	Salekasa Nagar Panchayat
NAGPUR	Gondia	Deori Nagar Panchayat
NAGPUR	Nagpur	Parshiwani Nagar Panchayat
NAGPUR	Nagpur	Hingana Nagar Panchayat
NAGPUR	Nagpur	Dhiwapur Nagar Panchayat
NAGPUR	Nagpur	Mahadula Municipal Council
NAGPUR	Nagpur	Mouda Municipal Council
NAGPUR	Nagpur	Kuhi Nagar Panchayat
NAGPUR	Wardha	Ashti Nagar Panchayat
NAGPUR	Wardha	Selu Nagar Panchayat
NAGPUR	Wardha	Karanja Nagar Panchayat
NAGPUR	Wardha	Samudrapur Nagar Panchayat
NASIK	Ahmednagar	Parner Nagar Panchayat
NASIK	Ahmednagar	Nevasa Nagar Panchayat
NASIK	Ahmednagar	Akole Nagar Panchayat
NASIK	Ahmednagar	Karjat Nagar Panchayat
NASIK	Ahmednagar	Shirdi Nagar Panchayat
NASIK	Dhule	Sindkheda Municipal Council
NASIK	Dhule	Sakri Nagar Panchayat
NASIK	Jalgaon	Bodvad Nagar Panchayat
NASIK	Nandurbar	Dhadgaon Wadphalya-Roshmal Bu Nagar Panchayat
NASIK	Nashik	Kalawan Nagar Panchayat
NASIK	Nashik	Peth Nagar Panchayat
NASIK	Nashik	Niphad Nagar Panchayat
NASIK	Nashik	Surgana Nagar Panchayat
NASIK	Nashik	Devala Nagar Panchayat
NASIK	Nashik	Dindori Nagar Panchayat
PUNE	Sangli	Shirala Nagar Panchayat
PUNE	Sangli	Khanapur Nagar Panchayat
PUNE	Sangli	Kadegaon Nagar Panchayat
PUNE	Sangli	Kavathemahankal Nagar Panchayat
PUNE	Satara	Medha Nagar Panchayat
PUNE	Satara	Dahivadi Nagar Panchayat
PUNE	Satara	Malkapur Municipal Council
PUNE	Satara	Patan Nagar Panchayat
PUNE	Satara	Lonand Nagar Panchayat
PUNE	Satara	Koregaon Nagar Panchayat
PUNE	Satara	Khandala Nagar Panchayat
PUNE	Satara	Vaduj Nagar Panchayat
PUNE	Solapur	Madha Nagar Panchayat
PUNE	Solapur	Malshiras Nagar Panchayat
PUNE	Solapur	Natepute Nagar Panchayat
