= Milind Vaidya =

Indian politician

- मिलिंद वैद्य

Mayor of Mumbai
- In office 1996–1997
- Preceded by: R. T. Kadam
- Succeeded by: Vishakha Raut

Personal details
- Party: Shiv Sena

Milind Vaidya (Marathi: मिलिंद वैद्य) is a Shiv Sena politician from Mumbai. He was the former Mayor of Brihanmumbai Municipal Corporation.

== Positions held ==
- 1992: Elected as corporator in Brihanmumbai Municipal Corporation
- 1996: Elected as Mayor of Brihanmumbai Municipal Corporation
- 2011: Re-elected as corporator in Brihanmumbai Municipal Corporation
- 2017: Re-elected as corporator in Brihanmumbai Municipal Corporation
- 2017: Elected as Chairman of G North ward Committee Brihanmumbai Municipal Corporation
