= Vishakha Raut =

Indian politician

Leader of the House, Brihanmumbai Municipal Corporation
- Incumbent
- Assumed office April 2018
- Preceded by: Yashwant Jadhav

Mayor of Mumbai
- In office 1997–1998
- Preceded by: Milind Vaidya
- Succeeded by: Nandu Satam

Member of Maharastra Legislative Assembly
- In office 1999-2004
- Preceded by: Manohar Joshi
- Succeeded by: Sada Sarvankar
- Constituency: Dadar (Vidhan Sabha constituency)

Personal details
- Party: Shiv Sena

Vishakha Raut is a Shiv Sena politician from Mumbai. She was the former Mayor of Brihanmumbai Municipal Corporation. She had also represented the Dadar Assembly Constituency from 1999 to 2004 in Maharashtra Legislative Assembly.

== Positions held ==
- 1997: Elected as corporator in Brihanmumbai Municipal Corporation
- 1997: Elected as Mayor of Brihanmumbai Municipal Corporation
- 1999: Elected to Maharashtra Legislative Assembly
- 2010 Onwards: Deputy Leader, Shiv Sena
- 2017: Re-elected as corporator in Brihanmumbai Municipal Corporation
- 2017: Elected as Chairman of Civil Works Committee Brihanmumbai Municipal Corporation
- 2018: Appointed as leader of the House in Brihanmumbai Municipal Corporation
