= Ritu Tawde =

Mayor of Mumbai

Mayor of Mumbai
- Incumbent
- Assumed office 7 February 2026
- Preceded by: Kishori Pednekar

Personal details
- Born: 18 April 1972 (age 54) Mumbai, Maharashtra.
- Party: Bharatiya Janata Party (2012-Present)
- Other political affiliations: Indian National Congress (Before 2012)
- Spouse: Rajesh Madhukar Tawde
- Children: 2

Ritu Rajesh Tawde (born 18 April 1972) is an Indian politician who is currently serving as the mayor of Mumbai (head of the Brihanmumbai Municipal Corporation) since February 2026. A senior leader of the Bharatiya Janata Party (BJP), she previously served as a corporator from Ghatkopar and chaired the BMC Education Committee. She is the first mayor elected after the long-delayed BMC civic polls concluded in early 2026.

== Political career ==
Tawde began her political journey with the Indian National Congress party and joined the Bharatiya Janata Party in 2012. She is regarded within the party as a senior corporator and an aggressive Marathi face. She represented Ward No. 127 (Ghatkopar) as a corporator for multiple terms and currently represents Ward 132.

=== Election as Mayor (2026) ===
Following the BMC elections held in January 2026, the BJP emerged as the largest party. Ritu Tawde was nominated by the party for the mayoral post. On 7 February 2026, she won the election held at the BMC headquarters (Town Hall), defeating the opposition alliance candidate.

In her inaugural speech, she emphasized "Urban Transformation" and "Monsoon Preparedness" as her top priorities for the city.

=== Stand-up comedy ban controversy and criticism ===
In June 2026, Tawde attracted significant media attention and widespread public backlash after calling for a statewide ban on stand-up comedy shows in Maharashtra. The controversy stemmed from a viral video from a show hosted by comedian Pranit More, which featured remarks by an audience member, Sejal Pawar, a medical student at KEM Hospital. Tawde characterized the content, which included comments regarding medical cadavers, as "obscene" and "against Indian culture," asserting that such performances were "spoiling the youth." Following her statement, the Maharashtra Cyber Police registered a First Information Report (FIR) against More and others under the Bharatiya Nyaya Sanhita and the Information Technology Act, 2000, and Tawde announced she would formally request a ban from Chief Minister Devendra Fadnavis.

Tawde's call for a complete ban drew heavy criticism from civil liberties groups, comedians, and opposition political parties, who accused her of authoritarian censorship and political deflection. Critics argued that utilizing state machinery and police FIRs against artists was a direct assault on the freedom of speech and expression guaranteed under Article 19(1)(a) of the Constitution. Representatives from the comedy and arts communities labeled her position "regressive" and an overreach of civic authority, arguing that her invocation of "protecting Indian culture" was an attempt to enforce moral policing across the state. Furthermore, opposition leaders alleged that Tawde was intentionally magnifying a minor viral video controversy to divert public and media attention away from pressing municipal failures, such as water shortages and inadequate monsoon infrastructure planning ahead of the rainy season.

== Positions held ==
Period	Position	Organization
2012–2017	Chairperson, Education Committee	Brihanmumbai Municipal Corporation
2007–2022	Corporator, Ward 127 (Ghatkopar)	Brihanmumbai Municipal Corporation
2026–present	Corporator, Ward 132	Brihanmumbai Municipal Corporation
2026–present	Mayor of Mumbai	Brihanmumbai Municipal Corporation
