= Kishori Pednekar =

Indian politician

Mayor of Mumbai
- In office 22 November 2019 – 8 March 2022
- Preceded by: Vishwanath Mahadeshwar
- Succeeded by: Ritu Tawde

Personal details
- Born: 25 December 1962 (age 63)
- Party: Shiv Sena (Uddhav Balasaheb Thackeray) (2022–present); Shiv Sena (until 2022)

Kishori Pednekar (born 25 December 1962) is an Indian politician who served as the mayor of Brihanmumbai Municipal Corporation (BMC), which is India's richest municipal corporation. She was elected as Mayor without any opposition. She worked as a nurse in her earlier career before becoming a politician and again in 2020; this time to motivate other healthcare workers during the COVID-19 pandemic.

She was awarded Newsmakers Achievers Awards in 2022.

== Early career ==
She joined Shiv Sena after her marriage. She became corporator in 2002 from Lower Parel area in Mumbai. Currently she is a part of Shiv Sena (Uddhav Balasaheb Thackeray) party.

From November 2019 till March 2022, Pednekar served as the Mayor of Mumbai.

== Controversies ==
Pednekar was accused of being involved in a scam during the COVID-19 pandemic, where the BMC was found to have favored giving contracts for procuring medical kits to Sujit Patkar. Patkar was reported to be an aid of Shiv Sena leader Sanjay Raut, who was also implicated in the fraud.

Following a parody musical video released by radio jockey Malishka Mendonsa in July 2017, which criticized the BMC for incompetence in dealing with and fixing potholed roads, Pednekar, who was a corporator then, came in crosshairs with the RJ and targeted her with a poetic verse. The parody video did not go down well with BMC officials and Shiv Sena leaders, who slapped a notice to the RJ for defamation with a penalty of Rs 10,000.

== Positions held ==
- 2002: Elected as corporator in Brihanmumbai Municipal Corporation (Ward No 52)
- 2012: Re-elected as corporator in Brihanmumbai Municipal Corporation (Ward 191)
- 2017: Re-Elected as corporator in Brihanmumbai Municipal Corporation (Ward 199).
- 2018: Elected as Mayor of Brihanmumbai Municipal Corporation
