= Trushna Vishwasrao =

Indian politician

Leader of the House, Brihanmumbai Municipal Corporation
- In office 2014–2017
- Preceded by: Yashodhar Phanse
- Succeeded by: Yashwant Jadhav

Chairman of Market and Garden Committee, Brihanmumbai Municipal Corporation
- In office 2002–2004

Personal details
- Party: Shiv Sena
- Occupation: Politician

Trushna Vishwasrao is a Shiv Sena politician from Mumbai, Maharashtra. In 2014, she became the first female corporator to be leader of the House in Brihanmumbai Municipal Corporation. She had been on several committees in the municipal corporation such as Standing committee, Law Committee, Improvement Committee, Education Committee, Best Committee etc.

== Positions held ==
- 1992: Elected as corporator in Bombay Municipal Corporation (1st term)
- 1997: Re-elected as corporator in Brihanmumbai Municipal Corporation (2nd term)
- 2002: Re-elected as corporator in Brihanmumbai Municipal Corporation (3rd term)
- 2002: Elected as Chairman of Market and Garden Committee
- 2012: Re-elected as corporator in Brihanmumbai Municipal Corporation (4th term)
- 2013: Elected as Chairman of ‘F’ South/North Ward Committee
- 2014: Appointed as leader of the House in Brihanmumbai Municipal Corporation
- 2017: Elected as corporator in Brihanmumbai Municipal Corporation
