= Brihanmumbai Municipal Corporation =

Administrative body for the city of Mumbai

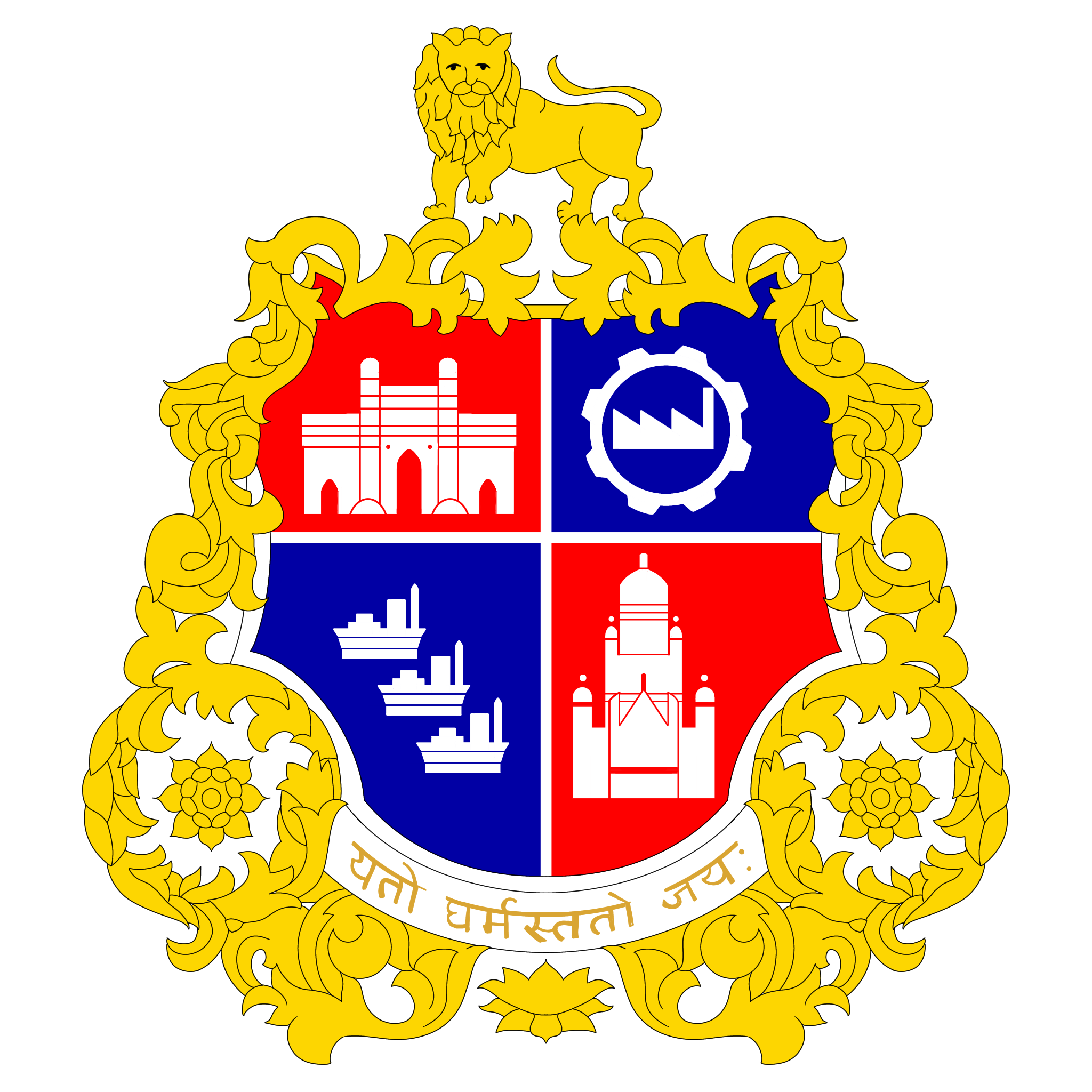
- Emblem of the Brihanmumbai Municipal Corporation

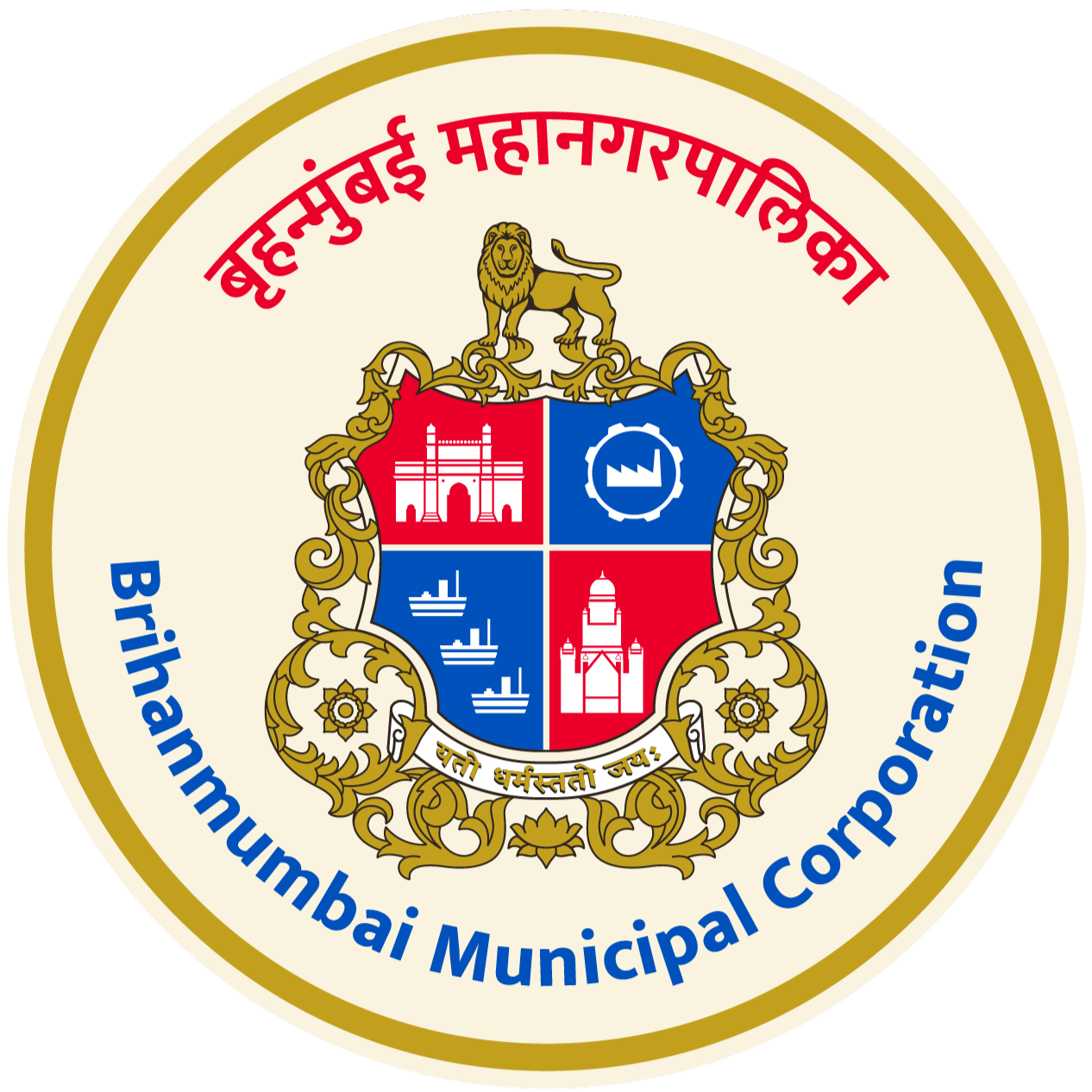
- Seal of Brihanmumbai Municipal Corporation

Type
- Type: Municipal Corporation

History
- Founded: 1889; 137 years ago

Leadership
- Mayor: Ritu Tawde, BJP
- Deputy Mayor: Sanjay Ghadi, SHS
- Municipal Commissioner: Ashwini Bhide, IAS

Structure
- Seats: 227
- Political groups: Government (118): BJP (89); SHS (29); Opposition (109): SS(UBT) (65); INC (24); AIMIM (8); MNS (6); NCP (3); SP (2); NCP-SP (1)
- Length of term: 5 years

Elections
- Last election: 15 January 2026
- Next election: 2031

Motto
- यतो धर्मस्ततो जय: (Sanskrit); Where there is Righteousness, there shall be Victory

Meeting place
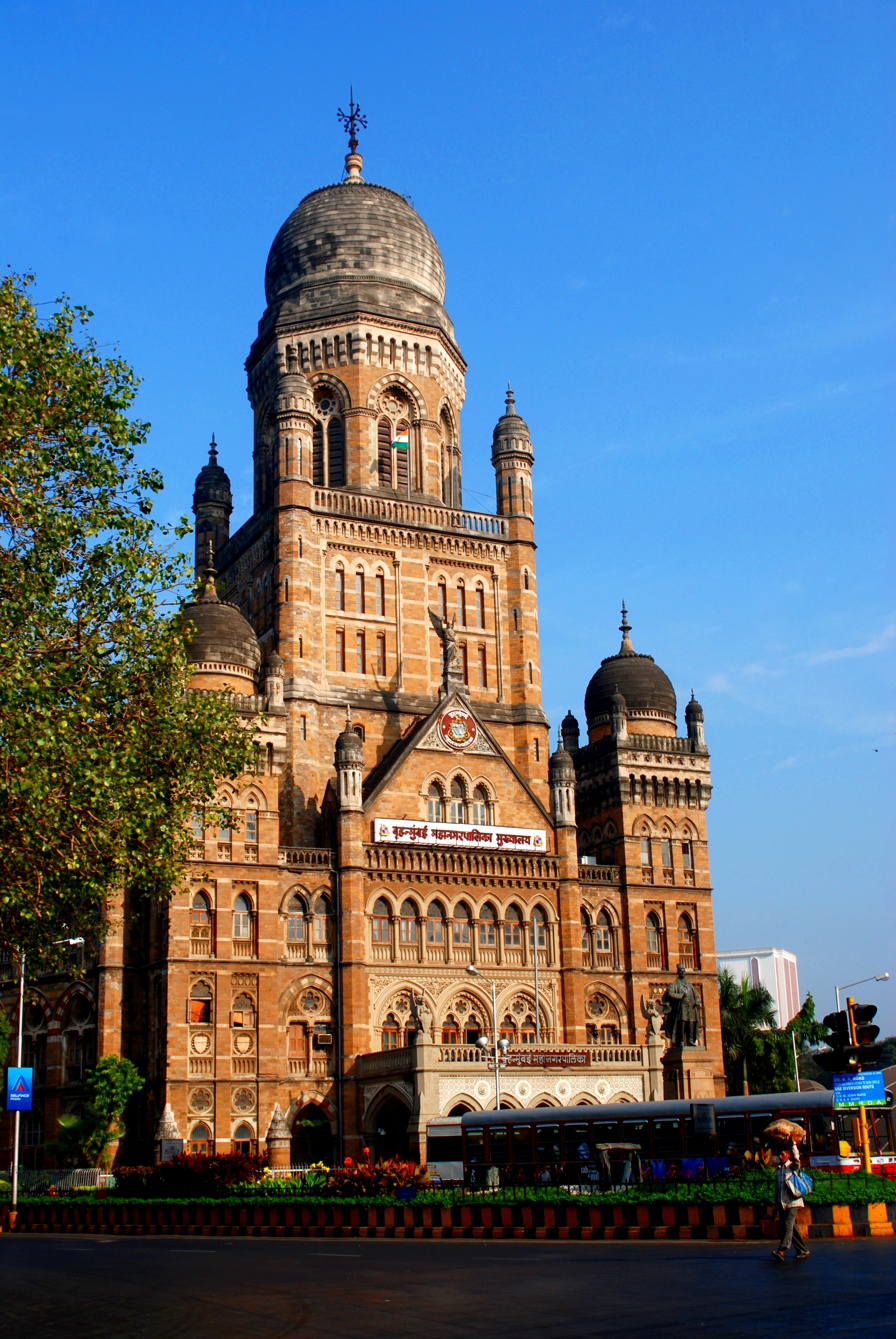
- Municipal Corporation Building, Mumbai

Website
- Brihanmumbai Municipal Corporation

The Brihanmumbai Municipal Corporation (BMC) is the governing civic body of Mumbai, the capital city of Maharashtra.

More well funded than any other municipal corporation in India, its annual budget exceeds that of some of the country's smaller states. Established by the legislature of British India under the Bombay Municipal Corporation Act 1888, the BMC is responsible for the civic infrastructure and administration of the city and some suburbs.

== History ==
The Municipal administration in the erstwhile Bombay existed since 1805. During this period the civic administration was vested in a Court of Petty Sessions. Up to the end of 18th century the administration of Bombay was conducted by the President and Council directly. However, since the Municipal administration had been inefficient, multiple efforts were undertaken by the British administration. The first major change came through in the year 1865 with a Municipal Corporation being established as a Body Corporate and Sir Arthur Crawford was appointed as the first Municipal Commissioner.

Thereafter in 1872, after enactment of the Bombay Act No. III of 1872, a regular Corporation was established consisting of 64 elected Corporators who were the rate (tax) payers with the right to vote being restricted to the tax payers only. Sir Pherozeshah Mehta was instrumental in the drafting of the 1872 Act which led to the establishment of the Corporation as seen today. Sir Pherozeshah served as a Municipal Commissioner in 1873 and served as Chairman in 1884–86, and President in 1905 and 1911. Fondly called as the Father of Municipal Government in Bombay, a large statue of Sir Pherozeshah was erected in 1923 in his memory and respect and adorns the Municipal Corporation Building.

The Imperial Legislative Council passed the Bombay Municipal Corporation Act 1888, which streamlined the operations of the Corporation by way of better administration and by vesting proper responsibilities in its representatives. The Act, with some amendments, remains in force.

== Administration ==
The BMC is headed by an IAS officer who serves as Municipal Commissioner, wielding executive power. The Municipal Commissioner is one of the authorities under the 1888 Act. The Municipal Commissioner is head of Executive Wing under section 54 of the Act, appointed by the Government of Maharashtra. The Municipal Commissioner is responsible for developing & maintaining civic infrastructure of the city like water supply, roads, storm water, drainage and efficient delivery of various services to the citizens of Mumbai. The Municipal Commissioner deputes various departments to the Additional Municipal Commissioners, Deputy Municipal Commissioners, Assistant Commissioners and various heads of Department in discharge of his functions. The Municipal Commissioner is assisted by Additional Municipal Commissioners, Deputy Municipal Commissioners and Assistant Commissioners.

As of June 2008, all administrative business in the BMC was conducted in Marathi, a decision that sparked controversy, following which the BMC eased its stance and began accepting forms in English.

City officials
Mayor	Ritu Tawde	7 February 2026
Deputy Mayor	Sanjay Ghadi	7 February 2026
Municipal Commissioner	Ashwini Bhide	31 March 2026
Administrator	Bhushan Gagrani, IAS	21 March 2024

== Legislature ==
In order to make the administration of the city convenient, it has been divided into seven zones. Further, these seven zones have 3 to 5 wards each. In total, Mumbai has been divided into 24 administrative wards that are ordered alphabetically from Ward A to Ward T. The 24 administrative wards are further divided into 227 civic electoral wards or constituencies. The smallest of the 24 administrative wards is the B-Ward with only 3 electoral wards while the P North-Ward is the largest with 16 electoral wards.

Every electoral ward is led by a Corporator. The Corporator is the in-charge of the electoral ward and is responsible towards its development in general.

As is the case with Legislative Bodies, the Elections for electing the Corporators is held every 5 years. The previous elections were held in 2026. Harshad Karkar from Shiv-Sena was the youngest candidate at age 23 to win the Elections in 2017.

The Corporators among themselves are to elect a Mayor who is the First Citizen of Mumbai. Mayors have two distinct roles- the decorative role of representing and upholding the dignity of the city and the functional role of presiding over the deliberations of the Corporation. As the presiding authority at the Corporation Meetings, his/her role is confined to the four corners of the Corporation Hall. The decorative role, however, extends far beyond the city and the country to other parts of world. This is seen whenever a foreign dignitary or a V.V.I.P. visits the city and the State Government invites the Mayor to receive the honoured guest on behalf of the Citizens. Thus, when the Mayor receives or sees the guest off, he does it on behalf of all the citizens of Mumbai. Similarly, when the Mayor accords a civic reception or presents a civic address to a Monarch, or a President or a Prime Minister of any country, he does so in the name of the Mumbai Municipal Corporation and the citizens of Mumbai. In such situations, the Mayor is seen as the First Citizen. Mayor is also given a place of prominence at Civic, Government and other social functions. The term of the office of the Mayor is 2.5 years.

== Current members ==
The 227 wards of the Brihanmumbai Municipal Corporation and their councillors are listed below in the serial wise order. The last elections were held on 15 January 2026 with their results being declared on 16 January 2026.

Mayor: Ritu Tawde
Deputy Mayor: Sanjay Ghadi
Area	Ward No.	Councillor	Party	Remarks
R–North	1	Rekha Yadav	Shiv Sena	
R–North	2	Tejasvee Ghosalkar	Bharatiya Janata Party	
R–North	3	Prakash Darekar	Bharatiya Janata Party	
R–North	4	Mangesh Pangare	Shiv Sena	
R–North	5	Sanjay Ghadi	Shiv Sena	Deputy Mayor
R–North	6	Diksha Karkar	Shiv Sena	
R–North	7	Ganesh Khankar	Bharatiya Janata Party	
R–North	8	Yogita Patil	Bharatiya Janata Party	
R–Central	9	Shivanand Shetty	Bharatiya Janata Party	
R–Central	10	Jitendra Patel	Bharatiya Janata Party	
R–Central	11	Aditi Khursange	Shiv Sena	
R–Central	12	Sarika Jhore	Shiv Sena (UBT)	
R–Central	13	Rani Trivedi	Bharatiya Janata Party	
R–Central	14	Seema Shinde	Bharatiya Janata Party	
R–Central	15	Jignasa Shah	Bharatiya Janata Party	
R–Central	16	Shweta Korgaonkar	Bharatiya Janata Party	
R–Central	17	Shilpa Sangore	Bharatiya Janata Party	
R–Central	18	Sandhya Doshi	Shiv Sena	
R–South	19	Dakshata Kavthankar	Bharatiya Janata Party	
R–South	20	Deepak Tawde	Bharatiya Janata Party	
R–South	21	Leena Deherkar	Bharatiya Janata Party	
R–South	22	Himanshu Parekh	Bharatiya Janata Party	
R–South	23	Shiv Kumar Jha	Bharatiya Janata Party	
R–South	24	Swati Jaiswal	Bharatiya Janata Party	
R–South	25	Nisha Parulekar	Bharatiya Janata Party	
R–South	26	Dharmendra Kale	Shiv Sena (UBT)	
R–South	27	Neelam Gurav	Bharatiya Janata Party	
R–South	28	Ajanta Yadav	Indian National Congress	
R–South	29	Sachin Patil	Shiv Sena (UBT)	
R–South	30	Dhaval Vora	Bharatiya Janata Party	
R–South	31	Manisha Yadav	Bharatiya Janata Party	
P–North	32	Geeta Bhandari	Shiv Sena (UBT)	
P–North	33	Mohammad Moeen Siddique	Indian National Congress	
P–North	34	Hyder Aslam Shaikh	Indian National Congress	
P–North	35	Yogesh Verma	Bharatiya Janata Party	
P–North	36	Siddharth Sharma	Bharatiya Janata Party	
P–North	37	Yogita Prashant	Shiv Sena (UBT)	
P–North	38	Surekha Parab	Maharashtra Navnirman Sena	
P–North	39	Pushpa Kalambe	Shiv Sena (UBT)	
P–North	40	Tulsiram Shinde	Shiv Sena (UBT)	
P–North	41	Suhas Wadkar	Shiv Sena (UBT)	
P–North	42	Dhanashree Bharadkar	Shiv Sena	
P–North	43	Ajit Raorane	Nationalist Congress Party – Sharadchandra Pawar	
P–North	44	Sangeeta Sharma	Bharatiya Janata Party	
P–North	45	Sanjay Kamble	Bharatiya Janata Party	
P–North	46	Yogita Koli	Bharatiya Janata Party	
P–North	47	Tajinder Singh Tiwana	Bharatiya Janata Party	
P–North	48	Rafiq Eliyas Shaikh	Indian National Congress	
P–North	49	Sangeeta Koli	Indian National Congress	
P–South	50	Vikram Rajput	Bharatiya Janata Party	
P–South	51	Varsha Tembhavkar	Shiv Sena	
P–South	52	Preeti Satam	Bharatiya Janata Party	
P–South	53	Jitendra Valvi	Shiv Sena (UBT)	
P–South	54	Ankit Prabhu	Shiv Sena (UBT)	
P–South	55	Harsh Patel	Bharatiya Janata Party	
P–South	56	Lakshmi Bhatia	Shiv Sena	
P–South	57	Shrikala Pillay	Bharatiya Janata Party	
P–South	58	Sandeep Patel	Bharatiya Janata Party	
K–West	59	Shailesh Phanse	Shiv Sena (UBT)	
K–West	60	Sayali Kulkarni	Bharatiya Janata Party	
K–West	61	Divya Avaneesh Singh	Indian National Congress	
K–West	62	Zeeshan Changez Multani	Shiv Sena (UBT)	
K–West	63	Rupesh Savarkar	Bharatiya Janata Party	
K–West	64	Saba Harun Khan	Shiv Sena (UBT)	
K–West	65	Vitthal Banderi	Bharatiya Janata Party	
K–West	66	Meher Mohsin Haider	Indian National Congress	
K–West	67	Deepak Kotekar	Bharatiya Janata Party	
K–West	68	Rohan Rathod	Bharatiya Janata Party	
K–West	69	Sudha Singh	Bharatiya Janata Party	
K–West	70	Aneesh Makwaneey	Bharatiya Janata Party	
K–West	71	Sunita Mehta	Bharatiya Janata Party	
K–East	72	Mamata Yadav	Bharatiya Janata Party	
K–East	73	Lona Rawat	Shiv Sena (UBT)	
K–East	74	Vidya Arya Kangane	Maharashtra Navnirman Sena	
K–East	75	Pramod Sawant	Shiv Sena (UBT)	
K–East	76	Prakash Musale	Bharatiya Janata Party	
K–East	77	Shivani Parab	Shiv Sena (UBT)	
K–East	78	Nazia Safi	Shiv Sena	
K–East	79	Mansi Madhukar	Shiv Sena (UBT)	
K–East	80	Disha Yadav	Bharatiya Janata Party	
K–East	81	Kesharben Patel	Bharatiya Janata Party	
K–East	82	Jagdeshwari Amin	Bharatiya Janata Party	
K–East	83	Sonali Sabe	Shiv Sena (UBT)	
K–East	84	Anjali Samant	Bharatiya Janata Party	
K–East	85	Milind Shinde	Bharatiya Janata Party	
K–East	86	Ritesh Rai	Shiv Sena	
H–East	87	Pooja Mahadeshwar	Shiv Sena (UBT)	
H–East	88	Sharvari Parab	Shiv Sena (UBT)	
H–East	89	Gitesh Raut	Shiv Sena (UBT)	
H–East	90	Tulip Miranda	Indian National Congress	
H–East	91	Sagun Naik	Shiv Sena	
H–East	92	Ibrahim Iqbal Qureshi	Indian National Congress	
H–East	93	Rohini Kamble	Shiv Sena (UBT)	
H–East	94	Pragya Bhutkar	Shiv Sena (UBT)	
H–East	95	Hari Shastri	Shiv Sena (UBT)	
H–East	96	Ayesha Khan Shams	Nationalist Congress Party	
H–West	97	Hetal Gala	Bharatiya Janata Party	
H–West	98	Alka Kerkar	Bharatiya Janata Party	
H–West	99	Chintamani Nivate	Shiv Sena (UBT)	
H–West	100	Swapna Mhatre	Bharatiya Janata Party	
H–West	101	Karen Demello	Indian National Congress	
H–West	102	Raja Siraj Khan	Indian National Congress	
T	103	Hetal Markvekar	Bharatiya Janata Party	
T	104	Prakash Gangadhar	Bharatiya Janata Party	
T	105	Anita Vaiti	Bharatiya Janata Party	
T	106	Prabhakar Shinde	Bharatiya Janata Party	
T	107	Neil Somaiya	Bharatiya Janata Party	
T	108	Deepika Ghag	Bharatiya Janata Party	
S	109	Suresh Shinde	Shiv Sena (UBT)	
S	110	Asha Suresh Koparkar	Indian National Congress	
S	111	Deepak Sawant	Shiv Sena (UBT)	
S	112	Sakshi Dalvi	Bharatiya Janata Party	
S	113	Deepmala Baban	Shiv Sena (UBT)	
S	114	Rajul Patil	Shiv Sena (UBT)	
S	115	Jyoti Rajbhoj	Maharashtra Navnirman Sena	
S	116	Jagruti Patil	Bharatiya Janata Party	
S	117	Shweta Pawaskar	Shiv Sena (UBT)	
S	118	Sunita Jadhav	Shiv Sena (UBT)	
S	119	Rajesh Sonawane	Shiv Sena	
S	120	Vishwas Shinde	Shiv Sena (UBT)	
S	121	Priyadarshini Thackeray	Shiv Sena (UBT)	
S	122	Chandan Sharma	Bharatiya Janata Party	
N	123	Sunil More	Shiv Sena (UBT)	
N	124	Sakina Sheikh	Shiv Sena (UBT)	
N	125	Suresh Awale	Shiv Sena	
N	126	Archana Bhalerao	Bharatiya Janata Party	
N	127	Swaroopa Patil	Shiv Sena (UBT)	
N	128	Sai Shirke	Maharashtra Navnirman Sena	
N	129	Ashwini Mate	Bharatiya Janata Party	
N	130	Dharmesh Giri	Bharatiya Janata Party	
N	131	Rakhi Jadhav	Bharatiya Janata Party	
N	132	Ritu Tawde	Bharatiya Janata Party	Mayor
N	133	Shrutika Kande	Shiv Sena	
M–East	134	Ateeq Ahmad Khan	All India Majlis-e-Ittehadul Muslimeen	
M–East	135	Navnath Ban	Bharatiya Janata Party	
M–East	136	Mohammad Jamir Qureshi	All India Majlis-e-Ittehadul Muslimeen	
M–East	137	Vacant	All India Majlis-e-Ittehadul Muslimeen	
M–East	138	Vacant	All India Majlis-e-Ittehadul Muslimeen	
M–East	139	Shabana Atif Shaikh	All India Majlis-e-Ittehadul Muslimeen	
M–East	140	Vijay Ubale	All India Majlis-e-Ittehadul Muslimeen	
M–East	141	Vitthal Lokre	Shiv Sena (UBT)	
M–East	142	Apeksha Khandekar	Shiv Sena	
M–East	143	Shabana Farooq Kazi	All India Majlis-e-Ittehadul Muslimeen	
M–East	144	Dinesh Bablu Panchal	Bharatiya Janata Party	
M–East	145	Khairnusa Akbar Hussain	All India Majlis-e-Ittehadul Muslimeen	
M–East	146	Samruddhi Kate	Shiv Sena	
M–East	147	Pragya Sadafule	Shiv Sena	
M–East	148	Anjali Naik	Shiv Sena	
M–West	149	Susham Sawant	Bharatiya Janata Party	
M–West	150	Vaishali Shedkar	Indian National Congress	
M–West	151	Kashish Fulwaria	Bharatiya Janata Party	
M–West	152	Asha Marathe	Bharatiya Janata Party	
M–West	153	Meenakshi Patankar	Shiv Sena (UBT)	
M–West	154	Mahadev Shigwan	Bharatiya Janata Party	
M–West	155	Snehal Shivkar	Shiv Sena (UBT)	
L	156	Ashwini Matekar	Shiv Sena	
L	157	Sarita Mhaske	Shiv Sena (UBT)	
L	158	Chitra Sangle	Shiv Sena (UBT)	
L	159	Prakash More	Bharatiya Janata Party	
L	160	Kiran Landge	Shiv Sena	
L	161	Vijayendra Shinde	Shiv Sena	
L	162	Amir Naseem Khan	Indian National Congress	
L	163	Shaila Lande	Shiv Sena	
L	164	Harish Bhandirge	Bharatiya Janata Party	
L	165	Mohammad Ashraf Azmi	Indian National Congress	
L	166	Meenal Sanjay Turde	Shiv Sena	
L	167	Saman Arshad Azmi	Indian National Congress	
L	168	Sayeeda Khan	Nationalist Congress Party	
L	169	Pravina Morajkar	Shiv Sena (UBT)	
L	170	Bushra Malik	Nationalist Congress Party	
L	171	Rani Yerunkar	Shiv Sena (UBT)	
F–North	172	Rajshree Shirodkar	Bharatiya Janata Party	
F–North	173	Shilpa Keluskar	Bharatiya Janata Party	
F–North	174	Sakshi Kanojia	Bharatiya Janata Party	
F–North	175	Mansi Satamkar	Shiv Sena	
F–North	176	Rekha Yadav	Bharatiya Janata Party	
F–North	177	Kalpesha Kothari	Bharatiya Janata Party	
F–North	178	Amey Ghole	Shiv Sena	
F–North	179	Ayesha Bano	Indian National Congress	
F–North	180	Trushna Vishwasrao	Shiv Sena	
F–North	181	Pushpa Koli	Shiv Sena (UBT)	
G–North	182	Milind Vaidya	Shiv Sena (UBT)	
G–North	183	Asha Deepak Kale	Indian National Congress	
G–North	184	Sajida Babbu Khan	Indian National Congress	
G–North	185	T. M. Jagadish	Shiv Sena (UBT)	
G–North	186	Archana Shinde	Shiv Sena (UBT)	
G–North	187	Joseph Koli	Shiv Sena (UBT)	
G–North	188	Bhaskar Shetty	Shiv Sena	
G–North	189	Harshala More	Shiv Sena (UBT)	
G–North	190	Sheetal Gambhir Desai	Bharatiya Janata Party	
G–North	191	Vishakha Raut	Shiv Sena (UBT)	
G–North	192	Yashwant Killedar	Maharashtra Navnirman Sena	
G–South	193	Hemangi Varlikar	Shiv Sena (UBT)	
G–South	194	Nishikant Shinde	Shiv Sena (UBT)	
G–South	195	Vijay Bhange	Shiv Sena (UBT)	
G–South	196	Padmaja Chemburkar	Shiv Sena (UBT)	
G–South	197	Vanita Narvankar	Shiv Sena	
G–South	198	Aboli Khade	Shiv Sena (UBT)	
G–South	199	Kishori Pednekar	Shiv Sena (UBT)	
F–South	200	Urmila Panchal	Shiv Sena (UBT)	
F–South	201	Iram Sajid Siddiqui	Samajwadi Party	
F–South	202	Shraddha Jadhav	Shiv Sena (UBT)	
F–South	203	Shraddha Pednekar	Shiv Sena (UBT)	
F–South	204	Kiran Tawde	Shiv Sena (UBT)	
F–South	205	Supriya Dalvi	Maharashtra Navnirman Sena	
F–South	206	Sachin Padwal	Shiv Sena (UBT)	
E	207	Rohidas Lokhande	Bharatiya Janata Party	
E	208	Ramakant Rahate	Shiv Sena (UBT)	
E	209	Yamini Jadhav	Shiv Sena	
E	210	Sonam Jamsutkar	Shiv Sena (UBT)	
E	211	Waqar Nisar Ahmed	Indian National Congress	
E	212	Abrahani Shehzad	Samajwadi Party	
E	213	Nasima Zayed	Indian National Congress	
D	214	Ajay Patil	Bharatiya Janata Party	
D	215	Santosh Dhole	Bharatiya Janata Party	
D	216	Rajashree Bhatankar	Indian National Congress	
D	217	Gaurang Jhaveri	Bharatiya Janata Party	
D	218	Snehal Tendulkar	Bharatiya Janata Party	
D	219	Sunny Sanap	Bharatiya Janata Party	
C	220	Sampada Mayekar	Shiv Sena (UBT)	
C	221	Akash Purohit	Bharatiya Janata Party	
C	222	Rita Makwana	Bharatiya Janata Party	
B	223	Dyanraj Nikam	Indian National Congress	
B	224	Rukhsana Noorul Amin	Indian National Congress	
A	225	Harshita Narwekar	Bharatiya Janata Party	
A	226	Makarand Narwekar	Bharatiya Janata Party	
A	227	Gauravi Narwekar	Bharatiya Janata Party	

== Finances and Revenue sources ==
BMC is one of the richest municipal corporations in Asia. In ten years, the Corporation allocated ₹2.19 lakh crore for the city, higher than the 10-year budget of some Indian states. The BMC Annual Budget of ₹52,619.07 crores for the year 2023-2024 was the first instance that the budget estimate for the BMC to cross ₹50,000 crores in its history.

== Controversies and criticism ==
The BMC has a history of corruption and incompetence, with several officials charged under Prevention of Corruption Act but never prosecuted.

The BMC has been criticized for corruption and incompetence over filling potholes on several major roads, besides not being able to build pothole free roads. Every year, shoddy work done by BMC has led to potholes appear and cause significant impact to traffic flow. Despite requests by Mumbai Police to tackle the issue, the BMC has repeatedly ignored them, forcing officers to take matters into their own hands. The police officers have been involved in this have received praise, who themselves have criticized the BMC for their lacklustre attitudes.

The BMC has been censured for not providing infrastructure for bicyclists, as well as demolishing existing tracks which were constructed "illegally". Due to insufficient infrastructure, bicyclists face severe safety hazards, as several citizens utilize bicycles for short commutes. Furthermore, the BMC has collaborated with Mumbai Police to collect fines from bicyclists if riders are found pedaling on certain prohibited roads and flyovers within the city limits, which is illegal as bicyclists cannot be penalized under the Motor Vehicles Act.

Several officers of BMC have been involved in demanding bribes from the general public and have also been found to be drinking liquor on duty while misbehaving with the complainants and activists who come to get their issues resolved. Following several complaints, the anti-corruption bureau has been involved in trapping and booking several BMC officials for accepting bribes. The BMC has also faced flak and ire from residents for not taking action against hawkers and illegal encroachments in lieu of bribes collected by middlemen who cut deals with BMC officials on the behalf of these entities, which impacts safety of pedestrians as they are forced to walk on roads.

On 19 July 2017, Malishka Mendonsa, a popular radio jockey of Red FM, released a parody video on YouTube targeting BMC for incompetence in dealing potholed roads. In response to the video, the BMC and Shiv Sena slammed her and sent a notice for defamation with a penalty of Rs 10,000. As a result of the notice, several political parties criticized the BMC and Shiv Sena for intolerance towards criticism, as 2 Shiv Sena corporators sent a notice of Rs. 500 cr (Rs. 5 billion) against the RJ and Red FM. Further, BMC Officials conducted checks at her residence and offices in an attempt to intimidate her. Then mayor Kishori Pednekar also came in crosshairs with the RJ for unfairly targeting the BMC for potholed roads. Malishka made another parody video against the BMC and released it on 17 July 2018, describing the incapability and pathetic conditions of Mumbai's infrastructure in the monsoons.

The BMC has faced ire from citizens as well as media personnel for serving the political elite on several occasions, especially the ruling party Shiv Sena. Following actress Kangana Ranaut's criticism of Uddhav Thackeray and his Government for mishandling the death of Sushant Singh Rajput in September 2020, the BMC demolished a portion of her house on the orders of Shiv Sena leaders; following the demolishion, the Bombay High Court criticized the BMC and ruled in her favour, noting that BMC acted with malice and ordered the BMC to pay compensation to Ranaut.

During the COVID-19 pandemic, the BMC allegedly granted contracts for procuring medical kits to Sujit Patkar, a close aid of Shiv Sena leader Sanjay Raut, which led to investigation that uncovered a big scam. Former mayor Kishori Pednekar was also found to be involved in the scam.

The BMC has faced outrage and widespread condemnation for incompetence and negligence by the public and media during the reconstruction of Gokhale bridge. In February 2024, following completion of the construction, road users who started commuting on the bridge saw that there was a huge gap in linking the bridge to the Barfiwala Flyover - the previous bridge was linked to this flyover. Following criticism and social media reels from the general citizens, the BMC issued a press statement and said that it never intended to connect the two flyovers in its first phase of reconstruction.

On 13 May 2024, a large hoarding in Ghatkopar region collapsed on a fuel station, killing 17 and injuring 74. An investigation revealed that the hoarding was illegal, although it was approved by BMC engineers, which sparked accusations of corruption, bribery and incompetence. A special investigation team was appointed in the aftermath, which detained and charged the owner of the hoarding Bhavesh Bhinde and the BMC officials who approved it.

In April 2025, the BMC faced massive protests from the Jain community, after a 90 year old Digambar Jain temple was allegedly demolished, when prayers were going on. The Bombay High Court intervened and put a stop order against further demolition, and the BMC transferred the ward officer for Vile-Parle, where the temple was located. Allegations of bribery were stated after a restaurant near the temple wanted to expand but was not able to do so due to restrictions.

In February 2026, the BMC was criticized for adding a musical lane on the Coastal Road by using rumble strips. Critics pointed out that the priorities of BMC should have been fixing critical infrastructure, as the city still grappled from potholes across various locations, along with other poor basic necessities, rather than spend resources on such costly beautification projects. The musical lane was also criticized for creating noise disturbance for residents living nearby.

== Revenue ==
=== Revenue from taxes ===
Following is the Tax related revenue for the corporation.

- Property tax.
- Profession tax.
- Entertainment tax.
- Grants from Central and State Government like Goods and Services Tax.
- Advertisement tax.

=== Revenue from non-tax sources ===
Following is the Non Tax related revenue for the corporation.

- Water usage charges.
- Fees from Documentation services.
- Rent received from municipal property.
- Funds from municipal bonds.

== See also ==
- List of urban local bodies in Maharashtra
