= List of municipal commissioners of Mumbai =

The Municipal Commissioner of Mumbai is the chief executive officer of the Brihanmumbai Municipal Corporation. Though the Mayor is the head of the house, his role is largely ceremonial and almost all powers are vested in the Commissioner. The Municipal Commissioner maintains Mumbai, and thus has responsibilities over the sewage system, the school divisions, power companies, roads, and other aspects of local infrastructure. The BEST and the Mumbai Fire Brigade are autonomous bodies under the organization. The commissioner is an Indian Administrative Service officer appointed by the Maharashtra state government. Bhushan Gagrani, IAS, is the current Municipal Commissioner of Mumbai.

== List of commissioners ==
The List of Municipal Commissioners of the Brihanmumbai Municipal Corporation since 1946 are as under:

Sr No	Name	Tenure
1	B.K. Patel	February 1946 to September 1952
2	P.R. Nayak	September 1952 to January 1957
3	V.L. Gidhwani	July 1954 to August 1954 (Interim) July 1957 to April 1960
4	M.G. Pimputkar	April 1960 to February 1962
5	A.U. Sheikh	February 1962 to April 1963
6	S. A, Sukhtankar	April 1963 to April 1966
7	J.H. Patwardhan	April 1966 to April 1969
8	J.B. D'Souza	May 1969 to March 1970
9	M.N. Desai	May 1970 to April 1972
10	M.V. Desai	April 1972 to August 1975
11	B.G. Deshmukh	August 1975 to May 1978
12	B.K. Chaugule	May 1978 to May 1981
13	D.M. Sukhtankar	May 1981 to November 1984
14	Jamshed G. Kanga	November 1984 to July 1986
15	Sadashiv Tinaikar	July 1986 to April 1990
16	P. Padmanabhaiyya	May 1990 to November 1991
17	Sharad G. Kale	November 1991 to May 1995
18	J.D. Jadhav-PS	May 1995 to June 1996
19	Girish Gokhale	June 1996 to May 1999
20	K. Nalinakshan	June 1999 to May 2000
21	V. Rangnathan	June 2000 - January 2001
22	Karun Srivastava	January 2001 - March 2004
23	Johny Joseph	March 2004 - April 2007
24	Jairaj Phatak	May 2007 - October 2009
25	Swadhin Kshatriya	December 2009 -January 2011
26	Subodh Kumar	January 2011 - May 2012
27	Sitaram Kunte	May 2012 - April 2015
28	Ajoy Mehta	May 2015 - May 2019
29	Praveen Pardeshi	May 2019 - May 2020
30	Iqbal Singh Chahal	8 May 2020 – 21 March 2024
31	Bhushan Gagrani	21 March 2024 - 30 March 2026
32	Ashwini Bhide	31 March 2026 - Present

== See also ==
- Municipal Corporation of Greater Mumbai(MCGM) or Brihanmumbai Municipal Corporation (BMC)
- Municipal Corporation Building, Mumbai (for details on the buildings architecture)
- Coat of arms of Mumbai
- Administrative divisions of Mumbai
- Mayor of Mumbai
- Sheriff of Mumbai
