= List of chief secretaries of Manipur =

Chief Secretary of Manipur of Government of Manipur
- Flag of India
- Incumbent; Rajeev Singh Thakur since 1 September 2026
- Reports to: Governor & Chief Minister Manipur
- Appointer: Chief Minister of Manipur

The Chief Secretary of Manipur is the top-most executive official and senior-most civil servant of Manipur. The Chief Secretary is the ex-officio head of the state Civil Services Board, the State Secretariat, the state cadre Indian Administrative Service and all civil services under the rules of business of the state government. The Chief Secretary acts as the principal advisor to the chief minister on all matters of state administration.

The Chief Secretary is the officer of Indian Administrative Service. The Chief Secretary is the senior-most cadre post in the state administration, ranking 23rd on the Indian order of precedence. The Chief Secretary acts as an ex-officio secretary to the state cabinet, therefore called "Secretary to the Cabinet". The status of this post is equal to that of a Secretary to the Government of India.

Rajeev Singh Thakur is the current Chief Secretary of the Government of Manipur, appointed on 1 September 2026.

== List of Chief Secretaries ==
Name	Term of office		Ref.
Dwijendra Nath Barua, IAS	1981	1987	
H. Jel Shyam, IAS	1999 (Note: Source notes that he was Chief Secretary in 1999; exact tenure dates are unsourced)		
Rakesh, IAS		30 June 2009	
D.S. Poonia, IAS	1 July 2009	31 July 2013	
PC Lawmkunga, IAS	1 August 2013	30 September 2015	
Oinam Nabakishore, IAS	1 October 2015	6 July 2017	
Rajni Ranjan Rashmi, IAS	7 July 2017	30 March 2018	
J. Suresh Babu, IAS	1 April 2018	31 July 2020	
Rajesh Kumar, IAS	1 August 2020	6 May 2023	
Vineet Joshi, IAS	7 May 2023	25 December 2024	
Prashant Kumar Singh, IAS	11 January 2025	11 July 2025	
Dr. Puneet Kumar Goel, IAS	21 July 2025	31 August 2026	
Rajeev Singh Thakur,IAS	1 September 2026	Incumbent	

== See also ==
- List of chief secretaries of Mizoram
- List of chief secretaries of Assam
- List of chief secretaries of Jharkhand
