= IIT Delhi =

Research institute in Delhi, India

Indian Institute of Technology Delhi
- Type: Public institute of technology
- Established: 1961; 65 years ago
- Endowment: ₹375 crore (2022)
- Budget: ₹904.91 crore (US$94 million) (2025–26)
- Chairperson: Harish Salve
- Director: Rangan Banerjee
- Academic staff: 687
- Students: 12,543
- Undergraduates: 4,971
- Postgraduates: 3,568
- Doctoral students: 4,004
- Location: South Delhi, Delhi, India; 28°32′42″N 77°11′32″E
- Campus: 375 acres (1.52 km^{2}); Urban
- Colours: Red
- Nickname: IITian
- Website: home.iitd.ac.in

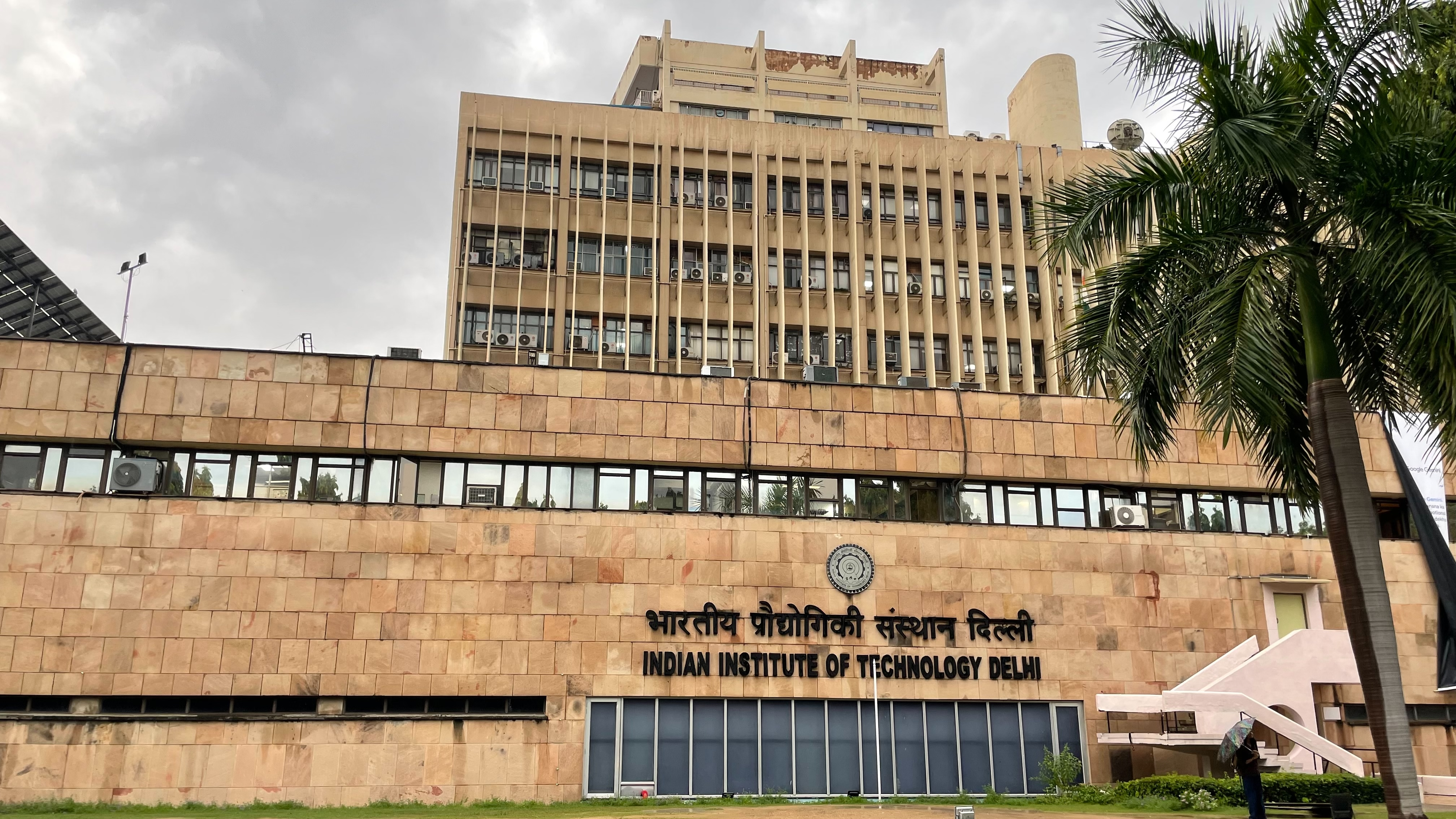
Main building of IIT Delhi

The Indian Institute of Technology Delhi (IIT-Delhi or IIT-D) is a public institute of technology located in Delhi, India. It has its satellite campus in Sonipat, Haryana, and the international campus in Abu Dhabi, UAE. It is one of the 23 Indian Institutes of Technology created to be a Centre of Excellence for India's training, research and development in science, engineering and technology. It was declared an Institution of Eminence in 2018. IIT Delhi is widely renowned as one of India's leading engineering and technology institutes.

Established in 1961, it was formally inaugurated in August 1961 by Humayun Kabir, Minister of Scientific Research & Cultural Affairs. The first admissions were made in 1961. The current campus has an area of 320 acres (or 1.3 km^{2}) and is bound by the Sri Aurobindo Marg on the east, the Jawaharlal Nehru University Complex on the west, the National Council of Educational Research and Training on the south, and the New Ring Road on the north. It is flanked by Qutub Minar and the Hauz Khas monuments.

The institute was later decreed in the Institutes of National Importance under the Institutes of Technology Amendment Act, 1963, and accorded the status of a full University with powers to decide its academic policy, conduct its examinations, and award its degrees.

== History ==
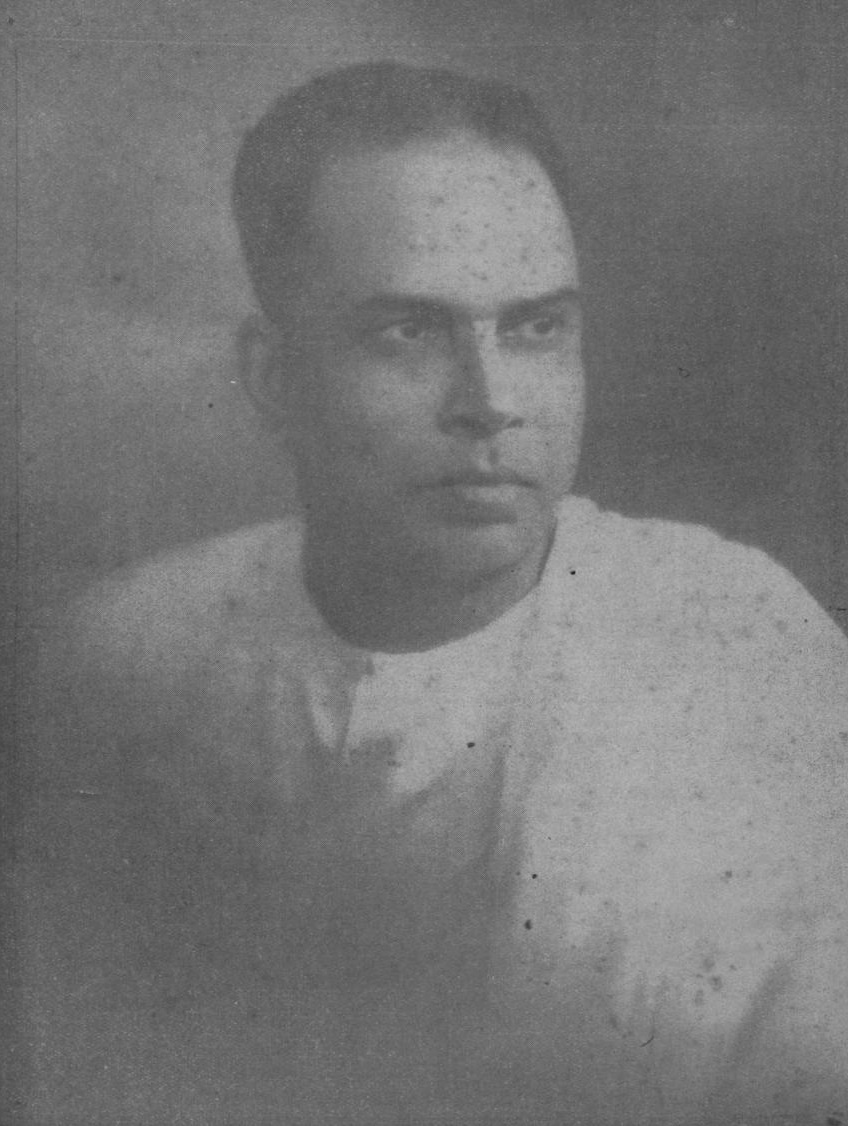
Nalini Ranjan Sarkar, who recommended the set up of IIT's, along the lines of the MIT

The concept of IIT was first introduced by Nalini Ranjan Sarkar, then a Member of Education on the Viceroy's executive council. Following his recommendations, the first Indian Institute of Technology was established in the year 1950 in Kharagpur. In his report, Shri Sircar suggested that such institutes should also be established in different parts of the country. The Government, having accepted these recommendations of the Sircar Committee, decided to establish more Institutes of Technology with the assistance of friendly countries that were prepared to help. The first offer of help came from the USSR, which agreed to collaborate in the establishment of an Institute through UNESCO in Bombay. This was followed by the Institutes of Technology at Madras, Kanpur, and Delhi with collaborations with West Germany, the United States, and UK respectively.

H.R.H. Prince Philip, Duke of Edinburgh laid the foundation stone of the college at Hauz Khas on 28 January 1959 during his visit to India. The first admissions were made in 1961. The College of Engineering & Technology was registered as a society on 14 June 1960 under the Societies Registration Act No. XXI of 1860 (Registration No. S1663 of 1960–61). The students were asked to report to the college on August 16, 1961, and the college was formally inaugurated on August 17, 1961, by Humayun Kabir, Minister of Scientific Research & Cultural Affairs. Initially, the college ran in the Kashmiri Gate campus of Delhi College of Engineering (now known as Delhi Technological University) before shifting to its permanent campus in Hauz Khas. The Department of Textile Technology at Delhi College of Engineering was relocated en bloc to mark the beginning of IIT Delhi at its new Hauz Khas campus. The college was later accorded university status and was renamed the Indian Institute of Technology Delhi. IIT Delhi celebrated its Golden Jubilee in 2011, and its Diamond Jubilee in 2021.

In 2018, IIT Delhi was one of the first six institutes to be awarded the Institute of Eminence status. According to a government statement issued earlier, these IoEs will have greater autonomy, allowing them to admit foreign students up to 30% of the total number of students and recruit foreign faculty up to 25% of the faculty strength, along with enhanced research funding.

In July 2023, IIT Delhi signed a Memorandum of Understanding (MoU) to establish the first global campus of IIT-Delhi in Abu Dhabi, United Arab Emirates.

== Campus ==
=== Main Campus ===
The primary campus of IIT Delhi is located in Hauz Khas, South Delhi, with Sonipat and Jhajjar being the two satellite campuses. The campus of 325 acres (132 ha) is surrounded by the Hauz Khas area and monuments such as the Qutb Minar and Lotus Temple. The campus is also close to other educational institutions such as the Jawaharlal Nehru University, Indian Institute of Foreign Trade, International Management Institute, New Delhi, All India Institute of Medical Sciences, National Institute of Fashion Technology, National Council of Educational Research and Training (NCERT) and Indian Statistical Institute.

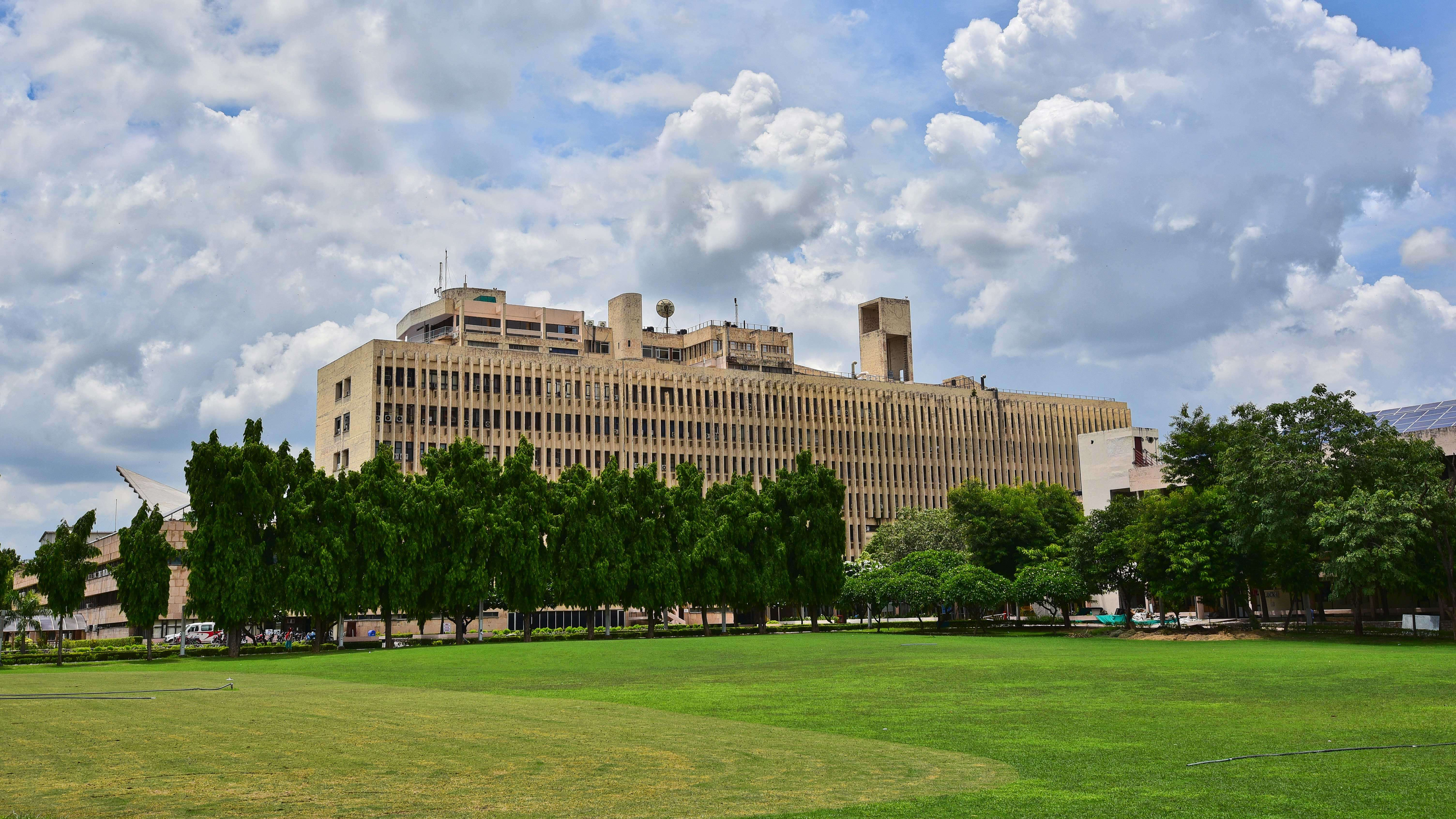
Multi-Storey Building (MS) facing the front lawns

The IIT-D campus is divided into four zones:

- Student Residential Zone
- Faculty and Staff Residential Zone
- Student Recreational Area, which includes the Student Activity Centre (SAC), football stadium, cricket ground, basketball courts, hockey field, lawn tennis courts and swimming pool
- Academic Zone that includes department offices, lecture theatres, the Central Library, and workshops.

The student residential zone comprises 14 student hostels, each named after a mountain range in India. It is divided into two main sectors— one for the 11 boys' hostels and another for the three girls' hostels.

=== Sonipat campus ===
Initially announced in 2012, the new IITD-Sonipat campus was unveiled in April 2018 by the Chief Minister of Haryana at the Technopark at Rajiv Gandhi Education City, Sonipat. The Technopark, of which this campus is part, itself was established at a cost of INR175 crore (1.75 billion). The Campus in Sonipat focuses on Executive and Faculty Development programs for the engineering and technical colleges of Haryana state, as well as design and development of advanced technology, incubate more start-ups and promote industry collaboration.

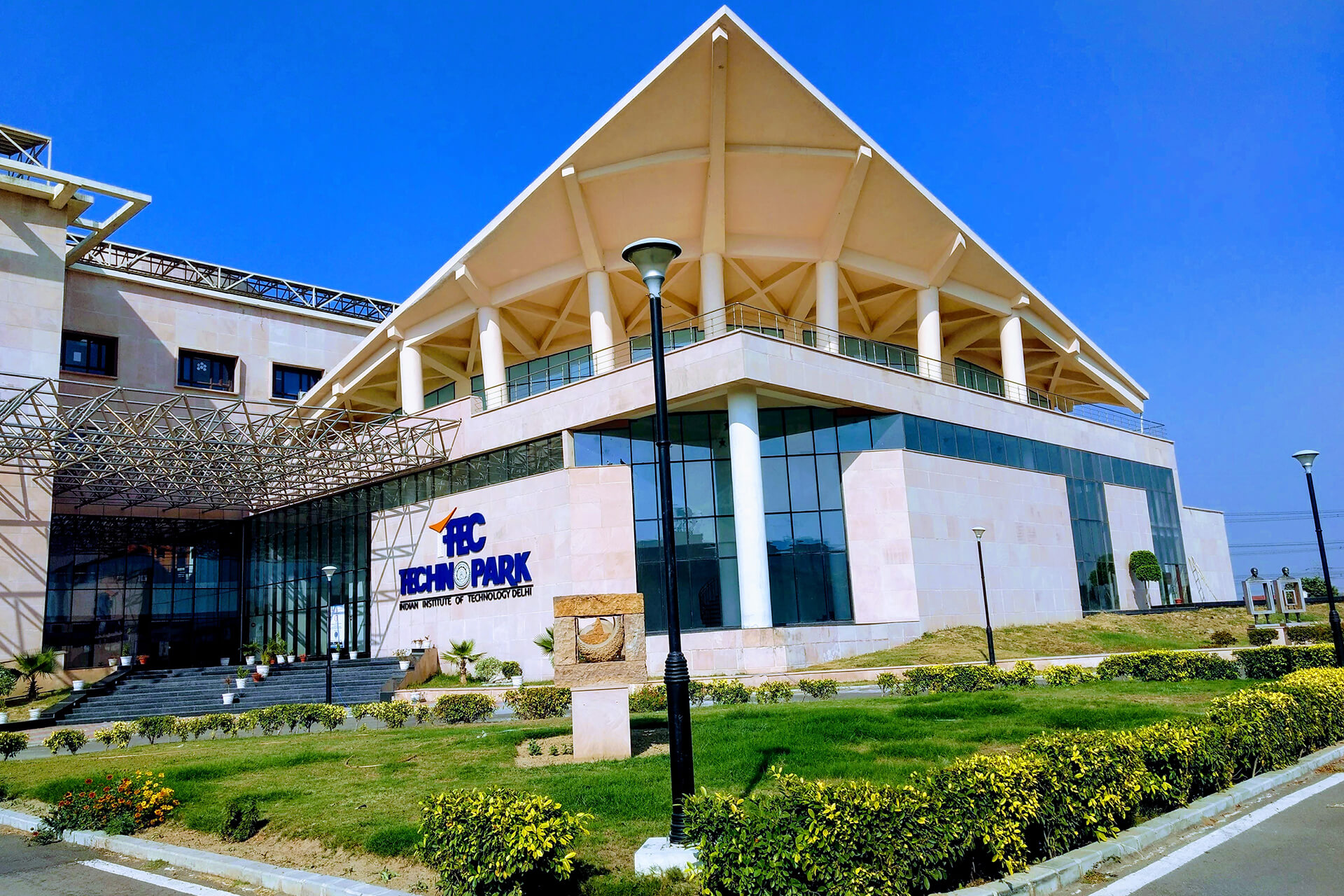
Technology park IIT Delhi at Sonipat campus front view

Facilities include research & development labs set up jointly by corporations with IIT Delhi, business incubators, the Impact Lab for Path —a global health innovation hub, a high-end central research facility, a Centre of Excellence in Smart Manufacturing, training centres, and convention facilities. It can incubate and house 100 startups with residential facilities.

=== Jhajjar campus ===
IITD-Jhajjar campus is located next to the AIIMS-Delhi's Jhajjar campus at Badsa village in Jhajjar district of Haryana. IIT-Delhi and AIIMS are jointly establishing a biomedical research park on this campus, which will include a joint PhD supervision program and provisions for adjunct faculty. IITD-Jhajjar is funded by the IITD and managed by the Foundation for Innovation and Technology Transfer (FITT).

== Organisation and Administration ==
=== Governance ===
All IITs follow the same organisational structure, which has the President of India as a visitor at the top of the hierarchy. Directly under the president is the IIT Council. Under the IIT Council is the board of governors of each IIT. Under the Board of Governors is the Director, the IIT's chief academic and executive officer. Under the director in the organisational structure comes the deputy director. Under the director and the deputy director come the deans, heads of departments, and registrar.

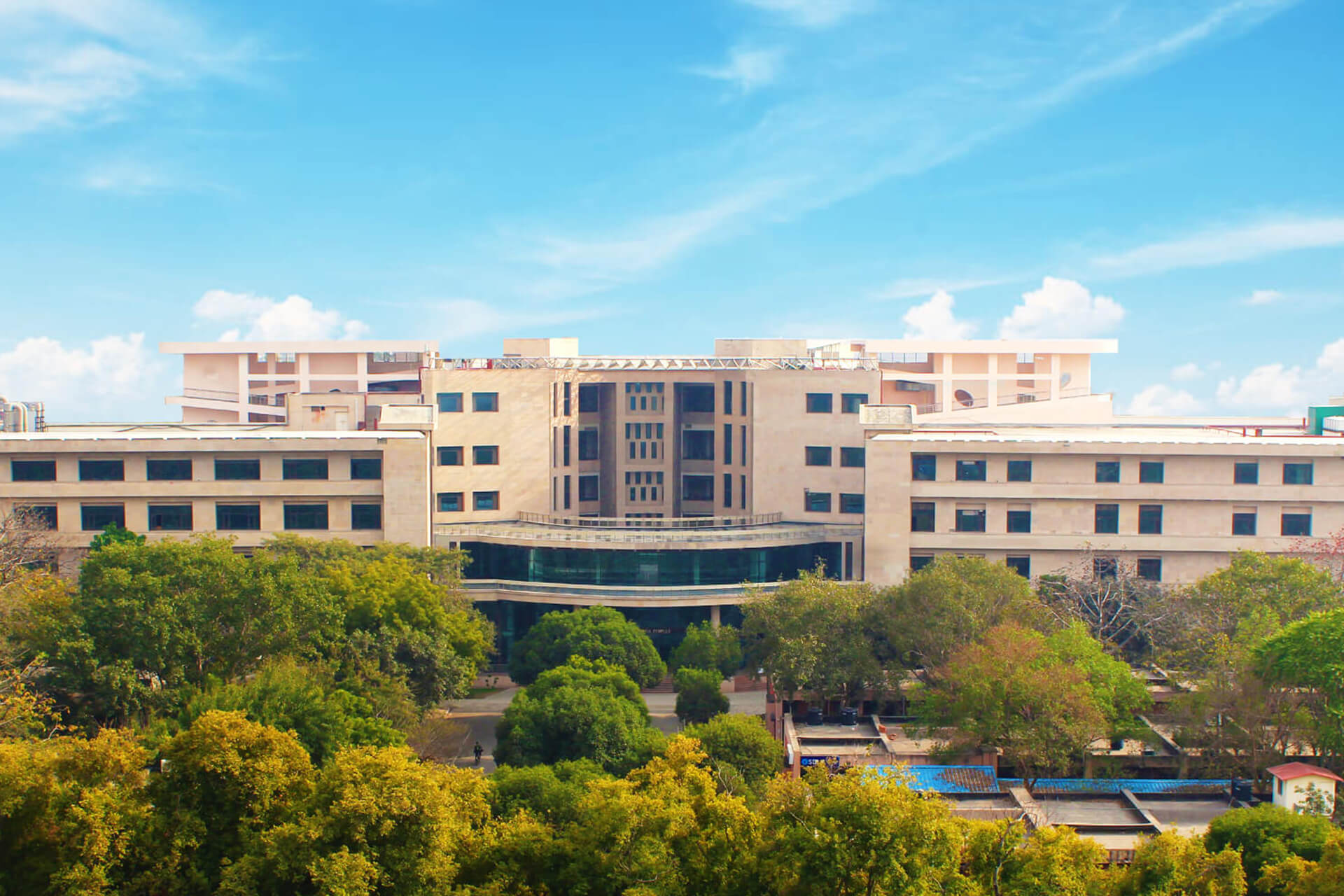
Lecture Hall Complex (LHC) of IIT Delhi

=== Externally funded schools ===
IIT Delhi has four externally funded schools functioning as a part of the institute:

- Bharti School of Telecommunication Technology and Management
- Amar Nath and Shashi Khosla School of Information Technology
- Yardi School of Artificial Intelligence
- Kusuma School of Biological Sciences
- Centre of Excellence in Cyber Systems and Information Assurance
- School of Public Policy
- School of Interdisciplinary Research

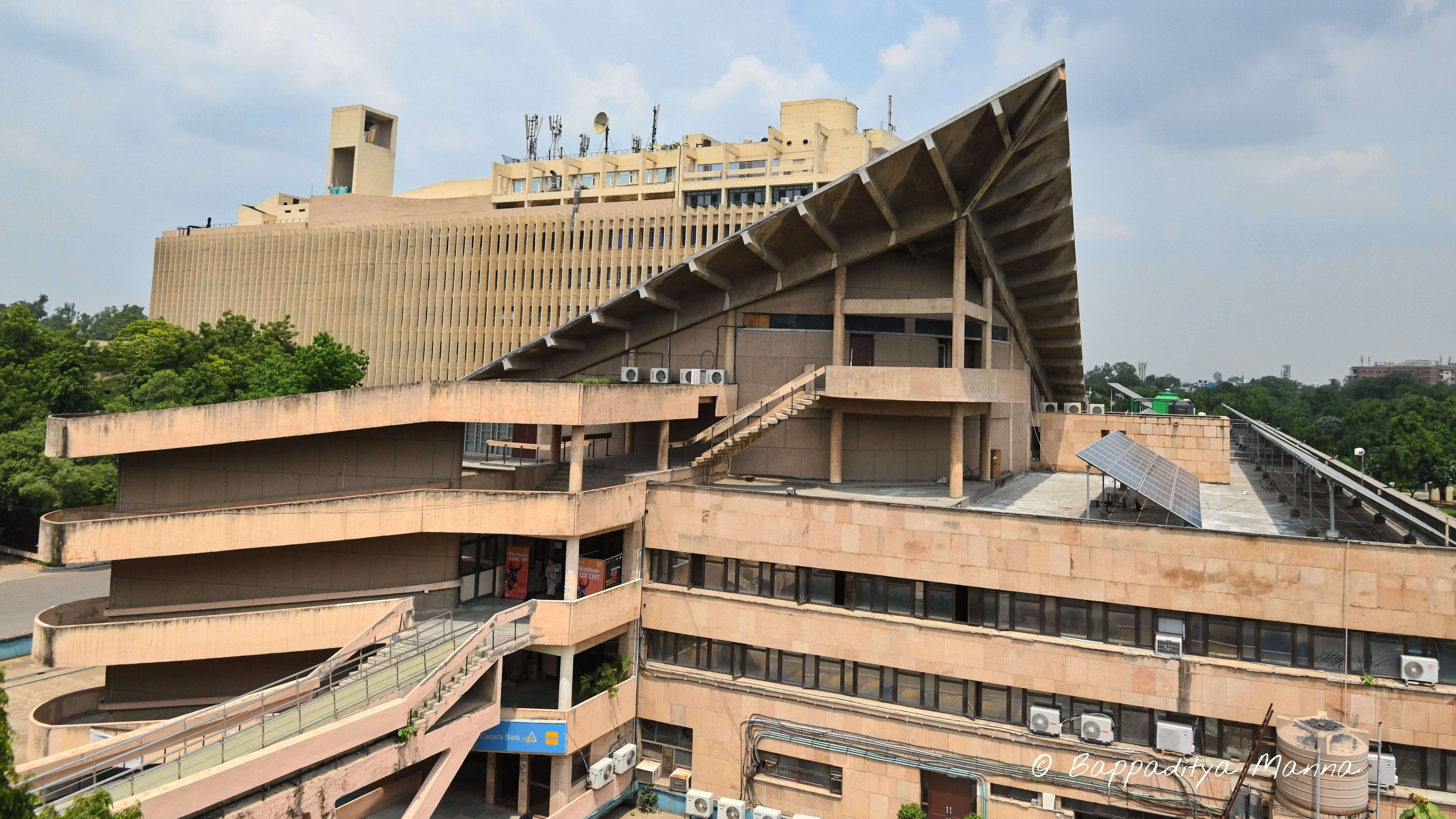
Main building view from the central library

== Academics ==
IIT Delhi offers Bachelor of Technology programs in various fields and a dual degree in B.Tech. - M.Tech. Programs. Admission to these programs is done through Joint Entrance Examination – Advanced.

IIT Delhi also offers postgraduate programs that award an M.Tech. (by coursework), M.S. (by research), M.Sc., M. Des., MBA under various departments and centres. Admission to the M.Tech. program is mainly based on Graduate Aptitude Test in Engineering (GATE). M.Des ( Master of Design ) admissions are through Common Entrance Examination for Design (CEED), M.Sc. admissions are through Joint Admission Test for Masters (JAM) and MBA admissions are through Common Admission Test (CAT).

In March 2018, IIT Delhi formally inaugurated a new Department of Design to enhance research and education in design. The 25-year-old design course was previously functioning under the auspices of the IDDC (Instrument Design and Development Centre). IIT Delhi will be starting the B.Des (Bachelor of Design) program in the academic year 2022–2023.

=== Rankings ===
University and college rankings

General – international
- ARWU (2022): 701–800
- QS (Asia) (2023): 46

General – India
- NIRF (Overall) (2024): 4
- NIRF (Research) (2024): 3

Engineering – India
- NIRF (2024): 2
- India Today (2022): 1
- Government colleges
- Outlook India (2022): 2

Business/Management – India
- NIRF (2024): 4

In the QS World University Rankings 2027, IIT Delhi was ranked 118th in the world and 1st in India. In QS Subject rankings of 2026, under Engineering & Technology, IIT Delhi was ranked 36th in the world.

Internationally, IIT Delhi was ranked 150 in the world by the QS World University Rankings of 2024 and 47 in Asia. It was ranked in the 601–700 band in the Academic Ranking of World Universities ranking in 2023. In 2006, Times Higher Education (THE) ranked all Indian Institutes of Technology as Number 3 in their top 100 best technology universities in the world list.

IIT Delhi was also ranked 3rd in the overall category, 3rd among research institutions, 2nd among engineering colleges and 5th among management schools in India by the National Institutional Ranking Framework (NIRF) in 2023. Outlook India ranked IIT Delhi 2nd among government engineering colleges in 2023. In India Today Best Engineering Colleges 2024, IIT Delhi was ranked 1st.

== Student life ==
=== Cultural and non-academic activities ===
The institute organises its annual cultural fest Rendezvous, originally started in 1976. It is a four-day-long event held in October every year. In the 2019 version, Rendezvous hosted over 280 events, with 15,000+ participants and 200+ artists from more than 25 countries.

Tryst, a technical fest organised by the student community of IIT Delhi, is North India's largest science, technological and management festival. With over 75 events, Tryst attracts nearly 40,000 students across the nation.

On 20 January 2026, retired NASA astronaut & U.S. Navy Captain Sunita Williams visited IIT Delhi, where she delivered the inaugural Prof. V. N. Vazirani Institute Lecture, sharing insights from her career in human spaceflight and her missions aboard the International Space Station.

=== Office of Career Services ===
The Office of Career Services (OCS), previously known as the Training and Placement (T&P) Unit, had the primary aim of helping students to find a job upon graduation. Its role has evolved with OCS focusing on year-round activities to provide career counselling, interview preparation, and talks to expose students to the many available opportunities.

=== Student bodies ===
There are several student bodies at IIT Delhi, each with its own set of responsibilities and unique characteristics. The highest student body at IIT Delhi is the Student Affairs Council (SAC).

==== Student Affairs Council (SAC) ====
The Students' Affairs Council is the apex student body of IIT-Delhi. The primary objective of SAC is to address all issues/problems concerning the students of IIT Delhi. SAC also addresses the administrative decisions related to student affairs and infrastructure-related issues. The grievances and suggestions of the students are directed to the concerned administration for redressal through the SAC framework. SAC consists of the various boards of IIT Delhi and other committees.

==== Board for Student Welfare (BSW) ====
As the name suggests, BSW works to benefit the welfare of all the students of IITD. The BSW shall organise welfare activities from time to time and look into other aspects of student welfare. The BSW shall provide financial aid to needy students in accordance with the established rules. BSW has the responsibility of organising Speranza, the annual youth festival of IIT Delhi.

The board monitors the institute's sports domain. It is responsible for maintaining the sports grounds of different sports, conducting Inter-Hostel sports competitions, and ensuring and managing the participation of IIT Delhi in the Inter-IIT Sports Meet (the annual sports event of all the IITs). Apart from this, BSA is also responsible for conducting Sportech, the annual Sports Festival of IIT Delhi.

The other student council is the Co-curricular and Academic Interaction Council (CAIC)., which deals with the academic and co-curricular activities of the students. There are 45 student representatives to the CAIC: 22 from undergraduate students and 23 from postgraduate students, apart from 2 representatives from each co-curricular body. The co-curricular activities under the CAIC are:

- Robotics Club
- Entrepreneurship Development Cell
- Technocracy (consisting of the Astronomy Club, the Economics Club, the Electronics Club, and Tech Workshops)
- Automobile Club (consisting of Formula SAE, Mini Baja, and HPV)

The CAIC organises the annual technical festival of IIT Delhi, Tryst.

=== Technical organisations ===
==== ACM Student Chapter ====
The Association for Computing Machinery is an educational and scientific society that works with the motto of "Advancing Computing as a Science and Profession". The IIT Delhi Student Chapter of the ACM was established in 2002 to address the needs of the IIT Delhi computing community. The goal of the chapter is to spark students' interest in computer science, beyond what they learn in the coursework. The chapter organises workshops and talks on various subjects by speakers who are well known in their respective areas. These talks give students opportunities to learn about advanced research subjects. Apart from these, some non-technical activities are also organised. The IIT Delhi Chapter won the ACM Student Chapter Excellence Award for its Outstanding Activities during 2009–10. In 2012, the team of Rudradev Basak, Nikhil Garg, and Pradeep Mathias from IIT Delhi achieved India's best rank at the ACM ICPC World Finals, finishing 18th.

==== Technology Business Incubation Unit (TBIU), IIT Delhi ====
The Technology Business Incubator Unit (TBIU) is the incubation cell at IIT Delhi. It has been in active operation at the institute since 2000. The objective of the TBIU is primarily to promote partnerships with new technology entrepreneurs and start-up companies. Every year, startups are selected into the incubation program and provided support to create innovative technology companies.

== Notable alumni ==
- Nitin Agarwal, 31st Director General of the Border Security Force
- Rajesh Aggarwal, Chief Secretary of Maharashtra
- Binny Bansal, co-founder, Flipkart
- Sachin Bansal, co-founder, Flipkart
- Kiran Bedi, first female IPS officer
- Chetan Bhagat, Indian celebrity columnist
- Deepinder Goyal, co-founder, Zomato
- Vinod Khosla, co-founder, Sun Microsystems
- Shrinivas Kulkarni, Indian-American astronomer
- Amit Lodha, Indian author and police officer
- Raghuram Rajan, Indian economist
- Nitin Seth, Indian tech entrepreneur

== Gallery ==
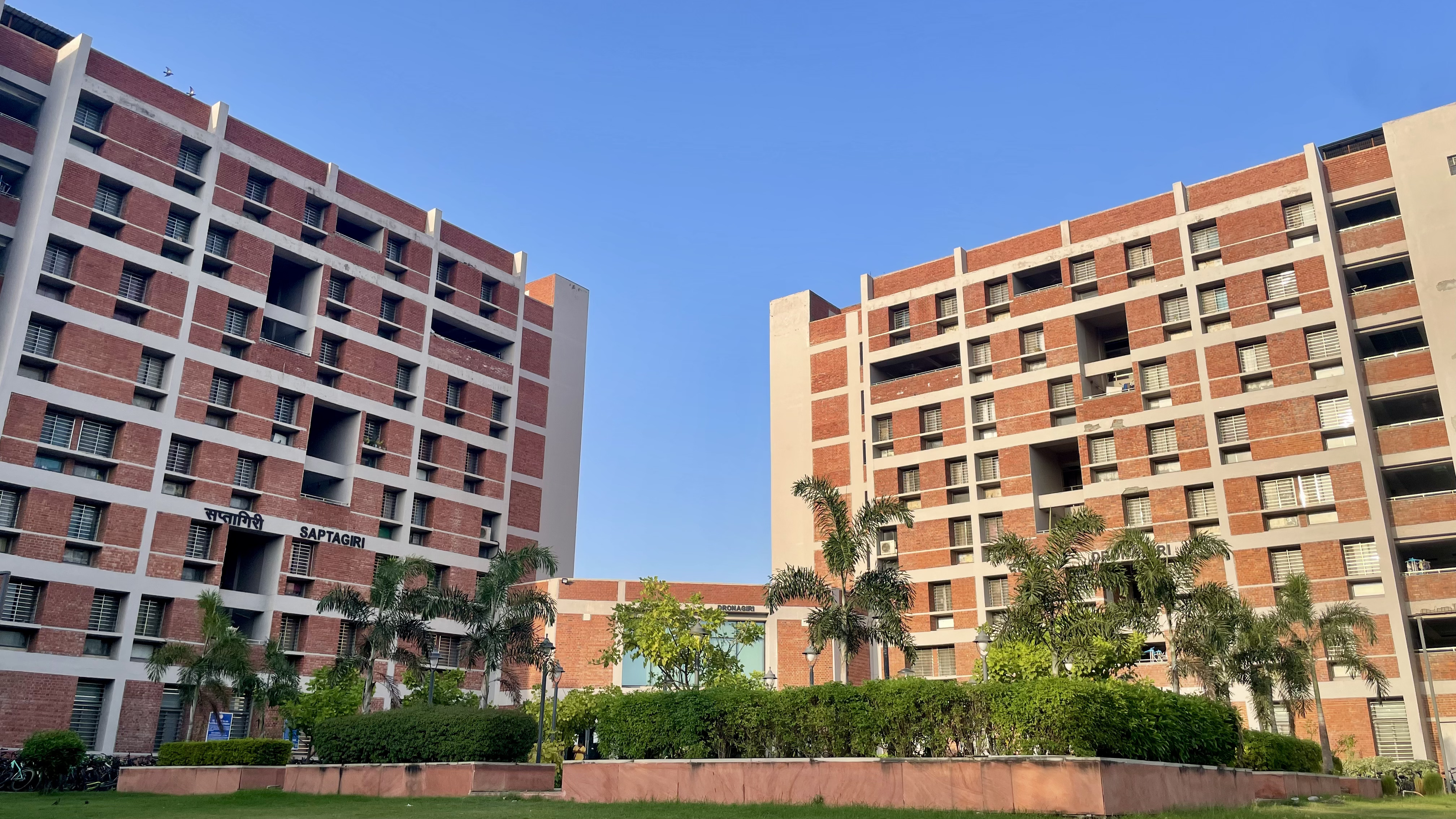
Panoramic view of IITD hostels

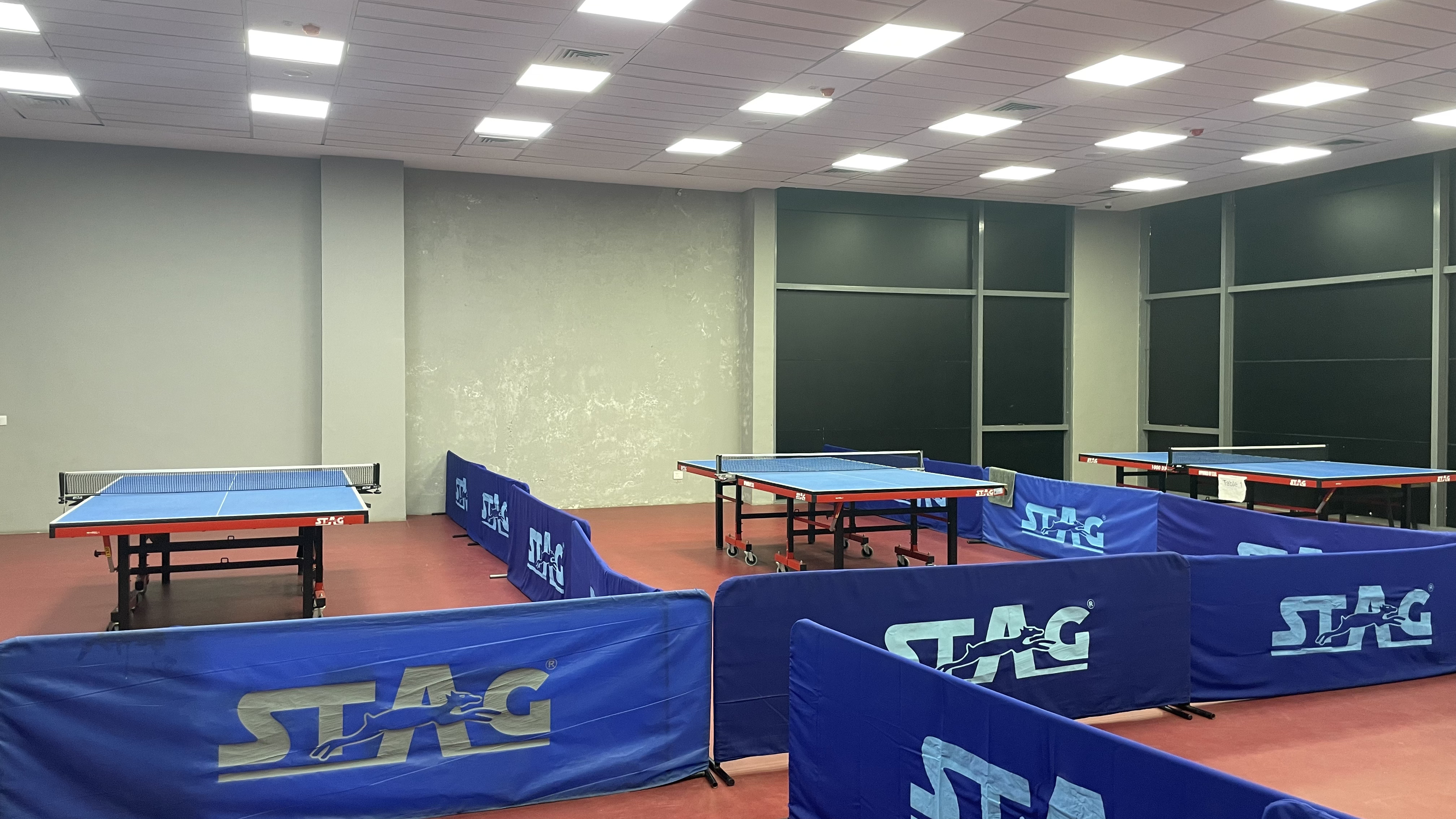
Table tennis playroom in IIT Delhi

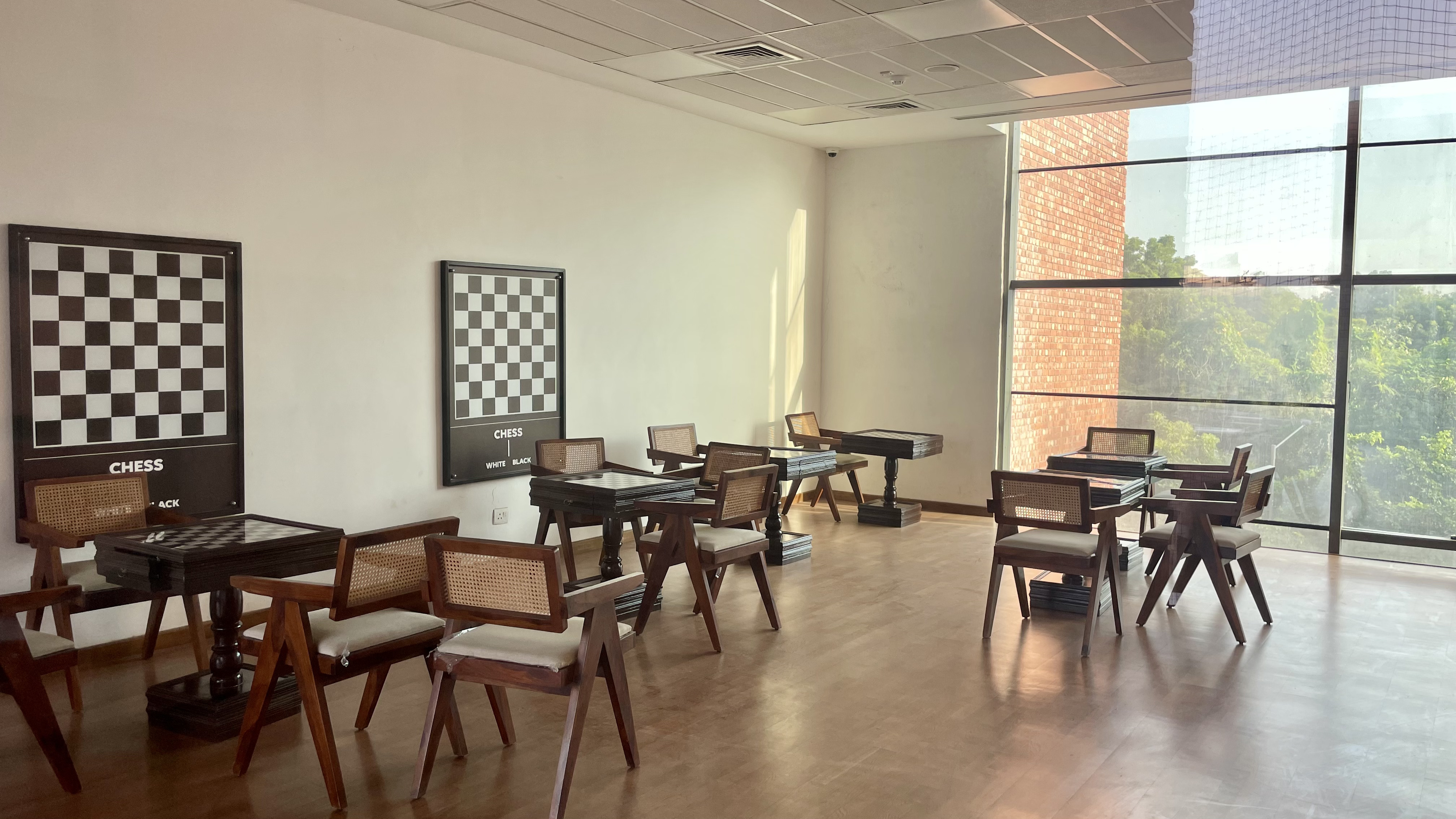
Chess Room

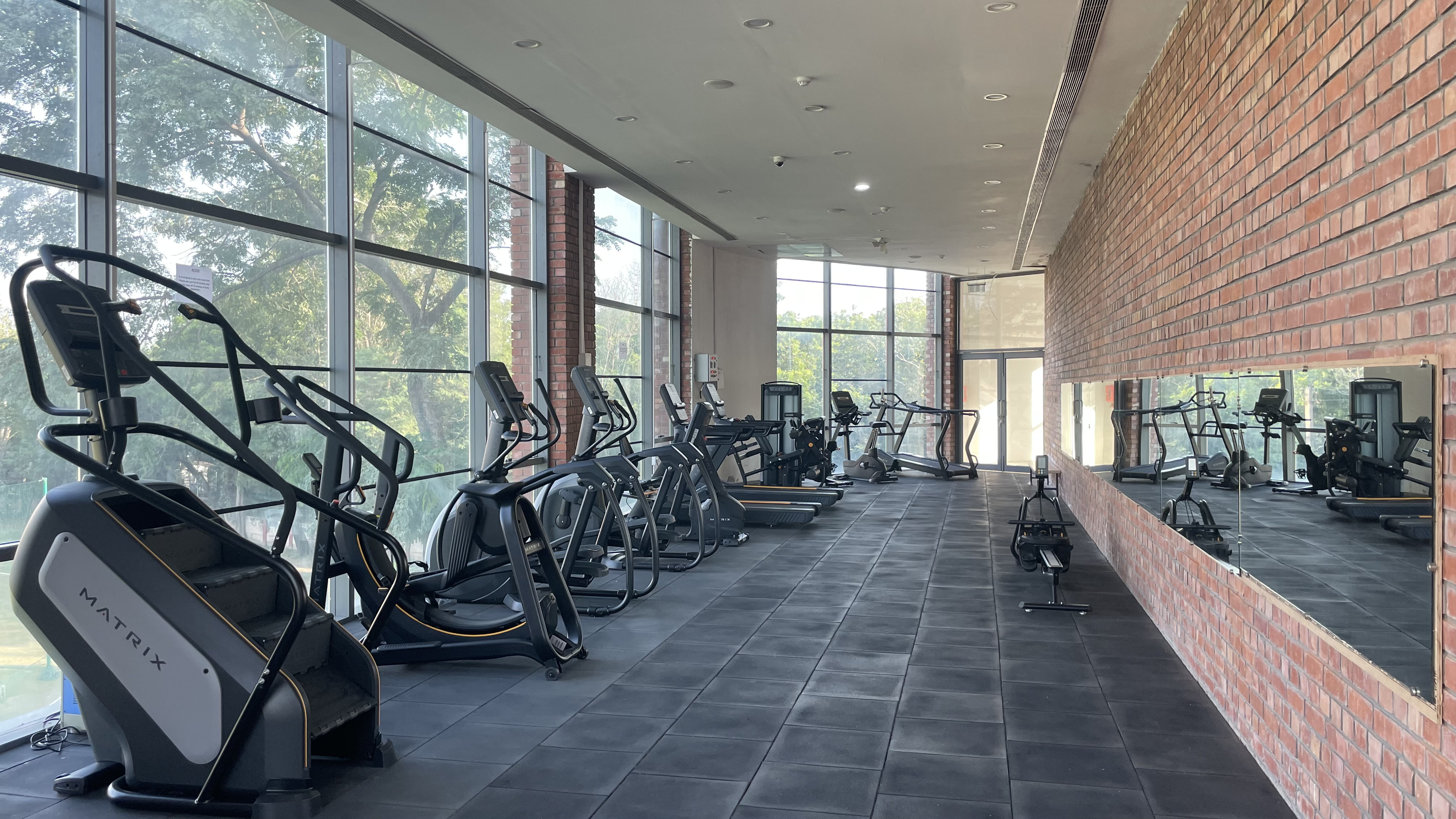
Gym in IITD

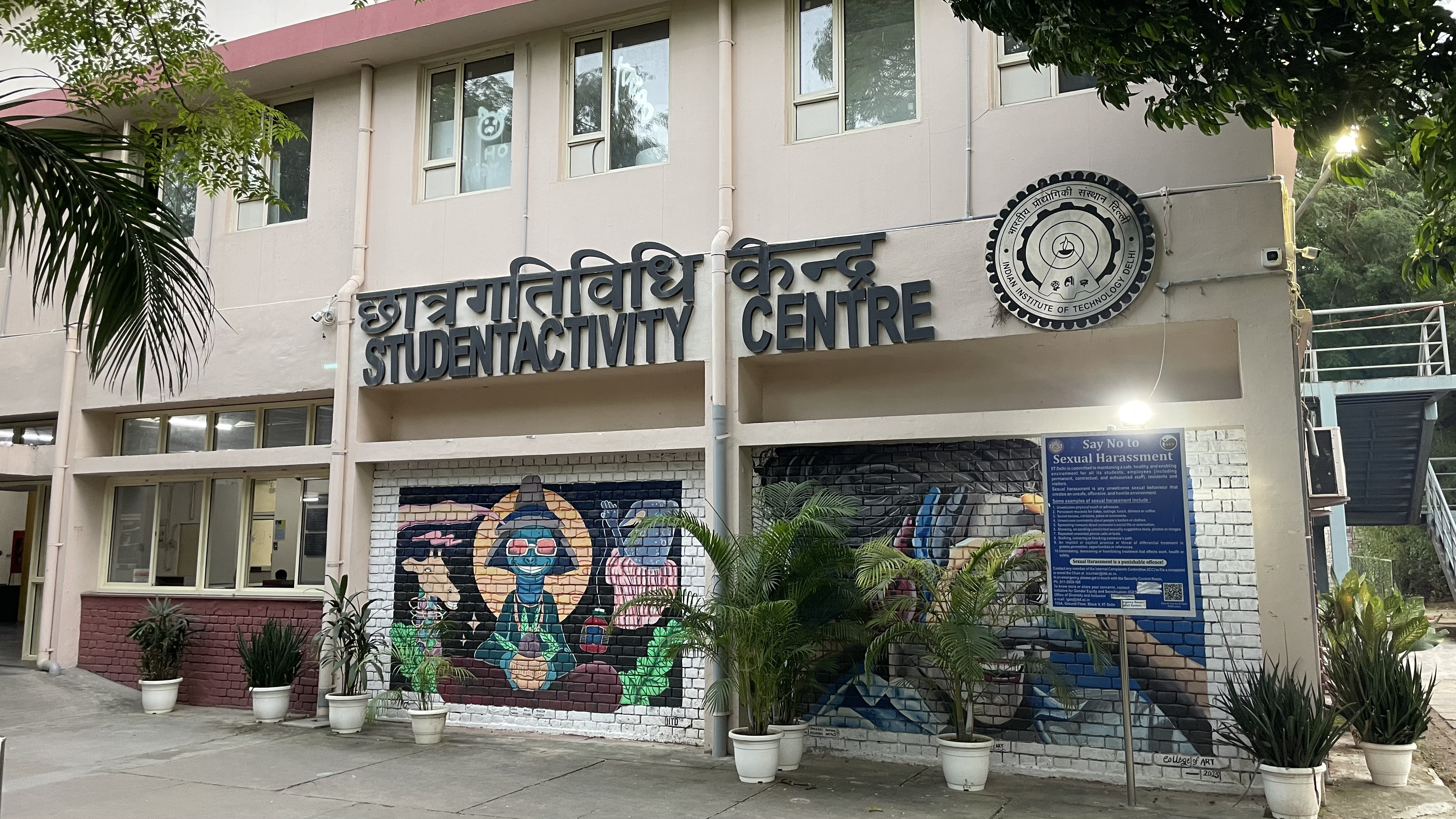
Student Activities Centre

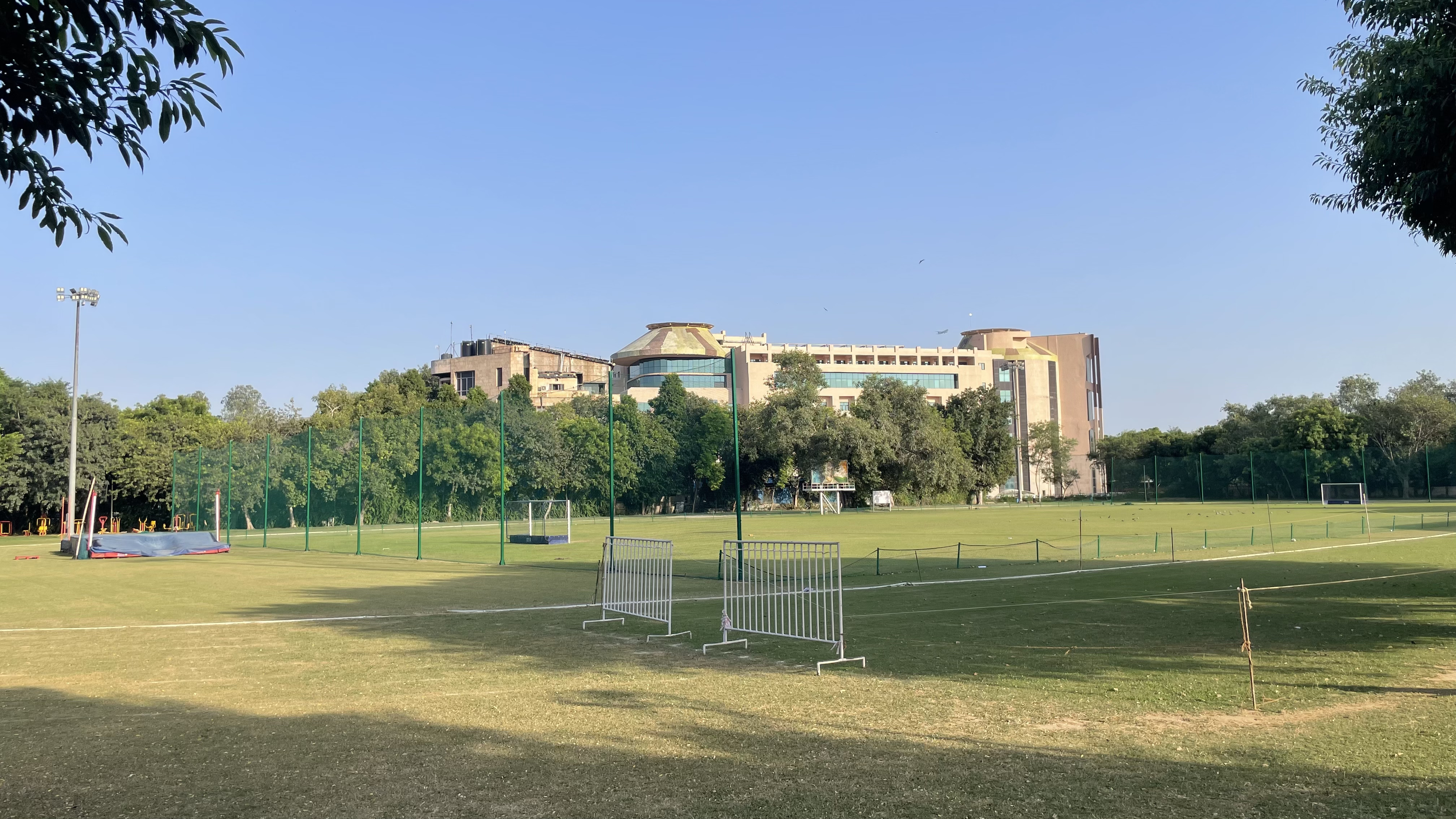
Landscape view of Academic Complex East

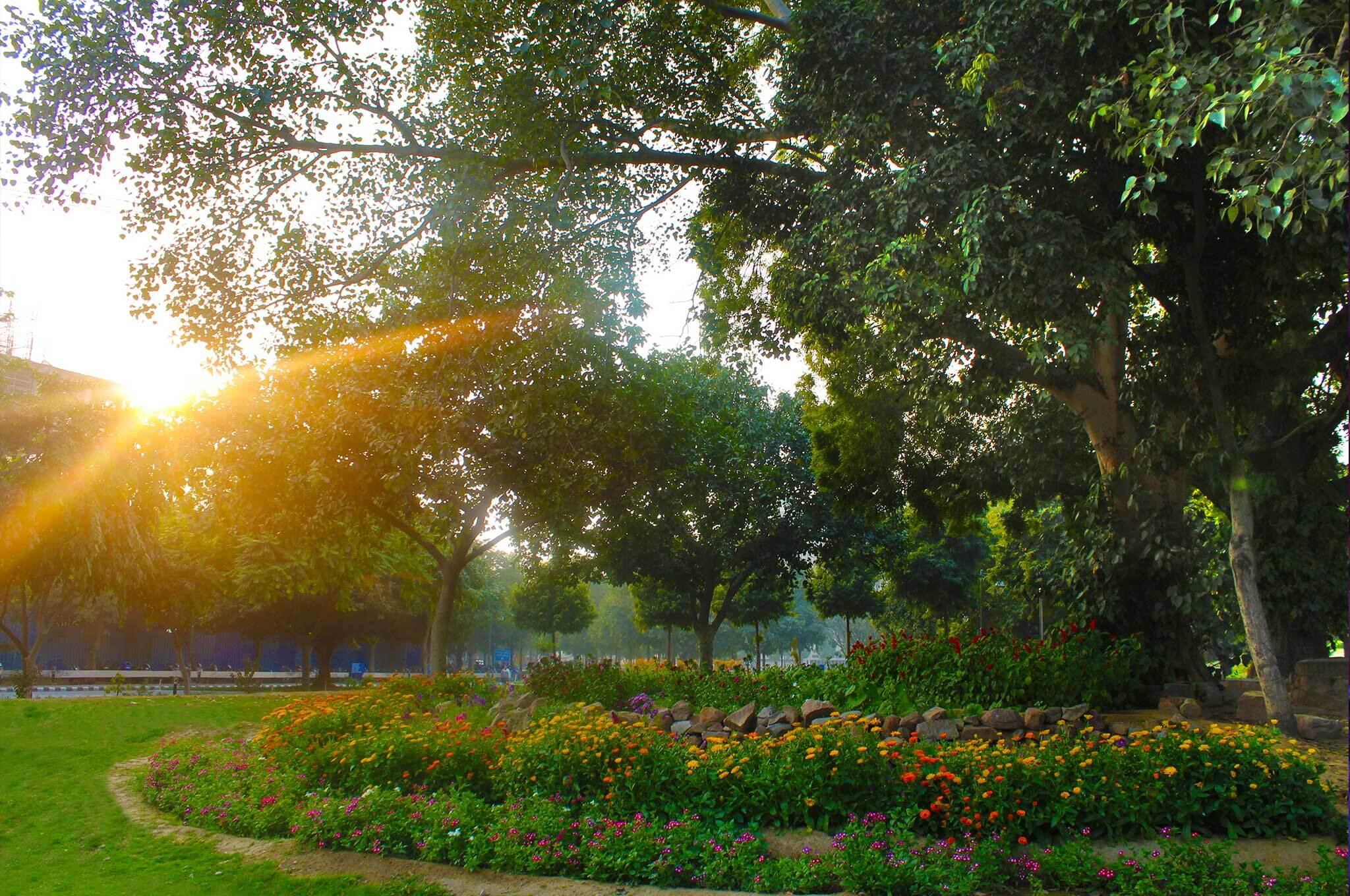
A garden in IIT Delhi

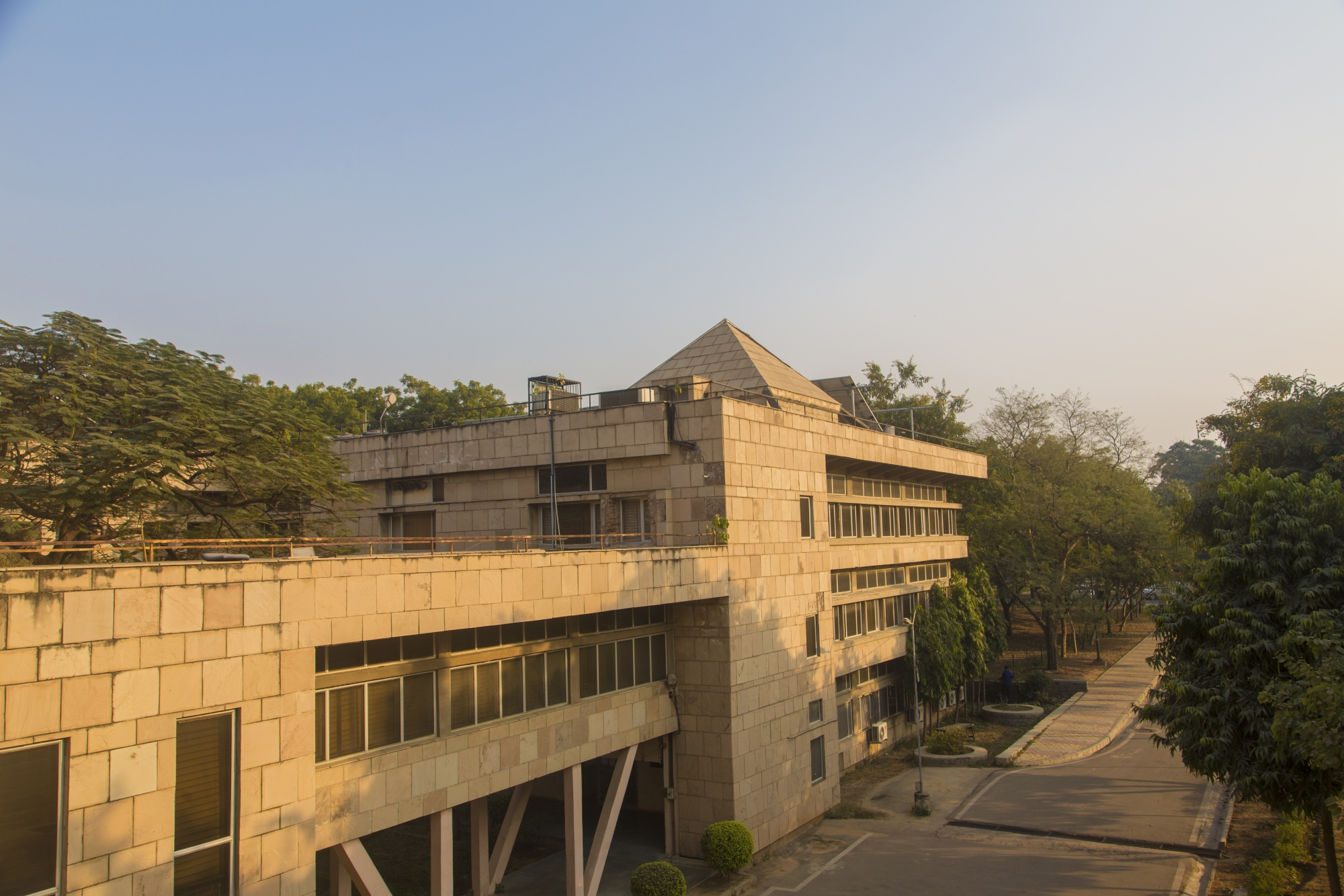
Kusuma School of Biological Sciences (KSBS) IIT Delhi

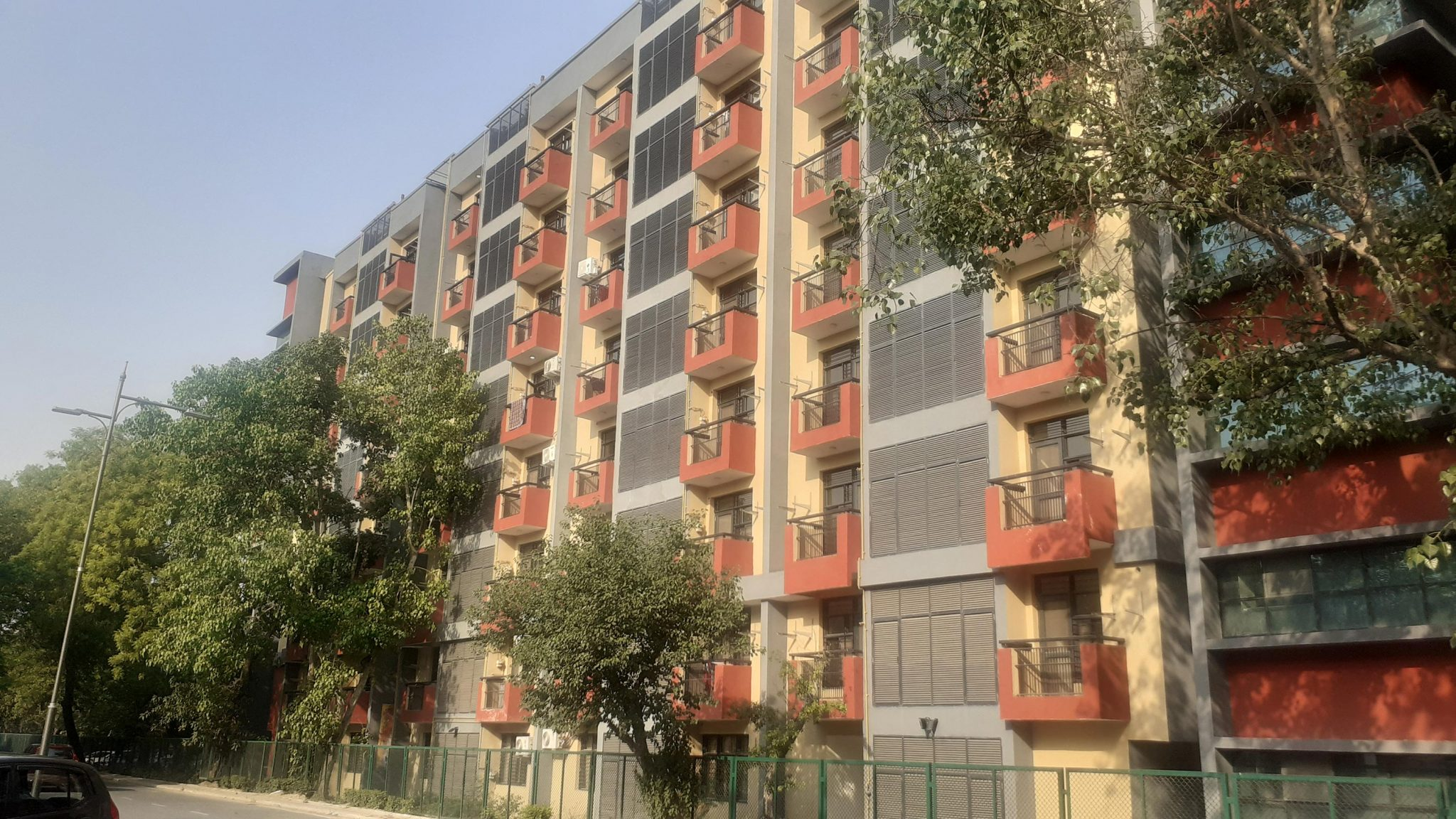
Nalanda apartments at IIT Delhi

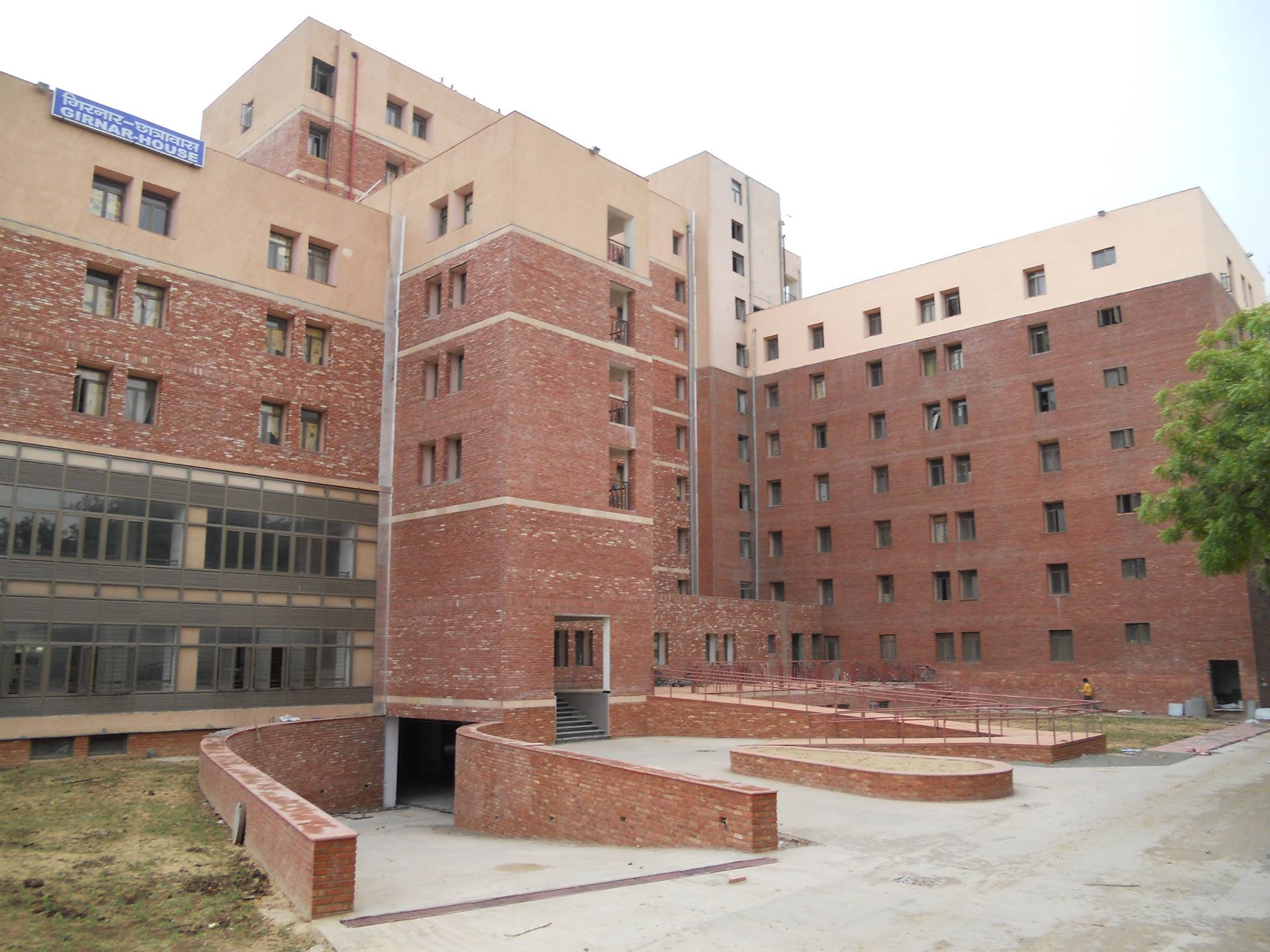
Girnar boys hostel IIT Delhi

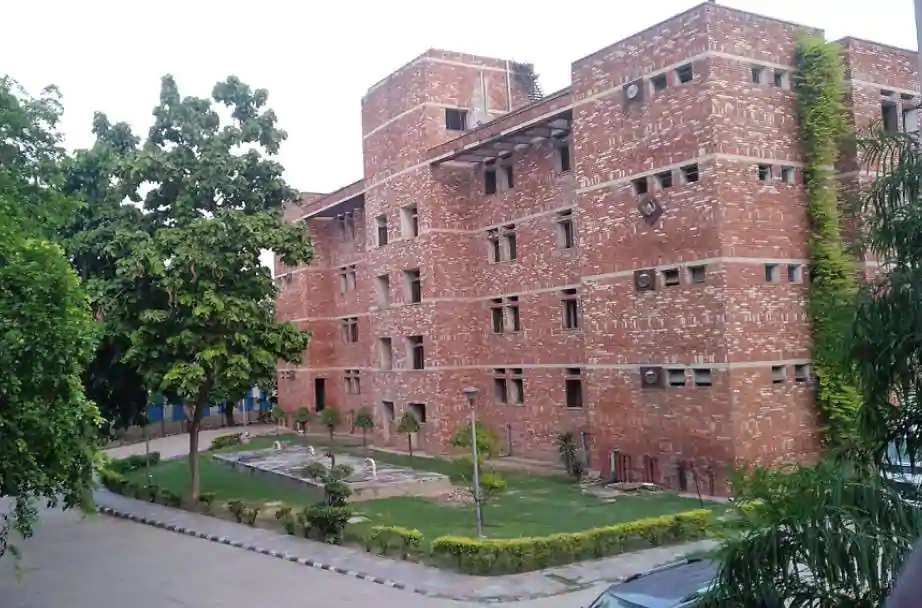
Zanskar boys hostel IIT Delhi

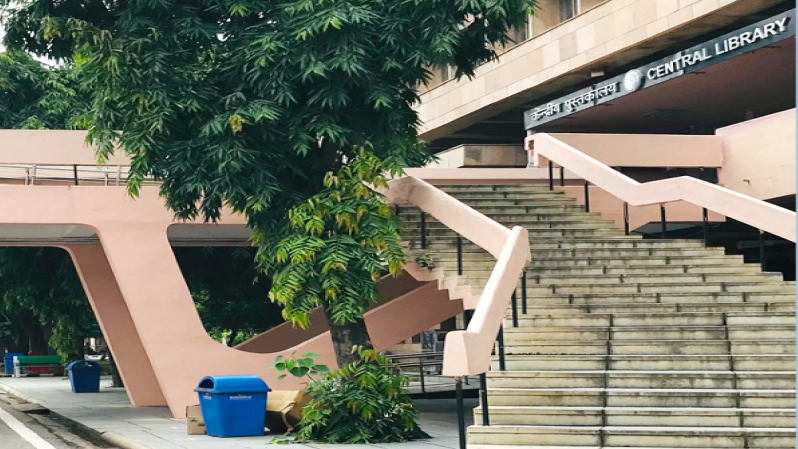
Entrance of Central Library, IITD

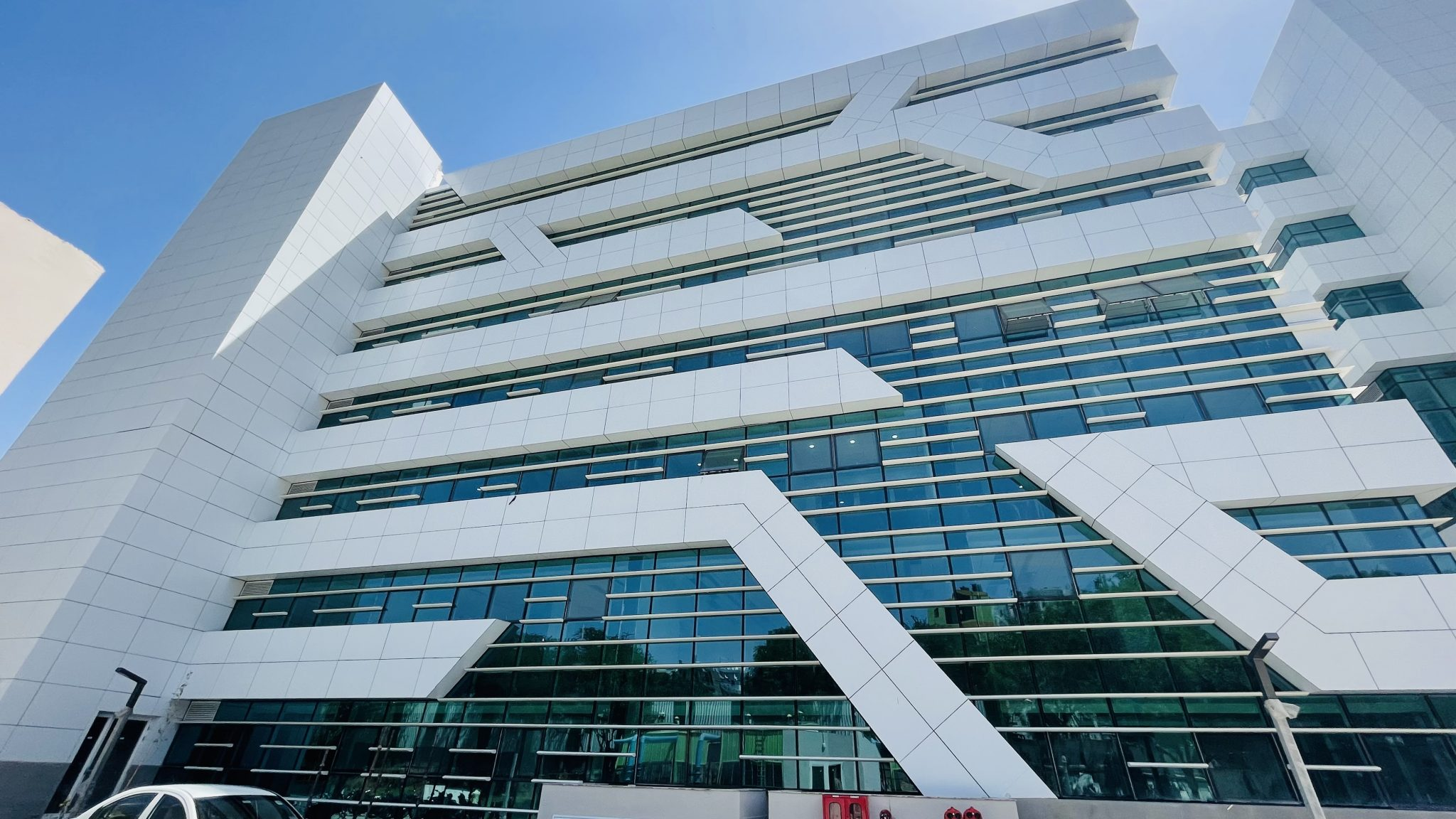
Technology park IIT Delhi main campus

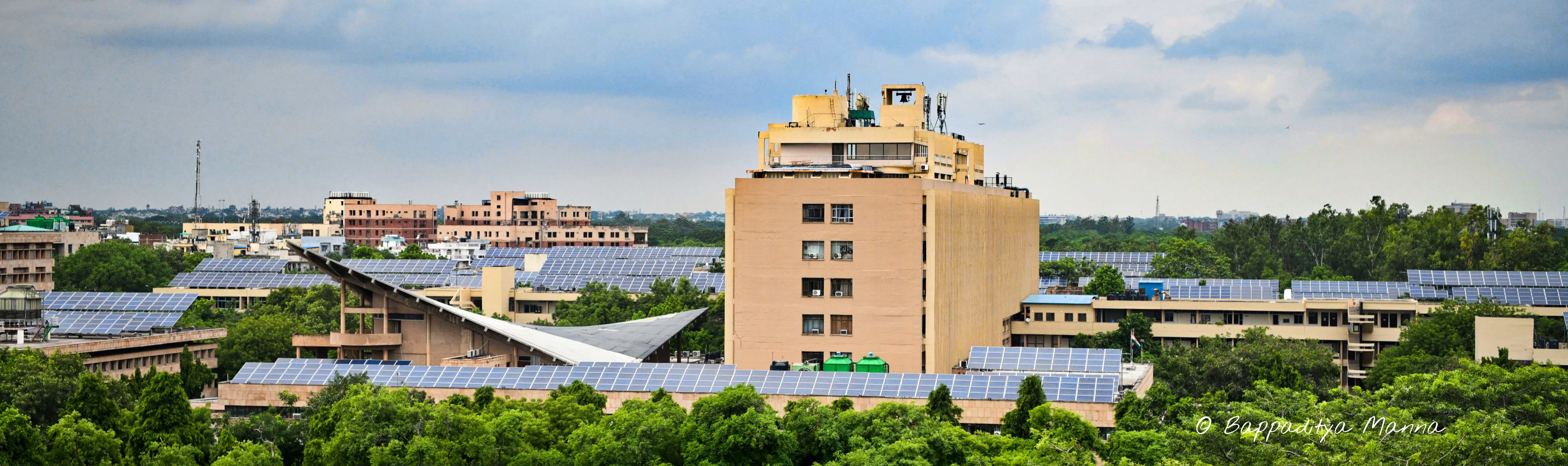
View of the main building from lecture hall complex

== See also ==
- Indian Institutes of Technology
- List of IIT Delhi people
- Indian Institute of Information Technology, Allahabad
- List of universities in India
- Universities and colleges in India
- Education in India
