= Nitin Kareer =

Indian civil servant

Chief Secretary Government of Maharashtra
- In office 1 January 2024 – 30 June 2024
- Chief Minister: Eknath Shinde
- Preceded by: Manoj Saunik
- Succeeded by: Sujata Saunik
- Governor: Ramesh Bais

Personal details
- Born: 29 March 1964 (age 62) Loni
- Occupation: IAS officer, Civil servant

Nitin Kareer (born 29 March 1964) is a retired 1988 batch Indian Administrative Service officer and former Chief Secretary of government of Maharashtra.

After joining Maharashtra cadre in 1988 of the Indian Administrative Service, he started his career as the Chief Executive Officer of Pune Zilla Parishad.

He also held posts like District Collector of Sangli, Pune, Director General of Information and Public Relations, Director General of Registration, Commissioner of Pune Municipal Corporation, Divisional Commissioner of Pune, Principal Secretary to the Chief Minister, Sales Tax Commissioner, and Jamabandi Commissioner.
