= Sanjay Kumar (civil servant) =

Indian civil servant

Chief Secretary Government of Maharashtra
- In office 1 July 2020 – 28 February 2021
- Governor: Bhagat Singh Koshyari
- Chief Minister: Uddhav Thackeray
- Preceded by: Ajoy Mehta
- Succeeded by: Sitaram Kunte

Chairman Maharashtra Electricity Regulatory Commission
- In office 5 March 2021 – 7 February 2026
- Preceded by: Anand Kulkarni
- Succeeded by: Valsa Nair Singh

Personal details
- Born: 8 February 1961 (age 65)
- Occupation: IAS officer, Civil servant

Sanjay Kumar (born 8 February 1961) is a 1984-batch Indian Administrative Service officer and was the Chief Secretary of the Government of Maharashtra. He also served as Chairman of the Maharashtra Electricity Regulatory Commission.
