= Sujata Saunik =

Indian civil servant

Chief Secretary Government of Maharashtra
- In office 1 July 2024 – 30 June 2025
- Chief Minister: Eknath Shinde; Devendra Fadnavis
- Governor: Ramesh Bais; C. P. Radhakrishnan
- Preceded by: Dr. Nitin Kareer
- Succeeded by: Rajesh Kumar Meena

Personal details
- Born: 15 June 1965 (age 61)
- Spouse: Manoj Saunik
- Children: 1
- Education: Harvard University
- Occupation: IAS officer, Civil servant
- Website: LinkedIn

Sujata Manoj Saunik (born 15 June 1965) is a retired 1987-batch Indian Administrative Service officer who served as Chief Secretary of the Government of Maharashtra. Saunik was the Additional Chief Secretary of Administrative Innovation, Excellence and Good Governance Department, Home Department, Ministry of Skill Development and Entrepreneurship (Maharashtra) and was also the Principal Secretary of Public Health and Financial Reform in the state of Maharashtra.

Between 2000 and 2006, Saunik worked at the United Nations Interim Administration Mission in Kosovo.

She served as the first woman to be appointed to the post of Chief Secretary in the Maharashtra Government. In August 2024, there were reports that she was being forced out of the post.
