= Bhushan Gagrani =

Indian Administrative Service officer

Municipal Commissioner of Brihanmumbai Municipal Corporation (BMC)
- Incumbent
- Assumed office 20 March 2024
- Preceded by: Iqbal Singh Chahal

Personal details
- Born: 25 March 1966 (age 60) Kolhapur, Maharashtra, India
- Education: (M.Com) Shivaji University (L.L.B) Nagpur University (M.B.A) University of Birmingham
- Occupation: IAS officer
- Profession: Civil servant, IAS officer

Bhushan Gagrani is an Indian Administrative Service officer of the 1990 batch from Maharashtra cadre who serves as the Municipal Commissioner of Brihanmumbai Municipal Corporation (BMC) since March 2024. He also secured an All-India rank 3 in UPSC Civil Service Examination held in 1990.

== Early life ==
Bhushan Gagrani was born in the year 1966 into a Marwadi family in Kolhapur, Maharashtra, India. He grew up in a region known for its cultural heritage, which contributed to his understanding of the Marathi language and culture.

Gagrani pursued his education in Kolhapur, completing his post-graduation and obtained an M.Com degree from Shivaji University. He later earned an L.L.B degree from Nagpur University and an M.B.A degree from the University of Birmingham in the UK.

In 1990, Gagrani secured an All-India Rank (AIR) 3 in the UPSC Civil Services Examination. He became the first IAS officer to clear the examination using Marathi as the medium of instruction for the written test.
