= Ajoy Mehta =

Indian civil officer (born 1959)

Chief Secretary Government of Maharashtra
- In office 10 May 2019 – 20 July 2020
- Governor: Bhagat Singh Koshyari
- Chief Minister: Uddhav Thackeray
- Preceded by: Bhushan Gagrani
- Succeeded by: Sanjay Kumar (IAS)

Principal Advisor to Chief Minister Maharashtra(Maharashtra)|Principal Advisor of Chief Minister
- In office 20 July 2020 – 11 February 2021
- Preceded by: Post Created
- Succeeded by: Sitaram Kunte

Municipal Commissioner of Mumbai
- In office May 2015 – 13 May 2019
- Preceded by: Sitaram Kunte
- Succeeded by: Praveen Pardeshi

Principal Secretary, Dept. of Environment, Govt. of Maharashtra.

Personal details
- Born: 21 September 1959 (age 67)
- Education: IIT BHU
- Occupation: IAS officer

Ajoy Mehta (born 21 September 1959) is a 1984 batch retired Indian Administrative Service (IAS) officer and former Chief Secretary of Maharashtra and Municipal Commissioner of Mumbai. He succeeded Sitaram Kunte as the Municipal Commissioner of Mumbai. He served as the Chief Secretary of Maharashtra from 10 May 2019 till 11 February 2021. Thereafter, he served as Chairman of the Maharashtra Real Estate Regulatory Authority from 12 February 2021 till 20 September 2024.

== Development ==
After taking over as Municipal Commissioner Ajoy Mehta has started work on affordable housing in the draft development plan. He has also tackled the sanitation issue in Mumbai.

== Civil service ==
Ajoy Mehta is a 1984 Cadre from the Maharashtra Batch of the IAS. He joined IAS after completing his engineering from IIT BHU.

Political offices
Preceded by Sitaram Kunte	Municipal Commissioner of Mumbai; 2012-2015	Succeeded by Praveen Pardeshi
