= Rangan Banerjee =

Indian academic

Rangan Banerjee (born 16 January 1964) currently holds the position of Director at IIT Delhi, where he is also a professor at the Department of Energy Science and Engineering. As on November 2026, he is on lien from IIT Bombay, where he was the Forbes Marshall Chair Professor in the Department of Energy Science and Engineering, a department he contributed to founding in 2007. His expertise encompasses energy management, system modeling, energy planning, policy, hydrogen energy, and fuel cells.

== Academic career ==
Prof Banerjee played a pivotal role in establishing a megawatt-scale Solar Thermal Power Testing and Research Facility funded by the Ministry of New and Renewable Energy (MNRE). He also advises Team Shunya, the first Indian student team to reach the Solar Decathlon Europe finals. Prof. Banerjee has provided counsel to city and state energy entities, Niti Aayog, and MNRE on energy topics and has collaborated with various national and international companies.

In the past, he served as the Dean (R&D) at IIT Bombay, where he received the Excellence in Teaching Award and is recognized as a Fellow of the Indian National Academy of Engineering. Additionally, Prof. Banerjee held an honorary adjunct faculty position in the Department of Engineering & Public Policy at Carnegie Mellon University. He has an H Index 50 on Google scholar as of November, 2026.
