= Praveen Pardeshi =

Indian Administrative Service officer

Praveensinh Pardeshi
- Occupations: Secretary, Ministry of Marathi Language
- Years active: 1985-2021
- Organization: Government of Maharashtra

Praveensingh Pratapsingh Pardeshi (born 3 November 1961) is an Indian Administrative Service (IAS) officer of the 1985 batch with over 36 years of experience in the services, and former Municipal Commissioner of Mumbai. Pardeshi has held various senior leadership positions within the United Nations as the Chief of Transition Recovery unit, UNDP Geneva and Senior Coordinator of United Nations International Strategy for Disaster Reduction (UNISDR) . He has subsequently headed the regional offices Support and Co-ordination Unit of UNISDR. Pardeshi has been a key player in post-disaster and conflict recovery programs of UNDP and the public administration, governance reform, wildlife conservation and public health effort against COVID-19 in Maharashtra, India. Pardeshi was the Global Programme Coordinator for the Defeat-NCD Partnership within United Nations Institute of Training and Research (UNITAR).

He was appointed as Secretary in the Ministry of Marathi Language in June 2021 till 30 November 2021.

== Early life and education ==
Praveen Pardeshi was born on 3 November 1961, in Mumbai, India. Pardeshi attended secondary school and higher secondary school in Jorhat, Assam and Agra, UP, respectively. Pardeshi pursued his bachelor's degree in Economics and Statistics at the University of Delhi from June 1979 to May 1982. Pardeshi got his master's degree in economics from Delhi School of Economics, graduating in May 1984.

From August 1985 to July 1987, Pardeshi attended Lal Bahadur Shastri National Academy of Administration in Mussoorie, Uttarakhand as part of inservice training for Indian Administrative Services. He studied public administration, economic policies, law and order and conducting elections.

After working for the Indian Administrative Services for 13 years; Pardeshi took a short break to pursue another master's degree in Social Policy, Participatory Planning and Economic Development at London School of Economics, graduating in September 1999.

== Career ==
Pardeshi was all India first in the Indian Administrative Services batch of 1985. From 1985 to 1998, he held various assignments in the Indian Administrative Services. He began his career as Assistant Collector in Panvel, Raigad. Here he was in charge of land reforms and the cyclone rehabilitation program in Maharashtra. While working in development administration, he served as the chief executive officer of Amravati District Council, and oversaw 12,000 development staff. Under his leadership, Amravati District stood first in 1990/91 in Maharashtra for achieving 20 point economic program which included contracting homes for rural homeless and providing self employment opportunities to the poor.

In the Latur District, Pardeshi worked as the District Collector and District Magistrate, and supervised law and order, along with drought management. In September 1993, Latur District was devastated by an earthquake of 6.7 Richter scale with Killari village as the epicenter . Pardeshi managed the Earthquake relief works following the Killari Earthquake and successfully implemented a Killari Earthquake reconstruction project. This was an early example of ‘Build Back Better’ as all the post earthquake reconstruction was seismically safe and local communities were trained to adopt seismically safe construction methods.

From 1993 to 1995, Pardeshi represented the Government of Maharashtra in Washington and successfully negotiated a $335 million loan from the World Bank for post-earthquake reconstruction. As District Collector, he was the Latur Project Manager of the Maharashtra Emergency Earthquake Program (MEERP). Pardeshi supervised the program and budget, and reconstructed 30 villages, 110,000 houses and large infrastructure such as water supply and roads. The World Bank evaluation of this programme was ‘satisfactory’. Afterwards, Pardeshi continued to work in the Indian Administrative Services as District Collector in Latur, Municipal Commissioner in Pune and Secretary to Chief Minister in Maharashtra. Pardeshi conducted elections in the Solapur parliamentary and provincial assembly, involving the registration of 1.2 million voters. As District Collector, Pardeshi was the ex-officio President of the Red Cross Bank, and President of the Solapur Blindness Control Society. While serving as Municipal commissioner of PCMC, Pune, Pardeshi oversaw a budget of US$50 million and staff of over 20,000 personnel and worked on infrastructure development, public health, water supply, education and town-planning.

Before joining the UNDP in Gujarat in 2001, in the midst of working for the Indian Administrative Services, Pardeshi worked as a short term consultant for the World Bank. From February 1998 to March 1998, Pardeshi was a resettlement consultant in southern China, and ensured compliance with World Bank resettlement standards. While working as a consultant, Pardeshi provided equitable access to displaced by highway construction including womenheaded households with livelihood opportunities through.

From February 2001 to November 2001, Pardeshi worked as a programme manager for the UNDP in Gujarat. In this role, he was the team leader of the UNDP Transitional Recovery Program, and led the efforts for post-earthquake recovery and reconstruction. He established the transitional recovery team, increased the program size from $550,000 to $11 million and coordinated with other field programs to construct more than 1500 earthquake resistant homes.

In December 2001, Pardeshi worked at the UNDP as the team leader of the Recovery Unit within the Bureau for Crisis Prevention and Recovery. He supported country offices to develop and implement post-conflict recovery programs. Pardeshi set up the Post Conflict Recovery Unit, and managed the field programs of US$53 million, as spread over 16 post conflict recovery nations. Also, he established the vision of transition recovery within the UNDP, as a process of meeting millennium development goals. In Nepal, Pardeshi led the conflict assessment and reprogramming mission to Nepal, effectively completely realigning the Nepal UNDP country program to alleviate conflict-fueling factors targeting villages with higher poverty and ethnic diversity.

Pardeshi joined the UNISDR in Geneva as a Senior Coordinator, on a joint post shared by UNDP and UNISDR. From October 2004 to 2007, Pardeshi designed and implemented UNDP and UNISDR post disaster mitigation and recovery programs. He worked on the post tsunami reconstruction and rehabilitation programs in Aceh, Indonesia and Bangladesh. Also, he designed the post-earthquake reconstruction program in Pakistan. In 2009, Pardeshi became the Chief of the Regional Offices of UNISDR and oversaw all regional offices of Africa, Asia, Latin America and Europe. Pardeshi oversaw policies on mainstreaming disaster reduction in development programmes. He worked with the World Bank to establish the Global Facility for Disaster Risk Reduction, the UN World Bank Partnership for Disaster Risk Reduction. Pardeshi also participated in development of the African Programme of Disaster Reduction with the African Union Commission. He also worked closely with organisation of Arab states to promote policies to integrate climate risk mitigation and disaster management.

In October 2010, Pardeshi left his role as the Chief of Regional Office of UNISDR to rejoin the IAS as Divisional Commissioner in Amravati. Pardeshi served in this role from October 2010 to May 2011. He then served as Principal Secretary, Forest from 2011 to 2014. He prioritised participatory wildlife conservation, was instrumental in notifying new Tiger Reserves and Wildlife sanctuaries, leading to increased tiger population in Maharashtra and instituting new Community Forest Management rules to enable indigenous people to co-manage forests.

Finally, Pardeshi took on the role of Additional Chief Secretary to Chief Minister of Maharashtra from 2014 to 2019. Within these roles, Pardeshi played a key role in steering critical reforms to change economic institutions to be aligned to efficient growth, liberalising labour and land markets to ensure ease of doing business and efficient allocation of resource, decentralizing the transfer powers to local administrative units. Pardeshi also helped set up the Chief Minister War Room Office, overlooking key Mumbai metro, transportation, airport and solar energy infrastructure projects within the state, with a capital expenditure of over US$22 billion. Within the public health sector, Pardeshi contributed towards development of cashless insurance scheme, and implemented the expansion of the Chief Ministers Medical Assistance Trust Fund.

By May 2019, Pardeshi became the Municipal Commissioner of Mumbai, India. In this role, Pardeshi transformed the Public Transport undertaking, BEST, by expanding the fleet through franchise model, rationalised the fares and implemented an Integrated Traffic Management system, increasing bus passengers from 3.2 million to 4 million. He managed the entire public health infrastructure of Mumbai. Pardeshi led COVID-19 management, and developed infrastructure to supervise accelerated testing, tracing and quarantining of COVID-19 patients. He achieved a 5 times increase in testing within a month and pioneered an advanced analytics method to identify and contain high intensity zones. Also, Pardeshi set up over 2,000 containment zones in slum areas across the city.

In May 2020, Pardeshi left his position as Municipal Commissioner and is currently working at UNITAR as the Global Programme Coordinator for the Defeat-NCD Partnership. His current responsibilities include the scaling up of the D-NCD programme to 90 Low resource countries, by supporting national governments to develop costed action plans to address NCD and raise sustainable finances to implement these plans.

Mr. Pardeshi has experience in policy development, training design, and the evaluation of online training initiatives through his work with the Capacity Building Commission.

Political offices
Preceded by Ajoy Mehta	Municipal Commissioner of Mumbai; 2012-2015	Incumbent
