= Sitaram Kunte =

Indian Administrative Service Officer

Principal Adviser to the Chief Minister's Secretariat Government of Maharashtra
- In office 30 November 2021 – 31 July 2022
- Appointed by: Uddhav Thackeray (Chief Minister)
- Chief Minister: Uddhav Thackeray Eknath Shinde

Chief Secretary Government of Maharashtra
- In office 28 February 2021 – 30 November 2021
- Governor: Bhagat Singh Koshyari
- Chief Minister: Uddhav Thackeray
- Preceded by: Sanjay Kumar (IAS)
- Succeeded by: Debashish Chakrabarty, IAS

Additional Chief Secretary (Personnel) General Administration Department Government of Maharashtra
- In office June 2018 – 28 February 2021

Principal Secretary of the Finance Department Government of Maharashtra
- In office May 2015 – April 2016

Municipal Commissioner of Mumbai
- In office 01 May 2012 – 28 April 2015
- Appointed by: Prithviraj Chavan (Chief Minister)

Personal details
- Born: 3 November 1961 (age 64)
- Education: Delhi School of Economics; Delhi University
- Occupation: Civil service IAS

Sitaram Janardan Kunte (born 3 November 1961) 1985-batch Indian Administrative Service officer. He is a former chief secretary to Government of Maharashtra and former principal advisor to in CMO Maharashtra. Sitaram Janardan Kunte succeeded Subodh Kumar as the Municipal Commissioner of Mumbai on May 1, 2012.

== Career ==
Sitaram Kunte has handed several departments in the Maharashtra Government . He was head of Maharashtra Housing and Area Development Authority and served as an additional municipal commissioner in the BMC.

== Government of Maharashtra Departments ==
- Additional chief secretary (personnel) general administration department, government of Maharashtra June 2018 – present
- Principal Secretary Government of Maharashtra in the Finance Department May 2015 – April 2016
- Municipal Commissioner Municipal Corporation of Greater Mumbai April 2012 – May 2015
- Principal Secretary, Planning Department Government of Maharashtra June 2011 – May 2012
- Principal Secretary Planning Department and Development Commissioner in Government of Maharashtra.
- Secretary, Housing Department Government of Maharashtra May 2008 – September 2010

Political offices
Preceded by Subodh Kumar	Municipal Commissioner of Mumbai; 2012-2015	Succeeded by Ajoy Mehta
