= Central library, IIT Delhi =

Library in Delhi

- केंद्रीय पुस्तकालय भारतीय प्रौद्योगिकी संस्थान दिल्ली
- Location: New Delhi, India

Other information
- Employees: 40+
- Parent organization: IIT Delhi
- Website: library.iitd.ac.in

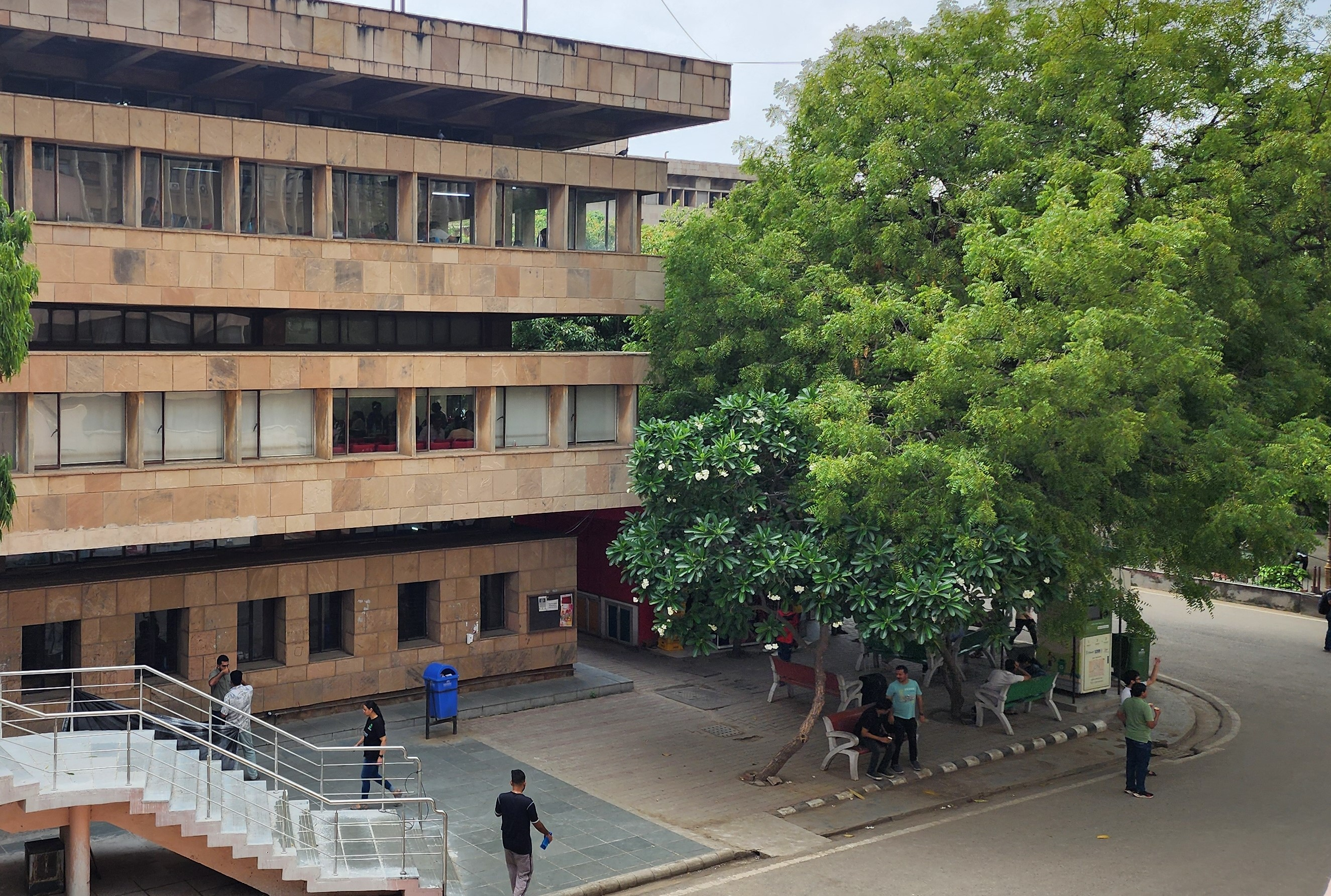
Central Library, Indian Institute of Technology Delhi

The Central library is the main library of the Indian Institute of Technology Delhi (IIT Delhi), located in Hauz Khas, New Delhi. The library provides access to resources to students, faculty, scholars, and researchers in both print and digital formats.

== History ==
The library's cornerstone was laid by K.C. Pant, on 18 May 1985. The new building was inaugurated in 1988 by P.V. Narasimha Rao. Over time, the library has expanded from traditional print-based collections to digital resources.

== Notable Visits ==
On 10 November 2026, the Lieutenant Governor of Delhi, Taranjit Singh Sandhu, visited the Central Library at the Indian Institute of Technology Delhi. During the visit, he recalled using the library while studying at Jawaharlal Nehru University and observed renovated facilities.
