= Swadhin Kshatriya =

Indian Civil Servant

Chief Secretary Government of Maharashtra
- Incumbent
- Assumed office May 2014

Municipal commissioner
- In office 2009–2011

Personal details
- Occupation: Civil service IAS

Swadhin Kshatriya was the Chief Secretary Government of Maharashtra and senior most Civil service IAS officer in Maharashtra.

He was appointed to organize Prime minister Narendra Modi's pet project Make in India in Maharashtra by the Government.

Swadhin Kshatriya was also the Municipal commissioner of Mumbai from 2009 to 2011.

Swadhin Kshatriya is a 1980 batch of the Maharashtra Civil service IAS.
