= List of chief secretaries of Jharkhand =

Chief Secretary of Jharkhand of Government of Jharkhand
- Flag of India

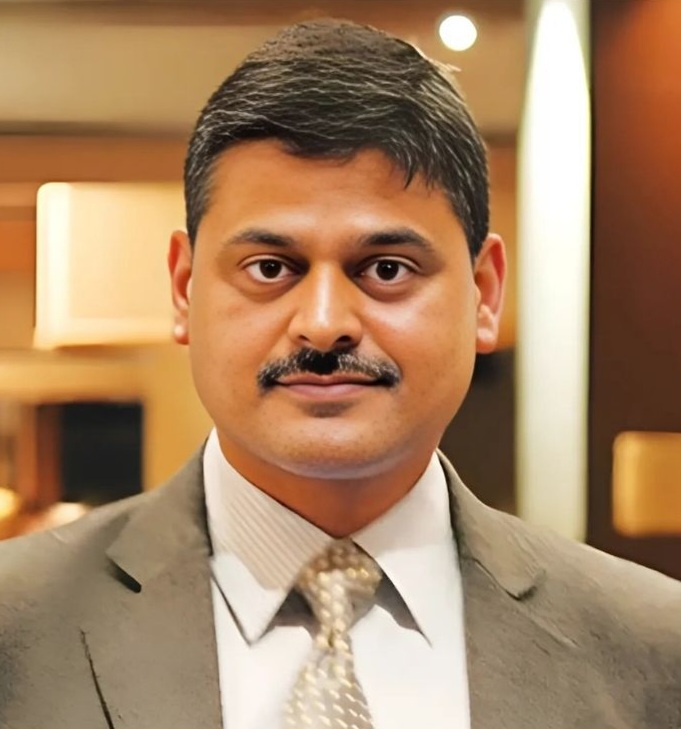
- Incumbent; Avinash Kumar since 1 October 2025
- Reports to: Governor & Chief Minister Jharkhand
- Seat: 1st Floor, Project Bhawan, Dhurwa, Ranchi -834004
- Appointer: Chief Minister of Jharkhand
- Inaugural holder: Vijai Shankar Dubey (2000–2002)

The Chief Secretary of Jharkhand is the top-most executive official and senior-most civil servant of the state of Jharkhand, India. The Chief Secretary is the ex-officio head of the state Civil Services Board, the State Secretariat, the state cadre Indian Administrative Service and all civil services under the rules of business of the state government. The Chief Secretary acts as the principal advisor to the chief minister on all matters of state administration.

The Chief Secretary is the officer of Indian Administrative Service. The Chief Secretary is the senior-most cadre post in the state administration, ranking 23rd on the Indian order of precedence. The Chief Secretary acts as an ex-officio secretary to the state cabinet, therefore called "Secretary to the Cabinet". The status of this post is equal to that of a Secretary to the Government of India.

Avinash Kumar is the current Chief Secretary of the Government of Jharkhand, since on 1 October 2025.

== Chief secretaries ==
No.	Name	Took office	Left office
1	Vijay Shankar Dubey	15 November 2000	31 July 2002
2	G. Krishnan	1 August 2002	31 March 2003
3	A. K. Mishra	1 April 2003	31 October 2003
4	Laxmi Singh	1 November 2003	13 December 2004
5	P. P. Sharma	14 December 2004	18 January 2006
6	M. K. Mandal	19 January 2006	28 February 2007
7	A. K. Chug	1 March 2007	15 August 2007
8	P. P. Sharma	16 August 2007	24 February 2008
9	A. K. Basu	25 February 2008	31 August 2009
10	Shiv Basant	1 September 2009	3 April 2010
11	A. K. Singh	3 April 2010	15 March 2011
12	A. K. Choudhary	15 March 2011	31 March 2013
13	R. S. Sharma	31 March 2013	30 April 2014
14	Sajal Chakraborty	30 April 2014	14 August 2014
15	Sudhir Prasad	14 August 2014	30 September 2014
(14)	Sajal Chakraborty	1 October 2014	15 December 2014
16	R. S. Poddar	16 December 2014	19 December 2014
(14)	Sajal Chakraborty	19 December 2014	20 January 2015
17	Rajiv Gauba	27 January 2015	31 March 2016
18	Rajbala Verma	31 March 2016	28 February 2018
19	Sudhir Tripathi	28 February 2018	31 March 2019
20	D. K. Tiwari	31 March 2019	31 March 2020
21	Sukhdev Singh	1 April 2020	6 December 2023
22	L. Khiangte	6 December 2023	31 October 2024
23	Alka Tiwari	1 November 2024	30 September 2025
24	Avinash Kumar	1 October 2025	Incumbent

== See also ==
- Government of Jharkhand
- Indian Administrative Service
- List of chief secretaries of Mizoram
