= List of chief secretaries of Maharashtra =

Chief Secretary of Maharashtra of Government of Maharashtra
- Seal of the state of Maharashtra

- Flag of India

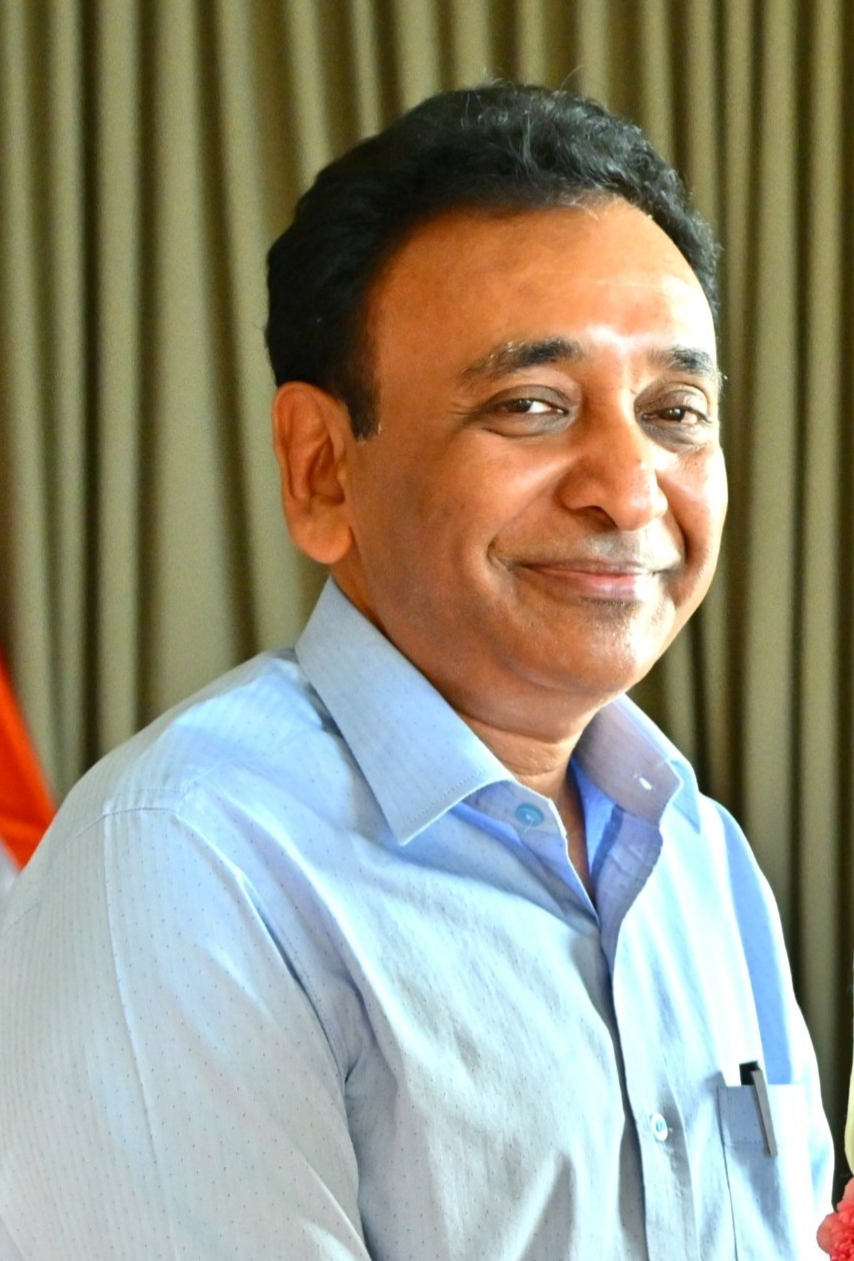
- Incumbent; Rajesh Aggarwal since 1 December 2025
- Reports to: Governor & Chief Minister Maharashtra
- Residence: A-10 Bungalow, Madame Cama Road, Mumbai
- Seat: 6th Floor, Mantralaya, Mumbai
- Appointer: Chief Minister of Maharashtra

The Chief Secretary of Maharashtra is the top-most executive official and senior-most civil servant of the Maharashtra State.

- The Chief Secretary is the ex-officio head of the state Civil Services Board, the State Secretariat, the state cadre Indian Administrative Service and all civil services under the rules of business of the state government.
  - The Chief Secretary acts as the principal advisor to the chief minister on all matters of state administration.

The Chief Secretary is the officer of Indian Administrative Service. The Chief Secretary is the senior-most cadre post in the state administration, ranking 23rd on the Indian order of precedence. The Chief Secretary acts as an ex-officio secretary to the state cabinet, therefore called "Secretary to the Cabinet". The status of this post is equal to that of a Secretary to the Government of India.

Rajesh Aggarwal is the current Chief Secretary of the Government of Maharashtra, appointed on 1 December 2025.

== Past Chief Secretaries ==
Sl.	Name	Term of office			Ref.
1	N. T. Mone	1 May 1960	16 August 1964	4 years, 107 days	
2	D. R. Pradhan	17 August 1964	4 September 1967	3 years, 18 days	
3	B. B. Pemaster	5 September 1967	24 September 1971	4 years, 19 days	
4	L. G. Rajwade	25 September 1971	7 November 1972	1 year, 43 days	
5	L. M. Nadkarni	8 November 1972	30 September 1973	326 days	
6	D. D. Sathe	1 October 1973	30 September 1976	2 years, 365 days	
7	J. B. D'Souza	1 October 1976	31 May 1977	242 days	
8	S. V. Bhave	1 June 1977	31 May 1978	364 days	
9	L. S. Lulla	1 June 1978	19 April 1979	322 days	
10	P. D. Kasbekar	20 April 1979	30 September 1979	163 days	
11	P. G. Gavai	1 October 1979	31 July 1982	2 years, 303 days	
12	R. D. Pradhan	23 August 1982	14 January 1985	2 years, 144 days	
13	B. G. Deshmukh	7 March 1985	31 July 1986	1 year, 146 days	
14	K. G. Paranjape	1 August 1986 -	31 August 1988	2 years, 30 days	
15	D. M. Sukhthankar	1 September 1988	31 August 1990	1 year, 364 days	
16	K. B. Shrinivas	1 September 1990	31 December 1991	1 year, 121 days	
17	S. Ramamurti	1 January 1992	10 March 1993	1 year, 68 days	
18	N. Raghunathan	11 March 1993	30 September 1994	1 year, 203 days	
19	Sharad Upasani	1 October 1994	17 January 1996	1 year, 108 days	
20	Dinesh Afzalpurkar	24 February 1996	31 August 1997	1 year, 188 days	
21	P. Subramanyam	31 August 1997	25 May 1999	1 year, 266 days	
22	A. L. Bongirwar	25 May 1999	24 January 2001	1 year, 244 days	
23	V. Ranganathan	24 January 2001	30 September 2002	1 year, 249 days	
24	Ajit M. Nimbalkar	1 October 2002	31 May 2004	1 year, 243 days	
25	Arun Kumar Mago	1 June 2004	30 October 2004	151 days	
26	Navin Kumar	31 October 2004	8 December 2004	38 days	
27	R. K. Premkumar	8 December 2004	28 February 2006	1 year, 82 days	
28	D. K. Shankaran	1 April 2006	30 April 2007	1 year, 29 days	
29	Johny Joseph	30 April 2007	30 November 2009	2 years, 214 days	
30	J. P. Dange	30 November 2009	4 January 2011	1 year, 35 days	
31	R. Y. Gaikwad	4 January 2011	31 May 2012	1 year, 148 days	
32	J. K. Banthiya	31 May 2012	30 November 2013	1 year, 183 days	
33	J. S. Sahariya	30 November 2013	31 July 2014	243 days	
34	Swadheen Kshatriya	31 July 2014	28 February 2017	2 years, 212 days	
35	Summet Mallik	28 February 2017	30 April 2018	1 year, 61 days	
36	Dinesh Kumar Jain	30 April 2018	26 March 2019	330 days	
37	U. P. S. Madan	27 March 2019	13 May 2019	47 days	
38	Ajoy Mehta	13 May 2019	30 June 2020	1 year, 48 days	
39	Sanjay Kumar	1 July 2020	28 February 2021	242 days	
40	Sitaram Kunte	28 February 2021	30 November 2021	275 days	
41	Debashish Chakrabarty	30 November 2021	28 February 2022	90 days	
42	Manu Kumar Srivastava	28 February 2022	30 April 2023	1 year, 61 days	
43	Manoj Saunik	30 April 2023	1 January 2024	246 days	
44	Dr. Nitin Kareer	1 January 2024	30 June 2024	181 days	
45	Mrs.Sujata Saunik	1 July 2024	30 June 2025	364 days	
46	Rajesh Kumar Meena	1 July 2025	30 November 2025	152 days	
47	Rajesh Aggarwal	1 December 2025	Incumbent	280 days	

== See also ==
- List of chief secretaries of Mizoram
