= Rajesh Aggarwal =

Chief Secretary of Maharashtra

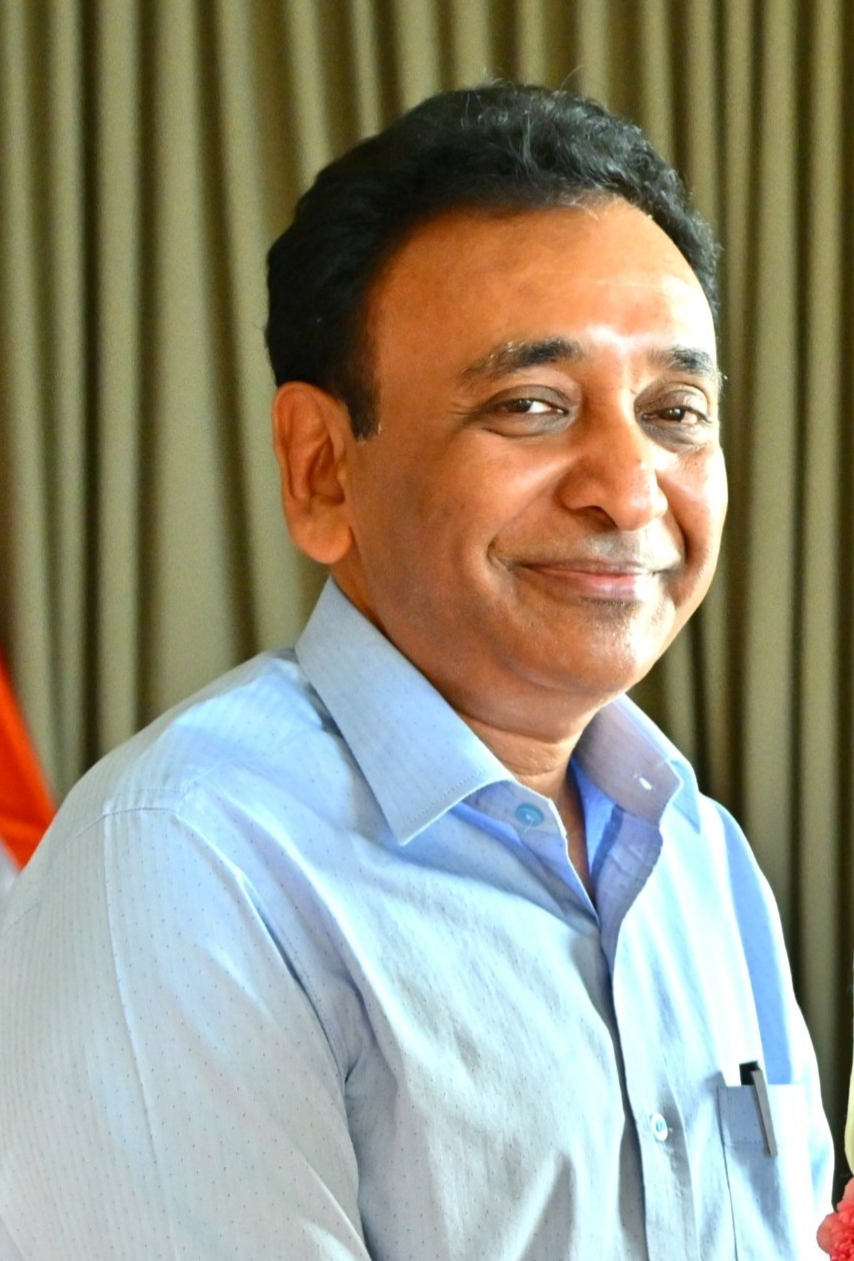
- Formal portrait, c. 2025

Chief Secretary, Government of Maharashtra
- Incumbent
- Assumed office 1 December 2025
- Nominated by: Devendra Fadnavis
- Appointed by: Acharya Devvrat
- Preceded by: Rajesh Kumar Meena

Secretary of the Ministry of Social Justice and Empowerment Government of India
- In office August 2022 – November 2025
- Appointed by: Appointments Committee of the Cabinet
- Preceded by: Anjali Bhawra
- Succeeded by: V. Vidyavathi

Secretary of the Ministry of Skill Development and Entrepreneurship Government of India
- In office September 2021 – August 2022
- Appointed by: Appointments Committee of the Cabinet
- Preceded by: Praveen Kumar
- Succeeded by: Atul Kumar Tiwari

Personal details
- Born: 12 November 1966 (age 59) Jalandhar, Punjab, India
- Education: (B.Tech) IIT Delhi
- Occupation: Bureaucrat
- Employer: Indian Administrative Service

Rajesh Aggarwal (born 12 November 1966) is a 1989 batch IAS officer from the Maharashtra cadre and is currently serving as the Chief Secretary of Maharashtra since 1 December 2025. He previously served as Secretary of Ministry of Social Justice and Empowerment and as the Secretary of Ministry of Skill Development and Entrepreneurship in the Central Government of India.

== Early life and education ==
Rajesh Aggarwal was born on 12 November 1966 in Jalandhar, India. He completed his B.Tech degree in Computer Science and Engineering from IIT Delhi in 1987.
