= Iqbal Singh Chahal =

Former Municipal Commissioner of Mumbai

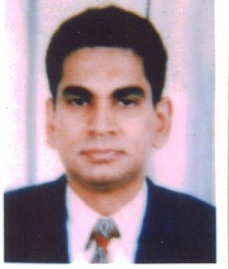
- Born: 20 January 1966 (age 60)
- Education: Thapar Institute of Engineering and Technology (B.E. ECE)
- Occupation: Retired IAS officer
- Organization(s): Government of Maharashtra, India
- Notable work: COVID-19 Management in Mumbai

Iqbal Singh Chahal (born 20 January 1966) is a retired 1989 batch IAS officer of Maharashtra cadre. A native of VPO 12-Z village of Sri Ganganagar , Rajasthan ; he graduated with a Bachelor of Engineering (B.E.) in Electronics and Communication Engineering (ECE) from Thapar Institute of Engineering and Technology, Patiala in 1987, before joining the IAS in 1989.

He is the former Municipal Commissioner and Administrator of Brihanmumbai Municipal Corporation (BMC) and is former Additional Chief Secretary in the Maharashtra Chief Minister's office. Prior to this, Chahal has served Government of Maharashtra and India in various capacities. In 2021, he was awarded an honorary degree of Doctor of Science (Honoris Causa) honorary doctorate by his alma mater, Thapar Institute of Engineering and Technology (TIET), during a special convocation at its Patiala campus for his role in handling the Covid-19 crisis in Mumbai. In his initial career he was collector of Thane and Chatrapati Sambhajinagar districts, later on he was Joint Secretary in Ministry of Home Affairs, Ministry of Women & Child Development and Ministry of Panchayati Raj. Following that he was also Principal Secretary in Water Resources Department and Urban Development Department of Maharashtra. Post retirement, he is serving as the Chairman of the Mumbai Police Housing Township Project for a period of five years.

== Work ==
Chahal is widely given the credit for keeping COVID-19 under check in Mumbai. Supreme Court of India and High Court of Bombay also lauded Chahal for his Mumbai Model.

He added thousands of beds through new field hospitals, and private facilities handed over their COVID-19 wards to the government with 800 vehicles being turned into ambulances. A proactive approach was used to focus on 55 slums including, Dharavi, where a strict lock-down was accompanied by aggressive sanitation of public toilets, mass coronavirus screening and a huge volunteer effort to ensure that nobody went hungry. All positive test reports in Mumbai were routed through "war rooms".

He received Newsmakers Achievers Awards in 2021.
