= List of chief secretaries of Mizoram =

Chief Secretary of Mizoram of Government of Mizoram

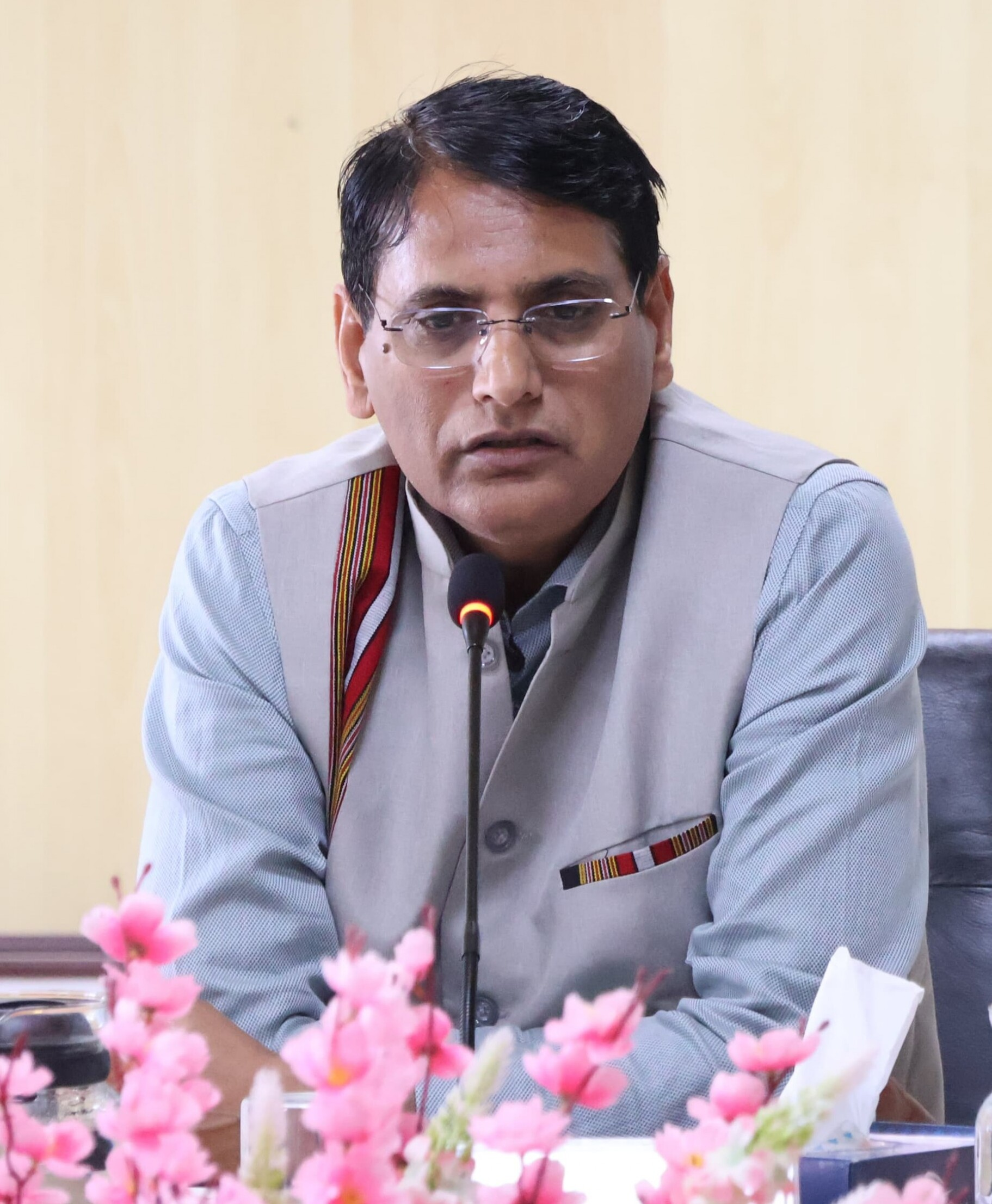
- Incumbent; Khilli Ram Meena since 21 November 2024
- Appointer: Chief Minister of Mizoram
- First holder: R.M. Agrawal

The Chief Secretary of Mizoram is the top-most executive official and senior-most civil servant of the State of Mizoram in India. The Chief Secretary is the ex-officio head of the state Civil Services Board, the State Secretariat, the state cadre Indian Administrative Service and all civil services under the rules of business of the state government. The Chief Secretary acts as an ex-officio secretary to the state cabinet, therefore called "Secretary to the Cabinet". The Chief Secretary acts as the principal advisor to the chief minister on all matters of state administration.

The Chief Secretary is chosen by the state's Chief Minister. State Chief Secretaries are IAS officers generally equivalent in rank to a Secretary to Government of India and are placed 23rd on Indian Order of Precedence.

== History ==
The present area of Mizoram was annexed by the British Empire after the Chin-Lushai Expedition of 1889–90. The North Lushai hills were administered by a political officer stationed at Fort Aijal under the Assam Government. The South Lushai Hills were under the administration of a political officer stationed at Fort Treager. This political officer reported to the commissioner of Chittagong who was under the Bengal Government.

In 1898, the two districts were merged into the Lushai Hills District which was administered by a Superintendent. It was regarded as an Excluded Area, beyond the Inner Line, which meant that the laws and regulations of the province did not apply, and the people from the plains could not access it without a permit. Even as self-government was gradually implemented in British India through Government of India Act 1919 & 1935, the district was placed outside the purview of these acts. The Superintendent remained the sole authority of the District.

After independence, the district became an autonomous district under the Sixth Schedule. After the Mizo Uprising, the Mizo District became the Union Territory of Mizoram in 1972. Hence, R.M. Aggarwal was appointed as the first Chief Secretary of Mizoram.

During the Mizoram Insurgency in 1975, following the assassination of Inspector General of Police G.S. Arya along with two other senior police officers by MNF insurgents, the centre enforced a countermeasure policy wherein an army officer, Brig. G.S. Randhawa was appointed as Inspector General of Police. Additionally, the incumbent Chief Secretary, R.M. Aggarwal, was replaced with the serving Inspector General of Jammu and Kashmir Police, Surendra Nath. This event marked the first and only instance wherein an Indian Police Service officer was appointed to the post of Chief Secretary in India.

== Chief secretaries ==
No.	Name	Took office	Left office
1	R.M. Agrawal, IAS	16 January 1972	17 March 1975
2	Surendra Nath, IPS	18 March 1975	3 December 1978
3	A.J. Kundan, IAS	4 December 1978	8 September 1981
4	A.H. Scott, IFAS	9 September 1981	15 July 1984
5	Lalkhama, IAS	16 July 1984	14 July 1987
6	Rohmingthanga, IAS	11 August 1987	13 September 1988
7	Lalkhama, IAS	14 September 1988	20 September 1989
8	Lalmanzuala, IAS	3 October 1989	23 August 1990
9	F. Pahnuna, IAS	23 August 1990	21 August 1993
10	Lalfak Zuala, IAS	21 August 1993	2 December 1998
11	Haukhum Hauzel, IAS	3 December 1998	31 January 1999
12	H.V. Lalringa, IAS	1 February 1999	31 July 2005
13	Haukhum Hauzel, IAS	1 August 2005	20 January 2009
14	Vanhela Pachuau, IAS	20 January 2009	31 August 2012
15	L Tochhawng, IAS	31 August 2012	1 November 2014
16	Lalmalsawma, IAS	1 November 2014	28 February 2018
17	Arvind Ray, IAS	2018	2019
18	Lalnunmawia Chuaungo, IAS	12 March 2019	31 October 2021
19	Renu Sharma, IAS	2 November 2021	2 November 2024
20	Khilli Ram Meena, IAS	28 November 2024	Incumbent

== See also ==
- British rule in the Lushai Hills
- Chief secretary (India)
- Indian Administrative Service
