= Chief secretary (India) =

List of Chief Secretaries in the Indian states

Chief Secretary of the State
- Emblem of India

- Flag of India
- State Secretariat
- Status: Head of Permanent Executive
- Abbreviation: CS
- Member of: State Civil Services Board (Note: As chairman.); Committee of Secretaries of the state on Administration; State Crisis Management Committee; Senior Selection Board
- Reports to: Governor of the State; Chief Minister of the State; State Cabinet; State Legislative Assembly
- Seat: State Secretariat
- Appointer: Appointments Committee of the Cabinet; The Chief Secretary is usually the senior most IAS officer of the senior most batch in the state. The appointee for the office is approved by state Chief Minister, based on appointee's ability and strong confidence with him or her.
- Term length: No fixed tenure is imposed on the office but term can be extended.
- Succession: 23rd (on the Indian order of precedence)
- Salary: ₹225,000 (US$2,300) monthly

The Chief Secretary is the highest-ranking executive official and civil servant of the government of an Indian state. The Chief Secretary is the ex-officio head of the state Civil Services Board, the State Secretariat, the state cadre Indian Administrative Service and all civil services under the rules of business of the state government. The Chief Secretary acts as the principal advisor to the chief minister on all matters of state administration.

The Chief Secretary is an officer of the Indian Administrative Service. The Chief Secretary is the senior-most cadre post in the state administration, ranking 23rd on the Indian order of precedence. The Chief Secretary acts as an ex-officio secretary to the state cabinet, therefore called "Secretary to the Cabinet". The status of this post is equal to that of a Secretary to the Government of India.

== History ==
The position of Chief Secretary dates back to the colonial era during British rule in India and has evolved considerably since then. It was introduced by the British Colonial Government, replacing the previous system where the highest administrative officer in the provinces was known as the "Secretary to Government." The Chief Secretary, originally referred to as the "Secretary to the Government of the Province," was a senior bureaucrat who served as the main link between the British government and the provincial administration. This officer was responsible for overseeing the daily workings of the government machinery, advising the provincial governor, and implementing the policies of the colonial administration.

During the British period, the Chief Secretary was typically a senior Imperial Civil Service (ICS) officer, a position largely dominated by the British until India gained independence in 1947. The Chief Secretary was seen as the head of the administration at the provincial level and reported directly to the Governor or Lieutenant Governor.

The salary of Chief Secretary of United Provinces of Agra and Oudh, Punjab and Burma was fixed and was same to Joint Secretary to Government of India during the British Raj. (Note: As per published records and the book named "The India List and India Office List 1905" as published by India Office and India Office Records.) As per Warrant or Precedence of 1905, Secretary to Government of India was listed together with Joint Secretary to Government of India and was ranked above the rank of Chief Secretary.

== States ==
Chief Secretaries are members of the Indian Administrative Service (IAS) who are the administrative head of state governments. A Chief Secretary functions as the central point of interdepartmental coordination at the departmental level and is classified as being in the Apex Grade. Chief Secretary is considered to be 'a linchpin' in the administration. Chief Secretary of the state also acts as the ex-officio Chairman of the State Civil Service Board, which recommends transfer/postings of officers of All India Services and State Civil Services in the state.

Traditionally, the most senior IAS officer within a state is chosen as the Chief Secretary; however, there are exceptions.

Chief Secretaries are assisted by Additional Chief Secretaries or Special Chief Secretaries, depending on the state, and Principal Secretaries, who are the administrative heads of departments they are assigned to.

Chief Secretaries are chosen by the state's Chief Minister. State Chief Secretaries are IAS officers generally equivalent in rank to a Secretary to Government of India and are placed 23rd on Indian Order of Precedence.

The post of Chief Secretary of a State Government is equivalent to senior three-star rank officers in the armed forces who are in the C-in-C (Commanding-in-Chief) grade or vice chiefs of staff, holding the rank of Lieutenant General or equivalent rank in the Indian Armed Forces, and are listed as such in the Order of Precedence.

List of current Chief Secretaries in the States of India
S.No.	State	Capital	List	Chief Secretary	Batch
1	Andhra Pradesh	Amaravati		G. Sai Prasad, IAS	1991
2	Arunachal Pradesh	Itanagar		Manish Meshram, IAS	1991
3	Assam	Dispur	List	Ravi Kota, IAS	1993
4	Bihar	Patna		Pratyaya Amrit, IAS	1991
5	Chhattisgarh	Raipur		Vikas Devangan, IAS	1994
6	Goa	Panaji		V. Candavelou, IAS	1997
7	Gujarat	Gandhinagar		Manoj Kumar Das, IAS	1990
8	Haryana	Chandigarh		Anurag Rastogi, IAS	1990
9	Himachal Pradesh	Shimla		Kamlesh Kumar (additional charge), IAS	1993
10	Jharkhand	Ranchi	List	Avinash Kumar, IAS	1993
11	Karnataka	Bengaluru		Shalini Rajneesh, IAS	1989
12	Kerala	Thiruvananthapuram		Bishwanath Sinha, IAS	1992
13	Madhya Pradesh	Bhopal		Ashok Munda, IAS	1991
14	Maharashtra	Mumbai	List	Rajesh Aggarwal, IAS	1989
15	Manipur	Imphal	List	Rajeev Gavara , IAS	1995
16	Meghalaya	Shillong		Dr. Shakeel P. Ahammed, IAS	1995
17	Mizoram	Aizawl	List	Khilli Ram Meena, IAS	1993
18	Nagaland	Kohima		Sentiyanger Imchen, IAS	1991
19	Odisha	Bhubaneswar		Anu Garg, IAS	1991
20	Punjab	Chandigarh		K. A. Prasad Sinha, IAS	1992
21	Rajasthan	Jaipur	List	Voruganti Srinivas, IAS	1989
22	Sikkim	Gangtok		Ravindra Telang, IAS	1995
23	Tamil Nadu	Chennai	List	M. Sai Kumar, IAS	1990
24	Telangana	Hyderabad		Sanjay Jaju, IAS	1992
25	Tripura	Agartala		Jitendra Kumar Sinha, IAS	1996
26	Uttar Pradesh	Lucknow		Shashi Prakash Goyal, IAS	1989
27	Uttarakhand	Dehradun	List	Anand Bardhan, IAS	1992
28	West Bengal	Kolkata		Manoj Kumar Agarwal, IAS	1990

== Union territories ==
In the union territories, which are governed by Administrators, Chief Secretaries are absent. In these territories an Adviser to the Administrator is appointed by the Union Government. However, the union territories of Delhi, Jammu and Kashmir and Puducherry, which have been granted partial statehood, do have Chief Secretaries. In Delhi, Jammu and Kashmir and Puducherry, the Chief Minister chooses the Chief Secretary and is appointed by the Lieutenant Governor.

Chief Secretaries and Advisers to the Administrators of Union territories, in general, are junior in rank compared to the Chief Secretaries of the States. The office bearers generally are of the rank Joint Secretary to Government of India and its equivalents. However, in Delhi and Chandigarh, the topmost civil servant is either of the ranks of Secretary to Government of India and its equivalents or Additional Secretary to Government of India and its equivalents.

List of current Chief Secretaries/Advisor to Administrators of Union territories
S. no	Union territory	Capital	Chief Secretary/Advisor to Administrator	Batch
1	Andaman and Nicobar Islands	Port Blair	Gyanesh Bharti, IAS	1998
2	Chandigarh	Chandigarh	Rajesh Prasad, IAS	1995
3	Dadra and Nagar Haveli and Daman and Diu	Daman	Ankur Garg, IAS	2003
4	Delhi	New Delhi	Rajeev Verma, IAS	1992
5	Jammu and Kashmir	Srinagar (May–Oct) and Jammu (Nov–Apr)	Dr. Sajjan Singh, IAS	1995
6	Ladakh	Leh	Ashish Kundra, IAS	1996
7	Lakshadweep	Kavaratti	S. B. Deepak Kumar, IAS	2005
8	Puducherry	Pondicherry	Sharat Chauhan, IAS	1994

== Additional Chief Secretary ==
Additional Chief Secretary is a senior administrative position in the state governments of India, held by an officer of the Indian Administrative Service (IAS). The rank is above that of a Principal Secretary and below the Chief Secretary, who is the topmost civil servant in the state. Officers serving as Additional Chief Secretaries are usually in charge of key departments such as Home, Finance, Revenue, or Industries. They are responsible for overseeing the implementation of government policies and programs, and they report to the Chief Secretary and the political executive, including the Chief Minister and relevant ministers.

The position is equivalent in rank to a Special Secretary to the Government of India, and the pay structure is the same as that of a Chief Secretary.

== See also ==
- List of chief secretaries of Assam
- List of chief secretaries of Maharashtra
- List of Chief Secretaries of Tamil Nadu
- List of chief secretaries of Mizoram
- List of chief secretaries of Jharkhand
- Cabinet Secretary of India
- Secretary to Government of India
- Joint Secretary to Government of India
- Principal Secretary
- Head of Forest Forces
- Director General of Police
- Advocate General
- Indian Forest Service
- Indian Administrative Service
- Indian Police Service
- List of chief secretaries of Uttarakhand

== Bibliography ==
- Laxmikanth, M. (2014). Governance in India (2nd ed.). Noida: McGraw Hill Education. ISBN 978-9339204785.
- Maheshwari, S.R. (2001). Indian Administration (6th ed.). New Delhi: Orient Blackswan Private Ltd. ISBN 9788125019886.
