= Andheri Assembly constituency =

Former constituency of the Maharashtra legislative assembly in India

Coordinates: 19.124°N 72.851°E

Andheri
- Former constituency for the Maharashtra Legislative Assembly

Constituency details
- Country: India
- Region: Western India
- State: Maharashtra
- Established: 1962
- Abolished: 2008

Andheri Vidhan Sabha seat was one of the constituencies of Maharashtra Legislative Assembly, in India. Andheri seat existed until the 2004 elections after which it became defunct when the map of constituencies in India was redrawn. In 2008, two new Vidhan Sabha seats (Andheri East and Andheri West) were created covering this area.

== Members of Vidhan Sabha ==
Year	Member	Party
From 1952 -1957 see: Vile Parle Andheri Versova
1952	Shantilal Harjivan Shah	Indian National Congress
From 1957 - 1967 see: Parle Andheri
1957	Shantilal Harjivan Shah	Indian National Congress
1962	Shantilal Harjivan Shah	Indian National Congress
1967	V. G. Rawal	Indian National Congress
1972	Ramnath Pandey	Indian National Congress
1978	Nilkant Samant	Janata Party
1980	Chandrakant Tripathi	Indian National Congress (I)
1985	Ramesh Dube	Indian National Congress
1990	Ramesh Dube	Indian National Congress
1995	Sitaram Dalvi	Shiv Sena
1999	Suresh Shetty	Indian National Congress
2004	Suresh Shetty	Indian National Congress
2008 onwards: See Andheri East & Andheri West

== Election results ==
=== Assembly Election 2004 ===
2004 Maharashtra Legislative Assembly election : Andheri
Party	Candidate	Votes	%	±%
INC	Suresh Shetty	96,514	47.98%	▼2.64
SS	Ravindra Dattaram Waikar	87,445	43.47%	▲1.74
SP	Pasi Kashinath(Kaka)	11,198	5.57%	New
BSP	Ramesh Sufer Rajbhar	2,649	1.32%	▲0.87
Margin of victory		9,069	4.51%	▼4.38
Turnout		2,01,163	52.78%	▲7.49
Total valid votes		2,01,156		
Registered electors		3,81,142		▲8.43
INC hold		Swing	▼2.64	

=== Assembly Election 1999 ===
1999 Maharashtra Legislative Assembly election : Andheri
Party	Candidate	Votes	%	±%
INC	Suresh Shetty	80,588	50.62%	▲18.37
SS	Sitaram Bhikaji Dalvi Aaba	66,431	41.73%	▼3.81
JD(S)	Adv. Vashi Manubhai Pragji	6,781	4.26%	New
CPI(M)	Adv. Bhojgar Chandrakant	2,313	1.45%	New
Margin of victory		14,157	8.89%	▼4.40
Turnout		1,62,490	46.23%	▼15.94
Total valid votes		1,59,193		
Registered electors		3,51,514		▲9.43
INC gain from SS		Swing	▲5.08	

=== Assembly Election 1995 ===
1995 Maharashtra Legislative Assembly election : Andheri
Party	Candidate	Votes	%	±%
SS	Sitaram Bhikaji Dalvi Aaba	89,566	45.54%	▲1.90
INC	Ramesh Dubey	63,425	32.25%	▼12.11
JD	Hegde M. J.	32,212	16.38%	▲6.30
SP	Sumant Mohan Mishra	2,771	1.41%	New
JP	Singh Sanjay Sitalaprasad	2,008	1.02%	▲0.79
IUML	Adv. Syed Amanulla Mahaboob	1,548	0.79%	New
Margin of victory		26,141	13.29%	▲12.57
Turnout		2,00,042	62.28%	▲7.58
Total valid votes		1,96,671		
Registered electors		3,21,217		▲22.74
SS gain from INC		Swing	▲1.18	

=== Assembly Election 1990 ===
1990 Maharashtra Legislative Assembly election : Andheri
Party	Candidate	Votes	%	±%
INC	Ramesh Dubey	62,276	44.36%	▼9.18
SS	More Ramesh Shankar	61,264	43.64%	New
JD	Solanki Veersen	14,145	10.08%	New
Margin of victory		1,012	0.72%	▼31.32
Turnout		1,41,880	54.22%	▲8.21
Total valid votes		1,40,384		
Registered electors		2,61,697		▲34.46
INC hold		Swing	▼9.18	

=== Assembly Election 1985 ===
1985 Maharashtra Legislative Assembly election : Andheri
Party	Candidate	Votes	%	±%
INC	Ramesh Dubey	47,346	53.54%	New
JP	M. P. Vashi	19,013	21.50%	▲12.03
Independent	Sheikh Noor Hasan	7,945	8.99%	New
Independent	Ayyadurai	6,266	7.09%	New
LKD	Vasantrao Baburao Shinde	3,812	4.31%	New
Independent	Neelkanth Samant	1,060	1.20%	New
Independent	H. R. Khan	1,022	1.16%	New
Margin of victory		28,333	32.04%	▲6.32
Turnout		89,823	46.15%	▲16.96
Total valid votes		88,425		
Registered electors		1,94,623		▲20.90
INC gain from INC(I)		Swing	▼1.16	

=== Assembly Election 1980 ===
1980 Maharashtra Legislative Assembly election : Andheri
Party	Candidate	Votes	%	±%
INC(I)	Chandarkant Tripathi	25,073	54.70%	▲32.25
BJP	Neelkanth Samant	13,283	28.98%	New
JP	Basista Narayan Singh	4,340	9.47%	▼35.32
CPI	Deshmukh Shiwaji Baburao	1,288	2.81%	New
[[Janata Party (Secular) Charan Singh|Janata Party (Secular) Charan Singh]]	Solanki Virsen Balavantsingh	1,192	2.60%	New
Independent	Siyaram Kalauji	355	0.77%	New
Margin of victory		11,790	25.72%	▲3.38
Turnout		46,364	28.80%	▼29.25
Total valid votes		45,838		
Registered electors		1,60,980		▲10.74
INC(I) gain from JP		Swing	▲9.91	

=== Assembly Election 1978 ===
1978 Maharashtra Legislative Assembly election : Andheri
Party	Candidate	Votes	%	±%
JP	Nilkant Samant	37,585	44.79%	New
INC(I)	Sharma C. M.	18,838	22.45%	New
INC	Ramnath Pandey	11,558	13.77%	▼36.70
SS	Kisan Waghmare	8,322	9.92%	▼8.52
Independent	Hegde Mudalkatte Jagannath	4,919	5.86%	New
Independent	Carwalo Leo Janorious	1,410	1.68%	New
Independent	Madadik Shankar Ramchandra	704	0.84%	New
Margin of victory		18,747	22.34%	▼9.70
Turnout		85,465	58.79%	▼2.65
Total valid votes		83,914		
Registered electors		1,45,364		▼7.15
JP gain from INC		Swing	▼5.68	

=== Assembly Election 1972 ===
1972 Maharashtra Legislative Assembly election : Andheri
Party	Candidate	Votes	%	±%
INC	Ramanath Mahavir Pandey	47,710	50.47%	▲13.13
SS	Raginwar Rajeswar Waman	17,427	18.44%	New
CPI	Balkrishna S. Dhome	12,681	13.42%	New
INC(O)	Vasudev Gulabram Rawal	11,359	12.02%	New
Margin of victory		30,283	32.04%	▲30.37
Turnout		96,651	61.74%	▲0.21
Total valid votes		94,527		
Registered electors		1,56,556		▲42.62
INC hold		Swing	▲13.13	

=== Assembly Election 1967 ===
1967 Maharashtra Legislative Assembly election : Andheri
Party	Candidate	Votes	%	±%
INC	V. G. Rawal	24,666	37.35%	New
Independent	B. S. Bhume	23,565	35.68%	New
PSP	B. S. Patil	11,151	16.88%	New
ABJS	H. V. Sawe	4,139	6.27%	New
SWA	M. K. Damley	2,525	3.82%	New
Margin of victory		1,101	1.67%	
Turnout		68,945	62.81%	
Total valid votes		66,046		
Registered electors		1,09,771		
INC win (new seat)				

=== Assembly Election 1962 ===
1962 Maharashtra Legislative Assembly election : Parle Andheri
Party	Candidate	Votes	%	±%
INC	Shantilal Harijivan Shah	34,349	46.23%	New
CPI	Balkrishana Shantaram Dhume	29,127	39.20%	New
ABJS	Sureshchandra Gendalal Cheturvedi	7,916	10.65%	New
Socialist Party (India)	Tulsidas Dayalji Boda	2,916	3.92%	New
Margin of victory		5,222	7.03%	
Turnout		77,369	64.91%	
Total valid votes		74,308		
Registered electors		1,19,190		
INC win (new seat)				

== See also ==
- List of constituencies of Maharashtra Legislative Assembly
