= Mumbai North West Lok Sabha constituency =

Constituency of the Indian parliament in Maharashtra

Coordinates: 19.14°N 72.86°E

Mumbai North West Lok Sabha
- Lok Sabha constituency
- Interactive Map Outlining Mumbai North West Lok Sabha Constituency

Constituency details
- Country: India
- Region: Western India
- State: Maharashtra
- Assembly constituencies: Jogeshwari East; Dindoshi; Goregaon; Versova; Andheri West; Andheri East
- Established: 1982
- Total electors: 17,35,088(2024)
- Reservation: None

Member of Parliament
- 18th Lok Sabha
- Incumbent Ravindra Waikar
- Party: SHS
- Alliance: NDA
- Elected year: 2024
- Preceded by: Gajanan Kirtikar

Mumbai North West Lok Sabha constituency is a constituency represented in the Lok Sabha of the Parliament of India, having approximately 1.6 million voters.

== Assembly segments ==
Presently, Mumbai North West constituency comprises six Vidhan Sabha (Legislative Assembly) segments. These segments are:

#	Name	District	Member	Party	Leading (in 2024)
158	Jogeshwari East	Mumbai Suburban	Anant Nar	SS(UBT)	SS(UBT)
159	Dindoshi	Mumbai Suburban	Sunil Prabhu	SS(UBT)	SS(UBT)
163	Goregaon	Mumbai Suburban	Vidya Thakur	BJP	SHS
164	Versova	Mumbai Suburban	Haroon Khan	SS(UBT)	SS(UBT)
165	Andheri West	Mumbai Suburban	Ameet Satam	BJP	SHS
166	Andheri East	Mumbai Suburban	Murji Patel	SHS	SHS

== Members of Parliament ==
Year	Name	Party
1967	Shantilal Shah	Indian National Congress
1971	H. R. Gokhale	Indian National Congress
1977	Ram Jethmalani	Janata Party
1980	Ram Jethmalani	Janata Party
1984	Sunil Dutt	Indian National Congress
1989	Sunil Dutt	Indian National Congress
1991	Sunil Dutt	Indian National Congress
1996	Madhukar Sarpotdar	Shiv Sena
1998	Madhukar Sarpotdar	Shiv Sena
1999	Sunil Dutt	Indian National Congress
2004	Sunil Dutt	Indian National Congress
2005^	Priya Dutt	Indian National Congress
2009	Gurudas Kamat	Indian National Congress
2014	Gajanan Kirtikar	Shiv Sena
2019	Gajanan Kirtikar	Shiv Sena
2024	Ravindra Waikar	Shiv Sena

^ -bypoll

== Election results ==
=== General election 2024 ===
2024 Indian general election: Mumbai North West
Party	Candidate	Votes	%	±%
SHS	Ravindra Waikar	452,644	47.40	▼13.15
SS(UBT)	Amol Kirtikar	452,596	47.39	New entry
NOTA	None of the Above	15,161	1.59	▼0.35
Margin of victory		48	0.01	▼27.64
Turnout		955,050	55.04	▲0.67
SHS hold		Swing		

=== General election 2019 ===
2019 Indian general election: Mumbai North West
Party	Candidate	Votes	%	±%
SS	Gajanan Kirtikar	570,063	60.55	▲8.78
INC	Sanjay Nirupam	309,735	32.90	▲1.52
VBA	Suresh Shetty	23,367	2.49	New entry
NOTA	None of the above	18,225	1.94	
Margin of victory		260,328	27.65	
Turnout		941,831	54.37	
SS hold		Swing		

=== General election 2014 ===
2014 Indian general election: Mumbai North West
Party	Candidate	Votes	%	±%
SS	Gajanan Kirtikar	464,820	51.77	▲21.29
INC	Gurudas Kamat	281,792	31.38	▼4.53
MNS	Mahesh Manjrekar	66,088	7.36	▼10.18
AAP	Mayank Gandhi	51,860	5.78	New entry
NOTA	None of the above	11,009	1.23	N/A
Margin of victory		183,028	20.39	▲14.96
Turnout		895,517	50.44	▲6.39
SS gain from INC		Swing		

=== General election 2009 ===
2009 Indian general election: Mumbai North West
Party	Candidate	Votes	%	±%
INC	Gurudas Kamat	253,920	35.91	▼28.54
SS	Gajanan Kirtikar	215,533	30.48	▼3.4
MNS	Shalini Thackeray	124,000	17.54	New entry
SP	Abu Azmi	84,412	11.94	N/A
Margin of victory		38,387	5.44	▼26.49
Turnout		707,134	44.05	▲11.27
INC hold		Swing		

=== By election 2005 ===
By Election, November 2005: Mumbai North West
Party	Candidate	Votes	%	±%
INC	Priya Dutt	346,294	64.45	▲12.86
SS	Madhukar Sarpotdar	174,750	32.52	▼12.74
Margin of victory		171,544	31.93	▲25.60
Turnout		537,317	32.78	▼16.55
INC hold		Swing		

=== General election 2004 ===
2004 Indian general election: Mumbai North West
Party	Candidate	Votes	%	±%
INC	Sunil Dutt	385,755	51.59	▼0.76
SS	Sanjay Nirupam	338,397	45.26	▲5.12
Margin of victory		47,358	6.33	▼5.88
Turnout		747,730	49.33	▲3.38
INC hold		Swing		

=== General election 1999 ===
1999 Indian general election: Mumbai North West
Party	Candidate	Votes	%	±%
INC	Sunil Dutt	366,669	52.35	
SS	Madhukar Sarpotdar	281,130	40.14	
NCP	Ramesh Dube	41,947	5.99	
Margin of victory		85,539	12.21	
Turnout		713,586		
INC gain from SS		Swing		

=== General election 1998 ===
1998 Indian general election: Mumbai North West
Party	Candidate	Votes	%	±%
SS	Madhukar Sarpotdar	370,229	47.47	
SP	Tushar Gandhi	3,50,994	45.00	
JD	Aftab Ahmad Khan	28,407	3.64	
Margin of victory		19,235	2.47	
Turnout		779,950	51.68	
SS hold		Swing		

=== General election 1996 ===
1996 Indian general election: Mumbai North West
Party	Candidate	Votes	%	±%
SS	Madhukar Sarpotdar	321,107	45.40	
INC	Nirmala Samant Prabhavalkar	232,638	32.89	
SP	Akhtar Rizvi	124,290	17.57	
Margin of victory		88,469	12.51	
Turnout		707,215	47.10	
SS gain from INC		Swing		

=== General election 1991 ===
1991 Indian general election: Bombay North West
Party	Candidate	Votes	%	±%
INC	Sunil Dutt	267,342	50.78	
SS	Ramesh Prabhoo	210,597	40.00	
JD	Anees Syed	37,850	7.19	
Margin of victory		56,745	10.78	
Turnout		526,490	42.60	
INC hold		Swing		

=== General election 1989 ===
1989 Indian general election: Bombay North West
Party	Candidate	Votes	%	±%
INC	Sunil Dutt	316,203	46.09	
BJP	Arun Sathe	243,629	35.51	
JD	Sharad Rao	112,691	16.43	
Margin of victory		72,574	10.58	
Turnout		686,003	56.86	
INC hold		Swing		

=== General election 1984 ===
1984 Indian general election: Bombay North West
Party	Candidate	Votes	%	±%
INC	Sunil Dutt	308,989	60.67	
BJP	Ram Jethmalani	154,349	30.31	
Independent	Ramanuj Upadhyay	36,291	7.13	
Margin of victory		154,640	30.36	
Turnout		509,312	58.88	
INC gain from JP		Swing		

=== General election 1980 ===
1980 Indian general election: Bombay North West
Party	Candidate	Votes	%	±%
JP	Ram Jethmalani	207,767	51.17	
INC	Ramrao Adik	180,712	44.51	
JP(S)	Bharat Parekh	10,960	2.70	
Margin of victory		27,055	6.66	
Turnout		406,042	49.96	
JP hold		Swing		

=== General election 1977 ===
1977 Indian general election: Bombay North West
Party	Candidate	Votes	%	±%
JP	Ram Jethmalani	246,446	61.09	
INC	H. R. Gokhale	152,947	37.91	
Margin of victory		93,499	23.18	
Turnout		403,409	63.52	
JP gain from INC		Swing		

=== General election 1971 ===
1971 Indian general election: Bombay North West
Party	Candidate	Votes	%	±%
INC	H. R. Gokhale	267,164	59.83	
INC(O)	Shanti Patel	162,271	36.34	
Independent	S. S. Wagle	12,170	2.73	
Margin of victory		104,893	23.49	
Turnout		446,516	60.86	
INC hold		Swing		

=== General election 1967 ===
1967 Indian general election: Bombay North West
Party	Candidate	Votes	%	±%
INC	Shantilal Shah	124,071	31.65	
Independent	H. R. Gokhale	122,707	31.31	
SWA	M Mehta	62,396	15.92	
ABJS	S. G. Chaturvedi	37,639	9.60	
PSP	N. C. Bharucha	33,340	8.51	
Margin of victory		1,364	0.34	
Turnout		391,965	65.47	
INC win		Swing		

== See also ==
- List of constituencies of the Lok Sabha
- Mumbai
