= Andheri West Assembly constituency =

Constituency of the Maharashtra legislative assembly in India

Coordinates: 19.13°N 72.84°E

Andheri West
- Constituency No. 165 for the Maharashtra Legislative Assembly
- Ameet Satam, present MLA of Andheri west

Constituency details
- Country: India
- Region: Western India
- State: Maharashtra
- District: Mumbai Suburban
- Lok Sabha constituency: Mumbai North West
- Established: 2008
- Total electors: 288,139
- Reservation: None

Member of Legislative Assembly
- 15th Maharashtra Legislative Assembly
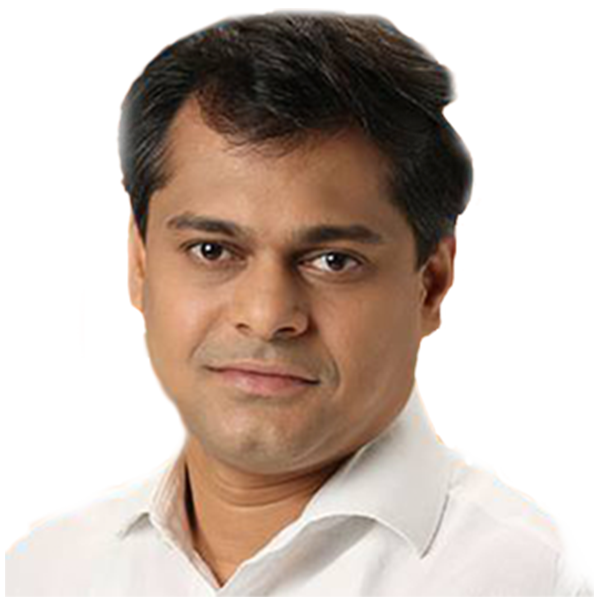
- Incumbent Ameet Bhaskar Satam
- Party: BJP
- Elected year: 2024

Andheri West Assembly constituency is one of the 26 Vidhan Sabha constituencies located in the Mumbai Suburban district.

== Overview ==
Andheri West is part of the Mumbai North West Lok Sabha constituency along with five other Vidhan Sabha segments, namely Goregaon, Versova, Jogeshwari East, Andheri East and Dindoshi in Mumbai Suburban district.

== Members of the Legislative Assembly ==
Year	Member	Party
From 1952 -1957 see: Vile Parle Andheri Versova
1952	Shantilal Harjivan Shah	Indian National Congress
From 1957 - 1967 see: Parle Andheri
1957	Shantilal Harjivan Shah	Indian National Congress
1962	Shantilal Harjivan Shah	Indian National Congress
1967	V. G. Rawal	Indian National Congress
1972	Ramnath Pandey	Indian National Congress
1978	Nilkant Samant	Janata Party
1980	Chandrakant Tripathi	Indian National Congress (I)
1985	Ramesh Dube	Indian National Congress
1990	Ramesh Dube	Indian National Congress
1995	Sitaram Dalvi	Shiv Sena
1999	Suresh Shetty	Indian National Congress
2004	Suresh Shetty	Indian National Congress
Till 2009 : See Andheri
2009	Ashok Jadhav	Indian National Congress
2014	Ameet Satam	Bharatiya Janata Party
2019	Ameet Satam	Bharatiya Janata Party
2024	Ameet Satam	Bharatiya Janata Party

== Election results ==
=== Assembly Election 2024 ===
2024 Maharashtra Legislative Assembly election : Andheri West
Party	Candidate	Votes	%	±%
BJP	Ameet Satam	84,981	55.40%	▲4.99
INC	Ashok Jadhav	65,382	42.62%	▲6.78
NOTA	None of the Above	1,822	1.19%	▼1.20
Independent	Arif Moinuddin Shaikh	1,527	1.00%	New
Margin of victory		19,599	12.78%	▼1.79
Turnout		1,55,224	53.87%	▲10.73
Total valid votes		1,53,402		
Registered electors		2,88,139		▼5.91
BJP hold		Swing	▲4.99	

=== Assembly Election 2019 ===
2019 Maharashtra Legislative Assembly election : Andheri West
Party	Candidate	Votes	%	±%
BJP	Ameet Satam	65,615	50.40%	▲8.91
INC	Ashok Jadhav	46,653	35.84%	▲11.24
AIMIM	Arif Moinuddin Shaikh	7,038	5.41%	▲2.72
MNS	Kishor Vishnu Rane	6,891	5.29%	▼3.83
NOTA	None of the Above	3,103	2.38%	▲1.35
CPI(M)	Narayanan Keshav Kidappil	2,772	2.13%	▲0.63
Margin of victory		18,962	14.57%	▼2.34
Turnout		1,33,299	43.53%	▼3.40
Total valid votes		1,30,176		
Registered electors		3,06,222		▼1.15
BJP hold		Swing	▲8.91	

=== Assembly Election 2014 ===
2014 Maharashtra Legislative Assembly election : Andheri West
Party	Candidate	Votes	%	±%
BJP	Ameet Satam	59,022	41.50%	New
INC	Ashok Jadhav	34,982	24.60%	▼24.71
SS	Jaywant Mahadev Parab	26,721	18.79%	▼4.05
MNS	Raiees Lashkaria	12,970	9.12%	▼5.89
AIMIM	M. A. Hussain	3,821	2.69%	New
CPI(M)	Narayan Bhai	2,138	1.50%	New
NOTA	None of the Above	1,467	1.03%	New
NCP	Alpana Dipak Painter	904	0.64%	New
Margin of victory		24,040	16.90%	▼9.57
Turnout		1,43,711	46.39%	▲3.59
Total valid votes		1,42,229		
Registered electors		3,09,772		▲7.93
BJP gain from INC		Swing	▼7.81	

=== Assembly Election 2009 ===
2009 Maharashtra Legislative Assembly election : Andheri West
Party	Candidate	Votes	%	±%
INC	Ashok Jadhav	59,899	49.30%	New
SS	Vishnu V. Korgaonkar (Maharaj)	27,741	22.83%	New
MNS	Raiees Lashkaria	18,236	15.01%	New
Independent	Hansel D'Souza	10,564	8.70%	New
SP	Chunawala Habib Abdul Latif	2,253	1.85%	New
Margin of victory		32,158	26.47%	
Turnout		1,21,495	42.33%	
Total valid votes		1,21,489		
Registered electors		2,87,021		
INC win (new seat)				
