= Malad Assembly constituency =

Constituency of the Maharashtra legislative assembly in India

Malad
- Former constituency for the Maharashtra Legislative Assembly

Constituency details
- Country: India
- Region: Western India
- State: Maharashtra
- Established: 1967
- Abolished: 2008
- Total electors: 586,916

Malad Assembly constituency was an assembly constituency in the India state of Maharashtra.

== Members of the Legislative Assembly ==
| Election | Member | Party |
|---|---|---|
| 1967 | D. S. Patel | Indian National Congress |
| 1972 | Mrinal Keshav Gore | Samyukta Socialist Party |
| 1978 | Kamal Desai | Janata Party |
| 1980 | Pandarale Ram Jankiram | Indian National Congress |
| 1985 | Datta (D. N. Chaulkar) | Indian National Congress |
| 1990 | Gajanan Kirtikar | Shiv Sena |
| 1995 | Gajanan Kirtikar | Shiv Sena |
| 1999 | Gajanan Kirtikar | Shiv Sena |
| 2004 | Gajanan Kirtikar | Shiv Sena |

== Election results ==
=== Assembly Election 2004 ===
2004 Maharashtra Legislative Assembly election : Malad
| Party | Candidate | Votes | % | ±% |
|---|---|---|---|---|
| SS | Gajanan Kirtikar | 143,082 | 48.51% | ▲6.46 |
| INC | Nirmala Samant Prabhavalkar | 129,292 | 43.83% | ▲6.12 |
| SP | Ashok Singh Yadav | 10,300 | 3.49% | New |
| BSP | Deepak Baba | 4,192 | 1.42% | ▲0.84 |
| Independent | Rajeshwar Singh | 3,166 | 1.07% | New |
| Margin of victory | | 13,790 | 4.68% | ▲0.34 |
| Turnout | | 294,959 | 50.24% | ▲6.07 |
| Registered electors | | 586,916 | | ▲14.54 |
| SS hold | | Swing | ▲6.46 | |

=== Assembly Election 1999 ===
1999 Maharashtra Legislative Assembly election : Malad
| Party | Candidate | Votes | % | ±% |
|---|---|---|---|---|
| SS | Gajanan Kirtikar | 95,224 | 42.05% | ▼14.12 |
| INC | Tarashankar Choube | 85,409 | 37.72% | ▲8.33 |
| NCP | Ram Pandagle | 33,995 | 15.01% | New |
| Margin of victory | | 9,815 | 4.33% | ▼22.46 |
| Turnout | | 226,438 | 42.51% | ▼12.94 |
| Registered electors | | 512,420 | | ▲11.76 |
| SS hold | | Swing | ▼14.12 | |

=== Assembly Election 1995 ===
1995 Maharashtra Legislative Assembly election : Malad
| Party | Candidate | Votes | % | ±% |
|---|---|---|---|---|
| SS | Gajanan Kirtikar | 147,148 | 56.18% | ▲11.75 |
| INC | Ram Pandagle | 76,976 | 29.39% | ▼9.93 |
| SP | G. G. Mahalkari | 11,050 | 4.22% | New |
| JD | Kilachand Yadav | 6,260 | 2.39% | ▼7.45 |
| BSP | Chandrakant Ragho Kamble | 4,061 | 1.55% | New |
| Independent | Raju Ashar | 2,008 | 0.77% | New |
| Margin of victory | | 70,172 | 26.79% | ▲21.68 |
| Turnout | | 261,937 | 56.09% | ▲4.83 |
| Registered electors | | 458,510 | | ▲32.56 |
| SS hold | | Swing | ▲11.75 | |

=== Assembly Election 1990 ===
1990 Maharashtra Legislative Assembly election : Malad
| Party | Candidate | Votes | % | ±% |
|---|---|---|---|---|
| SS | Gajanan Kirtikar | 80,364 | 44.43% | New |
| INC | Chandrakant Tripathi | 71,125 | 39.32% | ▼3.58 |
| JD | Kilachand Yadav | 17,808 | 9.84% | New |
| BRP | Gawai Laxman Dharmaji | 2,740 | 1.51% | New |
| DMM | Maqbool Ahmed Khan | 1,633 | 0.90% | New |
| Independent | Jha Bibash Chandra | 1,402 | 0.78% | New |
| Margin of victory | | 9,239 | 5.11% | ▼17.32 |
| Turnout | | 180,896 | 51.66% | ▲5.82 |
| Registered electors | | 345,892 | | ▲48.10 |
| SS gain from INC | | Swing | ▲1.53 | |

=== Assembly Election 1985 ===
1985 Maharashtra Legislative Assembly election : Malad
| Party | Candidate | Votes | % | ±% |
|---|---|---|---|---|
| INC | Datta (D. N. Chaulkar) | 46,565 | 42.90% | New |
| BJP | Premnath Sehgal | 22,220 | 20.47% | ▼8.22 |
| Independent | Kadam Harish Shivram | 19,098 | 17.59% | New |
| Independent | Laxman Gawade | 4,865 | 4.48% | New |
| LKD | Singh Hansraj Tilakdhari | 4,389 | 4.04% | New |
| Independent | Baburao Sakharam Tambe | 3,966 | 3.65% | New |
| Independent | Ahmed J. Saudagar | 3,802 | 3.50% | New |
| Margin of victory | | 24,345 | 22.43% | ▲7.53 |
| Turnout | | 108,554 | 45.62% | ▲14.02 |
| Registered electors | | 233,550 | | ▲45.26 |
| INC gain from INC(I) | | Swing | ▼0.69 | |

=== Assembly Election 1980 ===
1980 Maharashtra Legislative Assembly election : Malad
| Party | Candidate | Votes | % | ±% |
|---|---|---|---|---|
| INC(I) | Pandarale Ram Jankiram | 22,747 | 43.59% | ▲25.96 |
| BJP | Sehgal Prannath | 14,972 | 28.69% | New |
| JP | Gupte Baba Alias Shrinivas Bhaskar | 6,311 | 12.09% | ▼44.81 |
| [[Janata Party (Secular) Charan Singh|Janata Party (Secular) Charan Singh]] | Rajaram Yadav | 3,453 | 6.62% | New |
| INC(U) | Dilip Sripatrao Kadam | 3,442 | 6.60% | New |
| Independent | Singh Hansraj Tilakdhari | 453 | 0.87% | New |
| Margin of victory | | 7,775 | 14.90% | ▼24.37 |
| Turnout | | 52,187 | 32.04% | ▼26.17 |
| Registered electors | | 160,779 | | ▲13.08 |
| INC(I) gain from JP | | Swing | ▼13.31 | |

=== Assembly Election 1978 ===
1978 Maharashtra Legislative Assembly election : Malad
| Party | Candidate | Votes | % | ±% |
|---|---|---|---|---|
| JP | Kamal Desai | 47,429 | 56.90% | New |
| INC(I) | Joshi Mangelal Durga Prasad | 14,693 | 17.63% | New |
| SS | Raginwar Rajeshwar Waman | 12,470 | 14.96% | ▲9.07 |
| INC | Rane Murarrao Babaji | 4,863 | 5.83% | ▼32.82 |
| Independent | Sonawane C. K. | 2,260 | 2.71% | New |
| Margin of victory | | 32,736 | 39.27% | ▲36.24 |
| Turnout | | 83,355 | 57.47% | ▼7.59 |
| Registered electors | | 142,183 | | ▼9.02 |
| JP gain from SSP | | Swing | ▲15.22 | |

=== Assembly Election 1972 ===
1972 Maharashtra Legislative Assembly election : Malad
| Party | Candidate | Votes | % | ±% |
|---|---|---|---|---|
| SSP | Mrinal Keshav Gore | 43,133 | 41.68% | New |
| INC | M. V. Paranjape | 39,998 | 38.65% | ▲0.54 |
| SS | Sudha Madhavrao Churi | 6,098 | 5.89% | New |
| ABJS | Rampher Singh Chandrabali | 6,088 | 5.88% | ▼8.56 |
| INC(O) | Chandrakant R. Joshi | 3,721 | 3.60% | New |
| RPI | Manohar Radhoji Mokal | 1,636 | 1.58% | New |
| Margin of victory | | 3,135 | 3.03% | ▼6.33 |
| Turnout | | 103,479 | 64.77% | ▼1.77 |
| Registered electors | | 156,285 | | ▲33.95 |
| SSP gain from INC | | Swing | ▲3.57 | |

=== Assembly Election 1967 ===
1967 Maharashtra Legislative Assembly election : Malad
| Party | Candidate | Votes | % | ±% |
|---|---|---|---|---|
| INC | D. S. Patel | 30,228 | 38.11% | New |
| SSP | P. B. Samant | 22,802 | 28.75% | New |
| ABJS | C. Rampher Singh | 11,452 | 14.44% | New |
| PSP | K. B. Thanekar | 7,477 | 7.23% | New |
| SWA | V. V. Gokarna | 4,026 | 3.89% | New |
| Margin of victory | | 7,426 | 9.36% | |
| Turnout | | 79,316 | 65.13% | |
| Registered electors | | 116,670 | | |
| INC win (new seat) | | | | |
