= Ramesh Latke =

Indian politician (1970–2022)

Member of Legislative Assembly of Maharashtra
- In office 2014 – May 11, 2022
- Preceded by: Suresh Shetty
- Succeeded by: Rutuja Latke
- Constituency: Andheri East

Personal details
- Born: 21 April 1970 India
- Died: 11 May 2022 (aged 52) Dubai, United Arab Emirates
- Party: Shiv Sena

Ramesh Latke (21 April 1970 – 11 May 2022) was a Shiv Sena politician from Mumbai, Maharashtra. He was a member of the 14th Maharashtra Legislative Assembly representing Andheri East Assembly constituency of Mumbai, Maharashtra, India as a member of Shiv Sena.

== Positions held ==
- 1997: Elected as corporator in Brihanmumbai Municipal Corporation
- 2002: Elected as corporator in Brihanmumbai Municipal Corporation
- 2007: Elected as corporator in Brihanmumbai Municipal Corporation
- 2014: Elected to Maharashtra Legislative Assembly
- 2019: Elected to Maharashtra Legislative Assembly

== Family ==
He was married to Rutuja. After his death she contested the by election in 2022 from Andheri East Assembly constituency.

== See also ==
- Mumbai North West Lok Sabha constituency
