= Murji Patel =

Indian politician

Murji Patel (born 1972) is an Indian politician from Maharashtra. He is an MLA from Andheri East Assembly constituency in Mumbai Suburban district. He won the 2024 Maharashtra Legislative Assembly election representing the Shiv Sena.

== Early life and education ==
Patel is from Andheri, Mumbai Suburban district, Maharashtra. He is the son of Kanji Patel. He passed Class 8 in 1989 and while studying in Class 9 at Y.J.S. Gujarati Night High School, Tardeo, Mumbai, he discontinued his studies in 1990.

== Career ==
Patel won as an MLA for the first time from Andheri East Assembly constituency representing Shiv Sena in the 2024 Maharashtra Legislative Assembly election. He polled 94,010 votes and defeated his nearest rival, Rutuja Latke of the Shiv Sena (UBT), by a margin of 25,486 votes. He unsuccessfully contested as an independent candidate in the 2019 Maharashtra Legislative Assembly election and lost to Ramesh Latke of the Shiv Sena by a margin of 16,965 votes.
