= Anant Nar =

Indian politician

Anant B. Nar (born 1965) is an Indian politician from Maharashtra. He is an MLA from Jogeshwari East Assembly constituency in Mumbai Suburban district. He won the 2024 Maharashtra Legislative Assembly election representing the Shiv Sena (UBT).

== Early life and education ==
Nar is from Jogeshwari, Mumbai Suburban district, Maharashtra. He is the son of Bhiku Bhagsheth Nar. He passed Class 10 in 1984 at Bal Vikas Vidya Mandir, Jogeshwari, East Mumbai. Earlier, he served as a corporator from K-East ward in the Municipal Corporation of Greater Mumbai.

== Career ==
Nar won from Jogeshwari Assembly constituency representing Shiv Sena (UBT) in the 2024 Maharashtra Legislative Assembly election. He polled 77,044 votes and defeated his nearest rival, Manisha Ravindra Waikar of the Shiv Sena, by a margin of 1,541 votes. Manisha is the wife of former MLA and Mumbai North West MP Ravindra Waikar.
