= Andheri East Assembly constituency =

Indian constituency

Coordinates: 19.12°N 72.87°E

Andheri East
- Constituency No. 166 for the Maharashtra Legislative Assembly

Constituency details
- Country: India
- Region: Western India
- State: Maharashtra
- Division: Konkan
- District: Mumbai Suburban
- Lok Sabha constituency: Mumbai North West
- Established: 2008
- Total electors: 288,185
- Reservation: None

Member of Legislative Assembly
- 15th Maharashtra Legislative Assembly
- Incumbent Murji Patel
- Party: SHS
- Alliance: NDA
- Elected year: 2024

Andheri East Assembly constituency is one of the 26 Vidhan Sabha constituencies located in Mumbai Suburban district.

== Overview ==
It is a segment of the Mumbai North West Lok Sabha constituency along with five other Vidhan Sabha segments, namely Goregaon, Versova, Jogeshwari East, Dindoshi and Andheri West in Mumbai Suburban district.

== Members of the Legislative Assembly ==
Year	Member	Party
1978	Ramesh Sheth	Janata Party
1980	Hafiz Yusuf	Indian National Congress (I)
1985	Baldev Khosa	Indian National Congress
1990	Shantaram Ambre	Shiv Sena
1995	Shantaram Ambre	Shiv Sena
1999	Baldev Khosa	Indian National Congress
2004	Baldev Khosa	Indian National Congress
Until 2008: See Amboli
2009	Suresh Shetty	Indian National Congress
2014	Ramesh Latke	Shiv Sena
2019	Ramesh Latke	Shiv Sena
2022^	Rutuja Latke	Shiv Sena (UBT)
2024	Murji Patel	Shiv Sena

^by-election

== Election results ==
Vote share of winning candidates
2024	56.44%
2022 by-election	90.19%
2019	43.96%
2014	34.89%
2009	40.74%

=== Assembly Election 2024 ===
2024 Maharashtra Legislative Assembly election : Andheri East
Party	Candidate	Votes	%	±%
SS	Murji Patel	94,010	56.44%	New
SS(UBT)	Rutuja Ramesh Latke	68,524	41.14%	▼49.05
NOTA	None of the Above	2,346	1.41%	▼15.95
VBA	Adv. Sanjeevkumar Apparav Kalkori	1,821	1.09%	New
Margin of victory		25,486	15.30%	▼57.53
Turnout		1,68,903	58.61%	▲30.63
Total valid votes		1,66,557		
Registered electors		2,88,185		▲6.13
SS gain from SS(UBT)		Swing	▼33.75	

=== Assembly By-election 2022 ===
2022 Maharashtra Legislative Assembly by-election : Andheri East
Party	Candidate	Votes	%	±%
SS(UBT)	Rutuja Ramesh Latke	66,530	90.19%	New
NOTA	None of the Above	12,806	17.36%	▲14.34
Independent	Rajesh Tripathi	1,571	2.13%	New
Independent	Neena Khedekar	1,531	2.08%	New
Aapki Apni Party (Peoples)	Bala Venkatesh Vinayak Nadar	1,515	2.05%	New
Independent	Farhana Siraj Sayed	1,093	1.48%	New
RRP	Manoj Nayak	900	1.22%	New
Independent	Milind Kamble	624	0.85%	New
Margin of victory		53,724	72.83%	▲60.95
Turnout		86,198	31.75%	▼24.82
Total valid votes		73,764		
Registered electors		2,71,531		▼1.16
SS(UBT) gain from SS		Swing	▲46.24	

=== Assembly Election 2019 ===
2019 Maharashtra Legislative Assembly election : Andheri East
Party	Candidate	Votes	%	±%
SS	Ramesh Latke	62,773	43.96%	▲9.06
Independent	Murji Patel	45,808	32.08%	New
INC	Amin Jagdish Kutty	27,951	19.57%	▼5.48
VBA	Sharad Sopan Yetam	4,315	3.02%	New
NOTA	None of the Above	4,311	3.02%	▲1.94
BSP	Adv. Rahul Kamble	917	0.64%	▼0.06
Margin of victory		16,965	11.88%	▲8.26
Turnout		1,47,863	53.82%	▼0.89
Total valid votes		1,42,806		
Registered electors		2,74,716		▼4.04
SS hold		Swing	▲9.06	

=== Assembly Election 2014 ===
2014 Maharashtra Legislative Assembly election : Andheri East
Party	Candidate	Votes	%	±%
SS	Ramesh Latke	52,817	34.89%	▼2.09
BJP	Sunil Lalanprasad Yadav	47,338	31.27%	New
INC	Suresh Shetty	37,929	25.06%	▼15.68
MNS	Dalvi Sandeep Sitaram	9,420	6.22%	▼12.00
NOTA	None of the Above	1,632	1.08%	New
NCP	Akhilesh Singh	1,327	0.88%	New
BSP	Rahul Yuvraj Kamble	1,065	0.70%	▼0.07
Margin of victory		5,479	3.62%	▼0.13
Turnout		1,53,022	53.45%	▲3.17
Total valid votes		1,51,371		
Registered electors		2,86,282		▲3.53
SS gain from INC		Swing	▼5.84	

=== Assembly Election 2009 ===
2009 Maharashtra Legislative Assembly election : Andheri East
Party	Candidate	Votes	%	±%
INC	Suresh Shetty	55,990	40.74%	New
SS	Ramesh Latke	50,837	36.99%	New
MNS	Sandeep Sitaram Dalvi	25,052	18.23%	New
CPI(M)	Bojgar Chandrakant Sitaram	2,822	2.05%	New
BSP	Yadav Lalmani Ramraj	1,065	0.77%	New
Margin of victory		5,153	3.75%	
Turnout		1,37,446	49.70%	
Total valid votes		1,37,445		
Registered electors		2,76,529		
INC win (new seat)				
