= H. R. Gokhale =

Indian politician

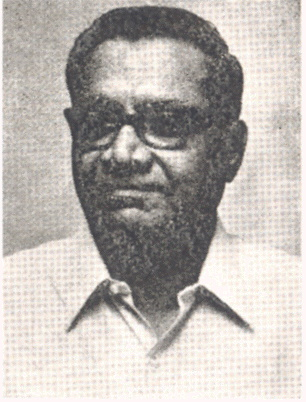

Union Minister of Law, Justice and Company Affairs
- In office 18 March 1971–24 March 1977 (Note: Minister of Law and Justice, until 5 February 1973)
- Prime Minister: Indira Gandhi
- Preceded by: Kengal Hanumanthaiah
- Succeeded by: Shanti Bhushan

Union Minister of Petroleum and Chemicals
- In office 29 January 1972–5 February 1973
- Prime Minister: Indira Gandhi
- Preceded by: Prakash Chandra Sethi
- Succeeded by: D. K. Barooah

Member of Parliament, Lok Sabha
- In office 1971–1977
- Preceded by: Shantilal Shah
- Succeeded by: Ram Jethmalani
- Constituency: Mumbai North West

Personal details
- Born: 5 October 1915
- Died: 15 February 1978 (aged 62)
- Party: Indian National Congress

H. R. Gokhale (5 October 1915 – 15 February 1978) was an Indian politician who was a member of the Indian National Congress from Maharashtra and of the Lok Sabha from Mumbai North West. He served as cabinet minister of Law and Justice in the Indira Gandhi government during The Emergency (1975–1977). He died at the age of 62 after suffering a heart attack in New Delhi in February 1978.

He was the father in law of the writer Namita Gokhale.
