= Versova Assembly constituency =

Constituency of the Maharashtra legislative assembly in India

Coordinates: 19.137°N 72.814°E

Versova
- Constituency No. 164 for the Maharashtra Legislative Assembly

Constituency details
- Country: India
- Region: Western India
- State: Maharashtra
- District: Mumbai Suburban
- Lok Sabha constituency: Mumbai North West
- Established: 2008
- Total electors: 286,744
- Reservation: None

Member of Legislative Assembly
- 15th Maharashtra Legislative Assembly
- Incumbent Haroon Khan
- Party: SS(UBT)
- Alliance: MVA
- Elected year: 2024

Versova Assembly constituency is one of the 288 Vidhan Sabha (legislative assembly) constituencies in Maharashtra state in western India.

== Overview ==
Versova (constituency number 164) is one of the 26 Vidhan Sabha constituencies located in Mumbai Suburban district. The number of electors in 2009 was 251,940 (male 138,805, female 113,135).

Versova is part of Mumbai North West Lok Sabha constituency along with five other Vidhan Sabha constituencies in Mumbai Suburban district, namely Dindoshi, Goregaon, Jogeshwari East, Andheri East and Andheri West.

== Members of the Legislative Assembly ==
Year	Member	Party
Till 2009 : Constituency did not exist
2009	Baldev Khosa	Indian National Congress
2014	Bharti Lavekar	Bharatiya Janata Party
2019	Bharti Lavekar	Bharatiya Janata Party
2024	Haroon Khan	Shiv Sena (UBT)

== Election results ==
=== Assembly Election 2024 ===
2024 Maharashtra Legislative Assembly election : Versova
Party	Candidate	Votes	%	±%
SS(UBT)	Haroon Rashid Khan	65,396	44.60%	New
BJP	Dr. Bharati Hemant Lavekar	63,796	43.51%	▲8.87
Independent	Raju Shripad Pednekar	6,752	4.60%	New
MNS	Sandesh Desai	5,037	3.44%	▼0.81
AIMIM	Raiees Lashkaria	2,937	2.00%	New
ASP(KR)	Ajaz khan	155		New
NOTA	None of the Above	1,298	0.89%	▼1.05
Margin of victory		1,600	1.09%	▼3.28
Turnout		147,928	51.59%	▲9.21
Total valid votes		146,630		
Registered electors		286,744		▲0.57
SS(UBT) gain from BJP		Swing	▲9.96	

=== Assembly Election 2019 ===
2019 Maharashtra Legislative Assembly election : Versova
Party	Candidate	Votes	%	±%
BJP	Dr. Bharati Hemant Lavekar	41,057	34.64%	▼8.50
INC	Baldev Khosa	35,871	30.26%	▲10.28
Independent	Rajul Suresh Patel	32,706	27.59%	New
MNS	Sandesh Desai	5,037	4.25%	▼8.48
VBA	Abdul Hamid Abdul Qayyum Shaik	2,577	2.17%	New
NOTA	None of the Above	2,294	1.94%	▼0.93
Margin of victory		5,186	4.38%	▼18.78
Turnout		120,840	42.38%	▲4.57
Total valid votes		118,526		
Registered electors		285,116		▼5.43
BJP hold		Swing	▼8.50	

=== Assembly Election 2014 ===
2014 Maharashtra Legislative Assembly election : Versova
Party	Candidate	Votes	%	±%
BJP	Dr. Bharati Hemant Lavekar	49,182	43.14%	New
INC	Baldev Khosa	22,784	19.99%	▼24.55
AIMIM	Abdul Hamid Shaikh	20,127	17.65%	New
MNS	Manish Dhuri	14,508	12.73%	▲3.13
NCP	Narendra Verma	3,710	3.25%	New
NOTA	None of the Above	3,266	2.86%	New
SP	S. M. Khan	1,210	1.06%	▼9.49
Margin of victory		26,398	23.16%	▲11.20
Turnout		117,290	38.90%	▼2.13
Total valid votes		114,002		
Registered electors		301,483		▲19.66
BJP gain from INC		Swing	▼1.39	

=== Assembly Election 2009 ===
2009 Maharashtra Legislative Assembly election : Versova
Party	Candidate	Votes	%	±%
INC	Baldev Khosa	44,814	44.54%	New
SS	Yashodhar (Shailesh) P. Phanse	32,784	32.58%	New
SP	Changez Multani	10,622	10.56%	New
MNS	Dhuri Manish Suresh	9,659	9.60%	New
BSP	Bharat Bharati	678	0.67%	New
Hindustani Swaraj Party	Daulat Singh	635	0.63%	New
Margin of victory		12,030	11.96%	
Turnout		100,644	39.95%	
Total valid votes		100,625		
Registered electors		251,940		
INC win (new seat)				

== See also ==
- Versova (disambiguation)
- List of constituencies of Maharashtra Vidhan Sabha
