= Goregaon Assembly constituency =

Legislative assembly constituency of Maharashtra, India

Coordinates: 19.149°N 72.879°E

Goregaon
- Constituency No. 163 for the Maharashtra Legislative Assembly

Constituency details
- Country: India
- Region: Western India
- State: Maharashtra
- District: Mumbai Suburban
- Lok Sabha constituency: Mumbai North West
- Established: 1978
- Total electors: 329,239
- Reservation: None

Member of Legislative Assembly
- 15th Maharashtra Legislative Assembly
- Incumbent Vidya Thakur
- Party: Bharatiya Janata Party
- Elected year: 2024

Goregaon Assembly constituency is one of the 288 Vidhan Sabha (legislative assembly) constituencies in Maharashtra state in western India.

== Overview ==
Goregaon constituency is one of the 26 Vidhan Sabha constituencies located in the Mumbai Suburban district.

Goregaon is part of the Mumbai North West Lok Sabha constituency along with five other Vidhan Sabha segments, namely Dindoshi, Versova, Jogeshwari East, Andheri West and Andheri West in the Mumbai Suburban district.

== Members of the Legislative Assembly ==
Year	Member	Party
1951-1978: Seat did not exist
1978	Padmakar Samant	Janata Party
1980	C. M. Sharma	Indian National Congress
1985	Mrinal Gore	Janata Party
1990	Subhash Desai	Shiv Sena
1995	Nandkumar Kale	Shiv Sena
1999	Nandkumar Kale	Shiv Sena
2004	Subhash Desai	Shiv Sena
2009	Subhash Desai	Shiv Sena
2014	Vidya Thakur	Bharatiya Janata Party
2019	Vidya Thakur	Bharatiya Janata Party
2024	Vidya Thakur	Bharatiya Janata Party

== Election results ==
=== Assembly Election 2024 ===
2024 Maharashtra Legislative Assembly election : Goregaon
Party	Candidate	Votes	%	±%
BJP	Vidya Jaiprakash Thakur	96,364	52.36%	▼0.97
SS(UBT)	Sameer Kamlakar Desai	72,764	39.54%	New
MNS	Virendra Vijay Jadhav	9,718	5.28%	▼12.24
NOTA	None of the Above	1,805	0.98%	New
Margin of victory		23,600	12.82%	▼19.28
Turnout		184,033	55.32%	▲9.45
Registered electors		329,239		▲0.40
BJP hold		Swing	▼0.97	

=== Assembly Election 2019 ===
2019 Maharashtra Legislative Assembly election : Goregaon
Party	Candidate	Votes	%	±%
BJP	Vidya Jaiprakash Thakur	81,233	53.33%	▲14.48
INC	Mohite Yuvraj Ganesh	32,326	21.22%	▲9.98
MNS	Virendra Vijay Jadhav	26,689	17.52%	▲13.60
VBA	Noshad Yakub Shikalgar	5,363	3.52%	New
NOTA	None of the Above	4,217	2.77%	New
BSP	Amol Dasharath Sawant	1,181	0.78%	▼0.00
Margin of victory		48,907	32.11%	▲29.20
Turnout		152,325	45.16%	▼2.05
Registered electors		327,926		▼2.89
BJP hold		Swing	▲14.48	

=== Assembly Election 2014 ===
2014 Maharashtra Legislative Assembly election : Goregaon
Party	Candidate	Votes	%	±%
BJP	Vidya Jaiprakash Thakur	63,629	38.85%	New
SS	Subhash Desai	58,873	35.94%	▼11.50
INC	Ganesh Mhasnaji Kamble	18,414	11.24%	New
NCP	Shashank Rao	9,287	5.67%	▼24.74
MNS	Sharad Keshav Sawant	6,420	3.92%	▼13.91
NOTA	None of the Above	1,935	1.18%	New
BSP	Manohar Ambadas Ratnaparkhe	1,274	0.78%	▼0.79
Margin of victory		4,756	2.90%	▼14.13
Turnout		163,787	47.93%	▲0.50
Registered electors		337,693		▲11.27
BJP gain from SS		Swing	▼8.59	

=== Assembly Election 2009 ===
2009 Maharashtra Legislative Assembly election : Goregaon
Party	Candidate	Votes	%	±%
SS	Subhash Desai	69,117	47.44%	▼2.60
NCP	Sharad Rao	44,302	30.41%	▼12.70
MNS	Dr. Uday C. Mashelkar	25,982	17.83%	New
BSP	Avelino Celistine D'Souza (Ilu Cablewala)	2,285	1.57%	▼0.02
Independent	Zafer Naseem Shaikh	958	0.66%	New
Margin of victory		24,815	17.03%	▲10.11
Turnout		145,689	48.00%	▼3.53
Registered electors		303,502		▲18.49
SS hold		Swing	▼2.60	

=== Assembly Election 2004 ===
2004 Maharashtra Legislative Assembly election : Goregaon
Party	Candidate	Votes	%	±%
SS	Subhash Desai	66,050	50.04%	▼3.55
NCP	Sharad Rao	56,911	43.11%	New
SP	Kuber Mourya	3,283	2.49%	New
BSP	Ramkumar B. Ridlan	2,097	1.59%	New
Margin of victory		9,139	6.92%	▼26.01
Turnout		132,003	51.54%	▲7.50
Registered electors		256,135		▲6.01
SS hold		Swing	▼3.55	

=== Assembly Election 1999 ===
1999 Maharashtra Legislative Assembly election : Goregaon
Party	Candidate	Votes	%	±%
SS	Nandkumar Kale	57,019	53.59%	▲11.61
RPI	Kashinath Munniram Pasi	21,976	20.65%	New
JD(S)	Ramesh Gajanan Joshi	10,867	10.21%	New
JD(U)	Suresh Kapile	3,638	3.42%	New
Margin of victory		35,043	32.93%	▲17.56
Turnout		106,402	41.42%	▼18.07
Registered electors		241,616		▲9.29
SS hold		Swing	▲11.61	

=== Assembly Election 1995 ===
1995 Maharashtra Legislative Assembly election : Goregaon
Party	Candidate	Votes	%	±%
SS	Nandkumar Kale	57,638	41.98%	▲1.00
SAP	Sharad Rao	36,523	26.60%	New
INC	Chavan Anant Shankar	30,030	21.87%	▲5.82
Independent	Joshi Ramesh Gajanan	3,902	2.84%	New
Margin of victory		21,115	15.38%	▲14.86
Turnout		137,310	61.03%	▲7.02
Registered electors		221,078		▲6.14
SS hold		Swing	▲1.00	

=== Assembly Election 1990 ===
1990 Maharashtra Legislative Assembly election : Goregaon
Party	Candidate	Votes	%	±%
SS	Subhash Desai	47,021	40.98%	New
JD	Sharad Rao	46,426	40.46%	New
INC	Indumati Patel	18,413	16.05%	▼20.14
Margin of victory		595	0.52%	▼13.37
Turnout		114,740	54.54%	▲4.92
Registered electors		208,288		▲39.17
SS gain from JP		Swing	▼9.10	

=== Assembly Election 1985 ===
1985 Maharashtra Legislative Assembly election : Goregaon
Party	Candidate	Votes	%	±%
JP	Mrinal Gore	37,598	50.08%	▲40.23
INC	Chandranath Matadin Sharma	27,169	36.19%	New
Independent	Sharad Gupte	6,674	8.89%	New
LKD	Jaswant Singh Brijaraj Singh	1,351	1.80%	New
Independent	Kale Manohar Baburao	512	0.68%	New
Margin of victory		10,429	13.89%	▲10.98
Turnout		75,077	49.55%	▲13.82
Registered electors		149,661		▲11.48
JP gain from INC(I)		Swing	▲12.09	

=== Assembly Election 1980 ===
1980 Maharashtra Legislative Assembly election : Goregaon
Party	Candidate	Votes	%	±%
INC(I)	C. M. Sharma	18,535	37.99%	New
BJP	Narendrakumar Konkar	17,113	35.07%	New
Independent	Nevarekar K. R.	5,849	11.99%	New
JP	Sadanand Ganesh Naik	4,807	9.85%	▼53.98
RPI	Ajitkumar A. Mane	1,525	3.13%	New
Margin of victory		1,422	2.91%	▼44.77
Turnout		48,790	35.99%	▼27.31
Registered electors		134,250		▲10.13
INC(I) gain from JP		Swing	▼25.84	

=== Assembly Election 1978 ===
1978 Maharashtra Legislative Assembly election : Goregaon
Party	Candidate	Votes	%	±%
JP	Samant Padmakar Balkrishna	49,529	63.83%	New
SS	Desai Subhash Rajaram	12,531	16.15%	New
INC	D'Souza Jochim Kaltan	8,448	10.89%	New
Independent	Gaikwad Dagdu Mayappa	5,892	7.59%	New
Margin of victory		36,998	47.68%	
Turnout		77,590	62.68%	
Registered electors		121,896		
JP win (new seat)				

== See also ==
- Goregaon
- List of constituencies of Maharashtra Vidhan Sabha
