= Balak Aur Janwar =

1975 film

- Directed by: Nanabhai Bhatt
- Music by: Chitragupt
- Release date: 1975
- Country: India
- Language: Hindi

Balak Aur Janwar (The Child and Animal) is a 1975 Bollywood drama film directed by Nanabhai Bhatt.

== Cast ==
- Randhawa
- Mohan Choti
- Dulari
- Alankar Joshi
- Kanan Kaushal
- Baldev Khosa
- Usha Solanki

== Soundtrack ==
All songs were written by Bharat Vyas and composed by Chitragupt.

- "Chahe Jal Jal Mare Sari Duniya" – Mohammed Rafi
- "Aao Hilmil Pyaar Se Khele" – Lata Mangeshkar
- "Om Nama Shivay" – Mahendra Kapoor
- "Balak Hu Par Badi Baat Kehta Hu" – Lata Mangeshkar
- "Aa Ja Sanam Chod Sharam" – Asha Bhosle
- "Balak Hai Bhola Bhala" – Mahendra Kapoor
