= Amboli Assembly constituency =

Former constituency of the Maharashtra legislative assembly in India

Coordinates: 15.96°N 74.00°E

Amboli
- Former constituency for the Maharashtra Legislative Assembly

Constituency details
- Country: India
- Region: Western India
- State: Maharashtra
- Established: 1978
- Abolished: 2008

Amboli Vidhan Sabha constituency was one of the seats in Maharashtra Legislative Assembly in India. Amboli is a suburb of Mumbai.

== Members of Vidhan Sabha ==
Year	Member	Party
1978	Ramesh Sheth	Janata Party
1980	Hafiz Yusuf	Indian National Congress (I)
1985	Baldev Khosa	Indian National Congress
1990	Shantaram Ambre	Shiv Sena
1995	Shantaram Ambre	Shiv Sena
1999	Baldev Khosa	Indian National Congress
2004	Baldev Khosa	Indian National Congress
2008 onwards: See Andheri East

== Election results ==
=== Assembly Election 2004 ===
2004 Maharashtra Legislative Assembly election : Amboli
Party	Candidate	Votes	%	±%
INC	Baldev Khosa	82,153	47.51%	▼0.39
SS	Jaywant Mahadeo Parab	72,206	41.76%	▲1.69
SP	Mohseen Haider Haji Haider	9,436	5.46%	▼1.54
BSP	Ahmed Khan Durrani Shah	3,949	2.28%	▲1.78
Independent	Sanjay Shivnath Sarraf	1,454	0.84%	New
Margin of victory		9,947	5.75%	▼2.07
Turnout		1,72,917	44.70%	▲3.77
Total valid votes		1,72,915		
Registered electors		3,86,881		▲8.07
INC hold		Swing	▼0.39	

=== Assembly Election 1999 ===
1999 Maharashtra Legislative Assembly election : Amboli
Party	Candidate	Votes	%	±%
INC	Baldev Khosa	70,183	47.90%	▲14.63
SS	Shantaram Soma Ambre	58,715	40.07%	▲0.36
SP	Sheikh Aiesha Riyaz	10,258	7.00%	New
Independent	Makwana Ismail Mohammed	4,743	3.24%	New
Margin of victory		11,468	7.83%	▲1.39
Turnout		1,49,687	41.81%	▼12.95
Total valid votes		1,46,520		
Registered electors		3,57,990		▲6.25
INC gain from SS		Swing	▲8.19	

=== Assembly Election 1995 ===
1995 Maharashtra Legislative Assembly election : Amboli
Party	Candidate	Votes	%	±%
SS	Shantaram Soma Ambre	72,079	39.71%	▲5.42
INC	Makwana Ismail Mohammed	60,386	33.27%	▲15.11
Independent	Narendra Verma	28,887	15.91%	New
Independent	Motiram G. Bhave	12,087	6.66%	New
PDP	Dr. Amjadali R. Chaudhari	1,741	0.96%	New
Independent	Khan Kalimullah Abdullah	1,372	0.76%	New
Margin of victory		11,693	6.44%	▲0.58
Turnout		1,84,277	54.69%	▲0.24
Total valid votes		1,81,522		
Registered electors		3,36,921		▲29.30
SS hold		Swing	▲5.42	

=== Assembly Election 1990 ===
1990 Maharashtra Legislative Assembly election : Amboli
Party	Candidate	Votes	%	±%
SS	Shantaram Soma Ambre	47,921	34.29%	New
AIML	Makwana Ismail Mohammed	39,728	28.43%	New
INC	Baldev Khosa	25,375	18.16%	▼31.88
JD	Motiram G. Bhave	25,158	18.00%	New
Margin of victory		8,193	5.86%	▼21.62
Turnout		1,41,442	54.28%	▲12.42
Total valid votes		1,39,757		
Registered electors		2,60,579		▲35.05
SS gain from INC		Swing	▼15.75	

=== Assembly Election 1985 ===
1985 Maharashtra Legislative Assembly election : Amboli
Party	Candidate	Votes	%	±%
INC	Baldev Khosa	39,797	50.04%	New
BJP	Padmanabha Acharya	17,944	22.56%	▼3.62
Independent	Mohammed Ayub Khan	14,993	18.85%	New
LKD	Pandhari Yadav	2,618	3.29%	New
CPI	Deshmukh Shivaji Baburao	2,053	2.58%	New
Independent	Mahadik S. R.	708	0.89%	New
Independent	Chhabra G. N.	703	0.88%	New
Margin of victory		21,853	27.48%	▲8.08
Turnout		80,612	41.78%	▲3.29
Total valid votes		79,531		
Registered electors		1,92,957		▲25.53
INC gain from INC(I)		Swing	▲4.46	

=== Assembly Election 1980 ===
1980 Maharashtra Legislative Assembly election : Amboli
Party	Candidate	Votes	%	±%
INC(I)	Hafiz Yusuf	26,572	45.58%	▲22.56
BJP	Ramesh Sheth	15,266	26.19%	New
JP	M. G. Bhave	11,920	20.45%	▼28.69
AIML	Azami S. L.	3,819	6.55%	New
Margin of victory		11,306	19.39%	▼6.73
Turnout		58,978	38.37%	▼20.41
Total valid votes		58,296		
Registered electors		1,53,712		▲14.91
INC(I) gain from JP		Swing	▼3.56	

=== Assembly Election 1978 ===
1978 Maharashtra Legislative Assembly election : Amboli
Party	Candidate	Votes	%	±%
JP	Ramesh Sheth	38,349	49.14%	New
INC(I)	Indulkar Pratap Mahadeo	17,965	23.02%	New
INC	Indumati Tribhuvan Patel	10,021	12.84%	New
SS	Shantaram Soma Ambre	8,022	10.28%	New
CPI	Dhume Balkrishna Shantaram	3,119	4.00%	New
Margin of victory		20,384	26.12%	
Turnout		79,308	59.29%	
Total valid votes		78,038		
Registered electors		1,33,771		
JP win (new seat)				

== See also ==
- List of constituencies of Maharashtra Legislative Assembly
