= Santoshi Mata =

Hindu goddess

- Goddess of satisfaction
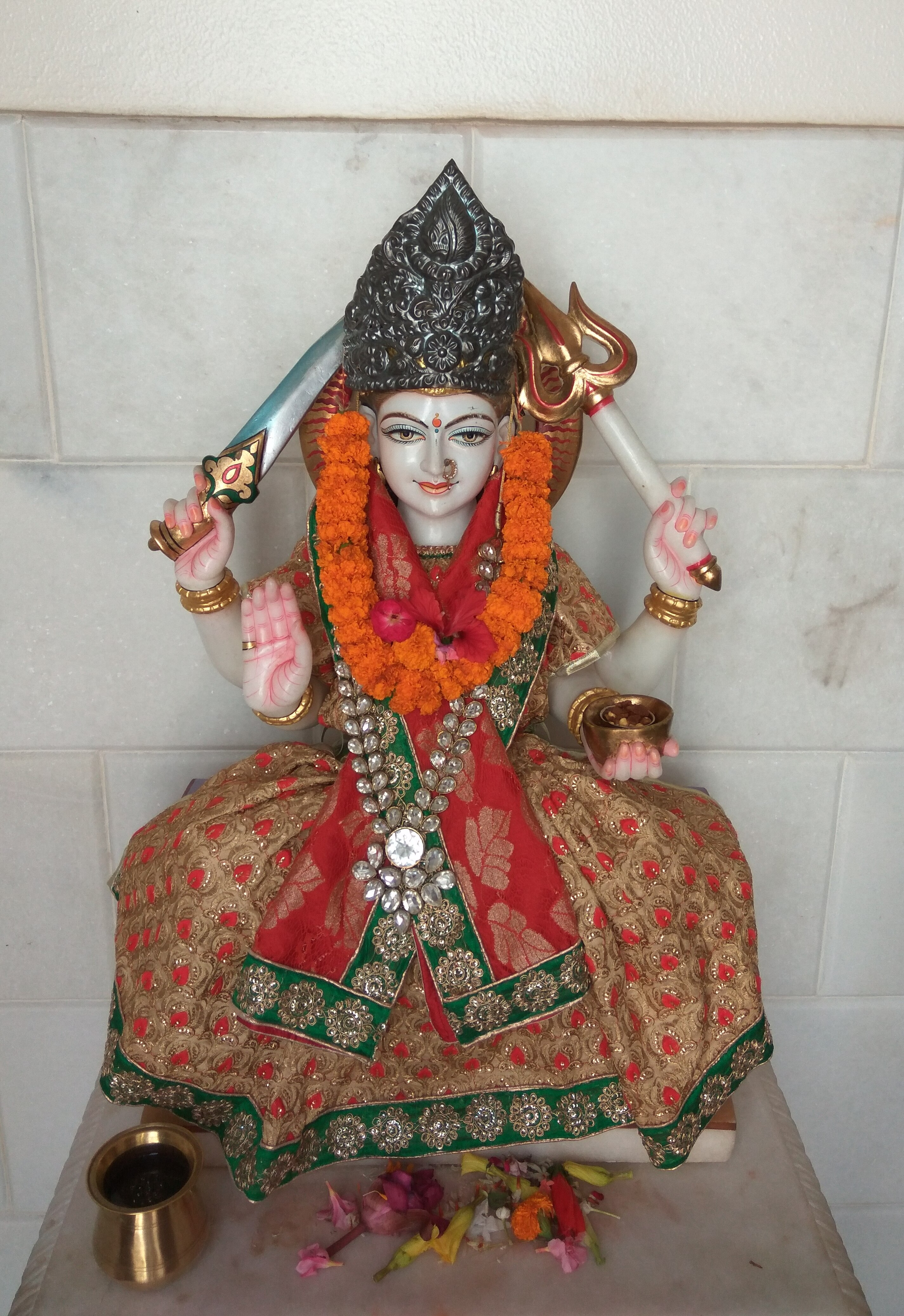
- Devanagari: संतोषी माता
- Affiliation: Devi
- Abode: Svānandaloka
- Mantra: Om shri santoshi mahamaye gajanandam dayini shukravara priye devi narayani namostute
- Weapon: Sword, golden pot of rice and Trishula (trident)
- Day: Friday
- Mount: Tiger, cow or lotus
- Texts: Jai Santoshi Maa (film)

Genealogy
- Parents: Ganesha (father); Riddhi and Siddhi (mother)
- Siblings: Shubha/Kşema (brother); Labha (brother)

Santoshi Mata (Hindi: संतोषी माता) or Santoshi Maa (संतोषी माँ) is a Hindu goddess, who is venerated as "the Mother of Satisfaction", the meaning of her name. Santoshi Mata is particularly worshipped by women of North India and Nepal. A vrata (ritual fast) called the Santoshi Maa vrata is performed by women on 16 consecutive Fridays to win the goddess' favour.

Santoshi Maa's prayers initially spread through word of mouth, vrata-pamphlet literature, and poster art. Her vrata was gaining popularity with North Indian women. However, it was the 1975 Bollywood film Jai Santoshi Maa ("Victory to Santoshi Maa")—narrating the story of the goddess and her ardent devotee Satyavati—which propelled this then little-known goddess to the heights of devotional fervour among Indian Hindus. With the rising popularity of the film, Santoshi Mata entered the pan-Indian Hindu pantheon and her images and shrines were incorporated in Hindu temples. The film portrayed the goddess to be the daughter of the popular Hindu god Ganesha and related her to the Raksha Bandhan festival. She maybe considered a deity and Kuladevi of some people in Rajasthan according to certain people on media platforms.

== Historical development ==
The 1975 film Jai Santoshi Maa elevated Santoshi Mata, a little-known goddess to the pan-Indian Hindu pantheon. The screenings of the film were accompanied by religious rituals by the audience. Some of the audience entered the theatre barefoot, as in a Hindu temple, and small shrines and temples dedicated to the goddess, started gaining popularity all over North India. The film attained cult status and years after its release, special matinee Friday screenings were organized for women, who observed the goddess' Friday vrata (ritual fast) and engaged in her worship. The success of this low-budget film and media reports of the "sudden emergence of a celluloid goddess resulted in scholarly interest in Santoshi Mata".

Santoshi Mata emerged more popularly in the early 1960s with five dispersed temples in North India. Her iconography also became more defined in this period and it slowly spread through poster art. Her worship spread among women through word of mouth, pamphlet literature, and poster art. It was the wife of Vijay Sharma, the director of Jai Santoshi Maa, who urged her husband to "spread the goddess's message".

Santoshi Ma became a widely recognized figure in Hindu homes after the release of the movie Jai Santoshi Ma. [...] Her rapid acceptance by people can be attributed to her being part of a larger and already well-integrated culture of the Goddess. Her characteristic moods, attributes and iconography, are shared with other Hindu goddesses long familiar in Hindu culture. Santoshi Mata's characteristic posture standing or sitting on a lotus resembles that of the goddess Lakshmi (Shri). The weapons she held—the sword and the trident—are also attributes of the goddess Durga. The story of Santoshi Mata and Satyavati from Jai Santoshi Maa are similar to other Hindu legends like those of sati Anusuya, and the jealous goddess triad or of an ardent devotee—of the goddess Manasa—who faced opposition from her family and other goddesses to worship her patron Manasa.

A temple dedicated to Santoshi Mata existed in Jodhpur, Rajasthan, before the release of the film Jai Santoshi Maa, but it was also dedicated to the goddess known as Lal Sagar ki Mata—The Mother of the Lal Sagar Lake (Santoshi), on whose banks the temple is situated. However, Lal Sagar ki Mata unlike the vegetarian Santoshi Mata, was offered animal sacrifices. With rising popularity of the film, Santoshi Mata images and shrine were more and more incorporated in Hindu temples.

The Santoshi Maa vrata was gaining popularity among women in North India before the release of the film Jai Santoshi Maa. The fact that Santoshi Mata expected the inexpensive raw sugar and roasted chickpeas—associated with the "non-elite"—as offerings in her vrata and her benevolent nature made her popular with the masses. The film was instrumental in spreading the Santoshi Mata worship to the illiterate, who until then could not have known the written vrata katha (legend related to the vrata).

== Vrata ==
The Santoshi Mata vrata or devotional fast is to be observed on 16 successive Fridays or until one's wish is fulfilled. The devotee should perform a puja (worship) of Santoshi Mata and offer her flowers, incense and a bowl of raw sugar and roasted chickpeas (gur-chana). The devotee wakes up early morning, remembering the Goddess. Only one meal is taken during the fast day, and devotees avoid eating bitter or sour food and serving these to others, as sour or bitter food is somewhat addictive and hinders satisfaction. When the wish is granted, a devotee must then organize an udyapan ("bringing to conclusion") ceremony, where eight boys are to be served a festive meal.

In this type of worship, the devotee has to follow other strictures such as avoiding quarrels and hurting anyone. By means of this vrata one can live with harmony because the bad habits in human life like ignoring faith in God, stating falsehoods, behaving arrogantly, etc., can be removed. This vrata teaches the devotee to spread love, sympathy and happiness.

== Temples ==
There are many temples throughout India and abroad where the principal deity is Mata Santoshi.

North India: Harinagar, Delhi (NCR)

South India: Jai Nagar, Trichy (Tamil Nadu)

East India: Chakradharpur (Jharkhand)

West India (first ever temple): Lall Sagar, Jodhpur (Rajasthan) - Shri Santoshi Mata Mandir, Jodhpur, Rajasthan. There is also a famous Shri Santoshi Mata temple in Dombivli (west) and on LBS Marg, Mulund (west) near Mumbai.

Central India (second temple): Shri Santoshi Mata Mandir, Guna, MP.

Santoshi mata mandir, Neema ka Thana, Sikar, Rajasthan

== Legends ==
=== Vrata-katha ===
Unlike other Indian mythological films which were based on the Hindu epics or the Puranic scriptures, Jai Santoshi Maa was based on a popular pamphlet about the vrata katha (legend of the ritual fast) of Santoshi Mata's Friday vrata. The vrata katha is as follows: An old woman had seven sons, the youngest of whom was irresponsible. So, she served him the leftovers of his brother's meals as his daily meal. The wife of the youngest son learned of this and told her husband, who left the house to seek his fortune. He acquired work with a merchant and became wealthy, but forgot about his wife. His wife was tormented by her in-laws in the absence of her husband. One day, she learned of the sixteen-week Santoshi Maa vrata and performed it. As a result, Santoshi Mata appeared in her husband's dream and informed him of his wife's plight. He returned home wealthy and set up a separate household with his wife. In the udyapan ceremony of the vrata, the in-laws plotted against the wife and served sour food to the eight boys, offending Santoshi Mata. As a consequence, her husband was arrested. The wife re-performed the vrata and the udyapan. Her husband was released from prison and she soon bore a son. Once, the goddess visited the family, in a terrifying form; while the in-laws fled, the wife recognized the goddess and worshipped her. Then the in-laws asked forgiveness of the goddess and the whole family was blessed by the goddess. A. K. Ramanujan calls this tale with nameless characters as "the most interior kind of folktales: those generally told by women within domestic spaces." The vrata katha also does not associate the goddess with Ganesha—the god of obstacle removal and beginnings, who is described as her father in the film and other devotee literature.

=== Film - Jai Santoshi Maa 1975 ===
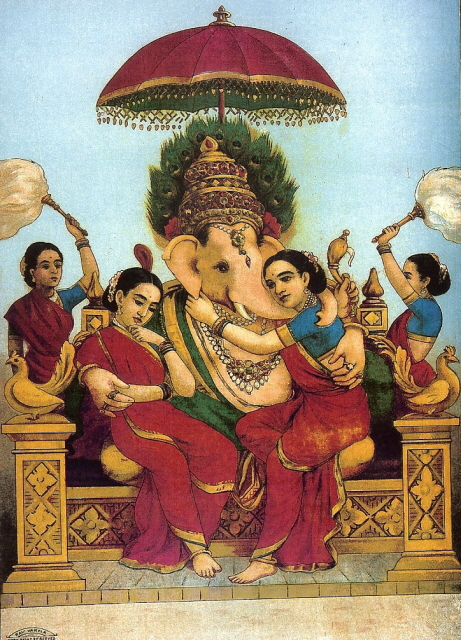
Ganesha with consorts Riddhi and Siddhi, who are portrayed as Santoshi Mata's parents in the film Jai Santoshi Maa.

The film Jai Santoshi Maa links the birth of Santoshi Mata to the festival of Raksha Bandhan, where a sister ties a rakhi (a type of string bracelet) on her brother's wrist and, in return, the brother gifts his sister sweets, gifts and a promise of eternal protection. When Ganesha's sister, Manasa, celebrates the festival with him, his sons ask Ganesha to grant them also a sister. Although Ganesha initially refuses, upon the repeated pleas of his sons, his two wives Riddhi and Siddhi, his sister and the divine sage Narada, Ganesha creates Santoshi Mata through two flames rising from his wives' breasts. Narada declares that this mind-born daughter of Ganesha will always fulfil everyone’s desires and, thus, would be called Santoshi Maa, the Mother of Happiness or Satisfaction.

The film then shifts from the heavenly abode of Ganesha to the earth, where the story of the goddess' devotee Satyavati is told. Satyavati prays to the goddess, to get her married to Birju. After her wish is granted, she undertakes a pilgrimage of the temples of Santoshi Mata with her husband. The mischievous Narada incites the jealousy of the goddess triad, Saraswati, Lakshmi and Parvati (Ganesha's mother, thus Santoshi Mata's grandmother), wives of the Hindu Trinity of gods, Brahma, Vishnu and Shiva respectively, towards the "new" goddess Santoshi Mata. The goddess triad unleash their wrath on Satyavati. Like the vrata katha, Birju leaves to make a fortune. The goddess triad spread the rumour that Birju is dead and the lone "widow", Satyavati, is tormented by her sisters-in-law. Birju forgets about Satyavati, but on the fulfilment of the Friday vrata by Satyavati, Santoshi Mata appears in Birju's dream and reminds him of his wife. Birju returns home a rich man and establishes a separate household with Satyavati. At the udayan ceremony, Satyavati's sisters-in-law mix sour food in the ritual meal, to be served to eight boys. Santoshi Mata punishes the sisters-in-law by crippling them and their sons, who have the ritual meal, fall dead. Satyavati is blamed for this misfortune. But, finally when Satyavati prays to the goddess, the goddess appears before Satyavati and restores the life of the boys and their mothers. Satyavati's kin then ask for the goddess' forgiveness. Ultimately, the goddess triad also repent and say that they were just testing Satyavati's devotion. Narada finally asks the goddess triad, their husbands and Ganesha to bless Santoshi Mata.
