= Jogeshwari East Assembly constituency =

Constituency of the Maharashtra legislative assembly in India

Coordinates: 19.135°N 72.856°E

Jogeshwari East
- Constituency No. 158 for the Maharashtra Legislative Assembly

Constituency details
- Country: India
- Region: Western India
- State: Maharashtra
- District: Mumbai Suburban
- Lok Sabha constituency: Mumbai North West
- Established: 2008
- Total electors: 299,070
- Reservation: None

Member of Legislative Assembly
- 15th Maharashtra Legislative Assembly
- Incumbent Anant B. Nar
- Party: SS(UBT)
- Alliance: MVA
- Elected year: 2024

Jogeshwari East Assembly constituency is one of the 26 Vidhan Sabha constituencies located in the Mumbai Suburban district.

== Overview ==
Jogeshwari East (constituency number 158) is one of the 26 Vidhan Sabha constituencies located in the Mumbai Suburban district. Number of electorates in 2009 was 283,561 (male 161,629, female 121,932).

Jogeshwari East is part of the Mumbai North West Lok Sabha constituency along with five other Vidhan Sabha segments, namely Goregaon, Versova, Dindoshi, Andheri East and Andheri West in the Mumbai Suburban district.

== Members of the Legislative Assembly ==
Year	Member	Party
Till 2009 : Constituency did not exist
2009	Ravindra Waikar	Shiv Sena
2014	Ravindra Waikar	Shiv Sena
2019	Ravindra Waikar	Shiv Sena
2024	Anant Nar	Shiv Sena (UBT)

== Election results ==
=== Assembly Election 2024 ===
2024 Maharashtra Legislative Assembly election : Jogeshwari East
Party	Candidate	Votes	%	±%
SS(UBT)	Anant Nar	77,044	44.03	New
SS	Manisha Ravindra Waikar	75,503	43.15	▼23.05
MNS	Bhalchandra Gangaram Ambure	12,805	7.32	New
NOTA	None of the Above	2,887	1.65	▼7.14
VBA	Parmeshwar Ashok Ranshur	2,819	1.61	▼2.09
Independent	Rohan Satone	1,986	1.14	New
Margin of victory		1,541	0.88	▼42.05
Turnout		1,77,851	59.47	▲9.94
Total valid votes		1,74,964		
Registered electors		2,99,070		▲6.06
SS(UBT) gain from SS		Swing	▼22.17	

=== Assembly Election 2019 ===
2019 Maharashtra Legislative Assembly election : Jogeshwari East
Party	Candidate	Votes	%	±%
SS	Ravindra Waikar	90,654	66.20	▲20.49
INC	Sunil Bisan Kumre	31,867	23.27	▲6.55
NOTA	None of the Above	12,031	8.79	▲7.51
VBA	Dilbag Singh	5,075	3.71	New
AAP	Vitthal Govind Lad	3,857	2.82	New
Independent	Milind Jagannath Bhole	3,304	2.41	New
BSP	Kundan Hindurao Waghmare	1,250	0.91	▲0.21
Independent	Anil Laxman Chavan	927	0.68	New
Margin of victory		58,787	42.93	▲24.74
Turnout		1,49,472	53.01	▼6.37
Total valid votes		1,36,934		
Registered electors		2,81,976		▼2.70
SS hold		Swing	▲20.49	

=== Assembly Election 2014 ===
2014 Maharashtra Legislative Assembly election : Jogeshwari East
Party	Candidate	Votes	%	±%
SS	Ravindra Waikar	72,767	45.71	▲1.79
BJP	Ujwala Modak	43,805	27.52	New
INC	Rajesh Prabhushankar Sharma	26,617	16.72	▼17.80
MNS	Bhalchandra Gangaram Ambure	11,874	7.46	▼10.93
NCP	Tawde Dinkar Hiroji	2,363	1.48	New
NOTA	None of the Above	2,038	1.28	New
BSP	Inamulla Rahimattullah Khan Alias Babu Khan	1,116	0.70	▲0.01
Margin of victory		28,962	18.19	▲8.79
Turnout		1,61,248	55.64	▲3.29
Total valid votes		1,59,187		
Registered electors		2,89,805		▲2.21
SS hold		Swing	▲1.79	

=== Assembly Election 2009 ===
2009 Maharashtra Legislative Assembly election : Jogeshwari East
Party	Candidate	Votes	%	±%
SS	Ravindra Waikar	64,318	43.92	New
INC	Jagtap Ashok Arjunrao Alias Bhai Jagtap	50,543	34.52	New
MNS	Chitre Sanjay Prabhakar	26,934	18.39	New
BSP	Salunke Ashok Sakharam	1,018	0.70	New
Independent	Sayyad Amanulla Bashir Ahmed	1,012	0.69	New
BBM	Talware Uddhav Hari	910	0.62	New
Margin of victory		13,775	9.41	
Turnout		1,46,431	51.64	
Total valid votes		1,46,427		
Registered electors		2,83,536		
SS win (new seat)				
