= Daljeet Kaur =

Indian actress (1953–2022)

- Born: 1953; Siliguri, West Bengal, India
- Died: 17 November 2022 (aged 69); Sudhar, Ludhiana district, Punjab, India

Daljeet Kaur (1953 – 17 November 2022) was an Indian actress known for her work in Punjabi cinema productions. Over the course of her acting career she appeared in more than 70 films.

Born in 1953, Kaur was raised in Siliguri, West Bengal. She was a graduate of the Lady Shri Ram College for Women in Delhi. Kaur studied acting at the Film and Television Institute of India in Pune. She made her acting debut in the 1976 film Daaj.

In addition to acting, she once played kabaddi and hockey at a national level.

Kaur died 17 November 2022.

== Filmography ==
- Daaj (1976)
- Saida Jogan (1979
- Jadd Da Gandasa (1982)
- Mamla Garbar Hai (1983)
- Putt Jattan De (1983)
- Faasle (1985)
- Mhara Pihar Sasra Haryanvi (1985)
- Yaar Gareeban Da (1987)
- Kabrastan (1988)
- Patola (1988)
- Tunka Pyar Da (1989)
- Anakh Jattan Di (1990)
- Jatt Punjab Daa (1992)
- Mahaul Theek Hai (1999)
- Singh vs Kaur (2013)
