= Jai Santoshi Maa =

- Cover art for the DVD release of the film
- Directed by: Vijay Sharma
- Written by: R. Priyadarshi
- Produced by: Satram Rohra
- Starring: Kanan Kaushal; Bharat Bhushan; Ashish Kumar; Anita Guha; Trilok Kapoor; Kabbir Khan
- Cinematography: Sudhendu Roy
- Edited by: R. D. Mahadik
- Music by: C. Arjun
- Production company: Bhagyalakshmi Chitra Mandir
- Distributed by: Bhagyalakshmi Chitra Mandir
- Release date: 30 May 1975
- Running time: 130 minutes
- Country: India
- Language: Hindi
- Budget: ₹2.5 million
- Box office: ₹50 million

Jai Santoshi Maa is a 1975 Indian Hindi-language devotional film directed by Vijay Sharma and written R. Priyadarshi. Santoshī Mā (also called Santoshi Mata) is the goddess of satisfaction. Usha Mangeshkar, sang the devotional songs for the film along with Mahendra Kapoor and the famous poet Kavi Pradeep, who wrote the song' lyrics. Made on a low-budget, the film became one of the most successful and profitable films at the box office.

== Plot ==
The film opens in the Devaloka, where we witness the "birth" of Goddess Santoshi Mata as the daughter of Ganesha, the elephant headed god of good beginnings, his two wives Riddhi and Siddhi ("prosperity" and "spiritual power"), and as the sister of Kshema and Labha ("safety" and "profit"). Although, Ganesha has another wife Buddhi ("wisdom"), she is not portrayed in the film.

A key role is played by the immortal sage Narada, a devotee of Vishnu, who regularly intervenes to advance the film's two parallel plots, which concern both human beings and gods.

We soon meet the 18th-century maiden Satyavati Sharma (Kanan Kaushal), leading a group of women in an aarti to the goddess. This first song, "Main To Arti Utaru" (I perform Mother Santoshi's aarti) exemplifies the experience of darshan —of "seeing" and being seen by a deity in the reciprocal act of "visual communion" that is central to Hindu worship.

Through the Mother's grace, Satyavati soon falls in love with Brijmohan aka Birju, the youngest of seven brothers in a prosperous Bias Brahmin farmer family, an artistic man, with a talent for singing. Alas, with the boy come the in-laws, and two of Birju's six sisters-in-law, Durga and Maya are jealous shrews who have it in for him and Satyavati from the beginning. To make matters worse, Narada "stirs up" the "jealousy" of the three principal goddesses, Lakshmi, Parvati, and Saraswati against the "upstart" goddess Santoshi Mata. They decide to examine (pariksha) her perseverance or faith (Shraddha) by making life miserable for her chief devotee. Of course, this is all just a charade and the holy goddesses are just acting as if they are jealous of Santoshi Mata to test Satyavati's devotion.

After a fight with his relatives, Birju leaves home to seek his fortune, narrowly escaping a watery grave (planned for him by the goddesses) through his wife's devotion to Santoshi Mata. Nevertheless, the divine ladies convince his family that he is indeed dead, adding the stigma of widowhood to Satyavati's other woes. Her sisters-in-law treat her like a slave, beat and starve her, and a local rogue attempts to rape her; Santoshi Mata rescues her several times. Eventually, Satyavati is driven to attempt suicide, but is stopped by Narada, who tells her about the sixteen-Fridays fast in honour of Santoshi Mata, which can grant any wish. Satyavati completes it with great difficulty and more divine assistance, and just in the nick of time: for the now-prosperous Birju, stricken with amnesia by the goddesses and living in a distant place, has fallen in love with a rich merchant's daughter. Through Santoshi Mata's grace, he gets his memory back and returns home laden with wealth. When he discovers the awful treatment given to his wife, he builds a palatial home for the two of them, complete with an in-house temple to the Holy Mother. Satyavati plans a grand ceremony upon the completion of her fast and invites her in-laws. But the celestials and sadistic sisters-in-law make a last-ditch effort to ruin her by squeezing lime juice into one of the dishes (the rules of Santoshi Mata's fast forbid eating, or serving, any sour or bitter food). All hell breaks loose, before peace is finally restored, on earth as it is in heaven, and a new deity is triumphantly welcomed to the pantheon, as Lakshmi, Saraswati and Parvati have been convinced of Satyavati's devotion.

== Cast ==
- Kanan Kaushal as Satyavati Vyas (née Sharma)
- Ashish Kumar as Brijmohan ("Birju") Vyas
- Anita Guha as Shri Santoshi Mata
- Bharat Bhushan as Pandit Devidutt Sharma, Satyavati's Father
- Rajani Bala as Geeta
- Trilok Kapoor as Lord Shiva
- Bela Bose as Durga Vyas
- B. M. Vyas as Geeta Father and jeweller businessman
- Rajan Haksar as Bhairav "Bhairavram" Vyas
- Manohar Desai as Dayakar ("Dayaram") Vyas
- Dilip Dutta
- Mahipal as Devarishi Narada
- Padmarani as Devi Mata Brahmani
- Leela Mishra
- Sushila Devi

== Soundtrack ==
Song composed by C. Arjun and lyricist written by Kavi Pradeep

Song	Singer
"Karti Hu Tumhara Vrat Main, Sweekar Karo Maa"	Usha Mangeshkar
"Yaha Waha Jaha Taha Mat Puchho Kaha Kaha Hai" – I	Kavi Pradeep
"Mai Toh Aaratee Utaru Re Santoshee Mata Kee"	Usha Mangeshkar
"Madad Karo Santoshi Mata"	Usha Mangeshkar
"Jai Santoshi Maa"	Kavi Pradeep
"Mat Ro Mat Ro Aaj Radhike"	Manna Dey
"Yaha Waha Jaha Taha Mat Puchho Kaha Kaha Hai" – II	Mahendra Kapoor

== Awards and nominations ==
- BFJA Award for Best Male Playback Singer (Hindi Section) – Pradeep for the song "Yahan Wahan"
- BFJA Award for Best Female Playback Singer (Hindi Section) – Usha Mangeshkar
- Filmfare Nomination for Best Female Playback Singer – Usha Mangeshkar for the song "Main To Aarti"
