= Putt Jattan De =

- Directed by: Jagjeet Gill
- Written by: Ajit Singh Deol
- Story by: Ajit Singh Deol
- Produced by: Davinder Singh Gill; Iqbal Dhillon
- Starring: Dharmendra; Shatrughan Sinha; Baldev Khosa; Daljeet Kaur
- Music by: Mohinderjit Singh & Surinder Shinda
- Release date: 26 August 1983
- Running time: 123 min
- Country: India
- Language: Punjabi

Putt Jattan De is a 1983 Punjabi film produced by Devinder Singh Gill and Iqbal Dhillon and directed by Jagjit Gill. It starred Daljeet Kaur and Baldev Khosa with Hindi stars Shatrughan Sinha and Dharmendra making special appearances. Surinder Shinda and Mohammad Sadiq were playback singers and acted as well.

== Cast ==
- Shatrughan Sinha ... Jagat Singh ‘Jagga’ Sarpanch
- Baldev Khosa ... Sukha
- Daljeet Kaur ... Paali
- Prakash Gill ... Jageera
- Dharmendra ... Chaudhary Dharam Singh
- Rehana Sultan ... Jagat Singh's Wife
- Girija Mitra ... Pyaaro- Paali's friend
- Surinder Shinda ... Shinda (first appearance)
- Mehar Mittal ... Baalam Pardesi
- Mohammad Sadiq ... Jabar Jang Singh
- Gugu Gill ... Cameo appearance
- Gopi Bhalla ... Chacha Amli
- Ved Goswami ... Qaidon- Paali's Chacha
- Sangeeta Mehta ... Saidan Jogan
- Rupinder Gill ... Thanedaar
- Laj Bedi ... Jagga's mother
- Surinder Walia ... Choorhi Wala
- Saroop Parinda ... Baalam's associate
- Makhan Singh ... Sajjan Singh- Paali's father

== Music ==
(1) Putt jattan de 4:53~Surinder Shinda in the cores (Amar Singh Chamkila, Pali Detwala, Kuldeep Paras,Lyrics By Hardev Dilgir known as Dev Dev Thrikewala

(2) Mere Timu Largaya = ਮੇਰੇ ਡੇਮੂੰ ਲੜ ਗਿਆ~ Ranjit Kaur,Lyrics By Dev Thrikewala

(3) Aaj Kal Diyan Kurian 3:27 ~ muhammad sadiq,Lyrics By Chann Gorayan Wala

(4) Thake Raat De Najare Savita Saathi Lyrics By Munsif

(5) Bollia 3:58 ~ Gulshan Komal, Narinder Biba, Gulshan Bawa,Lyrics By Shamsher Sandhu

(6) Jind Yar Di 4:22 ~ Surinder Shinda,Lyrics By Dev Thrikewala

(7) Chhala~ 5:39 Nirmal Sidhu,Lyrics By Baljit Parmar

(8) Tainu Hath Te ~Narinder Biba and Surinder Shinda,Lyrics By Shamsher Sandhu

(9) Bhan Churhian 4:51 ~ Surinder Shinda,Lyrics By Jagjeet
