= Appropriation Acts (Repeal) Act, 2016 =

Parliament of India
- Long title: An Act to repeal Appropriation Acts [including Appropriation (Railways) Acts].
- Citation: Act No. 22 of 2016
- Territorial extent: India
- Passed by: Lok Sabha
- Passed: 11 May 2015
- Passed by: Rajya Sabha
- Passed: 27 April 2016
- Assented to by: President Pranab Mukherjee
- Assented to: 6 May 2016
- Effective: 9 May 2016

Legislative history

Initiating chamber: Lok Sabha
- Bill title: Appropriation Acts (Repeal) Bill, 2015
- Bill citation: Bill No. 119 of 2015
- Introduced by: MoL&J Sadananda Gowda
- Introduced: 24 April 2015
- Passed: 11 May 2015

Revising chamber: Rajya Sabha
- Passed: 27 April 2016

Repeals
- 758 Appropriation Acts
- Status: Spent

The Appropriation Acts (Repeal) Act, 2016 is an Act of the Parliament of India that repealed 758 Appropriation Acts that were now obsolete. An Appropriation Act is an Act that authorizes the Government of India to withdraw funds from the Consolidated Fund of India to meet expenses for a fiscal year. The Act was among a series of repealing acts tabled by the Narendra Modi administration aimed at repealing obsolete laws.

== Background and legislative history ==
Prime Minister Narendra Modi had advocated the repeal of old laws during his 2014 general election campaign. At the 2015 Economic Times Global Business Summit, Modi stated, "Our country suffers from an excess of old and unnecessary laws which obstruct people and businesses. We began the exercise of identifying unnecessary laws and repealing them. 1,877 Central laws have been identified for repeal."

A bill to repeal 758 Appropriation Acts was approved by the Union Cabinet on 20 March 2015. The Appropriation Acts (Repeal) Bill, 2015 was introduced in the Lok Sabha on 24 April 2015 by then Minister of Law and Justice, D.V. Sadananda Gowda. The Bill sought to repeal 758 Appropriation Acts including 111 state appropriation acts enacted by Parliament between 1950 and 1976, and Railway Appropriation Acts enacted during 1950–2012. The bill was passed by the Lok Sabha on 11 May 2015. The Select Committee of the Rajya Sabha proposed including an automatic repeal clause in future Appropriation Acts. The government confirmed that such a clause would be included in the Appropriation Act, 2016. The Bill was passed by the Rajya Sabha on 27 April 2016. The bill received assent from then President Pranab Mukherjee on 6 May 2016, and was notified in The Gazette of India on 9 May 2016.

== Repealed Acts ==
The 758 Appropriation Acts included in the bill's Schedule were completely repealed.

Year	Act №	Short title
1950	XXIII	The Appropriation (Railways) Act, 1950
1950	XXIV	The Appropriation Act, 1950
1950	XXXIX	The Appropriation (No. 2) Act, 1950
1950	LX	The Appropriation (No. 3) Act, 1950
1950	LXXVII	The Appropriation (Railways) No. 2 Act, 1950
1950	LXXIX	The Appropriation (No. 4) Act, 1950
1951	VI	The Appropriation (Railways) Act, 1951
1951	VII	The Appropriation Act, 1951
1951	VIII	The Appropriation (Railways) No. 2 Act, 1951
1951	XII	The Appropriation (Vote on Account) Act, 1951
1951	XIV	The Appropriation (Railways) No. 3 Act, 1951
1951	XV	The Appropriation (No. 2 ) Act, 1951
1951	LVII	The Punjab Appropriation Act, 1951
1951	LVIII	The Appropriation (Railways) No. 4 Act, 1951
1951	LX	The Appropriation (No. 3) Act, 1951
1952	13	The Appropriation Act, 1952
1952	14	The Punjab Appropriation Act, 1952
1952	15	The Appropriation (Railways) Act, 1952
1952	21	The Appropriation (Railways) Vote on Account Act, 1952
1952	28	The Appropriation (Vote on Account) Act, 1952
1952	43	The Appropriation (Railways) No. 2 Act, 1952
1952	44	The Appropriation (No. 2) Act, 1952
1952	80	The Appropriation (No. 3) Act, 1952
1953	1	The Appropriation Act, 1953
1953	4	The Appropriation (Vote on Account) Act, 1953
1953	5	The Appropriation (Railways) Act, 1953
1953	6	The Appropriation (Railways) No. 2 Act, 1953
1953	7	The Patiala and East Punjab States Union Appropriation Act, 1953
1953	8	The Patiala and East Punjab States Union Appropriation (Vote on Account) Act, 1953
1953	9	The Appropriation (No. 2) Act, 1953
1953	13	The Appropriation (No. 3) Act, 1953
1953	17	The Patiala and East Punjab States Union Appropriation (No. 2) Act, 1953
1953	33	The Appropriation (No. 4) Act, 1953
1953	50	The Appropriation (No. 5) Act, 1953
1953	51	The Patiala and East Punjab States Union Appropriation (No. 3) Act, 1953
1954	5	The Appropriation Act, 1954
1954	6	The Appropriation (Railways) Act, 1954
1954	8	The Appropriation (Vote on Account) Act, 1954
1954	11	The Appropriation (Railways) No.2 Act, 1954
1954	16	The Appropriation (No. 2) Act, 1954
1954	40	The Appropriation (No. 3) Act, 1954
1954	47	The Appropriation (No. 4) Act, 1954
1954	56	The Andhra Appropriation Act, 1954
1955	3	The Andhra Appropriation Act, 1955
1955	4	The Andhra Appropriation (Vote on Account) Act, 1955
1955	5	The Appropriation (Railways) Act, 1955
1955	6	The Appropriation (Railways) No. 2 Act, 1955
1955	7	The Appropriation Act, 1955
1955	8	The Appropriation (Vote on Account) Act, 1955
1955	14	The Appropriation (No. 2) Act, 1955
1955	38	The Appropriation (No. 3) Act, 1955
1955	46	The Appropriation (No. 4) Act, 1955
1955	47	The Appropriation (No. 5) Act, 1955
1956	5	The Appropriation Act, 1956
1956	11	The Appropriation (Vote on Account) Act, 1956
1956	12	The Appropriation (Railways) Act, 1956
1956	13	The Appropriation (Railways) No. 2 Act, 1956
1956	14	The Appropriation (Railways) No. 3 Act, 1956
1956	15	The Appropriation (Railways) No. 4 Act, 1956
1956	16	The Appropriation (Railways) No. 5 Act, 1956
1956	19	The Appropriation (No. 2) Act, 1956
1956	20	The Travancore-Cochin Appropriation (Vote on Account) Act, 1956
1956	23	The Travancore-Cochin Appropriation Act, 1956
1956	43	The Appropriation (No. 3) Act, 1956
1956	44	The Appropriation (No. 4) Act, 1956
1956	46	The Travancore-Cochin Appropriation (No.2) Act, 1956
1956	83	The Appropriation (Railways) No. 6 Act, 1956
1956	84	The Appropriation (Railways) No. 7 Act, 1956
1956	85	The Appropriation (No. 5) Act, 1956
1957	1	The Appropriation Act, 1957
1957	2	The Appropriation (No. 2) Act, 1957
1957	3	The Appropriation (Vote on Account) Act, 1957
1957	4	The Kerala Appropriation Act, 1957
1957	6	The Appropriation (Railways) Act, 1957
1957	8	The Kerala Appropriation (Vote on Account) Act, 1957
1957	9	The Appropriation (Railways) Vote on Account Act, 1957
1957	15	The Appropriation (No. 3) Act, 1957
1957	22	The Appropriation (Railways) No. 2 Act, 1957
1957	24	The Appropriation (No. 4) Act, 1957
1957	56	The Appropriation (No. 5) Act, 1957
1958	4	The Appropriation Act, 1958
1958	6	The Appropriation (Railways) Act, 1958
1958	8	The Appropriation (Vote on Account) Act, 1958
1958	10	The Appropriation (Railways) No. 2 Act, 1958
1958	12	The Appropriation (No. 2) Act, 1958
1958	14	The Appropriation (No. 3) Act, 1958
1958	23	The Appropriation (Railways) No. 3 Act, 1958
1958	40	The Appropriation (No. 4) Act, 1958
1958	49	The Appropriation (Railways) No. 4 Act, 1958
1958	50	The Appropriation (Railways) No. 5 Act, 1958
1958	51	The Appropriation (No. 5) Act, 1958
1959	2	The Appropriation Act, 1959
1959	5	The Appropriation (Railways) Act, 1959
1959	6	The Appropriation (Railways) No. 2 Act, 1959
1959	7	The Appropriation (Vote on Account) Act, 1959
1959	11	The Appropriation (No. 2) Act, 1959
1959	18	The Appropriation (No. 3) Act, 1959
1959	19	The Appropriation (Railways) No. 3 Act, 1959
1959	34	The Appropriation (No. 4) Act, 1959
1959	35	The Appropriation (No. 5) Act, 1959
1959	36	The Appropriation (No. 6) Act, 1959
1959	39	The Kerala Appropriation Act, 1959
1959	40	The Appropriation (No. 7) Act, 1959
1959	53	The Kerala Appropriation (No.2) Act, 1959
1959	55	The Appropriation (No. 8) Act, 1959
1960	3	The Appropriation Act, 1960
1960	7	The Appropriation (Railways) Act, 1960
1960	8	The Appropriation (Railways) No. 2 Act, 1960
1960	9	The Appropriation (Vote on Account) Act, 1960
1960	12	The Appropriation (No. 2) Act, 1960
1960	15	The Appropriation (Railways) No. 3 Act, 1960
1960	29	The Appropriation (Railways) No. 4 Act, 1960
1960	30	The Appropriation (No. 3) Act, 1960
1960	36	The Appropriation (No. 4) Act, 1960
1960	49	The Appropriation (Railways) No. 5 Act, 1960
1960	50	The Appropriation (No. 5) Act, 1960
1961	2	The Appropriation Act, 1961
1961	3	The Orissa Appropriation Act, 1961
1961	5	The Appropriation (Railways) Act, 1961
1961	6	The Appropriation (Railways) No. 2 Act, 1961
1961	9	The Appropriation (Vote on Account) Act, 1961
1961	10	The Orissa Appropriation (Vote on Account) Act, 1961
1961	12	The Appropriation (No. 2) Act, 1961
1961	18	The Orissa Appropriation (No. 2) Act, 1961
1961	20	The Appropriation (No. 3) Act, 1961
1961	22	The Appropriation (Railways) No. 3 Act, 1961
1961	37	The Appropriation (No. 4) Act, 1961
1961	54	The Appropriation (Railways) No. 4 Act, 1961
1961	57	The Appropriation (No. 5) Act, 1961
1962	2	The Appropriation Act, 1962
1962	4	The Appropriation (Railways) Act, 1962
1962	5	The Appropriation (Vote on Account) Act, 1962
1962	12	The Appropriation (Railways) Vote on Account Act, 1962
1962	18	The Appropriation (Railways) No. 2 Act, 1962
1962	19	The Appropriation (No. 2) Act, 1962
1962	22	The Appropriation (No. 3) Act, 1962
1962	23	The Appropriation (Railways) No. 3 Act, 1962
1962	28	The Appropriation (No. 4) Act, 1962
1962	29	The Appropriation (Railways) No. 4 Act, 1962
1962	40	The Appropriation (Railways) No. 5 Act, 1962
1962	41	The Appropriation (No. 5) Act, 1962
1963	5	The Appropriation (Railways) Act, 1963
1963	6	The Appropriation (Railways) No. 2 Act, 1963
1963	7	The Appropriation Act, 1963
1963	9	The Appropriation (Vote on Account) Act, 1963
1963	12	The Appropriation (No. 2) Act, 1963
1963	16	The Appropriation (Railways) No. 3 Act, 1963
1963	17	The Appropriation (Railways) No. 4 Act, 1963
1963	18	The Appropriation (No. 3) Act, 1963
1963	25	The Appropriation (No. 4) Act, 1963
1963	31	The Appropriation (Railways) No. 5 Act, 1963
1963	44	The Appropriation (No. 5) Act, 1963
1963	46	The Appropriation (Railways) No. 6 Act, 1963
1964	1	The Appropriation (Railways) Act, 1964
1964	2	The Appropriation (Vote on Account) Act, 1964
1964	3	The Appropriation Act, 1964
1964	4	The Appropriation (Railways) No. 2 Act, 1964
1964	6	The Appropriation (No. 2) Act, 1964
1964	8	The Appropriation (No. 3) Act, 1964
1964	22	The Appropriation (No. 4) Act, 1964
1964	29	The Appropriation (No. 5) Act, 1964
1964	39	The Appropriation (No. 6) Act, 1964
1964	42	The Kerala Appropriation Act, 1964
1964	50	The Appropriation (Railways) No. 3 Act, 1964
1965	2	The Appropriation Act, 1965
1965	3	The Appropriation (Railways) Act, 1965
1965	4	The Appropriation (Railways) No. 2 Act, 1965
1965	5	The Appropriation (Vote on Account) Act, 1965
1965	7	The Kerala Appropriation Act, 1965
1965	8	The Kerala Appropriation (Vote on Account) Act, 1965
1965	11	The Appropriation (No. 2) Act, 1965
1965	13	The Kerala Appropriation (No. 2) Act, 1965
1965	24	The Kerala Appropriation (No. 3) Act, 1965
1965	25	The Kerala Appropriation (No. 4) Act, 1965
1965	26	The Appropriation (No. 3) Act, 1965
1965	27	The Appropriation (No. 4) Act, 1965
1965	28	The Appropriation (Railways) No. 3 Act, 1965
1965	29	The Appropriation (Railways) No. 4 Act, 1965
1965	37	The Appropriation (No. 5) Act, 1965
1965	43	The Kerala Appropriation (No. 5) Act, 1965
1966	5	The Appropriation (Vote on Account) Act, 1966
1966	6	The Appropriation Act, 1966
1966	7	The Appropriation (Railways) Act, 1966
1966	8	The Appropriation (Railways) No. 2 Act, 1966
1966	10	The Kerala Appropriation Act, 1966
1966	11	The Kerala Appropriation (Vote on Account) Act, 1966
1966	12	The Appropriation (No. 2) Act, 1966
1966	14	The Kerala Appropriation (No. 2) Act, 1966
1966	27	The Appropriation (No. 3) Act, 1966
1966	39	The Kerala Appropriation (No. 3) Act, 1966
1966	40	The Kerala Appropriation (No. 4) Act, 1966
1966	41	The Kerala Appropriation (No. 5) Act, 1966
1966	42	The Appropriation (Railways) No. 3 Act, 1966
1966	43	The Appropriation (Railways) No. 4 Act, 1966
1966	45	The Appropriation (No. 4) Act, 1966
1966	46	The Appropriation (No. 5) Act, 1966
1967	1	The Appropriation Act, 1967
1967	2	The Appropriation (Vote on Account) Act, 1967
1967	3	The Appropriation (Railways) Act, 1967
1967	4	The Appropriation (Railways) Vote on Account Act, 1967
1967	5	The Goa, Daman and Diu Appropriation Act, 1967
1967	6	The Goa, Daman and Diu Appropriation (Vote on Account) Act, 1967
1967	7	The Rajasthan Appropriation Act, 1967
1967	8	The Rajasthan Appropriation (Vote on Account) Act, 1967
1967	18	The Appropriation (Railways) No. 2 Act, 1967
1967	19	The Appropriation (No. 2) Act, 1967
1967	23	The Appropriation (Railways) No. 3 Act, 1967
1967	32	The Appropriation (No. 3) Act, 1967
1967	33	The Appropriation (No. 4) Act, 1967
1967	34	The Manipur Appropriation Act, 1967
1967	35	The Haryana Appropriation Act, 1967
1968	4	The Appropriation Act, 1968
1968	5	The Appropriation (Vote on Account) Act, 1968
1968	8	The Appropriation (Railways) Act, 1968
1968	9	The Appropriation (Railways) No. 2 Act, 1968
1968	11	The Haryana Appropriation Act, 1968
1968	12	The Haryana Appropriation (Vote on Account) Act, 1968
1968	13	The West Bengal Appropriation Act, 1968
1968	14	The West Bengal Appropriation (Vote on Account) Act, 1968
1968	15	The Uttar Pradesh Appropriation Act, 1968
1968	16	The Uttar Pradesh Appropriation (Vote on Account) Act, 1968
1968	18	The Appropriation (No. 2) Act, 1968
1968	20	The Uttar Pradesh Appropriation (No. 2) Act, 1968
1968	21	The West Bengal Appropriation (No. 2) Act, 1968
1968	37	The Appropriation (Railways) No. 3 Act, 1968
1968	38	The Appropriation (Railways) No. 4 Act, 1968
1968	40	The Bihar Appropriation Act, 1968
1968	41	The Appropriation (No. 3) Act, 1968
1968	42	The Appropriation (No. 4) Act, 1968
1968	43	The Uttar Pradesh Appropriation (No. 3) Act, 1968
1968	54	The Appropriation (Railways) No. 5 Act, 1968
1968	55	The Appropriation (Railways) No. 6 Act, 1968
1968	64	The Punjab Appropriation Act, 1968
1968	65	The Pondicherry Appropriation Act, 1968
1968	66	The Appropriation (No. 5) Act, 1968
1968	67	The Bihar Appropriation (No. 2) Act, 1968
1969	2	The Appropriation (Vote on Account) Act, 1969
1969	4	The Appropriation Act, 1969
1969	5	The Appropriation (No. 2) Act, 1969
1969	6	The Appropriation (Railways) Act, 1969
1969	7	The Appropriation (Railways) No. 2 Act, 1969
1969	13	The Appropriation (No. 3) Act, 1969
1969	29	The Appropriation (Railways) No. 3 Act, 1969
1969	30	The Appropriation (Railways) No. 4 Act, 1969
1969	31	The Appropriation (No. 4) Act, 1969
1969	48	The Appropriation (Railways) No. 5 Act, 1969
1969	49	The Appropriation (No. 5) Act, 1969
1969	50	The Appropriation (No. 6) Act, 1969
1969	51	The Manipur Appropriation Act, 1969
1969	52	The Bihar Appropriation Act, 1969
