= Kanan Kaushal =

Indian actress (born 1939)

- Born: Indumati Sheth; 21 March 1939 (age 87); Baroda State, India
- Other name: Indumati Paigankar
- Occupation: Actress
- Years active: 1963–1987
- Spouse: Shashikant Paigankar (m. 1964; died 2001)
- Children: 2

Indumati Paigankar (née Sheth), better known as Kanan Kaushal, is an Indian actress, most famous for starring in Jai Santoshi Maa (1975) and Pardesi. The low-budget film became a huge box office hit and a cultural phenomenon. She has acted in number of Marathi films like Pahuni, Bholi Bhabadi, Maan Apmaan, Ekati, Kartiki, Mama Bhache, Chandra Aahe Sakshila, LaxmanRekha and Shraddha. She has also acted in 16 Gujarati films, 4 Bhojpuri films, and 60 Hindi – Marathi films. She belongs to the "Gomantak Maratha" community and has acted in a number of Marathi plays.

== Filmography ==
| Year | Title | Role | Notes |
|---|---|---|---|
| 1966 | Budtameez | Beena | Hindi debut |
| 1969 | Sati Sulochana | Devi Maa Sita / Devi Maa Lakshmi | |
| 1970 | Dharati Na Chhoru | Nandu | Gujarati debut |
| 1970 | Pardesi | Savitri | |
| 1970 | Jigar Ane Ami | Ami | Gujarati film |
| 1971 | Ghunghat | Parvati | Gujarati film |
| 1971 | Mela | Santho | |
| 1972 | Gunsundari No Ghar Sansar | Gunsundari | |
| 1972 | Rut Rangeeli Ayee | Shanti 'Shanno' / Sharda | |
| 1972 | Yeh Gulistan Hamara | Mrs. Barua | |
| 1974 | Amdavad No Rikshawalo | Raj Maa | |
| 1974 | Hanuman Vijay | Chandrasena | |
| 1974 | Raja Shiv Chhatrapati | Saibai | Marathi film |
| 1974 | Bidaai | Pooja | |
| 1974 | Kartiki | Kartiki | Marathi film |
| 1975 | Balak Aur Janwar | Rani Roopmati | |
| 1975 | Jai Santoshi Maa | Satyavati | |
| 1975 | Maya Machhindra | Tilottama | |
| 1975 | Varat | Manjula | Marathi film |
| 1975 | Do Thug | Padma | |
| 1976 | Sati Jasma Odan | Jasma | |
| 1976 | Bhagwan Samaye Sansar Mein | Girija | |
| 1976 | Jai Mahalaxmi Maa | Mahalaxmi | |
| 1976 | Meera Shyam | Meera | |
| 1976 | Naag Champa | Rajkumari Ganga | |
| 1976 | Pahuni | Indu | Maharashtra State Film Award for Best Actress |
| 1977 | Jai Dwarkadheesh | Satyabhama / Chandrasena | |
| 1977 | Ram Bharose | Kamal | |
| 1978 | Jai Ganesh | Gauri | |
| 1978 | Karwa Chouth | Mangala | |
| 1978 | Chandra Hota Sakshila | Kanan | |
| 1979 | Ghar Ki Laaj | Ratna | |
| 1979 | Maan Apmaan | Parvati (Paro) | |
| 1980 | Sharan Tula Bhagwanta | Tai | |
| 1981 | Itni Si Baat | Meena | |
| 1982 | Sant Gyaneshwar | Rukmini | |
| 1982 | Bedard | | |
| 1982 | Nek Parveen | Nek Parveen | |
| 1983 | Dharti Aakash | | |
| 1984 | Jaag Utha Insan | Ramnarayan's wife | |
| 1984 | Love Marriage | Sarita Mehra | |
| 1984 | Shraddha | | |
| 1984 | Sage Soyare | Ramrao's wife | |
| 1986 | Qatil Aur Ashiq | | |
| 1986 | Bhagwaan Dada | Nirmaladevi (Mrs. Khan) | |
| 1987 | 108 Teerthyatra | Devi Maa Parvati | |
| 1987 | Inaam Dus Hazaar | Savitri Devi | |
| 1989 | Pyase Nain | Janaki | |
| 1989 | Toofan | Kanan | |
| 1990 | Awaragardi | Preeti Verma | |
| 1991 | Jigarwala | Laxmi Ranjeet Singh | |
| 1991 | Laal Paree | Shankar's mother | |
| 1991 | Kasam Kali Ki | Akram Khan's mother | |
| 1991 | Jeevan Daata | Sharda | |
| 1992 | Sanam Aap Ki Khatir | Maa | |
