= Versova =

Versova may refer to:

- Versova, Ghodbunder
- Versova, Greece, a town in Greece
- Versova, Mumbai, a neighbourhood in Mumbai
  - Versova (Vidhan Sabha constituency)
- Versova metro station in Mumbai
- Madh Fort, also known as Versova Fort, in northern Mumbai.
