= Pardesi (1970 film) =

1970 film

- Directed by: Kundan Kumar
- Produced by: Kundan Kumar
- Starring: Biswajeet; Mumtaz; Kanan Kaushal; Padma Khanna; Sujit Kumar
- Music by: Chitragupta
- Release date: 1970
- Country: India
- Language: Hindi

Pardesi (transl. Foreigner) is a 1970 Bollywood drama film directed by Kundan Kumar starring Biswajeet, Mumtaz, Kanan Kaushal, Padma Khanna and Sujit Kumar.

== Cast ==
- Biswajeet as Ajay
- Mumtaz as Maina
- Kanan Kaushal as Savitri
- Padma Khanna as Lajjo
- Sujit Kumar as Vijay
- Jeevan as Munim Dharampal
- Manmohan as Tikora
- Manmohan Krishna as Ustad
- Sulochana Latkar as Ajay & Vijay's Mother
- Jayshree T. as Cabaret Dancer

== Soundtrack ==
The film's music was composed by Chitragupta, with song lyrics by Majrooh Sultanpuri.

| Song | Singer |
|---|---|
| "Daka Dale Ho Daka Dale" | Lata Mangeshkar |
| "Lagi Na Chhutegi Pyar Men" | Lata Mangeshkar |
| "Mere Gore Ang Base Pyar" | Lata Mangeshkar |
| "Din Raat Jalen Ankhiyan, Karoon Yaad Teri Batiyan" | Lata Mangeshkar, Usha Mangeshkar |
| "Pardesi Piya, O Pardesi Piya, Mora Jiya Kahin Leke Chale Jaiyo To Na" | Mohammed Rafi, Asha Bhosle |
| "Kal Ki Kuch Adhuri Baaten" | Asha Bhosle |
