= Ameet Satam =

Indian politician

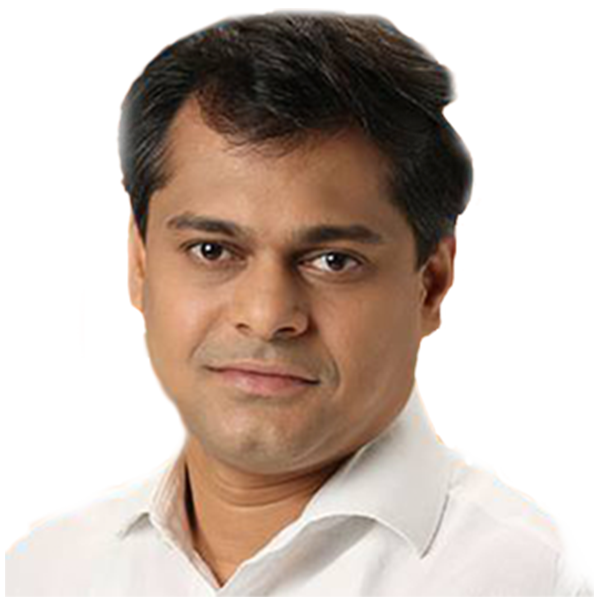

President of Bharatiya Janata Party – Mumbai
- Incumbent
- Assumed office 25 August 2025
- President: Ravindra Chavan
- Preceded by: Ashish Shelar

Member of Maharashtra Legislative Assembly
- Incumbent
- Assumed office 2014
- Preceded by: Ashok Jadhav
- Constituency: Andheri West

Personal details
- Born: 15 August 1976 (age 49) Mumbai, Maharashtra
- Political party: Bharatiya Janata Party
- Website: ameetsatam.com

Ameet Bhaskar Satam is a member of the 14th Maharashtra Legislative Assembly. He represents the Andheri West Assembly Constituency for the second term. He belongs to the Bharatiya Janata Party.
