= Bharati Lavekar =

Indian politician

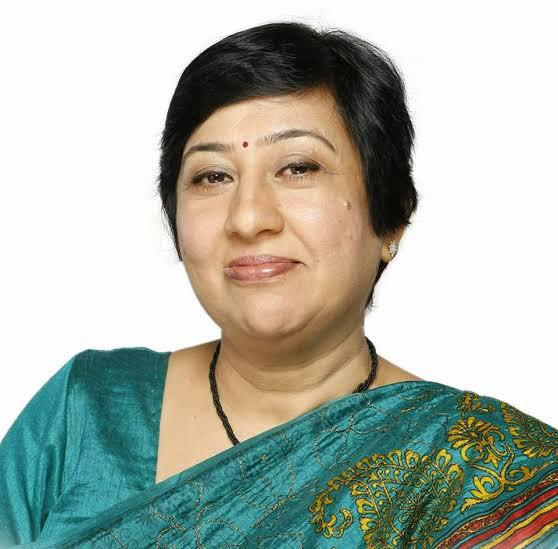

Former Member of Maharashtra Legislative Assembly
- Incumbent
- Assumed office 2014 - November 2024
- Preceded by: Haroon Khan
- Constituency: Versova

Personal details
- Party: Bharatiya Janata Party
- Education: Bachelor of Journalism, Masters in Political Science, PhD in uniform civil code
- Occupation: Politician, Social Worker, Social Activist

Bharati Hemant Lavekar is an Indian politician from the state of Maharashtra and member of the Shiv Sangram. She became former member of the Maharashtra Legislative Assembly for the first time in 2014 as a Bharatiya Janata Party candidate.

Bharati Lavekar is known for launching India's First Digital Sanitary Pad Bank. She also founded Tee Foundation that works to raise the level of menstrual hygiene in India.

== Early life ==
Bharati Lavekar was born in Marathwada, Maharashtra. She finished her Bachelor of Journalism from Marathwada University. She also procured Masters in Political Science and PhD in uniform civil code.

== Constituency ==
Lavekar was elected for the first time in 2014 from the Versova Assembly constituency in Maharashtra. She won against three term member of the Maharashtra Legislative Assembly Baldev Khosa from the Indian National Congress.

== Positions held ==
- 2014: Elected to Maharashtra Legislative Assembly (1st term)
- 2019: Re-elected to Maharashtra Legislative Assembly (2nd term)
- 2024: Shiv Sena (UBT) candidate Haroon Khan defeated her by 1600 votes.

== Awards ==
- First Lady Award honoured by the President of India in 2018
