= Hanuman Vijay =

1974 film by Babubhai Mistry

- Directed by: Babubhai Mistri
- Cinematography: A.D. Wadadekar
- Edited by: Ismail Sheikh
- Music by: Ajay Vishwanath
- Release date: 1974
- Country: India
- Language: Hindi

Hanuman Vijay is a 1974 Bollywood film directed by Babubhai Mistri.

== Plot ==
The story mainly revolves around Lord Hanuman, the relationship between his wife Makri and him, and how Hanuman helps Lord Ram and his younger brother Lakshman after Ahiravan kidnaps both brothers by Ravana's order.

== Cast ==
- Hercules as Hanuman
- Ashish Kumar as Shri Ram
- Kanan Kaushal as Chandrasena
- Sujata as Jal Makri
- Manher Desai as Ahiravan
- Raj Kumar as Lakshman

== Soundtrack ==
The music was composed by Ajay Vishwanath.

Track	Song	Singer(s)	Duration
1	"He Maiya Bhawani Re"	Suman Kalyanpur, Vani Jayaram	3:41
2	"Jai Jai Ram Jai Shri Ram"	Mohammed Rafi	5:34
3	"Kahe Dhunde Ram Ko"	Mohammed Rafi	4:10
4	"Prem Karoge Bolo Ji"	Asha Bhosle	2:59
