= Haroon Khan (Maharashtra politician) =

Indian politician (born 1962)

Haroon Rashid Khan (born 1962) is an Indian politician from Maharashtra. He is an MLA from Versova Assembly constituency in Mumbai Suburban district. He won the 2024 Maharashtra Legislative Assembly election representing the Shiv Sena (UBT). He is the first Muslim leader who is elected on Shiv Sena ticket in 25 years after Sabbir Sheikh, who won from Ambarnath assembly constituency in 1999 on undivided Shiv Sena ticket.

== Early life and education ==
Khan is from Versova, Mumbai Suburban district, Maharashtra. He is the son of Ismail Khan. He passed Class 10 and later discontinued his studies.

== Career ==
Khan made his electoral debut and became a first time MLA winning from Versova Assembly constituency representing Shiv Sena (UBT) in the 2024 Maharashtra Legislative Assembly election. He polled 65,396 votes and defeated his nearest rival and two time MLA, Bharati Lavekar of the Bharatiya Janata Party, by a margin of 1,600 votes.
