= Baldev Khosa =

Indian politician

Member of Maharashtra Legislative Assembly
- In office (2009–2014)
- Succeeded by: Bharati Lavekar
- Constituency: Versova

Maharashtra Legislative Assembly
- In office (1985-1990), (1999-2004), (2004 – 2009)
- Preceded by: Hafiz Yusuf
- Constituency: Amboli Assembly constituency

Personal details
- Party: Indian National Congress
- Children: 3
- Occupation: Politician, Film Actor

Baldev Khosa is an Indian film actor and politician from Maharashtra. He is a four term Member of the Maharashtra Legislative Assembly. He lost his seat in the 2014 election. He is most remembered for his role as Sukha in Punjabi film Putt Jattan De (1983).

== Family background and film career ==
Khosa originally hails from village Jhandeana in Moga district, Punjab.

== Political career ==
He was a close confidant of Sunil Dutt and entered politics with him for the first time when Dutt was elected to the Lok Sabha. Baldev Khosa was fielded from the then Amboli Assembly constituency in Mumbai to fight the state Assembly elections in February 1985 and won. He Lost the 1990 election and then he didn't contest the next state election from Versova Assembly constituency in 1995. In 1999, 2004 & 2009, he was consecutively elected to the Assembly. In 2014 and 2019, he lost the polls. He is a member of the Indian National Congress.

== Filmography ==
| Year | Film | Role | Language |
|---|---|---|---|
| 1985 | Maujaan Dubai Diyan | | Punjabi |
| 1983 | Sweekar Kiya Maine | Ajit Chhadha | Hindi |
| 1983 | Putt Jattan De | Sukha | Punjabi |
| 1981 | Professor Pyarelal | | Hindi |
| 1979 | Naiyya | Heera | Hindi |
| 1979 | Mahi Munda | Shera | Punjabi |
| 1978 | Chor Ho To Aisa | Police Inspector | Hindi |
| 1978 | Namaskar | | Hindi |
| 1978 | Udeekan | | Punjabi |
| 1977 | Chaalu Mera Naam | | Hindi |
| 1977 | Wangaar | Baldev 'Balli' | Punjabi |
| 1976 | Raeeszada | | Hindi |
| 1975 | Badnaam | Shamu | Hindi |
| 1975 | Balak Aur Janwar | Chander | Hindi |
| 1975 | Gupt Shastra | Umesh | Hindi |
| 1974 | Thokar | Shyamu | Hindi |
| 1973 | Intezaar | | Hindi |
| 1973 | Prabhat | | Hindi |
| 1972 | Darar | | Hindi |
| 1971 | Sansar | Shyam | Hindi |
| 1970 | Umang | | Hindi |
| 1969 | Bandish | | Hindi |
| 1969 | Satyakam | Sikh Gentleman | Hindi |

== Offices held ==
- Maharashtra Legislative Assembly
- Terms in office:1985-1990, 1999-2004, 2004–2009 and 2009-2014.
