= Rutuja Latke =

Indian politician

Rutuja Ramesh Latke is an Indian politician who is elected as Member of 14th Maharashtra Legislative Assembly in 2022 Legislative Assembly by-elections from Andheri East Assembly constituency. She is the spouse of Ramesh Latke.
