= Ashok Jadhav =

Indian politician

Ashok Jadhav is an Indian National Congress politician and was a member of the Maharashtra Legislative Assembly between 2009 and 2014, elected from Andheri West.
