= Gajanan Kirtikar =

Indian politician

Gajanan Chandrakant Kirtikar

Leader of Shiv Sena, Lok Sabha
- In office 23 March 2023 – 4 June 2024
- Preceded by: Sanjay Raut
- Succeeded by: Shrikant Shinde

Member of Parliament, Lok Sabha
- In office (2014-2019), (2019 – 2024)
- Preceded by: Gurudas Kamat
- Succeeded by: Ravindra Waikar
- Constituency: Mumbai North West

Cabinet Minister for Information, Public Relations and Transport, Maharashtra
- In office (1998–1999)

Minister of State for Home, Tourism, Maharashtra
- In office (1995–1998)

Member of Maharashtra Legislative Assembly
- In office (1990-1995), (1995-1999), (1999-2004), (2004 – 2009)
- Preceded by: Datta Chaulkar
- Constituency: Malad Vidhansabha

Personal details
- Born: 3 September 1943 (age 83) Karwar, Bombay Province, British India
- Party: Shiv Sena
- Children: 1 (Amol Kirtikar)
- Website: gajanankirtikar.com

Gajanan Kirtikar is Leader of Shivsena and a Member of Parliament (MP) from Mumbai North West (Lok Sabha constituency) in Mumbai, Maharashtra, India. He has been a Member of Legislative Assembly from Malad assembly constituency in Mumbai from 1990 to 2009. He was state minister for Home in Shiv Sena-Bharatiya Janata Party Government.

He has been elected to the lower house of the Parliament of India. In the 2014 General elections (16th Lok Sabha), he defeated Gurudas Kamat, by a margin of approximately 1,83,028 votes, to win from the Mumbai North West constituency in Maharashtra. In the 2019 General elections (17th Lok Sabha), he defeated Sanjay Nirupam, by a margin of 2,60,328 votes.

== Positions held ==
- 1990: Elected to Maharashtra Legislative Assembly (1st term)
- 1995: Re-elected to Maharashtra Legislative Assembly (2nd term)
- 1995-98: Minister of State for Home, Tourism, Maharashtra
- 1998-99: Cabinet Minister for Information, Public Relations and Transport, Maharashtra State
- 1999: Re-elected to Maharashtra Legislative Assembly (3rd term)
- 2004: Re-elected to Maharashtra Legislative Assembly (4th term)
- 2006: President, Sthaniy Lokadhikar Samiti Mahasangha
- 2007 Onwards: Leader, Shiv Sena
- 2010: President, Mumbai Upnagar Kabaddi Association
- 2014: Elected to 16th Lok Sabha
- 2019: Elected to 17th Lok Sabha
- 2023: Appointed as Shiv Sena's leader of Parliamentary Party

== See also ==
- Manohar Joshi ministry
- Narayan Rane ministry
