= Ravindra Waikar =

Indian politician

Member of Parliament, Lok Sabha
- Incumbent
- Assumed office 4 June 2024
- Preceded by: Gajanan Kirtikar
- Constituency: Mumbai North West

Member of Maharashtra Legislative Assembly
- In office October 2009 – 4 June 2024
- Constituency: Jogeshwari East

Minister of state Housing, Higher & Technical Education Government of Maharashtra
- In office 5 December 2014 – November 2019
- Governor: C. Vidyasagar Rao

Personal details
- Born: 18 January 1959 (age 67)
- Party: Shiv Sena (2022-present)
- Spouse: Manisha Waikar
- Children: 2 (Dipti, Prajakta)
- Occupation: Politician
- Website: http://www.ravindrawaikar.com

Ravindra Waikar is a Shiv Sena politician from Maharashtra. He is a Member of Parliament from Mumbai North West. He was also a member of the 14th Maharashtra Legislative Assembly representing Jogeshwari East Assembly Constituency. He has been elected to Vidhan Sabha for three consecutive terms in 2009, 2014 and 2019. He was appointed Maharashtra's minister of state, Higher & Technical Education in December 2014. He was given the Housing, Higher & Technical Education portfolio. He was also given responsibility of being guardian minister of Ratnagiri district.

== Positions held ==
- 1992: Elected as corporator in Brihanmumbai Municipal Corporation (1st term)
- 1997: Re-elected as corporator in Brihanmumbai Municipal Corporation (2nd term)
- 2002: Re-elected as corporator in Brihanmumbai Municipal Corporation (3rd term)
- 2007: Re-elected as corporator in Brihanmumbai Municipal Corporation (4th term)
- 2006–2010: Standing Committee Chairman Brihanmumbai Municipal Corporation
- 2009: Elected to Maharashtra Legislative Assembly
- 2014: Re-elected to Maharashtra Legislative Assembly
- 2014 - 2019: Minister of state Housing, Higher & Technical Education in Maharashtra State Government
- 2014–2019: Guardian minister of Ratnagiri District
- 2019–2024: Re-elected to Maharashtra Legislative Assembly
- 2024: Member of Parliament from Mumbai North West

== See also ==
- Devendra Fadnavis ministry

Political offices
Preceded by	Minister of State for Housing, Higher Education; Maharashtra State; December 2014–present	Incumbent
Preceded by Bhaskar Jadhav	Maharashtra State Guardian Minister for Ratnagiri district December 2014–present	Incumbent
