= Vidya Thakur =

Indian politician

MLA Vidya Thakur

Minister Of State Women and Child Development Government of Maharashtra
- In office 31 October 2014 – 24 October 2019

Member of the Maharashtra Legislative Assembly for Goregaon
- Incumbent
- Assumed office 2014
- Preceded by: Subhash Desai

Deputy Mayor of Mumbai
- In office 2007–2009

Personal details
- Born: 15 June 1963 (age 62)
- Party: Bharatiya Janata Party
- Spouse: Jaiprkash Thakur
- Occupation: Politician
- Website: http://www.mahabjp.org Maharashtra BJP Official Page

Vidya Jaiprakash Thakur (born 15 June 1963) is an Indian politician from Maharashtra. She is a three time MLA and a member of 13th Maharashtra Legislative Assembly from Goregaon representing the Bharatiya Janata Party from Goregaon Assembly constituency. She was a Minister of State for Women and Child Development, Food and Civil Supplies and Consumer Protection, Food and Drugs Administration in Devendra Fadnavis Ministry.

== Early life and education ==
Thakur is from Goregaon, Mumbai Suburban district, Maharashtra. She married Jaiprakash C Thakur. She studied Class 8 at Kudilal Govindram Sekseria Sarvadaya School and passed the examinations in 1977.

== Career ==
Thakur made her electoral debut winning the Brihanmumbai Municipal Corporation elections as a member in 1992 and she became a deputy mayor on 17 March 2007.

She became an MLA for the first time winning the 2014 Maharashtra Legislative Assembly election and retained the Goregaon Assembly constituency representing Bharatiya Janata Party in the 2019 Maharashtra Legislative Assembly election and won for a third consecutive time in the 2024 Maharashtra Legislative Assembly election. In 2024, she polled 96,364 votes and defeated her nearest rival, Sameer Desai of Shiv Sena (UBT), by a margin of 23,961 votes.

=== Positions held ===
==== Within BJP ====
- Ex. General Secretary BJP Mumbai Mahila Morcha

==== Legislative ====
- Brihanmumbai Municipal Corporation 2007
- Ex.Public Health Committee Chairperson
- Deputy Mayor, Brihanmumbai Municipal Corporation on 17 March 2007
- Member, Maharashtra Legislative Assembly - since 2014

== See also ==
- Devendra Fadnavis ministry (2014–)
- Make in Maharashtra

Political offices
Preceded by	Minister of State for Women and Child Development, Food and Civil Supplies, Food and Drug Administration; Maharashtra State; December 2014–present	Incumbent
