= Parle Andheri Assembly constituency =

Constituency of the Maharashtra legislative assembly in India

Parle Andheri
- Former constituency for the Maharashtra Legislative Assembly

Constituency details
- Country: India
- Region: Western India
- State: Maharashtra
- Established: 1955
- Abolished: 1964
- Total electors: 119,190
- Reservation: None

Parle Andheri Assembly constituency was an assembly constituency in the India state of Maharashtra.

== Members of the Legislative Assembly ==
| Election | Member | Party |
|---|---|---|
| 1957 | Shantilal Harjivan Shah | Indian National Congress |
| 1962 | Shantilal Harjivan Shah | Indian National Congress |

== Election results ==
=== Assembly Election 1962 ===
1962 Maharashtra Legislative Assembly election : Parle Andheri
| Party | Candidate | Votes | % | ±% |
|---|---|---|---|---|
| INC | Shantilal Harijivan Shah | 34,349 | 46.23% | ▼10.88 |
| CPI | Balkrishana Shantaram Dhume | 29,127 | 39.20% | New |
| ABJS | Sureshchandra Gendalal Cheturvedi | 7,916 | 10.65% | New |
| Socialist | Tulsidas Dayalji Boda | 2,916 | 3.92% | New |
| Margin of victory | | 5,222 | 7.03% | ▼7.18 |
| Turnout | | 77,369 | 64.91% | ▼2.82 |
| Total valid votes | | 74,308 | | |
| Registered electors | | 1,19,190 | | ▲60.23 |
| INC hold | | Swing | ▼10.88 | |

=== Assembly Election 1957 ===
1957 Bombay State Legislative Assembly election : Parle Andheri
| Party | Candidate | Votes | % | ±% |
|---|---|---|---|---|
| INC | Shah Shantilal Harjivan | 28,771 | 57.10% | New |
| PSP | Dhurandhar Anandrao Sadashiv | 21,613 | 42.90% | New |
| Margin of victory | | 7,158 | 14.21% | |
| Turnout | | 50,384 | 67.73% | |
| Total valid votes | | 50,384 | | |
| Registered electors | | 74,387 | | |
| INC win (new seat) | | | | |
