= Vile Parle Andheri Versova Assembly constituency =

Constituency of the Maharashtra legislative assembly in India

Vile Parle Andheri Versova
- Former constituency for the Maharashtra Legislative Assembly

Constituency details
- Country: India
- Region: Western India
- State: Maharashtra
- Established: 1951
- Abolished: 1955
- Total electors: 53,501
- Reservation: None

Vile Parle Andheri Versova Assembly constituency was an assembly constituency in the India state of Maharashtra.

== Members of the Legislative Assembly ==
Election	Member	Party
1952	Shah, Shantilal Harjivan	Indian National Congress

== Election results ==
=== Assembly Election 1952 ===
1952 Bombay State Legislative Assembly election : Vile Parle Andheri Versova
Party	Candidate	Votes	%	±%
INC	Shah, Shantilal Harjivan	12,373	44.88%	New
Socialist	Parekh, Abdusatar Musa	7,606	27.59%	New
Independent	Gawde, Gangaram Govind	2,745	9.96%	New
Independent	Vora, Jaggannath Damodar	2,183	7.92%	New
Independent	Sharma, Jwalaprasad	1,871	6.79%	New
Independent	Desai, Mukund Narsilal	429	1.56%	New
Independent	Mody, Gokuldas Jadhavji	364	1.32%	New
Margin of victory		4,767	17.29%	
Turnout		27,571	51.53%	
Total valid votes		27,571		
Registered electors		53,501		
INC win (new seat)				
