= Suresh Shetty =

Indian politician

MLA, Minister
- Constituency: Andheri, Mumbai

Personal details
- Born: 2 September 1955 (age 70)
- Party: Indian National Congress
- Website: http://www.sureshshettymin.com

Suresh Hirayenna Shetty was a Member of the Legislative Assembly from the Andheri (east) constituency and Minister of Health in the Maharashtra government of Cabinet rank.

== Political career ==
He is Tuluva bunt from Mangalore, joined the Indian National Congress in 1975 and has been an active member ever since. He is currently also the general secretary of the Pradesh congress committee. He began his political career as a student leader in Mumbai University. However, he has since been elected thrice as MLA from the Andheri East constituency.
