= List of mayors of Mumbai =

Ceremonial leader of Mumbai, India

Mayor of Mumbai
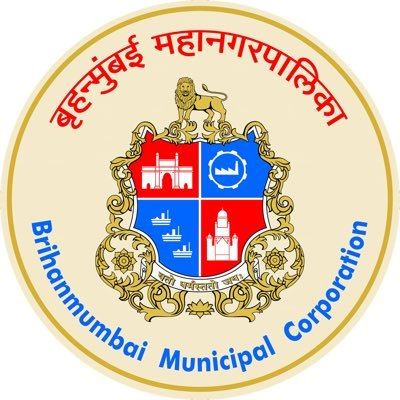
- Seal of the Brihanmumbai Municipal Corporation

- Incumbent; Ritu Tawde since 7 February 2026
- Style: Mr./Mrs. Mayor, Worshipful Mayor
- Appointer: Chief Minister
- Term length: 2.5 years
- Formation: 1931; 95 years ago
- Website: Official website

The Mayor of Mumbai is the elected chief of the Municipal Corporation of Greater Mumbai. The mayor is the first citizen of the city. The role is largely ceremonial as the real powers are vested in the Municipal Commissioner. The Mayor plays a decorative role of representing and upholding the dignity of the city and a functional role in deliberating over the discussions in the corporation.

== History of the office ==
The designation of the President of the Municipal Corporation of Bombay was changed into that of His Lordship the 'Mayor', Bombay Municipal Corporation from November 1931.

The precursor to the designation of Mayor were President (1887–1931) and Chairman (1873–1887).

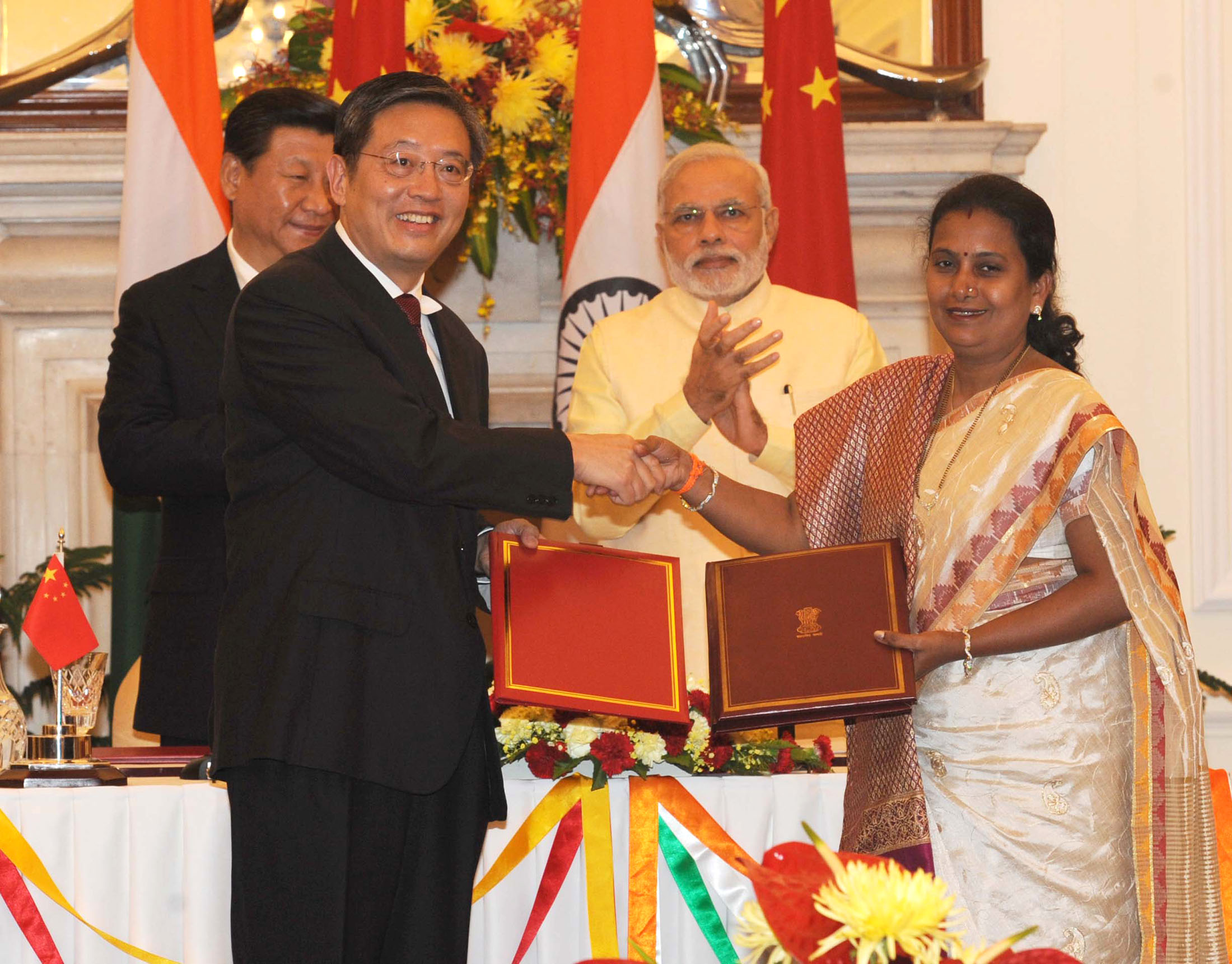
Smt. Snehal Ambekar, Mayor of Mumbai from 2014 to 2017 (first person on the right), and the Executive Vice Mayor of Shanghai at an agreement signing ceremony, with the Indian Prime Minister and the Chinese President in the background.

== Election of the mayor ==
The mayor is elected from within the ranks of the council in a quinquennial election. The elections are conducted in all 227 wards in the city to elect corporators. The party that wins the maximum number of seats holds an internal voting to decide the mayor. If no party or coalition can garner majority to select a mayor from amongst themselves for more than 1 month after general municipality elections or if the office of mayor becomes vacant for any reason mid term and still remains vacant for more than 2 months due to the first said reason, then a general election is held within the municipality for people to directly elect an executive mayor, to serve till end of term of the municipal house.

The tenure of the mayor is 2.5 years or till dissolution of municipal corporation, either by themselves or by state law.

== Mayors of Mumbai ==
#	Portrait	Name	Tenure			Election	Party
1		J. B. Boman Behram	1931	1932			
2		V. N. Chandavarkar	1932	1933			
3		Moreshwar Chintaman Javle	1933	1934			
4		Hoosenally Rahimtoola	1934	1935			
5		Khurshed Nariman	1935	1936			
6		Jamnadas M. Mehta	1936	1937			
7		Elijah Moses Rajpurker	1937	1938			
8		Sultan Meherally Chinoy	1938	1939			
9		Behram N. Karanjia	1939	1940			
10		Mathooradas Tricamjee	1940	1941			
11		Joseph A. Collaco	1941	1942			
12		Yusuf Meherally	1942	1943			
13		M. D. D. Gilder	1943	1943			
14		Minoo Masani	1943	1944			
15		Nagindas T. Master	1944	1945			
16		Joseph Alban D'Souza	1945	1946			
17		Mohamedbhoy I. M. Rowjee	1946	1947			
18		A. P. Sabavala	1947	1948			
19		M. U. Mascarenhas	1948	1949			
20		S. K. Patil	1949	1952			
21		Ganpatishankar N. Desai	1952	1953			
22		P. A. Dias	1953	1954			
23		Dahyabhai Patel	1954	1955			
24		N. C. Pupala	1955	1956			
25		Sulochana Modi	1956	1956			
26		Abdul Kader Salebhoy	1956	1957			
27		Simon C. Fernandes	1957	1957			
28		M. V. Donde	1957	1958			
29		S. S. Mirajkar	1958	1959			
30		P. T. Borale	1959	1960			
31		Vishnuprasad N. Desai	1960	1961			
32		V. B. Worlikar	1961	1962			
33		N. N. Shah	1962	1963			
34		E. A. Bandookwala	1963	1964			
35		B. P. Divgi	1964	1965			
36		M. Madhavan	1965	1966			
37		S. R. Patkar	1966	1967			
38		J. Leon D'Souza	1967	1968			
39		R. N. Kulkarni	1968	1969			
40		J. K. Joshi	1969	1970			
41		S. G. Patel	1970	1971			
42		Hemchandra Gupte	1971	1972			Shiv Sena
43		R. K. Ganatra	1972	1973			
44		Sudhir Joshi	1973	1974			Shiv Sena
45		B. K. Boman-Behram	1974	1975			
46		N. D. Mehta	1975	1976			
47		Manohar Joshi	1976	1977			Shiv Sena
48		Murli Deora	1977	1978			Indian National Congress
49		Wamanrao Mahadik	1978	1978			Shiv Sena
50		Rajbhau Chimbulkar	1978	1980			Janata Party
51		Baburao H. Shete	1980	1981			
52		A. U. Memon	1981	1982			
53		Prabhakar Pai	1982	1983			Bharatiya Janata Party
54		M. H. Bedi	1983	1984			
55		Chhagan Bhujbal	1985	1986			Shiv Sena
56		Dattaji Nalawade	1986	1987			Shiv Sena
57		Ramesh Prabhoo	1987	1988			Shiv Sena
58		C. S. Padwal	1988	1989			Shiv Sena
59		Sharad N. Acharya	1989	1990			Shiv Sena
(55)		Chhagan Bhujbal	1990	1991			Shiv Sena
60		Diwakar Raote	1991	1992			Shiv Sena
61		Chandrakant Handore	1992	1993			Republican Party of India
62		R. R. Singh	1993	1994			Indian National Congress
63		Nirmala Samant Prabhavalkar	1994	1995			Indian National Congress
64		R. T. Kadam	1995	1996			Indian National Congress
65		Milind Vaidya	1996	1997			Shiv Sena
66		Vishakha Raut	1997	1998		1997	Shiv Sena
67		Nandu Satam	1998	1999		1997	Shiv Sena
68		Hareshwar Patil	29 April 1999	5 March 2002	2 years, 313 days	1997	Shiv Sena
69		Mahadeo Deole	6 March 2002	17 February 2005	2 years, 348 days	2002	Shiv Sena
70		Datta Dalvi	18 February 2005	9 March 2007	2 years, 19 days	2002	Shiv Sena
71		Shubha Raul	10 March 2007	30 November 2009	2 years, 265 days	2007	Shiv Sena
72		Shraddha Jadhav	1 December 2009	8 March 2012	2 years, 98 days	2007	Shiv Sena
73		Sunil Prabhu	9 March 2012	8 September 2014	2 years, 183 days	2012	Shiv Sena
74		Snehal Ambekar	9 September 2014	8 March 2017	2 years, 180 days	2012	Shiv Sena
75		Vishwanath Mahadeshwar	9 March 2017	21 November 2019	2 years, 257 days	2017	Shiv Sena
76		Kishori Pednekar	22 November 2019	8 March 2022	2 years, 106 days	2017	Shiv Sena
–		Vacant	8 March 2022	7 February 2026	3 years, 340 days	–	
77		Ritu Tawde	7 February 2026	Incumbent	269 days	2026	Bharatiya Janata Party

== See also ==
- Mayors of Indian Cities
- Brihanmumbai Municipal Corporation
- Municipal Corporation Building, Mumbai (for details on the buildings architecture)
- Coat of arms of Mumbai
- Administrative divisions of Mumbai
- Municipal Commissioner of Mumbai
- Sheriff of Mumbai
