= 2012 Brihanmumbai Municipal Corporation election =

Local elections in Maharashtra

← 2007	16 February 2012	2017 →

All 227 seats in the Brihanmumbai Municipal Corporation 114 seats needed for a majority

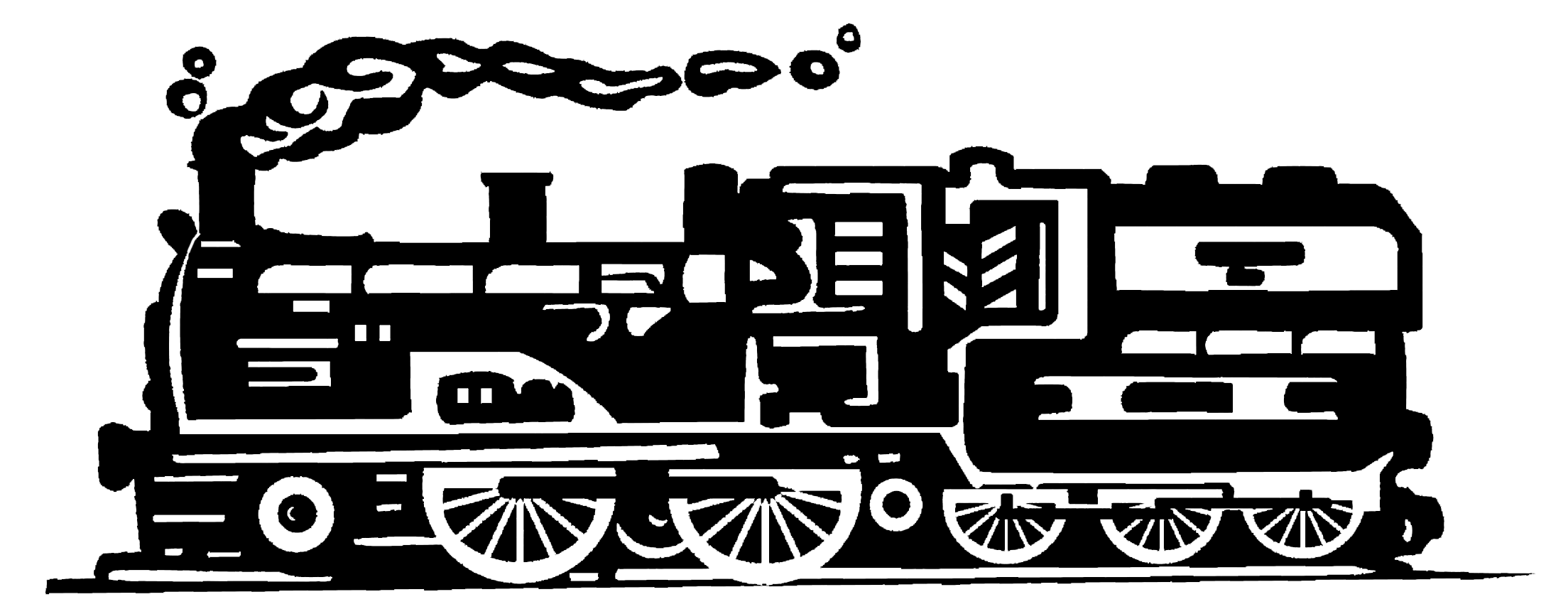

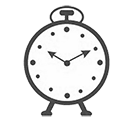
	First party	Second party	Third party
Party	SS	INC	BJP
Last election	82	76	28
Seats won	75	52	31
Seat change	▼7	▼24	▲3
	Fourth party	Fifth party
Party	MNS	NCP
Last election	7	14
Seats won	28	13
Seat change	▲21	▼1

The Brihanmumbai Mahanagar Palika election, 2012 (Brihanmumbai Municipal Corporation election, 2012) was an election of members to the Brihanmumbai Municipal Corporation which took place on 16 February 2012.

== Result ==
The ruling Shiv Sena-BJP-Republican Party of India (Athavale) alliance won the elections. Sunil Prabhu was elected Mayor of Mumbai.

Party	Seats
Shiv Sena	75
Bharatiya Janata Party	31
Indian National Congress	52
Nationalist Congress Party	13
Maharashtra Navnirman Sena	28
Others	28
Total	227

== See also ==
- 2012 Maharashtra local elections
- Mayor of Mumbai
