= Dalvi =

Family name

The Dalvi is an Indian surname derived from the name of a clan found among the Saraswat Brahmin, Maratha, Agri, Koli and Pathare Prabhu communities of Maharashtra.

== People with the name ==
- John Dalvi (1920–1974), Indian Army officer
- Datta Dalvi, Indian politician
- Jaywant Dalvi (1925–1994), Indian Marathi-language writer
- Jaswantarao Dalvi, ruler of Palval, a small principality under the Sultanates of Deccan (1662)
- Madhav Dalvi (1925–2012), Indian cricketer
- Michael Dalvi (born 1945), Indian cricketer, son of John Dalvi
- Shireen Dalvi, Indian journalist
- Sudhir Dalvi (born 1939), Indian actor
- Tushar Dalvi, Indian actor
