= 2017 Brihanmumbai Municipal Corporation election =

Local elections in Maharashtra

- 21 February 2017

All 227 seats in the Brihanmumbai Municipal Corporation 114 seats needed for a majority
- Turnout: ▼55.53 %

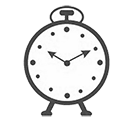

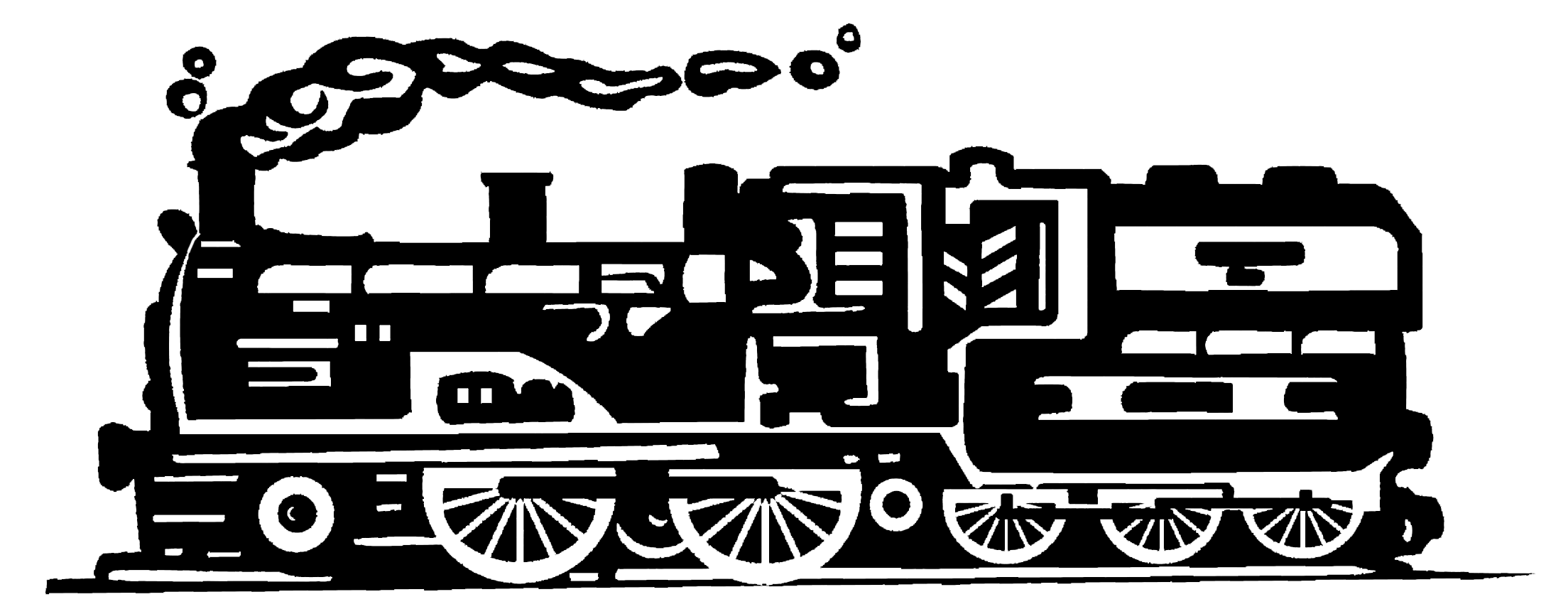

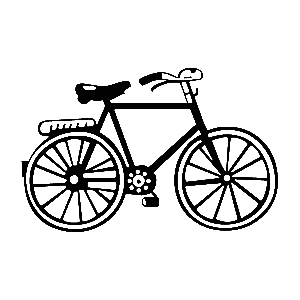

	First party	Second party	Third party
Party	SS	BJP	INC
Last election	75	31	52
Seats won	84	82	31
Seat change	▲9	▲51	▼21
	Fourth party	Fifth party	Sixth party
Party	NCP	MNS	SP
Last election	13	28
Seats won	9	7	6
Seat change	▼4	▼21	▲6
	Seventh party
Party	AIMIM
Seats won	2
Seat change	▲2
BMC majority before election
SHS
Elected BMC majority
SHS

The Brihanmumbai Municipal Corporation election, 2017 was an election of members to the Brihanmumbai Municipal Corporation which governs Greater Mumbai, the largest city in India. It took place on 21 February 2017. Total Voters was 91,80,653. total BMC Corporators number is 227.

== Schedule ==
Brihanmumbai Mahanagar Palika election was held on 21 February 2017 in a single phase. Results were announced on 23 February 2017.

== Result ==
The ruling Shiv Sena was voted as the largest party in elections. The BJP did immensely well by jumping from 31 to 82 seats. No Party could get a clear majority, however, later BJP supported Shiv Sena for the Mayor post. Indian National Congress had fallen to 31 seats, while Maharashtra Navnirman Sena dropped to 7 seats.

Party	Seats	Seat Change	Alliance-wise
Shiv Sena	84	▲9	166
Bharatiya Janata Party	82	▲51	166
Indian National Congress	31	▼21	40
Nationalist Congress Party	9	▼4	40
Maharashtra Navnirman Sena	7	▼21	
Samajwadi Party	6	▲6	
All India Majlis-e-Ittehadul Muslimeen	2	▲2	
Akhil Bharatiya Sena	1	▼1	
Independent	5		
Total	227		

== Result by wards ==
#	Constituency	Corporator	Party
1	R/North Ward	Tejasvee Ghosalkar	Shiv Sena
2	R/North Ward	Jagdish Ojha	BJP
3	R/North Ward	Balkrishna Brid	Shiv Sena
4	R/North Ward	Sujata Patekar	Shiv Sena
5	R/North Ward	Sanjay Ghadi	Shiv Sena
6	R/North Ward	Harshal Kakkar	Shiv Sena
7	R/North Ward	Sheetal Mahatre	Shiv Sena
8	R/Central Ward	Harish Chheda	BJP
9	R/Central Ward	Sweta Sharad Korgaonkar	Congress
10	R/Central Ward	Jitendra Ambalal Patel	BJP
11	R/Central Ward	Riddhi Khurluge	Shiv Sena
12	R/Central Ward	Geeta Singal	Shiv Sena
13	R/Central Ward	Vidyarthi Singh	BJP
14	R/Central Ward	Asawari Patil	BJP
15	R/Central Ward	Pravin Shah	BJP
16	R/Central Ward	Anjali Khedekar	BJP
17	R/Central Ward	Beena Doshi	BJP
18	R/South Ward	Sandhya Doshi	Shiv Sena
19	R/South Ward	Shubhada Gudekar	Shiv Sena
20	R/South Ward	Deepak Tawade	BJP
21	R/South Ward	Shailaja Girkar	BJP
22	R/South Ward	Priyanka More	BJP
23	R/South Ward	Shiv Kumar Jha	BJP
24	R/South Ward	Sunita Yadav	BJP
25	R/South Ward	Madhuri Bhoir	Shiv Sena
26	R/South Ward	Pritam Pandagle	BJP
27	R/South Ward	Surekha Patil	BJP
28	R/South Ward	Rajpati Yadav	Congress
29	P/North Ward	Thakur Sagar Singh	BJP
30	P/North Ward	Leena Patil Deherkar	BJP
31	P/North Ward	Kamlesh Yadav	BJP
32	P/North Ward	Steffi Kini	Congress
33	P/North Ward	Virendra Chowdhary	Congress
34	P/North Ward	Kamarjaha Siddique	Congress
35	P/North Ward	Sejal Desai	BJP
36	P/North Ward	Daksha Patel	BJP
37	P/North Ward	Pratibha Shinde	BJP
38	P/North Ward	Aatmaram Chache	Shiv Sena
39	P/North Ward	Vinaya Vishnu Sawant	Shiv Sena
40	P/North Ward	Suhas Wadkar	Shiv Sena
41	P/North Ward	Tulshiram Dhondiba Shinde	Independent
42	P/North Ward	Dhanashree Bharadkar	NCP
43	P/North Ward	Vinod Mishra	BJP
44	P/North Ward	Sangita Dnyanmurti Mishra	BJP
45	P/South Ward	Ram Barod	BJP
46	P/South Ward	Yogita Sunil Koli	BJP
47	P/South Ward	Jaya Tiwana	BJP
48	P/South Ward	Salma Almelkar	Congress
49	P/South Ward	Sangita Sutar	Shiv Sena
50	P/South Ward	Deepak Thakur	BJP
51	P/South Ward	Swapnil Mohan Tembwalkar	Shiv Sena
52	P/South Ward	Priti Satam	BJP
53	K/West Ward	Rekha Ramvanshi	Shiv Sena
54	K/West Ward	Sadhna Mande	Shiv Sena
55	K/West Ward	Harsh Patel	BJP
56	K/West Ward	Rajul Sameer Desai	BJP
57	K/West Ward	Shrikalla Pillai	BJP
58	K/West Ward	Sandip Patel	BJP
59	K/West Ward	Pratibha Khopde	Shiv Sena
60	K/West Ward	Yogiraj Dabhadkar	BJP
61	K/West Ward	Rajul Patel	Shiv Sena
62	K/West Ward	Changez Multani	Independent
63	K/West Ward	Ranjana Patil	BJP
64	K/West Ward	Shahida Haroon Khan	Shiv Sena
65	K/West Ward	Alpha Ashok Jadhav	Congress
66	K/East Ward	Meher Mohsin Haider	Congress
67	K/East Ward	Sudha Singh	BJP
68	K/East Ward	Rohan Rathod	BJP
69	K/East Ward	Renu Hansraj	BJP
70	K/East Ward	Sunita Mehta	BJP
71	K/East Ward	Anish Makhwani	BJP
72	K/East Ward	Pankaj Yadav	BJP
73	K/East Ward	Pravin Shinde	Shiv Sena
74	K/East Ward	Ujjawala Modak	BJP
75	K/East Ward	Priyanka Sawant	Shiv Sena
76	K/East Ward	Kesarben Murji Patel	BJP
77	K/East Ward	Anant Nar	Shiv Sena
78	K/East Ward	Sofi Jabbar	NCP
79	K/East Ward	Sadanand Parab	Shiv Sena
80	K/East Ward	Sunil Yadav	BJP
81	H/East Ward	Murji Patel	BJP
82	H/East Ward	Amin Jagdhish Kutti (Anna)	Congress
83	H/East Ward	Vinnie D’souza	Congress
84	H/East Ward	Abhijeet Samant	BJP
85	H/East Ward	Jyoti Parag Alavani	BJP
86	H/East Ward	Sushma Kamlesh Rai	Congress
87	H/East Ward	Vishwanath Mahadeshwar	Shiv Sena
88	H/East Ward	Sada Parab	Shiv Sena
89	H/East Ward	Dinesh Kubal	Shiv Sena
90	H/East Ward	Tulip Miranda	Congress
91	H/East Ward	Sagun Naik	Shiv Sena
92	H/West Ward	Bulnaaz Kureshi	AIMIM
93	H/West Ward	Rohini Kamble	Shiv Sena
94	H/West Ward	Pradnya Bhutkar	Shiv Sena
95	H/West Ward	Shekhar Vaingankar	Shiv Sena
96	H/West Ward	Mohammed Halim Shamim Sheikh	Shiv Sena
97	H/West Ward	Hetal Vimal Gala	BJP
98	T Ward	Alka Subhash Kerkar	BJP
99	T Ward	Sanjay Gulabrao Agaldare	Shivsena
100	T Ward	Swapna Mhatre	BJP
101	T Ward	Asif Ahmed Zakaria	Congress
102	T Ward	Mumtaz Rahebar Khan	Independent
103	S Ward	Manoj Kotak	BJP
104	S Ward	Prakash Kashinath Gangadhare	BJP
105	S Ward	Rajani Naresh Keni	BJP
106	S Ward	Prabhakar Tukaram Shinde	BJP
107	S Ward	Samita Vinod Kamble	BJP
108	T Ward	Neil Kirit Somaiya	BJP
109	S Ward	Deepali Gosavi	Shiv Sena
110	S Ward	Asha Koparkar	Congress
111	S Ward	Sakshi Deepak Dalvi	BJP
112	S Ward	Sakshi Deepak Dalvi	BJP
113	S Ward	Deepmala Badhe	Shiv Sena
114	S Ward	Ramesh Korhaonkar	Shiv Sena
115	S Ward	Umesh Mane	Shiv Sena
116	S Ward	Pramila Patil	Congress
117	N Ward	Suvarna Karanje	Shiv Sena
118	N Ward	Upendra Sawant	Shiv Sena
119	N Ward	Manisha Harishchandra Rahate	NCP
120	N Ward	Rajeshree Redkar	Shiv Sena
121	N Ward	Chandravati More	Shiv Sena
122	N Ward	Vaishali Patil	BJP
123	N Ward	SNEHAL SUNIL MORE	Independent
124	N Ward	Jyoti Khan	NCP
125	N Ward	Rupali Sudesh	Shiv Sena
126	N Ward	Archana Bhalerao	MNS
127	N Ward	Suresh Patil	Shiv Sena
128	N Ward	Ashwini Deepak Hande	Shiv Sena
129	M/East Ward	Suryakant Gavli	BJP
130	M/East Ward	Bindu Chetan Trivedi	BJP
131	M/East Ward	Rakhee Harishchandra Jadhav	NCP
132	M/East Ward	Parag Shah	BJP
133	M/East Ward	Parmeshwar Tukaram Kadam	MNS
134	M/East Ward	Saira Khan	SP
135	M/East Ward	Samiksha Deepak Sakre	Shiv Sena
136	M/East Ward	Rukshsana Siddique	SP
137	M/East Ward	Ayesha Rafique Shaikh	SP
138	M/East Ward	Ayesha bano Ain mohammed Khan	SP
139	M/East Ward	AKHTER ABDULRAJJAK QURESHI	SP
140	M/East Ward	Nadiya Mohsin Sheikh	NCP
141	M/East Ward	Vitthal Lokre	Congress
142	M/West Ward	Vaishali Shewale	Shiv Sena
143	M/West Ward	Rutuja Tiwari	Shiv Sena
144	M/West Ward	Anita Panchal	BJP
145	M/West Ward	Shahnawaz Sheikh	AIMIM
146	M/West Ward	Smruddhi Kate	Shiv Sena
147	M/West Ward	Anjali Sanjay Naik	Shiv Sena
148	M/West Ward	Nidhi Shinde	Shiv Sena
149	M/West Ward	Jagdish Makkunny Thaivalapill	BJP
150	L Ward	Sangita Handore	Congress
151	L Ward	Rajesh Phulvariya	BJP
152	L Ward	Asha Subhash Marathe	BJP
153	L Ward	Anil Patankar	Shiv Sena
154	L Ward	Mahadev Shankar Shivgan	BJP
155	L Ward	Shrikant Shettye	Shiv Sena
156	L Ward	Ashwini Matekar	MNS
157	L Ward	Akanksha Shetty	Shiv Sena
158	L Ward	Chitra Sangle	Shiv Sena
159	L Ward	Prakash Devji More	BJP
160	L Ward	Kiran Landge	Independent
161	L Ward	Vijyandra Shinde	Shiv Sena
162	L Ward	Wajid Kureshi	Congress
163	L Ward	Dilip Lande	MNS
164	L Ward	HARISH KRISHNA BHANDIRGE	BJP
165	F/North Ward	Ashraf Azmi	Congress
166	F/North Ward	Sanjay Turde	MNS
167	F/North Ward	Dilshadbanu Mohammedashraf Azmi	Congress
168	F/North Ward	Saida Khan	NCP
169	F/North Ward	Pravin Manish Morajkar	Shiv Sena
170	F/North Ward	Kaptan Malik	NCP
171	F/North Ward	Sanvee Vijay Tandel	Shiv Sena
172	F/North Ward	Rajshree Shirvadkar	BJP
173	F/North Ward	Pralhad Thombre	Shiv Sena
174	F/North Ward	Krishnaveni Vinod Reddy	BJP
175	G/North Ward	MANGESH SHRIDHAR SATAMKAR	Shiv Sena
176	G/North Ward	Ravi Raja	Congress
177	G/North Ward	Nehal Shah	BJP
178	G/North Ward	Amey Arun Ghole	Shiv Sena
179	G/North Ward	Sufiyana Vanu Niyaz Ahmed	Congress
180	G/North Ward	Smita Gavkar	Shiv Sena
181	G/North Ward	PUSHPA KRISHNA KOLI	Congress
182	G/North Ward	Milind Vaidya	Shiv Sena
183	G/North Ward	Ganga Kunal Mane	Congress
184	G/North Ward	Babbu Khan	Congress
185	G/North Ward	Jagdish Makkunny Thaivalapill	Shiv Sena
186	G/South Ward	Vasant Nakashe	Shiv Sena
187	G/South Ward	Mariammal Mathuramlingan Thevar	Shiv Sena
188	G/South Ward	Reshambano Mohammadhasim Khan	NCP
189	G/South Ward	Harshala Ashish More	MNS
190	G/South Ward	Sheetal Gambhir	BJP
191	G/South Ward	Vishakha Raut	Shiv Sena
192	G/South Ward	Priti Prakash Patankar	Shiv Sena
193	G/South Ward	Hemangi Worlikar	Shiv Sena
194	G/South Ward	Samadhan Sarwankar	Shiv Sena
195	F/South Ward	Santosh Kharat	Shiv Sena
196	F/South Ward	Ashish Chemburkar	Shiv Sena
197	F/South Ward	Dattaram Shivaram Narvankar	MNS
198	F/South Ward	Snehal Ambekar	Shiv Sena
199	F/South Ward	Kishori Pednekar	Shiv Sena
200	F/South Ward	Urmila Panchal	Shiv Sena
201	F/South Ward	Supriya More	Congress
202	E Ward	Shraddha Jadhav	Shiv Sena
203	E Ward	Datta Phongade	Shiv Sena
204	E Ward	Anil Kokil	Shiv Sena
205	E Ward	Sindhu Masurkar	Shiv Sena
206	E Ward	Sachin Devdas Padwal	Shiv Sena
207	E Ward	Surekha Rohitdas Lokhande	BJP
208	E Ward	Ramakant Sakharam Rahate	Shiv Sena
209	E Ward	Yashwant Jadhav	Shiv Sena
210	D Ward	Manoj Jamsutkar	Congress
211	D Ward	Rais Shaikh	SP
212	D Ward	Geeta Gavli	Akhil Bhartiya Sena
213	D Ward	Javed Juneja	Congress
214	D Ward	Ajay Patil	BJP
215	D Ward	Arundhati Dudhwadkar	Shiv Sena
216	D Ward	Rajendra Narvankar	Congress
217	C Ward	Meena Patil	BJP
218	C Ward	Anuradha Poddar	BJP
219	C Ward	Jyotsana Mehta	BJP
220	C Ward	Atul Hasmukhlal Shah	BJP
221	B Ward	Akash Raj Purohit	BJP
222	B Ward	Rita Bharat Makwana	BJP
223	B Ward	Nikita Gyanraj Nikam	Congress
224	A Ward	Afreen Javed Shaikh	Congress
225	A Ward	Sujata Digvijay Sanap	Shiv Sena
226	A Ward	Harshita Narvekar	BJP
227	A Ward	Makrand Narvekar	BJP

== Detailed Results ==
Ward	Winner				Runner-up				Margin	
Ward	Candidate	Party	Votes	%	Candidate	Party	Votes	%	Votes	%
1	Tejasvee Abhishek Ghosalkar	SHS	4,913	34.01	Rekha Ramprakash Yadav	IND	3,089	21.38	1,824	12.63
2	Jagdish Karunashankar Oza	BJP	10,719	48.36	Bhalchandra Chintaman Mhatre	SHS	7,924	35.75	2,795	12.61
3	Balkrishna Jaysing Brid	SHS	5,193	21.95	Abhaykumar Rajendraprasad Chaube	INC	4,965	20.98	228	0.97
4	Sujata Udesh Patekar	SHS	11,078	48.15	Kamla Premsingh Purohit	BJP	6,911	30.04	4,167	18.11
5	Sanjay Shankar Ghadi	SHS	11,659	46.22	Motibhai Lallubhai Desai	BJP	9,638	38.21	2,021	8.01
6	Harshad Prakash Karkar	SHS	11,355	47.78	Neela Kanubhai Rathod	BJP	9,647	40.59	1,708	7.19
7	Sheetal Mukesh Mhatre	SHS	8,205	39.17	Yogita Nilesh Patil	BJP	7,625	36.41	580	2.76
8	Harish Ravji Chheda	BJP	8,534	43.86	Deepa Ganesh Patil	SHS	5,644	29.01	2,890	14.85
9	Sweta Sharad Korgaonkar	INC	9,654	36.65	Mohan Ramchandra Mithbavkar	BJP	7,585	28.80	2,069	7.85
10	Jitendra Ambalal Patel	BJP	15,585	54.93	Milind Dwarkanath Mhatre	SHS	9,362	32.99	6,223	21.94
11	Riddhi Bhaskar Khursange	SHS	13,856	54.02	Prakash Yashwant Darekar	BJP	7,454	29.06	6,402	24.96
12	Geeta Sanjay Singhan	SHS	9,005	41.40	Vikram Shirish Chogle	BJP	6,695	30.78	2,310	10.62
13	Vidyarthi Balister Singh	BJP	13,113	51.85	Rajesh Nandkumar Kadam	SHS	5,907	23.35	7,206	28.50
14	Asawari Anil Patil	BJP	8,321	39.94	Bharti Chetan Kadam	SHS	7,180	34.46	1,141	5.48
15	Pravin Rikhavchand Shah	BJP	22,860	73.32	Pareshbhai Babubhai Dhanak	SHS	3,304	10.59	19,556	62.73
16	Anjali Arun Khedkar	BJP	9,465	33.30	Priti Sandesh Dandekar	SHS	7,554	26.58	1,911	6.72
17	Bina Paresh Doshi	BJP	14,414	57.39	Shilpa Saurabh Sangore	SHS	4,822	19.20	9,592	38.19
18	Sandhya Vipul Doshi	SHS	9,815	40.66	Sumesh Gopal Ambare	BJP	8,044	33.33	1,771	7.33
19	Shubhada Subhash Gudekar	SHS	10,817	42.05	Reshma Ravindra Takke	BJP	8,687	33.77	2,130	8.28
20	Deepak Parshuram Tawde	BJP	6,856	37.74	Sudhakar Parshuram Surve	SHS	4,360	24.00	2,496	13.74
