= Municipal Corporation Building, Mumbai =

Historic building in Mumbai

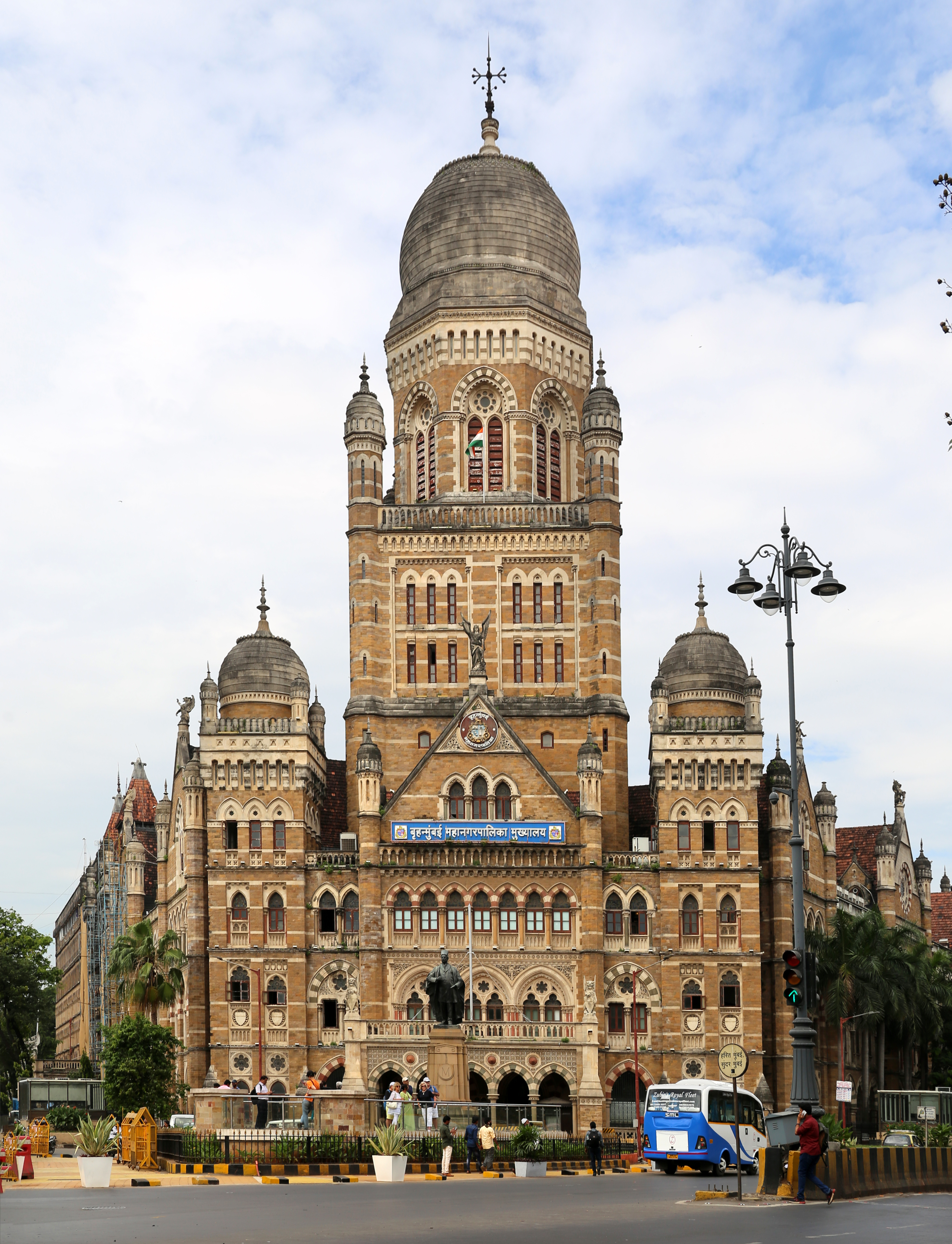
- Mumbai Municipal Corporation Building

- Location within Mumbai

General information
- Architectural style: Venetian Gothic, Indo-Saracenic
- Location: Mumbai, India
- Coordinates: 18.9400°N 72.8353°E
- Construction started: 9 December 1884
- Completed: 1893
- Client: Bombay Presidency

Technical details
- Structural system: Golden–beige basalt rock exterior
- Size: 255 ft tower

Design and construction
- Architect: Frederick William Stevens
- Engineer: Frederick William Stevens

The Municipal Corporation Building, Mumbai, located in South Mumbai, Maharashtra, India is a Grade IIA heritage building opposite to the Chhatrapati Shivaji Terminus (Victoria Terminus; a UNESCO World Heritage Site) at the junction of Dadabhai Naoroji Road and Mahapalika Marg. It is also known as the BrihanMumbai Municipal Corporation Building, or BMC Building for short.

As the name suggests, the V-shaped building houses the civic body that governs the city of Mumbai, the BrihanMumbai Municipal Corporation.

== History ==
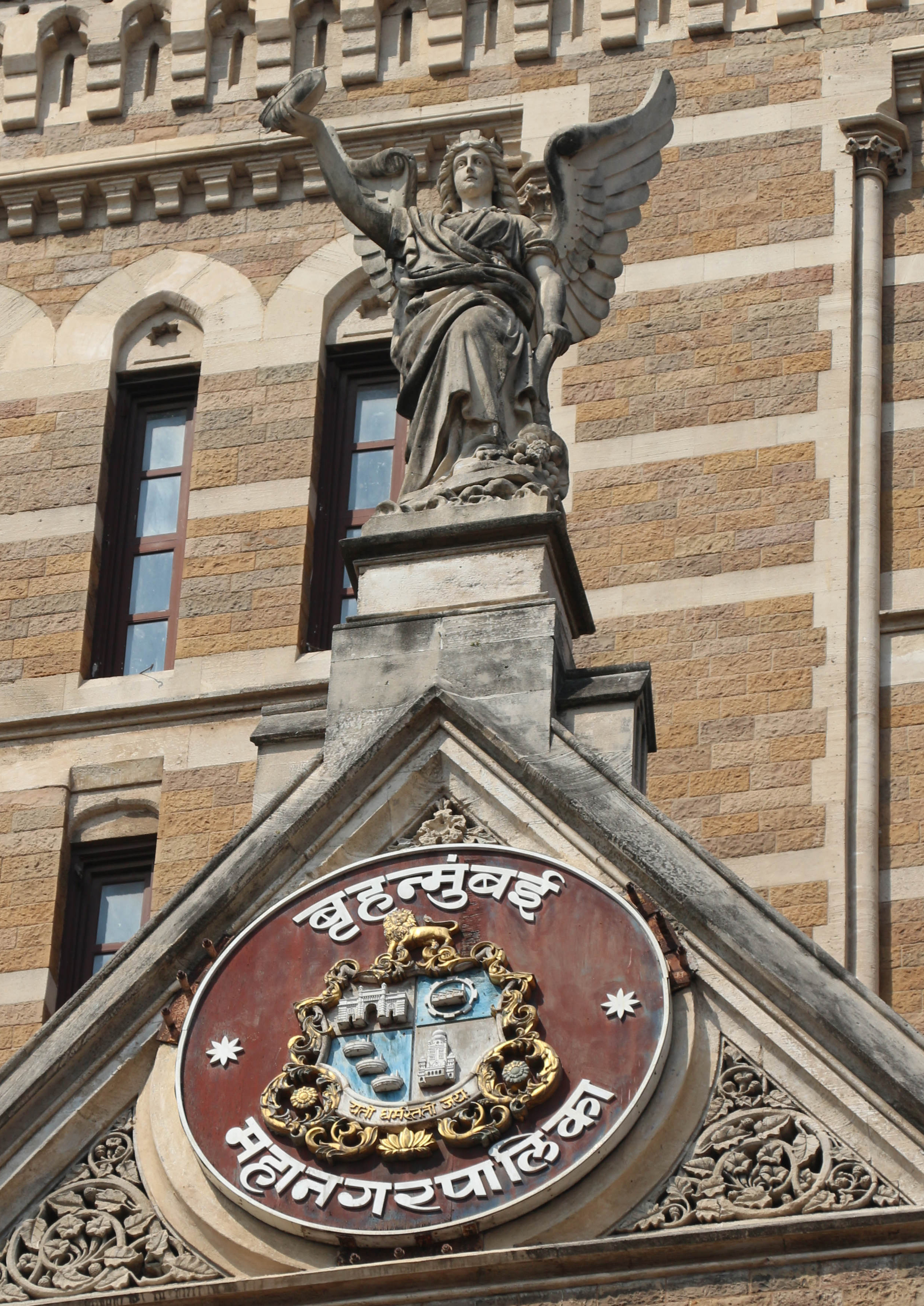
Winged allegorical figure representing the 'urbs prima in Indis' and the coat of arms of BMC below

The BMC was created in 1865 and Arthur Crawford was its first Municipal Commissioner. The Municipality was initially housed in a modest building at the terminus of Girgaum Road. In 1870, it was shifted to a building on the Esplanade, located between Watson Hotel and the Sassoon Mechanics Institute where the present Army & Navy building is situated. On 9 December 1884, the foundation stone for the new building of the Bombay Municipal Corporation was laid opposite to Victoria Terminus, by the Viceroy of the time, Lord Ripon.

Two designs were considered for the building; one of the Gothic designs done by Frederick William Stevens and the other in the Indo-Saracenic design presented by Robert Fellowes Chisholm. In the end, a blend of Venetian Gothic and Indo-Saracenic was settled upon. The building was completed in 1893.

== Heritage status and restoration ==
The Mumbai Heritage Conservation Committee of the Municipal Corporation of Mumbai has categorised the heritage buildings of Mumbai under the guidelines prepared for the purpose. According to these guidelines, the Municipal Corporation Building, Bombay has been categorised by the Mumbai Municipal Corporation as Grade II A. The list of heritage buildings, as categorised on 24 April 2005, under Grade I, Grade II, Grade IIA, Grade III and Precincts are 591. For the Bombay Municipal Corporation Building, the details are elaborated below.

157. Grade-IIA Bombay Municipal Corporation (MCGM Headquarter) - Value Classification - A(his), I(sce), C(seh) A(arch), B(per), B(des), F

Grade-II (A&B) is defined as:

Buildings, of regional or local importance, possessing special architectural or aesthetical merit, cultural or historical value, though of a lower scale than in Heritage Grade. They are local landmarks, contributing to the image and identity of the City.

As per the defined "Scope for Changes (Grade-IIA)", the restorations permitted are:

Internal changes, and adaptive reuse will be generally allowed, but external changes will be subject to scrutiny. Care would be taken to ensure the conservation of all special aspects for which it is included in Heritage Grade-II.

The "Abbreviations of Criteria (Classification)" used for listing of buildings and conservation areas are:

a) Value for architectural, historical or cultural reasons A
- architectural A(arc)
- historical A(his)
- cultural A(cul)
b) The date and / or period and / or design and / or unique use of the buildings or artefact B
- period B(per)
- design B(des)
- use B(uu)
c) Relevance to social or economic history C (seh)
d) Association with well-known persons or events D (bio)
e) A building or groups of buildings and / or areas, of a distinct architectural design and / or style, historic period or way of life having sociological interest and / or community value E
- Style
- Historical
f) The unique value of a building or architectural features or artefact and / or being part of a chain of architectural development that would be broken if it were lost F
g) Its value as a part of a group of buildings G (grp)
h) Representing forms of technological development H (tec)
i) Vistas of natural / scenic beauty or interest, including water–front areas, distinctive and / or planned lines of sight, street line, skyline or topographical I (sce) j) Open spaces sometimes integrally planned with their associated areas having a distinctive way of life and for which are and have the potential to be areas of recreation J

In keeping with the above categorisation, the restoration works of the Municipal Corporation Building, Mumbai was planned by a panel of three conservation architects, namely, Abha Narain Lambah, Shashi Prabhu and Shimul Zaveri Kadri. The restoration plan for the 125-year-old MCGM Gothic structure envisages a) restoration of interiors and the exterior – from the roof tiles to the exquisite Minton tiles inside and to stained glass work and b) strengthening several wooden beams. In the first phase the structure would be restored to its original glory involving replacement of broken tiles, repair of statues, and removal of plants and moss.

The subsequent phases of restoration would involve a) reorganisation of office space within the building to improve the operational efficiency of staff members, b) 'Citizens Facilitation Centre' and party offices in the ground floor and c) Corporation Hall to be modified for a larger seating arrangement by including outer corridors and opening the wooden doors to increase its seating capacity from 200 to 300.

Estimated to cost Rs 80 crore (US$16 million, at current exchange rate), approved by the Mumbai Heritage Conservation Committee and the civic administration, it is the largest and most comprehensive conservation concept undertaken in the city, without disturbing the routine work of the civic affairs and administration of the MCGM.

The Municipal Corporation of Greater Mumbai (MCGM), as the primary agency responsible for urban governance, has also signed an MOU with NGO Council to work closely with NGOs in the fields of education, public health, creation of urban amenities, art and culture and heritage conservation.

== Architecture and design ==
Before construction, two designs were considered for the building; one of the Gothic designs done by Frederick William Stevens and the other in the Indo-Saracenic design presented by Robert Fellowes Chisholm. The Gothic design was finally selected.

The building is known for its 255 ft (77.7 m) tall tower. The chief architectural feature is the central dome that rises to a height of 71.5 m (234.6 ft). The gable has a huge winged allegorical figure representing the 'urbs prima in Indis', the first city of India as it was to be known then. The richly moulded and panelled Council Chamber has a ceiling of unpolished teak. Records also support that at these environs Phansi Talao or Gallows Tank, where public hangings took place, was located. In the period from 1100 to 1500 AD, the architecture of churches constructed with ornamental arches, with ribs supported by buttresses resulted, in the subsequent idea of the framed structural design with grandeur and monumentality during the renaissance period of 1500–1700 AD, as the distinct style; the Mumbai Municipal Corporation building, Chhatrapati Shivaji Maharaj Terminus, the Rajabai tower and the University of Mumbai are some examples of this style. The old style of dome construction was also revived and became popular; 1750 onwards was considered to be the period of modern architecture. The Gothic architecture with controlled composition custom–made to the climatic extremes of the city has cusped window arches and elaborately domed corner towers.

At the entrance to the MCGM stands a bronze statue of Sir Pherozeshah Mehta, a prominent Indian lawyer.

== Gallery ==
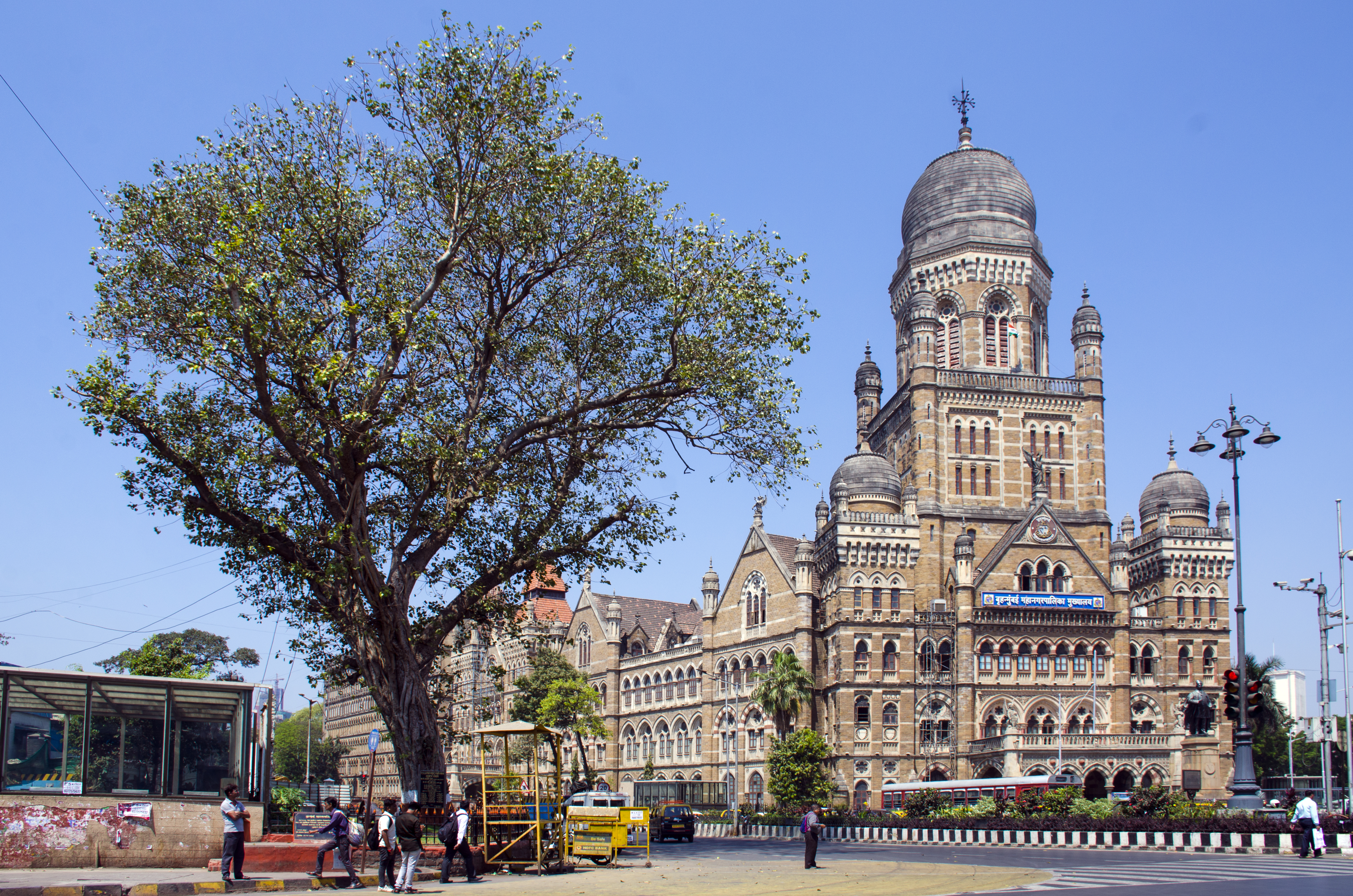

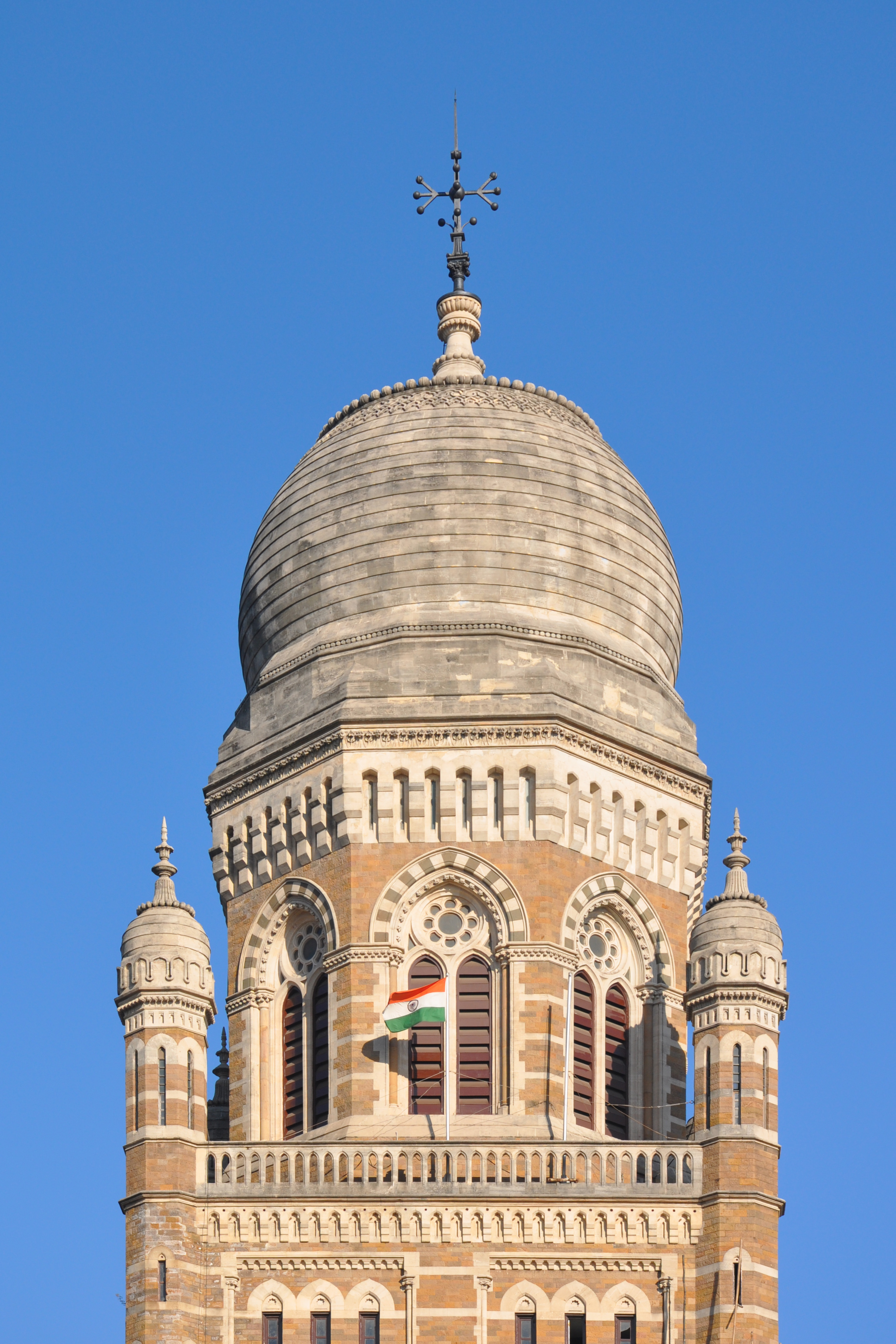
The main tower of the building

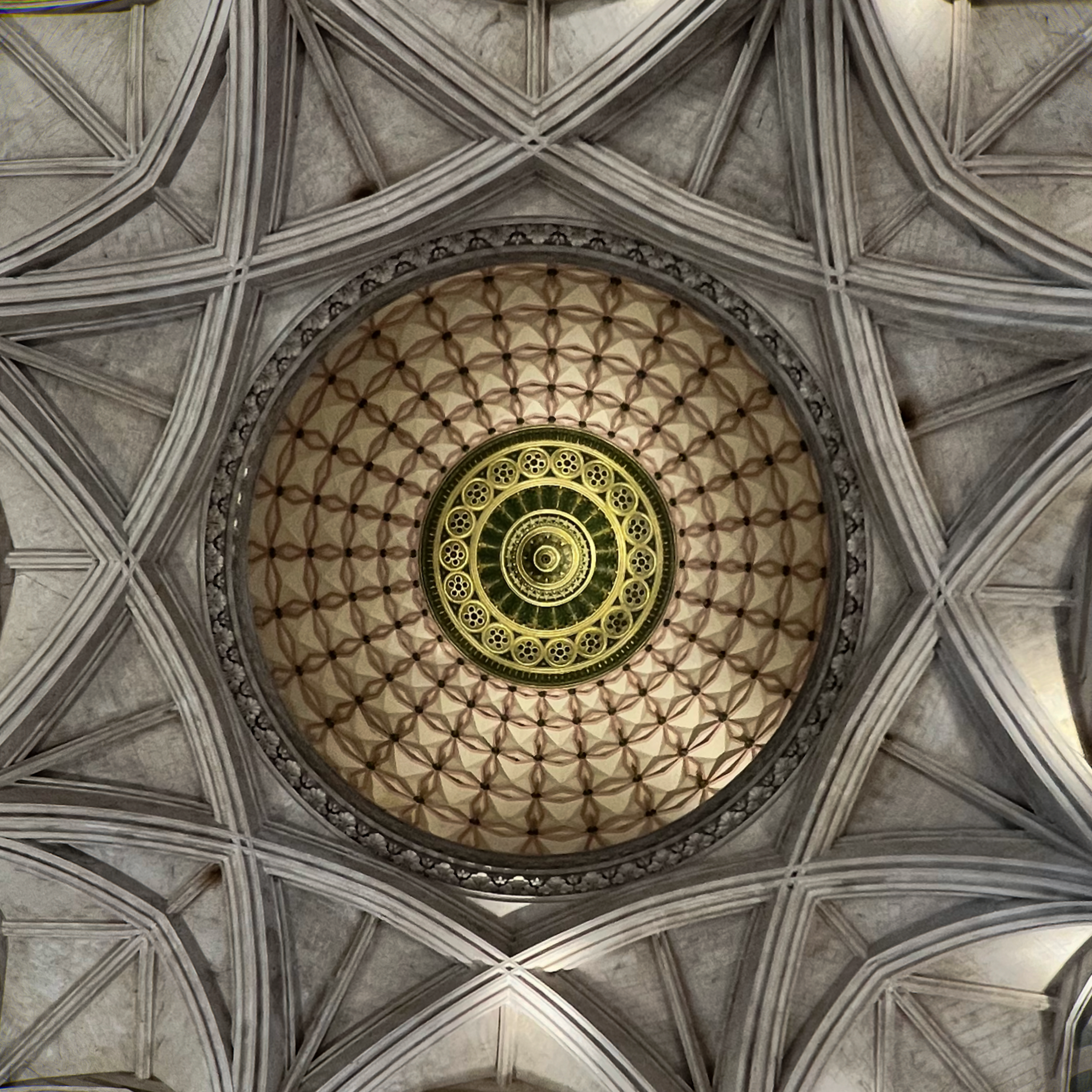
Central Dome of the BMC Building

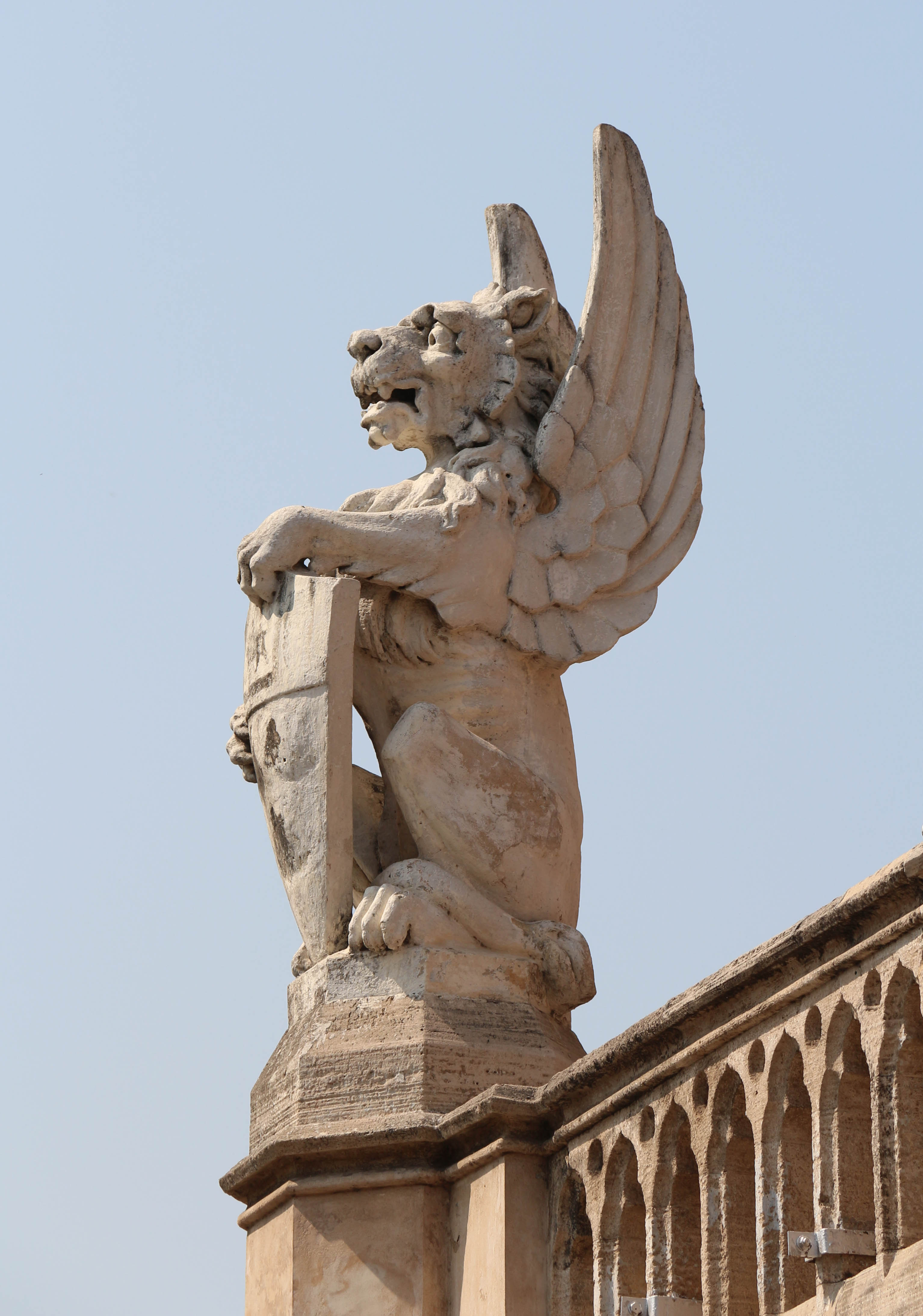
Winged Lion, Griffin like sculpture or Gargoyle

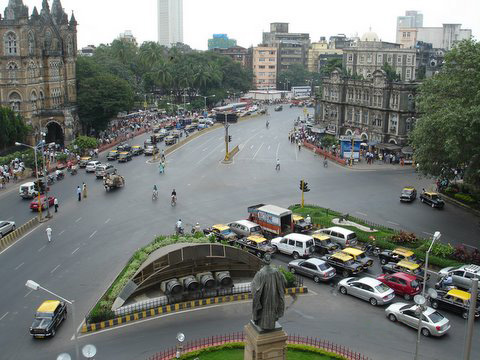
Sir Pherosha Mehta statue watching over the roads, Chhatrapati Shivaji Maharaj Terminus and traffic.

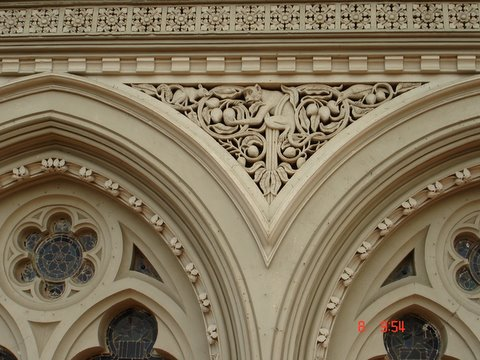
Intricate carving on the arches of the BMC Building depicting a monkey

== See also ==
- Brihanmumbai Municipal Corporation
- Coat of arms of Mumbai
- Administrative divisions of Mumbai
- Mayor of Mumbai
- Municipal Commissioner of Mumbai
- Sheriff of Mumbai
