= Shubha Raul =

Indian politician

Mayor of Mumbai
- In office 2007–2009
- Preceded by: Datta Dalvi
- Succeeded by: Shraddha Jadhav

Personal details
- Party: Shiv Sena
- Occupation: Ayurveda practitioner

Shubha Raul (born 1967) was the Mayor (2007–09) of the Municipal Corporation of Greater Mumbai (MCGM) for a period of 33 months. She is currently the spokesperson of Shiv sena and a member of COVID-19 Ayush Task Force, Government of Maharashtra. She was elected to the post of Mayor on 10 March 2007 and was the third woman mayor of the 124-year-old civic body. She has also served as a Corporator for 3 continuous terms representing the Northern Mumbai suburb of Dahisar, and has served on almost all the committees of the Municipal Corporation of Greater Mumbai (MCGM).

Raul belongs to the Shiv Sena political party and is an M.D. in Ayurveda, gold medalist and a university topper in Maharashtra.

She lives in Borivali, Mumbai. She has two daughters - Tanvi (Engineer by profession) and Mayuri (Doctor by profession). Her husband Umesh is a Deputy General Manager with ONGC.

During her tenure as Mayor for Mumbai, which ended in November 2009, Shubha Raul is said to have been satisfied about two achievements: Eco-Friendly Ganesh festival by setting up artificial ponds and Ban on Hookah Parlours during her tenure.

Her tenure had also been controversial; she wanted Ganesh idol height reduced, adopted a cow and kept it in her bungalow without licence and went on seven foreign tours apart from cracking down on hookah parlours.
