= Rajhans Singh =

Indian politician

Member of Maharashtra Legislative Council
- Incumbent
- Assumed office 2 January 2022
- Preceded by: Bhai Jagtap
- Constituency: Mumbai Local Authorities

Member of Maharashtra Legislative Assembly
- In office 2009–2014
- Preceded by: Constituency created
- Succeeded by: Sunil Prabhu
- Constituency: Dindoshi

Personal details
- Party: Bharatiya Janata Party (2017 onwards)
- Other political affiliations: Indian National Congress (till 2017)
- Parent: Dhananjay Singh (father)

Rajhans Singh is an Indian politician who is currently a member of Maharashtra Legislative Council representing Mumbai Local Authorities' constituency since 2 January 2022. He had earlier been a member of Maharashtra Legislative Assembly from 2009-14 representing Dindoshi on a Congress ticket.
