= Mahadeo =

Mahadeo may refer to:

- Shiva, a Hindu God
- Mahadeo Hills in Madhya Pradesh, India
- Mahadeo Deole, Mayor of Mumbai (2002 - February 2005)
- Mahadeo Govind Ranade, Indian social reformer
- Mahadeorao Sukaji Shivankar, Indian politician
