= Emblem of Maharashtra =

Seat seal of MH State

Emblem of the State Government of Maharashtra
- Armiger: The Government of Maharashtra
- Shield: Samai diva lamp
- Motto: The glory of this seal of the State of Maharashtra will grow like the first day moon. It will be worshipped by the world and will shine only for the well being of its people.
- Other elements: Lotus blossoms

The Emblem of the State Government of Maharashtra is the official seal of the Government of the Indian state of Maharashtra.

== Design ==
The emblem is a circular seal depicting a Samai diya lamp surrounded by 16 lotus blossoms. Between the Samai lamp and lotus blossoms is a motto in Sanskrit: प्रतिपच्चंद्रलेखेव वर्धिष्णुर्विश्व वंदिता महाराष्ट्रस्य राज्यस्य मुद्रा भद्राय राजते, romanized: Pratipaccandralēkhēva vardhiṣṇurviśva vanditā mahārāṣṭrasya rājyasya mudrā bhadrāya rājatē, lit. 'The glory of this seal of the State Government of Maharashtra shall grow like the first day of the moon. It shall be worshipped by the world and shall shine only for the well being of its people.' The motto is based on one found on the "Rajmudra" (royal seal) used by 17th-century Maratha king Chhatrapati Shivaji, the only difference being that the name of the monarch is replaced by the name of the state.

== Historic emblems ==
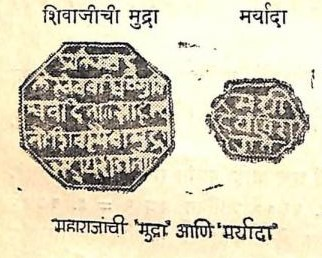
Royal seals ("Rajmudra") used by Chhatrapati Shivaji and the Maratha Empire

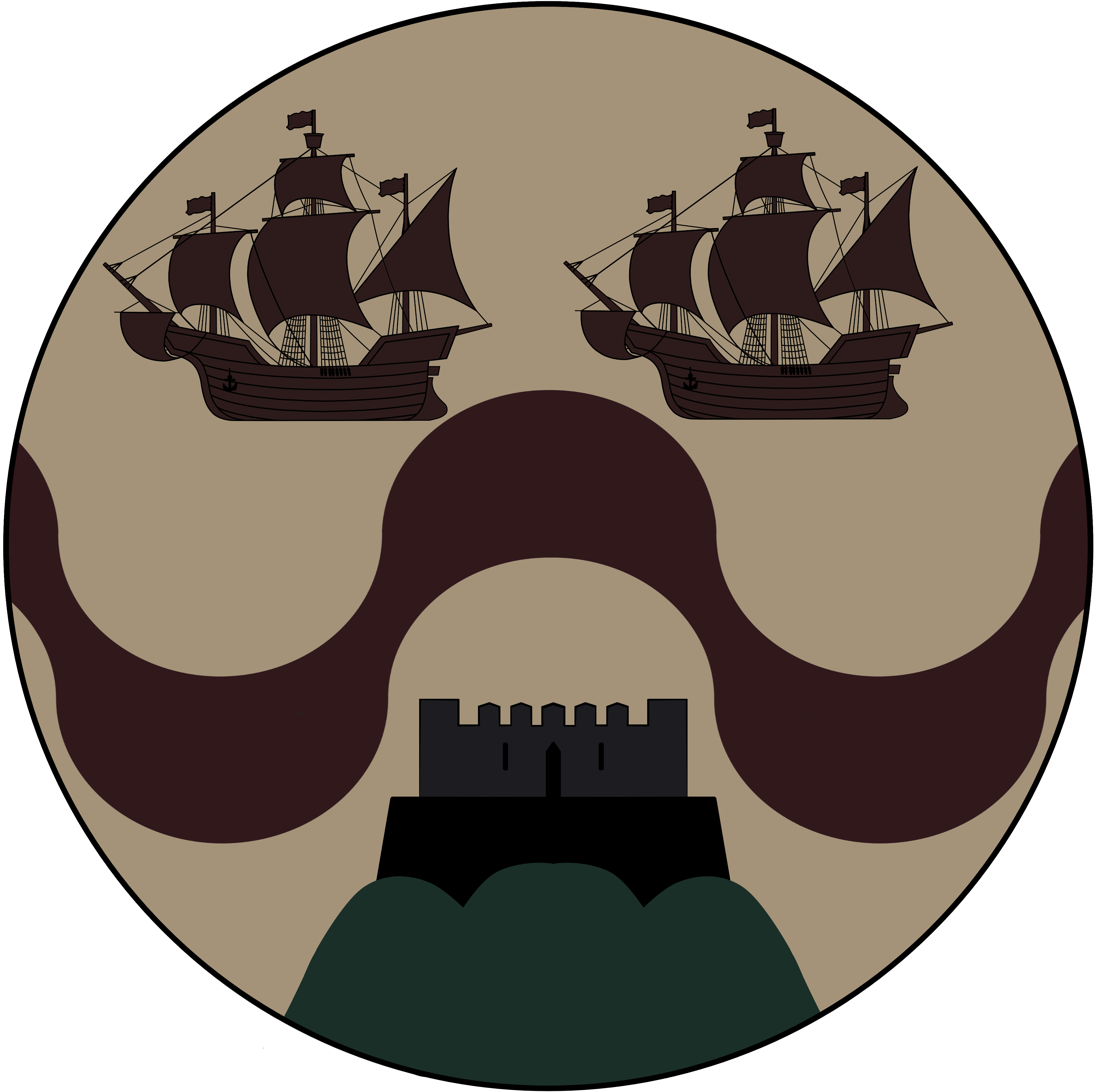
Emblem of the Bombay Presidency during the British Raj

Emblem of the former Bombay State

=== Former princely states in Maharashtra ===
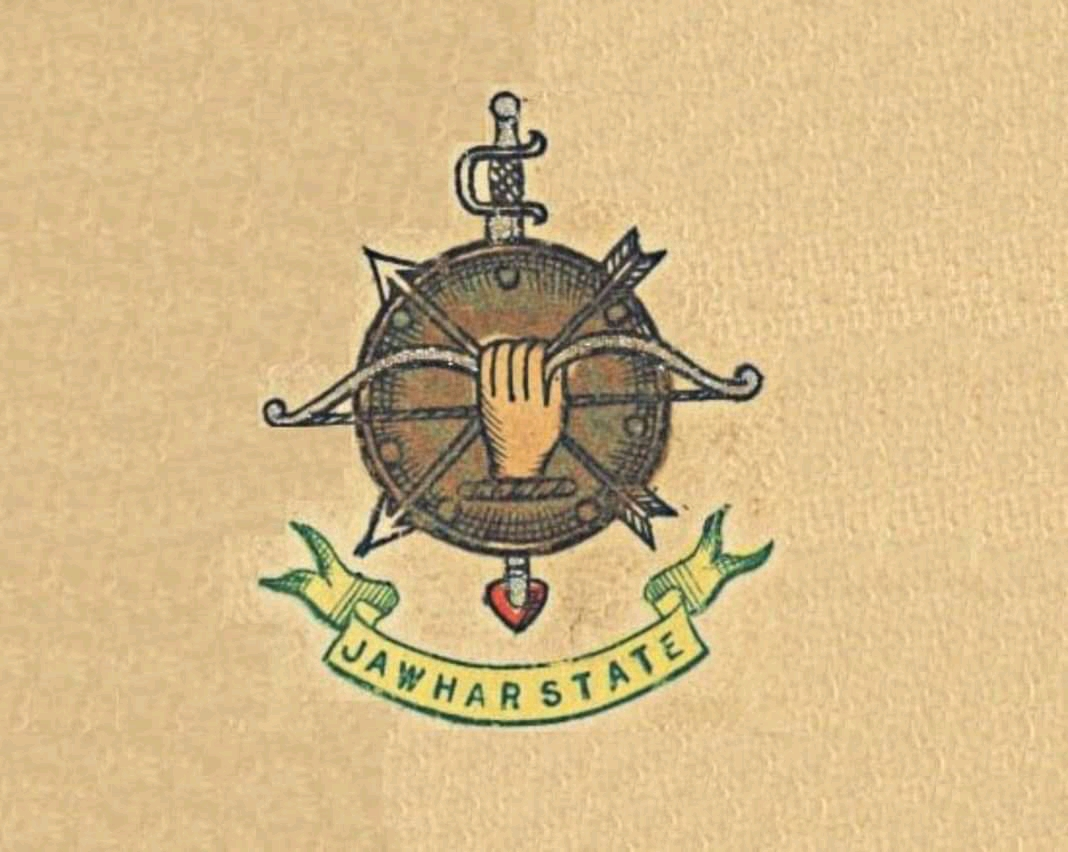
Jawhar State

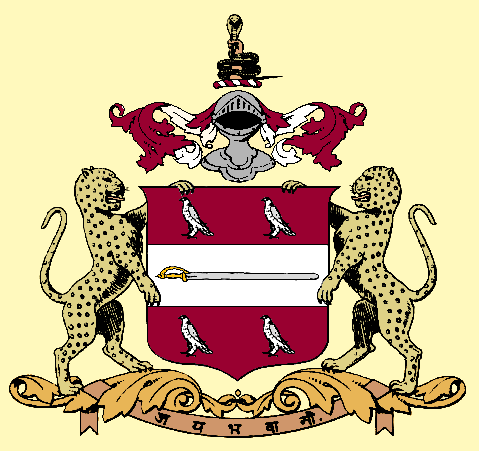
Kolhapur State

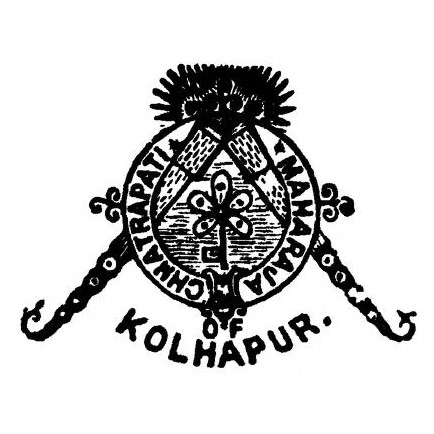
Kolhapur State (1931-1946)

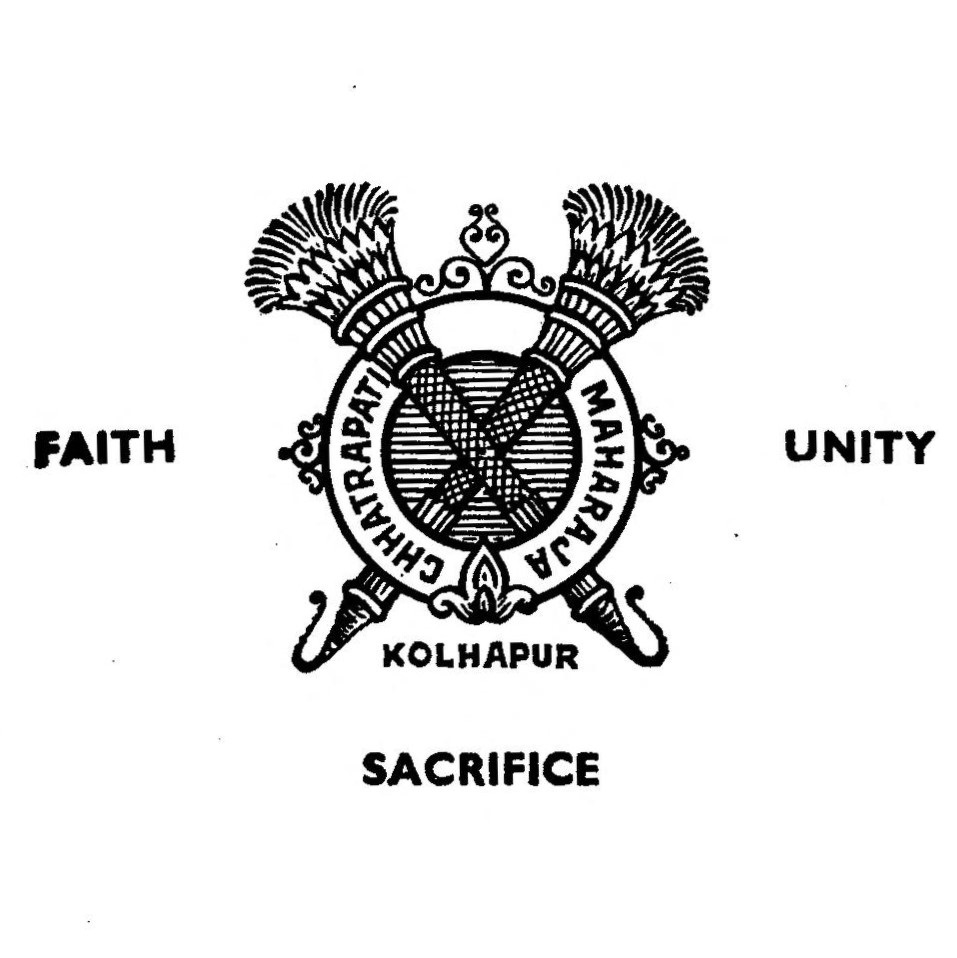
Kolhapur State (1946-1949)

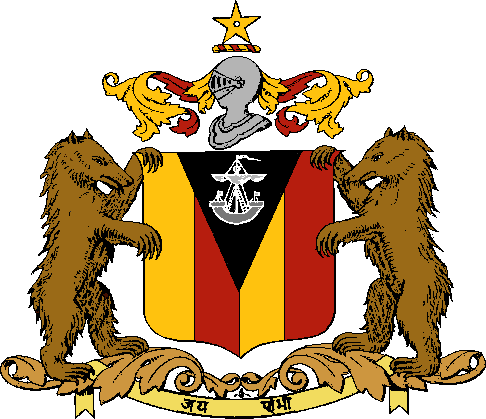
Sawantwadi State

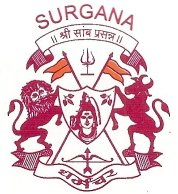
Surgana State

== State government banner ==
The Government of Maharashtra can be represented by a banner displaying the emblem of the state on a white field.

Banner of Maharashtra

== See also ==
- National Emblem of India
- List of Indian state emblems
- Coat of arms of Mumbai
