= Sulochana Modi =

Indian politician

Mayor of Mumbai
- In office 1956
- Preceded by: N. C. Pupala
- Succeeded by: Salebhoy Abdul Kader

Personal details
- Party: Indian National Congress

Sulochana M. Modi was an Indian politician. She was the 25th mayor of Bombay and the first woman mayor. She was awarded the Padma Shri in 1973.
