= Joseph Alban D'Souza =

Indian politician (1878–1964)

Member of the Constituent Assembly of India

Personal details
- Born: 1878 Calangute, Goa, Portuguese India, Portuguese Empire
- Died: 1964 (aged 85–86)
- Citizenship: Indian

Joseph Alban D'Souza (1878 – 1964) was an Indian politician who served as the mayor of Bombay from 1945 to 1946. He was a member of the Constituent Assembly of India representing Bombay to write the Constitution of India, and serve as its first Parliament as an independent nation.

D'Souza also was a three-term member of Standing Committee and its chairman and Chairman of Public Health Commission.
