= Emblem of Mumbai =

Coat of arms of Greater Mumbai
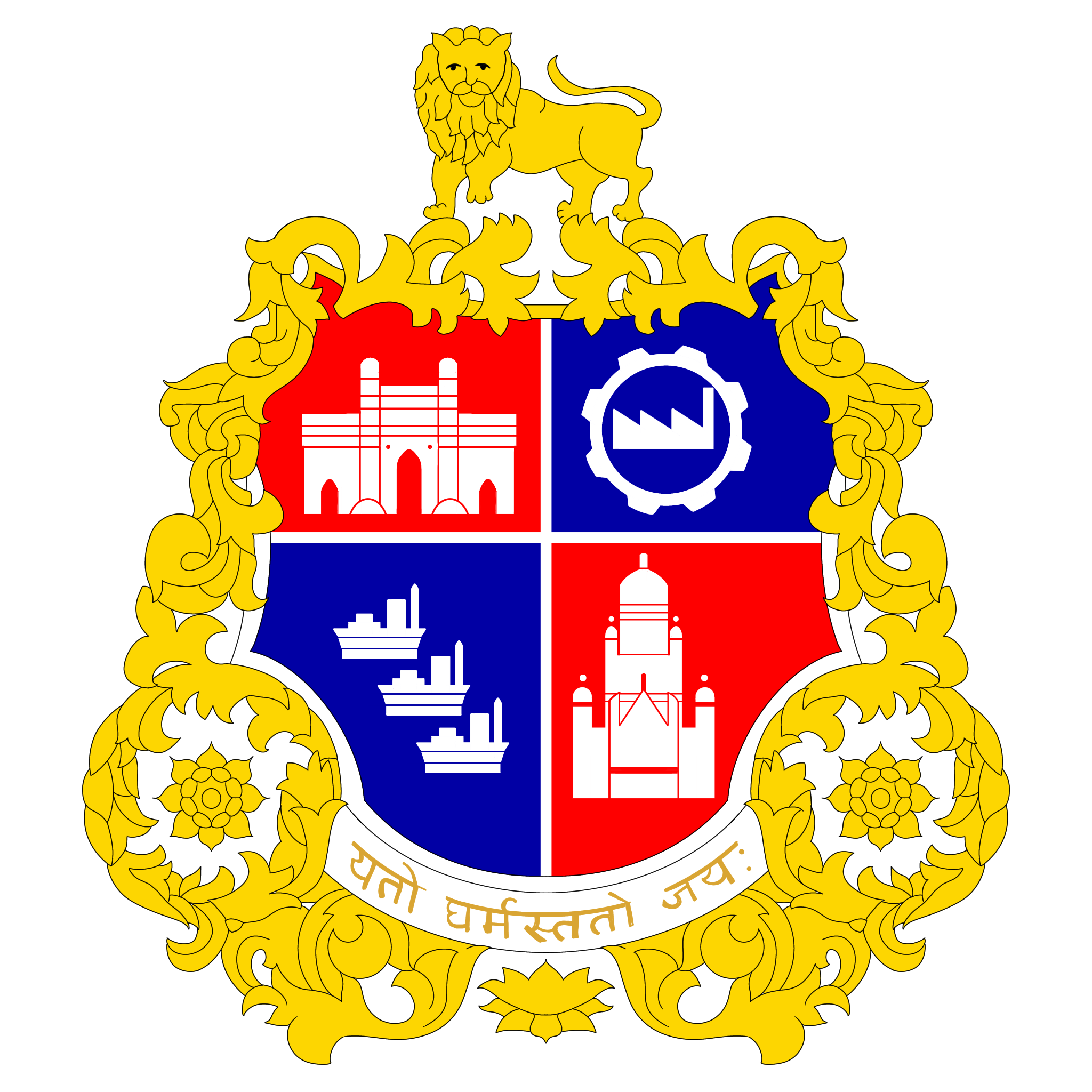
- Armiger: Municipal Corporation of Greater Mumbai
- Adopted: 1888; 138 years ago
- Crest: Lion statant guardant
- Shield: Quarterly Gules and Azure, in the 1st the Gateway of India, the 2nd a factory environed by a cogwheel, the 3rd three sailing ships in bend, the 4th the Municipal Corporation Building, all Argent
- Supporters: Floral patterns flanked by bloming flowers
- Compartment: Blooming Lotus flower
- Motto: यतो धर्मस्ततो जय: (Sanskrit); IAST: Yato Dharmastato Jayaḥ; Where there is Dharma, there shall be Victory

The coat of arms of Greater Mumbai (used by the Brihanmumbai Municipal Corporation, the governing body of the city of Mumbai) is the official coat of arms of the city of Mumbai, Maharashtra. It is a four-panel shield supported by an intertwining floral border in gold.

== Design ==
It is a four-panel shield supported by an intertwining floral border in gold and features a lotus in bloom, an emblem of purity and beauty, at the bottom, and is surmounted lion statant guardant.

Top Left
The Gateway of India, one of Mumbai's most prominent landmarks, signifies the position of Mumbai as a veritable gateway to India.
Top Right
A symbolic factory inscribed in a cog wheel signifies the industrial importance of Mumbai.
Bottom Left
The three sailing ships in outline denote Mumbai's pre-eminence as a port and commercial centre.
Bottom Right
A symbolized diagram of the Corporation building depicting the seat of Local Self Government in Mumbai.

The motto यतो धर्मस्ततो जय:, Yato Dharmas Tato Jayaḥ, (Where there is Righteousness, there shall be Victory) in Sanskrit is inscribed in gold at the bottom.

== History ==
The coat of arms for what the city that was at the time known as Bombay was introduced in 1888. It depicted a lion puissant holding a shield. The current design draws inspiration from this former design.

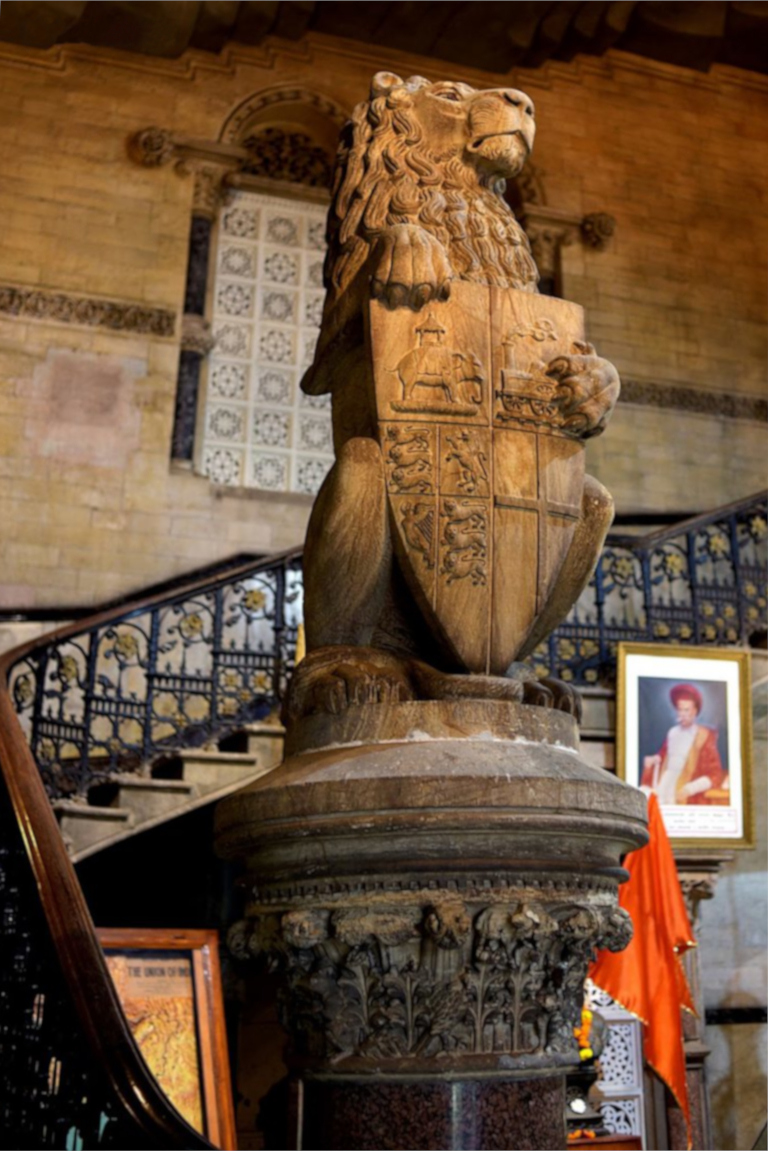
A lion puissant holding the Imperial coat of arms of Bombay. In the backdrop is a portrait of Jagannath Shankarseth, one of the founding fathers of the city of Mumbai.

== See also ==
- Municipal Corporation of Greater Mumbai
- Municipal Corporation Building, Mumbai (for details on the buildings architecture)
- Administrative divisions of Mumbai
- Mayor of Mumbai
- Municipal Commissioner of Mumbai
- Sheriff of Mumbai
- Emblem of Maharashtra
