= Administrative divisions of Mumbai =

The city of Mumbai, Maharashtra, India, is divided into administrative divisions. Greater Mumbai is the urban agglomeration of 18 million people (the largest in India and one of the six largest in the world) which comes under the Municipal Corporation of Greater Mumbai. The Municipal Corporation of Greater Mumbai employs 140,626 people. The Corporation operates an annual budgetary outlay in excess of Rs. 30,000 Crores.

The two major offices in the City Government are those of Mayor of Mumbai and the Municipal Commissioner of Mumbai. The office of the Mayor combines a functional role of chairing the Corporation meeting as well as ceremonial role associated with being the First Citizen of the premier city of India. Per the amended Municipal Corporation Act of 1888, a Deputy Mayor is appointed by the Mayor. The tenure of the Mayor and Deputy Mayor is two and a half years. The Commissioner, a key figure in the local self-government, is the executive head. He is the final administrative authority for the local self-government of Mumbai.

For administrative purposes, Greater Mumbai is divided into 7 zones, each consisting of 3 to 5 wards named alphabetically. All the information below is public domain information obtained from government sources and is accurate as of 1993, except the population statistics which are accurate as of 2001.

Ward	Population
A	210,926
B	140,480
C	190,670
D	378,610
E	439,390
F	430,406
G	537,032
H	478,413
I	516,552

== Zone 1 ==
Zone 1 consists of Wards A, B, C, D and E

=== Ward A ===
Areas under this ward are Fort, parts of Ballard Estate, Shahid Bhagat Singh Road, P D'Mello Road, Marine Drive (Queen's Necklace), AP Marg, Carnac Road (Lokmanya Tilak Marg) and Colaba.

- Population: 210,926 (as per 2001 census)
- Eating houses: 414
- Municipal hospitals: 1
- Other hospitals: 17
- Cemeteries: 19
- Schools: 52

=== Ward B ===
Areas under this ward are parts of P D'Mello road, IR Road, Abdul Rehman Street, RB Marg, MA Road, JMR Marg and Carnac Road (Lokmanya Tilak Marg).

- Area: 2.47 km^{2}.
- Population: 140,480 (as per 2001 census)
- Eating houses: 385
- Municipal hospitals: 0

Other hospitals: 4

- Cemeteries: 2
- Schools: 23

=== Ward C ===
Areas under this ward are Chandanwadi, parts of IR Road, Abdul Rehman Street, Netaji Subhash Road, Maulana Shaukatali Road, Trimbak Parshuram St., Ardeshir Dady Jaykar St, Vitthalbhai Patel Road, Babasaheb J. Marg, Lokmanya Tilak Marg, Vasudeo Balvant Phadke Chowk, Anandilal Poddar Marg and Marine Drive.

- Area: 1.78 km^{2}.
- Population: 190,670 (as per 2001 census)
- Eating houses: 296
- Municipal hospitals: 0
- Other hospitals: 2
- Cemeteries: 5
- Schools: 44

=== Ward D ===
Areas under this ward are Grant Road, Dr.D.B.Marg, V. P. Road, Ardeshir Dadi Street, Trimbak Parshuram Street, Sukhiaji Street, Netaji Subhash Road, D. N. Purandare Marg, Walkeshwar Road, B. lndrajit Road, Breach Candy up to Haji Ali, Boman Behram Marg, Aurthur Road, Tardeo Road, Cumballa and Malabar Hills, Keshavrao Khade Marg, B. Jaikar Marg up to Bhuleshwar Naka, Crossing M. K. Road up to Seashore.

- Area: 6.63 km^{2}.
- Population: 378,610 (as per 2001 census)
- Eating houses: 2,108
- Municipal hospitals: 0
- Other hospitals: 0
- Cemeteries: 3
- Schools: 42

=== Ward E ===
Areas under this ward are Byculla, parts of Reay Road, West Sane Guruji Marg, Jahangir Boman Behram Marg, Sukhalaji Street, Dattaram Lad Marg, South Ramchandra Bhatt Marg, Wadi Bunder and Maulana Shaukataii Road.

- Area: 7.4 km^{2}.
- Population: 439,390 (as per 2001 census)
- Eating houses: 311
- Municipal hospitals: 3
- Other hospitals: 13
- Cemeteries: 9
- Schools: 73

== Zone 2 ==
Zone 2 consists of Wards F and G, comprising a population of approximately 2 million as of 1991.

=== Ward F North ===
Areas under this ward are Matunga along with sion. parts of Thane Creek and Mankikar Marg.

- Area: 12.98 km^{2}.
- Population: 5,29,034 (as per 2011 census)
- Eating houses: 169
- Municipal hospitals: 1
- Other hospitals: 3
- Cemeteries: 9
- Schools: 69

=== Ward F South ===
Parel comes under this area.

- Area: 14 km^{2}.
- Population: 417,551 (per 1991 census)
- Eating houses: 333
- Municipal hospitals: 2
- Other hospitals: 3
- Cemeteries: 5
- Schools: 103

=== Ward G North ===
Dadar comes under this area.

- Area: 9.07 km^{2}.
- Population: 537,032 (per 1991 census)
- Eating houses: 398
- Municipal hospitals: 1
- Other hospitals: 5
- Cemeteries: 8
- Schools: 64

=== Ward G South ===
N. M. Joshi Marg and Worli comes under this area.

- Area: 10 km^{2}.
- Population: 516,552 (per 1991 census)
- Eating houses: 247
- Municipal hospitals: 0
- Other hospitals: 5
- Cemeteries: 5
- Schools: 104

== Zone 3 ==
This zone consists of wards H and K.

=== Ward H East ===
Areas under this ward are Eastern parts of Bandra, Khar, Santacruz, parts of CST Road, Vile Parle, Mahim and Dharavi.

- Area: 18.53 km^{2}.
- Population: 478,413 (per 1991 census)
- Eating houses: 159
- Municipal hospitals: 1
- Other hospitals: 1
- Cemeteries: 6
- Schools: 63 + 2 for intellectually challenged children

=== Ward H West ===
Areas under this ward are Bandra, parts of Khar and Santacruz.

- Area: 11.55 km^{2}.
- Population: 322,141 (per 1991 census)
- Eating houses: 217
- Municipal hospitals: 1
- Other hospitals: 4
- Cemeteries: 8
- Schools: 44

=== Ward K East ===
Andheri (East) Vile Parle (East) Jogeshwari (East)

=== Ward K West ===
Areas under this ward are Andheri (West) and Oshiwara.

- Area: 23.39 km^{2}.
- Population: 691,000 (per 2001 census)
- Eating houses: 283
- Municipal hospitals: 1
- Cemeteries: 17
- Schools: 542

== Zone 4 ==
This zone consists of wards P and R.

=== Ward P North ===
Malad comes under this ward.

- Area: 19.13 km^{2}.
- Population: 559,283 (per 1991 census)
- Eating houses: 216
- Municipal hospitals: 2
- Cemeteries: 24
- Schools: 13

=== Ward P South ===
Areas under this ward are Goregaon, parts of Malad and Oshiwara.

- Area: 24.44 km^{2}.
- Population: 364,469 (per 1991 census)
- Eating houses: 187
- Municipal hospitals: 1
- Other hospitals: 44
- Cemeteries: 2
- Schools: 51

=== Ward R Central ===
Areas under this ward are bhandup Sanjay Gandhi National Park (National Park), Gorai, Kulvem Village (Devidas Lane) N.D. Zone to Link Road from Devidas lane to N.C. Phadke fly over bridge and Daulat Nagar, Cemetery River to Nancy Colony 44'-0 wide Road, Chogale Nagar, Borivali (E). Khatao Estate, Bhor Industries 90'-0 wide D.P. Road, Railway subway Poisar Depot, 90'-0 Borsapada Road. Mahavir Nagar RDP-4, Charkop up to Creek.

- Area : 50sq.km.
- Population: 6,81,377

=== Ward R North ===
Dahisar comes under this ward.

=== Ward R South ===
Kandivali comes under this ward Thakur complex, Thakur Village, Lokhandwala Township, MG Road Kandivali (West), Patel Nagar, Mathuradas Road etc.

== Zone 5 ==
This zone consists of wards L and M comprising a total population of approximately 1.4 million.

=== Ward L ===
Areas under this ward are Kurla, Chandivali, Saki Naka, Tunga village, parts of Powai.

- Area: 13.46 km^{2}.
- Population: 8,92,278 (per 2011 census)
- Eating houses: 256
- Municipal hospitals: 1
- Other hospitals: 0
- Cemeteries: 2
- Schools: 85

Full Address - BMC SG Barve Marg, Ambedkar Nagar, kurla West, Mumbai Maharashtra 400070

=== Ward M East ===
Govandi and few area of Chembur comes under this ward. (Pin code - 400088, 400043 & Half area of 400074)

- Area: 32.5 km^{2}.
- Population: 8,06,433 (per 2011 census)
- Eating houses: 2270
- Municipal hospitals: 1
- Other hospitals: 55
- Cemeteries: 4
- Schools: 202

=== Ward M West ===
G.M. Link Road to Suman Nagar Junction and from Mahul to Somayya Nallah (Pin code - 400089, 400071 & half area of 400074)

- Area: 19.37 km^{2}.
- Population: 4,13,727 (per 2011 census)
- Municipal hospitals: 1
- Other hospitals: 60
- Cemeteries: 3
- Police Stations: 4

== Zone 6 ==
This zone consists of wards N, S and T.

=== Ward N ===
Ghatkopar comes under this ward.

- Area: 39 km^{2}.
- Population: 510,708 (per 1991 census)
- Eating houses: 209
- Municipal hospitals: 3
- Other hospitals: 80
- Cemeteries: 6
- Schools: 102

=== Ward S ===
Bhandup comes under this ward.

- Area: 250 km^{2}.
- Population: 743,783 (per 1991 census)
- Eating houses: 159

=== Ward T ===
Mulund comes under this ward.

- Area: 45.41 km^{2}.
- Population: 288,158 (per 1991 census)
- Eating houses: 179
- Municipal hospitals: 2
- Other hospitals: 20
- Cemeteries: 3
- Schools: 49

== See also ==
- List of neighbourhoods in Mumbai
- Municipal Corporation of Greater Mumbai(MCGM) or Brihanmumbai Municipal Corporation (BMC)
- Coat of arms of Mumbai
- Mayor of Mumbai
- Municipal Commissioner of Mumbai
- Sheriff of Mumbai
