= 2002 Brihanmumbai Municipal Corporation election =

Local elections in Maharashtra

← 1997	2002	2007 →

All 227 seats in the Brihanmumbai Municipal Corporation 114 seats needed for a majority
- Turnout: 42%

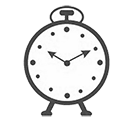
	Majority party	Minority party	Third party
Party	SS	INC	BJP
Seats won	97	61	35
Seat change	▼6	▲13	▲9
	Fourth party
Party	NCP
Seats won	12
BMC majority before election
SHS - BJP
Elected BMC majority
SHS - BJP

The 2002 Brihanmumbai Municipal Corporation election was held in February 2002.

== Election result ==
Shiv Sena - BJP alliance won the 2002 BMC election with a clear majority. Indian National Congress and Nationalist Congress Party are other two major political parties in this election
