= Dindoshi Assembly constituency =

Constituency of the Maharashtra legislative assembly in India

Coordinates: 19.177°N 72.863°E

Dindoshi
- Constituency No. 159 for the Maharashtra Legislative Assembly

Constituency details
- Country: India
- Region: Western India
- State: Maharashtra
- District: Mumbai Suburban
- Lok Sabha constituency: Mumbai North West
- Established: 2008
- Total electors: 306,552
- Reservation: None

Member of Legislative Assembly
- 15th Maharashtra Legislative Assembly
- Incumbent Sunil Prabhu
- Party: SS(UBT)
- Alliance: MVA
- Elected year: 2024

Dindoshi Assembly constituency is one of the 288 Vidhan Sabha (legislative assembly) constituencies in Maharashtra state in western India.

== Overview ==
Dindoshi constituency is one of the 26 Vidhan Sabha constituencies located in the Mumbai Suburban district.

Dindoshi is part of the Mumbai North West Lok Sabha constituency which include five other Vidhan Sabha segments, namely Goregaon, Versova, Jogeshwari East, Andheri East and Andheri West in the Mumbai Suburban district.

== Members of the Legislative Assembly ==
Year	Member	Party
Till 2009 : Constituency did not exist
2009	Rajhans Singh	Indian National Congress
2014	Sunil Prabhu	Shiv Sena
2019	Sunil Prabhu	Shiv Sena
2024	Sunil Prabhu	Shiv Sena (UBT)

== Election results ==
=== Assembly Election 2024 ===
2024 Maharashtra Legislative Assembly election : Dindoshi
Party	Candidate	Votes	%	±%
SS(UBT)	Sunil Prabhu	76,437	43.41	New
SS	Sanjay Nirupam	70,255	39.90	▼13.84
MNS	Adv. Bhaskar Budhaji Parab	20,309	11.53	▼5.37
Independent	Rupesh Radheshyam Kadam	3,540	2.01	New
NOTA	None of the Above	1,530	0.87	▼1.27
VBA	Rajendra Tanaji Sasane	1,199	0.68	▼1.49
Margin of victory		6,182	3.51	▼25.59
Turnout		177,627	57.94	▲3.14
Total valid votes		176,097		
Registered electors		306,552		▲8.83
SS(UBT) gain from SS		Swing	▼10.33	

=== Assembly Election 2019 ===
2019 Maharashtra Legislative Assembly election : Dindoshi
Party	Candidate	Votes	%	±%
SS	Sunil Prabhu	82,203	53.74	▲18.02
NCP	Vidya Chavan	37,692	24.64	▲19.24
MNS	Arun Dhondiram Surve	25,854	16.90	▲7.64
VBA	Siddharth Atmaram Kakde	3,326	2.17	New
NOTA	None of the Above	3,266	2.14	▲1.42
BVA	Amit Suryakant Swami	1,042	0.68	New
AAP	Dilip Narayan Tawde	961	0.63	New
Margin of victory		44,511	29.10	▲16.58
Turnout		156,300	55.49	▲1.07
Total valid votes		152,970		
Registered electors		281,684		▼5.31
SS hold		Swing	▲18.02	

=== Assembly Election 2014 ===
2014 Maharashtra Legislative Assembly election : Dindoshi
Party	Candidate	Votes	%	±%
SS	Sunil Prabhu	56,577	35.72	▲5.99
INC	Rajhans Singh Dhananjay Singh	36,749	23.20	▼10.84
BJP	Mohit Kamboj	36,169	22.84	New
MNS	Thackeray Shalini Jeetendra	14,662	9.26	▼19.86
NCP	Raorane Ajit Balkrishna	8,550	5.40	New
AIMIM	Hussain Ismail Taj	1,637	1.03	New
BSP	Maurya Raghavprasad Shivjiprasad	1,421	0.90	▼0.34
NOTA	None of the Above	1,139	0.72	New
Margin of victory		19,828	12.52	▲8.20
Turnout		159,556	53.63	▲1.59
Total valid votes		158,379		
Registered electors		297,492		▲13.02
SS gain from INC		Swing	▲1.68	

=== Assembly Election 2009 ===
2009 Maharashtra Legislative Assembly election : Dindoshi
Party	Candidate	Votes	%	±%
INC	Rajhans Singh Dhananjay Singh	46,278	34.04	New
SS	Sunil Prabhu	40,413	29.73	New
MNS	Thakare Shalini Jitendra	39,587	29.12	New
SP	Mishra Shreekant	4,309	3.17	New
BSP	Ganesh Laxman Randive	1,683	1.24	New
JSS	Parle Bhikaji Dhondiram	1,430	1.05	New
Independent	Mohammad Hanif Ismail Sidatar (Ghachi)	908	0.67	New
Margin of victory		5,865	4.31	
Turnout		135,941	51.64	
Total valid votes		135,938		
Registered electors		263,225		
INC win (new seat)				

== See also ==
- List of constituencies of Maharashtra Vidhan Sabha
