= 2007 Brihanmumbai Municipal Corporation election =

Local elections in Maharashtra

- February 2007

All 227 seats in the Brihanmumbai Municipal Corporation 114 seats needed for a majority
- Turnout: 46% (▲4%)

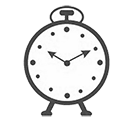

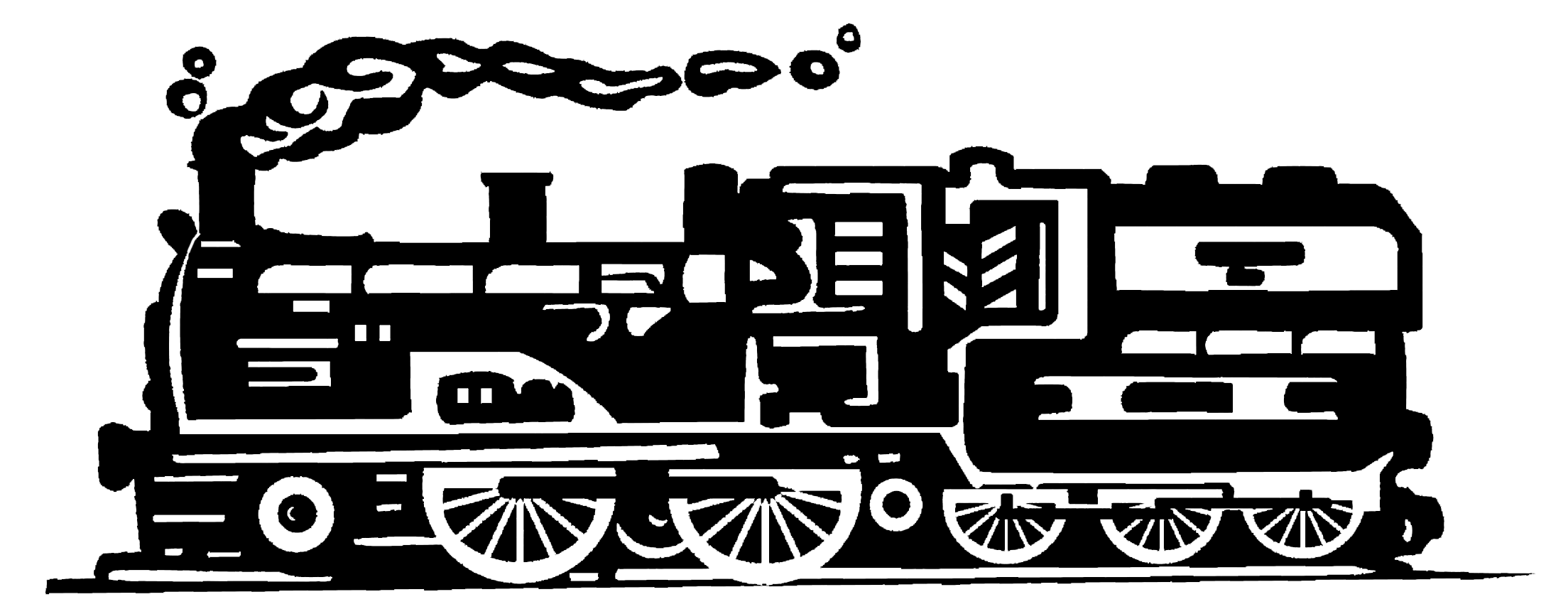

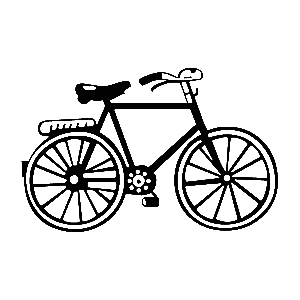
	First party	Second party	Third party
Party	SS	INC	BJP
Seats won	84	75	28
Seat change	▼13	▲15	▼7
	Fourth party	Fifth party	Sixth party
Party	NCP	MNS	SP
Seats won	14	7	7
Seat change	▲2
BMC majority before election
SHS - BJP
Elected BMC majority
SHS - BJP

The 2007 Brihanmumbai Municipal Corporation election was held on 16 February 2007.

== Election result ==
Shiv Sena - BJP alliance won the BMC election thrice in a row 1997, 2002 and 2007. Shiv Sena, Bhartiya Janta Party and Indian National Congress are the major political parties in this election.
