= Mahadeo Deole =

Indian politician

Mahadeo Devale was the Mayor of Mumbai (2002 – February 2005). He was handpicked by Shiv Sena supremo Bal Thackeray for the post.
