= Shraddha Jadhav =

Indian politician

- श्रद्धा जाधव

Mayor of Mumbai
- In office 1 December 2009 – 8 March 2012
- Preceded by: Shubha Raul
- Succeeded by: Sunil Prabhu
- Constituency: Ward 202, Mumbai

Personal details
- Party: Shiv Sena
- Spouse: Sridhar
- Children: Pawan and Govind Sagar

Shraddha Jadhav (born c.1964) is a Shiv Sena politician from Mumbai, Maharashtra.

She served as the mayor of the city of Mumbai, the capital of the Indian state of Maharashtra from 1 December 2009 to 8 March 2012, and as chief of Brihanmumbai Municipal Corporation (BMC), the country's richest municipal body. She was elected to Brihanmumbai Municipal Corporation for six consecutive terms from 1992 to 2017.

== Personal life ==
Jadhav originally hails from Sangameshwar in the Konkan region of Maharashtra. She is a commerce graduate.

She is married to Sridhar Jadhav and has two sons, Pawan and Govind Sagar. She is a resident of Parel.

Her father-in-law, Mukund Jadhav, a former independent corporator, was also her political mentor. Her family runs Manohar decorators and a travel agency, which is run by her husband. She is one of the richest corporators of the BMC elected in 2007.

In political circles, Jadhav is known for "elegant dressing" and "fashion sense", especially her "crisp" cotton saris.

== Political career ==
In 1992, Jadhav was first elected as corporator from Parel ward 36 as an independent candidate. She subsequently won the next two BMC elections from the same ward. In 1997, Jadhav joined the Shiv Sena and in 1998, she was selected in the 11-member council of then Mumbai Mayor Nandu Satam. In 2006, she contested against Kalidas Kolambkar, a close aide of Narayan Rane, in a Maharashtra assembly by-election. In 2007, she was elected as a municipal corporator from ward 169, which includes Parel and Antop Hill. Jadhav was elected Mumbai mayor on 1 December 2009, defeating Priscilla Kadam of the Congress Party by 114 for and 96 against votes in the 228-member BMC. She was the joint nominee of the Shiv Sena-Bharatiya Janata Party (BJP) alliance. She became the fifth female Mayor of Mumbai, taking office after another female mayor, Shubha Raul, also from the Shiv Sena.

Jadhav has headed the gardens and market committees and also the women and child welfare committees of the BMC. She has been part of the standing and improvement committee. She was one of the 25 finalists for the 2010 World Mayor prize.

== Positions held ==
- 1992: Elected as corporator in Brihanmumbai Municipal Corporation (1st term)
- 1997: Re-elected as corporator in Brihanmumbai Municipal Corporation (2nd term)
- 2002: Re-elected as corporator in Brihanmumbai Municipal Corporation (3rd term)
- 2007: Re-elected as corporator in Brihanmumbai Municipal Corporation (4th term)
- 2009-2012: Mayor of Brihanmumbai Municipal Corporation
- 2012: Re-elected as corporator in Brihanmumbai Municipal Corporation (5th term)
- 2017: Re-elected as corporator in Brihanmumbai Municipal Corporation (6th term)

== See also ==
- Mayor of Mumbai
