= Madhav Dalvi =

Indian cricketer (1925–2012)

Personal information
- Full name: Madhav Mangesh Dalvi
- Born: 19 August 1925; Bombay, India
- Died: 1 October 2012 (aged 87); Mumbai, India
- Source: ESPNcricinfo, 23 June 2016

Madhav Dalvi (19 August 1925 – 1 October 2012) was an Indian cricketer. He played first-class cricket for Mumbai and Vidarbha between 1947 and 1962.
