= Snehal Ambekar =

Indian politician

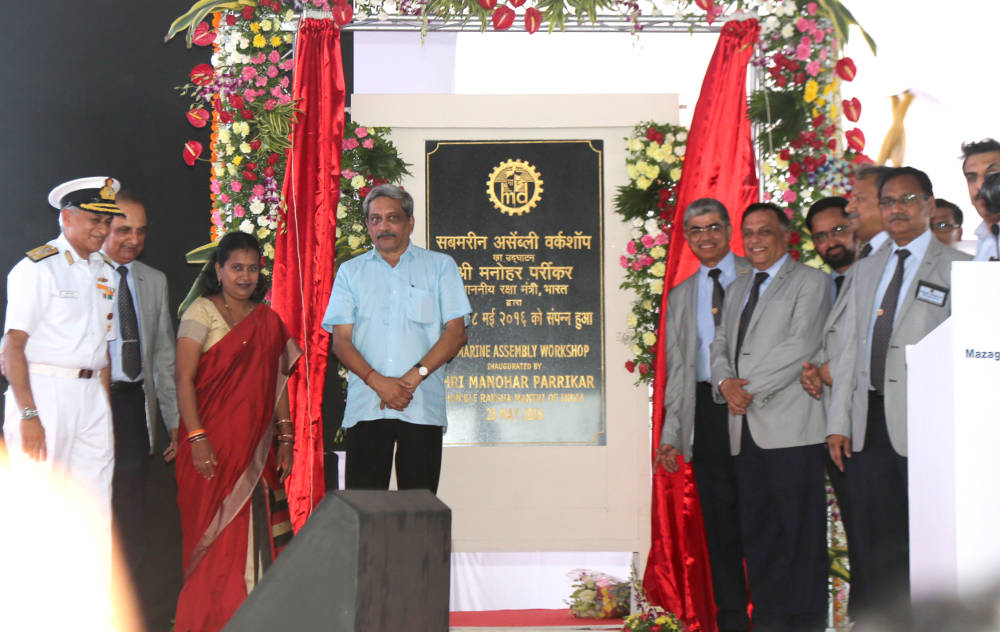
- Snehal Ambekar in May 2016 (third from left)

Mayor of Mumbai
- In office September 2014 – March 2017
- Preceded by: Sunil Prabhu
- Succeeded by: Vishwanath Mahadeshwar

Personal details
- Born: 31 July 1972 (age 54)
- Party: Shiv Sena

Snehal Ambekar (born 31 July 1972) is a Shiv Sena politician from Mumbai. She was the former Mayor of Mumbai. She is the first Dalit woman to have held the position. There has been a controversy regarding her use of a red beacon on top of her car as mayor.

== Positions held ==
- 2012: Elected as corporator in Brihanmumbai Municipal Corporation
- 2012: Member of Architecture Committee Brihanmumbai Municipal Corporation
- 2014: Elected as Mayor of Brihanmumbai Municipal Corporation
- 2017: Elected as corporator in Brihanmumbai Municipal Corporation.
