= Sunil Prabhu =

Indian politician

Member of Maharashtra Legislative Assembly
- Incumbent
- Assumed office 2014
- Preceded by: Rajhans Singh
- Constituency: Dindoshi

Mayor of Mumbai
- In office 9 March 2012 – 9 September 2014
- Preceded by: Shraddha Jadhav
- Succeeded by: Snehal Ambekar

Personal details
- Born: 11 July 1969 (age 57)
- Party: Shiv Sena (Uddhav Balasaheb Thackeray); Shiv Sena
- Children: 1 (Ankit Prabhu)

Sunil Wamanrao Prabhu is an Indian politician belonging to the Shiv Sena (UBT). He was a member of the 14th Maharashtra Legislative Assembly representing the Dindoshi Assembly Constituency. He was the 74th mayor of the city of Mumbai, the capital of the Indian state of Maharashtra, and chief of Brihanmumbai Municipal Corporation, the country's richest municipal body. He got a ticket for the 4th time from Dindoshi Assembly to contest against Sanjay Nirupam of Shiv sena in 2024 Vidhan Sabha elections.

== Early life and career ==
Prabhu started his career in 1992 as a personal assistant to a senior Shiv Sena leader and MP, Gajanan Kirtikar, until 1997. It was on Kirtikar's insistence that he had gotten a chance to fight the civic elections from Aarey Colony in 1997. Subsequently, he went on to win three civic elections. Prabhu has been voted as the best orator in the civic house on several occasions. He is known for his powerful speeches, especially on financial issues. He was the leader of the house in BMC for six years.

== Positions held ==
- 1992 : He was Personal assistant to a senior Shiv Sena leader and MP, Gajanan Kirtikar, until 1997.
- 1997: Elected as corporator in Brihanmumbai Municipal Corporation (1st term)
- 2002: Re-elected as corporator in Brihanmumbai Municipal Corporation (2nd term)
- 2007: Re-elected as corporator in Brihanmumbai Municipal Corporation (3rd term)
- 2012: Re-elected as corporator in Brihanmumbai Municipal Corporation (4th term)
- 2012-2014: Mayor of Brihanmumbai Municipal Corporation
- 2014: Elected to Maharashtra Legislative Assembly
- 2019: Re-elected to Maharashtra Legislative Assembly
- 2019-2022: Chief whip, Shivsena
- 2024: Re-elected to Maharashtra Legislative Assembly
- 2024: Chief Whip, Shiv Sena (UBT)

== See also ==
- Mayor of Mumbai
