= Vishwanath Mahadeshwar =

Indian politician (1960–2023)

- विश्वनाथ महाडेश्वर

Mayor of Mumbai
- In office 8 March 2017 – 2019
- Preceded by: Snehal Ambekar
- Succeeded by: Kishori Pednekar

Personal details
- Born: 15 April 1960
- Died: 8 May 2023 (aged 63)
- Party: Shiv Sena
- Spouse: Pooja Mahadeshwar

Vishwanath Mahadeshwar (15 April 1960 – 8 May 2023) was an Indian Shiv Sena politician from Mumbai, Maharashtra. He served as the mayor of Brihanmumbai Municipal Corporation. He had also served as chairman of the civic education committee and was a member of the standing committee.

Mahadeshwar died on 8 May 2023, at the age of 63.

== Positions held ==
- 2002: Elected as corporator in Brihanmumbai Municipal Corporation
- 2003: Elected as chairman of Education Committee in Brihanmumbai Municipal Corporation
- 2007: Re-elected as corporator in Brihanmumbai Municipal Corporation
- 2012: Re-elected as corporator in Brihanmumbai Municipal Corporation
- 2017: Elected as mayor of Brihanmumbai Municipal Corporation
