= Datta Dalvi =

Indian politician

Datta Dalvi, an Indian politician from the Shiv Sena political party was the Mayor of Mumbai from 2005 to 2007. Until then, he served as a corporator in the Mumbai municipal corporation for three successive terms.
