= 1997 Brihanmumbai Municipal Corporation election =

Local elections in Maharashtra

| 15 March 1997 | 2002 → |

All 227 seats in BMC 114 seats needed for a majority

| | First party | Second party | Third party |
|---|---|---|---|
| Party | SS | INC | BJP |
| Seats won | 103 | 48 | 26 |
| Seat change | ▲33 | ▼62 | ▲13 |
BMC majority after election
SHS

The 1997 BMC election was held on 15 March 1997.

== Election results ==
Shiv Sena, Indian National Congress and Bhartiya Janta Party were the major political parties in this election.

| Party | Seats |
|---|---|
| Shiv Sena | 103 |
| Indian National Congress | 48 |
| Bharatiya Janata Party | 26 |
